= State of Anarchy (record label) =

State of Anarchy is a Dutch record label founded in 2019 by Tha Playah[nl], focusing on hardcore music and its associated subgenres. It is a sublabel of 57 Music. With over 100 million worldwide streams as of 2025, it is among the most successful hardcore labels in The Netherlands.

State of Anarchy describes itself as an "ultimate platform for hardcore regardless of style or sound." Nonetheless, the label generally features fast-paced, punchy, industrial sounds mixed and balanced with "sharp" melodic elements, as well as samples from rap music and movies, reminiscent of Tha Playah's personal style. With State of Anarchy featuring many "legends" of the hardcore scene, State of Anarchy also features remakes, remixes and remasters of famous tracks from the past such as "Still Nr. 1," "You ain't Real" and "Rulebreaker."

== History ==
State of Anarchy was founded in 2019 by a well-known artist in the hardcore subcommunity; Tha Playah, who previously released tracks under the famous Rotterdam Records, the first ever hardcore label in the world. Additionally, he released tracks under Neophyte Records, a label by another well-known artist in the scene; Neophyte, for over 17 years. After 17 years at Neophyte Records, State of Anarchy was created so Tha Playah could have more creative liberty. The first CD-release of his first album at State of Anarchy, Sick and Twisted instantly sold out.

=== Hardcore Vigilance ===
State of Anarchy releases a bimonthly mix called Hardcore Vigilance through the online audio streaming service Spotify. The first ever Hardcore Vigilance mixtape was released on YouTube on 13 April 2022. The 30-minute track features many well-known artists such as Angerfist, Miss K8, and Tha Playah himself. Unlike the Spotify releases, these original mixtapes were not uploaded on a scheduled basis. Ten of these mixtapes were released between April 2022 and 15 November 2023, all averaging around 30 minutes.

=== Logo ===
State of Anarchy's logo features the "circle-A;" a symbol of political anarchism, reflecting the longstanding relationship between the hardcore music genre and left-wing movements. Hardcore as a music genre created a subculture in The Netherlands called gabber, sometimes erroneously associated with the far-right. However, most hardcore and gabber music and artists have historically used left-wing imagery, slogans and titles, and many gabbers reject the right-wing stereotype. Many of the oldest and most well-respected hardcore artists and labels have spoken out against prejudice as a reaction to right-wing infiltrators trying to co-opt the subculture's image, much like attempts made in the British skinhead and punk-scene.

== Artists ==
The artists currently signed to State of Anarchy are:

- Tha Playah
- Restrained
- Karun
- Indika

Artists who have previously released music through State of Anarchy are:

- MC Alee
- DJ Paul Elstak
- Nosferatu [nl]
- Neophyte
- Promo[nl]
- N-Vitral
- MC Nolz
- Ophidian
- Broken Minds
- Furyan
- Radical Redemption
- Rejecta
- Scarra
- The Viper
- Gridkiller
- Angerfist
- Maintain
