= Energiehal =

Former events hall in Rotterdam

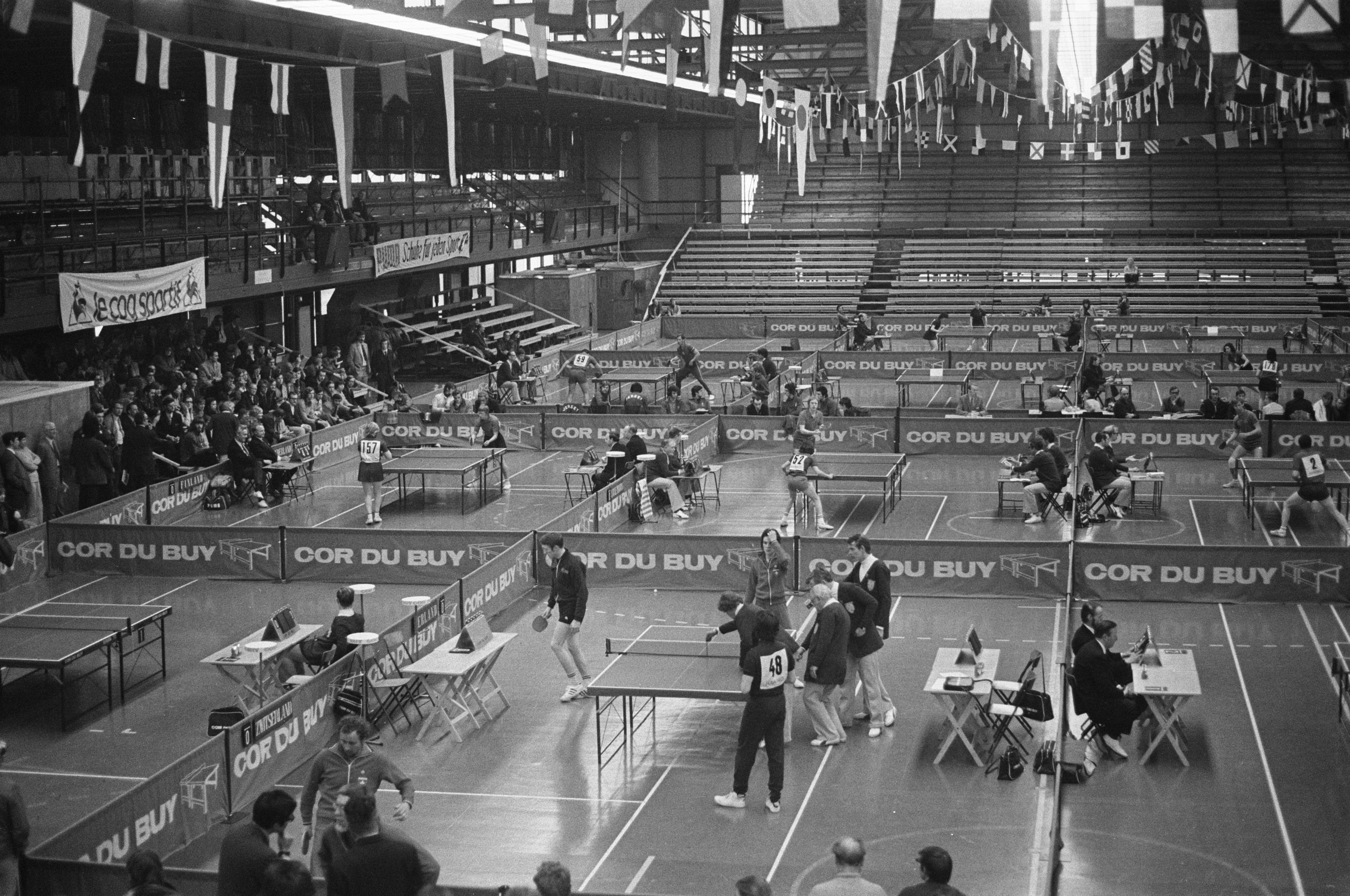
- European Table Tennis Championships in 1972
- Interactive map of the Energiehal area

General information
- Status: Demolished
- Type: Events hall
- Location: Energieweg 5, 3041 JC, Rotterdam, Netherlands
- Opened: 1955
- Relocated: 1950s
- Closed: 1999
- Owner: Rotterdam city council

Design and construction
- Known for: E55 exhibition, sport events, raves

The Energiehal was an events hall built in a park in west Rotterdam in 1955, for the E55 exhibition. It was then relocated to the Blijdorp district in north Rotterdam, being used for decades as a sports hall and for other events. In the 1990s, it became a rave venue and is famous in the history of gabber. It was demolished in 1999.

== History ==
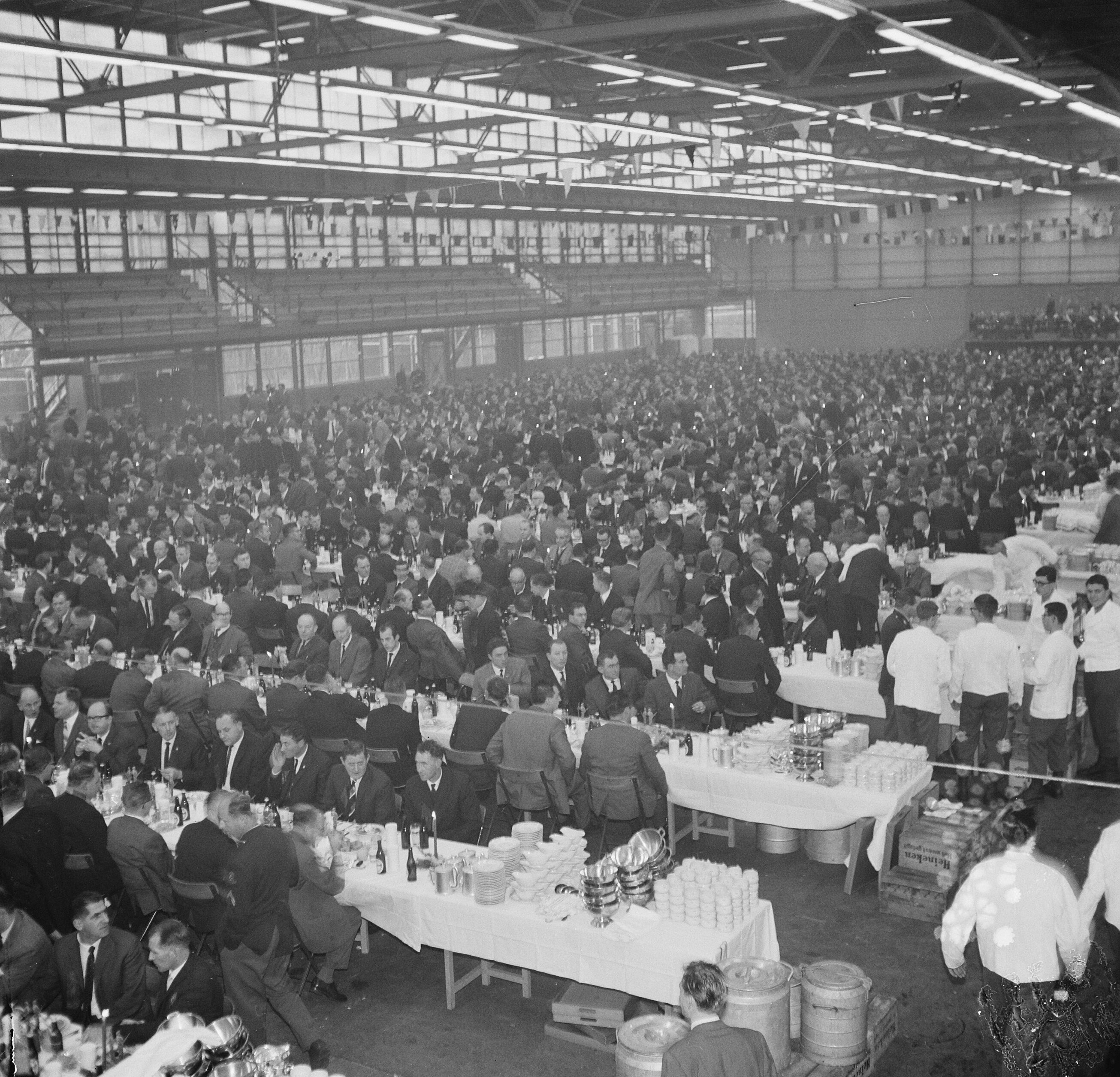
A meal for 3000 marines in 1965

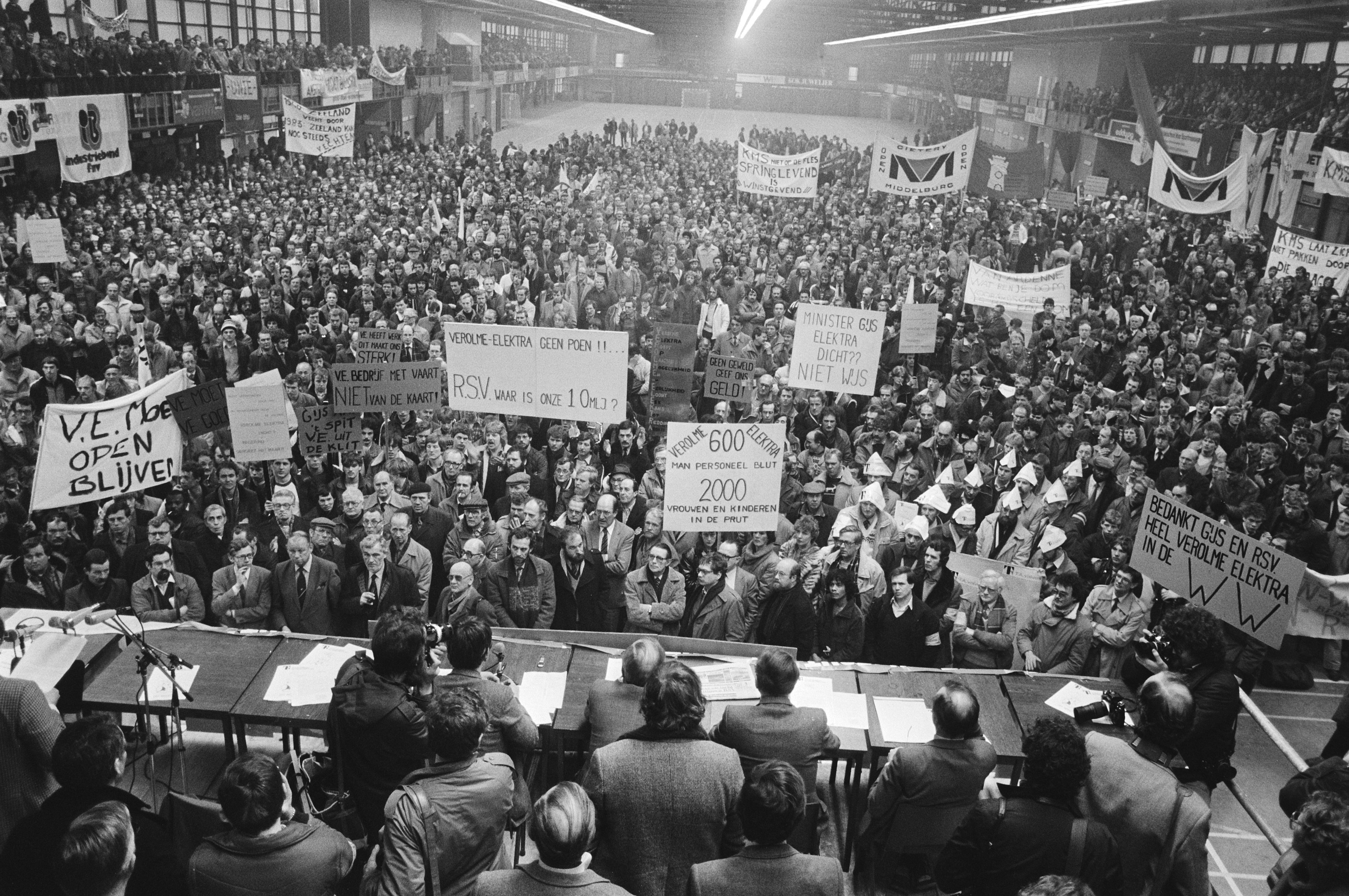
In 1983, the Rijn-Schelde-Verolme shipyard was in financial difficulties and workers held a meeting at the Energiehal*

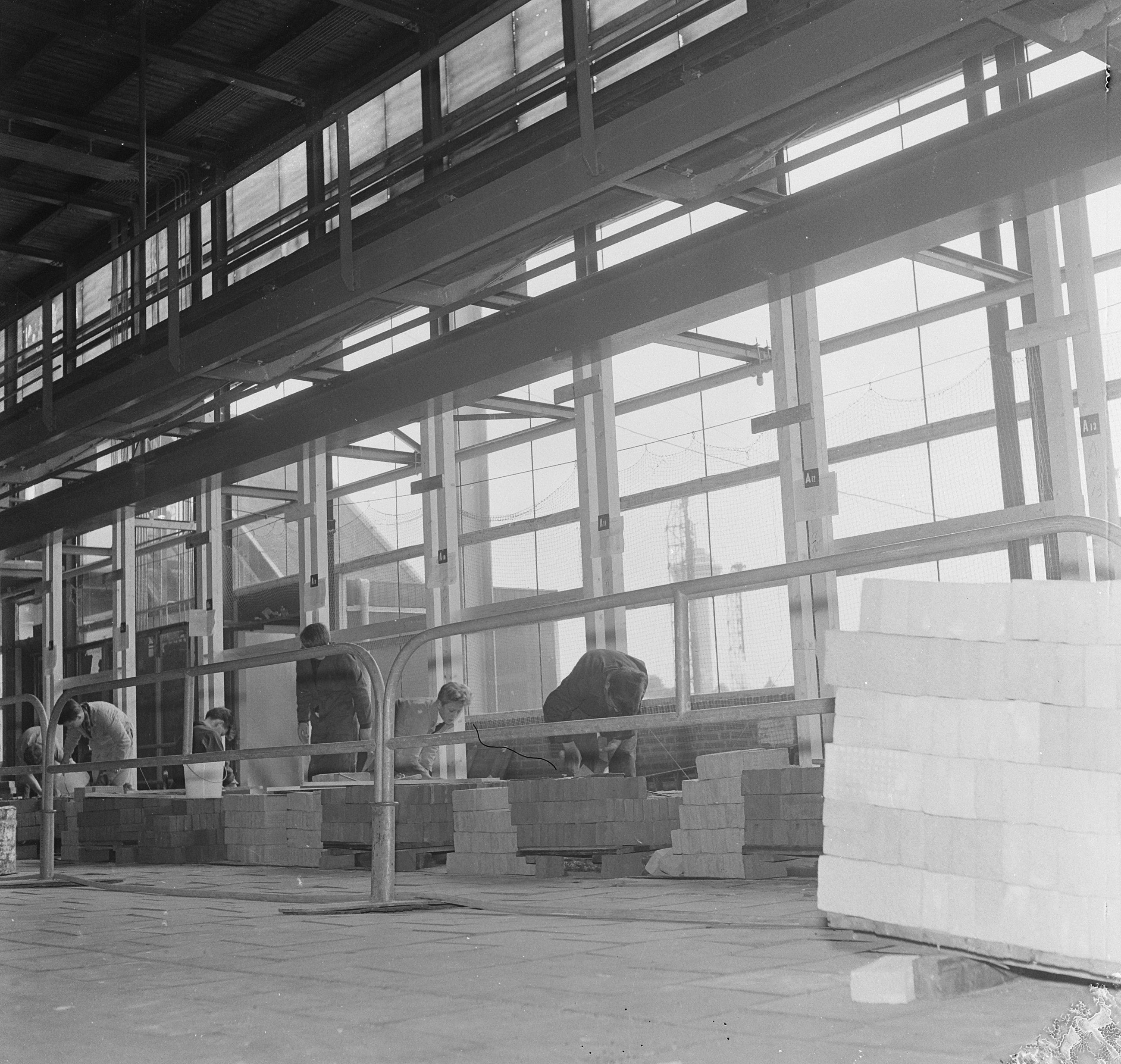
Masonry and plastering competition in the Energiehal, 1966

The Energiehal was a large events centre constructed in 1955 in Het Park, a park in west Rotterdam, for the E55 exhibition in Rotterdam. The E55 was opened by Queen Juliana on 18 May 1955 and had been devised as a "National Energy Event". It was hugely successful, attracting over three million visitors.

After the festival, the building was broken down and reconstructed in Blijdorp district in north Rotterdam, next to Blijdorp zoo. It was then used for several decades as a sport hall and for other events. During a series of events to celebrate the 300 year anniversary of the founding of the Korps Mariniers (Netherlands Marine Corps) in 1965, a parade of 3,000 marines marched to the Energiehal and then ate lunch. In 1972, it hosted the European Table Tennis Championships.

In 1988, a huge unexploded World War II bomb was discovered in Bellavoystraat, west Rotterdam and an entire district was evacuated. The plan was to house around 1000 people and their pets at the Energiehal, although in the end it was not necessary since the "Bellebom" was easily defused and moved. The frozen meals that the council had ordered to feed the families expected at the Energiehal were returned to the supplier.

== Gabber venue ==
By the early 1990s the hall had fallen into disuse and it was then repurposed as a dance venue. Gabber was a style of hardcore electronic music pioneered in Rotterdam by DJs such as Paul Elstak. Together with Rob Janssen, he began a club night called Nightmare and after the first edition at the Parkzicht, they moved the rave to the Energiehal, where it regularly attracted 15,000 people. A subculture developed which featured people with shaved heads wearing tracksuits dancing to music of between 160 and 200 beats per minute. The Energiehal was later described by Resident Advisor as "Rotterdam's real hardcore mecca".

After putting on raves in the Maasvlaakte, the Megarave organisation began to use the Energiehal for big parties. They would always have livesets such as Neophyte and Rotterdam Terror Corps, alongside DJs such as Lenny Dee, Paul Elstak, Drokz and Buzz Fuzz. George Ruseler of Rotterdam Terror Corps describes the Energiehal as "gabbertempel van Europa" ("the gabber temple of Europe").

The Energiehal was also used for concerts. In October 1998, it hosted 7,000 people who came to see Cheb Khaled. The organisers failed to guard the cloakroom and many coats were stolen, causing a riot at the end of the gig in which at least five people were wounded.

The Energiehal was demolished in October 1999. Before its destruction, the zoo had been considering building an attraction with animatronic dinosaurs in the building.

== Bibliography ==
- Barendrecht, Luuk (15 September 2019). "Toen in Rotterdam: de Energiehal, de meest toepasselijke naam ooit". In de Buurt.
- Dicker, Holly (19 February 2018). "Thunderdome: 25 years of hardcore". Resident Advisor.
- Grip, Sander (2015). "Het geluid van Rotterdam". Gers!.
- Staff writer (6 October 1998). "Energiehal voorzag al moeilijkheden rond concert". Trouw (in Dutch).
- Staff writer (27 March 2018). "30 jaar later: Een complete woonwijk ontruimen voor de Bellebom". RTV Rijnmond (in Dutch).
- Tap, Marcia (18 May 2020). "Vier dagen na het bombardement start de wederopbouw van Rotterdam". Rijnmond (in Dutch).
- van Zelst, Nina (26 July 2019). "Megarave organisation about the past: "We will never forget our roots"". Hardcore News.
- Wijnstekers, Marcel (18 March 2017). "Paul Elstak, hardcore huisman". AD.
