= Mysteryland =

Annual music festival in the Netherlands

- Genre: Techno; House; Trance; Dance; Hardstyle; Urban; Hip hop Electro; Big Room House; Dancehall; Hardcore
- Dates: 27–29 August 2021 (Camping: 27 August – 1 September 2021)
- Locations: Netherlands: Floriade, Chile: Picarquín
- Years active: 1993–present
- Website: mysteryland.nl

Mysteryland is the leading electronic dance music festival in the Netherlands, organized by the Netherlands-based promoter ID&T. Being the first of its kind in the country when it was established, its organizers have billed the event as the oldest dance music festival in the Netherlands. It has most recently been held at Haarlemmermeerse Bos in Haarlemmermeer; an exhibition ground that hosted the 2002 edition of the Dutch gardening festival Floriade. It is traditionally held on the final weekend of August; the next date is August 25-27, 2023. Since 2015, the festival has changed from a one-day to a three-day event with camping. Each year, more than 100.000 visitors from over 100 nationalities are welcomed at Mysteryland.

In 2011, an international edition of Mysteryland was held in Chile, the first to be held outside the Netherlands.

Mysteryland USA, the American version of Mysteryland, was first held on Memorial Day weekend, May 2014, at the Bethel Woods Center for the Arts, the site of the notable Woodstock festival held in 1969. Headliners included Kaskade, Moby, Steve Aoki, Dillon Francis, and Flosstradamus. Mysteryland USA 2017 was canceled.

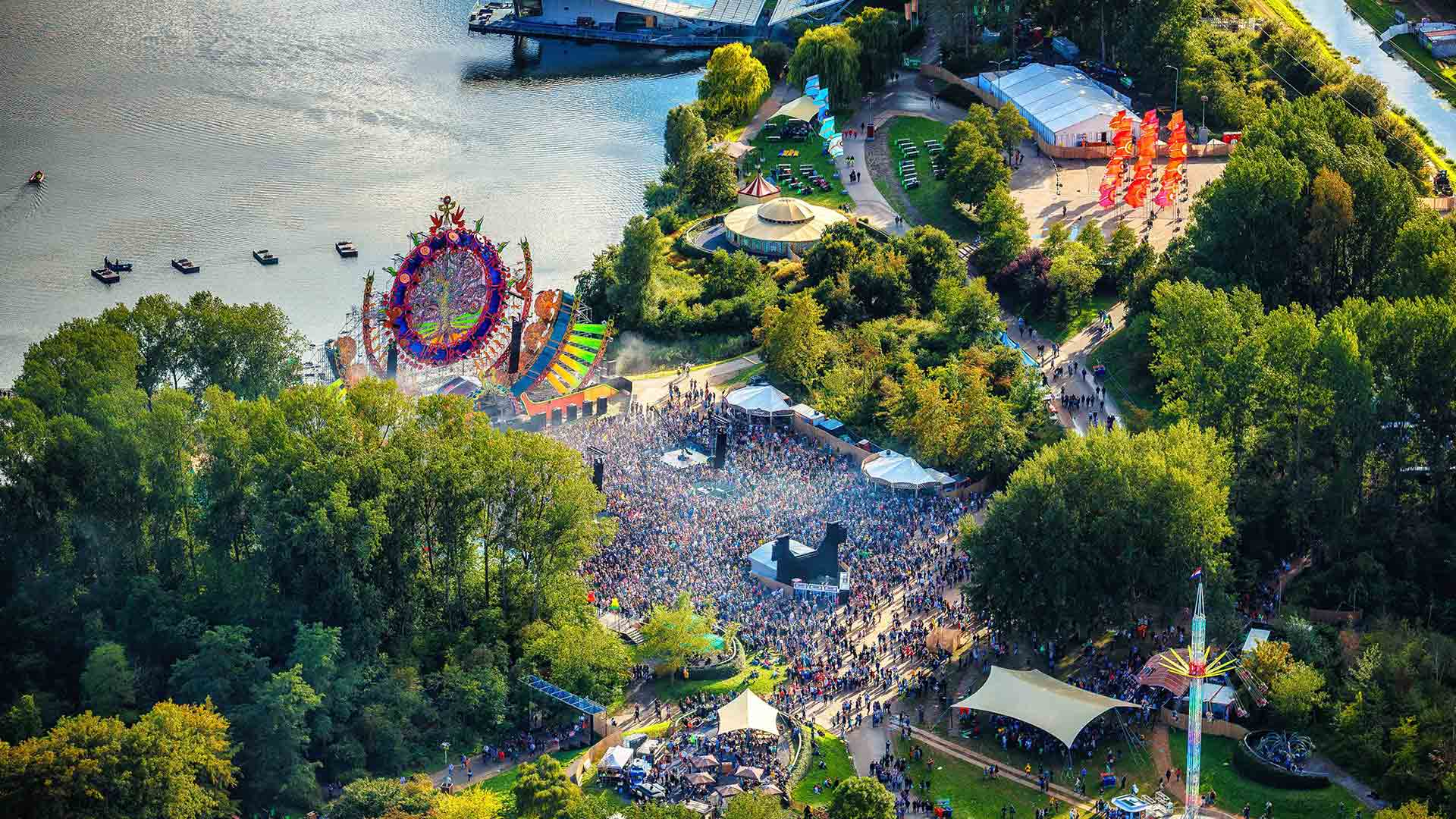
The Main stage of Mysteryland 2018

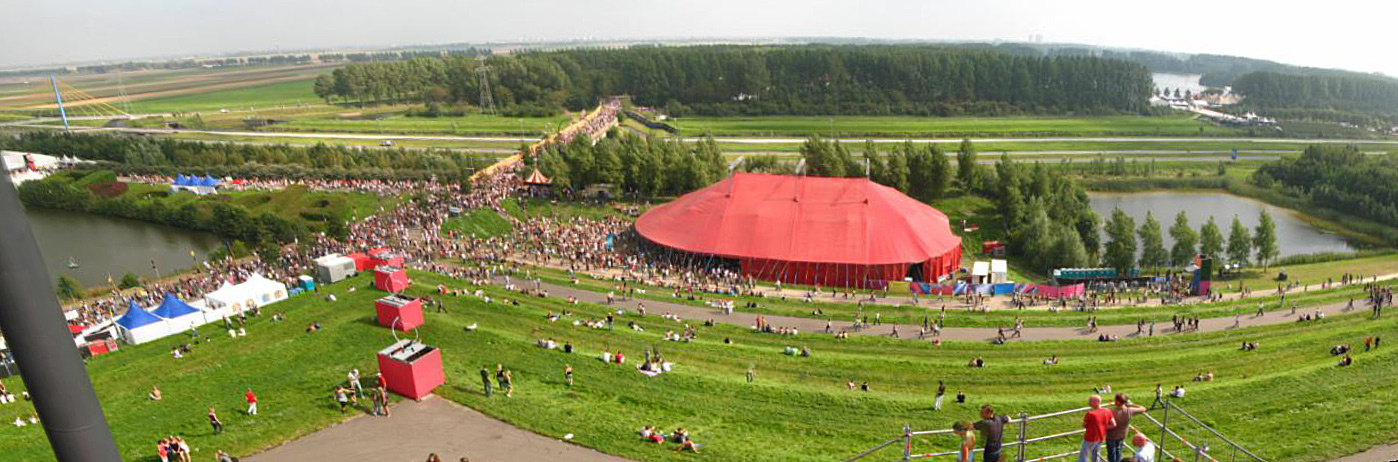
View from the large pyramid on the venue area on the 2007 event.

== Previous editions ==
Year	Location	Date	Headliners
1993	Midland Circuit, Lelystad	July 9–11	Buzz Fuzz, Dano, Gizmo, the Prophet
1994	Maasvlakte, Rotterdam	June 24–26	Paul Elstak, Buzz Fuzz, Dano, Neophyte, The Prophet, Bass-D, Mental Theo, Charly Lownoise, Dione, Michel de Hey, Steff da Campo, Angelo, Marcello
1995	Cancelled		
1996	Eindhoven Airport, Eindhoven	June 22	4 Tune Fairytales, Mindtrust, 3 Steps Ahead, Party Animals, 2 Brothers on the 4th Floor, Bass-D & King Matthew, Buzz Fuzz, Dano, Dana, Gizmo, Darkraver, Angelo, Isis, Dmitri, Joost van Bellen
1997	Jaarbeurs Utrecht	February 22	Dj Jean, Buzz Fuzz, Dione, Weirdo, Rob & MC Joe, Yves, Darkraver, Delirium
1997	Jaarbeurs Utrecht	March 7	The Viper, Dana, Buzz Fuzz, Waxweazle, Pavo, Weirdo
1997	Recreatieterrein Bussloo	July 4	Bass-D & King Matthew, Dano, Gizmo, Rotterdam Terror Corps, Rob & MC Joe, Waxxweazle, Dana, the Prophet
1998	Jaarbeurs Utrecht	April 11	Darkraver, Dana, Promo, the Prophet, the Viper, Michel de Hey, Steve Rachmad, Remy, Yves
1998	Recreatieterrein Lingebos	July 4	Neophyte, Boris Valeo, Akira, Dana, the Prophet, Pavo, Promo, Gizmo, Darkraver
1999	Recreatieterrein Bussloo	July 3	Dana, Leviathan, Tiësto, 3 Steps Ahead
2000	Recreatieterrein Bussloo	August 26	Marcello, Monika Kruse, Joost van Bellen, Laidback Luke, Isis, Noize Suppressor, Claudio Lacinhouse, Quazar
2001	Six Flags Holland	June 16	Junkie XL, Armin van Buuren, Benny Rodrigues, Cosmic Gate, Johan Gielen, DJ Jean, Neophyte, Olav Basoski, Scot Project, Remy, Roog, Yves de Ruyter, Marco V, DJ Luna
2002	Ruigoord, Amsterdam	August 17	Felix da Housecat, Johan Gielen, Mauro Picotto, Marco V, Roog, Mousse T, Tiefschwarz, Tom Novy, Sven Väth, Anne Savage, Eddie Halliwell, Judge Jules, Armin van Buuren, Cosmic Gate, Ferry Corsten, Marcel Woods, Rank 1, Dumonde, Yves de Ruyter, Kai Tracid, Marnix
2003	Floriade, Haarlemmermeer	August 23	Paul van Dyk, Laidback Luke, Sander Kleinenberg, Michel de Hey, Sven Väth, Timo Maas, Tomcraft, Erick Morillo, Richie Hawtin, Roog, Erick E
2004	Floriade, Haarlemmermeer	August 21	Benny Benassi, Junior Jack, Audio Bullys, Richie Hawtin, Darren Emerson, Paul van Dyk, Tiësto, Tommy Lee, Mylo, Tim Deluxe, Junkie XL, Cor Fijneman, Rank 1, Dadara
2005	Floriade, Haarlemmermeer	August 27	Paul Oakenfold, Armand van Helden, Erick Morillo, Benjamin Bates, Steve Angello, Johan Gielen, Marco V, Judge Jules, Cor Fijneman, Mark Norman, Felix da Housecat, Sander Kleinenberg, Benny Rodrigues, Roog, David Guetta
2006	Floriade, Haarlemmermeer	August 26	Roger Sanchez, Felix da Housecat, Sven Väth, Erick E, Fedde le Grand, Dave Clarke, David Guetta, Junkie XL, Roog, Richie Hawtin, Benny Rodrigues, Sander van Doorn, Nic Chagall, Eddie Halliwell, Mark Norman, Marcel Woods, Markus Schulz
2007	Floriade, Haarlemmermeer	August 25	Derrick May, Chris Liebing, Marco V, Dr. Lektroluv, Felix da Housecat, Fedde le Grand, Mason & the Maker, Sander van Doorn, Menno de Jong, Markus Schulz, Armin van Buuren, Steve Angello, Roger Sanchez, Marnix
2008	Floriade, Haarlemmermeer	August 23	Dj Rush, Green Velvet, David Guetta, Dr. Lektroluv, Erick E, Isis, Marco V, Laidback Luke, Tocadisco, Tiësto, Nic Chagall, Chris Liebing, British murder boys, Roger Sanchez, Valentino Kanzyani
2009	Floriade, Haarlemmermeer	August 29	Joost van Bellen, Isis, Michel de Hey, Chuckie, Swedish House Mafia (Sebastian Ingrosso, Steve Angelo & Axwell), Felix da Housecat, LELE, Vive la Fete, Sander van Doorn, Fedde le Grand, Adam Beyer, Noisecontrollers
2010	Floriade, Haarlemmermeer, Netherlands	August 28	Avicii, Tiësto, Dimitri Vegas & Like Mike, 2 Many DJs, Artificial Happiness, Axwell, Dirty South, HouseQuake, DJ Isis, Steve Aoki, Fedde le Grand
2011	Floriade, Haarlemmermeer, Netherlands	August 27	2000 and One, A-Trak, Afrojack, Derrick May, Fedde le Grand, Joris Voorn, Sebastian Ingrosso, Ben Sims, Boris Werner, Todd Terry, Dave Clarke, Dimitri Vegas & Like Mike Headhunterz, Brennan Heart
2011	Picarquín, Mostazal, Chile	December 16–18	2000 and One, Sidney Samson, Mark Knight, Eddie Halliwell, Marco V, Tocadisco, Dimitri Vegas & Like Mike, Headhunterz, Wildstylez, Brennan Heart, Juan & Daniel Sanchez, Tiefschwarz, Dennis Ferrer
2012	Floriade, Haarlemmermeer, Netherlands	August 25	Sandro Silva, Tommy Trash, Hardwell, Martin Solveig, Avicii, Calvin Harris, Yellow Claw, Dimitri Vegas & Like Mike, Fedde le Grand, Zedd, Tiga, Wildstylez, Zatox
2012	Picarquín, Mostazal, Chile	December 14–16	Chuckie, Headhunterz, Wildstylez, Sander Van Doorn, Otto Knows, Sunnery James & Ryan Marciano, Luciano
2013	Floriade, Haarlemmermeer, Netherlands	August 24	Bakermat, Fake Blood, Fedde le Grand, Steve Angello, Steve Aoki, Chuckie, Martin Garrix, Wildstylez, Brennan Heart, Wildstylez, Showtek and many others
2013	Picarquín, Mostazal, Chile	December 20–22	Fedde Le Grand, Chuckie, Mark Knight, Cajmere, Thomas Gold, Deniz Koyu, Riva Starr, Electrodomésticos, Shermanology, Frontliner
2014	Floriade, Haarlemmermeer, Netherlands	August 23	Luuk van Dijk, UMEK, Steve Aoki, NERVO, Yellow Claw, The Opposites, Hardwell, Chris Liebing, Pendulum, Sigma, R3hab, Toneshifterz, Frontliner, Coone, Noisecontrollers
2014	Picarquín, Mostazal, Chile	December 19–21	Sander Van Doorn, Laidback Luke, Blasterjaxx, Sick Individuals, Carnage, Wildstylez, Max Enforcer, MOTi, Rusko, Sandro Silva, Mightyfools, Chris Liebing, Chris Liebing, Skream B2B, Eats Everything, Blond:ish
2015	Floriade, Haarlemmermeer, Netherlands	August 29–30	Alesso, Coone, Dillon Francis, Dubfire, DVBBS, Firebeatz, Hercules & Love Affair, Knife Party, Laidback Luke, Martin Garrix, Nero, Nicky Romero, Porter Robinson, Steve Angello, Ummet Ozcan, Wildstylez, and many others
2016	Floriade, Haarlemmermeer, Netherlands	August 27–28	Afrojack, Boys Noize, De Jeugd van Tegenwoordig, Diplo, Don Diablo, Galantis, Gorgon City, KSHMR, Lost Frequencies, Robin Schulz, Sam Feldt, Martin Garrix, and many others
2017	Floriade, Haarlemmermeer, Netherlands	August 26–27	Above & Beyond, Alesso, Alok, Armin van Buuren, Axwell ? Ingrosso, Carl Cox, Chocolate Puma, Coone, Craig David, Dave Clarke, Deadmau5, DVBBS, Kris Kross Amsterdam, Oliver Heldens, Sam Feldt, and many others
2018	Floriade, Haarlemmermeer, Netherlands	August 24–26	Alesso, Dimitri Vegas & Like Mike, Fatboy Slim, Hardwell, Headhunterz, Loco Dice, Paul van Dyk, Ronnie Flex & Deuxperience, Sunnery James & Ryan Marciano, Sven Väth, Wildstylez, and many others
2019	Floriade, Haarlemmermeer, Netherlands	August 23–25	Martin Garrix, Tchami & Malaa, Nicky Romero, Diplo, Showtek, Sigala, Warface, Dimitri Vegas & Like Mike, KSHMR, Adaro, Firebeatz, and many others
2020 - Cancelled due to CoViD-19	Floriade, Haarlemmermeer, Netherlands	August 28–30	Armin van Buuren, DJ Snake, Timmy Trumpet, Vini Vici, Carl Cox, Wildstylez, NGHTMRE, Sunnery James & Ryan Marciano, Sven Väth, Sefa, Aly & Fila, and 300 more
2021 - Cancelled due to CoViD-19	Floriade, Haarlemmermeer, Netherlands	August 27–29	???
2022 -	Floriade, Haarlemmermeer, Netherlands	August 26–28	Armin van Buuren, DJ Snake, Alan Walker, Carl Cox, Oliver Heldens, Sven Väth, Kris Kross Amsterdam, Sunnery James & Ryan Marciano, ACRAZE, and 300 more

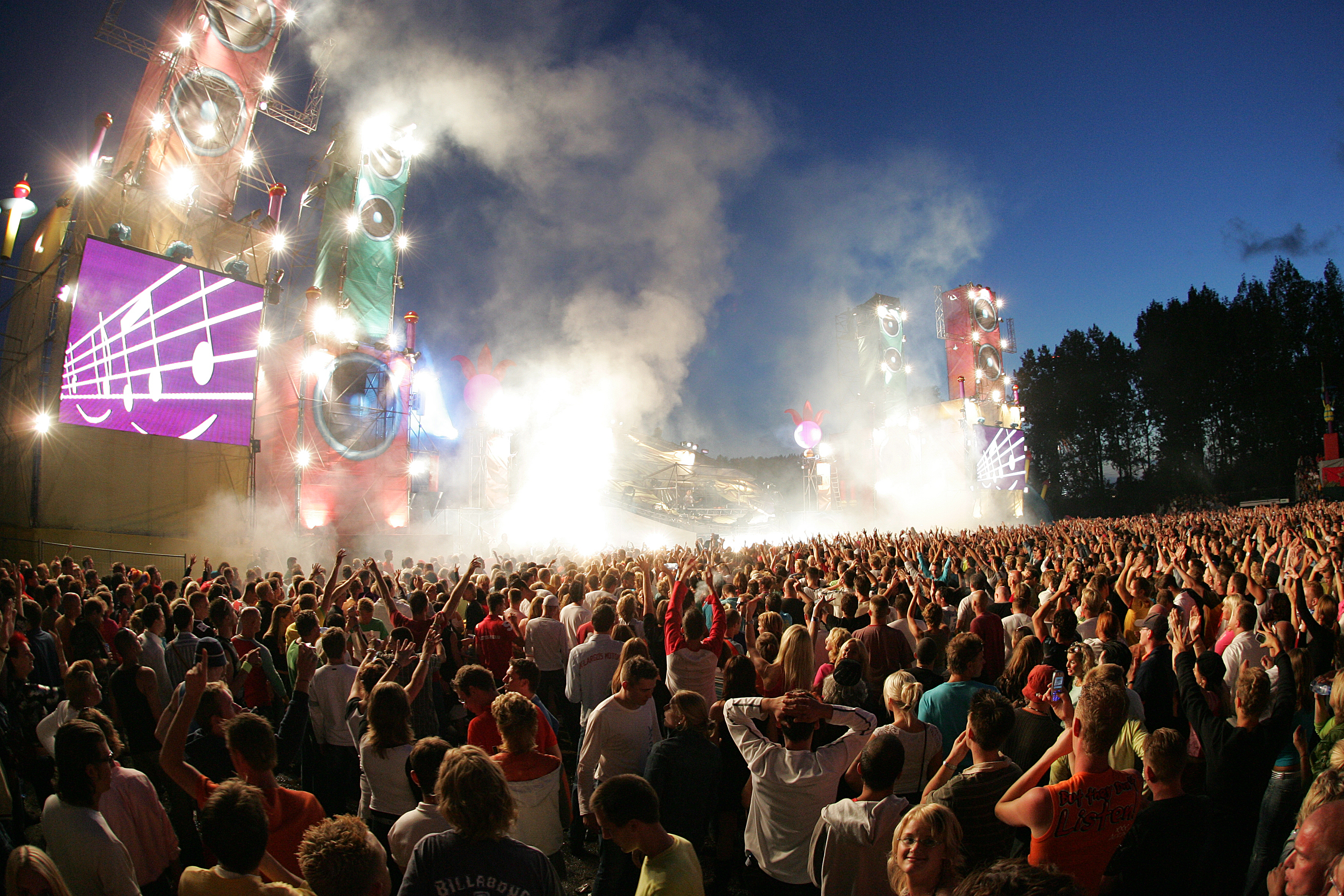

== See also ==
- List of electronic music festivals
