= Rotterdam Records =

Dutch music label

- Founded: 1992
- Founder: Paul Elstak
- Defunct: 2012
- Genre: Hardcore Techno, Gabber
- Country of origin: Netherlands
- Location: Rotterdam, Netherlands
- Official website: http://www.rotterdamrecords.com/ (Archived March 28, 2014)

Rotterdam Records was a Dutch record label founded by DJ Paul Elstak in 1992. It released hardcore and gabber music. It stopped in 2012 and restarted again in 2018 with MP3 releases.

== History ==
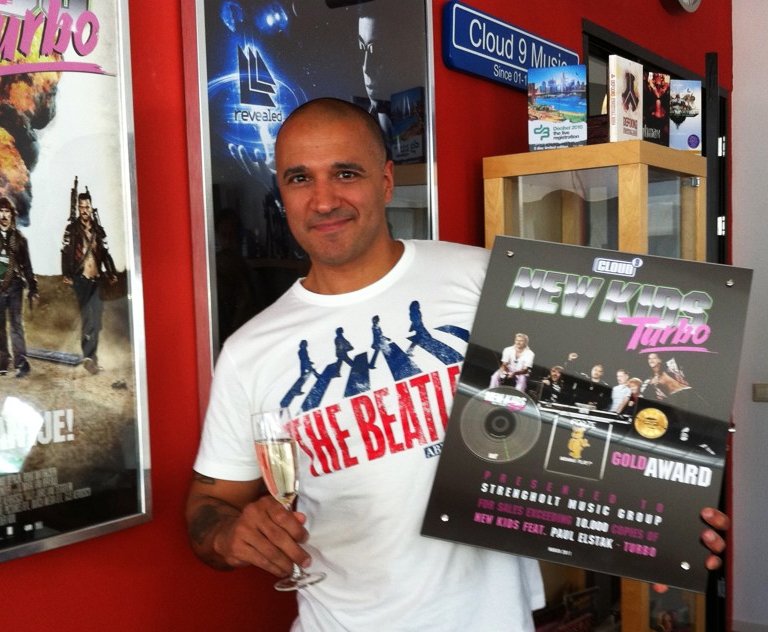
Original label owner Elstak in 2011

The label was set up by Paul Elstak who around 2000 quit to start his own label Offensive Records at Rige Entertainment. DJ Neophyte and DJ Panic took control of the label and three other labels (Forze Records, Neophyte Records and Terror Traxx). The label stopped in 2012 when Mid-Town Records went bankrupt.

Alongside Mokum Records in Amsterdam and Lenny Dee's New York based Industrial Strength Records, Rotterdam Records was an influential label in the early 1990s gabber scene.

== Releases ==
Founded in 1992, the label brought out over one hundred vinyl hardcore and gabber releases as well as CDs, DVDs and other merchandise. Sublabels included Forze Records, Rotterdam Records Classics, Rotterdam Records Special, Rotterdam Tekno and Terror Traxx.

An early release was "Poing" by Rotterdam Termination Source (Maurice Steenbergen and Danny Scholte) which went to number 2 in the Dutch Top 40 and became world famous.

It also released tracks by the Euromasters such as "Amsterdam waar lech dat dan?" (Amsterdam? Where's that?) which stoked rivalry with Amsterdam. As Elstak moved towards releasing happy hardcore and softer music in the mid to late 1990s (for example "Rainbow in the Sky"), the original fans voiced their anger. Nasenbluten released the diss track "Rotterdam Takes It Up The Ass".
