= DJ AniMe =

Italian DJ and music producer

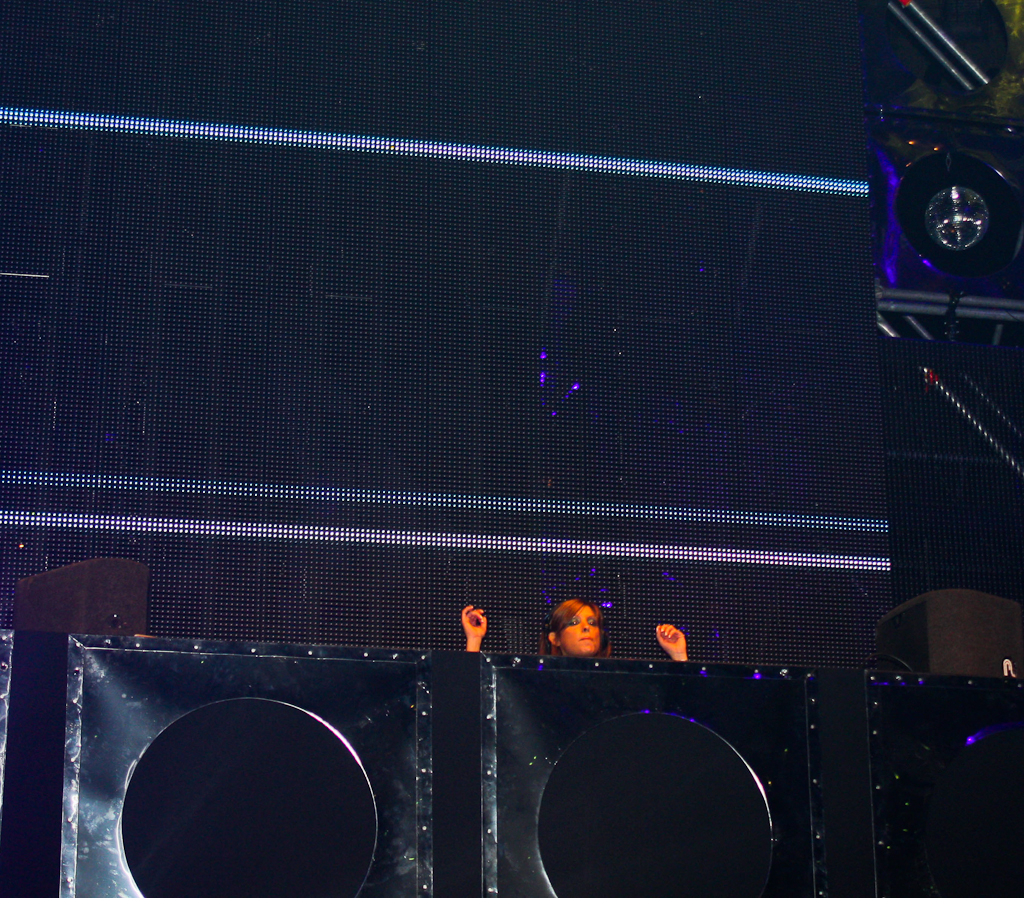
- AniMe performing at the Syndicate Festival, Germany, 2010

Background information
- Also known as: AniMe, Eklipze, Radioactive, Hypnotik
- Born: Piacenza, Italy
- Genres: Hardstyle, Gabber, Hard Techno
- Occupations: DJ, producer
- Labels: Absolute Records, Dogfight Records, Traxtorm Records, D-Boy Black Label
- Website: www.djanime.com

DJ AniMe, or simply AniMe, is an Italian DJ and producer specializing in the electronic music genre Hardcore. Dubbed The Queen Of Italian Hardcore by Insomniac, DJ AniMe has performed globally in a variety of countries and been a featured performer at large scale electronic music festivals such as Tomorrowland, Electric Daisy Carnival, Dominator, Mysteryland, Masters of Hardcore, Defqon.1 and Syndicate. In June 2023, she was ranked the #5 female DJ in Italy, the #33 female DJ in Europe and the #60 top ranked DJ in the world.

DJ AniMe has released four albums: Exterminate, Insane, Aftermath, and The 4th Dimension. Her singles include "Playing Terror", "A-Bomb", "In The End", "Fine Night", "So Cold", "Die For You", and "Detonate". In 2018 she produced "The Third Invasion", the festival anthem for Masters of Hardcore Austria. Her collaborative releases include "Absolute Power", "Come Get Some", "Hardcore Machine", and "Go Insane". In 2025 she launched her own label, Absolute Records.

== Early life ==
As a teenager, AniMe was drawn to a wide range of electronic music early on, including Progressive, Techno, Trance and Hardcore. At seventeen she decided to learn to deejay and began performing as DJ Eklipze, forming the duo Radioactive with a longtime friend. Together they were resident DJs at a small club outside of Milan and after a couple of years were offered a slot at the ECU Club in Rimini. They caught the attention of Grammy Award-nominated producer Luca Pretolesi who proposed that they join the D-Boy Black Label which, at the time, was one of the more important Italian hardcore labels. During those early years, AniMe (as DJ Eklipze) was the only female DJ/producer active in Italy. AniMe was signed to "Traxtorm Records" in 2010 and joined the prestigious DJ agency "Most Wanted DJ" in 2016. Currently, AniMe holds the record for the largest discography among female producers in Hardcore, Hard Dance, and Hardstyle music.

== Discography ==
- 2010 "Detonate"
- 2011 "A-Bomb"
- 2012 "Hardcore Machine" w/Mad Dog
- 2016 "Exterminate" Album
- 2017 "Call My Name"
- 2017 "Insane Hardcore"
- 2017 "Superior Hardcore" feat. Nolz (Anthem)
- 2018 "Insane" Album
- 2018 "The Third Invasion" feat. Dave Revan (Masters of Hardcore Anthem)
- 2019 "Hardshock" (Hardshock Festival Anthem)
- 2019 "Absolute Power" w/Broken Minds
- 2019 "Come Get Some" w/Mad Dog
- 2019 "Aftermath" Album
- 2020 "No Matter"
- 2022 "Blow Up"
- 2022 "Legacy" w/Miss K8
- 2023 "Voyage of The Damned" feat. Nolz (Dominator Festival Anthem)
- 2023 "The 4Th Dimension" Album
- 2023 "Go Insane" w/Broken Minds

== Awards ==
- 2023 #5 ranking Italy's Top Women DJs
- 2023 #33 ranking Europe's Top Women DJs
- 2023 #60 Top Women DJs In The World
