= Real Hardcore =

1998 single by Neophyte

Single by Neophyte

from the album Thunderdome - The Best Of '98 Hardcore
- B-side: "Recession"
- Released: 1998 (Europe)
- Genre: Gabber
- Length: 5:30
- Songwriter(s): Danny Greten; G. Kouwenhoven; Jeroen Streunding; Robin van Roon
- Producer(s): Jarno Butter

Neophyte singles chronology
"None Of Ya Left" (1997)	"Real Hardcore" (1998)	"Totally Remixed" (1998)

"Real Hardcore" is a single by Neophyte which was released in the year 1998.

== History ==
The song was the third single released from the "Hardcore" Album. The female vocals of the song are taken from the Johnny Violent's song "2 Kicks For Yes" from the album Shocker and the samples from "Braincracking" are used from Tracy Bonham's song "Brain Crack" from the album The Burdens of Being Upright.

=== Track list ===
No.	Title	Length
1.	"Real Hardcore"	5:30
2.	"Recession" (DJ Paul's Remix)	4:03
3.	"Punk Motherfucker"	3:43
4.	"Braincracking"	5:18

== Rocco Version ==
"Everybody"

Single by Rocco

from the album Dancecore
- Released: 2001 (Europe)
- Genre: Dance music
- Length: 3:24 (radio edit); 3:20 (album version)
- Songwriter(s): Slobodan Petrovic Jr. Sven Gruhnwald; Sebastian Göckede
- Producer(s): Slobodan Petrovic Jr. SveN-R-G; SeBass-Tian

Rocco singles chronology
"Back In Town Again" (2000)	"Everybody" (2001)	"Drop The Bass" (2003)

Real Hardcore was covered by German Dance music group Rocco as Everybody, it was released as the second single from their 2003 album "Dancecore".

=== History ===
It was the second sampled song from the album "Dancecore", after "Back In Town Again". The single was an international breakthrough for the band because it reached the Top Ten in all relevant dance charts. The single sold over 130,000 units and was number 9 on the German singles charts. The song was also published in Austria, Switzerland, Benelux, France, Spain, Italy, Hungary, Poland, Scandinavia, Japan, Taiwan, the United States and Canada. In July 2009 the band released a reworked version of his song under the name "Everybody 9.0"

=== Track listing ===
No.	Title	Length
1.	"Everybody" (Radio Edit)	3:24
2.	"Everybody" (Riphouse Edit)	3:59
3.	"Everybody" (Klubbingman Remix Edit)	3:58
4.	"Everybody" (Club Mix)	6:35
5.	"Everybody" (Ole Van Dansk)	5:40
6.	"Everybody" (Klubbingman Remix)	6:53
7.	"Everybody" (Junkwood Junkies Remix)	6:37

=== Charts ===
Chart (2002)	Peak position
Austrian Singles Chart	19
German Singles Chart	9
Swiss Singles Chart	53
