= Poing =

Poing may refer to:

- "Poing", a 1992 song by Rotterdam Termination Source
- Poing, Bavaria, a municipality of Ebersberg, Bavaria, Germany
