= Simon Skjodt Assembly Hall =

Basketball arena at Indiana University Bloomington

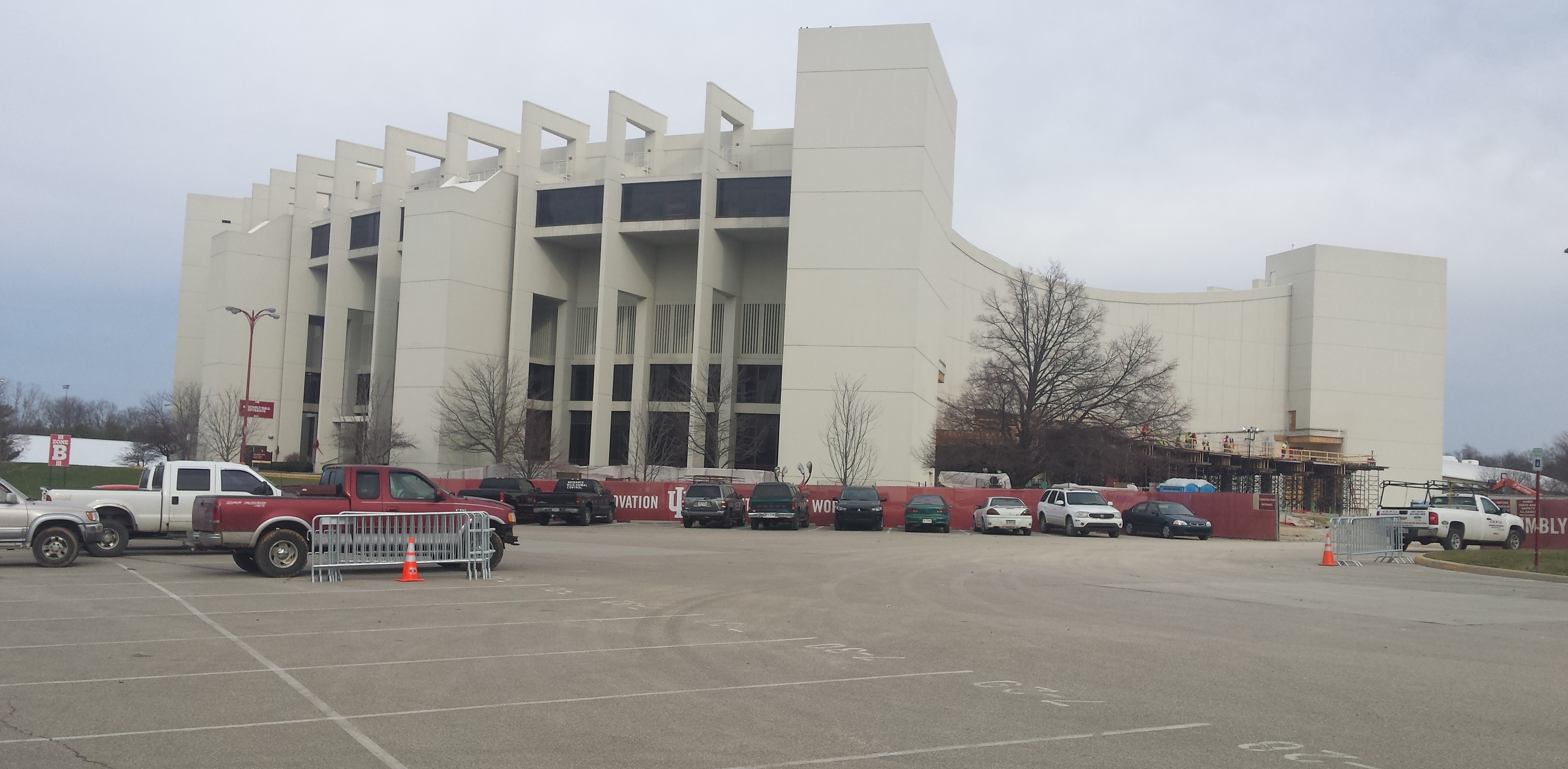
- Assembly Hall in December 2015
- Interactive map of Simon Skjodt Assembly Hall
- Former names: Assembly Hall (1971–2016)
- Location: 1001 East 17th Street; Bloomington, Indiana 47408-1590
- Coordinates: 39°10′51″N 86°31′20″W
- Owner: IU
- Capacity: 17,222 (2016–present); 17,472 (2011–2016); 17,456 (2005–2011); 17,257 (2000–2005); 17,357 (1976–2000); 16,746 (1973–1976); 16,666 (1971–1973)
- Surface: Hardwood

Construction
- Groundbreaking: December 22, 1967
- Opened: September 12, 1971
- Cost: $26.6 million ($211 million in 2025 dollars)
- Architect: Eggers & Higgins
- Structural engineer: Severud Associates
- General contractors: F.A. Wilhelm Construction Co., Inc.

Tenant
- Indiana Hoosiers (NCAA) (1971–present)

Simon Skjodt Assembly Hall (/skɒt/ SCOTT), is a 17,222-seat arena on the campus of Indiana University in Bloomington, Indiana, United States. It is the home of the Indiana Hoosiers men's basketball and women's basketball teams. It opened in 1971, replacing the "New" IU Fieldhouse. The court is named after Branch McCracken, the men's basketball coach who led the school to its first two NCAA National Championships in 1940 and 1953.

== History ==
=== Construction ===
After $26.6 million and several years of planning and construction, Assembly Hall opened in 1971.

The opening of the arena coincided with the debut of coach Bob Knight, who guided the Hoosiers for 29 seasons before his dismissal by then-IU president Myles Brand in September 2000.

Assembly Hall has been criticized by some fans for its unique design. Because the facility was designed without consideration for the video replay board added in 2005 that currently hangs above center-court, some of the top rows of the lower level are obstructed from the replay board by the overhanging balcony. The entire court itself, however, is still viewable. In December 2013, 24 monitors were added to the areas that had previously been obstructed. Work was completed by Strauser Construction and Cassady Electric.

In the fall of 2018, J.C. Ripberger Construction Corp completed the new Roberts Family Team Center which includes, the new Andy Mohr Locker Room, the Oladipo Zeller Legacy Lounge, the Tim Garl Athletic Training Room and the Basketball Coaches annex. Project was completed just prior to 2018 Hoosier Hysteria.

=== Upgrades and improvements ===
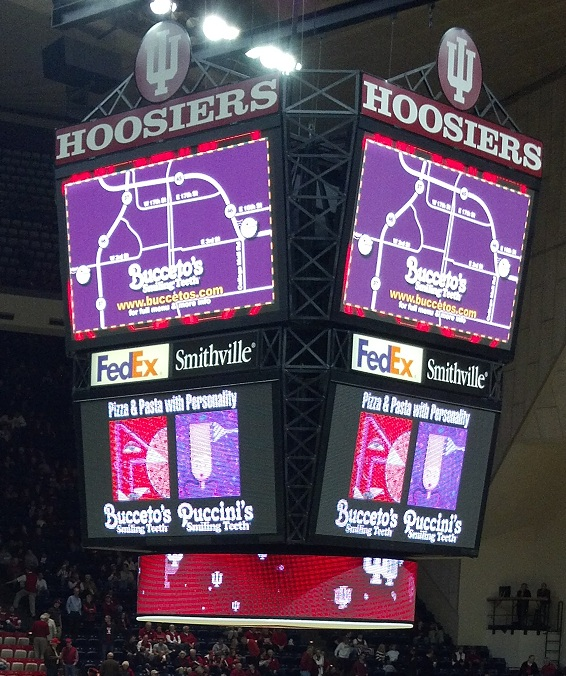
Assembly Hall score/replay board, added in 2005

New bleacher seats were installed in 1995.

Bob Knight feared that when he left Indiana, commercials would begin being played in the hall. Knight said, "You'll see a new Assembly Hall this year I'm sure. There will probably be ads in it for everything from dog biscuits to Pepsi Cola, I would imagine. We've always tried to keep it really free from commercialism. It's kind of a sacred place where students come to play and students come to cheer." In 2005, the school built a new scoreboard costing nearly $2 million, to mixed reviews.

Cook Hall, a new 67,000 square feet (6,200 m^{2}) practice facility, was built near Assembly Hall in 2010.

=== 2015 renovation and renaming ===
On December 19, 2013, Indiana University announced that a $40 million donation from Cynthia "Cindy" Simon Skjodt, daughter of late shopping mall magnate and Indiana Pacers owner Mel Simon, would be used to renovate Assembly Hall. Indiana University renamed Assembly Hall the Simon Skjodt Assembly Hall upon the completion of the renovations and improvements in October 2016.

=== Safety issues ===
On February 18, 2014, an 8-foot (2.4 m) long beam over a foot wide fell and damaged the seats at Assembly Hall. The scheduled game for that day against the University of Iowa was postponed due to safety concerns in spite of multiple available arenas in Indiana.

On January 28, 2023, a bracket over a foot long fell onto the court at Assembly Hall during halftime against the Ohio State Buckeyes.

== Atmosphere and success ==
A 2012 poll of four ESPN pundits ranked it third in terms of best home-court advantages in the country. Since opening for the 1971–72 season, over six million fans have attended men's basketball games at Assembly Hall. The men's team has been historically successful there, posting home winning streaks of 50 and 35 games.

During the 2015–2016 basketball season, both the men's and women's teams went undefeated at Assembly Hall, posting a combined 33–0 record at home.

== Men's home record by year ==
Year	Record	Win percentage
1971-72	10-1	.909
1972-73	12-0	1.000
1973-74	10-1	.909
1974-75	15-0	1.000
1975-76	13-0	1.000
1976-77	9-5	.643
1977-78	14-1	.933
1978-79	12-2	.857
1979-80	13-1	.929
1980-81	12-2	.857
1981-82	13-1	.929
1982-83	13-1	.929
1983-84	12-3	.800
1984-85	7-7	.500
1985-86	13-2	.867
1986-87	15-0	1.000
1987-88	13-2	.867
1988-89	14-1	.933
1989-90	11-4	.733
1990-91	11-2	.846
1991-92	14-0	1.000
1992-93	15-0	1.000
1993-94	13-0	1.000
1994-95	11-2	.846
1995-96	11-2	.846
1996-97	11-3	.786
1997-98	10-2	.833
1998-99	11-3	.786
1999-00	10-2	.833
2000-01	13-2	.867
2001-02	10-1	.909
2002-03	11-1	.917
2003-04	6-7	.462
2004-05	12-3	.800
2005-06	10-3	.769
2006-07	15-0	1.000
2007-08	16-2	.889
2008-09	5-10	.333
2009-10	8-9	.471
2010-11	12-6	.667
2011-12	18-1	.947
2012-13	17-2	.895
2013-14	14-4	.778
2014-15	15-4	.789
2015-16	15-0	1.000
2016-17	14-4	.778
2017-18	12-6	.667
2018-19	15-6	.714
2019-20	15-4	.789
2020-21	6-6	.500
2021-22	14-4	.765
2022-23	15-2	.882
2023-24	13-5	.722
2024-25	14-4	.765
2025-26	13-2	.867

Overall: 607-142 (.810)

== Proposed replacement ==
On June 22, 2007, Indiana University trustees approved the demolition of Assembly Hall and the construction of a new basketball arena "when appropriate". Populous was hired to assess the benefits of renovating or replacing Assembly Hall. The trustees decided against renovating the arena for $115 million because construction of a new arena would cost $130 million. This idea was scrapped due to the university changing course and opting to renovate Assembly Hall.

== Events ==
- Bob Hope & Petula Clark – September 12, 1971 (football Homecoming)
- Jesus Christ Superstar – Fall 1971
- The Temptations – April 28, 1972
- The Jackson 5 – April 29, 1972
- Seals and Crofts – September 14, 1972
- Stephen Stills – October 19, 1972, with Manassas
- Elton John – October 7, 1973
- The Doobie Brothers – December 8, 1973
- Bob Dylan – February 3, 1974, with The Band and October 19, 2007, with Elvis Costello and Amos Lee
- The Electric Light Orchestra – April 19, 1974, and November 7, 1981, with Hall & Oates
- Elvis Presley & the TCB Band – June 27, 1974, and May 27, 1976
- The Beach Boys – September 1, 1974, with the Eagles and Kansas and October 17, 1981, with Red Rider
- John Denver – October 5, 1974
- Traffic – October 18, 1974, with Fairport Convention
- Blue Öyster Cult – November 10, 1974, with Aerosmith and October 26, 1980, with Molly Hatchet
- Gordon Lightfoot – January 31 and April 5, 1975
- The Rolling Stones – July 26, 1975
- Jethro Tull – October 31, 1975
- The Who – November 30, 1975
- The Grateful Dead – October 30, 1977
- Sub-regional NCAA basketball tournament games – 1977 and 1979
- Genesis – April 9, 1978
- Frank Zappa – September 24, 1978
- Little Feat – October 1, 1978
- Elvis Costello & The Attractions – April 10, 1979, with The Rubinoos
- Yes – April 10, 1979
- Kansas – October 5, 1979, and September 19, 1982, with Survivor
- The Eagles – October 12, 1979
- Jackson Browne – September 14, 1980
- Midwest regional finals of the NCAA basketball tournament – 1981
- Barry Manilow – October 6, 1981
- ELO with special guest Hall & Oates – November 7, 1981
- Neil Diamond – September 9, 1982
- Dan Fogelberg – October 9, 1982
- Phil Collins – January 29, 1983
- Jimmy Buffett & the Coral Reefer Band – April 11, 1983
- Neil Young – September 16, 1983, with the Shocking Pinks
- Chicago – December 4, 1984
- Supertramp – October 12, 1985, with The Motels
- Sting – February 24, 1988
- Bush – April 20, 1996, with No Doubt and the Goo Goo Dolls
- The Canadian Brass – August 19, 1996
- The Smashing Pumpkins – January 18, 1997, with Fountains of Wayne
- The Counting Crows – February 20, 1997
- Bill Gates – October 12, 1998
- Tom Petty and the Heartbreakers – October 6, 1999
- The Red Hot Chili Peppers – April 8, 2000, with the Foo Fighters and Muse
- John Mellencamp – November 3, 2002
- Def Leppard – October 28, 2006, with Journey and Stoll Vaughan
- Bill Clinton – April 2, 2008
- Dave Matthews and Tim Reynolds – April 7, 2008
- Hillary Clinton – April 25, 2008
- Barack Obama – April 30, 2008
- Lil Wayne – April 12, 2011, with Jeezy, Rick Ross and Nicki Minaj
- The Little 500 Concerts – April 12, 2011, and April 20, 2012
- Afrojack – April 18, 2012
- Macklemore – April 17, 2013
- Lil Wayne – March 3, 2016
- Luke Bryan and Brett Eldredge – February 17, 2017
- Neil deGrasse Tyson – March 22, 2017
- Daniel Tosh – April 18, 2017
- DJ Mad Dog - September 28, 2019
- First Four and First Round games of the NCAA basketball tournament – March 2021
- 2022 first- and second-round games of the NCAA Women's Tournament
- A Boogie Wit da Hoodie - April 11, 2026

== See also ==
- Indiana–Kentucky rivalry
- Indiana–Purdue rivalry
- Illinois–Indiana men's basketball rivalry
- List of NCAA Division I basketball arenas
- List of indoor arenas in the United States
- List of music venues in the United States
