= Tommyknocker (producer) =

Italian DJ and record producer

- Born: Tommaso Marra; January 20, 1977 (age 49)
- Origin: Italy
- Genres: Hardcore
- Years active: 1995 - present
- Label: Traxtorm Records
- Website: https://web.archive.org/web/20120507070920/http://www.traxtorm.com/tommyknocker/?lang=en

Tommaso Marra (born January 20, 1977, in Rome, Italy), best known as Tommyknocker, is a Hardcore producer and DJ.

== Career ==
In 1992, Tommyknocker bought his first set of turntables. Two years later, he discovered hardcore music. When he was captivated by that genre, he entered the underground rave scene by spinning at illegal raves in Rome, and at parties with an atmosphere and sound that very much influenced Tommyknocker as an artist.

The name Tommyknocker appeared for the first time on a flyer in 1995 when Tommyknocker started spinning for Freddy K at clubs and on the radio. He was one of the first DJs to play hardcore in Italian clubs. He became a resident DJ at the Oxygen parties, where he came in contact with Hardcore artists from other countries, specifically the Netherlands, thereby broadening his musical horizons.

In the following years, Tommyknocker continued playing hardcore in Rome, and by 1998, he decided to begin producing music. Tommyknocker was inspired by artists such as Promo, Stunned Guys, PCP, Miro, and Lory D. By 1999, Tommyknocker had released his first EP "The Realm" on Traxtorm Records.

Over the next few years, without having achieved a critical breakthrough hit, Tommyknocker released his hit EP Showtime in 2003, featuring Demolition and Showtime. This release exemplifies why he has gained a reputation in the hardcore scene as a DJ who heavily favors distorted bass and angry vocals. After this release, Tommyknocker moved to Belgium to keep up with incoming bookings in Western Europe. Since then, he has regularly played at major Hardcore events such as Masters of Hardcore, Decibel Outdoor, Raving Nightmare, Defqon.1 Festival, and Q-Base. In 2005, Tommyknocker performed in front of the biggest crowd he had ever played for at the famous Thunderdome festival. To this day, Tommyknocker plays for the crowds all over Europe, including Australia. His next release, "Twisted World", a collaboration done together with The Viper, hit the first position in the Masters Of Hardcore Radio Live top 100 in 2007. By 2009, Tommyknocker released the track "Criminal". The track is influenced by the 1990s hardcore techno, with a message about government corruption that resonated loudly with both fans and fellow producers. As a result, the track received second place in the Masters Of Hardcore Radio Live Top 100.

In 2010, Tommyknocker returned to Rome, where he now currently lives.

== Discography ==
Year	Artist	Title	Label
1999	Tommyknocker & MC Lob	The Realm (12")	Traxtorm Records
2001	Tommyknocker	Fuck This Track Up (12")	Impulse Records
2001	Tommyknocker	Volume On The Dancefloor (12")	Traxtorm Records
2002	Tommyknocker	T-2002 (12")	Traxtorm Records
2002	Tommyknocker	T-2002 (12")	Hard Traxx
2002	Tommyknocker vs. DJ Mad Dog	Clockwork (10")	Traxtorm Records Sinful Edition
2003	Tommyknocker	Showtime (12")	Traxtorm Records
2003	Tommyknocker & The Stunned Guys vs. Paul Elstak	Hardcore Takin' Over / Battle With The Mind (Remixes) (12")	Total Hardcore Records
2004	Tommyknocker	Revolution (12")	Traxtorm Records
2004	Paul Elstak vs. Tommyknocker	Danger Danger (12")	Offensive Records
2004	The Viper & Tommyknocker	The Prophecy Unfolds (12")	Traxtorm Records
2005	Tommyknocker & The Stunned Guys & DJ Mad Dog	Our Thing E.P. (12")	Traxtorm Records
2005	Tommyknocker & The DJ Producer ft. MC Justice	Raving Nightmare - Nocturnal Rituals (12")	Underground House Movement
2006	Tommyknocker	Domination(12")	Traxtorm Records
2006	Tommyknocker & Unexist	Step Into Our World (12")	Traxtorm Records Sinful Edition
2006	Art Of Fighters vs. Tommyknocker	Follow Me (12")	Traxtorm Records
2006	Tommyknocker	Traxtorm Revamped 007 - Tommyknocker Special Edition (12")	Traxtorm Records Revamped
2007	Tommyknocker	Learn From The Pain (12")	Traxtorm Records
2007	Tommyknocker vs. Sunbeam	Twisted World (10", S/Sided)	Traxtorm Records
2007	Tieum & Tommyknocker	Post Traumatic Stress (12")	Altern-Hate
2009	Tommyknocker	Criminal (12")	Traxtorm Records
2010	Tommyknocker feat. Ian K	Scream	Traxtorm Records
2012	Tommyknocker	T-2012	Traxtorm Records
2012	Tommyknocker feat. The Wishmaster	Supernatural	Traxtorm Records
