= Neophyte Records =

Neophyte Records is a Dutch record label founded in 1999 by the hardcore music group Neophyte, focusing on hardcore music and its associated subgenres. It is a sublabel of 57 Music. With over 420 million worldwide streams as of 2025, it is among the most successful hardcore labels in the world.

Many of Neophyte Records' Artists have become household names in the hardcore space, performing at major festivals such as Defqon.1, Q-Base and Decibel Festival among others.

== History ==
Jeroen Streunding, one of the minds behind the Neophyte trio, launched Neophyte Records in 1999. For many, this was a puzzling decision; popularity of the hardcore subgenre was dwindling and the subculture associated with hardcore; gabber, was dying. However, Neophyte used to create music under the world's first ever hardcore label; Rotterdam Records, and had garnered a large following. His status as a pioneer of the genre itself and as one of the most popular hardcore creators meant that many of the scene's popular, established DJs such as Evil Activities and Tha Playah, as well as new and upcoming talent, were eager to join even during a "recession" in the genre's popularity, comparatively mitigating the risk for Neophyte more than any other artist at the time.

It is argued that Neophyte and Neophyte Records' vision on the genre was in fact so substantial that it determined the genre's very character. When Neophyte and Neophyte Records moved away from the characteristic "gabber" sound of old-school hardcore, nearly all major artists followed suit. Therefore releases on Neophyte Records are generally considered to be quintessentially "mainstream" hardcore, although from time to time tracks with a distinct "old-school" sound are still released, such as The Protest (2024).

Neophyte Records' first ever release is called Number One Fan, and was generally received positively by the public. It is the second ever release, however, that would later become known in the hardcore world: I Will Have That Power (1999) features in hardcore charts worldwide to this day. Other hits include Nobody Said It Was Easy (2008) by Evil Activities and Still Nr. 1 (2008) by Tha Playah.

In 2018 Neophyte Records released a special album called '30 Years of Neophyte' celebrating the trio's longstanding contribution to the label's existence and the subgenre of hardcore.

=== Sublabels ===
Neophyte Records has a sublabel called Smash Records as of 2017. Smash Records is a label owned by Tieum as a way for him to further express what he terms "his vision on the extreme side of hardcore."

=== Logo ===
The current Neophyte logo features a snake head, however, Neophyte's old logo; the "Neophyte wolf head" (nl: Neophyte Wolvenkop) is infamous in the Dutch hardcore world and especially within the gabber subculture. This logo is widely featured on bomber jackets, track suits and other hardcore paraphernalia of the 90s and early 2000s.

== Artists ==
Artists currently signed to Neophyte Records include:

- Neophyte
- Panic
- The Viper
- Nosferatu
- Restrained
- Never Surrender
- Gridkiller
- Hellsystem
- INVADE

Artists who have previously released music through Neophyte Records include:

- Evil Activities
- Masters of Ceremony
- Tha Playah
- Endymion
- D-Fence
- DJ Kasparov
- Tieum
- Joel Beukers
- MC Alee
- Drokz
- Furyan
- DJ ICHA
- Nexes
- Proto X
- Dazzler
- Scott Brown
- Karun
- Sakyra
- Angernoizer
- MC Ruffian
