= Frankie Bones =

American DJ

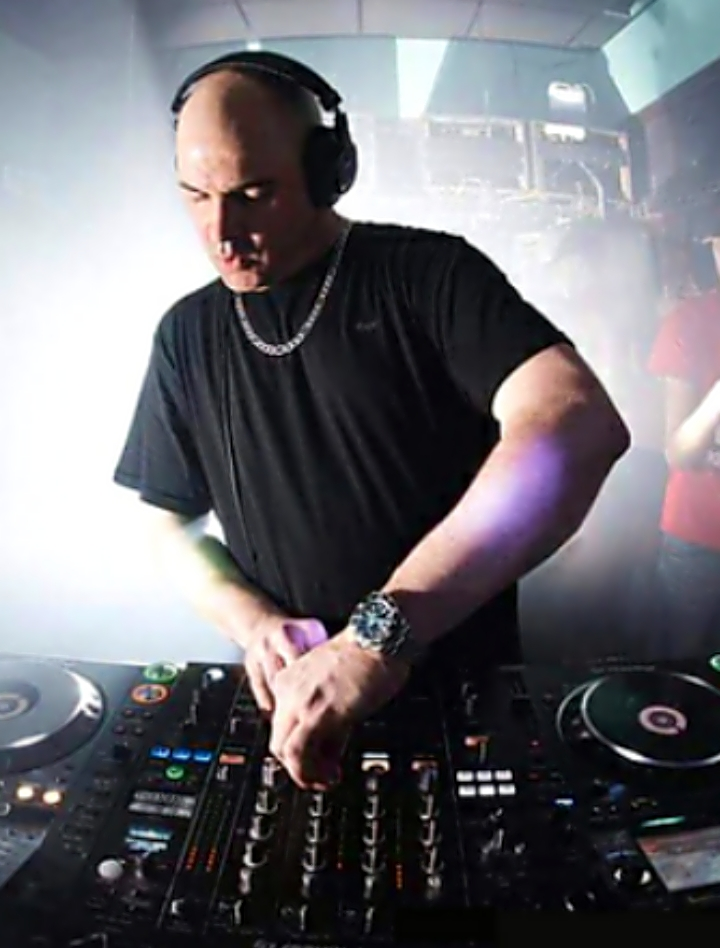
- Frankie Bones performing at Club Moog in Barcelona, Spain, 2018

Background information
- Born: Frankie "Bones" Mitchell
- Label: S1

Frankie "Bones" Mitchell is a prominent figure in the development of dance music in the United States, widely regarded as the “Godfather of American Rave Culture.” Throughout the 1980s and 1990s, Bones played a major role in shaping New York City’s underground party scene, particularly within the Techno genre. He began his career in the early 1980s, DJing at clubs and parties throughout New York and New Jersey.

Bones gained international recognition after organizing the first outdoor dance music parties in the U.S., known as Storm Rave, which took place in locations such as Williamsburg, Coney Island, and Plumb Beach. Over the course of his career, he has produced, remixed, and released numerous tracks, albums, EPs, and mixtapes. He has also performed at major music festivals around the world, including the Love Parade in Berlin and Insomniac’s Electric Daisy Carnival (EDC).

Frankie Bones remains an influential figure within the dance music community and continues to be active as a performer, producer, and author. He is represented globally by Southfirst (S1).

== Early life ==
Frankie 'Bones' Mitchell grew up in Brooklyn, New York. At 10 years old, he began roller skating at the Sheepshead Bay Roll-A-Palace, a family-friendly roller disco rink featuring live DJs (including a 17-year-old Lenny Dee).

Just before Frankie graduated high school, his father was murdered. The death radically changed Frankie's life, and he inherited his father's entire vinyl record collection. He began spinning records in 1981 and he began to produce house tracks with Lenny Dee.

His brother, Adam "X" Mitchell, is also a techno DJ and producer, and their colleague Heather Heart is a DJ and music writer/zine maker who helped create the community for underground techno music in New York and beyond. Bones, Adam X, Heather Heart and others are associated with the record label Sonic Groove. The three co-owned a record store with the same name at 41 Carmine St in New York City, where it had relocated to from a Brooklyn location in 1995. The shop closed in 2004.

== Bringing rave culture to America ==
After he had begun producing records, Bones was offered a gig to play for 5,000 people in England called "Energy". As the event started on August 26, 1989, he played to the unexpected number of 25,000 people.

Together with his brother, Adam "X" Mitchell, Bones took to forming his own event in Brooklyn in the form of a series of ″Storm Rave″ events that started on May 11, 1991. The events began with only a few hundred people in attendance growing to over thousands where the likes of Josh Wink, Doc Martin, Sven Väth, The Horrorist, DJ Keoki and Richie Hawtin were able to launch their performances into international careers.

Bones is recognized to have spread the idea of Peace, Love, Unity and Respect (PLUR) into rave culture. Supposedly in response to a fight that broke out at one of his Storm Raves in Brooklyn in June 1993, Bones is said to have got on the microphone and yelled: "If you don't start showing some peace, love, and unity, I'll break your faces." Other sources report that as early as "on July 4, 1990, [...] Frankie's brother and Storm Rave collaborator Adam X painted 'Peace Love Unity' on a train car".

Berlin's Love Parade, which had been generally considered to have been the largest rave festival in the world at the time, named its 1991 and 1992 parades after well-known compositions by Frankie Bones: "The Future is Ours" in 1991, and "My House is Your House (And Your House is Mine)" in 1992.

== Discography ==
=== Singles ===
- B2B (12") – ESP-SUN Records
- Dirty Job (12") – X-Sight Records
- High I.Q. (2x10") – Hyperspace
- In The Socket (12") – ESP-SUN Records
- The Candle EP (12") – High Octane Recordings
- The Mutha Fuckin Good Life (12") – Underground Construction
- The Way U Like It (12") – Bellboy Records
- We Call It Tekkno (12") – Bash Again!
- Baseball Fury (12") – Sonic Groove
- Masters Of The Hardgroove (12") – Hard To Swallow
- My House Is Your House (12") – Bash Again!
- Electrophonic (12") – E Series
- Filthy Dirty Animal Crackers (12") – Blueline Music
- Remains 10 (12") – Remains
- The Falcon Has Landed (12") – Hard To Swallow
- The US Ghetto Selecta (12") – Pro-Jex
- Speedometer EP (12") – Synchronicity Recordings
- Dangerous on the Dancefloor - Musto and Bones

=== 12" Vinyl Releases ===
- Bonesbreaks Volume 1 (LP) Underworld Records 1988
- Bonesbreaks Volume 2 (LP) Underworld Records 1988
- Looney Tunes Volume 1 (LP) Nugroove Records 1989
- Bonesbreaks Volume 3 (LP) Underworld Records 1989
- Call It Techno (12") Breaking Bones Records 1989
- New Grooves EP (12") Nugroove Records 1989
- Bonesbreaks Volume 4 (12") Breaking Bones Records 1990
- Bonesbreaks Volume 5 (12") Underworld Records 1990
- Call It Techno (12") JEP Records 1990
- Call It Techno (Remixes) (12") X Records (US) 1990
- Cross Bones E.P. (12") Rave Age Records 1991
- Crossbones E.P. (12") Fabulous Music UK 1991
- Bonesbreaks Volume 6 (12") Groove World 1992
- Trapezoid (12") Fabulous Music UK 1992
- Bonesbreaks 7 (Progressive Vibe EP) (12") Groove World 1993
- Bonesbreaks Volume 8 (Progressive Aggressive Freestyle EP) (12") Groove World 1993
- From Brooklyn With Love EP (12") Groove World 1993
- The Thunderground EP (12") Groove World 1993
- Thunderground E.P. (12") Fabulous Music UK 1993
- We Can Do This (12") Groove World 1993
- We Can Do This / Feel The Rush (Test Pressing) (12") Groove World 1993
- Bonesbreaks Volume 10 (12") Brooklyn Gutter Culture 1994
- The 2 Clues EP (12") Empire State Records 1994
- Bone Up! (LP) Trax Records 1995
- Bonesbreaks – The Unreleased Project (12") Music Station 1995
- Bonesbreaks Volume 10 (12") Hot Associated Label 1995
- Einstein e=me+3² (12") Drop Bass Network 1995
- Inside The Silverbox EP (12") Electric Music Foundation 1995
- Bonesbreaks Volume 11 (LP) Underworld Records 1996
- Climax Control (12") Hyperspace 1996
- Furthur (12") Drop Bass Network, Communique Records 1996
- My Peak (Promo) (12") Logic Records (US), Logic Records (US) 1996
- Rewind Tomorrow E.P. (12") Futurist 1996
- Technolo-G (12") ESP-SUN Records 1996
- Trackwerk Orange 1 (12") D-Dance 1996
- B2B (12") ESP-SUN Records 1997
- Ghetto Technics 1 (12") Ghetto Technics 1997
- Ghetto Technics 2 (12") Ghetto Technics 1997
- Inside Mr. Paul's Greybox (12") Futurist 1997
- Proceed With Caution EP (12") Electric Music Foundation 1997
- Dirty Job (12") X-Sight Records 1998
- Ghetto Technics 5 (12") Ghetto Technics 1998
- Ghetto Technics 7 (12") Ghetto Technics 1998
- Ghetto Technics 8 (12") Ghetto Technics 1998
- High I.Q. (2x10") Hyperspace 1998
- In The Socket (12") ESP-SUN Records 1998
- Rockaway Shuttle EP (12") Sonic Groove 1998
- The Candle EP (12") High Octane Recordings 1998
- Ghetto Technics 10 (12") Ghetto Technics 1999
- Ghetto Technics 11 (12") Ghetto Technics 1999
- Ghetto Technics 9 (12") Ghetto Technics 1999
- The Mutha Fuckin Good Life (12") Underground Construction 1999
- The Way U Like It (12") Bellboy Records 1999
- We Call It Tekkno (12") Bash Again! 1999
- America In Black & White EP (12") Bellboy Records 2000
- Baseball Fury (12") Sonic Groove 2000
- Bonesbreaks 2000 (12") Badmotherf#*ker 2000
- House Special EP (12") Urban Substance Records 2000
- My House Is Your House (12") Bash Again! 2000
- My House Is Your House (12") Bash Again! 2000
- The Saga EP (12") Pro-Jex 2000
- Electrophonic (12") E Series 2001
- Filthy Dirty Animal Crackers (12") Blueline Music 2001
- Ghetto Technics 14 (12") Ghetto Technics 2001
- Ghetto Technics 16 (12") Ghetto Technics 2001
- Ring Your Alarm EP (12") Pro-Jex 2001
- The Metropolitan EP (12") Missile Records 2001
- The Strength To Communicate (12") Remains 2001
- The US Ghetto Selecta (12") Pro-Jex 2001
- Turntable Specialist #1 (12") Hard To Swallow 2001
- And Here's Another Human Distraction (12") Remains 2002
- The Day After The Music Stopped EP (12") Hard To Swallow 2002
- The Lot Of People (12") Pro-Jex 2002
- The Thin Line Between Fantasy & Reality (2xLP) Pro-Jex 2002
- Underground Mash-Ups (12") Hard To Swallow 2003
- (Pro)File. (Pro)Duce. E.P. (12") The Last Label 2004
- Crash-Up On Interstate 95 (12") The Last Label 2004
- The Lot Of People (12") Pro-Jex 2004
- Unidentified (12") Kiddaz.fm 2004
- Speedometer EP (12") Synchronicity Recordings 2006
- The House of ODD (12") The Groove Shop 2006

=== Albums / DJ mixes ===
- DJ Techno Mix Vol. 1 (CD) – Beast Records
- Global House Culture Vol. 2 (CD) – ESP-SUN Records
- Computer Controlled (CD) – X-Sight Records
- Dance Madness And The Brooklyn Groove (CD) – BMG
- United DJs Of America Vol. 6 – Frankie Bones – Brooklyn, NY (CD) – Moonshine
- The Future is Ours - Musto and Bones - Citybeat / RCA (1990)
- Army Of One (CD) – System Recordings
- Al-Naafiysh (The Soul) Prof.File 2: Frankie Bones, Turntable Specialist (CD) (BML) (USA)
- Technolo-G (CD) Roadrunner Records (USA)(1998)
- You Know My Name (CD) Moonshine Music (2000)
- Escape from Brooklyn (CD)
- Factory 303 – Frankie Bones Continuous Mix (2000)
- Diary of a Raving Lunatic (CD) 1995
