= Ralphie Dee =

American DJ

Ralph D'Agostino
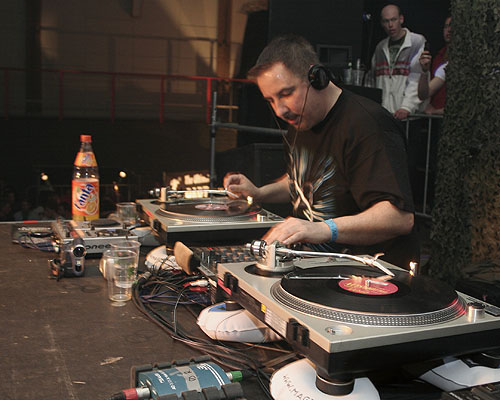
- Ralphie Dee at Digital Overdose 2008

Background information
- Also known as: Ralphie Dee
- Born: Ralph D'Agostino
- Genres: disco, electronic music, house and techno
- Occupations: Producer, DJ
- Years active: 1980s-present

Ralph D'Agostino, better known as Ralphie Dee, is an American D.J. known for a career spanning disco, electronic and rave music. He was resident D.J. at 2001 Odyssey Disco in Brooklyn, New York at the time when "Saturday Night Fever" was filmed there. The movie was largely responsible for the popularization of disco lifestyle, and attracted numerous tourists to 2001 Odyssey starting in 1978 and through the 1980s. Many disco music hits were first heard there from the hands of DJ's such as Chuck Rusinak and D'Agostino. Many live recordings were done at 2001 and are available online (See also the External links section).

Starting in 1978, Ralphie Dee was hired by WKTU to perform for lunch mixes and their nightly Saturday shows.

In the late 1980s he started a production career which began in the mid-1990s, and continues today, which resulted in a discography of more than 250 releases at a time when the rave scene began to take shape in the United Kingdom. The phase was marked by collaborations with Tommy Musto and Lenny Dee. With the latter he created pieces such as "Out Takes" (1989), "Overdose (The Final Trip)" and "Manslaughter" (the last two from the 1990 EP "Major Problems") under New York label Nu Groove. "Out Takes" caught the ear of promoters upon hitting the United Kingdom, which resulted in a tour over Europe in the year 1990. On his return to the United States, "Major Problems - Overdose" had entered the Record Mirror charts. Other prominent records include 3 EP's under the name "English Muffin" with Lenny Dee and "Chantal – The Realm" with Anthony Mannino and Dennis Pino as the a cappella on the record is one of the most sampled in techno history.

In 2007, Ralphie Dee was inducted into The Legends of Vinyl Hall of Fame. The year 2017 was the 40th anniversary of Saturday Night Fever's release as there were many concerts featuring the original artists who appeared on the album along with Ralphie appearing as the DJ. Since March 2020, during the COVID-19 pandemic he's been seen doing live video DJ sets in over 10 countries. He also appeared in 2021 True House Stories series with Lenny Fontana.

== 1980s venues ==
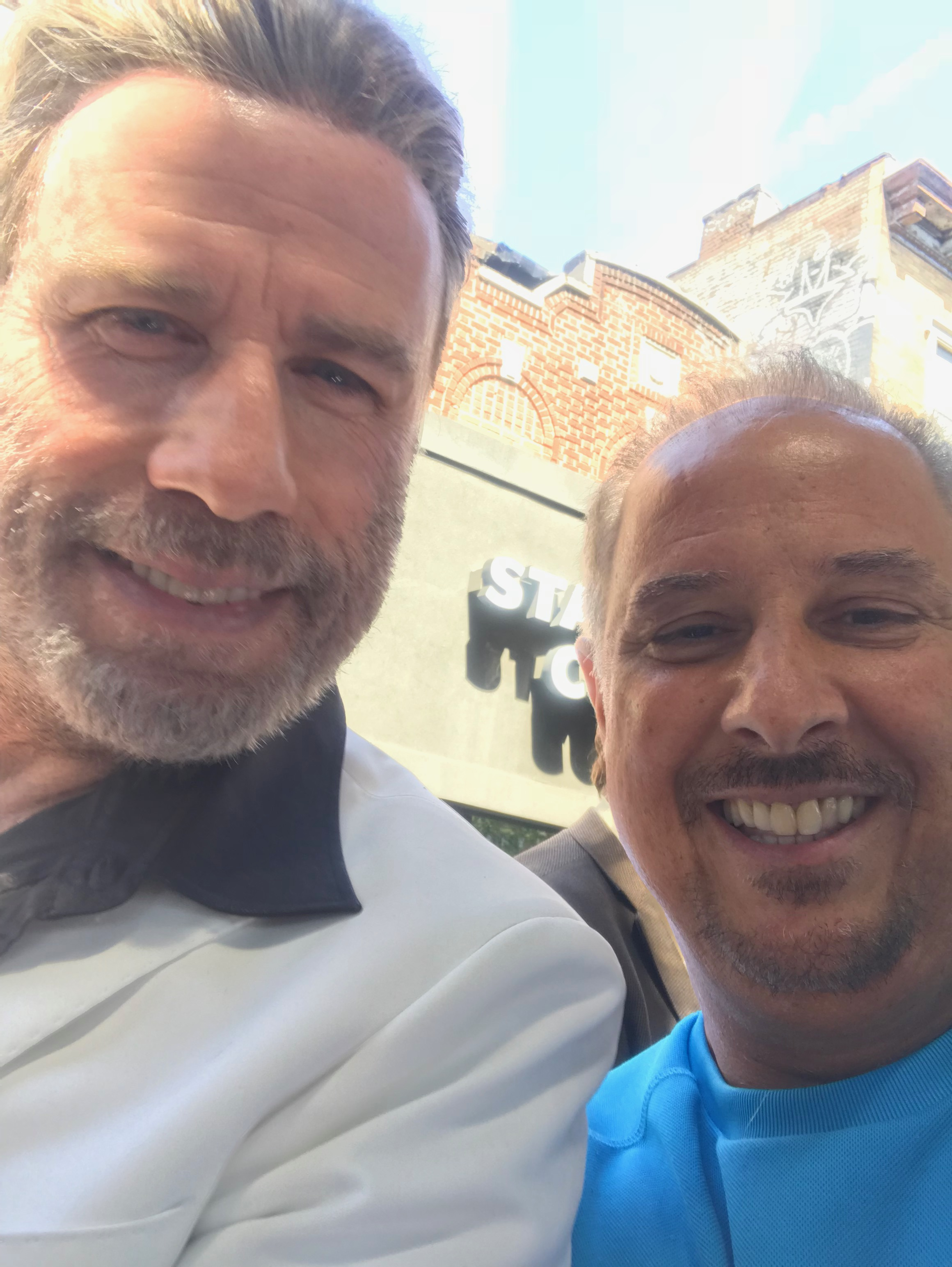
Ralph D'Agostino and John Travolta.

With the legacy of his time at 2001 Ralphie began playing at various clubs that had opened in Brooklyn, Queens, Long Island and Staten Island and Manhattan.

- 1981 Blossoms - Staten Island
- 1981 Haddar II - Staten Island
- 1982 Scarletts - Staten Island
- 1983 The Rooftop - Manhattan
- 1984 City Scene - Brooklyn
- 1984 City Scene On The Lake - Long Island
- 1984 Promotions - Brooklyn
- 1984 Club B - Brooklyn
- 1986 231 -Long Island
- 1986 Avanti - Queens
- 1986 Speaks - Long Island
- 1986 Metro 700 - Long Island
- 1987 21 Hudson - Manhattan
- 1987 Fokos -Long Island
- 1987 Pastels - Brooklyn
- 1989 Illusions - Brooklyn
- 1988 The Funhouse - Manhattan
- 1989 Palladium - Manhattan
- 1989 Tunnel - Manhattan
- 1989 Roxy - Manhattan

== 1990s selected world venues ==
- Q Bar - Bangkok, Thailand
- Clorophilla – Taranta, Italy
- Shadowlands (3 times) – various, Holland
- Cave Club – Salzburg, Austria
- Digital Overdose – Amsterdam, Holland
- Narcissus – Bangkok, Thailand
- Ultraschall – Munich, Germany
- Club UK / Final Frontier – London, England
- Rezerection (twice) – Edinburgh, Scotland
- Tresor – Berlin, Germany
- Energy 94' – Zurich, Switzerland
- Mazzo – Amsterdam, Holland
- Eurobeat 2000 (3times) – London, England
- Hellraiser (4 times) – Amsterdam, Holland
- Warehouse (Koln) – Koln, German
- Grand Slam – Berlin, Germany
- Cherrymoon – Gent, Belgium
- Planet E – Basel, Switzerland
- Rex Club (3 times) – Paris, France
- Palladium – New York City, New York
- Limelight – New York City, New York
- Cocorico – Riccione, Italy
- Danceteria – New York City, New York
- G Power 1 and 2 – Pavia, Italy

== Notable releases ==
- C'hantal - The Realm]
- English Muffin]
- Overdose]
- Primitive Passions (with Mustafa Alici)
- Cologne Summer (EP)
- Blip Trip (EP)
- New York Grooves (several volumes)
