= DJ Isis =

Isis van der Wel
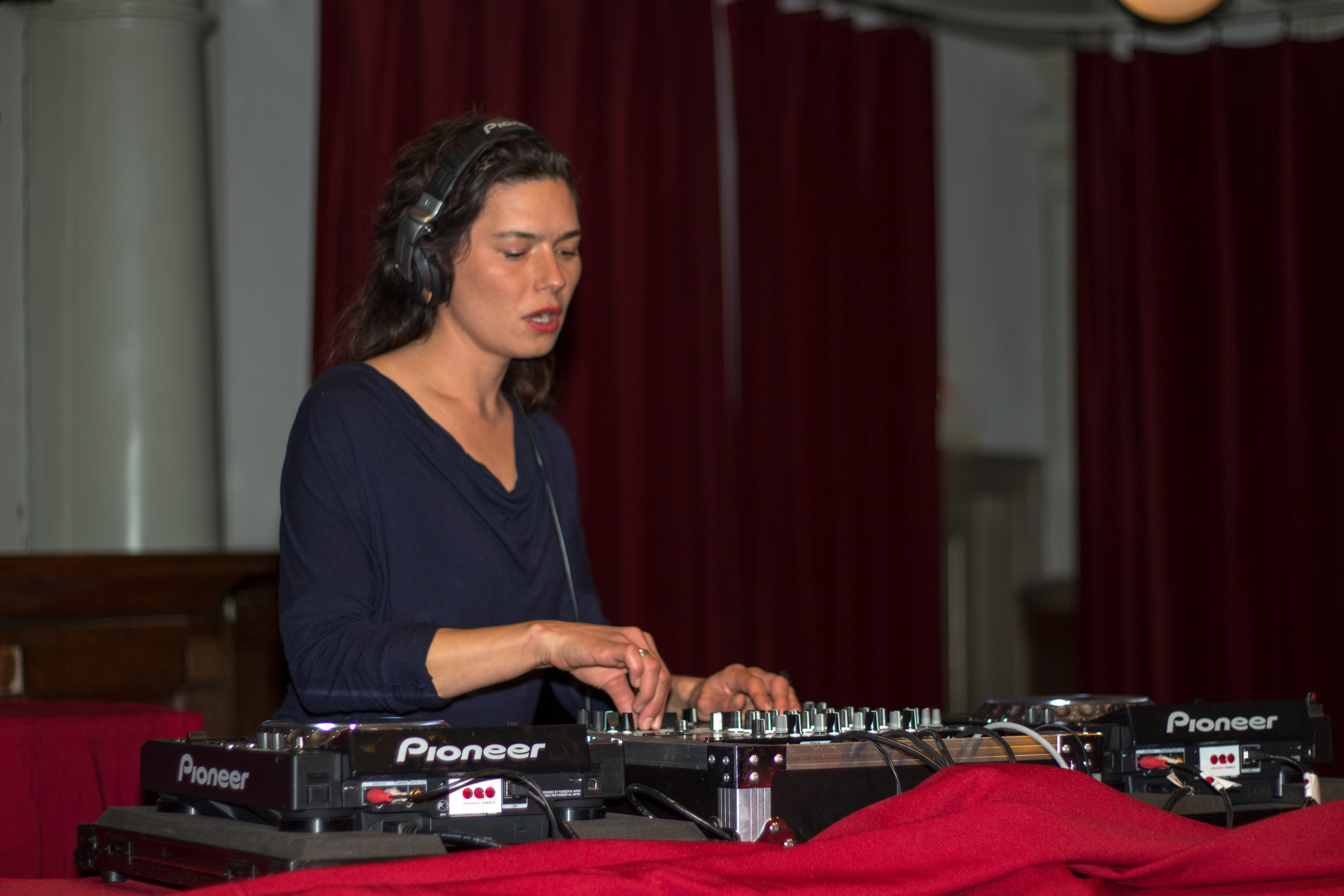

Background information
- Also known as: Isis
- Born: 29 April 1975 (age 51)
- Origin: Amsterdam, Netherlands
- Genres: Dance, tech house, house, ambient house, techno
- Occupations: DJ, DVJ, CEO
- Years active: 1987–present
- Label: All is One Records

Isis van der Wel (born 29 April 1975 in Amsterdam), better known by her stage name Isis (previously 100% Isis), is a Dutch DJ.

== Dj (100%) Isis ==
Van der Wel had already been assigned the stage name 100% Isis when she started her performance career at age 17 with a residency at Amsterdam club RoXY from 1992 -1994. This launched her long running International career, performing at dance venues and festivals in Europe, South America, Asia, USA and Africa. In 1993 she performed at a Prince concert in Brussels. Together with Eric Nouhan, Isis received her first production assignment in 1995 given by Bols. From 1995 until 2000 Isis became a resident DJ at Amsterdam club Chemistry (a.k.a. 'Escape', Rembrandtplein). In 1995 she was contracted by EMI, Virgin, Ariola, and BMG. In 1996 and 1997 Isis’ mix albums ("100% Isis 1" and "100% Isis 2") were ranked on various Electronic dance music national top ten charts. At the World Expo '98 in Lisbon Portugal, Isis performed as an official representative of the Netherlands. Isis was subsequently asked to perform during Holland Festival in 2000. Her mix album "Reformation" was ranked in the top ten mix albums of 2001. In 2002 her talent was recognized globally and she was ranked in top ten of worldwide female Tech-House DJ's. In 2003 she was ranked in the top 600 of the best DJ's worldwide. At the World Climate Summit 2009 in Copenhagen Isis achieved her audience capacity record, reaching up to 100,000 spectators. Crown Prince Willem Alexander was among the audience in 2010 as a special guest during an audio-visual performance by Isis at the Ridderzaal.

== Magma the Agency and All Is One ==
In 2000 Isis van der Wel founded the event production and artist management company called ‘Magma the Agency'. Magma the Agency was an artist agency and event production company which was organizing events under the name of 'All Is One'. Isis becomes responsible for programming and hosting an area at the world-renowned Mystery Land festival from 2003 through 2008. With 'All Is One' she hosts successful events and club nights, such as All Is One Weekend and Amsterdams Glorie. Furthermore, Isis is commissioned as an art director and promoter for events like Amsterdam dance event and Museumnacht Amsterdam.

== All Is One Records ==
In 2006 ‘All Is One Records’ was officially established. In 2008 'All is One' celebrated its first releases and presents the productions of young upcoming DJs and producers such as Arjuna Schiks and Daniel Zuur. The singles released build a bridge between different genres like Techno, House, Ambient and Experimental Dance music.

== Ambassador of Liberty ==
The National Committee for 4 and 5 May declared Isis as Ambassador of Liberty for the May 5 Dutch Independence day of 2009. This honourable title allowed her to join the queen for the annual May 4 Remembrance ceremony, continued by performing five big shows throughout the country on the next day, when May 5 national liberation day music festivals are held in prominent cities throughout the country.

== Nachtburgemeester Amsterdam (Nightlife Ambassador) ==
Isis was elected as the Nachtburgermeester of Amsterdam (Nightlife Ambassador) in 2010, and served as such for its 2-year term. Her function was to monitor the nightlife of Amsterdam and to build bridges between local politicians, entrepreneurs, artists and its audience. During her term she joined, and continued to be a part of, an expert team led by Eberhard van der Laan (Mayor of Amsterdam) to approve 24-hour permits for specific dance venues throughout the city.

== Magneet Festival ==
Another result of Isis’ Ambassadorship is the realization of the Magneet festival. Magneet Festival is a crowd-sourced festival that uses an online co-creation platform in order to assist in the programming of the event, a pioneering concept in Europe.

== Zevenmanschap ==
In 2011 she joined the ‘Zevenmanschap’, a committee headed by Andrée van Es and aimed at raising awareness of tolerance and discrimination in Amsterdam. It consists of seven key figures from Amsterdam of diverse cultural and religious backgrounds.

== Lifetime achievement award ==
Isis wins the Life Time Achievement Award in 2011 during the annual GK Awards for her outstanding achievements during her career as a prominent professional in the Dutch nightlife. Currently, Isis is extending her career to television, where she appears in several BNN TV shows, like ‘Vier Handen op 1 Buik’.

== 20-Year Anniversary ==
In April 2012, Isis celebrated her 20th year in the DJ business in Paradiso, marking her overall time in the business as one of the first professional women in worldwide dance culture, as well as an important member of the Dutch nightlife scene.

== From 100% Isis to Isis ==
In August 2006 Isis decided to change her alias. When she started back in 1991, she got the name 100% Isis. After 15 years she decided to stop using it and she prefers to be called Isis ever since. What she had to say about it:

100% ISIS has been my nickname since I was sixteen years old, like Lange Frans & 50 Cent are aliases. I didn’t come up with it. The printshop which printed the very first flyer that featured me used the name 100% ISIS. And there was no stopping it ever since. I am now at a point in my career that it’s time to make my name known as more than just an artist, but also as a human being which went through major developments. I am now a grown woman and my name is Isis.

== DJ Mix CDs ==
The following albums were top 10 nationally ranked.

- 100% Isis (EMI/Virgin/Ariola/BMG)
- 100% Isis 2 (EMI/Virgin/Ariola/BMG)
- Reformation (NEWS)
- Pulse (OXFAM NOVIB/ID&T/DANCETUNES)

All revenue collected from 'Pulse' goes to Girls' Power Initiative, a project for young girls in Nigeria.

== Discography ==
- Oriental Illusion - Isis & Eric Nouhanb - Bols 1995
- Eenhoorn - ISIS & Piet Jan Blauw - All is One Records 2008
- Ibiza Luna - ISIS & Piet Jan Blauw - All is One Records 2009
- Blandas - ISIS & Piet Jan Blauw - All is One Records 2009
- Liberté - ISIS - All is One Records 2009
- Liberté Remixes – ISIS – All is One Records 2009
