= Gabber =

Subgenre of hardcore music

- Stylistic origins: Acid house; hardcore; new beat
- Cultural origins: Early 1990s, Netherlands (Rotterdam)
- Typical instruments: Keyboards; synthesizers; drum machines; sequencers; samplers; bitcrushers

Subgenres
- Early hardcore; mainstream hardcore

Other topics
- Happy hardcore; hardvapour

Gabber (/ˈɡæbər/ GAB-ər; Dutch: [ˈɣɑbər]) is a style of electronic dance music and a subgenre of hardcore, as well as the surrounding subculture. The music is characterised by fast beats, distorted and heavy kickdrums, with dark themes and samples.

It formed as an underground, anti-establishment movement with small, underground raves, most often illegally held in empty warehouses, basements, and tunnels. Gabber remains highly popular in the Netherlands, and has seen a major resurgence in the late 2010s.

Rave parties such as Thunderdome, held by ID&T and Mysteryland, became hugely popular, eventually becoming part of mainstream Dutch culture in the 1990s. The music and culture quickly spread across Europe and the world, finding a home with the rave communities in countries such as the UK, Spain, Italy, US, and Australia.

== Origins ==
Gabber as a style of music was developed in Rotterdam and Amsterdam in the 1990s by producers like Marc Acardipane, Paul Elstak, DJ Rob, and The Prophet, forming record labels such as Rotterdam Records, Mokum Records, Pengo Records and Industrial Strength Records. It was derived from house and techno in the early 1990s. The musical style is described as "a relentless mix of superfast BPMs, distorted kickdrums, and roared vocals", blended with house-style breakbeats and hi-hat fillers. The music is generally between 140 and 190 beats per minute with samples taken from films or other tracks. One of the most characteristic components of gabber/early hardcore first appeared in the track "Anasthasia" (1991) from T99.

The word gabber comes from an Amsterdam Bargoens slang, based on the Hebrew chaver meaning "mate" or "friend", loaned through Yiddish. An Amsterdam DJ was asked about the hard Rotterdam scene and said "They're just a bunch of gabbers having fun". Having heard this, Paul Elstak etched in the vinyl on the first Euromasters record (released through Rotterdam Records in 1992), "Gabber zijn is geen schande!" ('It's not a disgrace to be a gabber!'). The identity gained popularity in the Rotterdam music scene and people started to call themselves "gabbers". Some, however, state that 'gabber' derives from usage at house clubs which gabbers visited, where 'gabber' became an insult that club security used to collectively describe these people, with often raucous and hooliganish behaviour, that were often seen as undesirable.

== Music ==
Influential early labels were DJ Paul Elstak's Rotterdam Records, Mokum Records in Amsterdam, and Lenny Dee's New York based Industrial Strength Recordings. Alongside Elstak and Dee, other early artists included Marc Acardipane, The Prophet, and Rotterdam Termination Source.

Elstak and DJ Rob organised parties first at Parkzicht in Rotterdam and when the numbers attending increased they moved to the Energiehal. ID&T later organised Thunderdome parties for up to 40,000 people, running for around twenty years before breaking then relaunching in 2017. When the sound spread to London in the mid-1990s, Dead by Dawn parties at the 121 Centre in Brixton played gabba, speedcore, and noise. In the Midwestern United States, gabber inspired the foundation of the label Drop Bass Network.

== Subculture ==
A man performing hakken, a dance unique to gabber

The popularity of gabber created a youth subculture in the Netherlands. Gabber ravers were often stereotyped as wearing tracksuits, bomber jackets, and Nike Air Max shoes. Tennis tracksuits from the Italian fashion label Australian by L'Alpina were prized, being often referred to as "Aussies", and possibly being related to the eshay subculture of Australia, where gabber was often listened to. Another popular brand in tracksuits was Cavello, which suits were more colorful than the straight forward designs by Australian. Most men shaved their heads bald, while women braided their hair and shaved the sides. Drug use was common, with ecstasy and speed the popular choices.

Later, a racist minority of predominantly young men wore the Lonsdale brand along with army pants and boots, because of the connections to right-wing extremism. Gabber also had a small following in the German Neo-Nazi fringe movement. In order to repudiate the connection, labels and artists began to release anti-fascist and anti-racist statements. Some examples include "Chosen Anthem (Against Racism)" by DJ Chosen Few, "Die Nazi Scum" by Party Animals featuring MC Rob Gee, "Time to Make a Stand" by United Hardcore, and "Fuck the Nazism" by Hellcore. Mokum Records made its slogan (printed on all records): "Hardcore united against fascism and racism". Some producers are themselves black, such as The Dark Raver and Loftgroover. When gabber became popular again in the 2000s, Dutch Neo-Nazis attempted to capitalize on it, but their attempts were short-lived.

By the mid-1990s, gabber had become part of mainstream culture in the Netherlands. Billboard magazine called it the country's "first homegrown youth culture" in 1997. Its popularity also led to parody tracks, such as Gabber Piet's "Hakke & Zage", which drew on the theme tune of the Peppi & Kokki children's television show. The name also referred to hakken, the style of gabber dancing characterized by fast leg movements that had become popular. Gabber fans were angered by the commercialization of their scene, and Gabber Piet was fired from his job at ID&T. His album Love U Hardcore attempted to make amends but it did not sell well.

The 2023 film Hardcore Never Dies is set during the 1990s gabber scene in Rotterdam, Netherlands.

== Artists ==
- 3 Steps Ahead
- Angerfist
- Charly Lownoise and Mental Theo
- Critical Mass
- Danger Hardcore Team
- Despairful Tomorrow
- DJ Mad Dog
- DJ Paul Elstak
- DJ Sharkey
- DJ Skinhead
- Evil Activities
- Euromasters
- The Horrorist
- Lenny Dee
- Marc Acardipane
- Miss K8
- Nasenbluten
- Neophyte
- The Outside Agency
- Party Animals
- The Prophet
- Ralphie Dee
- Rotterdam Termination Source
- Rotterdam Terror Corps
- Ruffneck
- Scott Brown
- Teranoid (alias of Kosuke Saito)
- Tommyknocker
- XOL DOG 400
