= Critical Mass (Dutch band) =

Dutch happy hardcore band

Critical Mass was a Dutch happy hardcore act that was active from 1994 till 1999 during the happy hardcore period. They scored several hits in the Netherlands. Members of the group were producer Huib Schippers, Dave van Hasselaar and Ed Bout. Later, female singer Ludmilla Odijk and rapper Danny Haenraets aka MC Energie joined the group.

== Biography ==
In 1994 producer Ed Bout came in contact with producer Dave van Hasselaar. Together they decided to form a new group. This duo received a request from hardcore/gabber-organisation ID&T records, to produce some radio-friendly hardcore. With the song "Dancing Together" Critical Mass scored a hit. That same year Critical Mass were given a face by female singer Ludmilla Odijk and rapper MC Energie.

In 1996 the band had a few hits with singles like "Burnin' Love", "Believe In The Future" and "Happy Generation". Later that year ID&T announced that Critical Mass would be combined with 2 Unlimited. In 1997, when happy hardcore became less popular in the Netherlands, the single "Together In Dreams" was produced. This single was a lot less successful than expected. Bout and Van Hasselaar decided to change their career by trying different styles of music. In 1999 their last single came out, called "In Your Eyes".

In 2008, the group came back together, with their original line-up, to perform on different happy hardcore parties.

== Discography ==
Single title	Release date	Charting in the Dutch Top 40			Comments
Single title	Release date	Date of entry	Highest	Weeks	Comments
Psychotic Break	1994				Label: Rough Trade
Burnin' Love	1995				
Dancing Together	1995	26-8-1995	37	3	
Burnin' Love	1996	20-1-1996	9	10	Re-release
Believe In The Future	1996	15-6-1996	10	7	
Happy Generation	1996	28-12-1996	23	6	
Together In Dreams	1997				
In Your Eyes	1999				Label: BYTE
