= Euromasters =

Dutch gabber act

Euromasters is a gabber act from the Netherlands. Different producers have contributed to this project, although the performances were always done by Rob Christensen (Masters of Ceremony) and Fabian Kruizinga.

== Members ==
Member (Real Name)	Alias
H.Reefboer & T.Hooihouse	De Klootzakken
Vincent Hendriks	Harm Reefboer
Otto van den Toorn	Teun Hooihouse
Paul Roger Elstak	Paul Elstak / Stek
Rob Christensen	Rob Christensen
Rob Fabrie	Rob Fabrie

== Releases ==
Release	Label	Year
Alles Naar De Klote (12")	Rotterdam Records	1992
Alles Naar De Klote (CD, Maxi)	Polydor (Germany)	1992
Alles Naar De Klote (12")	Rising High Records	1992
Alles Naar De Klote (CD, Maxi)	Rotterdam Records	1992

== Appearances ==
Appearance	Producer	Year
Mystery Land - The Video (VHS)	Arcade	1994
Megarave - New Year Party (VHS)	Megarave Records	1997

== Mixes in which tracks are used on ==
Mix	Label	Year
Best Of A Nightmare In Rotterdam (2xCD)	Central Station	
History Of Rotterdam Hardcore Part 1 (12")	Rotterdam Records Classics	
