= Lenny Dee (DJ) =

American DJ

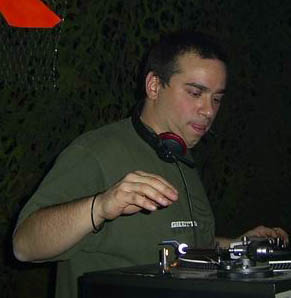

Lenny Dee (born 1968) is the performing name of Leonard Didesiderio, a DJ based in New York City. Starting as a house DJ in the 1980s, Dee quickly moved towards harder sounds such as techno and gabber. He set up the well respected record label Industrial Strength in 1991.

== Early life ==
Leonard Didesiderio was born in 1968. He grew up in Sheepshead Bay, Brooklyn and became a DJ at 17, when he started working at the local roller disco, the Sheepshead Bay Roll-A-Palace.

Taking the DJ name Lenny Dee, he made his first record in 1985. He started playing house music and developed a rivalry with Frankie Bones, another young DJ. Tommy Musto told the two to work together and they started music under the name Looney Tunes. Their first record sold 15,000 copies and they were invited to England to play at raves. When he travelled through Europe, playing at dance parties in Belgium, the Netherlands and Germany, Dee's style became harder and faster. He started making techno and gabber.

== Career ==
Not having trained as a musician, Dee taught himself to DJ and produce records. He began to work as a production assistant for Arthur Baker and later produced sample collections of loops. Having started DJing with vinyl, Dee later moved to using Pro Tools. Dee has played at many venues worldwide and at festivals such as Electric Daisy Carnival, Love Parade and Tomorrowland. He played at the 25th anniversary party of Thunderdome in 2017.

== Industrial Strength Records ==
Lenny Dee founded Industrial Strength Records in 1991. The first release was a double A side from Marc Acardipane, whom Dee met when he was stranded after playing at a rave in Frankfurt. Acardipane offered him a place to stay and played him some tracks. Dee promised to release them, then IS001 became "We Have Arrived" by Mescalinum United and "Nightflight" by The Mover (both artist names being pseudonyms of Acardipane). Industrial Strength has released records from Dee himself and amongst others Thomas Bangalter, Ralphie Dee and Nasenbluten.
