= DJ Mad Dog =

Italian DJ and record producer

- Born: Filippo Calcagni; November 2, 1980 (age 45); Rome, Italy
- Genres: Hardcore techno; gabber; hard techno
- Occupations: DJ; record producer
- Years active: 1995–present
- Labels: Traxtorm Records (2001–2016); Dogfight Records (2016–present)
- Formerly of: Hardcore Terrorists
- Website: djmaddog.com

Filippo Calcagni (born 2 November 1980), known by his stage name DJ Mad Dog, is an Italian hardcore/gabber DJ and record producer living in the Netherlands. He is the owner of the hardcore/gabber record label Dogfight Records.

== Early life ==
Filippo Calcagni was born on November 2, 1980, in Rome, Italy.

== Career ==
=== 1995–1999: Hardcore Terrorists ===
At the age of 16, Calcagni started his music career with his friends as a musical act called Hardcore Terrorists. However, on the 26th of January, 1999, this group only released one EP titled Try To Make It Harder.

Despite this, Calcagni became one of the most popular hardcore techno artists in Italy.

=== 2000–2009: Solo career ===
Calcagni left Hardcore Terrorists to embark on a solo career, in the summer of 2000. He was the signed to Traxtorm Records, a hardcore techno label created by the Italian DJ duo The Stunned Guys.

In 2006, he participated in the A Nightmare in Rotterdam festival and created the track "Enter the Time Machine" with Dutch hardcore DJ and record producer Tha Playah.

=== 2010–2015: Rise in popularity ===
In 2010, Calcagni released his first EP titled The Flow, which he played at festivals such as Syndicate 2010. In 2011, he released his first album, which was entitled A Night of Madness. This album reflected the first ten years of his career.

In 2012, Calcagni participated in the Thrillogy 2012 event alongside Italian hardstyle DJ Zatox and Polish hardstyle DJ Crypsis. In 2013, he performed at the Q-Base festival alongside other artists such as: Acti, Ran-D, Hellfish, and Verdict.

On the 6th of November, 2013, Calcagni released this second studio album Rudeness: Hardcore Beyond the Rules.

=== 2016–present: Dogfight Records ===
In 2016, Calcagni founded his own record label Dogfight Records, which houses other artists such as Unexist, Tears of Fury, and AniMe.

in 2017, he released his third studio album Till I Die, which contains 30 tracks. Around the same year, Calcagni performed at the French festival Born to Rave and at the Dutch festival Dominator.

In 2018, he performed at the Polish festival Festiwal Beats 4 Life, with fellow Italian DJ AniMe, and at the Electric Daisy Carnival in Las Vegas, Nevada, US.

In 2019, Calcagni's track called "Reset", which was composed as a tribute/throwback to the early hardcore scene of the 1990s, came second on the annual Masters of Hardcore chart, just behind Angerfist and Tha Playah.

== Discography ==
=== Releases ===
Year	Title	Additional Artist(s)	Label	Release Type
2006	"Enter the Time Machine"	Tha Playah	N/A	Single
2010	The Flow		Traxtorm Records	Extended play
2011	"A Night of Madness"		Traxtorm Records	Single
2012	A Night of Madness		Traxtorm Records	Studio album
2013	Rudness: Hardcore Beyond the Rules		Traxtorm Records	Studio album
2017	Till I Die		Dogfight Records	Studio album
2019	"Reset"		Dogfight Records	Single
2022	Sounds of the Millenium		Dogfight Records	Extended play
2023	DOWNTEMPO		Dogfight Records	Studio album
2023	"Xtreme Audio (Official Thunderdome Anthem 2023)"		Thunderdome Music	Single
2024	"Fade To Black"	Dr. Peacock	Dogfight Records	Single
2025	Mutation		Dogfight Records	Extended play
