= Rotterdam Termination Source =

Dutch gabber/hardcore group

Rotterdam Termination Source is a Dutch gabber/hardcore group fronted by Maurice Steenbergen, initially with Danny Scholte as well. The group is most famous for its minimalist 1992 single "Poing", which topped the charts in the Netherlands and Denmark, and reached #27 in the UK Singles Chart.

The group reached #73 in the UK chart in 1993 with the single, "Merry X-Mess". As of 2005, Steenbergen has merged the group with Guido Pernet of Human Resource, famous for their hit single "Dominator".

== Poing ==
Poing is a gabber track by the Rotterdam Termination Source released by Rotterdam Records in 1992. The song, composed by Maurice Steenbergen and Danny Scholte, took a minimalist approach: during the whole length of the track, a distinctive pounding beat with a "poing" sound can be heard. The track topped the charts in the Netherlands and Denmark. It reached number 27 in the UK chart in November 1992.

The English football team West Bromwich Albion F.C.'s "Boing Boing" crowd chant is reportedly based on this track.
