= Starving Insect =

Swedish DJ and record producer

- Also known as: Despairful Tomorrow
- Born: Alexander Kassberg; 1988 (age 37–38)
- Origin: Stockholm, Sweden
- Genres: Hardcore techno; doomcore; industrial hardcore
- Occupations: DJ; record producer
- Years active: 2004–present
- Labels: PRSPCT Recordings [as Starving Insect]; Mokum Records [as Despairful Tomorrow]

Alexander Kassberg (born circa 1988) (Note: This is an estimate as Kassberg was 16 in 2004 (the time he started his career)), known professionally by his pseudonym Starving Insect (earlier on known as Despairful Tomorrow) is a Swedish hardcore techno DJ and record producer, who specializes in doomcore and industrial hardcore.

== Career ==
Kassberg started releasing music under the stage name Despairful Tomorrow.

His main release being "And Hell Followed With" on Mokum Records.

He then starting releasing doomcore and industrial hardcore tracks under the Starving Insect alias, with his first major release being the album The Great Nothing.

In 2025, Kassberg performed at Dominator 2025 Anniversary Edition.

== Discography ==
=== Studio albums ===
- The Great Nothing (2015)
- Gospel of the Worm (2022)

=== Extended plays ===
- And Hell Followed With (as Despairful Tomorrow, 2004)
- Forget The Rapture, Prepare To Rot (2012)
- Acid Avengers 023 (split with Crystal Geometry, 2022)
- Wisdom From The Waste (with Catscan, 2023)
- Blind Idiot God (2024)

=== Singles ===
- "The Deafening How of a Dead Future" (with Omnicide, 2012)
- "The Rainmaker" (2022)
- "The Creeper" (with Catscan, 2026)
