= Oliver Chesler =

American electronic music artist

The Horrorist
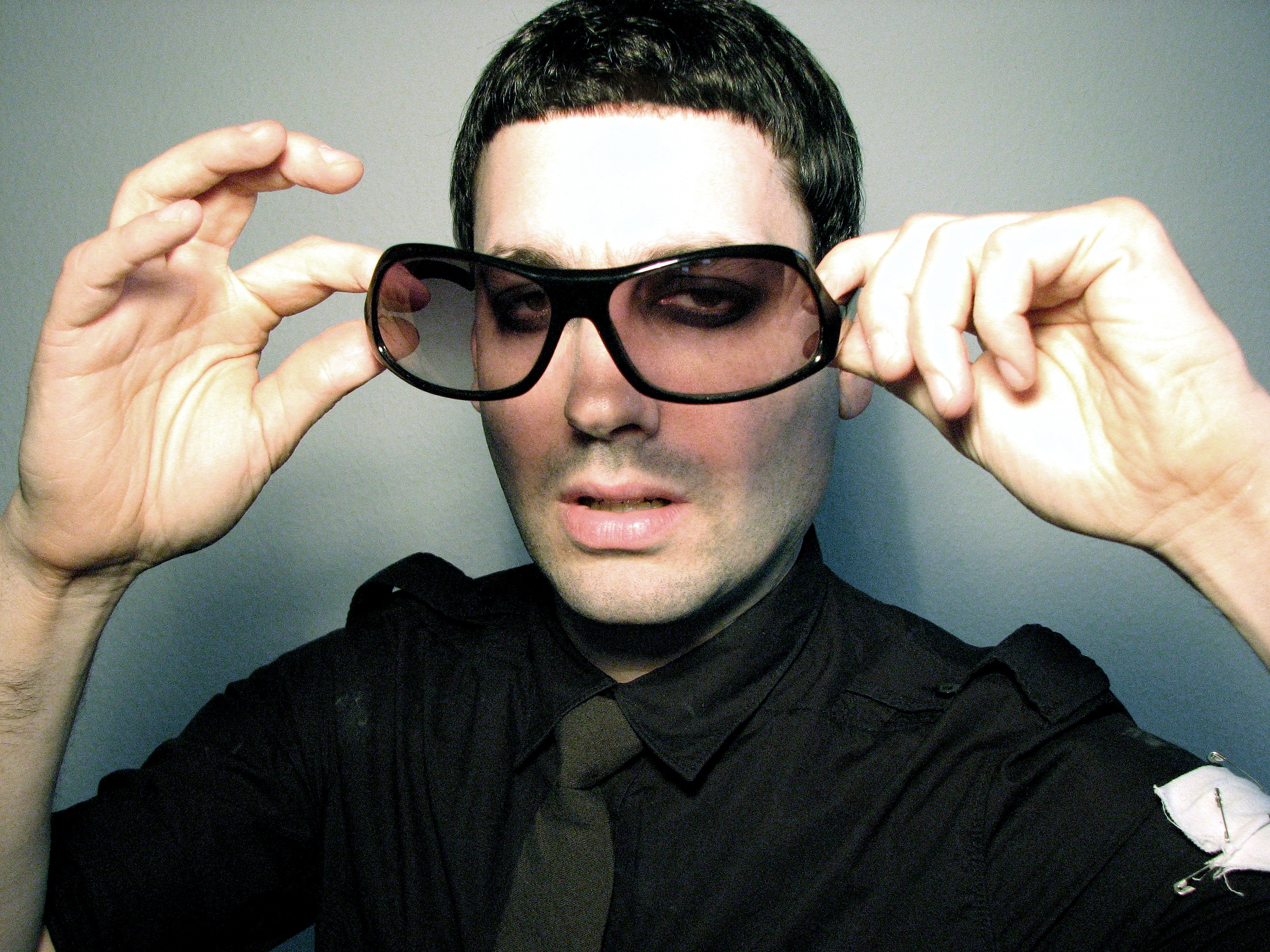
- Oliver Chesler in 2007

Background information
- Origin: New York, NY, US
- Genres: Hardcore techno, gabber, EBM, industrial techno, electropunk, new wave, electronic
- Years active: 1996–present
- Labels: Out of Line Music; Things to Come Records; Aufnahme + Wiedergabe
- Members: Oliver Chesler
- Website: www.thehorrorist.com

Oliver Chesler (born January 20, 1970), better known by his stage name The Horrorist, is an American electronic music artist from New York City. He is the owner of the Things to Come Records. British music critic Simon Reynolds once proclaimed, "My favourite contemporary American singer-songwriter is Oliver Chesler, a/k/a The Horrorist."

== Career ==
=== Manic Panic project ===
The 2001 release "Manic Panic" contains tracks that describes some aspects of life in New York City, or any major (western) metropolis. The album features, what sounds like, actual samples of the answering machine of Oliver Chesler (aka. The Horrorist), giving the album a feel of being auto-biographic. On August 30, 2004 the album was re-released on Out of Line Music with a bonus disc containing an additional nine songs. The re-release went to No. 1 on the Deutsche (German) Alternative Chart on October 1, 2004. The album had four singles associated with it: "One Night in NYC", "Flesh is the Fever", "The Virus" and "Mission Ecstasy".

"One Night in NYC", a downbeat track, describes the experiences of a young innocent suburban girl during a night in New York City. The single hit No.1 on the Deutsche Dance Charts the first week of January 2001. In May 2001 for UK magazine MixMag, Pete Tong reviewed "One Night in NYC" and said, "Big records demand your attention, and this is bound to get yours... Love it hate it, you will certainly know when you've heard it." There were many 12" remix singles released for the song on several different record labels including Warner Music, Sony Music Entertainment, Superstar Recordings, CLR Recordings, A1 Records and Captivating Sounds. Some of the producers and DJs who contributed remixes include Chris Liebing, Pascal FEOS, Ricardo Villalobos and Orlando Voorn. Warner Music hired German firm Oktonet to produce the music video. It was directed by Nils Tim and shot in New York City at The Limelight club and live footage was shot in Frankfurt, Germany at the U60311 nightclub. For several weeks the video had B-rotation play on MTV and Viva (TV station) in Germany and The Netherlands. On February 10, 2002 The New Zealand Herald ran a story detailing how the Broadcasting Standards Authority banned the music video from airing again on TVNZ (Television New Zealand). In the story a man named Rod Valenta complained, "completely unacceptable for free-to-air television, especially during a weekend when children can view this damaging material".

"The Virus" is an upbeat, hardpumping track that describes what can happen "when people do evil things". The lyrics tell the story of a young man who was bullied throughout his life and later becomes addicted to drugs. He thinks up a plan for revenge. He creates a virus and then unleashes it to destroy the world . Initially there were two different 12" vinyl releases each with different remixes for The Virus on the German label a45 (a division of Edel Music). Some of the producers and DJs who contributed remixes include Ben Sims, Northern Lite, Citizen Art and Zeil 100. Later, in 2004 another German label Robot Traxx released newer remixes of The Virus. The release aptly titled "The Virus 2004" included remixes by Longy, DJ Falk & Plasma Beat and Fritz Laurent.

=== Recognitions ===
- His song "One Night in NYC" went to #1 on the Deutsche Dance Chart in 2001 (DDC).
- The re-release of his first album Manic Panic (extended version) went to #1 on the Deutsche Alternative Chart in 2004 (DAC).
- His second album Attack Decay went to #3 on the Deutsche Alternative Chart in 2007 (DAC).

=== Aliases ===
- DJ Cybersnuff
- DJ Silence
- Narcanosis
- DJ Skinhead
- Oliver Chesler

=== In Groups ===
- Arrivers
- SuperPower
- Temper Tantrum
- Disintegrator
- Koenig Cylinders

== Discography ==
=== Albums ===
==== As The Horrorist ====
- Manic Panic
- Attack Decay
- Joyless Pleasure
- Fire Funmania
- Separate Dimension
- The Sky is the Floor

=== Singles ===
==== As The Horrorist ====
- One Night in New York City
- Run For Your Life
- Flesh is the Fever
- The Virus
- Sex Machine
- Body to Body
- 13 Dobermans
- The Voice Of The Butcher
- Wire to The Ear
- Metal man
- Take this Step
- The Man Master
- Born this Way
- Haywire
- Here Comes the Whip
- Programmed

== Filmography ==
As a teenager in 1989, Chesler appeared in D. A. Pennebaker's documentary 101 as one of eight contest winners that got to travel with Depeche Mode on their Music for the Masses tour.
