= Rotterdam Terror Corps =

Dutch gabber act

- Also known as: RTC
- Origin: Rotterdam, Netherlands
- Genres: Hardcore techno, gabber
- Years active: 1993–present
- Label: Megarave Records
- Members: George Ruseler; Cyriel Brandon
- Past members: Ricky Peroti; Patrick Moerland; Peter van de Plaats; Rob Janssen; Matthijs Hazeleger; Eugenio Dowart; DJ Paul Elstak
- Website: www.rotterdamterrorcorps.com

Rotterdam Terror Corps, often abbreviated RTC, is a Dutch gabber act formed in 1993. Originally formed by five Dutch DJs (DJ Distortion, MC Raw, DJ Reanimator, DJ Petrov, and DJ Rob), currently there is only one of the original DJs left, DJ Distortion. DJ Petrov and DJ Rob left to pursue individual work. Reanimator (Patrick Moerland) produced the first album and left twice, the second time in 1995 permanently after an argument with DJ Distortion. In 2002 MC Raw was replaced by Cyriel Brandon, better known by his stage name "RTSier", for health reasons. RTSier is since that time the MC and live performer on stage. The group has gained a notoriety for its use of eroticism, with each live performance containing female strippers and pyrotechnics. After MC Raw was replaced, he was still able to perform occasionally.

DJ Distortion (George Ruseler) is the main producer while MC Raw (Ricky Peroti) used to add vocals, RTSier and other mc's like Lex Couper are doing the shows since 2016.

Rotterdam Terror Corps has also worked with many other DJs and producers, including Bass-D, The Headbanger, Neophyte, King Matthew, SRB/Dione and Dr. Macabre.

== Discography ==
- Three Wasted Souls (Megarave Records, 1995).
- Strictly Hardcore (Megarave Records, 1996).
- Sick and Twisted (Megarave Records, 1997).
- From Dusk till Doom (Megarave Records, 1998).
- 5 Years RTC, The Remix Album (Megarave Records, 1998).
- Constrictor (Megarave Records, 1999).
- Fuck the Millennium (Megarave Records, 1999).
- Schizophrenic (Megarave Records, 2000).
- Unleash Hell (Megarave Records, 2002).
- Giftbox (2005)
- Giftbox 2008 (DVD)
- Time To Kill Another One (Megarave Records, 2008)
- I Will Never Surrender (Megarave Records, 2009)
- Strictly Hardcore (Megarave Records, 2010)
- Demonic State (Megarave Records, 2011)
- Respect the Core (Megarave Records 2013)
- Destiny (Megarave Records, 2014)
- Nu Metalz (Megarave Records, 2014)
- Before Dawn (Megarave Records, 2015)
- We make you feel (Megarave Records, 2015)
- Release your anger (Megarave Records, 2016)
