= Joost van Bellen =

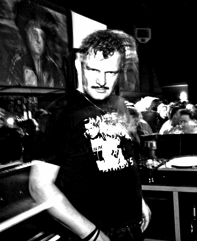

Background information
- Occupation: DJ
- Instrument: Turntables
- Years active: 1985-present
- Website: myspace.com/joostvanbellen

Joost van Bellen (born 4 January 1962, Leiden) is a Dutch electro DJ and event organizer. He is one of the longest playing and most influential DJs in The Netherlands and abroad. As resident DJ and artistic director of legendary club RoXY in Amsterdam (1991–1995), he was one of the Netherlands’ earliest proponents of house music. During the mid-eighties Joost van Bellen began running his own club nights of which OHAF, Fucque les Balles and Speedfreax are some of the most popular. He currently hosts the internationally celebrated Rauw (rhymes with “wow”, translation: raw), at Trouw Amsterdam, Tivoli in Utrecht, and Effenaar in Eindhoven. The night is known for pioneering new music, and has become the number one spot for artists including Erol Alkan, Boys Noize, Crookers, Headman, Larry Tee, Motor, Goose, Felix da Housecat, The Glimmers, Tommie Sunshine, Digitalism, Princess Superstar, and Soulwax.

== Other work ==
Van Bellen is also co-owner of events organization and creative branding agency Meubel Stukken, known for its extravagant parties.

Together with Richard Cameron (of Arling & Cameron), Van Bellen produces music under the name Cowgum. Following their hits “Filthy and Raw” and “Rollercoaster Rodeo”, the duo are currently working on an EP.

Joost van Bellen's latest endeavor, together with DJ Sanyi, is Star Studded Studios, which produces sound scores and provides musical direction for fashion shows, including Diesel (European shows and New York Fashion Week), Marlies Dekkers, Tommy Hilfiger, Elle Style Awards, Elle Prêt-à-Porter, Lancôme Design Awards, Daryl van Wouw, and Björn Borg. Star Studded Studios is currently also working with young Dutch designers.
