= Tommy Musto =

American record producer from New York

Tommy Musto (born c. 1963) is an American record producer from New York, who gained fame throughout the 1980s and 1990s in the dance music scene as a DJ and producer. In 1990, he collaborated with fellow New York DJ Frankie Bones as 'Musto and Bones', yielding the club hit "Dangerous on the Dance Floor". The two collaborated on many other side projects. In addition to working with early American techno and rave acts, he also produced remixes for mainstream artists such as Celine Dion, Gloria Estefan, and Michael Jackson.

He also works as an Investment Adviser at The Pinnacle Financial Group.

== Other sources ==
- Not OK, Computer, Ken Micallef, Remix;Emeryville, Vol. 5, Issue 1
- Ralphie Dee · Biography · Artist ⟋ RA
