= Neophyte (band) =

Dutch music group

- Origin: Schiedam, Netherlands
- Genres: Gabber
- Years active: 1992–present
- Labels: Neophyte Records
- Members: Jeroen Streunding; Danny Greten; Jarno Butter
- Past members: Robin van Roon
- Website: neophyte.nl

Neophyte is a Dutch hardcore, or gabber, group formed in 1992 in Rotterdam,Netherlands. The three original members are Jeroen Streunding (DJ Neophyte, The Beholder for hardstyle releases), Danny Greten and Robin van Roon.

== History ==
Jeroen Streunding was a DJ and organised smaller parties around 1990 before he met Danny Greten at a local party, when they decided to work on some tracks together. Robin van Roon also joined them after a while. Both Greten and van Roon were best friends, and classmates of Jeroens' younger sister. Having produced some tracks on an old Amiga Computer with Protracker, the three went to visit DJ Paul Elstak, who had just started his label Rotterdam Records where they hoped to be contracted. However, Elstak considered their tracks to be 'pure noise'. Several months and several try-outs later, Elstak suddenly liked their tracks and decided to release them on his label. As the years went by, Greten, Streunding and van Roon had more releases, and started performing on parties. In 1995, Robin van Roon left the group for his studies and Jarno Butter, a guitarist and good friend of Danny, was added for their live acts.

In 2005, Neophyte released a compilation album dedicated to their 13 years of existence titled 13 Jaar Terreur (English: 13 Years of Terror). It also contains tracks of the group released under different names such as "Bodylotion". Neophyte is also running a record label called Neophyte Records, currently hosting artists such as Tha Playah, DJ Panic and Evil Activities.

== Discography ==
=== Albums ===
- The Three Amiga's E.P. (Rotterdam Records, 1993)
- Protracker E.P. (Rotterdam Records, 1993)
- Noise Is The Message (Rotterdam Records, 1994)
- Execute (Rotterdam Records, 1996)
- Get This Motherfucker (Rotterdam Records, 1996)
- Real Hardcore (Rotterdam Records, 1997)
- Not Enough Middle Fingers (Neophyte Records, 2000)
- At War (Neophyte Records, 2001)
- Ten Years of Terror (Traxtorm Records, 2001)
- 13 Jaar Terreur (De Megamix) (Neophyte Records, 2005) Highest placement in the Dutch Album top 100: No. 29
- Bonkers 15 - Legends Of The Core Mix with Scott Brown (Resist Records), 2005
- Rechtoe, Rechtaan (Neophyte Records, (2006) Highest placement in the Dutch Album top 100: No. 69
- InvasionInvasion (Neophyte Records, 2007)
- Mainiak: Chapter 1 (Neophyte Records, 2011)
- Mainiak: Chapter 2 (Neophyte Records, 2013)

=== Selected singles ===
- "Mikey" (1993)
- "Mellow Moenie Mauwe" (1994) as Bodylotion
- "Make You Dance" (1994) as Bodylotion
- "Fuck Martina" (1994) as Bodylotion
- "Ik wil hakke!" (1994) as Bodylotion
- "Happy is voor Hobos" (1995) as Bodylotion
- "Get This Motherfucker" (1995) with The Stunned Guys
- "Execute" (1995)
- "Hardcore To Da Bone" (1996) as Masters of Ceremony
- "Always Hardcore" (1996) as Bodylotion
- "Braincracking" (1996)
- "Army of Hardcore" (1996) with The Stunned Guys
- "Hardcore To Da Bone - The Remixes" (1997) as Masters of Ceremony
- "Alles kapot" (2004) with Evil Activities
- "Skullfuck" (2004) as Masters of Ceremony
- "Je moet je muil houwen" (2005) with MC Ruffian
- "Back in My Brain Again" (2007)
- "Trasher" (2011) with Tha Playah
- "TD is You" (The Official Thunderdome Anthem) (2012) with Promo and Minckz
- "Coming At You Strong" (2013) with Tieum and Rob Gee
- "Fight With Anger" (2015) with Angerfist

=== DVDs ===
- 13 Jaar Terreur (2005)
- One Year on a Daft Planet - Neophyte World Tour (2007)
