= DJ Paul Elstak =

Dutch DJ and record producer (born 1966)

Paul Elstak
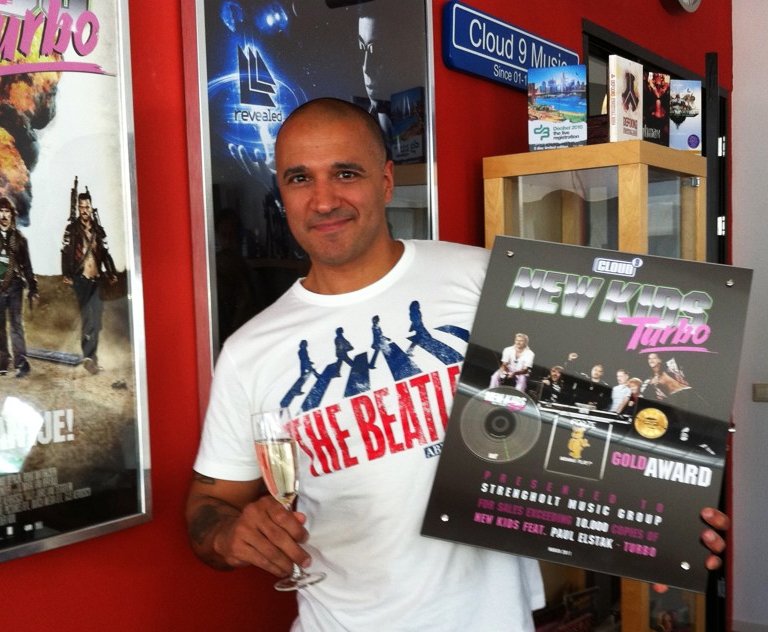
- Elstak in 2011

Background information
- Also known as: DJ Paul Elstak
- Born: Paul Roger Elstak; 14 January 1966 (age 60)
- Origin: The Hague, South Holland, Netherlands
- Genres: Hardcore; happy hardcore; gabber; mainstream hardcore
- Occupations: Producer, DJ
- Years active: 1987–present
- Formerly of: Rotterdam Terror Corps
- Website: djpaulelstak.nl

Paul Roger Elstak (known professionally as DJ Paul Elstak; born 14 January 1966 in The Hague) is a Dutch hardcore/gabber and happy hardcore DJ and record producer of Surinamese (Note: 1/4 Surinamese creole, 1/8th native Indonesian, 1/8th Chinese-Indonesian, 1/4th German, 1/4th Lithuanian. His father was half Afro-Surinamese, quarter native Indonesian, and quarter Chinese-Indonesian. His mother was half German half Lithuanian.) descent. He used to use his full name to create happy hardcore and DJ Paul for hardcore gabber, but when he started Offensive Records in 2001, he started using both names for gabber.

== Biography ==
Elstak co-wrote and co-produced the song "Europapa" by Dutch musician Joost Klein, which was released on 29 February 2024 and represented the Netherlands in the Eurovision Song Contest 2024.

== Discography ==
=== Singles ===
List of singles showing year released and album name
Title	Year	Album appaearance
"Rainbow in the Sky"	1995	May the Forze Be With You
"Luv U More"	1995	May the Forze Be With You
"The Promised Land"	1995	May the Forze Be With You
"Engeltje" (with Jebroer and Dr Phunk)	2017	Jebroer Presents Paranoia
"Flipside" (with Ransom and MC Boogshe)	2018	Non-album single
"XTCWTF" (with Reinier Zonneveld)	2024	Non-album single
"Luv U More" (Note: A remake of the 1997 track) (with Scooter and Joost Klein)	2025	Non-album single
