= The Deadfaced Dimension =

Studio album by Angerfist
- Released: November 14, 2014
- Recorded: 2012–2014
- Genre: Hardcore, gabber
- Length: 3:28:23
- Label: Masters of Hardcore
- Producer: Danny Masseling

Angerfist chronology
Retaliate (2011)	The Deadfaced Dimension (2014)	Raise & Revolt (2015)

The Deadfaced Dimension is the fourth studio album from Dutch hardcore producer and DJ Angerfist, released in November 2014 through Masters of Hardcore.

== Track listing ==
=== Disc 1 ===
No.	Title	Length
1.	"The Invasion (Intro)"	1:11
2.	"Strange Man In Mask"	4:59
3.	"The Deadfaced Dimension" (with MC Nolz)	5:12
4.	"Outta Control" (with Evil Activities & E-Life)	5:46
5.	"Knock Knock"	4:02
6.	"Bad Attitude"	4:56
7.	"Temple Of Disease (Tha Playah Remix)"	6:33
8.	"Santiago" (with Miss K8)	4:35
9.	"Shadowman" (with Decipher & Shinra)	4:36
10.	"Street Fighter"	5:35
11.	"Just Like Me" (with Tha Playah ft. MC Jeff)	5:20
12.	"Wake Up F**ked Up" (with Negative A)	4:52
13.	"Vato (Hardbouncer Edit)"	4:14
14.	"Messing With The Wrong Man"	5:23
Total length:		1:07:14

=== Disc 2 ===
No.	Title	Length
1.	"From The Blackness"	5:07
2.	"Necroslave (N-Vitral Remix)"	5:35
3.	"Don't F**k With Me"	5:30
4.	"Messenger Of God" (with Radical Redemption)	4:52
5.	"Relinquish" (with Lowroller)	5:16
6.	"Odious (State Of Emergency Remix)" (with Outblast)	4:20
7.	"Claim You" (with Dyprax)	4:37
8.	"Burn This MF Down"	5:01
9.	"Take U Back (Mad Dog Remix)"	5:05
10.	"Dirty Man" (with Tieum)	4:13
11.	"Get MF Raw" (with MC Jeff)	5:06
12.	"Bloodshed" (with Unexist ft. Satronica)	4:29
13.	"Fresh With The Gargle (Partyraiser Remix)" (with Crucifier)	4:46
14.	"The People Got A Choice" (with Drokz)	4:52
Total length:		1:08:49

=== Disc 3 ===
No.	Title	Length
1.	"Mindscape" (with Predator)	4:57
2.	"When You're Gone" (with Radical Redemption)	5:06
3.	"Carnival Of Doom" (as part of The Supreme Team)	6:13
4.	"The Desecrated"	6:16
5.	"New World Order" (with Miss K8)	5:18
6.	"Pagans" (with Lowroller)	5:06
7.	"Bring The Pain" (with Noize Suppressor)	5:01
8.	"Slice Em Up" (with Tieum ft. MC Nolz)	4:15
9.	"Immortal" (with Hellsystem)	4:32
10.	"Full Gentle Racket"	4:16
11.	"Reason To Hate" (with Radium)	5:30
12.	"Chaos & Evil (Andy The Core Remix)"	3:42
13.	"Inframan" (with Dr. Peacock)	6:25
14.	"Deathmask (Tripped Remix)" (with Drokz)	5:43
Total length:		1:12:20
