= Electric Love (disambiguation) =

Electric Love is an electronic dance music festival held in Austria annually since 2013.

Electric Love may also refer to:

- Electric Love (Dirty Vegas album), 2011
- Electric Love (Brother Wallace album), 2026
- "Electric Love" (song), by Børns, 2014
- Electric Love, a 1987 VHS by the Cult
