= Miss K8 =

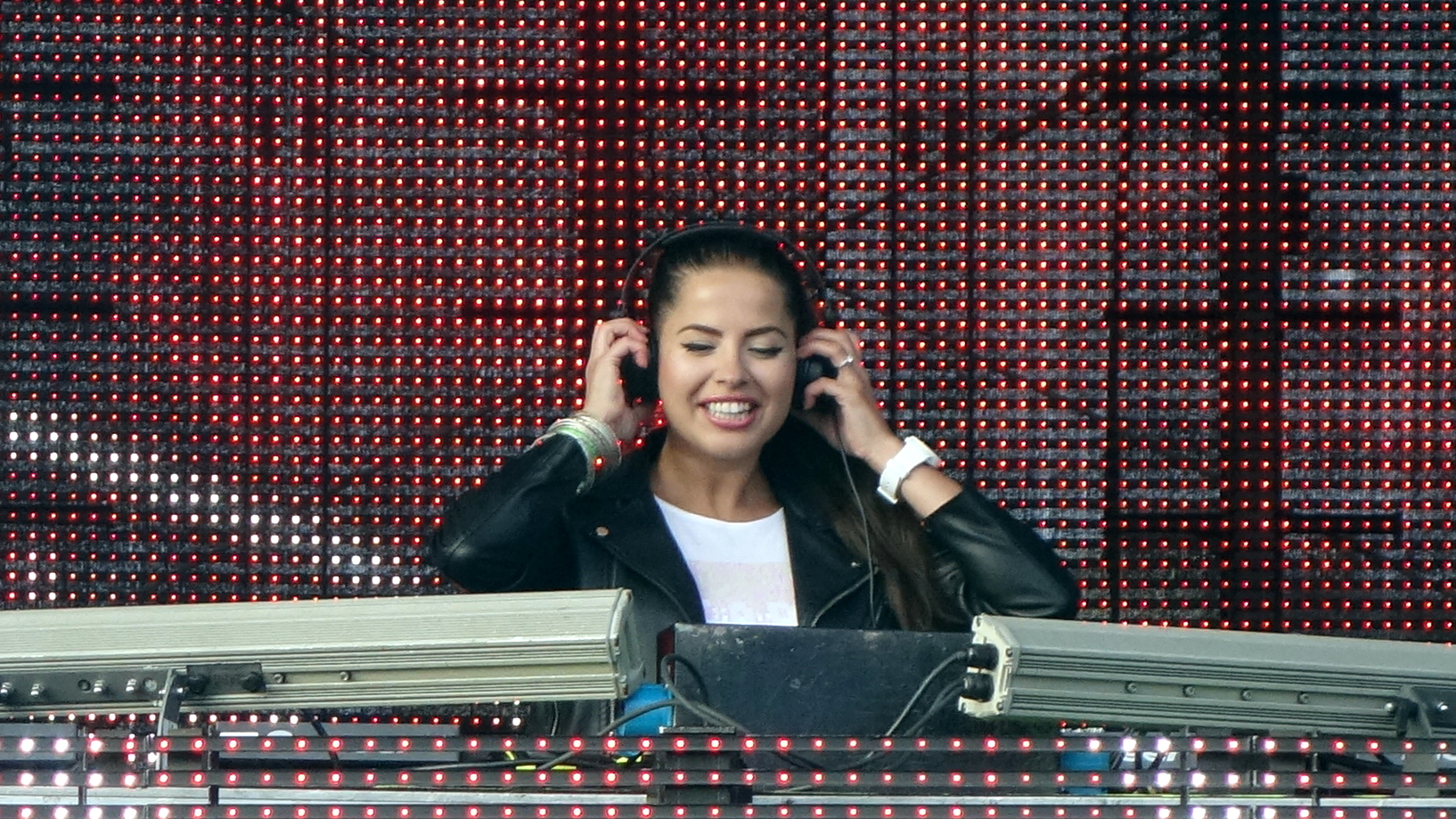
- Miss K8 at Summerburst in 2016

Background information
- Also known as: Lady Kate
- Born: Kateryna Kremko; Kyiv, Ukrainian SSR, Soviet Union (now Ukraine)
- Genres: Techno; hardstyle; hardcore techno; gabber; Frenchcore; Millennium Hardcore
- Occupation: DJ
- Years active: 2012–present
- Label: Masters of Hardcore
- Spouse: Angerfist
- Website: missk8.com

Kateryna Kremko (Ukrainian: Катерина Кремко), known professionally as Miss K8, is a Ukrainian hardcore DJ and producer. She has played at music festivals such as Defqon.1 and Masters of Hardcore, gaining recognition for her performances. In 2019, Kateryna took some time off due to pregnancy.

== Career ==
She released her debut single in 2012 titled "Unforgettable", which was released on the Masters of Hardcore record label. Her debut "Divide & Conquer" EP, which is a collaboration with Angerfist was released at the end of the year. In 2013, she released her Breathless EP. In 2015, Miss K8 debuted on the Top 100 DJs poll by DJ Mag at 94. In 2016 Miss K8 reached position 88 in the DJ Mag Top 100, in 2017 she climbed to #58, in 2018 she was awarded #65 and in 2019 she was voted #69.

Her debut studio album MAGNET was released on 26 March 2016 alongside the annual Masters of Hardcore event, held in the Brabanthallen in 's-Hertogenbosch, The Netherlands. At this edition of Masters of Hardcore, she was also responsible for the event's official anthem "Raiders of Rampage" featuring Nolz. In 2022, she released her brand new album: Eclipse.

She has performed at large Hardcore music festivals such as Masters of Hardcore, Dominator, SYNDICATE, Defqon.1, Decibel Outdoor Festival and more. Her track "Raiders of Rampage" featuring Nolz was ranked the #1 Hardcore track in the Masters of Hardcore Top 100 in 2016. And in 2018, she received the #1 award for her track "Out of the Frame" in the Masters of Hardcore Top 100.

== Discography ==
=== Studio albums ===
Title	Year
Magnet	2016
Eclipse	2022

=== Extended plays ===
Title	Year
Divide & Conquer (with Angerfist)	2012
Breathless	2013
The Poison	2015
Immortality (with Angerfist)	2020

=== Singles ===
Title	Year
"Unforgettable"	2012
"Metropolis of Massacre" (with Nolz)	2014
"New World Order" (with Angerfist)	2014
"Scream" (with Radical Redemption featuring Nolz)	2016
"St8ment"	2017
"Resolute Power" (featuring Nolz)	2017
"Temper"	2018
"Out of the Frame"	2018
"Up in Smoke"	2019
"The Poison (N-Vitral Remix)	2019
"Impact" (with Angerfist)	2019
"Get It Lit" (with Angerfist)	2019
"Elevate"	2019
"Battlefield (The SATAN Remix)	2019
