= Electric Love =

Electronic music festival held in Austria

Electric Love Festival
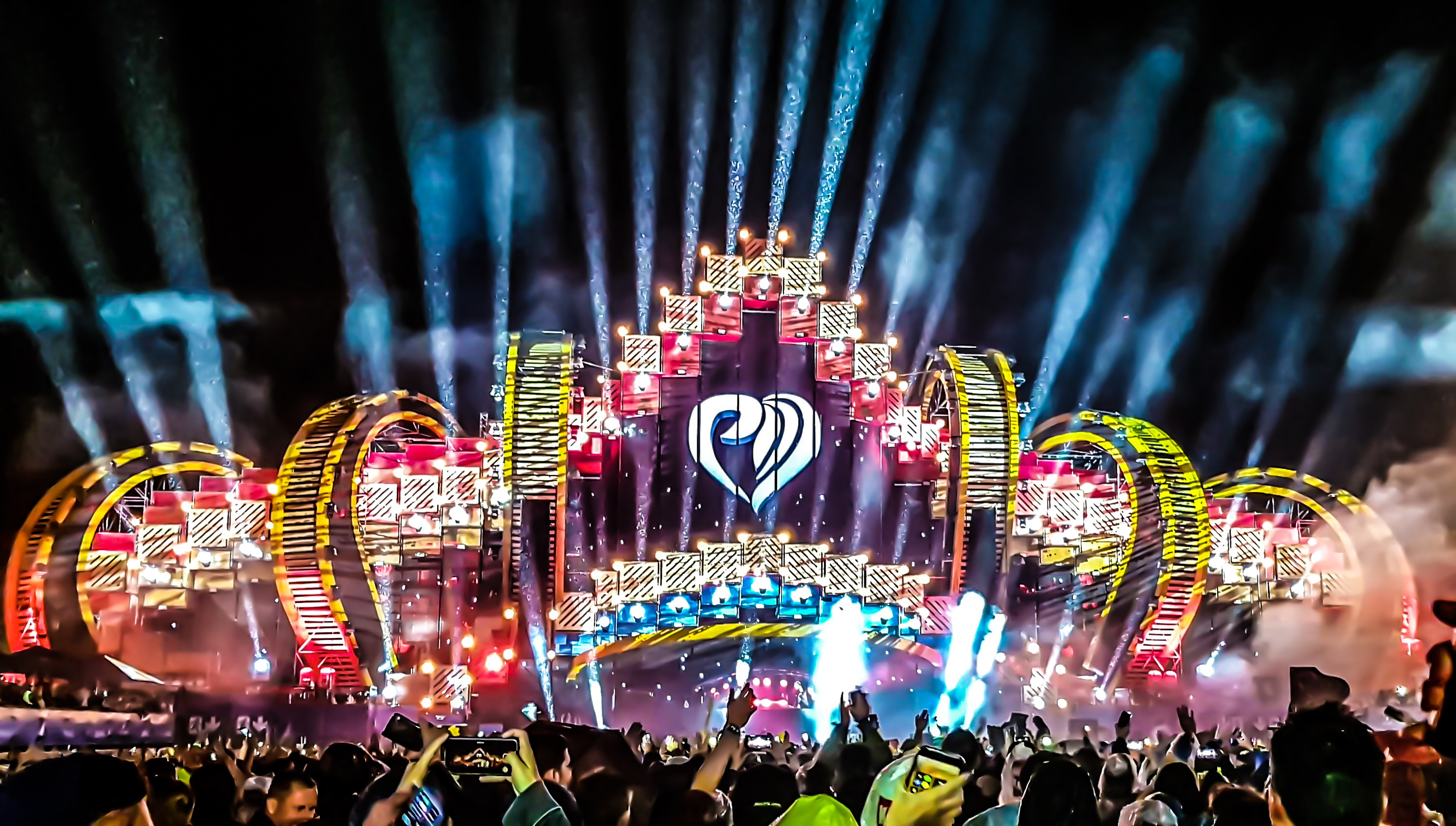
- Main stage in 2018
- Genre: Electronic dance music; hardstyle
- Dates: second weekend in July
- Locations: Salzburgring, Plainfeld, Austria
- Years active: 2013-present
- Attendance: 100,000+
- Website: Official website

Electric Love is an electronic dance music festival held annually since 2013. It takes place at the second weekend in July at the Salzburgring in Plainfeld, Austria. Headliners have included Armin van Buuren, Hardwell, Dimitri Vegas & Like Mike, David Guetta, Martin Garrix, Axwell, Sebastian Ingrosso, Tiësto. According to Technoton Magazin, the 2014 festival attracted over 100,000 attendees. It is operated by Revolution Event GmbH.

According to EMF Magazine, the festival is "Austria's leading electronic music festival".

== Concept ==
=== Location ===
The venue of Electric Love Festival is the Salzburgring, a race track opened in 1969 between Koppl and Plainfeld near Salzburg in the lake district of the Salzkammergut. Between 2001 and 2008, the Frequency Festival with 45,000 visitors per day according to the organizers already took place on the grounds. Surrounding cow meadows provided by farmers serve as camping areas.

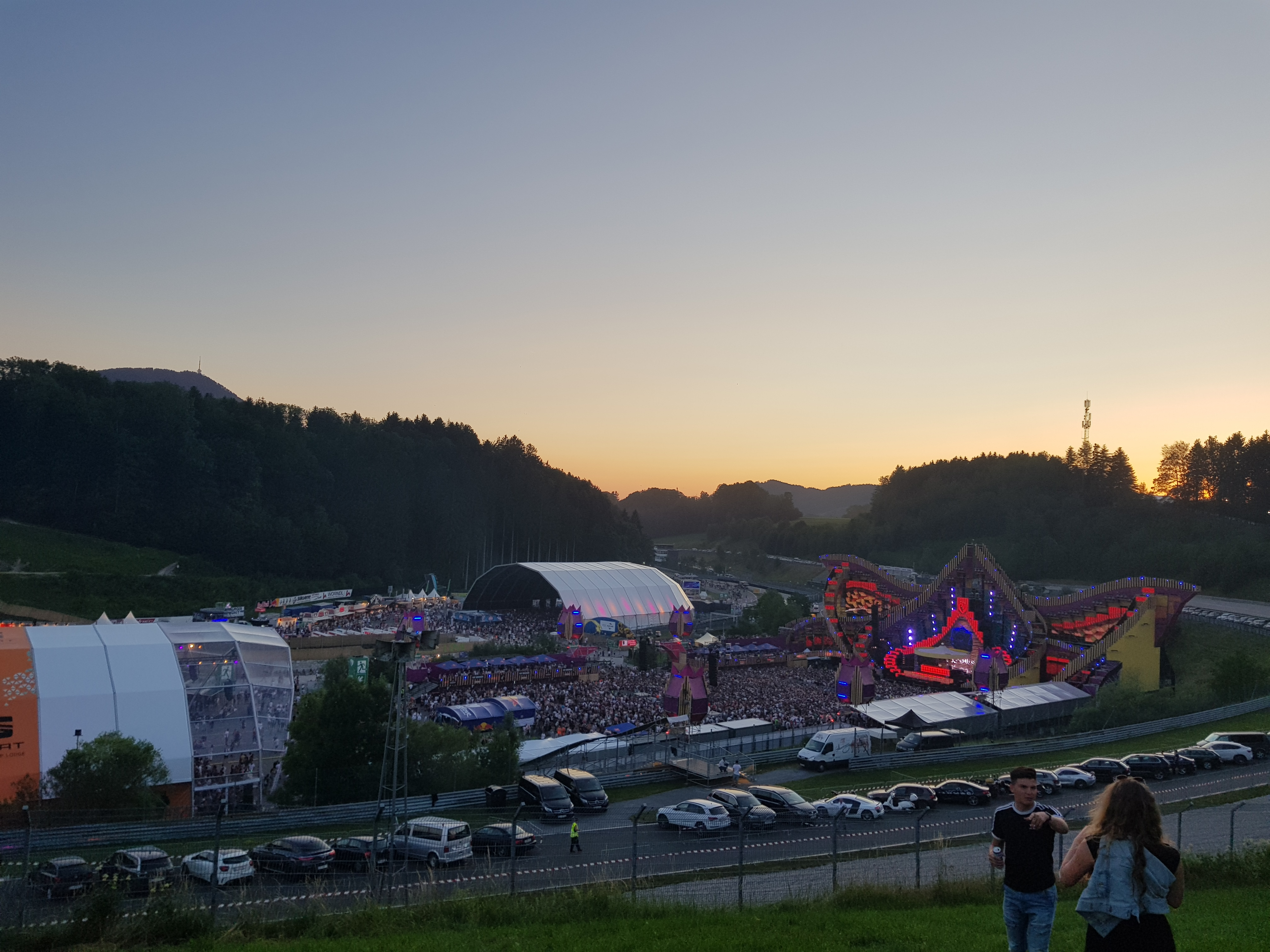
location overview

=== Stages ===
Mainstage: The main stage is located in the paddock of the race track.[10] Headliners from various EDM genres perform here.

Club Circus: This is the largest indoor stage. Since 2016, it has been hosted by the Dutch label Pussy Lounge on one day. In 2022, Blacklist, a series of events at Cologne based club Bootshaus, took over hosting the stage for one day for the first time. Also, the pre-party has been held here since 2015.

Harder Styles: The stage was hosted by Dutch label Q-Dance from 2015 to 2019. It is the second largest stage. Since 2022, the stage has been planned by the organizer itself and has since been called Hard Dance Factory.

Heineken Starclub: A club on the festival grounds where hip-hop and rap-artists perform.

Honeycomb: A techno stage which was used in 2019.

Shutdown Cave: In the "Shutdown Uptempo Cage - BPM Deluxe" the Harder Styles from 200 bpm are played. The name derives from the Shutdown Festival, a hardcore event in Zwentendorf.

Organics Beach: For the first time in 2022, an area on the beach of Fuschlsee opens before the festival. It is a separated event and offers activities such as yoga and creative sessions.

Almhütte: a traditional Austrian après-ski hut with two floors.

=== Opening ceremony ===
Traditionally, the festival is opened by Electric Love resident Felice, who is accompanied by a local choir and orchestra. In 2019, street performers from all over Europe were part of the show.

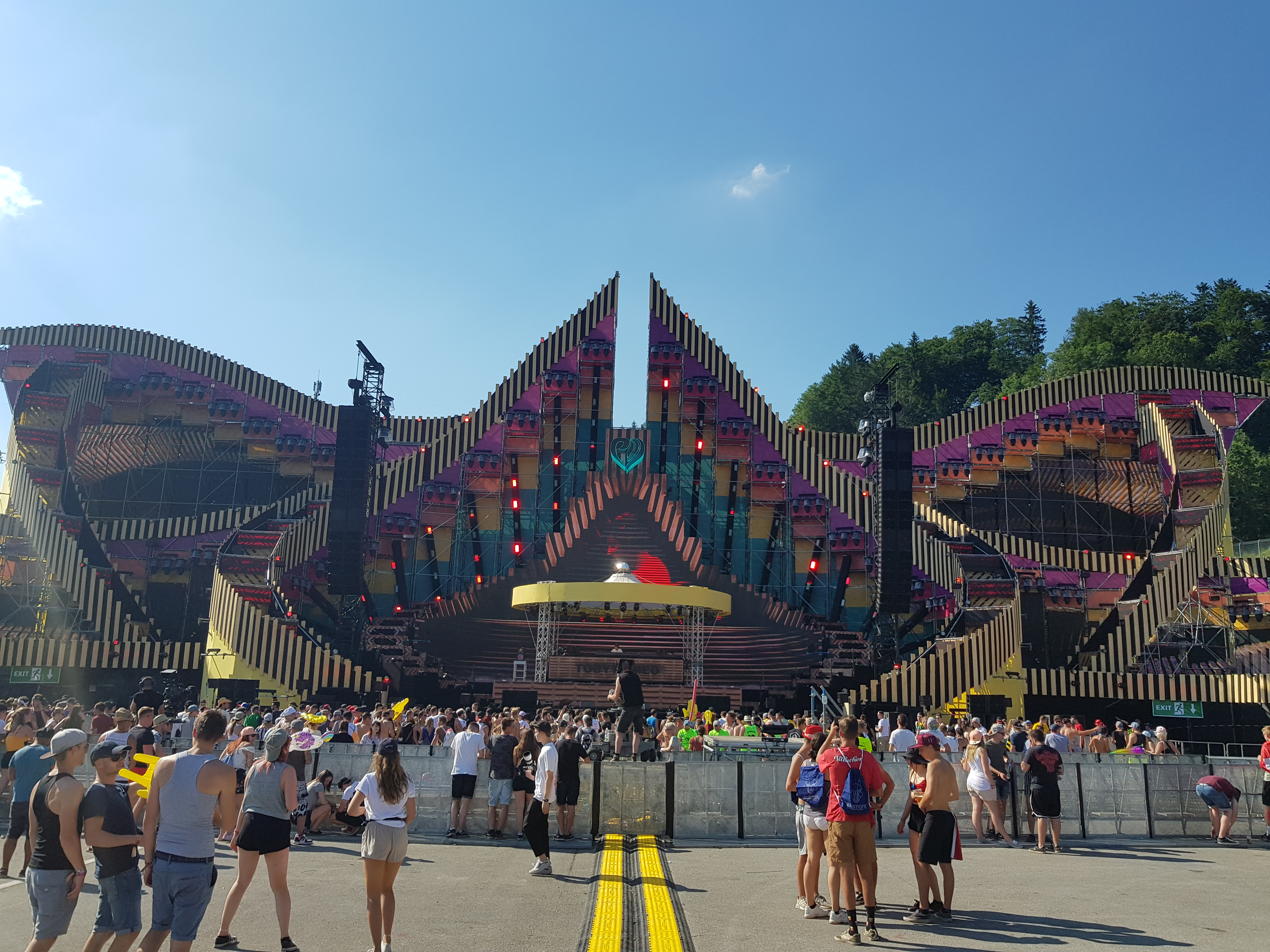
Mainstage 2019

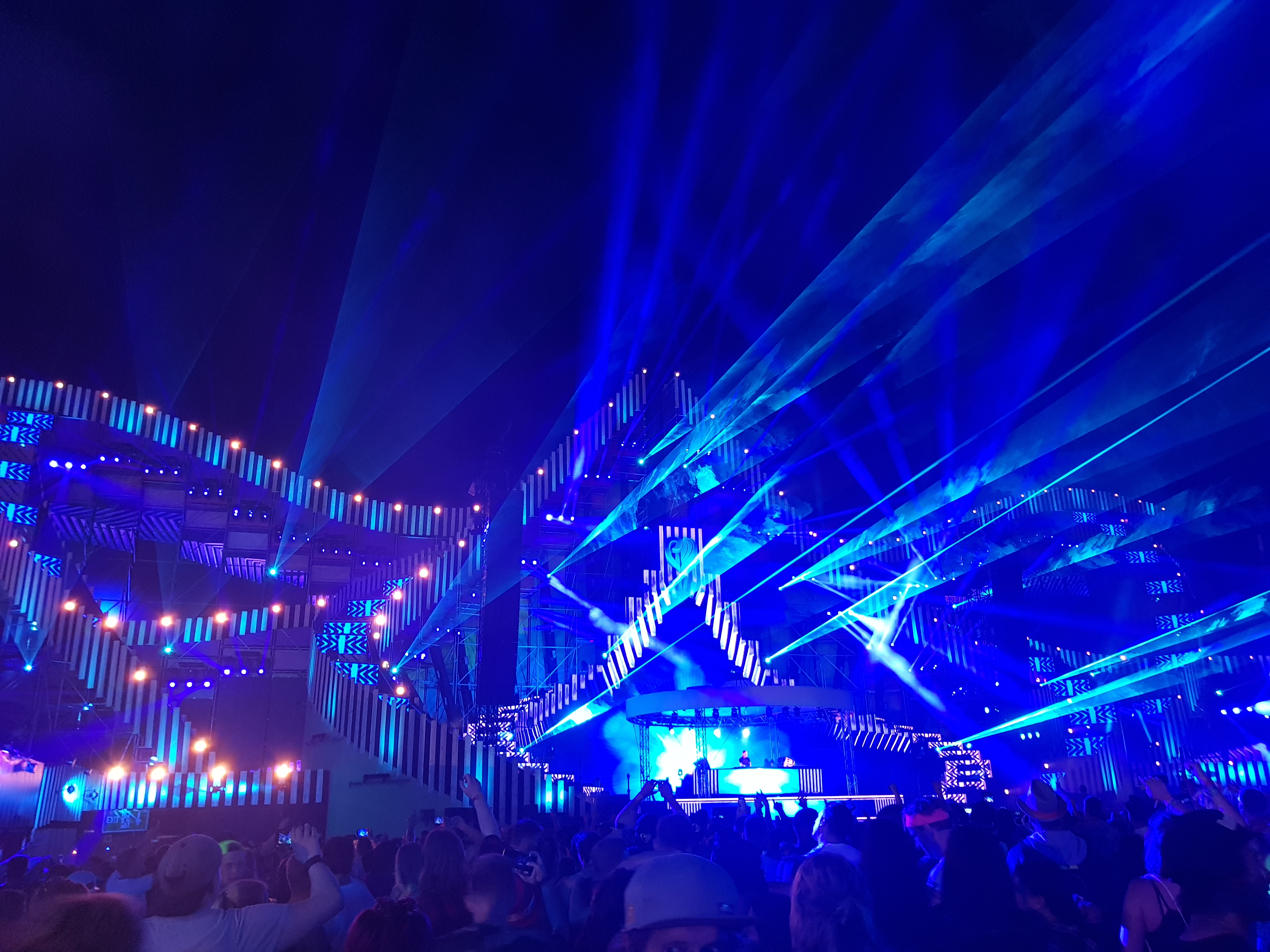
Tiësto performing at mainstage 2019

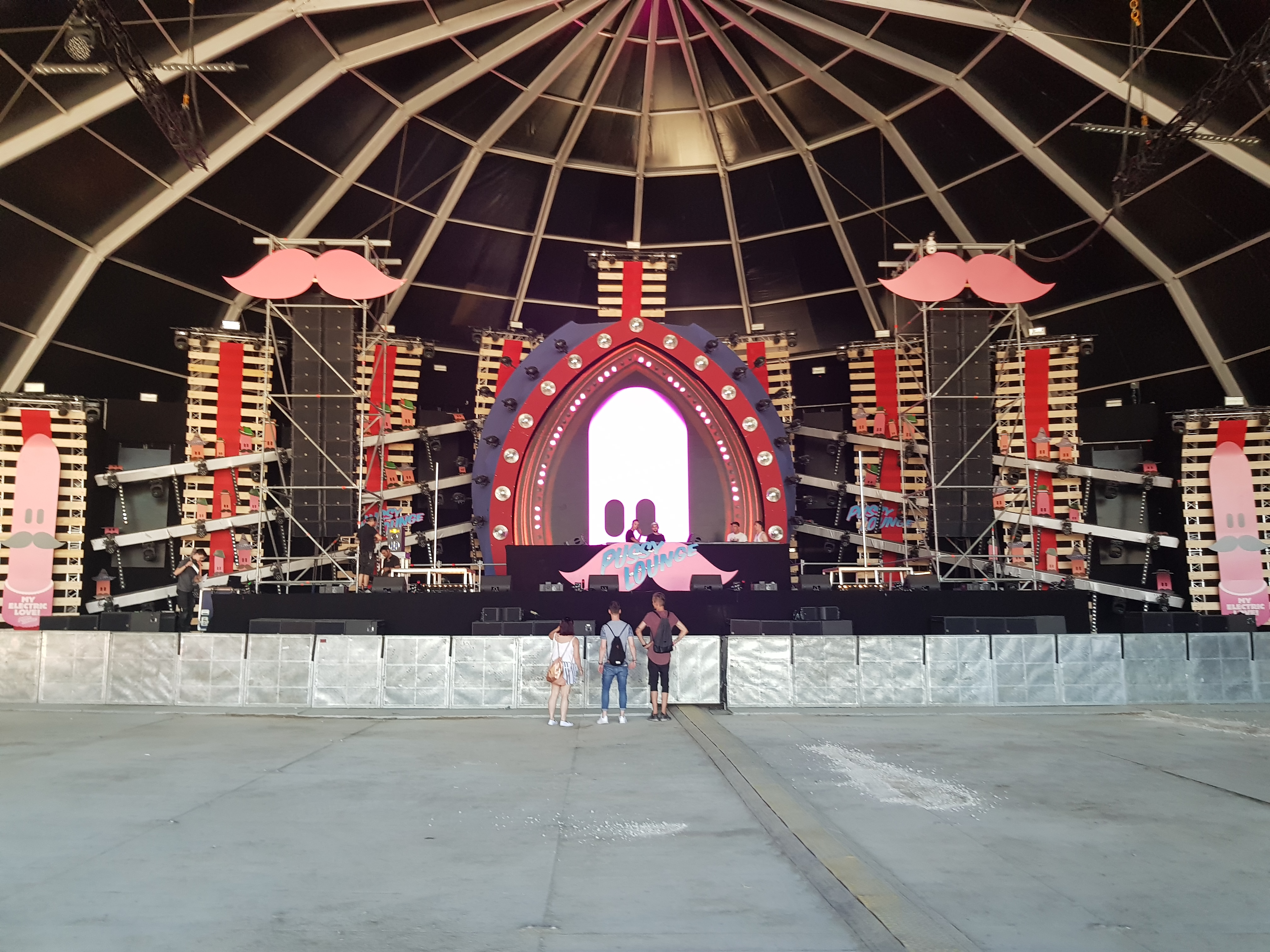
Club Circus Stage 2019

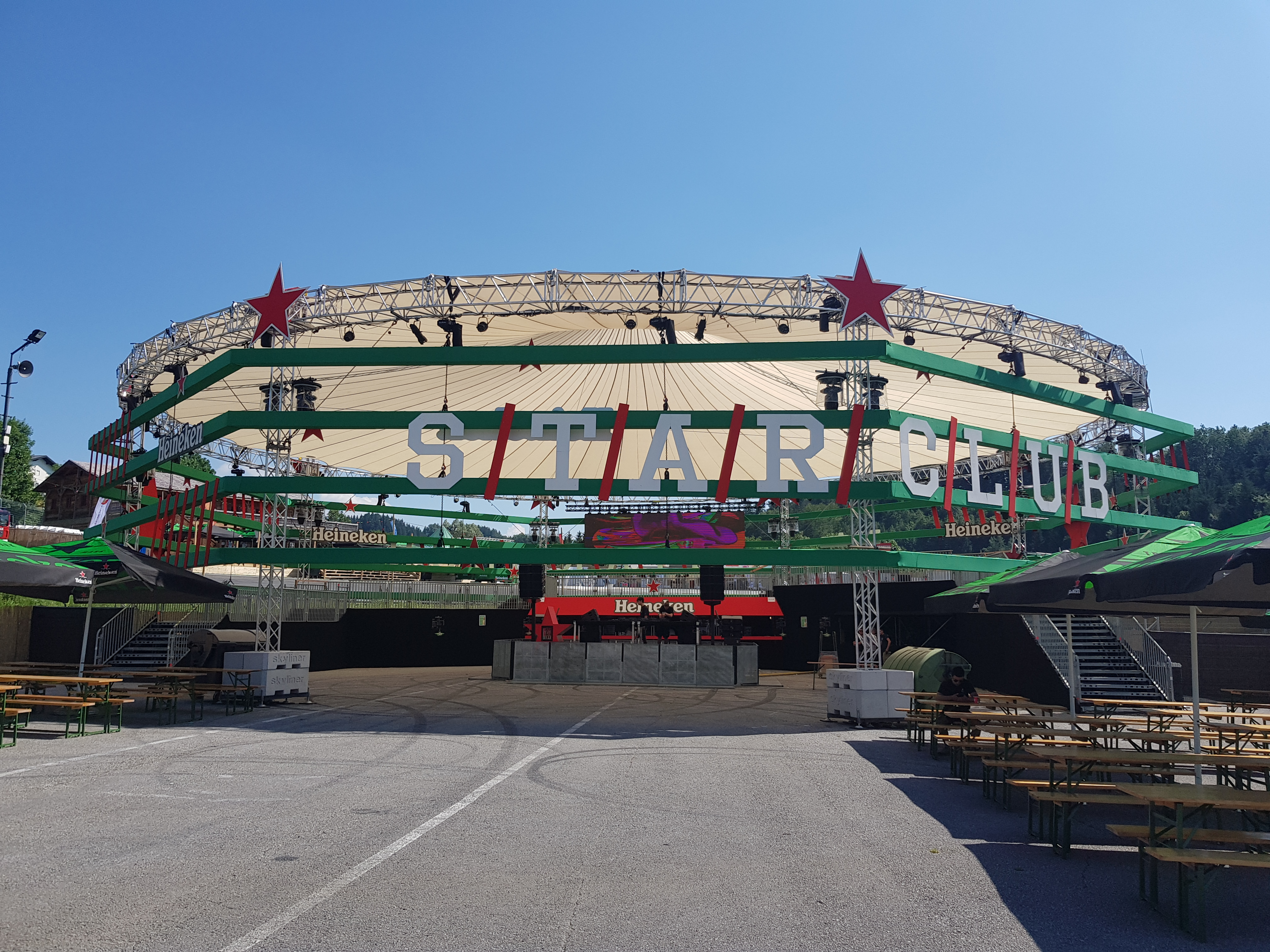
Heineken Starclub 2019

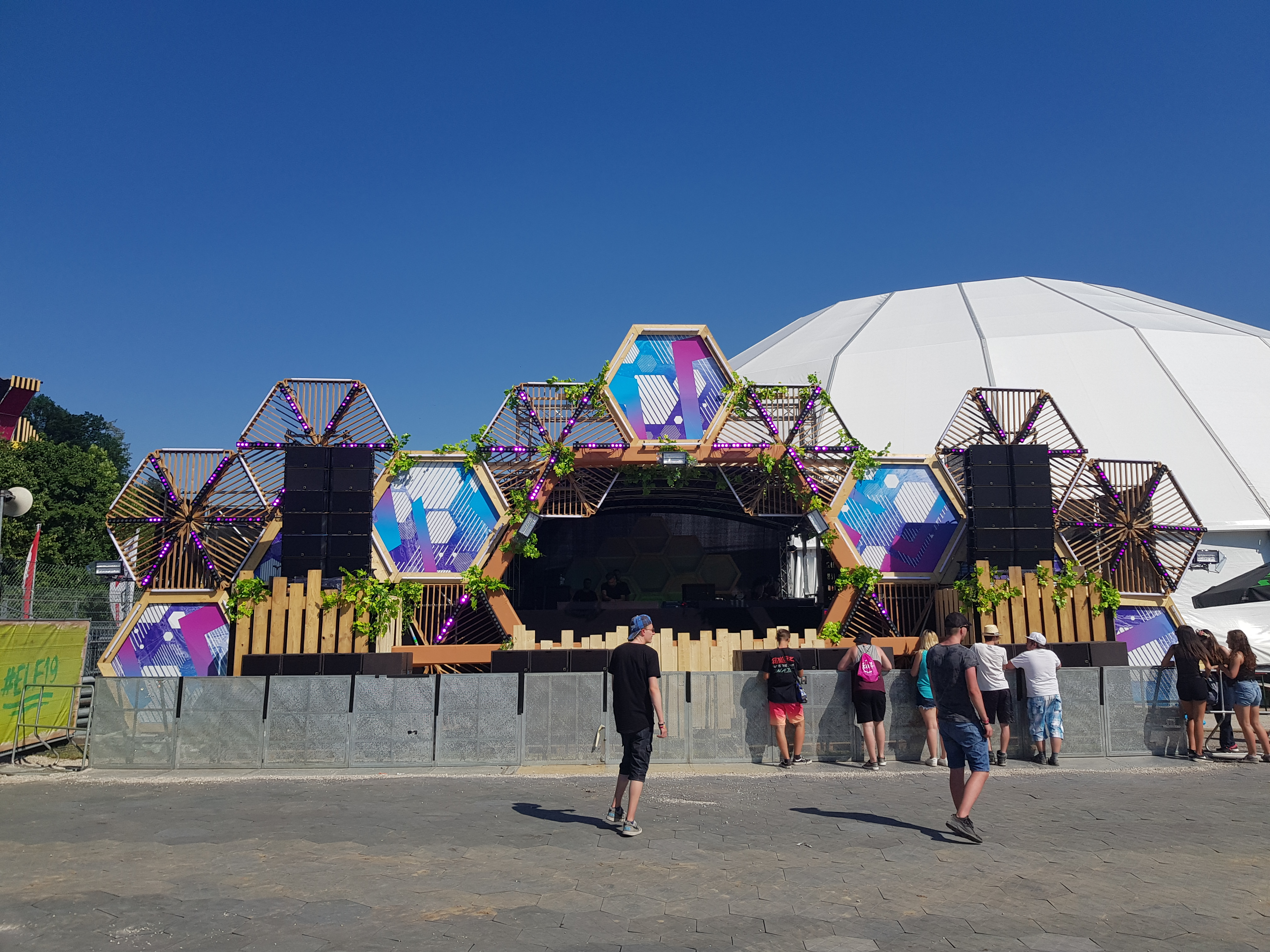
Honeycomb Techno Stage

== Summary ==
Date	Stages	Motto	Line-Up
Jul 12 – Jul 14, 2013	Main, Club Circus	#FeelTheLove	David Guetta, Steve Angello, Chuckie, Hardwell, Steve Aoki, Dimitri Vegas & Like Mike, Krewella, W&W, Nicky Romero, Nervo, Showtek, Dyro, Moonbootica, Joachim Garraud
Jul 10 – Jul 12, 2014	Main, Club Circus, HardBase.FM	#MakeItBig	Main: Afrojack, Armin van Buuren, Hardwell, Sebastian Ingrosso, Nicky Romero Club Circus: Flux Pavilion, Robin Schulz
Jul 09 – Jul 11, 2015	Main, Club Circus, Q-Dance, Heineken Starclub, Stonehenge	#TheNextStep	Main: Alesso, Armin van Buuren, Axwell Λ Ingrosso, Dimitri Vegas & Like Mike, Steve Aoki, Tiësto Club Circus: Deorro, R3hab
Jul 07 – Jul 09, 2016	Main, Club Circus, Q-Dance, Heineken Starclub	#CelebrateMusic	Main: Afrojack, Armin van Buuren, Axwell Ingrosso, ~~Deorro~~, ~~Hardwell~~, Jack Ü, Nicky Romero, The Chainsmokers Club Circus: Borgore, MAKJ, Zomboy, Camo & Krooked, Sigma, Nero, Subsurface, Chris Liebing, Sam Paganini
Jul 06 – Jul 08, 2017	Main, Club Circus, Q-Dance, Heineken Starclub, Almhütte	#FiveYearsTogether	Main: Alan Walker, Armin van Buuren, Carnage, Dash Berlin, Dirtcaps, DJ Snake, Hardwell, Krewella, Kryder, KSHMR, LNY TNZ, Marshmello, Martin Garrix, Shapov, Tchami, Timmy Trumpet, Yellow Claw, Zedd, Project One, Chuckie Club Circus: A-Trak, Chase & Status Dj Set, The Prophet, Dubfire, Flux Pavilion, Subsurface, Paul Elstak, Paul Kalkbrenner, Pendulum (DJ Set), Technoboy, Umek
Jul 05 – Jul 07, 2018	Main, Club Circus, Q-Dance, Heineken Starclub, Almhütte	#DiscoverYourStory	Main: The Chainsmokers, Deorro, Salvatore Ganacci, W&W, Marshmello, Armin van Buuren, Steve Aoki Club Circus: Dr Phunk, Paul Elstak, Kölsch, Felix Kröcher, San Holo, Subsurface
Jul 04 – Jul 06, 2019	Main, Club Circus, Q-Dance, Heineken Starclub, Almhütte, Honeycomb, Shutdown Uptempo Cage, Roller Disco	#FreshFruitsOldRoots	Main: Afrojack, ~~Axwell~~, Diplo, DJ Snake, Eric Prydz, Marshmello, Oliver Heldens, Tiësto, Timmy Trumpet, Arty, Chocolate Puma, Maurice West, Kill The Buzz, W&W, KSHMR, Tchami x Malaa, Slushii, Shippo Club Circus: Cesqeaux, Garmiani, Jauz, Netsky, Subsurface, Paul Elstak, NGHTMRE, Salvatore Ganacci, Snails Honeycomb: Felix Kröcher, Klaudia Gawlas, Pan-Pot, Sven Väth, Umek
~~Jul 09 – Jul 11, 2020~~ (cancelled)	Main, Club Circus, Q-Dance, Heineken Starclub, Honeycomb, Shutdown Cage	#ColorfulPlayground	Main: Armin van Buuren, Kygo, Don Diablo, KSHMR, Gigi D’Agostino, Alan Walker, Paul Kalkbrenner, Robin Schulz, Timmy Trumpet Club Circus: Fisher
~~Jul 08 – Jul 10, 2021~~ (postponed)	Main, Club Circus, Q-Dance, Heineken Starclub, Honeycomb, Shutdown Cage	#EditionOne	
Aug 26 – Aug 28, 2021	Main, Harder Styles, Heineken Starclub	#Boutique	Main: Afrojack, Armin van Buuren, Tungevaag, Martin Garrix, W&W, Toby Romeo Harder Styles: Brennan Heart, Headhunterz, Paul Elstak, Aftershock, Da Tweekaz, Ran-D, Sefa, Sub Zero Project, Warface, Wildstylez Heineken Starclub: Kasimir1441, Jamule
Jul 07 – Jul 09, 2022	Main, Club Circus, Harder Styles, Heineken Starclub, Shutdown Cage, Organics Beach	#ColorfulPlayground	Mainstage: Armin van Buuren, Don Diablo, Kygo, Timmy Trumpet, Toby Romeo, Dimitri Vegas & Like Mike, Fedde Le Grand, Gigi D’Agostino, Kygo, Paul Kalkbrenner, Steve Aoki, Yellow Claw Club Circus: Fisher, Solardo, Charlotte de Witte, Kayzo, Krewella, Luude Harder Styles: Headhunterz, Brennan Heart, Aftershock, Coone, D-Block & S-te-Fan, Da Tweekaz, Devin Wild Heineken Starclub: Finch
Jul 06 – Jul 08, 2023	Main, Club Circus, Hard Dance Factory, Heineken Starclub, Shutdown Stage	#10x11	Mainstage: James Hype, Hardwell, Timmy Trumpet, Toby Romeo, Charlotte de Witte, Scooter, Maddix Club Circus: Luude Hard Dance Factory: Headhunterz, Miss K8, Angerfist, Dr. Peacock
Jul 04 – Jul 06, 2024	Main, Club Circus, Hard Dance Valley, Heineken Starclub, Shutdown Stage, BlueBoXX	#ColorfulPlayground	
Jul 03 – Jul 05, 2025	Main, Club Circus, Hard Dance Valley, Heineken Starclub, Shutdown Stage, BlueBoXX, Almhütte	#LoveResonates	
Jul 09 – Jul 11, 2026	Main, Club Circus, Hard Dance Valley, Heineken Starclub, Shutdown Stage, BlueBoXX, Almhütte	#LoveResonates	

Due to COVID-19 pandemic the festival got cancelled in 2020 and postponed in 2021 to Aug 26 – Aug 28, 2021 with a special concept of only 10.000 Festival attendees per day.

=== Awards ===
- Live-Entertainment-Award (LEA)
  - 2018: nominated in category "festival of the year"
- European Festival Awards
  - 2013: nominated in category "Best new festival" and "Best medium sized festival"
  - 2015: nominated in category "Best Major Festival"
  - 2019: nominated in category "Best Major Festival"
- Austrian Event Award
  - 2020: Awarded in Gold nominated in category "event security"

== See also ==
- List of electronic music festivals
