= Get Together =

Get Together may refer to:

- "Get Together" or "Let's Get Together", a 1963 song written and recorded by Chet Powers (as Dino Valenti), and then by the Kingston Trio, the Youngbloods and others
- "Get Together" (Madonna song), 2005
- "Get Together", by Solange Knowles from the album Solo Star, 2002
- The Sims 4: Get Together, an expansion pack for the video game The Sims 4
- The Get Together, a 2020 American comedy film

== See also ==
- Get Together with Andy Williams, an album by Andy Williams
- Getting Together, a 1971–72 American musical sitcom
- Let's Get Together (disambiguation)
- Get It Together (disambiguation)
