= DJ Korsakoff =

Dutch disc jockey and producer (born 1983)

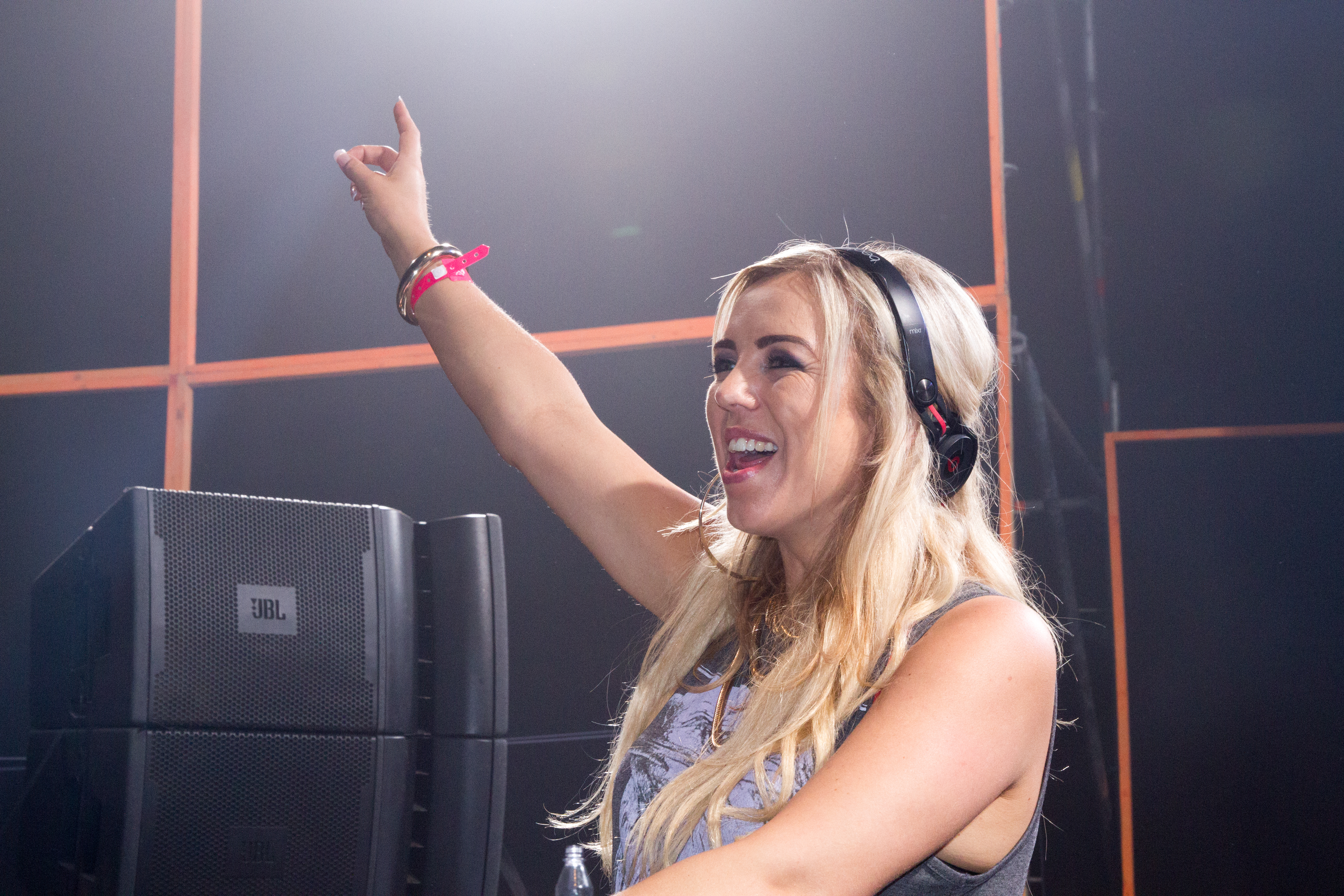
- DJ Korsakoff in 2015
- Born: Lindsay van der Eng; July 25, 1983 (age 43); Akersloot, Amsterdam, Netherlands
- Occupations: Disc jockey; producer
- Years active: 2001–present
- Musical career
- Genres: Techno hardcore; gabber

Lindsay van der Eng (born July 25, 1983), known professionally as DJ Korsakoff, is a Dutch disc jockey and producer of hardcore techno and gabber. She is one of the most recognized producers of the gabber scene mixing in the most prestigious events, in particular Masters of Hardcore.

== Biography ==
Lindsay van der Eng was born on July 25, 1983, in a small village in Akersloot, Amsterdam, Netherlands. She came into the scene riding on productions from Bart Kok (aka Catscan) who had released "Separated World" and other melodic hardcore tracks under a different name as to not confuse the public. When he defected from the label The Third Movement to Masters of Hardcore under the push of Outblast (Marc Out) he was pressured into releasing the name DJ Korsakoff so they could make a separate act from the name and cash in on it. This is where they auditioned Lindsay, who was an escort Mark was dating at the time and he started putting her on MOH line-ups to introduce her and taught her how to mix. In 2005, she participated in the album 3XHARD3R, the album presents the various trends derived from hardcore techno: a jumpstyle mix of DJ Ruthless and a hardstyle mix of DJ The Prophet, and a mix "powerrave" by Korsakof. In 2008, she mixed one of the CDs from the triple album Bassleader 2008.

Her album Pink Noise released on May 21, 2010, reached 83rd place in the Dutch music charts for one week, the album is also well received on Partyflock with a score of 80 out of 100 with the verdict: "The surprising Pink Noise is a very solid album... with good songs and a reasonable variety of styles". On December 7, 2012, her album Stiletto reached 160th place in the Belgian music charts for a week, and it was also well received on Partyflock with a rating of 73 out of 100. She participates in electronic music festivals and events all over Europe, such as the Svojšice Festival in the Czech Republic in 2014. On March 3, 2014, she participated in an evening called A Night with Bass-D, organized with Bass-D. In 2015, she participated in the Summer Festival.

== Discography ==
=== Albums ===
- Stiletto (2012)

=== Singles ===
- "Separated World" (2001)
- "Tamara" (2002)
- "Catscan – Time 2B loud" (2003)
- "My Empty Bottle" (2003)
- "Stardom" (2004)
- "Powerrave" (2004)
- "Unleash the beast" (2004)
- "Loose Control" (2005)
- "-L=C2" (2005)
- "Audioholic" (2005)
- "No Noctophobia" (2005)
- "Pendeho" (2005)
- "Alpha" (2005)
- "Backfire" (2005)
- "Still Wasted" (2005)
- "Tokyodome Experience" (2006)
- "Face to Face" (2007)
- "Never Surrender" (2007)
- "Unrivalled" (2008)
- "Focus" (2008)
- "Master Symphonie" (2008)
- "Daydream" (2009)
- "Voices" (2009)
- "Surround Me" (2009)
- "Pink Noise" (2010)
- "Lyra" (2014)
- "37,5%" (2014)
- "Wasted World" (2014)
- "Hurt" (2015)
- "One" (2015)
- "Temptation" (2015)
- "Skream" (2015)
- "Somnia" (2016)
- "A New Dawn" (2016)
- "This Feeling" (2023) (with Ricardo Moreno)
- "Fighter" (2024)
