= Radical Redemption =

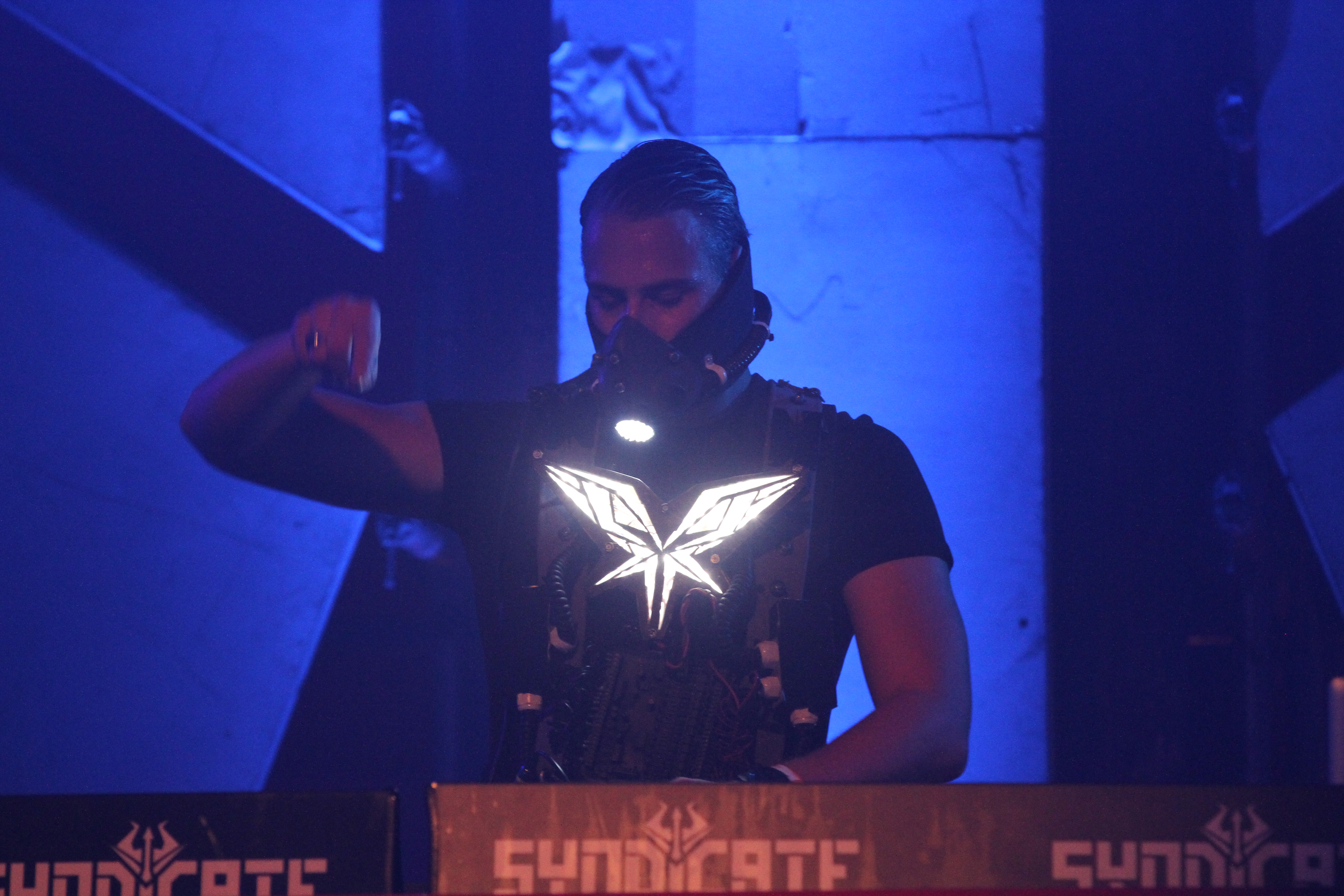
- Radical Redemption performing at Syndicate in 2013

Background information
- Born: Joey van Ingen; 17 September 1990 (age 36)
- Origin: Denekamp, Netherlands
- Genres: Rawstyle; Hardstyle; Hardcore
- Occupations: DJ; Producer
- Years active: 2011-present
- Labels: Minus is More; Redemption Records
- Member of: Minus Militia; Marshals of Mayhem
- Website: https://www.radicalredemption.nl/

Joey van Ingen (born 17 September 1990, Denekamp), known professionally as Radical Redemption, is a Dutch hardstyle DJ and record producer. He is most known for producing rawstyle, a darker subgenre of Hardstyle.

He has released eight studio albums as a solo artist, and another three as part of supergroup Minus Militia. He is also popular within the scene for his Brutal saga, and his Orchestra of Eternity, the latter of which is set to become an album at some time during 2026. He is currently part of the rawstyle trio "Marshals of Mayhem".

Due to a prolonged legal battle, Radical Redemption left his old record label and booking agent in 2022, and started his own record label, Redemption Records in 2023. The matter was settled out of court in early 2025.

He has played at several festivals such as Defqon.1, Dominator and Loudness. His most notable performances have been at Intents and Supremacy. He has collaborated with many others artists in the hard dance scene, including but not limited to Angerfist, Showtek, D-Sturb, Maddix, D-Block & S-Te-Fan, Crypsis and Noisecontrollers.

== Personal life ==
As a child, Joey van Ingen was always interested in music. He is the son of Marga Bult (who represented the Netherlands in Eurovision 1987), and Jan van Ingen, who was an event manager and booking agent. When he was 10, he started drumming, then in high school, he played in various bands, including Stille, which became his most important project. A YouTube channel still exists with uploads from a teenage van Ingen playing rock songs on the drums.

van Ingen grew up in Denekamp, and began to listen to hardcore throughout his teenage years. He maintains that his introduction to hard dance music was via hardcore, not originally hardstyle, which was the less popular genre at the time. His favourite hardcore artist while growing up was Angerfist, who also originated from the same village. He later became more interested in hardstyle, until the genre shifted to more melodic sounds.

Unlike his mother, van Ingen has no children of his own, a decision he made witnessing his own mother's career in music and TV presenting as a child. He still lives in Twente, the same region from which he grew up. He believes that living in the countryside where he grew up helps him stay grounded, reminds him of his roots, and allows him to remain connected to a community which has fostered plenty of hard dance talent. He is sometimes referred to as "Farmer Joey" by those in the scene, because of his rural upbringing. Along with his hometown, van Ingen has talked frequently about the importance of his parents influence and conveying their importance to his personal life and career. His focus on music and his career changed when his father was diagnosed with cancer in the late 2010s, before passing away after unsuccessful rounds of chemotherapy in 2021.

== Career ==
=== Career Origins ===
Radical Redemption mainly produces rawstyle, a popular sub-genre of hardstyle, as well as associated hard dance genre hardcore. Prior to producing music, he was a club DJ in Lattrop, the same town where his mother first gained attention as a church singer. The name "Radical Redemption" came from a brainstorming session between him and his mother one night, since he needed an artist name as one of his tracks was going to be played live by fellow tukker Crypsis. He credits his early success to Crypsis, who assisted him in song production at the very start of his career. Both living in Denekamp at the time, Radical Redemption claims the pair would cycle between each others' houses to work on hardstyle and hardcore songs together.

=== Events & Performances ===
Throughout his career, Radical Redemption has been well known in the scene for hosting parties. Throughout the latter half of the 2010s, he hosted a series of events, the first pair at the Heineken Music Hall, and the latter three at "The Radical Dome", a self named venue in Breda:

- 2015: The One Man Army (album event)
- 2016: Militant Mayhem
- 2017: The Road to Redemption (album event)
- 2018: Command and Conquer (album event)
- 2019: Brotherhood of Brutality

His events typically featured performances from fellow Minus is More record mates, and sometimes included the rare appearance of "Denekamps Gespuis", a short lived hard-dance supergroup containing artists from Denekamp (Angerfist, Crypsis, Dyprax and Radical Redemption).

He has played at several well known events in the hardstyle scene, including Defqon.1 and Decibel Outdoor. His performances at Intents Festival and Supremacy specifically have led many to associate these event with his darker, raw brand of hardstyle. Radical Redemption himself believes that Supremacy has been the home to many iconic moments of his own career, and he has produced three anthems for the event (one as Minus Militia in 2014, one for the Australian edition in 2018, and one in 2022).

To celebrate 15 years producing and releasing music, Radical Redemption announced an anniversary show to be performed at the end of 2026. He thanked his fans, who helped him through various struggles, including the Covid lockdowns, the death of his father and the legal battle which ensued with his former agent. He admits there were many times where he thought he would retire from music production, and dedicated the anniversary event to his fans who stood by him throughout his career. The event, titled RESURREXION, is planned to take place in November 2026 in Utrecht.

=== DJ Mag Top 100 ===
In 2014, Radical Redemption entered the DJMag Top 100 DJs for the first time, polling at number 64. Throughout the mid-2010s, he continued to be voted in the 60s-70s, peaking at No. 44 in 2017. After a decline in popularity following his peak, Radical Redemption opted out of the list in 2019 due to complications with his father's health. He rejoined the list to make his final appearance in 2020, where he appeared at No. 80.

A selfie taken by Radical Redemption on the author's phone.

== Albums ==
=== Foundational Albums (2012-15) ===
In the early years of his career, Radical Redemption released three albums: Annihilate (2012), The Spell of Sin (2013) and The One Man Army (2015). The Spell of Sin, his second studio album, contained 28 tracks, with the tracklist transitioning from raw hardstyle into hardcore. This album also included his first collaboration with Angerfist, his teenage idol. The One Man Army has been described as monumental and a masterpiece, forging Radical Redemptions reputation with its military aesthetic and hard, heavy kickdrums. The album contained 45 tracks in total, including 11 hardcore tracks which raise the BPM, and remixes from other popular artists within the scene. The eponymous event, held at the Heiniken Music Hall, was described by those within the scene as one of the best hardstyle events of 2015.

=== Middle Albums (2017-20) ===
The Road to Redemption was released in 2017, and would mark his third consecutive year hosting his own event. While the event featured several recurring guests, artists such as Act of Rage, D-Sturb, Warface and Regain also featured on the lineup. The event was also moved to Breepark in Breda, with a higher capacity than Heiniken Music Hall, following consecutive years of sold out events. 2017 also saw one of the first occasions where Radical Redemption would work with a live orchestra, whom produced the anthem for The Road to Redemption event.

A year later, he would return to Breepark to present his next album and event: Command and Conquer. This marked the fifth solo album he had worked on in six years, not including the two albums he had worked on with Minus Militia. Upon reflection in 2020, Radical Redemption mentions that his fifth solo album was not his favourite, and that some of the tracks feel quite forced.

2020 also saw his final full release at long-time label Minus is More, dropping The Chronicles of Chaos at the end of the year. The album contained 19 tracks, including "D.A.D", a tribute to his father after the unsuccessful conclusion of his chemotherapy, and "Brutal 6.0 (Radical Redemption Remix)", which was the first track from the Brutal saga to have an officially released remix. He claims that this album was initially kept a secret from everyone, including the public, his booking agent and his record label. He explained that this was to reduce the mental burden and external pressure of needing to conform to deadlines, deciding instead to drop the album when he felt it was ready.

=== No Retaliation Series (2023-present) ===
In October 2023, following over three years without any full length releases, Radical Redemption announced at his Orchestra of Eternity event that he would be releasing three albums in a series named No Retaliation. No Retaliation was the first project to be released following the death of his father, and his ongoing legal troubles following his exit from Most Wanted Agency. The theme strikes a personal chord, providing the vehicle for Radical Redemption to emotionally process everything he had experienced over the past few years, and inspired him to become a stronger and better artist during challenging times.

No Retaliation was broken up into three albums: No Retaliation Pt 1: The Solos, No Retaliation Pt 2: The Collaborations, and No Retaliation Pt 3: The Orchestra of Eternity. The three disc cases were designed with the letters "D", "A", and "D" in the background, a final dedication to his father who had supported him throughout much of his career. When originally announced, Radical Redemption claimed that all three albums would be released in 2024. As of 2026, only Parts 1 & 2 have been released. He has replied to fans' questions about the incomplete trilogy on Reddit, explaining that there have been some issues with clearing samples, and that the final part is still slated for a release. The No Retaliation project has seen a number of live performances, with a European club tour taking place in 2025.

== Musical Projects ==
=== Brutal Saga ===
The Brutal saga is one of the longest ongoing sagas of songs by any hard dance artist. Radical Redemption described Brutal as a saga he started to be more experimental with his sounds, vocals, kicks and arrangement. He has explained that he doesn't start consciously working on a Brutal track, but rather waits until something comes along which strikes him as deserving of a place in the saga.

Radical Redemption playing in Sydney in October 2026.

As of 2026, the saga features 12 songs, starting with "Brutal 1.0" created sometime in 2011, and continuing to "Brutal 12.0" released in late 2025. The only song which breaks this naming convention is "Brutal X", instead containing the roman numeral for the 10th song in the series. "Brutal X" is also notable as it combines elements from the previous nine tracks. It was also the very first song to be released on Redemption Records, Radical Redemption's own record label which he started in 2023.

Aside from a limited edition 12" vinyl with the first 10 Brutal tracks, released in commemoration of "Brutal X", there has been no official release of "Brutal 1.0". The track has only ever been performed on one occasion, at The One Man Army album show. The other 11 Brutal tracks have been released officially, either as singles, or as tracks within albums.

=== Orchestra of Eternity ===
Radical Redemption & his Orchestra of Eternity was a live performance which he started working on throughout the Covid lockdown, and was designed to be a different experience to his regular high energy, highly danceable DJ sets. It was also the final collaborative project he conceived with his father before his father's passing. He has always maintained an interest in orchestral music and movie soundtracks, with his favourites being Hans Zimmer, John Williams, Hauschka and Alan Menken.

The performance brings together an orchestra of 25 musicians, special effects, and pyrotechnics, to create a unique combination of hard dance and classical music. It was originally debuted at Intents Festival in 2022, before being put on hold and recommencing at Freshtival in 2023. There was also a small number of standalone events, including one at Het Sierraad, where the performance took centre stage. The performance became a key point of contention in Radical Redemption's relationship with his former booking agent, Most Wanted Agency, kicking off a series of legal battles in 2022.

== Legal Issues ==
=== Background ===
In the 2020s, lockdowns induced by the Covid-19 pandemic resulted in an abrupt hiatus of all in-person hardstyle events, greatly limiting the ability for artists to earn an income by performing. Following this setback, in 2021, further challenges awaited, with Radical Redemption's father passing away after a prolonged battle with cancer. Radical Redemption had always maintained transparency about the manner in which his fathers health had personally affected him.

With a rapidly changing personal and professional landscape, Radical Redemption was looking at ways to reflect his growth musically, and wanted to make changes to his performances. He had previously signed a new contract with his booking agent, Most Wanted Agency, in 2019. Most Wanted also legally represented Radical Redemption's record label at the time, Minus is More. 50% of Most Wanted was acquired by ID&T in 2019, and subsequently came under ownership of entertainment conglomerate Superstruct in 2021.

=== Departure from Most Wanted & Legal Case ===
During the covid lockdowns, Radical Redemption came up with a new live musical concept, involving a live orchestra and several time-coded drones to blend hardstyle, classical music, and the best of modern technology into one experience. Radical Redemption & his Orchestra of Eternity was presented to fans at Intents Festival in May 2022, but failed to make any other appearances during the festival season. Court documents reveal that Radical Redemption originally covered the expenses of this new show (also including commissioning artwork, photography and videography) and was expected to have these reimbursed by Most Wanted at some point in the future. Radical Redemption alleges that the agency did not promote his new show adequately, and therefore were not supporting him in generating a sustainable income stream from the performance. Most Wanted did not agree to reimbursing him for all the costs he had incurred, and he felt they were not supporting his development as an artist, preferring him to "just playing [sic] records with his USBs". Since the ID&T shareholding commenced, he felt that the circumstances at Most Wanted had changed and was therefore justified in terminating his booking contract.

In early 2023, Radical Redemption joined booking agent Anna's Agency, which hosts other notable EDM talent, such as Hardwell, Maddix, Cosmic Gate, W&W and Yellow Claw. Following this, Most Wanted sued Radical Redemption on the grounds that they had an exclusive agreement to manage his bookings, and wanted him to return to the agency and pay extensive damages, resulting in his assets being seized as the case was heard. In April 2023, a judge ruled in his favour and made clear to Most Wanted that they could not force an artist to continue to play for them against his own will, and ordered them to cover legal costs. However, Radical Redemption was still liable for some damages as a result of the premature contract termination, which he never contested, and the parties would have to come to a financial settlement out of court. The case drew comparisons to the Bosman Ruling, which ruled that Belgian footballer Jean-Marc Bosman was unlawfully forced by his parent club from leaving, unfairly restricting his ability to play freely.

=== Settlement ===
The financial settlement as a result of this ruling dragged on for a number of years, during which time Radical Redemption was not booked by any festival belonging to Superstruct. This included Q-Dance festivals such as QAPITAL and Defqon.1, Art of Dance festivals such as Supremacy and Syndicate, and B2S events such as Decibel Outdoor, some of the biggest festivals in the dutch hardstyle scene. His former record label, Minus is More, was also associated with Most Wanted, resulting in his departure. However, he started his own record label, Redemption Records, and was therefore able to release music even while being absent from the scene's biggest events.

Throughout the entire experience, Radical Redemption expressed an interest in educating new artists about the business side of the music, and claimed the industry needed to make some fundamental changes. Settlement between the two parties was finally reached in early 2025, and while many lineups for the festival season had already been decided at that point, he was finally able to make a return to Supremacy (home to some of the biggest moments in his career) for the first time in three years.

== Collaborations ==
=== Rawstyle Groups ===
==== Minus Militia ====
At Hard Bass 2014, Radical Redemption performed alongside fellow rawstyle producer Chain Reaction and long time collaborator Crypsis for the first time. The new group, named Minus Militia, premiered their upcoming album later that same year at the first edition of Supremacy, for which they also produced the anthem. Their debut album, Legion of Strength, was released at the end of 2014.

It is reported that Minus Militia had fourteen performances together in 2014 and 2015, including the aforementioned performances at Hard Bass and Supremacy, as well as sets at Masters of Hardcore, Intents Festival and Defqon.1. A magazine review of Supremacy's 2015 edition commented that "... at each festival, you see at least 100 Minus Militia shirts", highlighting their popularity amongst the rawstyle community during this time. The trios activity eventually slowed down to accommodate the release of Radical Redemption's third album, The One Man Army. Towards the middle of 2016, they announced they would resume performing together. They released their second album, Militant Mayhem, towards the end of 2016.

While there were no official announcements about the fate of the group, Minus Militia played for the last time before an extended break at Reverze, in early 2020. This performance was the final hardstyle act on the main stage at the 2020 edition of Reverze, and they used the opportunity to present their third studio album, The Code of Conduct, which had released late the previous year. Their social media pages did not see any activity past 2021, leaving many to fear that the trio was officially over. Radical Redemption's departure from record-label Minus is More due to legal disputes made a return increasingly unlikely.

In 2026, Minus Militia returned for a once-off performance at the debut Supremacy Classics event, over a decade after they produced the anthem for the original edition of Supremacy. Following this performance, the trio were announced as part of the Hard Bass 2026 lineup, for the first edition of Hard Bass since 2019. In October, Minus Militia presented the live act for Team Red, and released the anthem for the return of Hard Bass: Recover the Archive. Their closing set combined their old sound along with newly created tracks for the occasion, with fans expectant of new music.

==== Marshals of Mayhem ====
In 2025, Radical Recemption started the group Marshals of Mayhem, along with MC Nolz & Ukrainian rawstyle producer, Unresolved. Unresolved and Radical Redemption's 2024 collaboration "Slayer of Kings" was a popular track, with both artists being described as being at the forefront of "OG Raw". "OG Raw" is a subgenre of hardstyle Radical Redemption described as having "a powerful melody, sharp screeches, and a dark atmosphere, all brought to life by those filthy kicks", with the OG label harking back to the original raw sound in the early 2010s. Their collaborative work on this track was seen as the genesis point for the Radical Redemption's decision to start the collaborative creative project.

Following their debut performance at Intents Festival in May 2025, where they premiered 7 new tracks, they released their first single, "We Are The Marshals" in late July. All their music to date has been released on Redemption Records. In an interview, Radical Redemption did not rule out the possibility of an album for the group, but didn't make any promises. Since their 2025 debut, the group seldom play together, although at time of writing, they have released two more singles and performed as a trio on a few occasions.

=== Pop Collaboration with Flemming ===
At Intents Festival in 2025, Radical Redemption premiered a collaboration with Dutch popular singer Flemming: "Spiegel Aan De Wand" ("Mirror on the Wall"). The song was dedicated to the passing of his father, and the lyrics discuss the importance of their relationship, not only for him personally but also for the development of his career.

The track was subsequently released in February 2026 with an accompanying music video, and it was announced the single would also be part of Flemming's upcoming album, Samen Is Leuker Dan Alleen. While the album contained another EDM collaboration, with DJ Hardwell, "Spigel Aan De Wand" was Flemming's first time releasing music in collaboration with a hard dance artist. Following its release, the track peaked at No. 93 on the Dutch music charts Top 100 Songs.

== Discography ==
=== Albums ===
| Album | Year | Label |
|---|---|---|
| Annihilate | 2012 | Minus Is More |
| The Spell of Sin | 2013 | Minus Is More |
| The One Man Army | 2015 | Minus Is More, Cloud 9 Dance |
| The Road to Redemption | 2017 | Minus Is More, Cloud 9 Dance |
| Command and Conquer | 2018 | Minus Is More |
| Chronicles of Chaos | 2020 | Minus Is More |
| No Retaliation (Pt.1: The Solo's) | 2024 | Redemption Records |
| No Retaliation (Pt.2: The Collaborations) | 2025 | Redemption Records |

=== Singles ===
| Single | Artist(s) | Label | Year |
|---|---|---|---|
| "Atomic Warfare" | Radical Redemption, Crypsis | None | 2014 |
| "Watch Yourself" | Radical Redemption | Minus Is More | 2014 |
| "Brutal 4.0" | Radical Redemption | Minus Is More | 2014 |
| "The Black Demon" | Digital Punk | Minus Is More | 2014 |
| "Secret Syndicates" | Radical Redemption | Minus Is More | 2014 |
| "Frontliner & Radical Redemption" | Frontliner, Radical Redemption | Keep It Up Music | 2014 |
| "Impact of Sin" | Radical Redemption, Chain Reaction | Minus Is More | 2015 |
| "Triple Six" | Radical Redemption, Deepack | Minus Is More | 2015 |
| "The Funfair of Madness" | Radical Redemption | Minus Is More | 2015 |
| "Blood, Sweat & Tears" | Digital Punk, Radical Redemption, Crypsis | A² Records | 2015 |
| "Kill Me" | Radical Redemption, D-Sturb | Minus Is More | 2016 |
| "Smack Bitches" | Radical Redemption | Minus Is More | 2016 |
| "MMIX" | Radical Redemption | Minus Is More | 2016 |
| "Coitus" | Radical Redemption, Digital Punk | Minus Is More | 2016 |
| "Extreme" | Radical Redemption, Sub Zero Project | Minus Is More | 2016 |
| "Protest of Indignation" | Digital Punk, Radical Redemption | A² Records | 2016 |
| "Order of Hostility" | Angerfist, Radical Redemption | Masters of Hardcore | 2016 |
| "Reloaded" | Hard Driver, Radical Redemption | Dirty Workz | 2017 |
| "Brutal 6.0" | Radical Redemption | Minus Is More | 2017 |
| "Undercover" | Radical Redemption, Warface | Minus Is More | 2017 |
| "The Saviour" | High Voltage, Radical Redemption | Fusion Records | 2017 |
| "Brutal 7.0" | Radical Redemption | Minus Is More | 2018 |
| "Brutal 8.0" | Radical Redemption | Minus Is More | 2019 |
| "Reincarnation" | Radical Redemption | Minus Is More | 2020 |
| "Contaminated Children" | Radical Redemption | Minus Is More | 2020 |
| "10 Seconds" | Radical Redemption, Crypsis | Minus Is More | 2020 |
| "Stronger & Better" | Radical Redemption | Minus Is More | 2020 |
