= Let's Get Together =

Let's Get Together may refer to:

== Books ==
- "Let's Get Together" (short story), a story by Isaac Asimov

== Music ==
=== Albums ===
- Let's Get Together (Tammy Wynette album), 1977
- Let's Get Together (Dickey Betts Band album), 2001

=== Songs ===
- "Let's Get Together" (Hayley Mills song)
- "Get Together" (Youngbloods song), also known as "Let's Get Together"
- "Let's Get Together", a song by Alexander O'Neal
- "Let's Get Together", a song by Eddie Cochran from Legendary Masters Series
- "Let's Get Together", a song by Girl Authority from Road Trip
- "Let's Get Together", a song by KC and the Sunshine Band from KC Ten
- "Let's Get Together", a song by Newton Faulkner from the album Rebuilt by Humans
- "Let's Get Together", a song by Brother Wallace from the album Electric Love

== See also ==
- "Let's Get Together Now", a song used as an anthem for the 2002 World Cup
- "Let's Stick Together" (song), recorded by Canned Heat, Bryan Ferry, and others
- Get Together (disambiguation)
