= Frenchcore =

Subgenre of hardcore techno

- Stylistic origins: Early hardcore, mainstream hardcore, freetekno, happy hardcore, hardstyle
- Cultural origins: Mid-1990s, France, the Netherlands
- Typical instruments: Digital audio workstation, keyboards, synthesizer, drum machine, sequencer, sampler

Subgenres
- Euphoric Frenchcore

Regional scenes
- Netherlands, Germany, France, Austria, Switzerland, Italy, Spain, United States

Other topics
- Hardcore

Frenchcore is a subgenre of hardcore techno. The style differs from other forms of hardcore in terms of a faster tempo, usually above 160–185 BPM, and a loud and distorted offbeat bassline.

In the 1990s, drum machines and samplers were used to make this style. As technology developed, DAWs such as Ableton and Cubase became the standard for production. Modern frenchcore is often performed with live musical performers and sampling alongside a DJ set.

== History ==
Frenchcore is a product of the rave and freetekno scenes in France dating back to the mid-1990s. The first frenchcore act, Micropoint, was founded by DJ Radium and Al Core in 1992. In 1994, DJ Radium focused on his solo career and became known as the most significant contributor to the genre in the late 1990s. He founded Psychik Genocide, one of the first frenchcore labels. Radium eventually became a touring artist and performed across Europe and in the United States. The genre remained underground for many years, being based mostly in France and Italy with artists as Androgyn Network, The Sickest Squad, Psiko, Maissouille, X-Fly and DOM.

In the second half of the 2000s the genre, which initially relied on industrial loops, percussion, vocal chops and rhythmic effects, started to develop an alternative melodic and psychedelic style, influenced by UK hardcore and trance music. This trend, initially experimented with by artists such as The Speed Freak, Hunterwolf and Roms, took a different direction from the classic frenchcore sound pioneered by DJ Radium.

The 2010s saw the reinvention of frenchcore, the rise of new artists, and a heavy Dutch influence as the genre became increasingly more popular in the Netherlands. In 2011, the first edition of "Frenchcore S'il Vous Plait" took place in Culemborg; 2012's edition of Thunderdome, the world's biggest hardcore festival, had an area dedicated exclusively to frenchcore. In 2014, Defqon.1, the world's largest hardstyle festival, added a frenchcore stage for the first time.

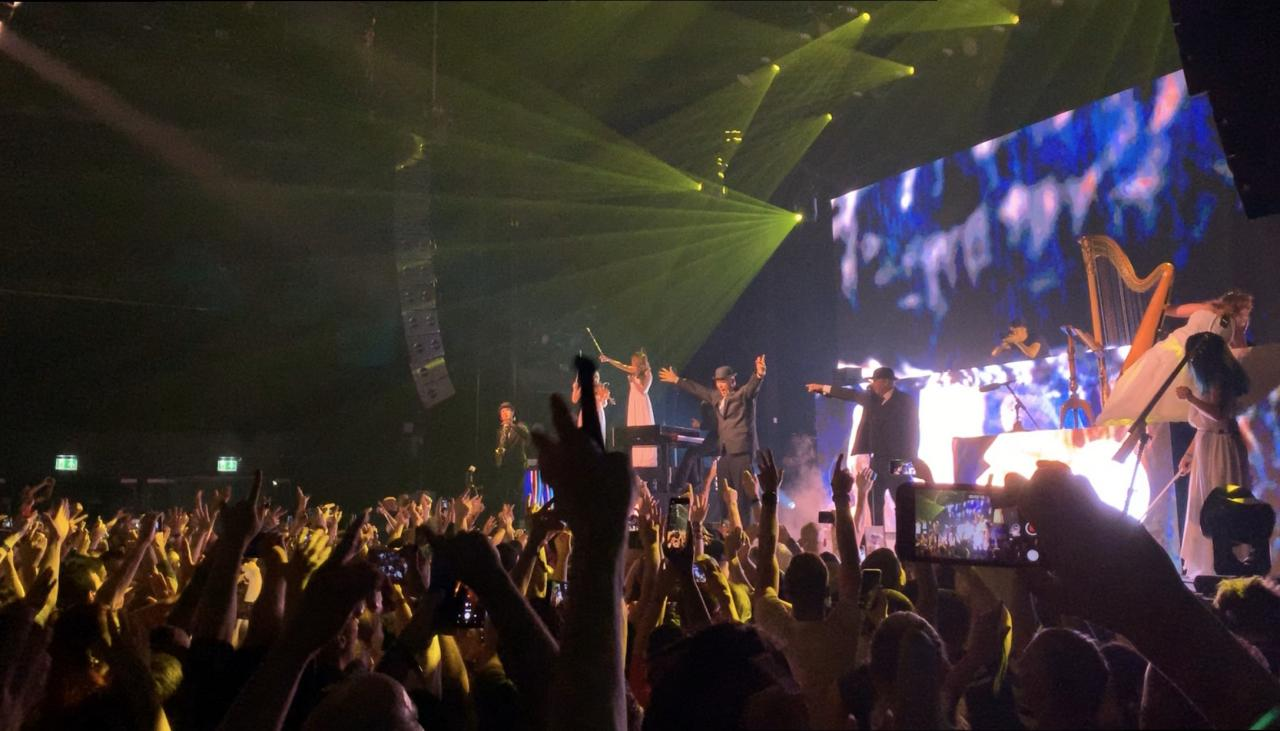
Dr. Peacock performing with live musicians in Tilburg at Peacock in Concert (2019)

The releases on Peacock Records deepened the shift in the genre to an even more harmonic and modern sound created by younger producers. In 2016, modern frenchcore's popularity expanded beyond Europe for the first time when Dr. Peacock toured through the United States with performances in New York City, Denver, Phoenix and Pittsburgh. Dr. Peacock also performed in Sydney, Australia, that same year.

Several members of Peacock Records started taking more inspiration from hardstyle artists and calling their genre "Euphoric frenchcore" around the year 2016. With the new melodic influence in the genre, the style began to appeal to listeners of hardstyle. Many frenchcore artists began experimenting with the integration of live instruments in their performances, as opposed to performances only using DJ equipment. The genre's popularity grew rapidly when Dr. Peacock's 17 year old protégé Sefa released his first album "Leven is Lijden" in 2018. The album introduced many hardstyle fans to frenchcore, and Sefa began to perform at major hardstyle festivals regularly.

Frenchcore's presence at harder styles festivals grew in the year 2018. Dr. Peacock performed on the main stage of Defqon.1 and closed out Qlimax, Q-dance's yearly indoor event at the Gelredome. He was the first artist to play a frenchcore set in the event's history. In 2019, Sefa was responsible for the first frenchcore Defqon.1 anthem, and performed the closing set of the festival.

The music industry suffered significant losses due to the COVID-19 pandemic in 2020, causing many events to happen virtually. Dr. Peacock performed with live musicians at the Pyramid of Austerlitz as part of the virtual edition of Defqon.1, and Sefa performed in a hot air balloon as part of Mysteryland's virtual edition. That summer, Masters of Hardcore launched a new euphoric frenchcore label in collaboration with Re-Style, Rapture Records. In the fall of 2020, Q-dance released their first film Qlimax: The Source, which features a frenchcore section produced by Sefa. The film was added to Netflix on December 22.

In 2021, Dr. Peacock and Sefa performed with several live musicians on the Dutch sailboat De Vrijheid on the IJsselmeer as part of Defqon.1 at Home. A few days later, they played a 30 minute frenchcore set on Dutch national radio station SLAM!. In the end of the summer, Sefa performed frenchcore sets at multiple Unmute Us protests in Amsterdam in protest of the Dutch government's treatment of the entertainment sector during the ongoing COVID-19 crisis. The protests filled the streets of Amsterdam with 70,000 protestors. At the Leiden edition of the protests in September, frenchcore and uptempo event organization BKJN Events organised a full lineup of frenchcore and uptempo music at the protest.

== Style and performance ==
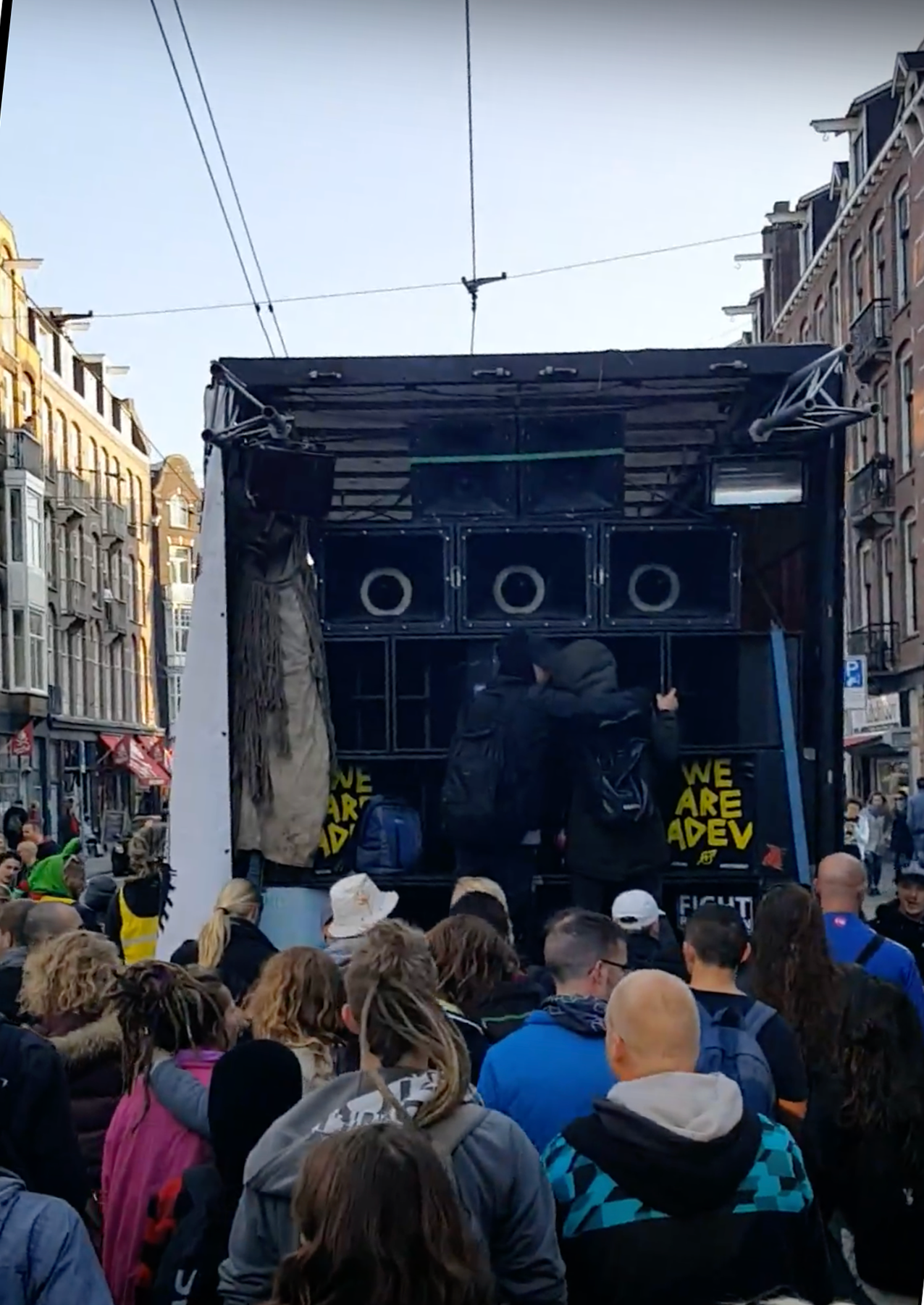
Frenchcore music performed on a mobile sound system at Amsterdam Dance Event (2016)

Frenchcore is characterized first and foremost by its fast tempo and offbeat distorted bassline. Frenchcore, like most forms of electronic dance music, was initially only produced in 4/4 time. The style has recently developed to include different time signatures such as 3/4 and 5/8 and more advanced compositions influenced by classical music. Since the mid-2010s, tracks have become more harmonic through the use of pitched kick and bass, just like hardstyle or mainstream hardcore. A frenchcore track typically either has a melody accompanied with the kick and bass harmonically, or the kick and bass on its own in a rhythm focused form.

Tempo wise, frenchcore is usually performed at around 200 beats per minute with variation. Since frenchcore tracks are produced at different tempos and performers have to account for their timeslots and different types of events, the tempos within a frenchcore set can vary from 180 BPM all the way to 220 or more, with artists sometimes ending their performances with terror or speedcore. Since uptempo hardcore lies in a similar BPM range, frenchcore artists sometimes mix in uptempo tracks into their sets. Artists from both genres often perform on stage side by side together mixing both genres in one set.

Initially, frenchcore was performed by a DJ or a sound system (see free tekno) playing vinyl records. The genre could be heard at nightclubs or teknivals. Modern frenchcore performances often take place at nightclubs, concert halls or music festivals, are now much more commercial and performed on standard DJ equipment. They also sometimes feature extra instruments to add a live element to the show.

== See also ==
- Dr. Peacock
- Hakken
- Hardstyle
- List of gabber artists
- List of electronic music genres
