= Mainstream hardcore =

Musical subgenre of hardcore techno

- Stylistic origins: Early hardcore
- Cultural origins: Early 1990s, Netherlands (Rotterdam)

Fusion genres
- Tekno, breakcore

Regional scenes
- Netherlands, Germany, Belgium, Italy

Other topics
- Hardcore

Mainstream hardcore, mainstyle or nu style gabber is a subgenre of hardcore techno. The essence of mainstream hardcore sound is a distorted bass drum sound, overdriven to the point where it becomes clipped into a distorted square wave and makes a recognizably melodic tone.

Often the Roland Alpha Juno or the kick from a Roland TR-909 was used to create this sound. Mainstream hardcore tracks typically include samples and synthesized melodies with the typical tempo ranging from 165 to 180 bpm. Violence, drugs and profanity are common themes in mainstream hardcore, perceptible through its samples and lyrics, often screamed, pitch shifted, or distorted.

== History ==
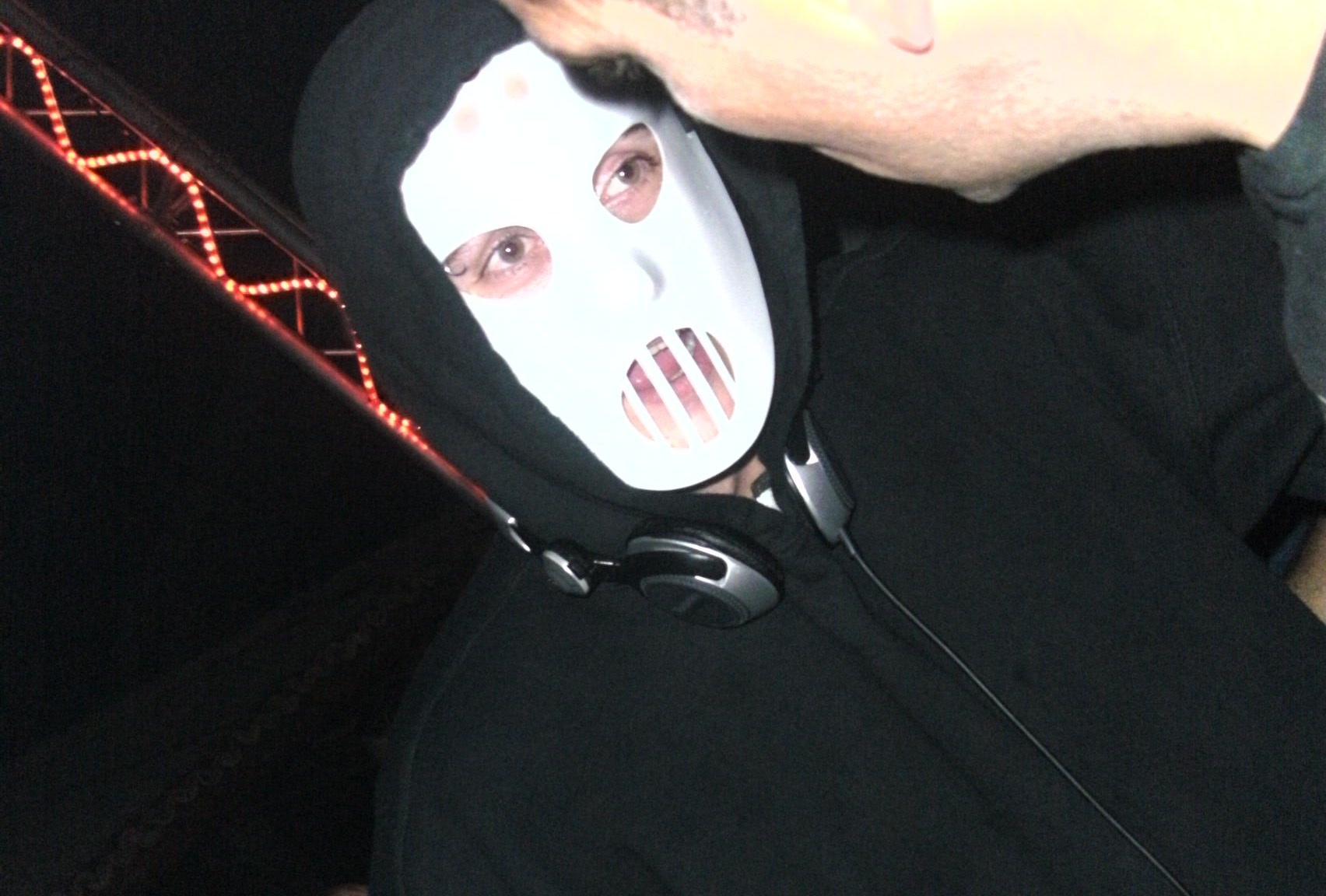
Angerfist, one of the most famous DJs of mainstream hardcore.

The mainstream hardcore sound derives from early hardcore (still called gabber at the time). In the late 1990s, early hardcore became less popular than Hardstyle. After surviving underground for a number of years, in 2002 Gabber regained some popularity in the Netherlands, although the sound is more mature, darker, and industrial. Some producers started embracing a slower style characterized by a deeper, harder bass drum that typically had a longer envelope than was possible in the traditional, faster style. In this aspect, this new form of gabber obviously cannot be considered less powerful than its precursor. This newer sound was referred to as "New Style" or "Mainstream" and as the tempo got slower and slower it began to become similar to Chicago hard house. Many hardcore enthusiasts hated Chicago hard house and the club scene it typified, and frequently DJs would be booed by one group of fans and cheered for by another at the same party, depending on the tempo and style of music they were playing. This is similar to the rivalry and mutual dislike that surfaced earlier between fans of "regular" hardcore and happy hardcore. Eventually the two styles met in the middle, and most gabber today is produced in a range of 160-180 bpm. This style is typically a bit slower than the Rotterdam style of the mid-1990s.

== Hardcore dance ==
There's also a hardcore dance called hakken (or hakkûh), which involves rhythmically moving your feet to the beat of music. It originated in the 1990s and was danced at raves and gabber parties. Currently, hakken comes in two styles: old-school and nu-style.

== Style ==
Mainstream hardcore is characterized by its bass drum sound. Essentially, it comes from taking a normal synthesized bass drum and over-driving it heavily. The approximately sinusoidal sample starts to clip into a square wave with a falling pitch. This results in a number of effects: the frequency spectrum spreads out, thus achieving a louder, more aggressive sound. It also changes the amplitude envelope of the sound by increasing the sustain. Due to the distortion, the drum also develops a melodic tone. It is not uncommon for the bass drum pattern to change pitch throughout the song to follow the bass line. Many tracks rely on a clean, detuned supersaw lead, similar to uplifting trance and can therefore sound "happy".

== Notable record labels ==
- Enzyme Records
- ID&T
- Masters of Hardcore
- Rotterdam Records

== See also ==
- List of gabber artists
- Hakken
