= Get It Together =

Get It Together may refer to:

== Music ==
- "Get It Together" (Beastie Boys song), 1994
- "Get It Together" (James Brown song), 1967
- "Get It Together" (Drake song), 2017
- "Get It Together" (The Jackson 5 song), 1973
- "Get It Together" (Seal song), 2002
- "Get It Together" (702 song), 1997
- "Get It Together", a song by The Go! Team
- G.I.T.: Get It Together, a 1973 album by the Jackson 5
- Get It Together!, an album by the Supersuckers

== Other ==
- Get It Together (British TV series), a children's music show broadcast in the United Kingdom from 1977 to 1981
- Get It Together (Australian TV series), a 2019 Australian children's television game show
- WarioWare: Get It Together!, a 2021 Nintendo Switch action game
