= Angerfist =

Dutch hardcore DJ and music producer (born 1981)

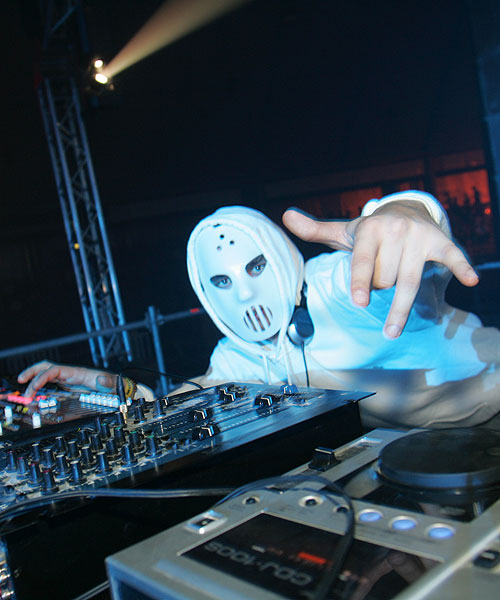

Background information
- Also known as: Menace II Society; Kid Morbid; Bloodcage; Denekamps Gespuis; Floorcrushers; M4ZE PUSHER
- Born: 20 June 1981 (age 45); Denekamp, Netherlands
- Genres: Hardcore, gabber
- Years active: 2001–present
- Label: Masters of Hardcore
- Website: angerfist.nl

Danny Masseling (born 20 June 1981), better known by his stage name Angerfist, is a Dutch hardcore producer and DJ. He has maintained popularity in the hardcore genre for an extended duration, and is often referred to as the "King of Hardcore". Many claim that his music, featuring distorted kicks and aggressive vocals, has defined the modern hardcore sound.

Aside from his main alias, he also produces other genres and subgenres under various aliases and is part of the groups the Supreme Team (with Outblast, Tha Playah & Evil Activities), Masters Elite (with Catscan and Outblast), and Roland & Sherman (with Outblast).

During live acts, Angerfist is accompanied by MC Prozac (Minne Roos), who, since 2013, has adopted the DJ Bloodcage alias which he previously shared with Angerfist. Angerfist and MC Prozac have chosen not show their real face during performances, opting to wear a white hockey mask instead.

== Career ==
=== Early Years ===
Angerfist started making music at the age of 16. Beginning with 4-beat programmed loops and breakbeats, his interest in producing music started to grow. He began his career in 2001 after sending a demo to Mark Vos, also known as DJ Buzz Fuzz, director of BZRK Records. Vos liked the tape and signed Angerfist, who then released his first EPs under the names Menace II Society and Angerfist. Angerfist soon gained popularity in the gabber scene because of the aggressive "nustyle" sound he made. His style is characterized by hard bass drums and vocals sampled from various media. Film and television samples are common in his music, and his love for 90s-00s gangsta rap has seen this influence his musical style and lyrics. By the mid 2000s, he already had several popular hardcore tracks to his name, including "Dance with the Wolves", "Raise Your Fist" (the lyrics "Raise your Fist, for Angerfist!" have since become synonymous with his brand), and "Riotstarter". His increasing popularity gave him the opportunity to produce the anthem for Masters of Hardcore in 2005, titled "The World Will Shiver".

=== Performances & Mask ===
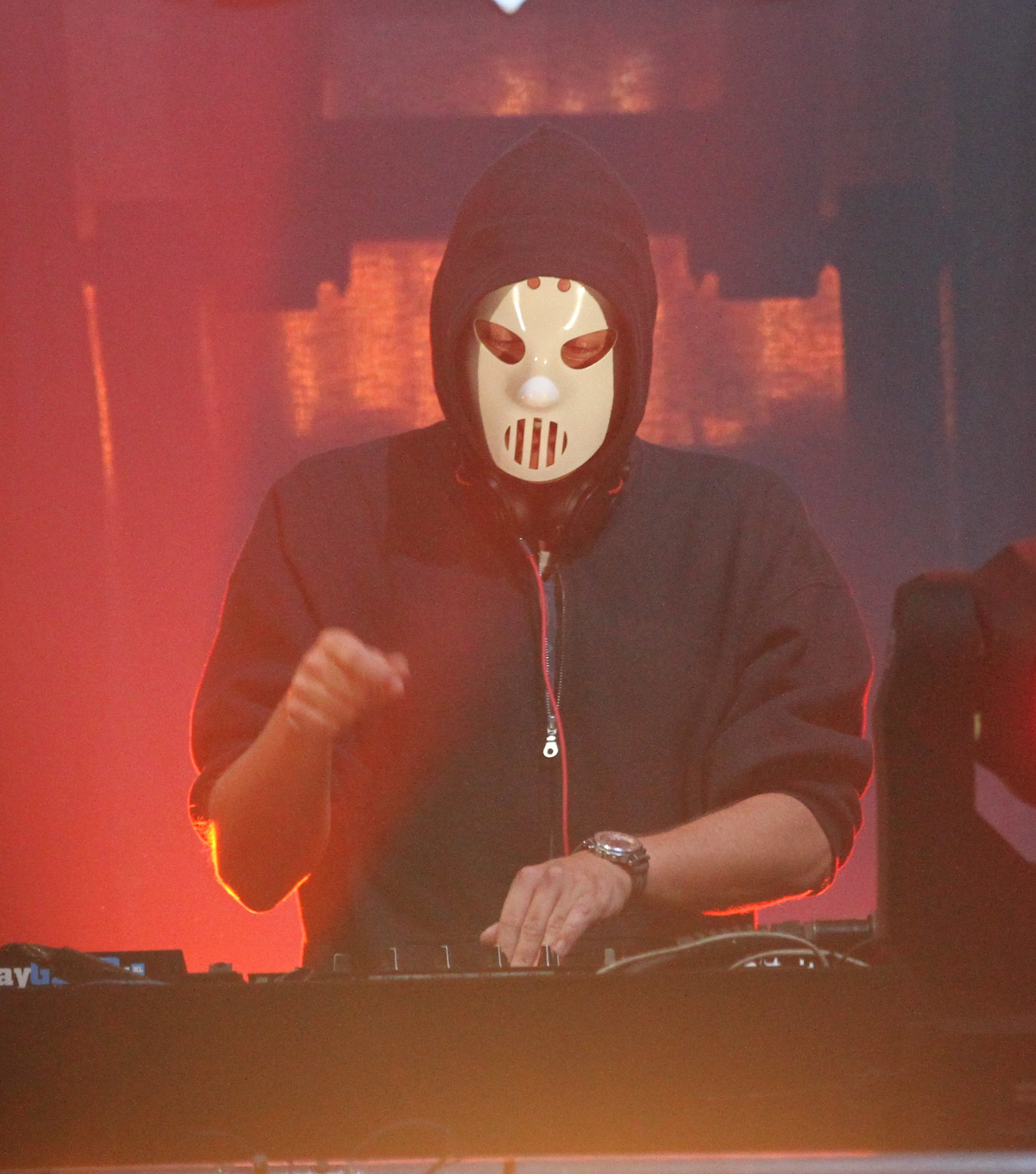
Angerfist performing at Syndicate 2013 (Westfalenhallen, Dortmund), wearing a black hoodie and his iconic hockey mask.

Angerfist has performed at many well known harder styles events such as Sensation Black, Masters of Hardcore, Defqon. 1, Knockout Outdoor, Mysteryland, Thunderdome and Dominator. He has also played at several mainstream EDM events, such as EDC Las Vegas, Tomorrowland, Electric Love and Ultra Music Festival. Angerfist's performances are well known for his Friday-the-13th inspired white hockey mask, with a similar mask being worn by the main antagonist of the horror movie series: Jason Voorhees. The mask is accompanied by a black hoodie which completely obscures any defining features. In a 2017 interview with Insomniac, Angerfist explained that he started wearing the mask because of stage fright, and wanted audiences to focus on listening to his music instead of his on-stage personality. While he concedes that he no longer experiences anxiety when going to play in front of large audiences, he keeps the mask as an integral and unique part of his brand's iconography:

"Many people wear the mask and hoodie at events, which is a cool sight to see when you’re playing a set. Unintentionally, it was one of the best choices I made in my career."

In July 2013, it was announced that the Bloodcage project would feature MC Prozac (in his alias of DJ Bloodcage) as the live face of the project, while still involving both artists (MC Prozac and Angerfist) in its studio output.

=== Albums & Compilations ===
At time of writing, Angerfist has released 7 albums. His 2006 debut album, Pissin' Razorbladez, contained 31 tracks as well as the first Angerfist Megamix. The Megamix was a mashup of his most popular songs from his career to date, and he would go on to release several more, including annually on his youtube channel from 2010-2017. His debut album was followed by Mutilate, with 30 tracks, in 2008, and Retaliate, with 45 tracks over 3 CDs, in late 2011. He released another 3 CD album, The Deadfaced Dimension, in 2014, with his favourite track from the release being "Messing With The Wrong Man". The album went on to have a release party at the Brabanthallen, featuring other prominent artists from he hardcore scene. The following year, Raise & Revolt was released to positive reviews from critics, even if it didn't live up to the high expectations of The Deadfaced Dimension. The 2 CD album contained 15 new tracks on CD 1, and 39 classic tracks on the 2nd CD. Angerfist returned with another popular hardcore lineup to the Brabanthallen for the album release party. Creed of Chaos, his 6th album, contained popular tracks such as the title track (with vocals from Nolz) and "Pennywise", with a horror aesthetic intensified by a vocal sample from the film adaptation of IT. His 7th and final album to date, Diabolic Dice, is far shorter than his previous works, with only 6 tracks (one to represent each side of a die) better resembling an EP than a full length album. The album's release event was held at AFAS Live in late 2019.

=== Charting Poll Successes ===
In DJ Mag's Top 100 DJ edition of 2011, Angerfist made his debut appearance on the list, featuring at #39. Over the years which followed, he remained a mainstay in the middle of the list, consistently placing in the 30s and 40s until 2021. As of 2026, his career high ranking on the list was No. 29, which he achieved in 2018. He was ranked No. 71 on the DJ Mag list for 2023, which also marked his 13th consecutive, and final year featuring in the list. He is one of the only hardcore artists to have appeared consistently on the list; the only other noteworthy inclusion being his wife: Miss K8. Some have criticised his involvement in the list, with critics arguing that his inclusion and involvement commercialises the hardcore sound.

Angerfist spent many years voted as DJ Mag's Top 100 "Highest Hard" artist, often competing with compatriot hardstyle artist Headhunterz for recognition as the worlds most popular DJ producing harder sounds. Angerfist won this award a total of 7 times, including three straight years from 2014 to 2016,, and four straight years from 2020 to 2023, which marked his final stint atop the category. American Hard Techno artist Sara Landry has since gone on to redefine the category, winning the Highest Hard in 2024 and 2025.

"I think any artist will agree that it’s good to get some recognition for what you do. It doesn’t need to be in the shape of a chart or a list but it definitely doesn’t hurt either..."

— Angerfist, Masters of Hardcore Interview, 2021

Masters of Hardcore conducts an annual poll amongst fans to vote for their favourite hardcore tracks released in throughout calendar year. Angerfist's tracks have won this poll on a number of occasions:

- 2014: "Knock Knock" - featuring Heisenberg's "I am the one who knocks" line, from popular series Breaking Bad
- 2019: "The Heartless" (with Tha Playah)
- 2020: "Face My Style" (with Tha Playah)
- 2021: "What Happened"

With his wins during the years of COVID-19 lockdowns (2020 & 2021), where the hardcore scene was not permitted to host events due to the risk of viral infection, Angerfist remarked that it was a unique experience to win the award for a track which fans didn't hear at a festival or party, but rather, listening from the comfort of their own home.

=== Collaborations & Other Genres ===
In the 2010s, Angerfist broadened his musical repertoire to begin collaborations with raw hardstyle artists, outside of the traditional hardcore scene. In 2016, he produced the anthem for Airforce Festival, in collaboration with Radical Redemption, who was seen as the biggest name in the rawstyle scene at the time. Later, Warface and Angerfist wold cross paths, with rumours of a collaboration beginning in 2018. Warface had previously collaborated with other hardcore artists, such as N-Vitral. "Number 1" was released towards the end of 2018 on End of Line Records, with the duo going on to play a unique B2B set at the following year's edition of HardFest. Both Angerfist and Warface wore their signature masks on stage during their performance. In 2026, it was announced that Angerfist would be premiering a B2B set with masked raw hardstyle duo Gunz for Hire, named "Masked Military".

In the mid 2020s, with the emergence of a new hard dance genre: Hard Techno, Angerfist expanded his musical horizons. Whilst he spent the majority of his career producing the modern hardcore most associated with his brand, which is typically played at 180-200 BPM, in 2022, he began to experiment with other genres and producing slightly slower tracks. This progressed further, when he began incorporating hard techno songs into his own sets, and releasing collaborations with techno artists such as Reinier Zonneveld, Gaston Zani, and fellow masked artist CARV. Angerfist believes that the hard techno and hardcore techno are very similar sonically, despite the scenes remaining self-segregated for historical reasons. He also started a new alias, M4ZE PUSHER, with the intention of exploring slower and more minimal genres such as trance, progressive house and techno.

== Discography ==
=== Albums ===
- Pissin' Razorbladez (2006)
- Mutilate (2008)
- Retaliate (2011)
- The Deadfaced Dimension (2014)
- Raise & Revolt (2015)
- Creed of Chaos (2017)
- Diabolic Dice (2019)

=== Singles and EPs ===
Year	Title
2001	My Style From The Darkside
2001	Cannibal
2002	Criminally Insane
2002	Fuck Off
2002	Murder Incorporated
2002	Chronic Disorder (as Menace II Society)
2002	Fear Of Other (as Menace II Society)
2002	Son Of A Bitch (as Menace II Society)
2002	No Escape From My Wrath (as Kid Morbid)
2003	Within The Darkness
2003	It Never Stops
2003	Son Of Satan
2003	The Passages
2003	Bonified Alkoholik Musik Making Muthafucka (B.A.M.M.M)
2003	Maniac Killa
2003	The Number
2003	Necroslave
2003	Break Society Down
2003	Killerfist
2003	Audio Waste
2004	Raise Your Fist
2004	Too Weird To Die
2004	Ultra Rebel
2004	Vato
2004	Shattered Hope
2004	Krazy
2004	Alkoholik (as Menace II Society)
2005	Penis Enlarger (with Akira)
2005	Raise Your Bottle (with Korsakoff)
2005	Dortmund '05
2005	Life
2005	The World Will Shiver (Masters of Hardcore 2005 Anthem)
2005	Chop Chop
2005	The Fast Lane
2006	Stainless Steel
2006	With The Fresh Style
2006	Dance With The Wolves
2006	Towards Isolation
2006	My Critic Fetish
2006	Kidnapped Redneck
2006	Yes
2006	Fuck The Promqueen
2006	Broken Chain (with Crucifier)
2006	Twisting My Mind
2006	Chaos & Evil
2006	Megamix
2007	Somewhere Down The Lane (as Roland & Sherman with Outblast)
2007	Superior (with Outblast & Predator)
2008	Alles Kut Enter (ft. Tomcat & Rudeboy)
2008	TNT (ft. Tomcat & Rudeboy)
2008	Put It Up (with Tomcat & Rudeboy)
2008	Right Through Your Head
2008	Riotstarter
2008	Strangle And Mutilate (as Bloodcage)
2008	In A Million Years
2008	Brother's Keepers (ft. Kokka & Cixx)
2008	Postcard From Hell (with T-Junction)
2008	Radical (Official Dominator 2008 Anthem)
2009	No Fucking Soul
2009	Choices
2009	187 (with Predator)
2009	Anticipate
2009	Tonight (with Crucifier)
2009	Sensational Gargle (ft. Crucifier)
2009	Bite Yo Style
2009	Close To You
2009	Legend (with Predator)
2010	The Voice of Mayhem (with Outblast ft. MC Tha Watcher) (Official 15 Years Masters of Hardcore Anthem)
2010	Delusion (with Outblast)
2010	A New Level of freak (with T-Junction)
2010	No Better Future (with T-Junction)
2010	And Jesus Wept
2010	Megamix 2010
2011	The Depths Of Despair
2011	Incoming
2011	Just Know (with Tieum)
2011	Shitty Rave Track (with Tieum)
2011	Megamix 2011
2012	Buckle Up And Kill
2012	Eraser
2012	Catastrophe (with Outblast & MC Tha Watcher) (Official 2012 Dominator Anthem)
2012	Pagans (with Lowroller)
2012	Santiago (with Miss K8)
2012	The Desecrated
2012	Megamix 2012
2013	Don't Fuck With Me
2013	From The Blackness
2013	Street Fighter
2013	Burn This MF Down
2013	Just Like Me (with Tha Playah ft. MC Jeff)
2013	Megamix 2013
2014	Dirty Man (with Tieum)
2014	Knock Knock
2014	Wake Up Fucked Up (with Negative A)
2014	Megamix 2014
2015	Sock It (with Tieum)
2015	Megamix 2015
2016	Bogota (with Miss K8)
2016	Order Of Hostility (Official Airforce Festival 2016 Anthem) (with Radical Redemption)
2016	Fist In Your Face (with N-Vitral)
2016	Megamix 2016
2017	HOAX (with Furyan)
2017	Blood For Blood (with Bodyshock ft. Tha Watcher)
2017	Die Hard (with Outblast ft. Tha Watcher)
2017	Megamix 2017
2018	Tournament of Tyrants (Official Masters of Hardcore 2018 Anthem) (with Tha Watcher)
2018	Pennywise
2018	Creature
2018	Hustlers (with System Overload)
2018	Nocturnolz (with Nolz & Radical Redemption)
2019	Critter
2019	Bare Knuckle Fist (with N-Vitral)
2019	Impact & Get It Lit (with Miss K8)
2019	Rally Of Retribution (Official Dominator 2019 Anthem) (with Nolz)
2019	Primal Instinct (with Stereotype)
2019	Diabolic Dice
2019	Soldier
2019	Freddy
2019	Attack of the Dice
2019	Solid Stigma
2019	Geto Tremble
2020	Madrid
2020	Mighty Methods
2020	Born To Rule
2020	R3VOLUTION
2020	Virtual Disaster
2020	Reprogrammer
2020	Face My Style
2021	Break Of Dawn
2021	You Ain't Real
2021	What Happened
2021	Prophecy
2022	Beyond Strength
2022	The Other Side
2022	Act On Impulse
2022	Fist On Acid (Techno Mix) (with Reinier Zonneveld)
2022	Bodybag (with Da Mouth of Madness)
2022	The Deadly Fist (with Deadly Guns)
2024	The Dark of the Night (with Gaston Zani)
2025	Shot To The Brain (with CARV)
2025	World On Fire (with Reinier Zonneveld)

=== Remixes ===
Year	Original artist	Title
2002	Outblast	Hey Motherfuckers (Angerfist Remix)
2005	Art Of Fighters vs. Nico & Tetta	I Became Hardcore (Angerfist Remix)
2005	Human Resource	Dominator (Outblast & Angerfist Remix)
2005	Negative A	Suck My Dick (Angerfist Remix)
2005	Noize Suppressor	Bone Crusher (Angerfist Remix)
2005	Outblast	Time To Make A Stand (Outblast & Angerfist Mix)
2007	Paul Elstak	You're a Hardcore Hooligan (Angerfist Remix)
2008	Kasparov ft. MC Raw	We Will Dominate (Angerfist Refix)
2009	Tha Playah	Mastah of Shock (Angerfist Remix)
2010	Korsakoff	Unleash The Beast (Angerfist Remix)
2011	Hellsystem	Shut Up And Die (Angerfist Remix)
2011	Marshall Masters	I Like It Loud (Angerfist Remix)
2012	Nitrogenetics	Pledge Of Resistance (Angerfist Remix)
2012	Marshall Masters ft. The Ultimate MC	I Like It Loud (Angerfist Remix)
2012	Meccano Twins	Complex Man (Angerfist & Predator Remix)
2012	Diss Reaction	Jiiieeehaaa (Angerfist Remix)
2012	Hellsystem	Shut Up & Die (Angerfist Remix)
2013	Re-Style	Renovation (Angerfist Remix)
2013	Skrillex & Damian Marley	Make It Bun Dem (Kid Morbid Remix)
2013	Neophyte & Evil Activities	One of These Days (Angerfist Remix)
2015	Counterfeit & Negative A	Self-Acclaimed Criminals (Angerfist Remix)
2015	Satronica & Unexist	Fuck the System (Angerfist Remix)
2017	Tha Playah	Why So Serious? (Angerfist Remix)
2019	Skrillex & Damian Marley	Make It Bun Dem (Angerfist 2019 Refix)

=== Free releases ===
Year	Title
2003	There You Go
2003	The Steel Finger
2003	Sting Like A Scorpion
2004	Reality
2004	Rollin' The Drumz
2004	The 36th Chamber
2004	Kiss
2004	Representin' Gangsta Shit (with Amnesys)
2004	Back Into Time
2004	Bad Boy
2004	Bad Religion
2004	Blow Your Brain Out
2004	Criminal
2013	Temple of Disease
