= Get It Together (Australian TV series) =

Australian children's television game show

Get It Together is an Australian children's television game show which first aired on ABC ME on 8 July 2019, hosted by Kayne Tremills. Kayne and his drill sergeant (Naomi Higgins) put Australia's messiest, most disorganised and most forgetful families to the ultimate test.
