= Hakken =

Dutch rave dance

- A gabber performing hakken
- Genre: Rave dance
- Year: 1990s
- Origin: Netherlands

Basic footwork for hakken

Hakken or hakkûh is a form of rave dance originating from the Dutch hardcore and gabber scene of the 1990s. The music one is able to do the dance to is also called hakmuziek. The name is derived from the Dutch verb hakken which refers to the heels of the feet.

The dance consists of steps that quickly follow each other to the rhythm of the bass drum. As for the namesake of the dance style, these steps often land on the heel of the foot. The lower body (down from the pelvis) is the most important part, though it is not unusual to move the arms and torso as well. The dance is usually done fairly quickly, since this style of music can easily reach 190 BPM.

Although originally associated with Dutch hardcore of the 1990s (commonly referred to as early hardcore or gabber), in the contemporary rave scene, people are dancing hakken to nearly every genre that falls under Hard Dance, including hardstyle, rawstyle, uptempo hardcore, and frenchcore.

The style and culture vary between countries, most notably with the Australian hakken (often pronounced like "hack" rather than "hawk"). This variant is often performed to Rawstyle. Italian Freestyle has similar basics, but (as the name implies) incorporates more freestyle movements not seen in traditional hakken. It is usually associated with Millennium, a subgenre of Hardcore.

There are also individual hakken dances, like Hoeppi Hakken, who has greatly influenced the dance with his incorporation of a backstep, and Andrea Limongelli Hakken.
