= Dr. Peacock =

Dutch frenchcore DJ

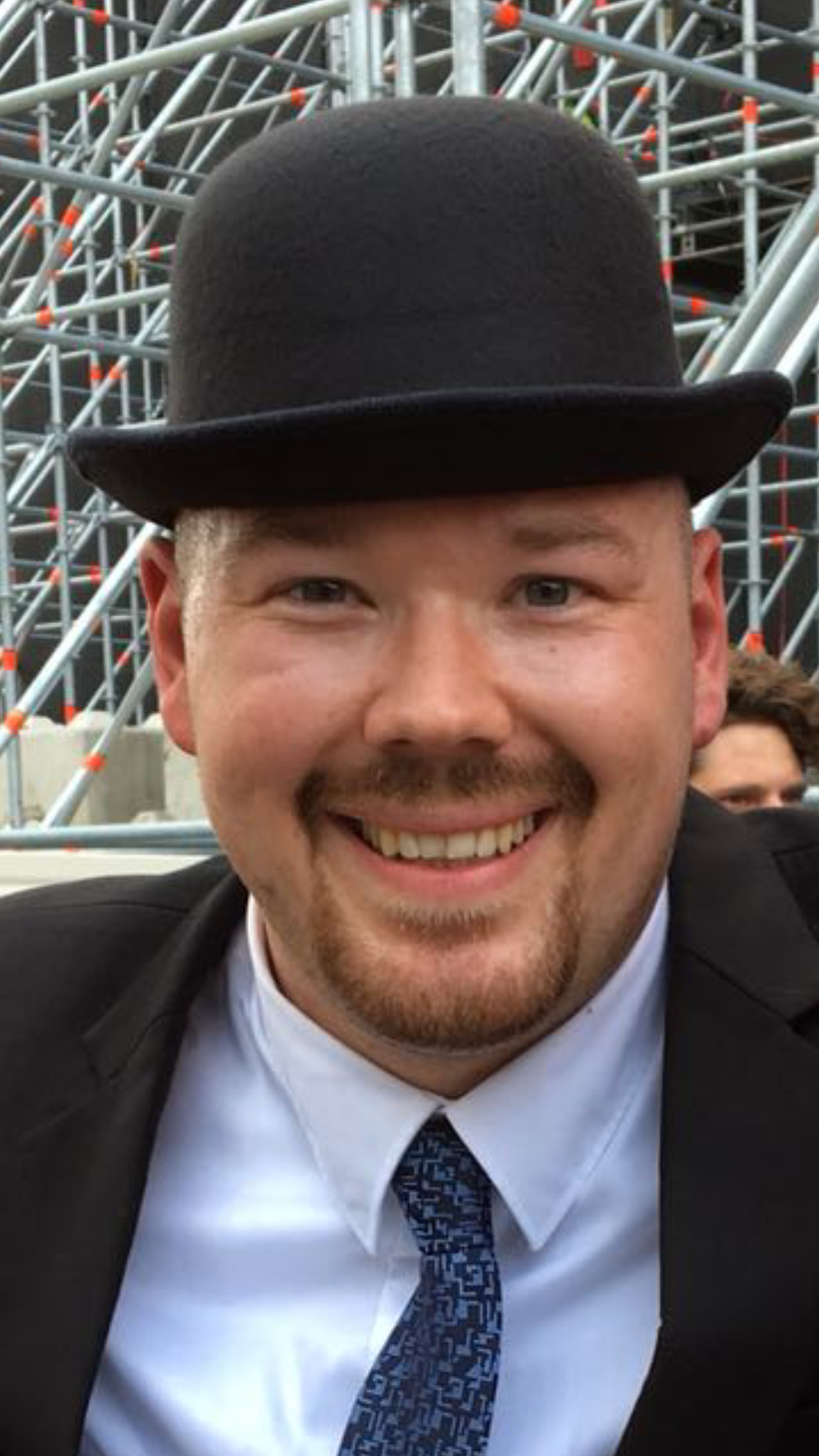

Background information
- Born: 31 July 1988 (age 38); Limmen, Netherlands
- Genre: Frenchcore
- Years active: 2010–present
- Website: www.dr-peacock.com

Stefan Petrus Dekker (born 31 July 1988), better known by his stage name Dr. Peacock, is a Dutch frenchcore DJ and record producer. He has performed on the main stages of major festivals like Thunderdome, Defqon.1, Qlimax and Dominator.

== Biography ==
Dr. Peacock was born in Limmen, Netherlands on 31 July in 1988. In 2005, he found some frenchcore records from The Sickest Squad and DJ Radium, which inspired him to become a frenchcore artist. In 2010, he began his career as a music producer. He quickly gained the attention of BKJN, a Dutch event production company, which asked him to perform at one of their events. The success of his performance event led to BKJN co-hosting an event with him called "Vive la Frenchcore" in 2013. That same year, Dr. Peacock collaborated with Angerfist to produce a track for his album The Deadfaced Dimension.

Frenchcore's popularity grew quickly in The Netherlands, with Dr. Peacock performing at Defqon.1 in 2014. Dr. Peacock founded his label Peacock Records, and started to focus on developing new talent and growing the frenchcore scene. The upbeat and melodic releases on Peacock Records were different from older frenchcore. During this period, Dr. Peacock worked heavily with Sefa, producing collabs such as "This Life Is Lost" and "Trip to Turkey".

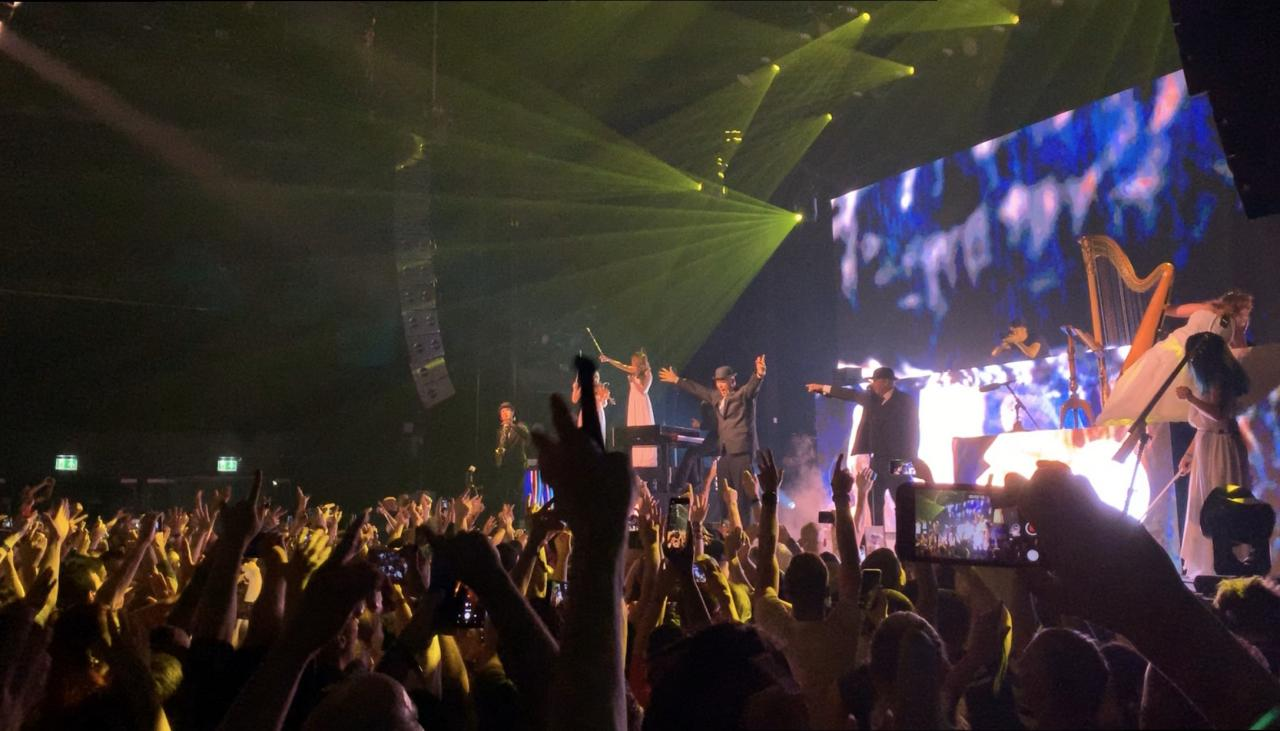
Peacock in Concert in Tilburg (2019)

In 2016, Dr. Peacock toured through the United States as part of the Trauma Harder Styles Tour, and performed in Australia. Following these tours, he announced that he could only continue touring by car or train, as he had developed a health condition relating to air travel.

In 2017, Dr. Peacock founded the label Frenchcore Worldwide and announced a new live act, "Peacock in Concert", featuring live musicians alongside Dr. Peacock. That same year, he performed at Thunderdome. In 2019, Dr. Peacock founded his third label, Euphoric Frenchcore Records, and performed at Qlimax, which was the first frenchcore performance at the event.
