= Electric Love (Brother Wallace album) =

Studio album by Brother Wallace
- Released: May 8, 2026
- Studio: Real World
- Genres: Soul, R&B
- Length: 39:22
- Label: ATO
- Producer: Dan Taylor

Singles from Electric Love
- 1. "Who's That?" Released: November 11, 2025; 2. "Electric Love" Released: January 20, 2026; 3. "Gone With the Wind" Released: February 24, 2026; 4. "Who Do You Love?" Released: March 31, 2026

Electric Love is the first studio album by American soul artist Brother Wallace. It was released on May 8, 2026, and received positive reviews upon release.

== Background and development ==
After a "chance encounter" with Daniel Taylor, the two became collaborators with Taylor eventually producing the album, with additional engineering and mixing by Bob Mackenzie and Jim Abbiss.

== Promotion ==
Several songs including "Who's That?" were performed on CBS Saturday Morning on June 20, 2026, marking his first career performance on television.

== Critical reception ==
The album received relatively positive reviews upon release. Glide Magazine gave a positive review of the album and said, "Electric Love is a lively, gospel-inspired outing from a refreshing voice in the scene. Wallace successfully captured the spiritual, infectious energy of his church upbringing and removed its preachy nature, leaving the artist with plenty of tools to build his first album. There is a raw authenticity to these 13 songs that allows this tracklist to play like something that has existed long before Wallace’s peers even heard a note of soul music, an intrinsic energy that cracks open tropes, allowing the bright light of Wallace’s individuality to shine throughout". A different positive review from Listen With Monger stated, "there have been some great albums this year but if this one isn't in the running for album of the year then we're in for a great second half of 2026".

Mixed With Standards said of the album, "The bigger songs swallow the smaller ones", and gave mixed reviews towards several tracks like "Let's Get Together", stating, "the choir vocals and horn swells of flatten everything around them", and "Jealous", describing the track as "corny".

== Track listing ==
All tracks are written by Christopher Wallace and Daniel Taylor; "No God in This Town" written with Spencer Page.

Electric Love track listing
No.	Title	Length
1.	"Who's That?"	2:48
2.	"You're the Man"	3:22
3.	"Gone with the Wind"	2:33
4.	"Electric Love"	3:10
5.	"Top Shotta"	3:36
6.	"No God in This Town"	5:03
7.	"Who Do You Love?"	2:39
8.	"Any Day Now"	2:59
9.	"A Patient Man"	3:22
10.	"Midnight Valley"	3:34
11.	"Jealous"	3:16
12.	"Hope of Fools"	3:03
13.	"Let's Get Together"	3:01
Total length:		42:17

== Personnel ==
Credits are adapted from Tidal.

- Christopher Wallace – vocals, background vocals (all tracks), piano (tracks 1–3, 5, 7, 10–13)
- Dan Taylor – production (all tracks); bass (1–3), guitar (1–4, 6–9, 11, 13), drums (5, 11, 13); mixing, engineering (11); congas (12)
- Ben Koch – engineering
- Alec Ness – mastering
- Brian Hargreaves – horn arrangements, string arrangements, tenor saxophone
- John Pratt – baritone saxophone
- Alyssa Crayton – background vocals (1–7, 9–11, 13)
- Daniel Hill – background vocals (1–7, 9–11, 13)
- DeMya Milligan – background vocals (1–7, 9–11, 13)
- Christopher Ellul – drums (1–4, 6, 9, 10), engineering (2, 4, 6, 7, 9)
- Bob MacKenzie – mixing (1–3, 5, 8, 9, 12), engineering (1–3, 5, 8, 10, 12, 13)
- Alfie Grieve – trumpet (1, 3, 10, 11, 13)
- Joss Murray – trumpet (2, 4, 6, 7, 9)
- James Gow – cello (3, 8)
- Alex Heane – double bass (3, 8)
- Carlos Augusta Yanez – viola (3, 8)
- Anneka Sutcliffe – violin (3, 8)
- Oisin Mineur – violin (3, 8)
- Spencer Page – bass (4, 6, 7, 9–11, 13), piano (4, 6)
- Toby McLaren – piano (9)
- James Taylor – design
- Hana Snow – photography
- Tim Walter – photography
