= Hardcore (electronic dance music genre) =

Genre of electronic dance music

- Stylistic origins: Techno; acid house; new beat; EBM
- Cultural origins: Late 1980s – early 1990s, Netherlands (Rotterdam), Belgium, Germany (Frankfurt)

Subgenres
- Bouncy techno; raggacore; gabber; happy hardcore; lento violento; mákina; speedcore

Fusion genres
- Breakcore; digital hardcore; dubstyle; hardstyle; jumpstyle; moombahcore; metalstep; nightcore

Local scenes
- Belgium; Frenchcore; J-core

Other topics
- Hardcore punk; electronicore

Hardcore (also known as hardcore techno) is a genre of electronic dance music that originated in the Netherlands, Belgium, and Germany in the early 1990s. It is distinguished by faster tempos (160 to 200 BPM or more) and a distorted sawtooth kick, the intensity of the kicks and the synthesized bass (in some subgenres), the rhythm and the atmosphere of the themes (sometimes violent), the usage of saturation and experimentation close to that of industrial dance music. It would spawn subgenres such as gabber.

== History ==
=== Early 1970s to early 1980s ===
Hardcore is rooted in the 1970s and early 1980s industrial music, specifically the elements of hard electronic dance music. Groups such as Throbbing Gristle, Coil, Cabaret Voltaire, SPK, Foetus and Einstürzende Neubauten produced music using a wide range of electronic instruments. The message diffused by industrial was then very provocative. Some of the musical sounds and experimentation of industrial have directly influenced hardcore since the beginning of the movement.

=== 1980s ===
In the mid-1980s, under the influence of the Belgian group Front 242, electronic body music (EBM), a new genre more accessible and more dancing inspired by industrial and new wave, appeared. This style is characterized by minimalism, cold sounds unlike disco, funk or house, with powerful beats, generally combined with aggressive vocals and an aesthetic close to industrial or punk music. Under the influence of new beat, another Belgian genre and acid house, EBM music became harder. All the elements were present for the arrival of hardcore. The beginnings of the genre are traced at the very end of the 1980s in Belgium, within the new beat scene with the titles Rock to the Beat and Saigon Nightmare by 101 (both 1988), Warbeat by Bassline Boys (1989), I Want You! by the Concrete Beat (1989), I Love You by the Acid Kids (1988), Doughnut Dollies by HNO3 (1988), Action in Paradise by Export (1988), Acid New-Beat by Tribe 22 (1988), I Sit on Acid by Lords of Acid (1988), Acid Rock by Rhythm Device (1989), Double B by Dirty Harry (1989), Also Sprach Zarathustra by Bingo! (1989), Europe by Christine D (1989), and Do That Dance by the Project (1990). In 1988, the Belgian new beat arrived in Frankfurt in West Germany.

The most commonly used wordmark for early hardcore

The term hardcore is not new in the music world. It was first used to designate a more radical movement within punk rock (Black Flag, Minor Threat, Bad Brains...) which, in addition to hardening the music, also attached importance to their attitude and their way of life as in the street where it was born: violent, underground, but engaged and sincere. The term has then been reused when hip-hop emerged in the late 1980s, designating the harder part of hip-hop, with the same characteristics: a harder sound, engaged lyrics and a whole way of life dedicated to respect of their values. The term "hardcore techno" was first used by EBM groups like à;GRUMH..., Pankow, and Leæther Strip in the late 1980s, although their music had nothing to do with hardcore. à;GRUMH...'s "Sucking Energy (Hard Core Mix)", released in 1985, was the first track ever to use the term hardcore, within an EDM context.

=== 1990s ===
In 1990, German producer Marc Trauner (also known as Mescalinum United) released the first hardcore techno track with "We Have Arrived". The British group Together released its track "Hardcore Uproar", also in 1990. Music journalist Simon Reynolds has written books on hardcore techno, covering bands related to the Belgium hardcore scene like Second Phase and T99 or Dutch hardcore bands such as L.A. Style and Human Resource. Many of the iconic "stabs" that would become part of hardcore were popularized by these and other Belgian techno producers during the early 1990s, like the "Mentasm" and the "Anastasia" stabs.

In the early 1990s, the terms "hardcore" and "darkcore" were also used to designate some more aggressive or high tempo forms of techno, breakbeat and drum and bass which were very popular in England, and from which have emerged several famous producers like N-Joi, The Prodigy, Altern-8 and Goldie. One of the earliest uses of the word in the context of English releases/the English rave scene which gained prominence was 1990's "Hardcore Uproar" by Together. The track's title was derived from a promoter of acid house parties of the same name that hosted controversial raves in and around the town of Blackburn, and was agreed on between the members of Together and Hardcore Uproar's organisers in exchange for letting them feature a recording of the crowd at one of their nights in the track. Symbolically, according to Together member Suddi Raval, the night they attended to acquire the recording also turned out to be the final event under the Hardcore Uproar banner before its founders were forced to disband and stop the raves by the police. A slogan associated with these events and the anti-establishment ethos behind them, "High On Hope", was later used on a 1991 release on Blackburn-based label All Around the World, aptly under the artist name Hardcore Uproar. Later English hardcore introduced sped up hip-hop breakbeats, piano breaks, dub and low frequency basslines and cartoon-like noises, which has been retrospectively called 'old skool' hardcore (a.k.a. breakbeat hardcore) and is widely regarded as the progenitor of happy hardcore (which later lost the breakbeats) and jungle (which alternatively lost the techno style keyboard stabs and piano breaks).

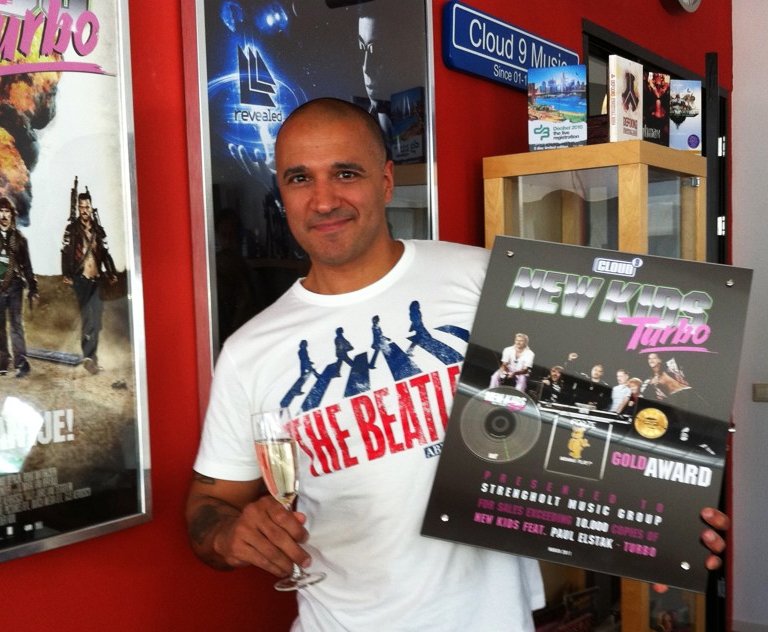
Paul Elstak, the founder of Rotterdam Records

An important event in the popularization of the genre occurred with the release of the 1990 track "We Have Arrived" by the German producer Mescalinum United, of Frankfurt. Trauner founded the label Planet Core Productions in 1989 and has produced more than 500 tracks, including 300 by himself until 1996. Another important project of Trauner was PCP, popularizing a slow, heavy, minimal and very dark form of hardcore that is now designated as "darkcore" or "doomcore".

In the United States, the New York pioneer of techno Lenny Dee launched the first dedicated hardcore record label Industrial Strength Records in 1991 that has federated a large part of the American scene, making New York one of the biggest centers of early American hardcore. Other American producers on the label included Deadly Buda and the Horrorist, but the label has also produced producers from other nationalities. At the same time in Rotterdam, the DJs and producers Paul Elstak and Rob Fabrie popularized a speedier style, with saturated bass-lines, quickly known as "gabber", and its more commercial and accessible form, happy hardcore.

Paul Elstak founded Rotterdam Records in 1992, which became the first hardcore label in the Netherlands. In 1992 at Utrecht, a large rave called The Final Exam led to the creation of the label ID&T. Launched in 1993, the concept of Thunderdome quickly popularized hardcore music in Europe with a catalogue of CD compilations and events, attracting thousands of young people that launched the gabber movement. Just during the single year of 1993, four compilations were released with increasing success. Many artists on the compilations have become well-known figures in the scene, notably 3 Steps Ahead, DJ Buzz Fuzz, The Dreamteam, Neophyte, Omar Santana, and Charly Lownoise and Mental Theo in the gabber/happy hardcore registry. The same year, the label Mokum Records was created by Freddy B who had success with artists and groups like Technohead Tellurian, the Speedfreak, Scott Brown, and the Belgian musician Liza N'Eliaz, pioneer of speedcore.

Around 1993, the style became clearly defined and was simply named "hardcore", as it left its influences from Detroit techno.

In England, the members of the sound system Spiral Tribe, including Stormcore, 69db, Crystal Distortion and Curley hardened their acid-breakbeat sound, becoming the pioneers of the "acidcore" and "hardtechno" genres. In 1994, they founded the label Network 23 which among others has produced Somatic Responses, Caustic Visions and Unit Moebius, establishing the musical and visual basis of the free party rave.

Hardcore/Gabber clubs in Belgium, DJ Yves was resident DJ at Club X in Wuustwezel and from the Hardcore room of the Cherry Moon in Lokeren, DJ Bass (DHT) was resident DJ of the Hardcore room of Temple Of House La Bush in Esquelmes (Pecq) and of La Florida in La Glanerie (Rumes) which is next to the Complexe Cap'tain. Thunderdome in Belgium was organized at the Antwerps Sportpaleis and in clubs such as the Planet Hardcore (Club) in Dendermonde 3 April 1994, the Extreme in Affligem on 16 December 1994, the Club X in Wuustwezel on 7 June 1996 and 13 September 1996, the Cherry Moon in Lokeren on 31 October 1997.

In France, the pioneers of hardcore include Laurent Hô and Liza 'N' Eliaz. The French hardcore scene later went on to develop into frenchcore.

In the late 1990s, hardcore progressively changed as gabber waned in popularity. This left a place for other hardcore-influenced styles like mákina and hardstyle.

=== 2000s ===
Under the influence of Hardstyle and industrial hardcore, a new scene was developing featuring DJ Promo and his label The Third Movement. This scene now known as mainstream hardcore emerged in the early 2000s with a modern, mature, slower, and sophisticated form. It was successful in Europe, especially in Netherlands and Italy, with producers and groups like Endymion, Kasparov, Art of Fighters, The Stunned Guys and DJ Mad Dog. Happy hardcore continues its movement underground and has evolved bringing out other related genres such as Eurobeat, UK hardcore, Freeform hardcore and Full-on Hardcore.

Labels such as Enzyme Records, Crossbones and Bloc 46 have produced darkcore artists, like Ruffneck, Fifth Era and The Outside Agency.

As the free party movement was successful in all the Europe, freetekno appeared. Numerous producers and labels emerged representing the hard techno and the frenchcore genres: Epileptik, Audiogenic, Les Enfants Sages, Tekita, Breakteam, Mackitek, B2K and Narkotek.

=== 2010s ===
The early 2010s saw the rise of hardcore internationally, with artists such as Angerfist gaining popularity quickly. The hardcore scene thrived during this period with many new producers and labels making their mark on the scene, both in Europe and the rest of the world, appearing even at North America's biggest music festival, Electric Daisy Carnival. In 2011, Angerfist entered the DJ Mag Top 100 at position No. 39.

The middle of the decade saw a shift in popularity, from mainstream hardcore to faster styles such as frenchcore, uptempo hardcore and terrorcore. Although these styles existed previously already, an increase in artists and events around 2015 helped these styles develop and move to the forefront of the audience's attention. The shift from the older range of 160–180 beats per minute to 200+ changed the hardcore market, creating a demand for more energetic and intense hardcore than before. Artists like Sefa & Dr. Peacock saw a quick rise within the scene and influenced the musical direction to a louder, faster, but more melodic and euphoric style. Major artists from other genres such as Marshmello, Carnage, Porter Robinson and Headhunterz started to occasionally play faster hardcore in their sets.

The end of the decade saw rapid growth of the hardcore scene in Europe. Hardcore festivals within the Netherlands saw a significant rise in attendance. 2019's edition of Thunderdome reached an attendance of almost 40,000 people and became the biggest hardcore event to ever take place. Regular large scale events hardcore started happening outside of the Netherlands in countries like Spain, Russia, Austria, Switzerland and the Czech Republic among other European countries. In America hardcore remains a relatively underground genre, but can be found in major cities being pushed by independent promoters and artists.

== Hard dance ==
Hard dance
- Stylistic origins: Eurodance; house; hardbag; hi-NRG; acid house; hardcore; breakbeat hardcore; hard trance
- Cultural origins: Late 1990s

Hard dance is an umbrella category of electronic dance music genres characterized by fast tempos and hard kick drums, but less harsh-sounding and often a bit slower than hardcore. The category includes hard house, hard trance, hardstyle, some forms of Eurodance and regional genres, such as mákina, lento violento and others. Sometimes the category has crossovers with hardcore genres such as frenchcore or UK hardcore. Despite this, the category is sometimes referred to as synonymous with hardcore techno music generally.

== Notable related events ==
- Defqon.1 Festival [nl]
- Masters of Hardcore [nl]
- Sensation Black [nl]
- Thunderdome [nl]
- Dominator Festival
- Darkside [UK]
- So W'Happy Festival [Belgium]

== See also ==
- Gabber
- Hakken
- Hardstyle
- List of electronic music genres
