= Masters of Hardcore =

Dutch hardcore music label

- Company type: Event
- Industry: Hardcore Music, Hardcore Music Events
- Founded: 1995
- Headquarters: Den Bosch, Netherlands
- Area served: Worldwide
- Key people: Matthijs Hazeleger, Eugenio A. Dorwart
- Website: mastersofhardcore.com

Masters of Hardcore is the name of a Dutch hardcore music label and of its related music festival events.

== Label ==
Masters of Hardcore music label was founded in 1995 in the Hemkade in Zaandam by DJ Outblast and King Matthew. Bass-D & King Matthew teamed up with other famous DJs like Paul Elstak and Buzz Fuzz.

== Events ==
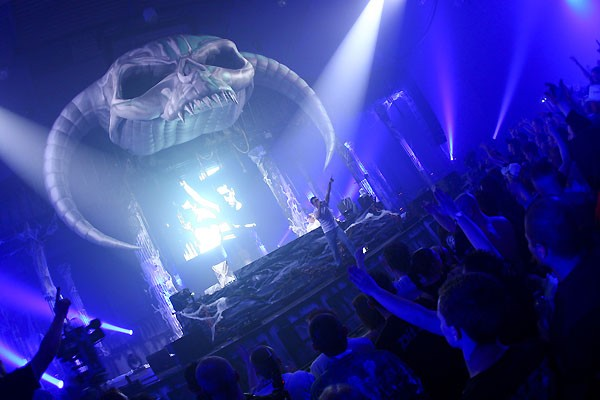
Masters of Hardcore - 15th Anniversary (2010)

In 1998, after a low profile period, the label Masters of Hardcore started to organize their parties as an independent and Bass-D & King Matthew decided to continue to produce Hardcore Music on the Masters of Hardcore label. Their first party was successful. Masters of Hardcore organized a lot of parties in big music festival locations in the Netherlands (the Beursgebouw in Eindhoven, and the PBH-Hallen in Zuidlaren). There also were parties in Germany (Dortmund Westfalenhalle, the event is called Syndicate now) and in Switzerland (different cities over the years).

== Anthem ==
- 2004 - Base Alert - Zoo (Netherlands, Beursgebouw Eindhoven)
- 2004 - Outblast feat. Korsakoff - Unleash The Beast (Netherlands, Thialf Stadion Heerenveen)
- 2005 - Angerfist - The World Will Shiver (Netherlands, Thialf Stadion Heerenveen)
- 2005 - Re-Style - Hardcore Psychopaths (Germany, Westfalenhallen Dortmund)
- 2006 - Bass-D and King Matthew - The Genesis (Netherlands, Den Bosch, Brabanthallen)
- 2006 - DaY-már - Embrace The Night (Germany, Westfalenhallen Dortmund)
- 2007 - The Stunned Guys - Raise Cain (Netherlands, Den Bosch, Brabanthallen)
- 2008 - Outblast - Infinity (Netherlands, Den Bosch, Brabanthallen)
- 2008 - DaY-már - Pole Position (Netherlands, Assen, TT Hall)
- 2009 - Catscan - Design The Future (Netherlands, Den Bosch, Brabanthallen)
- 2009 - Noize Suppressor - Pole Position Lap II (Netherlands, Assen, TT Hall)
- 2010 - Angerfist & Outblast - The Voice of Mayhem (Netherlands, Den Bosch, Brabanthallen)
- 2010 - The Stunned Guys & Amnesys - Symphony of Sins (Belgium, Hasselt, Ethias Arena)
- 2011 - Dyprax feat. MC Tha Watcher - Statement of Disorder (Netherlands, Den Bosch, Brabanthallen)
- 2011 - Angerfist - The Depths of Despair (Belgium, Antwerp, Loto Arena)
- 2012 - State of Emergency - The Vortex of Vengeance (Netherlands, Den Bosch, Brabanthallen)
- 2012 - Korsakoff - The Torment of Triton (Belgium, Antwerp, Lotto Arena)
- 2013 - Re-Style - The Conquest of Fury (Netherlands, Den Bosch, Brabanthallen)
- 2014 - Tha Playah feat. MC Tha Watcher - Eternal (Netherlands, Den Bosch, Brabanthallen)
- 2015 - Bodyshock feat. MC Jeff - Legacy (Netherlands, Den Bosch, Brabanthallen)
- 2016 - Miss K8 & MC Nolz - Raiders of Rampage (Netherlands, Den Bosch, Brabanthallen)
- 2017 - Destructive Tendencies - The Skull Dynasty (Netherlands, Den Bosch, Brabanthallen)
- 2018 - Angerfist & The Watcher - Tournament of Tyrants (Netherlands, Den Bosch, Brabanthallen)
- 2019 - N-Vitral & Sovereign King - Vault of violence (Netherlands, Den Bosch, Brabanthallen)
- 2020 - DJ Mad Dog & Dave Revan - Magnum Opus (Netherlands, Den Bosch, Brabanthallen)
- 2022 - DJ Mad Dog & Evil Activities - Immortal (Netherlands, Den Bosch, Brabanthallen)
- 2023 - Nosferatu - Cosmic Conquest (Netherlands, Den Bosch, Brabanthallen)
- 2024 - Deadly Guns & Tha Watcher - Time Heist (Netherlands, Den Bosch, Brabanthallen)
- 2025 - Angerfist & Nolz & Tha Watcher - Temple Of Resonance (Netherlands, Den Bosch, Brabanthallen)
- 2026 - D-Fence & Alee - Tides of Tyranny (Netherlands, Den Bosch, Brabanthallen)
