= Make 'Em Mokum Crazy =

Compilation album by various artists
- Released: 9 September 1996
- Genre: Happy gabba
- Length: 60:51
- Label: Mokum Records
- Producer: Various

Make 'Em Mokum Crazy is a compilation album of music by various artists released in 1996 by Dutch record label Mokum Records. The album, which consists solely of music from the label's catalogue, displays the happy gabba or "popcore" sound that had emerged from Dutch underground raves during the mid-1990s and had partly started to reach mainstream success, such was the case with the album's lead single "I Wanna Be a Hippy" by Technohead. Upon its release, the album received critical acclaim for its upbeat, manic tone and happy spirit. Robert Christgau named it the 53rd best album of 1997, and, as an example of its acclaim had continued over years, Rolling Stone named it the 30th greatest EDM album ever in 2012.

== Background ==
Dutch dance music record label Mokum Records was founded in 1993 by Freddy B. Originally releasing intense gabba music, such a "I'll Show You My Gun" by Annihilator, the label eventually started to release the lighthearted, "hilariously giddy" tone of happy gabba music over the ensuing two to three years. Happy gabba, and its darker originator gabba, have been described as taking "the sound of Dutch Nineties skinheads who liked their drugs speedy and their music even speedier." The label described the happy gabba music it released as "popcore", and its releases were popular in Dutch underground raves being held in warehouses. After the label had seen international success with "I Wanna Be a Hippy" by Technohead in late 1995 and early 1996, the Make 'Em Mokum Crazy compilation album was conceived by Mokum in attempt to document their catalogue and how the "popcore" sound was transitioning from its underground origins "to the top of the Euro pop charts."

== Music ==
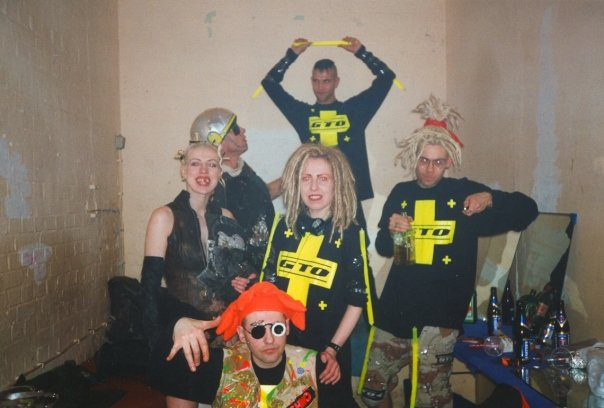
Technohead, pictured here in their Greater Than One days.

The liner notes of Make 'Em Mokum Crazy describe the music as "hyper speed happy anthems" and "the new sound of popcore", further noting that the songs emerged from the "underground warehouse raves of Holland." Music critic Robert Christgau described the music as "happy tunes" in "high registers that range from unnatural to very unnatural," advising listeners to "apply the broad brush it deserves and call it The Chipmunks Go Techno." Rolling Stone describe the album's happy gabber content as "hilariously giddy." More broadly, the Babysue zine described the music as "goofy techno."

Technohead's "I Wanna Be a Hippy", which was an international hit earlier on in 1996, quotes David Peel with its lyrics and features the lyrics "I wanna get stoned – on thuuuh marijuana" yipped by "a maniacal sprite." The song appears twice on the album, first in its original version and also with a remix by Ilsa Gold. Lollipop noted that the album "revolves around" the inclusion of "I Wanna Be a Hippy". Technohead also appear with the "Mobile Mecca Mix" of their song "Headsex" and with "Happy Birthday" which samples a Martin Luther King Jr. speech." Party Animals appear with a recording of the traditional "Hava Nagila" and a "ride-the-lightning cover" of "Have You Never Been Mellow" by Olivia Newton-John.

== Release and reception ==
Professional ratings
Review scores
Source	Rating
AllMusic	4/5 stars
Babysue	5/6
Robert Christgau	A−

Make 'Em Mokum Crazy was released in Holland by Mokum Records on 9 September 1996. Later on in 1996, the label released the album in the United States, where it was marketed by Roadrunner Records and distributed by RED Distribution, while Attic Records released the album in Canada. Modino Graphics are credited for the packaging's graphic design which features figure illustrations by Peter Conlon. The album was released to critical acclaim. Music zine Babysue described the music as "way upbeat and funny": "Techno bands take themselves way too seriously much of the time, but that's certainly not the case here. This almost sounds like techno/house music if it were combined with Saturday morning cartoons." AllMusic rated the album four stars out of five.

In The Village Voice, Robert Christgau rated the album "A−", indicating "the kind of garden-variety good record that is the great luxury of musical micromarketing and overproduction." He praised the good-spirited "idiotic" nature of the album and said that the album was "intensely irritating, perversely delightful, and (trust me on this) just the thing for a 12-year-old's coming-out party." He ranked the album at number 53 on the "Dean's List" of his favourite albums of 1997, curated for the annual Pazz & Jop critics' roll. Chuck Eddy of Spin magazine called the album "deliriously cute." In his 1999 book Generation Ecstasy: Into the World of Techno and Rave Culture, Simon Reynolds cited Make 'Em Mokum Crazy as key happy gabba release. Critical acclaim has continued to greet the album over time, and in 2012, Rolling Stone ranked the album at number 30 in their list of "The 30 Greatest EDM Albums of All Time", calling it an "insanely fun comp."

== Track listing ==
1. Technohead – "I Wanna Be A Hippy" – 3:17
2. Technohead – "Headsex" (Mobile Mecca Mix) – 5:08
3. Party Animals – "Hava Naquila" – 3:46
4. Party Animals – "Wapperdewap" – 1:37
5. Milk Bar – "Friday Night Can Kill Ya" – 4:17
6. Technohead – "I Wanna Be A Hippy" (Ilsa Gold Mix) – 5:22
7. Party Animals – "Aquarius" – 3:13
8. Back 2 Bass – "I Wanna Be With You" – 3:39
9. Soap – "Happy Tunes" – 3:31
10. Party Animals – "Have You Ever Been Mellow?" – 3:05
11. Technohead – "Happy Birthday" (Timitico's Party Blast) – 5:11
12. Search & Destroy – "Deep in the Underground" – 3:34
13. Wildchild – "All Together" – 3:25
14. Zieke House – "Loose Fragments" – 0:18
15. Back 2 Bass – "I Wanna Be With You" (Spoetnik Mix) – 5:43
16. DJ X-Play – "Dreams" – 5:43

The American version uses the "Flamman & Abraxas Radio Mix - Clean Version" of "I Wanna Be a Hippy" instead of the explicit original.

== Personnel ==
- Modino Graphics – design
- Peter Conlon – figure illustrations

== See also ==
- Happy gabba
