= La Chapelle wasteland =

Site associated with early French hip-hop

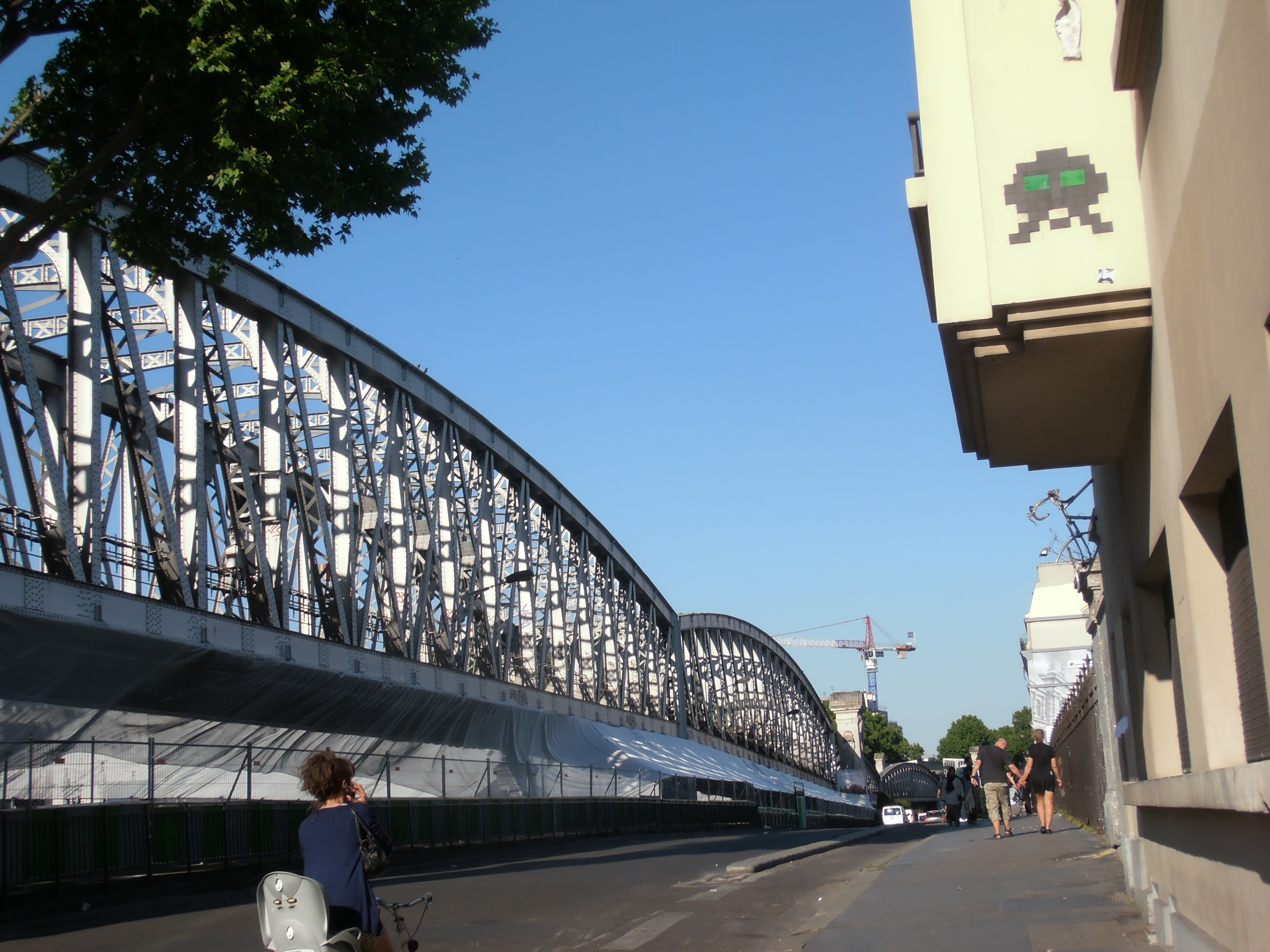
The elevated viaduct of Paris Métro Line 2 in the Quartier de La Chapelle (pictured in 2015); its route ran alongside the wasteland and made the murals visible to passengers

The La Chapelle wasteland (French: terrain vague de la Chapelle), also known as the Stalingrad wasteland (French: terrain vague de Stalingrad), was a disused plot of land in northern Paris, near the La Chapelle and Stalingrad metro stations, regarded as one of the founding sites of hip-hop culture in France.

In the mid-1980s, as media interest in the hip-hop movement was waning, the site became a major centre of Parisian graffiti, frequented by writers such as Ash, Bando and Mode 2, and eventually drew artists from several countries. In the summer of 1986, DJ Dee Nasty organised free jams there inspired by New York block parties, bringing together graffiti writers, dancers and rappers and drawing crowds of up to several hundred people, before the gatherings were banned by police in the spring of 1987. A mail-sorting centre was built on the site in the early 1990s. The wasteland occupies an important place in the memory of French rap, where it is often presented as the movement's birthplace.

== Background ==
In the mid-1980s, after the media enthusiasm generated by the television programme H.I.P. H.O.P., hosted by Sidney in 1984, hip-hop culture underwent a sharp decline in popularity in France. H.I.P. H.O.P. went off the air and the smurf dance craze came to an end. In 1986, promoters began turning down rap nights for fear of attracting an unruly crowd, and record supplies became scarce. Even Dee Nasty, despite his established reputation, found himself without a radio show or club night to host.

== History ==
=== A centre of graffiti ===
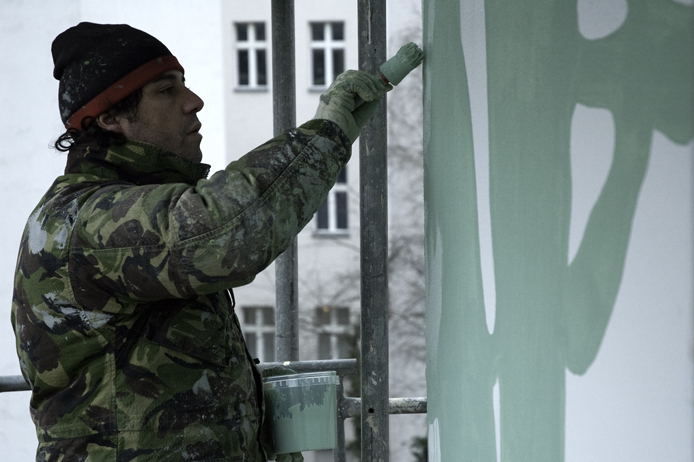
Ash, the first graffiti writer to work on the wasteland, photographed in 2008

Covering roughly 4500 m², the wasteland lay in northern Paris, within a block bounded by Boulevard de la Chapelle, Rue Philippe-de-Girard, Rue Jacques-Kablé and the railway tracks leading to the Gare de l'Est. Graffiti writer Ash, a member of the Bad Boys Crew (BBC), discovered the site by chance in 1985 from an elevated train and created his first pieces there, drawn by a setting that evoked, for him, the urban imagery of New York City.

The site's reputation grew once Bando made it his preferred spot, prompting writers to abandon the hoardings around the Louvre in favour of the wasteland. Enclosed by walls more than two metres high, it was largely hidden from the street but fully visible to passengers on Paris Metro Line 2, whose elevated section ran alongside it between the La Chapelle and Stalingrad stations, a factor that helped make it a site of observation and rivalry among writers. Writers who worked there included Lokiss, Mode 2 and JayOne.

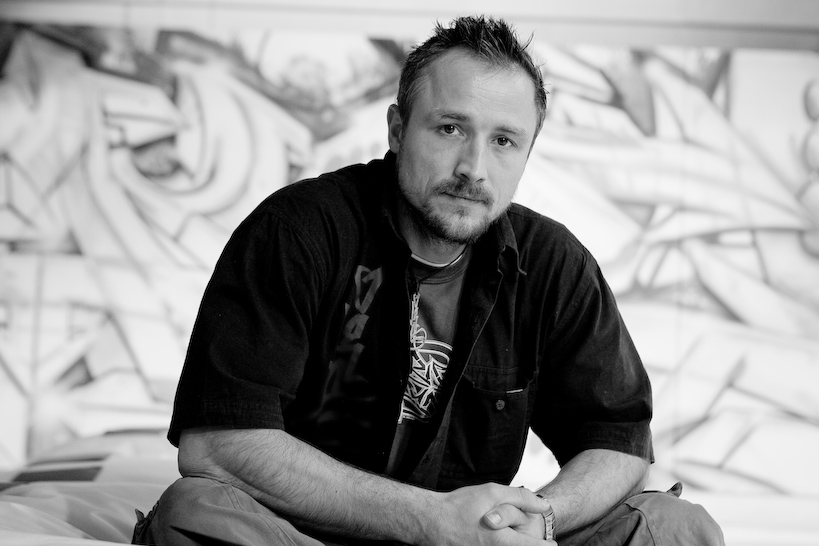
Darco, one of the artists who painted on the wasteland, pictured in 2006

After its discovery by the BBC, the site was taken up by the crews Crime Time Kingz and The Crime Gang (TCG). Bando painted a notable mural there titled Criminal Art. The wasteland became a major centre of Parisian graffiti, and according to Vincent Piolet, came to represent the endpoint of a route followed by most Parisian writers of the mid-1980s, who painted in succession along the banks of the Seine, the hoardings of the Louvre and the Arc de Triomphe du Carrousel, then those of the Centre Pompidou, before finally reaching La Chapelle. Writers such as Psyckoze and Darco tested their skills there.

From 1985 onward, the wasteland accumulated murals that became reference points beyond France's borders, eventually drawing graffiti writers from the United Kingdom, the United States, the Netherlands and Germany. In 1987, the book Spraycan Art by Henry Chalfant and James Prigoff featured work by Bando, Mode 2, Ash, Skki, Jay, Colt, Irus and Lokiss created at the site. Lokiss described the wasteland as the writers' "Art Gallery".

=== Dee Nasty's free jams ===
Returning from a trip to New York, where he encountered the local hip-hop scene and was named a Zulu King by Afrika Islam, DJ Dee Nasty sought to recreate in Paris a unifying event bringing together hip-hop's different disciplines. In the summer of 1986, he organised free jams inspired by New York block parties at the wasteland, together with DJ Jo. Dee Nasty set up a generator, two turntables, a mixer and speakers. He played records by Trouble Funk, Grandmaster Flash, Afrika Bambaataa and The Cold Crush Brothers brought back from the United States, while graffiti writers such as Bando, Colt and Sheek painted murals nearby. According to Dee Nasty, the set-up was improvised: a friend supplied the speakers, the generator was rented, and equipment was transported by scooter.

The gatherings took place inside a former, still-tiled factory building, whose floor was swept clean so that dancers could breakdance there. Word of the first session spread via the station Radio 7, and admission cost two francs. According to Dee Nasty, the earliest sessions mostly drew regulars of the wasteland, along with young people from the housing estates who were into rap, graffiti artists and breakdancers. The site became a weekly meeting point where dance crews such as the Paris City Breakers and Aktuel Force competed, and where rappers including Destroy Man & Jhonygo, Iron 2 and Lionel D performed. Initially, police tolerated the gatherings, which had the effect of driving drug users away from the site.

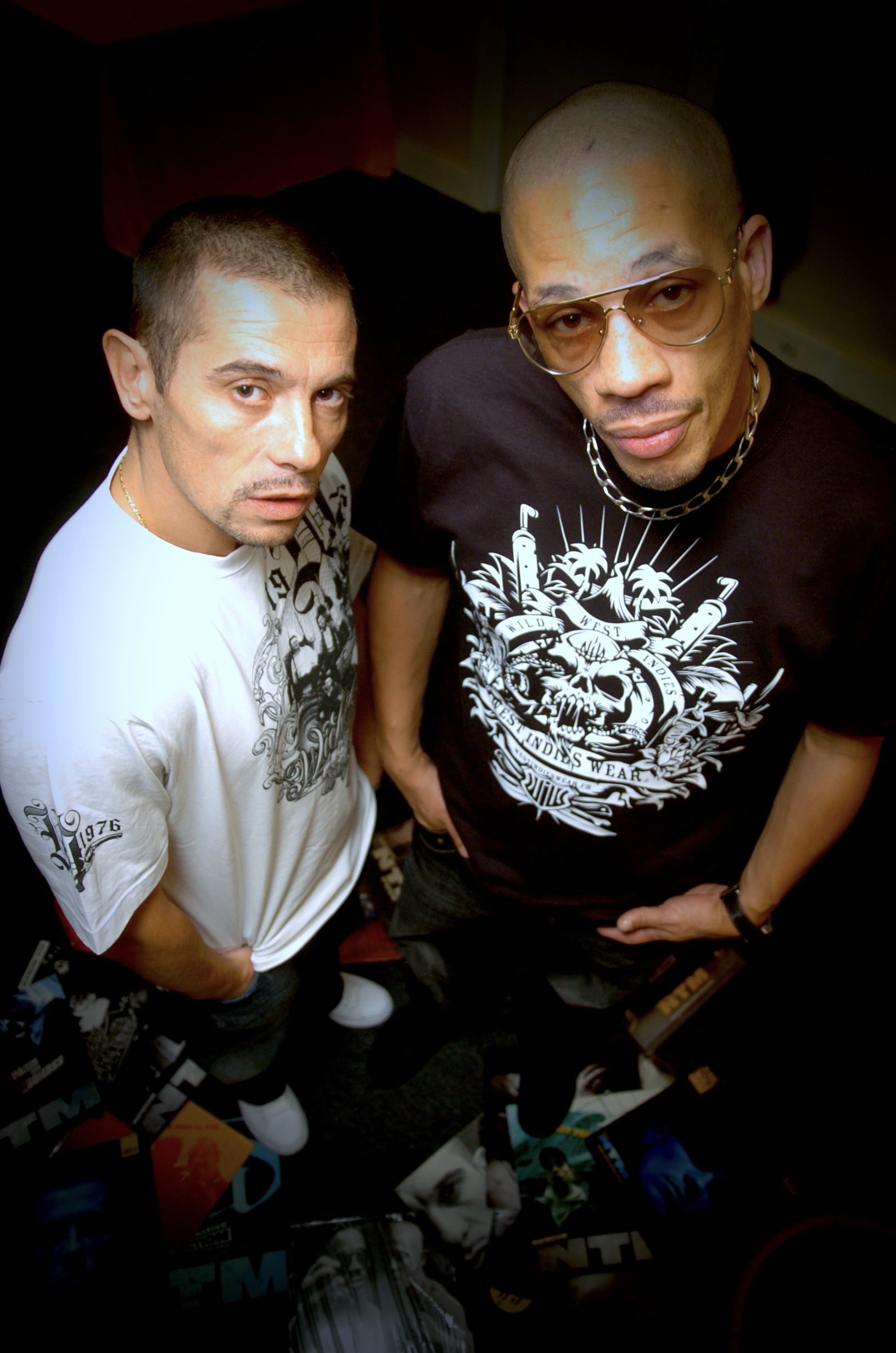
Kool Shen and JoeyStarr (pictured in 2008) are among the many figures of French rap who passed through the wasteland

Attendance grew week by week, eventually reaching 200 to 300 people. Even so, given the broader decline of the hip-hop movement in France, turnout at the wasteland remained far below that of the afternoon events previously organised by DJ Chabin at the Bataclan, which drew between 1,500 and 3,000 people until 1985. Nonetheless, the events allowed the French hip-hop movement to survive and made the wasteland one of the few Parisian sites where hip-hop culture could then be discovered. The site brought together, in a single location, figures who would go on to shape French hip-hop, including the future members of Suprême NTM and Assassin, as well as JonOne and Lionel D. Actor Vincent Cassel was also occasionally seen there. About ten free jams took place between August and November 1986, before the cold weather forced them to stop. When Dee Nasty attempted to organise further sessions the following spring, police banned them, surrounding the site and dispersing participants. Faced with the threat of a fine and confiscation of his equipment, Dee Nasty put an end to the gatherings.

=== Posterity ===
In the early 1990s, a postal sorting centre was built on the site of the former wasteland. Vincent Piolet notes that although short-lived, the free jams have remained in the collective memory of French hip-hop as a starting point for the movement. The wasteland is referenced by Suprême NTM in the 1995 track "Tout n'est pas si facile", which mentions "the early days from the La Chapelle wasteland".

== Analysis ==
Piolet connects the wasteland to the concept of the "Temporary Autonomous Zone" developed by anarchist writer Hakim Bey, while cautioning against an overly idealised image of the site, which was marked by strong rivalries between crews and occasionally violent confrontations, with the TCG crew positioning itself as an enforcer of graffiti's unwritten rules.
