= Rapattitude =

French hip-hop compilation

Compilation album
- Released: 28 May 1990
- Recorded: July–September 1989
- Studios: IRCAM, Paris
- Genre: French hip-hop
- Labels: Labelle Noir, Virgin
- Producer: Benny Malapa

chronology
Rapattitude (1990)	Rapattitude 2 (1992)

Rapattitude is a French hip-hop compilation released on May 28, 1990, on the Labelle Noir label, under license from Virgin. It was produced by Benny Malapa, and features several artists from the emerging Parisian hip-hop scene, including Assassin, Suprême NTM, Tonton David, Dee Nasty, Saliha, and EJM. The compilation was recorded largely at the IRCAM studios during the summer of 1989. It was the first French hip-hop compilation and received the first gold certification for a French rap album.

== Background ==
By the late 1980s, French hip-hop had been around for nearly ten years but remained largely ignored by the media. After that decade, it emerged from the underground to become part of the French music scene. Organizations like Radio Nova and events such as "Chez Roger Boîte Funk" at the Globo and "Zoopsie" at the Bobino took over from the "zulu parties" and the pioneers of the La Chapelle wasteland, while the record industry began to take an interest in the movement. Social worker Benny Malapa, who discovered hip-hop at the New York City Rap Tour in Pantin in 1982, worked in the late 1980s on a documentary about Black Parisian nightlife, Paris Black Night, produced by Yves Billon. Preferring to stay behind the camera, he enlisted Madj, host of the show Fusion dissidente on Radio Beur, which featured "dissident rock" and urban music. Filming was carried out with the help of Black Panther Djida, who served as his guide through the nightlife scene and helped him meet artists such as Daddy Yod, Pablo Master, and Saï Saï.

According to Malapa, it was at the Franc-Moisin housing project in Saint-Denis, following a discussion about the lack of a producer for these artists, that he decided to produce them himself. However, Madj credits himself with the idea for the format: he reportedly suggested to Malapa that they produce a compilation instead, a format inherited from punk that helped compensate for the limited repertoire of each artist, few of whom were then able to release a solo album. Christian Milia, for his part, traces the project back to his own exchanges with Madj. An initial attempt to organise a sound system party on Rue des Rosiers failed, which convinced Malapa that he needed to surround himself with a team. Madj then introduced him to Milia, his co-host on the radio. The meeting with sound engineer Sodi ultimately steered the project toward the compilation format.

== Production ==
Assassin was recruited by Madj; Suprême NTM was introduced to Malapa by Assassin's Rockin' Squat in early 1989. Djida and Saï-Saï brought in EJM; a sound system at the Lasson studio introduced Tonton David to Malapa; Black Panther Casa introduced him to New Generation MC and Roger RMC, who introduced him to Saliha. The participation of Dee Nasty, a leading figure in the scene, was deemed essential. The group A.L.A.R.M.E. was formed specifically for the compilation, centered around Mikey Mosman, bassist Nicolas Baby from Fédération Française de Fonck, and a backup singer from Magma, during a session at the IRCAM. Several absences were due to refusals or setbacks: Timide et Sans Complexe turned down a contract they deemed unfavorable, Lionel D's label opposed his participation, and neither Lucien Revolucien—who was in New York at the time—nor MC Solaar—who was contacted too late—could appear on the record. Malapa later acknowledged that it had been wrong to exclude Les Little.

The project's founders established the Labelle Noir label, whose name is a play on the expression "belle noire" (beautiful black woman). Its logo, depicting a Black female dancer, was designed by graffiti artist Mode 2. Cathy Malapa handled administration; Benny Malapa managed production and business matters; and Madj and Milia were in charge of artist relations and concert organization.

The IRCAM building, where most of the compilation was recorded in 1989

Due to budget constraints, the recording took place at night at the IRCAM studios, thanks to sound engineer Laurent Vanteau, between mid-July and September 1989. Dee Nasty's track, "Funk a Size," was, however, recorded in his home studio. After the sessions resumed during the winter, Adam Volny mixed the album in early 1990 in the basement of the Centre Pompidou. In his autobiography Mauvaise réputation (2006), JoeyStarr describes the sessions as clandestine, with the team sneaking in at night to avoid the security guard, while Malapa asserts that all necessary permits had been obtained and that the participants had access badges.

Disagreements quickly arose between Malapa, Madj, and Milia over the organization of concerts, particularly the Académie Fratellini big top concert in October 1989 and the French Rap Connection in December 1989, which resulted in a financial loss for Labelle Noir. The artists themselves split into three rival groups: the Mouvement Authentique (Saliha, New Generation MC, EJM), Assassin and Suprême NTM, and the Rasta artists (Tonton David, Saï Saï, Mikey Mosman, Daddy Yod). Malapa broke ties with Madj and Milia in December 1989; the protagonists' accounts of the causes differ, with Malapa citing mismanagement of the artists, while Milia accused Malapa of withholding information and conducting secret negotiations.

After being turned down by Bondage Records, Polydor, and EMI, the deal was finally struck with Emmanuel de Buretel of Virgin France, even as he was preparing a competing compilation of his own. According to Malapa, the arrangement took the form of a loan accompanied by an acknowledgment of debt rather than an advance. Milia also claims that de Buretel offered him the role of artistic director for the compilation, which he reportedly declined so as not to be dependent on Malapa. Malapa considers this account implausible: he would not have had the authority to offer such a position, as the compilation remained the property of Labelle Noir until its sale in January 1992 to Delabel, a label that de Buretel did not found until June 1991.

== Release ==
Rapattitude was released on May 28, 1990. NTM's track, "Je rap," was the group's first officially released song; Sheek, from the group Nec Plus Ultra—who had recorded a song of the same name released by Polydor in 1989—saw it as a mocking reference to his group. As the only woman on the compilation, Saliha was, according to Bettina Ghio, the first French female rapper to be recorded and released on a record. Tonton David's "Peuples du monde" became a hit, helped by a music video directed by Mathieu Kassovitz.

The compilation sparked competition among record labels to sign the artists individually: Labelle Noir signed Tonton David, while the others joined Virgin, Polydor, or Epic. Malapa failed to sign Assassin, as he was unable to match the offer made by Remark Records. The venture proved financially beneficial for Malapa's Labelle Noir, but was not very lucrative for the artists. Each group received 0.7% of sales, even though the compilation received the first gold certification for a French rap album. Sales estimates vary, ranging from 40,000 to 100,000 copies depending on the source.

A free concert held at Bobino for the Fête de la Musique in 1990 remains etched in the public's memory, particularly for Rockin' Squat's performance, but it was also marked by a physical altercation between Malapa and Suprême NTM. The compilation led to a tour in 1991.

Since Malapa had failed to register the name "Rapattitude" with the National Institute of Industrial Property, Milia prevailed in a legal proceeding concerning the trademark.

== Legacy ==
Rapattitude is often presented as the starting point of French rap. However, according to Vincent Piolet, this interpretation tends to overlook the preceding decade. Several of the featured artists had backgrounds in dance, graffiti, or tagging before they began rapping. In 2024, the webzine Abcdr du son deemed Rapattitude an essential work for historical reasons more than for its artistic qualities. According to the site, only a few of the ten tracks have aged well, while the artists' inexperience makes much of the record laborious to listen to decades later. According to Bettina Ghio, Saliha's "Enfants du ghetto" is the only track on the compilation to address a social issue, whereas songs like "Je rap" by Suprême NTM or "La formule secrète" by Assassin focus primarily on the genre's aesthetic. She also notes that this is the first instance of the term "ghetto" in French-language rap, a word that was later widely adopted to refer to the banlieues.

A second compilation, Rapattitude 2, was released in 1992, notably featuring a track by the Marseille-based group IAM. Unlike its predecessor, Rapattitude 2 was a commercial failure. In 2012, EMI released a three-disc box set titled Rapattitude. It did not include the entire 1990 album but added a selection of songs spanning two decades of French rap, accompanied by a book by Olivier Cachin featuring forewords by Akhenaton, Orelsan, and Oxmo Puccino, as well as a collection of archival photographs. This reissue was accompanied by a concert at the Nouveau Casino in Paris, featuring Assassin, Tonton David, EJM, Rocca, and Dee Nasty.

== Track listing ==
No.	Title	Length
1.	"La formule secrète" (Assassin)	4:57
2.	"Peuples du monde" (Tonton David)	3:38
3.	"Enfants du ghetto" (Saliha)	3:00
4.	"Rouleurs à l'heure" (Saï Saï)	3:35
5.	"Paris Black Night" (A.L.A.R.M.E.)	5:34
6.	"Je rap" (Suprême NTM)	3:47
7.	"Rock en zonzon" (Daddy Yod)	3:20
8.	"Élément dangereux" (E.J.M.)	3:47
9.	"Toutes les mêmes" (New Generation MC)	4:10

== Bibliography ==
- Abcdr du Son (2023). 1990-1999 : Une décennie de rap français (in French). Paris: Marabout. ISBN 978-2501179041.
- Cachin, Olivier (2006). Les 100 albums essentiels du rap (in French). Paris: Éditions Scali. ISBN 978-2-35012-061-4.
- Cléraux, Pierre-Jean; Piolet, Vincent (2020). NTM : Dans la fièvre du Suprême (in French). Marseille: Le Mot et le Reste. ISBN 978-2-36139-654-1.
- Ghio, Bettina (2020). Pas là pour plaire ! : Portraits de rappeuses (in French). Marseille: Le Mot et le Reste. ISBN 978-2-36139-226-0.
- JoeyStarr; Kool Shen (2019). Suprême NTM (in French). With Cachin, Olivier. Paris: Michel Lafon. ISBN 978-2-7499-4084-7.
- JoeyStarr; Manœuvre, Philippe (2006). Mauvaise réputation (in French). Paris: Flammarion. ISBN 978-2-08-068931-3.
- Piolet, Vincent (2017). Regarde ta jeunesse dans les yeux : Naissance du hip-hop français 1980-1990 (in French). Marseille: Le Mot et le Reste. ISBN 978-2-36054-360-1.
