= The Smurfs music =

Music from the universe of the Smurfs comics, TV series and films

Singles and full albums of original music for The Smurfs comics (started in 1959), cartoon series (1981–1989) and movies have been released in different countries and languages, sometimes very successfully, with millions of copies sold. Worldwide, more than 10 million CDs were sold between 2005 and 2007 alone.

== Music recordings ==
In general, there have been three eras in which Smurf music was very popular: the late 1970s, the early 1980s and the mid-1990s and later.

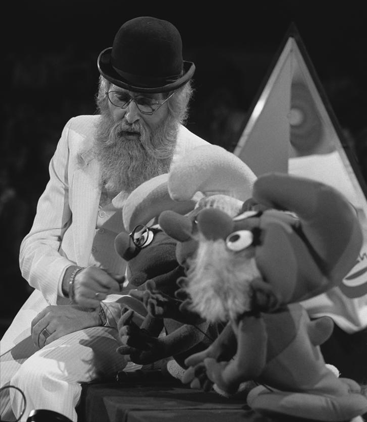
Father Abraham performing with Smurfs, 1983

The first successful Smurf record was "The Smurf Song" (originally titled "Het Smurfenlied" in Dutch) by Dutch singer, writer and producer Pierre Kartner, a.k.a. Father Abraham. The single, first released in November 1977, reached the #1 position in 16 countries. In the UK, it held the number-two position for six consecutive weeks in 1978. Kartner subsequently recorded different versions of the song in various languages, and released an album, Father Abraham in Smurfland, which sold 200,000 copies in Belgium and 300,000 copies in Netherlands.

In 1979, as work on a second Smurf album stalled due to creative differences between Mr Kartner and his record company Dureco, the latter – which owned the music rights to the Smurfs output – decided to take matters into its own hands and started releasing Smurf-related records produced by music promoter Frans Erkelens and composer Barrie Corbett (who had a European hit in 1975 with "If You Go" as half of the duo Barry & Eileen). Together, they produced numerous Smurf albums, some of which coincided with the Hanna-Barbera cartoon series of the early 1980s. Again, many of these albums were also released in other languages. In 1984, the album Best of Friends by The Smurfs – produced for the American market – received a nomination for a Grammy Award for Best Album for Children.

The third wave of Smurf mania occurred in the second half of the 1990s, and again had a Dutch link. This time it was Dutch production team Cat Music who were asked by EMI Music in the Netherlands to produce a Smurf album with "smurfed up" versions of current hits. The first single was a new version of the 2 Unlimited hit "No Limit", which took the top spot in the Netherlands in early 1995. Local branches of EMI in Europe requested their own Smurf albums (see below), all produced by Cat Music and mostly sung by local (uncredited) artists.

=== Czech Republic ===
A number of Smurf records have been released in the Czech Republic, first from 1988 to 1989, then between 1996 and 2000, and finally from 2011 to 2012. One of the albums, released in 1996, was the best selling album in the Czech Republic between 1994 and 2006.

=== Finland ===
Since 1996, EMI Finland has released a total of 19 Smurf CDs (mostly featuring "smurfy" versions of pop hits), with the first selling 170,000 copies in the country. One album has sold multi-platinum, another double-platinum, eight have sold platinum, and five have sold gold. One single has sold gold. Total certified sales exceed 800,000 copies.

=== Germany ===
Since the 1970s, many Smurf records have been made in Germany. Some of them became bestsellers, starting with the Father Abraham single "Das Lied der Schlümpfe" and the album Vater Abraham im Land der Schlümpfe, both of which went platinum. Apart from many later gold records, the Smurfs were again certified platinum for the 1981 album Hitparade der Schlümpfe, the 1995 album Tekkno ist cool (double platinum) and the 1996 Alles Banane volume 3, Megaparty volume 2 and Voll der Winter volume 4.

=== Hungary ===
From 1996 to 2011, fourteen "Hupikék Törpikék" (the Hungarian name for "The Smurfs") albums were released. The songs on these albums are covers of popular songs, performed in Hungarian, with lyrics related to the cartoon "The Smurfs".

=== Iceland ===
In Iceland, the first Smurf-themed record, a 4-track 12-inch EP, was released in early 1979. Three of the songs used melodies by Piero Barbetti, known to Icelandic children from the television series Mio Mao and Quaq Quao, and the fourth the melody of the children's song "Litlu andarungarnir", which is almost identical to the German Fuchs, du hast die Gans gestohlen. The record received considerable radio play, and was followed up in the same year by Haraldur í Skrýplalandi, an LP containing Icelandic versions of the songs by Pierre Kartner, which sold extremely well.

The name used for the Smurfs on both these albums was Skrýplarnir. This, however, clashed with Strumparnir, the name given to them in the Icelandic translations of the books, the first of which also appeared in 1979. Despite the popularity of the Skrýplar-titled albums, the name used in the books gradually won out, and is the one under which the Smurfs are now exclusively known in Iceland.

A Christmas album containing Icelandic versions of Smurf songs previously issued in the Netherlands came out in 1985, and its release on CD in 1994 marked the start of a minor Smurf frenzy. In 1995, the album from 1979 was re-released under the name Halli og Laddi í Strumpalandi, and the following two years saw the release of three albums containing new Smurf lyrics sung to the music of well-known international pop songs. The first of these, essentially an Icelandic version of one of the Norwegian Smurf albums, became that year’s bestseller.

=== Italy ===
In Italy, most of the Smurfs cartoon anthems were sung by Cristina D'Avena.

=== Japan ===
In Japan, "Silly Little Song of the Smurfs" (スマーフのちっちゃなちっちゃなうた, Sumāfu no Chiccha na Chiccha na Uta) was the opening theme song to the Japanese dub of the Smurfs television series. It was released on 45 vinyl by Polydor Records in 1981, exclusively in Japan. The song was written by Keisuke Yamakawa and its music is by composers Pierre Kartner, "Corbett", and "Linlee". It features vocals by Yoshio Maruyama and Masaki Kobayashi, credited as Blessing Four. Included on the back of the album were dancing instructions for a special Smurf dance.

=== Netherlands ===
The success of the Smurfs music in the Netherlands started with the Dutch artist Father Abraham, whose single 't Smurfenlied (The Smurf Song) stayed at number one on the Dutch charts for seven consecutive weeks, while the follow-up single Smurfenbier reached #5. More Smurf records followed over the next decades, with Irene Moors as one of the main artists. In 1995, three different Smurf albums went platinum: Smurf the House, Smurfen Houseparty, and the double platinum Ga je mee naar Smurfenland. The single "No Limit", based on the 2 Unlimited hit of the same name, also went platinum and topped the Dutch charts for six weeks in 1995.

=== Norway ===
In 1978, actor/comedian Geir Børresen recorded a Norwegian version of Father Abraham's "The Smurf Song", which went on to top the Norwegian singles lists for 7 weeks in 1978/79. The accompanying album, "I Smurfeland" became even more popular, and remained for many years the best-selling Norwegian album of all time (selling 270,000 copies), until being overtaken by Åge Aleksandersen's "Levva Livet" in 1984. Two sequel albums were released in 1979, and together the three albums sold 380,000 copies. One of the albums contains a song, Tullesang, which is performed to the tune of, and named after, The Silly Song from Snow White and the Seven Dwarfs.

=== Poland ===
Beginning in 1997, 14 Smurf albums called Smerfne Hity were released in Poland. The first album, released in 1997, sold quadruple-platinum and four others sold platinum. Nine albums were released over the first four years, achieving sales of over 1,160,000 copies.

=== United Kingdom ===
In the UK the Smurfs have had five Top 20 singles. The first was the #2 "The Smurf Song" in June 1978, followed by the #13 and #19 hits "Dippety Day" and "Christmas in Smurfland" in September and December of the same year. Eighteen years later they scored two Top 10 hits with "I've Got A Little Puppy" (#4) and "Your Christmas Wish" (#8) in September and December 1996. Their #4 hit was unusual in that it used the music of the song "I Want To Be A Hippy" by Technohead, the original having lyrics about drug usage and rave music.

In terms of albums they have had six Top 30 hits. The first, in November 1978 was Father Abraham in Smurfland which reached #19. Albums like Smurfing Sing Song (1980) and The Smurfs All Star Show (1981) had releases in the UK, USA, Canada and Australia but failed to chart the Top 30. After a wait for 18 years they had two Top 10's in 1996, The Smurfs Go Pop! (July, #2) and Smurf's Christmas Party (November, #8). February 1997 saw another #2 hit The Smurfs Hits '97 – Volume 1 and seven months later came a #15, Go Pop! Again. A greatest hits album in April 1998 broke into the Top 30 at #28.

== The Smurf dance ==
The Smurf is a dance that originated with the Hanna-Barbera cartoon.

The Smurf is mentioned in "The Frug", a song by the band Rilo Kiley. It appeared on both their debut album, The Initial Friend E.P., and on the soundtrack to the movie Desert Blue. The Smurf is also mentioned in "The New Style" and "Posse In Effect", songs by the band Beastie Boys on their album "Licensed to Ill"; in "Turn Me Loose" as recorded by the collaboration of Eminem and Limp Bizkit; and in the song "I'm Through With White Girls" written by Jim Diamond and recorded by the band The Dirtbombs. The rapper Nas referenced The Smurf in the song Made You Look, along with two other fad dances, (the Wop and the Baseball bat). That same Nas line was used in the song "88" by the rap duo The Cool Kids, which is also featured on the video game NBA Live 08. The band Flobots mentions the Smurf in their song "The Effect."

== Parodies ==
- Comedy band The Barron Knights' 1978 UK #3 hit single A Taste of Aggro, a medley of parodies, included a version of "The Smurf Song" featuring, in place of the Smurfs, a group of bank robbers from Catford who have escaped from Dartmoor Prison.
- In 1979 the pop impresario Jonathan King scored a minor hit single under the pseudonym Father Abraphart and the Smurps entitled 'Lick a Smurp for Christmas (All Fall Down)', a parody of Father Abraham and the Smurfs. The title of the song referred to the hoax story that some Smurfs toys had been painted using lead paint, and that young children had been falling ill from placing them in their mouths.
- Oasis refused permission for the release of the song "Wondersmurf", a parody of their song "Wonderwall."
