= Good Vibrations (Party Animals album) =

Studio album by Party Animals
- Released: 1996
- Recorded: GABB-A-RAMA, The Attic With Static, Studio Le Roy
- Genres: Gabber, happy hardcore
- Length: 71:07
- Label: Mokum Records
- Producers: Flamman & Abraxas

Party Animals chronology
| Good Vibrations (1996) | Party@worldaccess.nl (1997) |

Good Vibrations is the debut album of the Party Animals and was released in 1996.

The Party Animals made their introduction on the video for the single "I Wanna Be A Hippy" by Technohead. The clip featured three gabbers and a hippie. The producers Flamman & Abraxas discovered the four. Flamman & Abraxas remixed the single and because one of the original producers, Lee Newman, died shortly after "I Wanna Be A Hippy" became a hit, they decided to continue with the singers as a new group. Flamman & Abraxas saw a potential for opening the mainly underground scene of gabber with this group by making the sound more pop oriented and thus introducing the new genre to a mainstream audience.

The album mainly consists of cover versions of existing songs set in a fast gabber beat. The remade songs were not only pop songs, but included songs like Sarin which is based on heavy metal and Hakkefest which is based on "Steuermann, lass die Wacht!" from Wagner's Flying Dutchman with 200 bpm drums set underneath. The album turned out to be very successful in The Netherlands with their first singles peaking at number one which makes them the first Dutch act to do so The album was certified Gold and peaked at number 3 in the Dutch album charts.

== Track listing ==
- Party Animals - Good Vibrations (1996, CD) on Discogs

| # | Title | Length |
|---|---|---|
| 1. | "Aquarius" | 3:12 |
| 2. | "Hou Op!" | 4:43 |
| 3. | "Hajo, Hajo" | 0:58 |
| 4. | "Hava Naquila (Tekno Mafia Mix)" | 3:06 |
| 5. | "Vaag" | 4:24 |
| 6. | "Have You Ever Been Mellow" | 3:06 |
| 7. | "Wapperdewap" | 1:36 |
| 8. | "Used & Abused (Amnesia Mix)" | 5:20 |
| 9. | "Bureau Vis" | 0:25 |
| 10. | "Buddha Shop" | 3:28 |
| 11. | "Not So Good Vibrations" | 0:39 |
| 12. | "Sarin" | 5:06 |
| 13. | "Die Nazi Scum (Album Mix)" | 4:53 |
| 14. | "Hava Naquila (Radio Mix)]]" | 3:46 |
| 15. | "The Rhythm" | 4:39 |
| 16. | "Hakkefest" | 4:54 |
| 17. | "Have You Ever Been Mellow (Tekno Mafia Mix)" | 3:53 |
| 18. | "Mellow Mellow (130 MG Mix)" | 7:42 |
| 19. | "Opzij, Opzij" | 3:22 |
| 20. | "On the Left Side" | 1:41 |
