= Deadly Buda =

American musician and graffitist

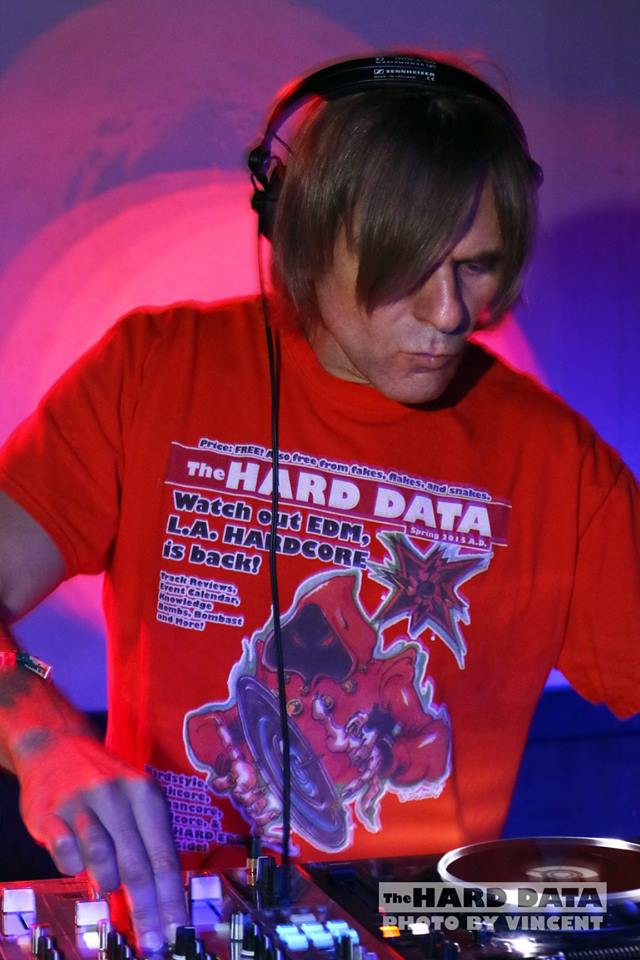
- DJ Deadly Buda performing at Trauma Live One Year Anniversary, Los Angeles, CA 2016

Background information
- Birth name: Joel Bevacqua
- Origin: Pittsburgh, Pennsylvania
- Occupation(s): DJ, producer, promoter, songwriter
- Labels: Sounds (Communique), Praxis, Level 2, Mokum, Fukem, Atomic Hardcore, Deadly Systems

Joel Bevacqua is an American rave DJ, music producer, promoter, and writer known as DJ Deadly Buda. He is also known as the graffiti artist “Buda.” Originally from Pittsburgh, Pennsylvania, he is credited by authors Roger Gastman and Caleb Neelon in their "The History of American Graffiti" as being "Pittsburgh’s first graffiti superstar" and inventor of the “monster rock style” of graffiti lettering. He is also recognized for instigating Pittsburgh's rave scene in 1991. In 2005 part of his techno dance music collection was a notable acquisition of the US Library of Congress: Motion Picture, Broadcasting and Recorded Sound Division.

== Graffiti ==
In 1985, Bevacqua chose the tag name “Buda” while doing a book report on Buddhism for a junior high school social studies class. He would frequently travel to New York City where he would meet and learn from graffiti artists at Henry Chalfant’s Soho studio at 64 Grand Street, like Tracy 168 and T Kid 170. Wanting to be better than anyone in New York, Buda developed a new lettering style he called “Monster Rock.” Most New York graffiti lettering styles were drawn in such a way as to give the illusion of 3-dimensionality. However the “3-D” as the graffiti writers called this illusion, usually only went in one direction, so that the letters looked like a cohesive block coming from a singular direction even when they were complex wildstyle letters. “Monster Rock” differed in that the “3-D” twisted and deformed in such a way as to make it appear that the letters were coming from different directions, as if it were a moving, organic form. The first appearance of the Monster Rock style was executed in Millvale, PA, and appeared in the book “Spraycan Art” by Henry Chalfant and James Prigoff. The style was influential to graffiti writers. Twisting “3-D” is now a common stylistic element of modern graffiti art.

== Rave promoter and DJ ==
On choosing the name "Deadly Buda", Bevacqua said that he wanted to capitalize on his graffiti notoriety, and at the same time sound like a kung-fu dj name like "Grandmaster Flash".

DJ Deadly Buda's first appearance occurred on December 13, 1991 in West View, PA (a municipality in the Pittsburgh metropolitan area) at the Psychotronic Slack Rave, which he co-promoted with the Slacker clothing store. He co-DJ’ed with DJ Controlled Weirdness from the United Kingdom. The two DJs would form the rave production group “Hear to Go” inspired by the Brion Gysin book Here to Go: Planet R-101. In 1992 he opened one of America's first rave record stores, Turbo-Zen Records. The record store would sponsor events such as Power Rave, Hi-Voltage and Soul. The flyer for Hi-Voltage, which was drawn and written by Buda and also printed on T-shirts, contained the quote "Technology must be used to liberate the individual." Dan Mross, the Bitcoin miner featured in the documentary "The Rise and Rise of Bitcoin" cites the quote as an inspiration that described his later interest in the Bitcoin technology.

== Writing and publishing ==
In the early 1990s, Deadly Buda began writing scene reports and record reviews for several popular rave fanzines, most notably the Brooklyn-based fanzine Under One Sky, published by Heather Heart, and was even quoted by Charles Aaron in the July 1994 edition of Spin magazine. His writing was also prominently featured in “Slurp!” a rave publication from Philadelphia. Other fanzines or magazines that he wrote for were: Alien Underground (UK) - which later became Datacide magazine, and who published his popular underground article “The Morphing Culture” which proposed a new classification of rave music. Milwaukee's “Massive” Magazine, Streetsound (Canada), Raveline (Germany), Freebase (Los Angeles), and Now?! (Pittsburgh).

Since 2015, Bevacqua has written several popular articles concerning hard electronic music and rave culture for the LA Weekly (online and print), insomniac.com, and The Hard Data (a website and print magazine that he began publishing in 2015). According to the LA Weekly website, some of his articles have gotten over 5000 Facebook shares. Some of the more popular articles have been: “Inside the World of the Kandi Kids, Dance Music's Most Colorful Subculture”, “Is America Ready for Rawstyle, the Hardest Offshoot of EDM Yet?”, and “10 Hardcore Techno Tracks for People Who Don’t Know Shit About Hardcore”.

== Music production ==
Deadly Buda's music has appeared on the following electronic music record labels. Sounds (a sub-label of Communique), Praxis, Level 2, Mokum, Fukem, Atomic Hardcore, and his own label, Deadly Systems. In 2017 Deadly Buda's track "King of Style" was released on Industrial Strength Records. The track and its video features audio and video samples from the hip hop documentary Style Wars.
