= Mode 2 =

Mode 2 may refer to:

- Term from the sociology of science, see Knowledge production modes
- Mode 2, electric vehicle charging protocol according to IEC 62196
- Acheulean, a Lower Palaeolithic archaeological industry
- Mode 2 (1967), a British graffiti artist and illustrator
