= The Smurfs Go Pop! =

Studio album by The Smurfs
- Released: 24 June 1996
- Genre: Comedy
- Label: EMI

The Smurfs Go Pop! is an album of songs by The Smurfs, released on 24 June 1996. Most of the songs are cover versions of existing songs with altered lyrics. Some of the songs function as simple Smurf sing-a-longs ("Smurfs are Back") while others have more of an apparent satirical intent ("The Noisy Smurf").

"I've Got a Little Puppy" was released as a single in the UK and reached number 4 in the Official UK Top 40 Single Charts in September 1996.

Versions of "Roll with It", "Wonderwall" and "Some Might Say" by British rock band Oasis were planned to be included on the album, but were refused by the band's parent record company Sony Music Entertainment. Oasis musician Noel Gallagher stated, "We hated the Smurfs as kids, I'm not letting a bunch of blue guys in white hats touch our stuff."

== Track listing ==
1. "Smurfs Are Back" – based on "No Limit" by 2 Unlimited. The repeated chant "no, no" from the original song is replaced with "yeah, yeah" leading to a climax of "Smurfs are back, yeah!"
2. "Mr Smurftastic" – based on "Boombastic" by Shaggy.
3. "I've Got a Little Puppy" – based on "I Wanna Be a Hippy" by Technohead. The high-pitched dance vocals of the original, containing blatant drug references, are replaced to comical effect with a more innocent tale about a dog. The high point of the remake is the refrain of "pooper, pooper scooper!"
4. "The Noisy Smurf" – based on "It's Oh So Quiet" by Björk. The alternating loud and soft vocals of the original are ideal for this tale of a noisy Smurf who pops up to disturb the peace.
5. "Find the Smurf" – based on "Love Is All Around" by The Troggs. The new version's lyrics bear almost no resemblance to the Wet Wet Wet hit, other than "We've looked all around" planted in the chorus.
6. "Smurfland" – based on 1972 song "Living Next Door To Alice" by Australian group New World. The song has been covered by a number of acts including Smokie and Roy Chubby Brown
7. "Our Smurfing Party" – based on "Saturday Night" by Whigfield.
8. "Don't Stop Smurfing" – based on "Don't Stop (Wiggle Wiggle)" by Outhere Brothers.
9. "Smurfhillbilly Joe" – based on "Cotton Eye Joe" by Rednex.
10. "We're the Smurfs" – based on "Alright" by Supergrass.
11. "Smurfland Olympics"- An original song about a Smurf sporting competition
12. "Smurfing Ways"- An original song/rap about how kind the smurfs are
13. "Mr. Blobby & the Smurfs" – based on "Mr Blobby" by Mr Blobby.
14. "Football Forever"- An original football anthem with no reference to Smurfs other than "it's a Smurfing good game" in the chorus
15. "Smurfing World"- An original ballad.

== Australian track listing ==
In 1997, EMI released the album in Australia and New Zealand, but with a somewhat different track listing:

1. "Smurfs Are Back"
2. "Mr. Smurftastic"
3. "The Noisy Smurf"
4. "Smurfin' Alive" – based on Stayin' Alive by the Bee Gees.
5. "Keep On Smurfing"
6. "Get Yourself Smurfing" – based on Naked by Louise.
7. "Dancing Queen" – a straight cover, with no altered lyrics, of Dancing Queen by ABBA.
8. "We're the Smurfs"
9. "True Blue" – based on MMMBop by Hanson
10. "Our Smurfing Party"
11. "Wannabe a Smurf Star" – based on Wannabe by the Spice Girls
12. "Roller Blade Smurfs"
13. "Football Forever"
14. "Ooh...Aah Smurf A Little Bit" – based on Ooh Aah... Just a Little Bit by Gina G
15. "Papa Smurf"
16. "Smurf Macarena" – based on Macarena by Los del Río
17. "31524" – based on 5-4-3-2-1 by Manfred Mann

== Reception ==
The album sold 200,000 copies within seven weeks of its release.

== Legacy ==
"Mr Smurftastic" and "The Noisy Smurf" appear as playable songs in the 2011 dance rhythm game The Smurfs Dance Party. "Don't Stop Smurfing" was originally planned to appear in the track list as well, but its choreography was instead used for an original song titled "Living Color" in the final game.

== See also ==
- The Smurfs music
