= Headsex =

Studio album by Technohead
- Released: 1995
- Genre: Hardcore techno, gabber
- Label: Mokum
- Producer: GTO

Headsex is the first album by Technohead, a pseudonym of the duo Greater Than One, released in 1995. It is the album from which the single "I Wanna Be a Hippy" was taken, which peaked at number six on the UK Singles Chart in February 1996. The song quotes several lines from artist/activist David Peel's song "I Like Marijuana"

== Track listing ==
1. "I Wanna Be a Hippy" (original mix) – 5:03
2. "Headsex (Let the Music Go)" (Nanotech mix) – 4:22 (vocals by Jessica Ogden)
3. "Accelerator #2" – 4:40
4. "The Passion #1" – 5:29
5. "Get High" (G.T.O. mix) – 5:19 (remix by GTO)
6. "Mary Jane" – 4:59
7. "Headsex" (original mix) – 4:19
8. "Get Stoned" (Carl Cox mix) – 7:08 (remix by Carl Cox)
9. "Keep the Party Going" – 4:24
10. "Sexhead" (Daz Saund & Trevor Rockcliffe mix) – 4:52 (remix by Daz Saund and Trevor Rockcliffe)
11. "Gabba Hop" – 5:04
12. "Kiddie Mix" – 4:11
13. "Headsex (Let the Music Go)" (Elvis Jackson radio mix) – 2:52 (remix by Elvis Jackson, vocals by Jessica Ogden)
14. "I Wanna Be a Hippy" (Flamman & Abraxas radio mix) – 3:35

== Charts ==
Chart performance for Headsex
Chart (1995)	Peak position
Australian Albums (ARIA)	169
Dutch Albums (Album Top 100)	48
