= Bunny Lake =

Austrian band

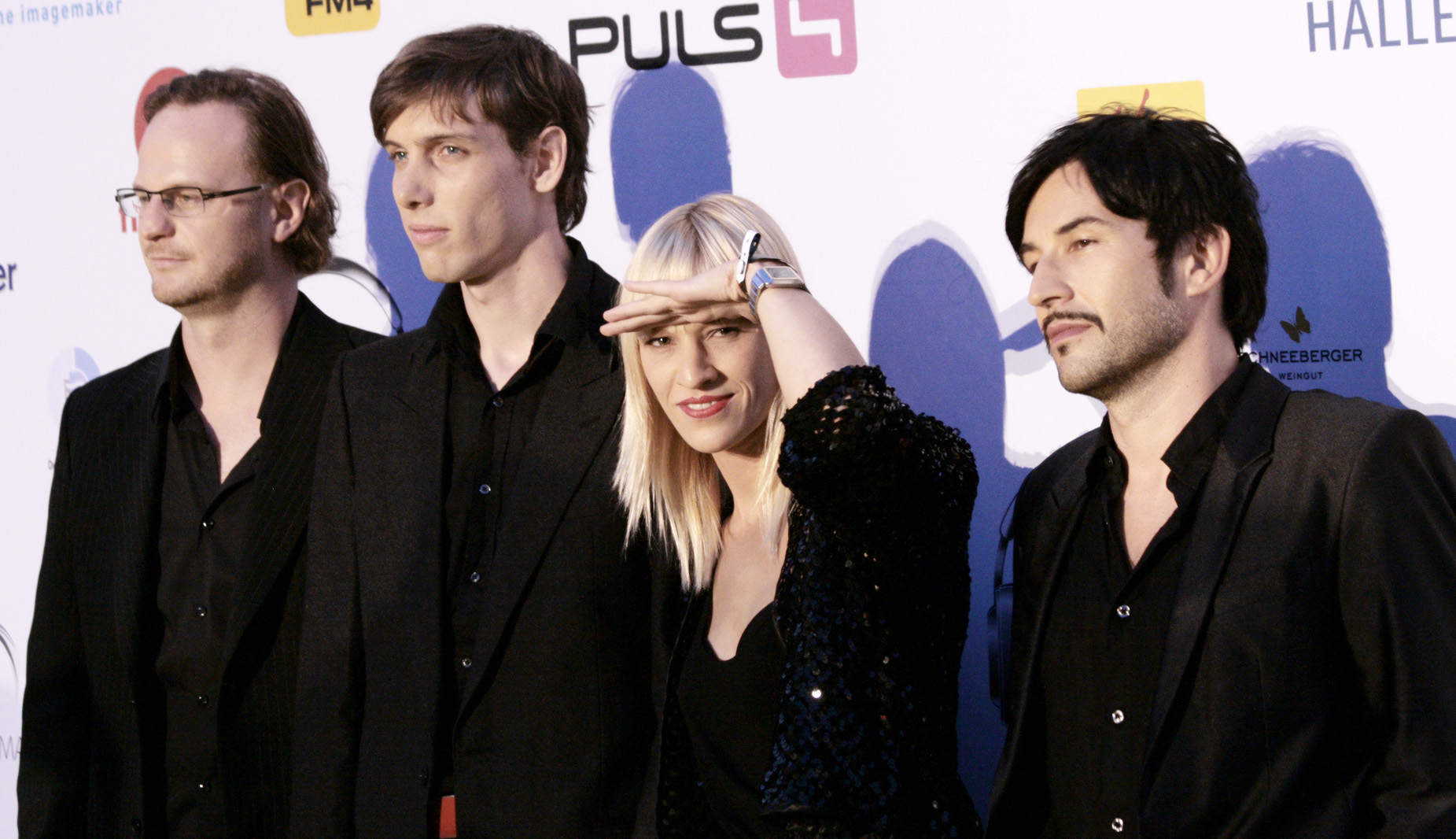
- Bunny Lake at the 2009 Amadeus Austrian Music Awards in Vienna on 10 September 2009. From left to right: Christof Baumgartner, Leonardo, Suzy on the Rocks, Christian Fuchs

Background information
- Origin: Vienna, Austria
- Genres: Electropop, New Wave
- Years active: 2004–2012
- Labels: Monkey, Klein, Universal
- Members: Suzy on the Rocks; Christian Fuchs; Bernd Heinrauch; Christof Baumgartner; Leonardo (live only)
- Past members: Dr. Nachtstrom
- Website: www.bunnylake.net

Bunny Lake was an Austrian electropop band from Vienna, formed in 2004. The band's name was inspired by Austrian director Otto Preminger's film Bunny Lake Is Missing (1965).

== History ==
Bunny Lake was founded in 2004 by singer Christian Fuchs and musician Dr. Nachtstrom. Fuchs had previously been active as singer and lyricist of cult industrial rock band Fetish 69 and was also responsible for the trip hop project Toxic Lounge. Both bands released several albums on various labels including Nuclear Blast and Klein Records. Dr. Nachtstrom had previously been working as an experimental electronic musician and produced several albums for Austrian avant-garde label Mego.

Singer Suzy on the Rocks and bassist Christof Baumgartner joined the band the same year. Bunny Lake's debut album, The Late Night Tapes, was released in 2006; it was produced by Viennese electro musician Gerhard "GD Luxxe" Potuznik. The album was described as "the soundtrack to an excessive night of partying in which euphoria can only be reached at the risk of a massive hangover the next morning."

The band's second album The Church of Bunny Lake (2007) was produced by Christopher Just (Kitsuné, Chicks on Speed). According to Falter, the album "fuses electronic dance music with the energy of rock 'n' roll." The remix of the track "Disco Demons" is especially acclaimed and makes the playlists of some of the most renowned DJs of the international club scene such as Ivan Smagghe, Mylo and Laurent Garnier.

A change into a new direction was signalled by the single "Into the Future", released in late 2008. The band's third album, The Beautiful Fall, was released on 19 March 2010.

In October 2014, Dutch Happy Hardcore group Party Animals (music group) did a cover of Bunny Lake's song '1994' and renamed it 'This Moment'. The song was accompanied by a music video. It is also included on their latest album 'Greatest Hits And Underground Anthems'.

== Visuals ==
According to the band their music is massively influenced by cinema, especially film noir and horrors film. It is therefore part of Bunny Lake's concept to support their live performances with elaborately edited visuals (provided by live member Leonardo), whose purpose is to highlight the imaginative and cinematic character of the songs.

== Music in other media ==
Bunny Lake's club hit "Disco Demons" was re-recorded by Fuchs and Suzy on the Rocks in Chinese for the 2008 compilation Poptastic Conversation China (which also featured Wir sind Helden, Die Ärzte, Die Sterne and other renowned acts), in close collaboration with Chinese DJ Pinie Wang. "Disco Demons" was also included on the soundtrack to the 2008 Austrian horror film In 3 Tagen bist du tot 2 by Andreas Prochaska.

Their song "She's on the Run" was used for the Turkish TV ad spot for Magnum ice cream. The lead was played by Josh Holloway, best known for his role as Sawyer on the TV series Lost.

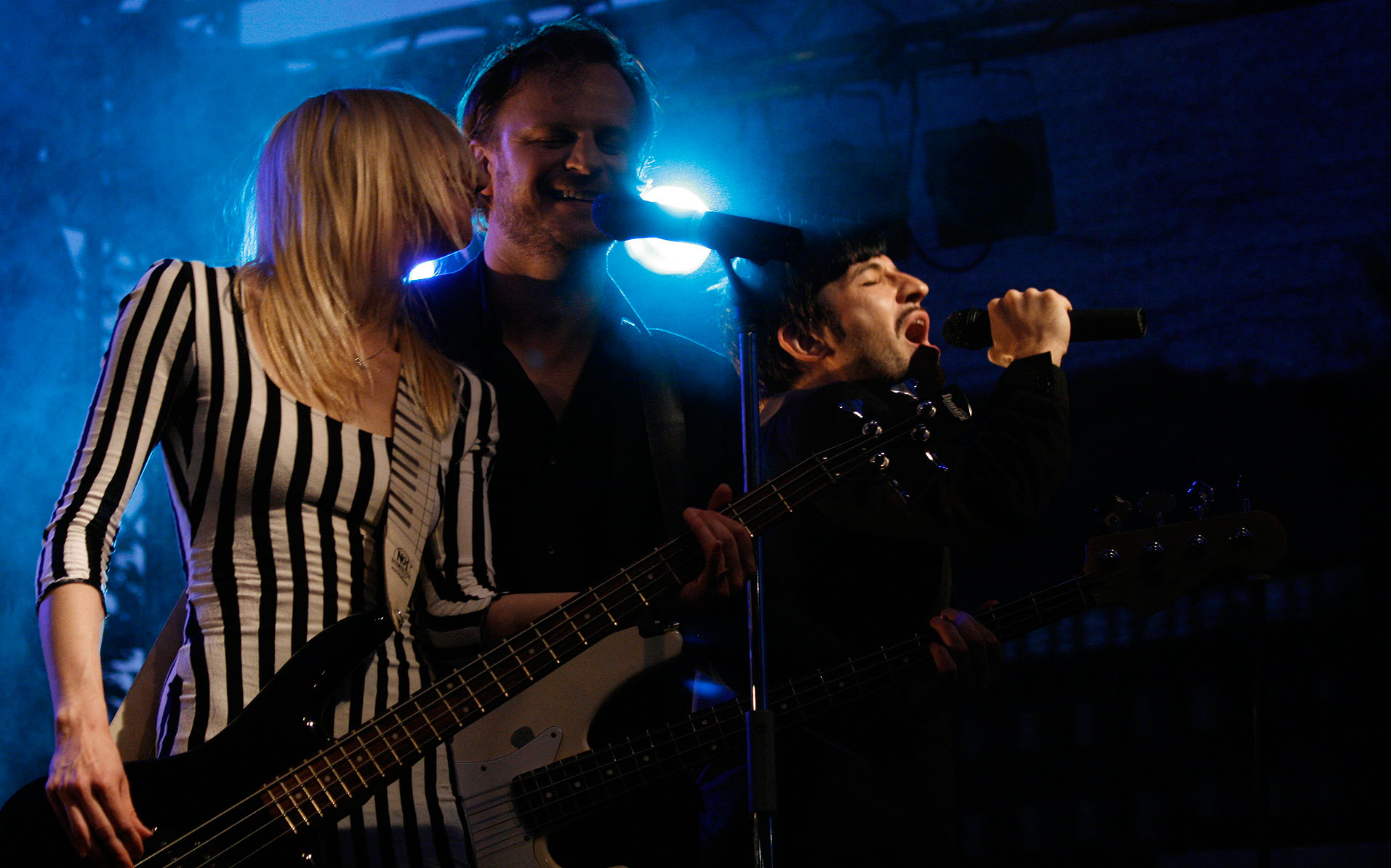
Bunny Lake

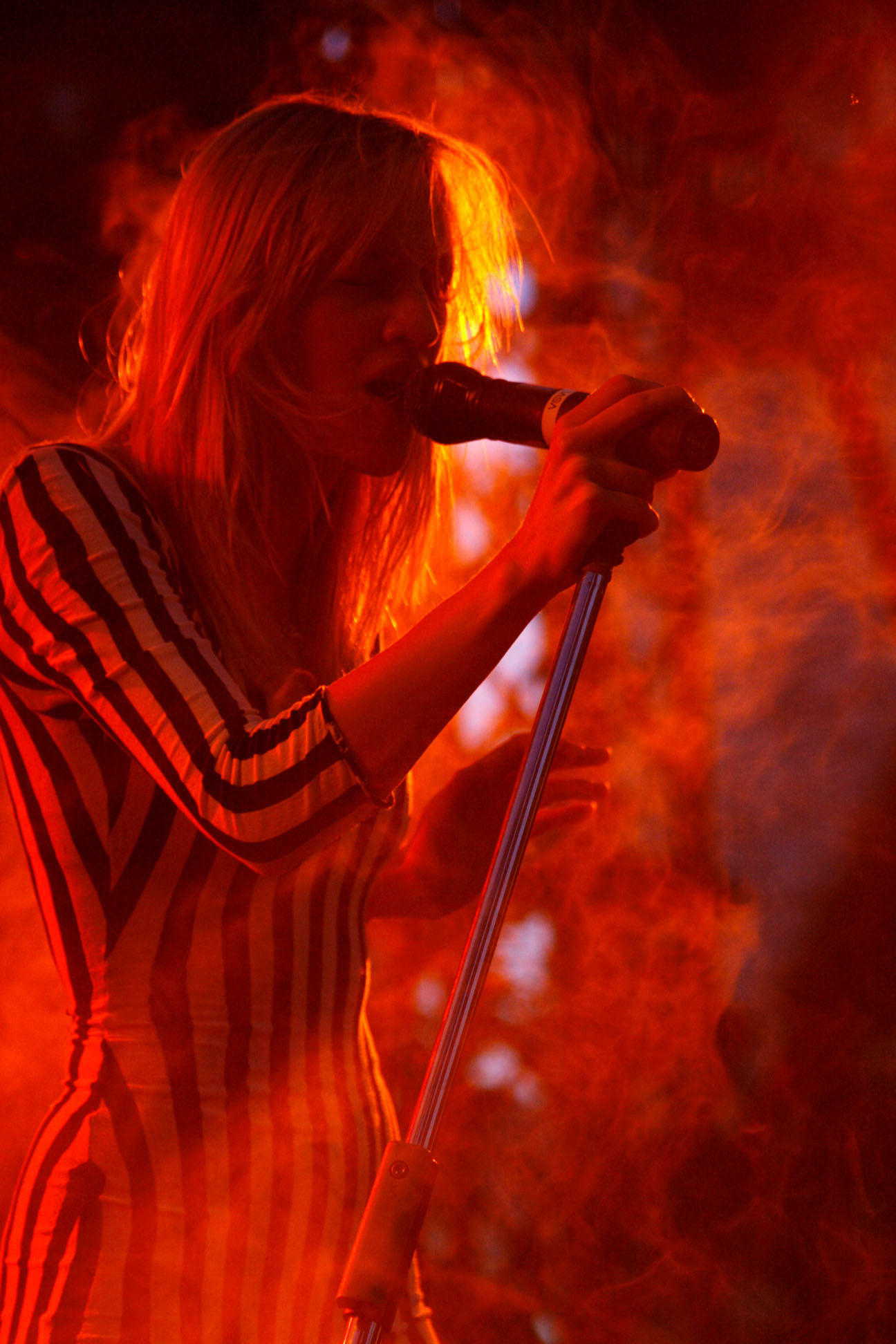
Suzy on the Rocks

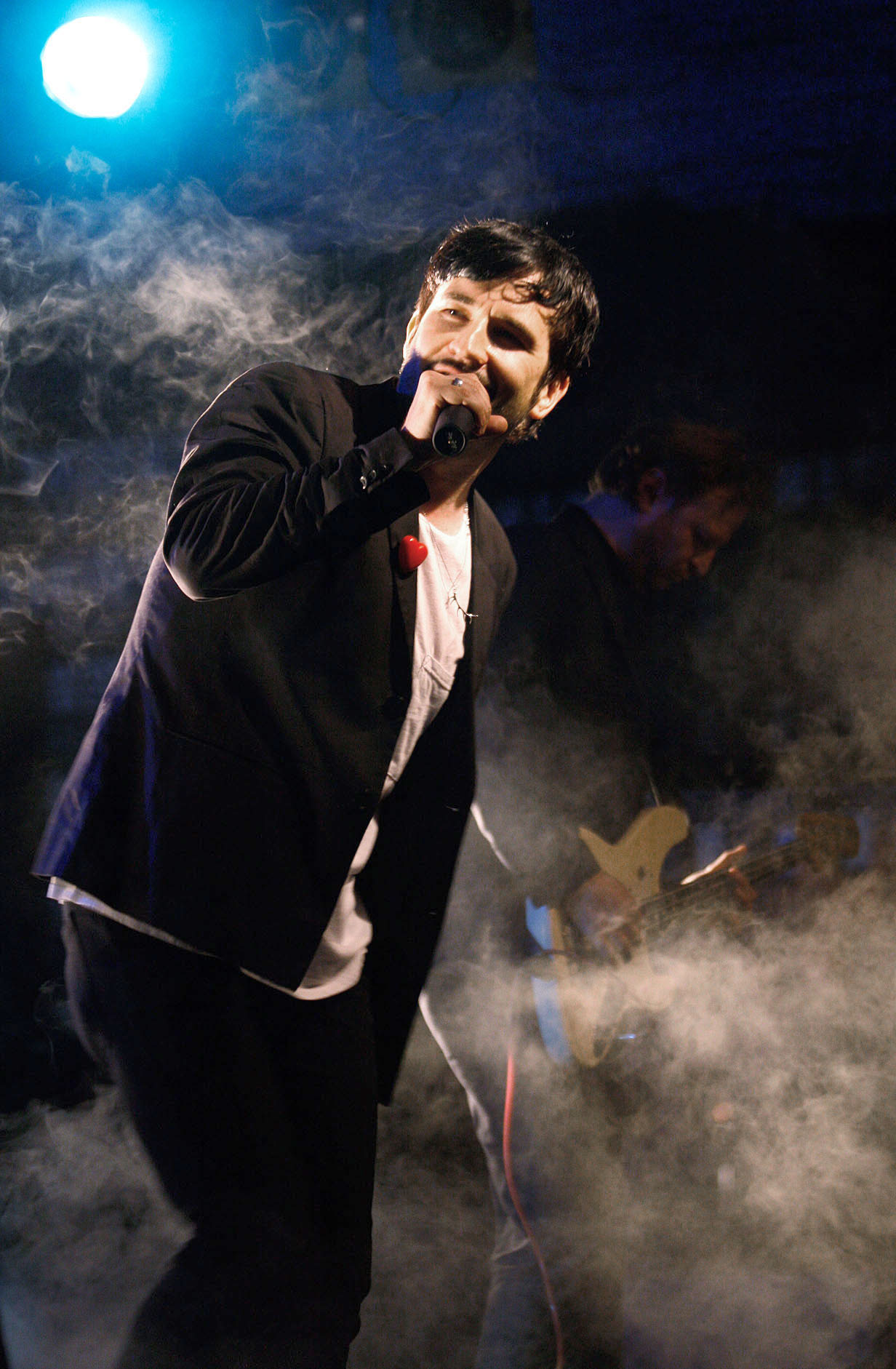
Christian Fuchs

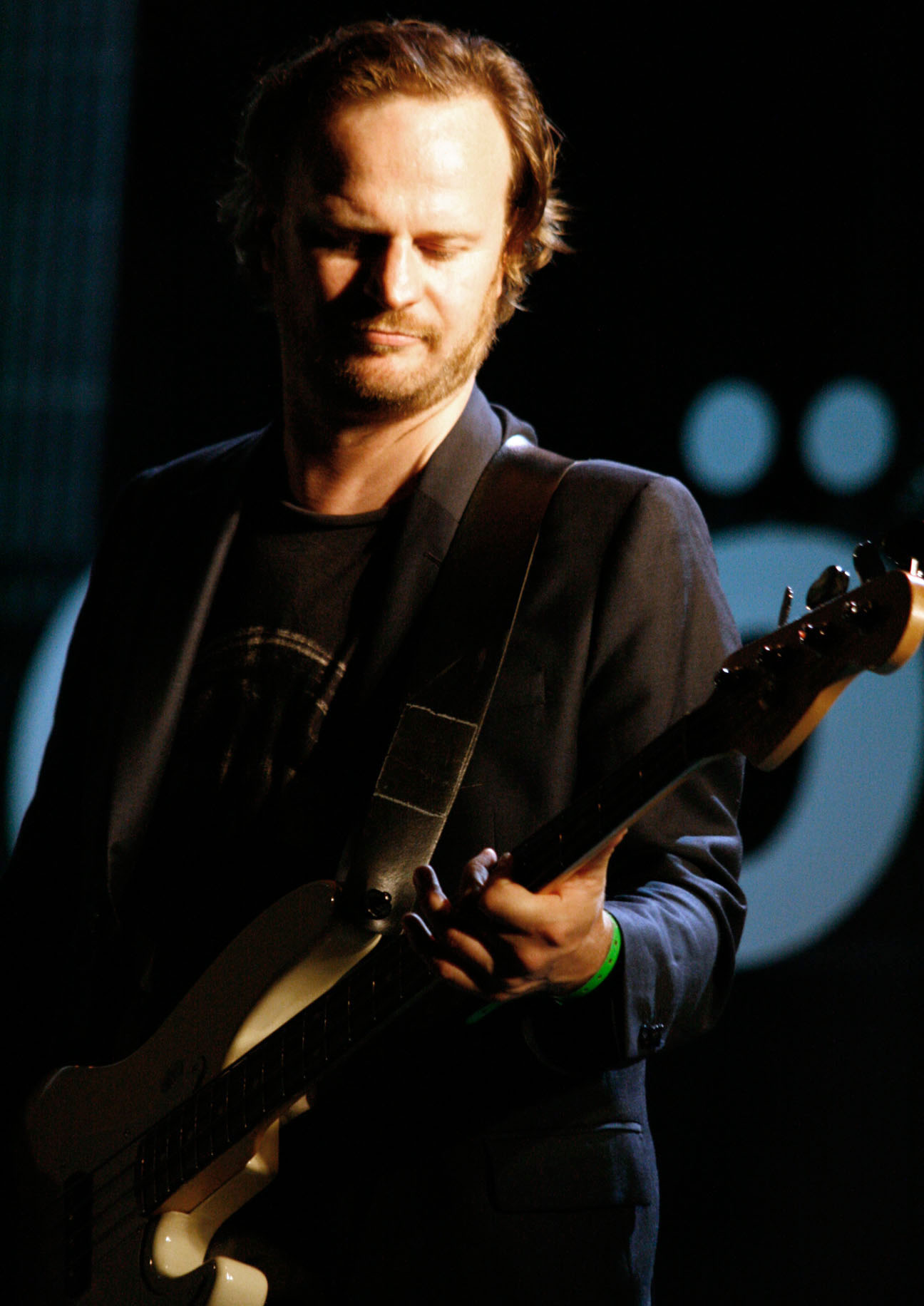
Christof Baumgartner

== Discography ==
=== Albums ===
- The Late Night Tapes (Angelika Koehlermann/Monkey Music, 2006)
- The Church of Bunny Lake (Klein Records, 2007)
- The Beautiful Fall (Universal Music, 2010)
- The Sound of Sehnsucht (Universal Music, 2012)

=== Singles ===
- "Disco Demons" (Klein Records, 2006)
- "Strobe Love" (Klein Records, 2007)
- "Into the Future" (Klein Records, 2008)
- "1994" (Universal Music, 2009)
- "Follow the Sun" (Universal Music, 2011)
- "Young Lovers" (Universal Music, 2011)

=== Music videos ===
- "All That Sex" (directed by Suk & Koch, 2006)
- "Strobe Love" (directed by Christian Fuchs and Michael Loizenbauer, 2007)
- "Twisted Forever" (directed by Edwin Brienen, 2007)
- "Into the Future" (directed by Mirjam Unger, 2008)
- "Follow the Sun" (directed by Paul Poet, 2012)
