= The Smurfs All Star Show =

Studio album by The Smurfs
- Released: 1981
- Genre: Comedy
- Label: EMI

The Smurfs All Star Show is a children's music album released in 1981. It contains several traditional tunes with modified lyrics, with reference to the world of The Smurfs.

== Track listing ==
Side One

1. The Smurfs All Star Show - Music: Alex Alberts / English lyrics: Linlee/Helna/Corbett
2. Welcome to Smurfland - Music: Pierre Kartner / English lyrics: Linlee, Corbett
3. Catch Me - Music: Steven Schoenzetter / English lyrics: Linlee, Corbett
4. Old Papa Smurf - trad./arr.: E. Mergency/Helna/ R. Klunz
5. Silly Shy Smurf - Music/Lyrics: B. Corbett/ J. de Piesses
6. Smurfing Land Express - Music: Pierre Kartner / English lyrics: Linlee, Helna, Corbett
7. Smurf a Happy Tune - Music: Pierre Kartner / English lyrics: Linlee, Corbett

Side Two

1. The Clapping and Jumping Song - Music and lyrics: B. Corbett/J. de Piesses/Helna
2. Yankee Doodle - trad./arr.: E. Mergency/ R. Klunz
3. London Bridge is Falling Down - trad./arr.: E. Mergency, R. Klunz
4. Smurfing Days - Music/Lyrics: B. Corbett/J. de Piesses
5. Space Smurfs - Music/Lyrics: B. Corbett, J. de Piesses, Helna
6. Rock-A-Bye Baby - trad./arr.: E. Mergency, R. Klunz

== See also ==
- The Smurfs music
