= Astronaut Cosmonaut =

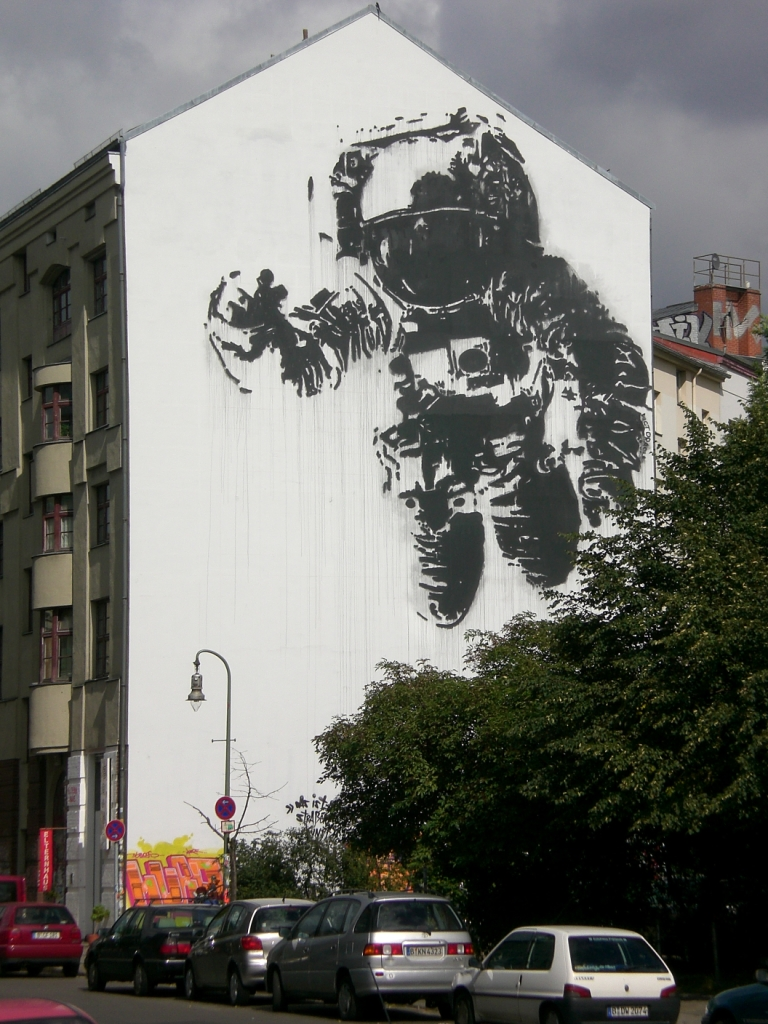
Astronaut/Cosmonaut mural by Ash

Astronaut/Cosmonaut is a mural by the French street artist Ash in the Kreuzberg district of Berlin.

It was painted in 2007 and measures 22x14 m. It is one of the most famous murals in Berlin and is considered a landmark and tourist attraction in Kreuzberg. It was made using a large stencil.

Originally, at nights, the Astronaut/Cosmonaut held a moving flag in his hand: it was a shadow of an actual flag, cast from the parking lot of a car dealership across the street, which does not exist anymore.

== Additional reading ==
- Mural Art, Kiriakos Losifidis, Publikat, 2008, ISBN 978-3-939566-22-9
