= Ash (artist) =

French street artist

Victor Ash
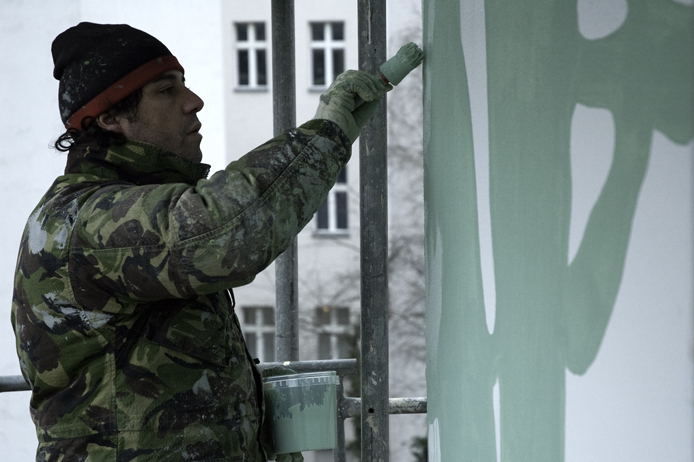
- Victor Ash painting in Berlin, 2008
- Movement: Street art, graffiti art
- Website: victorash.net

Ash in 2017 painting a roof in the Pantelimon neighbourhood of Bucharest with the Make a Point Collective

Victor Ash, also known as Ash, is a Copenhagen-based artist originally from Paris, France. Ash primarily works on canvas, lithography, and sometimes installations. He has exhibited regularly in various museums and galleries around the world since the late 1980s.

== Early career ==
Ash started his artistic career as a graffiti writer in the early 1980s. From 1983 to 1986 he also called himself Saho and Ash2. He was part of the Parisian graffiti collective BBC or Badbc, and was a contemporary of Bando, Mode2, and JonOne.

In 1989 The French fashion designer Agnès b. invited Ash, JonOne and several other graffiti artists to take part in the exhibition "Les peintres de la ville" at the Galerie du Jour situated in the neighborhood of Beaubourg in Paris. This was the first time Ash was showing his paintings inside a gallery.

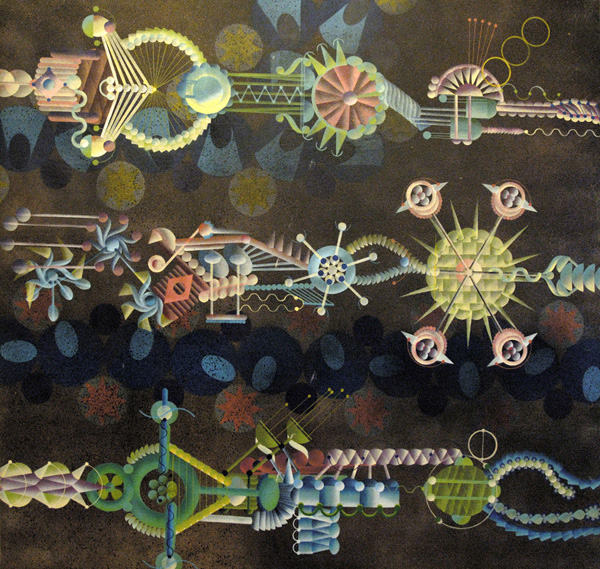
Victor Ash, Serie Rayons 1, spray paint on canvas 150 x 120 cm. 1993.

== Recent development ==
Ash's newest pieces are aesthetically very different from the graffiti he was painting in the 80s, and are a departure from the traditional graffiti styles of New York. Ash often uses the themes of contrast between the urban environments and nature and young people's quest for identity in subcultures.

Ash lives in Frederiksberg, Copenhagen, Denmark.

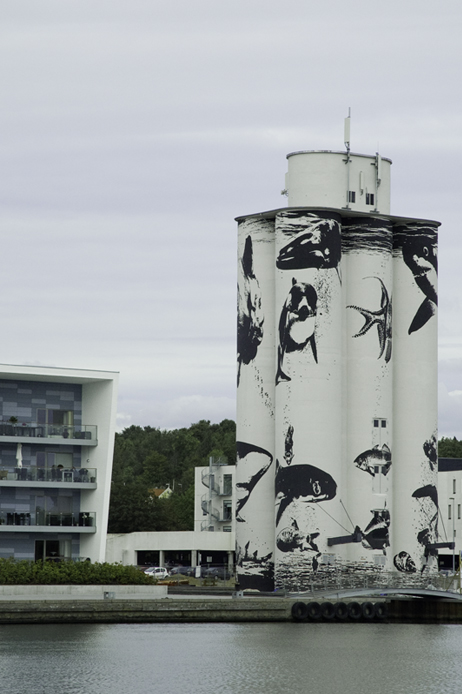
Victor Ash, Haderslev silo, Denmark 2013.

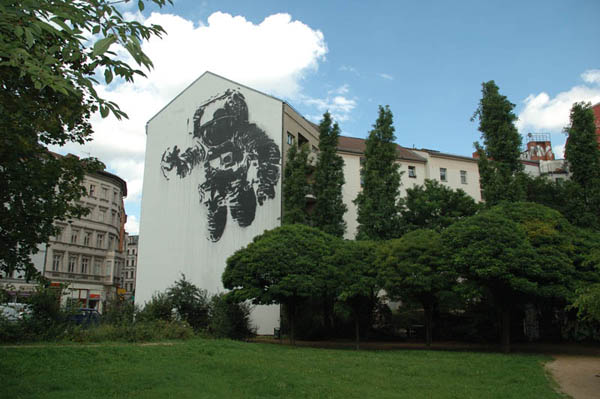
Astronaut Cosmonaut 2007, Berlin
