= Party Animals (music group) =

Dutch pop-gabber group

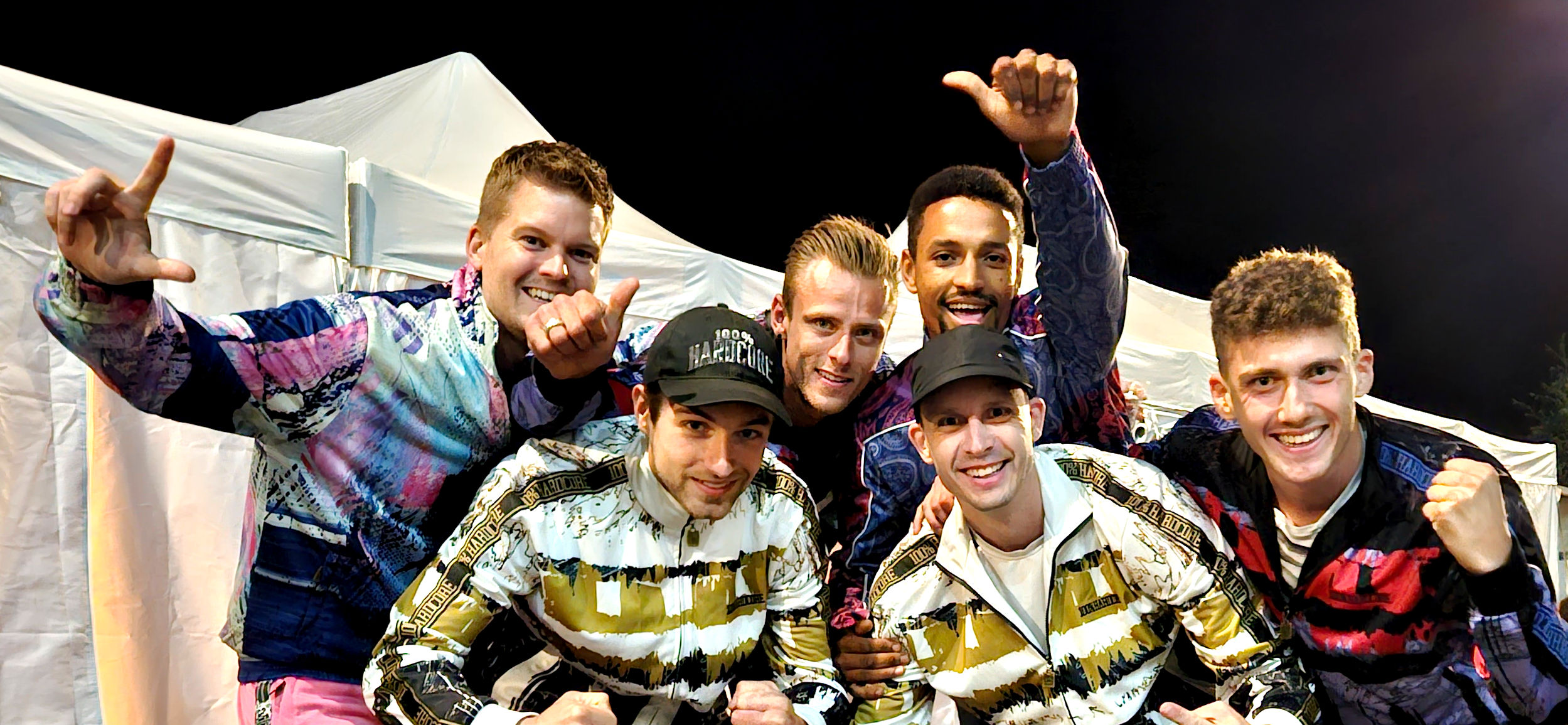
- Party Animals in 2023

Background information
- Origin: Amsterdam, Netherlands
- Genres: Happy hardcore Gabber
- Years active: 1995–2000, 2002–present
- Labels: Mokum Records, Lower East Side Records, Cloud 9 Dance
- Members: Jeroen Flamman; Jeff "Abraxas" Porter; Rick; Roderick; Tim; Dali; Martijn; Wesley
- Past members: MC Remsy; Evert van Buschbach; Patrick de Moor; Paul Grommé

Party Animals are a pop-gabber group from Amsterdam, Netherlands. The band was created by producers Jeff "Abraxas" Porter and Jeroen Flamman, also known as Flamman & Abraxas, along with vocalists MCs Remsy, Evert van Buschbach, Patrick de Moor, Dennis Adam, and Paul Grommé. They became the first act in the Netherlands to have their first three singles go straight to number one.

== Career ==
The Party Animals made their introduction on the video for the single "I Wanna Be a Hippy" by Technohead. The clip featured three gabbers and a hippie. Flamman & Abraxas discovered the four and saw a potential for opening the mainly underground scene of gabber by making the sound more pop-oriented and thus introducing the new genre to a mainstream audience.

The first single was "Have You Ever Been Mellow" which samples Olivia Newton-John's "Have You Never Been Mellow" The lyrics still contain parts of the original song with "Never" replaced by "Ever". Released in September 1995, it took three months before becoming a number 1 hit.

In 1997, Flamman & Abraxas formed a one-time spinoff group called the "Mini Animals", consisting of four boys aged 10 to 13. They only released one EP, titled "Get Up, Stand Up!" before the group disbanded. However, two of the Mini Animals, Youri and Jordi, would later officially join the Party Animals in 2002.

The group disbanded in 2000 after considerable success in the Netherlands and a hit in Hong Kong with "Atomic".

The group reunited in 2002 after they were re-discovered at a student party in Delft. After Jeroen Flamman discovered how popular the Party Animals' singles still were, he decided to revive the group. As a result, "Life Is Short" was released in 2002 and "Xanadu" followed in 2003. The group's fourth studio album, Gang of 4, was released in 2004.

In 2014, their fifth studio album, Greatest Hits and Underground Anthems, was released, which contained a new track titled "This Moment".

On 7 February 2016, Flamman & Abraxas posted several pictures of Suzanna Mangar (the vocalist on "Have You Ever Been Mellow", "Aquarius", and "Xanadu") on Facebook of her in the studio with the duo with the caption "Let's see if we can turn them into a new 2016 Party Animals track!"

== Members ==
=== Producers ===
- Jeff "Abraxas" Porter (1995-present)
- Jeroen Flamman (1995-present)

=== Animals ===
- Evert van Buschbach (1995–1997)
- David Adam (1995–1996)
- Dennis Adam (MC Remsy) (1995–1997, 2002–2004)
- Paul Grommé (1995–2000)
- Patrick de Moor (1996–1998)
- Robert (1996–2000)
- Michael (1997–2000, 2002–2009)
- Thijs Timmer (1998–2000)
- Youri (2002–2009)
- Jordi (2002–2010)
- Kenney (2004–2010)
- Martijn (2009–2014, substitute Animal)
- Kelvin (2010–2014)
- Eb (2010–2012)
- Jan (2009–2015)
- Patrick (2012-2023)
- Kevin (2013–2017)
- Wesley (2014-2023, substitute Animal)
- Bruce (2015–2017)
- Bonno (2017–2023)
- Bruce (2018–2023)
- Rick (2023-present)
- Roderick (2023-present)
- Tim (2023-present)
- Dali (2023-present)

== Discography ==
=== Albums ===
Date	Title	Dutch album chart	Certification
1996	Good Vibrations	3	Gold
1997	Party@worldaccess.nl	4	
1998	Hosanna Superstar	-	
2004	Gang of 4	50	
2014	Greatest Hits & Underground Anthems	98	

=== Singles ===
Date	Title	Chart	Comments
1995	"Have You Ever Been Mellow?"	1 (NL)	Gold in NL
1996	"Hava Naquila"	1 (NL)	Gold in NL
1996	"Aquarius"	1 (NL)	Platinum in NL
1996	"Buddha Shop"	N/A	
1996	"Misadventures Of The Spiegel Man Pt. 2"	N/A	
1997	"We Like to Party"	6 (NL)	
1997	"Atomic"	8 (NL)	
1997	"My Way"	19 (NL)	Cover of Sid Vicious' version of Frank Sinatra's classic
1998	"Whatever!"	35 (NL)	
1998	"Hawaii 5-0"	24 (NL)	
1998	"The Show"	21 (NL)	
2002	"Life is Short"	91 (NL)	
2003	"Xanadu"	10 (NL)	
2004	"Total Confusion"	92 (NL)	
2005	"Wazzup"	N/A	
2006	"Bad Boys/Animal Song"	58 (NL)	
2006	"PA Yeah!/How Do You Do?"	45 (NL)	
2008	"Electricity"	77 (NL)	
2009	"Do You Want To Hold Me"	N/A	
2009	"Fight For Your Right (To Party)"	N/A	
2012	"I Like Orange"	N/A	
2014	"This Moment"	N/A	Cover of "1994" by Bunny Lake
