= Lionel D =

French radio host (1961–2020)

Lionel Eguienta (December 23, 1961 – February 26, 2020), known by the stage name Lionel D, was a French radio host and rapper.

== Career ==
Although he released only one album (Y'A Pas De Problème; Squatt/Sony) in 1990 and three extended plays, he was considered as one of hip hop's—and more specifically rap's—pioneers in France, most notably alongside Dee Nasty, with whom he hosted Deenastyle in the 1980s, on Radio Nova.

== Death Rumours ==
For many years, he was rumoured to be dead, but an exclusive interview with him in iHH magazine issue number 5 (new formula of International Hip-Hop) released at the end of August 2016, revealed he was still alive and well at that time.
