= Mode 2 (graffiti artist) =

British graffiti artist and illustrator

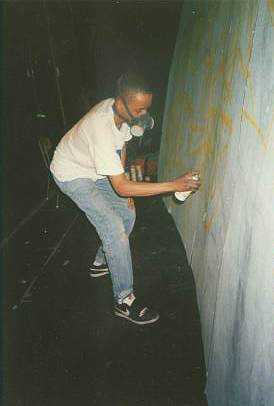
- Mode 2 painting on stage in Stockholm, 1989
- Born: 1967 (age 58–59); British Mauritius
- Movement: Hip-hop culture
- Website: mode2.org

Mode 2 (born 1967) is a British graffiti artist and illustrator. He became known in Paris from the mid-1980s for his lettering and characters, and is regarded as one of the major figures of Parisian graffiti. He has produced several record covers and logos for the French hip-hop scene.

== Biography ==
Mode 2 was born in Mauritius in 1967. His native language is French, and he learned English in school. After the independence of Mauritius, his parents kept their British passports; his father settled in England in 1973 and his mother in 1975, and he joined them in south London in 1976.

Influenced by the film Star Wars, Ralph Bakshi's film The Lord of the Rings and role-playing games, he taught himself through reading comics and science fiction. At the end of secondary school, he discovered the hip-hop scene in Covent Garden and, thanks to his drawing skills, painted canvases and customised his friends' jackets.

In late 1983, after reading an article in Sounds, he took up graffiti. He quickly established himself in this nascent world, moved on to spray paint and markers, and joined one of the first crews in the United Kingdom. He was noticed by the Parisian graffiti artist Bando, who had come to London to challenge the local taggers. Mode 2 then made his first trip to paint in France in May 1985.

He went on to become one of the most prominent figures in the Parisian graffiti scene, alongside Skki, Spirit, Psyckoze, Lokiss and Boxer. He co-founded The Chrome Angelz in 1985, of which he was a member alongside Bando, Pride, Zaki and Scribla. After several trips back and forth between France and England, he settled in Paris in 1987. That same year, one of his works appeared on the cover of Henry Chalfant's second book, Spraycan Art. He was a member of the 93 NTM crew. A lover of both hip-hop music and hip-hop dance, he drew inspiration from the artists of this movement and participated as a graffiti artist in battles and other gatherings across Europe and beyond until 1989. He then accepted numerous commissions to support himself, which gave him the opportunity to experiment with new painting techniques. Introduced to Pierre Buffin, a computer-generated imagery specialist, he was hired at his company BUF Compagnie.

In 1990, together with Jean-Baptiste Mondino, he designed the cover of the first French hip-hop compilation Rapattitude. He also designed the logo for the group Suprême NTM, the Nèg' Marrons, and later the Saïan Supa Crew. He carried out several commissions for the latter group. In 2001, he designed the spring–summer press and point-of-sale graphic campaign for Carhartt. He also took part in the Battle of the Year, an annual international breakdancing event, for which he created all the promotional visuals and on whose committee he sat, conducting research into the evolution of the discipline. During the 2020s, he lived in Berlin.

== Work ==
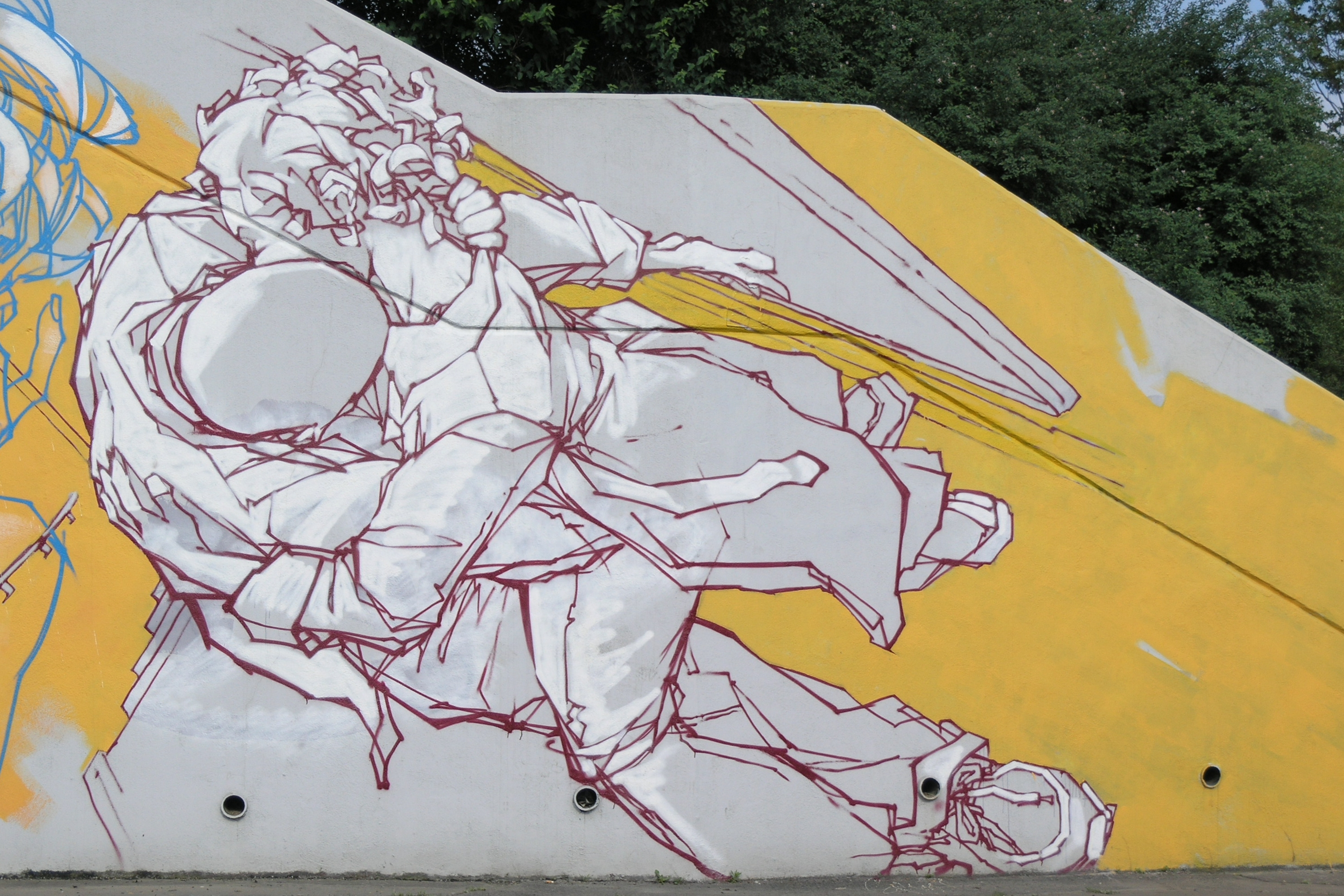
Detail of a graffiti by Mode 2 in Prague, painted as part of the Names Fest 2008

Mode 2 draws his inspiration from hip-hop and graffiti. The characters, which appeared in his earliest murals, are a recurring theme throughout his work; he is known for regularly depicting women in his art. During the 2000s, he used pencil, acrylic paint and, increasingly, the computer to create more detailed illustrations.

During the 2010s, he created fewer works on the streets than before, but his graffiti, like his emblematic characters, appeared on increasingly large canvases in cities and galleries. Some of his works are exhibited in museums. He seeks to convey the dynamic energy of graffiti lettering, as well as that of the dancers and hip-hop artists with whom he identifies. Most often made on canvas, paper or cardboard, his works retain the spirit of his early days, but, for health reasons, he is using spray paint less and less.

== Bibliography ==
- Ben Yakhlef, Tarek; Doriath, Sylvain (1991). Paris tonkar (in French). Florent Massot. ISBN 978-2-908382-09-9.
- Blondeau, Thomas (2016). Hip-hop: Une histoire française (in French). Tana. p. 191. ISBN 979-10-30101-39-3.
- Catz, Jérôme (2014) [2013]. Talk About Street Art. Groupe Flammarion. p. 256. ISBN 978-2-08-020196-6.
- Chalfant, Henry; Prigoff, James (1987). Spraycan Art. London: Thames & Hudson. p. 96. ISBN 978-0-500-27469-9.
- Hyland, Angus; Bell, Roanne (2003). Hand to Eye: A Survey of Contemporary Illustration. Laurence King Publishing. ISBN 9781856693394.
