= Have You Ever Been Mellow =

Single by Party Animals

from the album Good Vibrations
- Released: 20 January 1996
- Genre: Happy hardcore; gabber
- Length: 3:06
- Label: Mokum Records
- Producers: Flamman & Abraxas

Party Animals singles chronology
"Have You Ever Been Mellow" (1996)	"Hava Naquila" (1996)

Music video
- "Have You Ever Been Mellow" on YouTube

"Have You Ever Been Mellow" is the first single of Dutch pop-gabber group Party Animals and was released on their debut album, Good Vibrations (1996). The track was released in January 1996 by Mokum Records and became their first number one hit in the Netherlands. It contains a sample of "Have You Never Been Mellow" by Olivia Newton-John. The chorus was also reused except that "never" was replaced by "ever". Musically, the song is totally different with a fast gabber beat. It made the 1996 yearlist at a #21 position. The single was certified Gold. "Have You Ever Been Mellow" remains an often requested song in the Netherlands and reached the 35 position at 3FM's 90s Request Top 100 of 2006. It was a minor hit in the United Kingdom but, like other songs in its genre, sold better in Scotland.

== Critical reception ==
Richard Smith from Melody Maker wrote, "'Have You Ever Been Mellow' is wa-wa-wa-wa nosebleed gabba that gallops along at a hundred zillion beats per second. Party Animals' Jeff and Jeroen are basically Fierce Ruling Diva, the dutch hardcore duo who practically invented the genre." Music Week gave the song three out of five, adding, "The happy hardcore track with helium hooks was a minor hit in May but, after gaining considerable support on The Box, should be big this time." Pan-European magazine Music & Media commented, "This producer duo, which scored a major club smash with 'Rub It In' a few years ago under the Fierce Ruling Diva name, now switches disguise in order to try its hand at a hard-hitting happy house version of the pop classic first made famous by Olivia Newton-John, which should increase their mainstream appeal."

== Track listing ==
#	Title	Length
1.	"Have You Ever Been Mellow? (Flamman & Abraxas radio mix)"	3:07
2.	"Used & Abused (Amnesia mix)"	5:21
3.	"Have You Ever Been Mellow? (Tekno Mafia Mix)"	4:36
4.	"E.H.B.O."	5:10
5.	"Gabber Baby" featuring Het Amsterdams Gabberkoor	3:10

== Chart ==
=== Weekly charts ===
Chart (1996)	Peak position
Netherlands (Dutch Top 40)	1
Netherlands (Single Top 100)	1
Scotland (OCC)	11
UK Singles (OCC)	43
UK Pop Tip Club Chart (Music Week)	38

=== Year-end charts ===
Chart (1996)	Position
Netherlands (Dutch Top 40)	31
Netherlands (Single Top 100)	21
