= James Prigoff =

American photographer, author, and lecturer (1927–2021)

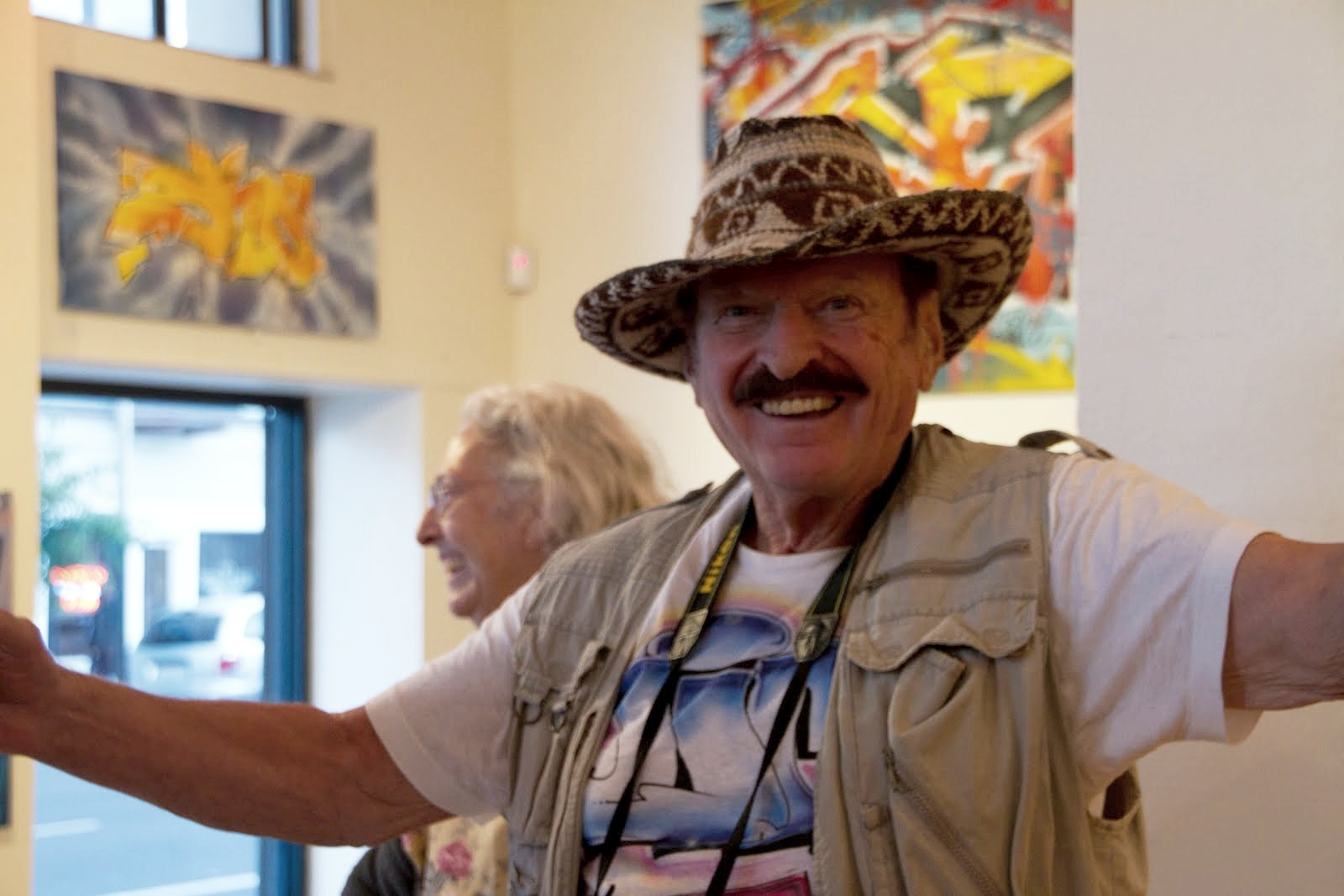
- Prigoff at the 1AM Gallery for the Classics, 2010, San Francisco, CA
- Born: October 29, 1927; New York City, U.S.
- Died: April 21, 2021 (aged 93)
- Known for: Photography
- Spouse: Arline Prigoff

James Prigoff (October 29, 1927 – April 21, 2021) was an American photographer, author, and lecturer focusing on public murals, graffiti, and spraycan art. He traveled extensively throughout the world documenting these art forms.

== Early life ==
Prigoff was born in Queens, New York City and grew up in New Rochelle, New York. He graduated from high school in 1944 at age 16. He was an Honorable Mention Westinghouse Science Talent Search winner, and was accepted at Massachusetts Institute of Technology (MIT) in Cambridge, Massachusetts. He was an honor student all eight terms and an outstanding athlete in track and field. He received a "STRAIGHT T", the school's highest athletic award.

Graduating MIT in 1947, Prigoff moved into the business world and also took up squash, achieving many national rankings. He was National Champion of Squash Tennis seven times in the 1960s. Prigoff was elected to the Explorers Club in New York City in 1967. In 1975, his name was included in a listing of 250 outstanding graduates of MIT.

In the late 1970s, he worked with Mark Rogovin and Marjorie Benton, founders of the Peace Museum in Chicago, and was an original board member for many years.

== Corporate career ==
In 1947, Prigoff was employed in the factories of Shawmut Inc. in Stoughton, Massachusetts. He moved into sales in New York City, and later become president of his division, which was sold to Genesco. He was employed by Genesco for two years before being recruited as executive vice-president of Rosenau Bros. in Philadelphia. In 1970, he was recruited to be president of the Sportco Division of US Industries, and in 1975, he was recruited to become senior vice president of the Sara Lee Corporation in Chicago. At both USI and Sara Lee, his challenge was to restore profitability to companies purchased by conglomerates that had little experience in the businesses they had purchased. After five years with Sara Lee, Prigoff was recruited to join Levi Strauss in San Francisco as president of one of their divisions. The task was the same: to bring profitability and stability to a division that had grown too fast. After three years with Levi's, Prigoff retired in 1984 at the age of 57.

== Historian, author, photography career ==
In the early 1970s, Prigoff became interested in documenting public murals. He was intrigued by their community nature, artistic merit, and ability to address issues that were not normally found in newspapers, television, and other media. He travelled extensively, amassing one of the largest documentations of this art form photographed by a single individual. Along the way, he noticed the appearance of graffiti in New York City and Philadelphia. He began to document that as well.

Prigoff noted the emergence of subway graffiti appearing "above ground", and was interested to see how it had spread across the country, and eventually worldwide. He wrote to his friend Henry Chalfant and suggested that he join Prigoff in tracking the art form around the world. Together they produced Spraycan Art, published in 1987. It sold over 250,000 copies, and is now considered one of the seminal books in the study of modern-day graffiti. Many graffiti writers learned about the art form from reading Spraycan Art, and initially perfected their skills by studying styles found in the book.

Prigoff later co-authored two books on traditional mural art with Robin Dunitz: Painting the Towns – Murals of California, and Walls of Heritage – Walls of Pride – History of African American Murals.

Prigoff has written forewords and assisted in the publication of several books on the subject of graffiti art. He has written articles for many publications, and his photographs appear in numerous publications and catalogues. The History of American Graffiti features 48 of Prigoff's photos, including its frontispiece.

In 2011, Jeffrey Deitch, director at the Geffen LAMOCA, curated the ground-breaking and record-attendance show Art in the Streets, with the help of Roger Gastman and Aaron Rose. Prigoff was one of a few photographers included in the show alongside eminent graffiti artists. Many of his photographs appeared in the catalogue.

In April 2012, the Estria Foundation honored Prigoff, along with Judy Baca and Kent Twitchell, with the award of "Urban Legend" Estria was quoted as saying, "James is considered one of the major forces in giving dignity and credibility to an art form that once was considered to be vandalism".

Over the years, Prigoff has exhibited his photographs in many cities, and has lectured around the world on the topic of public murals, graffiti, and spraycan art. He has also donated thousands of his photographs to historic archives.

== Personal life ==
Prigoff was married to his high school sweetheart, Dr. Arline Prigoff. They resided in Sacramento, California.

== Publications ==
- Spraycan Art – 1987, Thames and Hudson of London. James Prigoff and Henry Chalfant. ISBN 0-500-27469-X
- Painting the Towns – Murals of California (1997 – RJD Enterprises). James Prigoff and Robin Dunitz. ISBN o-9632862-4-2
- Walls of Heritage – Walls of Pride – History of African American Murals (2000 – Pomegranate Press). James Prigoff and Robin Dunitz. ISBN 0-7649-1339-5
- Graffiti LA (2007 – Steve Grody) Harry N. Abrams, NYC – foreword ISBN 9780810992986
- Graffiti NY (2009 – Eric Felisbret) Harry N. Abrams, NYC – foreword ISBN 9780810951464
- How/Nosm – The Brazil Diaries, 2012, Running Press, Germany – foreword ISBN 9783937946320
- Essay for the Marcos Raya Book – Chicago, 2004
- Foreword for The Murals of John Pugh – Ten Speed Press – Kevin Bruce 2006 ISBN 978-1-58008-722-3
- Chapter for David M Newman's Sociology – Pine Forge Press – 1000 Oaks, CA – 2004 ISBN 07619-8738-X
- "Murals and the Labor Movement" – Das Andre Amerika – show and catalogue – Berlin-83
- Detroit Art Museum Diego Rivera Show, catalogue 1986 – ISBN 0-393-02275-7
- The History of American Graffiti – Gastman and Neelon – 2010 – Harper Design ISBN 9780061698781
- Art in the Streets – Geffen MOCA, LA – Frontispiece and several photographs – 2012 – Skira Rizzoli ISBN 978-0-8478-3617-8

== Awards ==
- Awarded the title of "Urban Legend" at the Urban Legends LA.Gallery show along with Judy Baca, founder of S.P.A.R.C. in Venice and muralist along with Kent Twitchell, American realist muralist

== Film ==
- From Here to Canarsie – 1986 – with BLADE – co-producer with Henry Chalfant
- Who is Taki 183 – 2020 – with Taki 183 and Cornbread – co-produced with Cedric Godin

== Exhibitions ==
=== 1990 ===
- War and Peace, West Berlin
- Art Against Racism, Vancouver

=== 1994 ===
- Black Power – Black Art – 20 years of African American Murals, California State University, San Francisco
- Made in California – 1900–2000, Los Angeles Museum of Art, Los Angeles, 2000

=== 2001 ===
- Painting and Politics, Social Political Art Resource Center, Venice, California
- Hip Hop Nation, Yerba Buena Art Center, San Francisco, California

=== 2001–2011 ===
- Walls of Heritage – Walls of Pride – traveling Museum art show at the Smithsonian, Washington D.C. and six other venues – co-curator and photographer

=== 2004 ===
- Cambridge Arts Council (CAC)- May 5 – June 30

=== 2010 ===
- San Francisco Graffiti Retrospective, I AM Gallery, San Francisco

=== 2011 ===
- Art in the Streets – LAMOCA, Los Angeles

=== 2012 ===
- James Prigoff – Loyola University, Chicago

=== 2017 ===
- James Prigoff – Art and Design Museum, Los Angeles
- Tate Modern, London – Soul of a Nation – 14 photographs

=== 2018 ===
- Beyond the Streets – Los Angeles
- Brooklyn Museum, Brooklyn, NY – Soul of a Nation – 14 photographs
- Crystal Bridges Museum of American Art, Bentonville, Arkansas – Soul of a Nation – 14 photographs
- Oakland Museum of CA, Oakland, CA – RESPECT: Hip-Hop Style & Wisdom

=== 2019 ===
- Beyond the Streets – NYC – store front photographs
- The Broad, Los Angeles, CA – Soul of a Nation
- de Young Museum, San Francisco, CA – Soul of a Nation
- Museum of Graffiti, Wynwood, FL
- Leave Your Mark – Solo Show – Sacramento, CA

=== 2020 ===
- 1 AM Gallery, San Francisco, CA – From Tags to Riches – solo show

== Lectures ==
- Chicago Art Institute
- S.F. Museum of Modern Art
- S.F. Art Institute
- Vancouver Art Museum
- Stanford University
- University of Southern California
- U.C.L.A.
- U.C. San Diego
- U.C. Berkeley
- Berkeley Art Museum
- U.C. Davis
- California College of the Arts
- C.S.U. SF and Sacramento
- Mural Arts Program, Philadelphia
- Universidad Nacional de Bogota, Colombia
- APECH, Santiago, Chile
- de Young Museum, SF
- Ringling Museum and Sarasota Chalk Festival, Sarasota, Florida
- Pasadena Art Museum
- Loyola University, Chicago
- Ringling College of Art and Design
- Florida College
- 1 AM Gallery

=== City lectures in ===
- San Francisco
- Sacramento
- Chicago
- New Your City
- Boston
- Los Angeles
- San Diego
- Denver
- Paris
- London
- Belfast and Derry, Northern Ireland
- Uppsala, Sweden
- Sydney
- Melbourne
- Perth
- Auckland
- Edinburgh
- Florida

== Donated historical archives ==
- San Francisco Public Library – donation of 1,000 slides, S.F. murals and public art
- Los Angeles at S.P.A.R.C. - donation of 1,000 slides, LA murals and public art.
- Chicago at the C.P.A.G. - donation of 1,000 slides, Chicago murals and public art
- U.C. Santa Barbara – donation of 450 slides, San Diego murals by Victor Ochoa, Mario Torrero, and others including the famous "Chicano Park"
