= I Wanna Be a Hippy =

1995 single by Technohead

Single by Technohead

from the album Headsex
- Released: 16 June 1995
- Genre: Happy hardcore; techno; gabber
- Length: 5:03
- Label: Mokum
- Songwriters: Lee Newman; Michael Wells
- Producer: GTO

Technohead singles chronology
"I Wanna Be a Hippy" (1995)	"Headsex" (1995)

Music video
- "I Wanna Be a Hippy" on YouTube

"I Wanna Be a Hippy" is a song by English electronic music group Technohead. The vocals were taken from David Peel's song "I Like Marijuana", which he sang in the 1989 movie Rude Awakening. It first appeared as the B-side to the group's Mary Jane EP, issued by Dutch hardcore techno label Mokum Records.

In June 1995, "I Wanna Be a Hippy" was released as the lead single from the group's first album, Headsex (1995); the single includes a remix by Dutch-American production duo Flamman & Abraxas. The song appeared on the mainstream charts later that year, peaking at number one in Austria, Flanders, Germany, and the Netherlands and reaching the top 10 in several other countries. In the United Kingdom, the song peaked at number 77 during its original release, but when re-released in early 1996, it reached a new peak of number six. Its accompanying music video was directed by Matthijs Van Heyningen Jr. and filmed in a park in Amsterdam, the Netherlands.

In January and February 1996, Technohead performed the song live on Top of the Pops twice, although both performances had the references to marijuana censored. In September 2019, in celebration of Mokum Records' 200th release, Tellurian and Technohead released a remix of the song known as the "Panama 2019 Mix".

== Background ==
In a 2018 interview with AT5 commemorating 25 years of Mokum Records, Flamman & Abraxas revealed that their remix of the song was meant to be a joke and for the song to get played on the radio. The duo also revealed that when the song first came out, the song was insanely popular at Amnesia, a gabber club the duo opened up in Amsterdam. It reached the point where the song was requested as often as five times a night, leading the duo to contact Technohead about remixing the song due to how frequent it was played. Additionally, they added that despite the massive worldwide chart success of the song, they received no royalties due to a swap deal they did with Technohead. They made this remix for Technohead, in exchange Technohead did a remix for them, but both duo's kept the rights to their song. DJ Dano, who also did a remix of the song that was sold alongside the Flamman & Abraxas remix, didn't get any royalties either because he also made such a swap deal with Technohead. The success of "I Wanna Be a Hippy" also earned Technohead an award at the 1996 Dance d'Or Awards in France.

It was also revealed in the AT5 interview that the song led to the downfall of gabber music in general when "Gabbertje" by Hakkuhbar, also released by Mokum, was released, spurring a wave of "funny gabbers" that made commercial hardcore, which showed similarities to Flamman & Abraxas' style. Despite this, Jeff "Abraxas" Porter joked that because of the remix's success and the string of number-one hits the duo had with the Party Animals, "[They] took over Mokum like Trump took over the Republican Party."

== Critical reception ==
Neil Kulkarni from Melody Maker wrote, "Technohead are probably novelty-gabba but it's fun to hear the pompous solemnity of Tresor-hardbeat applied to such determinedly juvenile ends." The magazine's Simon Reynolds described it as "a pop-gabba stampede with a daft nursery-rhyme punk vocal about pot which sounds like Poly Styrene, but is really a sped-up Sixties folkie!" In a separate review, Melody Maker editor Andrew Mueller said, "'I Wanna Be a Hippy' doesn't state much beyond its title, and it states that in a giddy, panicked helium-addled voice that raises the disagreeable spectre of Lene Lovich with a bat up her ballgown." Music Week gave "I Wanna Be a Hippy" two out of five, adding, "Could be a surprise hit along the lines of Rednex's 'Cotton Eye Joe'. Relentless, speedy techno that's proving a hit across the water."

Robbert Tilli from Music & Media wrote, "Just like their hippy predecessors, dance aficionados have already proclaimed a "summer of love"—that was in 1987. Now Amsterdam-based dance project Technohead is reliving the hippy rituals in more detail with its hilarious Dutch number 1 hit single [...] Living up to the city's liberal climate, it is an uncensored invitation to smoke cannabis." James Hyman from the Record Mirror Dance Update rated it three out of five, saying, "With blatant references to getting high and smoking marijuana, this novelty gabba-fuelled hit has already been number one in Holland, Germany and Austria." Another RM editor, Tim Jeffery gave it top score of five out of five and named it Tune of the Week, commenting, "At breakneck speed, this is pop gabba with its tongue firmly in cheek and it's been a massive hit everywhere in Europe except here [in the UK]. [...] Deserved to be number one in the charts, no question."

== Music video ==
The music video for "I Wanna Be a Hippy", which uses the Flamman & Abraxas mix, shows three gabbers, who Flamman & Abraxas knew from Amnesia, wearing Mokum Records shirts chasing after a hippy on a bike through Vondelpark in Amsterdam with inflatable hammers. The hippy eventually escapes by walking into a funhouse mirror and disappearing. The video was directed by Matthijs Van Heyningen Jr. Robbert Tilli from Music & Media wrote, "Anyway, seeing the video with the Benny Hill-like chase will be enough to convince the sceptics that it's only a joke." Record Mirror editor Tim Jeffery commented, "If you get the European satellite music programmes you'll be familiar with this fabulously irreverant track because its brilliantly funny video, featuring ravers chasing a hippy, has been on heavy rotation for ages." "I Wanna Be a Hippy" was A-listed on several music television channels, as Dutch TMF and German VIVA in July and September 1995. In the aforementioned interview with AT5, MC Remsy revealed that after the song become a huge success, Flamman & Abraxas recruited him and the other gabbers featured in the video to form another group, which became the Party Animals.

== Track listings ==
- CD maxi-single (Europe, 1995)
1. "I Wanna Be a Hippy" (Flamman & Abraxas Radio Mix) – 3:17
2. "I Wanna Be a Hippy" (Original Mix) – 5:03
3. "I Wanna Be a Hippy" (Speedfreak Mix) – 6:04
4. "I Wanna Be a Hippy" (Zippy Mix) – 4:17
5. "I Wanna Be a Hippy" (Dano No Sweat Mix) – 5:12

== Charts ==
=== Weekly charts ===
1995 weekly chart performance for "I Wanna Be a Hippy"
Chart (1995)	Peak position
Australia (ARIA)	20
Austria (Ö3 Austria Top 40)	1
Belgium (Ultratop 50 Flanders)	1
Europe (Eurochart Hot 100)	6
Finland (Suomen virallinen lista)	12
Germany (GfK)	1
Ireland (IRMA)	5
Israel (Israeli Singles Chart)	19
Netherlands (Dutch Top 40)	1
Netherlands (Single Top 100)	1
Scottish Singles Sales (Official Charts)	36
Switzerland (Schweizer Hitparade)	5
UK Singles (Official Charts)	77

1996 weekly chart performance for "I Wanna Be a Hippy"
Chart (1996)	Peak position
Europe (Eurochart Hot 100)	16
Scottish Singles Sales (Official Charts)	3
UK Singles (Official Charts)	6
UK Dance (Official Charts)	13

=== Year-end charts ===
1995 year-end chart performance for "I Wanna Be a Hippy"
Chart (1995)	Position
Australia (ARIA)	88
Austria (Ö3 Austria Top 40)	24
Belgium (Ultratop 50 Flanders)	26
Europe (Eurochart Hot 100)	34
Germany (Media Control)	19
Netherlands (Dutch Top 40)	16
Netherlands (Single Top 100)	11
Switzerland (Schweizer Hitparade)	42

1996 year-end chart performance for "I Wanna Be a Hippy"
Chart (1996)	Position
UK Singles (OCC)	42

== Certifications ==
Certifications for "I Wanna Be a Hippy"
Region	Certification	Certified units/sales
Germany (BVMI)	Gold	250,000^{^}
Netherlands (NVPI)	Gold	50,000^{^}
United Kingdom (BPI)	Silver	200,000^{^}
^{^} Shipments figures based on certification alone.

== Release history ==
Release history and formats for "I Wanna Be a Hippy"
Region	Date	Format(s)	Label(s)	Ref.
Europe	16 June 1995	Maxi-CD	Mokum	
Australia	26 June 1995	12-inch vinyl; CD	Mokum	
Australia	21 August 1995	12-inch vinyl	Mokum	
United Kingdom	11 September 1995	12-inch vinyl; CD; cassette	Mokum	
United Kingdom (re-release)	22 January 1996	12-inch vinyl; CD; cassette	Mokum	

== The Smurfs version ==
"I've Got a Little Puppy"

Single by the Smurfs

from the album The Smurfs Go Pop!
- B-side: "One Smurfing Party"
- Released: 26 August 1996
- Studio: Sound Works (Leeds, England)
- Length: 3:21
- Label: EMI
- Songwriters: Lee Newman; Michael Wells
- Producers: William Jackson; Barry Corbett; Frans Erkelens

The Smurfs singles chronology
"I've Got a Little Puppy" (1996)	"Your Christmas Wish" (1996)

In 1996, the Smurfs released a parody of the song called "I've Got a Little Puppy", which was included on the album The Smurfs Go Pop! as the third track. This version was produced by William Jackson, Barry Corbett, and Frans Erkelens and was released as a single in the United Kingdom on 26 August 1996 through EMI Records. The parody charted within the top 10 of the UK Singles Chart, peaking at number four for two weeks in September 1996. It was the UK's 54th-best-selling single of 1996 and was awarded a silver certification from the British Phonographic Industry (BPI) for shipments exceeding 200,000 copies.

=== Critical reception ===
British columnist James Masterton wrote that "I've Got a Little Puppy" is "ridiculous" yet "so bloody funny", noting that the new lyrics take the track "into a whole new realm". Reviewing The Smurfs Go Pop! on AllMusic, Peter Fawthrop referred to the song as "obscure and delightful as freshly baked Smurfberry pie".

=== Track listings ===
- UK CD single
1. "I've Got a Little Puppy"
2. "I've Got a Little Puppy" (Xenomania club mix)
3. "One Smurfing Party" (radio mix)
4. "One Smurfing Party" (Fuzz Euro mix)
- UK cassette single
1. "I've Got a Little Puppy"
2. "I've Got a Little Puppy" (Xenomania club mix)
3. "One Smurfing Party" (radio mix)

=== Charts ===
==== Weekly charts ====
Weekly chart performance for "I've Got a Little Puppy"
Chart (1996)	Peak position
Europe (Eurochart Hot 100)	25
Ireland (IRMA)	19
Scottish Singles Sales (Official Charts)	3
UK Singles (Official Charts)	4

==== Year-end charts ====
Year-end chart performance for "I've Got a Little Puppy"
Chart (1996)	Position
UK Singles (OCC)	54

=== Certifications ===
Certifications and sales for "I've Got a Little Puppy"
Region	Certification	Certified units/sales
United Kingdom (BPI)	Silver	200,000^{^}
^{^} Shipments figures based on certification alone.
