= Mokum Records =

- Founded: 1993
- Founder: Fred Berkhout
- Genre: Gabber, hardcore techno, happy hardcore
- Country of origin: Netherlands
- Location: Amsterdam
- Official website: mokumrecords.nl

Mokum Records is a Dutch independent record label specialising in early hardcore and hardcore releases. They have released about 100 single and EP vinyl records between 1993 and 1999 and more than 80 since 2004.

Fred Berkhout (Freddy B) created Mokum Records in 1993 as a joke response to another record label, Rotterdam Records. Mokum is a Yiddish term for the city of Amsterdam, and there has been a longstanding rivalry between the two cities, including among Rotterdam-based and Amsterdam-based hardcore fans, who each wanted their "own" label. The label was originally part of the record store Boudisque Records, but was later merged with Roadrunner Records - part of The Island Def Jam Music Group - who closed the label in 1998 because vinyl cost more than it yielded and decided to stop releasing with the medium. The label was revived by Freddy B in 2004 due to the re-emergence of the hardcore scene in the early 2000s, especially with gabber's resurgence in popularity in 2002. (catalog releases starting at 100 reflect this).

Mokum Records achieved chart success all over the world in 1995 with Technohead and their No. 1 hit "I Wanna Be a Hippy", the No. 1 hit "Have You Ever Been Mellow" by the Party Animals, and Technohead's "Happy Birthday", which followed in 1996. The Party Animals would also go on to have two more consecutive #1 hits with "Hava Naquila" and "Aquarius", making them the first ever Dutch act to have their first three singles top the Dutch charts. As well as this success, they are also renowned for their series of compilation albums called "Fucking Hardcore." The series started in 1995 at the height of the label's popularity and finished with "Fucking Hardcore No. 8" in 1998; however, the series was revived in 2016. The label was home to many successful producers and DJs such as Chosen Few, Flamman & Abraxas, Tellurian, The Prophet, Speedfreak, DJ Dano, Scott Brown and Liza N Eliaz.

== Overview ==
Mokum is noted for adopting anti-Fascist statements or notices on its record sleeves in response to Neo-Nazi activity on the early Dutch rave scene. All Mokum releases carry the slogan "UNITED GABBERS AGAINST RACISM & FASCISM" and several artists have released tracks that vocally speak out against racism.

The record company is named after Mokum which is the Yiddish name for the center borough of Amsterdam and was originally used by the Jewish community and was later added to the local Amsterdam dialect.

In 1996, DJ Dano launched a sublabel to Mokum called "Fukem." Fukem was strictly for material that had faster tempos and harder material than material that would be released on the main label. Along with DJ Dano, artists that released under Fukem included Aggroman, Narcanosis, Deadly Buda & the Superstars of Death, and even Technohead had one release on the sublabel with "Cocaine", Michael Wells having been separately credited under the pseudonym Elvis Jackson. The sublabel was short-lived, having only six official releases, and became inactive in 1997.

On 2 December 2016, Mokum, in collaboration with Overdrive Records, announced on Facebook page about the revival of the Fucking Hardcore series after an 18-year hiatus with the ninth entry being released on vinyl in 2016. Activity resumed for the compilations in 2018 when Fucking Hardcore 10 and Fucking Hardcore 11 were released digitally for streaming on 5 July 2018 and 4 April 2019 respectively, these releases being the first to have been entirely digital.

== See also ==
- Early hardcore
- Happy hardcore
- List of record labels
- Make 'Em Mokum Crazy (1996)
