= Spraycan Art =

Book about New York graffiti

- Authors: Henry Chalfant; James Prigoff
- Language: English
- Subject: Graffiti
- Genre: Art
- Set in: New York City
- Published: 1987
- Publisher: Thames & Hudson
- Publication place: United States
- Media type: Print
- Pages: 96
- ISBN: 978-0500274699

Spraycan Art is the first book that documented the initial stages of the worldwide spread of New York City Subway graffiti style and subculture. Authored by Henry Chalfant and James Prigoff and published by Thames & Hudson on September 1, 1987.

The photographs are primarily of walls rather than subway cars, and features the work of Mode 2 and The Chrome Angelz, 3D (Robert Del Naja), Goldie, Bando, Futura, Kaves, Lee, Chico, Tracy 168, Buda, Shame, Blade, Seen, Stash, Reas (aka Todd James), Espo (Stephen Powers) and many others.

== Production ==
Spraycan Art is authored by Henry Chalfant and James Prigoff. It follows the release of Subway Art (1984) by Chalfant and Martha Cooper. The book contains over 200 photos of graffiti art from major cities such as Chicago, Los Angeles, Barcelona, London, Vienna, etc. It also included some interviews.

Unlike the proceeding book which only focussed on New-York graffitis where they originated, it also covers its impact and progression in other cities in the US and Europe.

== Reception ==
The book sold over 100 000 copies, and was the most stolen book in London the year of its release.
