= Dee Nasty =

- Born: Daniel Bigeault; 1960 (age 65–66)
- Origin: Paris, France
- Genres: French hip hop
- Years active: 1981–present

Daniel Bigeault (French pronunciation: [danjɛl biʒo]; born 1960), better known as Dee Nasty, is a French DJ, record producer and rapper. He is one of Radio Nova's original DJs, and is best known for producing France's first hip hop record.

== Career ==
Dee Nasty began his DJing career back in 1981 after discovering Hip-Hop back in 1979. By 1985, he was already forming a formidable reputation both promoting and producing hip hop music. By 1987 he became internationally recognized at the DMC World DJ Championships. He was also DMC Champion of France from 1986 to 1988. He followed up with becoming the European DMC Champion in 1990. He has continued to work in the French Hip-Hop scene featuring prominently on many releases.

== Discography ==
- "Panam City Rappin" (1984)
- "Scienz of Life" (1999)
- "Nastyness" (2001)
- "Underground Forever" (2004)

== Featuring ==
- "Planète Mars" IAM (track "Keep On Scratching"), 1993
- "Système D" Rita Mitsouko (track "Y'a de la haine"), 1993
- "Fighting Spirit" Manu le Malin (track "Mutation"), 2002
- "TR-303" Triptik (track "Hip Hop"), 2003
- "Future School" AMS Crew (multiple tracks), 2005
