= Greater Than One =

English electronic music band

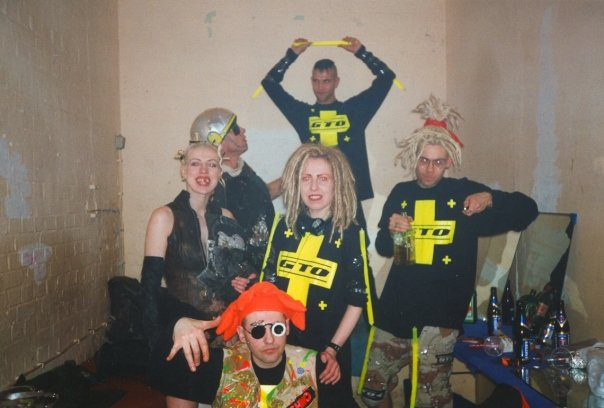
- Greater Than One (Newman and Wells mid)

Background information
- Also known as: Tricky Disco, GTO, John + Julie, Church of Extacy, Signs of Chaos, T.D.5, Salami Brothers, Killout Squad, Technohead L.E.D..
- Origin: London, England
- Genres: House, techno, hardcore techno, trance, industrial (early)
- Years active: 1985–1995, 1996–2000
- Labels: Kunst = Kapital (1987); Wax Trax! Records (1988–89); Go Bang! Records (1990); Warp Records (1990–91); Jumping Man Records (1991); Mokum Records (1995)
- Past members: Michael Wells (1985–2000); Lee Newman (1985–1995; to death)

Greater Than One is an English electronic music band, founded by husband and wife Michael Wells and Lee Newman in 1985. They released many albums under this name, and also under the names Tricky Disco, GTO, John + Julie, Church of Extacy, Signs of Chaos, T.D.5, Salami Brothers, Killout Squad, Technohead and L.E.D.. Only a few of their singles were commercially successful. Since Newman's death on 4 August 1995 from cancer, Wells continues to release music under some of these names, and also as the Man and S.O.L.O.

== 1985: Greater Than One ==
In 1985, Newman and Wells met at the Royal College of Art in London, formed Greater Than One, and released their first album Kill the Pedagogue on cassette. During the late 1980s they organised art installations and exhibitions accompanied by their own music: "When the whole audience were in, we started a soundtrack ... war sirens and searchlights. This was designed to disorientate the audience, throwing them into an unexpected nightmare. After the shock, Islamic chanting began which then changed to Song For England, during which we came onstage wearing illuminous skull masks...". They formed their own label Kunst=Kapital and released four further albums under this alias between 1987 and 1990.

== 1990: First hits ==
Their first hit single was the trance record "Pure" as GTO on Chrysalis Records, a club hit around Europe, closely followed by "Tricky Disco" as Tricky Disco on Warp Records, which peaked at number 14 in the UK Singles Chart in July 1990.

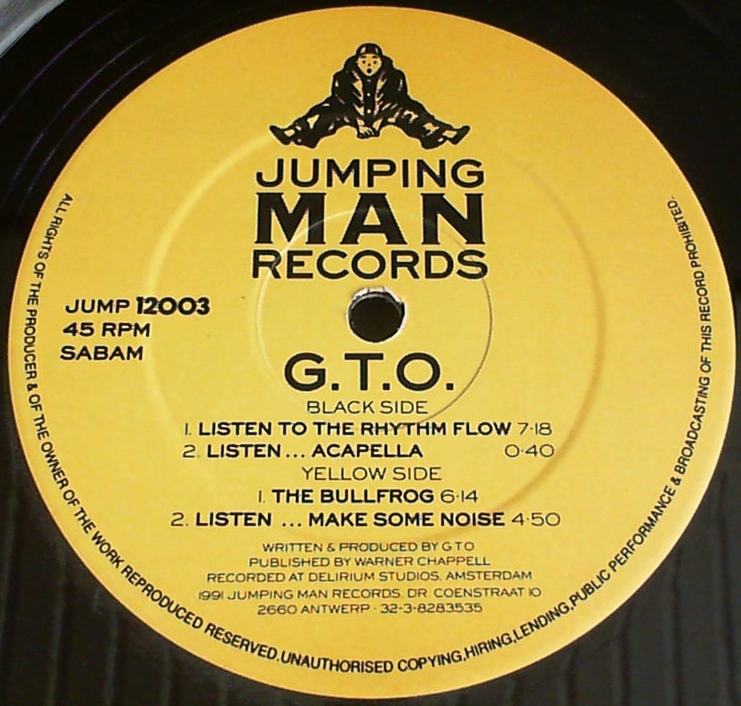
Label of 1991 "Jumping Man Records" record of "Listen To The Rhythm Flow" performed by G.T.O.

They used many aliases because, releasing so much material, they feared the press would not write about it all, if they knew it all came from the same band. As Newman said, "if you give them a Tricky Disco one week and then a John and Julie two weeks later and GTO a month later they’ll write about all of it". Their aliases also allowed them to release different types of material on different record labels. The single "Double Happiness" as John and Julie appeared on XL Recordings; the 12 inch single "Listen to the rhythm flow" as GTO was released on Jumping Man Records in 1991; the 1993 Tip of the Iceberg album as GTO was released on REACT, and the 1995 album Headsex as Technohead appeared on Mokum Records.

== 1995: Technohead ==
Headsex contained their biggest hit, "I Wanna Be a Hippy". The remix by Flamman & Abraxas was accompanied by a video featuring three youths with shaved heads, wearing Mokum T-shirts and carrying inflatable hammers, chasing a hippy on a bicycle around a park in Amsterdam. Newman died later that year in August, after a brief battle with cancer. It reached number 1 in 12 countries including Germany, Netherlands, Belgium and Switzerland, and number 6 in the UK in February 1996, which culminated in two performances on Top of the Pops in January and February of the same year.

Two Technohead follow-up singles followed in 1996. "Happy Birthday" fared mildly well in Europe, cracking the top 20 in the UK and Finland in April at No. 18 and No. 20, respectively, reached the top 40 in Ireland and the Netherlands with peaks at No. 23 and No. 28, respectively, and managed to chart in Germany at No. 100. The follow-up single, "Banana-na-na", which was released in October, cracked the top 40 in the Netherlands at No. 38 and peaked at No. 64 in the UK.

Wells has recorded many singles and three more albums since, including two Tricky Disco singles in February 2007 and two Technohead singles in 2010 and 2014, both of which were released on Mokum Records.

In 2019, Wells returned to Mokum Records to release the song "Hands Up!" in order to commemorate the label's 200th release and also to release the "Wasted EP" as MOK202.

== Discography ==
=== Studio albums ===
==== Greater Than One ====
- Kill the Pedagogue (1985)
- All the Masters Licked Me (1987)
- Trust (recorded 1987 as the first attempt of All the Masters Licked Me)
- Dance of the Cowards (1988)
- London (1989)
- G-Force (1989)
- Index (1991) (EP)
- Duty + Trust (1991 - recorded 1987/1988)

==== GTO ====
- Tip of the Iceberg (1993)

==== Church of Extacy ====
- Technohead (1993)

==== Technohead ====
- Headsex (1995)
- Wasted (EP) (2019)

==== Signs Ov Chaos ====
- Frankenscience (1996)

==== The Man ====
- Phunk Box (1997)

==== Signs of Chaos ====
- Departure (1998)

==== S.O.L.O. ====
- Out Is In (1999)

=== Singles ===
==== Technohead ====
Year	Single	Peak chart positions									Certifications (sales thresholds)	Album
Year	Single	UK	AUS	AUT	BEL (Fl)	FIN	GER	IRE	NL	SWI	Certifications (sales thresholds)	Album
1995	"I Wanna Be a Hippy"	6	20	1	1	12	1	5	1	5	BPI: Silver; BVMI: Gold	Headsex
1995	"Headsex"	—	186	—	50	—	—	—	—	—		Headsex
1996	"Happy Birthday"	18	—	—	—	20	100	23	28	—		Singles only
1996	"Banana Na Na (Dumb Bi Bumb)"	64	—	—	—	—	—	—	36	—		Singles only
2004	"I Wanna Be Hippy (I Wanna Get Stoned 2004 Remix)"	—	—	—	—	—	—	—	58	—		Singles only
2010	"Take Me Away"	—	—	—	—	—	—	—	—	—		Singles only
2014	"Party Boy"	—	—	—	—	—	—	—	—	—		Singles only
2014	"Singing in Da Rave"	—	—	—	—	—	—	—	—	—		Singles only
2019	"Hands Up!"	—	—	—	—	—	—	—	—	—		Singles only
2019	"Eeeeyo"	—	—	—	—	—	—	—	—	—		Wasted EP
2019	"Wasted"	—	—	—	—	—	—	—	—	—		Wasted EP
2019	"Fuck You Bitches (aka F**K YOU B*****$)"	—	—	—	—	—	—	—	—	—		Wasted EP
2019	"You Are My Extacy"	—	—	—	—	—	—	—	—	—		Wasted EP
"—" denotes releases that did not chart.
