= Duncan Stutterheim =

Dutch entrepreneur and sports executive

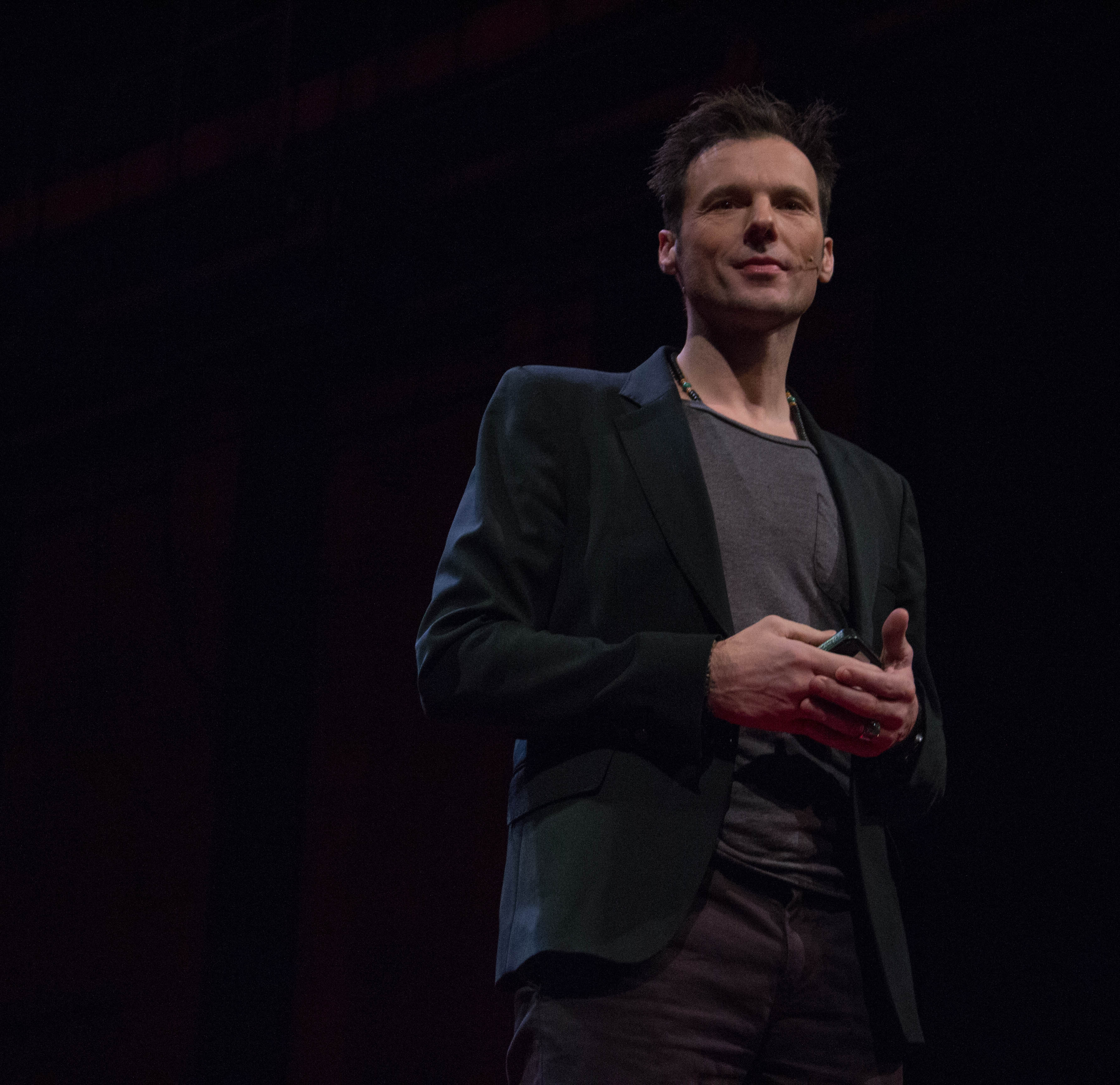
- Stutterheim at TEDxAmsterdam in 2014
- Born: 5 September 1971 (age 54); Purmerend, Netherlands
- Occupations: Entrepreneur, sports executive
- Known for: Co-founding ID&T, A'DAM Toren, Westergas
- Spouse: Lisca Stutterheim
- Children: 3
- Parent: Cor Stutterheim

Duncan Stutterheim (born 5 September 1971) is a Dutch entrepreneur and sports executive. He is best known as the co-founder of the electronic music event company ID&T. Following the sale of ID&T in 2015, Stutterheim transitioned into cultural real estate development in Amsterdam, investing in properties such as the A'DAM Toren and Westergasfabriek.

In March 2026, he was appointed to the Supervisory Board of professional football club AFC Ajax.

== Career ==
=== 1992–2015: ID&T ===
At 18 years old, Stutterheim founded a courier company. A year later, in 1992, Stutterheim and his brother Miles—alongside friends Irfan van Ewijk and Theo Lelie—organised a hardcore house (gabber) party called The Final Exam in Utrecht, which attracted 12,000 attendees. The success of the event led to the creation of ID&T, named after the initials of the founders (Irfan, Duncan, and Theo). Lelie departed the company immediately following the first event, leaving Stutterheim and Van Ewijk to manage the operation.

Despite the death of his brother Miles in a car accident in 2000, Stutterheim continued to build ID&T into one of the largest organisers of dance music festivals in the world, developing event brands such as Trance Energy, Tomorrowland, Sensation, Thunderdome, and Mysteryland.

In March 2013, Stutterheim sold a 75% stake in the company to the American entertainment conglomerate SFX Entertainment for $100 million. Citing severe exhaustion from managing 60 events a year, he formally departed ID&T in April 2015 to take a five-year hiatus from the events industry. That same year, the municipality of Amsterdam awarded him the IJ-prijs for his contributions to the city's cultural and economic profile.

=== 2009–present: Real estate and cultural investments ===
Stutterheim began investing in urban redevelopment and cultural real estate projects while still at ID&T. In 2009, he founded Nachtlab, an incubator and studio complex designed to support young DJs, producers, and electronic music entrepreneurs. His first major real estate acquisition was the Elementenstraat warehouse—the site of his first rave at age 17—which he expanded to a 3,000-person capacity venue and repurposed to house the ID&T corporate offices.

In 2012, alongside entrepreneurs Sander Groet and Hans Brouwer, Stutterheim acquired the former Royal Dutch Shell tower located on the IJ waterfront in Amsterdam-Noord. Following extensive renovations, the building opened in May 2016 as the A'DAM Toren (A'DAM Tower). The multifunctional high-rise features an observation deck, hotel, restaurants, offices, and an underground nightclub. In 2017, he began development on a new commercial tower near Sloterdijk intended to house businesses in the manufacturing industry.

In January 2018, Stutterheim and a group of local investors acquired a major stake in the Westergasfabriek (now known as Westergas), a complex of historic industrial buildings in Amsterdam's Westerpark, maintaining local ownership of the cultural venue. Because the structures are protected monuments, Stutterheim's development group initiated a subterranean excavation project in 2025 to build modern backstage facilities beneath the Gashouder venue without altering its exterior. In October 2025, he launched Amsterdam in Motion, an immersive scale-model exhibition located at the Westergas complex.

=== AFC Ajax ===
On 20 January 2026, professional football club AFC Ajax announced that Stutterheim had been nominated to join the club's Supervisory Board (Raad van Commissarissen). His nomination was formally approved by shareholders during an Extraordinary General Meeting on 9 March 2026. Stutterheim was appointed to a four-year term running until 2030, joining a newly restructured board alongside Lesley Bamberger, Anita Coronel, Marry de Gaay Fortman, and Edo Ophof.

== Personal life ==
Stutterheim is the son of Cor Stutterheim, one of the founders of the Dutch branch of the IT firm CMG (Computer Management Group). He resides in Amsterdam and is married to Lisca Stutterheim, with whom he has three daughters. Outside of business, he has appeared on Dutch television as a guest teacher on the program Dream School.
