= Who Needs Guitars Anyway? =

Studio album by Alice Deejay
- Released: 28 March 2000
- Recorded: 1997–2000
- Genres: Eurodance; pop
- Length: 52:22
- Labels: Violent; Universal/Republic (US); Positiva (UK)
- Producers: Pronti & Kalmani; DJ Jurgen; Svenson & Gielen; Danski & Delmundo

Singles from Who Needs Guitars Anyway?
- 1. "Better Off Alone" Released: December 1998; 2. "Back in My Life" Released: 22 November 1999; 3. "Will I Ever" Released: 29 May 2000; 4. "The Lonely One" Released: September 2000; 5. "Celebrate Our Love" Released: March 2001; 6. "Who Needs Guitars Anyway?" Released: November 2001

Professional ratings
Review scores
Source	Rating
AllMusic	2/5 stars
The Baltimore Sun	(favorable)
The Village Voice	(dud)

Who Needs Guitars Anyway? is the only studio album by Dutch electronic group Alice Deejay, released on 28 March 2000 through Violent Records. It includes the hit singles "Back in My Life", "Better Off Alone", "Will I Ever", "The Lonely One" and "Celebrate Our Love". The album reached the top ten in Finland, Hungary, Ireland and the United Kingdom, where it was certified gold by the BPI, and peaked at number 76 on the US Billboard 200.

Critics were largely unfavourable, but its lead single "Better Off Alone" endured; in 2023 Billboard called it "the most enduring (and emotionally resonant) anthem" of the period when trance crossed over to top 40 radio, noting that its riff is regularly reused in pop music.

== Background and production ==
Alice Deejay was a Dutch dance project fronted by vocalist Judy (Judith Pronk). The album was recorded at several studios in the Netherlands and Belgium: Kamo Studios in The Hague, Made Up Studios in Leidschendam, Svenson Studios in Sint-Niklaas and Violent Studios in Hilversum. Most of the singles, including "Back in My Life", "Better Off Alone" and "Will I Ever", were written and produced by Pronti and Kalmani, while "The Lonely One" was written by Johan Gielen and Sven Maes. Danski produced and, with DJ Delmundo, executive-produced the record; it was mastered by Hay Zeelen. In the United States the album was released by Republic.

== Sales and reception ==
=== Commercial performance ===
Who Needs Guitars Anyway? spent 31 weeks on the Dutch Album Top 100, peaking at number 27, and charted for 19 weeks in Sweden (peak 24), 18 weeks in Norway (peak 14) and 12 weeks in Finland, where it reached number seven. In Switzerland it entered the chart at number 15 on 18 June 2000 and peaked at number 12 during a ten-week run. It reached number eight in the United Kingdom and Ireland and was certified gold by the BPI. In the US, "Better Off Alone" peaked at number 27 on the Billboard Hot 100 on 3 June 2000, while the album peaked at number 76 on the Billboard 200.

=== Critical reception ===
Reviews were generally negative. Dean Carlson of AllMusic described the album as "chock full of bleached-white smiles and powdered trance-pop" and concluded it was "the musical equivalent of a shameless, trite photo-op", though he allowed that the singles "Back in My Life" and "Better Off Alone" showed "pop-tastic dance muscles". Stephen Robinson of Hot Press wrote that "the singles here already sound dated", singling out "Celebrate Our Love" as "just different enough to get by" and judging the album "all very samey". Robert Christgau rated it a "dud" in The Village Voice, whereas J. D. Considine of The Baltimore Sun gave it a favourable review.

== Track listing ==
No.	Title	Length
1.	"Back in My Life"	3:30
2.	"Better Off Alone"	3:36
3.	"Celebrate Our Love"	3:26
4.	"The Lonely One"	3:19
5.	"Who Needs Guitars Anyway?"	4:17
6.	"Will I Ever"	3:28
7.	"Elements of Life"	3:34
8.	"Fairytales"	4:15
9.	"Waiting for Your Love"	3:45
10.	"No More Lies"	3:36
11.	"I Can See (See It in Your Eyes)"	3:45
12.	"Everything Begins with an E"	4:19
13.	"Got to Get Away"	3:41
14.	"Alice Deejay"	3:58
Total length:		52:22

== Charts ==
Chart (2000)	Peak position
Australian Albums (ARIA)	83
Danish Albums (Hitlisten)	29
Dutch Albums (Album Top 100)	27
Finnish Albums (Suomen virallinen lista)	7
French Albums (SNEP)	45
German Albums (Offizielle Top 100)	28
Hungarian Albums (MAHASZ)	4
Irish Albums (IRMA)	8
Norwegian Albums (VG-lista)	14
Scottish Albums (Official Charts)	6
Swedish Albums (Sverigetopplistan)	24
Swiss Albums (Schweizer Hitparade)	12
UK Albums (Official Charts)	8
US Billboard 200	76

== Certifications ==
Certifications for Who Needs Guitars Anyway?
Region	Certification	Certified units/sales
Denmark (IFPI Danmark)	Gold	10,000^{‡}
United Kingdom (BPI)	Gold	100,000^{^}
^{^} Shipments figures based on certification alone.^{‡} Sales+streaming figures based on certification alone.
