= Gabber Piet =

- Also known as: Dogpound, Trouweloze Judas
- Born: Piet van Dolen; 1966; Netherlands
- Genres: Gabber, gabberpop
- Occupations: Record producer, singer
- Years active: 1995–1998
- Labels: ID&T, Bunny Music

Gabber Piet, whose real name is Piet van Dolen (born in 1966), is a Dutch singer and producer of gabber music. He was part of the gabber scene in the mid-1990s, where he became a prominent figure for a time. However, he eventually fell into disgrace due to an unfortunate parody called Hakke en Zage.

== Biography ==
In the mid-1990s, Gabber Piet stood at the center of the Dutch gabber scene. He initially held a position as a promotion manager at ID&T, a label specializing in the distribution of gabber compositions, with his role specifically focusing on happy hardcore tracks. He also hosted a television show called TMF Hakkeeh on the music channel TMF, which covered gabber culture and music.

After the success of the parody Gabbertje by Hakkûhbar, Gabber Piet decided to capitalize on this trend and released his own parody titled Hakke en Zage under the label Bunny Music. This move quickly led to him being ostracized from the gabber scene. In 1998, he attempted a comeback under the new pseudonym Dog Pound with his friends Bass-D and King Matthew, but this effort was unsuccessful.

At the beginning of his career, Gabber Piet produced tracks that were more sung and geared toward gabbers but with a sound similar to happy hardcore, which was later retroactively called "gabberpop." By singing in his compositions, he distinguished himself from the typically lyric-free and minimalistic gabber music. Later, he fell into caricature and commercial pandering. As a result, he was effectively excluded from the gabber scener despite issuing apologies. Evidence of this is his placement in the "Hall of Shame" on the Thunderdome website, even though he was initially employed by ID&T.

Hakke en Zage is the title most immediately associated with Gabber Piet. It's a musical parody of gabber music, with the title referring to "hakken," the dance style of gabbers. Based on a musical foundation that loosely resembles the melody of a traditional gabber track, Gabber Piet performs lyrics based on the theme song from Peppi en Kokki, a Dutch comedy duo from the 1970s. The accompanying music video resembles "a gabber's walk in the woods," featuring Sjonnies and Anitas chopping wood while performing hakken. This song was received by gabbers as a mocking portrayal of their culture, music genre, and lifestyle.

The song, released as a single in 1996, achieved immediate success, reaching the second position on the Dutch Top 40. It was later included as a hidden track on his album Love The Hardcore, released the following year. Despite Gabber Piet offering apologies to gabbers for his actions, his image as a "true" gabber was irreparably damaged.

"If Hakke en Zage could be seen as a masterstroke in terms of media attention, it was an emotional tragedy for me. No one can blame me for wanting to make money. I could, if I wanted to, perform a concert every night. I prefer spending my evenings organizing raves. I hope the gabbers have understood that it was nothing more than a joke. It was actually a response to Hakkûhbar, because that kind of record gives gabbers a bad name. Don't you agree? Oh yes, there were also the 60,000 singles sold, to which you need to add the 250,000 copies of various compilations it appeared on. This only demonstrates how much people agreed with my viewpoint."

— Gabber Piet

After his gabber phase, Piet van Dolen was found coaching the amateur football club OSM '75 in Maarssenbroek in 2014.

== Discography ==
=== Studio albums ===
- 1997: Love the Hardcore

=== Singles ===
- 1998: Bass-D & King Matthew feat. Dogpound – Theme from Dogpound (under the name Dogpound)
- 1998: Bass-D & King Matthew feat. Dogpound – The New Dance (under the name Dogpound)

==== Chart singles ====
| Year | Tile | Entry date (Dutch Top 40) | Top place | Weeks |
|---|---|---|---|---|
| 1996 | Hakke en Zage | 21 December 1996 | 2nd | 11 |
| 1997 | Love U Hardcore | 19 April 1996 | 16th | 6 |
