= Beatmania IIDX 7th Style =

2002 video game

- Titlescreen of the CS version
- Developers: Konami (Arcade), Konami Computer Entertainment Studio (Console)
- Publishers: Konami (Arcade), Konami Computer Entertainment Studio (Console)
- Series: Beatmania IIDX & Bemani
- Platforms: Arcade & Sony PlayStation 2
- Release: Arcade: JP: March 27, 2002; PlayStation 2: JP: May 13, 2004
- Genre: Music
- Modes: Single-player & Multiplayer
- Arcade system: Bemani Twinkle

beatmania IIDX 7th Style is the seventh game in the beatmania IIDX series of music video games. It was released in arcades by Konami in March 2002.

== Gameplay ==
Beatmania IIDX tasks the player with performing songs through a controller consisting of seven key buttons and a scratchable turntable. Hitting the notes with strong timing increases the score and groove gauge bar, allowing the player to finish the stage. Failing to do so depletes the gauge until it is empty, abruptly ending the song.

The core gameplay remains the same in 7th Style. 5-key mode has been changed from a difficulty to its own modifier, allowing it to be used on any difficulty level as with normal charts. A new spinoff of Expert Mode also debuted, Daninintei (Class) mode, a mode containing a series of courses ranked so that each course is more difficult than the last, the highest rank course a player can beat in Dan mode is often used to compare players. Dan mode would have significant integration in future styles implementing the e-Amusement system, which could save a player's rank, and may also restrict access to specific songs based on their current rank.

== Music ==
This is the complete list of new songs from the arcade version of Beatmania IIDX 7th Style. Songs highlighted in green need to be unlocked. The Extra Stage (highlighted red) is "MAX 300", while the One More Extra Stage is "革命".

Genre	Song	Artist
RAVE	"2002"	tiger YAMATO
FAKE JAZZ	"9 o'clocks"	SYMPHONIC DEFOGGERS
RENAISSANCE	"A"	D.J.Amuro
ALTERNATIVE HOUSE	"AVE DE RAPINA"	Shawn The Horny Master
FILTER HOUSE	"Bad Routine"	D.J. Spugna
TRIBAL BASS	"BRING HER DOWN"	AKIRA YAMAOKA
12 BEAT	"Burning Heat! (Full Option Mix)"	Mr.T with Motoaki.F
SUPER EUROBEAT	"BURNING UP FOR YOU"	SARA
BIG BEAT	"Cheer Train"	Fuzita Blender
DRUM 'N' BASS	"CLOUDY MUSIC"	SLAKE
HYPER ROCK BEAT	"D2R"	NAOKI
HYPER EUROBEAT	"DESTINY"	NAOKI feat. Paula Terry
SOUL	"E.V CAFE"	reo nagumo feat. hajime.y
TECHNO	"entrance"	Kobo project with Masa
PROGRESSIVE JAZZ	"foreplay"	Osamu Kubota
UK GARAGE/2-STEP	"General Relativity"	SYMPHONIC DEFOGGERS
HIP HOP & SOUL	"Glorious Days"	Noria
BIG BEAT	"Gravity"	TaQ
HOUSE	"Happy Wedding"	ASKA
SUPER EUROBEAT	"HEARTBEAT"	NATHALIE
TRANCE	"i feel..."	AKIRA YAMAOKA
EUROBEAT	"Last Message"	good-cool feat. Meg
AMBIENT POP	"Let the Snow Paint Me"	Sana
SUPER EUROBEAT	"LOVE GENERATION"	SUZY LAZY
NEW WAVE	"Love Me Do"	AKIRA YAMAOKA
YEYE	"Marmalade Reverie"	Orange Lounge
2STEP	"more deep (ver.2.1)"	Togo project feat. Sana
TRANCE	"Never Look Back"	DuMonde
LIBRARY BEATS	"New York"	Fuzita Blender
SUPER EUROBEAT	"REMEMBER ME"	LESLIE PARRISH
SOFT ROCK	"Secret Tale"	dj nagureo feat. asuka.m
SUPER EUROBEAT	"SOLID GOLD"	DUSTY
POPS	"Somebody Like You"	good-cool
HOUSE	"Spica"	D.JW
HARD HOUSE	"Spooky"	good-cool
TECHNO	"stoic"	TaQ
TRANCE	"The Beauty Of Silence"	Svenson & Gielen
TRANCE	"The Sound Of Goodbye"	Armin van Buuren presents:Perpetuous Dreamer
TRANCE	"Tomorrow Perfume"	dj TAKA
Trance	"Traces"	TaQ
ELECTROSHOCK	"ZERO-ONE"	Mr.T
HARDCORE TECHNO	"MAX 300"	Ω
ORCHESTRAL	"革命"	dj TAKA with NAOKI

- Burning Heat! (Full Option Mix) - a remix of the song Burning Heat! from Gradius II.
- The Beauty of Silence by Svenson & Gielen, Never Look Back by DuMonde and The Sound of Goodbye by Perpetuous Dreamer are the last Avex Trax Trance licenses.
- Extra Stage - To access the Extra Stage (or the One More Extra Stage from the Extra Stage), the player must AAA a flashing 7-ranked song with Hard mode on. The extra stage is MAX 300, a song well known as being the extra stage from DDRMAX: Dance Dance Revolution 6thMix (which had been released a few months before). The OMES is Kakumei, a remix of Chopin's Revolutionary Étude by dj TAKA with NAOKI (which is also the OMES of DDRMAX2).

== Home version ==
The home version of 7th Style was released 2 years later in 2004 for the PlayStation 2. It was First Series that Developed from Konami Computer Entertainment Studio. It contained two preview songs from 8th and 9th Style, as well as some revivals. 5-Key was left as a mode instead of a modifier (unlike the arcade version), and unlike future home releases, the special Extra Stage methods were not present. Masters Mode was also introduced as a modified version of Survival Mode.
