= Pigman =

Pigman or pig man may refer to:

== People ==
- Cary Pigman (born 1958), Florida politician
- William Ward Pigman (1910-1977), carbohydrate chemist
- Peter-Paul Pigmans (1961–2003), Dutch music producer

== Creative works ==
- The Pigman, a book by Paul Zindel
- Pigman (film), a 2012 Indian Malayalam film
- "PigMan", a song by Mondo Generator on their album Cocaine Rodeo
- "The Pig Man", a song by Amon Düül II on their album Vive la Trance
- Pigman, a character played by Jody Racicot in the film PCU
- Pigman: A Comedy in Three Acts, a play by Robert Chesley
- Pig man, a fictional hospital patient that Seinfeld character Cosmo Kramer saw in the episode "The Bris"

== See also ==
- Piglady
