= Higher and Higher =

Higher and Higher may refer to:

== Film and theater ==
- Higher and Higher (musical), a 1940 Broadway musical
- Higher and Higher (film), a 1943 film adaptation of the musical

== Music ==
=== Albums ===
- Higher and Higher: The Best of Heaven 17, 1993
- Higher & Higher, by Jimmy Cliff, 1996

=== Songs ===
- "Higher & Higher" (The Blackout song), 2011
- "Higher & Higher" (DJ Jurgen song), 2000
- "(Your Love Keeps Lifting Me) Higher and Higher", by Jackie Wilson, 1967; covered by Rita Coolidge, 1977
- "Higher and Higher", by Dirty Heads from Home – Phantoms of Summer, 2013
- "Higher and Higher", by Galactic from Into the Deep, 2015
- "Higher & Higher", by Milk & Sugar, 2000
- "Higher and Higher", by the Moody Blues from To Our Children's Children's Children, 1969

== See also ==
- Higher, Higher (disambiguation)
