= The Beauty of Silence =

2000 song performed by Airscape

Single by Svenson & Gielen
- Released: 2000
- Genre: Uplifting trance
- Length: 9:13
- Label: ID&T
- Songwriter(s): Sven Maes and Johan Gielen

The Beauty of Silence is an uplifting trance track that was composed and produced by Sven Maes and Johan Gielen. The song was a huge hit in Japan and was the title track for a compilation of singles released by Avex. The Beauty of Silence was the theme to the 5th edition of the European dance event called Trance Energy.

It has retained its popularity over the years. It has been included on the two-disc album Club Nation America by Johnny Vicious and Tall Paul. It is also the title track of Svenson & Gielen's only studio album The Beauty of Silence.

One of the show points of this tune is the silence transitioning two passages of the tune. Trance is marked by repetitious rhythmic electronic beat and here it is played in point and counterpoint.

As a result of the song's success in Japan, it was included on beatmania IIDX 7th Style as a playable song with two other songs licensed by Avex.

Two official music videos have been made for the song. The first is of Svenson & Gielen performing to club goers attending a stadium trance festival. It can be found on Be Yourself Music's official YouTube channel. The second is a CGI animated video of Sven Maes and Johan Gielen fighting an android in a virtual arena.

Official reworks of the song have been released twice on the record label High Contrast Recordings. In 2010, the W&W vs. Jonas Stenberg remix was released and in 2013, two separate remixes by Menno de Jong and Artento Divini were released.

== Recordings ==
- Original versions
- "The Beauty of Silence (Radio Edit)" - 3:03
- "The Beauty of Silence (Original Extended)" - 9:15
- "The Beauty of Silence (Johan Gielen Essential Dark Mix)" - 7:18
- "The Beauty of Silence (Pump Mix)" - 9:37
- 2010 Remix
- "The Beauty of Silence (W&W vs Jonas Stenberg Remix)" - 6:38
- 2013 Remixes
- "The Beauty of Silence (Menno de Jong)" - 6:41
- "The Beauty of Silence (Artento Divini Remix)" - 5:11
- Other versions
- beatmania IIDX 7th Style Original Soundtrack - "The Beauty of Silence" - 2:00

== See also ==
- Dawnseekers
- UR/A Tear in the Open
