= Gabberpop =

Genre of music combining gabber and pop

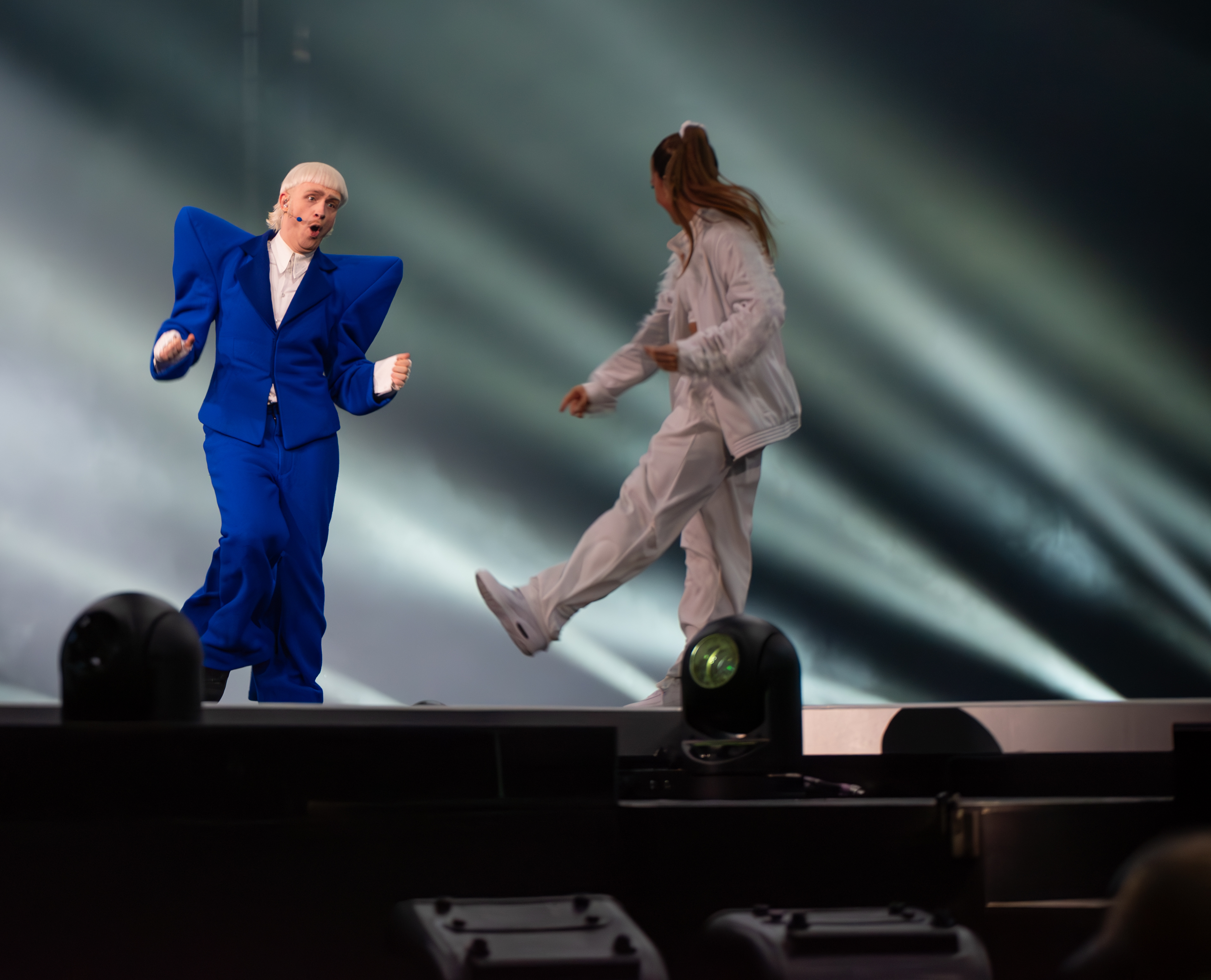
- Joost Klein performing "Europapa" at Eurovision 2024 in Malmö, Sweden.
- Stylistic origins: Techno hardcore, happy hardcore, pop, nederpop
- Cultural origins: Early 1990s; Netherlands
- Typical instruments: Drum machine, keyboard, sampler, synthesizers, sequencer

Regional scenes
- Belgium, Netherlands

Gabberpop, also known as gabber-pop or pop-gabber, is a musical genre that combines elements of pop music with gabber-related genres such as happy hardcore. The genre is characterized by the predominant mix of powerful kicks and pop or rap vocals. Its tempo typically ranges between 150 and 180 BPM.

== History ==
=== Beginnings and Success ===
The genre emerged in the 1990s. The rise of gabberpop is exemplified by groups like Hakkûhbar and Party Animals, which capitalized on the popularity of happy hardcore. These groups gained fame by combining elements of hardcore with more accessible pop music and even children's nursery rhymes. This approach helped them attract a broader audience. However, some members of the gabber scene viewed this evolution negatively. They saw the rise of "sold-out" artists, such as Gabber Piet and his parody hit Hakke & zage (which mixes children's pop with gabber), as an attack on the original core of gabber culture.

=== Resurgence ===
The genre made a comeback in 2023 when Joost Klein, Ski Aggu, and Otto Waalkes achieved success in Germany with their gabber pop single Friesenjung, and the song Droom Groot, released in the same year, also used this introductory term. After it was announced at the end of 2023 that Joost Klein would represent the Netherlands in the Eurovision Song Contest 2024, the press dubbed him the "prince of gabberpop". His song "Europapa" also belongs to this genre, and these songs were co-produced by Teun de Kruif, better known as Tantu Beats, who contributed to popularizing the genre alongside Joost.

== Artists ==
Artists associated with gabber pop include Joost Klein, Björk Chibi Ichigo, Goldband, Party Animals, Paul Elstak, and Ascendant Vierge.
