= Higher & Higher (DJ Jurgen song) =

Single by DJ Jurgen
- B-side: "Remix"
- Released: 2000
- Genre: Eurodance; house; trance
- Length: 3:53
- Label: AM:PM; Central Station; Club Tools; G2; Kontor Records; Insolent Tracks; Mo'Bizz Recordings
- Songwriters: E. De Koning; G.Pernel; J.Rijkers; M.Pols
- Producers: DJ Jurgen; Erik De Koning; Mark van Dale

DJ Jurgen singles chronology
"Better Off Alone" (1998)	"Higher & Higher" (2000)	"One Step Away" (2002)

Music video
- "Higher & Higher" on YouTube

"Higher & Higher" is a song recorded by Dutch DJ, remixer and producer DJ Jurgen (a.k.a. Jürgen Rijkers). It was released in 2000 via various labels as single only and features vocals by singer Karen Shenaz (a.k.a. Karen David). The track was a huge hit in the Netherlands, where it peaked at number five. Additionally, it was a top-20 hit in Belgium, a top-70 hit in Germany and a top-90 hit in Switzerland. Outside Europe, the song peaked at number 34 on the Billboard Dance Club Songs chart in the US. The accompanying music video features Shenaz performing in an elevator going up and down, while she watches different people entering and leaving.

== Track listing ==
- CD single, Germany (2000)
1. "Higher & Higher" (Radio Mix) — 3:53
2. "Higher & Higher" (Extended Vocal) — 7:07
- CD single, Netherlands (2000)
1. "Higher & Higher" (Radio Mix) — 3:53
2. "Higher & Higher" (Magica Remix) — 5:37
- CD maxi, Europe (2000)
1. "Higher & Higher" (Radio Edit) — 3:53
2. "Higher & Higher" (Klubbheads Mix) — 8:11
3. "Higher & Higher" (Extended Vocal) — 7:07
4. "Higher & Higher" (Dub Foundation Mix) — 9:24
5. "Higher & Higher" (Magica Remix) — 5:37

== Charts ==
=== Weekly charts ===
Chart (2000)	Peak position
Belgium (Ultratop 50 Flanders)	18
Germany (GfK)	63
Netherlands (Dutch Top 40)	5
Netherlands (Single Top 100)	9
Switzerland (Schweizer Hitparade)	86
US Hot Dance Club Songs (Billboard)	34

=== Year-end charts ===
Chart (2000)	Position
Netherlands (Dutch Top 40)	52
Netherlands (Single Top 100)	72
