= Trance Energy =

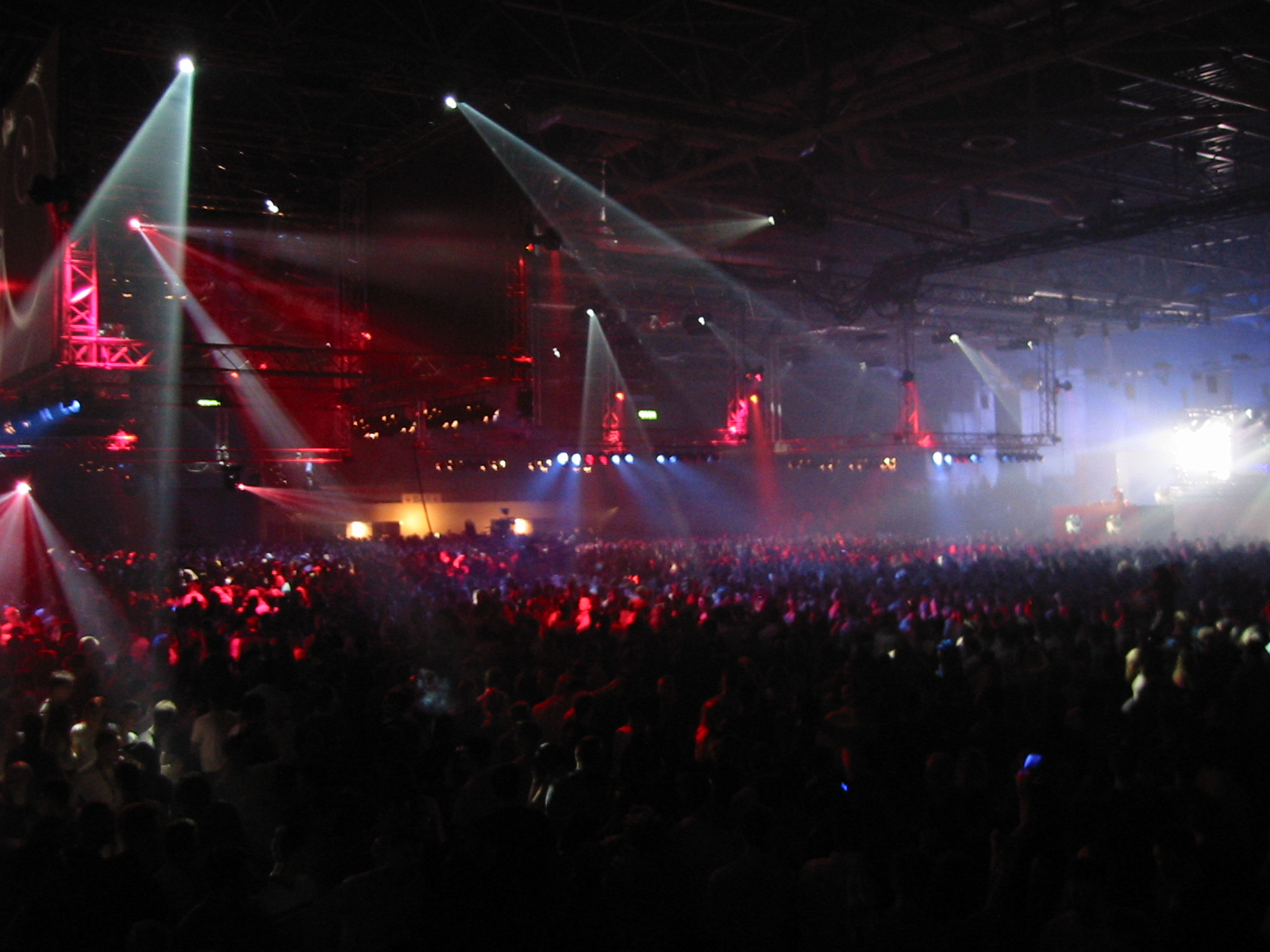
- Trance Energy Utrecht 2002
- Genre: Electronic dance music, trance
- Location: The Netherlands
- Years active: 1999-2010; 2011-2013 (as Energy)
- Founders: ID&T
- Website: Official site

Trance Energy was a Dutch trance event featuring trance music DJs from around the world. It was organized by ID&T and was held since 1999 in various venues in the Netherlands. In 2011, ID&T changed the concept and renamed the festival to "Energy", opening the festival to other genres from Trance only.

== History ==
The event was founded in 1999. Traditionally, there was a "small" edition and a big edition each year. In 2002, the small edition failed to sell out its 20,000-person ticket capacity (only 15,000 tickets were sold) and thereafter, Trance Energy was only held once annually, at the Jaarbeurs convention center in Utrecht, where it has been sold out each year up to 2009. The festival gained "cult" status among trance fans. In 2010, it failed to sell out by slight margins since it was organized on Easter week end and this was problematic for some foreign visitors (especially from Poland).

While audience in the first years was mostly Dutch, there were subsequently many international visitors, mainly from the European Union but sometimes from other areas around the world. This is due to the festival earning worldwide fame thanks to bootlegs of DJ mixes and some official videos of former editions. At the 2010 edition, it has been quoted by ID&T that more than 40% of the audience was not Dutch.

In 2011, ID&T changed the concept and renamed the festival to "Energy", opening the festival to other genres from Trance only. The change was announced in September 2010, and labelled as a simple "name change". However, it wasn't just that and non-trance artists were included in the line-up. This change caused controversy and was very negatively greeted on internet forums. Meanwhile, one ID&T competitor launched a Trance only festival in the Netherlands. As a result, attendance declined steadily with edition 2011 and 2012 being not sold out by large margins (only half of 2012 tickets were sold). In 2013, the event was moved to the Ziggo Dome, a smaller venue in Amsterdam and still it failed to sell out. There was no announcement of a 2014 edition.

In 2017, Trance Energy "returned" as a stage at Tomorrowland, also organized by ID&T. In 2018, Trance Energy was a stage at Tomorrowland and Mysteryland too. Since then, Trance Energy has remained at Mysteryland.

== Description of the Event ==
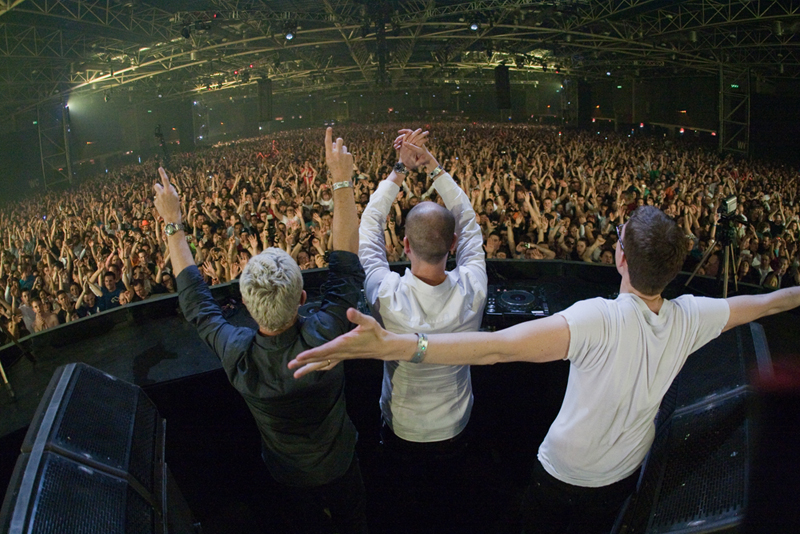
Above & Beyond performing during Trance Energy in 2010.

Past 2003 editions of Trance Energy usually focus on three stages located in different halls of the Jaarbeurs convention center and connected by corridors :

- The "Mainstage" (capacity : 20,000 people) where headliner DJs of the night do their sets. The sets are usually between one and two hours long. Impressive light shows with lasers, lights and fireworks are featured along with some acts (Dancers, Live acts, DJ sets, etc...). The setup is quite typical of a "classic" trance party: Minimal decorations with most of the ambience being created by lights and the structural elements used to rig them. Only the size makes it different.
- The "Madhouse" (capacity : 5,000 people) which features more house and club music. This stage has sometimes been criticized by some of the visitors who find the music played there too distant from the "trance" theme of the event.
- An alternate stage whose name changes each year (capacity : 5,000 people) where edgier trance than on the mainstage is played. This stage often features very famous names who are able to take more risks musically speaking than what they would be allowed on the mainstage.

Since 2007, a fourth stage has been added, the "Hard Stage" featuring harder derivatives of Trance Music. In 2009, students of the Utrecht School for the Arts were asked to design the entrance of the festival. They created a multi-disciplinary entrance, where interactivity, game-elements, video, fashion and music came together.

Trance Energy toured Australia in 2009. The tour attracted controversy after police shut down the Melbourne leg early due to 26 overdoses.

== History of editions ==
Here is the list of Trance Energy editions :

Edition	Date	Venue	Anthem	Spectators
1	30-4-1999	Beursgebouw Eindhoven		8 500 (Sold Out)
2	30-10-1999	Statenhal The Hague		10 000 (Sold out)
3 (Energy 2000)	31-12-1999	Beursgebouw Eindhoven		8 500 (Sold out)
4	29-4-2000	Beursgebouw Eindhoven		8 500 (Sold out)
5	30-9-2000	Thialf Heerenveen	Svenson & Gielen - The Beauty of Silence	20 000 (Sold out)
6	17-2-2001	Jaarbeurs Utrecht	Push - Strange World	30 000 (Sold out)
7	20-10-2001	Thialf Heerenveen	Svenson & Gielen - Twisted	20 000 (Sold out)
8	16-2-2002	Jaarbeurs Utrecht	Svenson & Gielen - We Know What You Did	30 000 (Sold out)
9	21-9-2002	Thialf Heerenveen	Svenson & Gielen - Answer The Question	15 000
10	15-2-2003	Jaarbeurs Utrecht	Cygnus X - Positron	30 000 (Sold out)
11	31-1-2004	Jaarbeurs Utrecht	Svenson - Sunlight Theory	30 000 (Sold out)
12	12-2-2005	Jaarbeurs Utrecht	Rank 1 - Beats@Rank-1 Dotcom	30 000 (Sold out)
13	11-2-2006	Jaarbeurs Utrecht	Marcel Woods - Advanced	30 000 (Sold out)
14	3-3-2007	Jaarbeurs Utrecht	Joop - The Future	30 000 (Sold out)
15	23-2-2008	Jaarbeurs Utrecht	Ernesto vs Bastian - Thrill	30 000 (Sold out)
16	7-3-2009	Jaarbeurs Utrecht	Rank 1 - L.E.D. There Be Light	30 000 (Sold out)
17	3-4-2010	Jaarbeurs Utrecht	Sander van Doorn - Renegade	27 000
18 (Energy)	19-2-2011	Jaarbeurs Utrecht	Jochen Miller - Classified	20 000
19 (Energy)	3-3-2012	Jaarbeurs Utrecht	Hardwell - Cobra	15 000
20 (Energy)	2-3-2013	Ziggodome Amsterdam	Sunnery James & Ryan Marciano, Jaz Von D - Firefaces	14 000

== See also ==
- List of electronic music festivals
