= Higher, Higher =

Higher, Higher may refer to:

- "Higher, Higher", a song by Justin Timberlake from Man of the Woods, 2018
- "Higher, Higher", a song by Maki Ohguro, 2016
- Higher! Higher!, a baby book by Leslie Patricelli

== See also ==
- Higher and Higher (disambiguation)
