= Will I Ever =

2000 single by Alice Deejay

Single by Alice Deejay

from the album Who Needs Guitars Anyway?
- Released: 29 May 2000
- Studio: Kamo 1 (The Hague, Netherlands)
- Length: 3:16
- Label: Violent; Positiva
- Songwriters: Pronti and Kalmani
- Producers: Pronti and Kalmani

Alice Deejay singles chronology
"Back in My Life" (1999)	"Will I Ever" (2000)	"The Lonely One" (2000)

Music video
- "Will I Ever" on YouTube

"Will I Ever" is the third single release by Dutch Eurodance group Alice Deejay. Released in May 2000 as the third single from Who Needs Guitars Anyway?, the song became a top-10 hit in Ireland, the Netherlands, Romania, Sweden, and the United Kingdom.

== Chart performance ==
"Will I Ever" charted within the top 10 in Ireland, Romania, Sweden, the United Kingdom, and the band's native Netherlands. In the UK, where the song was released on 3 July 2000, it reached number seven on the UK Singles Chart but charted higher in Scotland, reaching number two on that region's chart, ensuring the band's first three singles all reached the top two. At the end of 2000, it came in at number 97 on the UK's year-end chart. In Ireland, the song was the band's final top-30 hit, reaching number eight.

In the rest of Europe, the single fared well, reaching the top 40 in Flanders, Denmark, France, Germany, Norway, and Switzerland. On the Eurochart Hot 100, it peaked at number 18. Outside the continent, the song did not garner success in the United States, but it did manage to find some popularity in Canadian dance clubs, reaching number 24 on Canada's RPM Dance Top 40. It was also moderately successful in Australia, peaking at number 65 on the ARIA Singles Chart.

== Music video ==
A music video was made for the song. It features Alice Deejay singer Judith Anna Pronk in three different roles: a singer-dancer, a security guard, and a Greek woman. The music video uses the Hitradio mix of the song.

=== Synopsis ===
During the first part, it features Pronk and Alice Deejay dancers (Mila Levesque and Angelique Versnel) in the hallways of an empty, white building on a stormy night. Pronk, as a security guard, also roams around the area. She reaches a painting depicting a Greek woman, who is also Pronk, and stops to look at it, realising the resemblance between the two of them. The figure in the portrait blinks, and the guard steps inside. The next part of the video features many people dressed in ancient Greek apparel dancing in a temple with a statue; Pronk and her dancers are also there. The security guard is then shown arriving at a restroom. She sings next to a mirror as the Greek woman admires a man and feeds him grapes. As the guard exits the restroom, all the Greeks feed each other grapes and other fruits. In the final section of the video, Pronk sings and dances with her dancers. The video ends at the stormy building, showing the painting the security guard looked at previously, with Pronk inside now still.

== Track listings ==
Dutch and French CD single

1. "Will I Ever" (Hitradio mix) – 3:16
2. "Will I Ever" (Dutchforce remix) – 7:21

Dutch maxi-CD single

1. "Will I Ever" (Hitradio mix) – 3:16
2. "Will I Ever" (Hitradio XL) – 5:12
3. "Will I Ever" (Dutchforce remix) – 7:21
4. "Will I Ever" (E-Craig Clubmix) – 7:00
5. "Will I Ever" (Pronti & Kalmani remix) – 7:20

UK CD1

1. "Will I Ever" (Hitradio mix) – 3:14
2. "Will I Ever" (Hitradio XL) – 5:26
3. "Back in My Life" (Pronti & Kalmani club dub) – 6:06
4. "Will I Ever" (enhanced video)

UK CD2

1. "Will I Ever" (E-Craig Clubmix) – 7:00
2. "Will I Ever" (Pronti & Kalmani remix) – 6:19
3. "Will I Ever" (Dutchforce remix) – 6:23

UK cassette single

1. "Will I Ever" (Hitradio mix) – 3:14
2. "Will I Ever" (Hitradio XL) – 5:26
3. "Back in My Life" (Pronti & Kalmani club dub) – 6:06

Canadian maxi-CD and 12-inch single

1. "Will I Ever" (Pronti & Kalmani XL version) – 5:27
2. "Will I Ever" (E-Craig club remix) – 7:00
3. "Will I Ever" (Pronti & Kalmani remix) – 7:18
4. "Will I Ever" (Dutchforce instrumental remix) – 7:19

Australian and New Zealand maxi-CD single

1. "Will I Ever" (Hitradio edit) – 3:16
2. "Will I Ever" (Dutch Force remix) – 7:21
3. "Will I Ever" (Pronti & Kalmani X1 version) – 5:26
4. "Will I Ever" (E-Craig club remix) – 7:00
5. "Will I Ever" (Pronti & Kalmani remix) – 7:17

== Credits and personnel ==
Credits are lifted from the Dutch CD single liner notes.

Studio

- Recorded at Kamo Studio 1 (The Hague, Netherlands)

Personnel

- Pronti and Kalmani – writing, production
- Danski and DJ Delmundo – executive production
- Shop Around! – graphic design
- Claudine Grin – photography

== Charts ==
=== Weekly charts ===
Chart (2000)	Peak position
Australia (ARIA)	65
Belgium (Ultratop 50 Flanders)	20
Belgium (Ultratip Bubbling Under Wallonia)	17
Canada Dance/Urban (RPM)	24 (Note: "Will I Ever" reached number 24 when RPM ceased publication in November 2000.)
Czech Republic (IFPI)	41
Denmark (IFPI)	13
Europe (Eurochart Hot 100)	18
France (SNEP)	37
Germany (GfK)	33
Ireland (IRMA)	8
Ireland Dance (IRMA)	5
Netherlands (Dutch Top 40)	8
Netherlands (Single Top 100)	10
Norway (VG-lista)	16
Romania (Romanian Top 100)	3
Scottish Singles Sales (Official Charts)	2
Sweden (Sverigetopplistan)	10
Switzerland (Schweizer Hitparade)	25
UK Singles (Official Charts)	7

=== Year-end charts ===
Chart (2000)	Position
Belgium (Ultratop 50 Flanders)	99
Ireland (IRMA)	62
Netherlands (Dutch Top 40)	70
Netherlands (Single Top 100)	82
Romania (Romanian Top 100)	37
Sweden (Hitlistan)	78
UK Singles (OCC)	97

== Certifications ==
Region	Certification	Certified units/sales
Sweden (GLF)	Gold	15,000^{^}
United Kingdom (BPI)	Silver	200,000^{‡}
^{^} Shipments figures based on certification alone.^{‡} Sales+streaming figures based on certification alone.

== Release history ==
Region	Date	Format(s)	Label(s)	Ref.
France	2000	12-inch vinyl; CD	Hot Tracks	
Europe	29 May 2000	CD	Violent	
United Kingdom	3 July 2000	CD; cassette	Positiva	
