= Thunderdome (music festival) =

Dutch music festival

- The ID&T wizard, in later years only used for the Thunderdome concept
- Genre: Electronic music, hardcore techno and gabber
- Locations: Netherlands; Germany; Belgium; Australia; Spain; Switzerland; Italy
- Years active: 1992–2012, 2017–present
- Founders: ID&T
- Website: www.thunderdome.com

Thunderdome is a concept in hardcore techno and gabber music that has mainly been used for a series of parties and compilation CD albums with various artists. It is organized by the Dutch entertainment company ID&T. It started with a party in 1992, but quickly grew to a series of events in large venues. They have featured some of the biggest names in gabber and related styles as DJs and MCs. Also associated with the events and merchandise is the image of a wizard that was originally the logo of the organizers. In 2022, Thunderdome celebrated its 30th anniversary at the Jaarbeurs convention centre, Utrecht.

== History ==
Before the Thunderdome concept was started, ID&T organized a big rave called The Final Exam, that was held on 20 June 1992. This was the first attempt to bring hardcore and gabber to a wide audience and the first event organized by ID&T. Later in 1992, they organized the first Thunderdome party, which was titled The Thunder Dome, which was held on 3 October 1992 in Heerenveen.

In 1993, ID&T / Arcade Records started a Thunderdome compilation CD series with popular gabber music. ID&T sold other kinds of merchandise such as T-shirts, bomber jackets, caps and an energy drink (Thundertaste). The Thunderdome concept was considered important to the popularization and spreading of gabber music during the 1990s.

In late 1999, ID&T took a break from the Thunderdome concept and stopped producing the parties and CDs. The break lasted until 2001, when they resumed throwing parties and producing CDs. After the restart, one or two parties each year were held. In 2002, the concept for the party was the 10th anniversary of Thunderdome. A CD that was recorded live at the party and an anniversary DVD were released, both entitled Thunderdome: a Decade. In 2007, the three CD set XV: 15 Years Of Thunderdome was released in celebration of Thunderdome's 15th anniversary.

The December 2012 event was advertised as being the end of Thunderdome. An anniversary compilation album was also released. A press release for this album announced that: "It all comes full circle now. It's time to let Thunderdome become what it always has been: a legend."

On 3 November 2015, ID&T announced that while the Thunderdome concept was retired, they introduced a new similar event called "Thunderdome Die Hard Day" due to massive demand. The event took place on 5 December 2015. On 3 October 2016, the 24th anniversary of the first edition of Thunderdome, ID&T announced a second Die Hard Day event to take place on 3 December 2016 in Amsterdam.

At the Dominator Festival on 16 July 2016, a plane with a banner that read "25 Years of Thunderdome - See You in 2017" was seen flying over the festival grounds. The Thunderdome Facebook page uploaded a post that read "See you in 2017", which confirmed rumours about a 25th anniversary edition of Thunderdome. After Die Hard Day II, ID&T announced that the third edition would not happen in 2017 due to their preparations for the 25th anniversary edition of Thunderdome. Instead, Die Hard Day III was held on 27 October 2018, again in Amsterdam.

On 17 February 2017, ID&T released the trailer for the 25th anniversary of Thunderdome, which took place on 28 October 2017 at Jaarbeurs Utrecht.

On 24 July 2018, a plane flew over the festival grounds at the Dominator Festival again, similar to the 2016 festival, with a banner that read "Thunderdome - See you in 2019". This was followed up with a trailer uploaded to Thunderdome's YouTube channel on 30 January 2019, stating that the 2019 edition would take place at Jaarbeurs Utrecht on 26 October 2019.

On 14 October 2019, during the lead-up to the 2019 edition, Thunderdome released a trailer on their YouTube channel about an upcoming documentary titled Thunderdome Never Dies - The Full Story. The 82-minute documentary, produced in conjunction with Deep Thought Productions and 2CFilm, details the history and impact of Thunderdome, including its origins. The documentary was released in theatres in the Netherlands on 14 November 2019.

On 8 September 2021, Thunderdome released a short 10-second teaser on their YouTube channel announcing the 2021 edition of Thunderdome, due to take place on 11 December 2021 at Jaarbeurs Utrecht. A full 1-minute trailer was released on 6 October. This edition was subsequently postponed due to special event rules in the Netherlands following the COVID-19 pandemic. It took place on 10 December 2022 at Jaarbeurs Utrecht, celebrating the 30th anniversary of Thunderdome. An updated trailer was released on 10 August 2022.

== Events ==
=== In The Netherlands ===
- The Final Exam - Jaarbeurs in Utrecht - 20 June 1992
- Thunderdome I - Thialf in Heerenveen - 3 October 1992
- Thunderdome II - Frieslandhallen in Leeuwarden - 13 February 1993
- Thunderdome III - Statenhal in Den Haag - 13 March 1993
- Thunderdome IV - Thialf in Heerenveen - 3 April 1993
- Thunderdome V 'The Final Thunderdome' - Martinihal in Groningen - 8 May 1993
- Thunderdome - Martinihal in Groningen - 9 October 1993
- Thunderdome - Jaarbeurs in Utrecht - 27 November 1993
- Thunderdome Meets Multigroove - Fun Factory in Zaandam - 29 April 1995
- Thunderdome vs. Hellraiser - Sporthallen Zuid in Amsterdam - 26 August 1995
- Thunderdome '96 'Dance Or Die!' - Fec Expo in Leeuwarden - 20 April 1996
- Thunderdome @ Mysteryland - Jaarbeurs in Utrecht - 22 February 1997
- Thunderdome @ Mysteryland - Recreatieplas Bussloo in Bussloo - 4 July 1997
- Thunderdome 'Eastern Edition' - Expo Center in Hengelo - 29 November 1997
- Thunderdome - Fec Expo in Leeuwarden - 28 November 1998
- Thunderdome - Thialf in Heerenveen - 2 October 1999
- Thunderdome - Heineken Music Hall in Amsterdam - 25 August 2001
- Thunderdome 'A Decade' - Amsterdam RAI - 12 October 2002
- Thunderdome - Jaarbeurs in Utrecht - 25 October 2003
- Thunderdome - Jaarbeurs in Utrecht - 4 December 2004
- Thunderdome - Jaarbeurs in Utrecht - 3 December 2005
- Thunderdome - Jaarbeurs in Utrecht - 2 December 2006
- Thunderdome XV - Amsterdam RAI - 15 December 2007
- Thunderdome 'Payback Time' - Heineken Music Hall in Amsterdam - 24 May 2008
- Thunderdome - Jaarbeurs in Utrecht - 20 December 2008
- Thunderdome 'Fight Night' - Heineken Music Hall in Amsterdam - 23 May 2009
- Thunderdome 'Alles naar de kl#te' - Jaarbeurs in Utrecht - 19 December 2009
- Thunderdome 'Breaking Barriers' - Jaarbeurs in Utrecht - 18 December 2010
- Thunderdome 'Toxic Hotel' - Jaarbeurs in Utrecht - 17 December 2011
- Thunderdome XX 'The Final Exam' - Amsterdam RAI - 15 December 2012
- Thunderdome @ Mysteryland - Floriade in Haarlemmermeer - 26 & 27 August 2017
- Thunderdome '25 Years of Hardcore' - Jaarbeurs in Utrecht - 28 October 2017
- Thunderdome @ Mysteryland - Floriade in Haarlemmermeer - 25 & 26 August 2018
- Thunderdome @ Mysteryland - Floriade in Haarlemmermeer - 24 & 25 August 2019
- Thunderdome 'An ode to Gabber' - Jaarbeurs in Utrecht - 26 October 2019
- Thunderdome @ Mysteryland - Floriade in Haarlemmermeer - 27 & 28 August 2022
- Thunderdome XXX - Jaarbeurs in Utrecht - 10 December 2022
- Thunderdome @ Mysteryland - Floriade in Haarlemmermeer - 26 & 27 August 2023
- Thunderdome 'Xtreme Audio' - Jaarbeurs Utrecht - 9 December 2023
- Thunderdome ‘Move As One’ - Jaarbeurs in Utrecht - 13 December 2025

=== In other countries ===
- Thunderdome @ Planet Hardcore - Dendermonde - Belgium - 3 April 1994
- Thunderdome - Keulen Sporthalle Köln in Cologne, Germany - 11 July 1994
- Thunderdome @ Extreme - Affligem - Belgium - 16 December 1994
- Thunderdome - Oberhausen in Revierpark in Ruhr, Germany - 13 May 1995
- Thunderdome - Palau Vall D'Hebron in Barcelona, Spain - 23 June 1995
- Thunderdome - Midland Railway Workshops in Perth, Australia - 1 October 1995
- Thunderdome @ Club X - Wuustwezel - Belgium - 13 September 1996
- Thunderdome '96 Part 2 - Sportpaleis in Antwerpen, Belgium - 16 November 1996
- Thunderdome '97 'The Southern Edition' - Sportpaleis in Antwerpen, Belgium - 23 March 1997
- Thunderdome in Italy - Number One, Corte Franca (BS), Italy - 7 September 1997
- Global Hardcore Nation - Sportpaleis in Antwerpen, Belgium - 18 October 1997
- Thunderdome @ Cherry Moon - Lokeren - Belgium - 31 October 1997
- Global Hardcore Nation: The Cosmic Journey - Sportpaleis in Antwerpen, Belgium - 7 February 1998
- Thunderdome @ Nature One in Hasselbach, Germany - 1 August 2008
- Thunderdome @ Nature One in Hasselbach, Germany - 1 August 2009
- Thunderdome @ Nature One in Hasselbach, Germany - 31 July 2010
- Global Hardcore Nation @ Tomorrowland in Boom, Belgium - 21 July 2017
- Thunderdome on Tour @ Tomorrowland in Boom, Belgium - 22 July 2018
- Thunderdome 2024 'Omega / Alpha' - Sportpaleis in Antwerpen, Belgium - 13 & 14 December 2024

== Albums ==
The Thunderdome CD series began in 1993. Originally, the CD albums were released by Arcade Records. According to ID&T and Arcade, "more than 1.500.000 Thunderdome albums" had been sold worldwide by 1995. In 2000, no album was released since ID&T took a break from the Thunderdome concept. From 2001 onwards, the albums were released by ID&T's own record label, and, from 2004 onwards, by Universal In 2008, the series was handed over to Dance-Tunes.

In 1998, there was an attempt to launch a separate Thunderdome series in the US under the Arcade America label, but only one album was released.

=== Main series ===
- Thunderdome - F*ck Mellow This Is Hardcore From Hell (1993)
- Thunderdome II - Back From Hell! (Judgement Day) (1993)
- Thunderdome III - The Nightmare Is Back (1993) reached number 4 in the Swiss Music Charts for compilations
- Thunderdome IV - The Devil's Last Wish (1993) reached number 3 in the Austrian Music Charts for compilations and number 4 in the Swiss Music Charts for compilations
- Thunderdome V - The Fifth Nightmare (1994) reached number 5 in the Austrian music charts for compilations and number 4 in the Swiss compilation charts
- Thunderdome VI - From Hell To Earth (1994) reached number 9 in the Swiss compilation charts
- Thunderdome VII - Injected With Poison (1994) reached number 8 in the Swiss compilation charts
- Thunderdome VIII - The Devil In Disguise (1995) reached number 6 in the Swiss compilation charts
- Thunderdome IX - Revenge Of The Mummy (1995) reached number 6 in the Austrian compilation charts and number 4 in the Swiss compilation charts
- Thunderdome X - Sucking For Blood (1995) peaked at number 6 in the Austrian compilation charts and number 5 in the Swiss charts
- Thunderdome XI - The Killing Playground (1995) peaked at number 7 in the Austrian compilation charts and number 6 in the Swiss compilation charts
- Thunderdome XII - Caught In The Web Of Death (1996) peaked at number 5 in the Austrian compilation charts and number 4 in the Swiss compilation charts
- Thunderdome XIII - The Joke's On You (1996) peaked at number 6 in the Swiss compilation charts
- Thunderdome XIV - Death Becomes You (1996) peaked at number 8 in the Swiss compilation charts
- Thunderdome XV - The Howling Nightmare (1996) Reached number 63 in the Dutch Top 100 Albums
- Thunderdome XVI - The Galactic Cyberdeath (1997)
- Thunderdome XVII - Messenger Of Death (1997)
- Thunderdome XVIII - Psycho Silence (1997)
- Thunderdome XIX - Cursed By Evil Sickness (1997)
- Thunderdome XX (1998)
- Thunderdome XXI (1998)
- Thunderdome XXII (1998)
- Thunderdome - Hardcore Rules The World (1999)
- Thunderdome - Past, Present, Future (1999)
- Thunderdome 2001 a.k.a. Harder Than Hard (2001)
- Thunderdome 2001 Part 2 (2001)
- Thunderdome 2002 (2002)
- Thunderdome 2003 Part 1 (2003)
- Thunderdome 2003 Part 2 (2003)
- Thunderdome 2nd Gen Part 1 (2004)
- Thunderdome 2005-1 (2005)
- Thunderdome 2006 (2006)
- Thunderdome 2007 (2007)
- Thunderdome XV (2008) Highest placement in the Dutch Compilation Top 30: 5
- Thunderdome (2008) Highest placement in the Dutch Compilation Top 30: 8
- Thunderdome Fight Night (2009) Highest placement in the Dutch Compilation Top 30: 14
- Thunderdome - Alles naar de klote (2009) Highest placement in the Dutch Compilation Top 30: 11
- Thunderdome - Pure and Powerful Hardcore (2010) Highest place in the Dutch Compilation Top 30: 9
- Thunderdome - Toxic Hotel (2011) Highest place in the Dutch Compilation Top 30: 8
- Thunderdome - The Final Exam - 20 Years Of Hardcore (2012) Highest place in the Dutch Compilation Top 30: 3
- Thunderdome - The Golden Series (2014)
- Thunderdome - 25 Years of Hardcore (2017)
- Thunderdome 2019 (2019)
- Thunderdome - High Voltage (2020)
- Thunderdome 2021 (2021)
- Thunderdome XXX - Celebrating 30 Years Of Hardcore (2022)
- Thunderdome - Xtreme Audio (2023)
- Thunderdome 2024 - Omega / Alpha (2024)

=== Special CDs ===
- Thunderdome (DREAMTEAM Productions / DURECO 1158012)
- Thunderdome - Thunderticket '93 (1993)
- Thunderdome (TOTAL RECALL RECORDS) / Distributed by: SPV GmbH (Germany), ECHO MUSIC (Austria), TBA S.A. (Switzerland)
- Thunderdome - The Megamix Of Thunderdome 1-5! (1994) reached number 5 in the Austrian Music Charts for compilations
- Thunderdome - The X-mas Edition (1994)
- Thunderdome - Hardcore Will Never Die (The Best Of) (1995) reached number 10 in the Swiss Music Charts for compilations
- Thunderdome Australian Tour Vol 1 - Thunder Down-under (1995)
- Thunderdome '96 - Dance Or Die! (Live Recorded at FEC-Expo Center Leeuwarden 20.04.96) (1996) reached number 9 in the Swiss Music Charts for compilations
- Thunderdome - The Best Of (1996)
- Thunderdome '97 (1997)
- Thunderdome - The Best Of '97 (1997)
- Thunderdome Live Presents Global Hardcore Nation (1997)
- Thunderdome Live - Recorded at Mystery Land The 4th of July 1998 (1998)
- Thunderdome - The Best Of '98 (1998)
- Thunderdome - The Essential '92-'99 Collection (1999)
- Thunderdome - A Decade Live (2002)
- Thunderdome Turntablized : Mixed by Unexist (2004)
- Thunderdome: Die Hard (2015)
- Thunderdome: Die Hard II (2016)
- Thunderdome - Promo 'The Ultimate Megamix' (2016)
- Thunderdome: Die Hard III (2018)

=== Vinyl releases ===
- The Dreamteam - Thunderdome (Dreamteam Productions)
- Thunderdome III (Arcade)
- Thunderdome - The Fuckin Megamix
- DJ Dano - Thunderdome IV4 EP (Dreamteam Productions)
- F. Salee - Thunderdome IV EP (Dreamteam Productions)
- DJ Buzz Fuzz - Thunderdome IV4 EP (Dreamteam Productions)
- The Prophet - Thunderdome IV EP (Dreamteam Productions)
- The Dreamteam - Thunderdome Remix EP (Dreamteam Productions)
- Thunderdome IV4 The Megamixes (Total Recall)
- Thunderdome IV The Megamixes -Picture Disc- (Total Recall)
- Thunderdome V The Megamixes (Total Recall)
- Thunderdome VI Sampler (ID&T Records)
- Thunderdome VI Megamix (ID&T Records)
- Thunderdome VII Sampler (ID&T Records)
- Thunderdome VII Megamix (ID&T Records)
- Thunderdome Winter Experience (ID&T Records)
- Thunderdome VIII Sampler (ID&T Records)
- Thunderdome VIIII Sampler (ID&T Records)
- Thunderdome IX Sampler (ID&T Records)
- Thunderdome X Sampler (ID&T Records)
- Thunderdome The Unreleased Projects (ID&T Records)
- Thunderdome '96 - The Thunder Anthems (ID&T Records)
- Thunderdome '98 - Hardcore Rules The World (ID&T Records)
- Korsakoff - The Powerrave Experience (Stardom - Thunderdome 2004 Anthem) (Pro Artist Management)
- Thunderdome 2006 (Thunderdome Records)
- Promo & MC Drokz - Thunderdome 2007 Anthem / 3 Steps Ahead - Remember Remixes (The Third Movement)
- DJ Mad Dog & MC Justice - Payback Time (The Official Thunderdome Anthem) (Traxtorm Records)
- Endymion & Nosferatu - Act Of God (Thunderdome 08 Anthem) (Thunderdome Records)
- Thunderdome Fight Night: The Thunderdome Fight Night Anthems 2009 (Thunderdome Records)
- Neophyte & Drokz - Sloop Die Speakers! (Thunderdome 2009 Anthem) (Thunderdome Records)
- Negative A Ft. MC Justice - Breaking Barriers (Thunderdome Anthem 2010) (Thunderdome Records)
- Neophyte & Promo Ft. MINCKZ - TD Is You (Thunderdome Records)
- DJ Promo - Thunder in my Heart (The Third Movement)
- Thunderdome Never Dies - Official Soundtrack (The Third Movement)
- Mad Dog – Xtreme Audio (Official Thunderdome 2023 Anthem) (Thunderdome Music)

=== Reception ===
When the first Thunderdome album was re-released in 2010, Ben Martijn (a new member of Party Animals) wrote a favorable review on the FOK! website closing with the words "[the album is] full of history and indispensable in the collection of a real hardcore fan!"

Allmusic gave Thunderdome: The Best of '98 3/5 stars.

== Songs that make references to Thunderdome ==
Because of the popularity of the Thunderdome concept, some artists have made tributes to it in their songs. These are some examples:

- 3 Steps Ahead - This is the Thunderdome ("This is the Thunderdome")
- 3 Steps Ahead - Thunderdome till we Die ("Don't you believe we're in Thunderdome till we die")
- DJ Dano - Welcome To The Thunderdome ("Welcome To Another Edition Of Thunderdome")
- E-Rick & Tactic - Hardcore Rules the World ("Welcome to Thunderdome '98")
- E-Rick & Tactic - Meet her at Thunderdome (Samples obviously taken from Mad Max Beyond Thunderdome because they contain the word "Thunderdome")
- DJ Mad Dog And MC Justice - Payback Time ("For all the fuckers and bitches that left us behind! This is thunderdome!")
- DJ Promo - Feel the Thunder ("We never stop give you what you want, we never stop give you what you need, Thunderdome, under makes me wonder, feel the bass, there will be no escape, check it, Thunderdome")
- Gabbaheads - I'm a Thunderdome Baby ("I'm a Thunderdome baby, so now you can hear me")
- Gabber Piet - Gabber Mack ("Shave your head down to the bone, raving at the Thunderdome")
- Hakkûhbar - Supergabber (Extended Mix) ("De 52ste staat van Amerika, Thunderdome, Thunderdome zeker weten!")
- Neophyte & Promo - TD Is You (feat. Minckz) ("Are you ready for the ultimate Thunderdome?!"/"Thunderdome is hardcore. Thunderdome is you.")
- The Prophet, Gizmo, Dano & Buzz Fuzz - Thunderdome '93 ("We will take you on a trip into thunder. Thunderdome!")
- Yellow Claw & The Opposites - Thunder ("Dit is Thunderdome!")
- Guerrillas - Our Legacy ("This is our legacy - Thunderdome.")
- Dither - To The Death ("We live, we die in the Thunderdome!")
- N-Vitral - Enter The Dome ("This is where our legacy began, the thunder")
- Nightshift, Da Mouth of Madness - Made it to Thunderdome ("Then it strikes me, we made it to Thunderdome!")
- Joost Klein - Filthy Dog (Schweinhund) ("But the German guy wants to gabber at the Thunderdome")
- Painbringer- Real Thunder ("Thunderdome.")

== See also ==
- List of electronic music festivals
- ID&T
- Gabber music
- Hardcore techno
