= Back in My Life =

1999 single by Alice Deejay

Single by Alice Deejay

from the album Who Needs Guitars Anyway?
- Released: 22 November 1999
- Length: 3:30
- Label: Violent
- Songwriters: Pronti, Kalmani
- Producers: Pronti, Kalmani

Alice Deejay singles chronology
"Better Off Alone" (1998)	"Back in My Life" (1999)	"Will I Ever" (2000)

Music video
- "Back in My Life" on YouTube

"Back in My Life" is a song by Dutch musical group Alice Deejay and produced by Wessel van Diepen, Dennis van den Driesschen, Sebastiaan Molijn and Eelke Kalberg (Pronti & Kalmani). It was released in November 1999 as the second single from the album, Who Needs Guitars Anyway?. The song reached number one in Norway and the top 10 in Finland, Ireland, Netherlands, Sweden, and the United Kingdom.

== Release ==
"Back in My Life" was released in the United Kingdom on 22 November 1999. There are two music videos: one that has full funeral scenes, and one on a cliff top that has more dancing scenes.

== Chart performance ==
"Back in My Life" was almost as successful as "Better Off Alone" in certain countries. It reached number one in Norway and number 27 on the US Dance Club Play chart. The single also performed well in the United Kingdom, peaking at number four in November 1999 and reaching number two in Scotland.

== Track listing ==
CD maxi - Europe

1. "Back in My Life" (Hitradio Full Vocal) - 3:25
2. "Back in My Life" (Pronti & Kalmani Club Dub) - 6:04
3. "Back in My Life" (DJ Jam X & De Leon's DuMonde Mix) - 6:58
4. "Back in My Life" (Extended Hitradio Full Vocal) - 5:35
5. "Back in My Life" (Extended Hitradio Instrumental) - 5:35

== Charts ==
=== Weekly charts ===
Weekly chart performance for "Back in My Life"
Chart (1999–2000)	Peak position
Australia (ARIA)	19
Austria (Ö3 Austria Top 40)	28
Belgium (Ultratop 50 Flanders)	11
Belgium (Ultratop 50 Wallonia)	12
Canada (Nielsen SoundScan)	14
Canada Dance/Urban (RPM)	2
Denmark (IFPI)	2
Europe (Eurochart Hot 100)	4
Europe Border Breakers (Music & Media)	5
European Radio Top 50 (Music & Media)	20
Finland (Suomen virallinen lista)	10
France (SNEP)	11
Germany (GfK)	17
Hungary (Mahasz)	5
Iceland (Íslenski Listinn Topp 40)	18
Ireland (IRMA)	5
Ireland Dance (IRMA)	1
Italy (Musica e dischi)	20
Netherlands (Dutch Top 40)	4
Netherlands (Single Top 100)	5
Norway (VG-lista)	1
Romania (Romanian Top 100)	7
Scottish Singles Sales (Official Charts)	2
Sweden (Sverigetopplistan)	4
Switzerland (Schweizer Hitparade)	19
UK Singles (Official Charts)	4
UK Dance (Official Charts)	6
US Dance Club Songs (Billboard)	26
US Dance Singles Sales (Billboard)	27

=== Year-end charts ===
1999 year-end chart performance for "Back in My Life"
Chart (1999)	Position
Netherlands (Dutch Top 40)	61
Netherlands (Single Top 100)	74
UK Singles (OCC)	54
UK Pop (Music Week)	4

2000 year-end chart performance for "Back in My Life"
Chart (2000)	Position
Belgium (Ultratop 50 Wallonia)	80
Denmark (IFPI)	48
Europe (Eurochart Hot 100)	51
France (SNEP)	97
Ireland (IRMA)	74
Romania (Romanian Top 100)	76
Sweden (Hitlistan)	73
UK Singles (OCC)	147

== Certifications ==
Certifications and sales for "Back in My Life"
Region	Certification	Certified units/sales
France (SNEP)	Gold	250,000^{*}
Norway (IFPI Norway)	Gold	
Sweden (GLF)	Gold	15,000^{^}
United Kingdom (BPI)	Gold	400,000^{^}
^{*} Sales figures based on certification alone.^{^} Shipments figures based on certification alone.

== Release history ==
Release dates and formats for "Back in My Life"
Region	Date	Format(s)	Label(s)	Ref(s).
United Kingdom	22 November 1999	12-inch vinyl; CD; cassette	Positiva; Violent	
United States	15 August 2000	Contemporary hit radio	Republic; Universal	
