= Alice Deejay =

Dutch dance music band

- Origin: Amsterdam, Netherlands
- Genres: Eurotrance; Eurodance; pop
- Years active: 1998–2002; 2021–2024
- Label: Violent
- Past members: Judith Anna Pronk; Yutin; Angelique Versnel; Mila Levesque
- Website: alicedeejay.com

Alice Deejay was a Dutch Eurodance project founded and produced by Wessel van Diepen, Dennis van den Driesschen (Danski & Delmundo, Vengaboys), Sebastiaan Molijn, and Eelke Kalberg (Pronti & Kalmani), also featuring Sven Maes and Johan Gielen (Svenson & Gielen). It was fronted by singer Judith Anna Pronk and originally with dancers Mila Levesque and Yutin, who later was replaced by Angelique Versnel. They are best known for their 1998 single "Better Off Alone", which was a worldwide success, selling over two million singles worldwide.

== History ==
Formed in 1997, Alice Deejay launched their career with their debut single, "Better Off Alone", credited as DJ Jurgen presents Alice Deejay. The song reached the top 10 in many European countries and also charted in North America. In the UK, the song was platinum and reached number 2 on the UK Singles Chart, and number 3 on the US Billboard Hot Dance Music/Club Play, also reaching number 27 on the US Billboard Hot 100. Their second single, "Back in My Life", was released in November 1999 and reached number one in Norway and the top 10 in Denmark, Finland, Ireland, the Netherlands, Sweden, and the United Kingdom.

The project's only album was Who Needs Guitars Anyway?, released in March 2000. It entered the top ten of the UK Albums Chart. They released three more singles from the album, "Will I Ever", "The Lonely One", and "Celebrate Our Love", all of which reached the top 20 in the United Kingdom. Pronk, together with backing singers, toured dance-themed venues to perform live. In 2002, this line-up made their final appearance together.

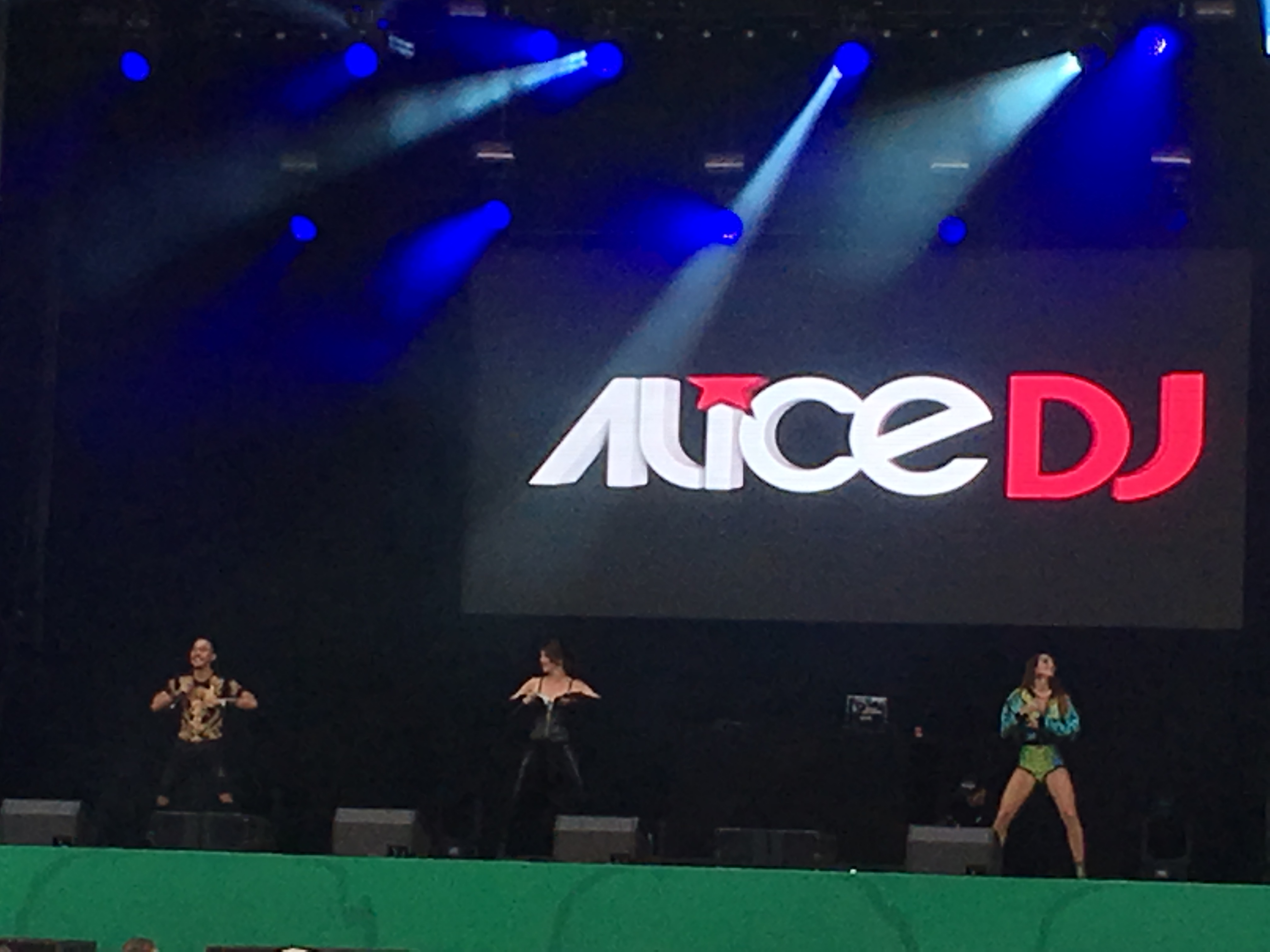
The revived Alice DJ performing in the Netherlands in 2018

=== First revival ===
After more than a decade of inactivity, in 2014 the producers who originally launched Alice Deejay revived the group with new vocalist Ilona, a Dutch singer and DJ. The new lineup slightly changed its name to "Alice DJ" and began touring.

=== Reunion tour ===
Twenty years after her last performance as Alice Deejay, in October 2021 the group announced that Pronk would be returning, with several tour dates scheduled across Europe for the remainder of the year.

On 16 October 2021, Pronk returned as Alice Deejay live on stage for the first time in 20 years at the Ethias Arena in Belgium. She made her final appearance on stage at Kubix Festival on 14 December 2024 in Newcastle upon Tyne, England.

== Production ==
The project was founded and produced by Danski (Dennis van den Driesschen) and Delmundo (Wessel van Diepen), along with their protégés Pronti (Sebastiaan Molijn) and Kalmani (Eelke Kalberg).

== Discography ==
=== Studio albums ===
List of studio albums, with selected chart positions and certifications
| Title | Album details | Peak chart positions | | | | | | | | | | Certifications |
| Title | Album details | NLD | FIN | FRA | GER | IRL | NOR | SWE | SWI | UK | US | Certifications |
|---|---|---|---|---|---|---|---|---|---|---|---|---|
| Who Needs Guitars Anyway? | Released: 28 March 2000; Label: Republic; Formats: CD, LP, digital download | 27 | 7 | 45 | 28 | 8 | 14 | 24 | 12 | 8 | 76 | BPI: Gold |

=== Singles ===
List of singles, with selected chart positions and certifications, showing year released and album name
| Title | Year | Peak chart positions | | | | | | | | | | Certifications | Album |
| Title | Year | NLD | AUS | FRA | GER | IRL | NOR | SWE | SWI | UK | US | Certifications | Album |
|---|---|---|---|---|---|---|---|---|---|---|---|---|---|
| "Better Off Alone" | 1998 | 9 | 4 | 6 | 32 | 3 | 3 | 5 | 28 | 2 | 27 | ARIA: Gold; BPI: 2× Platinum; IFPI SWE: Gold; SNEP: Gold | Who Needs Guitars Anyway? |
| "Back in My Life" | 1999 | 4 | 19 | 11 | 17 | 5 | 1 | 4 | 19 | 4 | — | BPI: Gold; IFPI NOR: Gold; IFPI SWE: Gold; SNEP: Silver | Who Needs Guitars Anyway? |
| "Will I Ever" | 2000 | 8 | 65 | 37 | 33 | 8 | 16 | 10 | 25 | 7 | — | BPI: Silver | Who Needs Guitars Anyway? |
| "The Lonely One" | 2000 | 19 | 82 | 60 | 59 | 32 | — | 24 | 72 | 16 | — | | Who Needs Guitars Anyway? |
| "Celebrate Our Love" | 2001 | 25 | — | 71 | 71 | 44 | — | 33 | 85 | 17 | — | | Who Needs Guitars Anyway? |
| "Who Needs Guitars Anyway?" | 2001 | — | — | — | — | — | — | — | — | — | — | | Who Needs Guitars Anyway? |
| "Hitmix" (EP) | 2010 | — | — | — | — | — | — | — | — | — | — | | Non-album single |
"—" denotes a recording that did not chart or was not released in that territory.
