= DJ Jurgen =

- Born: Jürgen Rijkers; 13 February 1967 (age 59); Delft, Netherlands
- Genres: Dance
- Occupations: DJ, remixer, producer
- Website: djjurgen.com

Jürgen Rijkers (born 13 February 1967), better known by his stage name DJ Jurgen, is a Dutch DJ, remixer and producer. He was the co-creator of Alice Deejay, and their biggest hit, "Better Off Alone", was credited to "DJ Jurgen presents Alice Deejay". As a solo artist, he also had an international hit with "Higher and Higher", which peaked at number 34 on Billboard's Dance Club Songs chart in 2000. Currently, Jurgen hosts the morning show on Wild FM.

== Discography ==
=== Singles ===
List of singles, with selected chart positions
Title	Year	Peak chart positions
Title	Year	AUS
"Higher and Higher"	2000	75
