= Sensation (event) =

Music event in Europe

- Sensation 2009 in Amsterdam
- Genre: Electronic dance music
- Locations: Amsterdam, Netherlands (origin)
- Years active: 2000–2022
- Founders: ID&T
- Capacity: different
- Website: Official website

Sensation is an indoor electronic dance music event which originated in Amsterdam, Netherlands, and organized by ID&T. The original event, which ran exclusively in the Amsterdam Arena for a period of five years until 2005, is now located throughout various European and a few non-European countries.

== History ==
In 2000 and 2001 there were single events simply known as Sensation. Later Sensation was expanded into two annual events known as Sensation Black and Sensation White. Sensation Black focuses more on 'darker' music, like Hardstyle and Hardcore, whereas Sensation White focuses more on trance music. Every year, Sensation also releases two doublediscs (Black and White) and two singles they call the Anthem. in 2007 the names of both events changed: "Sensation" (formerly "Sensation White"), and "Black" (formerly "Sensation Black").

The first edition of Sensation, in 2000, did not sell out. The media announced that it was sold out in order to boost interest in the event, which eventually attracted 23,000 people. In this first edition, the DJs only used one side of the Amsterdam Arena as the stage. Later editions have the stage in the middle. This Sensation was the only one that did not have a dress code. All subsequent editions of Sensation White have sold out, usually well in advance (usually all 45,000 tickets are sold in a few hours). Sensation Black has not been as successful, but is usually either close to selling out, or sold out a few days before the event.

In 2005, Sensation White was also held in Belgium and Germany. In 2006, ID&T started Sensation International, an international tour based on the simplified version which could be seen in the Amsterdam ArenA, in 2005. The first edition was held in the Antwerp Sportpaleis. In 2008 Sensation White was held at SCC Peterburgsky in Saint Petersburg, and a New Year version was held at the Telstra Dome in Melbourne on 31 December 2008 (38,380 attendance).

In 2017, it was announced that this was to be the last Sensation to take place in Amsterdam, with all future editions to be held outside of Holland. Titled 'The Final', the last Amsterdam event took place on Saturday 8 July (breaking with the tradition of always taking place on the first Saturday of July) and the venue was sold-out with 50,000 tickets sold. A new event was held in 2022, five years later.

== Sensation (formerly known as Sensation White) ==
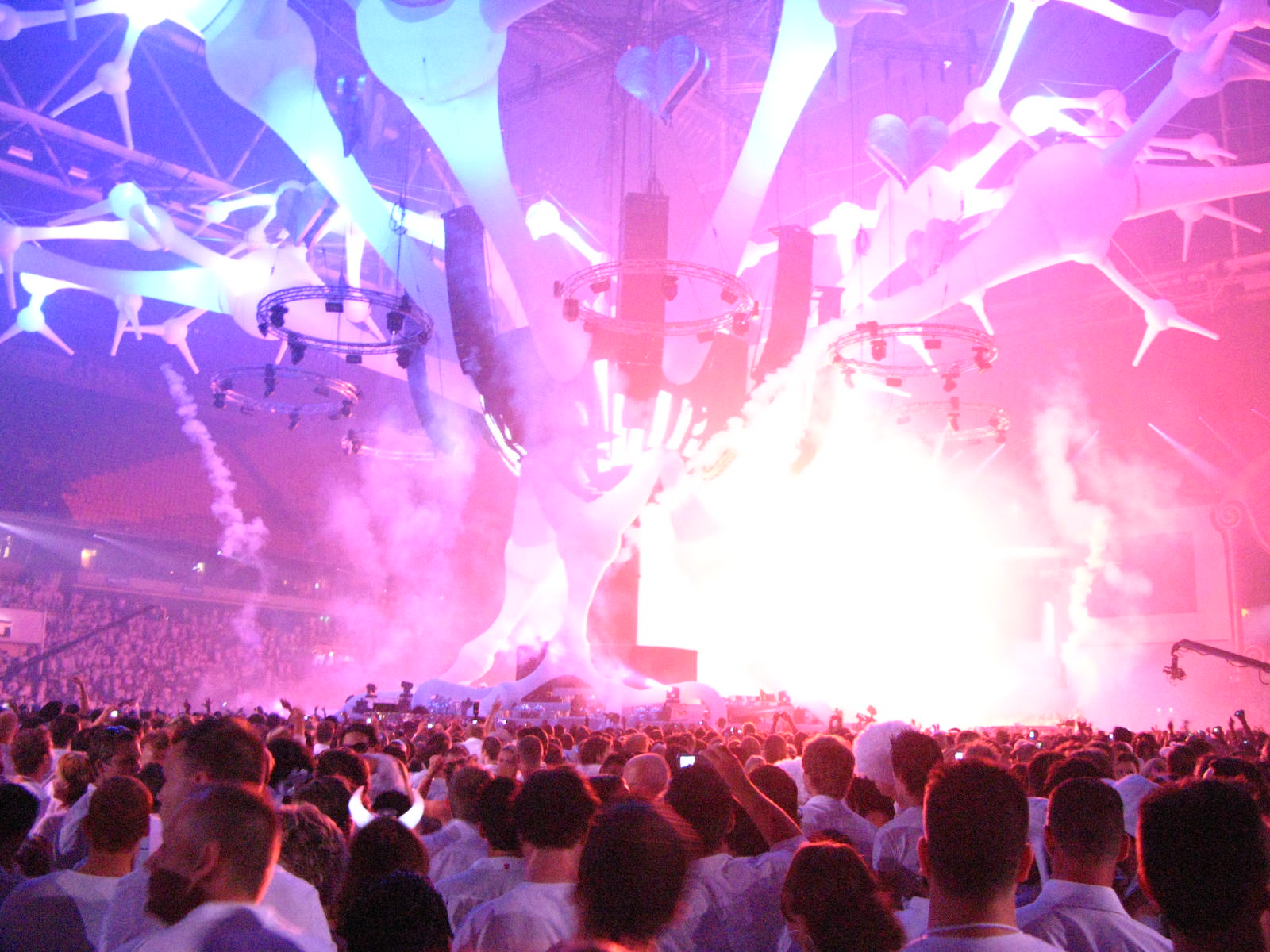
Sensation 2007

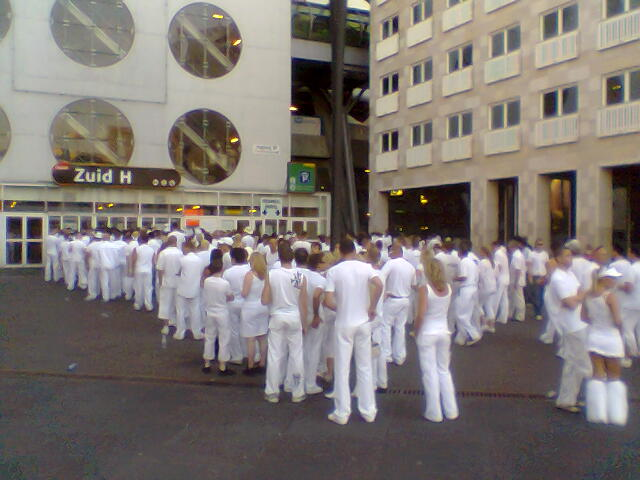
Attendees dressed in white

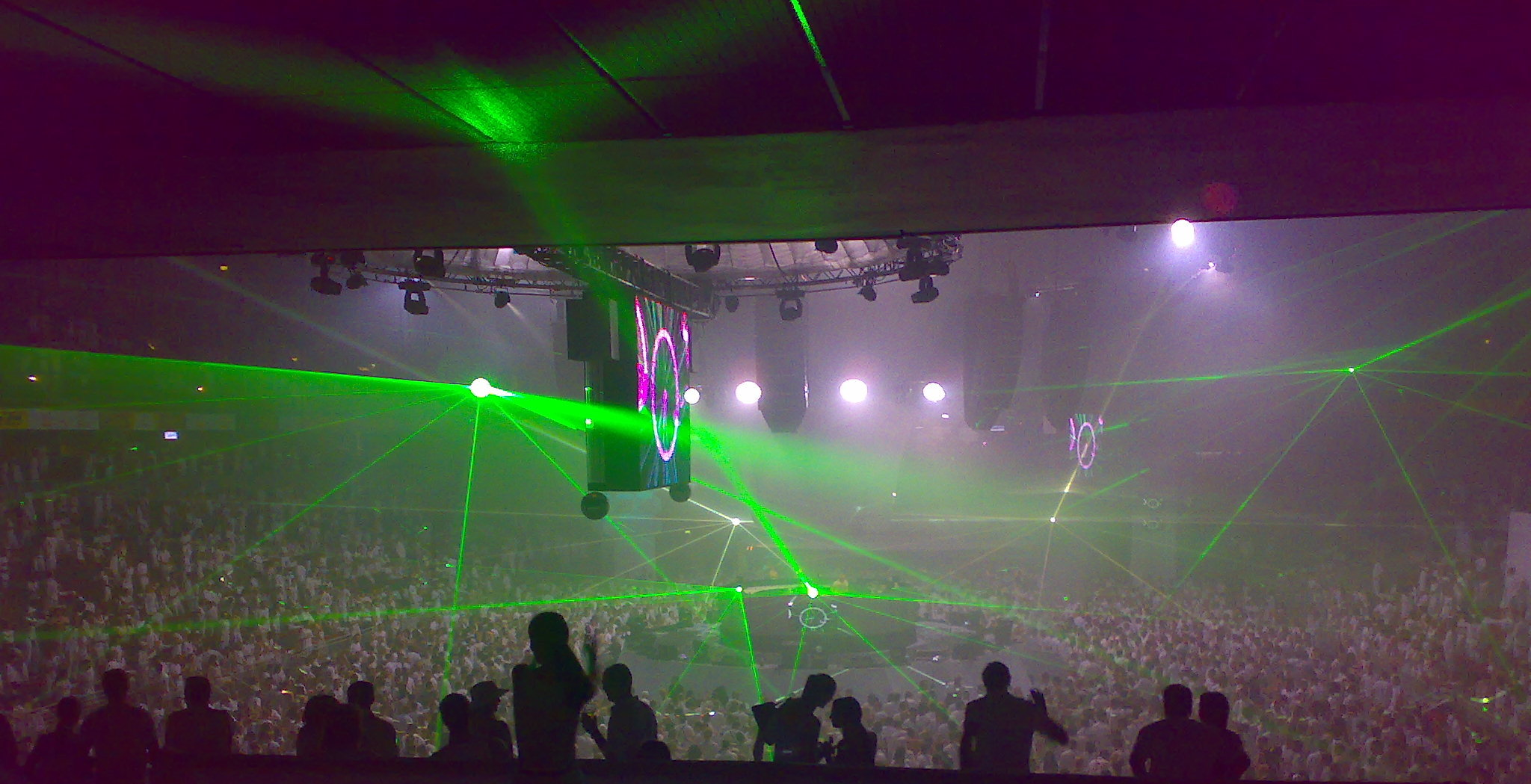
Sensation 2007 Latvia

Sensation White used to be a trance event, but in later years it became a house music event. All the attendees are required to wear white and the Amsterdam ArenA itself is decorated to match. Sensation White's slogan is "Be Part Of The Night – Dress in White". Every event has around 40,000–45,000 tickets available. The Amsterdam ArenA event takes place every year on the first Saturday in July while the German event in the LTU Arena in Düsseldorf is held on New Year's Eve. In 2009 it was organized for the first time on two subsequent nights on 3 and 4 July in the Amsterdam Arena where the opening of the Wicked Wonderland took place.

Notable DJs that have appeared at Sensation include Tiësto, Armin van Buuren, Swedish House Mafia, Hardwell, Martin Garrix, Nicky Romero, Afrojack, André Tanneberger, Darren Emerson (formerly of Underworld), David Guetta, NERVO, Dimitri Vegas & Like Mike, Erick E, Erick Morillo, Ferry Corsten, Marco V, Paul van Dyk, Sven Väth, Johan Gielen, Sander Kleinenberg, Steve Angello, Fedde Le Grand, Sebastian Ingrosso, Sander van Doorn, Mason, Felix da Housecat, Chuckie, Laidback Luke, Tocadisco, Rank 1, DJ Jean, Judge Jules, Carl Cox, Martin Solveig, Dada Life, and Acraze.

In 2010 Sensation came up with the theme "Celebrate Life with House", to enforce the notion that they are now a House event. It featured performances by Chuckie, Swedish House Mafia, Sunnery James & Ryan Marciano, and Joris Voorn & 2000 And One.

== BLACK (formerly known as Sensation Black) ==
The music of this event builds up from hard trance, hardstyle to hardcore. Sensation Black is held in the second weekend of July. All attendees are required to dress completely in black.

Notable DJs that have appeared at Sensation Black include Showtek, Angerfist, Headhunterz, Marcel Woods, Chris Liebing, DJ Lady Dana, DJ Luna, DJ Zany, The Prophet, Technoboy, Tommyknocker, Yoji Biomehanika and Mauro Picotto.

Rob Gee's band performed at Sensation Black 2006. The attendees were not enthusiastic about this, and around 2:15, things got out of hand. One of the partygoers climbed onto the stage and hit Rob Gee in the head. The other band members pounced on the young man and punched and kicked him in the head multiple times. Gee sustained no injuries and reacted calmly to the incident: "That boy stormed onto the stage and attacked me. I immediately thought of the murder of my friend and former Pantera guitarist Darrell Abbott. He was shot on stage by a concertgoer."

The last and final edition of the festival was held in 2012.

== Awards and nominations ==
=== International Dance Music Awards ===
| Year | Category | Work | Result | Ref. |
|---|---|---|---|---|
| 2006 | Best Music Event | Sensation White – Amsterdam, Netherlands | Nominated | |
| 2008 | Best Music Event | Sensation White – Amsterdam, Netherlands | Nominated | |
| 2009 | Best Music Event | Sensation White – Amsterdam, Netherlands | Nominated | |
| 2010 | Best Music Event | Sensation White – Amsterdam, Netherlands | Nominated | |
| 2011 | Best Music Event | Sensation White – Amsterdam, Netherlands | Nominated | |
| 2012 | Best Music Event | Sensation White – Amsterdam, Netherlands | Nominated | |
| 2013 | Best Music Event | Sensation White – Amsterdam, Netherlands | Nominated | |

== See also ==
- List of electronic music festivals

== Sources ==
- Official World-wide Site
