= Johan Gielen =

Belgian musical artist (born 1968)

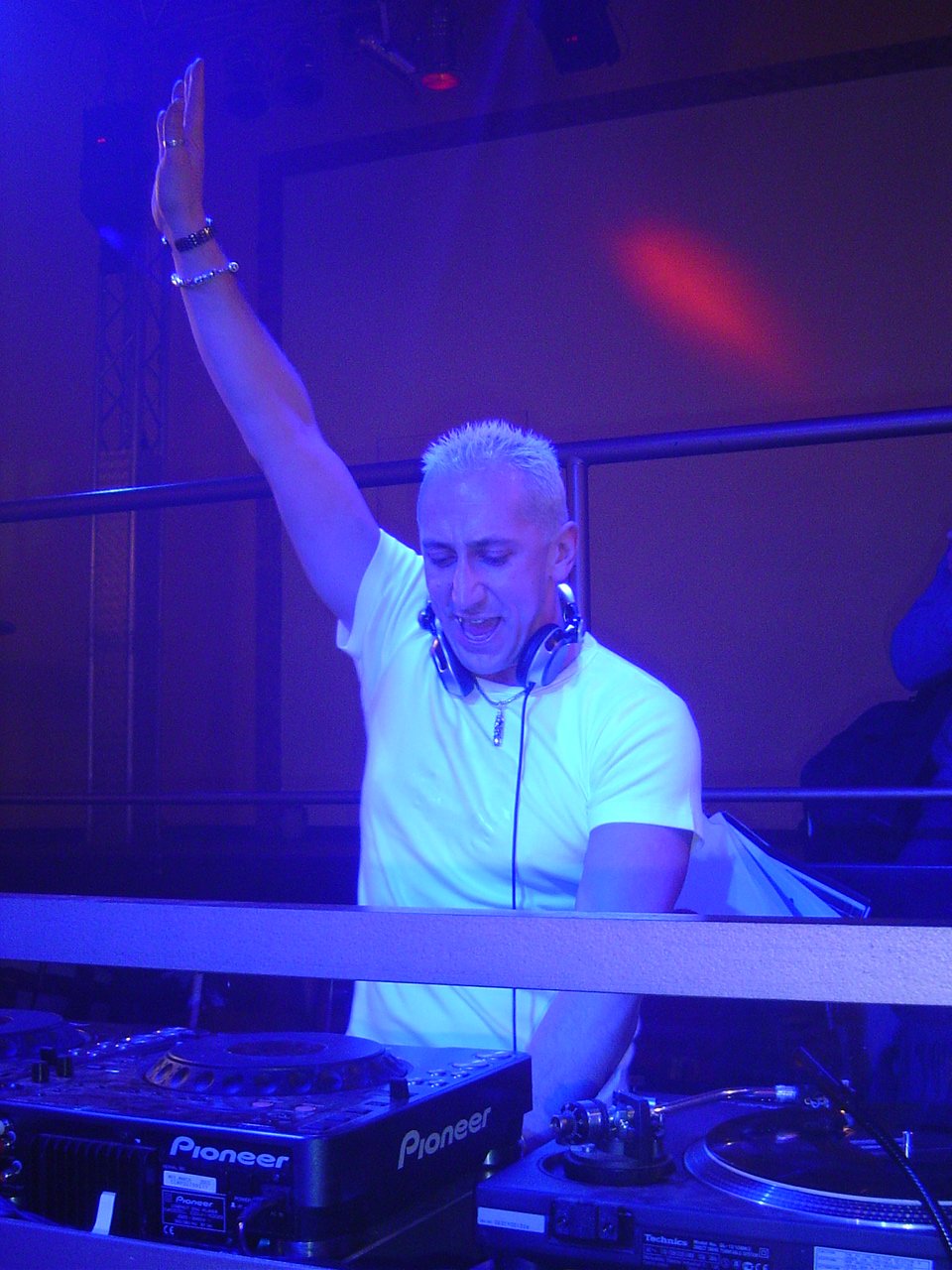
- Gielen in 2004

Background information
- Also known as: DJ Don; Don Joan; Airscape
- Born: Johan Gielen; 23 February 1968 (age 58); Mol, Belgium
- Genres: Trance
- Years active: 1992–present
- Label: Black Hole Recordings
- Member of: Airscape
- Website: www.johangielen.com

Johan Gielen (Dutch pronunciation: [ˈjoːɦɑŋ ˈɣilə(n)]; (Note: Johan in isolation: [ˈjoːɦɑn].) born 23 February 1968) is a Belgian trance musician, DJ, and remixer.

== Early years ==
Johan started DJing at the age of 17 in his home country of Belgium. During the latest 15 years, he has built up international fame spinning as a DJ in Japan, Australia, Germany, Spain, Netherlands, Belgium, England, Northern Ireland, Israel, North Cyprus and now also as resident DJ at Club Gorgeous in Copenhagen, Denmark.

Besides DJing, Johan is a trance producer working with partner Sven Maes. Johan and Sven are behind European smash hits from Airscape, Balearic Bill, Des Mitchell, Abnea, Svenson & Gielen. Furthermore, they are well known for their remixing skills which can be heard on productions by Chicane, Delerium, Vengaboys, Tiësto, Scooter, Boy George a.o. They have proven that they are also capable of creating commercial dance hits, after finishing a single for Alice DeeJay. He also partnered with Oliver Adams to form Blue Bamboo, which scored an international hit with "ABC & D", in 1994.

After nearly two years of warming up the Saturday night party people by broadcasting his weekly radio show "Lift Off" on ID&T, he decided to leave the station in favor of Fresh FM where he hosts a weekly show called "In Session" every Saturday from 21:00 to 23:00 CET.

In 2005 Gielen was rated along with dozens of other internationally known DJs. At that time Gielen was placed at number 57 (in the world).

== Discography ==
=== Albums (solo) ===
- 2006 Revelations
- 2009 Tech Liberty (as DJ Don with DJ Stay Puft) [Faada]
- 2010 Now And Then (as Airscape) [Black Hole Recordings]

=== Singles (solo) ===
- 1998 'Keep Pumpin' It Up' (as DJ Don, with The Party Zone) [Dance Opera]
- 2000 'Velvet Moods' (with Abnea) [Big Star Records]
- 2000 'We Move Like Shadows' [Telica/Big Star Records]
- 2005 'Flash/Dreamchild' [Tunes for You/Maximal Recordings]
- 2005 'For You' [Moist]
- 2005 'Show Me What You Got' [Tunes for You]
- 2006 'Physical Overdrive' [Tunes for You]
- 2007 'Revelations' [Tunes for You]
- 2007 'Magnitude' [Tunes for You]
- 2007 'Okinawa Sunset' [Tunes for You/Maelstrom]
- 2008 'Live It Up 2008' (Johan Gielen vs. Time Bandits) [VISCO Productions]
- 2009 'My Love' feat. JES (as Airscape) [Tunes for You]
- 2009 'Repeat The Music' [Magik Muzik]
- 2010 'These Are My People' [Magik Muzik]
- 2010 'I'm Lonely' (Johan Gielen pres. Hollis P. Monroe) [Magik Muzik]
- 2010 'Skyscraper/Mirage' (Johan Gielen vs. Tetsuya) [Black Hole Recordings]
- 2010 'Jonko' [Magik Muzik]
- 2019 'Say My Name' [High Contrast Recordings]

=== Compilations ===
- 2000 Academy of Trance, Vol. 1[Big Star Records]
- 2000 In Trance We Trust 004 [In Trance We Trust/Black Hole]
- 2001 The Trance Years (Antler-Subway)
- 2002 Recorded 2 [ID&T]
- 2003 Recorded 3 [Universal Music TV]
- 2003 Trance Energy 2003 – The 10th Anniversary Edition [ID&T]
- 2007 In Trance We Trust 12 [In Trance We Trust/Black Hole]
- 2008 Techno Club, Vol. 25 [Klubbstyle Media]
- 2009 Private Party [Black Hole Recordings]
- 2015 Trance Classics, Vol. 1 (Mixed By Johan Gielen) [High Contrast Recordings]
- 2016 Trance Classics, Vol. 2 (Mixed By Johan Gielen) [High Contrast Recordings]
- 2016 Trance Classics, Vol. 3 (Mixed By Johan Gielen) [High Contrast Recordings]

=== Remixes ===
- 1992 Transformer 2 – 'Pacific Symphony 2' (as Supercali) [Profile]
- 1993 Airscape – 'Cruising' (with Chris Inger) [Save the Vinyl]
- 1994 Dirty Harry – 'D'Bop Don't Stop' (as Don Joan) [Scorpio Music]
- 1995 Proyecto Uno – 'El Tiburon' (with Peter Ramson) [Freaky Records]
- 1995 Michèle – 'I Can Feel' (as Don Joan) [BMG]
- 1995 A.D.A.M ft. Amy – 'Memories and Dreams'(with Olliver Adams) [Eternal]
- 1995 A.D.A.M – 'Zombie' (with Olliver Adams) [Eternal]
- 1995 Full Option – 'Rave All Night' (as Don Joan) [PolyGram]
- 1995 U-Matic – 'Cyberspace' (as DJ Don) [Koch International]
- 1996 Pleasure Deluxe – '99 Red Balloons' (with Olliver Adams) [Eternal]
- 1996 Chris Rea – 'Girl In A Sports Car' [EastWest]
- 1996 Body Heat – 'Waves Of Life' (Don Joan's Energy Edit) [Avex Trax]
- 1998 Southside Spinners – 'Luvstruck' [District]
- 1999 The Venga Boys – Kiss [Avex Trax]
- 2000 Svenson & Gielen – 'The Beauty of Silence' [Insolent]
- 2002 Svenson & Gielen – 'Answer the Question' [ID&T]
- 2002 Svenson & Gielen – 'We Know What You Did...' [ID&T]
- 2002 DJ Shog – 'The 2nd Dimension' [Logport Records]
- 2002 Sensation – 'The Anthem 2002' [ID&T]
- 2004 Airscape – 'Sosei' [ID&T]
- 2004 Reeloop – 'Kamistad' [Headline]
- 2004 Dublex Inc. – 'Nifty Night' [Pulver Records]
- 2006 Dave202 – 'Inside Outside' [Muve Recordings]
- 2008 Phunk Investigation – 'Your Love' [Net's Work International]
- 2008 Per Hammar – 'Volta' (as DJ Don) [Playectra]
- 2009 Nils Van Zandt vs. Sergio Silvano ft. Chaquilo MC – 'The Beat Don't Stop' (as DJ Don) [BIP]
- 2009 Airscape ft. JES – 'My Love' [ID&T]
- 2009 Trio Infernal – 'In These Dreams' [Absolutely Records]
- 2009 Phunk Investigation – 'Shuri Shuri' [Avanti]
- 2010 Airscape – 'Cruising 2010' (Johan Gielen & Cor Fijneman Mix) [Black Hole Recordings]
- 2010 Johan Gielen pres. Hollis P. Monroe – 'I'm Lonely' (Johan Gielen & Cor Fijneman Main Mix) [Magik Muzik]
- 2010 Lost Stories presents Prayag & Rishab – 'Ashna' [Songbird]
- 2010 Ad Brown And Matt Lange Feat. Kerry Leva – 'As The Rain Falls' [Songbird]
- 2010 Loverush UK! feat. Shelley Harland – 'Different World 2010' (Johan Gielen & Cor Fijneman Remix) [Sea to Sun/Loverush Digital]
- 2011 Lost Stories – 'The Purple Cow' [Black Hole Recordings]

== See also ==
- "The Beauty of Silence"
