= Sven Maes =

- Also known as: Svenson
- Born: 27 January 1973 (age 52)
- Origin: Sint-Niklaas, Belgium
- Genres: Trance, electronic
- Years active: 1991–present
- Formerly of: Airscape (Svenson & Gielen)
- Website: www.svenson.be

Sven Maes (Dutch pronunciation: [sfɛ ˈmaːs]; born 27 January 1973), also known as Svenson, is a Belgian DJ and trance music producer. His work, especially in partnership with fellow Belgian Johan Gielen, has produced some of trance music's biggest hits. He has been successful as a solo artist and also as a partnership in several collaborative efforts.

== Early years ==
At the age of eighteen, Sven played in an eccentric group of musicians that performed under the name "Mea Culpa". It was during one of their performances at a Belgian contest for rock bands that he was noticed. The yearly event is called Humo's Rock Rally and he was approached by Geert Blanchart, who competed in short track speed skating at the 1994 Winter Olympics. Blanchart, in turn, introduced Sven to a friend of his. That friend was Olivier Adams and was already established in the music industry and was known for their synthesizer work with the acid band Lords of Acid.

It was the interest of Olivier Adams that helped Sven keep moving in a successful direction with his music. The use of Adams' recording studio helped Sven by allowing him to tape several tracks under a few aliases.

== Mainstream success ==
Adams too was the one that introduced Sven to Antler-Subway Records. This is the time that Sven met Johan Gielen. The two paired up to produce tracks such as Bodyheat and Airscape. A significant portion of Sven's composing and production work was done with Johan Gielen. They worked together as Svenson & Gielen for more than a few years. The Airscape remix of Delerium feat. Sarah McLachlan's "Silence" is the duo's biggest hit, as well as their remix of Delerium's "After All", also performed very successfully. It made its way onto several compilations like the Euphoria series of compilations.

It was when their contract with Antler-Subway expired that the rapid successes came one after the other. The duo hooked up with Dutch dance organizer ID&T and started to produce for them. The first track was the epic "The Beauty of Silence". This was soon followed by "Twisted" and "We Know What You Did".

== Discography ==
=== Singles (solo) ===
- 1995 - 'One Way to Live (Is to Party)' (as E-Raver)
- 1996 - 'Do-Re-Mi' (as Joy Toys)
- 1996 - 'Blue World Dream' (as Sea Squad)
- 1996 - 'Nocturna' (as Vince G. Jefferson)
- 1997 - 'Chorus of Whales' (as Voyageur)
- 1997 - 'Let Me Take You on a Trip'
- 1998 - 'Acceleration'
- 1998 - 'Jesus Is Here' (as E-Raver)
- 2000 - 'Break the Silence'
- 2000 - 'Clubbin' on Sunshine'
- 2003 - 'Sunlight Theory'
- 2004 - 'Inside Outside/The Devil's LSD'
- 2005 - 'Wicked Life'
- 2008 - 'Keeping It Real'
- 2008 - 'Lover (I Want You)' [feat. John Robinson]

== See also ==
- Airscape discography
