= Better Off Alone =

1998 single by Alice Deejay

- Orbit Records German cover

Single by Alice Deejay

from the album Who Needs Guitars Anyway?
- Released: December 1998
- Recorded: 1997
- Studio: Violent (Studio 4045) (Hilversum, Netherlands)
- Genre: Eurodance; Techno
- Length: 3:34; 2:56 (UK radio edit/video version)
- Label: Violent
- Songwriters: Sebastiaan Molijn; Eelke Kalberg
- Producers: Wessel van Diepen; Dennis van den Driesschen; Sebastiaan Molijn; Eelke Kalberg

Alice Deejay singles chronology
"Better Off Alone" (1998)	"Back in My Life" (1999)

Audio sample
- 22-second excerpt of the song's primary line.: file; help

Music videos
- "Better Off Alone" on YouTube; "Better Off Alone" (alternative version) on YouTube

DJ Jurgen version
- Violent Records DJ Jurgen single

"Better Off Alone" is a song by Alice Deejay, the Eurodance project of Dutch producer DJ Jurgen in collaboration with Wessel van Diepen, Dennis van den Driesschen, Sebastiaan Molijn and Eelke Kalberg (Pronti & Kalmani). In 1997, the song was released as an instrumental by DJ Jurgen on Violent Records. Later releases of the track included vocals by Judith Pronk, who would later become an important part of the Alice Deejay project. The song was included on the project's debut album, Who Needs Guitars Anyway? (2000). In 2023 and 2025, Billboard magazine featured "Better Off Alone" on their lists of the "Best Pop Songs of All Time" and "Best Dance Songs of All Time".

== Production ==
The song was initially an instrumental track composed in 1997 by Jürgen "DJ Jurgen" Rijkers, Sebastiaan "Pronti" Molijn, and Eelke "Kalmani" Kalberg at the Violent Studios 4045 complex in Hilversum, Netherlands. Violent Music and Violent Studios owners Dennis "Danski" Van Der Driesschen and Wessel "Delmundo" van Diepen had previously offered studio space for Pronti and Kalmani next to their 4045 complex. Before the production of "Better Off Alone", Pronti and Kalmani had worked on composing music for the label's other project the Vengaboys.

In post-production of the instrumental, Sebastiaan Molijn was in an emotionally disconsolate state due to his romantic partner recently leaving him, which is how the line "Do you think you're better off alone?" came to him. Molijn stated that "I started humming the vocal melody while the track was playing and we decided to add vocals. It made the emotion of the song as real as it gets." Judith Pronk later provided the vocals for the Alice Deejay compositions of the song. Pronti and Kalmani's official biography once stated that DJ Jurgen, "wanted to stay the underground DJ that he was, so the group Alice Deejay was formed." In 1999, the "Radio Edit" of the track was produced.

Later in 1999, Sebastiaan Molijn and Eelke Kalberg produced several remixes of the song which included the "Vocal Clubmix", "Pronti & Kalmani Vocal Remix", and the "Pronti & Kalmani Club Dub".

== Composition ==
"Better Off Alone" is written in the key of G# minor. It is set in common time, with a fast tempo of 137 beats per minute. The instruments follow a chord progression of E–D♯m–G♯m–F♯, and the vocals span from B_{3} to G♯_{4}.

With the turn of the century, "Better Off Alone" has been described as a turning point in the development of a commercialized techno sound. This sound is shared by related compositions such as "Blue (Da Ba Dee)" by Eiffel 65 that surfaced around the same time. Co-founder of Dash Berlin Jeffrey Sutorious stated, "It became such a huge chart hit around the world that many people categorised it as Euro Dance, when in fact it started out as vocal trance". Eelke Kalberg and Sebastiaan Molijn are Dash Berlin's other co-founders. Entertainment Weekly described the song as "techno-pop" while Spin described it as a "trance-fueled Eurodance".

== Release ==
=== Single ===
The single was initially released as an instrumental single by DJ Jurgen in 1997 on Violent Music B.V.'s label Violent Records. Upon its release, there were only 500 vinyl records pressed. After the single established credibility under DJ Jurgen's name, the vocal versions got re-released as "DJ Jurgen Presents Alice Deejay" as well as "Alice Deejay Featuring DJ Jurgen" in some countries. The vocal single later came to be of just Alice Deejay.

The track was released to dance clubs and became an international hit in clubs reaching number 2 on the Billboard club charts and a top ten club chart worldwide. The song then became a hit reaching number 2 in Canada, number 27 in the U.S. and number 2 in the UK. It went on to sell over 600,000 copies in the UK and become one of the country's best-selling singles of 1999, despite the radio edit not being on the commercial CD release. The song was in the top 100 best-selling singles in Australia for 2000 as compiled by the Australian Recording Industry Association.

=== Music videos ===
"Better Off Alone" has two versions of its music video. The original music video was directed by Olaf van Gerwen through the studio Blood Simple – who at the time directed videos for Sebastian Molijn and Eelke Kalberg's other music project the Vengaboys. In the first version of the video, a man travels in a Jeep CJ-5 through the Moroccan desert. His car stalls and he is forced to walk on foot. He discards his items along the way such as a watch, a map and some water. In parallel, a woman is sitting on a couch in a living room singing the lyrics to the song while the man sees her in the desert. The man gets lost in the desert while intercut scenes of him and his girlfriend in love are shown. He takes off his broken dog tag while screaming. Because the dog tag is already broken and the girl has the second part probably means he is already dead and she is missing him. The video ends on his dead body being covered by the desert sand.

The second version was directed by "Cousin Mike" from the 1711 Production Group. The second video was shot in Miami for Republic and Universal. The second version is interspersed with desert scenes from the original, but with added scenes where Judith Pronk, Mila Levesque and Angelique Versnel are dancing in a room with Moroccan decor. Sometimes just Pronk alone, wearing a blue dress with a veil.

== Critical reception ==
The song was initially received with passiveness by some critics. J.D. Considine from The Baltimore Sun wrote in his review of Who Needs Guitars Anyway?: "Alice Deejay's sound is synth-driven and slightly retro, owing more to the frothy fun of '80s electropop than to the relentless thump of modern techno, and the songwriting is tuneful and hook-driven, lending an engaging, Ace of Base charm to the likes of "Better Off Alone"." Entertainment Weekly gave the song a B rating, describing it as having "catchy, throwaway results" with "barely there lyrics". Scottish Daily Record complimented its "great vocal and a pounding techno beat".

In retrospect the song garnered acclaim. Vibe magazine considered the song "a timeless track" in their "30 Dance Tracks from the '90s That Changed the Game". Complex magazine stated the song, "perfectly embodies the 1990s Eurodance/euro trance sound that took over clubs, and today we're hearing the big room house scene build upon what was started here" in their "10 Essential Eurodance Classics". Complex also stated that Sebastiaan Molijn and Eelke Kalberg's production of trance music project Dash Berlin, is directly reflective of the song's influence on the modern day electronic music scene. In 2017, BuzzFeed listed the song at number 24 in their list of "The 101 Greatest Dance Songs of the '90s". Dash Berlin honorarily included the song in their top 5 greatest trance classics. Critic George McCarthy has described the song as being 'full of life: displaying an extensive range of raw emotional vulnerabilities that are unmatched by any other modern dance track, is a banger'.

Meagan Garvey of MTV referenced the song as an example of "Eurodance Nostalgia" and that the cult status of the song is "mostly retroactive". Garvey stated that songs such as "Better Off Alone", "left you with an aching sensation, as if something had been left unsaid. The undercurrent of melancholy seemed more akin to mid-'90s tracks like La Bouche's "Where Do You Go" or Haddaway's "What Is Love," dance tracks built around unanswerable questions." In March 2025, Billboard magazine ranked "Better Off Alone" number 48 in their list of "The 100 Best Dance Songs of All Time".

== Track listings ==
- Dutch, Canadian, Australian, and New Zealand maxi-CD single
1. "Better Off Alone" (radio edit) – 3:36 (3:38)
2. "Better Off Alone" (vocal club mix) – 6:36 (6:53)
3. "Better Off Alone" (Signum remix) – 7:46 (7:49)
4. "Better Off Alone" (Pronti & Kalmani vocal remix) – 7:04 (7:07)
5. "Better Off Alone" (Pronti & Kalmani club dub) – 6:46 (6:52)
6. "Better Off Alone" (Mark van Dale with Enrico remix) – 9:27 (9:28)

Note: Canadian durations are noted in parentheses

- European maxi-CD single
1. "Better Off Alone" (radio edit) – 3:36
2. "Better Off Alone" (vocal club mix) – 6:51
3. "Better Off Alone" (Signum remix) – 7:46
4. "Better Off Alone" (instrumental mix) – 6:36
5. "Better Off Alone" (Pronti & Kalmani vocal remix) – 7:04
6. "Better Off Alone" (club dub) – 6:46
- Scandinavian CD single
1. "Better Off Alone" (radio edit) – 3:36
2. "Better Off Alone" (vocal club mix) – 6:36
- UK CD and 12-inch single
1. "Better Off Alone" (vocal club mix) – 6:36
2. "Better Off Alone" (Signum remix) – 6:21
3. "Better Off Alone" (DJ Jam X and De Leon's Dumonde remix) – 6:42
- UK cassette single
1. "Better Off Alone" (UK short cut) – 2:53
2. "Better Off Alone" (vocal club mix) – 6:36
3. "Better Off Alone" (Pronti & Kalmani vocal remix) – 7:04
- US 12-inch single

A1. "Better Off Alone" (vocal club mix) – 6:36
A2. "Better Off Alone" (Jam & Dumonde remix) – 6:42
B1. "Better Off Alone" (Mark van Dale with Enrico remix) – 9:27
B2. "Better Off Alone" (original edit) – 3:32

- Canadian 12-inch single

A1. "Better Off Alone" (vocal club mix) – 6:53
A2. "Better Off Alone" (Signum remix) – 7:49
B1. "Better Off Alone" (Pronti & Kalmani vocal remix) – 7:07
B2. "Better Off Alone" (Mark van Dale with Enrico remix) – 9:28

== Charts ==
=== Weekly charts ===
Weekly chart performance for "Better Off Alone"
Chart (1999–2000)	Peak position
Australia (ARIA)	4
Belgium (Ultratop 50 Flanders)	14
Belgium (Ultratop 50 Wallonia)	30
Canada (Nielsen SoundScan)	2
Canada Top Singles (RPM)	19
Canada Dance/Urban (RPM)	1
Denmark (IFPI)	11
Europe (Eurochart Hot 100)	12
Finland (Suomen virallinen lista)	16
France (SNEP)	6
Germany (GfK)	32
Hungary (Mahasz)	10
Iceland (Íslenski Listinn Topp 40)	25
Ireland (IRMA)	3
Italy (FIMI)	17
Netherlands (Dutch Top 40)	9
Netherlands (Single Top 100)	8
New Zealand (Recorded Music NZ)	11
Norway (VG-lista)	3
Scottish Singles Sales (Official Charts)	1
Sweden (Sverigetopplistan)	5
Switzerland (Schweizer Hitparade)	28
UK Singles (Official Charts)	2
UK Dance (Official Charts)	1
US Billboard Hot 100	27
US Dance Club Songs (Billboard)	3
US Dance Singles Sales (Billboard)	16
US Pop Airplay (Billboard)	20
US Rhythmic Airplay (Billboard)	14

=== Year-end charts ===
1999 year-end chart performance for "Better Off Alone"
Chart (1999)	Position
Belgium (Ultratop 50 Flanders)	75
Europe (Eurochart Hot 100)	40
France (SNEP)	51
Netherlands (Dutch Top 40)	24
Netherlands (Single Top 100)	36
Romania (Romanian Top 100)	84
Sweden (Hitlistan)	44
UK Singles (OCC)	12
UK Airplay (Music Week)	33
UK Pop (Music Week)	2

2000 year-end chart performance for "Better Off Alone"
Chart (2000)	Position
Australia (ARIA)	88
US Billboard Hot 100	88
US Mainstream Top 40 (Billboard)	61
US Rhythmic Top 40 (Billboard)	35

2001 year-end chart performance for "Better Off Alone"
Chart (2001)	Position
Canada (Nielsen SoundScan)	143

== Certifications ==
Certifications and sales for "Better Off Alone"
Region	Certification	Certified units/sales
Australia (ARIA)	Gold	35,000^{^}
Denmark (IFPI Danmark)	Gold	45,000^{‡}
France (SNEP)	Gold	250,000^{*}
Germany (BVMI)	Gold	300,000^{‡}
Italy (FIMI)	Gold	50,000^{‡}
New Zealand (RMNZ)	2× Platinum	60,000^{‡}
Spain (Promusicae)	Platinum	60,000^{‡}
Sweden (GLF)	Gold	15,000^{^}
United Kingdom (BPI)	2× Platinum	1,200,000^{‡}
^{*} Sales figures based on certification alone.^{^} Shipments figures based on certification alone.^{‡} Sales+streaming figures based on certification alone.

== Release history ==
Release dates anf formats for "Better Off Alone"
Region	Date	Format(s)	Label(s)	Ref(s).
Netherlands	December 1998	12-inch vinyl; CD	Violent	
Europe	4 June 1999	CD	Orbit; Virgin	
United Kingdom	19 July 1999	12-inch vinyl; CD; cassette	Positiva; Violent	
United States	29 February 2000	Rhythmic contemporary; contemporary hit radio	Republic; Universal	

== Cover versions and samples ==
- In 2008, the main melody of the song was sampled by producer Johnny Juliano in "Say Yeah" by Wiz Khalifa, which added the Roland TR-808 as well as drum machine claps to the existing melody. Hip hop and trap producer AraabMuzik stated that sampling the song was initially what led him to sampling "trance and really upbeat dance music". The song was sampled by him in "South Beach" by 40 Cal. featuring Duke Da God.
- In 2011, witch house group Salem covered the song on their EP I'm Still in the Night.
- In 2013, the main melody of the song was sampled in David Guetta's 2013 song "Play Hard" featuring Ne-Yo and Akon.
- Lindsay Lohan's 2019 track "Xanax" is built around a slowed-down sample of the song.
- Canadian pop band Purity Ring also released a cover of the song on 29 September 2020.
- The main beat of Save Me, made in February 2020 by Bruno Martini, Avian Grays and TRIXL, Feat. Mayra, is also taken from this song.
- Dutch DJ San Holo recorded a guitar version of the song, and published it on his Twitter feed on 2 August 2021.
- In 2022, Darwin Núñez joined Liverpool F.C. from S.L. Benfica. Soon after his signing, a chant about him set to the tune of "Better Off Alone" was popularised on social media.
- In 2023, Kim Petras and Nicki Minaj released "Alone", featuring a sample of the song.
- In 2023, Sam Feldt and Jonas Blue released "Crying on the Dancefloor", featuring a sample of the song.
- In 2023, Alan Walker, Dash Berlin and Vikkstar released "Better Off (Alone, Pt. III)", featuring a sample of the song.
- In 2024, Midwife, project of American shoegaze artist Madeline Johnston, covered the song for the album No Depression in Heaven.
