= 3 Steps Ahead =

Dutch gabber music producer

- Born: Peter-Paul Pigmans; 31 January 1961; Rotterdam, Netherlands
- Died: 27 August 2003 (aged 42) Netherlands
- Genres: Gabber
- Years active: 1994 - 2003

Peter-Paul Pigmans (31 January 1961 – 27 August 2003) was a Dutch gabber music producer, best known for his production under the pseudonym 3 Steps Ahead.

Born in Berkel en Rodenrijs and based out of Rotterdam, Pigmans' music is widely considered one of the most innovative specimens of the gabber genre; while many gabber producers favor raw force and little virtuosity when creating a song, Pigmans' music always had a strong technical side, and his songs often featured atmospherical elements, an unusual thing in the genre at the time. He was also known for his extremely wild live shows.

His first full-length album Most Wanted & Mad (1997) reached #35 on the Dutch Album Top 100.

Pigmans was known for his eccentric live performances, with bizarre suits, strange sound effects and rousing live sets. For instance, he wore a football shirt that was half a Feyenoord shirt and half an Ajax shirt, aiming to promote fraternisation within the hardcore scene.

Pigmans was diagnosed with brain cancer in 1999. On 18 July 2003 in Zaandam at the Hemkade Stadium, fellow Dutch producers organized a fundraising event for him called "3 Steps Ahead 4 Life" where the cream of the Dutch gabber scene performed (for free - all income was spent on his treatment in hope of curing him) and paid respect to him. A couple of weeks later, he died. Two months later the annual Thunderdome started with a one-minute silence in his memory.

He's been elected into the Thunderdome Hall of Fame.

== Discography ==
=== Albums ===
- Most Wanted & Mad (1997)
- Junkie (2000)

=== EPs ===
- Step 1 (1994)
- Step 2 (1994)
- Step 3 (1994)
- Drop It (1996)
- Hakkûh (1996)
- Gangster (1996)
- It's Delicious (1997)
- Paint It Black (1998)

== Singles ==
- In the Name of Love (2010)

== Film soundtracks ==
Two of his songs were used in the soundtrack for Brüno (2009): "Thunderdome Till We Die" and "Stravinsky's Bass".
