= Airscape =

Belgian trance act

- Also known as: Svenson & Gielen; Body Heat
- Origin: Belgium
- Genre: Trance
- Years active: 1994–2005; 2009–present
- Members: Johan Gielen
- Past members: Jos Borremans; Sven Maes

External videos
- Airscape - L'Esperanza (Official Music Video)

Airscape is a Belgian trance act composed of Johan Gielen. Formerly including Sven Maes, the group also recorded as Svenson & Gielen (Dutch pronunciation: [ˈsfɛnsɔn ɛŋ ˈɣilə(n)]) and several other pseudonyms. The original two-man group dissolved in 2005, each going solo. In 2009, Airscape was revived as a solo project by Johan Gielen.

== History ==
The name Airscape was first used by Johan Gielen for work with other producers, mostly Jos Borremans. Gielen and Sven Maes started producing together in 1994 under the alias Body Heat. It wouldn't be until 1997 that they would resurrect the Airscape name, and until 2000 that they would become known as Svenson & Gielen.

They are known for their songs like "L'Esperanza" (1999) and "The Beauty of Silence" (2000), but are also known for their remixes of singles such as Tiësto's "Sparkles", Vengaboys' "Kiss (When the Sun Don't Shine)", Chicane's "Halcyon" and Delerium's "Silence", the latter of which was used as the lead single release and in the music video of the song when it was re-issued in 2000, reaching the top 3 of the UK Singles Chart. Their remixes have a distinctive and easily recognized style; they fade in and out looped vocals, overlay simple chord patterns on a fuzzy-sounding synthesizer, and almost always cut the bass and drums about halfway through the song to bring an ostinato to the foreground before returning to the main theme. Similar elements can be found to a lesser degree in their original music as well.

In 2005, the Airscape project took a firm break when Sven Maes left the project, but in 2009 Johan Gielen resurrected Airscape as a solo project and injected it with a new release, "My Love" featuring Jes.

== Discography ==
=== Airscape ===
- 1993 Cruising
- 1993 Jafar Wizard
- 1994 Party Supply
- 1994 The Seventh Key
- 1995 Plaisir D'Eté
- 1997 "Pacific Melody", with Peter Ramson - UK #27
- 1998 "Amazon Chant", with Peter Ramson - UK #46
- 1999 "L'Esperanza" - UK #33
- 2004 "Sosei"
- 2009 "My Love", with JES
- 2009 "L'Esperanza 2009"
- 2010 Now & Then
- 2010 "My Love", with JES
- 2013 "Endless Forever"
- 2013 "Welcome Home"
- 2013 "Promise", with Radboud
- 2014 "All Of Us", with Peetu S
- 2014 "Manami's Theme" E
- 2015 "Beautiful Tomorrow"
- 2015 "Pianomatic", with Peetu S

=== Svenson & Gielen ===
- 2000 "The Beauty of Silence", with Christel Ferket
- 2001 "Twisted", with Paul Mendez
- 2002 "Answer the Question"
- 2002 "We Know What You Did..."
- 2003 "Beachbreeze (Remember the Summer)", with Jan Johnston

=== DJ Don & Svenson ===
- 1997 "My Beat Shoot Back"
- 1997 "Back Once Again"
- 1998 "My Beat Shoot Back '98"
- 1999 "Acceleration"
- 2002 "My Beat Shoot Back 2002"

=== Body Heat/T-Phobia ===
- 1994 "Waves of Life"
- 1996 "Gonna Make U Feel"
- 1997 "T-Fobia", with Petra Spiegl and Peter Ramson (¹)
- 2001 "The Future of House 2001"

(¹) This track was also released with the artist and track names reversed

=== Bocaccio Life ===
- 1997 "The Secret Wish"
- 1998 "Time (There's No Way)"
- 1998 "Angels", with Petra Spiegl

=== Other aliases ===
- 1998 "Guilty?", as Leader of the Nation
- 1998 "The Night Jam", as Buzzerr
- 1998 "Open Your Heart", as Ramses, with Carl Johansen and Ivo Donckers
- 1999 "Moments in Love", as Allegro
- 1999 "Mystic Paradise", as Nightwatchers
- 1999 "Planet Rio", as Summer Madness, with DJ Jean
- 1999 "Summer Power", as Summer Madness, with DJ Jean
- 1999 "In Love with an Angel", as Sweet Deception
- 1999 "Fresh (All Night Long)", as Straweberry Flavour
- 1999 "Destination Sunshine", as Balearic Bill, with Alex Gold
- 2000 "The Beginning", as Bombario, with Rutger Steenbergen
- 2000 "Living on my Own", as Mr. Vinx, with DJ Serge and Remy Martinez
- 2001 "Lost in a Dream", as Matanka, with Michael Parsberg

=== Production for other artists ===
- 1997 Shaydie - "Always Forever"
- 1998 Lava Rouge - "Do You Want Me"
- 1998 Da Phat Smokers - "The Light"
- 1999 Des Mitchell - "(Welcome) To The Dance"
- 2000 Alice Deejay - "The Lonely One"
- 2002 Ayumi Hamasaki - "Depend on You" (Svenson & Gielen remix)
- 2004 Cyber X feat. Jody Watley - "Waves of Love"

=== Remixes ===
As Airscape

- 1997 Zohra - "I Hate 2 Love You"
- 1998 Jesus Loves You - "Generations of Love"
- 1999 Absolom - "Where?"
- 1999 Tiësto - "Sparkles"
- 1999 Praga Khan - "Breakfast in Vegas"
- 1999 Sweet Deception - "In Love with an Angel"
- 1999 Delerium feat. Sarah McLachlan - "Silence"
- 1999 Singles & Angles - "Submerge"
- 1999 Des Mitchell - "Welcome to the Dance"
- 1999 Vengaboys - Kiss (When the Sun Don't Shine)
- 2000 Manya - "Bound"
- 2000 Beam & Yanou - "Sound of Love" (Airscape vs. Des Mitchell)
- 2000 Chicane - "Halcyon"
- 2000 Sagitaire - "Shout (C'Mon)"
- 2000 Kosmonova- "Danse Avec Moi!"
- 2000 Bombario - “The Beginning”
- 2000 Dario G - "Dream to Me"
- 2000 RMB - "Deep Down Below"
- 2000 Tomski - "Love Will Come"
- 2000 Scooter - "I'm Your Pusher"
- 2000 Alice Deejay - "The Lonely One"
- 2000 Mythos 'N DJ Cosmo - Hymn
- 2000 Gotham - "Elephant Fish"
- 2000 Delerium - "Silence"
- 2000 Sylver - "Turn the Tide"
- 2001 Safri Duo - "Played-a-Live"
- 2001 Mr. Vinx - "Livin' on My Own"
- 2001 Wendy Phillips - "Stay"
- 2001 Vanessa-Mae - "White Bird"
- 2001 Tekara - "Breathe in You"

As Svenson & Gielen

- 1997 Cubic 22 - "Party People"
- 2000 Factor 9 - "Release Me"
- 2000 Push - "The Legacy"
- 2001 Ayumi Hamasaki - "Depend on You"
- 2001 Moogue - "China Girl"
- 2001 Ultra - "Free"
- 2001 Tiesto - "Lethal Industry"
- 2002 Brooklyn Bounce - "Bring It Back"
- 2002 Minimalistix - "Close Cover"
- 2002 Blank & Jones - "Watching the Waves"
- 2002 ATB - "Hold You"
- 2002 The Thrillseekers - "Dreaming of You"
- 2002 Every Little Thing - "Dear Friend"
- 2002 Don Diablo - "Acceleration"
- 2002 Lexicon 4 - "Reach Me"
- 2002 Divine Inspiration - "The Way"
- 2003 Delerium feat. Jael - "After All"
- 2003 Divine Inspiration - "The Way (Put Your Hand on Me)
- 2003 Spacediver - "Unspoken"
- 2004 Cyber X - "Waves of Love"

As DJ Don & Svenson

- 1997 Laguna - "Spiller from Rio"
- 1998 MaUVe - "93"
- 1998 Boccaccio Life - "Angels"
- 1998 Babe Instinct - "Disco Babes from Outer Space"
- 1998 Leader Of The Nation - "Guilty?"
- 1998 Praga Khan - "Injected with a Poison"
- 1998 Ramses II - "Open Your Heart"
- 1998 Mad Diva - "Spotlight"
- 1998 Da Phat Smokers - "The Light"
- 1999 The Footclub - "Driftwood "
- 1999 Dixie's Gang - "Party Time"
- 1999 La Luna - "Venus"

Other Aliases

- 1997 Shaydie - "Always Forever" (as Body Heat)
- 2009 Airscape - "L'Esperanza 2009" (as S&G)
