= Hakkûhbar =

Dutch parody group

- Origin: Netherlands
- Genres: gabber, happy hardcore, parody music
- Years active: 1996–1997
- Labels: Roadrunner Records, Mokum Records
- Past members: Bob Fosko; Bart Vleming; Ad de Feyter; Ewart van der Horst; Ruben van der Meer

Hakkûhbar is a Dutch parody group formed in 1996 by Bob Fosko. It is a parody of gabber culture, which was popular among Dutch youth in the 1990s. The group achieved several successes, including Gabbertje, which was certified platinum.

== Biography ==
The group Hakkûhbar was founded by Bob Fosko, a member of De Raggende Manne, along with Bart Vleming, Ad de Feyter, and Ewart van der Horst. In their music videos and concerts, they were accompanied by actor Ruben van der Meer, who portrayed a young "gabber" in exaggerated parody form. Fosko and van der Meer met on the set of VPRO, participating in sketches for the children's show Erwassus, including De nieuwe Aussie van de Gabber (literally "the new Australian of the gabber," a parody of the story The Emperor's New Clothes, known in Dutch as Die nieuwe klere van de keizer).

The group disbanded in 1997. A reunion would be "super" according to Bob Fosko, who was interviewed in April 2014. However, it is highly unlikely due to irreconcilable conflicts between some members over financial disputes that arose at the time of their dissolution.

== Compositions ==
The vocals for the group's various songs are performed by Bob Fosco, notably in Gabbertje, however actor Ruben van der Meer sings one of the group's songs, Gabberlove. The song Gabbertje, a parody of the theme tune of the 1970s Dutch series Swiebertje, was released in 1996. The music video accompanying the single's release was directed by Benjamin Landshoff, a friend of Fosco and director of Erwassus. Gabbertje reached number one in the Dutch charts, including the Dutch Top 40, and achieved both gold and platinum certification. A German version of the song, titled Ratzekahl (roughly "totally bald"), was also recorded, this time featuring Neel van der Elst.

Following this success, Hakkûhbar released more songs such as Supergabber, Gabbersaurus, and the double single Feestbeest/Gabberlove. The music videos for these songs were directed by Martin Koolhoven, another acquaintance of Bob Fosko. These singles and some other tracks were compiled into an album titled Vet heftig, released in 1997. To coincide with the album release, Hakkûhbar produced a short film, Vet Heftig – de video, chronicling the rise and fall of the group. The film was produced by Martin Koolhoven, with leading roles played by Van der Meer and Fosko, alongside Marco Borsato, Tatum Dagelet, Tjeerd Oosterhuis, Nance Coolen, Bart Vleming, Harry de Groot, Anita Doth from the Dutch group 2 Unlimited, and Alfred Lagarde. The film has been broadcast multiple times on TMF Nederland under the title Vet heftig – de film.

A DVD was released in 2004, featuring the short film, the album Vet heftig and all of the music videos.

== Discography ==
=== Studio album ===
Album	Year	Chart	Highest position	Weeks in the chart
Vet heftig	1997	Dutch Albums (Album Top 100)	62	5

=== Singles ===
Single	Year	Chart	Highest position	Weeks in the chart
Gabbertje	1996	Netherlands (Dutch Top 40)	1	11
Supergabber	1997	Netherlands (Dutch Top 40)	3	9
Gabbersaurus	1997	Netherlands (Dutch Top 40)	14	4
Feestbeest / Gabberlove	1997	Netherlands (Dutch Top 40)	7	5
