= ID&T =

Dutch entertainment events company

- Type: Private
- Industry: Concert tours, event production
- Founders: Irfan Van Ewijk; Duncan Stutterheim; Theo Van Lelie
- Owner: Superstruct Entertainment
- Website: The official ID&T website

ID&T is a Dutch entertainment and medium enterprise that was founded in the early 1990s. Their event Thunderdome is named the oldest electronic festival in the Netherlands, with later events like Mysteryland, Trance Energy and Sensation. It operates many of the largest electronic dance music events in the world. It was also involved in the editions of Tomorrowland up until 2013.

== History ==
=== Early years and growth ===
The ID&T wizard, the old logo taken from a character produced by street artist Mode 2

ID&T stands for the initials of three founders of the company, Irfan van Ewijk, Duncan Stutterheim and Theo Lelie, all residents of Amsterdam. All three were experienced in organizing house, techno and trance parties when they created ID&T, and their goal is to organize the largest events in the Netherlands and the European electronic dance music scene. Their first big event was "The Final Exam" in the Utrecht Conference Center, with about 12,000 people in attendance.

Today, ID&T is one of the largest dance organizers in the Netherlands. Events organised by the company include Sensation in the Amsterdam Arena, with around 40,000 people. There are two editions, Sensation (formerly known as Sensation White) (house), happening in the first Saturday of July, where all attendees come dressed in white, and BLACK (formerly known as Sensation Black) (techno, hardstyle, and hardcore), happening in the Saturday thereafter, where all attendees wear in black.

Other parties include Mysteryland on the Floriade 2002 terrain near Hoofddorp, with around 50,000 people, Innercity in the Amsterdam RAI Exhibition and Convention Centre (45,000 people) with eight areas and several styles, happening in the middle of December, Thunderdome (hardcore techno and techno), Trance Energy, Bloomingdale and NJOY. Such parties last all night, from 11pm to 7am (except open-air ones), including laser shows and fireworks. ID&T also operated the ID&T Release magazine and the music download portal ID&T Dance Tunes.com. Since 2014 the music download portal went offline without prior notice. Currently only Dance-Tunes Radio is active, an online streaming service hosted from Belgium. They organized the first event where a single DJ played all night long, with Tiësto in Gelredome on 11 May 2003. These events were organized again in the same venue on two subsequent nights on 29 and 30 October 2004 and again on 2 June 2007. The same happened at Ethias Arena in Hasselt (Belgium) on 6 Nov 2004 and 19 May 2007. The concerts in 2007 are named 'Elements of Life'.

They also collaborated with Q-Dance in the organization of "The One Man Show" concert of DJ Luna at the Gelredome in Arnhem in 2005.

On July 16, 2005, the first Sensation White was organized in Germany, at Arena AufSchalke in Gelsenkirchen. Together with the musical and theatre company Stage Entertainment (formerly Stage Holding) they created ID&T Germany as a joint venture. On April 16, 2005, the same event took place in Belgium. In 2009, it was organized for the first time on two subsequent nights on 3 and 4 July in the Amsterdam Arena where the opening of the Wicked Wonderland took place.

=== SFX/LiveStyle ===
In 2013, the American conglomerate SFX Entertainment acquired a 75% majority stake in ID&T. In December 2014, it was announced that ID&T would be a "creative partner" for Electric Zoo 2015 in New York City, which is also owned by SFX.

In 2016, SFX filed for Chapter 11 bankruptcy protection; the transition was not expected to impact ID&T's events, besides the U.S. TomorrowWorld event (whose fate had been in question following infrastructural issues that marred the 2015 edition). The company later emerged under new leadership as LiveStyle.

=== Superstruct ===
In 2021, LiveStyle sold ID&T to the British company Superstruct Entertainment, a company led by Cream co-founder James Barton that also owns Øyafestivalen and Sónar.

In 2024, Superstruct was in turn acquired by U.S. private equity firm Kohlberg Kravis Roberts for US$1.4 billion.

== List of ID&T events ==
Name	Year	Location	Notes	Max attendance	Picture
Thunderdome	1992–present	Netherlands	Operated by ID&T, more than 10,000 people in attendance on 20 June 1992. From 1992 to 2012 it operated Thunderdome as a festival.	50,000 (2022)	
Mysteryland	1993–present	Netherlands, Bethel, NY, Chile	An annual festival billed as the oldest dance music festival in the Netherlands.	100,000+ (2017)	
Trance Energy	1999–2010	Netherlands	Founded by ID&T as a large trance event. It was being held up until 2010, after which the name changed to "Energy". There have been no Energy parties since 2013.	30,000 (max capacity)	
Innercity	1999-2006	Netherlands, Amsterdam	Yearly dance event in Amsterdam RAI. There were also international editions in Belgium, Moscow, Brasil, Vegas, Germany and Israel	20,000	
Sensation	2000–2017 2020—Present	Amsterdam Arena, International	The Dutch indoor dance-event has been divided into two versions. Sensation Black concentrated more on darker music, such as Hardstyle and Hardcore, while Sensation White is typically a house and trance event. Attendees were required to wear all black or white, depending on the event. Ever since 2009 Black was no longer held in the Arena, while White continues to this day.	45,000 (2002+)	
Tomorrowland	2005–2013	Boom, Belgium	The largest electronic music festival held in the world, with over 600 000 attending in 2022. ID&T was involved up until 2013	600 000+ (2022)	
TomorrowWorld	2013–2015	Georgia, United States	Organized by ID&T Belgium, spinoff of Tomorrowland. In its inaugural year, TomorrowWorld received a nomination for Best Music Event at the International Dance Music Awards.	160,000 (2014)	
Amsterdam Music Festival	2014–present	Amsterdam	Large event organized by ALDA Events and ID&T.		
Electric Zoo Festival	2009–present	New York City	An annual electronic music festival held over Labor Day weekend in New York City on Randall's Island. Founded in 2009, IDandT became a creative element in 2014.	110,000 (2011 over 3 days)	

== Awards and nominations ==
=== International Dance Music Awards ===
Year	Category	Work	Result	Ref.
2009 (Note: Category debut)	Best Event Promoter	ID&T	Won	
2010	Best Event Promoter	ID&T	Won	
2011	Best Event Promoter	ID&T	Won	
2012	Best Event Promoter	ID&T	Nominated	
2013 (Note: Categories final year)	Best Event Promoter	ID&T	Nominated	

== See also ==
- List of electronic music festivals
