= Driftwood (disambiguation) =

Driftwood is wood that has been deposited on land by the action of waves.

Driftwood may also refer to:

== Places ==
=== Canada ===
- Driftwood Range, a mountain range in British Columbia

==== Ontario ====
- Driftwood, Ontario, an unincorporated community in the Cochrane District
- Driftwood Avenue, a road in Toronto
- Driftwood Provincial Park, a provincial park near Deep River, Ontario
- Driftwood stop, an under-construction Toronto subway stop

=== United States ===
- Drift Falls, also known as Driftwood Falls, Pisgah National Forest, North Carolina
- Driftwood, Oklahoma
- Driftwood, Pennsylvania, a borough
- Driftwood, Texas, an unincorporated community
- Driftwood, Washington, an unincorporated community
- Driftwood Creek, a river in Alaska
- Driftwood River, Indiana
- Driftwood Township, Jackson County, Indiana

== In films ==
- Driftwood (1928 film), directed by Christy Cabanne
- Driftwood (1947 film), directed by Allan Dwan; starring Natalie Wood
- Driftwood (2006 film), directed by Tim Sullivan
- Driftwood (2016 film), directed by Paul Taylor
- Otis B. Driftwood, Groucho Marx's character in the film A Night at the Opera

== In music ==
=== Songs ===
- "Driftwood", a song by the band A-ha; the B-side to the song "The Sun Always Shines on T.V."
- "Driftwood", a song composed by Jean Sibelius (op. 17/7) over an untitled poem by Ilmari Kianto
- "Driftwood", a song from the 2010 album Ø (Disambiguation) by the band Underoath
- "Driftwood", a song from the 2014 EP Nothing for Us Here by the band Cult Leader
- "Driftwood", a song from the 2025 album The Ossuary Lens by the band Allegaeon
- "Driftwood" (The Moody Blues song), 1978
- "Driftwood" (Travis song), 1999

=== Other ===
- Driftwood (band), an Americana band from Binghamton, New York
- Driftwood, the project name used by the group Shocksteady to release the trance single "Freeloader"
- Driftwood (album), a 2001 album by Eddi Reader
- Driftwood, a 2014 album by Wolfgang Muthspiel
- Jimmy Driftwood (1897–1998), American folksinger and songwriter

== Other uses ==
- Driftwood (horse) (1932–1960), an American Quarter Horse Hall of Fame inductee
- Driftwood Inn and Restaurant, a historic site in Vero Beach, Florida
- Operation Driftwood, a British Second World War commando raid
- Driftwood (novel), a 2014 novel by Elizabeth Dutton

== See also ==
- Driftwood catfish
