= Adaro (DJ) =

Dutch DJ

Thijs Ploegmakers
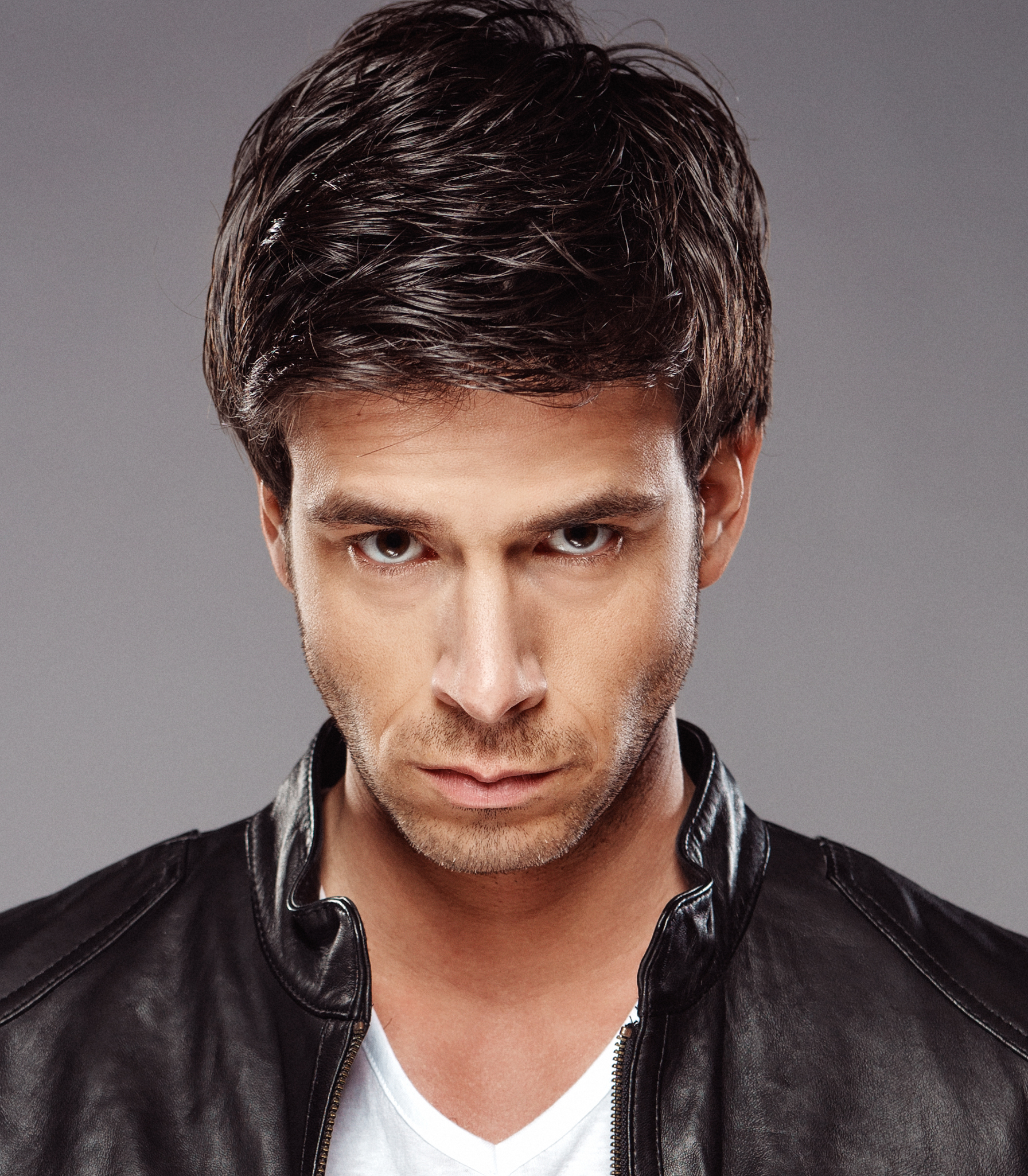
- Adaro in 2014

Background information
- Also known as: Adaro
- Born: Schaijk
- Origin: Netherlands
- Genres: Hardstyle
- Years active: 2002-present
- Labels: Roughstate, A2 Records
- Member of: Shocksteady, Gunz For Hire
- Formerly of: Driftwood
- Website: http://www.djadaro.com/

Thijs Ploegmakers, known musically as Adaro, is a Dutch DJ and producer. He has produced music in several dance styles, and in 2008 started producing raw hardstyle, for which he is considered to be one of the originators of.

== Career ==
Ploegmakers' breakthrough tracks as Adaro were “The Haunter of the Dark" and “No Time To Sleep”, along with a remix of “Answers” by Chain Reaction. In 2013 he was voted number 75 in the DJ Mag Top 100. Adaro released his music on A2 Records until 2014. In March, 2015, alongside Ran-D, B-Front and Frequencerz, Adaro became a founding member of the hardstyle record label "Roughstate".

Ploegmakers has released multiple songs that have reached marked commercial success within the hardstyle field, including "Touch A Star" with B-Front feat. Dawnfire, which was awarded #4 in the Q-dance Top 100 countdown for 2018. More hits include “I’m Alive” (official Rebirth Festival Anthem), “Strong” with Rejecta, his official Intents Festival anthem "Circus Of Insanity" with Digital Punk, his official remix for "Rellen in de Hel" by Dutch Hip-Hop artist EZG, “Walk with Me” with Vertile, his solo track “Flame up High”, and a remix of “Calling” by Sefa.

== Collaborations ==
In addition to his solo releases, Ploegmakers has collaborated with many artists within the hardstyle genre such as B-Front, Rejecta, Vertile, Hard Driver, Endymion, Digital Punk, Kronos, E-Force, MYST and Crypsis.

In 2002, Ploegmakers was part of the electronic music group Driftwood with fellow producers Ron van Kroonenburg and Dirk Jans, best known for their worldwide radio hit “Freeloader”. Ploegmakers and Jans then regrouped as the duo Shocksteady, producing trance music.

Ploegmakers is currently a half of the hardstyle act Gunz For Hire together with Ran-D, which was created in 2011. Gunz For Hire have released a discography of well-known hardstyle hits, including "Bella Ciao," “Seek & Destroy”, "Bolivia," "Plata O Plomo," "No Mercy," “Kings of the Underground,” and “Sorrow”.

Ploegmakers has performed as Adaro at some of the largest EDM and hardstyle events, such as Decibel Outdoor Festival, Defqon.1 Festival (Netherlands & Australia), Qlimax, Mysteryland, Q-BASE, Tomorrowland, Qapital, Reverze and EDC Las Vegas. Aside from being recognised as a leading DJ and producer in his home country, The Netherlands, Adaro is globally popular in the hardstyle scenes of countries including The United States, Mexico, Chile, Australia, China, Czech Republic, Switzerland, Sweden, Norway, Scotland, Italy, France, Spain, Portugal, Bulgaria, Canada, Austria, Germany and Belgium.

== Discography ==
Trackname	Alias	Label	Year
My Name Is Hardstyle	Ran-D vs Adaro	A2 Records	2008
Under Attack / Struggle For Existence	Ran-D & Adaro	A2 Records	2010
Hit You With That Bang Shit	Adaro	A2 Records	2011
Gangsters Don't Dance	Gunz For Hire	A2 Records	2011
The Haunter of the Dark	Adaro	A2 Records	2011
Put It On / Evolution Complete	Gunz For Hire	A2 Records	2011
The Italian Tribute	Adaro	Titanic Records	2012
Air (Dance Air Anthem 2012)	The R3belz & Adaro	Scantraxx Special	2012
No Time To Sleep	Adaro	A2 Records	2012
Kings of the Underground	Gunz For Hire	A2 Records	2012
Bolivia	Gunz For Hire	A2 Records	2012
Everyday	Digital Punk & Adaro	Free Release	2012
Another Sh*t Track	Crypsis & Adaro	Minus Is More (Cryptology)	2012
Natural Born Killers	Adaro & Digital Punk	A2 Records	2013
Worth Fighting For (Qapital 2013 Anthem)	B-Front & Adaro	Q-Dance	2013
Sorrow	Gunz For Hire	A2 Records	2013
Answers (Adaro remix)	Chain Reaction	Minus is More	2013
History	Adaro	A2 Records	2013
For The Street	Adaro	A2 Records	2013
Immortal (Qlimax 2013 Anthem)	Gunz For Hire	Q-Dance	2013
I'm The King	Adaro & The Prophet	Scantraxx Recordz	2014
Swagger	Gunz For Hire	A2 Records	2014
My Soul To Take	Adaro	Roughstate	2015
Raggamuffin	Adaro	Roughstate	2015
Open The Gates	Adaro & E-Force	Roughstate	2015
For The Street (Regain Remix)	Adaro ft. Danny Scandal	A2 Records	2015
Dark Universe	Adaro ft. Rob Gee	Roughstate	2015
This Is Los Angeles	Gunz For Hire	Roughstate	2015
Oldschool Flow	Adaro & E-Force	Roughstate	2015
Whiplashed	Digital Punk & Adaro	A2 Records	2015
Plata O Plomo	Gunz For Hire	Roughstate	2016
I'm A Criminal	Gunz For Hire	Roughstate	2016
Ik Wil Gewoon Muziek Horen!	Adje Van 'T Padje	Free release	2016
Rock Now	Adaro & B-Front	Roughstate	2016
Executioner Style	Gunz For Hire	Roughstate	2016
Murder	Adaro	Roughstate	2016
Rock & Roll	Adaro & Enymion	Roughstate	2016
Legs In The Air	Adaro & Crypsis	Roughstate	2016
No Mercy	Gunz For Hire	Roughstate	2016
The Party Never Dies	Hard Driver & Adaro	Dirty Workz	2016
SMACK	Adaro & Hard Driver	Roughstate	2016
Party Medicine	Adaro & Outbreak	Roughstate	2017
Raggamuffin (MYST Remix)	Adaro	Roughstate	2017
Open The Gates (Public Enemies Remix)	Adaro & E-Force	Roughstate	2017
Welcome To Death Row	Gunz For Hire	Roughstate	2017
Bring You The Pain	Adaro & Digital Punk	Roughstate	2017
Armed & Dangerous	Gunz For Hire	Roughstate	2017
Circus Of Insanity (Official Intents Festival Anthem)	Digital Punk & Adaro	Unleashed	2017
The Show Of Madness	Endymion & Adaro	Nightbreed	2017
GODD (Adaro Remix)	Marco V	Be Yourself	2017
Disruption	Adaro & Jack Of Sound	Roughstate	2017
The Sky Is The Limit	Adaro	Roughstate	2017
Black Rain (Official Hard Bass Anthem)	Adaro ft. E-Life	Headliner	2018
The Otherside	Adaro	Roughstate	2018
One More Time	Adaro ft. Ellie	Roughstate	2018
Real Warrior	Gunz For Hire	Roughstate	2018
The Voice Of The Fire	Adaro	Roughstate	2018
Flame Up High	Adaro	Roughstate	2018
Bella Ciao	Gunz For Hire	Roughstate	2018
Long Hard Summer	E-Force & Adaro	Scantraxx Recordz	2018
We Will Be Immortal	Gunz For Hire	Roughstate	2018
Touch A Star	Adaro & B-Front ft. Dawnfire	Q-Dance	2018
Midnight Sky	Hard Driver & Adaro	Dirty Workz	2019
I'm Alive (Official Rebirth Anthem)	Adaro	Roughstate	2019
When The Stars Connect In Space	Adaro & MYST ft. Cadence XYZ	Q-Dance	2019
Blackout	Adaro & Kronos	Roughstate	2019
Battleborn	Ran-D, Frequencerz & Adaro	Roughstate	2019
Moonlight	Kronos & Adaro ft. PANE	Roughstate	2019
Don't Stop Me	Adaro & Clockartz	Q-Dance	2019
Don't Look	Gunz For Hire	Roughstate	2019
Murder (Invector Remix)	Adaro	Roughstate	2019
Kings Of Mayhem	Gunz For Hire	Roughstate	2019
Blood Brothers	Gunz For Hire	Roughstate	2019
My Eyes Spit Fire	Adaro & Rude Convict ft. LXCPR	Roughstate	2019
Flame Up High (Vertile Remix)	Adaro	Roughstate	2019
Dynamite	Adaro ft. Mark Vayne	Roughstate	2020
A Storm Is Coming (Ncrypta Remix)	Gunz For Hire	Roughstate	2020
The Phoenix Of The Night	B-Front & Adaro ft. Nikki Milou	Q-Dance	2020
Ghost Town	Adaro & Kronos	Roughstate	2020
I'm Alive (Official Rebirth Anthem) (Re-Style & Vertex Remix)	Adaro	Roughstate	2020
Reach For The Sky	Adaro & Digital Punk	Q-Dance	2020
Bolivia (G4H Blood Brothers Remix)	Gunz For Hire	Scantraxx Black	2020
Sicario	Gunz For Hire	Roughstate	2020
Strong	Adaro & Rejecta	Roughstate	2020
Wildfire (Adaro Remix)	Re-Style	Roughstate	2020
Every Breaking A Wave	Gunz For Hire	Roughstate	2020
Above It All	Adaro & Endymion	Q-Dance	2020
Deep In The Night	Frontliner & Adaro	Q-Dance	2020
A Deeper Space	Adaro	Roughstate	2020
Bring You The Pain (The Machine Remix)	Adaro & Digital Punk	Rough Recruits	2020
The Life	Adaro & Kronos ft. Nikki Milou	Roughstate	2020
Calling (Adaro Remix)	Sefa	Free release	2021
Heaven High	Adaro ft. Robin Vane	Roughstate	2021
Toy Soldiers	Gunz For Hire	Free release	2021
Legs In The Air (Cyrex Remix)	Adaro & Crypsis	Roughstate	2021
Walk With Me	Adaro & Vertile	Roughstate	2021
Seek & Destroy	Gunz For Hire	Roughstate	2021
Up 2 No Good	Kronos & Adaro	Scantraxx Recordz	2021
No Time To Sleep (Phrantic Remix)	Adaro	Scantraxx Black	2021
Ongedierte Van De Nacht	Gunz For Hire	Roughstate	2021
The Now And Then	Adaro & Aftershock	Roughstate	2021
The Underground	Adaro & Frontliner	Roughstate	2021
