= Deepack =

Dutch hardstyle duo

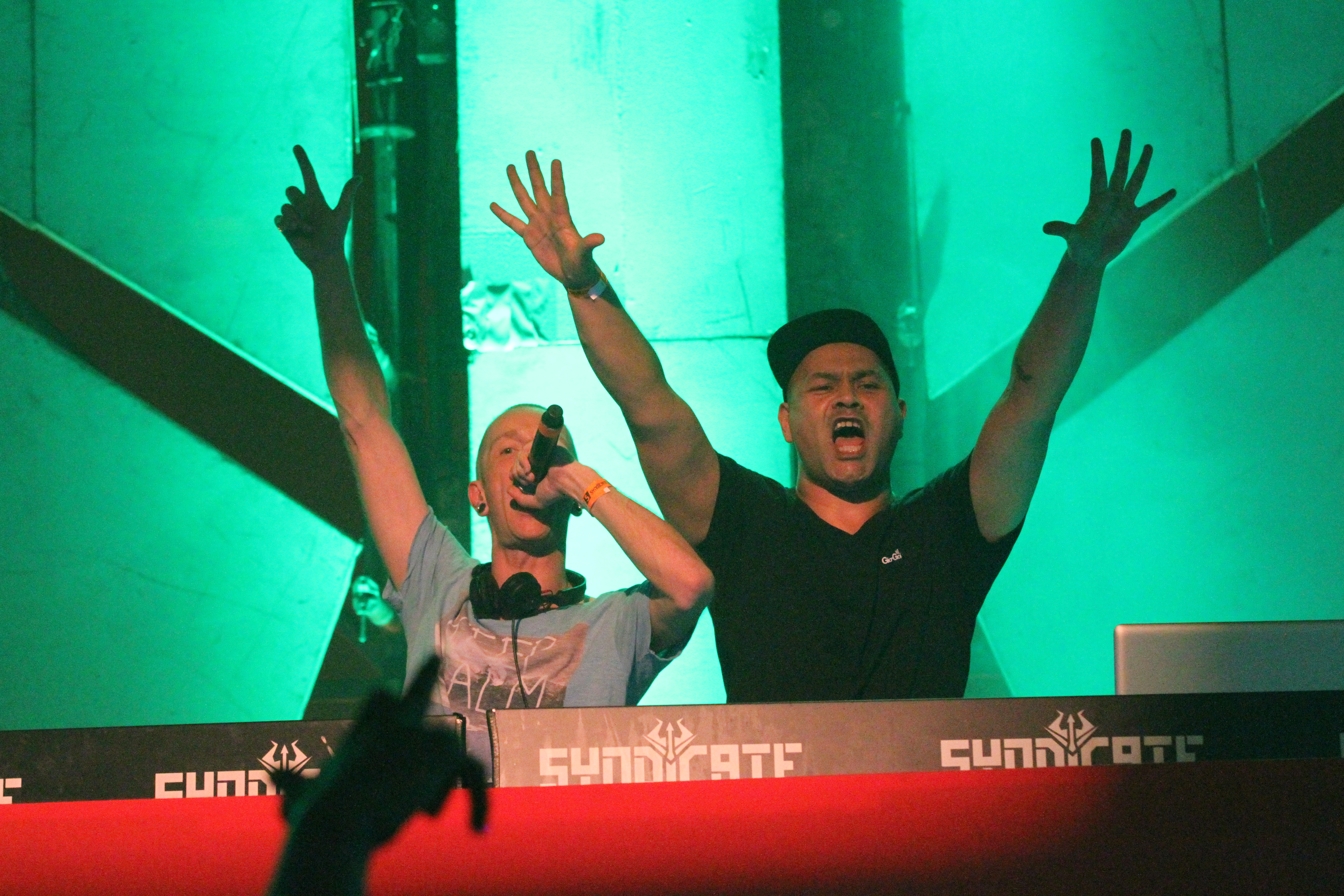
- Deepak at Syndicate-Festival 2013

Background information
- Also known as: Dock 45
- Genre: Hardstyle
- Labels: Hardcopy Recordings; Dutch Master Works; Scantraxx; Dirty Workz
- Website: www.deepack.nl

Deepack is a hardstyle duo from the Netherlands consisting of Frank Pechler and Marcel Van Der Zwan. The two met in high school in the 1990s, and started producing together directly after they graduated. In 2001, they teamed up with Dutch Hardcore legend Charly Lownoise. Their first releases were on the record label of Dutch party planning organization Q-dance. Deepack have had strong ties with Q-dance, even producing the anthem for their biggest event, Qlimax, in 2003.

They founded their own record label called "Hardcopy Recordings" in 2006, where artists like Josh & Wesz and the Stereotuners have had releases.

Deepack have collaborated with many hardstyle acts over the years, including D-Block & S-te-Fan, Showtek, and The Prophet. In 2010, they produced a remix of the anthem for the Q-dance party "In Qontrol" under the alias Dock 45, as they wanted a name to organize their house music releases under.
