= Ran-D =

Dutch DJ and music producer

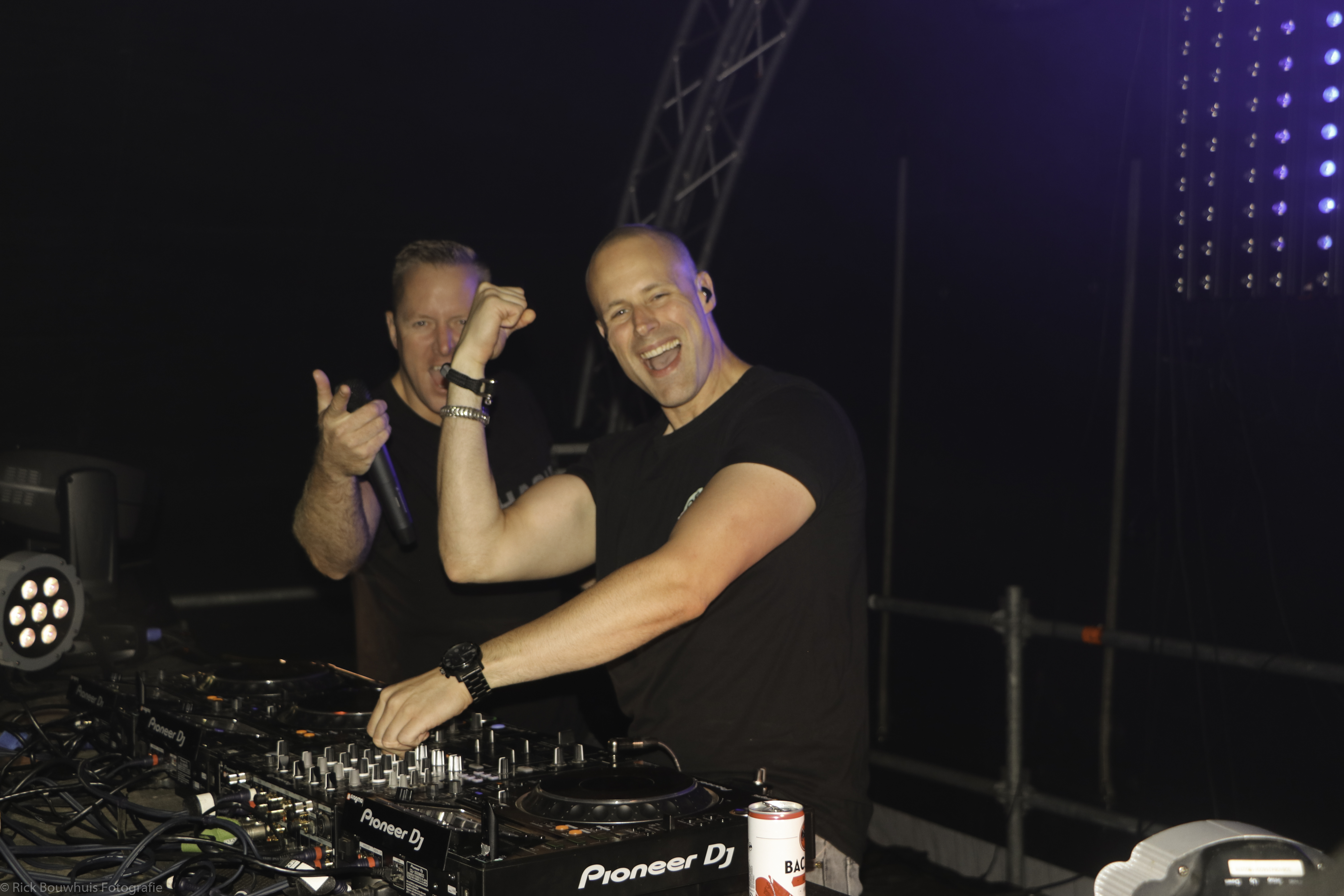
- Ran-D at a Dutch festival 'De Boeskool is Lös'

Background information
- Born: Randy Wieland; 18 May 1981 (age 45)
- Origin: Zeeland, Netherlands
- Genres: Hardstyle
- Years active: 2002–present
- Labels: Special Records, A2 Records, Roughstate Music
- Website: ran-d.com

Randy Wieland (born 18 May 1981), known professionally as Ran-D, is a Dutch DJ and music producer. He is known for making hardstyle music, and is half of the duo Gunz for Hire, alongside long-time collaborator, Adaro.

Ran-D has several collaborations with other prominent hardstyle artists, including Alpha2, Zatox, Zany, B-Front, Phuture Noize, Crypsis, Digital Punk and D-Block & S-Te-Fan.

He performed at several hardstyle events, including Qlimax, Hard Bass, Defqon.1 Festival (in Australia, Netherlands and in Chile), Daydream Mexico, Decibel Outdoor Festival, Reverze, Knockout Outdoor, Q-BASE and The Qontinent.

== Career ==
=== 2006–14: Early Years ===
In interviews, Ran-D claims he has been attending hardstyle events since 2001, including the early editions of Qlimax and Defqon.1. He has also spoken about the loss of his father and how the friendships he made in the hardstyle scene greatly supported his mental wellbeing through difficult life events. Ran-D has been actively making hardstyle music since 2006, when he released his first track "D-Pression" (with A-Drive) on Special Records. After his debut release, Ran-D dropped another two tracks, "Bomb this Place" and "Rage" on Droppin' Beats in 2007.

Following these early releases, Ran-D moved on to release music on A2 Records in 2008. A2 Records was a sub-label of Scantraxx, founded by the Alpha² (pronounced "Alpha Twins"), and dedicated to promoting more raw hardstyle sounds. On New Years Eve of the same year, the Alpha² invited Ran-D and B-Front to play at Q-Dance's "The Qountdown" event. Many years later, Ran-D attributes the feeling he got playing at this event as his first big break, after years of going to hardstyle parties an attendee.

Ran-D released several singles during his time on A2, including "River of Sound", part of his first release on the label, and "My Name is Hardstyle", one of his earliest collaborations with Adaro. His breakout track, "Living for the Moment", as well as his collaborative Rebirth Anthem (with B-Front) for the festival's 2011 edition were also released during his time at A2. Ran-D continued to release music on A2 Records and parent label Scantraxx for seven years.

=== 2015: Roughstate Music, Defqon.1 Anthem ===
After much speculation from journalists and industry insiders, in March 2015, alongside Frequencerz, Adaro and B-Front, Ran-D founded the hardstyle record label Roughstate Music. Alongside the four founding artists, the label also committed to releasing music from collaborative acts between its members, including B-Freqz (B-Front & Frequencerz) and Gunz For Hire (Ran-D and Adaro).

Continuing his eventful start to the year, Ran-D debuted the new anthem for the 2015 edition of Defqon.1 Festival at Qapital in April. The following month, "No Guts, No Glory" (featuring vocals from dutch hip-hip artist Skits Vicious) was released on Q-Dance's record label, in the lead up to the event.

=== 2016–18: X-Qlusive Ran-D, Popular Singles ===
In January 2017, Ran-D was invited to host his own X-Qlusive Event in collaboration with Q-Dance. It was held in the AFAS Live in Amsterdam (formerly known as the Heineken Music Hall). In an interview with HardstyleMag, he claimed the process for preparing for the event was demanding, as he is a self-described perfectionist, but he also said of the event:

"It felt like the crown on my work, and a celebration of my career together with all my friends. The crowd was just amazing and the energy in the AFAS was that night was really unique. All these moments – I had goosebumps all over my body. I’m truly proud of this night!"

At the end of 2016, Ran-D first played a cover version of "Zombie" by The Cranberries during a surprise performance at Qlimax. According to the event promoters, he was still in the studio finishing the track mere hours before the set. This song amassed traction amongst hardstyle crowds and later, mainstream EDM fans, with its "striking lyrics". The song was being played by mainstream acts such as Dimitri Vegas & Like Mike, Armin Van Buuren and Hardwell, in front of more broader-appeal audiences. Many report the song as being their introduction to the hardstyle genre. In 2020, to celebrate the end of the decade, Q-Dance held a voting competition and music event known as "Dediqated", where fans voted for their favourite hardstyle tracks of all time. "Zombie" finished in 11th place. As of writing, it is regarded within the hardstyle community as one of the most played hardstyle tracks of all time, with over 150 million streams on Youtube, primarily due to all the attention it received from mainstream EDM audiences. Prior to "Zombie", one of Ran-D's most popular songs was titled "FCK EDM".

In 2018, following the success of Zombie, Ran-D released "Hurricane," which, at time of writing, has nearly 70 million streams on Youtube. Hurricane was awarded 1st place in the 2018 Q-Dance Top-100 Hardstyle Tracks voting competition. To date, it is the only time he has won the annual competition.

=== 2019–20: We Rule The Night ===
At Ran-D's X-Qlusive event in early 2017, he played a live set titled We Rule The Night, featuring collaborations: "Victorious" (with Clockartz), "Drugs" (with Act of Rage) and "Suicidal Superstar" (with Phuture Noize). Following the event and special live set, he began talking about his debut album of the same name, with some speculating on the tracklist, anticipating the inclusion of unreleased music. Later the same year, in a Facebook Q&A session, Ran-D admitted that none of the tracks for the album were completed, attributing this to his busy touring schedule. He remained adamant, however, that progress on the album was continuing.

New information on the album was scarce throughout 2018 and the majority of 2019. In October 2019, Ran-D announced that We Rule The Night was available for pre-order, dropping a trailer which contained a short speech highlighting his passion for the project and the journey he undertook in creating the album:

"It has been quite a journey to create an album that truly reflects who I am as a Hardstyle lover, a producer and a person. I’ve played all over the world and it has been a huge source of inspiration to meet all you dedicated Hardstyle lovers, your passion and love for Hardstyle has given me so much energy."

Towards the end of 2019, Ran-D appeared on D-Block & S-Te-Fan's podcast, where he hinted at a We Rule The Night event in March 2020, with the event potentially touring afterwards. At this stage, no release date had been announced for the album. Once March 2020 had rolled around, no event had gone on sale, and there was still no announcement of an album release date. Due to the lack of progress on the album, which he once again attributed to touring, Ran-D apologised and offered the album to everyone who pre-ordered for free.

During the Covid-19 Lockdowns in early/mid 2020 resulting in the suspension of all hardstyle events and subsequently the touring schedules of all artists, Ran-D took the opportunity to spend more time in the studio. We Rule The Night was officially released on the 1st of May, 2020, over 3 years after the concept initially debuted.

=== 2021–23: Qlimax Anthem, Illuminate ===
In early 2020, Q-Dance approached Ran-D to produce the anthem for the next edition of Qlimax. Ran-D recalls playing the melody the night he was approached by Q-Dance, with the final track itself taking over 6 weeks to perfect in the studio. While lockdowns and public health measures stopped Qlimax from taking place in 2020, the anthem's associated event took place in its regular calendar position at the end of 2021. The anthem featured vocals from compatriot metal singer Charlotte Wessels. "The Reawakening" was released in October 2021, with Qlimax taking place a month later. While it was his first opportunity to produce the Qlimax anthem as a solo act, he previously produced the 2013 anthem as Gunz for Hire.

In 2022, Ran-D finally had the opportunity to perform his previously promised We Rule The Night event, hosted at the Turbinehalle Oberhausen. Following this one-off event, he began to work towards his second studio album, Illuminate. Inspired by similar themes to We Rule The Night, Illuminate saw Ran-D broadening his production to present a more versatile sounding tracklist. The album included euphoric tracks, the raw hardstyle he had become synonymous with, as well as a track heavily inspired by hardcore. In 2023, he performed several Illuminate themed live-shows, including the concept's public debut at Rebirth Festival in April, through to its final appearance, playing at EPIK in Sydney in December. Illuminate was released in November of 2023.

=== 2024–Present: Further Live Acts, Leaving Roughstate ===
In 2024, Ran-D started performing Untamed, his newest live act. He opened Defqon.1 Mainstage the same year, and released his second collaboration with Galactixx (who officially joined Ran-D's Roughstate in 2023 after being a recruit for 7 years). As of writing, "Untamed" (the title track for the aforementioned live act) is his last original release on Roughstate Music. Since 2024, he's released music on Scantraxx (separate collaborations with D-Block & S-Te-Fan and KELTEK), Smash The House (a remix of Tom O'Dell's 2012 hit, Another Love, with Mark with a K), Q-Dance Records (a remix of Gotye & Kimbra's Somebody That I Used to Know with Devin Wild) and the Decibel Outdoor Anthem (with Unresolved). In 2025, alongside starting his new live act Resonance, he released "King Kong" on a brand new label: Rave Era, presumed to be his own sub-label.

In 2026, Ran-D released "Resonate" on Rave Era, and changed the name of his Resonance live act to match the new song, otherwise keeping branding identical. While nothing has been publicly announced about Rave Era or an official split from Roughstate Music, he is no long mentioned as a solo-act on any promotional material. Netizens were quick to point out that his two new releases on Rave Era have youtube metadata claiming to be provided by Toffmusic BVBA, the parent label of hardstyle record label Dirty Workz.

== Gunz For Hire ==
In 2011, Ran-D and frequent collaborator Adaro began producing music and playing as a hardstyle duo as a new live-act: Gunz For Hire. The name "Guns for Hire" was chosen because of its combination of "classical mob" and "futuristic hitman" styles, and because of web domain availability. The Z was added for hardstyle brandin: other hardstyle acts such as Headhunterz, Wildstylez, and Sound Rusherz ended with a Z. Both artists have also talked about their love for horror aesthetics influencing how they present themselves.

They are known for playing in formal attire, mimicing Italian mafia outfits, wearing masks to hide their faces (to distinguish the group from their individual careers), and having an energetic stage presence which extends beyond just "a guy behind a laptop"; a common trope for live acts at the time. When Gunz For Hire began performing, hardstyle was still primarily dominated by euphoric, melodic and 'nustyle' sounds. The combined live act intended to present fans a darker hardstyle aesthetic.

In 2013, the duo finished 63rd in the annual DJMag Top-100 DJs voting competition. Since their inception, Gunz For Hire have released songs including "Bella Ciao," "Sorrow," "Bolivia," "Plata O Plomo," "No Mercy", "Armed & Dangerous", "Firestone", "Hard Knock Life" and "The Devil's Hour". Gunz For Hire have performed at several notable hardstyle events, including Qlimax (for which they made the anthem in 2013), Hard Bass, Defqon.1, Intents Festival, Knockout Outdoor, Supremacy and Rebirth Festival.

While Ran-D's solo career is no longer affiliated with Roughstate Music, Gunz For Hire releases are still on the record label. In 2026, the duo celebrated 15 years together, and announced a tour in commemoration. They have also announced an anniversary show planned for the end of 2026, including guests from Roughstate, previous collaborators from Ran-D's career (including the Alpha²), and a new B2B concept with a fellow masked performer, hardcore artist Angerfist.

== Discography ==
=== Albums ===
- We Rule The Night (2020) - Roughstate Records
- Illuminate (2023) - Roughstate Records

=== Singles & EPs ===
Name	Artist(s)	Label	Year
"D-Pression"	Ran-D	Special Records	2006
"River of Sound"	Ran-D	A2 Records (sub-label of Scantraxx Recordz)	2008
"Living for the Moment" / "Inner Child"	Ran-D	A2 Records	2009
"Say Yeah"	Ran-D vs Alpha2	A2 Records	2009
"My Name Is Hardstyle"	Ran-D vs Adaro	A2 Records	2009
"Under Attack"	Ran-D & Adaro	A2 Records	2010
"Struggle for Existence"	Ran-D & Adaro	A2 Records	2010
"Son of Torture"	Ran-D & Zany	Fusion Records	2011
"Rebirth (Official Anthem 2011)"	Ran-D & B-Front	A2 Records	2011
"Kings of the Underground"	Gunz for Hire	A2 Records	2012
"Survivors"	Ran-D & Digital Punk	A2 Records	2012
"X"	Ran-D vs. Villain	Scantraxx	2012
"#MyWay"	Ran-D	Scantraxx	2012
"Bolivia"	Gunz for Hire	A2 Records	2012
"Dimensions (Reverze 2013 Anthem)"	Ran-D	Zoo Records	2013
"Never Scared"	Ran-D	A2 Records	2013
"Hectic"	Ran-D vs. Zatox	Scantraxx	2013
"No Cure"	Ran-D & Redixx	A2 Records	2013
"Inside Our Mind (Fantasy Island Anthem 2013)"	Ran-D & Crypsis	A2 Records	2013
"Sorrow"	Gunz for Hire (feat. Ellie)	A2 Records	2013
"Gangsters Don't Dance (Noisecontrollers Remix)"	Gunz for Hire	A2 Records	2013
"I Need You"	Ran-D	A2 Records	2013
"The Massacre"	Gunz for Hire	A2 Records	2013
"Enter the Twilight Zone (Q-Base Anthem 2013)"	Ran-D	Q-Dance Records	2013
"Bolivia (Endymion Remix)"	Gunz for Hire	A2 Records	2013
"The Message"	Ran-D & B-Front	A2 Records	2013
"Immortal (Qlimax 2013 Anthem)"	Gunz for Hire	A2 Records	2013
"Antidote"	Ran-D & Endymion	A2 Records	2014
"Animals"	Ran-D & Hard Driver	Scantraxx	2014
"The Hunt (Intents Anthem 2014)"	Ran-D	Scantraxx	2014
"Swagger"	Gunz for Hire	A2 Records	2014
"No Guts, No Glory"	Ran-D (feat. Skits Vicious)	Q-Dance Records	2015
"This Is Los Angeles"	Gunz for Hire	Roughstate	2015
"I Am Legion"	Ran-D	Roughstate	2015
"Wolfchild"	Ran-D	Roughstate	2015
"FCK EDM"	Ran-D	Roughstate	2015
"Firestarter"	Ran-D	Roughstate	2015
"Paranoid"	Ran-D & Phuture Noize	Roughstate	2015
"Crossroads (Clockartz & Chris One Remix)"	Ran-D	A2 Records	2015
"Plata O Plomo"	Gunz for Hire	Roughstate	2016
"Shut Up"	Ran-D & Frequencerz	Roughstate	2016
"I'm a Criminal"	Gunz for Hire	Roughstate	2016
"Executioner Style"	Gunz for Hire	Roughstate	2016
"United (Official Decibel Outdoor Festival Anthem 2016)"	Ran-D (feat. LXCPR)	B2S Records	2016
"Drugs"	Ran-D & Act of Rage	Roughstate	2017
"Zombie"	Ran-D	Roughstate (re-released on Armada Music in 2018)	2017
"Armed & Dangerous"	Gunz For Hire	Roughstate	2017
"Suicidal Superstar"	Ran-D & Phuture Noize	Roughstate	2017
"Welcome to Death Row"	Gunz For Hire	Roughstate	2017
"Band of Brothers"	Ran-D	Roughstate	2017
"Inside My Head"	Gunz For Hire	Self-Released	2018
"Real Warrior"	Gunz For Hire	Roughstate	2018
"Bella Ciao"	Gunz For Hire	Roughstate	2018
"Hurricane"	Ran-D	Roughstate	2018
"We Will Be Immortal"	Gunz For Hire	Roughstate	2018
"Nirvana"	Ran-D	Roughstate	2018
"Not an Addict"	Ran-D & Psyko Punkz (feat. K's Choice)	Armada Music	2019
"Run from Reality"	Ran-D & Endymion (feat. LePrince)	Roughstate	2019
"Battleborn"	Ran-D & Frequencerz & Adaro	Roughstate	2019
"The Sound of Silence"	Ran-D, Adaro & Kronos	Self-Released	2019
"Warriors"	Wildstylez & Ran-D	Q-Dance Records	2020
"Armageddon"	Ran-D & ANDY SVGE	Roughstate	2020
"Dreamers Of The Universe"	Ran-D (feat. Mark Vayne & Diesel)	Roughstate	2020
"Sleepless Nights"	Ran-D & Hard Driver	Roughstate	2020
"Fight Fire with Fire"	Ran-D & Le-Prince	Roughstate	2020
"Living For The Moment (2020 Remix)"	Ran-D	Scantraxx	2020
"Dance with the Devil"	Ran-D & D-Sturb	Roughstate	2021
"Virtual Reality"	Ran-D & Kronos	Roughstate	2021
"Heaven & Hell"	Ran-D & XCEPTION & Diesel	Roughstate	2021
"The Reawakening (Qlimax 2021 Anthem)"	Ran-D (feat. Charlotte Wessels)	Q-Dance Records	2021
"We Are The Storm"	Ran-D & Sound Rush (feat. Le-Prince)	Roughstate	2021
"If Tomorrow Never Comes"	Ran-D, Galactixx & E-Life	Roughstate	2021
"One Last Time"	Sub Zero Project & Ran-D	Dirty Workz	2022
"Out of Control"	Ran-D	Roughstate	2022
"The Raven of The Night"	Ran-D	Roughstate	2022
"Never Shut Us Down (Shutdown Festival 2022 Anthem)"	Ran-D	Roughstate	2022
"Anesthesia"	Ran-D & Rejecta	Roughstate	2022
"Code of the Warrior"	Ran-D & E-Life	Q-Dance Records	2023
"The Nightmare Factory"	Ran-D	Roughstate	2023
"Illuminate"	Ran-D	Roughstate	2023
"Intoxicated"	Ran-D & Invector	Roughstate	2023
"Never Going Home"	Ran-D & Villain (feat. XCeption)	Roughstate	2023
"Legendary Days"	Ran-D & Hard Driver	Roughstate	2023
"Our Legacy"	Ran-D & B-Front	Roughstate	2023
"Born to Be Free"	Ran-D, The Prophet & Le-Prince	Scantraxx	2023
"Thunderbolts of Lightning"	Ran-D & Adaro	Self-Released	2023
"Mr. Navigator (Ran-D Remix)"	Armin van Buuren vs Tempo Giusto	Armind	2023
"Ride or Die"	Ran-D & Rebelion	Acid Reign (sub-label of Dirty Workz)	2024
"When The Gods Call"	Ran-D (feat. Diandra Faye)	Defqon.1 Records	2024
"The Other Side"	Ran-D & Atilax	Q-Dance Records	2024
"Viper"	Ran-D (feat. Atilax)	Roughstate	2024
"The Perfect Storm"	Ran-D & Galactixx (feat. Micah Martin)	Roughstate	2024
"Untamed"	Ran-D	Roughstate	2024
"Behind Enemy Lines"	Ran-D & D-Block & S-Te-Fan	Scantraxx	2024
"Never Change"	KELTEK & Ran-D	Scantraxx	2024
"Another Love"	Ran-D & Mark With A K	Smash The House	2024
"Alone"	Ran-D	Defqon.1 Records	2025
"Somebody That I Used To Know"	Ran-D & Devin Wild	Q-Dance Records	2025
"Stuck In The Middle"	Ran-D & Vertile	Vertile Music	2025
"Cosmic Frequency (Official Decibel Outdoor 2025 Anthem)"	Ran-D & Unresolved	Decibel Outdoor Records	2025
"Shivers"	D-Block & S-Te-Fan & Ran-D	Defqon.1 Records	2025
"King Kong"	Ran-D	Rave Era	2025
"Resonate"	Ran-D	Rave Era	2026
"Drugs (Crypsis Remix)"	Ran-D & Act Of Rage	Roughstate	2026
