= Qlimax =

Music festival

- Genre: Hardstyle, Hardcore, Hardhouse, Hard trance (formerly), Subground (formerly)
- Location: Netherlands
- Years active: 2000–2024
- Founders: Q-dance
- Website: Q-dance Website

Qlimax was an annual hardstyle and hard dance event in the Netherlands. It was a major attraction held by Q-dance, and considered to be one of the leading hardstyle events, attracting nearly 30,000 people annually. It contained some of the most sophisticated production and setup, as well as sound system for any Q-dance event. On the 25th of July 2024, Q-Dance announced that Qlimax 2024 would be the very last edition. After being held at several venues, the event settled at the GelreDome in Arnhem in 2003.

== History ==
During the first few years following Qlimax's debut, the event used to have several editions each year. From 2004, it was changed to the third or fourth week of November. At first it was held at the Beursgebouw (Eindhoven) and then moved to various other venues such as the SilverDome (Zoetermeer) and Heineken Music Hall (Amsterdam), but eventually settled at the GelreDome in 2003 (Arnhem).

== Artists and event ==
Many artists consider being chosen to play at Qlimax as a highlight, since the event was used to showcase the most successful artists in their respective genre. The beginning saw the lineup featuring genres ranging from Hardhouse to Techno. This was changed to traditionally begin with one Hardtrance act, numerous Hardstyle acts and then finish off with one Hardcore/Gabber act. This was changed in 2008 with the removal of the Jumpstyle act and in 2009 with the replacement of the Hardtrance act to one playing early Hardstyle.

In 2021, the event would have taken place during the day for the first time to adhere to the COVID-19 pandemic precautions and guidelines at that time in the Netherlands. A week before the event was due, the event was cancelled and adapted to an online event.

On the 25th of July 2024, Q-Dance announced that Qlimax 2024 would be the very last edition. With this announcement, Q-Dance had ended one of the oldest hardstyle events.

The sound, light, pyrotechnic and stage setup at Qlimax was substantial. Around 350 L'Acoustics speaker boxes were deployed in the arena, with a majority being suspended from the ceiling. The conventional part of the lighting setup was controlled from 3 light desks, and the laser show was done by a certified laser show operator. Booths for technicians were placed out in the crowd, giving them the overview they needed, as well as the sound coverage needed to ensure everyone was having the most ideal possible sound at all times.

== Anthems ==
Like most of the Q-dance events, an anthem was made every year by the headlining DJ (with the exception of 2001 and 2002) to represent that edition. Below is a list of the anthems for each edition:

Dutch Anthems

- 2003: The Prophet – Follow the Leader
- 2003: Deepack – The Prophecy
- 2004: Future Tribes – Deadlock (Unofficial)
- 2005: DJ Zany – Science & Religion
- 2006: Alpha² – The Dark Side (Co-produced by JDX)
- 2007: Headhunterz – The Power of the Mind
- 2008: Technoboy – Next Dimensional World
- 2009: D-Block & S-te-Fan – The Nature Of Our Mind
- 2010: Brennan Heart – Alternate Reality
- 2011: Zatox – No Way Back
- 2012: Psyko Punkz – Fate or Fortune
- 2013: Gunz For Hire ft. Ruffian – Immortal Essence
- 2014: Noisecontrollers – The Source Code of Creation
- 2015: Atmozfears – Equilibrium
- 2016: Coone – Rise of the Celestials
- 2017: Wildstylez – Temple of Light
- 2018: Sub Zero Project – The Game Changer
- 2019: B-Front – Symphony of Shadows
- 2020: None (each artist made an anthem for the source movie)
- 2021: Ran-D ft. Charlotte Wessels – The Reawakening
- 2022: Ran-D ft. Charlotte Wessels – The Reawakening
- 2023: Hard Driver – Enter The Void
- 2024: None (the overall theme was The Final Prophecy)

== Editions ==
Year	Date	Location	Theme	Anthem	MC	Lineup (in no particular order)
2000	3 June	Beursgebouw, Eindhoven (Holland)	N/A	N/A	Ruffian	Captain Tinrib, Dana, Nick Sentience, Armin van Buuren, Ferry Corsten, Ian M, Remy, Rank 1, Jon the Dentist, The Advent, CJ Bolland, and Pavo.
2001	2 June	Heineken Music Hall, Amsterdam	N/A	N/A	Ruffian	Acid Junkies, Alpha Twins, Bas & Ram, Dana, Gary D, Jon The Baptist, Kai Tracid, Lisa Loud, Marco V, Michel de Hey, and Mauro Picotto.
2002	6 April	Thialf Stadion, Heerenveen	Cosmos	N/A	Ruffian	Captain Tinrib (Live), Cosmic Spoils, Dana, Gary D, Kai Tracid, Pavo, Technoboy, and Warmduscher.
2002	21 September	SilverDome, Zoetermeer	Infection	N/A	Ruffian	Alpha Twins, Bas & Ram, Charly Lownoise, Dana, The Darkman, Gizmo, Haze & Abyss, DJ Isaac, Luna, Melanie de Tria, Pavo, Pila, Sunny D, Technoboy, and Zenith DJ.
2003	12 April	Thialf Stadion, Heerenveen	Follow The Leader	The Prophet - Follow The Leader	Ruffian	Dana, Gary D, Isaac, Luna, Pavo, Pila, Super Marco May, Technoboy, The Prophet (Anthem Show), and Zenith DJ.
2003	22 November	GelreDome, Arnhem	The Prophecy	Deepack - The Prophecy	Ruffian	Bas & Ram, Daniele Mondello, Deepack (anthem show), Kai Tracid, Luna, Max B Grant, Pavo, The Prophet, Technoboy, and Bass D & King Matthew
2004	27 November	GelreDome, Arnhem	Destiny's Path	Future Tribes - Deadlock (Unofficial)	Mouth Of Madness	Charly Lownoise, Dana, Luna, Igor S, Outblast, Pavo, Technoboy & The Prophet, and Zany.
2005	19 November	GelreDome, Arnhem	Science & Religion	DJ Zany - Science & Religion	Ruffian	Bas & Ram, The Beholder & Ballistic, Pila, Zany (Anthem Show), The Prophet, Luna, DJ Isaac, Alpha Twins, Technoboy, and Vince.
2006	25 November	GelreDome, Arnhem	The Darkside	Alpha Twins - The Darkside (Co-Produced with JDX)	Ruffian	Alpha Twins (anthem show), Dana, Luna, The Prophet feat. Headhunterz, Promo, DJ Ruthless, Showtek, Tatanka, Zany & Donkey Rollers (Live), and Yves de Ruyter.
2007	17 November	GelreDome, Arnhem	The Power of the Mind	Headhunterz - The Power of the Mind	Ruffian	Fausto, DJ Ghost, Brennan Heart, Showtek (feat. MC DV8), Headhunterz (Live) (Anthem Show), Technoboy, The Prophet & Zany, and DJ Neophyte.
2008	22 November	GelreDome, Arnhem	Next Dimensional World	Technoboy - Next Dimensional World	Ruffian	Mark Sherry, Showtek, Headhunterz (Live), Project One, D-Block & S-te-Fan, Technoboy (anthem show), Tatanka, and Zany & Vince.
2009	21 November	GelreDome, Arnhem	The Nature of Our Mind	D-Block & S-te-Fan - The Nature of Our Mind	Ruffian	DJ Isaac, A-Lusion, Davide Sonar (Live), Brennan Heart, Technoboy, D-Block & S-te-Fan (anthem show), Headhunterz, Noisecontrollers (feat. MC Renegade), Deepack, and Noize Suppressor (LIVE).
2010	27 November	GelreDome, Arnhem	Alternate Reality	Brennan Heart - Alternate Reality	Ruffian	Pavelow, DJ Stephanie, Wildstylez, Wildstylez & Noisecontrollers (Surprise Act), TNT aka Technoboy & Tuneboy (Live), Brennan Heart (Anthem Show), D-Block & S-te-Fan, Psyko Punkz (Live), Zatox, and Endymion vs. Evil Activities.
2011	26 November	GelreDome, Arnhem	Experiment Dome	Zatox - No Way Back	Ruffian	Stana, Coone, Headhunterz, Zany & The Pitcher (feat. MC DV8), Noisecontrollers, Zatox (anthem show), Ran-D, Gunz For Hire, and The Prophet.
2012	24 November	GelreDome, Arnhem	Fate Or Fortune	Psyko Punkz - Fate Or Fortune	Ruffian (with Villain as a B2B MC)	A*S*Y*S, Wildstylez, Frontliner, Isaac, Technoboy, Zatox, Psyko Punkz (Anthem Show), Brennan Heart, B-Front (feat. MC DV8), Adaro, and Evil Activities (feat. E-Life).
2013	23 November	GelreDome, Arnhem	Immortal Essence	Gunz For Hire ft. Ruffian - Immortal	Ruffian	Acti, Wildstylez & Max Enforcer, Code Black, Coone, Gunz For Hire (anthem show feat. Ruffian), Noisecontrollers, Zatox, Alpha Twins, and Mad Dog & Art of Fighters.
2014	22 November	GelreDome, Arnhem	The Source Code of Creation	Noisecontrollers – The Source Code of Creation	Ruffian	Audiofreq & Technoboy, Headhunterz, Atmozfears, Frontliner, Noisecontrollers (Anthem Show), Ran-D, Crypsis, Endymion, The Viper, and Partyraiser.
2015	21 November	GelreDome, Arnhem	Equilibrium	Atmozfears - Equilibrium	Villain	DJ Isaac, Bass Modulators, Atmozfears (anthem show), Noisecontrollers & Wildstylez (90 minute set), Brennan Heart, Ran-D, Zatox & Adaro (DJ), Frequencerz, Deetox, and Tha Playah.
2016	19 November	GelreDome, Arnhem	Rise of the Celestials	Coone - Rise of the Celestials	Villain	Tuneboy, Audiotricz, Brennan Heart (vs. Blademasterz), Coone (Anthem Show), Project One, Bass Modulators, Frequencerz, B-Front, Angerfist, and Ran-D.
2017	18 November	GelreDome, Arnhem	Temple of Light	Wildstylez - Temple of Light	Villain	TNT aka Technoboy & Tuneboy, D-Block & S-Te-Fan, Wildstylez (Anthem Show), Da Tweekaz, Noisecontrollers & Atmozfears, Frequencerz, Phuture Noize (Surprise Act), Sub Zero Project, Gunz for Hire, and N-Vitral.
2018	24 November	GelreDome, Arnhem	The Game Changer	Sub Zero Project - The Game Changer	Villain	Luna, Sound Rush, Coone, Bass Modulators, Wildstylez (LIVE), Sub Zero Project (Anthem Show), Tweekacore, Phuture Noize, B-Freqz, and Dr. Peacock (feat. Da Mouth of Madness).
2019	23 November	GelreDome, Arnhem	Symphony of Shadows	B-Front - Symphony of Shadows	Villain	The Qreator, KELTEK, Sound Rush, D-Block & S-Te-Fan, Headhunterz, B-Front (Anthem Show), Ran-D, D-Sturb, Rejecta, Radical Redemption (feat. MC Nolz), and Miss K8.
2020	28 November	Various location (The Source); Centrale Markthallen, Amsterdam (Afterparty; Streaming)	The Source (as visual concept album)	Qlimax The Source OST	Villain	The Qreator, Sub Zero Project, Phuture Noize, Headhunterz & JDX, B-Front, KELTEK, and Sefa.
2021	20 November	Centrale Markthallen, Amsterdam (Streaming)	Distorted Reality (originally as The Reawakening)	Ran-D ft. Charlotte Wessels - The Reawakening	Villain	Zany, D-Block & S-Te-Fan, The Qreator, Sub Zero Project, Ran-D, Shadow Priests (KELTEK, Devin Wild, Frequencerz, Vertile; Surprise Act), Sound Rush, Rebelion, D-Sturb & Act of Rage, and Sefa & Dr. Peacock.
2022	26 November	GelreDome, Arnhem	The Reawakening	Ran-D ft. Charlotte Wessels - The Reawakening	Villain	Zany, The Qreator, Sound Rush, D-Block & S-Te-Fan, Ran-D (Anthem Show), Sub Zero Project, The Prophet, Rebelion, D-Sturb & Act Of Rage, Rooler, and Sefa.
2023	18 November	GelreDome, Arnhem	Enter the Void	Hard Driver – Enter The Void	Villain	Deepack, Brennan Heart present Blademasterz, Showtek, TNT (Technoboy & Tuneboy), Hard Driver (Anthem Show), Devin Wild, The Qreator, B-Front x Phuture Noize: The Enlightenment, Shadow Priests (Cryex & The Purge & Adjuzt), Vertile, Warface, Deadly Guns, MC Villain.
2024	16 November	GelreDome, Arnhem	The Final Prophecy	N/A	Villain	Deepack vs Luna vs Zany, Wildstylez & Noisecontrollers, Coone, The Darkside of Hardstyle, Brennan Heart aka Blademasterz, D-Block & S-Te-Fan, Phases of Hardstyle, TNT (Technoboy & Tuneboy), Sub Zero Project, The Power of the Mind [HeadHunterz's Tribute], B-Front & Phuture Noize, Adaro, Rebelion, D-Sturb & Act of Rage, Mad Dog, Sefa & Dr.Peacock

=== Most significant artists ===
DJ's	jun-00	okt-00	feb-01	jun-01	dec-01	apr-02	sep-02	apr-03	nov-03	2004	2005	2006	2007	2008	2009	2010	2011	2012	2013	2014	2015	2016	2017	2018	2019	2022	2023	2024	Total
Armin Van Buuren	X																												1
Captain Tinrib	X	X				X																							3
CJ Bolland	X																												1
Ferry Corsten	X																												1
Ian M	X																												1
Jon the Dentist	X		X	X																									3
Rank 1	X																												1
Remi	X		X																										2
The Advent	X																												1
Dana		X	X	X	X	X	X	X		X		X																	9
Nick Sentience		X	X																										2
Pavo		X	X		X	X	X	X	X	X																			8
Billy Bunter			X																										1
K90			X																										1
Rubec			X																										1
Steve Hill			X																										1
Astrid			X																										1
Gary D			X	X		X		X																					4
Marusha			X																										1
Pila			X		X		X	X		X	X																		6
Spider			X																										1
The Scientist			X																										1
Laidback Luke			X																										1
Sunny D			X		X		X																						3
Acid Junkies			X	X																									2
Kai Tracid				X					X																				2
Lisa Loud				X																									1
Mauro picotto				X																									1
Alpha2				X	X		X				X	X							X										6
Bas & Ram				X	X		X		X																				4
Marco V				X																									1
Michel de Hey				X																									1
Promo												X																	1
Melanie di Tria					X		X																						2
Russenmafia					X																								1
Technoboy					X	X	X	X	X	X	X		X	X	X			X		X									12
Warpbrothers					X																								1
Don Diablo					X																								1
Luna					X		X	X	X	X	X	X												X				X	9
Cosmic Gate						X																							1
Warmduscher						X																							1
Darkman							X																						1
Charly Lownoise							X			X																			2
Zenith							X	X																					2
Gizmo							X																						1
Icaac							X	X			X				X			X			X								6
Haze & Abyss							X																						1
Super Marco May								X																					1
The Prophet								X	X	X	X	X	X				X									X			8
Deepack									X						X												X	X	4
Bass-D & King Matthew									X																				1
Danielle Mondello									X																				1
Max B. Grant									X																				1
Igor S										X																			1
Outblast										X																			1
Zany										X	X		X	X			X									X		X	7
Balistic											X																		1
The Beholder											X																		1
Vince											X			X															2
Bass & Ram											X																		1
Yves Deruyter												X																	1
Headhunterz												X	X	X	X		X			X					X				7
Ruthless												X																	1
Showtek												X	X	X													X		4
Tatanka												X		X															2
Donkey Rollers												X																	1
Brennan Heart													X		X	X		X			X	X						X	7
Fausto													X																1
Ghost													X																1
NeoPhyte													X																1
D-Block & S-te-Fan														X	X	X							X		X	X		X	7
Mark Sherry														X															1
Project One														X								X							2
A-Lusion															X														1
Davide Sonar															X														1
Noisecontrollers															X		X			X	X		X					X	6
Noise Suppressor															X				X										2
Endymion																X				X									2
Evil Activities																X		X											2
Pavelow																X													1
Psyko Punkz																X		X											2
Stephanie																X													1
TNT																X							X				X	X	4
Wildstylez																X		X	X		X		X	X				X	7
Zatox																X	X	X	X		X								5
Coone																	X		X			X		X				X	5
Ran-D																	X			X	X	X			X	X			6
Stana																	X												1
The Pitcher																	X												1
Gunz For Hire																	X		X				X						3
A*S*Y*S																		X											1
Adaro																		X			X							X	3
B-Front																		X				X			X		X	X	5
Frontliner																		X		X									2
ACTI																			X										1
Art of Fighters																			X										1
Code Black																			X										1
Mad Dog																			X									X	2
Max Enforcer																			X										1
Atmozfears																				X	X		X						3
Audiofreq																				X									1
Crypsis																				X									1
Partyraiser																				X									1
The Viper																				X									1
Bass Modulators																					X	X		X					3
Deetox																					X								1
Frequencerz																					X	X	X						3
Tha Playah																					X								1
Tuneboy																						X							1
Audiotricz																						X							1
Blademasterz																						X					X	X	3
Angerfist																						X							1
Phuture Noize																							X	X			X	X	4
Da Tweekaz																							X						1
Sub Zero Project																							X	X		X		X	4
N-Vitral																							X						1
B-Freqz																								X					1
Dr. Peacock																								X				X	2
Sound Rush																								X	X	X			3
Tweekacore																								X					1
D-Sturb																									X	X		X	3
Rejecta																									X				1
Miss K8																									X				1
Radical Redemtion																									X				1
Keltek																									X				1
Act of Rage																										X		X	2
Rebelion																										X		X	2
Rooler																										X			1
Sefa																										X		X	2
The Qreator																										X			1
Deadly Guns																											X		1
Devin Wild																											X		1
Vertile																											X		1
Warface																											X		1
Hard Driver																											X		1

== See also ==
- List of electronic music festivals
