= Trance Generators =

Italian hardstyle team

- Origin: Italy
- Genres: Trance hard trance Hardstyle
- Years active: 1999–2010
- Labels: Future Sound Corporation
- Members: Simone Bergamelli (Ben DJ); Massimo Magri (Radium)
- Past members: Aldo Pesenti; Philippe Martin

Trance Generators was a hardstyle team from Italy, and was originally composed of Philippe Martin, Simone Bergamelli and Aldo Pesenti.

== Career ==
They released their first single (terminal 932) on the Anthem label, in 1999. The following year they started the record company Future Sound Corporation. Aldo Pesenti dropped out in March 2003 and six months later they released the remaining two tracks of the group's debut album, Banging Sounds. Starting from March 2003 the group consists of the Italian duo Massimo Magri and Simone Bergamelli. Banging Sounds Album Vol. 2 was released in mid-2006, showing that the Trance Generators had stuck to the characteristic hardstyle. In March 2010 the Trance Generators ended their activity.
