= Dana van Dreven =

Lady Dana
- Born: Dana van Dreven; 8 July 1974 (age 52); Amsterdam, Netherlands,
- Origin: Netherlands
- Genres: Hardstyle, Hardcore
- Years active: 1993–present
- Label: Danamite
- Website: "Official Facebook"

Dana van Dreven (born 8 July 1974), also known as DJ Lady Dana, is a Dutch hardstyle and previously gabber DJ and producer.

Van Dreven was born in Amsterdam. She started playing gabber in 1993 and though it was never her intention to become a DJ, she did, and is now the most popular female DJ on the Dutch hard dance scene. For a long time, she was the only female DJ at hard dance events. She achieved the highest ranking spot as a hard dance DJ in the British Mixmag top 100, which she first entered at number fifty-five.

She had a hiatus starting in 2010, after a series of medical conditions: she was first diagnosed with burnout after a series of anxiety episodes. After a year of recovery, she was diagnosed with a melanoma and had her lymph glands removed. After the operation, she had pain in her shoulder, as a result of a pinched nerve, and she was diagnosed with nerve damage, causing a constant pulsating pain in her left arm. After two and a half years, she returned to the last Thunderdome festival, where she performed a set using mostly one arm.

== DJ mix albums ==
- 2001 Qlimax (Time To Gain Access To The Future)
- 2001 Dana & The Beholder – Hard Bass
- 2001 Dana & Pavo – Houseqlassics - The Hits
- 2002 Mix 01: ID&T Presents Dana
- 2003 Dana & Pavo – Qlimax
- 2003 X-Qlusive Dana
- 2004 Dj Dana
- 2006 Dana

== Singles ==
- 2003 Dana – Excuse Me / Here We Go!
- 2003 Zenith & Dana – Victims Of Hardstyle
- 2003 DJ Dana & The Prophet – Scratched
