= Technoboy =

Italian hardstyle DJ (born 1970)

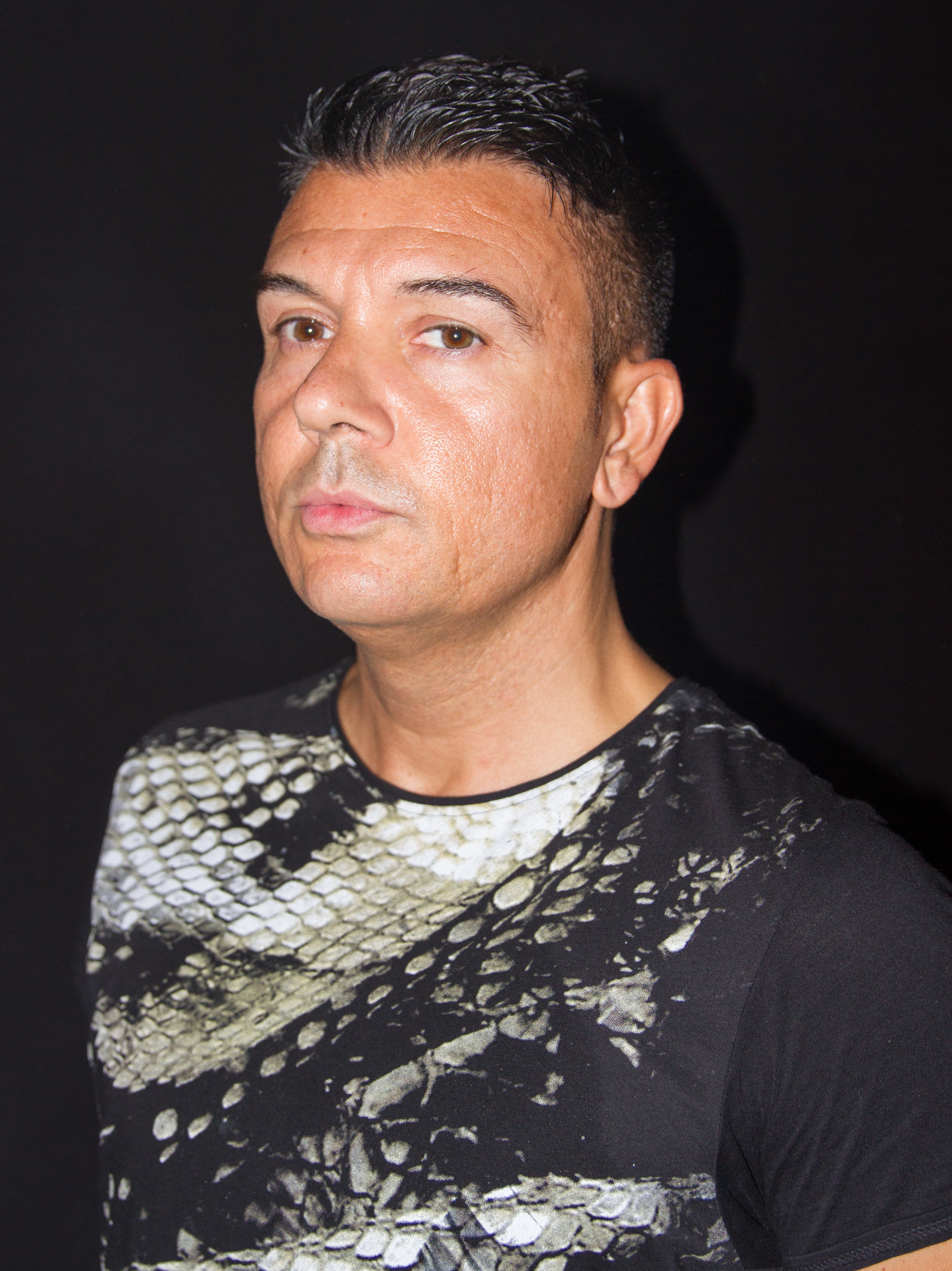
- Technoboy in 2015

Background information
- Born: December 19, 1970 (age 55)
- Origin: Bologna, Italy
- Genres: Hard Dance, Hardstyle, hard trance, Lento Violento
- Years active: 1992 - present
- Labels: Titanic Records
- Member of: TNT

Cristiano Giusberti (born December 19, 1970), known by his primary stage name Technoboy, is an Italian hardstyle DJ and producer from Bologna.

Cristiano is also a manager and producer for 'The Saifam Group', a record company. He began in 1992 as A&R manager at 'RECORD 66 Music Market for DJs', which he still manages today. He then started in 1996 as Producer and A&R at 'Arsenic Sound' until 1998, when he became a producer at ' The Saifam Group' and ever since 1999, he's A&R at the 'Alternative Sound Planet' label.

As an A&R manager, he supervises several well-known labels such as Dance Pollution, Red Alert, Titanic Records, Spectra Records, Green Force Records, BLQ Records, Bonzai Records Italy, Bonzai Trance Progressive Italy, and XTC Italy. He also produced numerous well-known acts such as Nitro, Klone, Pacific Link, The Hose, Spiritual Project, Giada, The KGB's, K-Traxx, Citizen, 2 Best Enemies, Hardstyle Masterz, Hunter, The Raiders, DJ Stardust, Droid, Atlantic Wave, Vector Two, Q-Zar, Ruff, Speedwave, Builder, and Psy man.

== Discography ==
=== Releases ===
As Technoboy (selection):

- Amino-Acid (12") - Titanic Records 1999
- The Future (12") - Titanic Records 2000
- Hardrive (12") - Titanic Records 2002
- Ravers' Rules (12") - Titanic Records 2002
- Tales From A Vinyl (12") - Titanic Records 2003
- War Machine (12") - Titanic Records 2003
- Titanic Remix Collection Volume 2 (12") - Titanic Records 2004
- Atomic (12") - Titanic Records 2005
- Titanic Remix Collection Volume 3 (12") - Titanic Records 2005
- Guns 'N' Noses (12") - Titanic Records 2006
- Into Deep (12") - Titanic Records 2006
- Vita (12") - Titanic Records 2007
- Rage (12") - Titanic Records 2008
- Oh My God (12") - Titanic Records 2008
- Next Dimensional World (12") - Qlimax 2008 Anthem
- Ti Sento (12") - Titanic Records 2009
- Put Some Grace (12") - Titanic Records 2009
- The Undersound (Digital, MP3) - Titanic Records 2009
- Catfight (Digital, MP3) - Titanic Records 2010
- We Need Protection (Digital, MP3) - Titanic Records 2010
- Vanilla Sky (Digital, MP3) - Titanic Records 2011
- Re-Invent Yourself (Digital, MP3) - Titanic Records 2011
- In Ya Face (Digital, MP3) - Titanic Records 2011
- Nothing Nu (Digital, MP3) - Titanic Records 2012

As DJ Gius (selection):

- Overcharge (12") - Titanic Records 1998
- Overcharge (12") - Byte Progressive 1998
- Byte Progressive Attack 2 (12") - Byte Progressive 1999
- Dynamite (12") - Red Alert 2000
- Dynamite (12") - A45 Music 2000
- Amnesia (12") - EDM 2001
- Amnesia (12") - Green Force 2001
- Amnesia (12") - Electropolis 2001
- De-Generation (12") - EDM 2001
- De-Generation (12") - Spectra Records 2001
- De-Generation (12") - Full Access 2001
- Metal (12") - Green Force 2002
- Puffganger (12") - Red Alert 2003
- Definition Of A Track (12") - Dance Pollution 2004
- Mega What (12") - Red Alert 2004
- Jerk It! (12") - Blq Records 2005
- V Like Venusian (12") - Blq Records 2006
- Things To Do (12") - Blq Records 2007
- Nerve (12") - Blq Records 2008

As Aceto (selection):

- Go (12") - Dance Pollution
- Sexy Gate (12") - Houzy Records
- Hard Kick (12") - Dance Pollution 2000
- Ritmo Musicale (12") - Airplay Records 2002

=== DJ-Mix ===
As Technoboy (selection):

- Italian Hardstyle - Atlantis Records 2002
- Italian Hardstyle 2 - Atlantis Records 2002
- Italian Hardstyle 3 - (Doppel-CD) Atlantis Records 2003
- Italian Hardstyle 4 - (Doppel-CD) Atlantis Records 2003
- Italian Hardstyle Part 1 - (Doppel-CD) EMI Music 2003
- Technodome 7 - S.A.I.F.A.M. 2003
- The No. 1 Hardstyle DJ From Italy Vol. 2 - (Doppel-CD) EMI Music 2003
- I'm Hardstyle - (Doppel-CD) Atlantis Records 2004
- Italian Hardstyle 5 - (Doppel-CD) Atlantis Records 2004
- Italian Hardstyle 6 - (Doppel-CD) Atlantis Records 2004
- Technodome 8 - S.A.I.F.A.M. 2004
- Technodome 9 - S.A.I.F.A.M. 2004
- Blutonium Presents Hardstyle Vol. 7 - (Doppel-CD) EMI Music 2005
- Hard Bass Vol. 5 - The Battles - (Doppel-CD) Seismic 2005
- I'm Hardstyle Vol. 2 - (Doppel-CD) Atlantis Records 2005
- Italian Hardstyle 7 - (Doppel-CD) Atlantis Records 2005
- Italian Hardstyle 8 - (Doppel-CD) Atlantis Records 2005
- Italian Hellstars - (Doppel-CD) Atlantis Records 2005
- Technodome 10 - S.A.I.F.A.M. 2005
- Technodome 11 - S.A.I.F.A.M. 2005
- Technodome 12 - The Ultimate Techno Adventure - S.A.I.F.A.M. 2006
- Italian Hardstyle 9 - (Doppel-CD) Atlantis /The Saifam Group 2006
- Italian Hardstyle 10 - (Doppel-CD) Atlantis /The Saifam Group 2006
- Bassdusche Vol.3 (zusammen mit Ziggy X) - (Doppel-CD) Aqualoop Records 2007
- Decibel 2007 - disc 01 Technoboy vs Zatox Seismic records 2007
- The Battle Noisecontrollers vs. Technoboy Digidance 2008
- Qlimax - Next Dimensional World Q-Dance.nl 2008
- Hardbass Chapter 21 Mixed by Various Artists 2011

As Dj Gius (selection):

- Technodome 2 - 2000
- Transgression - 2000
- Technodome 4 - 2001
- Transgression 3 - 2001
- Technodome 5 - 2002
- Technodome 6 - 2002

=== Sampler incl. Remixes ===
As Technoboy (selection):

- Bitte ein Beat! - Beat 3 - EMI 2002
- Harder March 3 - Sony Music 2002
- ID&T Hardhouse - ID&T 2002
- Blutonium Presents Hardstyle Vol. 1 & 2 - EMI 2003
- Blutonium Presents Hardstyle Vol. 3 - Ministry of Sound 2004
- Defqon.1 2004 - Universal 2004
- Oxa Hardstyle Night Vol. 2 - Oxa 2005

As DJ Gius (selection):

- Club Rotation Vol. 8 - Warner 1999
- Atmoz 10 - The Sound Of The Clubs - EMI 2000
- Kernkraft 400 - Diverse 2000
- Trance Files 2000 The Final Yearmixes - ID&T 2000
- Hardstyle European Hard Trance - Capitol Records
