= Driftwood (band) =

Driftwood is an Americana/Folk-Rock band from Binghamton, New York that was formed in 2005. The group consists of Dan Forsyth (guitar, vocals), Joe Kollar (banjo, guitar, percussion, vocals), Claire Byrne (violin, vocals), Joey Arcuri (upright bass, vocals) and Sam Fishman (drums). Their music has been described variously as "fusing traditional Americana and with contemporary influences and timeless subject matter".

== Formation ==
Driftwood was formed by High School friends Dan Forsyth and Joe Kollar in 2006. The original lineup consisted of Forsyth, Kollar, Jon Doll (Bass), Chris Duddy (Mandolin) and Mike Torres (Drums). In 2008, as Duddy and Torres were leaving the band, violinist Claire Byrne was introduced to Forsyth and Kollar. Shortly thereafter, she joined. Original bassist Jonathan Doll left the band in late 2011 and Joey Arcuri joined Driftwood shortly after, completing the current and most definitive lineup.

== Career ==
The band has released five studio albums and two live albums.

Driftwood's debut album, the self-produced "Rally Day", was independently released in 2009. They released their second studio effort, "A Rock & Roll Heart", under the Old Boy Records label in 2011. In late 2013, they released "Driftwood", a fan-funded, self-produced and independently released album. Recorded with Grammy-winning engineer Robby Hunter, the album earned them spots on national radio shows including NPR's Mountain Stage and Music City Roots. The video for "The Sun's Going Down", a single cut from the album, was featured on CMT.com. In 2014, they released their first live album, "Live at Grassroots 2014". It was recorded at the 2014 Finger Lakes GrassRoots Festival of Music and Dance.

== Discography ==
=== Albums ===
- Rally Day Release Date: 2009
- A Rock and Roll Heart Release Date: Nov. 2011 Label: Old Boy Records
- Driftwood Release Date: Dec. 2013
- Live at Grassroots 2014 Release Date: July 2015
- City Lights Release Date: November 4, 2016
- Live at The Purple Fiddle Release Date: Nov. 2018
- Tree of Shade Release Date: 2019
- December Last Call Release Date: March 2024

=== Videos ===
- The Sun's Going Down Release Date: 2014 Director: James Domroe
