= Driftwood (2016 film) =

- Directed by: Paul Taylor
- Written by: Paul Taylor
- Produced by: Alex Megaro
- Starring: Joslyn Jensen; Paul C. Kelly; Michael Fentin
- Release date: January 24, 2016 (Slamdance Film Festival)
- Running time: 76 minutes
- Country: United States
- Language: English

Driftwood is an American independent film written and directed by Paul Taylor. The film had its world premiere at the 2016 Slamdance Film Festival where it was awarded the Grand Jury Prize for best narrative feature.

== Plot ==
The film concerns a young woman who mysteriously washes ashore and is claimed by an older man. While she convalesces at his remote cabin he attempts to domesticate and condition her.

== Cast ==
- Joslyn Jensen as young woman
- Paul C. Kelly as old man
- Michael Fentin as young man

== Production ==
Driftwood was shot in six days and is entirely dialogue-free. Every piece of audio was re-recorded or foleyed in post-production.

== Release ==
Driftwood had its world premiere at the 2016 Slamdance Film Festival and played at various film festivals around the United States including The Columbus International Film + Video Festival, Slamdance Cinemaclub screenings in Los Angeles and Chicago, the Tallgrass Film Festival, the Virginia Film Festival, Cucalorus Film Festival and had its international premiere at the American Film Festival in Wroclaw, Poland.

== Reception ==
Driftwood was awarded the Grand Jury Prize at the 2016 Slamdance Film Festival and has generally received positive reviews from critics. Dennis Harvey of Variety said it was a "beguiling feature directing debut". It has been compared to films made within the Greek Weird Wave movement. It has gone on to receive multiple awards including the Golden Strands Excellence in the Art of Filmmaking award at the 2016 Tallgrass Film Festival and the Programmer's Award at the 2016 Virginia Film Festival.
