= Driftwood (novel) =

2014 novel by Elizabeth Dutton

- First edition
- Author: Elizabeth Dutton
- Language: English
- Publisher: Skyhorse Publishing
- Publication date: 2014
- ISBN: 978-1-62914-499-3 (first edition, hardcover)
- Dewey Decimal: 813.6
- LC Class: PS3604.U7754 D75

Driftwood is a 2014 novel written by Elizabeth Dutton and her debut novel. It was first published through Skyhorse Publishing on November 4, 2014, and centers on Clem Jasper, who goes on a California road trip after her father dies.

== Synopsis ==
The book follows Clem Jasper, a young woman in her late twenties that has become bored with her life in Los Angeles, California. The daughter of a famous rock musician, Clem's life is forever altered when her father dies suddenly, prompting her to take a road trip after finding a series of sealed letters he left behind.

== Reception ==
WKAR-FM wrote a review for Driftwood, praising Dutton's writing and stating that she "has a real skill for creating realistic characters." The School Library Journal and Booklist also reviewed the work, the former of which writing "Nothing terribly startling happens in this debut novel, but Clem is an appealing narrator with a terrific and distinctive voice, and her observations about the various locales in California are snarky and spot-on." The Wall Street Journal was mixed in their opinion, stating that it "is an entertaining, if predictable, look at the absurdities of life on the West Coast".
