= Driftwood Creek =

Stream in North Slope Borough, Alaska, U.S.

Coordinates: 68°51′N 161°07′W

Driftwood Creek is a stream in North Slope Borough, Alaska, in the United States. It is a tributary of the Utukok River.

Driftwood Creek was named for the driftwood collected there by surveyors for their campfires.

== See also ==
- List of rivers of Alaska
