= GelreDome =

Football stadium in Arnhem, Netherlands

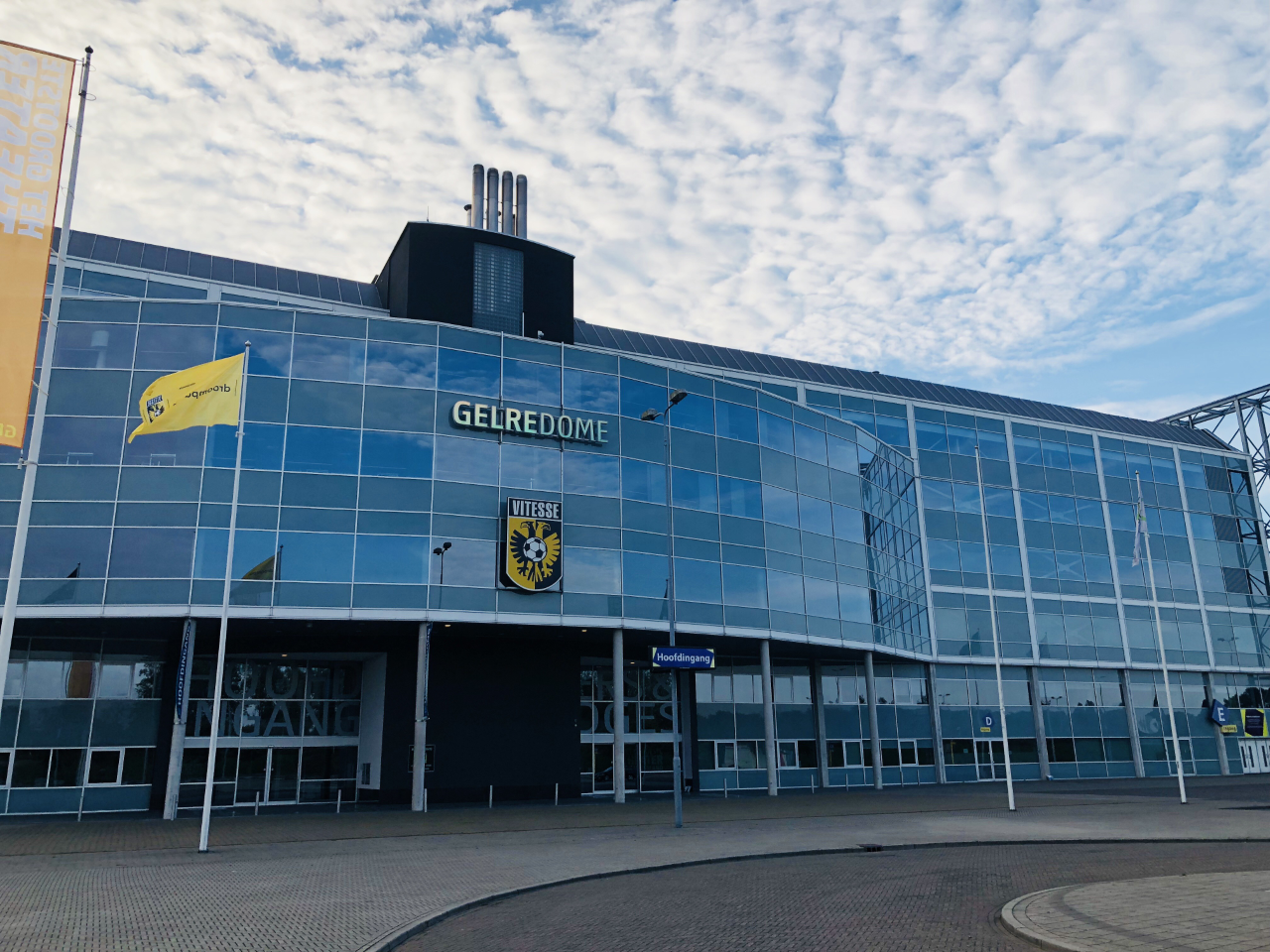
- UEFA
- Interactive map of GelreDome
- Full name: GelreDome
- Location: Arnhem, Netherlands
- Coordinates: 51°57′46″N 5°53′34″E
- Capacity: Football: 21,248 (for home matches of Vitesse); 25,000 (for international matches); 30,000 (during Euro 2000); Concerts: 41,000 (maximum)
- Field size: 105x68 meters

Construction
- Built: 1996–1998
- Opened: 25 March 1998
- Architect: Alynia Architecten Harlingen bv

Tenant
- Vitesse (1998–present)

The GelreDome (Dutch pronunciation: [ˈɣɛlrəˌdoːm]) is a retractable roof and pitch football stadium in the city of Arnhem, Netherlands. Built from 1996 to 1998 at a cost equivalent to €75 million, it opened on 25 March 1998. The stadium has been the home of association football club Vitesse Arnhem since 1998. It was one of the stadiums used during the Euro 2000 tournament held in the Netherlands and Belgium.

Both international and Dutch artists have given concerts in the stadium, including Tiësto, Post Malone, Linkin Park, Lady Gaga, Shakira, Pearl Jam, Bruce Springsteen, Tina Turner, Celine Dion, Madonna, Prince, Bon Jovi, Spice Girls, Justin Bieber, Paul McCartney, Eagles, Iron Maiden, AC/DC, Green Day, André Rieu, The Rolling Stones, Justin Timberlake, Rihanna, Travis Scott, Kanye West, Bad Bunny and many others.

The stadium has a retractable roof, as well as a convertible pitch that can be retracted when unused during concerts or other events held at the stadium, and a climate control system. It has a capacity of 34,000 people for sports events, or 41,000 during concerts. The GelreDome pitch is surrounded on each side by four covered all-seater stands, officially known as the Edward Sturing Stand (North), Charly Bosveld Stand (East), Theo Bos Stand (South) and Just Göbel Stand (West).

The GelreDome currently holds a four-star rating by UEFA.

== History ==
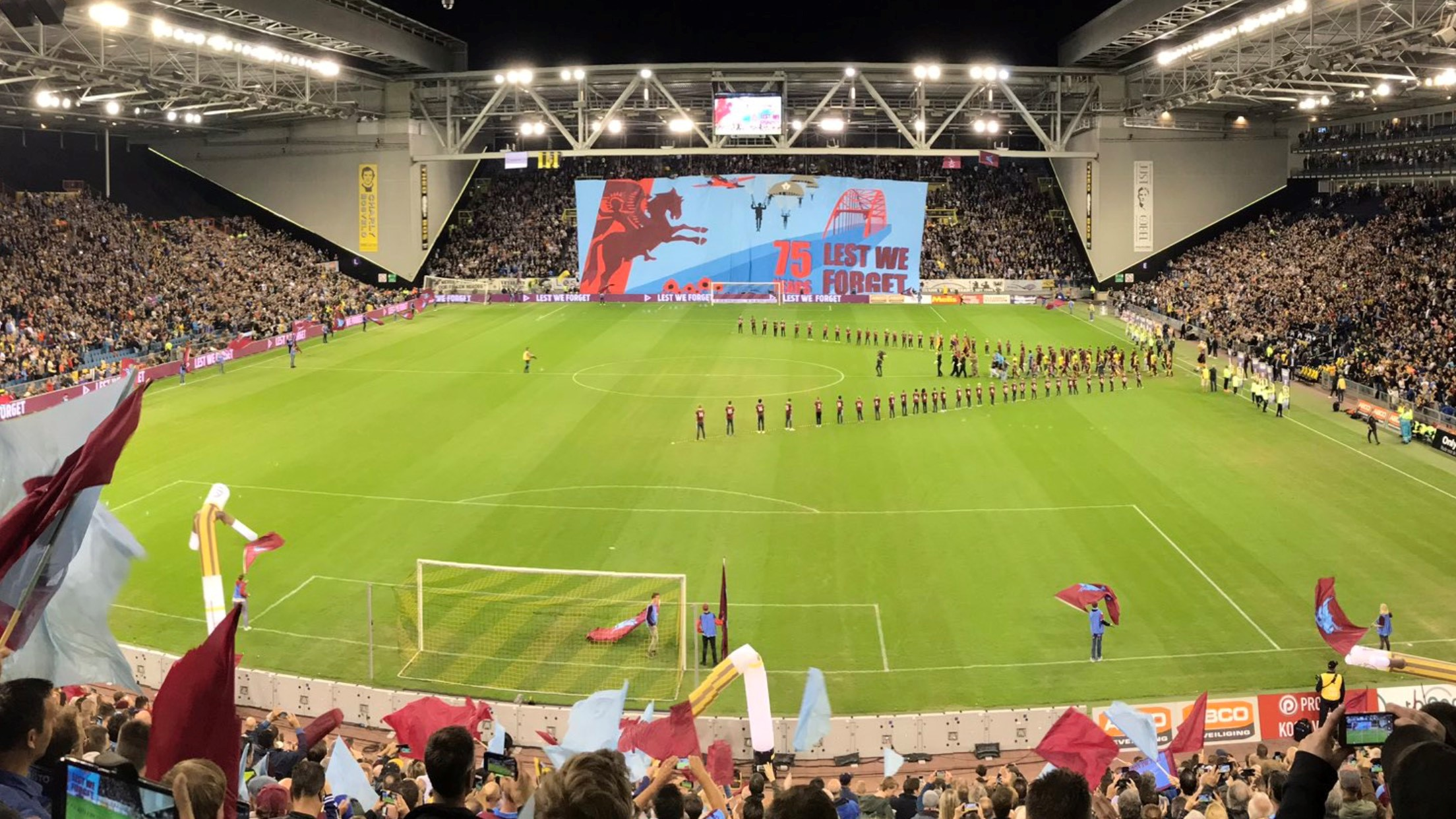
The 'Airborne memorial' football match.

The GelreDome replaced the Nieuw Monnikenhuize Stadion as Vitesse's home ground on 25 March 1998. Plans had been afoot to expand and to renovate the old and now demolished Nieuw Monnikenhuize. However, with a growing fan base and arguments that the old stadium's location was not strategic enough, the idea was conceived to build a new arena for Vitesse fans.

The first match played at the stadium was a 4–1 victory by the home team against NAC Breda in an Eredivisie match. The first goal in the new stadium was scored by Vitesse player Dejan Čurović.

== International matches ==
Three international matches of the Netherlands national football team were played in the stadium, the first one being on May 27, 1998: a friendly against Cameroon (0–1). The last one, played on April 26, 2000, was also a friendly: a 0–0 against Scotland. In 2019, the Netherlands women's national team, also played an international (friendly) match at the stadium. Furthermore, the GelreDome was the location for three UEFA Euro 2000 group stage matches (with a capacity of 30,000), as well as the 2007 UEFA European Under-21 Championship tournament.

=== Euro 2000 matches ===
Date	Time	Stage	Team #1	Res.	Team #2
11 June 2000	2:30pm	Group B	Turkey	1–2	Italy
17 June 2000	6:00pm	Group A	Romania	0–1	Portugal
21 June 2000	6:00pm	Group C	Slovenia	0–0	Norway

=== UEFA U21 2007 matches ===
Date	Time	Stage	Team #1	Res.	Team #2
11 June 2007	6:15pm	Group B	Czech Republic	0–0	England
14 June 2007	8:45pm	Group B	England	2–2	Italy
17 June 2007	8:45pm	Group B	Italy	3–1	Czech Republic
20 June 2007	8:45pm	Semi-finals	Serbia	2–0	Belgium

=== Davis Cup 2003 ===
Date	Stage	Team #1	Res.	Team #2
7 February 2003	First round	Netherlands	2–3	Switzerland

=== Kickboxing ===
Date	Stage	Team #1	Res.	Team #2
21 December 2019	Glory: Collision 2	(Netherlands) Rico Verhoeven	–	(Morocco) Badr Hari

== Concerts ==
Since opening in 1998, GelreDome has hosted hundreds of concerts from Dutch and international superstars, including the Spice Girls, who became the first music act to perform at the stadium, as well as Bruce Springsteen and the E Street Band, Helene Fischer, U2, Backstreet Boys, Janet Jackson, Bon Jovi, Britney Spears, Tiësto, Madonna, Coldplay, Sting, Diana Ross, Tina Turner, Rihanna, Lady Gaga, Shakira, Metallica, Iron Maiden, AC/DC, Justin Bieber, Celine Dion, The Rolling Stones, Imagine Dragons, Eagles Justin Timberlake, Kanye West and Linkin Park’s first stadium concert in the Netherlands. The arena also hosted Qlimax, a Q-dance event from 2003 to 2024.

== Museum ==
The Vitesse Museum is situated within the stadium, showcasing Vitesse's club history.

== Transport ==
The stadium can be reached by a 10-minute bike ride from the Arnhem main railway station. Bus lines 7 and 331, departing from the Arnhem railway station, call at the 'GelreDome-stadion' bus stop, just outside the stadium.

== Gallery ==
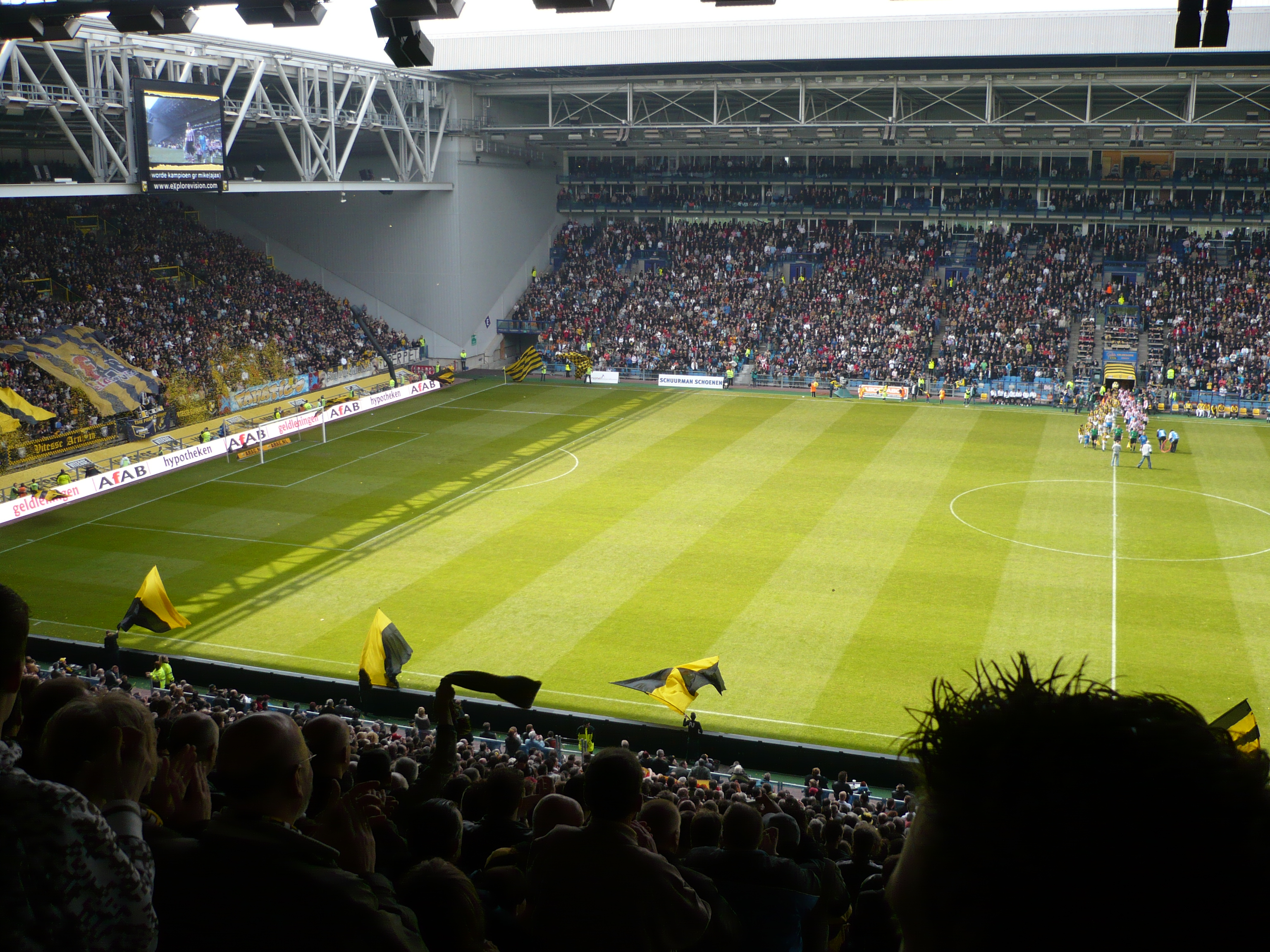

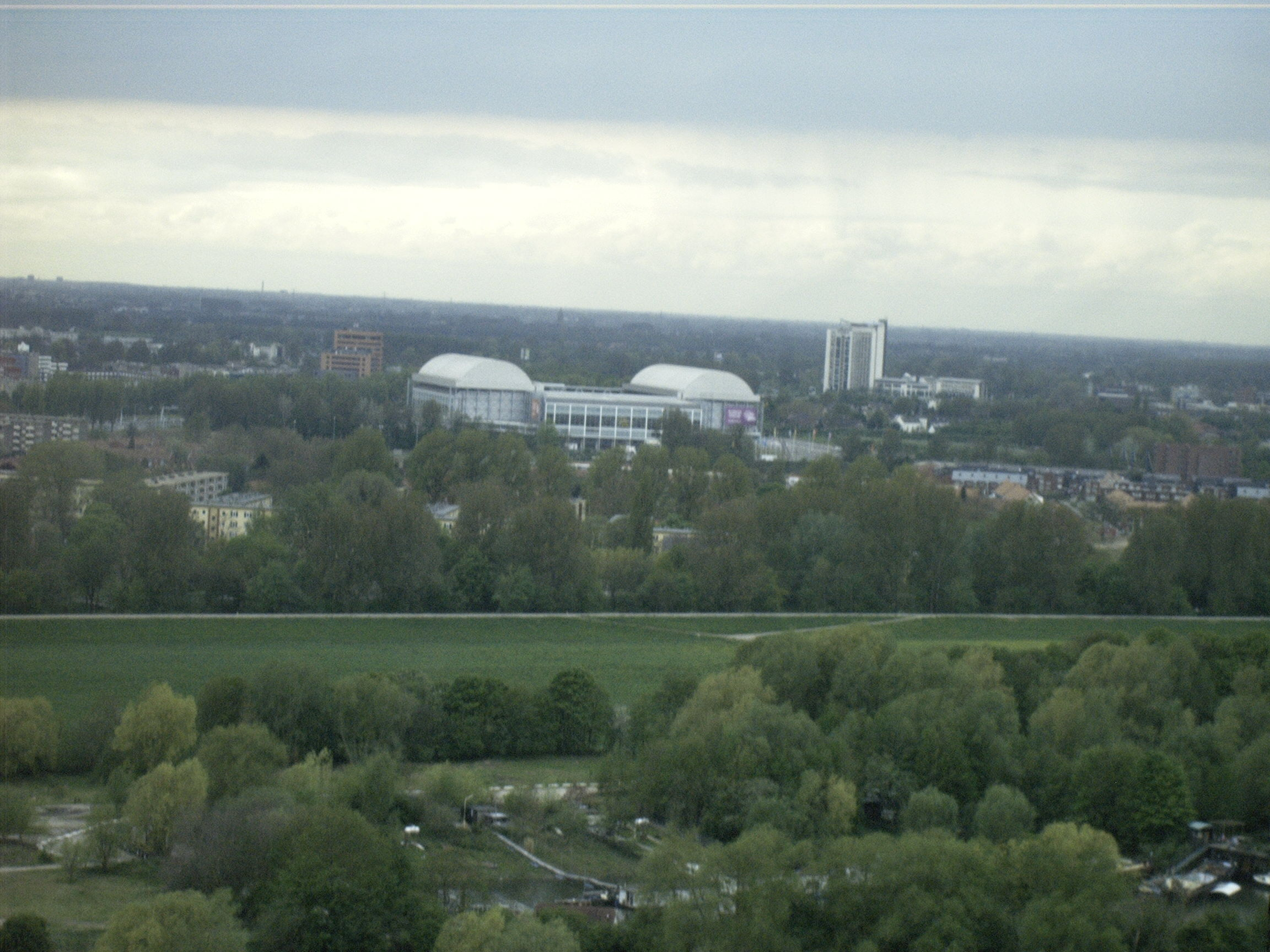

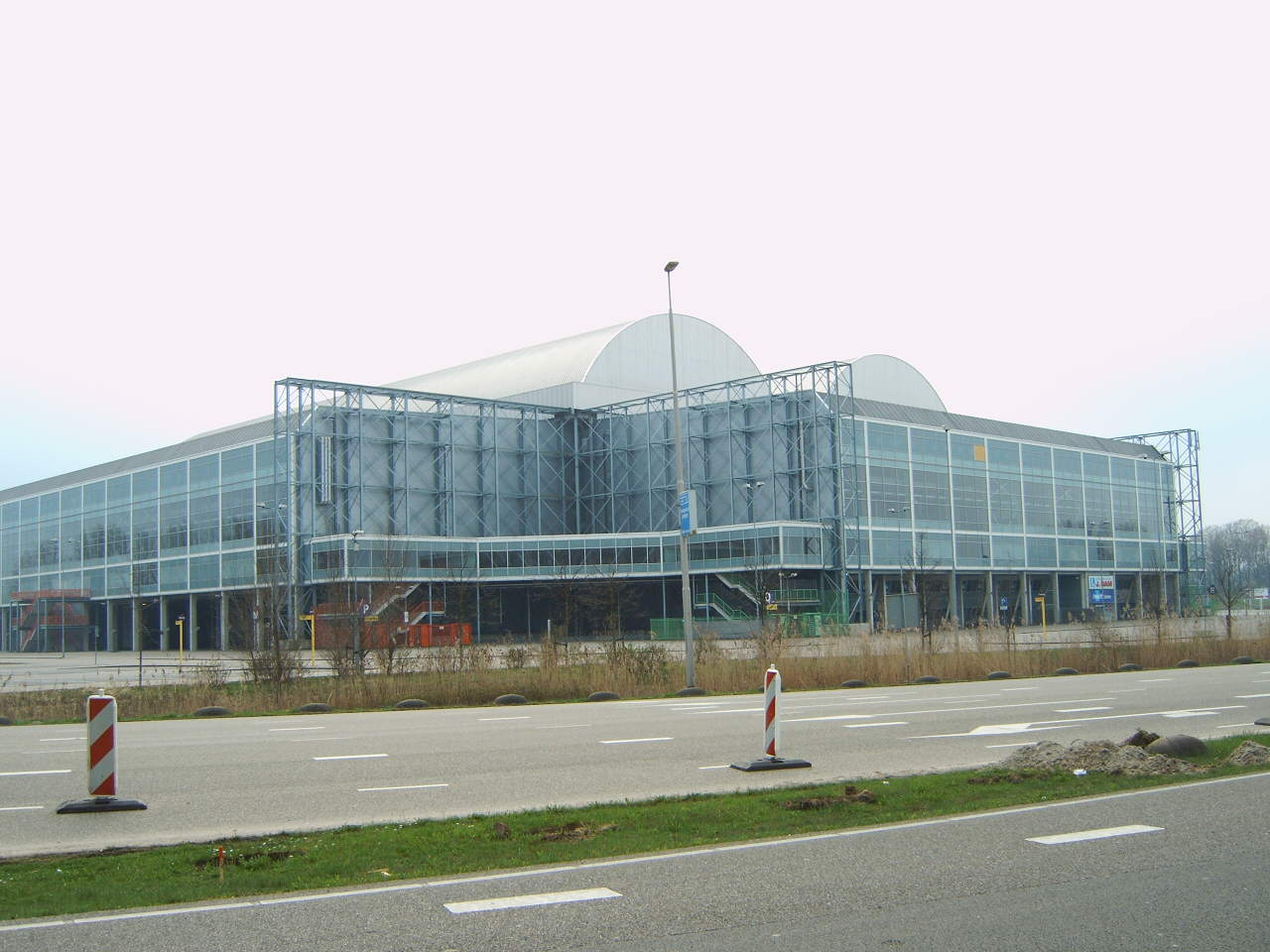

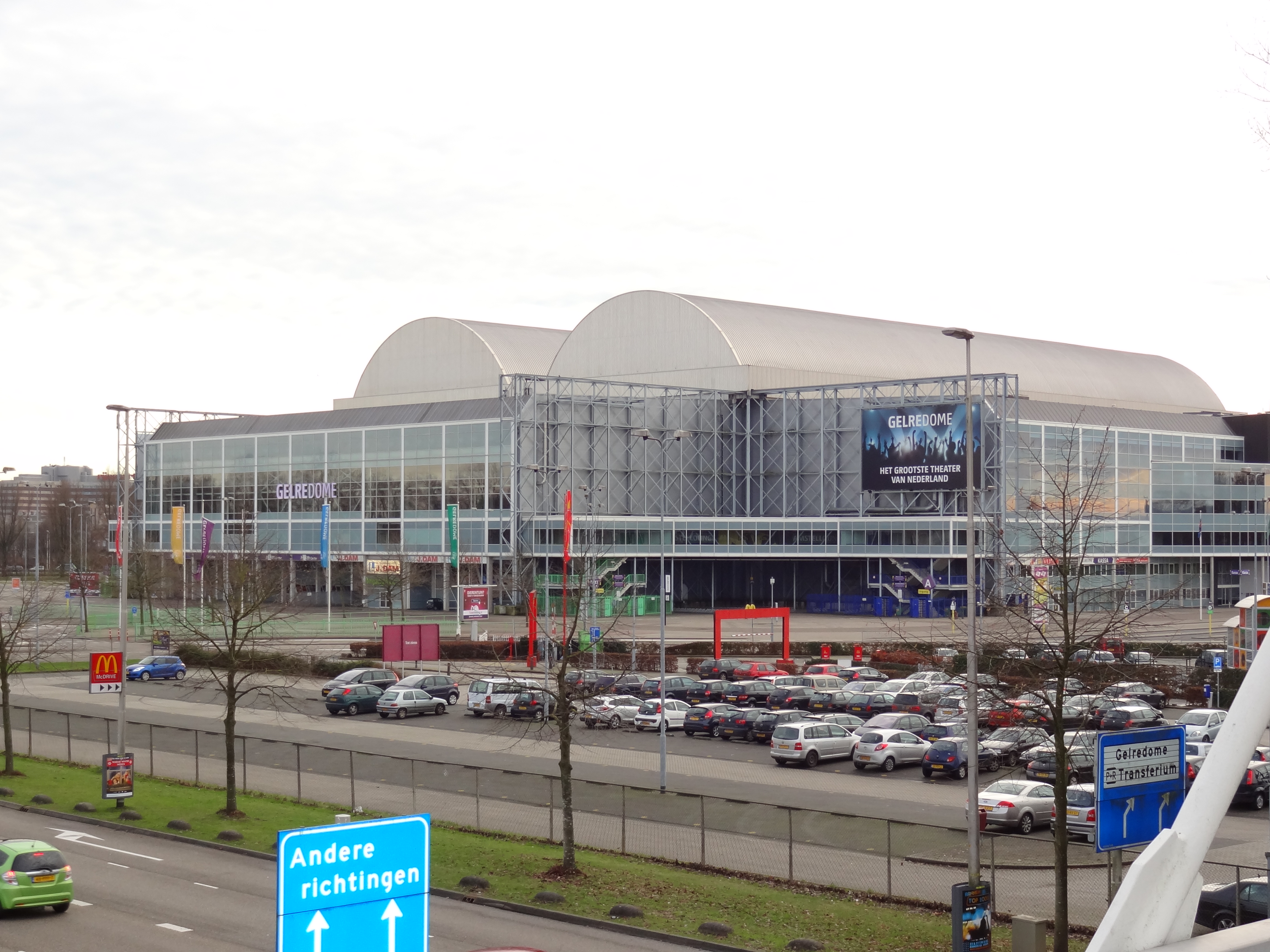

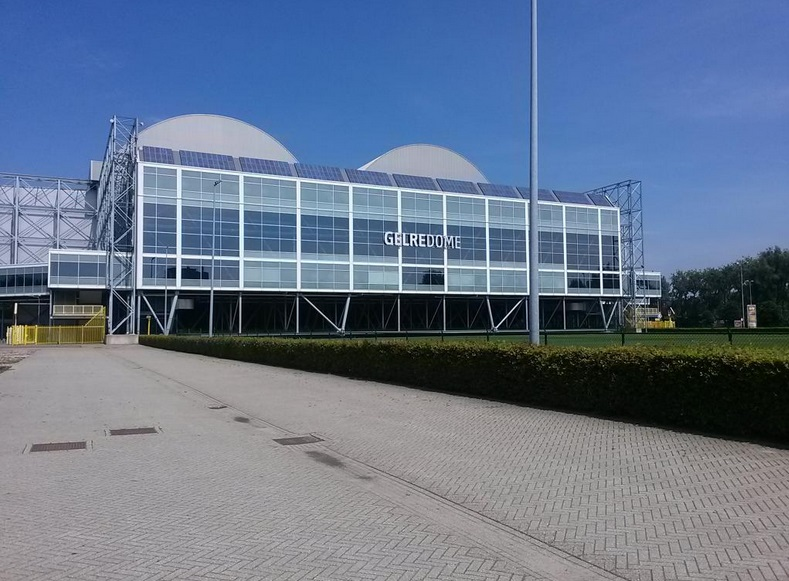

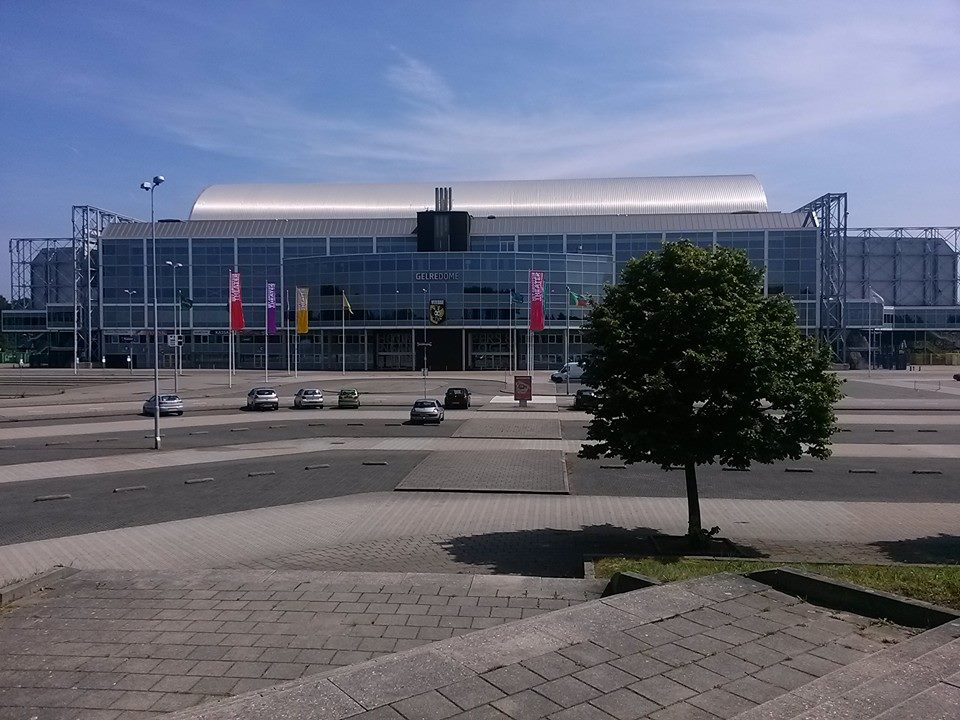

== See also ==
- List of football stadiums in the Netherlands
- Lists of stadiums
