= Q-dance =

Dutch event organization company

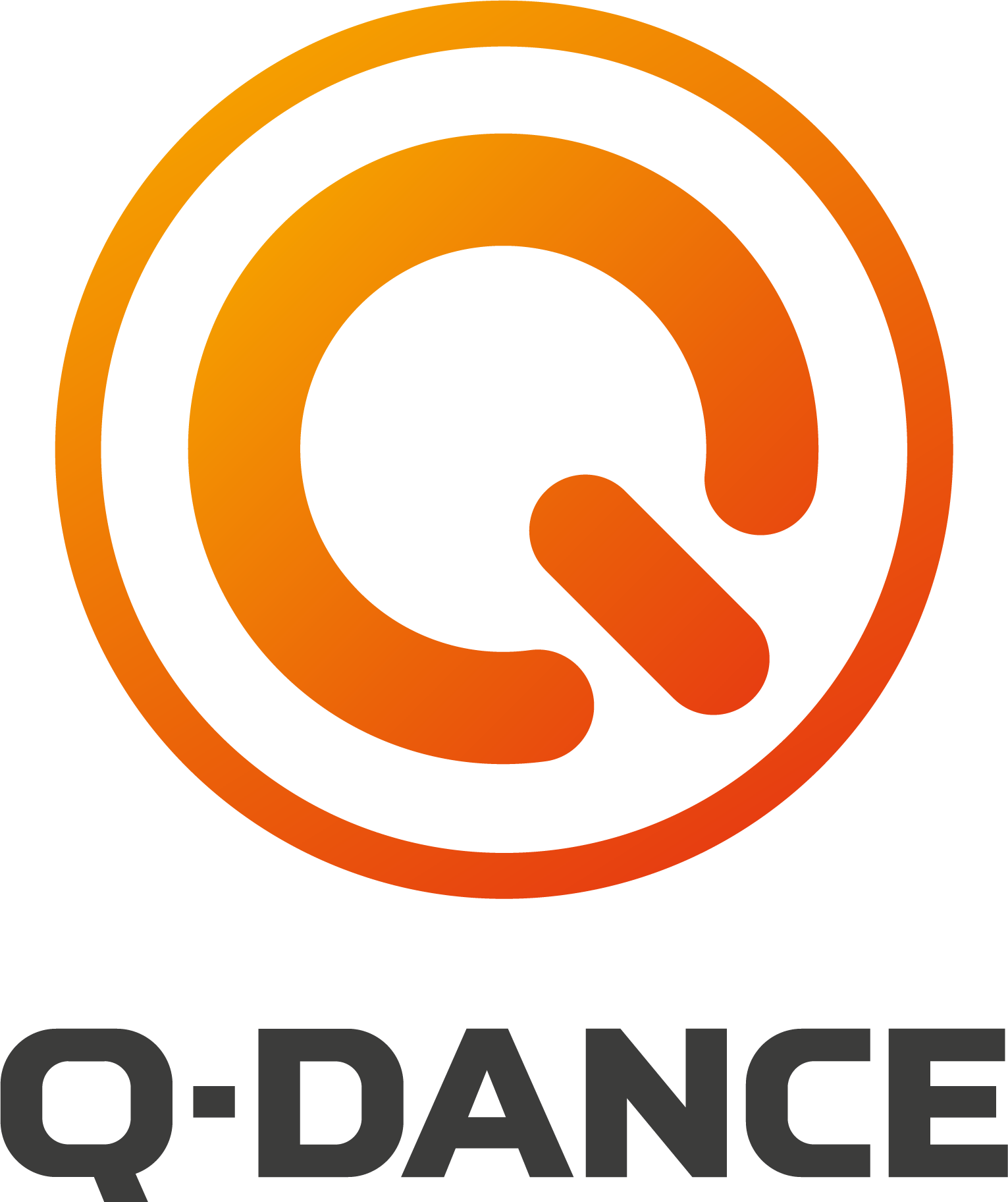

Q-dance is a Dutch company that organizes events and festivals that focuses on the harder styles of dance music – mainly hardstyle, hardcore, and hard trance. Popular events and festivals organized by Q-dance are Defqon.1 Festival, Qlimax and Dominator. Q-Dance has organized multiple events and festivals in the past such as Qapital, The Qontinent, Impaqt, Q-Base, EPIQ, and X-Qlusive. The events of Q-dance are easily identified by the letter “Q” on the event names. The 'Q' in Q-dance stands for quality. The logo of Q-dance is inspired by the knobs on DJ mixers, which if turned 120 degrees to the right creates the letter “Q”.

== History ==
=== Foundation and early years (1999-2003) ===
Q-dance was established in 1999 as Qlass Elite by a group of friends in Landsmeer, a northern suburb of Amsterdam, Netherlands, with Wouter Tavecchio as a key founder. The company’s first event, Houseqlassics, debuted in 2000, focusing on old-school house music and attracting nostalgic dance music fans. After two successful editions of Houseqlassics, Qlass Elite expanded its portfolio in 2000 with two new events: 91-92, celebrating early rave music, and Qlimax, which would later become one of its flagship events. In 2001, the company rebranded as Q-dance and introduced Qlubtempo, a concept centered around innovative and experimental hard dance music.

Q-dance played a pivotal role in the emergence and popularization of hardstyle, a genre blending elements of hard trance, hardcore, and techno. By the early 2000s, hardstyle had gained significant traction, becoming the cornerstone of Q-dance’s events. In 2002, Qlimax relocated to the Thialf Stadium in Heerenveen, Netherlands, marking a step up in scale. The following year, in 2003, the event moved to the GelreDome in Arnhem, solidifying its status as a premier hardstyle event.

In 2003, Q-dance expanded its reach with Q-beach, a temporary beach club on Bloemendaal Beach, Netherlands. The venue hosted weekend parties and talent showcases but ceased operations in 2004. That same year, Q-dance launched three new concepts: Defqon.1 Festival, a large-scale outdoor hardstyle festival; X-Qlusive, a series of events dedicated to specific artists or themes; and Teqnology, a techno-focused concept.

=== Acquisition by ID&t and international expansion (2004-2010) ===
In late 2006, Q-dance was acquired by ID&T, a leading Dutch entertainment company founded in 1992 by Irfan van Ewijk, Duncan Stutterheim, and Theo Lelie. Following the acquisition, Q-dance founder Wouter Tavecchio became CEO of ID&T Group, integrating Q-dance into its portfolio of festivals like Mysteryland and Thunderdome. This merger enhanced Q-dance’s resources and global reach.

Q-dance began its international ventures in 2004 with Q-BASE, held at the abandoned RAF airbase in Weeze, Germany. The event combined hardstyle with other hard dance genres and became a staple in Q-dance’s calendar. In the same year, Q-dance introduced QrimeTime, a gangster- and mafia-themed year-end event in the Netherlands, which ran until 2008.

In 2005, Q-dance entered the Belgian market, securing a permanent stage at Tomorrowland, one of the world’s largest electronic music festivals. This partnership introduced Q-dance’s hardstyle expertise to a broader audience. In 2006, Q-dance organized its first Qlimax event in Hasselt, Belgium, followed by the inaugural Belgian X-Qlusive in 2007. In 2008, Q-dance launched The Qontinent, a Belgium-exclusive festival, managed by its Antwerp office.

Q-dance’s global ambitions continued in 2008 with its first events in Australia. A tour across Sydney, Melbourne, and Brisbane introduced hardstyle to Australian audiences, followed by two X-Qlusive Showtek events in Sydney and Melbourne. In 2008, QrimeTime was replaced by Qountdown, a New Year’s Eve event held at the Heineken Music Hall in Amsterdam, celebrating the transition into the new year with hardstyle.

In 2009, Q-dance brought Defqon.1 Festival to Sydney, Australia, where it sold out in its debut year. The company also expanded its presence through smaller club tours in countries such as Poland, Brazil, Sweden, France, Italy, the United Kingdom, and Northern Ireland, further spreading the Q-dance brand.

In 2010, Q-dance celebrated its 10th anniversary with a grand event at the Amsterdam ArenA. The anniversary featured recycled decorations from past events, including the Ferris wheel from Defqon.1 2008, the “Flower of Life” from Qlimax 2008, and “The Mask” from Qlimax 2006, creating a nostalgic experience for attendees.

=== Growth and diversification (2011-2019) ===
In 2011, Defqon.1 Festival in the Netherlands relocated from Almere Strand to Biddinghuizen, allowing for a multi-day camping experience. The festival introduced pre- and after-parties, enhancing its appeal as a weekend destination. Q-dance continued its international expansion in 2013 with The Sound of Q-dance, a series of standalone events in Santiago, Chile; Los Angeles, USA; and Shenzhen, China, marking its entry into South America, North America, and Asia.

Throughout the 2010s, Q-dance refined its event concepts, emphasizing immersive themes, elaborate stage designs, and high-energy performances. Qlimax and Defqon.1 became synonymous with hardstyle culture, attracting tens of thousands of fans annually. The company also introduced new events, such as Freaqshow (2012–2016), a Halloween-themed hardstyle event, and WOW WOW (2015), a smaller-scale concept focusing on raw hardstyle.

In 2015, Q-dance launched Qapital, a hardstyle event held at the Ziggo Dome in Amsterdam, which quickly became a fan favorite. The company also experimented with hybrid events, such as Q-dance presents: Hardstyle at Tomorrowland, blending its signature sound with the global reach of Tomorrowland.

=== Recent developments ===
In 2020, ID&T Group, Q-dance’s parent company, adopted a one-tier board structure, with Ritty van Straalen succeeding Wouter Tavecchio as CEO. Tavecchio, who founded Q-dance and served as ID&T’s CEO since the 2006 merger, became chairman of ID&T’s board. ID&T co-founder Duncan Stutterheim returned as a non-executive board member, and Jonas Schmidt joined as chief creative officer alongside other management team members. These changes aimed to ensure ID&T’s long-term creativity and growth.

The COVID-19 pandemic disrupted Q-dance’s schedule in 2020 and 2021, leading to cancellations of major events like Defqon.1, Qlimax, and The Qontinent. Q-dance adapted by hosting virtual events, including Q-dance Network livestreams and online festival editions, to maintain community engagement. Defqon.1 2020 was canceled, and a virtual edition was held in 2021, streamed via the Q-dance website.

In 2022, live events resumed, with Defqon.1 returning to Biddinghuizen under the theme “Primal Energy,” originally planned for 2020, and extending to four days. In 2023, Defqon.1 set a record with 250,000 attendees from 110 countries over four days, featuring a 54-meter-high mainstage and enhanced fireworks displays. Dominator also returned in 2022 at the E3 Strand in Eersel, Netherlands, introducing camping and a pre-party.

In 2024, Q-dance underwent significant changes. Qlimax, a cornerstone event, was discontinued after its final edition on November 16, 2024, at the GelreDome. The Qontinent and other events, including stages at Tomorrowland and Mysteryland, were also canceled. Q-dance is focusing exclusively on Defqon.1 and Dominator, its most profitable events, potentially due to financial pressures following the acquisition of its parent company, ID&T, by Superstruct Entertainment during the pandemic. Also in 2024, Superstruct was acquired by Kohlberg Kravis Roberts & Co. (KKR) for approximately €1.3 billion, influencing Q-dance’s strategic direction amid rising costs, including the anticipation of a Dutch VAT increase from 9% to 21% for cultural events, which eventually didn't go through.

In 2025, Q-dance continues to focus solely on Defqon.1 and Dominator.

== Current concepts ==
=== Defqon.1 Festival ===
Defqon.1 Festival is a multiday hard dance event held annually on the festival grounds in Biddinghuizen, Netherlands, located next to Walibi Holland. First organized in 2003 at Almere Beach, it relocated to Biddinghuizen in 2011, where camping facilities were introduced, allowing attendees to stay on-site. The festival, typically taking place in June or July, has grown into one of the Netherlands' most prominent hard dance events, featuring genres like hardstyle, hardcore, and rawstyle. It offers multiple stages with performances by leading DJs, complemented by elaborate stage designs and annual themes. The event draws a large international audience, fostering a strong sense of community among fans.

=== Dominator ===
Dominator
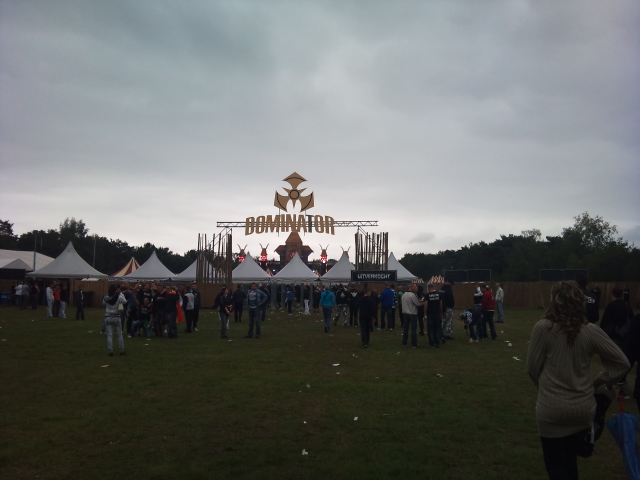
- Genre: Electronic music, hardcore techno
- Locations: E3 Strand Eersel, Netherlands
- Years active: 2005-present
- Founders: Q-dance (and Art of Dance)
- Attendance: >50,000
- Website: DominatorFestival.nl

Dominator Festival, held annually at E3 Strand in Eersel, Netherlands, since 2005, is one of the world’s largest festivals dedicated to hardcore techno, featuring styles such as gabber, industrial hardcore, and terrorcore. The event, which initially drew 20,000 attendees, has grown significantly over the years, establishing itself as a cornerstone of the global hardcore music scene. Organized by Art of Dance and Q-dance, Dominator attracts thousands of fans from around the world with its high-energy performances, elaborate stage designs, and immersive themes that change annually. The festival typically features multiple stages showcasing top hardcore DJs and producers, alongside vibrant visuals and a community-driven atmosphere. Held over one or two days in July, Dominator continues to expand its influence, offering camping options and a diverse lineup that caters to both veteran and new fans of the genre.

=== Q-dance hostings ===
Q-dance, known for its hard dance music concepts, has a significant presence at major events and multiday festivals in the Netherlands and internationally. Since 2003, Q-dance has hosted a dedicated stage at Mysteryland in the Netherlands, and from 2011, it expanded to Mysteryland in Chile. In Belgium, Q-dance has been a fixture at Tomorrowland, curating a stage since the festival’s inaugural edition in 2005. Historically, Q-dance has also organized stages at events such as Electric Love Festival in Austria (starting in 2015), Tomorrowland Brasil, Planet Love in Ireland, Global Gathering in Poland, the Monday Bar Cruise from Sweden to Latvia, Electric Daisy Carnival (EDC) in the USA, and BigCityBeats World Club Dome (WCD) in Germany. As of 2025, Q-dance’s festival presence is limited to hosting a stage at Tomorrowland.

== Previous concepts ==
=== Q-BASE / IMPAQT ===
Introduced in 2004 as "The International Dance Festival," Q-BASE was an annual hard dance event held at a former RAF airbase in Weeze, Germany, near the Dutch border. The festival, which ran for 14 hours from day into night, attracted thousands of partygoers from across Europe, with attendance peaking at around 40,000 in its final years. Featuring genres like hardstyle, hardcore, and uptempo hardcore, Q-BASE was known for its unique setting in old military bunkers and open-air stages, enhanced by elaborate production and annual themes such as “Lost in Dreams” (2010), “Raveolution” (2011), and “The Final Mission” (2018). The event, which also included innovative concepts like the “Drop Your Own Area” contest, concluded its 15-year run on September 8, 2018.

In 2019, Q-BASE was succeeded by IMPAQT – Festival of Titans, held at the same Weeze airbase on September 7, 2019, from 14:00 to 02:00. IMPAQT retained the hardstyle and hardcore focus, introducing a new theme centered around “Titans” with distinct areas for hardstyle, rawstyle, and uptempo hardcore. The festival featured a special “Titan Showcase” for select ticket holders and was designed to continue the high-energy legacy of Q-BASE, though it operated on a shorter schedule. However, due to the COVID-19 pandemic, no further editions of IMPAQT took place after 2019.

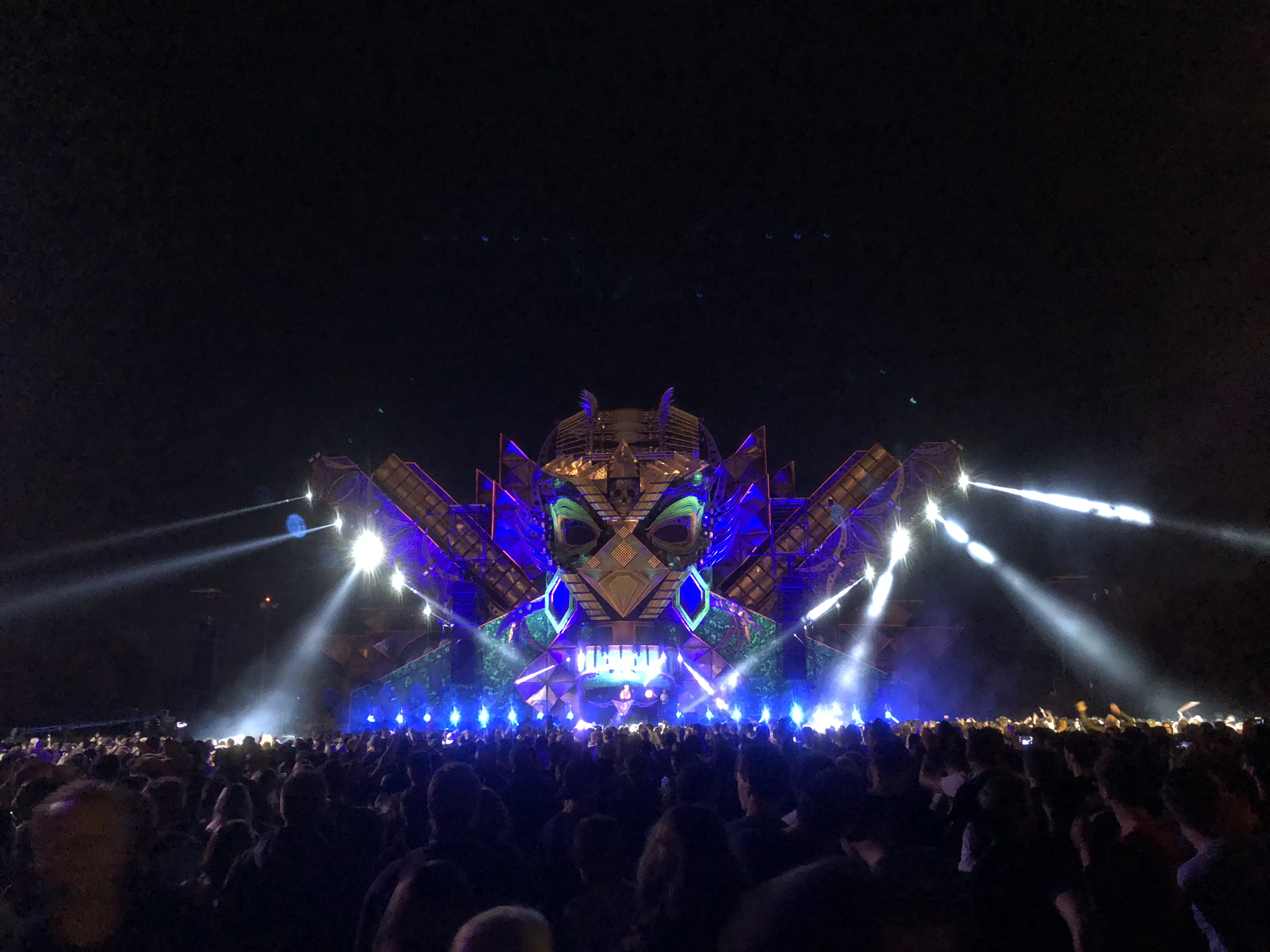
2018

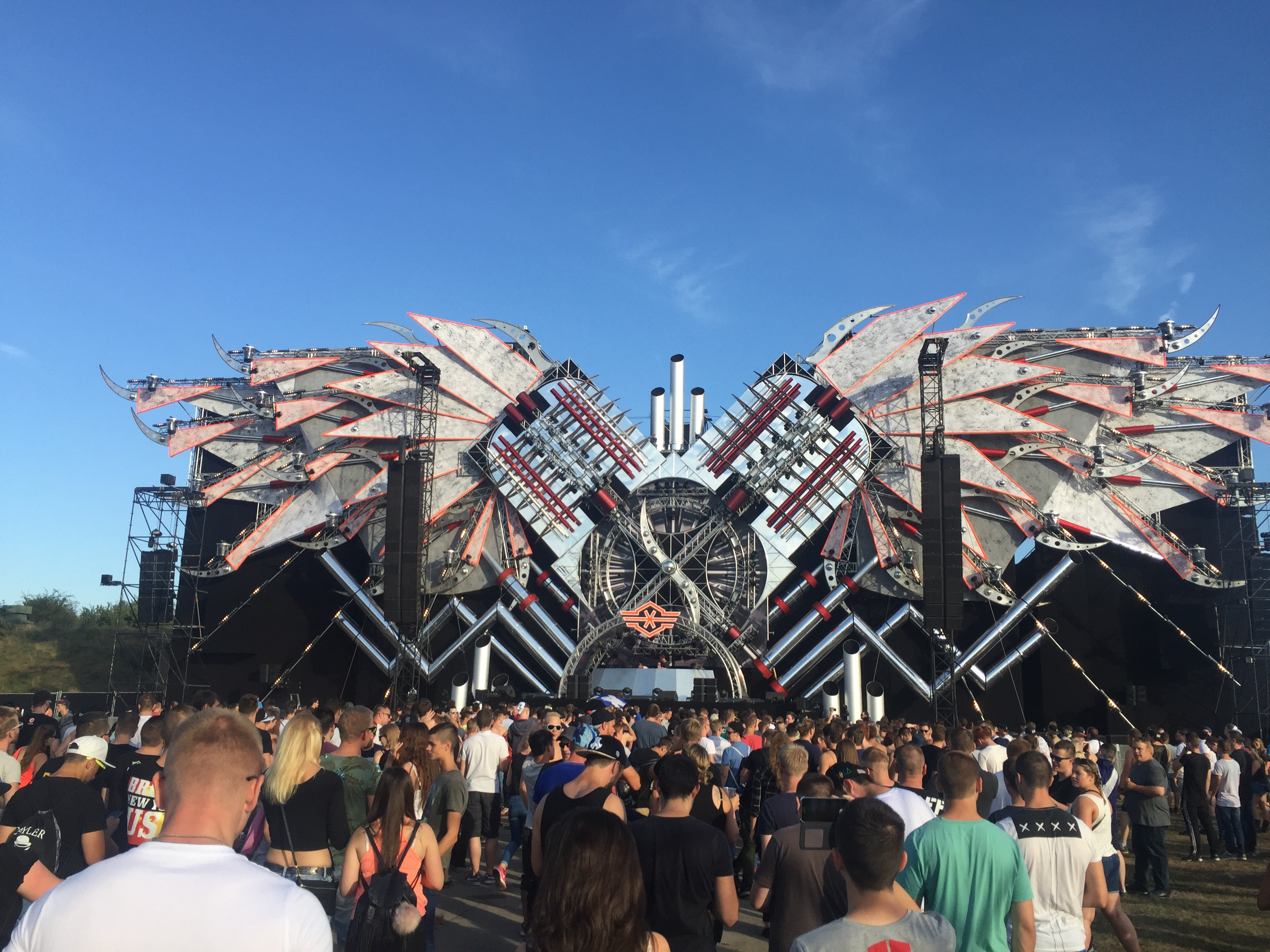
2016

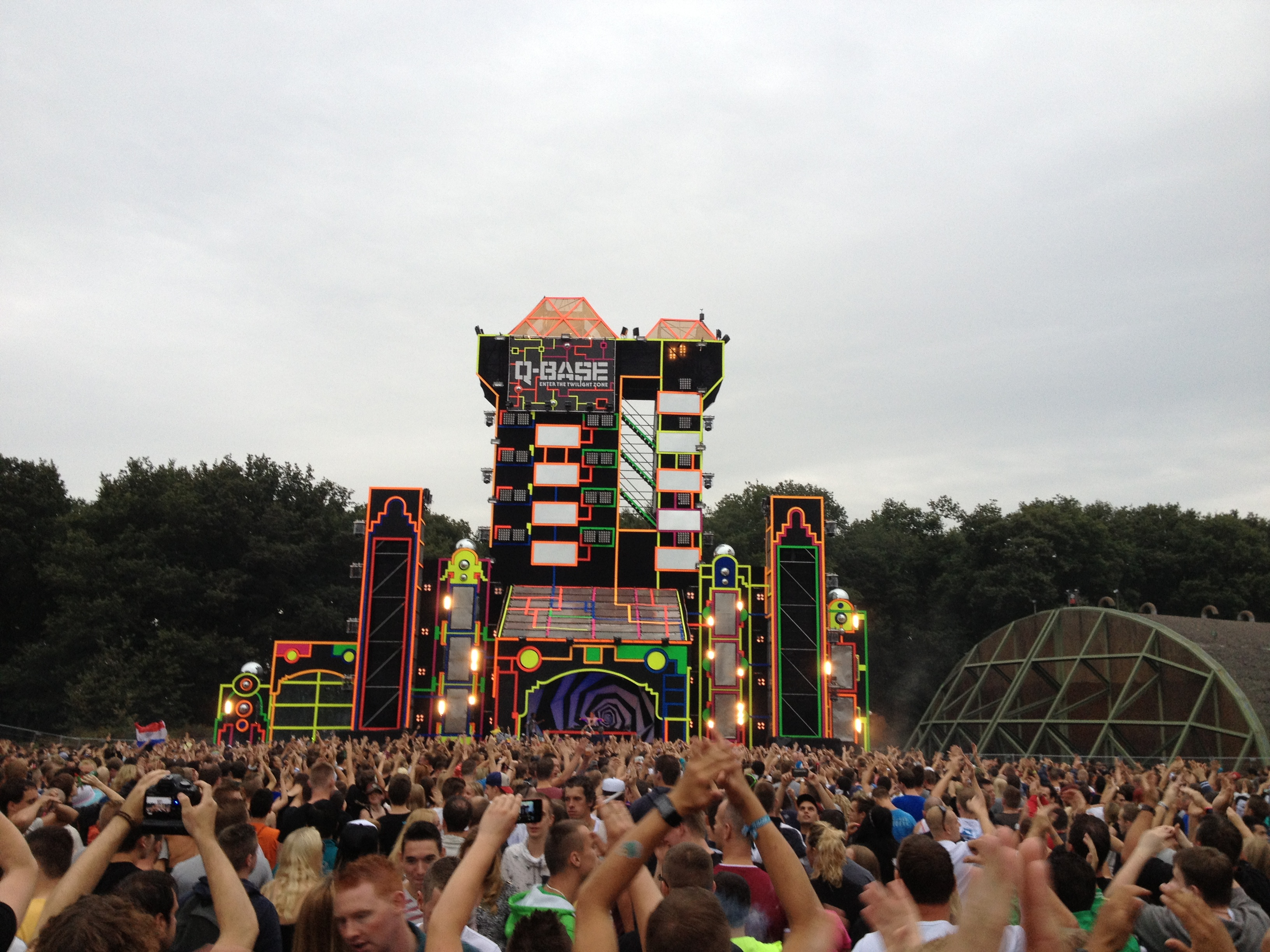
2013

=== Qlimax ===
Qlimax used to be the longest running event of Q-dance for over a decade. In 2000 the first few editions of Qlimax were organized in the Beursgebouw at Eindhoven, the Netherlands.

Since 2003 Qlimax became a yearly returning event at the GelreDome in Arnhem, the Netherlands. The characteristics of a Qlimax event were that the show was organized around a theme, where much attention was given to the show and technology. The predominant music at Qlimax was hardstyle; however, it became tradition to open the show with a jumpstyle, hard trance, or subground act, and end the show with a hardcore act.

On the 25th of July 2024, Q-Dance announced that Qlimax 2024 will be the very last edition. With this announcement, Q-Dance has ended one of the oldest hardstyle events.

=== List of previous concepts ===
Concept	Location	First year	Last year	Number of editions
Hardhouse Explosion	Hemkade 48 Zaandam	2000	2000	1
Fun Festival	Hemkade 48 Zaandam	2000	2000	1
'91-'92	Hemkade 48 Zaandam	2000	2001	5
Club Q-BASE	Hemkade 48 Zaandam	2002	2002	23
Hardcore Resurrection	Various locations	2000	2003	4
Aqtivate	Hemkade 48 Zaandam	2003	2003	1
Qontact	Heineken Music Hall Amsterdam / Beursgebouw Eindhoven	2001	2004	8
Teqnology	Heineken Music Hall Amsterdam	2002	2004	6
Q-Beach	Q-Beach Overveen	2003	2004	8
Beachbop	Q-Beach Overveen	2003	2004	3
Resurreqtion	Heineken Music Hall Amsterdam	2004	2004	1
Seqtion	Hemkade 48 Zaandam	2004	2004	1
History of Hardcore	Heineken Music Hall Amsterdam	2005	2005	1
Inqoming	Outland Rotterdam	2006	2006	1
Kings & Queens	Outland Rotterdam	2006	2006	1
Qlubtempo	Hemkade 48 Zaandam / Heineken Music Hall Amsterdam	2001	2007	31
QrimeTime	Heineken Music Hall Amsterdam	2004	2007	4
The Sound of Q-Dance	Various locations	2009	2009	6
Houseqlassics	Various locations	1999	2010	18
In Qontrol	RAI Amsterdam	2004	2010	7
Qountdown	Heineken Music Hall Amsterdam	2008	2011	4
Q-Dance Presents	Heineken Music Hall Amsterdam	2007	2012	7
QORE 3.0	Heineken Music Hall Amsterdam	2011	2012	2
IQON	Sydney International Dragway	2013	2013	1
QULT	WesterUnie Amsterdam	2012	2015	15
Defqon.1 Festival Chile	Centro de Eventos Munich	2014	2017	3
Freaqshow	Ziggo Dome Amsterdam	2012	2017	6
Q-Base	Airport Weeze	2004	2018	15
Defqon.1 Australia	Sydney International Regatta Centre	2009	2018	10
WOW WOW	Ziggo Dome Amsterdam	2018	2018	1
IMPAQT	Weeze Airport Weeze (GE)	2019	2019	1
EPIQ New Year’s Eve	Ziggo Dome Amsterdam	2019	2019	1
Dediqated - 20 Years of Q-dance	GelreDome Arnhem	2020	2020	1
Qapital	Ziggo Dome Amsterdam	2013	2022	8
X-Qlusive	Heineken Music Hall Amsterdam / GelreDome Arnhem	2002	2024	
The Qontinent	Recreative area Puyenbroeck Wachtebeke (BE)	2008	2024	15
Qlimax	Various locations	2000	2024	27
