= Shocksteady =

Shocksteady is a Dutch trance group, consisting of Thijs Ploegmakers and Dirk Jans, best known for their hit single, "Take a Ride".

In 2002 and 2003, Ploegmakers and Jans produced together, with their friend and fellow producer Ron van Kroonenburg, the tracks "Freeloader" and "Anything Goes" under the project name Driftwood. "Freeloader" became a worldwide club hit and reached mainstream chart success in the UK, Germany, Belgium and The Netherlands. "Freeloader" reached #32 in the UK Singles Chart in February 2003.
