= Hardstyle =

Genre of electronic dance music

- Stylistic origins: Techno; new beat; hard house; hard trance; industrial; mainstream hardcore; trance
- Cultural origins: Late 1990s–early 2000s, Netherlands, Italy, Belgium

Other topics
- Hardcore (electronic dance music genre); dubstep; jumpstyle; electro house; progressive house; Melbshuffle

Hardstyle, is an electronic dance genre that emerged in the late 1990s, with origins in the Netherlands, Belgium and Italy. Hardstyle mixes influences from techno, new beat and hardcore.

Early hardstyle was typically written at 140 BPM (beats per minute); however, modern hardstyle is faster, produced around 150 BPM. It consisted of overdriven and hard-sounding kick drums, often accompanied by an offbeat bass, known as a "reverse bass". As the genre grew, the production techniques and songwriting changed to be suited to a more commercial audience. Modern hardstyle can be recognized by its use of synthesizer melodies and distorted sounds, coupled with hardstyle's signature combination of percussion and bass. The genre is particularly known for its harmonic use of kickdrums. Due to the sustained nature of a hardstyle kick, producers are able to play basslines by using only the kick itself, which becomes a distinct bass tone through a series of distortion, equalization and layering (among other methods). This technique is known as "pitching" a kick.

The genre gained commercial acceptance in the 2010s, with hardstyle artists performing on the biggest stages in EDM worldwide.

Hardstyle influenced other styles of electronic dance music such as big room house, which began sharing similarities with hardstyle like structures, rhythms, and later, pitching kicks became popular in big room too. Hardstyle also played a large influence in frenchcore and happy hardcore music, which both became popular in the late 2010s with the hardstyle audience after producers started applying hardstyle production techniques and melodic styles to the genres.

== History ==
=== Origins ===
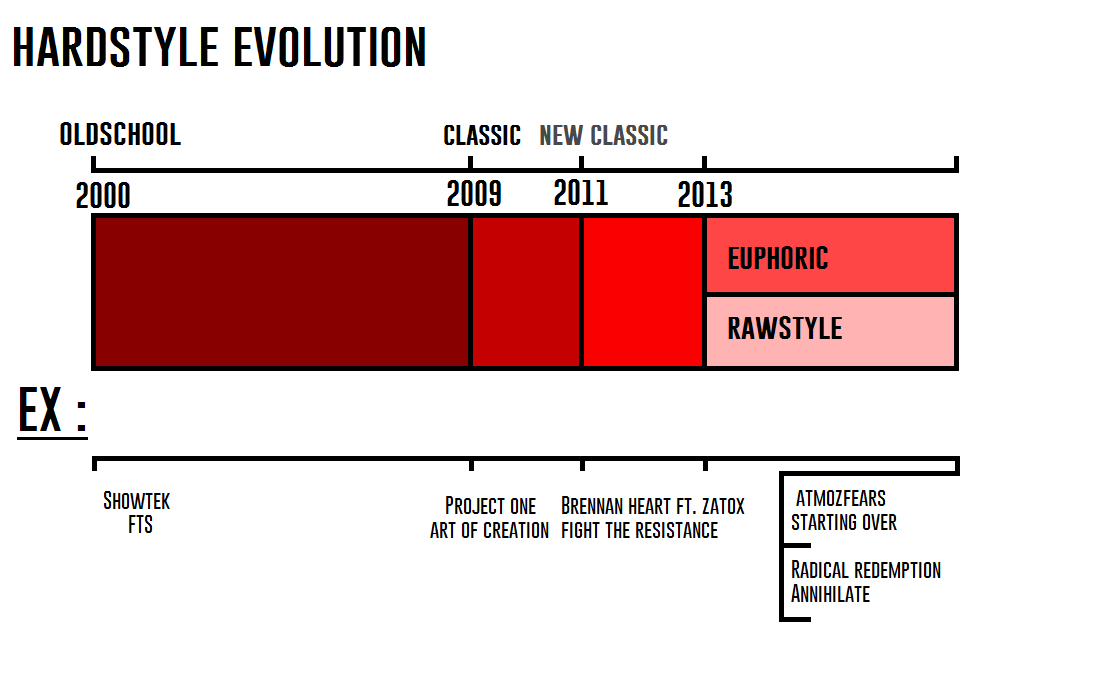
A graphic simpifying the Hardstyle sub-genre evolution

The exact origin of hardstyle cannot be specifically defined; however, it is clear the characteristic of hardstyle originates from hard trance (notably hard trance's 'reverse bass', and artists such as German deejay Scot Project) with influence from other genres such as hardcore, this genre is what is now known as early hardstyle. As it progressed, the genre gathered characteristics from other electronic music genres and refined its own sound and identity. Over time, the BPM of hardstyle music increased, from a range of 135 to 150 to a range of 150 to 160. Some hardcore producers brought hardstyle elements back to the hardcore scene, which made modern hardstyle and hardcore very similar and often indistinguishable in some cases, only differing in BPM.

The first event credited as a hardstyle event was Qlubtempo, which took place in the year 2000 in Zaandam. Qlubtempo was the first event produced by Q-dance, a Dutch event company which would later go on to produce hardstyle festivals in other countries in Europe, Australia, North America, South America and Asia. In 2001, Q-dance produced the first edition of Qlimax. Q-dance trademarked the term "hardstyle" on the 4th of July, 2002, after both Qlimax and Qlubtempo proved to be successful. Since its inception, Q-dance has guided the evolution of hardstyle music with its events and is often involved with hardstyle artists on a creative level. In 2003, Q-dance hosted the first edition of Defqon.1.

The first few years of hardstyle were characterized by a tempo of around 140–150 BPM, a distorted kick drum sound, vocal samples, dissonant synth sounds known as "screeches" and the use of a "reverse bass", a hard kick distorted offbeat bass within the same beat. Around 2002, more hardstyle labels emerged. Fusion Records (with DJ Zany and others) and Scantraxx (founded by Dov Elkabas) were the two largest Dutch Hardstyle labels in that period. At this point in time, hardstyle artists were primarily from either the Netherlands or Italy.

== Subgenres ==
=== Early hardstyle ===
Early hardstyle is a modern name for what was at the time called "hardstyle", the genre is focused mostly on reverse bass kicks, which can still be found in songs today as a pre-drop.

=== Nustyle ===
==== Euphoric hardstyle ====
From roughly 2010 onwards, the move towards a more melodic emphasis from older hardstyle evolved into the subgenre "euphoric hardstyle", characterized by highly emotional melodies and heavy pitch-shifting of kicks.

==== Rawstyle ====
Raw hardstyle, or simply rawstyle, is a subgenre characterized by a darker atmosphere, a lesser focus on melody or a complete lack of it and heavy use of screeches. It takes elements from mainstream hardcore, gabber and early hardstyle. This subgenre was birthed from euphoric hardstyle's boom in popularity around 2010, as many artists and fans wanted darker tracks.

=== Dubstyle ===
In early 2010, a new variation in hardstyle, named dubstyle was introduced. Dubstyle is the name given to the genre fusion of hardstyle and dubstep. Dubstyle tends to have reversed wobble basslines and take the kick styling of hardstyle tracks, while combining them with the rhythm, groove, and dubstep tempo and effects a fusion of elements of hardstyle with a dubstep rhythm, usually a 2-step or a breakstep rhythm. Because of the sporadic beat in dubstyle, the bass is often more dragged out and/or it doesn't follow a strict offbeat pattern that regular hardstyle incorporates, which in turn results in dubstyle basslines bearing similarities to dubstep basslines.

== Notable Events ==
=== Defqon.1 ===
Defqon.1 Festival is the most popular, and longest ongoing hardstyle event, hosted by Q-Dance. Running since 2003, the festival is hosted in Biddinghuizen, Netherlands, across four days (Thursday through Sunday) in late June. Each edition has an anthem produced specifically for the festival, with many claiming it can be one of the highlights of an artist's career. The event features a variety of stages, which host a variety of hardstyle subgenres, with the most popular acts playing on the "RED" mainstage. Other related genres, notably Hardcore (including subgenres), Hard Trance and Hard Techno also feature at the festival. The festival has previously held editions in Australia and Chile, although as of 2026, only the Netherlands edition is active.

=== Qlimax ===
Qlimax long held the title of longest ongoing hardstyle event; an indoor event hosted by Q-Dance from 2000-2024, held mostly at the Gelredome in Arnhem, Netherlands. Qlimax was a single night event, which originally featured trance artists but quickly pivoted to harder styles. It was generally held in November, during the autumn months, where outdoor events are less pleasant due to weather conditions. Some editions were held in different venues and some years held multiple Qlimaxes, but the event was generally annual. The festival was renowned for its mysterious theming and the visual experience it provided guests, alongside playing host to many important moments in the history of hardstyle. Approximately 30,000 visitors attended each edition of the festival. In 2024, Q-Dance announced it would no longer be continuing the festival, citing rising costs and a desire to maintain quality in their festival roster.

=== Festival Season ===
The summer months of Northern Europe are colloquially referred to as "festival season" amongst the Hardstyle community. This kicks off in April, with Rebirth Festival, continues in May, which sees Intents Festival, followed up in June with Defqon.1, and then wrapping up in August with Decibel Outdoor. While events continue outside of this window, this timeframe sees the biggest and most popular outdoor multi-day hardstyle festivals take place. Other popular European electronic dance music festivals, such as Tomorrowland, Electric Love, Parookaville, Creamfields, Mysteryland and Ultra Europe also take place during this calendar window, with some featuring hardstyle artists and even dedicated hardstyle stages.

=== Other Events ===
Notable hardstyle events outside the Netherlands include Belgium's Reverze, Australia's Knockout Outdoor, Germany's Into The Madness, and America's Wasteland. Former events which no longer run but were once considered of importance to the hardstyle community include Sensation Black, The Qontinent, QAPITAL and Shockerz. Other events within the hard dance scene share some similarities in performers, theming and attendees, including hard techno events (such as Verknipt) and hardcore events (such as Thunderdome).

== Notable labels ==
- Dirty Workz
- Fusion Records
- Q-dance
- Scantraxx
