= Headhunterz discography =

This is the discography for Dutch electronic musician Headhunterz. In 2008, along with fellow collaborator Wildstylez, they released their first studio album: Project One - The Album. Since then, he has released 3 solo studio albums:

- Studio Sessions (2010)
- Sacrifice (2012)
- The Return of Headhunterz (2018)

His tracks have won the Q-Dance Hardstyle Top-100 Annual Competition a record 5 times, including 3 consecutive wins from 2022-2024. These tracks are:

- "Destiny": 2017
- "Dragonborn Part III (Oceans Apart)": 2020
- "Before I Wake" (with Vertile): 2022
- "Lost Without You" (with Vertile): 2023
- "Live Forever": 2024

== Releases ==
(White labels are not listed)

| Year | Title |
|---|---|
| 2005 | Breaking The Rules: as Nasty D-Tuners; Release: October 15; Label: Hardcontrol Records; Formats: 12″ |
| 2005 | Check Ya Head: as Nasty D-Tuners; Release: May 17; Label: Hardcontrol Records; Formats: 12″ |
| 2006 | Aiming For Ur Brain: Release: June; Label: Scantraxx Special; Formats: 12″ |
| 2006 | The Sacrifice/D-Tuned: Release: August; Label: Scantraxx Special; Formats: 12″ |
| 2006 | Time 2 Rock / Victim Of My Rage: Release: September; Label: Scantraxx Reloaded; Formats: 12″ |
| 2007 | Scantraxx Rootz / The End Of My Existence: Headhunterz vs. Abject; Release: January 12; Label: Scantraxx Reloaded; Formats: 12″ |
| 2007 | High Rollerz / Scar Ur Face: The Prophet featuring Headhunterz; Release: March 1; Label: Scantraxx Reloaded; Formats: 12″ |
| 2007 | Brennan Heart - Rush The RMX: We Are Possessed (Headhunterz Remix); Release: April 23; Label: M!D!FY; Formats: 12″ |
| 2007 | Rock Civilization: Release: June 18; Label: Scantraxx Reloaded; Formats: 12″ |
| 2007 | Forever Az One / Digiwave: Release: November 9; Label: Scantraxx Reloaded; Formats: 12″ |
| 2007 | The Power Of The Mind: Release: Label: Q-dance; Formats: 12″ |
| 2008 | Various Artists - Qlimax 2007 - The Official Live Registration: Release: January; Label: USM; Formats: CD, DVD-Audio |
| 2008 | Subsonic: Release: February 11; Label: Scantraxx Reloaded; Formats: 12″ |
| 2008 | Call It Music / W.U.W.H.: Tatanka meets Headhunterz / Tatact; Release: February 15; Label: Zanzatraxx; Formats: 12″ |
| 2008 | Blame It On The Music: Headhunterz vs. Wildstylez; Release: March 4; Label: Scantraxx Reloaded; Formats: 12″ |
| 2008 | Last Of The Mohicanz / Reloaded Part 2: Release: April 2; Label: Scantraxx Special; Formats: 12″ |
| 2008 | Various Artists - Kings Of Hard: Tracks 1 to 10 on CD 1 mixed by Headhunterz; Release: May 13; Label: Sonic Solution; Formats: CD, Double album |
| 2008 | Zanza Labs - Biological Chemistry / Zanzarismo: Biological Chemistry (Headhunterz Remix); Release: May 21; Label: Zanzatraxx; Formats: 12″ |
| 2008 | Headhunterz and Wildstylez Present: Project One - The Album: Release: July 3; Label: Cloud 9 Dance; Formats: CD |
| 2008 | Project One - Life Beyond Earth / The Zero Hour: Release: July 22; Label: Scantraxx Reloaded; Formats: 12″ |
| 2008 | Just Say My Name: Release: December 15; Label: Scantraxx Reloaded; Formats: 12″ |
| 2009 | The Fear of Darkness: Release: January 26; Label: Scantraxx Reloaded; Formats: 12", 45 |
| 2009 | Scrap Attack (Defqon.1 Festival Anthem 2009): Release: June 2; Label: Q-dance; Formats: 12″ |
| 2009 | Megasound: Release: July 1; Label: Scantraxx Reloaded; Formats: 12", 45 |
| 2010 | Psychedelic: Release: March 31; Label: Scantraxx Reloaded |
| 2010 | Studio Sessions: Label: Scantraxx Reloaded |
| 2010 | Club Bizarre (Headhunterz and Noisecontrollers Remix): Release: December 22; Label: Scantraxx Reloaded |
| 2010 | Save Your Scrap for Victory (Defqon.1 Festival Australia 2010 Anthem): Label: Q-dance |
| 2011 | From Within / The Message Is Hardstyle: Label: Scantraxx Reloaded |
| 2012 | Dragonborn: Release: January 28; Label: Free Release and Sacrifice |
| 2012 | Sacrifice (EP): Release: March 15; Label: Scantraxx Reloaded |
| 2012 | World of Madness (Defqon.1 Anthem) (Headhunterz, Wildstylez and Noisecontrollers): Release: August 16; Label: Q-dance |
| 2013 | Colors: Release: August 30; Label: Ultra Records |
| 2013 | United Kids of the World: Headhunterz featuring Krewella; Release: November 19; Label: Ultra Records |
| 2014 | Breakout: Headhunterz and Audiofreq; Release: March 1; Label: Ultra Records |
| 2014 | Synergy: Headhunterz and TNT aka Technoboy 'N' Tuneboy; Release: June 27; Label: Q-dance |
| 2014 | Shocker: W&W & Headhunterz; Release: September 8; Label: Armada Music, Ultra Records and Mainstage Music |
| 2014 | Now Is The Time: Headhunterz featuring Miss Palmer; Release: October 13; Label: Hard with Style Records |
| 2014 | We Control the Sound: W&W & Headhunterz; Release: October 24; Label: Ultra Records, Mainstage Music |
| 2015 | Nothing Can Hold Us Down: Hardwell and Headhunterz featuring Haris; Release: January 22; Label: Revealed Recordings |
| 2015 | Once Again: Release: February 16; Label: Revealed Recordings |
| 2015 | Live Your Life: Headhunterz and Crystal Lake featuring Sir Llewy Project; Release: May 25; Label: Doorn Records/Spinnin' Records |
| 2015 | To Be Me (Shilo Edit): Headhunterz featuring Raphaella; Release: July 17; Label: Ultra Records |
| 2015 | The Power Of Now: Steve Aoki and Headhunterz; Release: October 10; Label: Ultra Records |
| 2015 | Won't Stop Rocking: R3HAB and Headhunterz; Release: October 23; Label: Spinnin' Records |
| 2015 | The Universe Is Ours: Headhunterz and Crystal Lake vs Reunify featuring KiFi; Release: December 14; Label: Mainstage Music/Armada |
| 2016 | Feel (The Power Of Now): Steve Aoki and Headhunterz; Release: March 11; Label: Ultra Records |
| 2016 | Live Before We Die: Headhunterz featuring KiFi; Release: March 18; Label: Ultra Records |
| 2016 | Lift Me Up: Headhunterz featuring Mike Taylor; Release: April 8; Label: Ultra Records |
| 2016 | Kundalini: Headhunterz and Skytech; Release: May 9; Label: Spinnin' Records |
| 2016 | Dharma: Headhunterz and KSHMR; Release: June 27; Label: Spinnin Records |
| 2016 | Unique: Headhunterz and Conro featuring Clara Mae; Release: July 29; Label: Ultra Records |
| 2017 | Landslide: Release: February 17; Label: Ultra Records |
| 2017 | Destiny: Release: September 1; Label: Q-dance |
| 2017 | EP 1: Project One; Release: November 10; Label: Q-dance |
| 2018 | The Return of Headhunterz: Release: March 2; Label: Art of Creation |
| 2018 | Leap of Faith: Release: July 12; Label: Art of Creation |
| 2018 | Say My Name: Release: December 4; Label: Art of Creation |
| 2019 | Oxygen: Release: March 14; Label: Art of Creation |
| 2019 | Amen: Headhunterz and Sub Zero Project; Release: May 17; Label: Dirty Workz |
| 2019 | Follow Me: Headhunterz and Sound Rush featuring Eurielle and Ryan Louder; Release: May 31; Label: Art of Creation |
| 2019 | Orange Heart: Headhunterz featuring Sian Evans; Release: July 9; Label: Q-Dance Records |
| 2019 | Home: Headhunterz; Release: September 12; Label: Art of Creation |
| 2020 | The Hunter and the Prey: Headhunterz featuring Sian Evans; Release: July 30; Label: Art of Creation |
| 2020 | Dragonborn Part 3 (Oceans Apart): Headhunterz featuring Sian Evans; Release: October 1; Label: Art of Creation |
| 2020 | Transcendence: Headhunterz and JDX; Release: December 17; Label: Q-Dance |
| 2021 | Defend The Hard: Headhunterz and Sephyx; Release: October 14; Label: Art of Creation |
| 2022 | Time To Dance Again: Headhunterz; Release: July 21; Label: Art of Creation |
| 2022 | Before I Wake: Headhunterz & Vertile; Release: September 15; Label: Art of Creation |
| 2023 | Keepers Of Our Legacy: D-Black & S-Te-Fan & Headhunterz; Release: April 12; Label: Scantraxx Evolutionz |
| 2023 | Reignite (D-Block & S-Te-Fan Remix): Headhunterz feat. Malukah; Release: August 3; Label: Art of Creation |
| 2023 | Lost Without You (Defqon.1 2023 Closing Theme): Headhunterz & Vertile feat. Sian Evans; Release: August 18; Label: Q-Dance |
| 2023 | The Flame Inside: Release: September 15; Label: Art of Creation |
| 2024 | How Far Can You Go: Headhunterz & Final Day; Release: February 9; Label: Art of Creation |
| 2024 | Moonlight: Headhunterz feat. Diandra Faye; Release: May 3; Label: Art of Creation |
| 2024 | Live Forever: Release: November 1; Label: Art of Creation |
| 2025 | The Upside Down: Project One; Release: November 28; Label: Art of Creation |

== Remixes ==
| Title | Year |
|---|---|
| Brennan Heart - We Are Possessed | 2007 |
| Zanza Labs - Biological Chemistry | 2007 |
| Builder - Her Voice | 2009 |
| Project One - Rate Reducer | 2009 |
| Blutonium Boy - Make It Loud | 2010 |
| Brooklyn Bounce - Club Bizarre With Noisecontrollers | 2010 |
| D-Block & S-te-Fan - Music Made Addict With Wildstylez | 2010 |
| Kaskade featuring Neon Trees - Lessons in Love | 2012 |
| Hardwell - Spaceman | 2012 |
| Chuckie and Gregor Salto - What Happens In Vegas | 2012 |
| Nicky Romero - Toulouse | 2012 |
| Zedd - Spectrum | 2012 |
| Zedd - Clarity | 2013 |
| Flosstradamus - Mosh Pit | 2014 |
| Armin van Buuren featuring Mr. Probz - Another You | 2015 |
| Avicii - Waiting for Love With Carnage | 2015 |
| Crystal Lake featuring Kifi - Into The Sunset | 2016 |
| Crystal Lake - Say Goodbye | 2016 |
| Wildstylez - Children Of Drums | 2020 |
| Illenium, Tom DeLonge, Angels & Airwaves - Paper Thin | 2020 |
| Sound Rush, Lxcpr - Take It All | 2021 |
| D-Block & S-te-Fan - Twilight Zone | 2021 |
