= Sub Zero Project =

Dutch music duo

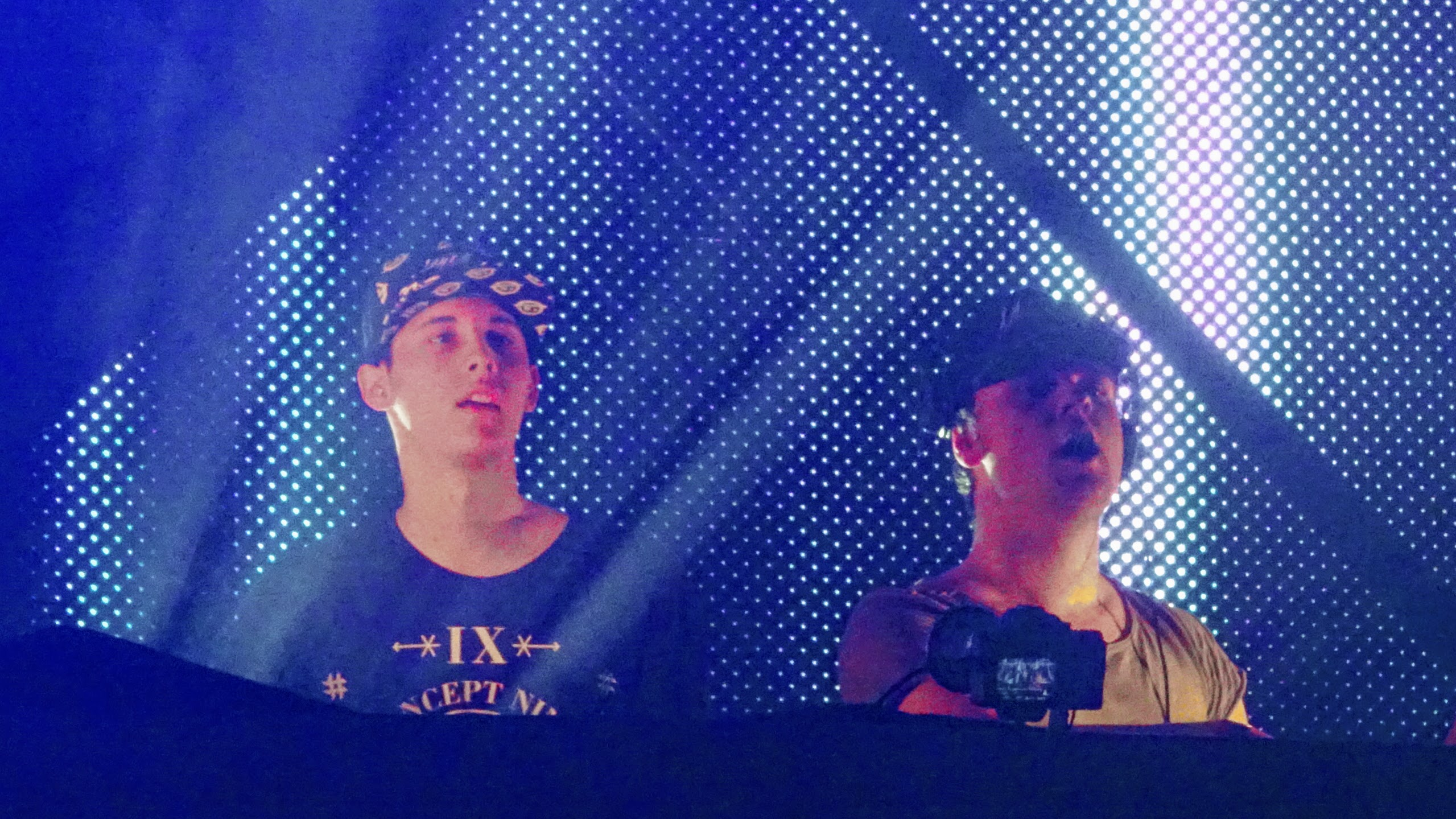
- Sub Zero Project at Defqon.1 2017

Background information
- Also known as: SZP
- Origin: Netherlands
- Genres: Euphoric hardstyle; hardstyle; rawstyle
- Years active: 2013–present
- Labels: Dirty Workz; Scantraxx; WE R Music; Q-Dance Records; Rave Culture; Spinnin' Records; Sinphony; Revealed Recordings; Tomorrowland Music
- Members: Thomas Velderman; Nigel Coppen
- Website: Official website

Sub Zero Project is a Dutch hardstyle producer duo, consisting of Thomas Velderman (born 19 April 1996) and Nigel Coppen (born 9 March 1997). They are known for making hardstyle with their signature "psy-style" kicks, and have been signed to Dirty Workz (or associated sublabels) since 2014.

Sub Zero Project's most popular hits include "Our Church", "Darkest Hour (The Clock)", "Trip To Mars (Astronauts)" and "It Will Be Ok" . They have performed at several popular hardstyle and EDM festivals, including Tomorrowland, Electric Daisy Carnival, Defqon.1 Festival, Ultra Music Festival and Qlimax. Sub Zero Project have many collaborations with other artists, including Timmy Trumpet, Hardwell, Vini Vici, Dimitri Vegas & Like Mike and Headhunterz.

== History ==
=== 2013-2017: Early years ===
Nigel Coppen initially made music under the name Sub Zero. He came into contact with Thomas Velderman via YouTube; they listened to each other's tracks and then decided to work together. Velderman joined Coppen and "Project" was added to the name to clarify that it was a duo. In December 2013, at the ages of 16 and 17 respectively, Nigel and Thomas signed with the Belgian hardstyle record label Dirty Workz.

The pair released their first two official projects with Dirty Workz (under their Anarchy label) in 2014, titled "Scream" and "Let's Fight" respectively. Both EPs contained 3 tracks each.

In 2017 Nigel and Thomas both graduated from the Herman Brood Academy, a production school in Utrecht, as Artist Musician Dance Producers. The same year they released "The Project", which led to them receiving widespread attention for their use of psy-style kicks with aggressive attacks, blended with hardstyle elements. They have since opened up about their interest in psytrance, and have since put out several releases which explicitly reference the psy elements of their music (e.g., Psychopath, LFG Psycho and Sweet But Psycho).

=== 2018-2022: Emerging popularity & albums ===
In 2018 the duo released "The XPRMNT", which as well came with a new live act featuring a change in attire. Q-Dance chose the duo to create the Qlimax 2018 anthem, titled "The Game Changer". In 2019, the duo released "The Contagion", which served as the lead track for their debut album titled Contagion. They described the theme of their debut album: "... we want to infect the world with the Sub Zero Project 'virus’", referring to the title of the album and their explosion of their "viral" popularity in the hardstyle scene.

In 2021, popular releases from Sub Zero Project included "Trip to Mars (Astronauts)" and "HALO", which ranked 1st and 2nd respectively in the Q-Dance annual Top 100 Hardstyle tracks of 2021. They also had two more songs in the Top 10, and became the 2nd artist (after Headhunterz) to win the competition more than once. In July 2022, Sub Zero Project released their 2nd album titled Renaissance of Rave, which included the aforementioned tracks. The cover art pays homage to Leonardo Da Vinci's painting, The Last Supper, to bolster the Renaissance theming. The album's theme was a tribute to the return of full time performances and music festivals in 2022, following a prolonged period of event restrictions in the wake of the COVID-19 pandemic and subsequent lockdowns.

=== 2022-Present: Live acts & solo shows ===
After being invited to create the anthem for Qlimax in 2018, and playing at "The Spotlight" at Defqon in 2022, Q-Dance re-invited the duo to create the anthem for Defqon.1's 2023 edition. "The Path of the Warror", sharing the title with the theme of the edition, was released in February 2023, four months before the festival. In February 2023, they also debuted their latest live act "Psychodelic" at Reverze Festival.

Later in 2023, the duo played their own show for the first time, "All For One". The show included elements of some of their previous live acts: Contagion, Rave Into Space, Renaissance of Rave, and Psychodelic. They also included a performance of their most recent live act: Bad Trip. Following the success of their first solo show, which sold 7500 tickets, they announced a follow-up event for 2024, titled "All In One". "All In One" brought together all of their previous live acts, including The Project, The XPRMNT, the acts from "All For One" the year prior, and Robot Ravolution - their most recent act.

"Our World" was announced in 2025, with the duo taking their newest combination live-act on tour towards the end of 2025 and into 2026. Their latest act has four distinct themes instead of one, and was first played at the end of October 2025.

== Notable collaborations ==
=== Timmy Trumpet ===
Australian House DJ Timmy Trumpet has maintained his support of the hardstyle genre, incorporating harder sounds into his sets and collaborating frequently with hardstyle artists. He has collaborated with Sub Zero Project on five separate occasions since 2018, with the following tracks:

- 2018: Rockstar (feat. DV8) - Released on Spinnin' Records
- 2020: Project X - Released on Timmy Trumpet's SINPHONY Records
- 2022: Soft Ass Shit - Part of Sub Zero Project's 2022 Album Renaissance of Rave
- 2023: The Race (with Vini Vici) - Released on Tomorrowland Music
- 2025: Move Your Body (with Dimitri Vegas & Like Mike) - Released on Dimitri Vegas & Like Mike's Smash The House

=== D-Block & S-Te-Fan: "Darkest Hour (The Clock)", "Change To Follow" & 4444OFAKIND ===
Sub Zero Project and longstanding hardstyle duo D-Block and S-Te-Fan (performing as their darker themed act "Ghost Stories") released their first collaboration "Darkest Hour (The Clock)" in March 2019. The song enjoyed much popularity amongst the hardstyle community, being voted the winner of the Q-Dance annual Top 100 Hardstyle tracks at the end of the year. "Darkest Hour (The Clock)" also ended up placing #12 in Q-Dance's Dediqated 2020 event - where fans and attendees voted for the top hardstyle tracks of all time.

At the final edition of Qlimax in late 2024, Sub Zero Project and D-Block & S-Te-Fan both played sets, recognising both acts' contributions to hardstyle music and the history of the festival. At the end of Sub Zero Project's set, they were joined by D-Block & S-Te-Fan to premiere "Change to Follow". "Change to Follow" was released in March of the following year, under the latter duo's Scantraxx record label.

In 2026, a collaborative project with D-Block & S-Te-Fan titled 4444OFAKIND was announced. 4444OFAKIND debuted at Reverze Festival in February, and are booked to play at many festivals, including Defqon.1 and Parookaville. They have released no new music at the time of writing, although several original tracks have been heard in their sets to date.

=== Hardwell: "Judgement Day" & "Brace For Impact" ===
In April 2023, the duo collaborated with EDM producer Hardwell, producing "Judgement Day". The song was the final song in a 6-song promotional series by Hardwell in early 2023. Two years later, Sub Zero Project would reconnect with Hardwell to produce "Brace For Impact", with vocals from prominent crunk artist Lil Jon. The song was first played as the closing track for Hardwell's Ultra Miami's 2025 Saturday closing set, before being released in October of the same year.

=== Dual Damage: "It Will Be Ok" ===
Sub Zero Project collaborated with compatriot hardstyle duo Dual Damage, releasing "It Will Be Ok" in April 2025. The song was released to much fanfare at the time, containing a signature "kickroll" which Sub Zero Project described as "multiple fast kicks, put into one beat like a drum roll". Prior to the tracks release, Dual Damage had been popularising the "kickroll" as a concept, and both duos had been teasing this collaboration in their sets since the end of 2024. Critics describe the combination of the kickroll and melody as "seamlessly blended", and the song was well received by hardstyle fans - even prior to its official release. "It Will Be Ok" went on to win the 2025 Q-Dance annual Top-100 Hardstyle voting competition, ending a three year winning streak from former collaborator Headhunterz via his Project One act, who had to settle for second place. It was Sub Zero Project's third time winning the award.

=== 4444 of a Kind ===
In 2026, Sub Zero Project and D-Block & S-te-Fan introduced a new collaborative act known as 4444 of a Kind; building upon past collaborations between the duos, the act was designed as an experiment in "pushing the boundaries of hard dance and playing with different genres, without limiting ourselves to one specific sound". The act made its live debut at Reverze in January 2026, and its first single "Waiting 4" was released in June 2026. Later in the year, 4444 performed on the Freedom stage at the first weekend of Tomorrowland 2026. In November 2026, 4444 of a Kind released "RE4SON", in collaboration with Hardwell.

== Mainstream popularity ==
In recent years, Sub Zero Project have started enjoying more popularity from mainstream EDM crowds, touring in countries and cities where hardstyle has not historically been popular. They have been booked at broader appeal EDM events rather than purely hardstyle festivals (including EDC Las Vegas, Electric Love and Amsterdam Music Fesitval). In 2025, they followed Dirty Workz founder Coone and label-mates Da Tweekaz and Mandy to become the fourth hardstyle act to play on the Tomorrowland mainstage.

Unlike most other hardstyle producers, Sub Zero Project have collaborated with mainstream EDM artists such as Hardwell, Timmy Trumpet, W&W, Dimitri Vegas & Like Mike and Vini Vici, as well as the longstanding MC of Tomorrowland; MC Stretch. Hardstyle has long been perceived as "too intense" for casual listeners, but Sub Zero Project's successes has shown there is an appetite for harder forms of EDM in the mainstream. In an interview with EDM Nomad in 2025, they talked openly about how they were catering their sets to accommodate for new audiences:

"...the kind of music we produce and play is well-received by mainstream listeners. In fact, we’ve noticed that hard dance is becoming more and more mainstream. It’s also all about how you present the music. When we play for a new crowd, we definitely take that into consideration when preparing our set."

— Sub Zero Project, EDM Nomad Interview, October 2025

Sub Zero Project has made the DJ Mag Top 100 list – 95th in 2019, and subsequent finishes outside the top 100 in later years. With mainstream interest in hardstyle re-emerging, and following their Tomorrowland Mainstage performance, the duo returned to the Top 100 list - placing 64th in 2025.

== Discography ==
Track/Album name	Artists	Label	Year	Note
Scream EP	Sub Zero Project	Anarchy	2014	Dirty Workz's sublabel
Let's Fight EP	Sub Zero Project	Anarchy	2014	Dirty Workz’s sublabel
"Madman"	Sub Zero Project and Atmozfears	A² Records	2015	
"Funky S**t"	Sub Zero Project	Anarchy	2015	Dirty Workz’s sublabel
"Hell On Earth"	Sub Zero Project and X-Pander	A² Records	2015	
"Hit the Funk"	Sub Zero Project	Anarchy	2015	Dirty Workz's sublabel
"This Is Madness"	Sub Zero Project and Atmozfears	Anarchy	2015	Dirty Workz’s sublabel
"Get Your Hands Up"	Sub Zero Project	Anarchy	2015	Dirty Workz’s sublabel
"Headbanger"	Sub Zero Project and Sub Sonik	Anarchy	2016	Dirty Workz’s sublabel
"Raise Your Fist"	Sub Zero Project and Sub Sonik	WE R Raw	2016	WE R's sublabel
"Let the Pistol Go"	Sub Zero Project	Anarchy	2016	Dirty Workz’s sublabel
"Meltdown"	Sub Zero Project and Devin Wild	Scantraxx	2016	
"DRKNSS"	Sub Zero Project and Da Tweekaz	Dirty Workz	2017	
"The Project"	Sub Zero Project	Dirty Workz	2017	
"Basstrain"	Sub Zero Project and GLDY LX	Dirty Workz	2017	
"DSTNY"	Sub Zero Project and Devin Wild	Scantraxx	2017	
"Stand Strong (Q-Base 2017 Hangar OST)"	Sub Zero Project and Meccah Dawn	Q-Dance Records	2017	
"Wake Up"	Sub Zero Project, Zatox and Nikkita	Dirty Workz	2017	
"Playing with Fire"	Sub Zero Project	Dirty Workz	2017	
DJ Isaac – "Burn" (Sub Zero Project Remix)	Sub Zero Project	Dirty Workz	2017	
"Unity"	Sub Zero Project and LXCPR	Dirty Workz	2018	
"Our Church"	Sub Zero Project and Headhunterz	Art of Creation	2018	Released on Headhunterz's album The Return of Headhunterz
Headhunterz – "Doomed" (Sub Zero Project Remix)	Sub Zero Project	Art of Creation	2018	
"March of the Rebels"	Sub Zero Project and MC Diesel	Dirty Workz	2018	
"The XPRMNT"	Sub Zero Project	Dirty Workz	2018	
"We Are the Fallen"	Sub Zero Project and Phuture Noize	Dirty Workz	2018	
Yoji Biomehanika – Hardstyle Disco (Sub Zero Project Remix)	Da Tweekaz and Sub Zero Project	Dirty Workz	2018	
"Rockstar"	Sub Zero Project, Timmy Trumpet and DV8	Spinnin' Records	2018	
"The Game Changer (Qlimax 2018 Anthem)"	Sub Zero Project	Q-Dance Records	2018	
"Tombs of Immortality"	Sub Zero Project and Ecstatic	Dirty Workz	2019	
"Heroes of the Night" (Intents Festival 2019 Anthem)	Sub Zero Project and D-Sturb	Dirty Workz	2019	
"Darkest Hour (The Clock)"	Sub Zero Project and D-Block & S-te-Fan	Dirty Workz	2019	
Contagion	Sub Zero Project	Dirty Workz	2019	
"The Contagion"	Sub Zero Project and Christina Novelli	Dirty Workz	2019	
"Patient Zero"	Sub Zero Project	Dirty Workz	2019	
"Amen"	Sub Zero Project and Headhunterz	Dirty Workz	2019	
"Break the Game"	Sub Zero Project and KELTEK	Dirty Workz	2019	
"The Solution"	Sub Zero Project and Villain	Dirty Workz	2019	
"The Source"	Sub Zero Project and Frequencerz	Dirty Workz	2019	
"All Night"	Sub Zero Project and Bryant Powell	Dirty Workz	2019	
"Call of the Sacred"	Sub Zero Project and Phuture Noize	Dirty Workz	2019	
"Be My Guide"	Sub Zero Project	Dirty Workz	2019	
"All for One"	Sub Zero Project	Dirty Workz	2019	Released as a free download
"PSYchopath"	Sub Zero Project	Dirty Workz	2019	
"Face of a Champion"	Sub Zero Project and Coone	Dirty Workz	2019	
"Rave Into Space"	Sub Zero Project	Dirty Workz	2020	
"The Remedy"	Sub Zero Project	Dirty Workz	2020	
"The Silence (Of My Sins)"	Sub Zero Project	Dirty Workz	2020	
"Project X"	Timmy Trumpet and Sub Zero Project	Sinphony Records	2020	Spinnin' Records' sublabel
"Time Machine"	Sub Zero Project and MC Stretch	Dirty Workz	2020	
"Enter the Realm"	Sub Zero Project	Q-Dance Records	2020	
"Obey No More"	Sub Zero Project and Warface	Dirty Workz	2021	
"Halo"	Sub Zero Project	Dirty Workz	2021	
"A New Beginning"	Sub Zero Project	Dirty Workz	2021	
"Sinners Paradise"	Sub Zero Project and Rebelion	Rave Culture	2021	
"Base"	Sub Zero Project and E-Life	Dirty Workz	2021	
"Fight As One"	Sub Zero Project and Dimatik	Sinphony Records	2021	Spinnin' Records' sublabel
"Trip To Mars (Astronauts)"	Sub Zero Project	Dirty Workz	2021	
"Rave Culture 2022"	Sub Zero Project	Rave Culture	2021	
"Fly With Me"	Sub Zero Project	Dirty Workz	2022	
"Lions"	Sub Zero Project	Dirty Workz	2022	
Renaissance Of Rave	Sub Zero Project	Dirty Workz	2022	
"Nightmare Nirvana"	Sub Zero Project and Diandra Faye	Dirty Workz	2022	
"One Last Time"	Sub Zero Project and Ran-D	Dirty Workz	2022	
"Mind Of A Warrior"	Sub Zero Project and Coone ft. ATILAX	Dirty Workz	2022	
"Soft Ass Shit"	Sub Zero Project and Timmy Trumpet	Dirty Workz	2022	
"Live Fast Die Young"	Sub Zero Project and Rebelion	Dirty Workz	2022	
"Paradise"	Sub Zero Project and W&W	Rave Culture	2022	
"Conquer Your Mind (Apex OST 2023)"	Sub Zero Project	Dirty Workz	2023	
"Path Of The Warrior (Defqon.1 2023 Anthem)"	Sub Zero Project	Q-dance Records	2023	
"Illusions"	Sub Zero Project	Dirty Workz	2023	
"Judgement Day"	Sub Zero Project and Hardwell	Revealed Recordings	2023	
"LFG PSYCHO"	Sub Zero Project and MC Stretch	Dirty Workz	2023	
"The Race"	Sub Zero Project and Timmy Trumpet and Vini Vici	Tomorrowland Music	2023	
"Lose My Mind (Sub Zero Project Remix)"	Brennan Heart, Wildstylez and Sub Zero Project	I AM HARDSTYLE	2023	
"We Ignite"	Sub Zero Project and Vertile	Dirty Workz	2023	
"Legends"	Showtek, Sub Zero Project and Doktor	Q-Dance Records	2023	
"Refuse To Speak"	Sub Zero Project and Bryant Powell	Dirty Workz	2024	
"Maze of Memories (Reverze Anthem 2024)"	Sub Zero Project and Diandre Faye	Dirty Workz	2024	
"TECHNOBOTS"	Sub Zero Project	Dirty Workz	2024	
"Liberation"	Sub Zero Project and Hard Driver	Dirty Workz	2024	
"The Showdown"	Sub Zero Project, JDX and Wildstylez	Defqon.1 Records	2024	
"LASER"	Sub Zero Project	Dirty Workz	2024	
"Sweet But Psycho"	Sub Zero Project	DWX Covers	2024	
"INVINCIBLE"	Sub Zero Project	Dirty Workz	2024	
"Save Me"	Sub Zero Project and Rebelion	Acid Reign	2024	
"Robot Ravolution"	Sub Zero Project and Drean	Dirty Workz	2024	
"It Will Be OK"	Sub Zero Project and Dual Damage	Dirty Workz	2025	
"Never Surrender"	Sub Zero Project	Dirty Workz	2025	
"Capital of Crazy" (Intents Festival 2025 Anthem)	Sub Zero Project and Rebelion	Intents Records	2025	
"Brace for Impact"	Hardwell and Sub Zero Project	Revealed Recordings	2025	
"Change to Follow"	Sub Zero Project and D-Block & S-Te-Fan	Scantraxx	2025	
"Won't Let Me Down"	Sub Zero Project and Teddy Bee	Tomorrowland Music	2025	
"Move Your Body"	Dimitri Vegas & Like Mike, Timmy Trumpet and Sub Zero Project	Smash The House	2025	
"Never Coming Down"	Sub Zero Project	Dirty Workz	2026	
"Are U Me"	Sub Zero Project	Dirty Workz	2026	
"Our World"	Sub Zero Project	Dirty Workz	2026	
