= Illuminize =

Background information
- Also known as: Illuminize
- Born: Omar Martinez; November 3, 1998 (age 28)
- Origin: Athens, Georgia, United States
- Genres: Hardstyle; electronic music
- Occupations: DJ; record producer; remixer
- Instruments: Synthesizer; drum machine; music sequencer; personal computer
- Years active: 2015–present
- Labels: Scantraxx; X-Bone
- Website: www.illuminize.us

Omar Martinez (born November 3, 1998), more commonly known by his stage name Illuminize, is an American music producer of Peruvian descent. The first release from Illuminize was a single titled Reality, which was introduced under Scantraxx's X-Bone label. Reality was Martinezs debut on Spotify and secured him a spot on Hardstyle.coms Top 100 list. Following this was his Scantraxx Debut titled Radiate. Shortly after, Illuminize released his third track titled Leave a Light with Nino Lucarelli.

== Career ==
Martinez started producing at the age of 15, and started Illuminize in 2017. In 2018 Illuminize released his first track, Reality, on X-Bone, which is a sub label under the larger and more well known Scantraxx Recordz. This release piqued the interest of hard dance fans. In July 2019 Illuminize released a track featuring Nashville based vocalist Weldon titled Radiate, shortly after in December 2019, Martinez released his third single featuring widely known vocalist Nino Lucarelli titled Leave a Light.

== Discography ==
=== Singles ===
- "Reality" (2018)
- "Radiate" with Weldon (2019)
- "Leave a Light" with Nino Lucarelli (2019)

=== Mixes ===
- "The Hard City Episode #18 Feat. Illuminize"
