= Defqon.1 =

Annual music festival in the Netherlands

Coordinates: 52°26′23″N 5°46′06″E

Defqon.1 Weekend Festival
- Genre: hardstyle, hardcore, Rawstyle, Uptempo, Frenchcore and Electronic Dance music, hard dance
- Dates: Netherlands (since 14 June 2003); Australia (19 September 2009-September 16, 2018); Chile (12 December 2015 & 10 December 2016)
- Locations: Netherlands (since 14 June 2003); Australia (19 September 2009- 16 September 2018); Chile (12 December 2015 & 10 December 2016)
- Years active: 2003–present (Netherlands); 2009–2018 (Australia); 2015–2016 (Chile)
- Founders: Q-dance
- Attendance: 300,000 (2024)
- Website: Defqon.1 Weekend Festival

Defqon.1 Weekend Festival is an annual music festival held in the Netherlands. In the past, it was also held in Chile and Australia. Founded in 2003 by festival organizer Q-dance, the festival plays mostly hardstyle and related genres such as rawstyle, hardcore, uptempo, early and euphoric hardstyle. Over the years, Defqon.1 has grown into the largest harddance festival in the world, attracting over 250.000 visitors from over 100 countries.

== History ==
The festival was previously held in mid-June on Almeerderstrand in Almere. Since 2011, it has moved to the event site next to Walibi Holland in Biddinghuizen, and typically takes place in late June. Q-Dance currently has a contact with Walibi to host the festival on its grounds until 2032. In 2012, the festival was extended to three days, and a decade later, in 2022, following two years without a festival, the event returned with a four day schedule. In its current four day format, more than 300 artists play across the festival grounds.

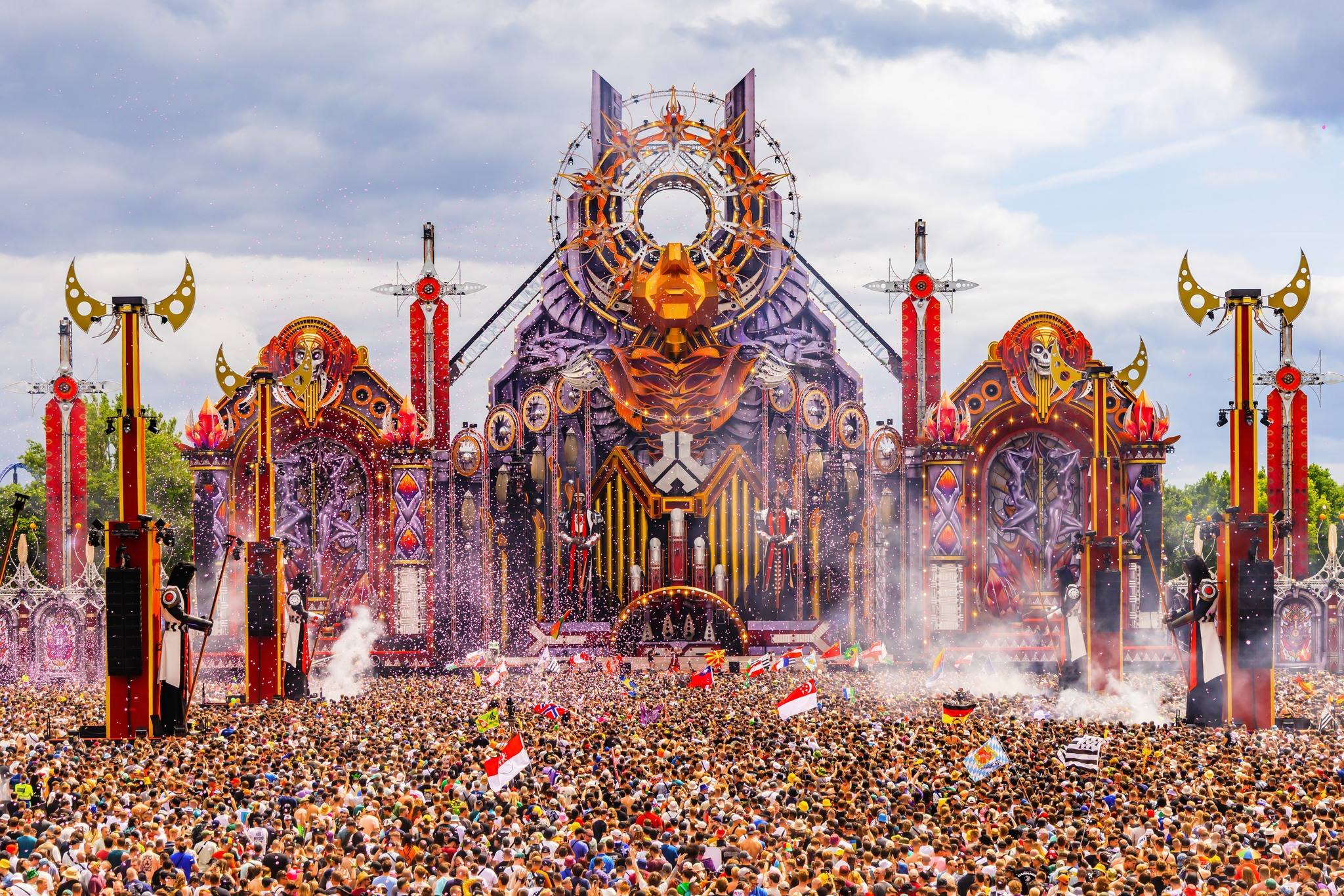
Defqon.1 2025 mainstage

2020 did not see Defqon.1 held after the Dutch prime minister Mark Rutte declared that all events in the Netherlands were cancelled until September 2020 due to the ongoing COVID-19 pandemic. Defqon.1 was held virtually in 2020 and 2021, with sets from participating performers streamed from the Defqon.1 website. The festival was held in person again in 2022, with over 100,000 unique visitors.

The 2025 edition marked the 25th of Q-dance Sunday programming featured an extended five-hour set chronicling the history of the genre, featuring appearances by 61 producers.

Due to the 2026 European heatwaves, organizers initially announced on Thursday, 25 June, that it would not admit single-day ticket-holders for Friday and Saturday, in order to reduce crowd sizes as a safety measure down to 55,000 per day. On Midnight, 26 June, it was announced that the festival had been cancelled in full due to the Code Red extreme heat warning issued by the Royal Netherlands Meteorological Institute. Q-dance stated that all ticketholders would be refunded. Selected headlining performances and the endshow were filmed with no audience for premieres on the Q-dance YouTube channel.

== Format ==
The festival's format has traditionally featured colour-coded stages, each devoted to specific genres of hard dance and related genres, and running for all or part of the event. The Red stage is traditionally the main outdoor stage, serving as the site of the main headlining acts and other recurring features, including the headlining "Spotlight" set closing Friday night, the "Power Hour" on Saturday afternoon, the "Legends" set on Sunday featuring veteran acts, and closing "endshows" on Saturday and Sunday featuring light and pyrotechnic displays. In 2017 and 2025, the Legends set was instead an extended set featuring multiple acts highlighting the history of hardstyle up to that point, marking the 15th anniversary of the festival and the 25th anniversary of Q-dance respectively.

The Blue stage serves as the main indoor stage; it hosts an opening night on Thursday known as "The Gathering", and then primarily focuses on rawstyle for the remainder of the festival. The Black stage primarily focuses on hardcore, the UV stage focuses on euphoric and uptempo music, the Yellow stage focuses primarily on uptempo hardcore and frenchcore, Indigo focuses on raw and extraraw, while Magenta focuses on "classic" music, Purple focuses on up-and-coming acts, and Green focuses on hard techno.

== International editions ==
=== Defqon.1 Australia ===
Starting in 2009, Defqon.1 was first hosted in Sydney, New South Wales, in mid-September, at the Sydney International Regatta Centre. The promoter for the event was Q-Dance Australia (led by Simon Coffey), a subsidiary of dance event conglomerate LiveStyle Inc. The event targeted a young crowd, aiming their promotion attempts at the 18-25 year old demographic. The event was described by festival goers and mainstream Australian media as having a cult-like following.

The venue is owned and operated by the NSW Government's Office of Sport. For a number of years, fans of the event had been somewhat critical of the venue's location, being logistically challenging to access. Getting to the venue for most attendees required at least an hour's train ride from Central Station, followed by a queue for a shuttle bus which transported people from Penrith Station to the centre.

At the 2013 edition, a 23 year old who had travelled from Victoria to attend the festival started having seizures before midday, only an hour into the festival. He was taken to Nepean Hospital and communicated to hospital staff that he had consumed three pills, but died shortly afterwards. Due to the early timing of medical complications, NSW Police attracted criticism for their handling of the event. Extensive security protocols and drug detection dogs outside the venue led some to suspect the death was the result of "body stuffing", where those in possession of illegal substances quickly consume them to evade detection. Q-Dance Australia has always advertised and maintained a "zero-tolerance" stance on drug use at its events.

Following success in its earlier years, in 2015, the Australian edition was extended to two days, with the Friday being exclusively for those camping, and Saturday being the main festival day. On the night of the Saturday, at 11:30pm, after all the acts had finished playing, paramedics arrived to the festival's campsite to find 26 year old Albury man Nigel Pauljevic unconscious in his tent. He was taken to the nearby Nepean Hospital where he later died. Toxicology results later showed he had consumed MDMA during the festival. Police later issued a statement claiming Paulijevic's death was not the fault of Q-Dance Australia or any other parties associated with the organisation of the festival. The 2015 edition remained the only instance of a large-scale hardstyle festival in Australia facilitating a multi-day event with camping.

==== 2018: Final Edition & Subsequent Cancellation ====
In 2018, Q-Dance Australia was celebrating its decade anniversary hosting Defqon.1 in Sydney. 30,000 attendees made their way to the Sydney International Regatta Centre, along with 180 police officers and 20 detectives.

During the event, Diana Nguyen, 21, and Joseph Pham, 23, died as a result of drug related complications. Three other attendees presented to hospitals in critical condition, 13 attended Nepean Hospital with drug-related complications, and up to 700 people sought help from medical staff. A coronial inquest into their deaths was launched in 2019, also focussing on the deaths of four other young people at NSW Music festivals over the previous 18 month period. Health officials claimed while deaths due to drug related complications had always happened at music festivals, 2017-18 saw noticeably more casualties than usual.

Coroner Harriet Grahame later found that only two doctors were on site during the event, and that one was looking after an attendee suffering from asthma complication when Nguyen and Pham were carried into the medical area, both unconscious, only minutes apart. Both Coffey and the medical contractor, EMS Australia (who was the medical contractor on site for all six festival deaths investigated by the coroner) admitted their risk assessment for the event was not adequate. Grahame was also critical of several police practices, including strip searching and drug detection dogs, and the general intimidating presence the practices supported, as being a barrier towards harm minimisation. Coffey expressed support for the legalisation of more harm minimisation tactics in NSW, such as drug amnesty bins.

Following the event, the NSW Premier Gladys Berejiklian declared she would do anything within her power to stop the event from taking place within the state ever again, citing a track record of four deaths in five years. Despite pleas from the public, including Paulijevic's father, and the threat that the hard dance scene would resort to going underground, Berejiklian softened her language but remained resolute that Defqon.1 would not return.

In early 2019, on the eve of the 2019 NSW State Election, NSW legislators passed the Music Festivals Act 2019, along with changes to licensing laws. The licensing changes identified 14 "high-risk" festivals which would have to reapply for new licences. Defqon.1 was included in this list. Industry insiders expressed frustration at the changes, claiming new rules were confusing, vague, rushed through parliament and overly bureaucratic. On 29 May 2019, it was announced that the 2019 edition of Defqon.1 Australia would not go ahead after being unable to secure a new venue. The Sydney International Regatta Centre had withdrawn its support for the event amid scrutiny over drug overdoses at previous editions, and new licensing requirements.

=== Defqon.1 Chile ===
Defqon.1 was briefly organized in Chile, taking place in December. The festival took place in 2015 and 2016 at Centro de Eventos Munich in Peñaflor, near Santiago, before being discontinued.

== Festival history ==
Year	Location	Anthem & Theme	Number of visitors*	Number of performers	Ticket Price	Token Price	Date
2003	Almeerderstrand, Almere, Flevoland, The Netherlands	30 Minutes (DHHD)	25,000	48			14 June
2004	Almeerderstrand, Almere, Flevoland, The Netherlands	Demolition (Tuneboy)	25,000	79			19 June
2005	Almeerderstrand, Almere, Flevoland, The Netherlands	Emergency Call (The Prophet)	25,000	85			18 June
2006	Almeerderstrand, Almere, Flevoland, The Netherlands	The Colour of the Harder Styles (Showtek)	27,500	103			17 June
2007	Almeerderstrand, Almere, Flevoland, The Netherlands	Get Wasted (Brennan Heart)	30,000	124			16 June
2008	Almeerderstrand, Almere, Flevoland, The Netherlands	Biological Insanity (Luna & Deepack)	30,000	119			14 June
2009	Almeerderstrand, Almere, Flevoland, The Netherlands	Scrap Attack (Headhunterz)	35,000	104			13 June
2009	Sydney International Regatta Centre, Penrith, New South Wales, Australia	Maximum Force (Zany)		52			19 September
2010	Almeerderstrand, Almere, Flevoland, The Netherlands	No Time To Waste (Wildstylez)	40,000	115			12 June
2010	Sydney International Regatta Centre, Penrith, New South Wales, Australia	Save Your Scrap for Victory (Headhunterz)		72			18 September
2011	Walibi Holland Evenemententerrein, Biddinghuizen, Flevoland, The Netherlands	Unite (Noisecontrollers)	45,000	127			25 June
2011	Sydney International Regatta Centre, Penrith, New South Wales, Australia	Psychedelic Wasteland (Toneshifterz)		72			17 September
2012	Walibi Holland Evenemententerrein, Biddinghuizen, Flevoland, The Netherlands	World of Madness (Headhunterz, Wildstylez & Noisecontrollers)	55,000	150+	€140.00 Weekend + Camping		21–23 June
2012	Sydney International Regatta Centre, Penrith, New South Wales, Australia	True Rebel Freedom (Wildstylez)					15 September
2013	Walibi Holland Evenemententerrein, Biddinghuizen, Flevoland, The Netherlands	Weekend Warriors (Frontliner)	60,000	200+	€95.00 Weekend + Camping		21–23 June
2013	Sydney International Regatta Centre, Penrith, New South Wales, Australia	Scrap The System (Brennan Heart)	18,000				14 September
2014	Walibi Holland Evenemententerrein, Biddinghuizen, Flevoland, The Netherlands	Survival of the Fittest (Coone)	60,000	200+	€105.00 Weekend + Camping		27–29 June
2014	Sydney International Regatta Centre, Penrith, New South Wales, Australia	Unleash the Beast (Code Black)					20 September
2015	Walibi Holland Evenemententerrein, Biddinghuizen, Flevoland, The Netherlands	No Guts, No Glory (Ran-D)	60,000	200+	€120.00 Weekend + Camping		19–21 June
2015	Sydney International Regatta Centre, Penrith, New South Wales, Australia	No Guts, No Glory (Frontliner, Dillytek & 360)	21,000	97	$171.80		18–19 September
2015	Centro de Eventos Munich, Santiago de Chile, Santiago Providence, Chile	Unleash The Beast (Wildstylez)	30,000	33			12 December
2016	Walibi Holland Evenemententerrein, Biddinghuizen, Flevoland, The Netherlands	Dragonblood (Bass Modulators)	100,000	200+	€122.50 Weekend + Camping		24–26 June
2016	Sydney International Regatta Centre, Penrith, New South Wales, Australia	Dragonblood (Toneshifterz, Code Black & Audiofreq)	25,000		$168		17 September
2016	Centro de Eventos Munich, Santiago de Chile, Santiago Providence, Chile	Dragonblood (Frontliner)	20,000				10 December
2017	Walibi Holland Evenemententerrein, Biddinghuizen, Flevoland, The Netherlands	Victory Forever (Frequencerz)	150,000	250+	€143 Weekend + Camping	€2.70 = 1 Token	23–25 June
2017	Sydney International Regatta Centre, Penrith, New South Wales, Australia	Eye of the Storm (D-Block and S-Te-Fan)	30,000	50+	$170		16 September
2018	Walibi Holland Evenemententerrein, Biddinghuizen, Flevoland, The Netherlands	Maximum Force (Project One)	185,000	250+	€155 Weekend + Camping	€2.89 = 1 Token	22–24 June
2018	Sydney International Regatta Centre, Penrith, New South Wales, Australia	Dedicated To The Core (Coone)	30,000	50+	$194.00		15 September
2019	Walibi Holland Evenemententerrein, Biddinghuizen, Flevoland, The Netherlands	One Tribe (Phuture Noize, Keltek, Sefa)	78,000 Unique visitors	218		€3.00 = 1 Token	28–30 June
2020	Walibi Holland Evenemententerrein, Biddinghuizen, Flevoland, The Netherlands	Primal Energy (D-Block & S-te-Fan)	-	-			Cancelled due to the COVID-19 pandemic. Instead, an @Home event took place.
2021	Walibi Holland Evenemententerrein, Biddinghuizen, Flevoland, The Netherlands	N/A	N/A	N/A	N/A	N/A	Cancelled due to the COVID-19 pandemic. Instead, an @Home event took place.
2022	Walibi Holland Evenemententerrein, Biddinghuizen, Flevoland, The Netherlands	Primal Energy (Haunted Grounds) (D-Block & S-te-Fan; under their live act Ghost Stories)	100,000	300+	€226 Weekend + Camping	€3.60 = 1 Token	23–26 June
2023	Walibi Holland Evenemententerrein, Biddinghuizen, Flevoland, The Netherlands	Path of the Warrior (Sub Zero Project)	250,000	350+	€249 Weekend + Camping	€3.80 = 1 Token	22–25 June
2024	Walibi Holland Evenemententerrein, Biddinghuizen, Flevoland, The Netherlands	Power of the Tribe (Sound Rush)	250,000	350+	€280 Weekend + Camping	€4.00 = 1 Token	27–30 June
2025	Walibi Holland Evenemententerrein, Biddinghuizen, Flevoland, The Netherlands	Where Legends Rise (Vertile)	268,236	370+	€325 Weekend + Camping	No Tokens. Payment with wristband	26–29 June
2026	Walibi Holland Evenemententerrein, Biddinghuizen, Flevoland, The Netherlands	Sacred Oath (D-Sturb)			€340 Weekend + Camping	No Tokens. Payment with wristband	25–28 June, cancelled on the 25th due to a red warning for extreme heat by the Royal Netherlands Meteorological Institute
2027		The Deepening (Rebelion)					

== See also ==
- List of electronic music festivals
