= Studio Sessions (Headhunterz album) =

Studio album by Headhunterz
- Released: March 8, 2010
- Recorded: 2009–2010
- Genre: Hardstyle, hard trance, dubstyle
- Length: 59:37
- Label: Scantraxx
- Producer: Willem Rebergen

Headhunterz chronology
Project One: The Album (2007)	Studio Sessions (2010)

Studio Sessions is a studio album by Dutch hardstyle artist Headhunterz. The album was released to much hype, and includes collaborations with many other prominent artists in the hardstyle community such as The Prophet, Wildstylez, D-Block & S-te-Fan and Noisecontrollers among others. The album was announced shortly after the X-Qlusive edition that Headhunterz hosted on January 31 in the Heineken Music Hall in Amsterdam, and it was hinted at previously.

== Track listing ==
1. Headhunterz, Brennan Heart – The MF point of perfection (Original dubstyle mix) – 04:12
2. Headhunterz – Psychedelic – 04:27
3. Chuckie – Let the bass kick (Headhunterz edit) – 2:44
4. Headhunterz – Hate it or love it (Live edit) – 03:15
5. Headhunterz, Wildstylez – Blame it on the music (D-Block & S-Te-Fan rmx) – 03:47
6. Project One – Raiders of the Sun (Headhunterz edit) – 02:57
7. Builder – Her voice (Headhunterz rmx edit) – 04:34
8. Headhunterz, Wildstylez, MC Villain – Stuck in your head – 04:32
9. Headhunterz – Emptiness – 04:28
10. Headhunterz – Forever az one (Noisecontrollers rmx) – 04:17
11. Headhunterz – Dreamcatcher – 04:06
12. Proppy & Heady – The b-side – 05:01
13. Headhunterz – Subsonic (Hardbass edit) – 03:23
14. Headhunterz – The sacrifice (Evil edit) – 02:41
15. Headhunterz, Noisecontrollers – The space we created – 04:40
