= Project One =

Hardstyle supergroup consisting of Headhunterz and Wildstylez

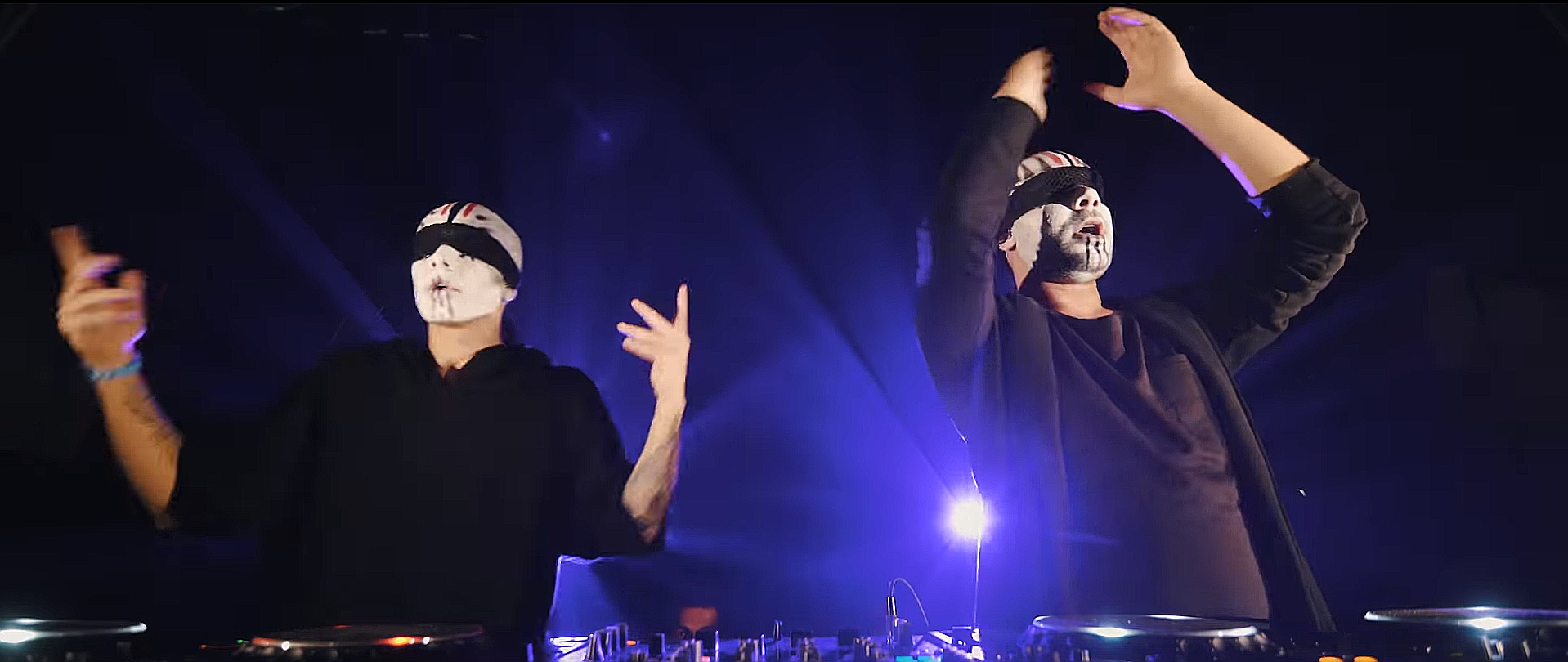
- Metekohy (right) and Rebergen (left) performing as Project One at Qlimax in 2016

Background information
- Origin: Netherlands
- Genres: Hardstyle
- Years active: 2008-present
- Labels: Scantraxx, Art of Creation
- Members: Headhunterz, Wildstylez

Project One is a DJ and production supergroup consisting of two Hardstyle artists, Willem Rebergen (Headhunterz) and Joram Metekohy (Wildstylez). The act has released an album, an EP, and several singles.

The act is characterised by short bursts of activity, releasing music and performing together for a limited amount of time before returning to their respective solo careers. They were active from 2008-2010, 2016-2018, and returned to activity in late 2025.

== Origin & Debut (2008-2010) ==
Prior to producing their debut album, Headhunterz and Wildstylez created two tracks together, titled "Blame it on the Muzic" and "Project 1". These tracks were not attributed to the supergroup, only as "Headhunterz vs Wildstylez". It was only after the dual release that the latter track would stick as their duo name, albeit stylised as "Project One".

Their 2008 album Headhunterz and Wildstylez Present: Project One was made over the course of three months in the Dutch record studio called "Dreamland Studio's" from DJ The Prophet, finishing approximately one track each week. Album samplers were released afterwards, featuring the full versions of each album track, and a remix release, were released under Scantraxx Reloaded. In an episode of WIldstyez' podcast, Timeless, the pair reminisced on the creation of the album, where they spent a significant amount of time working and essentially living together. They even attempted to produce a track on the album under the influence of drugs, which did not pan out as expected. The album has become a cult classic, prompting Scantraxx to issue new vinyl represses in 2026. Copies of the original CD retail well beyond their release price, with some buyers asking for €300>.

To promote the release of their album, the pair performed at hardstyle events, debuting together at the Blue stage of Defqon.1, and headlining the 2008 edition of Qlimax. Some sources claim the album debut was supposed to be at InQontrol earlier in the year, but Headhunterz had to cancel the appearance due to appendicitis. The pair perform in a distinctive look, with black capes draped over white painted faces and eyes covered with blindfolds. From 2010, the pair stopped performing together, with the intention of focussing on their solo music careers.

== First Return of Project One (2016-2018) ==
With the exception of a single surprise performance at X-Qlusive Wildstylez in 2013, the pair made no announcements to play again. Since their last performance, Headhunterz had moved away from producing hardstyle music all together, and seldom appeared on hardstyle stages in the mid-2010s, preferring to focus his efforts on more mainstream markets. While rumours had been circulating of the duo's return throughout 2016, the December lineup of Knockout Circuz (the precursor to Knockout Outdoor) confirmed that Project One would recommence performing live. A few days later, it was announced that Project One would be returning to Qlimax 2016: Rise of the Celestials. Their comeback to Qlimax was hailed as an historical occasion for the hardstyle scene, one of the most notable duos returning to the stage, playing their classic tracks as well as some new edits and remixes.

After playing a number of shows throughout 2017 as Project One, Headhunterz announced his return to producing and performing hardstyle music as a solo act. A few months after he had announced his return, Project One announced their first EP and their first release in 9 years, titled EP I. EP I contained three new tracks and a remix of the pair's self titled debut track. The title implied that more new music would potentially follow. EP I was released on Q-Dance Records. Early following year, Headhunterz and WIldstylez announced the founding of their joint-venture record label, Art of Creation. The label was named after the ninth song from their debut album, released almost a decade prior.

In 2018, the duo were announced in the Defqon.1 lineup, and with 6 weeks leading up to the festival, it was announced Project One were the anthem creators for the 2018 edition. The track "Maximum Force" was premiered at Midnight Mafia in Sydney, while Project One had returned to Australian shores. The anthem and their subsequent Sunday mainstage set received mixed reviews from the hardstyle community, with some claiming Q-Dance to be milking the cash-cow of Headhunterz official return to Defqon.1. Project One closed 2018 with a trio of new remixes released on Q-Dance Records, released by three separate artists (Phuture Noize, KELTEK & Sefa) whom ended up being the eventual 2019 Defqon.1 Anthem creators. Prior to 2019, the previous trio to collaborate on a Defqon.1 Anthem was 2012's "World of Madness", featuring both members of Project One and Noisecontrollers. After these remixes, the duo released two more singles, "Resurrection" and "Journey Of The Mind" on their co-founded label, Art of Creation.

== Inactivity & Second Return (2025-) ==
Following a period of activity of a little over two years, much like their first period of activity, the duo stopped playing together while continuing to release solo music. In 2020, Wildstylez released a Headhunterz' remix of his song, "Children of Drums" - otherwise, the duo released no new music. In the years which followed, the duo teased the existence of a new Project One album, and a leaked version with some unfinished music was accidentally published to YouTube. This occurred after their label had tried to get their music uploaded in order to mount copyright claims against rogue accounts who tried to upload unreleased Project One music via the ContentID system. They also teased a new collaboration with another prominent hardstyle duo, D-Block & S-Te-Fan, specifically their "Ghost Stories" act, although this never materialised. D-Block & S-Te-Fan have since officially retired the "Ghost Stories" act.

During an extended period of inactivity for Project One, 2023 saw Headhunterz and Wildstylez playing a number of back-to-back sets, including at Vroeger Was Alles Beter (VWAB), Midnight Mafia and Parookaville. These sets included brand new Project One songs which had never been released previously, such as "Rise and Fall", "Move with the One", "Move Your Body" and "The Story Unfolds". Following these performances, later in 2023, Headhunterz' made the decision to take a break from performing in all capacities, ending speculation of a Project One return.

In October of 2025, VWAB announced a return show for Project One, on Saturday, the 3rd of January, 2026. The show sold out, selling 15,000 tickets in 15 minutes. A second show was subsequently announced for the Sunday. Less than a month later, the duo dropped their first official release in seven years, titled "The Upside Down". This release also coincided with the airing of the final episode of Netflix's television program Stranger Things, to which the song was a tribute towards. The lead-up to the VWAB event also saw the release of a mini-documentary about the duo, and the re-release of their famous 2008 self-titled album onto 12" vinyl, titled "The Origin Series".

In 2026, Project One have performances planned in Spain, Mexico, Finland, Sweden and Canada.

== Discography ==
=== Album: Headhunterz and Wildstylez Present: Project One (Scantraxx Reloaded) (2008) ===
Track	Title
01	Prelude
02	Life Beyond Earth
03	The World Is Yours
04	Fantasy or Reality
05	Best of Both Worlds
06	Numbers
07	Halfway There
08	The Story Unfolds
09	The Art of Creation
10	It's a Sine
11	Rate Reducer
12	Raiders of the Sun
13	The Zero Hour

=== EP: EP I (Q-Dance Records) (2017) ===
Track	Title
01	Luminosity
02	One Without A Second
03	It's An Edit
04	Project One (Sound Rush Remix)

=== Singles ===
Year	Title	Label
2018	Maximum Force (Defqon.1 Anthem 2018)	Q-dance
2018	The Zero Hour (Phuture Noize Remix)	Q-dance
2018	Life Beyond Earth (KELTEK Remix)	Q-dance
2018	The Art of Creation (SEFA Remix)	Q-dance
2018	Resurrection	Art Of Creation
2018	Journey Of The Mind	Art Of Creation
2025	The Upside Down	Art of Creation
2026	Move With The One	Art of Creation
