= Studio Sessions =

Studio Sessions may refer to:

- Studio Sessions (Headhunterz album), 2010
- Studio Sessions (Terry Ronald album), 1990
- Studio Sessions, 2002 album by Grand Slam

== See also ==
- Studio Sessions, Chicago 1956, a jazz collection produced by Duke Ellington
- Studio Sessions, New York 1962, a jazz collection produced by Duke Ellington
- Studio Sessions, 1957, 1965, 1966, 1967, San Francisco, Chicago, New York, a jazz collection produced by Duke Ellington
