= Headhunterz =

Dutch DJ and record producer (born 1985)

- Headhunterz in 2012

Background information
- Also known as: Nasty D-Tuners; Antifact; Project One (with Wildstylez); • Headhunterz
- Born: Willem Rebergen; 12 September 1985 (age 41)
- Origin: Veenendaal, Netherlands
- Genres: Hardstyle; electro house; Dutch house; progressive house; big room house; future bass; future house
- Years active: 2003–present
- Labels: Scantraxx; Q-dance; Ultra; HARD with STYLE; Mainstage; Revealed; Art Of Creation; Spinnin'
- Members: Willem Rebergen
- Past members: Bobby van Putten
- Website: headhunterz.com

Willem Rebergen (born 12 September 1985), better known by his stage name Headhunterz, is a Dutch DJ and music producer. Rebergen is also a voice actor. He has done dubbing for several films and TV series. He started his career in 2005 working on hardstyle music.

Headhunterz has performed at Qlimax, Defqon.1, Q-Base, In Qontrol, Decibel, Hard Bass, Electric Daisy Carnival and Tomorrowland.

He released his work on Scantraxx through his own sub-label, Scantraxx Reloaded, but in 2013 he started his own record label, HARD with STYLE. He signed with the North American electronic dance label Ultra Music in 2013 and left his own label in 2015. Since June 2017, he officially returned to the hardstyle community at the closing ceremony of Defqon.1 Weekend Festival 2017.

In 2018, Headhunterz and fellow DJ Wildstylez started a new hardstyle label called Art of Creation. At the end of 2023, Headhunterz announced he would be taking an indefinite break from performing live. He has since returned to performing live in a limited capacity as of late 2025.

== Biography ==
=== Early life and career ===
Willem Rebergen was born on 12 September 1985 in Veenendaal, Netherlands. From an early age Rebergen had an interest in music. Having struggled with bullying at school, Rebergen looked for a distraction to make himself happy and so joined a local kid's choir. Here he had his first exposure to a professional studio, recording Christmas albums with the choir. This experience left Rebergen interested and inspired by the process of creating music from the other side of the studio. In 2003, while working at a clothing store he was offered tickets to Qlimax from friends who could not attend. This was his first exposure to hardstyle music. This experience gave him the impetus to forge a music career and in his own words from then on he was "devoted to hardstyle and from that point interested in how to make the music. I wanted to make that kind of music."

He purchased some turntables and connected them to his mixer practicing his DJing, while simultaneously making music in FL Studio, a digital audio workstation. Rebergen began sending demos out to labels under the alias Nasty D-Tuners, a duo project he formed with close friend Bobby van Putten. In 2004, Nasty D-Tuners entered and won the Defqon.1 DJ contest, winning a spot on that year's lineup.

Rebergen and van Putten heard of a new hard dance music label, Hardcontrol, that was opening in Veenendaal. In 2005, a year and a half after their performance at Defqon 2004, Nasty D-Tuners were signed to Hardcontrol Records having two successful releases, with their work being played by then major hardstyle producers/DJs. Also in 2005, Rebergen and van Putten began attending a DJ class at the Rock Academy in the Netherlands. Rebergen found his time at the academy frustrating, due to a lack of encouragement towards producing hardstyle and negative responses to the genre as a whole. Alienated by his experience at the academy, Rebergen continued to send out Nasty D-Tuners demos to respective labels, one eventually reaching Scantraxx founder, Dov Elkabas (The Prophet). Seeing promise in the young duo, having heard of their performance at Defqon.1, Nasty D-Tuners were signed to Scantraxx in late 2005. Unable to keep the alias Nasty D-Tuners due to disagreements with the former label, the name Headhunterz was chosen. By the end of 2005, Rebergen and van Putten had performed at major hardstyle events including Defqon.1, Q-Base and The Prophet's X-Qlusive, all of which increased their profile within the hardstyle scene.

=== 2006-2007: Scantraxx and the beginning of Headhunterz ===
"The Sacrifice"
"The Sacrifice" by Headhunterz, from their debut release on Scantraxx.

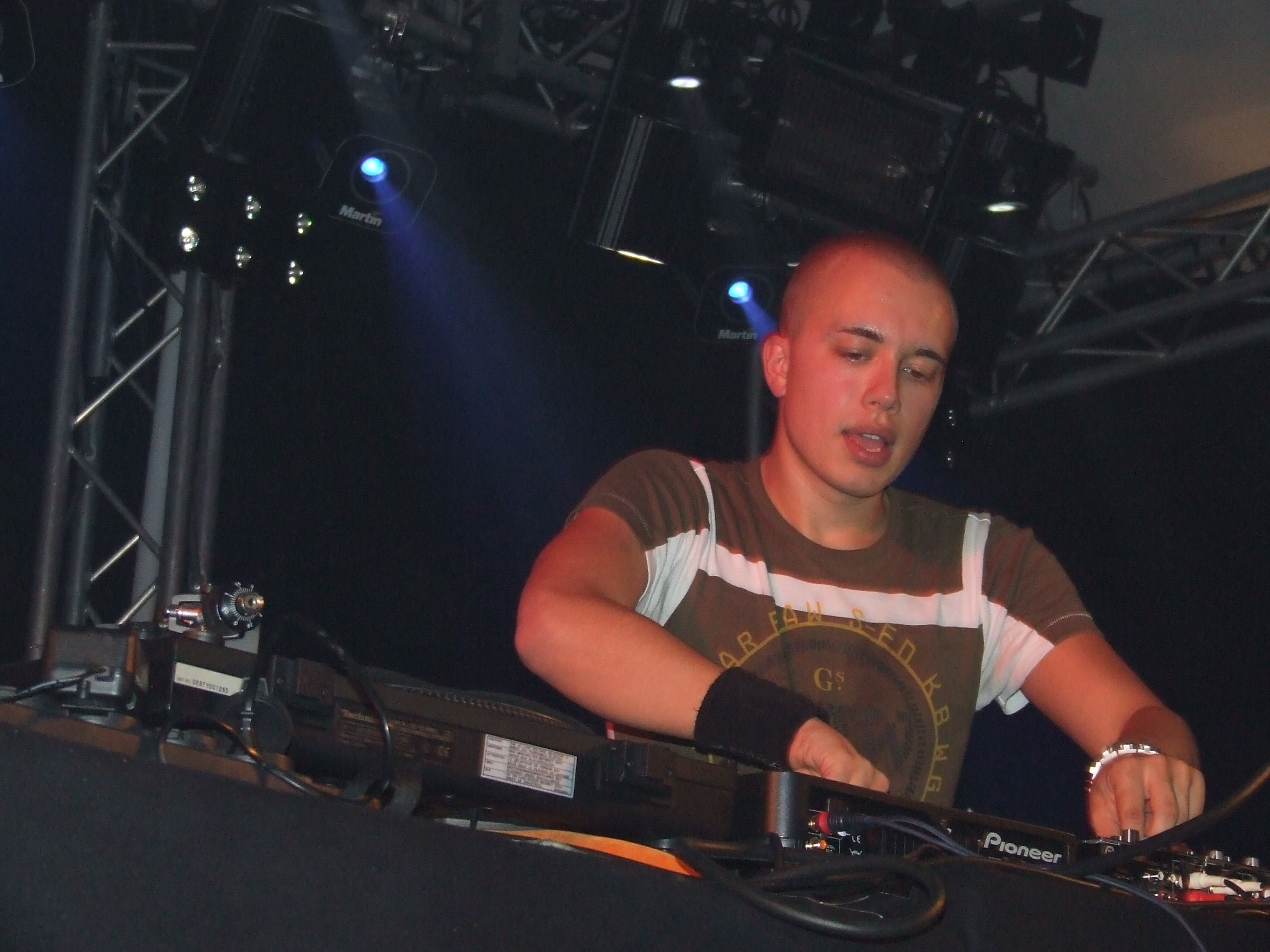
Headhunterz performing in Doetinchem, Netherlands in 2007

The year 2006 saw the first Headhunterz release "Aiming for Your Brain/ Left Some Answers", on Scantraxx Special. Their debut release was followed by "The Sacrifice/D-Tuned", again on Scantraxx Special. "The Sacrifice" was the duo's most successful hit to date, Rebergen since stating his fond memories of the positive reception that The Prophet gave him the first time he heard it. Problems soon began to emerge when Rebergen came to the conclusion that he would be unable to perform and record for Scantraxx while simultaneously completing his course at the Rock Academy. Rebergen told van Putten of his decision to leave the academy and hoped he would join and commit himself to Headhunterz and Scantraxx. van Putten then made the difficult decision to leave Rebergen, Scantraxx and Headhunterz and continue with his musical studies at the Rock Academy. Rebergen's first solo performance as Headhunterz was the 2006 edition of the Q-Dance event, Defqon.1. Following the final release of van Putten credited Headhunterz work, Scantraxx gave Rebergen his own sub label Scantraxx Reloaded which he would administer. Headhunterz' first release on Scantraxx Reloaded was the three track vinyl EP Victim of My Rage released in late 2006. The Prophet continued to nurture the young talent, inviting Headhunterz to perform alongside him at the popular annual Q-Dance event, Qlimax.

The year 2007 proved to be a successful year for Headhunterz. He had his first collaborations with fellow Scantraxx artists The Prophet and Abject (DJ Frontliner). Along with the collaborations, Headhunterz also released several successful solo tracks such as "Forever Az One" and "Rock Civilization" which is his most popular track on the streaming service Spotify. Headhunterz then performed at the 2007 editions of Q-Base and Qlimax. He then created his first major anthem for the 2007 edition of Qlimax, "The Power of the Mind". Headhunterz then had his first solo performance at Qlimax and played alongside DJs who he admired, Technoboy and The Prophet.

=== 2008: Headhunterz & Wildstylez Presents: Project One ===
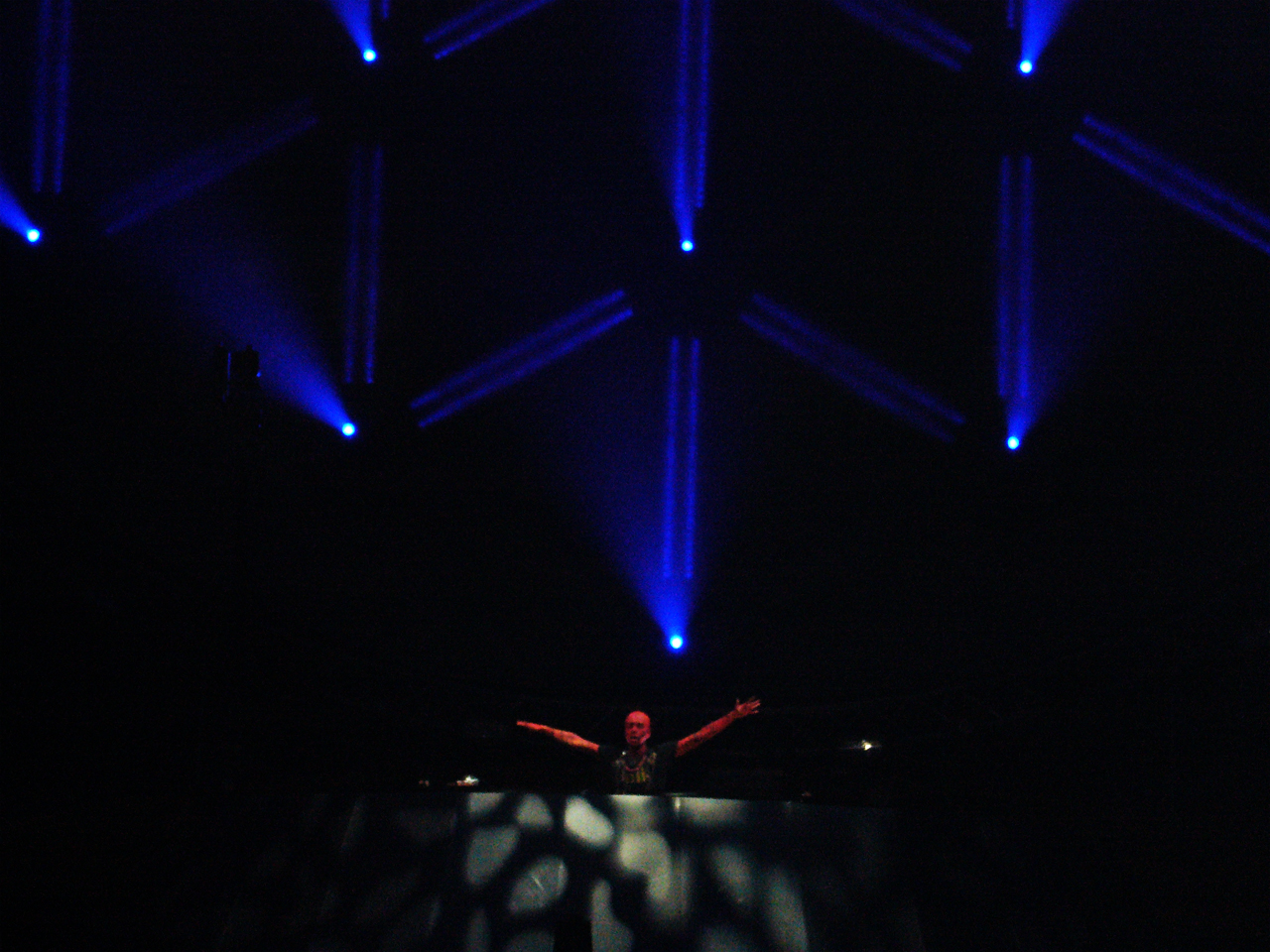
Headhunterz solo DJ performance at Qlimax 2008

In 2008, Headhunterz had his first collaboration with fellow Scantraxx artist Wildstylez. Their first song "Blame It on the Music / Project 1" was released in March and proved a success. It also provided the impetus for the launch of a new project and debut album for the pair, Project One. Finishing in under three months, producing an average of one track a week, Headhunterz and Wildstylez completed their 13-track debut album, Headhunterz & Wildstylez Present: Project One. The album was planned to debut at In Qontrol in a special one-hour set, showcasing the album. This performance was cancelled when Headhunterz suffered appendicitis. The album debuted at Defqon.1 2008, and was officially released shortly after on both CD and digital formats on 25 July with Dutch graphical designer Ruud van Eijk providing the artwork. Project One contained tracks such as "Life Beyond Earth", "The Art of Creation", "The Story Unfolds", "Best of Both Worlds" and "Fantasy or Reality" all proving to be successes on the dance floor. The album was a defining influence on the direction hardstyle would take in the years to come, with its emphasis on synth based trance influenced melodies and heavy use of pitched kicks. A Project One Tour followed along with 6 full-length album samplers and 1 remix sampler, all released on Scantraxx Reloaded. Along with Project One, Headhunterz had three solo releases that included the tracks "Just Say My Name", "Subsonic" and "Reloaded Part 2" all on Scantraxx Reloaded, along with a collaboration with Italian hardstyle DJ Tatanka, "Call It Music".

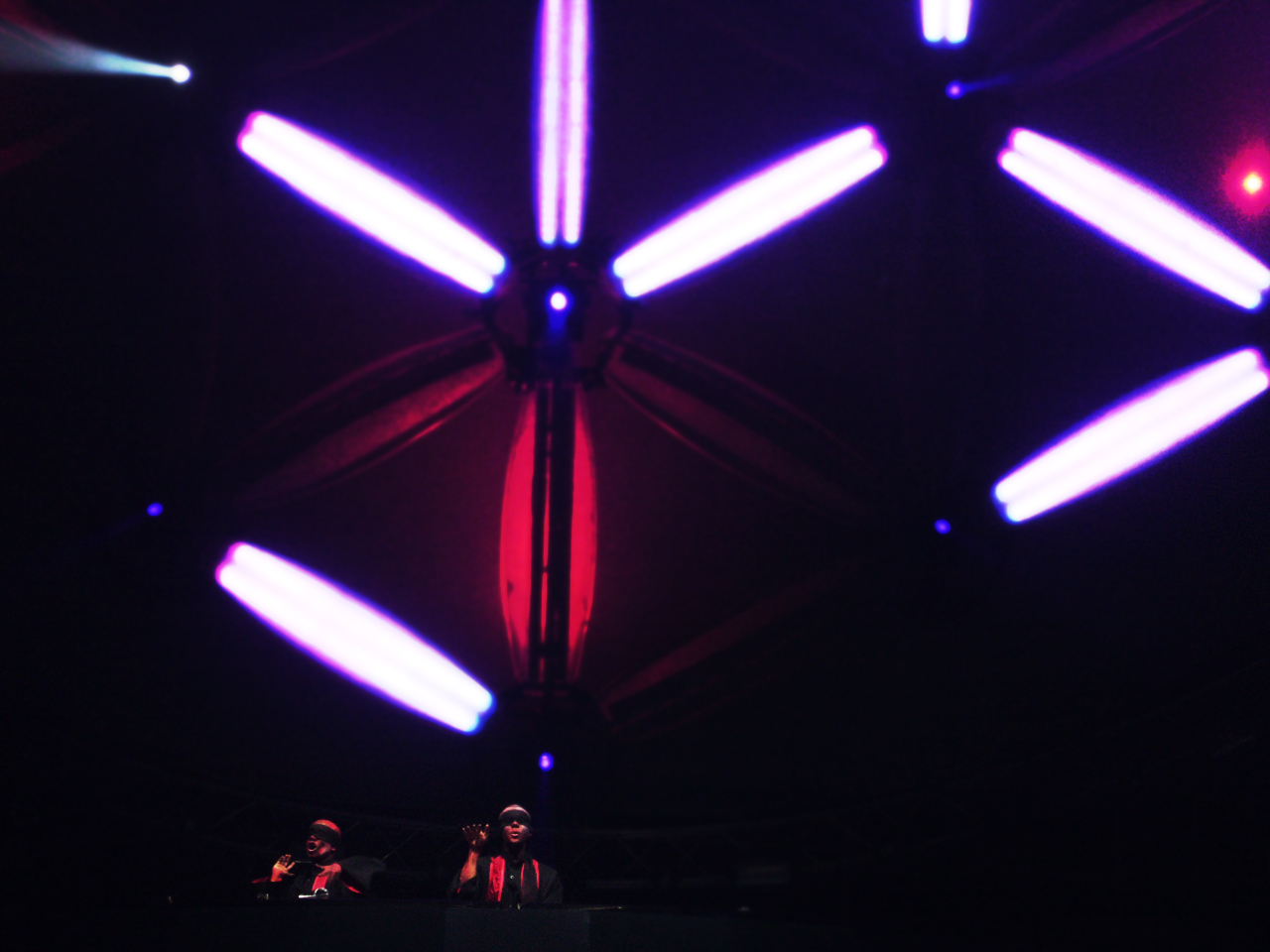
Project One at Qlimax 2008

=== 2009-2011: Studio Sessions, HARDwithSTYLE ===
2009 saw Headhunterz release seven new singles/EPs. Amongst these releases was the 2009 Defqon.1 Anthem, "Scrap Attack". This opportunity to create the anthem, saw Headhunterz close the Mainstage of Defqon.1 for the first time. Speaking about the moment, Headhunterz stated that he achieved one of his long-term goals within Hardstyle that night and felt "complete happiness". Along with the anthem, 2009 was a notable year in regards to collaborations for Headhunterz. He again teamed up with Wildstylez and along with Noisecontrollers created the incredibly popular anthem "Tonight". In the Q-Dance harder styles top 1000 poll held in late 2013, "Tonight" was voted into second place. "The Summer of Hardstyle", made with The Prophet, proved to be an instant hit at events. Gaining inspiration from older Hardstyle DJ, Zenith, the track was a break from recent Headhunterz work with its emphasis on Reverse bass and simple scratching sounds from vinyl. The Project One Tour reached its finale with a first time visit to Australia. The duo making multiple appearances at the final editions of "Transmission", a popular music event that was held in Sydney and Brisbane.

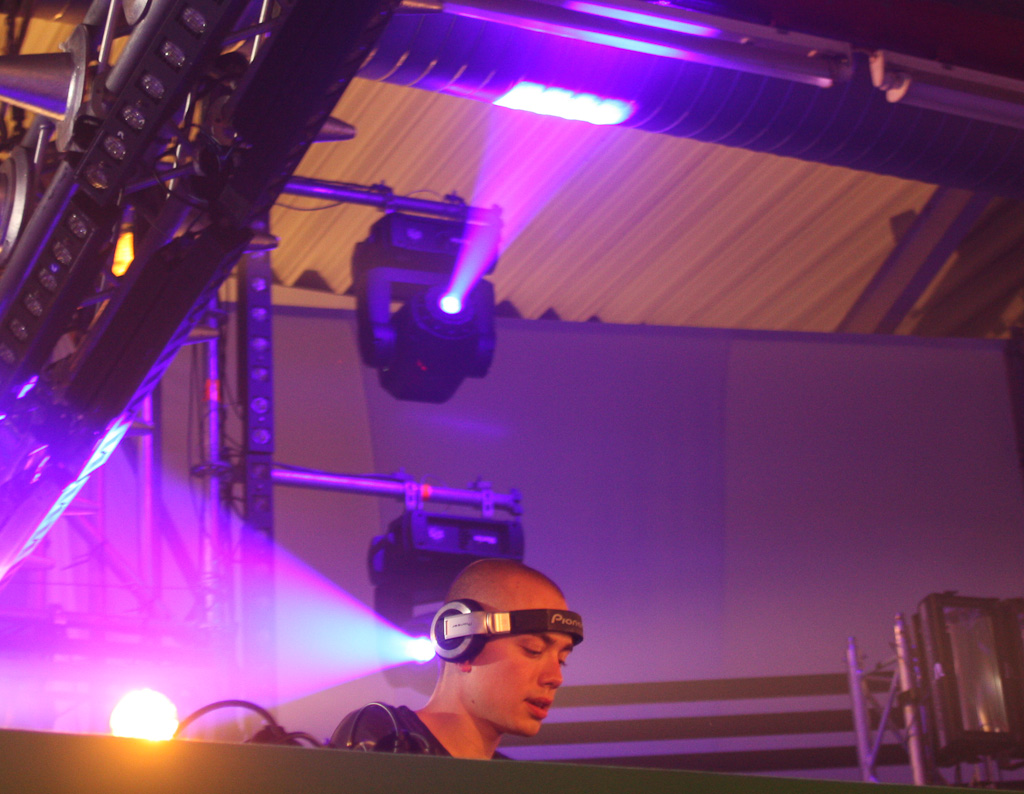
Headhunterz live on stage at the Hardstyle Prison at the Syndicate 2010

2010 reflected Headhunterz and Hardstyle's growing popularity around the world, in his own words 2010 was "a year where my international bookings overtook my national ones." At the beginning of 2010, Headhunterz was offered the chance to host his own X-Qlusive. Held on 30 January at the Heineken Music Hall, Amsterdam, X-Qlusive:Headhunterz featured Wildstylez, The Prophet, Noisecontrollers and Brennan Heart joining Headhunterz on the main stage. Headhunterz described X-Qlusive as the highlight of 2010 as "It was an amazing night - a milestone in my career and personal life. I could have never imagined getting so far." In the buildup to X-Qlusive, Headhunterz revealed he was planning the release of his first studio album, Studio Sessions. Released on 8 March, Studio Sessions was a 15 track album containing a mixture of new unreleased tracks, collaborations, edits of older Headhunterz tracks and remixes done by Headhunterz and others. The Album release was followed by a world tour visiting The United States, Australia, Russia, Canada and many performances across the Netherlands. For the second year in a row, Headhunterz was asked to make a Defqon.1 Anthem, this time for the Australian edition, "Save Your Scrap for Victory". Along with the anthem, Headhunterz' other releases in 2010 was the "psychedelic" EP, which featured the popular title track along with "Dreamcatcher" and "Emptiness" and an EP with Noisecontrollers. 2010 also saw Headhunterz make his first appearance in DJ Mag's yearly top 100 DJ list, coming in at 36th, the highest Hardstyle DJ in the list. It was the first year Hardstyle artists were featured on the top 100 with Noisecontrollers, D-Block & S-te-Fan and Showtek all ranking in the top 100 alongside Headhunterz.

At the beginning of 2011 Headhunterz was recognized for his achievements in the past year at the 8th annual Hard Dance Awards, claiming best European hard dance DJ, best international DJ and best track, "Psychedelic". Speaking on social media he stated “Thanks so much for all the nice congrats. I can't describe how good it feels to get so much recognition for my work. Respect to all of you!”. 2011 saw the start of the monthly podcast, HARDwithSTYLE. First released on 27 May 2011 through iTunes, SoundCloud and YouTube, the hour-long podcast was promoted with the tagline "Bringing you the music that comes from within!" and was aimed at showcasing Headhunterz's favorite tracks of the month, from both established and up and coming producers. With many unheard and new tracks getting their first broadcast on HARDwithSTYLE, the podcast quickly become one of the most popular electronic music podcasts. Headhunterz again was ranked in DJ Mags yearly top 100 DJs list, coming in at 17th, the highest of any Hardstyle DJ and confirming his place as one of the most sought after Hardstyle DJs. 2011 had significantly less releases from Headhunterz compared to past years mainly due to a large amount of time and effort being put into what would become his 3rd studio album which was planned for a release in 2012. Nevertheless, Headhunterz had his last solo release on Scantraxx Reloaded, with the EP "From Within / The Message is Hardstyle". "The Message Is Hardstyle" had a mixed reception, many disliking the track due its soft kicks and perceived ironic lyrics given the nature of the song. The track "Make it Loud (Headhunterz Remix)" popular for its reverse bass intro, also finally gained a release on Blutonium Records. Headhunterz also had many notable performances in 2011, performing at Decibel, The Qontinent, Defqon.1, X-Qlusive: D-Block & S-te-Fan and Thrillogy. Headhunterz also had a major tour of the US and Mexico visiting 18 cities along the way and also performed at the first Mysteryland to be held outside of the Netherlands, in Chile.

=== 2012-2015: Sacrifice, Ultra Records ===
In 2012 Headhunterz released his second studio album Sacrifice on 15 March. The 10 track album was the culmination of work done in 2011 and Headhunterz donated all profits to Dance4Life, an international initiative that mobilises and unite young people (13–19 years old) to push back the spread of HIV/AIDS. The album was a collection of new tracks, edits and collaborations. Amongst the track list were standouts, "Dragonborn", a previous freely released track inspired by the game, The Elder Scrolls V: Skyrim featuring the popular "FUS RO DAH" sample. "Doomed", a track that was produced in response to the significant criticism of his musical direction and track "The Message is Hardstyle", feature lyrics that make light of the many 'haters' that feature on an artist's web blog. Other highlights were the early hardstyle inspired, "Back In the Days", the 2012 Hardbass Anthem, "Eternalize" and a collaboration with Psyko Punkz, "Disrespect".

Along with Sacrifice, Headhunterz recorded and released a number of remixes for popular house artists stating, "Doing remixes for other genres makes so much more sense than remixing stuff in your own genre...it gave me a whole different approach in producing hardstyle and I hope the same fans will benefit from that." He had his first song release on Ultra Music with one such remix, "Lessons in Love" by Kaskade. He remixed the Hardwell song, "Spaceman" which saw a release on Hardwell's Revealed Recordings. Two remixes for German House producer, Zedd, "Spectrum" was released for free through Headhunterz's social media and "Clarity (Feat. Foxes)" was released on the Clarity Remixes EP released through Interscope Records. Lastly, he remixed Nicky Romero's popular 2011 track "Toulouse". All these remixes proved to be incredibly popular and increased his exposure outside of Hardstyle, being played by many House DJs in their sets.

Headhunterz, in collaboration with Wildstylez and Noisecontrollers, produced the 2012 Defqon.1 Anthem for the Dutch edition of the popular festival. "World of Madness" was released on 16 August with the intro of the song featuring elements of the three previous Defqon.1 Anthems that the three had produced consecutively, "Scrap Attack" in 2009 by Headhunterz, "No Time To Waste" in 2010 by Wildstylez and "Unite" in 2011 by Noisecontrollers.

Headhunterz again climbed up the ranking in DJ Mags top 100 DJ list, coming in at 11th reflecting the further influence hardstyle was having within the dance music scene. In October 2012 Headhunterz hosted and performed at another Q-Dance showcase event Q-Dance presents: Headhunterz - HARDwithSTYLE. Held at the newly opened Ziggo Dome in Amsterdam, the event was a sellout featuring artists such as Code Black, Adrenalize, Isaac, Ran-D and Adaro who all had featured prominently on the HARDwithSTYLE podcast since its beginning. Along with this Headhunterz performed at both the Australian and Netherlands editions of Defqon.1, both editions of Mysteryland, The Qontinent, Tomorrowland, Electric Daisy Carnival, Q-Dance Presents: Scantraxx 10 Years, Reverse and X-Qlusive: Noisecontrollers.

In February 2013, Headhunterz signed with major dance music label Ultra Music. The signing was a landmark in Hardstyle reflecting the growth of the genre both inside the Netherlands and internationally, growth of which Headhunterz had been at the forefront of. Speaking on his signing, Headhunterz stated:

The deal with Ultra Music is a turning point in my career as an artist and producer. Having complete creative control in every aspect of what I do as Headhunterz will no doubt allow me the space and creativity to be true to hardstyle whilst being able to spread my music on an even larger scale backed by their resources, I am thrilled to get started on this exciting new adventure.

"Colors (Feat TaTu)"
"Colors" By Headhunterz featuring vocals from TaTu. "Colors" was his first release on Ultra Music

On 30 August, Headhunterz had his first official solo release on Ultra Music with his track, "Colors" (Feat. TaTu). It entered the Dutch iTunes Top 100 at number 5 and number 2 under the "dance" category. A remix of "Colors" by trap group Yellow Claw followed, also released on Ultra Music. In November he had his second release, the collaboration with fellow label artist, Krewella for their track "United Kids of the World". The track was launched in November by Ultra Music in partnership with DoSomething.org, a non-profit organization with the goal of motivating young people to take action around social changes, with a campaign focusing on the problems of cyberbullying.

Along with his signing to Ultra Music, Headhunterz launched his own record label HARDwithSTYLE Records. Not connected to Ultra, the label focuses on promoting the harder styles of dance music from both established artists and new, fresh talent. The label aims to be as non-restrictive as possible, "Different from the standards in our scene thus far, we are not being restrictive with the artists who give the label music. We want to sign singles, no options, no commitments other than artists giving us great music we love and we push, no agenda, no-nonsense, no bullshit. Just music. For artists who have contracts with other record labels, no problem, if your label will give you a 'pass' then we would love to have a record from you." The first release on HARDwithSTYLE was The Leaked EP by Headhunterz, featuring tracks "Reignite", with vocals from Malukah and "The Power of Music", a track which Headhunterz rates as one of his best and most complete tracks of his career.

Headhunterz first release for 2014, "Breakout", is his first collaboration with Australian Hardstyle artist, Audiofreq and was released in March. In the Spring of 2014, Rebergen announced he was working with Breda duo, W&W. Rebergen then released 'Shocker', a 132 BPM track with Hardstyle kicks and synths and choppy vocals faced with W&W's image of house. When W&W performed at Tomorrowland they brought Headhunterz as a guest and they played Shocker and premiered another song. The other song was released in November 2014 and the title was called 'We Control the Sound.' In late December, The Worlds #1 DJ Hardwell announced he would be working on a track with Rebergen for his album United We Are the track was called "Nothing Can Hold Us Down". The track also featured Dutch vocalist Haris.

Despite the negative response of his fanbase, Rebergen commits to his creative freedom and heads for a new direction. In September, the Origins project kicks off on his HARDwithSTYLE label, a collection of 8 years worth of Headhunterz classics.

=== 2015-2016: Creative freedom ===
Early 2015, Headhunterz goes on a 6-week North-America tour, as part of Steve Aoki's Neon Future Experience Tour. 'Once Again', Headhunterz' solo track, gets released on Hardwell's Revealed Recordings and the Headhunterz remix of Armin van Buuren featuring Mr. Probz - Another You is released on Armada Music. At Ultra Music Festival in Miami, Steve Aoki invites Headhunterz on stage to premiere their collaboration, yet to be released. Headhunterz' collab with Crystal Lake, 'Live Your Life', is released on Spinnin Records in May and reaches #3 in Beatport's overall charts.

In interviews, Headhunterz says that his changes in style have to do with him claiming his creative freedom.

It was time for a change, to go back to experimenting and rediscovering my own, artistic boundaries. I was doing the same thing in hardstyle for more than 8 years and I needed a fresh breath of air. Not being limited to whatever style has given me lots of inspiration.

Despite committing to his creative freedom, he continued to play hardstyle in his sets. On 26 June 2016, Rebergen made a surprise appearance at Defqon.1 2016, alongside Technoboy and The Prophet. The reaction from the crowd left him emotional and he has promised to never forget his roots. That same day, Headhunterz and KSHMR released "Dharma" on Spinnin' Records.

Ending 2016, Headhunterz returned with Wildstylez as Project One and played some new tracks at Qlimax 2016 and Knockout Circuz in Australia.

=== 2017: Return to hardstyle roots ===
In late June, Headhunterz returned to the mainstage of Defqon.1 in the Netherlands as the track "Sacrifice" was playing on stage. He made a speech claiming that he would return to hardstyle, announcing that it was the wrong choice to leave the hardstyle scene.

“Dear members of the hardstyle community. Exactly one year ago I stood before you. And it was a life-changing experience for me. In this world you can be anyone doing anything if you fight for it. But I’m done fighting, done running. Whatever is out there in the world to achieve. There is only one thing left for me to do. And that, is to surrender. To who I really am. Thank you, for showing me the way.”

In the midst of the hardstyle community's hype for new Headhunterz music, he released his first original hardstyle single in over three years, fittingly titled "Destiny". The songs lyrics highlighted Headhunterz' commitment to the hardstyle music:

"Travellers on a unending voyage of discovery, a voyage fuelled by desire to know our true calling, seeking for timeless wisdom beneath the ever changing depts of heaven. Trapped in confusion, armed with melodies to strike our emotion, waging the war within, until one day... Sooner or later, we see. This music is our destiny."

"Destiny" went on to win the 2017 Q-dance Hardstyle Top-100 annual competition, where fans vote for their favourite tracks from the past calendar year. It was his first track to win this honour.

=== 2018-2022: Art of Creation, The Return of Headhunterz ===
On 2 February 2018, Headhunterz announced the inception of his new label in collaboration with Wildstylez, Art of Creation. The label is described as "a dynamic platform where years of experience, friendship, talent and passion come together and spark new inspiration on the pursuit for quality and greatness in music." In the same interview, he described Sub Zero Project as having some of the “best hardstyle production since [his] own”.

Headhunterz released his third studio album titled The Return of Headhunterz on 2 March 2018, which was dubbed as his "return to hardstyle production" by Dancing Astronaut. The Return of Headhunterz contained 7 brand new tracks, including collaborations with Sub Zero Project, Sound Rush, and Wildstylez/Noisecontrollers. The latter's three-way collaboration, "No One Can Stop Us Now" marked their first in 6 years; they had not produced a track together since the 2012 Defqon.1 Anthem "World of Madness". Some critics labelled the track as a fitting sequel to the trio's 2011 collaboration, "Tonight".

Following the announcement of the DJ Mag Top 100 DJs poll for 2018, Headhunterz placed #28th and finished with the "Highest Hard" award, being the most popular harder styles DJ. Artists Radical Redemption and Angerfist congratulated fellow harder styles DJs, including Da Tweekaz, Brennan Heart, Miss K8 and Wildstylez; however, they failed to include Headhunterz in their congratulations. In response, Headhunterz released a diss track titled "Say My Name". While the track doesn't contain any direct references to Radical Redemption and Angerfist, the words "redemption" and "anger" feature heavily in the lyrics.

In 2019, Headhunterz was voted #29th in the DJ Mag Top 100 DJs poll, honouring him with the "Highest Hard" award again. It was the 8th consecutive time he would be voted into the DJ Mag Top 100 List, as he announced he would not be nominated in future editions of the competition. He citied an interest to focus more on himself and his own ambitions as an artist instead of defending his "Highest Hard" title. Akin to many decisions he has walked back throughout his career, he was subsequently renominated for the 2020 award, where he placed #46th. Angerfist unseated Headhunterz' reign as "Highest Hard", and after this final appearance, he has not featured in any edition of the DJ Mag Top 100.

During the COVID-19 pandemic, the hardstyle scene had to take a break from performing shows due to lockdown restrictions preventing large public gatherings. Headhunterz kept on producing music at home, and honed his musical skills, including learning how to play the piano. He also released a follow-up track to his 2012 hit "Dragonborn" - titled "Dragonborn Part 2". The sequel retained similar elements to its predecessor, including the iconic "Fus Ro Dah" sample. Also following in the path of its namesake track, an inability to clear the samples from the video game: The Elder Scrolls V: Skyrim meant that the track had to be released as a free download, in order to avoid a violation of copyright laws. After 8 years passing between the original and the sequel, Headhunterz released the third and final track in what had become a trilogy: "Dragonborn Part III (Oceans Apart)". The song (which contained no samples from The Elder Scrolls V: Skyrim, unlike the preceding tracks) was officially released on Art of Creation in October, and finished the year winning the Q-dance Hardstyle Top-100 annual competition.

Headhunterz would collaborate with Vertile for the first time in 2022, the new pairing producing "Before I Wake". The track was immensely popular in the hardstyle scene, eventually taking top honours in the Q-dance Hardstyle Top-100 annual competition. This was his third track to win the competition in the competition's decade-long history.

=== 2023-Present: Hiatus from performing, subsequent re-return ===
In August 2023, Headhunterz released his newest collaboration with Vertile: "Lost Without You", which debuted at Defqon.1's endshow some weeks prior. In an interview, Vertile explained how the song explores themes regarding the importance of differences, whose energy can balance each other out and create harmony. Five days later, Headhunterz announced that he would stop performing by the end of the year. He cited concerns about his mental and physical health as reasons why he would stop performing, as he had been travelling and performing around the world for 15 years. In his Instagram announcement on the issue, he made it clear that he would continue producing music and maintain some involvement in the hardstyle scene, but he was pursuing a more balanced lifestyle. "Lost Without You" would go on to win the Q-dance Hardstyle Top-100 annual competition for 2023.

Following ceasing performing at the end of 2023, Headhunterz released 3 singles in 2024 on Art of Creation. The first of these was released in February, titled "How Far Can You Go", a collaboration with Final Day; the second of these was "Moonlight", featuring mainstay hardstyle vocalist Diandra Faye. The third track, released towards the end of 2024, was "Live Forever". In an interview published to his YouTube channel, Headhunterz claimed "Live Forever" took two years to produce, with unfinished versions of the track being played in his sets from the middle of 2023 (while he was still performing). Despite not performing at all in 2024, Headhunterz won the Q-dance Hardstyle Top-100 annual competition with "Live Forever". It was his fifth time winning the competition, and his third consecutive year producing a track which topped the voting.

In early 2025, Q-dance invited Headhunterz as a guest to provide feedback to upcoming artists as part of their inaugural "Red Race" series, where lesser known Hardstyle artists competed for a single slot on Defqon.1's mainstage in a web-series format similar to a reality TV programme.

On the 13th of December 2025, Headhunterz performed a surprise return show at EPIK Festival in Sydney, Australia, hosted by HSU Events. He was billed as a "mystery guest" and his performance was not confirmed until his 2009 track "Rock Civilisation" began playing and he appeared on stage. Headhunterz returned again on 3 January and & 4 January 2026 as Project One with Wildstlyez for two shows hosted by Hardstyle classics promoter Vroeger Was Alles Beter (VWAB) in Den Bosch, Netherlands.

== Filmography ==
=== Voice-over (dubbing) ===
Rebergen frequently dubs English-language films and TV series into Dutch.

Production	Role
The Land Before Time	LittleFoot
Harry Potter	Fred & George Weasley
Rocket Power	Sam Dullard

== Discography ==
- Headhunterz & Wildstylez Presents: Project 1 (2008)
- The Best of Headhunterz (2009)
- Studio Sessions (2010)
- Sacrifice (2012)
- The Return of Headhunterz (2018)
