= DJ The Prophet =

Dutch DJ and producer

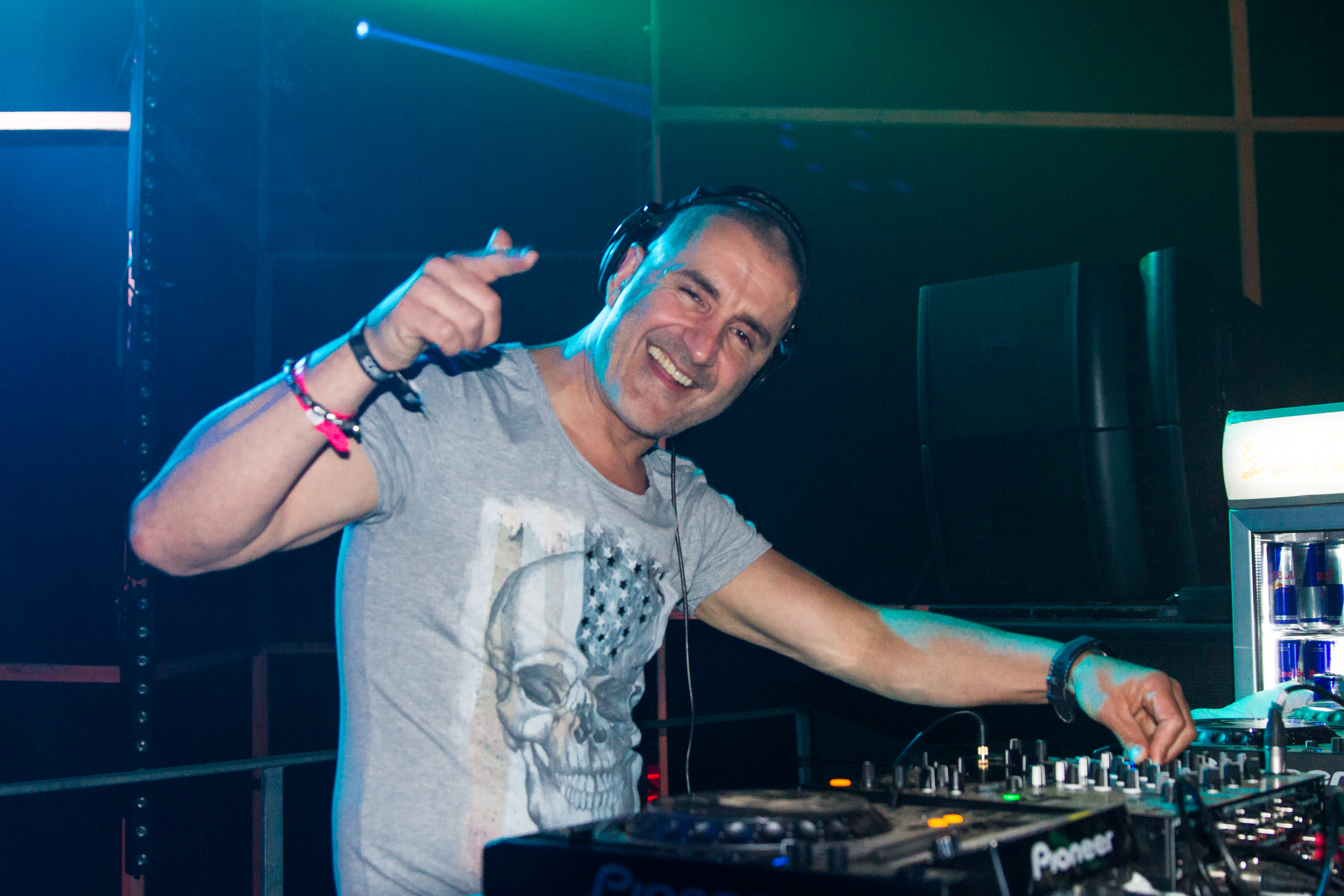
- The Prophet at Airbeat One Festival 2015

Background information
- Also known as: The Godfather of Hardstyle
- Born: Dov Joseph Elkabas
- Origin: Amsterdam, Netherlands
- Genres: Hard dance, hardstyle
- Years active: 1988–2023
- Label: Scantraxx
- Website: djtheprophet.com

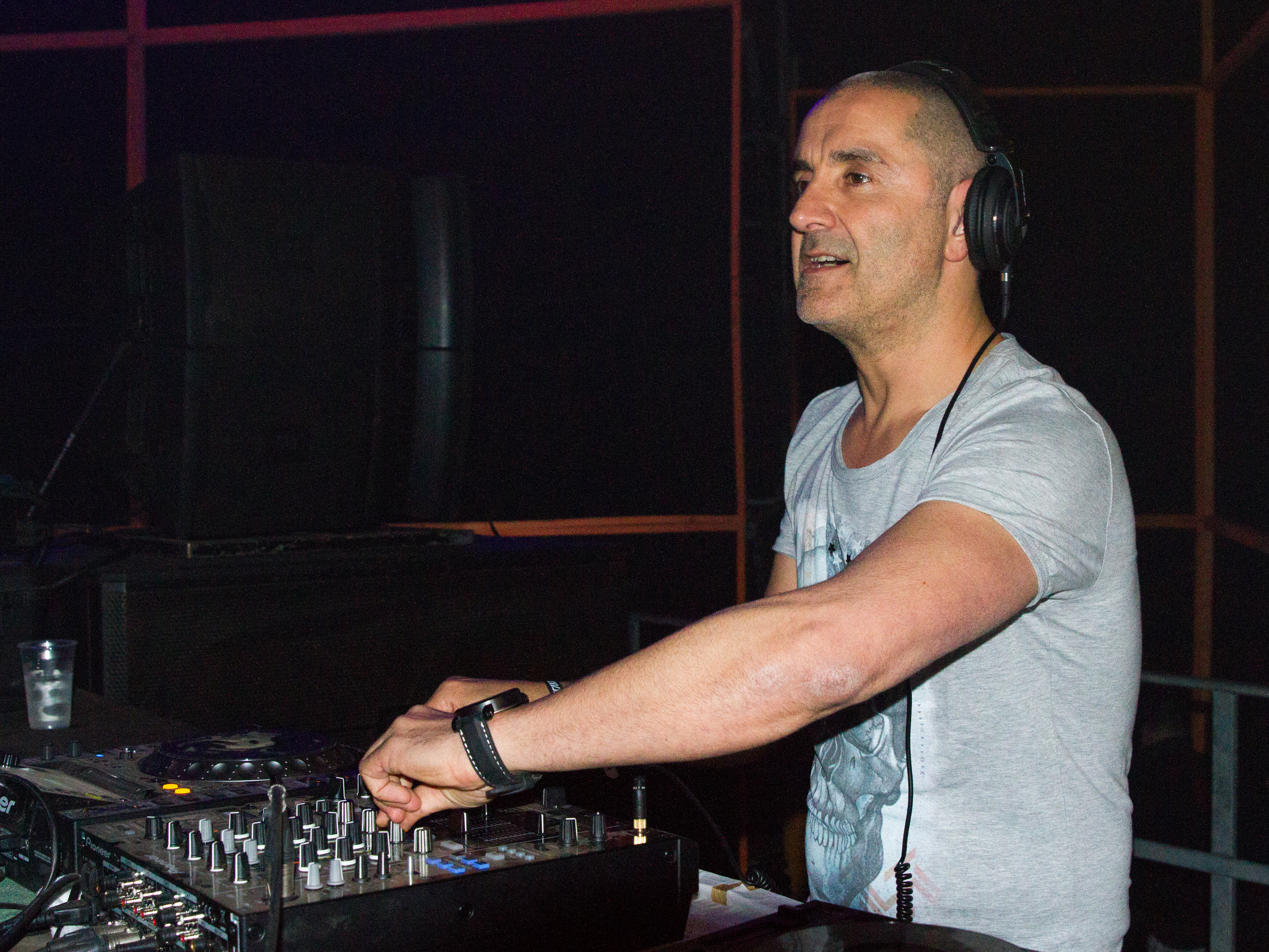
The Prophet, 2015

Dov Joseph Elkabas (born 5 November 1968), known professionally as DJ The Prophet, is a Dutch former hardcore techno and hardstyle DJ and producer. The Prophet is also the owner of one of the largest hardstyle record labels, Scantraxx.

== Biography ==
The Prophet started his career as a DJ in 1983 after he discovered turntables at a disco in Amsterdam. He was working in a hotel at the time, and performing as DJ on the side. He was asked to choose, and made the choice to DJ full-time. He started spinning hip hop music before a switch to house in 1988. About three years later, he set up a team of DJs known as "The Dreamteam", together with DJ Dano, Buzz Fuzz and Gizmo. The team was a huge success in the gabber scene.

Later, The Prophet switched from hardcore to hardstyle because he did not like the fact that the hardcore community wanted the music to become 'harder'. He is famous both as a DJ and as a producer. He is also the owner of Scantraxx Records, one of the largest Dutch hardstyle record labels.

His productions were released on vinyl and CDs on labels such as ID&T or Q-dance. He is also behind many DJ mixes which were published on CDs, such as the Thunderdome CDs, and he was involved in projects including Hardheadz (along with DJ Pavo) and Punk Brozz (with DJ Zany).

In 2014 he released his first album, Louder, which took about nine months to produce.

As of 2023, The Prophet announcing his retirement after more than three decades of making music and deejaying across the globe. He will be doing so once he concluded his "From The Hard" tour visit, which include Defqon.1 Weekend Festival 2023 as his final destination.

== Albums ==
Album name	Year	Label	Other info
In The Mix	1996	ID&T	mix-cd
Best Of The Prophet	1997	ID&T	
Go Get Ill	2000	Masters Of Hardcore	10" record under the alias Buzz Fuzz & The Prophet
Kick Azz	2002	Masters Of Hardcore	Under the alias The Masochist
Scantraxx presentz: HardheadZ	2002	Scantraxx / Digidance	mix-cd featuring DJ Pavo
Qlimax 5	2003	Q-dance	mix-cd
Bounzz 2004 - The 2nd Edition	2004	BMG	mix-cd with contributions from DJ Dano
History Of Hardcore 4 - Dreamteam Edition	2004	Sony	mix-cd + DVD
Scantraxx Volume 2	2004	Sony / Scantraxx	mix-cd dubbel
3xhard3r	2005	Digidance	mix-cd with contributions from DJ Ruthless and Korsakoff
Hard - 80 Minutes Hard In The Mix	2006	Cloud 9 Music / Scantraxx	mix-cd hardstyle / hardcore
The Prophet Hard2	2006	Cloud 9 Music / Scantraxx	mix-cd electro-house / hardstyle / hardcore
The Prophet Hard3	2008	Cloud 9 Music / Scantraxx	mix-cd jumpstyle / hardstyle / hardcore
Houseqlassics Ten Years	2009	Q-dance	mix-cd house/ hardcore
Louder	2014	Scantraxx	Album

== Singles ==
Track title	Year	Label	Release info
The Source	1992	DT Music	Under the alias Avantguarde
To The Rhythm	1992	DT Music	Under the alias Collage
Cook & Curry	1993	Mokum Records	Under the alias Cookiemunsta
Dominatin	1993	Dreamteam Productions	Daniël Leeflang
Thunderdome 4 EP	1993	Dreamteam Productions	
Dominatin' EP	1993	Dreamteam Productions	
Allright Now Here We Go!!!!	1994	Dreamteam Productions	
Featuring "The Highest Sense..."	1994	Say No More	
Housetime!	1995	Test Crash Records	
Go Out Of Your Mind (ft. Ithaka)	1995	Mokum Records	Under the alias Pineapple Jack
Big Boys Don't Cry	1995	Pengo Records	
I Love You	1995	Boedha Records	
Freeze Now	1995	Boedha Records	
The Way You Make Me	1995	Pengo Records	With DJ Delirium
We ♥ To Party	1995	Test Crash Records	With DJ Delirium
Cyberzone	1995	Cyberzonic Records	
I Like It Loud	1996	Test Crash Limited	
Da Boomin' Bass	1996	Test Crash Records	With DJ Delirium
Feels So Real	1996	ID&T	With DJ Delirium
What Iz Life	1997	Dreamteam Productions	
Power Pill	1997	H2OH Recordings	With Omar Santana
Return Of The Zilla	1997		The Rose
Slam The Place	1998	ID&T	With E-Rick & Tactic
Roll The Place	1998	ID&T	With Buzz Fuzz
Harakiri Vol. 1	1999	BZRK Records	With 50% of the Dreamteam & DJ Buzz Fuzz
Go Get Ill	2000	Masters of Hardcore	With DJ Buzz Fuzz
Scratched	2003	Scantraxx	With DJ Dana
Hardstyle Baby	2003	Scantraxx	
Follow The Leader	2004	Scantraxx	With DJ Duro
Follow The Leader	2003	Q-Dance, ID&T	
Another Track	2004	Scantraxx	With SMF
Bitcrusher/Mani-X	2005	With The Beholder & Max Enforcer	Seismic Records
Shizzle the Rmx	2005	Scantraxx	With DJ Duro
Stereo Killa	2005	ScantraXXL	With Marc Acardipane
Emergency Call	2005	Q-Dance	Defqon.1 anthem 2005
Big Boys Don't Cry/Allright Now Here We Go!!!	2006	ScantraXXL	
Payback	2006	M!D!FY	With Brennan Heart
Dipswitch / OG Pimp	2006	Scantraxx Special	
Stampuhh!!	2006	Scantraxx	With Deepack
Fucking Pornstar/Cocain Bizznizz	2006	Scantraxx	
Big Boys Don't Cry	2006	Scantraxx	
High Rollerz / Scar Ur Face	2007	Scantraxx Reloaded	With Headhunterz
Remixx3d 001	2007	Scantraxx	
Cold Rockking / Alive	2008	Scantraxx Silver	With Wildstylez
Chubby / Fuck-R	2008	Scantraxx	
Summer of Hardstyle	2009	Scantraxx	Proppy & Heady
Psycho Ex	2009	Titanic Records	With Technoboy, ft. Shayla
Recession / Morphed	2009	Scantraxx	
Elites / My Worship	2010	Scantraxx Silver	
My Religion / Don't Touch Me / Black Stripez	2010	Scantraxx Silver	
I Like It Rammuhloud (X-Pander Mash-Up)	2011	Free Release	
Wake Up! / Till U Believe It / Face the Enemy (Zany Rmx)	2011	M!D!FY	With Brennan Heart
Wake Up! (The Prophet's Hardcore Remuxx)	2011	Free Release	With Brennan Heart
Shizzle (2011 Remuxx)	2011	Scantraxx	With Dj Duro
Forget About It	2011	Scantraxx	
Pitch Black	2011	Scantraxx Special	Official Black 2011 Anthem
Window of Time / Really Don't Care	2011	Scantraxx	
Ordinary Life	2012	Scantraxx Special	
One Moment	2012	Scantraxx	
Mindkiller	2012	Scantraxx	
BOOOM!! / Punk MF	2012	Scantraxx	
Smells Like Hardstyle	2012	Free Release	
Someone Like You	2012	Free Release	Feat. Ndrah Lake
Bring Me Down	2012	Scantraxx	With Audiofreq, feat. Teddy
We Are One!	2012	Scantraxx	With Audiofreq
Reflections Of Your Dark Side	2012	Scantraxx Special	Official Black 2012 Anthem
My Style	2012	Scantraxx	
H3Y!	2013	Scantraxx Special	
Ordinary Life	2013	SectionZ Records	KATFYR Remix
The Bizz	2013	Scantraxx	
Prozaxx (X-Pander Kick Edit)	2013	Free Release	with Zatox
R3tro	2013	Scantraxx	
So Wrong	2013	Scantraxx	With Popr3b3l
Everlasting	2013	Scantraxx Special	
Summer of 2011 (Prophet Refixx)	2014	Origins	Proppy & Heady
Tracking The Beat	2014	Scantraxx	
Triple F (Fight For Freedom)	2014	Scantraxx	With The Anarchist
Hoo-Ey	2014	Scantraxx	
Conquer the World	2014	Scantraxx	With Audiotricz
Embrace	2014	Scantraxx	
For The Better	2014	Scantraxx	
H3Y! (2014 Edit)	2014	Scantraxx	
I'm The King	2014	Scantraxx	With Adaro
Evil Rains	2014	Scantraxx	With Rob Gee
Echoes	2014	Scantraxx	feat. Lilly Julian
Afsluitplaatje	2014	Scantraxx	
Make Me Stay	2014	Scantraxx	With Noisecontrollers & Leonie Meijer
Breaks E.P. 1	2014	Scantraxx	
Breaks E.P. 2	2014	Scantraxx	
I'm A Superman / Say Forward	2014	Negus Roots	With Neville Brown
Louder	2014	Scantraxx	
IDGAF (I Don't Give A Fuck)	2014	Scantraxx	With The Anarchist, feat. Rob Gee
Dark Matter	2014	Scantraxx	With The Anarchist, (Official Ground Zero 2014 Anthem)
Rokkstar	2014	Scantraxx	
Kikkdrum	2014	Scantraxx	
Till I Die	2015	Scantraxx	
Jumpp upp	2015	Foolish records	With Darkraver
Mixmaster	2015	Scantraxx	
Here We Go!	2015	Foolish Records	
Reverse Bass	2015	Scantraxx	
Till I die	2015	Scantraxx	
Flute	2015	Scantraxx	
Caramba	2016	Scantraxx	
Hunt You Down	2016	Scantraxx	With Rob Gee
Desire	2016	Scantraxx	
Welcome To The Club	2017	Scantraxx	
One Of Us	2017	Scantraxx	
Tyrone	2018	Scantraxx	
Lights Out	2018	Scantraxx	
Wanna Play	2019	Scantraxx	
The Lonesome Boatman	2019	Scantraxx	
Get dumb!	2020	Scantraxx	
Wanna Play (270 BPM Terror Edit)	2020	Scantraxx	
The Miracle	2020	Scantraxx	
I Got A Dream	2020	Scantraxx	
Get Dumb (Melody Mix)	2020	Scantraxx	
Lay Low	2021	Scantraxx	
Creatures Of The Night	2021	Scantraxx	
It's My Beat	2021	Scantraxx	
Underworld	2021	Scantraxx	
Listen To Your Hardcore	2021	Scantraxx	
Esta Loca	2022	Scantraxx	
In Hardstyle We Trust	2022	Scantraxx	With Chuck Roberts
Never Fake	2022	Scantraxx	
Never Alone	2022	Scantraxx	
The Get Back	2023	Scantraxx	With Frontliner
Haters Gonna Hate	2023	Scantraxx	With Frequencerz
Killing No More	2023	Scantraxx	With Dr. Peacock
Ichiban	2023	Scantraxx	With Malice
Make Some Noise	2023	Scantraxx	With Level One
