= Noisecontrollers =

Dutch DJ

- Also known as: NCTRS; Pavelow; Killer Clown; SMD; Roughstyler; Kasparov; Williams Syndrome
- Born: Bas Oskam; 14 August 1980 (age 45); Veenendaal, Netherlands
- Genres: Hardstyle, Dutch house, Hardcore, Dubstep
- Occupations: DJ, musician, record producer
- Years active: 2005–present
- Labels: Mainstage Music; Q-Dance; Fusion Records; Scantraxx; Digital Age; Spirit of Hardstyle; Art of Creation
- Member of: NCBM
- Members: Bas Oskam (2005–present)
- Past members: Arjan Terpstra (2005–2013)
- Website: noisecontrollers.com

Bas Oskam, better known by his stage name Noisecontrollers, is a Dutch DJ and hardstyle music producer based in Veenendaal, Netherlands. Noisecontrollers was previously a duo before Arjan Terpstra left the project in 2013, prompting Oskam to continue as a solo act. They are regarded as one of the pioneers of hardstyle music, with an immense passion and focus in creating technical, emotional and euphoric hardstyle.

Noisecontrollers started producing hardstyle in 2005, beginning his career at Fusion Records. In 2010, he founded the label Digital:Age with frequent collaborator Wildstylez, which eventually ceased to release music in 2013. He released his second album on Q-Dance, before his third and fourth compilation albums were self-released. His final album to date was a collaboration with Bass Modulators (as part of group NCBM) which saw Noisecontrollers return to Q-Dance. Since his last album, he has founded his own record label, Spirit of Hardstyle.

Noisecontrollers has released five studio albums, all of which released between 2012 and 2016. He has also released over 200 individual tracks, and is currently working on his sixth studio album, Harmony. He has also produced tracks under different aliases and in different genres outside of hardstyle, most notably hardcore and dubstep. These sounds still inspire his production standards to this day.

== Career ==
=== 2005-09: Career origins, Fusion Records ===
Oskam and Terpstra began communicating with each other through an online forum, and while they were both Dutch, they lived in different parts of the country, making collaboration difficult. Noisecontrollers began in late 2005, when Terpstra, originally a fan of hip-hop, and Oskam, a trance producer, began working together to create melodic hardstyle music.

Prior to making music, Oskam was a high school geography teacher. Oskam has mentioned that the early years of music production took a toll on his social and personal lives, leaving him unable to fulfil social commitments and even requiring him to prematurely conclude his studies in 2008 to pursue music full time. He has also talked of the uncertainty of the early years, and while, in retrospect, he's happy he made sacrifices to produce better music, at the time it felt like a big gamble.

Their original songs focussed on replicating the sound of Donkey Rollers, a hardstyle group from the 2000s (including MC DV8 & Zany) who had cofounded one of the most popular hardstyle labels of the 2000s, Fusion Records. Fusion Records, upon hearing Noisecontrollers work, brought the duo to work with the label in their Eindhoven studios, before signing the duo on a permanent basis.

Their first official release, "Wanna Freak You", was released on Scantraxx sub-label DJS Records in 2007. They debuted as performing DJs the same year, and in many of their earlier sets, they can be seen depicted as a trio, alongside MC Renegade, reminiscent of their idols, the Donkey Rollers, who had MC DV8 as their full time MC. In 2009, they made their debut at Q-Dance's biggest events: Qlimax and Defqon.1. At Qlimax's 2009 edition, the producing duo can be seen alongside MC Renegade, although other Noisecontrollers performances from the same year, notably their Defqon.1 set, do not include Renegade.

=== 2009-10: Honing production skill, leaving Fusion Records ===
As the duo continued to work together, Oskam took a more leading role in the studio while Arjan focussed his efforts on performing on stage. With Oskam taking the lead, Noisecontrollers' production quality changed noticeably after he was invited to the Scantraxx studios to work with producers such as Project One duo Headhunterz and Wildstylez. Scantraxx later released their three-way collaboration, Headhunterz & Wildstylez vs. Noisecontrollers: "Tonight", in 2009. "Tonight" is one of the most celebrated tracks in the history of hardstyle music, with the track being ranked as the 2nd most popular hard dance song of all time in 2013. The 2012 Alpha^{2} remix of "Tonight" ranked as the 4th most popular hardstyle song of all time, during Q-Dance's 20th anniversary celebration party, Dediqated.

Q-Dance reached out to Noisecontrollers in 2009 and requested them to make the anthem for In Qontrol, an indoor hard dance festival held at the RAI in Amsterdam. The anthem which Oskam produced, titled after the 2009 edition's theme, "CTRL.ALT.DEL", is celebrated by producers and fans alike for its distinctive deep, crunchy kicks. In a 2020 interview, Oskam explained that the kick was pitch shifted down from the G key they normally used. He also explained that, while producing the song, he was trying to emulate the Donkey Rollers. Five years later, in 2014, Oskam confessed that he still used the kick developed for "CTRL.ALT.DEL" in many of his later productions.

Noisecontrollers were put in charge of creating the Decibel Outdoor anthem for the 2010 edition, naming their effort "Summer in the City". Later that same year, the duo debuted in DJ Mag's annual Top 100 DJs ranking at 90th, one place above compatriot hardstyle producer duo Showtek. At the very end of 2010, they left Fusion Records and founded the label "Digital:Age" with fellow hardstyle producer, Wildstylez, who had left from the Scantraxx main labels.

=== 2011-12: Digital:Age, Defqon.1 anthems, debut album ===
The duo collaborated with Wildstylez for the first two releases on Digital:Age, which was a Scantraxx sublabel, in early 2011. The same year, they were invited by Q-Dance to create the anthem for the Dutch edition of Defqon.1: "Unite", after making their debut at the festival only a two years prior. "Unite" was released by Q-Dance Records in August, and Noisecontrollers were also invited to play at the Australian edition of the festival, held in Sydney.

Throughout the year, they also began work on their debut album, and released several popular singles which would go on to feature on the album, including "Gimme Love", which achieved widespread popularity within the hardstyle scene. Oskam would go on to proclaim "Gimme Love" as the biggest Noisecontrollers hit song. They finished the year by moving up 55 places in the DJ Mag Top 100 DJs list, appearing at #35.

In January 2012, Q-Dance invited Noisecontrollers to the Heiniken Music Hall to feature in their very own event: X-Qlusive Noisecontrollers. "So High" was described by Oskam as the unofficial anthem for the event. This also marked the first time Q-Dance themed an event around a single artist with the X-Qlusive concept, which would continue on for over a decade. They continued 2012 by releasing their first album, titled E=Nc² (The Science Of Hardstyle). While working on the album, the duo made it clear they were spending time developing the concept, which was developed around the duo's shared interest in science. The album was assembled as a body of work, unlike many other albums from the hardstyle scene, which closer resemble compilations of singles. Oskam has claimed that the majority of the tracks on the album were produced by him alone, excluding The Pitcher collaboration "Knock Out".

Following the release of their debut album, the trio from "Tonight" re-emerged to produce their collaborative Defqon.1 anthem "World of Madness", for the Dutch edition of the festival. They finished 2012 moving further up the DJ Mag Top 100 charts, polling in 27th place.

=== 2013: Collaborations with Duos, Final Split ===
In January 2013, Scantraxx manager Rudy Peters issued a somewhat cryptic public announcement that Wildstylez (alongside Headhunterz and Frontliner) had departed from the label permanently, presumably ending the Digital:Age record label in which Noisecontrollers co-released their music upon. Oskam later revealed that Noisecontrollers and Wildstylez wanted to focus on brand building with Digital:Age, but eventually came to the conclusion that the exercise was a distraction from music production, and disbanded the project.

Nonetheless, Noisecontrollers continued to innovate their sound, releasing "Get Loose", a collaboration with Showtek, on Skrillex-owned label OWSLA. Previously, Showtek had departed from producing hardstyle to focus their efforts on more mainstream success, pivoting towards big room house. "Get Loose" features a combination of hardstyle, big-room, and screaming dubstep, a sound which Noisecontrollers claimed had an ongoing influence on their production. The track would receive an official remix from mainstream dance producer Tiësto, cementing its popularity. The year 2013 also saw Noisecontrollers return to Decibel anthem duties, releasing "Craving for the Beat", a collaboration with the Alpha^{2}. The anthem was released on the brothers' label, A2 Records (a sublabel of Scantraxx).

Noisecontrollers slid almost 40 places in the DJ Mag Top 100 poll for 2013, placing #66th.

Late in 2013, the duo announced that Terpstra had decided to step away from Noisecontrollers, with their last performance as a duo occurring a few days later at that year's edition of Qlimax. Terpstra cited the need to produce independently again, exploring other genres of dance music beyond the hard dance scene. In the YouTube statement announcing the split, the pair reminisce on the good times they've spent producing and performing together, open up about their uncertainties regarding the split (especially Oskam's ability to perform on his own), but remain adamant the split is the best thing for both individuals. They also talk about potentially reappearing together in the future, highlighting their ongoing friendship despite the split:

T: "And I hope I can climb on stage with you s—"

O: "Whenever you want, whenever you want, for sure!"

Since leaving Noisecontrollers, Terpstra (much akin to "Get Loose" collaborators Showtek) has been producing music using the stage name Bloqshot, focusing on different musical styles including big room house and dubstep.

=== 2014-15: First years solo ===
At Terpstra's departure set, Qlimax in November 2013, Noisecontrollers played a variety of new tracks, which, according to Oskam, were very well received by the hardstyle community. These tracks would go on to feature on Noisecontrollers second album, All Around. Following Terpstra's departure, Noisecontrollers spent a significant amount of time doing public relations work, such as interviews and guest mixes for a number of publications, to remind fans that he was now a solo artist. Interviews and guest mixes also gathered attention for All Around, which was released in March 2014 on Q-Dance Records. He described the album as having both a melodic and hard feel, with deeper kicks than he's ever produced before. He also emphasised the importance of hardstyle having a shifting sound, which he believed was occurring in the scene around the release of All Around. His personal favourite track from the album is "Down Down".

Noisecontrollers finished 2014 in almost the same position in the DJ Mag Top 100 Poll as he had as a duo the previous year, polling at 67th. It would also be his final year appearing in the Top 100 poll. He was also given the responsibility to produce the 2014 Qlimax anthem, "The Source Code of Creation".

Early in 2015, Noisecontrollers collaborated with Bass Modulators to release "Rocked Up" on Scantraxx, where Bass Modulators were treated as prospective talents. The collaborative pairing were unofficially given the shorthand NCBM, as is common amongst hardstyle acts. They later returned to collaborate on "Solar", a bright, melodic track with a striking saxophone melody, which was selected to be played at that year's edition of the Defqon.1 endshow. Following the success of these two tracks, NCBM promised more collaborative releases in the future.

Following the success of All Around, in 2015, a mysterious countdown timer appeared on Noisecontrollers official website in April 2015. Once the timer reached zero, a new compilation album, All Night Long (Collected Studio Material 2013-2015) was announced, and the title track "All Night Long" released as a single. The compilation featured assorted tracks and sounds from a variety of different genres, including Hardstyle, but also Dubstep and Progressive House. It was released in full as a purely digital release through his own record label, Noisecontrol Reocords, in June 2015.

Towards the end of 2015, Noisecontrollers released a documentary first through a theatre screening, and subsequently on YouTube, to commemorate a decade of the musical project. "10 Years Noisecontrollers" discussed the origins of the group, their split, and dedicates a significant amount of time discussing Oskam's production mindset and process. Accompanying the documentary was another album, his second of 2015, albeit primarily as a commemorative release documenting 129 previously released tracks. While most tracks were already officially released or appeared in his previous albums, there was some new material included.

=== 2016-17: NCBM, Spirit of Hardstyle ===
In January 2016, at Hard Bass in the GelreDome, NCBM performed a live act together for the first time. Before opening up their set, they started with a live saxophone soloist, who played the melody to their hit from the previous year, "Solar". Later in 2016, NCBM played their live act for a second time on the first day of Defqon.1, as Bass Modulators had produced the anthem for that years edition: "Dragonblood", entitling them to the first set of the festival. At the conclusion of this performance, the trio (Bass Modulators being a duo) announced they would be releasing a mini-album entitled Chapter One on Q-Dance Records. Chapter One was officially released a few weeks later, on the 15th of July, and marked Noisecontrollers fifth studio album in as many years.

Also at Defqon.1's 2016 edition, Noisecontrollers took a new creative turn and surprised the crowd by performing with a secret guest: electro-house DJ Sander van Doorn. They were introduced to each other via an industry connection at Q-Dance, and immediately bonded over their deep, independent and almost obsessive production styles. The pair used the opportunity to premiere their new collaboration, "Just Won't Get Enough", a hardstyle track. "Just Won't Get Enough" was released in early September. Following Defqon.1, Noisecontrollers admitted in an interview that he wasn't releasing as much music as before, but he felt it was a worthwhile to have a less packed release schedule in exchange for greater originality and innovation in his music.

Following 12 years of producing, 2017 saw Noisecontrollers announce his first classics set as part of a tour. The tour was named after his hit 2009 track, "Attack Again", whose riff features a sample of a trance melody from DJ Panda's 1994 track "Its A Dream". Throughout his career, Noisecontrollers has had a reputation for innovative and unique sampling. The classics tour started with two shows at Hard Fest and Supersized Kingsday, and continued with shows at festivals and clubs around the world.

Later in 2017, Noisecontrollers was recalled by B2S to produce a third Decibel Outdoor anthem; this time with Bass Modulators as NCBM. Shortly after this news was announced, the duo from NCBM, along with Atmozfears and Audiotricz, jointly announced "Spirit of Hardstyle", a brand new record label focussing on more melodic hardstyle sounds. On the day of the label launch, Noisecontrollers also released an eponymous track, which ended up finishing the year as one of the top 10 most popular hardstyle releases, following the release of the Q-Dance Top 100 2017 Voting Poll.

=== 2018-19: Final Hard Bass, Art of Creation ===
In the first fortnight of 2019, Noisecontrollers' was announced as the anthem maker of Hard Bass. His anthem, titled "The Last Formation", marked the end of a long chapter for B2S (the event's hosts), as the 2019 edition of Hard Bass was to be the last of the series of events. In an interview with B2S, Noisecontrollers talked about the planning and production process for the anthem, which took 3 weeks to make, as he strived to balance older and more contemporary hardstyle sounds to honour the legacy of the event. He also talked openly about his pleasure and relief with being the final Hard Bass anthem creator, as it was the last big anthem he wanted to check off his list.

On an Instagram Q&A in 2019, Noisecontrollers mentioned that the work of Sephyx impressed him, and that Sephyx's kick in "Wild Love" was his favourite kick at the time.

In late 2019, Noisecontrollers' hosted his own event: "Noisecontrollers and Friends" to celebrate 200 official releases. He was joined by friends and frequent collaborators within the hardstyle industry, including former label co-owner Wildstylez, label co-owners at the time Bass Modulators and Audiotricz, and Devin Wild. Fans also had the unique opportunity to see an NCBM live set. Around the same time, his record label merged into Art of Creation, and stopped using the Spirit of Hardstyle branding. Art of Creation was a record label founded by Project One duo and long time collaborators of Noisecontrollers, Headhunterz & Wildstylez, in early 2018. The trio specifically brought up their history of musical collaborations as a motivating factor for the merger.

=== 2020-Present: sabbatical, Harmony ===
In 2020, due to the COVID lockdowns, the Hardstyle scene was prohibited from hosting in person events, resulting in bookings for artists drying up. This resulted in many artists taking a natural break from the scene, including Noisecontrollers, who described the break after almost 15 years producing and travelling, as a "forced sabbatical". He took time away from producing and releasing music, releasing very few tracks. Out of the few tracks which he released at this time, one was a collaboration with Sephyx, whom he had previously praised. "Youngblood – (Luvenī)" was released in the middle of 2021, on the Art of Creation label.

Following the lifting of restrictions and the reemergence of live performances and hardstyle parties, Noisecontrollers experienced a variety of setbacks in his personal life, leaving him being unable to completely focus on making music.

2024 saw the return of NCBM, but as a classics act. They did not announce any plans to actively work in the studio together to create new music, but performed at classics shows such as XXLerator and Vroeger Was Alles Beter. Later that same year, Noisecontrollers announced a new musical project which would culminate in an album, Harmony. He mentioned that, while he had not released a new track in over two years at this point, he felt the hardstyle scene (particularly when it came to euphoric sounds) had remained relatively stagnant, and that it was time for more innovation. He also decided to revive the Spirit of Hardstyle label, showing faith in Art of Creation but also a desire to continue making music under a more controllable and distinct solo brand. "Harmony/Be Free EP" came out in November 2024, followed by a number of new releases, including a song which utilised 3D Audio effects, a collaboration with The Pitcher, and a remix from Ecstatic.

In 2026, fourteen years after its original release, E=Nc² (The Science Of Hardstyle) was made available in a vinyl release for the first time. Hard Bass has also announced a return, with Noisecontrollers featuring in the comeback edition as part of Team Blue. At the time of writing, and despite many new releases, Harmony has not yet been released as an album.

== Discography ==
=== Studio albums ===
The table below shows a list album titles and their details
Title	Album details	Peak chart positions
Title	Album details	NL
E=Nc² (The Science Of Hardstyle)	Released: 2 March 2012; Label: Scantraxx; Formats: CD, digital download	60
All Around	Released: 14 March 2014; Label: Q-dance Records; Formats: CD, digital download	43
All Night Long	Released: 22 April 2015; Label: Noisecontrol Records; Formats: CD, digital download	—
10 Years	Released: 12 December 2015; Label: Noisecontrol Records; Formats: CD, digital download	—
Chapter One (with Bass Modulators)	Released: 15 July 2016; Label: Headliner Music, Q-dance Records; Formats: CD, digital download	—

=== Compilation albums ===
Title	Album details
Qlimax 2014 the Source Code of Creation	Released: 21 November 2014; Label: Q-Dance Records; Formats: CD, digital download

=== Extended plays ===
Title	Album details
Creatures / Against All Odds	Released: 2 May 2007; Label: Fusion Records; Formats: vinyl, digital download
Crump / Marlboro Man / Aliens	Released: 21 September 2007; Label: Fusion Records; Formats: vinyl, digital download
Shreek / Venom / Rushroom	Released: 7 May 2008; Label: Fusion Records; Formats: vinyl, digital download
Ctrl.Alt.Delete (In Qontrol Anthem 2009)	Released: 3 April 2009; Label: Q-dance; Formats: vinyl, digital download
Tonight	Released: 29 May 2009; Label: Scantraxx Reloaded; Formats: vinyl, digital download
Yellow Minute / Sanctus / Revolution Is Here / Attack Again	Released: 1 June 2009; Label: Fusion Records; Formats: vinyl, digital download
Surge of Power Part 1	Released: 2 October 2009; Label: Fusion Records; Formats: vinyl, digital download
Surge of Power Part 2	Released: 2 October 2009; Label: Fusion Records; Formats: vinyl, digital download
Jaydee (featuring Toneshifterz)	Released: 22 March 2010; Label: Fusion Records; Formats: vinyl, digital download
Paranoid / Diffusion / Diavoli	Released: 20 May 2010; Label: Fusion Records; Formats: vinyl, digital download
Unite (Defqon.1 Festival 2011 Anthem)	Released: 9 Jun 2010; Label: Q-dance; Formats: vinyl, digital download
Faster 'n Further	Released: 16 August 2010; Label: Fusion Records; Formats: digital download
Bass Mechanics (with Psyko Punkz)	Released: 8 November 2010; Label: Fusion Records; Formats: digital download

=== Charted singles ===
Title	Year	Peak chart positions		Album
Title	Year	NL	BE	Album
"World of Madness" (with Headhunterz and Wildstylez)	2012	98	—	Non-album singles
"Get Loose" (with Showtek)	2013	32	79	Non-album singles
"—" denotes a single that did not chart or was not released in that territory.

=== Other singles ===
- "Das Boot" (with Atmozfears and B-Front) (2019)

== Awards and nominations ==
=== DJ Mag ===
==== Top 100 DJs Ranking ====
Position	Year	Movement	Source
90	2010	New entry	
35	2011	Up 55	
27	2012	Up 8	
66	2013	Down 39	
67	2014	Down 1	
107	2015	Down 40	
119	2016	Down 12	
―	2017	—N/a	
147	2018	Re-entry	
