= Scantraxx =

Dutch record label

SCANTRAXX
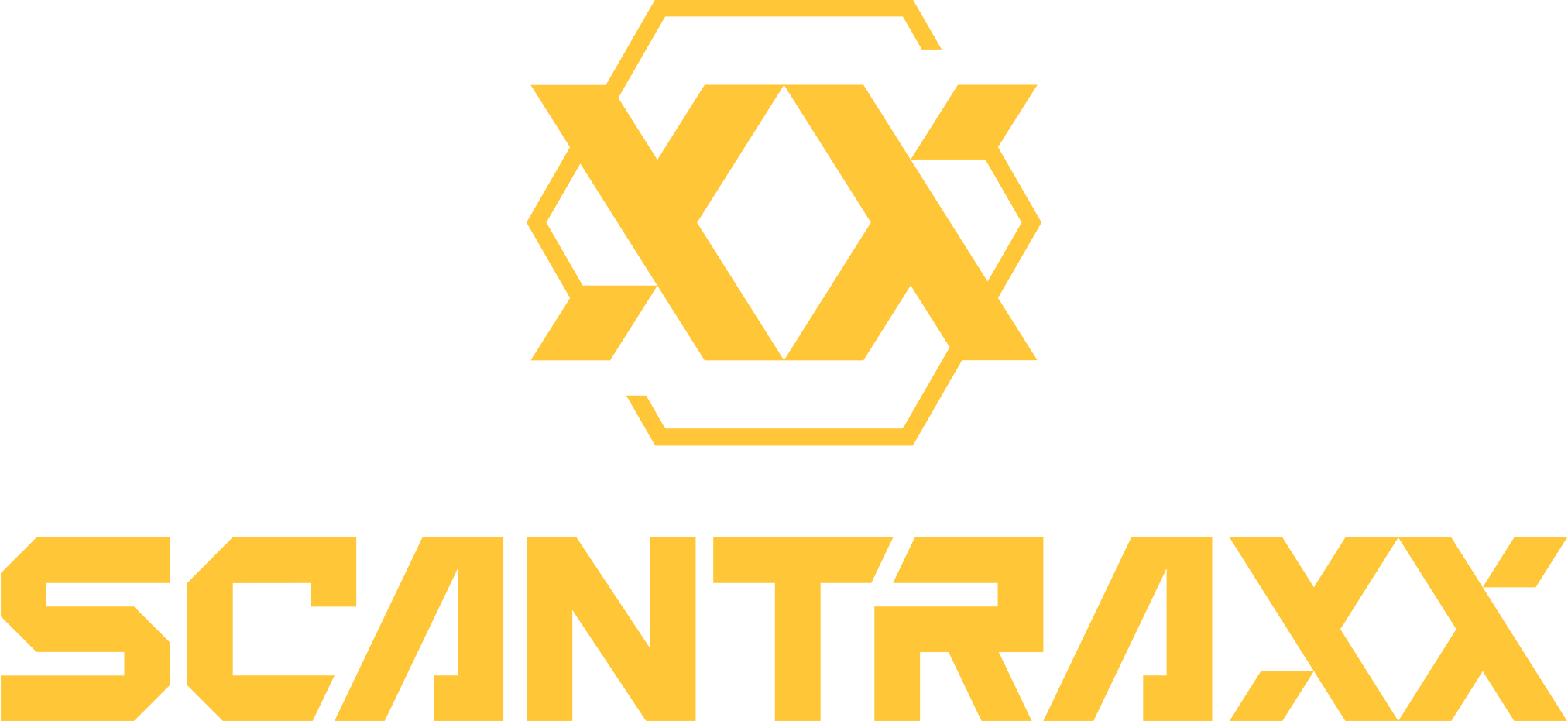
- New logo as 2024
- Founded: 2002
- Founder: Dov "The Prophet" Elkabas
- Genre: Hardstyle
- Country of origin: Netherlands
- Official website: https://www.scantraxx.com/

SCANTRAXX is a Dutch record label founded by Dov Elkabas (known as The Prophet) in 2002, specializing in both hardstyle and hardcore music.

== Labels ==
=== Active ===
- SCANTRAXX
- Scantraxx NEXXUS (Merged from both Silver and Carbon)
- Scantraxx PROSPEXX
- Roughstate
- Peacock Records (Sublabel of Dr Peacock)
- UNYFD
- Brutal Kaoz
- House of Madness (Sublabel of Da Mouth of Madness)
- SEVEN Records (Sublabel of E-Force)
- This Is Hardstyle (Sublabel of Frontliner)
- Italian Hardstyle (Sublabel of Zatox)

=== Inactive ===
- A² Records (Sublabel of Alpha², replaced by Scantraxx BLACK)
- Digital Age (label of Noisecontrollers & Wildstylez)
- Gold Records (formerly TiLLT Gold; Sublabel of Max Enforcer)
- M!D!FY (Sublabel of Brennan Heart; as well as M!D!FY Digital)
- Paint It Black
- Scantraxx BLACK
- Scantraxx Carbon
- Scantraxx Evolutionz (Sublabel of D-Block & S-te-Fan)
- Scantraxx Global
- Scantraxx Italy (Sublabel of Davide Sonar)
- Scantraxx Reloaded (Sublabel of Headhunterz)
- Scantraxx Special
- Scantraxx Silver
- ScantraXXL
- Squaretraxx (Sublabel of Ruthless)
- Unleashed Records (Sublabel of Digital Punk)
- X-Bone (former talent label)
- X-Raw (former RAW talent label)

== Artists ==
=== Currently ===
==== Scantraxx (including former BLACK / CARBON sublabel) ====
- ANDY SVGE
- A-RIZE
- Adrenalize
- Bass Modulators (aka BASS X MACHINA)
- D-Block & S-te-fan (aka Ghost Stories)
- Demi Kanon
- Devin Wild
- Digital Punk
- Disarray
- DJ Isaac
- The Prophet
- E-Force
- ERABREAK
- JDX
- KELTEK
- Lady Faith
- Level One
- Nightcraft
- Thyron
- Zatox

==== Scantraxx NEXXUS ====
- Brutalizer
- Flux Overload
- KidEast
- Mirage
- Inflame

==== Roughstate ====
- Adaro
- B-Front
- Gunz For Hire (Adaro & Ran-D)
- Rejecta
- Frequencerz
- Wolv

=== Former / Inactive ===
- 2-Sidez (B-Front & DJ Pulse)
- A-lusion (Lussive Music)
- The Anarchist (inactive)
- Amentis
- Arkaine (inactive)
- Artic (inactive)
- Airtunes (now Broken Element)
- Audiofreq (own label Audiophetamine)
- Audiotricz (Art of Creation, now I Am Hardstyle)
- Atmozfears
- Beat Providers (E-Force & Roy van Schie; inactive)
- BENGR (inactive)
- Bioweapon (Code Black & Audiofreq)
- Black Identity (The Prophet & JDX)
- Blademasterz (Brennan Heart)
- BMBSQD (inactive)
- Brennan Heart (I Am Hardstyle)
- Brennan & Heart (Brennan Heart & DJ Thera)
- Bright Visions (now ONYX)
- Charger
- Crossfight (inactive)
- Clive King
- Davide Sonar (inactive)
- Dirk-Jan DJ (now DJ Duro)
- Divinez
- Deetox
- DJ Duro (50% of Showtek, solo act inactive)
- Dopeman (The Prophet)
- Energyzed (alias resigned)
- Envine
- F8trix (inactive)
- Festuca (now Jesse Jax)
- Gostosa (Gostosa performed in stage, Headhunterz produced the music)
- Hardheadz (The Prophet & Pavo)
- Hard Attakk (The Prophet)
- Headhunterz (Art of Creation)
- Headliner (now Showtek)
- Herculez On Dope (inactive)
- Imperatorz (now Big K)
- JNXD (Dirty Workz)
- Krusaders (inactive)
- Kronos
- Max B. Grant (ETX Records)
- Max Enforcer
- Neroz (inactive)
- Outsiders (Wildstylez & Alpha²)
- Pavo (inactive)
- Pherato (Dirty Workz)
- Project One (Headhunterz & Wildstylez, own Label Art of Creation)
- Requiem (now Boray)
- REVIVE
- Rogue Zero (Heard For Hard)
- Ruthless (FVCK GENRES)
- RVAGE (Minus Is More)
- S-Dee (inactive)
- Scope DJ (inactive)
- SMD (50% of Noisecontrollers, solo act inactive)
- Second Identity (A-lusion & Scope DJ; inactive)
- Seizure (Wildstylez & Ruben Hooyer)
- Shockerz (now Aftershock)
- Stephanie
- Supaboyz (now Zatox)
- Sylenth & Glitch (A-lusion & Jones)
- Taq 9 (The Prophet & DJ Gizmo)
- The Masochist (The Prophet)
- The R3belz (inactive)
- Unknown Analoq (Brennan Heart)
- Wasted Penguinz (Dirty Workz)
- Waveliner (inactive)
- Waverider (ANDY SVGE)
- Wildstylez (Art of Creation)
