= Airbeat One =

Electronic music festival in Neustadt-Glewe, Germany

- Genre: Electronic dance music
- Dates: Mid-July
- Locations: Airfield – Neustadt-Glewe, Germany
- Coordinates: 53°21′38″N 11°36′59″E
- Years active: 2002–present
- Attendance: 210,000 (2023)
- Organiser: Airbeat One GmbH
- Website: airbeat-one.de

Airbeat One is a large-scale annual electronic dance music festival held at Neustadt-Glewe, Germany. It is especially known for its show concept, which features a different country theme every year. In 2023, the festival recorded around 210,000 visitors. Therefore, it is one of the largest festivals of its kind in Germany and Europe.

Location within Germany

== History ==
=== First projects ===
The very first edition of the EDM festival took place in 2002 at the airfield in Neustadt-Glewe. It was launched under the name Airbase One by the event technology company Music Eggert, also known as ME-Events. Following the first edition, which drew around 1,000 visitors, plans were made to hold the event annually. For trademark reasons, the festival was renamed Airbeat One for its third edition. In 2007, the festival took place at a lake near Neu Zachun.

=== Musical Classification and Development ===
The music style was initially very trance-oriented, but over time, this genre became less prominent at Airbeat One. As a result, additional stages were set up, each focusing on a specific genre. These include genres such as electro-house, hardstyle, techno, drum ’n’ bass and psytrance. In 2010, a main stage was erected for the first time to showcase renowned artists across all genres on a single main stage. While there were eleven stages the following year, this number was quickly reduced, and the focus shifted to the most important stages. In particular, the styles electro-house, hardstyle, and psytrance came to the forefront. From 2009 to 2013, the event was opened each Thursday by newcomer DJs from the non-profit organization Coreplex e. V. in the camping area, while since 2014, the first DJs have been playing on a stage in the VIP area on Wednesdays.

In 2015, the Sony Music subsidiary “Electronic Dance” or “Club Sounds” produced documentary films and interviews with a number of artists.

=== Since 2016: A sudden surge in popularity ===
In 2016, the festival celebrated its 15th anniversary and set a new record with approximately 40,000 daily visitors. In addition, the organizer Q-Dance operated its own stage.The lineup for this stage was particularly dominated by hardstyle artists. Well-known hardstyle DJs with a much higher profile were secured. Among them were D-Block & S-te-Fan, Noisecontrollers, Brennan Heart, Wasted Penguinz, Da Tweekaz, Bass Modulators, and Audiotricz, as well as returning acts Coone, Code Black, and Atmozfears. In addition, the Airbeat One team announced that the entire lineup for this edition would be significantly larger than in previous years. Over 40 acts performed on a stage set up at nearby Barracuda Beach.

In 2017, attendance increased by another 5,000 visitors. With the performance by Dutch DJ Hardwell, another major figure in the EDM scene made his debut at the festival. Timmy Trumpet and Headhunterz were also secured for the main stage. Both had enjoyed great success the previous year and performed on the main stage for the first time. The Q-Dance Stage featured various B2B (“back-to-back”) performances, a first for the festival; among others, Ran-D and Atmozfears, as well as Angerfist and Partyraiser, shared the stage together.

In 2018, the festival grounds opened as early as Wednesday. Separate tickets were sold for the so-called pre-opening party. Within a few days, over 60% of the tickets were sold out. The headliners for this party were Nicky Romero, Blasterjaxx, and Bassjackers. The pre-opening for the main artists took place on the newly constructed stage “The Arena,” hosted by the record labels “Boombox” and “Transmission.” The camping grounds were also fully booked before advance ticket sales had even ended. With a total of over 55,000 visitors, a new attendance record was set. In addition, the 17th edition saw the introduction of the so-called cashless payment system for the first time, which relies on cashless transactions. With acts like Zedd, Marshmello, and DJ Snake, the musical styles represented on the main stage were expanded to include, among others, complextro, dubstep, and trap.

In 2019, with around 65,000 attendees, the festival celebrated the theme “A Journey to India” in front of a main stage modeled after the Taj Mahal. The performance by Dutch DJ and producer Martin Garrix and the closing set by Timmy Trumpet, followed by fireworks, were two highlights of the festival. In addition, the American duo The Chainsmokers made their debut at the Airbeat One Festival. Outside the festival grounds, the cashless payment system was retained, and a new attraction was introduced with the option of a skydiving experience.

On April 16, 2020, the organizers, Music Eggert, announced that the planned 19th edition of the Airbeat One Festival, originally scheduled for July 8–12, 2020, would be canceled due to the spread of the COVID-19 pandemic. The theme “A Journey to Italy,” which was to take place in 2020, was accordingly postponed to 2021. In August 2021, the festival was canceled again and rescheduled for July 6–10, 2022. The reason was, once again, the ongoing COVID-19 pandemic.

In July 2022, the festival took place again following the ongoing pandemic. The festival set a new Germany-wide record, bringing 37 DJs from DJ Mag’s Top 100 ranking to the stages. The pre-opening on Wednesday drew 20,000 visitors. On the final day, the number reached 65,000. A total of 200,000 visitors from over 50 countries traveled to the 19th edition of the festival.

== Organization ==
The site is located at the airfield in Neustadt-Glewe, Mecklenburg-Western Pomerania, right off the A24 Hamburg-Berlin highway. In addition to the six stages, the grounds include a spacious camping area. The event site features several medical stations for rapid first aid as well as a police station.

For those traveling by public transportation, several long-distance bus routes are available in addition to train connections. Several free shuttle bus routes are available for transfers from the day visitor parking lot or for trips into the town of Neustadt-Glewe as well as to a nearby swimming lake.

=== Camping Area ===
The campground is divided into VIP, Main, Special, Easy, and North camping areas, most of which have their own restroom facilities. You can also rent portable toilets, lockers, and power banks.

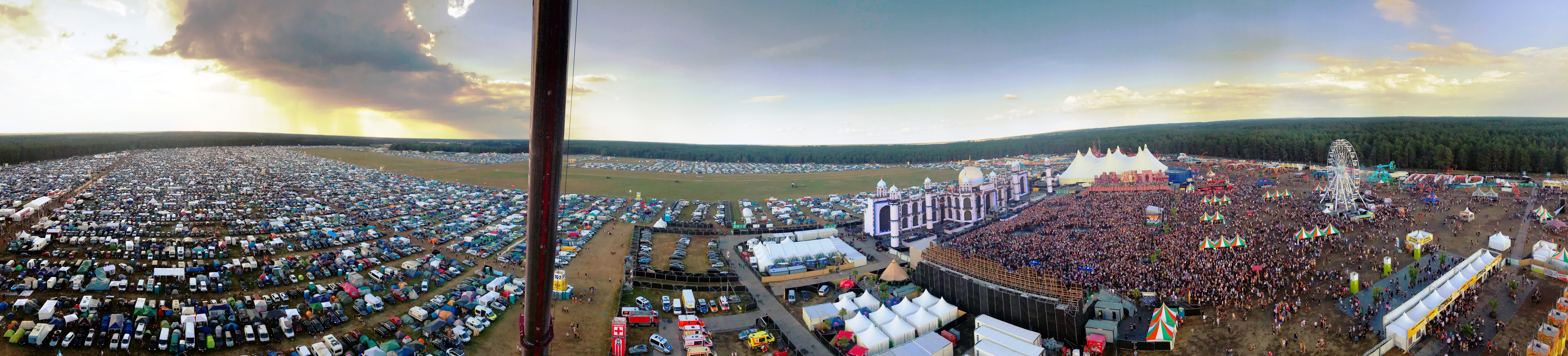
Aerial view of parts of the campground and main stage, 2019

=== Festival Area ===
==== Main Stage ====
The Main Stage features internationally renowned DJs from various EDM genres. Additionally, the Main Stage hosts a large-scale pyrotechnic and lighting show, which includes the main fireworks display on the night from Saturday to Sunday. This typically begins around 1:30 a.m.Stylistically, the Main Stage is themed to match the festival's annual motto.

==== Harder Stage ====
Since 2016, the stage featuring hardstyle has been hosted by the music promoter and record label Q-Dance (organizer of Defqon.1 and Q-Base, among others). This stage also receives a new design every year, with motifs from the animal kingdom usually serving as inspiration. In addition to classic hardstyle acts, DJs from the rawstyle and hardcore genres also perform here. The Harder Stage is the second-largest stage on the grounds and also features a large repertoire of pyrotechnics, which is why an additional large-scale fireworks display takes place there on Sunday as well.

==== Second Stage ====
The Second Stage features psychedelic trance music. The dance floor is covered by a large, colorful sunshade. In keeping with the musical theme, the stage is decorated with psychedelic design elements.

==== Arena Stage ====
The Arena Stage has been in existence since 2018. It is primarily focused on techno genres and takes place inside a large tent measuring approximately 5,000 m² with space for about 7,000 people. The stage is decorated with a design typical of the country in line with the annual theme.

==== Terminal Stage ====
The Terminal Stage primarily features genres such as electro, tech house, and tropical house. The Terminal Stage is located inside a large tent identical in construction to the Arena Stage.

==== Butterfly Stage ====
Introduced in 2024 as the “Classic Stage,” the Butterfly Stage is another stage. It primarily features DJ acts that gained widespread fame in earlier years. The focus is on sets featuring the particularly successful tracks from that very era.

==== The Face ====
Acts primarily from the melodic techno and house genres, including tech-house, perform on this stage, which was introduced in 2026. The Face is the only stage not located directly on the main grounds. The stage is situated in an immediately adjacent wooded area and is accessible from the main grounds via a bridge.

==== Groove Castle ====
This stage, also built for the first time in 2026, is primarily dedicated to the genres of groove techno, progressive club sounds, and a cross-genre mix of house and trance.

==== The Cube ====
Launched in 2026, The Cube is a stage dedicated specifically to techno, schranz, euphoric hardstyle, and other harder styles.

== Discography ==
Together with Ronny Bibow, German producer Michael Bein—who performed on the main stage as Money G nearly every year from the first edition until 2014—founded the “Airbeat One Project” in 2004. Under this pseudonym, a series of songs in the progressive trance genre were released in the following years. In 2012, Bein revived the project on his own, and several more singles were released through 2013, though these were much more aligned with the hands-up and electro-house genres. In 2015, the first compilation was released, featuring a total of 40 tracks by various artists. From 2015 to 2017, the official anthem was produced by German producer Andrew Bennett.The following year, German musician Luca River, alias Fluex, took over this role.

Since 2009, aftermovies of the festival have been released annually. While the first aftermovie was just under 6 minutes long and the following year's version featured only 4 minutes of footage, the aftermovies from 2015 and 2016 were over 10 minutes long. In 2022, they were over 15 minutes long.

=== Compilations ===
- 2015: Airbeat One 2015 (Kontor Records)
- 2016: Airbeat One 2016 (Kontor Records)
- 2017: Airbeat One 2017 (Kontor Records)
- 2018: Airbeat One 2018 (Kontor Records)
- 2019: Airbeat One 2019 (Kontor Records)

=== Singles ===
- 2004: Airbeat One
- 2006: Airbeat One 2006
- 2009: Airbeat One 2009
- 2012: Airbeat Army
- 2012: Turn Up the Party
- 2013: Snowbeat
- 2016: Under A Night Sky (feat. Kyler England)
- 2017: Won’t Come Down (feat. Pearl Andersson)

=== Anthems ===
- 2010: Luca Bressan – Rose Garden
- 2012: Mystery & Creek – Airbeat One 2012
- 2013: Danny Ávila – Voltage
- 2014: Jewelz & Sparks – Kingdom
- 2015: Andrew Bennett feat. Angelika Vee – Fall Out
- 2016: Airbeat Inc. feat Kyler England – Under A Night Sky
- 2017: Airbeat Inc. feat. Pearl Andersson – Won’t Come Down
- 2018: Fluex – Daylight
- 2019: Airbeat Inc. – Run with You
- 2024: Neelix feat. The Hitmen – The Unknown

== Offshoots ==
Since the mid-2000s, the Indian Spirit Festival has been organized by Music Eggert. For several years now, it has been held in the small town of Eldena near Ludwigslust. The festival's theme and musical focus lean toward psychedelic trance, featuring acts such as Liquid Soul, Neelix, and Fabio & Moon. Psytrance DJ Schrittmacher is part of the festival's organizing team. In 2018, the festival attracted over 8,000 visitors.[27]

In 2012, the so-called Snowbeat Festival took place for the first time, also organized by Music Eggert. Since then, it has been held at the winter sports hall in Wittenburg, Mecklenburg-Western Pomerania[28] and also features house, psychedelic trance, hardstyle, and deep house music. The lineup also shows parallels to Airbeat One. 4,000 tickets were sold in 2016.

As part of the festival, the organizers have been organizing so-called “club tours” since 2014, during which a variety of Airbeat One headliners perform at various clubs located throughout Germany. Particular attention is paid to representing different music genres, which is why these events are typically held at clubs that feature these different genres on separate stages. [29]

Since 2015, the Electric Sea Dance Festival has been held every December, which also specializes in similar music genres. However, the festival takes place over just one day at the HanseMesse grounds in Rostock.[30] Around 4,000 visitors attended the festival in 2016.

== Trivia ==
- An accident occurred during the setup of the Airbeat One 2014. A technician fell 18 meters while working on the lighting system. He died in the hospital.
- For several years now, each edition of the festival has been based on a new theme:
  - 2014: The World of the Maya
  - 2015: Ancient Rome
  - 2016: A Journey to Asia
  - 2017: A Journey to the USA
  - 2018: A Journey to Great Britain
  - 2019: A Journey to India
  - 2022: A Journey to Italy
  - 2023: Home Edition – Germany
  - 2024: A Journey to France
  - 2025: A Journey to Spain
  - 2026: Welkom in Nederland – The Home of Electronic Music!

== See also ==
- List of electronic music festivals
- Live electronic music
