= Outbreak (DJ) =

Australian DJ

- Also known as: NitrouZ
- Born: 27 December 1984 (age 41)
- Origin: Sydney, Australia
- Genres: Hardstyle, Hard Dance, Raw Hardstyle
- Years active: 2002–present
- Labels: Dutch Master Works, WE R Music, Fusion Records
- Website: http://www.djoutbreakmusic.com/

John-Paul Pirrello (born 27 December 1984; in Sydney, Australia), known onstage as Outbreak, is an Australian DJ and music producer. Since 2002, he has been active in producing and performing hard dance music, specifically hardstyle since 2002.

== Biography ==
In his initial years, JP Pirrello performed under the name NitrouZ and released tracks "City Bitch", "Crazy Music" with DJ Duro and "Lonely Dark" with Zany, which were picked up among many fans worldwide. During these years, he released his music on a number of labels including Dutch Master Works and Fusion Records. As NitrouZ, Pirrello performed at many parties in Australia and The Netherlands such as Defqon.1 Festival, Dance Valley, Q-Dance: The Next Level, X-Qlusive Showtek, Q-BASE, Euphoria and many more.

In 2013, the alias NitrouZ was discontinued and Pirrello re-launched himself as Outbreak, signing to Brennan Heart's record label, WE R Music and representing its sub-label WE R Raw. Outbreak quickly established himself in the Hardstyle scene by releasing popular tracks "A New Today," "Get The Mean" with DV8 Rocks!, his official remix of Adaro's "Hit You With That Bang Shit" and "#Bassface," which gained over 500,000 plays in total on YouTube.

Outbreak has had many performances in some of the biggest venues in The Netherlands including the Ziggo Dome, Heineken Music Hall, Jaarbeurs (Utrecht), GelreDome and the Brabanthallen as well as many outdoor venues. Since beginning the Outbreak project, JP has performed at some of the biggest Hard dance events such as Hard Bass, Defqon.1 (Australia and The Netherlands), Qapital, Masters of Hardcore, Decibel Outdoor Festival, The Qontinent, Q-BASE and many other large-scale events run by leading companies Q-Dance, Bass Events and b2s.

== Discography ==
Name	Artist(s)	Label	Year
Maximum Force – Official Defqon.1 Anthem 2009(NitrouZ Remix)	Zany	Q-dance Records	2009
Crazy Music	NitrouZ & DJ Duro	Dutch Master Works	2010
Hardstyle Defines You	NitrouZ	Dutch Master Works	2010
Tha BiDniZ	NitrouZ & Toneshifterz	Dutch Master Works	2010
Origins of Life	NitrouZ & Toneshifterz	Fusion Records	2010
City Bitch	NitrouZ	Dutch Master Works	2010
Rhythm of Our Hearts	NitrouZ	Fusion Records	2011
Lonely Dark	NitrouZ & Zany	Fusion Records	2011
Turn Up The Volume	NitrouZ	Dutch Master Works	2011
Insane	Abyss & Judge vs NitrouZ	Dutch Master Works	2011
The Faithless	NitrouZ & Toneshifterz	Dutch Master Works	2011
Can't Hold Me Back	Code Black & NitrouZ	Fusion Records	2012
Shadows of the Day	Digital Punk & NitrouZ	TiLLT!	2012
Party On!	NitrouZ & Slim Shore	Fusion Records	2012
Conquer Your Fears	NitrouZ	Fusion Records	2012
A New Today	Outbreak	WE R Music	2013
Survival	Outbreak	WE R Music	2013
Get The Mean	Outbreak feat. DV8 Rocks!	WE R	2013
Hit You With That Bang Shit (Outbreak Remix)	Adaro	A2 Records	2014
The Nightmare Factory	Outbreak	WE R	2014
F.I.F.O (Outbreak Remix)	Brennan Heart	WE R	2014
We Want Your Soul (WWYS)	Outbreak	WE R	2014
#Bassface	Outbreak	WE R Raw	2014
Prison of Commercializm	Digital Punk & Outbreak	WE R Raw	2014
WE R Hardstyle Yearmix 2014	Code Black, Brennan Heart & Outbreak	WE R	2014
It's On	Outbreak	WE R Raw	2015
Get The Mean (Rough Edit)	Outbreak feat. DV8 Rocks!	WE R Raw	2015
Brain Smacker	Outbreak	WE R Raw	2015
Wake Up	Outbreak & Kronos	Unite Records	2015
You With Me	Radical Redemption & Outbreak	Minus Is More	2015
Rebel Territory	Outbreak featuring. Cuntmafia	WE R Raw	2016
Raw From The Heart	Outbreak	WE R Raw	2016
Click Clack	Kronos & Outbreak	WE R Raw	2016
Sounds of the Night	Outbreak	WE R Raw	2016
Let Go	Outbreak & Toneshifterz	WE R	2016
Blackout (Ground Zero Anthem 2016)	Outbreak	WE R Raw	2016
