= I Am Hardstyle =

Dutch record label

- Founded: 2013 (as WE R Music)
- Founder: Fabian Bohn (Brennan Heart)
- Genre: Hardstyle
- Country of origin: Netherlands
- Official website: Official Website

I Am Hardstyle (previously known as WE R Music) is a Dutch record label which produces hardstyle. The label was founded in 2013 by Fabian Bohn, better known by his stage name, Brennan Heart.

== Artists ==
Artists currently associated with I Am Hardstyle/ WE R Music:

- ANDY SVGE
- Audiotricz
- Brennan Heart
- Blademasterz
- Code Black
- Concept Art (I Am Hardstyle Amplify, previously WE R Music/Detailed Traxx)
- Dailucia
- Deetox (previously on Scantraxx)
- Digital Madness
- Rebourne
- The Pitcher
- TAC Team (project of Toneshifterz, Atmozfears, and Code Black)
- Toneshifterz
- Wildfyre
- Xense (I Am Hardstyle Amplify, previously X-Bone/Detailed Traxx)
- Zero Days (I Am Hardstyle Amplify, previously Detailed Traxx)

Artists previously associated with I Am Hardstyle/ WE R Music:

- Aftershock (WE R Music/I Am Hardstyle, now Art of Creation)
- Aztech (WE R Tomorrow)
- Clockartz (I Am Hardstyle, now True Identity)
- Crisis Era (WE R Tomorrow, now Detailed Traxx)
- Firelite (WE R Music, now Dirty Workz)
- Final Form (WE R Music)
- Focuz (WE R Tomorrow)
- Galactixx (WE R Music, now Roughstate)
- Outbreak (WE R Raw)
- Sub Sonik (WE R Raw, now Dirty Workz)
- The Vision (WE R Music)
- TWSTD (WE R Raw, still active)
- Thyron (WE R Raw/I Am Hardstyle, now Scantraxx)
- Uncaged (WE R Raw, now RSLVD Records)

== Releases ==
=== As WE R Music ===
| Artist | Title(s) | Year | (Sub) Label |
|---|---|---|---|
| Code Black | Brighter Day | 2013 | WE R |
| Toneshifterz (feat. Chris Madin) | Last Night | 2013 | WE R |
| Code Black | R.E.V.O.L.U.T.I.O.N. | 2013 | WE R |
| Outbreak | A New Today | 2013 | WE R |
| Brennan Heart | F.I.F.O. | 2013 | WE R |
| Toneshifterz | Power Of Emotion | 2013 | WE R |
| Code Black | I.N. C.O.N.T.R.O.L | 2013 | WE R |
| Brennan Heart (feat. Jonathan Mendelsohn) | Imaginary | 2013 | WE R |
| Outbreak | Survival | 2013 | WE R |
| Toneshifterz | R.A.W. Power | 2013 | WE R |
| Code Black | Feels Good | 2013 | WE R |
| Toneshifterz | All On Me / Leap Of Faith | 2013 | WE R |
| Outbreak (feat. DV8 Rocks) | Get The Mean | 2013 | WE R |
| Code Black | Pandora | 2013 | WE R |
| Brennan Heart (& Zatox) | Fight The Resistance | 2013 | WE R |
| Brennan Heart | Never Break Me (Toneshifterz Remix) | 2014 | WE R |
| Outbreak | The Nightmare Factory | 2013 | WE R |
| Code Black & Brennan Heart | Tonight Wil Never Die | 2014 | WE R |
| Toneshifterz | I Want To Party | 2014 | WE R |
| Code Black (& Atmozfears) | Accelerate (Official XXlerator Anthem 2014) | 2014 | WE R |
| Brennan Heart | Evolution Continues | 2014 | WE R |
| Toneshifterz (feat. Zuri Akoko) | Feel The Energy | 2014 | WE R |
| Code Black (& Atmozfears) | Starting Over | 2014 | WE R |
| Toneshifterz (feat. Chris Madin) | Parachutes | 2014 | WE R |
| Brennan Heart | We Come & We Go (EOS Mix) | 2014 | WE R |
| Outbreak | We Want Your Soul (WWYS) | 2014 | WE R |
| Brennan Heart (& Shanokee) | Wide Awake (EOS Mix) | 2014 | WE R |
| Brennan Heart | F.I.F.O. (Outbreak Remix) | 2014 | WE R |
| Crisis Era | Loud | 2014 | WE R |
| Outbreak | #Bassface | 2014 | WE R Raw |
| Aztech | Valhalla | 2014 | WE R Tomorrow |
| The Resistance | Hypnose | 2014 | WE R Tomorrow |
| Toneshifterz (feat. Zuri Akoko) | What We Live For | 2014 | WE R |
| Outbreak & Digital Punk | Prison of Commercializm | 2014 | WE R Raw |
| Code Black & Brennan Heart | Tonight Will Never Die (Audiotricz Remix) | 2014 | WE R |
| Brennan Heart, Code Black & Outbreak | WE R Yearmix 2014 | 2014 | WE R (CD) |
| Aztech (feat. Nikkita) | The Tribe (2014 Mix) | 2014 | WE R Tomorrow |
| Crisis Era | What I'm About | 2014 | WE R Raw |
| Brennan Heart | Outta My Way | 2014 | WE R |
| Code Black | Draw Me Closer | 2014 | WE R |
| Sub Sonik | Look At Me Now | 2014 | WE R Raw |
| Focuz | What | 2015 | WE R Tomorrow |
| Outbreak | It's On | 2015 | WE R Raw |
| Brennan Heart (& Jonathan Mendelsohn) | Follow The Light | 2015 | WE R |
| Code Black (& Chris Madin) | New World | 2015 | WE R |
| Aztech | This Moment | 2015 | WE R Tomorrow |
| Crisis Era | Make It Pop | 2015 | WE R |
| Brennan Heart & Toneshifterz (& DV8 Rocks!) | My Identity | 2015 | WE R |
| Focuz | Stay | 2015 | WE R |
| Sub Sonik | Go Fuck Yourself | 2015 | WE R Raw |
| Brennan Hearrt | Hardbass Junkie (Digital Punk Remix) | 2015 | WE R Raw |
| Atlas | Stay Forever | 2015 | WE R Tomorrow |
| Brennan Heart | Outta My Way (Remixes) | 2015 | WE R Raw |
| Dailucia | Rawphoria | 2015 | WE R |
| Outbreak (feat. DV8 Rocks!) | Get The Mean (Rough Edit) | 2015 | WE R Raw |
| Code Black & Wasted Penguinz feat. Insali | End Like This | 2015 | WE R |
| Outbreak | Brain Smacker | 2015 | WE R Raw |
| Low-E & Zero Sanity | Broken Record | 2015 | WE R |
| Sub Sonik | Fuck Y'All If You Doubt Me | 2015 | WE R Raw |
| Brennan Heart & Wildstylez | Lies Or Truth | 2015 | WE R |
| The Vision ft. Melissa Pixel | WE R One | 2015 | WE R |
| Code Black & Toneshifterz | Kick It Up Now | 2015 | WE R |
| Crisis Era | Come On | 2015 | WE R |
| Galactixx | Hold Me | 2015 | WE R |
| Sub Sonik | GO! (Welcom To My World) | 2015 | WE R Raw |
| Code Black | Triangle | 2015 | WE R |
| The Vision & Zentiments | Relax | 2015 | WE R |
| Code Black | Predator | 2015 | WE R |
| Toneshifterz | Music Takes Me | 2015 | WE R |
| Galactixx | Hold Me | 2016 | WE R |
| The Vision Ft. LNYX | Follow Your Heart | 2016 | WE R |
| Sub Sonik | M.F. Psycho | 2016 | WE R Raw |
| Brennan Heart & Zatox | God Complex | 2016 | WE R |
| Crisis Era | Killin It | 2016 | WE R Raw |
| Outbreak | Raw From The Heart EP | 2016 | WE R Raw |
| Ruthless | Funky Beats | 2016 | WE R |
| Brennan Heart & Audiotricz Ft. Criston | Coming Home | 2016 | WE R |
| Toneshifterz Ft. John Harris | How Could It Be (Hardstyle Mix) | 2016 | WE R |
| Sub Sonik & Sub Zero Project | Raise Your Fist | 2016 | WE R Raw |
| The Vision | Melody Madness | 2016 | WE R |
| Outbreak | Rebel Territory EP II | 2016 | WE R Raw |
| Toneshifterz & DVerse | Back With A Vengeance | 2016 | WE R |
| TWSTD Ft. MC I SEE | Twisted Fuck! | 2016 | WE R Raw |
| Bioweapon | Reload The Weapon EP | 2016 | WE R |
| Toneshifterz & Outbreak | Let Go | 2016 | WE R |
| TWSTD | I'll Fuck You Up | 2016 | WE R Raw |
| Crisis Era | Party Up | 2016 | WE R |
| Aztech & NSCLT | Down Tonight | 2016 | WE R |
| Outbreak | Blackout (Official Ground Zero 2016 Anthem) | 2016 | WE R Raw |
