= Code Black (DJ) =

Australian DJ

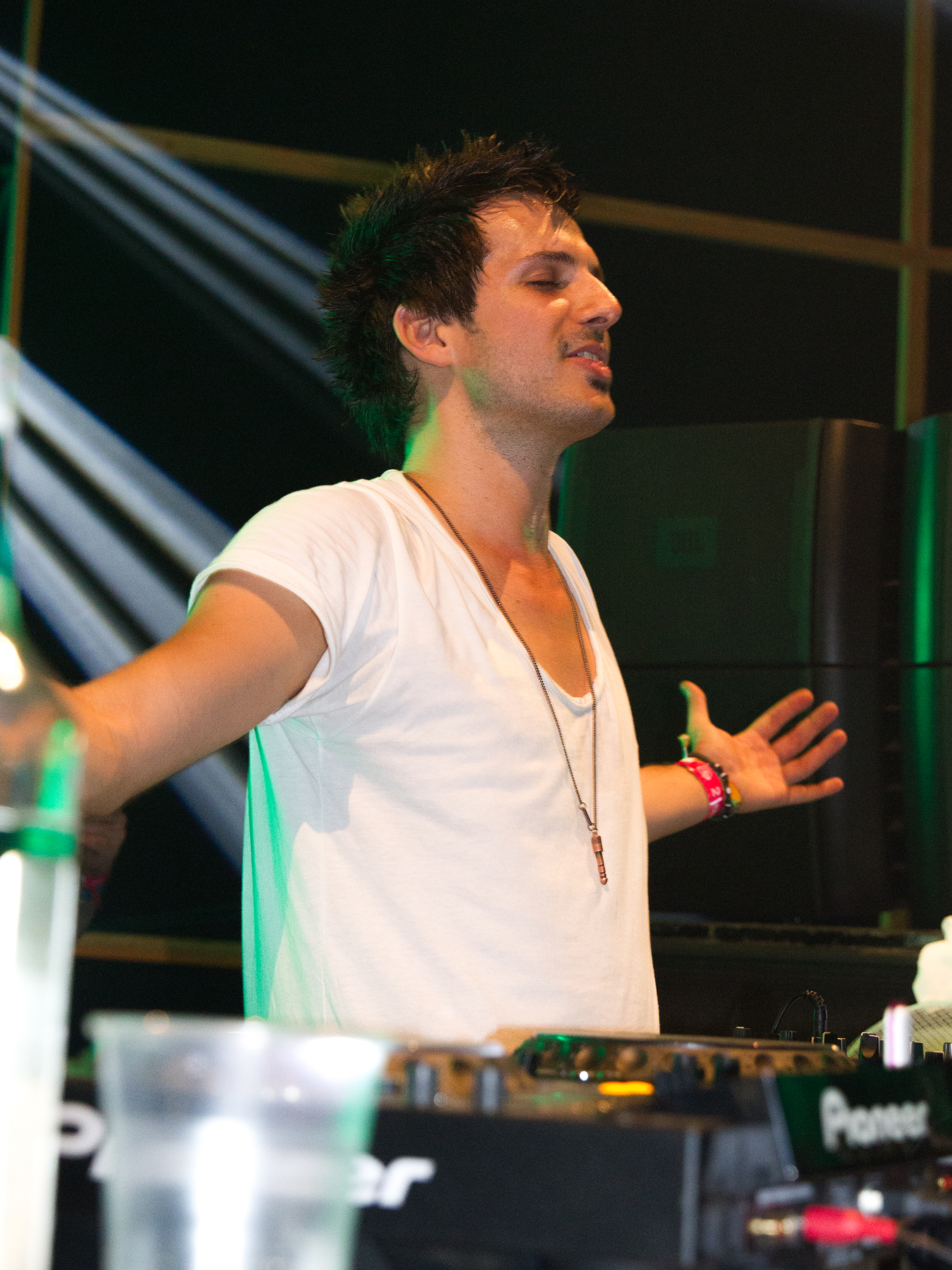
- Corey Soljan at Airbeat One 2015

Background information
- Also known as: Code Black
- Born: Corey Soljan; 1987 (age 38–39); Sydney, Australia
- Origin: Australia
- Genre: Hardstyle
- Occupations: DJ; record producer; remixer
- Instruments: Piano; keyboards; mixer; synthesizer
- Years active: 2011-present
- Label: WE R Music
- Member of: Bioweapon
- Website: CodeBlackMedia.nl

Corey Soljan (born 1987), better known by his artistic name Code Black, is an Australian hardstyle-DJ and music producer.

As a member of the act Bioweapon, along with Audiofreq, he travelled the world. Finding success in the Netherlands, he began a solo career stopping his duo act in 2011. He has played at various events including Mysteryland, Tomorrowland, HardBass, Decibel, Euphoria and both of the Defqon.1 music festivals held in The Netherlands and Australia. He mainly produces and plays euphoric hardstyle tracks, but also produces and plays some rawstyle tracks.

== Career ==
=== 2008-2011: Rise of Bioweapon, Subsequent Split ===
Corey Soljan met Sam Gonzalez in Sydney in the late 2000s. They started producing as a new duo act titled Bioweapon in 2008. Prior to producing hardstyle, the pair had experimented with producing a number of hard-dance sounds, and had a number of other aliases. They produced a handful of popular tracks which were released on the "Aussie Hardstyle" label.

After gaining the attention of Scantraxx Recordz, and releasing more popular tracks, the pair secured a move to the Netherlands, the locus of the hardstyle scene. They would go on to play at a number of popular events, such as Bassleader in 2010. However, shortly after their move, and a packed festival season in 2011 where they played 40 events, the duo went their separate ways at the end of the year. They later explained that they felt they were experiencing a lot of pressure, both as friends and roommates, but also professionally and artistically. Soljan and Gonzalez had diverging visions for their respective projects, putting strain on their collaborative efforts until they had no choice but to separate, not only as collaborators but also as friends.

Soljan subsequently signed with Fusion Records at the end of 2011, under the alias Code Black. His first solo release, "Red Planet" in the same year, experienced great success within the hardstyle community.

=== 2012-2014: Start of Solo Career, Founding WE R Music ===
In 2012 Code Black performed a mix on the Kutski show for BBC Radio 1. The following year, he was voted as the 15th most popular DJ in the Australian website InTheMix's "National Top 50 DJs" list. He placed ahead of fellow hardstyle producer Toneshifterz.

In 2013, Brennan Heart joined forced with three Australian artists: Toneshifterz, Code Black and Outbreak, to found the label WE R Music. The label was originally launched as a sub-label of Be Yourself Music, whom were also hosting sub-labels from fellow hardstyle artists Frontliner and Wildstylez. "Brighter Day", one of Code Black's most commercially successful songs, was the first release on the new label, in April of 2013. It reached number 28 on the Dutch Dance Chart, and peaked at 8th in SLAM! FMs Top 40 Playlist.

The following year, Code Black was tasked with producing the anthem for Defqon.1's Australian Edition. His subsequent release, "Pandora", was considered a hit song in the hardstyle community. During this period of his career, he frequently collaborated with Atmozfears, who both shared a passion for Euphoric Hardstyle. The pair went on to release the highly euphoric XXLerator anthem, "Accelerate".

At the end of 2014, Code Black was listed in DJ Mag's Top 100 DJs list for the first and only time, polling at #92. While producing for Code Black, Soljan claimed that he was spending up to 70% of his time in the studio working on producing other music outside of the alias, citing his lack of focus on the project as a key reason why he hadn't begun working on a studio album at this time.

=== 2015-2018: Return of Bioweapon, Debut Album ===
Towards the end of 2015, Bioweapon returned after 4 years. Code Black and Audiofreq (Sam Gonzalez's independent alias) had been slowly working on the personal rift between each other, and returned to the studio to produce new Bioweapon music. While they performed a few shows, and released three new songs, including an EP which was released on WE R Music in 2016, the duo made it clear that their focus was on their solo careers and that they would be working on Bioweapon as a side project.

In late 2016, Code Black released a hardstyle remix of Florence + The Machine's cover of Candi Stanton's 1986 track "You Got the Love". Around the same time, social media posts from Belgian hardstyle DJ and founder of label Dirty Workz DJ Coone indicated that he and Code Black were in the studio together working on new music. The following year, the pair released a remix of the Gareth Emery track "Concrete Angel", which was subsequently named as the Mixmag "Tune of the Month" for September 2017. That same year, Code Black announced he was working on his debut album.

The following year, Journey was released, containing 18 tracks. Critics marvelled at the diversity of sounds available on the album, ranging from melodic, euphoric tracks he became well known for, to darker tracks and high energy basslines. The album featured collaborations with Da Tweekaz, Darren Styles, Wasted Penguinz and compatriot Toneshifterz. Discussions about a Bioweapon album were also entertained, although no official announcement was ever made confirming this.

=== 2019-Present: 3 BLOKES, Blackout, Bioweapon Album ===
From 2020-2021, during the COVID-19 Pandemic, hardstyle performances ceased due to government enforced limits on public gatherings. This gave producers, including Code Black, the opportunity to spend more time in the studio thinking about what music they wanted to make. It was around this time that Code Black decided to pursue a darker, more raw, underground sound, accepting criticisms that his more recent music catered to a "commercial sound".

3 BLOKES was a satirical music collaboration between compatriot hardstyle producers Code Black, his Bioweapon collaborator Audiofreq, and label-mate Toneshifterz. The act played on Australian bogan stereotypes, with the trio wearing very tacky casual clothes and fake mullets during their performances. 3 BLOKES was short lived, debuting at EDC Vegas in 2022, before playing at a handful of Australian events and two years at the UV stage of Defqon.1 before their last performance in 2024. When asked about the project in 2023, Audiofreq said:

"The 3 Blokes is a concept where we really wanted to dive into Australiana. We wanted not to take ourselves too seriously and to have fun with part of us. The best performances and the best acts really reflect part of the artists or artists themselves. It’s not just a completely made-up thing, there’s a fundamental part of who they are, and they exaggerate a little bit. That’s exactly what 3 Blokes is, right?"

At the start of 2023, speculation reemerged that Code Black and Audiofreq, while concurrently performing together as 3 BLOKES, had begun working on the long awaited Bioweapon album. An instagram post of Audiofreq in the studio with the caption "It's album time" gave fans hope that a Bioweapon album was finally coming to fruition, over 14 years since the duo started making music together.

In the middle of 2023, Code Black teased new music from his rawstyle inspired "Blackout" project at EDC Las Vegas, playing at the wasteLAND stage. The new live act, which featured a black masked outfit and hard kicks reminiscent of his older production style, was debuted at Intents Festival a few weeks after the EDC performance. The set was performed on the mainstage of Intents Fesitval, as well as the Blue Stage at Defqon.1, a rawstyle stage which was previously uncharted territory for the Australian.

In 2025, Bioweapon announced the release of their 14-track album Time Capsule, which revitalizes the "old familiar" hardstyle sound. Between January and March, they released a single a week until the entire album was made available on the 21st of March, via Dirty Workz. The album received a digital release, as well a limited release on 12" Vinyl. Code Black and Audiofreq would go on a subsequent album tour to celebrate the release of the album, including a series of shows in their home country of Australia.

== Discography ==
=== Albums ===
2018

- Journey

=== EPs ===
2012

- Activated / Your Moment (with Wasted Penguinz)

2018

- Chapter 1
- Chapter 2
- Chapter 3

=== Singles ===
2011

- Visions
- Red Planet

2012

- F.E.A.R.
- Can't Hold Me Back
- About The Music

2013

- Brighter Day
- R.E.V.O.L.U.T.I.O.N.
- I.N.C.O.N.T.R.O.L.
- Feels Good

2014

- Pandora
- Tonight Will Never Die (with Brennan Heart)
- Accelerate (Official XXlerator Anthem 2014) (with Atmozfears)
- Starting Over (with Atmozfears)
- Unleash The Beast (Defqon.1 Australia Anthem 2014)
- Tonight Will Never Die (Audiotricz Remix) (with Brennan Heart)

2015

- Draw Me Closer
- Accelerate (Darren Styles Edit) (with Atmozfears)
- New World (ft. Chris Madin)
- End Like This (with Wasted Penguinz, ft. Insali)
- Kick It Up Now (with Toneshifterz)
- Triangle
- Predator

2016

- See The Light (with Da Tweekaz and Paradise)
- Dragonblood (Defqon.1 Australia Anthem 2016) (with Audiofreq and Toneshifterz)
- Are You Ready

2017

- Wild Ones
- Broken (with Brennan Heart and Jonathan Mendelsohn)

2018

- Sparks (with Darren Styles)

2019

- GTFO (with Hard Driver)
- Lowr U Go

2020

- Shake Ya Shimmy (with Da Tweekaz)
- F*CK YEAH!!! (with Timmy Trumpet, Will Sparks, and Toneshifterz)
- All Or Nothing (whit Atmozfears and Toneshifterz)

=== On Albums ===
2018

- Before You Go (with Toneshifterz, on Toneshifterz - Shifting To The Source)

=== On Compilations ===
2012

- About The Music (with Toneshifterz, on Hard With Style)

2013

- Running Late (Brennan Heart & Code Black MF Earthquake Rawmix) (with Brennan Heart, on Be Yourself Dance Vol. 2)

2016

- Survive (with DV8 Rocks! and Zany, on Gary D. pres. 50 D.Techno Traxx)

=== Remixes ===
2012

- Black & White - Get Ya Hands Up

2017

- Gareth Emery ft. Christina Novelli - Concrete Angel (with Coone)

2020

- Let There Be Light, Code Black remix (with Audiotricz)
