= Music Made Addictz =

Studio album by D-Block and S-te-fan
- Released: September 28, 2009
- Genre: Hardstyle
- Label: Scantraxx
- Producer: Diederik Bakker; Stefan den Daas; Joram Metekohy; Michael Brons; Wesley Kapteijn; Jos Beuk; Roel Schutrups; Erwin van Kan; Kelly van Soest

Music Made Addictz is the debut album of Dutch hardstyle duo D-Block & S-te-Fan. The album was released under Scantraxx Records on September 28, 2009. The album featured 15 tracks and collaborations with artists such as Wildstylez and DJ Isaac.

== Track listing ==
CD

No.	Title	Length
1.	"Intro"	1:00
2.	"Music Made Addict"	4:41
3.	"Ultimate High"	4:38
4.	"Music Is Why (featuring DJ Isaac)"	4:27
5.	"Let'z Dance"	5:02
6.	"Supernova"	5:12
7.	"The Human Soul (featuring Wildstylez)"	4:30
8.	"Dreamerz of Dreamz"	4:12
9.	"Essence of Sound"	4:47
10.	"Let It Go (featuring Josh & Wesz)"	4:16
11.	"Teqnology"	4:29
12.	"Sound of Thunder (featuring MC Villan)"	4:51
13.	"In Other Wordz (featuring Deepack)"	4:41
14.	"Ride With Uz (Max Enforcer remix)"	4:31
15.	"Shiverz (featuring High Voltage)"	6:37

== Samplers ==
Four album samplers were released from Music Made Addictz. The samplers were released over the course of the months between October 2009 and December 2009. Album Sampler 1 was released on October 5. Sampler 2 was released on October 26, Sampler 3 was released on November 16, and the final Sampler was released on December 14. Samplers were released in 12" format and in digital download format. Each sampler contains the full version of the album tracks featured. The samplers were released under Scantraxx Evolutionz.

=== Sampler 1 track listing ===
No.	Title	Length
1.	"Sound of the Thunder (featuring MC Villan)"	6:14
2.	"Let It Go (featuring Josh and Wesz)"	5:38
3.	"Supernova"	5:52

=== Sampler 2 track listing ===
No.	Title	Length
1.	"Music Is Why (featuring DJ Isaac)"	6:08
2.	"Dreamerz of Dreamz"	7:13
3.	"Teqnology"	5:28

=== Sampler 3 track listing ===
No.	Title	Length
1.	"Shiverz (featuring High Voltage)"	6:02
2.	"Let'z Dance"	5:54
3.	"Ultimate High"	6:00

=== Sampler 4 track listing ===
No.	Title	Length
1.	"The Human Soul (featuring Wildstylez)"	5:48
2.	"Ride With Uz (Max Enforcer remix)"	5:51
3.	"The Essence of Sound"	5:52

== Notes ==
"Music Made Addict" was not featured on any album sampler because it was already released under Scantraxx Evolutionz in March 2009 under Scantraxx Evolutionz release 004. The song "Let It Go" is based on the melody of "Last of The Wilds" by the Finnish symphonic metal band, Nightwish, from their sixth album, Dark Passion Play.
