= Atmozfears =

Dutch hardstyle producer

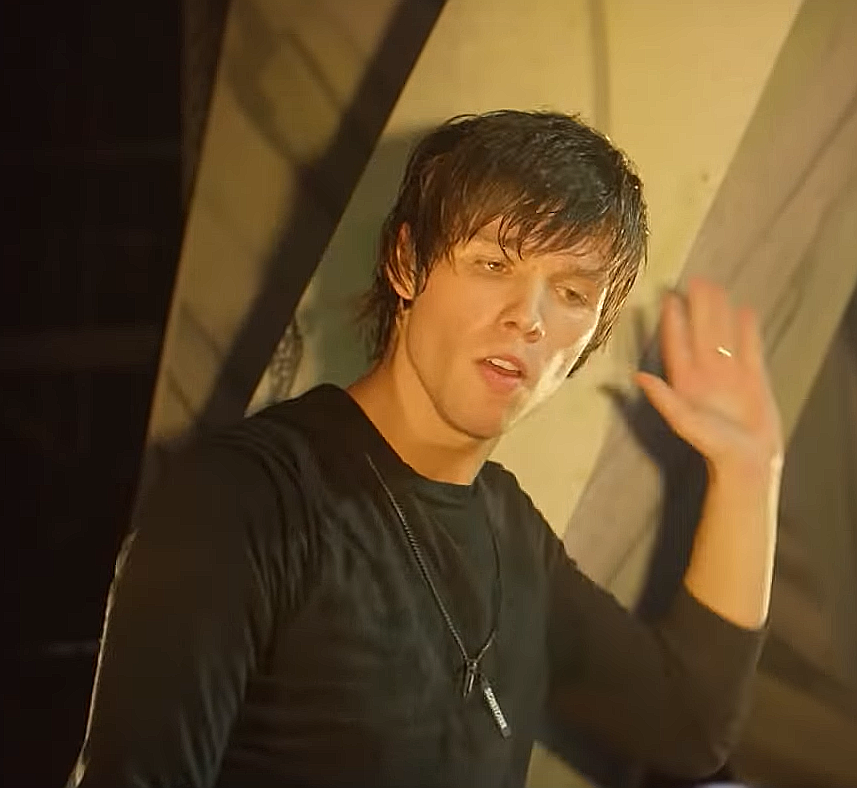
- Atmozfears playing live at Qlimax 2014

Background information
- Also known as: TVDS
- Origin: Netherlands
- Genre: Hardstyle
- Years active: 2009-present
- Members: Tim van de Stadt
- Past members: Kevin Keiser; Michael Jessen
- Website: www.atmozfea.rs

Tim van de Stadt, known by his stage name Atmozfears, is a Dutch hardstyle DJ and record producer.

Atmozfears was previously a trio formed in 2009, consisting of van de Stadt, Kevin Keiser and Michael Jessen. In February 2012, Atmozfears joined the hardstyle label Scantraxx Records. Atmozfears has played at such festivals as Defqon.1, The Qontinent, Q-Base and Tomorrowland.

By the end of 2012, Jessen had left the group, and Keiser departed the project some months later. van de Stadt kept the Atmozfears pseudonym, while Kesier went on to produce under the name Infrno.

== Biography ==
=== Prior to 2008: Musical beginnings ===
Tim van de Stadt grew up in a musical family and was already playing the piano at the age of 4. During his youth, his interest developed more and more towards electronic music and sound engineering. He initially made a name for himself online under the pseudonym DJ Vapour, with which he was already active in hardstyle. Together with his friend Bart Kuipers, he started the act BK & T-mothy, mostly producing house music. At the age of 17, producer Joshua Dutrieux (also known as JDX) noticed him and invited him to his studio in Hollywood to teach him more about producing music. After a few months, van de Stadt returned to the Netherlands and continued to perform there with Kuipers under the name Paranoia.

=== 2008–13: Foundation and separation of the trio ===
In 2008, van de Stadt met Kevin Keiser, who had previously founded the Atmozfears project with Michael Jessen. The trio met through an online forum, and immediately got to work on their debut single: "The Return". The song was created in collaboration with the Dutch hardstyle producer Max Force, and was released on the Italian record label “Explosive Records”. At this time, Keiser lived in Canada, van de Stadt in Germany and Jessen in the Netherlands. The trio met in person for the first time in the spring of 2009 and the songs "Supernatural" and "Inflicting You" were created. After releasing individual songs on various labels until the end of 2011, popular hard dance label Scantraxx Recordz became aware of them at the start of 2012 and signed the trio.

Their debut EP "Living for the Future" was released on Scantraxx in the spring, popularising them in the hardstyle scene. Regarding the distribution of roles, Keiser said that he worked on arrangement and sound design, while van de Stadt was the “brain” of the trio and was responsible for generating ideas. During this time, van de Stadt would not appear during their performances, leaving Keiser and Jessen to be the public face of the group. However, by the end of 2012, Jessen announced that he was leaving the project.

With Jessen's departure, van de Stadt started accompanying Keiser behind the decks in 2013. Their popularity on stage increased through joint appearances with Brennan Heart, Audiotricz and their long-time idol Wildstylez, amongst others. Collaborating with compatriot hardstyle duo Audiotricz, their remix of Fedde le Grand & Nicky Romero's "Sparks (Turn off your mind)" was performed at that year's endshow for Defqon.1. Just a few days later, Scantraxx announced that Keiser would also be leaving the project and launching his own solo act.

=== 2014–15: First Years Solo, featuring at big festivals ===
In 2014, the first full year of being a solo act, Atmozfears had several collaborations with other artists. In collaboration with Australian hardstyle artist Code Black, the pairing produced two of euphoric hardstyle's most defining tracks of the year: Starting Over, and Accelerate (Official XXlerator Anthem 2014). Both tracks, as well as Atmozfears' remix of Bass Modulators "Bounce & Break" broke into the top 25 in the Q-Dance Top 100 at the end of the year.

Given his increasing popularity, Atmozfears was booked by Q-Dance to play at Qlimax for the first time in his career at the end of 2014. Early in his debut Qlimax performance, he premiered a track which would become synonymous with his euphoric sound, "Release". Featuring David Spekter on vocals, the track garnered an intense, emotional reaction from the crowd. The song was officially released the following year, and gained widespread popularity throughout the hardstyle scene. Atmozfears himself was extremely proud of the track, but acknowledged that he may never produce a track as great or impactful ever again.

The popular release of "Release" in 2015 was also accompanied by another popular track, "Reawakening", teaming up with previous collaborators Audiotricz. Both tracks were positioned inside the top 5 most popular hard dance songs of the year, as voted in the Q-Dance 2015 Top 100. A further six tracks of Atmozfears' featured in the list, with his total of eight tracks in the list second only to Noisecontrollers, whom the list featured nine of his tracks, after he released a huge amount of studio material from the decade prior. He continued to broaden his collaborative efforts, releasing collaborations with Devin Wild and Sub Zero Project. He also co-produced "Can You Feel It" alongside Carnage, for the latter's studio album Papi Gordo, which was released in October 2015, and features vocals from Ty$.

2015 also saw Atmozfears being requested to begin making anthems for major hardstyle festivals. He produced "Gold Skies", the weekend soundtrack for Decibel Outdoor, and then returned to his second Qlimax as the anthem creator, producing "Equilibrium". He also played on the mainstages of Defqon.1 (both at the Dutch and Australian editions), The Qontinent and Q-Base.

=== 2016-17: More collaborations, Dispute with Energyzed ===
In 2016, Atmozfears started project together with the compatriot DJ and producer Sergio van den Heuvel to release electro house music: ATMO. After producing a remix to Hardwell's single "Run Wild", they had to change their name for copyright reasons to Seth Hills. After the duo changed their name to an Americanisation of van den Heuvel's name, Atmozfears left the project and Seth Hills continued producing and performing as a solo act.

At the Ultra Music Festival, Hardwell performed a reworked version of Atmozfears song "Raise Your Hands". The song was released as a double single with the song "Get 'Em".

For the 2016 edition of Defqon.1, a duo named ALLSTVRS was billed for The Gathering on the Friday. ALLSTVRS was revealed to be Atmozfears and Audiotricz at Defqon.1. In late August, he also premiered a collaboration with Hardwell at his last “I Am Hardwell – United We Are” show at the Hockenheimring. "All That We're Living For" was released the following year, and featured on the first EP from the Hardwell & Friends series.

At this time, Sub Zero Project were the newest up-and-coming talents in the hardstyle scene, and Atmozfears had been collaborating with the duo since 2014. They had already released two tracks: "Madman" and "This Is Madness", and footage of the three in the studio from 2016 captures them working on new music. They would later go on to play a set together at Qapital in 2017, and release "Drop the bomb" later that year.

On January 1, 2017, Atmozfears posted a text on Facebook in which he accused the Dutch DJ and producer Xander Mourits aka Energyzed of stealing. He found out through friends and also through the record label that Energyzed van de Stadt's project files, kicks as well as other samples and entire demo tracks were stolen, renamed and then sold for several thousand dollars. The Facebook post disappeared after some time, and it is believed that they settled out of court. In the course of the dispute, they presented a final single together as a sign of their previous good friendship. This was released under the title "Fabric of Creation / Age of Gods" on January 30, 2017. A week later, on February 6, 2017, his fourth collaboration with Audiotricz, "Handz Up", premiered at Defqon.1 the previous year, was released.

In the middle of the 2017 festival season, Atmozfears, alongside Audiotricz, Bass Modulators and Noisecontrollers, founded the Spirit of Hardstyle record label. This occasion marked Atmozfears' official departure from Scantraxx, although he would return to produce singles alongside frequent collaborators, such as Devin Wild and Demi Kanon. The Spirit of Hardstyle team would present their vision for sound at Hard Bass early the following year, featuring as the live-set for Team Green.

=== 2018-19: Anthem creator ===
At the beginning of 2018, Atmozfears produced the anthem of the Australian festival Midnight Mafia, releasing the song "City of Dragons" on Spirit of Hardstyle. This was followed by a series of solo singles and a collaboration with the Dutch producer Noisecontrollers, also released on their record-label. He was also commissioned to produce the anthem for the 2018 edition of Q-Base. The 2018 Edition of Q-Base was the 15th and final edition ever held, with Atmozfears' anthem being titled "The Final Mission".

Following Q-Base, in October 2018, Atmozfears presented their collaboration with Demi Kannon, titled "The Humming", at a Q-dance event, which was a cover version of the eponymous track by Irish musician Enya. The song quickly gained popularity in the hardstyle scene, but Enya did not allow it to be released because she herself did not like the song and consequently prohibited the use of her music.

Atmozfears finished 2018 with 6 tracks in the Q-Dance Top 100, with his highest track being "Breathe", a collaboration with Devin Wild. The following year, Atmozfears made the anthem for the Decibel outdoor festival named "Live Loud", in collaboration with LXCPR, which was released on June 24, 2019. Around this time, Atmozfears revealed at a panel discussion that he was suffering from the weight of expectations and had voluntarily taken a step back from his career for more work-life balance. He echoed concerns from other DJs such as Headhunterz and Coone that the scene needed a better understadning of the pressures artists experience on an ongoing basis. At the end of 2019, his record label merged into Project One duo Headhunterz' and Wildstylez' label "Art of Creation."

=== 2020-23: Debut album, 2//\\1 ===
In 2020, due to the impact of COVID-19 Lockdowns, the hardstyle scene was mandated to stop hosting events, and all artists, including Atmozfears, were given an unprecedented amount of time in the studio to make new music. Consequently, he started working on his first full-length album, titled [this is my story]. While he initially planned on releasing the album in 2020, the ongoing lack of opportunities to showcase his music in front of a live audience caused him to push back the release to 2021. The album itself has a more experimental sound than his previous work, which he says audiences might not be familiar with due to the creative restraints he had placed on himself earlier in his career to release music which he thought would be popular. [this is my story] features themes of Atmozfears' personal journey, his thoughts and his struggles.

Once the album was released, whilst full parties were not allowed to go ahead, he was still able to host a small album-release party for a small group of dedicated fans. He maintained connections with these fans by streaming on Twitch, who were also able to support him during the pandemic in other ways:

"It’s been crazy how supportive my community has become, and I can say that they’ve helped me through this pandemic both mentally and financially." - Atmozfears, November 2021

Following the merger of "Spirit of Hardstyle" and "Art of Creation", Atmozfears left the label and began releasing music on Q-Dance Records, who was also home to melodic twins Sound Rush. The two acts would become frequent collaborators, and began referring to themselves as 2//\\1 (pronounced "Together As One"). They performed together throughout the early 2020s, including a performance at the 2021 edition of "Defqon.1 at Home".

=== 2024-Present: Classics Shows ===
Throughout the mid-2020s, having been a well recognised name in the hardstyle scene for over a decade, Atmozfears began to be booked at classics shows, which focus on older music rather than new releases. Some of these sets were solo, but he also had the opportunity to play alongside former collaborators, such as Code Black and B-Front.

In 2025, Hardwell, whom Atmozfears had collaborated with 8 years ago, teased a new melodic hardstyle collaboration while playing the Saturday night closing set on the main stage of Ultra Music Festival. The newest track from the duo was a surprise to some, but a few months later, "Hideaway" (featuring vocals from Jaimes) was released on Hardwell's label, Revealed Recordings.

In early 2026, Atmozfears collaborated with Noiseflow, a German duo who had been making a name for themselves over the past year with their "Deutche Krach" sound, which features bass heavy, oversaturated microwave sounds. The krach sound, alongside Atmozfears signature melodies, were combined to create the anthem for Asteria Festival, a hardstyle event held in Melbourne, Australia. Later in the year, Atmozfears produced another track for the Defqon.1 Endshow, 13 years after his first, titled "In The Cold". He also spoke at length about his disappointment with the modern direction of the scene, claiming that shortened attention spans and the need to algorithmically optimise music had left everyone following trends instead of being authentic.

== Discography ==
=== Albums ===
2016

- Mini-Album

2021

- this is my story

=== EPs ===
2009

- Our Destiny EP (vs. The Vision)

2012

- Rip The Jacker / World Of Presets
- Living for the Future EP
- Hypnotika / Don't Let Me Down
- Black Sky (as TVDS)
- Just Let Go / Destrukto
- Another Day (as TVDS)

2013

- Another Day / Starscream
- Atmozfears E.P. One

2014

- Atmozfears E.P. Two
- Rapture EP (with Energyzed)
- She Goes EP (with Adrenalize)

2015

- Singularity / Madman / Never Again

2016

- Fabrik Of Creation / Age Of Gods (ft. Energyzed)

2019

- Live Loud EP (with LXCPR)

=== Singles ===
2008

- The Return (with Max Force)

2009

- Supernatural / Inflicting You (Brainkicker presents Atmozfears)

2011

- Welcome 2 Hell
- Adrenaline
- Pleasure & Pain (with Lady Faith)

2012

- Pure Fantasy (with Adrenalize)
- For You (as TVDS)
- Bumblebee (as TVDS)
- Time Stands Still (ft. Yuna-X)
- What It's Like (with Wildstylez)

2013

- Bella Nova
- State Of Mind (with In-Phase)

2014

- Weapons Of Love (with Da Tweekaz, ft. Popr3b3l)
- Accelerate (Official Xxlerator Anthem 2014) (with Code Black)
- Starting Over (with Code Black)
- I Need You
- Raise Your Hands (with Audiotricz)

2015

- Reawakening (with Audiotricz)
- On Your Mark
- Release (ft. David Spekter)
- Release (Chill Mix) (ft. David Spekter)
- Gold Skies (#DB15 Official Weekend Soundtrack)
- Nature's Gasp (with Devin Wild)
- This Is Madness (with Sub Zero Project)
- Equilibrium (Qlimax Anthem 2015)

2016

- Keep Me Awake (ft. David Spekter)
- What About Us (with Audiotricz)

2017

- Handz Up (with Audiotricz)
- Embrace the Sea (WiSH Outdoor 2017 Anthem)
- Leave It All Behind
- All That We Are Living For (with Hardwell, ft. M. Bronx)
- Come Together (with Demi Kanon)

2018

- Sacrifice
- City of Dragons (Midnight Mafia Anthem 2018)
- Feel Good (with Adrenalize)
- This Is Our World (with Noisecontrollers)
- POPO (with Devin Wild) (Free Download)
- The Final Mission (Q-Base 2018 Anthem)
- Yesterday (with Demi Kanon, ft. David Spekter)
- Lose It All
- Breathe (with Devin Wild, ft. David Spekter)
- Come Together (Chill Mix) (with Demi Kanon)

2019

- Gladiators (with Devin Wild)
- Together As One (with Sound Rush, featuring Michael Jo)
- Move Ma Body (with Demi Kanon)
- Live Loud (Official Decibel Outdoor 2019 Anthem) (with LXCPR)
- The Whistle
- Move Ma Body (Uptempo Edit) (with Demi Kanon)
- Das Boot (with Noisecontrollers and B-Front)

2020

- Keep Your Eyes Open (with Jesse Jax) (Free Download)
- my story
- Accelerate - Chill Mix (with Code Black)
- darkness (with Villain)
- All Or Nothing (with Code Black and Toneshifterz)
- Breathe 2020 (with Devin Wild, featuring David Spekter)
- home

2021

- One In A Million (with Code Black, featuring David Spekter)
- Lost With You (with Refuzion)
- Ghosts (with Demi Kanon, featuring David Spekter)
- Come Back Home (with Sound Rush)
- Darkness (with Villain)
- Country Roads (with Sound Rush)

=== Album- and compilation featurings ===
2012

- Distortion Fields (with Inner Heat; on Inner Heat - 2 Gether EP)
- Restart (on Headhunterz − Hard With Style)

2013

- Unexpected (with Phuture Noize; on Phuture Noize − Music Rules The Noize)

2015

- Can You Feel It (with Carnage & Ty Dolla Sign; on Carnage − Papi Gordo)

2017

- Push It Back (with Sub Sonik; on Sub Sonik − Strike One)
- Talk Facts (with Bodyshock; on Bodyshock − Riot & Rise Pt.2)

2018

- You & Me (with Toneshifterz; on Toneshifterz − Shifting To The Source)

2020

- Way of The Wicked (with Audiotricz, ft. MC DL; on Audiotricz − A New Dawn)
- To War (with Sub Sonik; on Sub Sonik - Kings Never Die)
- Crazy (with Sound Rush; on Sound Rush - Brothers)

=== Remixes ===
2012

- The Prophet - Really Don't Care

2013

- Wildstylez - Delay Distortion
- Fedde Le Grand & Nicky Romero ft. Matthew Koma - Sparks (Turn Off Your Mind) (with Audiotricz)
- Phuture Noize - Fadin’

2014

- Tritonal & Paris Blohm ft. Sterling Fox - Colors
- Bass Modulators - Bounce & Break

2016

- Darren Styles - Come Running

2018

- Headhunterz - Psychedelic (on Headhunterz - The Art Of Remixes EP)

2019

- San Holo - I Still See Your Face (Free Download)

2020

- San Holo - Brighter Days

2021

- Topmodelz - Your Love (with Sound Rush)
