= Wildstylez =

Dutch hardstyle DJ and record producer

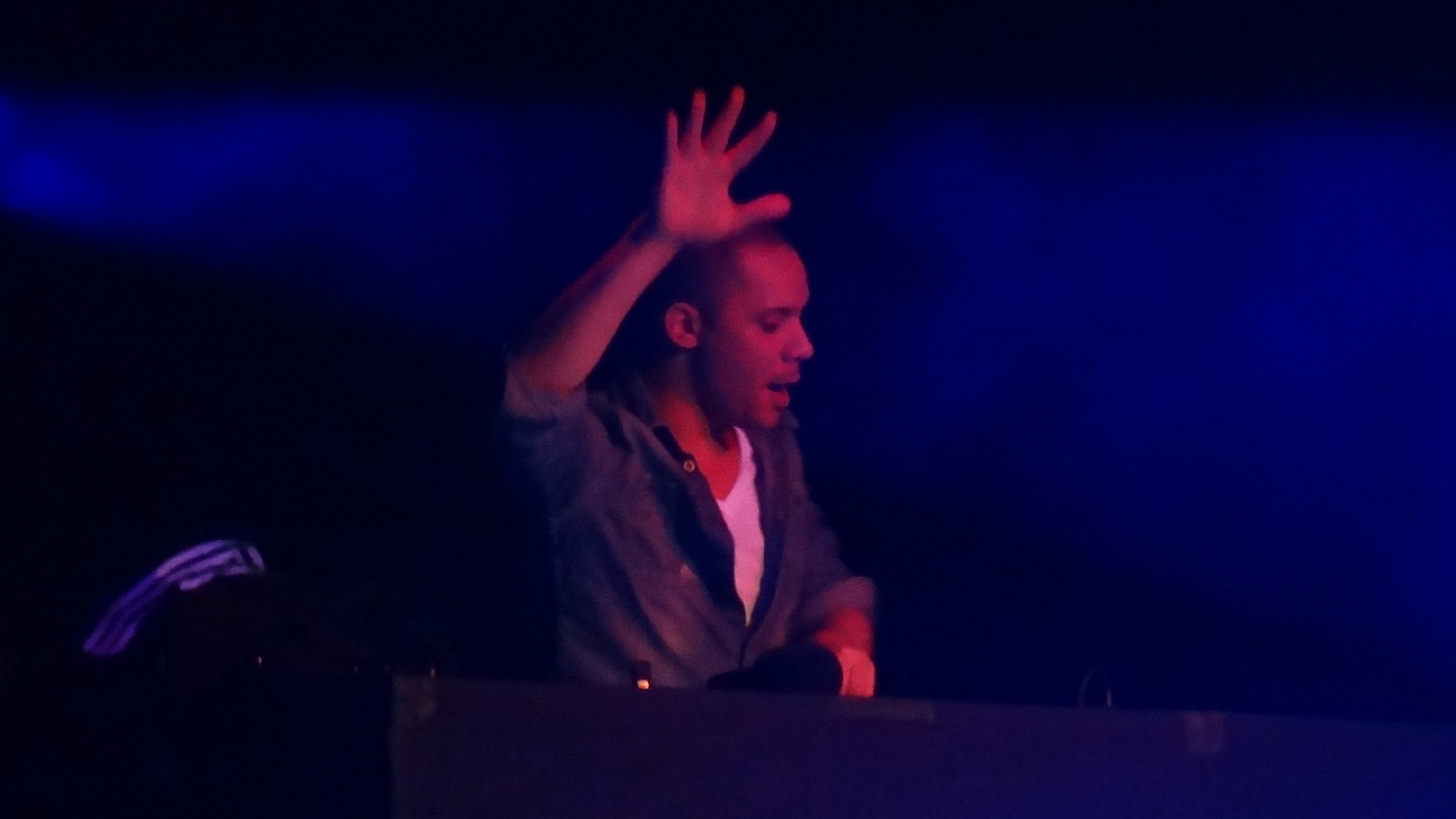
- Wildstylez playing in Stockholm, 2012

Background information
- Born: 7 January 1983 (age 43); Veenendaal, Netherlands
- Genres: Hardstyle
- Years active: 2007–present
- Labels: Scantraxx; Digital:Age; Q-Dance Records; Lose Control Music; Art of Creation
- Website: wildstylez.com

Joram Metekohy (born 7 January 1983), better known by his stage name Wildstylez, is a Dutch hardstyle DJ and record producer. Having previously released hardstyle records under the alias 'Seizure', Wildstylez had his first solo release in 2007 on the Scantraxx sub-label Scantraxx Reloaded.

In 2010, he started the record label Digital:Age in collaboration with Noisecontrollers. After he stopped releasing on Digital:Age, Wildstylez founded his own hardstyle label, Lose Control Music, later bringing on board fellow hardstyle producer Max Enforcer. In 2018, Wildstylez founded the label Art of Creation with long time friend and collaborator, Headhunterz.

Throughout his career, Wildstylez has made numerous collaborations with other hardstyle artists, the most notable of these being Project One, which he formed with Headhunterz in 2008. He has also collaborated on tracks with other artists such as Noisecontrollers, Brennan Heart, The Prophet, Ran-D, Alpha², Max Enforcer and D-Block & S-te-Fan.

== History ==
=== 2004-08: First Releases, Birth of Project One ===
Joram Metekohy first started producing hardstyle with Ruben Hooyer in 2004 under the alias 'Seizure'. Together they had multiple releases on labels such as Sys-X Records, Blutonium Records, StraightOn Recordings and Scantraxx. In 2006, he was introduced to Scantraxx and began working on material with Alpha² that would eventually get a release on the Scantraxx sublabel Paint It Black. At the time, the three artists released their music under the name 'Outsiders'. In late 2007, having previously released on Scantraxx as Seizure, Metekohy had his first solo release as Wildstylez, "Life'z a Bitch/Missin'" on the Scantraxx sub-label run by Headhunterz: Scantraxx Reloaded.

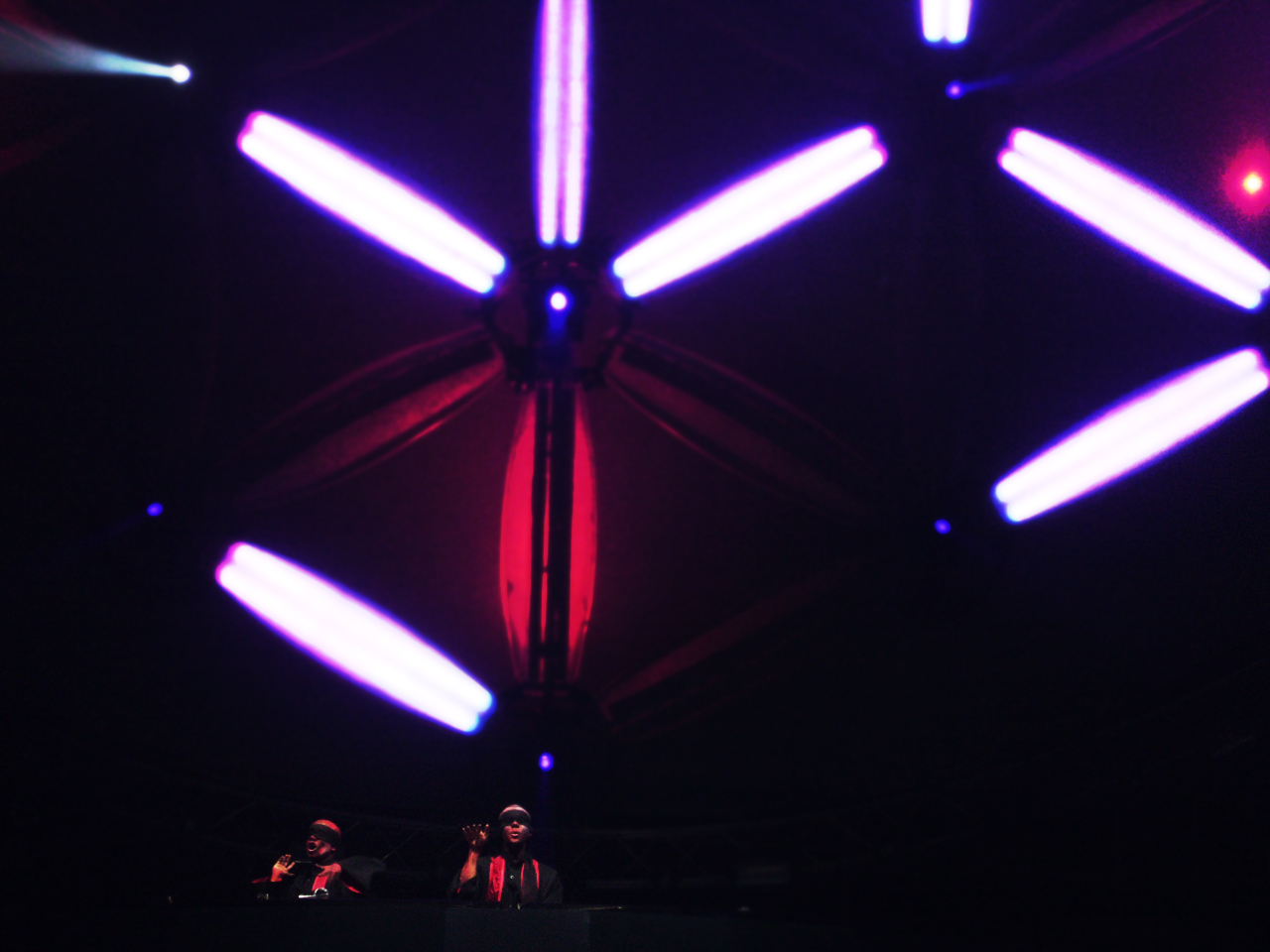
Project One at Qlimax 2008

2008 would prove to be a breakout year for Wildstylez. He had numerous releases on various Scantraxx sub-labels including Silver, Special and Reloaded, and also featured on the main label. It also saw his first collaboration with one of the most popular up and coming hardstyle artists, Headhunterz. Their first release, "Blame It on the Music/Project 1" in early 2008 proved a success and provided the impetus for the launch of a new collaborative project: Project One. Finishing in under three months producing an average of one track a week, Headhunterz and Wildstylez completed their 13-track debut album, Headhunterz & Wildstylez Present: Project One. The duo had their debut performance in the middle of 2008 at Defqon.1, and the album was released shortly after on both CD and digital formats on the 25^{th} of July, 2008. Project One was well received in the hardstyle community with tracks such as "Life Beyond Earth", "The Art of Creation", "The Story Unfolds" and "Fantasy or Reality", all proving to be successes on the dance floor. A Project One tour followed along with 6 full-length album samplers and 1 remix sampler, all released on Scantraxx Reloaded.

'Art of Creation'
'Art of Creation' by Project One, from the self titled album released in 2008.

=== 2009-11: More Solo Work, Collaborations with Noisecontrollers ===
2009 saw Wildstylez move away from Project One and further enhance and refine the Wildstylez sound with many well received solo releases such as "Muzic or Noize", "Phantom Beat" and "Single Sound". 2009 also saw the release of one of the most popular hardstyle songs of its time, "Tonight", credited to Headhunterz & Wildstylez vs. Noisecontrollers. In 2013, "Tonight" was voted second in the Q-dance Harder Styles top 1000. Later, in 2020, Q-Dance hosted another voting competition where the Alpha^{2} remix of "Tonight" was voted as the fourth most popular hardstyle track of all time.

2010 saw further strong solo releases on a variety of Scantraxx sublabels, including "A Complex Situation" on Scantraxx Reloaded, "Feedback" on Scantraxx Silver, a collaboration with DJ Isaac called "Lost in Music" released on Scantraxx Special and his first appearance on the newly formed A² Records with old collaborators Alpha² with their track "Atrocious". Wildstylez also produced the anthem for the 2010 edition of the popular hardstyle festival, Defqon.1, titled "No Time to Waste". The anthem was accompanied by a hardcore and dubstyle remix on release.

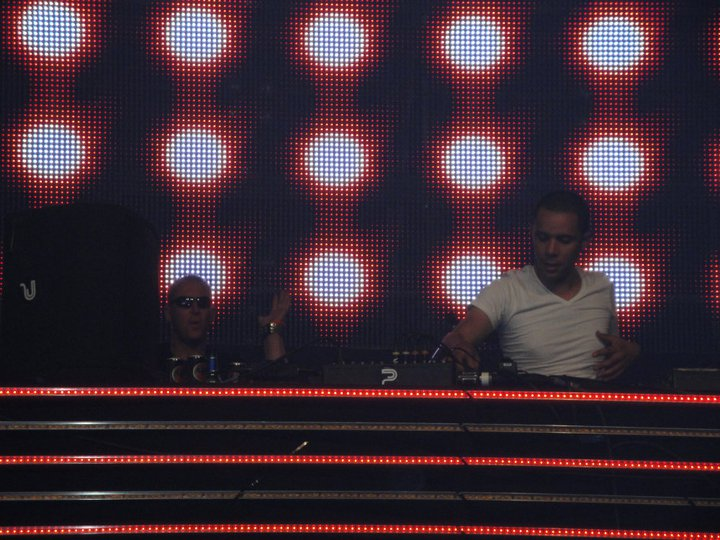
Wildstylez performing at Intents Festival, 2011

In 2010, Wildstylez left the Scantraxx main label and, together with Noisecontrollers, established a new hardstyle label called Digital:Age. Having worked together previously on collaborations and remixes of each other's tracks, both Wildstylez and Noisecontrollers felt they needed to leave their parent labels to take their careers to the next level.

2011 saw the first two Digital:Age releases from both Wildstylez and Noisecontrollers, titled "A Different Story" and "Stardust". Following this, Wildstylez released four solo tracks on Digital:Age, "Huh?", "Back to Basics", "Lonely" and "Into the Light". In 2012, Wildstylez produced both the Dutch and Australian Defqon.1 anthems. The Dutch anthem, "World of Madness", saw him collaborate again with Headhunterz and Noisecontrollers.

=== 2012-14: End of Digital:Age, Popular Singles, Start of Lose Control Music ===
In 2012, both Wildstylez and Noisecontrollers had their final releases on Digital:Age, and the label quietly stopped operations. Wildstylez went on to release on labels A² Records, Brennan Heart Music, Q-Dance Records and a collection of self-released free tracks via social media. These free releases included a bootleg remix of David Guetta & Nicky Romero's popular song "Wild One".

'Year of Summer'
Sample of 'Year of Summer' by Wildstylez, released in 2012 by Q-Dance Records.

His 2012 track with singer Niels Geusebroek, "Year of Summer", brought Wildstylez into the mainstream dance scene in the Netherlands, with the track reaching platinum status and also receiving airtime on Dutch daytime radio stations.

At the 2012 Defqon.1 Endshow, which has long since established a reputation for debuting emotional hardstyle tracks amongst the backdrop of fireworks and laser shows, Q-Dance premiered the Wildstylez' track "Timeless", which went on to be voted as one of the top 25 hardstyle tracks of all time. Towards the end of the year, Wildstylez also released "Lose My Mind", a collaboration with Brennan Heart. The video clip is the most viewed music video on Wildstylez' YouTube channel, with over 32 million views at the time of writing.

At the beginning of 2013, a statement from Scantraxx manager Rudy Peters confirmed that Wildstylez had indeed left the Scantraxx brand after five years, also implying that Digital:Age had been a Scantraxx affiliated label when formed. In January 2013, Wildstylez had the opportunity to host his own X-Qlusive, an event concept by Q-Dance which primarily focuses on the music of a single artist and their career. Held on 19 January at the Heineken Music Hall in the Netherlands, X-Qlusive:Wildstylez was a sold-out event. Popular hardstyle artists and former collaborators Noisecontrollers, Headhunterz and Alpha² were included in the lineup.

Later in 2013, Wildstylez formed his own record label titled Lose Control Music, alongside Max Enforcer. The hardstyle label was formed in partnership with Be Yourself Music, a dance related record label and management company. Be Yourself Music had also recently established similar partnerships with popular hardstyle artists Frontliner and Brennan Heart. In late 2013, Wildstylez had his first release on Lose Control Music with the single "Lights Go Out". Aside from Max Enforcer and Wildstylez, no other artists are signed to the label, although the label featured one-off releases from prominent hardstyle artists, such as Audiotricz, Noiseshock and Sound Rush. The duo running the label decided against signing artists in pursuit of greater artistic freedom (both for themselves and others), only choosing to release high quality productions as they saw fit.

=== 2015-17: Debut Album ===
Prior to 2015, Wildstylez as a solo artist had only ever released singles, and his only album was the 2008 collaboration: Headhunterz & Wildstylez Present Project One: The Album. In following with the name of his record label, Wildstylez released his debut solo album "Lose Control" in June of 2015. The album featured collaborations with label-mate Max Enforcer, Brennan Heart, Noisecontrollers, Zany and Audiotricz. The first single from the album, "Lies or Truth" (with Brennan Heart) continued the pair's success following "Lose My Mind", receiving airplay on commercial radio station SLAM!FM. The second single from the album was a collaboration with Audiotricz titled "Turn the Music Up". Despite both artists being hardstyle artists, the track only plays at 132 BPM, a speed more associated with house and trance music. Even by his own admission, Wildstylez admitted the song might be "too slow" for hardstyle sets, but he was optimistic that it would give both hardstyle and more mainstream EDM artists an opportunity to play his music. "Turn the Music Up" was played by many prominent DJs following its release, including Tritonal, Vinai & W&W. The latter re-released the track on their own sub-label of Armada Music, Mainstage Music. Despite the popularity of some of the tracks from the album, and the numerous collaborators Wildstylez featured on the album, he expressed some regret that long-time friend and collaborator Headhunterz couldn't finish a track together for the release. Wildstylez stated in an interview that he respected Headhunterz' decision not to focus on hardstyle at the time, but was confident the duo would return to making music with one another.

After almost 6 years, 2016 saw Wildstylez reunited with Headhunterz, who played together again as Project One at Qlimax. Over the following year, they released new music together, including an EP: EP I (on Q-Dance Records), and continued to play together throughout 2017 and 2018. In 2017, Wildstylez was chosen to create the anthem for Qlimax, "Temple of Light". He also teased a collaboration with mainstream EDM producer Hardwell, posting pictures of the duo together in a recording studio on his social media. This marked the first time the pair had officially collaborated in the studio, following Wildstylez' 2013 remix of Hardwell & Dyro's powerful vocal track: "Never Say Goodbye".

=== 2018-Present: Collaborations with Popular DJs, Art of Creation ===
2018 saw the release of Wildstylez' first official collaboration with Hardwell: "Shine A Light", with vocals from pop-rock vocalist KiFi. Hardwell premiered the track as his closing song during his Ultra Miami 2018 set in March, with the song being released in June on Hardwell's Revealed Records.

Following Headhunterz' return to producing and playing hardstyle music in 2017, the duo of Project One fame formed a new label titled "Art of Creation" (sharing the name with a track from their 2008 collaborative album) at the start of 2018. Wildstylez would go on to release his first tracks on the Art of Creation label, his own EP titled Children of Drums, and remixes for Evil Activities & Endymion. Later in 2019, Art of Creation would absorb artists from Noisecontrollers' label: Spirit of Hardstyle, bringing 5 new artists onto Wildstylez' label.

In 2022, Wildstylez would return to the popular EDM scene, releasing "Typically Dutch" alongside compatriot trance artist Armin van Buuren. The song's lyrics poke fun at dutch stereotypes, discuss themes of dutch pride, and focusses on the talent which the small nation has provided to dance music. While being a slower trance track, there is an uplifting melody typical of Wildstylez' productions.

In 2023, 11 years after its release, "Year of Summer" became the first ever hardstyle track to feature in the Dutch NPO Radio 2 program Top 2000, where audiences vote for their favourite 2000 songs of all time. At the time, the track was enjoying a minor resurgence in popularity, with Niels Geusebroek performing the song live on a number of occasions. The track was voted #1756 out of the 2000 songs selected for the end-of-year radio show.

At the start of 2025, Wildstylez' hosted his very own event, returning to AFAS Live (since renamed from Heineken Music Hall) where his Q-Dance X-Qlusive event was held 12 years prior. The event featured artists from the hardstyle scene who he had previously collaborated with, and culminated in a 2 hour long special solo set. The show and special set was named "Timeless", after his 2012 hit track, to emphasise his musical catalogue's eternal presence within the hard dance community. Later in 2025, in the midst of his friend and collaborator Headhunterz' long hiatus from performing, a return show for Project One was announced. Their subsequent performance in 2026 marked the first time the duo had played together as Project One in over 7 years.

== Discography ==
=== Albums ===
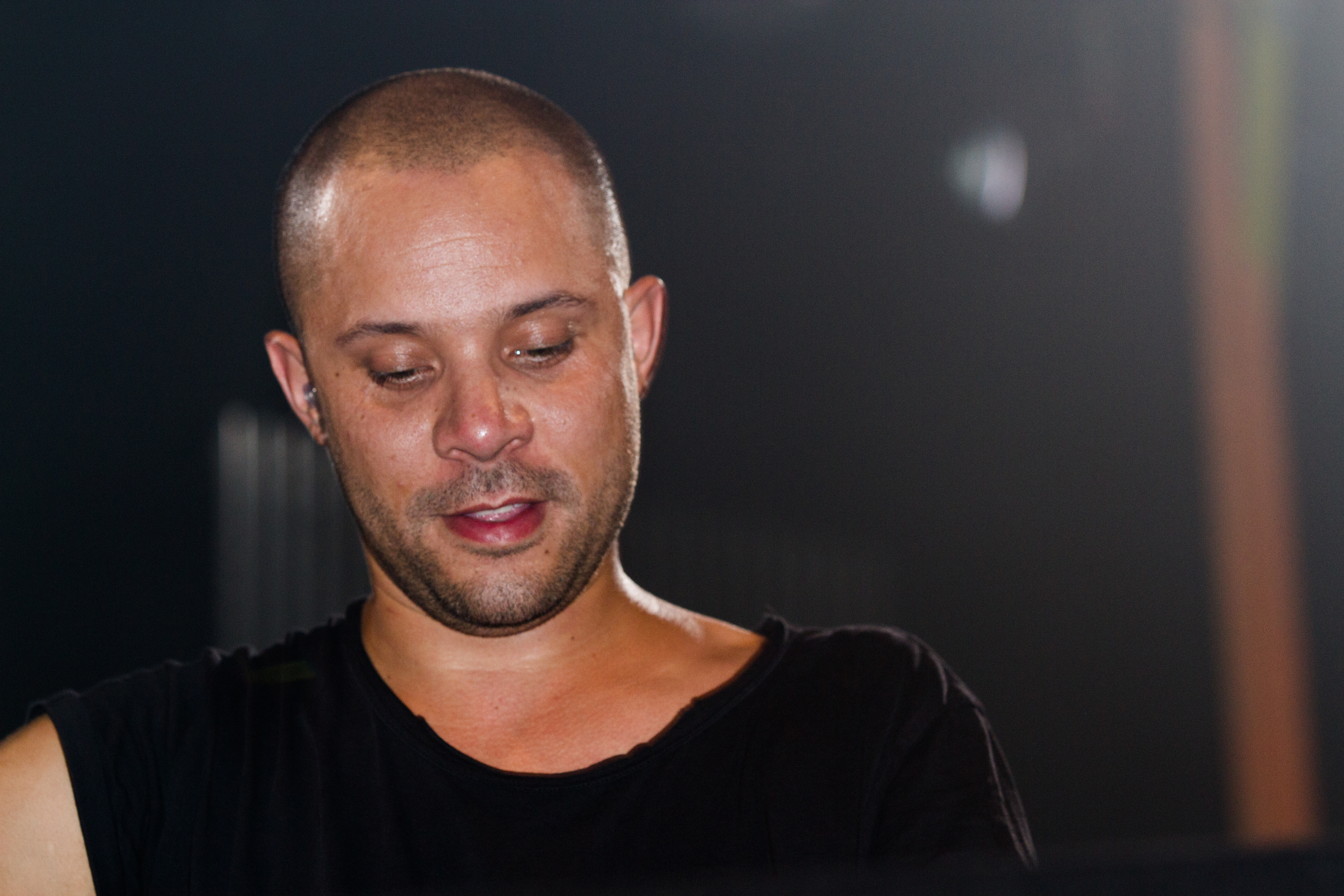
Joram Metekohy at the Airbeat One Festival 2015 in Germany

Album title	Album details
Lose Control	Released: 12 June 2015; Label: Lose Control Music (LCMCD001); Format: CD, download

=== Singles and EPs ===
Year	Title	Release details
2007	"Life'z a Bitch / Missin'"	Released: 28 August; Label: Scantraxx Reloaded; Format: Vinyl
2007	"Clubbin' / K.Y.H.U"	Released: 19 November; Label: Scantraxx; Format: Vinyl
2008	"Blame It on the Music / Project 1"	Wildstylez vs. Headhunterz; Released: 4 March; Label: Scantraxx Reloaded; Format: Vinyl & MP3, 320 kbit/s
2008	"Cold Rockking / Alive!"	The Prophet (feat. Wildstylez); Released: 18 August; Label: Scantraxx Silver; Format: Vinyl & MP3, 320 kbit/s
2008	"Revenge / Truth"	Released: 19 August; Label: Scantraxx; Format: Vinyl
2008	"Pleasure / LDMF (Wildstylez Remix)"	Released: 8 December; Label: Scantraxx; Format: Vinyl
2009	"Muzic or Noize / The Moon"	Released: 2 March; Label: Scantraxx Reloaded; Format: Vinyl & MP3, 320 kbit/s
2009	"Tonight"	Headhunterz & Wildstylez vs. Noisecontrollers; Released: 1 June; Label: Scantraxx Reloaded; Format: Vinyl & MP3, 320 kbit/s
2009	"The Phantom Beat / Single Sound"	Released: 8 June; Label: Scantraxx Silver; Format: Vinyl, digital download
2009	"Push That Feeling / K.Y.H.U (Noisecontrollers Remix)"	Released: 22 June; Label: Scantraxx; Format: Vinyl
2009	"Spin That Shit"	Wildstylez & Frontliner; Released: 9 November; Label: Scantraxx Special; Format: Vinyl & MP3, 320 kbit/s
2010	"No Time to Waste (Defqon.1 Festival Anthem 2010)"	Released: 1 June; Label: Q-Dance; Format: Vinyl & MP3, 320 kbit/s
2010	"Atrocious"	Wildstylez & Alpha²; Released: 8 June; Label: A² Records; Format: MP3, 320 kbit/s
2010	"In & Out"	Released: 14 June; Label: Scantraxx Reloaded; Format: Vinyl & MP3, 320 kbit/s
2010	"Lost in Music"	Wildstylez & Isaac; Released: 15 October; Label: Scantraxx Special; Format: MP3, 320 kbit/s
2010	"Feedback / Delay Distortion"	Released: 1 November; Label: Scantraxx Silver; Format: MP3, 320 kbit/s
2011	"A Different Story"	Wildstylez & Noisecontrollers; Released: 1 April; Label: Digital:Age; Format: MP3, 320 kbit/s
2011	"Stardust"	Wildstylez & Noisecontrollers; Released: 14 April; Label: Digital:Age; Format: MP3, 320 kbit/s
2011	"Huh?"	Released: 28 April; Label: Digital:Age; Format: MP3, 320 kbit/s
2011	"Breathe"	Wildstylez & Alpha²; Released: 9 May; Label: A² records; Format: MP3, 320 kbit/s
2011	"Back 2 Basics"	Released: 12 May; Label: Digital:Age; Format: MP3, 320 kbit/s
2011	"Into the Light"	Released: 2 June; Label: Digital:Age; Format: MP3, 320 kbit/s
2012	"Lose My Mind"	Wildstylez & Brennan Heart; Released: 21 May; Label: Brennan Heart Music; Format: Mp3, 320 kbit/s
2012	"World of Madness (Defqon.1 Festival 2012 Anthem)"	Wildstylez, Headhunterz & Noisecontrollers; Released: 16 August; Label: Q-Dance; Format: MP3, 320 kbit/s
2012	"Year of Summer"	Released: 5 November; Label: Q-Dance; Format: MP3, 320 kbit/s
2012	"Leave It All Behind" (feat. DV8 Rocks!)	Wildstylez & Alpha²; Released: 14 November; Label:A² Records; Format: MP3, 320 kbit/s
2012	"True Rebel Freedom (Defqon.1 Australia 2012 Anthem)"	Released: 26 November; Label: Q-Dance; Format: MP3, 320 kbit/s
2012	"What It's Like"	Wildstylez & Atmozfears; Released: 3 December; Label: Scantraxx; Format: MP3, 320 kbit/s
2013	"Timeless"/"Soundstorm"/"Forever!"	Released: 18 February; Label: Q-Dance; Format: MP3, 320 kbit/s
2013	"Lights Go Out" (feat. Cimo Fränkel)	Released: 15 September; Label: Lose Control Music; Format: MP3, 320 kbit/s
2013	"Lose Control" (feat. Frankie McCoy)	Wildstylez & Max Enforcer; Released: 30 September; Label: Lose Control Music; Format: MP3, 320 kbit/s
2014	"Straightforward"/"Back to History (Intents 2013 Anthem)"	Released: 24 June; Label: Lose Control Music; Format: MP3, 320 kbit/s
2014	"Falling to Forever"	Feat. Noah Jacobs; Released: 11 July; Label: Lose Control Music; Format: MP3, 320 kbit/s
2015	"Lies or Truth"	Wildstylez & Brennan Heart; Released: 12 October; Label: WE R; Format: MP3, 320 kbit/s
2017	"Here I Come"	Coone & Wildstylez; Released: 13 October; Label: Dirty Workz; Format: MP3, 320 kbit/s
2017	"Temple of Light"	Released: 20 November; Label: Q-dance; Format: MP3, 320 kbit/s
2018	"Colours of the Night"	Wildstylez feat. Michael Jo; Released: 15 January; Label: Lose Control Music; Format: MP3, 320 kbit/s
2018	Children of Drums EP	Released: 18 May; Label: Art of Creation; Format: MP3, 320 kbit/s
2018	"Shine a Light"	Hardwell and Wildstylez featuring KiFi; Released: 22 June; Label: Revealed Recordings; Format: MP3, 320 kbit/s
2019	"Run with the Wolves"	Wildstylez and E-Life; Released: 25 January; Label: Art of Creation; Format: MP3, 320 kbit/s
2019	"Wolves Cry"	Wildstylez and D-Block & S-te-fan; Released: 21 March; Label: Art of Creation; Format: MP3, 320 kbit/s
2019	"Into the Wild"	Wildstylez featuring KiFi; Released: 10 October; Label: Art of Creation; Format: MP3, 320 kbit/s
2019	200 Dreams EP	Wildstylez and Noisecontrollers; Released: 5 December; Label: Art of Creation; Format: MP3, 320 kbit/s
2020	"Exist"	Wildstylez and TNT; Released: 6 February; Label: Art of Creation; Format: MP3, 320 kbit/s
2020	"Adrenaline"	Wildstylez and Da Tweekaz featuring Xception; Released: 12 March; Label: Art of Creation; Format: MP3, 320 kbit/s
2020	"Never Bring Us Down"	Wildstylez and Aftershock featuring Lxcpr; Released: 23 April; Label: Art of Creation; Format: MP3, 320 kbit/s
2020	"Deeper Than the Ocean"	Wildstylez; Released: 16 July; Label: Art of Creation; Format: MP3, 320 kbit/s
2021	"Edge of Darkness"	Wildstylez and Hard Driver; Released: 14 May; Label: Art of Creation; Format: MP3, 320 kbit/s

== Remixes ==
Year	Title
2008	Tuneboy – Dirty (Wildstylez Remix)
2008	The Masochist – LDMF (Wildstylez Remix)
2009	Noisecontrollers – Venom (Wildstylez Remix)
2009	Headhunterz and Wildstylez Present: Project One – Numbers (Wildstylez Remix)
2010	Ambassador Inc. – Put This On YouTube (Wildstylez Remix)
2010	Brennan Heart – Just As Easy (Wildstylez & SMD Remix)
2011	K-Traxx – Little Red Noisy Thing (Wildstylez Remix)
2011	D-Block & S-te-Fan – Music Made Addict (Headhunterz and Wildstylez Remix)
2012	Tatanka – Let's Rock (Wildstylez Remix)
2012	Coldplay – Every Teardrop Is A Waterfall (Wildstylez Bootleg Based on Avicii Remix)
2013	Rigby – Earth Meets Water (Wildstylez Remix)
2013	Krewella and Nicky Romero – Legacy (Wildstylez Remix)
2013	Hardwell and Dyro featuring Bright Lights – Never Say Goodbye (Wildstylez Remix)
2014	Vamps – The Jolly Roger (Wildstylez Remix)
2014	R3hab featuring Eva Simons – Unstoppable (Wildstylez remix)
2015	MAKJ and Thomas Newson – Black (Wildstylez Remix)
2017	Armin Van Buuren and Vini Vici featuring Hilight Tribe – Great Spirit (Wildstylez Remix)
2018	W&W and Vini Vici – Chakra (Wildstylez Remix)
2018	Evil Activities and Endymion featuring E-Life - Broken (Wildstylez Remix)
2019	Showtek featuring Leon Sherman - Listen to Your Momma (Wildstylez Remix)
2019	R3hab and Vini Vici featuring Pangea & Dego - Alive (Wildstylez Remix)
2020	Edward Maya featuring Vika Jigulina - Stereo Love (Wildstylez Remix)
2021	D-Block & S-Te-Fan - Fired Up (Wildstylez Remix)
