= Audiotricz =

Dutch electronic dance music duo

- Origin: Nunspeet, Gelderland, Netherlands
- Genres: Hardstyle
- Years active: 2013–present
- Labels: Scantraxx Recordz, Revealed Recordings, Mainstage Music, Spinnin' Records, Spirit of Hardstyle
- Members: Leon Benschop; Kenneth Kroes
- Website: www.audiotricz.com

Audiotricz (pronounced "audio tricks") are a Dutch electronic music duo from Nunspeet, consisting of Kenneth Kroes and Leon Benschop who perform and produce music together within the hardstyle genre.

== History ==
Leon and Kenneth have known each other since they were young children as they grew up as friends and began producing Hardstyle together in 2013. Both Leon and Kenneth had a background in sound design in other genres prior to becoming a duo and producing hardstyle.

On 28 June 2013, Audiotricz signed to Dutch hardstyle record label Scantraxx Recordz and celebrated with their first release "We Are Audiotricz EP" which featured three tracks: "Dance No More" with Atmozfears, "Don't Hold Back" and "Dreamliner". Since their first release, they have grown quickly within the Hardstyle scene and have gained support from highly recognized artists within Hardstyle such as TNT (Technoboy and Tuneboy), The Prophet and Noisecontrollers, who invited Audiotricz as a supporting act on his 2015 All Around Australian Tour.

Since the conception of Audiotricz, they have gained spots at hardstyle events such as Defqon.1, Qlimax, Hard Bass, XXlerator Outdoor, Mysteryland Chile and represented Scantraxx Recordz at the Hard Dance Event Live in the Heineken Music Hall during Amsterdam Dance Event.

== Releases ==
Name	Date	Release Label	Other Information
It Could Be	08/04/2013	International Hard Dance Sessions	
We Are As One	08/04/2013	International Hard Dance Sessions	
We Are Audiotricz EP	15/07/2013	Scantraxx Recordz	Including singles: Audiotricz & Atmozfears "Dance No More" "Don't Hold Back" and "Dreamliner"
Feel Good	19/08/2014	Scantraxx Recordz	With Bass Modulators
Reborn	18/11/2013	Scantraxx Recordz	
Infinite	27/01/2014	Scantraxx Recordz	
Momentum	03/03/2014	Scantraxx Recordz	Featuring John Harris
Conquer The World	25/04/2014	Scantraxx Recordz	With The Prophet
Never Leaving	21/06/2014	Scantraxx Recordz	Featuring Miss Palmer
Dare You	08/08/2014	Revealed Recordings	By: Hardwell ft. Matthew Koma (Audiotricz Remix)
Ghettoblaster	27/08/2014	Scantraxx Recordz	With TNT (AKA, Technoboy & Tuneboy)
Raise Your Hands	18/10/2014	Scantraxx Recordz	With Atmozfears
Tonight Will Never Die	01/12/2014	WE R	By: Brennan Heart and Code Black (Audiotricz Remix)
Reawakening	23/02/2015	Scantraxx Recordz	With Atmozfears
Turn The Music Up	12/06/2015	Mainstage Music	With Wildstylez
A Broken Story	12/06/2015	Lose Control Music	
United As One	03/07/2015	Scantraxx Recordz	Official Wish Outdoor 2015 Anthem
Alchemy Of Hardstyle	23/11/2015	Scantraxx Recordz	
VIII	01/01/2016	Q-Dance Records	Official Freaqshow Anthem
What About Us	16/10/2016	Scantraxx Recordz	
Ipanema	02/01/2017	Spinnin' Records	By: Bolier (Audiotricz Remix)
A New Dawn	30/01/2020	Art of Creation	
