= Coone =

Belgian music producer and DJ

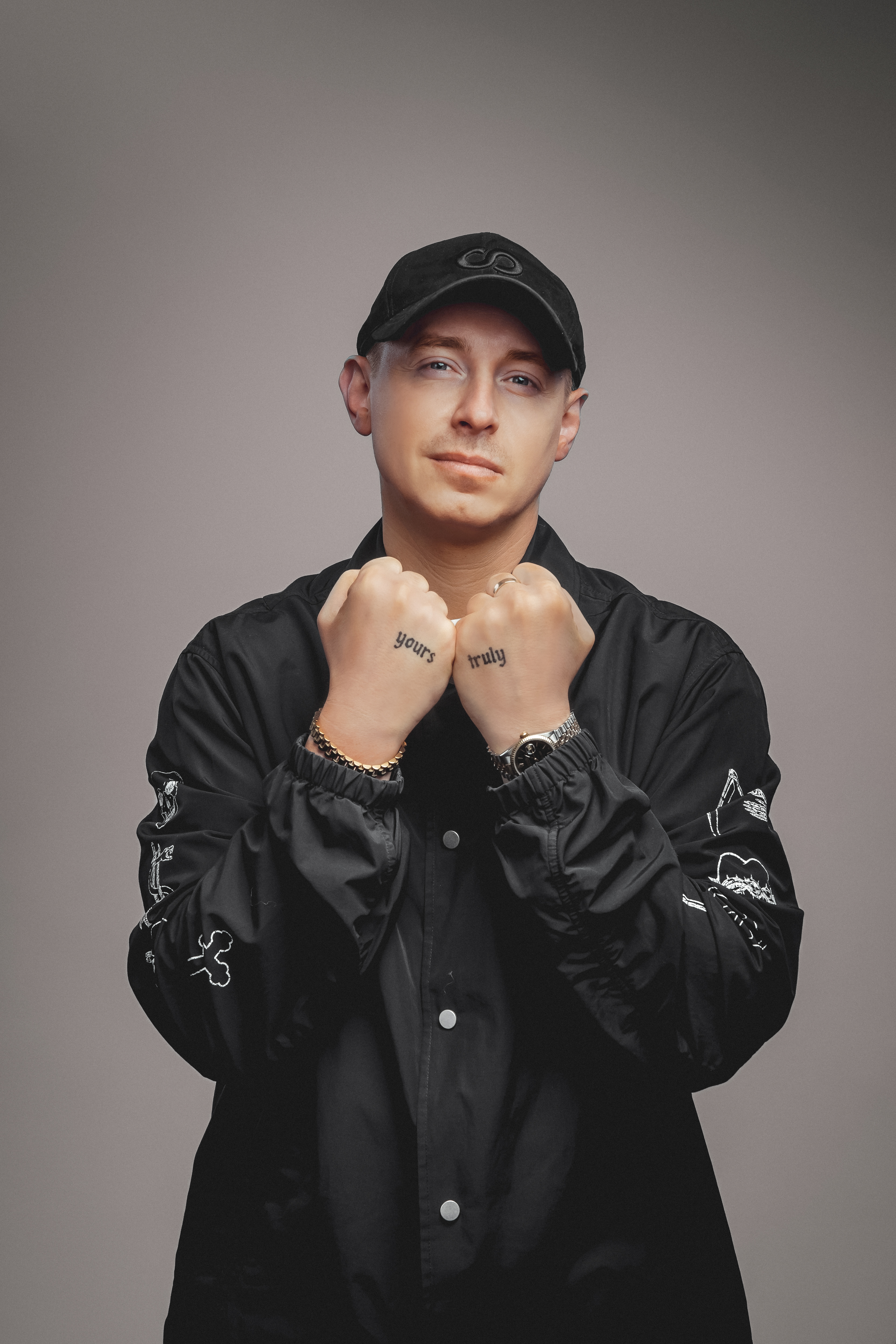
- Coone in 2026

Background information
- Also known as: Coone; DJ Coone
- Born: Koen Bauweraerts; 30 May 1983 (age 43)
- Origin: Turnhout, Belgium
- Genres: Hardstyle
- Years active: 1998-
- Labels: Dirty Workz, Dim Mak
- Website: djcoone.com

Koen Bauweraerts (born 30 May 1983), better known by his stage name Coone, is a Belgian hardstyle producer and DJ.

== Career ==
Coone first started producing in 1998 at age 15. He released his first EP in 2002, Protect the Innocent. Under the pseudonym "The Artist Also Known As", he broke out into the scene with "Eating Donuts", a remix of "Song 2" by Blur. In 2006, he initiated his very first label Dirty Workz, which released Jump and Hardstyle music – but since 2015 has taken a more background role in the operation of the label, which is now primarily based around Hardstyle. In addition, he has been featured in DJ MAG's Top 100 DJ's with his first entry at #41 in 2011.

In the passing few years, Coone has worked with many leading artists, and in 2014 co-signed with Dim Mak Records (Steve Aoki's label) for upcoming music, in co-operation with Dirty Workz.

In 2013, Coone teamed up with fellow Belgian's Dimitri Vegas & Like Mike to produce the festival hit entitled "Madness" which featured vocals from Lil Jon, which was released on Dim Mak Records. This led to further Coone releases on Dim Mak Records in the lead up to his album Global Dedication – which was released in November 2013. Coone collaborated with Steve Aoki on a song entitled "Can't Stop the Swag" and also made a remix for Linkin Park X Steve Aoki "A Light That Never Comes" in January 2014.

In 2015, Coone started a monthly podcast called "Global Dedication". Coone was ranked #49 in the DJ Mag 2015 Top 100 DJs making him the highest ranked Hardstyle DJ.

In 2016 Coone released his album Less Is More.

In 2018, he was the first hardstyle artist ever to play on the mainstage of Tomorrowland.

In 2020, during the Covid-19 pandemic, Coone released another album Loyalty Is Everything.

== Achievements ==
=== DJ Mag Top 100 ===
- 2011 - #41 - New Entry
- 2012 - #37
- 2013 - #45
- 2014 - #48
- 2015 - #49 - Highest ranked in Hardstyle
- 2016 - #57
- 2017 - No entry
- 2018 - No entry
- 2019 - No entry
- 2020 - No entry

== Discography ==
=== Albums ===
- 2008 - My Dirty Workz
- 2009 - Dirty Workz Deluxe
- 2011 - The Challenge
- 2013 - Global Dedication
- 2016 - Less Is More
- 2018 - Trip to Tomorrow
- 2021 - Loyalty Is Everything
- 2023 - A New Decade

=== EP ===
- 2006 - Gonna C*m

=== Singles ===
- DJ Coone - "Protect the Innocent" (2002)
- DJ Coone - "And the Beat Goes On" (2003)
- DJ Coone - "The Name of My DJ" (2003)
- DJ Coone - "Getting Down" (2005)
- DJ Coone - "Love" / "Nord Station" (2005)
- DJ Coone - "Cracked" / "Life Is Complex" (2006)
- FVL - "Violin de la Nuit - Violin de la Nuit" (Performed by Mr. Pink aka DJ Coone) (2006)
- DJ Coone - "Infected (Reverze Anthem)" (2006)
- Coone and Ghost - "Pitch Up" (2006)
- Coone - "Bounce on Ya Sneakerz" / "Keep It Whoat" (2007)
- Coone - "The Chosen One" (2007)
- Coone - "The Return (Remixes)" (2007)
- Coone featuring Mr. Eyez - "Words from the Gang" (2007)
- Justin Tenzz - "Electric Housecleaner" (2007)
- Coone - "Doggystyle" / "Gonna Cum (Ronald-V Remix)" (2008)
- Coone and Ruthless - "We Don't Care" (2008)
- Coone - "Xpress Yourself" / "My Dirty Workz" (2008)
- Coone - "Feelings in My Head" (2008)
- Coone - "Throw Ya Handz" / "Twilight Zone" (2010)
- Coone / Coone and Ruthless - "A Million Miles" / "D.E.N.S." (2010)
- Coone - "The Undefeated" (2010)
- Coone - "Starf*ckers" / "Fearless" (2010)
- Psyko Punkz vs. Coone - "Dirty Soundz (Ra-Ta-Ta)" (2010)
- Coone featuring Scope DJ - "Travelling" (2011)
- Coone featuring Da Tweekaz - "D.W.X" (2011)
- Coone featuring Nikkita - "Monstah" (2011)
- Coone - "The Prime Target" (2011)
- Coone featuring Zatox - "Audio Attack" (2011)
- Coone featuring Scope DJ - "Free Again" (2012)
- Coone - "Chapter 20.12" (2012)
- Coone - "Music Is Art" (2012)
- Coone - "Dedication" (2012)
- Coone - "Chapter 20.12" (2012)
- Coone - "Nustyle Crap" (2012)
- Coone - "Headbanger" (2013)
- Coone - "Colors of Life" (2013)
- Coone featuring Kritikal - "Zombie Killer" (2013)
- Coone featuring K19 - "Times Gettin' Hard" (2013)
- Steve Aoki and Coone - "Can't Stop the Swag" (2014)
- Coone - "Survival of the Fittest" (2014)
- Coone - "Into the Madness" (2014)
- Coone - "Aladdin on E" (2014)
- Coone, Hard Driver and E-life - "Swoosh Fever" (2015)
- Coone and Dr Rude featuring K19 - "For the World" (2015)
- Coone - "Love for the Game" (2015)
- Coone, Bassjackers and Gldy Lx - "Sound Barrier" (2015)
- Coone and Max Enforcer - "Love X Hate" (2015)
- Coone featuring MC Sik-Wit-It - "THIS" (2015)
- Coone - "Deception (Reverze 2016 Anthem)" (2016)
- Coone and Hard Driver - "It's All in the Game (Intents 2016 Anthem)" (2016)
- Coone - "Rise of the Celestials (Qlimax 2016 Anthem)" (2016)
- Coone and Da Tweekaz - "D.W.X (10 Years Dirty Workz Mix)" (2016)
- Coone - "Monstah (Fanatics Remix)" (2016)
- Coone - "Young, Gifted & Proud (The Qontinent 2017 Anthem)" (2017)
- Coone and Wildstylez - "Here I Come" (2017)
- Coone and Hard Driver - "Showtime 2.0" (2017)
- Coone featuring Ragga Twins - "Jack Who? (Straight Fire Remix)" (2017)
- Coone featuring Jelle van Dael - "Superman" (2018)
- Coone - "Dedicated to the Core (Defqon.1 Australia 2018 Anthem)" (2018)
- Coone and Ummet Ozcan and Villain - "Trash Moment" (2018)
- Coone and TNT featuring Technotronic - "Pump Up the Jam" (2018)
- Coone - "Never Alone" (2018)
- Coone - "Evolution Is Here" (2018)
- Coone featuring David Spekter - "Now or Never" (2019)
- Coone and Sub Zero Project - "Face of a Champion" (2019)
- Coone, Da Tweekaz, and Hard Driver - "Power of Perception (Reverze Anthem 2020)" (2020)
- Coone, Psyko Punkz, and KELTEK - "Arriba" (2020)
- Coone and Brennan Heart - "Fine Day" (2020)
- Coone, Hard Driver and Da Tweekaz - "The Sound Of" (2020)
- Coone and ATILAX - "Loyalty Is Everything" (2020)
- Coone, Da Tweekaz, Hard Driver and Bram Boender - "Toss a Coin to Your Witcher" (2020)
- Coone - "Wanna Play House" (2020)
- Coone - "Beat of the Drum" (2020)
- Coone and Zatox - "I Like to Move It" (2021)
- Coone feat. Dominique Young Unique - "BOSS" (2021)
- Coone - "Insanity" (2021)
- Coone feat. Joe Killington - "Painkiller" (2021)

=== Other songs ===
- Coone — "The Nutcracker" (2020)

=== Remixes ===
- Dimitri Vegas & Like Mike, Moguai — "Mammoth (Coone Remix)" (2014)
- Dimitri Vegas & Like Mike, Vini Vici and Liquid Soul — "Untz Untz (Coone Remix)" (2019)
- Carnage, Nazaar and Murda — "Blitzkrieg (Coone Remix)" (2020)
