= Brennan Heart =

Dutch DJ and hardstyle producer

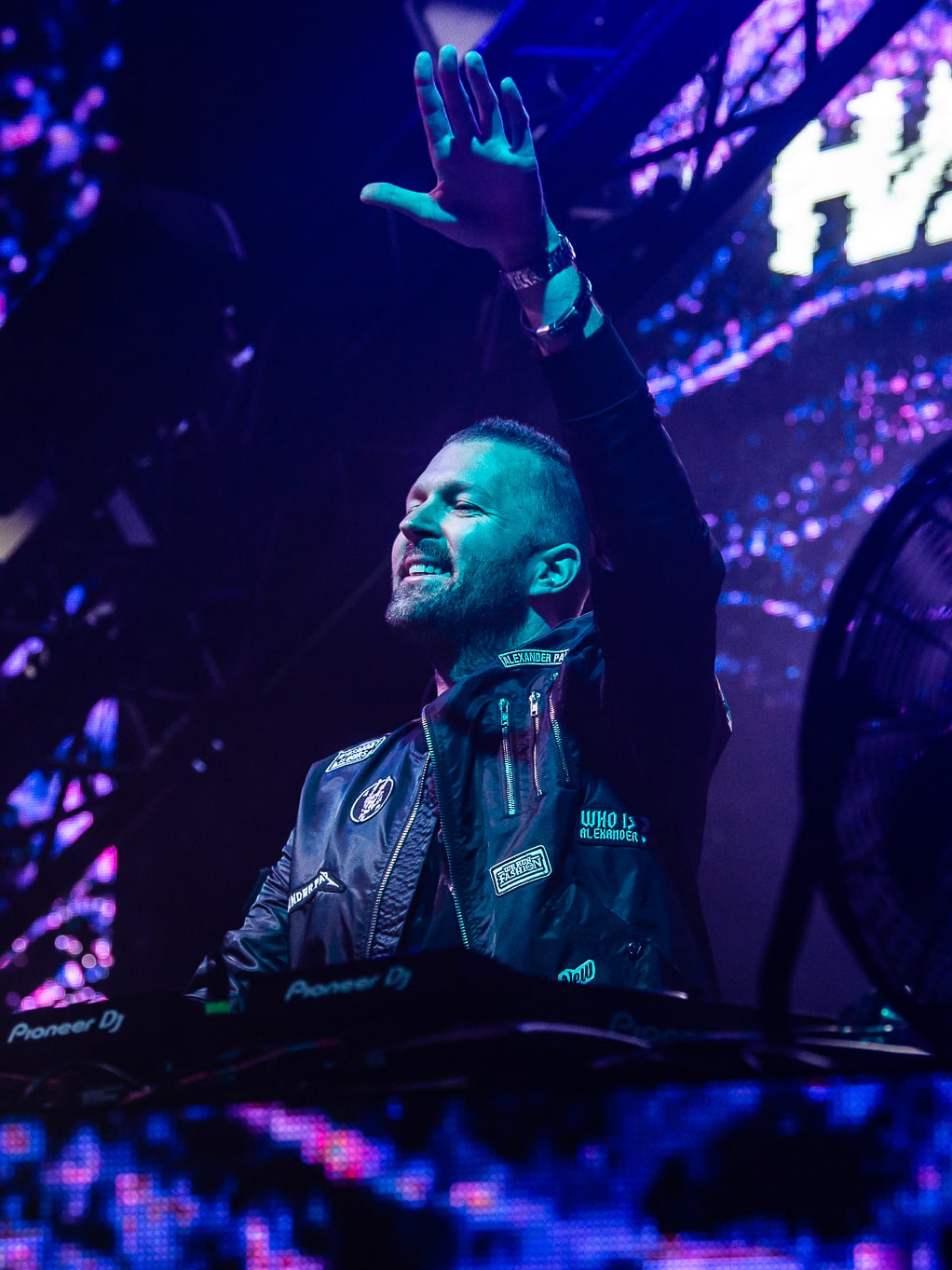
- Brennan Heart live on stage at Austria Goes ZRCE

Background information
- Also known as: Brennan Heart, Blademasterz
- Born: Fabian Bohn; 2 March 1982 (age 44); Helden, Limburg, Netherlands
- Origin: Netherlands
- Genres: Hardstyle
- Occupations: DJ; record producer; remixer
- Instruments: Piano; keyboards; mixer; synthesizer; FL Studio
- Years active: 2001-now
- Labels: Scantraxx (2006–2012); WE R Music (2012–2020); I AM HARDSTYLE (Now)
- Website: Official Site

Fabian Bohn (born 2 March 1982), known professionally as Brennan Heart, is a Dutch DJ and hardstyle producer.

== Career ==
=== Brennan & Heart ===
In 2002, Fabian Bohn co-founded with Pieter Heijnen (known as DJ Thera) a duo named Brennan & Heart concentrating on making hardstyle music, after having experimented with various styles of music like techno, hard trance and tech trance. After more than three years of cooperation, the duo split and went their own ways, with Bohn taking the name Brennan Heart and Pieter Heijnen continuing as DJ Thera.

=== Solo ===
Bohn, now Brennan Heart, continued producing hardstyle music after the split. In 2006, Brennan Heart joined the Dutch label Scantraxx Records (created by The Prophet). Under that banner, Brennan Heart created his own sublabel M!D!FY in May 2006.

In 2009, he released his first album as a solo artist, Musical Impressions. In 2014, he released the second album, Evolution of Style, which featured Imaginary, featuring Jonathan Mendelsohn and Lose My Mind, featuring his good friend Wildstylez, that has become smash-hit overnight. In 2016, two years after the last album release, he dropped his third album where I AM HARDSTYLE was born. The year after, he released his fourth album, On Demand.

In 2019, ten years after his first album he released his fifth album Show Your True Colors. A little more than one year later during the global pandemic he decided to release his sixth album Brennan Heart & Friends where he worked with artists like Kayzo, Armin van Buuren, and many more.

The year 2021 was a year to celebrate 20 years in the business with his seventh album Brennan Heart 20 Yrs containing 4 CDs of his best music over the past 2 decades.

=== WE R Music and I AM HARDSTYLE ===
In 2012, he left Scantraxx Records and established his own music label Brennan Heart Music. He rebranded his own label as WE R Music later adding two other extra full labels WE R Raw and WE R Tomorrow. Code Black, Toneshifterz and Outbreak decided to join forces in 2013 by joining WE R Music.

He later founded I Am Hardstyle as not just a record label, but also a brand. Currently, this label has include the member from previously founded WE R Music, along with the recently launched I Am Hardstyle Amplify, where he will recruits next-gen Hardstyle Artists.

=== Radio show ===
A monthly radio show at the Dutch radio station SLAM!FM was broadcast every Thursday under the general title WE R Hardstyle. The second Thursday of every month is presented by Fabian Bohn. MC Villain broadcasts the first Thursdays of the month, with D-Block & S-te-Fan taking the third Thursday and Digital Punk the fourth Thursday of the month.

The WE R Hardstyle radio show was later changed into I AM HARDSTYLE Radio which is presented from their radio studio including a guest mix each month.

== Albums ==
Title	Year	Label
Musical Impressions	2009	M!D!FY
M!D!F!LEZ (DJ Tools Only)	2010	Scantraxx
Evolution of Style	2014	WE R
On Demand	2017	WE R
Show Your True Colors	2019	I AM HARDSTYLE
Brennan Heart & Friends	2020	I AM HARDSTYLE
Brennan Heart 20 Years	2021	I AM HARDSTYLE
Save Euphoric	2024	I AM HARDSTYLE

== Discography ==
Full discography including his aliases and releases under the former Brennan & Heart name.

Artist	Title	Label	Releasedate
2005
DJ Zemtec	"Amen (Brennan & Heart's Techstyle Remix)"	Seismic Records	2005
Marcello Moreno	"Wauze Style (Brennan & Heart Minimal Re-Style Mix)"	Turning Wheel Records	2005
Brennan & Heart	"We Are Possessed (Brennan's Fear Remix)"	Zero 2 Nine Records	01-03-2005
Brennan & Heart	"Revolution 029"	Zero 2 Nine Records	01-03-2005
Cosmic Gate	"Fire Wire (Brennan & Heart's Hardstyle Remix)"	Whitelabel	03-03-2005
Superwave	"Difference (Blademasterz Rmx)"	Pow! Recordings	01-06-2005
Superwave	"Difference (Original)"	Pow! Recordings	01-06-2005
Superwave	"The Difference (Attic & Acesone Rmx)"	Pow! Recordings	01-06-2005
The Prophet & DJ Duro	"Shizzle The Rmx (Brennan & Heart Rmx)"	Scantraxx	22-08-2005
Philippe Rochard	"Air Drum (Blademasterz Remix)"	ETX Editiontraxx	29-10-2005
Blademasterz	"Masterblade"	Scantraxx	09-12-2005
2006
The Horrorist	"Flesh Is the Fever (Brennan Heart's Minimal Re-edit)"	Zero 2 Nine Records	03-01-2006
Dark Oscillators	"Nasty Jungle (Brennan Heart M.F.G. Remix)"	BLQ Records	01-03-2006
Unknown Analoq	"Blackout (Brennan Heart Remix)"	M!D!FY	02-06-2006
Unknown Analoq	"MFG"	M!D!FY	02-06-2006
The Prophet & Brennan Heart	"Payback"	M!D!FY	01-09-2006
The Prophet & Brennan Heart	"Attakk"	M!D!FY	01-09-2006
Brennan Heart	"Rev!val X"	M!D!FY	01-09-2006
Brennan Heart	"Cult Music (Technoboy Remix)"	M!D!FY	01-09-2006
Brennan Heart	"Evolut!on of Style (Part 1)"	M!D!FY	01-11-2006
Brennan Heart	"B!nary Confl!ct"	M!D!FY	01-11-2006
2007
Alpha2 vs Brennan Heart	"Innocence (Exclusive Qlimax DJ-Tool)"	Cloud 9	08-01-2007
Coone	"The Chosen One (Brennan Heart Rmx)"	Zoo Records	10-01-2007
Showtek	"No Harder (Brennan Heart Remix)"	Dutch Master Works	19-04-2007
Brennan Heart	"Rush the Rmx"	M!D!FY	23-04-2007
Brennan Heart	"We Are Possessed (Headhunterz Remix)"	M!D!FY	23-04-2007
Brennan Heart AKA Blademasterz	"One Blade"	M!D!FY	01-05-2007
Brennan Heart AKA Blademasterz	"Equal Phunk"	M!D!FY	01-05-2007
Brennan Heart	"Get Wasted (Defqon.1 Festival Anthem 2007) (Brennan Heart vs JDX Mix)"	Q-Dance	29-06-2007
Brennan Heart	"Get Wasted (Defqon.1 Festival Anthem 2007) (Blademasterz Rmx)"	Q-Dance	29-06-2007
Deepack	"Here's Johnny (Brennan Heart Remix)"	Hardcopy Records	28-08-2007
2008
Brennan Heart	"Faith in Your DJ"	M!D!FY	12-03-2008
Brennan Heart	"Revival X (Showtek Remix)"	M!D!FY	12-03-2008
Brennan Heart	"Memento"	M!D!FY	21-05-2008
Brennan Heart	"Remember, Remember..."	M!D!FY	21-05-2008
Brennan Heart	"Pitchin' (Original)"	Scantraxx	25-06-2008
Blademasterz	"Masterblade (Start of the Acid War RMX)"	Scantraxx	25-06-2008
Brennan Heart	"Revival X RM-X (Reverze 2006 Edit)"	Scantraxx	25-06-2008
The Prophet & Brennan Heart	"Payback (Testmix 3)"	Scantraxx	25-06-2008
Unknown Analoq	"Triplet Overkill"	Scantraxx	25-06-2008
Brennan Heart ft Shanokee	"Home (Blademasterz Rmx)"	M!D!FY	04-07-2008
Brennan Heart ft Shanokee	"Home (Unknown Analoq Rmx)"	M!D!FY	04-07-2008
Brennan Heart ft Shanokee	"Homeless"	M!D!FY	04-07-2008
Brennan Heart meets Clive King	"Fearless"	M!D!FY	29-07-2008
Brennan Heart meets Clive King	"Wooloomooloo"	M!D!FY	29-07-2008
2009
Brennan Heart	"For Years (Intro)"	Scantraxx	15-07-2009
Brennan Heart ft Shanokee	"Feel U Here"	Scantraxx	15-07-2009
Brennan Heart	"Face the Enemy"	Scantraxx	15-07-2009
Brennan Heart	"Rockstar DJ"	Scantraxx	15-07-2009
Brennan Heart	"Muzik Bizz"	Scantraxx	15-07-2009
Brennan Heart	Musical Impressions	Scantraxx	15-07-2009
Brennan Heart	"Just as Easy"	Scantraxx	15-07-2009
Brennan Heart	"We Come and We Go"	Scantraxx	15-07-2009
Brennan Heart	"Ancient Beat"	Scantraxx	15-07-2009
Brennan Heart	"I Love Haters"	Scantraxx	15-07-2009
Brennan Heart	"Can't Kill Us"	Scantraxx	15-07-2009
Brennan Heart	"Audiometric (2009 Album Mix)"	Scantraxx	15-07-2009
Brennan Heart	"Push Play!"	Scantraxx	15-07-2009
Brennan Heart ft. Max P	"About Time"	Scantraxx	15-07-2009
Brennan Heart aka Blademasterz	"One Blade (Noisecontrollers Rmx)"	Scantraxx	15-07-2009
Brennan Heart ft. Shanokee	"Feel U Here (The Viper & G-Town Madness Rmx)"	Scantraxx	15-07-2009
Brennan Heart	"City of Intensity (Decibel Anthem 2009)"	M!D!FY	17-08-2009
Brennan Heart	"City of Intensity (Blademasterz Dub Mix)"	M!D!FY	17-08-2009
Headhunterz	"The Sacrifice (Brennan Heart RMX)"	Scantraxx Reloaded	02-11-2009
2010
Brennan Heart	"Revelations (Reverze 2010 Anthem)"	M!D!FY	24-02-2010
Brennan Heart	"Revelations (Endymion Remix)"	M!D!FY	24-02-2010
Headhunterz & Brennan Heart	"The MF Point of Perfection (Original Dubstyle Mix)"	Scantraxx	08-03-2010
Brennan Heart & Wildstylez	"Reputation Game"	Scantraxx	19-04-2010
Brennan Heart	"Just as Easy (Wildstylez & SMD Remix)"	M!D!FY	28-05-2010
The Viper & G-Town Madness	"Come as One (Brennan Heart Remix)"	Viper Beatz	25-06-2010
Blademasterz	"In the End"	Scantraxx	12-07-2010
Brennan Heart	"LSD (Love, Sadness & Desire)"	Scantraxx	12-07-2010
Brennan Heart	"Van Halen Is a Rockstar"	Scantraxx	12-07-2010
DJ Zany	"Pure (Brennan Heart RMX)"	Scantraxx	12-07-2010
Brennan Heart	"This Is Not..."	Scantraxx	12-07-2010
Brennan Heart & Frontliner	"Search for More (Demo Mix)"	Scantraxx	12-07-2010
Brennan Heart	"One-Master-Blade"	Scantraxx	12-07-2010
Brennan Heart	"M!D!Mash Prt II"	Scantraxx	12-07-2010
The Beholder & Balistic	"Decibel Anthem 2002 (Brennan Heart Edit)"	Scantraxx	12-07-2010
Unknown Analoq	"Acid & Dubstyle"	Scantraxx	12-07-2010
Brennan Heart	"Memento (Ivan Carsten 2010 Vocal Mix)"	Scantraxx	12-07-2010
Brennan Heart	"FIYD (Blademasterz RMX)"	Scantraxx	12-07-2010
Unknown Analoq	"Like Your Style"	Scantraxx	12-07-2010
Brennan Heart AKA Blademasterz	"Zaag Tool Scantraxx Live"	Scantraxx	12-07-2010
Brennan Heart	"Revival Mash Up"	Scantraxx	12-07-2010
Brennan Heart & A-lusion	"Don't Speak"	Scantraxx	12-07-2010
Brennan Heart	"Watch Me Grow (Qrimetime DJ Tool)"	Scantraxx	12-07-2010
Brennan Heart AKA Blademasterz	"Secret of the Blade (Live Act Mix)"	Scantraxx	12-07-2010
Brennan Heart	"Face the Enemy (Decibel Edit)"	Scantraxx	12-07-2010
Brennan Heart	"Audiometric (Qlimax 2009 Mix)"	Scantraxx	12-07-2010
Brennan Heart	"M.!.D.!.F.Y. (Hardbass Tool)"	Scantraxx	12-07-2010
Brennan Heart	"Remember, Remember Qlimax 2009 (Outro Edit)"	Scantraxx	12-07-2010
Brennan Heart	"Alternate Reality (Qlimax Anthem 2010)"	Q-Dance	04-12-2010
Brennan Heart	"Alternate Reality (Evil Activities & Endymion Remix)"	Q-Dance	04-12-2010
2011
Zany & Brennan Heart	"Bang the Bass"	Fusion Records	10-01-2011
Brennan Heart & The Prophet	"Wake Up!"	M!D!FY	21-03-2011
Brennan Heart & The Prophet	"Wake Up! (Snooze Edit)"	M!D!FY	21-03-2011
Brennan Heart	"Face the Enemy (Zany Rmx)"	M!D!FY	21-03-2011
Brennan Heart	"Till U Believe It"	M!D!FY	21-03-2011
Brennan Heart	"Light the Fire (2011 Mix)"	M!D!FY	29-08-2011
Brennan Heart	"Memento (Bioweapon Remix)"	M!D!FY	12-09-2011
Brennan Heart	"Musical Impressions (Toneshifterz Remix)"	M!D!FY	12-09-2011
TNT & Brennan Heart	"Punk Fanatic (Original Mix)"	Titanic Records	08-12-2011
TNT & Brennan Heart	"Punk Fanatic (Technoboy Vs. Tuneboy Brass Mix)"	Titanic Records	08-12-2011
Blademasterz	"Secret of the Blade"	FREE	25-12-2011
2012
Brennan Heart & Wildstylez	"Lose My Mind"	Brennan Heart Music	21-05-2012
Brennan Heart	"Running Late"	Brennan Heart Music	11-06-2012
Brennan Heart	"Lift Me Up"	Brennan Heart Music	11-06-2012
Brennan Heart	"We Can Escape (Intents Anthem 2012)"	Brennan Heart Music	02-07-2012
Brennan Heart	"What's It Gonna Be (City2City 2012 Mix)"	Brennan Heart Music	26-08-2012
Brennan Heart	"Running Late (Brennan Heart & Code Black MF Earthquake Rawmix)"	Brennan Heart Music	26-08-2012
Brennan Heart	"Life That We Dream Of (City2City)"	Brennan Heart Music	24-09-2012
2013
Brennan Heart	"Freaqshow (2012 Anthem)"	Q-Dance	02-01-2013
Brennan Heart	"Never Break Me"	Brennan Heart Music	06-05-2013
Brennan Heart	"F.I.F.O."	WE R	02-09-2013
Brennan Heart & Jonathan Mendelsohn	"Imaginary"	WE R	23-09-2013
2014
Brennan Heart	"Evolution Continues"	WE R	10-01-2014
Brennan Heart	"Miles (End Credit Song)"	WE R	10-01-2014
Brennan Heart	"We Come & We Go (WE R EOS Mix)"	WE R	10-01-2014
Code Black & Brennan Heart	"Tonight Will Never Die"	WE R	10-01-2014
Brennan Heart	"Privilege 2 Be Born Again"	WE R	10-01-2014
Brennan Heart	"Scrap the System (Defqon.1 Australia Anthem 2013)"	WE R	10-01-2014
Brennan Heart ft. Shanokee	"Wide Awake (EOS 2013 Mix)"	WE R	10-01-2014
Brennan Heart & Zatox	"Fight the Resistance"	WE R	10-01-2014
Brennan Heart	"Hardbass Junkie"	WE R	10-01-2014
Brennan Heart	"F.I.F.O. (Outbreak Remix)"	WE R	10-01-2014
Brennan Heart	"Evolution Continues (EOS Intro)"	WE R	10-01-2014
Brennan Heart	"A Scattered Soul"	WE R	10-01-2014
Brennan Heart	"Never Break Me (Toneshifterz Remix)"	WE R	10-03-2014
Afrojack ft. Wrabel	"Ten Feet Tall (Brennan Heart & Code Black Remix)"	Universal Music	17-05-2014
Unknown Analoq	"Blackout (B-Front Remix)"	A2 Records	14-07-2014
Zatox & Brennan Heart	"Back in the Days"	Q-Dance	14-11-2014
Code Black & Brennan Heart	"Tonight Will Never Die (Audiotricz Remix)"	WE R	01-12-2014
Dimitri Vegas & Like Mike ft. Wolfpack	"Ocarina (Brennan Heart Remix)"	Smash The House	12-12-2014
2015
Brennan Heart	"Outta My Way"	WE R	09-02-2015
Brennan Heart	"Illumination (Reverze 2015 Anthem)"	Reverze	13-02-2015
Brennan Heart & Jonathan Mendelsohn	"Follow the Light"	WE R	23-03-2015
Brennan Heart & Toneshifterz & DV8 Rocks!	"My Identity"	WE R	27-04-2015
Brennan Heart	"Hardbass Junkie (Digital Punk Remix)	WE R RAW"	08-06-2015
Brennan Heart	"Outta My Way (Endymion Remix)"	WE R RAW	22-06-2015
Brennan Heart	"Outta My Way (Sub Sonik Remix)"	WE R RAW	22-06-2015
Brennan Heart & Wildstylez	"Lies or Truth"	WE R	12-10-2015
Dimitri Vegas & Like Mike ft. Ne-Yo	"Higher Place (Brennan Heart & Toneshifterz Remix)"	Smash The House	20-10-2015
Blademasterz	"Masterblade (Radical Redemption Remix)"	Cloud 9 Dance	10-11-2015
2016
Brennan Heart & Audiotricz ft. Christon	"Coming Home"	WE R	21-03-2016
Brennan Heart Feat. Jonathan Mendelsohn	"Be Here Now"	WE R	03-06-2016
Brennan Heart	"Gateway to Eternity"	WE R	03-06-2016
Brennan Heart	"On 3 2 1 (GO!)"	WE R	03-06-2016
Brennan Heart	"Hold On to Tomorrow"	WE R	03-06-2016
Brennan Heart & Toneshifterz	"Don't Stop Rockin'"	WE R	03-06-2016
Brennan Heart	"Leaving Us Behind"	WE R	03-06-2016
Brennan Heart	"MMVIII (Redefine Perfection) (Blademasterz Edit)"	WE R	03-06-2016
Brennan Heart	"Fire in the Sky"	WE R	03-06-2016
Brennan Heart & TNT	"It's My Style"	WE R	03-06-2016
Brennan Heart & Zatox	"God Complex"	WE R	03-06-2016
Brennan Heart & Sub Sonik	"Double Dare"	WE R	03-06-2016
Brennan Heart Feat. Far East Movement & Casey K	"Novacain"	WE R	03-06-2016
Brennan Heart aka Blademasterz	"Still Here"	WE R	03-06-2016
Brennan Heart & Wildstylez	"Lies or Truth (Hardbass Edit)"	WE R	03-06-2016
Brennan Heart & Audiotricz	"Coming Home (Galactixx Remix)"	WE R	03-06-2016
Brennan Heart & Dailucia	"Fck on Coc4ine (Radical Redemption Remix)"	WE R	03-06-2016
Brennan Heart Feat. Jonathan Mendelsohn	"Imaginary (Live Edit)"	WE R	03-06-2016
Brennan Heart AKA Blademasterz	"In the End (Dailucia Remix)"	WE R	03-06-2016
Brennan Heart & Dailucia	"Fck on Coc4ine"	WE R	03-06-2016
Crypsis	"Break Down Low (Brennan Heart Remix)"	Minus Is More	24-09-2016
Dimitri Vegas & Like Mike vs. Ummet Ozcan	"The Hum (Brennan Heart Remix)"	Smash The House	16-12-2016
2017
Brennan Heart, Code Black & Jonathan Mendelsohn	"Broken"	WE R	04-08-2017
Brennan Heart aka Blademasterz	"Melody of the Blade"	WE R	04-08-2017
Brennan Heart	"Just Get In"	WE R	04-08-2017
Brennan Heart & Galactixx ft Elle B	"Dreamer"	WE R	04-08-2017
Brennan Heart & TNT	"Hard Knockin' Beats"	WE R	04-08-2017
Brennan Heart aka Blademasterz	"The Golden Era"	WE R	04-08-2017
Brennan Heart aka Blademasterz	"Secret of the Blade (Brennan Heart & Sound Rush 2017 Remix)"	WE R	04-08-2017
Brennan Heart aka Blademasterz	"Time & Space (Kick 'n Bass)"	WE R	04-08-2017
Brennan Heart	"The Projeqt (2017 Anthem)"	WE R	04-08-2017
Brennan Heart aka Blademasterz	"One Blade (10 Years Live Version)"	WE R	04-08-2017
Brennan Heart & Crypsis	"Outta My Break Down Low"	WE R	04-08-2017
A*S*Y*S	"Acid Nightmare (Blademasterz Remix)"	WE R	04-08-2017
Dimitri Vegas & Like Mike vs. David Guettaa ft. Kiara	"Complicated (Brennan Heart Remix)"	Epic Amsterdam	13-10-2017
2018
Brennan Heart ft. Trevor Guthrie	"Won't Hold Me Down (Gravity)"	WE R	18-02-2018
Brennan Heart & Toneshifterz	"Define Yourself (I AM HARDSTYLE 2018 Anthem)"	WE R	22-03-2018
Brennan Heart & Jonathan Mendelsohn	"Coming Back to You"	WE R	13-04-2018
Tiësto & Sevenn	"BOOM (Brennan Heart Remix)"	Universal Music	04-05-2018
Brennan Heart & TNT	"Hard Knockin' Beats (2018 Edit)"	WE R	07-05-2018
Brennan Heart & Rebourne	"Ravers Memory"	WE R	21-06-2018
Brennan Heart	"Fuelled by Fanatics (Official Decibel Anthem 2018)"	B2S Records	05-07-2018
Armin van Buuren	"Blah Blah Blah (Brennan Heart & Toneshifterz Remix)"	Armada	06-07-2018
Brennan Heart	"Life Begins (Blademasterz Edit)"	WE R	09-07-2018
Dimitri Vegas & Like Mike ft. Wiz Khalifa	"When I Grow Up (Dimitri Vegas .& Like Mike vs Brennan Heart VIP Mix)"	Smash The House	29-07-2018
Brennan Heart & Galactixx	"Partyfreak"	Smash The House	05-10-2018
2019
Brennan Heart ft. Mattanja Joy Bradley	"Need to Feel"	I AM HARDSTYLE	22-03-2019
Brennan Heart	"If You Fall, I'll Catch You"	I AM HARDSTYLE	22-03-2019
Brennan Heart	"Show Your True Colors (I AM HARDSTYLE 2019 Anthem)"	I AM HARDSTYLE	22-03-2019
Brennan Heart & TNT	"Realness"	I AM HARDSTYLE	22-03-2019
Brennan Heart	"Outcasts"	I AM HARDSTYLE	22-03-2019
Brennan Heart	"Harddrop"	I AM HARDSTYLE	22-03-2019
Brennan Heart & Dutch Force	"Deadline"	I AM HARDSTYLE	22-03-2019
Brennan Heart & Coone ft. Max P	"Fight for Something"	I AM HARDSTYLE	22-03-2019
Brennan Heart	"In Your Face (HardBass)"	I AM HARDSTYLE	22-03-2019
Brennan Heart ft. Max P	"About Time Again"	I AM HARDSTYLE	22-03-2019
Brennan Heart & Wildstylez	"Reputation Game (Toneshifterz & Code Black Remix)"	I AM HARDSTYLE	22-03-2019
Brennan Heart & Zatox	"Fight the Resistance (Aftershock Remix)"	I AM HARDSTYLE	22-03-2019
R3hab x A Touch Of Class	"All Around The World (La La La) (Brennan Heart Remix)"	CYB3RPVNK	27-09-2019
Dimitri Vegas & Like Mike vs Ummet Ozcan & Brennan Heart	"Beast (All as One)"	Smash The House	15-11-2019
Steve Aoki & Backstreet Boys	"Let It Be Me (Brennan Heart Remix)"	Ultra Music	08-11-2019
2020
Brennan Heart & Christon ft. Metropole Orkest	"Hold On to Tomorrow"	WE R	06-01-2020
Brennan Heart ft. Enina	"Born & Raised (I AM HARDSTYLE 2020 Anthem)"	I AM HARDSTYLE	31-01-2020
Coone & Brennan Heart	"Fine Day"	WE R	27-03-2020
Armin van Buuren & Brennan Heart ft. Andreas Moe	"All on Me"	Armada	24-04-2020
Armin van Buuren & Brennan Heart ft. Andreas Moe	"All on Me (Brennan Heart VIP Mix)"	Armada	01-05-2020
Brennan Heart ft. Jake Reese	"Lose It All"	I AM HARDSTYLE	28-05-2020
Brennan Heart & Jake Reese	"Lose It All (Bobby Rock Mix)"	I AM HARDSTYLE	18-06-2020
Brennan Heart	"Outcasts (Toneshifterz & Code Black Remix)"	WE R	25-06-2020
Jerome	"Jupiter (Brennan Heart remix)"	Kontor Records	28-08-2020
Brennan Heart, Toneshifterz & Dailucia	"Time Is Now (I AM HARDSTYLE in Concert Theme)"	I AM HARDSTYLE	17-09-2020
Brennan Heart & Psyko Punkz	"Everything We Are"	I AM HARDSTYLE	22-10-2020
Brennan Heart X Harris & Ford	"Addicted to the Bass"	I AM HARDSTYLE	06-11-2020
Brennan Heart x Kayzo	"Untouchable"	I AM HARDSTYLE	12-11-2020
Brennan Heart & Jonathan Mendelsohn	"Journey"	I AM HARDSTYLE	20-11-2020
Brennan Heart aka Blademasterz	"Katana"	I AM HARDSTYLE	20-11-2020
Brennan Heart & The Pitcher	"When Tomorrow Comes"	I AM HARDSTYLE	20-11-2020
Brennan Heart, Rebourne & Toneshifterz	"Heroes & Legends"	I AM HARDSTYLE	20-11-2020
Brennan Heart & Code Black ft. Armen Paul	"Take Your Pain"	I AM HARDSTYLE	20-11-2020
Brennan Heart & Audiotricz ft. Mikel Franco	"Stand Together"	I AM HARDSTYLE	20-11-2020
Brennan Heart & Max P	"Prayer"	I AM HARDSTYLE	20-11-2020
Brennan Heart & B-Front	"The Code"	I AM HARDSTYLE	20-11-2020
Dimitri Vegas & Like Mike X Armin van Buuren X Brennan Heart Feat. Jeremy Oceans	"Christmas Time"	Smash The House	20-11-2020
Dimitri Vegas & Like Mike X Armin van Buuren X Brennan Heart Feat. Jeremy Oceans	"Christmas Time (Hardstyle Mix)"	Smash The House	25-12-2020
2021
Steve Aoki & Brennan Heart ft. PollyAnna	"Close to You"	Dim Mak	22-01-2021
Brennan Heart & Jake Reese	"Lose It All (2021 DJ Edit)"	I AM HARDSTYLE	01-02-2021
Brennan Heart & Jake Reese	"Lose It All (Jerome Remix)"	I AM HARDSTYLE	01-02-2021
Brennan Heart & B-Front	"The Code"	I AM HARDSTYLE	18-02-2021
Brennan Heart presents Blademasterz	"Shape of the Heart"	I AM HARDSTYLE	08-04-2021
Brennan Heart presents Blademasterz x Dana	"Oldskool & Acid (Original Mix)"	I AM HARDSTYLE	08-04-2021
Brennan Heart presents Blademasterz	"Katana (EP Version)"	I AM HARDSTYLE	08-04-2021
Brennan Heart presents Blademasterz	"True Nature (EP Version)"	I AM HARDSTYLE	08-04-2021
Brennan Heart presents Blademasterz x Dana	"Oldskool & Acid (Dana Mix)"	I AM HARDSTYLE	08-04-2021
Brennan Heart presents Blademasterz	"Katana (Main Theme)"	I AM HARDSTYLE	08-04-2021
Brennan Heart & Jonathan Mendelson	"Journey"	I AM HARDSTYLE	29-04-2021
Brennan Heart & Jonathan Mendelson	"Journey (Thyron Remix)"	I AM HARDSTYLE	29-04-2021
Brennan Heart & Jonathan Mendelson	"Journey (Clockartz Remix)"	I AM HARDSTYLE	29-04-2021
Brennan Heart & Jonathan Mendelson	"Journey (2021 Edit)"	I AM HARDSTYLE	29-04-2021
Brennan Heart & The Pitcher	"When Tomorrow Comes (Extended Mix)"	I AM HARDSTYLE	17-05-2021
Brennan Heart, Rebourne & Toneshifterz	"Heroes & Legends (Extended Mix)"	I AM HARDSTYLE	17-05-2021
Brennan Heart & Code Black ft. Armen Paul	"Take Your Pain (Extended Mix)"	I AM HARDSTYLE	17-05-2021
Brennan Heart & Audiotricz ft. Mikel Franco	"Stand Together (Extended Mix)"	I AM HARDSTYLE	17-05-2021
Brennan Heart	"MF Real"	I AM HARDSTYLE	20-05-2021
Brennan Heart	"Way of Life"	I AM HARDSTYLE	27-05-2021
Tungevaag	"Ride with Me (ft. Kid Ink) (Brennan Heart Remix)"	Spinnin Records	02-07-2021
Brennan Heart	"Thunder"	I AM HARDSTYLE	10-09-2021
Delerium ft. Sarah McLachlan	"Silence (Brennan Heart Remix)"	I AM HARDSTYLE	07-10-2021
Delerium ft. Sarah McLachlan	"Silence (Brennan Heart & Dailucia Hard Edit)"	I AM HARDSTYLE	07-10-2021
Brennan Heart ft. Enina	"Born to Fit In"	I AM HARDSTYLE Amplify	02-12-2021
2022
Brennan Heart	"Time Will Tell (Reverze Anthem 2022)"	I AM HARDSTYLE	24-02-2022
Brennan Heart ft. Jay Mason	"Story of Tomorrow"	I AM HARDSTYLE	24-03-2022
Brennan Heart & Clockartz	"What You Give Is What You Get"	I AM HARDSTYLE	28-04-2022
Brennan Heart & Dimitri Vegas & Like Mike	"Because the Night"	Smash The House	28-05-2022
Brennan Heart & Warface (ft. Max P)	"Sacrifice"	I AM HARDSTYLE	09-06-2022
Yellow Claw & Weird Genius (ft. Novia Bachmid)	"Lonely (Brennan Heart Remix)"	Barong Family	01-07-2022
Brennan Heart	"Da Langste Nacht (Remix)"	I AM HARDSTYLE	22-07-2022
Brennan Heart & Wildstylez	"WKND!"	Q-Dance	18-08-2022
Brennan Heart	"Belong"	I AM HARDSTYLE	06-10-2022
MYST	"Before You Walk with Kings (Brennan Heart's Tribute Mix)"	I AM HARDSTYLE	06-10-2022
Brennan Heart & Ben Nicky (ft. Maikki)	"Make Some Noize"	I AM HARDSTYLE	27-10-2022
Brennan Heart, Dimitri Vegas & Like Mike, Timmy Trumpet	"Sweet Caroline"	Smash the House	11-11-2022
Steve Aoki & KAAZE (ft. John Martin)	"Whole Again (Dimitri Vegas & Like Mike & Brennan Heart Remix)"	DIM MAK	22-11-2022
2023
Brennan Heart & Roland Clark	"It's All About the Music"	I AM HARDSTYLE	24-02-2023
Brennan Heart & Tony Junior	"What's Up?"	I AM HARDSTYLE	14-04-2023
Brennan Heart & Phuture Noize	"When Daylight Strikes"	Intents Records	18-05-2023
Brennan Heart (ft. Mingue)	"Rising Up"	I AM HARDSTYLE	28-07-2023
Brennan Heart & SHWAY	"Solo"	I AM HARDSTYLE	04-10-2023
Brennan Heart & Coone (ft. Max P	"Forgive Me"	Dirty Workz	03-11-2023
Brennan Heart & Trevor Guthrie	"Lose You Tonight"	Be Yourself Music	16-11-2023

-
