= I'm Lonely =

I'm Lonely may refer to:

- "I'm Lonely" (Scooter song) from their 2007 album Jumping All Over the World
- "I'm Lonely (But I Ain't That Lonely Yet)", song by The White Stripes from their 2005 album Get Behind Me Satan

== See also ==
- "Leave Me Alone (I'm Lonely)", Pink song
- I am lonely will anyone speak to me, the title of a thread that was posted on the Internet forum of the video codec downloads site Moviecodec.com, and had become "the web's top hangout for lonely people
