= Jumping All Over the World =

Studio album by Scooter
- Released: 30 November 2007
- Recorded: 2007
- Studio: Sheffield Underground Studios
- Genres: Jumpstyle; hardstyle
- Length: 49:30
- Label: Sheffield Tunes
- Producers: H.P. Baxxter; Rick J. Jordan; Michael Simon; Jens Thele

Scooter chronology
The Ultimate Aural Orgasm (2007)	Jumping All Over the World (2007)	Under the Radar Over the Top (2009)

Singles from Jumping All Over the World
- 1. "The Question Is What Is the Question?" Released: 10 August 2007; 2. "And No Matches" Released: 23 November 2007; 3. "Jumping All Over the World" Released: 1 February 2008; 4. "I'm Lonely" Released: 18 April 2008

Alternative cover
- 2008 UK cover

Singles from Jumping All Over the World – Whatever You Want
- 1. "Sheffield Jumpers - Jump With Me" Released: 28 August 2008; 2. "Jump That Rock (Whatever You Want)" Released: 26 September 2008

Professional ratings
Review scores
Source	Rating
AllMusic	4/5 stars

Jumping All Over the World is the thirteenth studio album by German techno group Scooter, released in Germany in 2007. Five singles have been released from it: "The Question Is What Is the Question?", "And No Matches", "Jumping All Over the World", a remix of "I'm Lonely" and a new version of "Jump That Rock!" titled "Jump That Rock (Whatever You Want)" recorded with British rock group Status Quo. The album's original artwork features people performing Jumpstyle.

A revised version of the album was released in the UK in 2008, their first album release in that country since The Stadium Techno Experience in 2003. It entered the UK Albums Chart at number 1, replacing Madonna's album Hard Candy, and is their highest ever charting release there. On 30 May 2008 it was certified Gold by the BPI and on 22 August 2008 it was certified Platinum.

On 3 October 2008 a new version of Jumping All Over the World was released, titled Jumping All Over the World – Whatever You Want.

== Track listing ==
1. "The Definition" – 1:25
2. "Jumping All Over the World" – 3:48
3. "The Question Is What Is the Question?" – 3:46
4. "Enola Gay" – 3:59
5. "Neverending Story" – 3:52
6. "And No Matches" – 3:31
7. "Cambodia" – 5:23
8. "I'm Lonely" – 4:02
9. "Whistling Dave" – 3:39
10. "Marian" (Version) – 4:55
11. "Lighten Up the Sky" – 6:19
12. "The Hardcore Massive" – 4:25
13. "Jump That Rock!" (UK only) – 3:50
14. "The Greatest Difficulty" – 0:20

The UK edition of the album features one extra track, "Jump That Rock!", the radio edit of "I'm Lonely" replacing the original, and a new version of "Lighten Up the Sky".

=== Limited edition ===
A limited edition version of the album comes with a second CD that includes Scooter's 20 German top-ten hits so far. This 2-CD version was released as standard in the UK, but with an alternative first track.

1. "Apache Rocks the Bottom!" (UK only)
2. "One (Always Hardcore)"
3. "Shake That!"
4. "Jigga Jigga!"
5. "Maria (I Like It Loud)"
6. "The Night"
7. "Weekend!"
8. "Nessaja"
9. "The Logical Song"
10. "Posse (I Need You on the Floor)"
11. "Faster Harder Scooter"
12. "How Much is the Fish?"
13. "Fire"
14. "I'm Raving"
15. "Rebel Yell"
16. "Back in the U.K."
17. "Endless Summer"
18. "Friends"
19. "Move Your Ass!"
20. "Hyper Hyper"

Bonus track

- "The Question is What is the Question?" [Headhunters Remix]

=== Jumping All Over the World – Whatever You Want ===
An updated version of the album was released in October 2008, titled Jumping All Over the World – Whatever You Want. This version was meant to be a German re-release of the UK version, containing the second compilation CD. However, this version contains selected tracks from the Hands On Scooter album & "Jump That Rock (Whatever You Want)" replacing the original "Jump That Rock" from the original UK release. The Limited Deluxe Edition contains two CDs and two DVDs, the Premium edition contains the two CDs and the live DVD, whilst the Standard Edition consists of only the two CDs. In the UK a 'Platinum Edition' was released on November 17 featuring the original album plus Jump That Rock (Whatever You Want), the live DVD and the missing tracks from the greatest hits CD from the first release of the album.

- CD 1: Jumping All Over the World – Whatever You Want
1. "The Definition"
2. "Jumping All Over the World"
3. "The Question is What is the Question?"
4. "Enola Gay"
5. "Neverending Story"
6. "And No Matches"
7. "Cambodia"
8. "I'm Lonely" (Single Version)
9. "Whistling Dave"
10. "Marian" (Version)
11. "Lighten Up the Sky" (New Version)
12. "The Hardcore Massive"
13. "The Greatest Difficulty"
14. Bloodhound Gang – "Weekend!" (Bonus: Hands on Scooter)
15. K.I.Z – "Was kostet der Fisch? (How Much is the Fish?)" (Bonus: Hands on Scooter)
16. Sido – "Beweg dein Arsch (Move Your Ass)" (Bonus: Hands on Scooter)
17. Modeselektor feat. Otto von Schirach – "Hyper Hyper" (Bonus: Hands on Scooter)
18. Jan Delay & Moonbootica – "I'm Raving" (Bonus: Hands on Scooter)
19. Andreas Dorau – "Aiii Shot the DJ" (Bonus: Hands on Scooter)
20. Klostertaler – "Friends" (Bonus: Hands on Scooter)
- CD 2: The Ultimate Singles Collection
1. Scooter vs. Status Quo – "Jump That Rock (Whatever You Want)"
2. "One (Always Hardcore)"
3. "Shake That!"
4. "Jigga Jigga!"
5. "Maria (I Like It Loud)"
6. "The Night"
7. "Weekend!"
8. "Nessaja"
9. "The Logical Song"
10. "Posse (I Need You on the Floor)"
11. "Faster Harder Scooter"
12. "How Much is the Fish?"
13. "Fire"
14. "I'm Raving"
15. "Rebel Yell"
16. "Back in the UK"
17. "Endless Summer"
18. "Friends"
19. "Move Your Ass!"
20. "Hyper Hyper"
21. Sheffield Jumpers – "Jump with Me" (bonus track)
- DVD 1: Live in Berlin 2008^{1}
1. "Intro"
2. "Call Me Mañana"
3. "Jumping All Over the World"
4. "The Question is What is the Question?"
5. "I'm Raving"
6. "Weekend!"
7. "And No Matches"
8. "Jump That Rock"
9. "No Fate"
10. "Jumpstyle Medley" featuring Sheffield Jumpers
11. "Fuck the Millennium"
12. "Aiii Shot the DJ"
13. "Nessaja"
14. "How Much is the Fish?"
15. "I'm Lonely"
16. "One (Always Hardcore)"
17. "Jigga Jigga!"
18. "Maria (I Like It Loud)"
19. "Hyper Hyper!"

Notes

- ^{1} Live concert at Zitadelle Spandau, Berlin filmed 1 August 2008 and previously broadcast on VIVA.
- DVD 2: The Complete Video Collection
1. "Jump That Rock (Whatever You Want)"
2. "I'm Lonely"
3. "Jumping All Over the World"
4. "And No Matches"
5. "The Question is What is the Question?"
6. "Lass uns Tanzen"
7. "Behind the Cow"
8. "Apache Rocks the Bottom!"
9. "Hello! (Good to be Back)"
10. "Suavemente"
11. "One (Always Hardcore)"
12. "Shake That!"
13. "Jigga Jigga!"
14. "Maria (I Like It Loud)"
15. "The Night"
16. "Weekend!"
17. "Nessaja"
18. "The Logical Song"
19. "Aiii Shot the DJ"
20. "Posse (I Need You on the Floor)"
21. "She's the Sun"
22. "I'm Your Pusher"
23. "Fuck the Millennium"
24. "Faster Harder Scooter"
25. "Call Me Mañana"
26. "I Was Made for Lovin' You"
27. "We are the Greatest"
28. "How Much is the Fish?"
29. "No Fate"
30. "The Age of Love"
31. "Fire"
32. "Break It Up"
33. "I'm Raving"
34. "Rebel Yell"
35. "Let Me be Your Valentine"
36. "Back in the U.K."
37. "Endless Summer"
38. "Friends"
39. "Move Your Ass!"
40. "Hyper Hyper"

The limited deluxe edition also comes with a T-shirt and autograph card (only the first 1000 copies were handwritten, other copies were printed).

=== 20 Years of Hardcore bonus content ===
CD2

1. "The Question is What is the Question" (A Little Higher Club Mix)
2. "The Question is What is the Question" (Alex K Remix)
3. "The Question is What is the Question" (Flip & Fill Remix)
4. "The Fish is Jumping"
5. "The Question is What is the Question" (Micky Modelle Remix)
6. "The Question is What is the Question" (Headhunters Mix)
7. "Up in Smoke"
8. "Jumping All Over the World" (The Jacques Renault Club Mix)
9. "Tribal Tango"
10. "Jumping All Over the World" (Alex K Remix)
11. "Jumping All Over the World" (Fugitive 80s Style Remix)

CD3

1. "And No Matches" (Fresh Off the Plane Club Mix)
2. "B.O.B."
3. "I'm Lonely" (Dressed for Success Club Mix)
4. "Way Up North"
5. "I'm Lonely" (Styles & Breeze Remix)
6. "I'm Lonely" (Flip 'n Fill Remix)
7. "I'm Lonely" (Alex K Remix)
8. "Jump That Rock (Whatever You Want)" (The Telecaster Club Mix)
9. "The Hi Hat Song"
10. "Jump That Rock (Whatever You Want)" (Jorg Schmid Remix)

== Tour ==
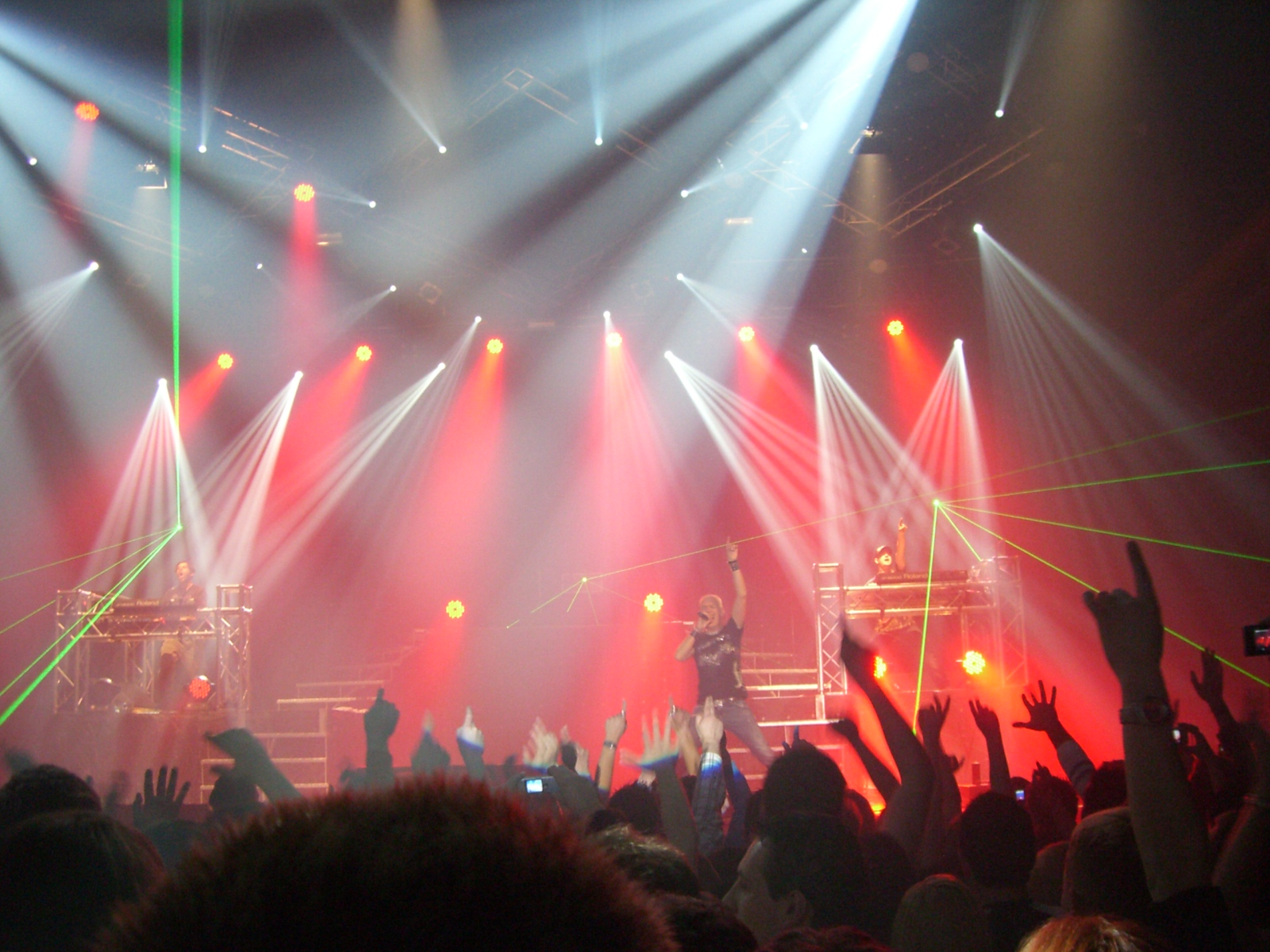
Scooter in Munich

The Jumping All Over The World Tour was a tour that promoted Jumping All Over the World. It featured of 36 concerts (including the Clubland Live! Tour later that year) it featured 5 different countries Germany, Austria, Switzerland, Czech Republic and Russia and spread from 6 March 2008 to 20 December 2008 They were accompanied by Dutch jumpstyle group Scooter Jumpers (as they were known then), this was inevitably the tour that associated them with Scooter. the Scooter Jumpers performed Whatever You Want using guitars during this tour, while doing jumpstyle, this eventually made the song Jump That Rock (Whatever You Want). This tour also featured brand new versions of songs, including the new version of I'm Lonely.

The tour featured 4 sections, in the United Kingdom, Clubland TV was just released in 2008, later Clubland created a tour called Clubland Live!, which featured the biggest electronic dance groups, including Scooter and German eurodance group Cascada. In December 2008 they ended up performing in England due to the fact that the album had gone gold and opened at the top of the album charts.

=== Tours track listing ===
According to the Sheffield Tunes website, this was the track listing for the tour

1. Intro (Tiesto — Ten Seconds Before Sunrise, Carmina Burana - O Fortuna + L.A. Style - James Brown Is Dead
2. Call Me Mañana
3. Jumping All Over the World
4. The Question Is What Is the Question?
5. I'm Raving
6. Weekend!
7. And No Matches
8. Jump That Rock
9. Jumpstyle Medley: Lighten Up The Sky + Jumping Project + Whistling Dave + Cambodia + Enola Gay
10. Ramp! (The Logical Song)
11. Fuck The Millennium
12. Nessaja
13. How Much Is the Fish?
14. I'm Lonely
15. One (Always Hardcore)
16. Jigga Jigga!
17. Maria (I Like It Loud)
18. Hyper Hyper + Move Your Ass!

Select shows featured Lass uns Tanzen that replaced a song.

=== Locations ===
==== Clubland Live! Tour ====
All locations are in the United Kingdom

1. Belfast (6 March 2008)
2. Aberdeen (7 March 2008)
3. Newcastle (8 March 2008)
4. London (12 March 2008)
5. Birmingham (13 March 2008)
6. Manchester (14 March 2008)
7. Glasgow (15 March 2008)
8. Belfast (27 November 2008)
9. Aberdeen (28 November 2008)
10. Glasgow (29 November 2008)
11. Newcastle (30 November 2008)
12. Sheffield (2 December 2008)
13. Birmingham (3 December 2008)
14. Manchester (4 December 2008)
15. Hull (5 December 2008)

==== Jumping All Over The World Tour ====
Tour was played in Germany, Austria, Czech Republic, Switzerland, Russia and United States

1. Karlsruhe, Germany (Schwarzwaldhalle) (27 March 2008)
2. Dresden. Germany (Schlachthof) (28 March 2008)
3. Leipzig, Germany (Haus Auensee) (29 March 2008)
4. Vienna, Austria (Arena) (31 March 2008)
5. Munich, Germany (Zenith) (1 April 2008)
6. Fürth, Germany (Stadthalle) (2 April 2008)
7. Zurich, Switzerland (Volkshaus) (3 April 2008)
8. Hamburg, Germany (Sporthalle) (5 April 2008)
9. Berlin, Germany (Columbiahalle) (6 April 2008)
10. Dortmund, Germany (Westfalenhalle) (7 April 2008)
11. Offenbach, Germany (Stadthalle) (9 April 2008)
12. Bremen, Germany (Pier 2) (10 April 2008)
13. Magdeburg, Germany (Stadthalle) (11 April 2008)
14. Cologne, Germany (Palladium) (12 April 2008)
15. Kazan, Russia (Club Ermitage) (1 May 2008) (CANCELLED) (CLUB TOUR)
16. Moscow, Russia (Tunning Hall) (2 May 2008) (CANCELLED) (CLUB TOUR)
17. Prague, Czech Republic (Small Sports Hall) (28 May 2008)
18. Berlin, Germany (Ziatdelle) (1 August 2008) (DVD)
19. Bonn, Germany (Museumsplatz) (8 May 2008) (CANCELLED)
20. New York, United States (Webster Hall) (15 August 2008)
21. Hartford, United States (Webster Theater) (16 August 2008)
22. Herford, Germany (Rathausplatz) (23 August 2008) (CANCELLED)
23. Moscow, Russia (SK ADRENALINE Club Space) (26 September 2008)
24. Düsseldorf, Germany (Philipshalle) (18 December 2008)
25. Bielefeld, Germany (Stadthalle) 20 December 2008)

== Charts ==
=== Weekly charts ===
Weekly chart performance for Jumping All Over the World
Chart (2007–2008)	Peak position
Austrian Albums (Ö3 Austria)	18
Czech Albums (ČNS IFPI)	29
German Albums (Offizielle Top 100)	9
Irish Albums (IRMA)	3
Scottish Albums (Official Charts)	1
Swiss Albums (Schweizer Hitparade)	65
UK Albums (Official Charts)	1

=== Year-end charts ===
Year-end chart performance for Jumping All Over the World
Chart (2008)	Position
German Albums (Offizielle Top 100)	33
UK Albums (OCC)	43

== Certifications ==
Certifications for Jumping All Over the World
Region	Certification	Certified units/sales
Germany (BVMI)	Gold	100,000^{‡}
United Kingdom (BPI)	Platinum	300,000^{^}
^{^} Shipments figures based on certification alone.^{‡} Sales+streaming figures based on certification alone.

== Notes ==
- "The Definition" takes its 'lyrics' directly from the Wikipedia article on jumping, set to the music of Boccherini's Menuet and Trio, from his String Quartet in E. This same piece of music is used on the final track "The Greatest Difficulty".
- "Jumping All Over The World" is based on the song "A Glass Of Champagne" by the pop group Sailor, taken from the 1975 album Trouble. The main melody also resembles that of "Rock Civilization" by Headhunterz.
- "The Question is What is the Question?" is based on 2006 song "How Do You Do" by Party Animals, the 2004 song "Frozen Flame" and 2007 song "Freefall" both by Jeckyll & Hyde and samples the song "How Do You Do" by Mouth & MacNeal, taken from the 1972 album of the same name.
- "Enola Gay" takes elements from the song of the same name by Orchestral Manoeuvres in the Dark, taken from the 1980 album Organisation.
- "Neverending Story" samples the theme song from the American version of the 1984 film The NeverEnding Story, composed by Giorgio Moroder and originally sung by Limahl from Kajagoogoo.
- "And No Matches" samples the 1998 song "Big Big World" by Emilia, taken from the 1999 album of the same name, and is based on the 2004 song "Frozen Flame" by Jeckyll & Hide.
- "Cambodia" is based on the song "Vietnam" by Vorwerk, which is itself based on the song "Cambodia" performed by Kim Wilde and written by Marty and Ricky Wilde, taken from the 1982 album Select.
- "I'm Lonely" samples the songs "Lonely" by Felix Project and "A Step Too Far" by Refresh. Single version of the song samples "Fly Away" by Vincent de Moor as well as "Thrill" by Ernesto vs Bastian. Later releases contain only the radio edit. On the "20 Years of Hardcore" re-release, the "Alex K Remix" of the song was shorter than the original release.
- "Whistling Dave" samples the Russian folk song "Korobeiniki", known as the theme music from the video game Tetris, specifically the Nintendo Game Boy version.
- "Marian (Version)" is a cover of the song by The Sisters of Mercy, taken from the 1985 album First and Last and Always.
- "Lighten Up the Sky" samples "Cumulus" by Polish trance project Nitrous Oxide, "Torrent" by Dave 202 and "Everybody" by Rick Tonic (second version only).
- "The Hardcore Massive" samples "FTS" by Showtek.
- "Jump That Rock!" is based on the song "1980 (Marshall Mix)" by Citizen, which is itself based on the 1979 Status Quo song "Whatever You Want" (taken from the album of the same name). It also samples the introduction to "Kick Out the Jams" by MC5 (taken from the 1969 album of the same name), as previously sampled by The KLF on their 1990 single "What Time Is Love? (Live at Trancentral)".
- The Sheffield Jumpers dance troupe were featured in the videos for all five singles from the album, exempting "I'm Lonely". They also accompanied Scooter on the Jumping All Over the World Tour.
