= Sheffield Jumpers =

The Jumpers
- Also known as: Scooter Jumpers (2008); Sheffield Jumpers (2009-2014)
- Origin: Rotterdam, Netherlands
- Genre: Jumpstyle
- Years active: 2008-present
- Label: Sheffield Tunes (formerly)
- Members: Pim Fontijn
- Past members: Kevin Lemans; Brian van der Parre; Tom Kegel; Vince Clark; Remco Sanders; Sergej van Ettekoven

The Jumpers is a Dutch dance troupe and group of musicians from Rotterdam that practices the style of dance: Jumpstyle. They are well known for working with German electronic dance group Scooter. They were formerly called Scooter Jumpers, but H.P. Baxxter suggested "Sheffield Jumpers"

They gained popularity in the videos for "The Question Is What Is the Question?", "And No Matches", Jumping All Over the World" and "Jump That Rock (Whatever You Want)". In August 2008 they released their first single "Jump with Me" they toured with Scooter for their Jumping All Over the World Tour and Clubland Live in 2008. They once again toured in the Under the Radar Over the Top Tour in 2010, before they toured in The Big Mash Up Tour in 2011, they eventually split up with Scooter, according to band manager Jens Thiele, they ended up rebranding to The Jumpers

== Discography ==
=== Singles ===
| Year | Single | Peak chart positions | Album |
| Year | Single | Germany | Album |
|---|---|---|---|
| 2008 | "Jump with Me" | 69 | Jumping All Over the World - Whatever You Want by Scooter |

=== Music videos ===
| Year | Title | Director(s) |
|---|---|---|
| 2008 | "Jump with Me" | Framekiller & Dany Wild |
