= The Question Is What Is the Question? =

2007 single by Scooter

"The Question is What is the Question?"

Single by Scooter

from the album Jumping All Over the World
- B-side: "The Fish is Jumping"
- Released: 10 August 2007
- Genre: Jumpstyle
- Length: 3:46
- Label: Sheffield Tunes
- Songwriters: Harry van Hoof; Hans van Hemert; H. P. Baxxter; Rick J. Jordan; Michael Simon; Jens Thele
- Producers: Rick J. Jordan; Michael Simon

Scooter singles chronology
"Lass uns tanzen" (2007)	"The Question is What is the Question?" (2007)	"And No Matches" (2007)

"The Question is What is the Question?" is a song by German musical group Scooter. It was released as the first single from their 13th studio album, Jumping All Over the World. The B-side, "The Fish is Jumping", is a jumpstyle remix of "How Much Is the Fish?".

== Samples used ==
- "The Question is What is the Question?" interpolates the song "How Do You Do" by Mouth & MacNeal, taken from the 1972 album of the same name, and samples "I Like to Move It" by Reel 2 Real, the Think break, and Flamman & Abraxas' remix of "I Wanna Be a Hippy" by Technohead.
- "The Fish is Jumping" interpolates the song "Zeven Dagen Lang" by the Dutch band Bots. This same piece of music is used on the 1998 Scooter single "How Much is the Fish?", taken from the album No Time to Chill.

== Track listings ==
German CD maxi and download

1. "The Question is What is the Question?" (radio edit) – 3:46
2. "The Question is What is the Question?" ('A Little Higher' Clubmix) – 6:02
3. "The Question is What is the Question?" (extended) – 5:50
4. "The Fish is Jumping" – 3:50

12-inch

1. "The Question is What is the Question?" ('A Little Higher' Clubmix) – 6:02
2. "The Question is What is the Question?" (extended) – 5:50
3. "The Fish is Jumping" – 3:50

UK CD maxi and download

1. "The Question is What is the Question?" (radio edit) – 3:46
2. "The Question is What is the Question?" (extended) – 5:50
3. "The Question is What is the Question?" (Headhunters Remix) – 5:54
4. "The Question is What is the Question?" (Alex K Remix) – 6:28
5. "The Question is What is the Question?" (Flip & Fill Remix) – 5:50
6. "The Question is What is the Question?" (Micky Modelle Remix) – 6:49

== Charts ==
=== Weekly charts ===
Weekly chart performance for "The Question Is What Is the Question?"
Chart (2007–2008)	Peak position
Austria (Ö3 Austria Top 40)	2
Europe (Eurochart Hot 100)	19
Finland (Suomen virallinen lista)	4
Germany (GfK)	5
Hungary (Single Top 40)	4
Ireland (IRMA)	18
Netherlands (Single Top 100)	42
Scotland Singles (OCC)	11
Switzerland (Schweizer Hitparade)	83
UK Singles (OCC)	49

=== Year-end charts ===
Year-end chart performance for "The Question Is What Is the Question?"
Chart (2007)	Position
Austria (Ö3 Austria Top 40)	34
Germany (Media Control GfK)	31
