= And No Matches =

Single by Scooter

from the album Jumping All Over the World
- B-side: "Up in Smoke"
- Released: 23 November 2007
- Recorded: 2007
- Genre: Jumpstyle
- Length: 3:32
- Label: Sheffield Tunes
- Songwriters: Emilia; Yogi; H. P. Baxxter; Rick J. Jordan; Michael Simon; Jens Thele
- Producers: Rick J. Jordan, Michael Simon

Scooter singles chronology
"The Question Is What Is the Question?" (2007)	"And No Matches" (2007)	"Jumping All Over the World" (2008)

"And No Matches" is a single by German techno group Scooter. It was released as the second single from their 2007 album Jumping All Over the World.

== Music video ==
The "And No Matches" music video features the Sheffield Jumpers performing Jumpstyle to the chorus while shots of H.P. Baxxter comprise the lyrical parts of the music video.

== Samples ==
- "And No Matches" samples the 1998 song "Big Big World" by Emilia, taken from the 1999 album of the same name.
- The song along with "Enola Gay" from the same album samples part of the drum beat to the original Orchestral Manoeuvres in the Dark version of "Enola Gay".

== Track listings ==
CD maxi

1. "And No Matches" (Radio Version) – 3:32
2. "And No Matches" ('Fresh Off the Plane' Club Mix) – 6:33
3. "And No Matches" (Extended Version) – 5:35)
4. "Up in Smoke" – 5:07
5. "And No Matches" (The Video) – 3:32

12"

1. "And No Matches" (Extended Version) – 5:35
2. "And No Matches" ('Fresh Off the Plane' Club Mix) – 6:33

Download

1. "And No Matches" (Radio Version) – 3:32
2. "And No Matches" ('Fresh Off the Plane' Club Mix) – 6:33
3. "And No Matches" (Extended Version) – 5:35
4. "Up in Smoke" – 5:07

== Charts ==
Chart performance for "And No Matches"
Chart (2007–2008)	Peak position
Austria (Ö3 Austria Top 40)	20
European Hot 100 Singles (Billboard)	43
Germany (GfK)	9
Netherlands (Single Top 100)	62
Romania (Romanian Top 100)	59
