= Jump with Me =

Single by Sheffield Jumpers
- B-side: "Rock da House"
- Released: 28 August 2008
- Recorded: 2008
- Genre: Jumpstyle
- Length: 3:48
- Label: Sheffield Tunes (Germany)
- Songwriters: Hans van Hemert and Piet Souer (as Janschen & Janschens)

"Jump with Me" is the first single of the Dutch jumpstyle group Sheffield Jumpers, released on 28 August 2008. A music video was also produced for the single, featuring all the jumpers. The track samples the song "Trojan Horse" by Dutch pop trio Luv'. "Jump with Me" was featured as a bonus track on the Jumping All Over the World - Whatever You Want album by Scooter, and a multitude of jumpstyle compilations.

== Track listing ==
CD single

No.	Title	Length
1.	"Jump with Me (Radio Edit)"	3:48
2.	"Jump with Me (Club Edit)"	5:24
3.	"Rock da House"	4:00
4.	"Jump with Me (Video)"	3:17

Digital download

No.	Title	Length
1.	"Jump with Me (Radio Edit)"	3:48
2.	"Jump with Me (Club Edit)"	5:24
3.	"Rock da House"	4:00

== Credits ==
1. Janschen & Janschens
2. Janschen & Janschens
3. Dave ''Bass'' Parker (H.P. Baxxter), Ed Harris (Rick J. Jordan), Michael Simon
