= Son ar chistr =

Breton song

"Son ar chistr" (lit. 'Song of cider', also called "Ev chistr ’ta Laou!", lit. 'Drink cider, Laou!') is a Breton song written in 1929 by two Morbihan teenagers, Jean Bernard and Jean-Marie Prima. It was made famous through a 1970 recording by Breton singer and harpist Alan Stivell, and later, in 1976, by the Dutch band Bots under the name "Zeven dagen lang".

== History ==
=== Bots and Oktoberklub ===
In June 1976, a Dutch interpretation of Son ar chistr was released by the Dutch band Bots under the title Zeven Dagen Lang, seeing widescale popularity in the Netherlands and both West and East Germany, reaching number 23 in charts in the Netherlands. The song was first released on the album Voor God En Vaderland, a title chosen to mock the pro-NATO rhetoric in the Netherlands at the time during the NATO Double-Track Decision crisis. The Bots version of the song was not a direct translation, but included a political message in line with the outspoken leftist "battle culture" direction of the band.

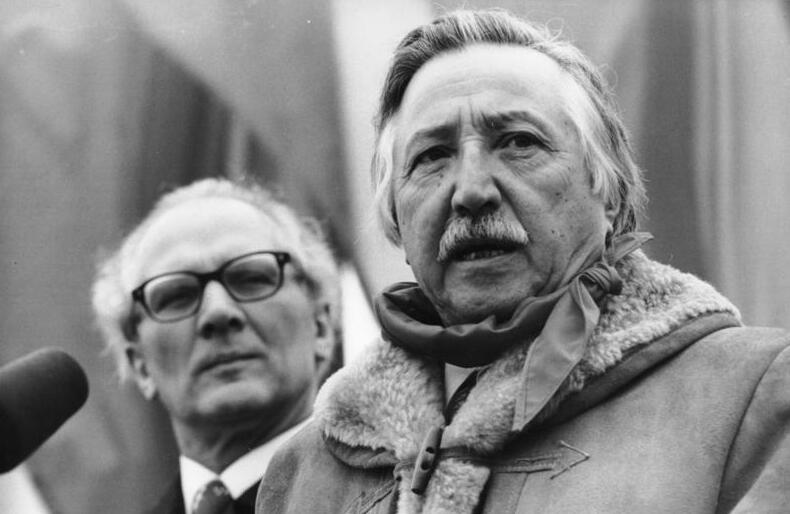
Luis Corvalán pictured with East German leader Erich Honecker in 1977.

Following this success, Bots attended the Festival of Political Songs in East Germany for several years - a festival organised by the FDJ and East German band Oktoberklub. A year later, Oktoberklub would release their own variant of the song initially under the title So wollen wir kämpfen (Note: "So we intend to fight"), this time calling for revolutionary solidarity and in support of the exiled Chilean communist leader Luis Corvalan. Through the Singebewegung, an institutionalised music movement organised by the East German government to steer cultural engagement towards socialist idealism, the song was framed to promote the ideals of egalitarian camaraderie, collective labour and anti-imperialist solidarity. In 1983 Neues Deutschland, the official party newspaper of the Socialist Unity Party, described the song as one of the most popular songs of the FDJ-Singebewegung.

After Bots performed at the festival Rock Gegen Rechts in 1979, the band released a version in German a year later, assisted in translation by writers including Wolf Biermann, Hanns Dieter Hüsch, Hannes Wader, Diether Dehm (Note: Under his pseudonym Lerryn, a portmanteau of his nickname, Larry, and Lenin) and Günter Wallraff. The festival took place at the Rebstockgelände, a former airport near Frankfurt-am-Main, and was organised by the Communist League. Through the political orientation of both Bots and Oktoberklub, the song was used in numerous demonstrations during the European Peace Marches of the 1980s. With the popularity of both releases from the two music groups, both with significant influences in the folk music scene, the song became a staple of folk groups around the world and has been translated into many languages.

Microphone Mafia

In 2005, a new version of "Wat zullen we drinken" was recorded by Bots in collaboration with Moroccan-Dutch rapper Ali B on the occasion of the Muziek10Daagse, highlighting themes of inter-ethnic relations, integration and multiculturalism. In 2014, Bots released an updated collection as a tribute to their late frontman, Hans Sanders. The album also featured the title track, "Was sollen wir denken" ("What are we supposed to think"), a collaboration with the German rap group Microphone Mafia. The song was transformed into a modern critique of neoliberal austerity, the systemic challenges faced by gastarbeiter and immigrant communities, and the distorting influence of corporate media.

In Germany, the VVN-BdA has noted the attempted reinterpretation of progressive songs by far-right musicians associated with the NPD such as Frank Rennicke, making specific mention of "Was wollen wir trinken". Furthermore, on the Runet, the German version of the song is often mistakenly believed to be associated with the Luftwaffe, due to a popular YouTube video pairing the Bots version of the song with an image of a Tiger tank.

=== Ray Fisher and Martin Carthy ===
The melody of Son ar chistr was adapted to the traditional folk ballad of Willie's Lady by Ray Fisher in Scots and Martin Carthy in English. Both Fisher and Carthy collaborated in their respective versions while Carthy was visiting the Rosses (Ray and her husband Colin Ross) at their home in Monkseaton. The three were heavily involved in the British folk revival scene through The High Level Ranters, as well as close relations with Tim Hart and Peter Knight of Steeleye Span. Carthy released his version first on his 1976 album Crown of Horn. As a result of Fisher's aversion to recording studios, her version did not release on vinyl until the release of the title track of her 1982 album Willie's Lady.

== Recordings ==
The song is still used by folk groups around the world and has been translated into many languages. Though many groups keep the popular motif, the lyrics sometimes differ completely from the original. Selected recordings include:

- Elen Guychard - Tudjentil Baod (1940)
- Kevrenn Saint-Malo & Jacques Malard - Ev Chistr Ta Laou! Skaer (1959)
- Alan Stivell — Son Ar Chistr (1970)
- Bots — Zeven dagen lang (1976)
- Frida Boccara — La Mariée (1976)
- Oktoberklub — Was wollen wir trinken (1977)
- Bots — Sieben Tage lang (1980)
- Angelo Branduardi — Gulliver (1980)
- The Chieftains — Ev Chistr 'Ta, Laou! (1987)
- De Höhner — Was wollen wir trinken sieben Tage lang (1995)
- The Pitcher - Drink (1997)
- Rapalje — Wat zullen we drinken (1998)
- Scooter — How Much Is the Fish? (1998), (2006)
- Alexander Pushnoy — Почём Камбала? (1999)
- Onkel Tom Angelripper — Medley Aus 6 Liedern (1999)
- Mervent — Ev Sistr (2001)
- Luar Na Lubre — Espiral (2002)
- Blackmore’s Night — All For One (2003)
- Adorned Brood — 7 Tage Lang (2006)
- Ray Fisher, Martin Carthy - Willie's Lady (2006)
- Mickie Krause — Jan Pillemann Otze (2008)
- K.I.Z — Was kostet der Fisch (2009)
- Leshak — Was wollen wir trinken (2009)
- Meldis — Son ar Sistr (2010)
- Teekkarikuoro — Sahtilaulu (2010)
- Tikkey A. Shelyen — Во славу сидра (2011)
- Tom Angelripper (Sodom) — Was wollen wir trinken (2011)
- Discharger — The Price Of Justice (2012)
- Basslovers United — Drunken (2012)
- Tony Junior — Twerk Anthem (2013)
- Anaïs Mitchell, Jefferson Hamer — Willie's Lady (Child 6) (2013)
- Eluveitie — Lvgvs (2017)
- dArtagnan — Was wollen wir trinken (2017)
- Tri Yann ft Gwennyn - Son ar chistr (2017)
- Dimitri Vegas & Like Mike — The Chase (2020)
- dArtagnan — We're gonna be drinking (2022)

=== Bibliography ===
- (in French) A. Stivell et J-N Verdier, Telenn, la Harpe Bretonne, 2004, p. 123
- (in French) Frédéric Prima, «Son ar chistr. Une chanson qui fait le tour du monde», dans Musique bretonne no 173, juillet 2002, p. 36-37
- (in French) Jean-Marie Prima, «Aux origines d'une chanson... Son ar chistr», dans Musique bretonne no 136, juillet 1995, p. 22-24
