= I Was Made for Lovin' You =

1979 song by Kiss

- UK picture sleeve

Single by Kiss

from the album Dynasty
- B-side: "Hard Times"; "Charisma"
- Released: May 1979
- Recorded: 1979
- Studio: Electric Lady, Record Plant (New York City)
- Genre: Hard rock; disco
- Length: 4:30 (album); 4:01 (7-inch/video); 7:54 (12-inch); 4:18 (Killers version)
- Label: Casablanca
- Songwriters: Paul Stanley; Vini Poncia; Desmond Child
- Producer: Vini Poncia

Kiss singles chronology
"You Still Matter to Me" (1978)	"I Was Made for Lovin' You" (1979)	"Sure Know Something" (1979)

Music video
- "I Was Made for Lovin' You" on YouTube

Alternative cover
- French picture sleeve

"I Was Made for Lovin' You" is a song by the American rock band Kiss from their seventh studio album, Dynasty (1979). Released as a single in 1979, the song became a hit on the Billboard Hot 100 chart, was certified gold in the US on August 16, 1979, and went platinum in several countries. The song has remained a concert staple and is featured on many live albums and compilations.

== History ==
The song became a permanent staple in Kiss's live performances. The band's performance of the song at their 30th anniversary show in Melbourne, Australia, was accompanied by the Melbourne Symphony Orchestra, who wore Kiss-style makeup with their tuxedos. At first Desmond Child said, "Paul wanted to write a good disco song and I decided to help him with that. Paul started to write lyrics and chords then I played the song on the guitar and said 'OK, we'll do something to improve this and make it really a good song.'"

"I Was Made for Lovin' You" draws heavily from the disco style that was popular in late-1970s United States. According to legend, the members of the band were in conflict with their producers, who wanted the band to shift to a more commercial sound. In response, the band argued that lucrative disco songs could be written by anyone in a short time frame. The story goes that the song's demo was completed in mere hours after the bet. While the story is unproven, Paul Stanley, who co-wrote the song with Desmond Child and Vini Poncia, has stated that it was a conscious effort on his part to prove how easy it was to write and record a hit disco song. Child confirms that he and Stanley wrote the verses together in an hour at SIR Studios, while the "Motown-influenced" chorus was penned by Stanley and Poncia after Child had left the studio. Gene Simmons revealed in a 2018 interview that he always disliked the song because of his vocal part.

Although Peter Criss appears in the video and on the album cover, he did not actually play on the track. As with most of the Dynasty album, session drummer Anton Fig took his place, as Poncia had deemed Criss unfit to play. There is a bootleg audio recording of the writing sessions for the song in which Stanley mentions Criss's name a couple of times, indicating he was present during the arranging of the song. Stanley plays the rhythm guitar while Ace Frehley provided the guitar solo. The rumours that Gene Simmons did not play bass on the recording are incorrect; it is now confirmed by Vini Poncia and others that it is Simmons on the recording. "The Return of Kiss" was how Dynasty was billed in commercials and advertisements for the album.

== Release ==
"I Was Made for Lovin' You" was Kiss's first songwriting collaboration with Desmond Child, who also wrote songs for the albums Animalize, Asylum, Crazy Nights, Smashes, Thrashes & Hits, and Hot in the Shade. While not as drastic as the 1979 "Radio Single Mix", the length of the song is edited by some eleven seconds down to 4 minutes and 16 seconds. Like the 1979 edit, the beginning measures of the song are reduced from four to two and the harmonizing following the guitar solo is halved.

The music video of "I Was Made for Lovin' You" was filmed on June 20, 1979, in the Savannah Civic Center in Savannah, Georgia, and was directed by John Goodhue. After the show was canceled, it was decided to use the already completed stage to film two videos. A promotional video was shot featuring the song performed on the Dynasty stage set, consisting simply of the band performing the song. It was not included in the "Kissology" DVD series.

The B-side of the single is the album track "Hard Times", which was written by Ace Frehley, while the B side of the 12" single was Gene Simmons' "Charisma"

== Reception ==
"I Was Made for Lovin' You" was the band's second gold single, selling over 1 million copies. The single was certified gold in the U.S. on August 16, 1979, and in Canada on August 1, 1979. The song was one of the band's few singles to chart in the UK in the 1970s, peaking at No. 50.

The single reached No. 11 on the U.S. Billboard Hot 100 chart and No. 1 in the Canadian RPM national singles chart (the band's second chart-topping single in that country, following "Shout It Out Loud"). In Australia, the single spent 11 weeks in the top 5 and 16 weeks in the top 10, peaking at No. 2 on the Kent Music Report. In New Zealand, the single went to number 1, topping the RIANZ Singles Chart. It also charted in Western Europe; it became a top-20 hit in Sweden, a top-10 hit in Norway, and a number-two hit in Switzerland and West Germany. In France and the Netherlands, it reached No. 1. In the UK, it stalled at number 50.

Billboard described "I Was Made for Lovin' You" as a "catchy song" which is more melodic than previous Kiss efforts and that incorporates some disco influence and "heavy guitars."

Some Kiss fans dismissed it as a sell-out, with Rolling Stone magazine's David Fricke writing, "The Kiss army is going to mutiny when they hear 'I Was Made for Lovin’ You,' the disco-infected leadoff track on the Masked Marvels’ latest album. They'll demand to know why their heroes, after years of rallying the troops into battle against disco and other threatening schlock, have turned tail and joined forces with uptown popsters like producer Vini Poncia (whose soft-rock credentials include LPs by Ringo Starr and Melissa Manchester) and singer/tunesmith Desmond Child (who cowrote the offending song with Kiss’ Paul Stanley)." Lance Tawzer, curator of a museum exhibit chronicling the infamous Disco Demolition Night riot of 1979, suggested this song may have helped inspire that event, telling the Chicago Tribune, "That's Kiss' disco song, 'I Was Made for Lovin' You... That's the moment when they jumped that shark."

Despite the backlash, the song has become a concert staple over the years, with a different arrangement that de-emphasizes the song's disco elements. Gene Simmons has stated that "I Was Made for Lovin' You" is his least favorite Kiss song, and Ace Frehley and Peter Criss have also indicated that they dislike the song.

== Personnel ==
- Paul Stanley – lead and backing vocals, rhythm guitar
- Gene Simmons – bass, backing vocals
- Ace Frehley – lead guitar, backing vocals
- Anton Fig – drums
- Vini Poncia – synthesizer, backing vocals

== Charts ==
=== Weekly charts ===
Chart (1979)	Peak position
Australian Singles (Kent Music Report)	2
Austria (Ö3 Austria Top 40)	6
Belgium (Ultratop 50 Flanders)	1
Canada Top Singles (RPM)	1
Canada Dance/Urban (RPM)	1
Italy (Musica e dischi)	10
Netherlands (Dutch Top 40)	1
Netherlands (Single Top 100)	1
New Zealand (Recorded Music NZ)	1
Norway (VG-lista)	10
Portugal (Música & Som)	1
South Africa (Springbok Radio)	2
Sweden (Sverigetopplistan)	19
Switzerland (Schweizer Hitparade)	2
UK Singles (Official Charts)	50
US Billboard Hot 100	11
US Billboard Hot Dance Club Play	37
US Cash Box Top 100	8
West Germany (GfK)	2

=== Year-end charts ===
Chart (1979)	Position
Australia (Kent Music Report)	2
Canada Top Singles (RPM)	8
Netherlands (Dutch Top 40)	1
New Zealand (RIANZ)	6
South Africa (Springbok Radio)	18
Switzerland (Schweizer Hitparade)	16
U.S. Billboard Hot 100	74
U.S. Cash Box Top 100	74
West Germany (Media Control)	12

== Certifications ==
Region	Certification	Certified units/sales
Australia (ARIA)	Platinum	100,000^{^}
Brazil (Pro-Música Brasil)	Gold	30,000^{‡}
Canada (Music Canada)	Gold	75,000^{^}
Denmark (IFPI Danmark)	Platinum	90,000^{‡}
Germany (BVMI)	Platinum	600,000^{‡}
Italy (FIMI)	Platinum	50,000^{‡}
Japan (RIAJ) Digital single	Gold	100,000^{*}
Netherlands (NVPI)	Gold	50,000^{^}
New Zealand (RMNZ)	3× Platinum	90,000^{‡}
Spain (Promusicae)	Platinum	60,000^{‡}
United Kingdom (BPI)	Platinum	600,000^{‡}
United States (RIAA)	Gold	1,000,000^{^}
^{*} Sales figures based on certification alone.^{^} Shipments figures based on certification alone.^{‡} Sales+streaming figures based on certification alone.

== Scooter version ==
"I Was Made for Lovin' You"

Single by Scooter

from the album No Time to Chill
- A-side: "We Are the Greatest"
- Released: September 21, 1998
- Recorded: Loop D.C. Studio 1 (Hamburg, Germany)
- Length: 3:28
- Label: Club Tools
- Songwriters: Paul Stanley; Desmond Child; Vini Poncia

Scooter singles chronology
"How Much Is the Fish?" (1998)	"I Was Made for Lovin' You" / "We Are the Greatest" (1998)	"Call Me Mañana" (1999)

A cover version of the song by German musical group Scooter was released as a double A-side with "We Are the Greatest" on September 21, 1998.

=== Track listing ===
- CD single
1. "We Are the Greatest" (3:27)
2. "I Was Made for Lovin' You" (3:32)
3. "We Are the Greatest" (Extended) (4:35)
4. "Greatest Beats" (3:05)
- 12-inch maxi-single
1. "We Are the Greatest" (Extended) (4:35)
2. "We Are the Greatest" (3:27)
3. "I Was Made for Lovin' You" (3:32)

=== Charts ===
Chart (1998–1999)	Peak position
Austria (Ö3 Austria Top 40) Double A-side with "We Are the Greatest"	36
Belgium (Ultratop 50 Flanders) Double A-side with "We Are the Greatest"	50
Netherlands (Single Top 100) Double A-side with "We Are the Greatest"	98
Germany (GfK) Double A-side with "We Are the Greatest"	26
Sweden (Sverigetopplistan) Double A-side with "We Are the Greatest"	45

== Other notable versions ==
=== Menudo ===
Puerto Rican boy band Menudo sang the song in a Spanish translation as "Fui Hecho Para Amarte" for their 1981 Xanadu album. The interpretation also appeared on their first film, Menudo: La Pelicula, also released in 1981.

=== Paulina Rubio ===
Mexican pop singer Paulina Rubio recorded the song with producer Brian Rawling for her sixth studio album, Border Girl, in 2002 at Soundtrack Studios in New York.

Rubio's version received positive reviews from critics. While reviewing Border Girl, Jose F. Promis of AllMusic selected the song as a highlight, calling it "almost unbelievably" as emblematic as the original version. MTV Asia declared, "Gene Simmons and company would have died to have a groupie like her," while Rolling Stone said Rubio's version "replaces the song's rollercoaster vocal howls with Rubio's sensuous purr and a dumbed-down dance beat."

Rubio's first performed the song on the 2002 MTV Video Music Awards Latinoamérica. As well, performed the song on her Amor, Luz y Sonido Tour in 2007.

=== Oliver Heldens, VINAI and Le Pedre ===
Dutch DJ Oliver Heldens reworked the song with vocals provided by Nile Rodgers and British vocal group House Gospel Choir (HGC).

=== Ricki-Lee Coulter ===
Australian singer Ricki-Lee Coulter released a version produced by DNA on March 1, 2024 as the fourth single from her fifth studio album, On My Own.

=== Yungblud ===
British singer-songwriter Yungblud covered the song for the 2024 film The Fall Guy in April of the same year.

=== "Shreds" parody ===
In 2007, the Finnish multimedia artist Santeri Ojala uploaded a parody video based on a live concert performance by Kiss. Ojala replaced the original sound with badly played music and nonsense singing. The video was part of Ojala's series of "Shreds" parodies which went viral.
