= The Ultimate Aural Orgasm =

Studio album by Scooter
- Released: 9 February 2007
- Recorded: 2006
- Studio: Sheffield Underground Studios
- Genre: Trance
- Length: 50:09
- Label: Sheffield Tunes
- Producer: H.P. Baxxter; Rick J. Jordan; Michael Simon; Jens Thele

Scooter chronology
| Excess All Areas (2006) | The Ultimate Aural Orgasm (2007) | Jumping All Over the World (2007) |

Singles from The Ultimate Aural Orgasm
- 1. "Behind the Cow" Released: 19 January 2007; 2. "Lass uns tanzen" Released: 26 March 2007

Professional ratings
Review scores
| Source | Rating |
|---|---|
| Random.Access | 7.0/10 |

The Ultimate Aural Orgasm is the twelfth studio album by Scooter. Two singles were released from it: "Behind the Cow" and "Lass uns tanzen". This is the first album released with new member Michael Simon. Its artwork is an homage to the 1987 album Music for the Masses by Depeche Mode.

== Track listing ==
1. "Horny in Jericho" – 2:50
2. "Behind the Cow" (featuring Fatman Scoop) – 3:36
3. "Does the Fish Have Chips?" – 3:25
4. "The United Vibe" – 3:48
5. "Lass uns tanzen" – 4:27
6. "U.F.O. Phenomena" – 5:04
7. "Ratty's Revenge" – 4:49
8. "The Shit That Killed Elvis" (featuring Jimmy Pop and Bam Margera) – 3:55
9. "Imaginary Battle" – 3:57
10. "Scarborough Affair" – 4:26
11. "East Sands Anthem" – 4:13
12. "Love is an Ocean" – 5:45
13. "Firth of Clyde" – 4:57 (iTunes bonus track)

Notes

- "Behind the Cow" samples different versions of "What Time Is Love?" by the KLF.
- "Imaginary Battle" samples "Church of the KLF" from the KLF's 1991 album The White Room.

=== 20 Years of Hardcore bonus content ===
1. "Behind the Cow" (Spencer & Hill Bigroom Mix)
2. "Behind the Cow" (Spencer & Hill Dub Radio Edit)
3. "Taj Mahal"
4. "Lass uns Tanzen" (Radio Edit)
5. "Lass uns Tanzen" (Alternative Club Mix)
6. "Lass uns Tanzen" (DJ Zany Remix)
7. "Lass uns Tanzen" (Hardwell & Greatski Late At Night Remix)
8. "Lass uns Tanzen" (Tom Novy's New HP Invent Mix)
9. "Te Quiero"

=== Deluxe edition ===
The deluxe edition of the album comes with a second CD with the following track listing. This version was released as standard in Australia as the 2 x CD Tour Edition.

1. "Aiii Shot the DJ" (Missing Live Track)
2. "Am Fenster" (Missing Live Track)
3. "Trance Atlantic" (Special Live Version)
4. "Fire" (Full Length Live Version)
5. "Apache" (Flip & Fill UK Mix)
6. "Behind the Cow" (3 AM Mix)
- "Behind the Cow" Making of Video
- "Behind the Cow" Video
- Photos
- Band interview
- 2-sided poster

== Charts ==
Chart performance for The Ultimate Aural Orgasm
| Chart (2007) | Peak position |
|---|---|
| Austrian Albums (Ö3 Austria) | 17 |
| Czech Albums (ČNS IFPI) | 28 |
| Danish Albums (Hitlisten) | 23 |
| Finnish Albums (Suomen virallinen lista) | 25 |
| German Albums (Offizielle Top 100) | 6 |
| Hungarian Albums (MAHASZ) | 28 |
| Polish Albums (ZPAV) | 35 |
| Swedish Albums (Sverigetopplistan) | 30 |
| Swiss Albums (Schweizer Hitparade) | 66 |
