= Willie's Lady =

Traditional song

"Willie's Lady" (Roud 220, Child 6), in some versions "Simon's Lady", is an English-language folk song. The earliest known copy of the ballad is from a recitation transcribed in 1783.

A variant of this ballad was one of 25 traditional works included in Ballads Weird and Wonderful (1912) and illustrated by Vernon Hill.

== Synopsis ==
Willie has married against his mother's will. She, being a rank witch, has bewitched his wife so that she can not be delivered of her child. He attempts to bribe her with gold, and she tells him his wife will die and he will marry elsewhere. The household sprite Billy Blind tells him to make up a wax dummy of a baby and invite his mother to the christening. The mother came to see and, on seeing the wax figure, burst into a rage, demanding to know who had undone each charm she had put. Willie hurried and undoes them himself, and his wife gives birth.

== Commentary ==
This ballad is found in several Scandinavian variants (TSB A 40), with various charms laid by the witch; sometimes she could not enchant one location in the house, and when the woman in labour is moved there, the baby is born. The woman may be kept in labour for years by the magic; frequently, she dies, and her sons are born eight years old and swearing to avenge her.

In Greek mythology, the birth of Heracles was similarly delayed, by the goddess of childbirth keeping her hands folded. Galanthis, Alcmene's servant, told the goddess that Alcmene had given birth, and surprised her into unfolding her hands. This form of startling the mother-in-law into allowing the baby's birth is found in Italian fairy tales; usually it is done by announcing the birth, but in The King of Love, the baby's father feigns death, and his sisters mourn him, to the same effect.

== Recordings ==
Following are some of the notable recordings of the ballad, including the artists, titles, albums, and years:

| Artist | Title | Album | Year |
|---|---|---|---|
| Martin Carthy | "Willie's Lady" | Crown of Horn | 1976 |
| Ray Fisher | "Willie's Lady" | Willie's Lady | 1982 |
| Sharon Knight | "King Willie" | Song of the Sea | 2005 |
| Rubus | "Willie's Lady" | Nine Witch Knots | 2008 |
| Lady Maisery | "Willie's Lady" | Weave and Spin | 2011 |
| Anaïs Mitchell & Jefferson Hamer | "Willie's Lady (Child 6)" | Child Ballads | 2013 |
| Goblin Band | "Willie's Lady" | A Loaf of Wax | 2025 |

The melody used in most of these versions is that of Son ar chistr, a Breton song composed in 1929. Oli Steadman included it on his song collection "365 Days Of Folk", an alternative melody as learned from Anna Tam.

== See also ==
- List of Child Ballads
