= How Much Is the Fish? =

Single by Scooter

from the album No Time to Chill
- B-side: "Sputnik"
- Released: 8 June 1998
- Studio: Loop D.C. Studio 1 (Hamburg, Germany)
- Genre: Eurodance
- Length: 3:45
- Label: Club Tools
- Songwriters: H. P. Baxxter; Rick J. Jordan; Axel Coon; Jens Thele

Scooter singles chronology
"No Fate" (1997)	"How Much Is the Fish?" (1998)	"We Are the Greatest" / "I Was Made for Lovin' You" (1998)

Music video
- "How Much Is the Fish?" on YouTube

"How Much is the Fish?" is a hardcore/Euro-dance song by the German group Scooter. It was released in June 1998 as the lead single from their fifth studio album No Time to Chill. It is the first song to feature Axel Coon. It was made for the France '98 FIFA World Cup.

== Background ==
In May 2016, in response to increased popularity from a mention on The Tonight Show Starring Jimmy Fallon, H.P Baxxter answered the question about "How much is the fish?" on the Scooter Facebook page, revealing that "the fish" was actually the one they bought for their studio aquarium, and it cost 3.80 DM (1.94 €).

== Samples ==
"How Much is the Fish?" interpolates the song "Zeven Dagen Lang" (Seven days long) by the Dutch band Bots. The melody originates from the traditional Breton song Son ar Chistr played on Alan Stivell's 1970 album Reflets. The title is derived from lyrics in the song "Buffalo" by Anglo-Irish indie group Stump, taken from the 1986 mini-album Quirk Out. The background music sample comes from the album version of the song "Paradoxx" from the German band 666.

== Track listings ==
CD single

1. "How Much is the Fish?" – 3:45
2. "How Much is the Fish?" (Extendedfish) – 5:23
3. "How Much is the Fish?" (Clubfish) – 6:11
4. "Sputnik" – 3:06

12-inch single

1. "How Much is the Fish?" (Clubfish) – 6:11
2. "How Much is the Fish?" (Extendedfish) – 5:23

== Charts ==
=== Weekly charts ===
Weekly chart performance for "How Much Is the Fish?"
Chart (1998)	Peak position
Austria (Ö3 Austria Top 40)	9
Belgium (Ultratop 50 Flanders)	1
Denmark (Tracklisten)	12
Netherlands (Dutch Top 40)	21
Netherlands (Single Top 100)	21
Finland (Suomen virallinen lista)	2
Germany (GfK)	3
Norway (VG-lista)	19
Sweden (Sverigetopplistan)	23
Switzerland (Schweizer Hitparade)	13

=== Year-end charts ===
Year-end chart performance for "How Much Is the Fish?"
Chart (1998)	Position
Belgium (Ultratop 50 Flanders)	11
Germany (Media Control)	22

== Certifications ==
Certifications for "How Much Is the Fish?"
Region	Certification	Certified units/sales
Germany (BVMI)	Gold	250,000^{^}
^{^} Shipments figures based on certification alone.

== Covers ==
- In collaboration with Scooter, the German hip-hop band K.I.Z wrote a song in German language called Was kostet der Fisch?. While the title is a direct translation, the songtext is a reinterpretation and should not be considered a cover of the original song. It was released on the album Jumping All Over the World in 2008.
- Lento violento artist DJ Maxwell covered the song, in 2015 for their 3rd album Trust No One Part III.
- In 2017, Russian pianist Olga Scheps released a single adaption, and a classic version of the song for the 2019 album 100% Scooter – Piano Only.
