= I'm Lonely (Scooter song) =

Single by Scooter

from the album Jumping All Over the World
- B-side: "Way Up North"
- Released: 18 April 2008
- Recorded: 2007
- Genre: Jumpstyle; hard trance
- Length: 3:30
- Label: Sheffield Tunes
- Songwriters: Jef Martens; H. P. Baxxter; Rick J. Jordan; Michael Simon; Jens Thele
- Producers: Rick J. Jordan; Michael Simon

Scooter singles chronology
"Jumping All Over the World" (2008)	"I'm Lonely" (2008)	"Jump That Rock (Whatever You Want)" (2008)

"I'm Lonely" is the fourth single from Scooter 2007 album, Jumping All Over the World.

The song was originally going to be released as the full third single in the UK as the follow-up to "Jumping All Over the World". The song's video received heavy play on Clubland TV and was popular on YouTube. However, the single only received a download-only release on 29 September 2008, to make way for the collaboration with Status Quo, "Jump That Rock (Whatever You Want)".

== Track listings ==
CD maxi

1. "I'm Lonely" (Radio Edit) – 3:30
2. "I'm Lonely" ('Dressed for Success' Club Mix) – 5:00
3. "I'm Lonely" (Extended) – 5:53
4. "Way Up North" – 4:07
5. "I'm Lonely" (The Video) – 3:31
6. "I'm Lonely" (Making of) – 3:17

CD single

1. "I'm Lonely" (Radio Edit) – 3:30
2. "I'm Lonely" (Extended) – 5:53

12"

1. "I'm Lonely" (Extended) – 5:53
2. "I'm Lonely" ('Dressed for Success' Club Mix) – 5:00

Download

1. "I'm Lonely" (Radio Edit) – 3:30
2. "I'm Lonely" ('Dressed for Success' Club Mix) – 5:00
3. "I'm Lonely" (Extended) – 5:53
4. "Way Up North" – 4:07

UK promo CD maxi

1. "I'm Lonely" (Radio Edit) – 3:32
2. "I'm Lonely" (Extended Mix) – 5:54
3. "I'm Lonely" (Styles & Breeze Remix) – 6:16
4. "I'm Lonely" (Flip & Fill Remix) – 6:11
5. "I'm Lonely" (Alex K Remix) – 7:35
6. "I'm Lonely" ('Dressed for Success' Club Mix) – 5:00

UK download

1. "I'm Lonely" (Radio Edit) – 3:30
2. "I'm Lonely" (Extended) – 5:52
3. "I'm Lonely" ('Dressed for Success' Club Mix) – 4:59
4. "Way Up North" – 4:05

== Charts ==
Chart performance for "I'm Lonely"
Chart (2008)	Peak position
Austria (Ö3 Austria Top 40)	20
European Hot 100 Singles (Billboard)	33
Germany (GfK)	8

== Samples ==
- "I'm Lonely" samples the songs "Lonely" by Felix Project (official sample) and "Fly Away" by Vincent de Moor (unofficial sample).
