= We Are the Greatest =

Single by Scooter

from the album No Time to Chill
- B-side: "Greatest Beats"
- Released: 21 September 1998
- Recorded: 1998
- Studio: Loop D.C. Studio 1, Hamburg
- Length: 3:28
- Label: Club Tools
- Songwriters: H. P. Baxxter; Rick J. Jordan; Axel Coon; Jens Thele; Paul Stanley; Desmond Child; Vini Poncia

Scooter singles chronology
"How Much Is the Fish?" (1998)	"We Are the Greatest" / "I Was Made for Lovin' You" (1998)	"Call Me Mañana" (1999)

Music video
- "We are the greatest" on YouTube

Music video
- "I Was Made for Lovin' You" on YouTube

"We Are the Greatest" is a song by German group Scooter. It was released as a double A-side with their cover of "I Was Made for Lovin' You" on 21 September 1998. Both original versions of the songs are taken from the group's fifth studio album No Time to Chill. However, "We Are The Greatest" is remixed and has new vocals from HP compared to the album version.

== Track listing ==
CD single

1. "We Are the Greatest" – 3:27
2. "I Was Made for Lovin' You" – 3:32
3. "We Are the Greatest" (Extended) – 4:35
4. "Greatest Beats" – 3:05

12-inch single

1. "We Are the Greatest" (Extended) – 4:35
2. "We Are the Greatest" – 3:27
3. "I Was Made for Lovin' You" – 3:32

== Samples ==
"We are the Greatest" samples the 1983 single "Street Dance" by rap act Break Machine and the lyrics of the 1985 song "Don't Stop the Rock" by Freestyle.

== Music video ==
The accompanying music video for Scooter's version of "I Was Made for Lovin' You" takes place chronologically after the video for "We are the Greatest".

== Chart performance ==
Chart performance for "We Are the Greatest"
Chart (1998–1999)	Peak position
Austria (Ö3 Austria Top 40)	36
Belgium (Ultratop 50 Flanders)	50
Netherlands (Single Top 100)	98
Germany (GfK)	26
Sweden (Sverigetopplistan)	45
