= Diether Dehm =

German politician

Diether Dehm MdB a.D.
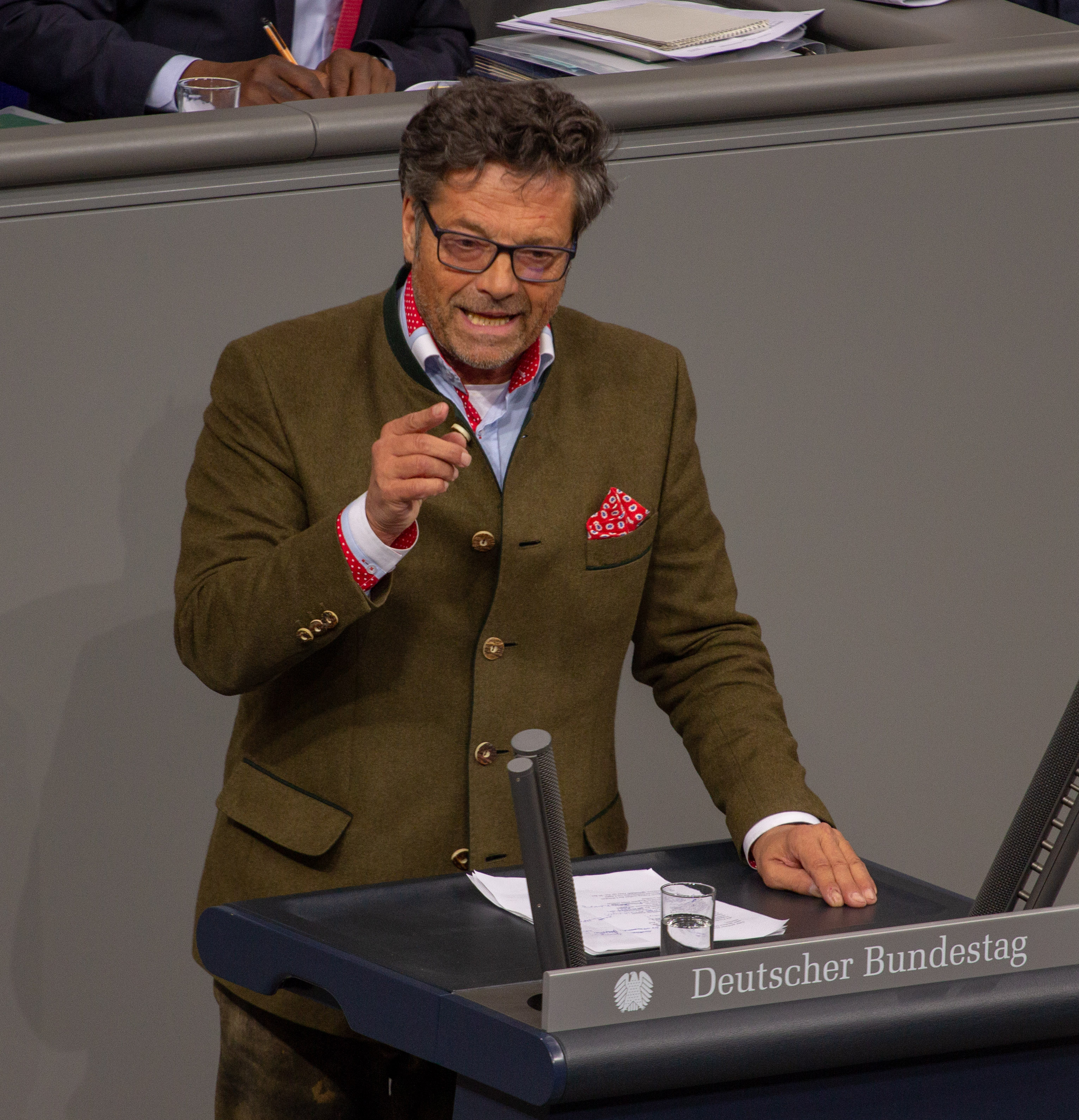
- Dehm in 2019

Member of the Bundestag for Lower Saxony (Hesse; 1994)
- In office 17 October 2005 – 26 October 2021
- Preceded by: multi-member district
- Succeeded by: Victor Perli
- In office 16 August 1994 – 10 November 1994
- Preceded by: Barbara Weiler
- Succeeded by: multi-member district

Personal details
- Born: Jörg-Diether Dehm-Desoi; 3 April 1950 (age 76) Frankfurt am Main, West Germany (now Germany)
- Party: The Left (2007–)
- Other political affiliations: Party of Democratic Socialism (1998–2007); Social Democratic Party (1966–1998)
- Education: Goethe University Frankfurt
- Occupation: Politician; Record producer; singer-songwriter; Businessman; Author
- Website: Official website

Diether Dehm (full name Jörg-Diether Dehm-Desoi; born 3 April 1950) is a German left-wing politician, musician and music manager. He was a member of the Social Democratic Party of Germany, the PDS, and the Left Party.

== Early life and education ==
Dehm was born in Frankfurt on 3 April 1950. His father Otto Dehm was a mechanic, and played football for FSV Frankfurt, and his mother Inge (née Schulz) was a clerk. He studied remedial education, graduating in 1972, and receiving a doctorate in 1975.

== Career as songwriter and music producer ==
Dehm performed as a singer-songwriter in the 1960s under the pseudonym Lerryn, a portmanteau of his nickname, Larry, and Lenin. He won an award at the Internationale Essener Songtage, a seminal arts festival held in 1968. In 1971, he founded Lieder im Park ('Songs in the Park'), a summer festival showcasing singer-songwriters, and organised Rock gegen rechts ('Rock Against the Right Wing') events.

Dehm produced, wrote and played on Dutch folk rock band Bots's album Aufstehn ('Stand Up'). Included on the album is "Sieben Tage lang", the German version of Bots's best-known song, "Zeven Dagen Lang" ('Seven Days Long'); the translation was done by Dehm and Günter Wallraff. Dehm, using the pseudonym N. Heirell, collaborated with Klaus Lage to write the song 1000 und 1 Nacht (Zoom!) ('1000 and 1 Night'), which reached number five on the German singles charts in September 1984.

In 1988, Dehm wrote a new party anthem for the SPD, titled "Das weiche Wasser bricht den Stein".

In the 1990s, Dehm wrote the screenplay for the musical film Die Eisprinzessin, starring Katharina Witt; Dehm had been Witt's manager for a time.

== Stasi activities ==
In 1970–1971, Dehm was recruited by the East German Stasi secret service, and both he and his wife Christa Desoi became unofficial collaborators (IMs). Dehm used the codename Willy. His most notable work for the Stasi came in 1976, after dissident East German songwriter Wolf Biermann was exiled while in West Germany. Dehm became Biermann's manager, and reported on Biermann's activities. According to Stasi files, Dehm also reported on, among other subjects, activities of the SPD and certain West German artists, and goings-on at the University of Frankfurt. In 1996, a court ruled that it was legal to refer to Dehm as a Stasi informer.

== Political career ==
Dehm was a member of the SPD from 1966 to 1998, serving as a member of the Bundestag for a short time in 1994. He became a member of the PDS in 1998, and was elected one of its deputy chairs in 1999. He won re-election to that position twice, but lost when he ran for a fourth term in 2003.

From 2004 to 2010, Dehm was state chairman for Lower Saxony in the Left Party. He has been a Left Party member of the Bundestag since 2005. Since 2010, he has chaired the Bundesarbeitsgemeinschaft Linke Unternehmerinnen und Unternehmer, a Left Party group representing entrepreneurs, and has advocated on behalf of businesspeople.

== Controversies ==
In 2016, it was revealed that Dehm had hired former Red Army Faction terrorist Christian Klar to perform work on his website. His employment of Klar was disclosed when Dehm attempted to obtain clearance for him to work inside the Bundestag building.
