= No Time to Chill =

Studio album by Scooter
- Released: 20 July 1998
- Recorded: 1998
- Studios: Loop D.C. Studios 1 and 2 (Hamburg, Germany)
- Length: 52:03
- Labels: Club Tools; Loop Dance Constructions
- Producers: H.P. Baxxter; Rick J. Jordan; Axel Coon; Jens Thele

Scooter chronology
Rough and Tough and Dangerous – The Singles 94/98 (1998)	No Time to Chill (1998)	Back to the Heavyweight Jam (1999)

Singles from No Time to Chill
- 1. "How Much Is the Fish?" Released: 8 June 1998; 2. "We Are The Greatest" / "I Was Made For Lovin' You" Released: 21 September 1998; 3. "Call Me Mañana" Released: 8 January 1999

No Time to Chill is the fifth studio album by German band Scooter. It was released on 20 July 1998. It contains three singles, "How Much Is the Fish?", "We Are the Greatest/I Was Made for Lovin' You" and "Call Me Mañana". It is the first album featuring Axel Coon. The booklet for the album was photographed inside the Wasserturm Hamburg-Winterhude by Holger Roschlaub. Today, the building houses the Planetarium Hamburg.

The album was re-released on LP on 29 January 2022, which was available on black and green LP, with the green coloured vinyl being limited to 500 copies.

== Track listing ==
- All songs written and composed by H.P. Baxxter, Rick J. Jordan, Axel Coon, and Jens Thele; except "I Was Made for Lovin' You" written by Paul Stanley, Desmond Child, and Vini Poncia; "Eyes Without a Face" written by Billy Idol and Steve Stevens.
- All lyrics written by The Radical MC H.P.
1. "Last Warning" – 0:56
2. "How Much Is the Fish?" – 3:45
3. "We Are the Greatest" – 5:08
4. "Call Me Mañana" – 3:54
5. "Don't Stop" – 3:39
6. "I Was Made for Lovin' You" – 3:32
7. "Frequent Traveller" – 3:35
8. "Eyes Without a Face" – 3:17
9. "Hands Up!" – 4:05
10. "Everything's Borrowed" – 5:13
11. "Expecting More from Ratty" – 4:10
12. "Time and Space" – 4:49

Notes

- "How Much Is the Fish?" samples the song "Zeven Dagen Lang" by the Dutch band Bots. The melody originates from a traditional Celtic Son ar Chistr played on Alan Stivell's 1970 album Reflets. The title is derived from lyrics in the song "Buffalo" by Anglo-Irish indie group Stump, taken from the 1986 mini-album Quirk Out. The background music sample comes from the album version of the song Paradox from the German band 666.
- "We Are the Greatest" samples the 1982 single "Street Dance" by rap act Break Machine and the lyrics of the 1985 song "Don't Stop the Rock" by Freestyle.
- Single version of "Call Me Mañana" samples the song "James Brown Is Dead" by Dutch rave duo L.A. Style, as well as Scooter's own song "I'm Raving".
- "I Was Made for Lovin' You" is a cover of the Kiss song, taken from the 1979 album Dynasty.
- "Eyes Without A Face" is a cover of the Billy Idol song, taken from the 1983 album Rebel Yell.
- "Expecting More from Ratty" was the first mention of the group's future pseudonym 'Ratty', under which name they would release two singles and produce several remixes.

== Charts ==
=== Weekly charts ===
Weekly chart performance for No Time to Chill
Chart (1998)	Peak position
Austrian Albums (Ö3 Austria)	27
Finnish Albums (Suomen virallinen lista)	1
German Albums (Offizielle Top 100)	4
Hungarian Albums (MAHASZ)	1
Norwegian Albums (VG-lista)	28
Swedish Albums (Sverigetopplistan)	16
Swiss Albums (Schweizer Hitparade)	20

=== Year-end charts ===
Year-end chart performance for No Time to Chill
Chart (1998)	Position
German Albums Chart	95

== Certifications ==
Certifications for No Time to Chill
Region	Certification	Certified units/sales
Finland (Musiikkituottajat)	Gold	36,276
Poland (ZPAV)	Gold	50,000^{*}
^{*} Sales figures based on certification alone.
