= The King of Love =

Italian fairy tale from Sicily

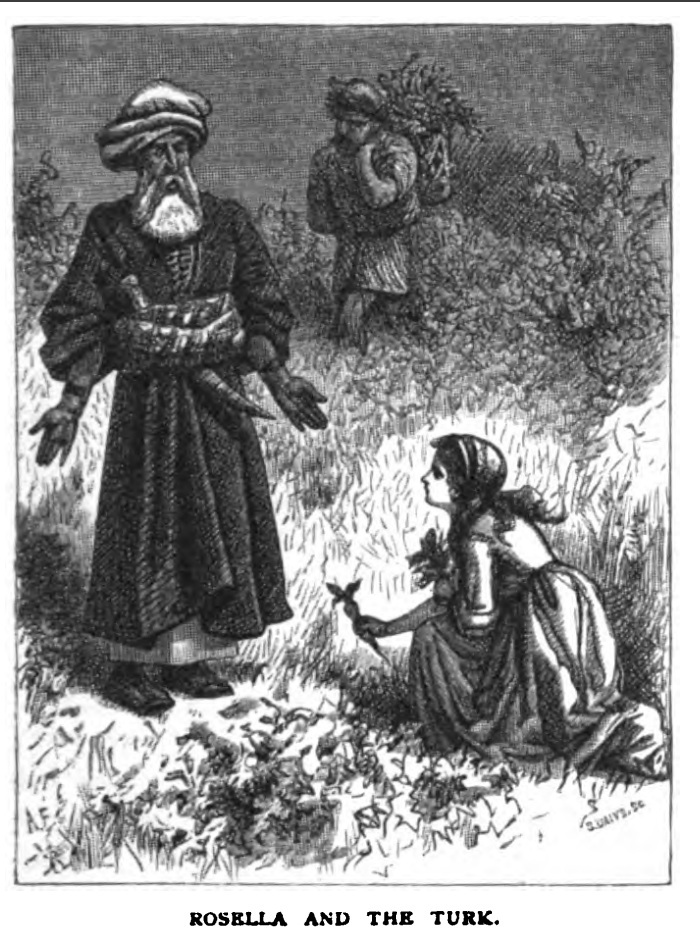
- Rosella accidentally summons the Turk servant. Artwork dated to 1878.

Folk tale
- Name: The King of Love
- Also known as: Lu Re d'Amuri
- Aarne–Thompson grouping: ATU 425B, "Son of the Witch"
- Region: Sicily
- Related: Cupid and Psyche; The Golden Root; Prunella

The King of Love (Sicilian: Lu Re d'Amuri) is an Italian fairy tale from Sicily collected by Giuseppe Pitre and translated into English by Thomas Frederick Crane in Italian Popular Tales.

It is part of the international cycle of the Animal as Bridegroom and classified as tale type Aarne-Thompson-Uther type ATU 425B, "Son of the Witch", thus distantly related to the Graeco-Roman myth of Cupid and Psyche, in that the heroine is forced to perform difficult tasks for a witch.

== Synopsis ==
A man made his living gathering wild herbs. One day he took his youngest daughter, Rosella (Rusidda), with him, and she pulled up a radish. A Turk appeared and said she must come to his master and be punished. He brought them underground, where a green bird appeared, washed in milk, and became a man. The Turk told what had happened. The father said that there was no sign that the radish had belonged to him. The man married Rosella and gave her father a sack of gold. One day, while the man was away, her sisters visited her. She told them that her husband had forbidden her to ask who he was, but they persuaded her to ask his name. He told her that he was the King of Love and vanished.

She wandered in search of him, calling for him, and an ogress appeared, demanding to know why Rosella called on her nephew. The ogress took pity on her and let her stay the night, telling her that she was one of seven sister ogresses, and the worst was her mother-in-law. Each day, Rosella met another; on the seventh day, a sister of the King of Love told Rosella to climb her hair into the house while their mother was out. Then she and her sisters told Rosella to seize their mother and pinch her until the ogress cried out to be left alone in her son's name.

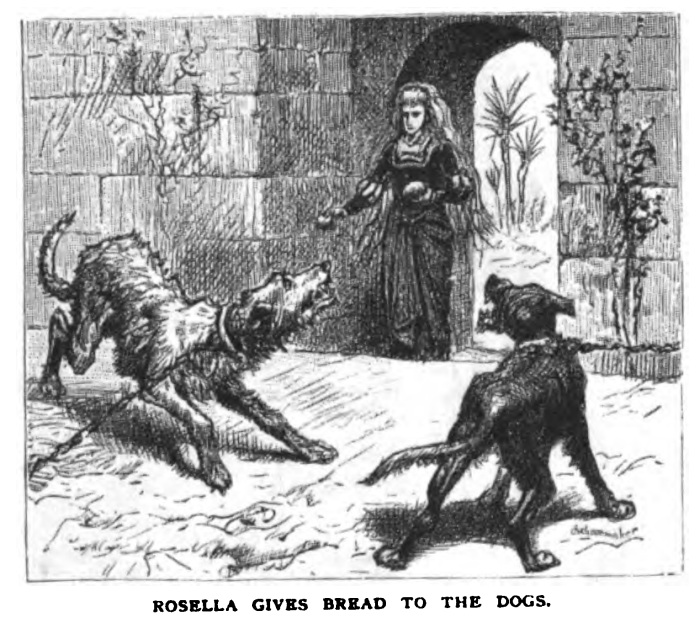
Rosella gives bread to the dogs to allow passage to the ogress's lair. Illustration from a 1878 magazine.

Rosella did this, and the ogress wanted to eat her, but the ogress's daughters stopped her. Then she insisted that Rosella carry a letter for her. In the wilderness, Rosella called on the King of Love again. He warned her to flatter things along the way: to drink from and praise two rivers, to eat and praise fruit from an orchard, to eat bread from an oven and praise it, to feed two dogs, to sweep a hall, and to polish a knife, razor and scissors. Then she was to deliver the letter, seize a box from the table, and run. When she did this, the ogress called after her for things to destroy her, but they refused because of her kindness. Curious, she opened the box; musical instruments escaped, and she had to call on her husband again to get them back.

The ogress wanted to eat Rosella again but her daughters stopped her again. She ordered her to fill a mattress with feathers from all the birds in the air. The King of Love got the King of Birds to have the birds fill the mattress. Then the ogress married her son to the daughter of the King of Portugal, and had Rosella hold the torches for the bridal chamber; but the king got his bride to switch places with Rosella, and the ground opened up and swallowed the bride.

The ogress declared that Rosella's child would not be born until she unclasped her hands. The King of Love had his body laid out as if he were dead, and his sisters lamented him. The ogress unclasped her hands, demanding to know how he had died. Rosella's son was born. This so enraged the ogress that she died.

== Analysis ==
=== Tale type ===
Folktale collector Thomas Frederick Crane described thus the format that would later be classified in the Aarne-Thompson-Uther Index as tale type ATU 425, "The Search for the Lost Husband":

The most wide-spread and interesting class of Fairy Tales is the one in which a wife endeavors to behold the face of her husband, who comes to her only at night. She succeeds, but her husband disappears, and she is not reunited to him until she has expiated her indiscretion by weary journeys and the performance of difficult tasks. This class (...) is evidently the popular form of the classic myth of Cupid and Psyche (...)

In this regard, these tales involve the heroine performing difficult tasks for her husband's family (more specifically, her mother-in-law), a type classified as ATU 425B, "The Son of the Witch" or "The Witch's Tasks".

=== Motifs ===
According to Renato Aprile, the heroine's husband's name, "Re d'Amore", is a reminiscence of Cupid from the Graeco-Roman tale.

Scholars Rudolf Schenda and Doris Senn noted that the opening motif of the cabbage stalk (or cabbage head, or mushroom) leading to the underground realm is "frequent" in Sicilian tales.

==== The heroine's tasks ====
A motif that appears in the tale type is that the heroine must travel to another witch's house and fetch from there a box or casket she must not open. German folklorist Hans-Jörg Uther remarked that these motives ("the quest for the casket" and the visit to the second witch) are "the essential feature" of the subtype.

Catalan scholarship locates the motif of the box of musical instruments in Greek, Turkish and South Italian variants. In that regard, Swahn, in his study on Cupid and Psyche, remarked that the instruments as the contents of the box are "common" to Mediterranean tradition.

==== The delayed pregnancy ====
This form of startling the mother-in-law into allowing the baby's birth is found in Italian fairy tales; usually it is done by announcing the birth. In English and Scandinavian ballads, such as Willie's Lady, the mother-in-law must be startled so that she will accidentally reveal the charms she is using against the birth. This motif has been compared to the myth of Hercules's human mother, Alcmene, who could not bear him due to a curse by goddess Lucina. Also, the trickery of ringing the bells twice, the first time for the false mourning, the second for the heroes' victory and the son's birth, "reflects" the Mediterranean rendition of the myth, which appears in Sicilian stories. Similarly, according to Luisa Rubini, the motif of the queen preventing the heroine from giving birth by clasping her hands harks back to "an old Greek belief", also found in the myth of Hercules and his mother Alcmene.

== Variants ==
=== King Goldfinch ===
Swiss-German author Laura Gonzenbach collected a Sicilian tale she titled Der König Stieglitz ("King Goldfinch"). In this story, a poor shoemaker sits on a rock to lament his lack of work and suddenly a youth appears, named Cardiddu, saying that the shoemaker called out his name. The youth guides the shoemaker to his rich underground palace and lets him take some riches with him. The youth tells him that he wants to marry the shoemaker's third and youngest daughter. The shoemaker agrees and returns home to explain the situation to his daughters. The third one marries the mysterious youth and they live a good life, but her husband orders her not to open a certain door. He explains that he was a king, banished to this underground castle by mamma draja, a witch who wants him to marry her daughter. King Cardiddu leaves for some days and his wife is visited by her sisters. They try to convince their sister to open the door, but she refuses. One night, spurred by curiosity, she lights a candle to see if her husband was asleep. One drop of wax falls on his head and she finds herself out in the forest, the castle having disappeared. King Cardiddu admonishes her and tells her to follow the trail to the witch who enchanted him, and make her swear on his name to avoid being eaten by her. She does as instructed and the witch takes her as her servant. The witch forces her to do difficult tasks, which she accomplishes with her husband's help: first, she has to sweep and not sweep the floor, while the witch is away. The girl sits down to weep as King Cardiddu appears to her, mocking her for listening to her sisters' words. Despite his initial harsh treatment, he tells her to sweep the whole house, gather the trash and let it roll downstairs. Next, she is to light the fire and not light it; Cardiddu tells her to place some firewood in the fireplace, set up the cauldron and place some matches nearby, without kindling them. Thirdly, she is to make and not make the bed; Cardiddu tells her to fold the bedsheets, but leave the mattresses untouched. The next day, the witch smears her clothes with oxen's blood and delivers a large pile of them for the girl to wash, whiten, sew, iron and fold them; fourthly, on the day after, unmake the mattresses, take their wool and wash them, then iron and fold the bedsheets. On both tasks, Cardiddu advises her to go up the mountain and tell the king of the birds King Cardiddu sent her; the birds will come and help her. Finally, the witch forces her daughter-in-law to take a letter and a box to the witch's sister, also a witch. On her way, curiosity gets the better of her and she opens the box, which begins to ring. Her husband appears and silences it. She delivers the box to the witch and returns to the mamma draja, who has made the preparations for the marriage between her daughter and King Cardiddu. The woman is to hold burning candles at the foot of the bridal bed during the nuptial night, but King Cardiddu knows it is a trap, since the ground will open up to swallow the human girl, so he makes the mamma draja's daughter change places with the woman. The witch's daughter falls into the trap and the couple escape from the house by transforming into different things - a sequence that appears in tale type ATU 313, "The Magic Flight": first, a garden (the girl) and a gardener (Cardiddu), then a church (her) and a priest (him), lastly an eel (her) and a pond (him). The ogress tries to catch the eel and fails, returning home empty-handed. However, the ogress then places her hands between her knees and utters a curse for Cardiddu's wife not to bear her child until the ogress removes her hands from their current position. King Cardiddu's wife is pregnant, but she cannot bear her son, so the king orders the church bells to ring and sends a servant to the ogress's house. The servant lies to the creature King Cardiddu is dead, and she claps her hands in victory. King Cardiddu's baby is born, the church bells ring in celebration, and the servant tells the ogress Cardiddu's son is born. Defeated, the ogress hits her head on the wall and dies. The tale was later translated into Italian language as Re Cardiddu ("King Goldfinch"). Scholar Jack Zipes translated the tale as King Cardiddu and classified it as type ATU 425A, "The Animal as Bridegroom", with an episode of type 313, "The Girl as Helper in the Hero's Flight".

=== Filo d'Oro ===
In a variant collected by Domenico Comparetti from Basilicata with the title Filo d'Oro, a poor shoemaker has an only daughter. Her mother sends her to the garden to find cabbages for their soup, but she pushes a bush and leaves a golden coin to compensate for the lost herb. Suddenly, a handsome youth appears out of the ground and asks the girl to accompany him to an underground place. The youth says he was cursed by his mother to be seen by only one woman, for his mother, an ogress, was told of the fairy's prophecy about his future betrothed: the shoemaker's daughter. The girl returns home, tells her family everything and her mother wants to see this youth. The next day, when the girl pushes the herb and leaves the coin, the mother hides behind a tree to see Filo d'Oro. Nothing happens, so the mother throws a nut and the man appears. He scolds his beloved and disappears. The girl goes on a journey to seek him, and rests by a tree. She overhears two birds talking that Filo d'Oro is dead, but if one can kill the birds, burn their ashes and mingle with Filo d'Oro's, can resurrect him. She meets the fairies who prophesied Filo d'Oro's future and give her a fig to use on his ogress mother. The girl finds the ogress mother and makes her swear on her son's soul. The ogress learns she is her daughter-in-law, takes the birds's ashes and resurrects her son. She locks him up and forces the girl to do some tasks: first, to fulfill mattresses with bird feathers, next, to go to the "montagna del Piacere" and get a box with instruments ("in uno scatoline il suono e il canto") from the ogress's sister. Unbeknownst to the girl, her beloved Filo d'Oro, under a new form, helps her on both occasions: for the first, the disguised Filo d'Oro asks her for a kiss, but his wife refuses to betray Filo d'Oro; for the second, he advises her to pass the mountain of serpents and say the snakes are a dish of macaroni she would eat, then pass by the mountain of blood and say it contains wine she would like to drink from, pass by the mountain of bile and say it contains milk she would take three drinks from, gives her a shovel, and departs. Filo d'Oro's wife follows his instructions to the letter and enters the ogress's sister's house, where she meets a woman by an oven, to whom she gives the shovel and gains the box in return. The girl rushes back down the mountain, as the ogress's sister commands her servants to stop her, to no avail. At a distance, the girl opens the lid of the box to see what is inside, releasing the instruments into the air. Filo d'Oro, under another disguise, appears to her and promises to lock everything back into the box in exchange for a kiss. His wife denies him, but he does as promised, and locks up the instruments back into the box. Later, she learns Filo d'Oro is safe and sound, but that she is to hold some candles on the wedding his mother set for him. Filo d'Oro asks the false bride to trade places with his wife, thus the false bride holds the candles. When midnight strikes, the false bride is swallowed by the earth and the lovers escape, thinking it is their victory, but the ogress curses her daughter-in-law to die in childbirth - revertible only if the ogress puts both hands on her head. Later, as a last trick on her mother-in-law, the girl fakes that she is in mourning, returns to the ogress's house and tells her her son is dead again. The ogress mother puts both hands on her head, thus breaking the curse. Author Italo Calvino adapted the tale as Filo d'Oro and Filomena, where the heroine is ordered to go to "Montagna del Divertimento". Calvino remarked that it was related to "Amor and Psyche" cycle of stories.

=== Spiccatamunnu ===
In another tale collected by Pitrè, Spiccatamunnu, sourced from Palermo, the heroine, Rusidda, marries a mysterious man. Incited by her sisters, Rusidda makes the only mistake she should not have made: she asks her husband's name. As soon as he answers "Spiccatamunnu", their splendid palace disappears and she is now alone. Rusidda arrives at an ogress's house, her mother-in-law. She sends her to get a casket from her sister. The girl gets the casket and, on the way, opens it to satisfy her curiosity: an army of little dolls jump out of the box and begin to dance. Rusidda tries to contain them and put them back in the box, to no avail. Suddenly, her husband Spiccatamunnu throws her a cane and instructs her to beat it on the ground, and the little dolls will return to the box. It just so happens. After she gives the casket to her mother-in-law, the ogress announces that her son is to be married to another person, and orders Rusidda to hold a torch by their bridal bed, in a kneeling position. Spiccatamunnu's new fiancée, seeing Rusidda's suffering, takes pity on the girl and takes her place holding the torch. Outside, the ogress mother commands the ground to open up and swallow whoever is holding up the torch.

=== Bellubeldomine e Donna Dubbana Manna ===
In a Sardinian tale from Martis titled Bellubeldomine e Donna Dubbana Manna, Bellubeldomine is the son of Donna Dubbana Manna, a rich woman who is "half-sorceress, half-witch". One day, a girl named Mariedda comes into her service, and Donna Dubbana Manna gives her a basket of clothes and orders her to wash them with no water and dry them without sunlight. The girl then meets Bellubeldomine, who offers his help in exchange for a kiss. Mariedda refuses his kiss, but he helps her at any rate: they sit for a picnic, she falls asleep, and he fulfills the task for her. The youth warns her that, if his mother suspects something, Mariedda is to answer she never saw him. The girl brings the basket to Donna, who, just as her son predicted, suspects her servant had help, but Mariedda pretends she never saw Bellubeldomine. The story then explains Bellubeldomine is set to be married to another girl in the upcoming days. Thus, Donna Dubbana Manna orders the girl to go to the garden and fill a mattress and two pillows with bird feathers. Mariedda complains that such a task would take a month, but her employer wants it done by morning. The girl goes to the garden to try and catch some birds, but they fly away. Bellubeldomine approaches her with the same help offer. She refuses his advances, but he helps her: they sit for a picnic, and he tells her she has to pretend he is dead and shout that Bellubeldomine is dead, for all the birds in the world will come and give their feathers. It happens thus. For the next task, Donna Dubbana Manna marries her son to a bride and forces Mariedda to hold torches to illuminate the wedding couple for the whole night. Bellubeldomine approaches Mariedda and offers to remove the torches from her hands in exchange for a kiss, which she denies him. Still, Bellubeldomine asks his bride to trade places with Mariedda so that she can rest a while. Mariedda sleeps next to the bed, while the bride holds the torches. In the morning, the sorceress utters a spell so that the one holding the torches is transformed into ox manure, thinking that it is Mariedda that is still in the position of torch-bearer. Thus, as soon as it happens, Bellubeldomine's bride turns into manure, while Mariedda survives the sorceress's trap. Later, Mariedda marries Bellubeldomine, but his mother places her hand on her womb, cursing her not to give birth to her grandson. In order to help his wife, Bellubeldomine convinces a group of boys to cause a ruckus shouting that his mother's palace is on fire. The boys do as instructed and, in the confusion, Donna Dubbana Manna unclasps her hands, allowing her daughter-in-law to finally give birth. Realizing she has been tricked, she returns to her palace and dies in a fit of rage. Mariedda and Bellubeldomine are free to live their lives.

=== The Tale of Pantaniello ===
In an Italian tale collected from Benevento with the title Il cunto di Pantaniello ("The Tale of Pantaniello), a mother has a daughter named Teresina, who has a boyfriend. Due to their poor conditions, the mother sends Teresina to live with and work for a lady, unaware the lady is Zia Orca, who could devour the girl. Zia Orca has a son, Pantaniello, who is sixteen and engaged to another girl, while Teresina is fifteen. Pantaniello tells Teresina his mother could devour her, and advises her to obey his mother's orders. The following day, Zia Orca shows Teresina a room full of wool and orders her to spin all the wool for her son's upcoming marriage, lest she devours the girl. Teresina starts to work, but realizes she would never finish it in time. Suddenly, Pantaniello shouts for her under the balcony, asking her to let down her braids, so that he can climb up to her. Pantaniello asks Teresina (whom he calls Teresinella) what is the matter, and is told about the amount of wool the girl has to spin in a whole night. He promises to help her, only if he kisses her. Teresina rebuffs him, saying she would rather die than kiss him. Still, he helps her: he whistles and many people appear to spin the wool. Pantaniello's fiancée arrives, learns of how Teresina denies Pantaniello, and mocks the girl, saying she herself kissed a chestnut seller a hundred times for a single chestnut. Pantaniello hears the words, but stay still. The following morning, Zia Orca sees that the wool has been spun and accuses Teresina that this was her son's doing. Thus, the next day, Zia Orca takes Teresina to a room filled with heaps of mixed seeds (wheat grains, lupin beans, fava beans, chickpeas and lentils) and orders her to sort it in sacks by type, lest she devours the girl. Teresina starts her work, Pantaniello asks her to let down her braids, climbs up the room and offers to help Teresinella in exchange for a kiss. Once again, Teresina rebuff him, but he helps her anyway: he summons an army of ants which start to separate the grains. Pantaniello's fiancée arrives, learns about the task, and mocks Teresina for refusing to kiss him, since she herself kissed a walnut seller a hundred times for a single walnut. Zia Orca arrives, sees that the task is done, and suspects this was her son's doing. Zia Orca then leads Teresina to a room and orders her to make two feather pillows for her son, lest she is devoured. Teresina questions herself whether she can find feathers in this room, when Pantaniello shouts under the balcony for the girl to let down her braids, he climbs up and offers his help, in exchange for a kiss. Teresina refuses, but Pantaniello helps her anyway: he whistles, and flocks of birds appear, pluck their own feathers, then leave. Pantaniello's fiancée appears and mocks Teresina's refusal by saying she herself gave musicians a hundred kisses for a serenade. Zia Orca sees that the task is done and becomes furious, but hatches a plan: since it is Sunday and her son is to be married, she sends Teresina to Mamma Orca, for her to be devoured, with the pretext of fetching the "suoni" (the musical instruments) for the wedding. Pantaniello intercepts Teresina and warns that Mamma Orca is an even more ravenous ogress, advises her to fetch the instruments located behind the door while the ogress goes upstairs, and leave at once. He also gives her a piece of soap, a bone, and a cloth, for her to give respectively to two quarreling washerwomen, to a hungry dog, and to use the cloth to dry up a river. Teresina follows Pantaniello's instructions to the letter and goes to meet Mamma Orca. The creature asks Teresina to wait while she goes to sharpen her teeth in another room; Teresina steals the instruments behind a door and rushes back. Mamma Orca then orders her servants (the river, the dog and the washerwomen) to stop her, to no avail. Lastly, Zia Orca marries Pantaniello to his fiancée, but the youth takes Teresina to his bed instead and drives his fiancée away. The following morning, Zia Orca enters her son's room and discovers Teresina with Pantaniello. For this, she tears her hair and curses Teresina not to bear any children. Nine months pass, and Teresina cannot give birth, so people weep and funeral bells ring. The curse can only be lifted if Zia Orca tears her hairs again, so a midwife approaches Pantaniello and asks him if his mother would weep if she believed he was dead. Pantaniello assents, so the midwife advises them to put a log in a sack, drop down the stairs and shout that Pantaniello fell down and died. It happens thus, and Zia Orca despairs at her son's "death", clutching tufts of her own hair. By doing so, Teresina gives birth to a baby boy. Pantaniello appears to his mother and confronts her about his former fiancée, who kissed the chestnut seller, the walnut seller, and the musicians, so he chose Teresinella, innocent and pure. Zia Orca concedes defeat and accepts Pantaniello's choice.

== See also ==
- Graciosa and Percinet
- The Green Serpent
- Ulv Kongesøn (Prince Wolf)
- The Golden Root
- The Horse-Devil and the Witch
- Khastakhumar and Bibinagar
- Habrmani
- The Son of the Ogress
- Yasmin and the Serpent Prince
- Prunella
- The Little Girl Sold with the Pears
- La Fada Morgana
- The Enchanted Canary
- The Magic Swan Geese
- The Witch
- The Old Witch
