= Behind the Cow =

Single by Scooter featuring Fatman Scoop

from the album The Ultimate Aural Orgasm
- B-side: "Taj Mahal"
- Released: 19 January 2007
- Recorded: 2006
- Studio: Sheffield Underground Studios
- Genre: Hard dance; Eurodance; progressive trance
- Length: 3:36
- Label: Sheffield Tunes
- Songwriters: Hans Geerdes; Rick Jordan; Michael Simon; Jens Thele; Isaac Freeman
- Producers: Rick J. Jordan; Michael Simon; H. P. Baxxter; Jens Thele

Scooter singles chronology
"Apache Rocks the Bottom!" (2005)	"Behind the Cow" (2007)	"Lass uns tanzen" (2007)

Fatman Scoop singles chronology
"Dance!" (2006)	"Behind the Cow" (2007)	"Please Don't Break My Heart" (2010)

"Behind the Cow" is a song by German band Scooter featuring American hip hop artist Fatman Scoop. Premiered at The Dome 40 in Düsseldorf on 1 December 2006, it was released on 19 January 2007 as the lead single from Scooter's twelfth studio album The Ultimate Aural Orgasm. Jeff "Mantas" Dunn plays guitar on the track. "Behind the Cow" samples music and lyrics from the KLF song "What Time Is Love?" and music from Blue Öyster Cult song "(Don't Fear) The Reaper".

== Music video ==
The video was filmed in India, where the band caused controversy by painting a cow, an animal considered holy in India.

== Track listing ==
CD single & Download

1. "Behind the Cow" (Radio Version) – 3:36
2. "Behind the Cow" (Extended Version) – 6:33
3. "Behind the Cow" (Spencer & Hill Bigroom Mix) – 6:32
4. "Behind the Cow" (Spencer & Hill Dub Radio Edit) – 2:54
5. "Taj Mahal" – 3:27

12-inch

1. "Behind the Cow" (Extended Version) – 6:22
2. "Behind the Cow" (Spencer & Hill Bigroom Mix) – 6:32
3. "Behind the Cow" (Spencer & Hill Dub Mix) – 5:57

== Charts ==
Chart performance for "Behind the Cow"
Chart (2007)	Peak position
Austria (Ö3 Austria Top 40)	22
Czech Republic Airplay (ČNS IFPI)	73
European Hot 100 Singles (Billboard)	53
Finland (Suomen virallinen lista)	3
Germany (GfK)	17
Hungary (Single Top 40)	3
Netherlands (Single Top 100)	54
Sweden (Sverigetopplistan)	59
Switzerland (Schweizer Hitparade)	78
