= Jumping All Over the World (song) =

2008 single by Scooter

Single by Scooter

from the album Jumping All Over the World
- B-side: "Tribal Tango"; "B.O.B."
- Released: 1 February 2008
- Genre: Jumpstyle
- Length: 3:46
- Label: Sheffield Tunes
- Songwriters: Georg Kajanus; H. P. Baxxter; Rick J. Jordan; Michael Simon; Jens Thele
- Producers: Rick J. Jordan; Michael Simon

Scooter singles chronology
"And No Matches" (2007)	"Jumping All Over the World" (2008)	"I'm Lonely" (2008)

Music video
- "Jumping All Over the World" on YouTube

"Jumping All Over the World" is a song by German musical group Scooter, taken from their 13th studio album, Jumping All Over the World (2007). In the United Kingdom, it was the band's highest-charting single in five years, reaching number 28 on the UK Singles Chart. The radio edit of the song features an extra verse, an altered opening, and an added crowd chorus near the end of the song. This differs from the album edit that has only one verse and no crowd chorus.

== Samples used ==
- The four bar melody (played at two different intervals in the song) is based on the hardstyle track "Rock Civilization" by Headhunterz, released in June 2007.
- "Jumping All Over the World" is based around a sample from the song "A Glass of Champagne" written by Georg Kajanus for the pop group Sailor, taken from their 1975 album Trouble.
- The rhythm used for the lyrics in the first verse is based on the one used for the lyrics of the hardstyle track "Front 2 Back" by DJ Zany & Tatanka, released in October 2006.
- "B.O.B." samples "Laura Palmer's Theme" from the American television series Twin Peaks. The title is a reference to Killer Bob, a character in the show.

== Music video ==
The music video features lead Scooter singer H.P. Baxxter rapping, while the Sheffield Jumpers are Jumping at different sites in the world. The Sheffield Jumpers were actually sent to these locations, such as India, Japan, Russia, and the United Kingdom. Concert footage is also used.

== Track listings ==
CD maxi
No.	Title	Length
1.	"Jumping All Over the World" (radio edit)	3:46
2.	"Jumping All Over the World" (Jacques Renault Club Mix)	5:56
3.	"Jumping All Over the World" (Extended Mix)	5:43
4.	"Tribal Tango"	3:50
5.	"B.O.B."	3:41

12-inch
No.	Title	Length
1.	"Jumping All Over the World" (Extended Mix)	5:43
2.	"Jumping All Over the World" (Jacques Renault Club Mix)	5:56

Download
No.	Title	Length
1.	"Jumping All Over the World" (radio edit)	3:46
2.	"Jumping All Over the World" (Jacques Renault Club Mix)	5:56
3.	"Jumping All Over the World" (Extended Mix)	5:43
4.	"Tribal Tango"	3:50

UK CD maxi / UK Download
No.	Title	Length
1.	"Jumping All Over the World" (radio edit)	3:46
2.	"Jumping All Over the World" (Jacques Renault Club Mix)	5:56
3.	"Jumping All Over the World" (Extended Mix)	5:43
4.	"Jumping All Over the World" (Fugitives 80's Style Remix)	5:53
5.	"Jumping All Over the World" (Alex K Remix)	6:35

== Charts ==
=== Weekly charts ===
Weekly chart performance for "Jumping All Over the World"
Chart (2008)	Peak position
Austria (Ö3 Austria Top 40)	23
European Hot 100 Singles (Billboard)	58
Germany (GfK)	15
Ireland (IRMA)	10
UK Singles (OCC)	28

=== Year-end charts ===
Year-end chart performance for "Jumping All Over the World"
Chart (2008)	Position
UK Singles (OCC)	183

== Certifications ==
Certifications for "Jumping All Over the World"
Region	Certification	Certified units/sales
United Kingdom (BPI)	Gold	400,000^{‡}
^{‡} Sales+streaming figures based on certification alone.
