= Lass uns tanzen =

Single by Scooter

from the album The Ultimate Aural Orgasm
- B-side: "Te Quiero"
- Released: 26 March 2007
- Recorded: 2006
- Studio: Sheffield Underground Studios
- Length: 3:42
- Label: Sheffield Tunes
- Songwriters: H.P. Baxxter; Rick J. Jordan; Michael Simon; Jens Thele
- Producers: Rick J. Jordan; Michael Simon

Scooter singles chronology
"Behind the Cow" (2007)	"Lass uns tanzen" (2007)	"The Question Is What Is the Question?" (2007)

"Lass uns Tanzen" ("Let's Dance") is a song by German band Scooter. It was released on 26 March 2007, as the second and last single from their twelfth studio album The Ultimate Aural Orgasm.

== Track listing ==
CD single

1. "Lass uns Tanzen" (Radio Edit) – 3:43
2. "Lass uns Tanzen" (Alternative Club Mix) – 5:22
3. "Lass uns Tanzen" (DJ Zany Remix) – 6:38
4. "Te Quiero" – 6:25

12" vinyl

1. "Lass uns Tanzen" (DJ Zany Remix) – 6:38
2. "Lass uns Tanzen" (Extended Mix) – 4:52
3. "Lass uns Tanzen" (Tom Novy's New HP Invent Mix) – 6:43
4. "Lass uns Tanzen" (Hardwell & Greatski Late at Night Remix) – 6:34

Digital download

1. "Lass uns Tanzen" (Radio Edit) – 3:43
2. "Lass uns Tanzen" (Alternative Club Mix) – 5:22
3. "Lass uns Tanzen" (DJ Zany Remix) – 6:38
4. "Te Quiero" – 6:25
5. "Lass uns Tanzen" (Tom Novy's New HP Invent Mix) – 6:43

== Notes ==
- "Lass uns Tanzen" samples the song "Disco Band" by the Italo disco group Scotch. "Lass uns tanzen" was later used as the basis for the Scooter remixes of Lützenkirchen's "3 Tage Wach" (in 2008) and Rammstein's "Pussy" (in 2009). In 2009 it was once again used in the band's cover of Die Fantastischen Vier's "Troy" for the tribute album A Tribute To Die Fantastischen Vier.
- The song has only one lyric: "Lass uns tanzen oder ficken oder beides, denn morgen sind wir tot". The line is repeated a multitude of times throughout the song, sometimes in a different order. The line translates to "Let us dance or fuck or both, for tomorrow we will be dead."
- There are two versions of the song. The radio version, also known as the "Day Version", censors the word "ficken". The "Night Version" is in fact the album version, and leaves the word uncensored.

== Charts ==
Chart performance for "Lass uns tanzen"
Chart (2007)	Peak position
Austria (Ö3 Austria Top 40)	41
European Hot 100 Singles (Billboard)	70
Finland (Suomen virallinen lista)	10
Germany (GfK)	19
Hungary (Dance Top 40)	29
