= Rock Civilization =

Single by Headhunterz
- A-side: "Rock Civilization"
- B-side: "Speakafreak"
- Released: June 18, 2007
- Genre: Hardstyle
- Length: 5:53
- Label: Scantraxx Reloaded
- Songwriter: Willem Rebergen
- Producer: Headhunterz

Headhunterz singles chronology
"High Rollerz" (2007)	"Rock Civilization" (2007)	"The Power of the Mind" (2007)

"Rock Civilization" is a hardstyle track released on June 18, 2007, by Headhunterz through the Scantraxx sublabel Scantraxx Reloaded. It was featured on The Best of Headhunterz.

German band Scooter covered the melody of "Rock Civilization" for their single "Jumping All Over the World". Italian artist Technoboy remixed "Rock Civilization" for Scantraxx Reloaded 023, released on November 5, 2009.
