= I am lonely will anyone speak to me =

Forum thread about loneliness

"i am lonely will anyone speak to me" was the title of an online forum thread first posted on July 14, 2004 on moviecodec.com, a video codec downloads site. The thread expanded into a discussion for lonely people, and became the first result when the phrase "I am lonely" was entered into the Google search engine. It was described as "the web's top hangout for lonely folk".

Participants added their own comments, such as: "My wife is gone for the night", "I feel like a floating piece of dust in outer space", and "I'm in the final year of my Ph.D., I have no life, and I am broken up with my gf because she joined a cult". Regular participants in the thread created a recommended reading list for lonely people including J. D. Salinger, John Steinbeck, and the novel Follow Your Heart.

The thread was featured in the magazines Wired, Guardian Unlimited, and The New Yorker. Bjarne Lundgren, the webmaster of Moviecodec.com, stated, "Like-minded people tend to flock together and, in this case, Google helped in flocking them together on my site".

Mark Griffiths, a researcher in internet psychology at Nottingham Trent University in the UK, also addressed this question, stating: "There are a lot of lonely people out there. Some people rely heavily on technology and end up treating it as an electronic friend, a sounding board—just writing it down can make you feel better... That doesn't change their psychological world at that moment, but creating a kinship with like-minded people can help. You're all in this virtual space together."

Due to its large community, Bjarne created a new forum entitled "A Lonely Life", for the thread's numerous lonely inhabitants to move to. The original thread was later moved to Moviecodec.com's branch site, The Lounge Forums, but as of December 24, 2016, the website the thread is hosted on was shut down and can no longer be accessed.

== See also ==
- Loneliness
