= Call Me Mañana =

1999 single by Scooter

Single by Scooter

from the album No Time to Chill
- B-side: "Bramfeld"
- Released: 8 January 1999
- Genre: Hard Trance
- Length: 3:40
- Label: Club Tools
- Songwriters: H. P. Baxxter; Rick J. Jordan; Axel Coon; Jens Thele

Scooter singles chronology
| "We Are the Greatest/I Was Made for Lovin' You" (1998) | "Call Me Mañana" (1999) | "Faster Harder Scooter" (1999) |

"Call Me Mañana" is a song by German group Scooter. It was released in January 1999 as the third and final single from the 1998 album No Time to Chill. The melodic theme of the track is a sample from L.A. Style's 1991 single "James Brown Is Dead".

== Track listings ==
CD single

1. "Call Me Mañana" (Heavy Horses radio) – 3:40
2. "Call Me Mañana" (Heavy Horses extended) – 5:36
3. "Bramfeld" – 5:16

12-inch

1. "Call Me Mañana" (Heavy Horses extended) – 5:36
2. "Bramfeld" – 5:16
3. "Call Me Mañana" (Heavy Horses radio) – 3:40

== Charts ==
=== Weekly charts ===
Weekly chart performance for "Call Me Mañana"
| Chart (1999) | Peak position |
|---|---|
| Austria (Ö3 Austria Top 40) | 24 |
| Belgium (Ultratop 50 Flanders) | 10 |
| Finland (Suomen virallinen lista) | 7 |
| Germany (GfK) | 16 |
| Sweden (Sverigetopplistan) | 6 |
| Switzerland (Schweizer Hitparade) | 25 |

=== Year-end charts ===
Year-end chart performance for "Call Me Mañana"
| Chart (1999) | Position |
|---|---|
| Belgium (Ultratop 50 Flanders) | 76 |
| Sweden (Hitlistan) | 43 |

== Certifications ==
Certifications for "Call Me Mañana"
| Region | Certification | Certified units/sales |
|---|---|---|
| Sweden (GLF) | Gold | 15,000^{^} |
^{^} Shipments figures based on certification alone.
