= Jumpstyle =

EDM music genre and associated dance style

- Stylistic origins: Mákina; gabber; hardstyle; hardcore; hard house; tech trance; industrial; techno
- Cultural origins: Late 1990s–2000s in Belgium and Netherlands

Fusion genres
- Melbourne bounce

Regional scenes
- Belgium; Netherlands; Ireland; Germany; United Kingdom; Russia; Poland; France; Denmark; Australia; Luxembourg

Other topics
- Yabujincore

Jumpstyle is a subgenre of electronic dance music that emerged in Western Europe in the late 1990s, particularly in Belgium and the Netherlands. It is associated with a distinctive dance style commonly referred to as jumpen.

The genre developed within the broader European hard dance scene and became commercially prominent during the mid-2000s. In the 2020s, it experienced a revival pioneered by Lithuanian rapper Yabujin.

== History ==
=== Late 1990s–early 2000s: Origins ===
Jumpstyle is sometimes described as having roots in Chicago hard house, though it developed its distinct identity in Europe. The style emerged in Belgium around 1997–1998, where artists such as Da Boy Tommy helped popularise the term "jumpstyle". In its early form, the genre remained relatively niche.

During the early 2000s, further stylistic development in Germany and the Netherlands contributed to its growing popularity across Europe.

=== 2006–2008: Commercial peak ===
Jumpstyle reached a commercial peak between 2006 and 2008. DJs Ruthless and Vorwerk, who produced as Jeckyll & Hyde, released "Frozen Flame" and "Freefall", both of which became hits in the Netherlands. Jeckyll & Hyde would eventually become a live act which Ruthless & Vorwerk were not a part of. Patrick Jumpen also achieved chart success with tracks such as "The Secret" and "Holiday".

The German rave band Scooter contributed significantly to the genre's international exposure with singles including "The Question Is What Is the Question?" and "Jumping All Over the World". Their 2007 album Jumping All Over the World reached number one on the UK Albums Chart.

During this period, crossover experimentation increased. Several hands up producers, including Jens O., Bangbros, and Megastylez, incorporated jumpstyle elements into their productions. The compilation series Jumpstylemania, released by Club Tools between 2007 and 2008, documented the genre’s commercial prominence.

=== 2010s–2020s ===
By the early 2010s, jumpstyle's mainstream commercial presence had declined. Dedicated communities and online radio stations continued to support the genre, including JumpStation.FM, which operated from 2005 until 2016. The style has also been fused with other genres. For example, Major Lazer and The Partysquad incorporated jumpstyle and hardstyle influences into the track "Original Don", and Joel Fletcher’s remix of Savage’s "Swing" features jumpstyle-inspired elements.

In the early 2020s, the style experienced renewed online attention through Lithuanian rapper Yabujin who experimented with jumpstyle-inspired production under the alias DJ Gyrotta Zao. His style contributed to a "TikTok genre" referred to as "Yabujin-core", which gained traction on TikTok.

== Music ==
Jumpstyle developed from tech-trance, hardstyle, gabber, and mákina. Its tempo typically ranges between 140 and 150 BPM. While it shares characteristics with gabber, it is not simply a slowed-down form of that genre.

The style commonly features a 909 kick drum in a four-on-the-floor rhythm. It also incorporates elements from hard house and, in later developments, electro house. From around 2002–2003 onward, jumpstyle increasingly reflected hardstyle influences, including pitched basslines, melodic structures, multiband distortion, and synthesizers utilising square waveforms.

== Dance ==
The dance associated with jumpstyle is often referred to as jumpen, derived from the English word "jump" combined with the Dutch and German infinitive suffix "-en".

It is characterised by energetic jumps, fast kicks, and rotational footwork performed in time with the music. Dancers typically maintain a relatively stiff upper body, with most expressive movement concentrated in the legs.

Several stylistic variants exist, including oldschool, hardjump, ownstyle, and freestyle. A performance involving two dancers is commonly referred to as a "duojump". Practitioners are often called "jumpers".

=== Tournaments and competitions ===
Jumpstyle competitions are frequently organised through online video submissions and internet-based contests. In Belgium, staged tournaments have been held, including the European Jump Masters.

Online communities such as jumpstylers.ru began hosting online competitions and tournaments such as the World Sidejump League or WSJL, where dancers all around the world competed for the top spot.

Despite competitions being held mostly online, some competitions did take place in real life, such as the Urban Dance Fire which took place in Moscow in 2016.

=== Jumpstyle groups and teams ===
Jumpstyle groups, such as the Russian Harddance Generation, One Style Brothers, and the Los Angeles Hardjumperz were formed. These groups sometimes held meetings in public places such as parks.

The most notable group that is still active to this day is a group known as the Atomic Destination Team, which originated from Poland in 2009. The group posts about the dance on social media platforms such as TikTok and Instagram.

Jumpstyle movies also exist, in which a dancer showcases one's skill, which is sometimes accompanied by visual effects and edits to make the movie more visually appealing. Some jumpstyle movies also showcase the skill of other jumpers around the world.

=== Notable figures ===
Notable jumpers such as Scot and Jagr became prominent in the jumpstyle scene by participating in online tournaments and competitions. Many other notable jumpers exist, such as Vedr from Serbia, who was even featured on a talent show.

== Related genres ==
=== Yabujincore ===
Yabujincore (also known as Yabujin-core or Yabujin jumpstyle) is an Internet music-based style of jumpstyle pioneered by Lithuanian rapper Yabujin. The style emerged through Yabujin's jumpstyle songs under the alias DJ GYROTTA ZAO, which according to Pitchfork spawned a "TikTok genre" referred to as "Yabujin-core". British magazine Dazed noted the style as "Yabujin jumpstyle", defined as "a niche internet movement", adding that "the yabujin community thrives on platforms like TikTok and Discord, offering a virtual space for fans of hardstyle music".
