= Bots (band) =

Dutch rock band

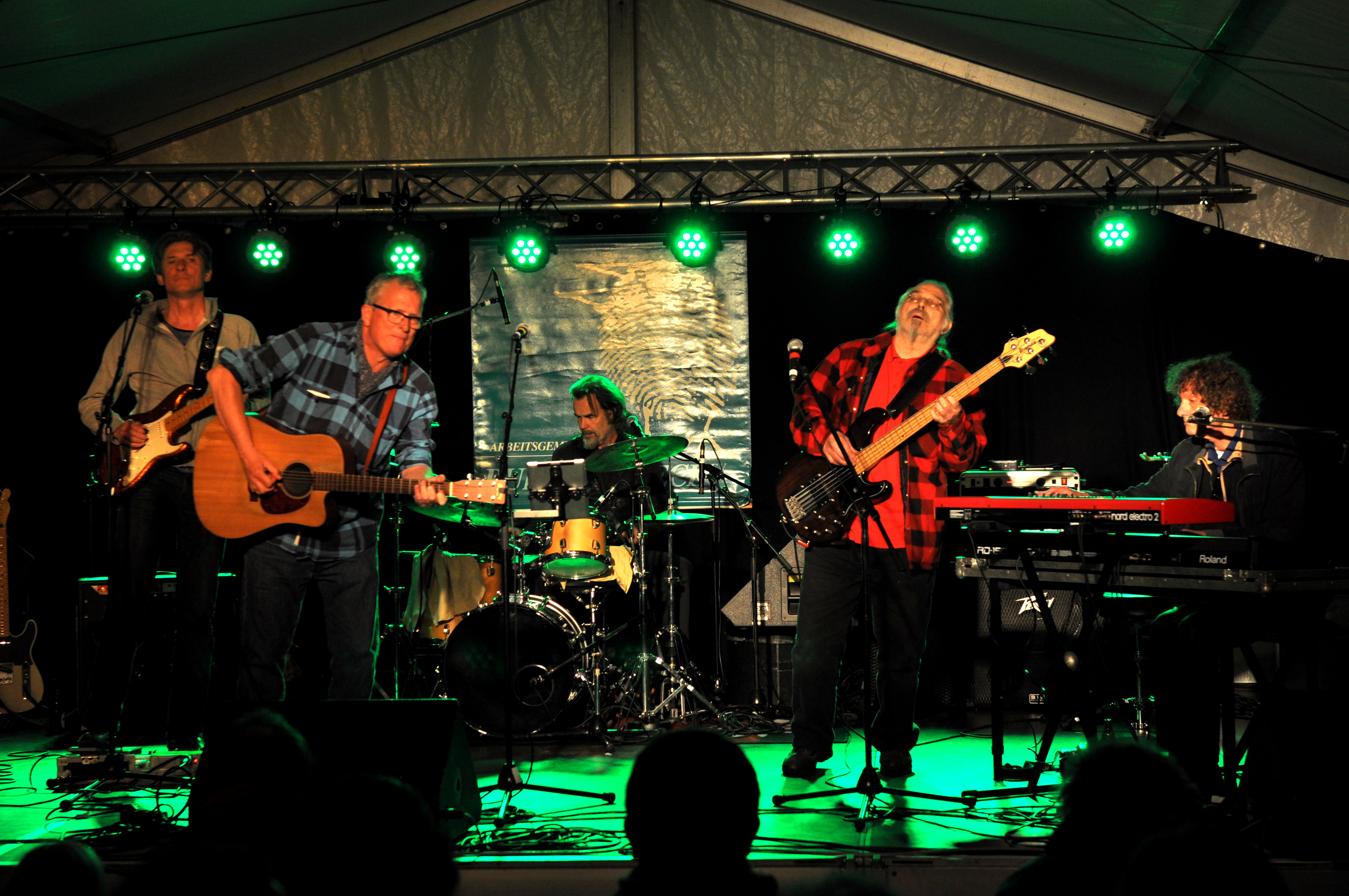
Bots at the song festival 2016 at Waldeck castle, Germany

Bots is a Dutch language folk rock group from the southern city of Eindhoven that is successful in both the Netherlands and Germany. The band was formed in 1974 by Hans Sanders, and is mainly known for their cover of the Breton folk song Son ar Chistr titled "Zeven Dagen Lang" ("Sieben Tage Lang" in German, "Seven Days Long" in English), which they recorded in Dutch in 1975 then again in German in 1980 as a political peace movement song. The first albums were produced by Peter Koelewijn. In 2005 a new version of "Zeven Dagen Lang" was recorded with the rapper Ali B on the occasion of the Muziek10Daagse. On 3 November 2007 Hans Sanders died at the age of 61.

== Biography ==
=== 1970s ===
Bots was formed in 1974 by Bonkie Bongaerts and Bertus Borgers. After leaving the band Dirty Underwear, Hans Sanders – stuck with a band with no pianist and no saxophone support – chose to team up with Bonkie Bongaerts and form the new group Bots (Dutch botsen: "to clash" / BO-nkie Bongaer-TS).

In 1975 the band recorded its first album, Van Kwaad Tot Erger (From Bad To Worse), with producer Peter Koelewijn. The album places Bots in the centre of attention and the band also makes its debut on national TV. The singles "Het Lied Van De Werkende Jeugd" ("The Song Of The Working Youth") and "De Man" ("The Man") are released. The band tours frequently, also in Belgium. By this time Hans Sanders started to claim texts and lyrics he did not actually write. This was only discovered in 1981 when gold-record awards resulted in increased payments for Hans Sanders but not for the other band members.

In 1976 the song "Zeven Dagen Lang" ("Seven Days On End"), a cover version of the Breton folk song Son ar Chistr popularised by singer-songwriter Alan Stivell and Bots' best known song today, ended up on the album Voor God En Vaderland (For God And Country). Co-producer of the album was Peter Koelewijn. The single reached number 23 in the charts. Themes on the album included feminism, racism, solidarity and militarism. The music showed influences of both folk and pop.

In 1977 Bots toured East Germany. Bots recorded the poem "Rond" ("Round") by Bert Schierbeek.

In 1978 the third Bots album, Wie Zwijgt Stemt Toe (Silence Lends Consent), and is also recorded with Peter Koelewijn. The band's lineup includes Sanders and Bongaerts expanded with sax and flute player Piet Engel, Peter de Vries (bass) and Frans Meijer (drums). The single "Popmuzikant" ("Pop Musician") hit the charts. Together with Eindhoven-based theatre group Proloog, Bots created the musical Barst.

In 1979 Bots worked with Proloog on the Bots Rood Show. This musical theatre production was not very successful. Bots also played in West Germany. They started with Dutch-language songs but soon they are asked to sing in German.

=== 1980s ===
In 1980 Bots recorded the album Je Voelt Pas Nattigheid Als Je Droog Komt Te Staan (You Won't Smell A Rat Until You Come Across One) with producer Peter Koelewijn. In the autumn the band's first German-language album came out. Aufstehn! (Stand Up!) contains German versions of songs like "Zeven Dagen Lang" (de:"Sieben Tage Lang" en:"Seven Days On End") and Ali. The songs were translated by German authors Günter Wallraff, Henning Venske and Peter Tobiasch.

In 1981 Bots sold over 400,000 copies of Aufstehn! and its followup Entrüstung (Indignation, also Ent-Rüstung = Dis-Armament (correctly: en:disarmament = de:Abrüstung) ), which featured the song "Das weiche Wasser (bricht den Stein)" ("Gentle Water Breaks Stone"), as track 04. The antiwar songs were translated from Dutch into German for this album by German author Günter Wallraff, Dieter Hildebrandt, Hanns Dieter Hüsch and Henning Venske. The success also had a downside and there were many changes in the band's lineup. Bots now includes Broer Bogaart (drums) and Noudt Jansen (bass).

In 1981–1982 there was a major dispute within the band and between the band and producers/record companies. Hans Sanders had been holding back money from everyone. Due to these disputes, the band's lineup changed completely. The band has not been supported by a major record company nor recorded a popular hit since.

In 1983 the third German-language Schön Krank (Considerable (slang) Sick) was recorded, with very little success or sales. The band was on the road a lot and played for free in front of half a million people at the Künstler Für Den Frieden (Artists For Peace) festival in West Berlin.

From 1985 until 1988 Sjoerd van Bommel was the band's drummer. In 1986 the German-language record Lass Die Sterne Stehen was released. In 1988 the band played in Germany.

=== 1990s ===
In 1990 the Dutch-language album Paradijs (Paradise) was recorded and released on the Free label in May. The album was produced by Sanders and keyboard player/singer Kees Buenen. Bots sporadically performed in their hometown, Eindhoven.

In 1997, when football team PSV Eindhoven wins the national championships, Sanders re-recorded his classic "Zeven Dagen Lang" and turned it into "Zeven Jaren Lang" ("Seven Years On End"). Former BOTS band members and fans were insulted by the way Sanders rewrote the song and publicly tried to claim Bots' heritage.

=== 2000s ===
In 2001 Bots still tours (drives around) but seldom plays. During the Folkwoods Festival in August the band's lineup included Sanders, Buenen, George Koenraad (drums/vocals), Erik van Donkersgoed (guitar/vocals) and Anton Wannemakers (bass).

In 2007 lead singer Hans Sanders dies. The band is looking for a replacement to sing the rest of the numbers written for the new album.

== Line-up ==
- Bonkie Bongaerts : guitar, piano, vocals
- Frans Meijer : drums, bongos
- Hans Sanders : guitar, vocals
- Kees Buenen; guitar, piano, vocals
- Noudt Janssen; bass guitar, vocals
- Peter de Vries : bass guitar
- Piet Engel : flute, saxophone
- Sjors Van De Molengraft : flute, saxophone

== Other musicians ==
- Anton Wannemakers : bass guitar
- Bert Smaak : drums
- Broer Bogaart : drums
- Erik van Donkersgoed : backing vocals, guitar
- Floris Teunissen Van Manen : drums
- George Koenraad : backing vocals, drums
- Sjoerd Van Bommel : drums
