= Axel Coon =

German musician (born 1975)

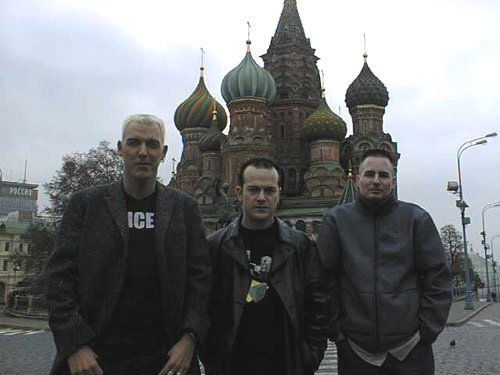
- Coon in Moscow (right), 2000

Background information
- Also known as: Lacoon; Silvo; Nooc; Plaxx
- Born: Axel Broszeit; March 23, 1975 (age 51); Freiburg, Germany
- Genres: Techno; hard trance; dance
- Years active: 1997-pressnt
- Label: Kontor Records
- Formerly of: Scooter; Resident DJs; Bravo All Stars

Axel Broszeit (born March 23, 1975) professionally known as Axel Coon, is a German musician, disc jockey and producer who is most known for being a member of German hard dance group Scooter from 1998 to 2002 as a replacement for Ferris Bueller.

== Early life ==
Coon was born in Freiburg on March 23, 1975. He studied as an industrial-electronic engineer.

== Career ==
Coon began his music career under the influence of his brother, at first he attempted hip hop tracks and ending up teaming up with his brother as they began making techno music.

He released his first track called "Take Two", in 1997 under the stage name of Lacoon, he ended up getting noticed by Jens Thiele (founder of Kontor Records and manager of Scooter), the single was released as the eleventh instalment of Trance Nation compilation album series, Rick J. Jordan invited him to join Scooter for internship in the studio, on New Year's Eve in 1997, he got his chance to perform for Scooter in Bremen as J. Jordan's replacement as he was unavailable. Three months later after Ferris Bueller (Sören Buehler) left the group, he was named the third member of Scooter. He debuted in their first single of the new album No Time to Chill, How Much Is the Fish?, he ended up contributing for four studio albums.

In 2002, he left Scooter after wanting to focus on a solo career. He ended up collaborating with former Scooter member Ferris Bueller under the project name; Fragrance. Then he actively started releasing tracks.

Axel remains active, but never really went popular after leaving Scooter.

== Personal life ==
His brother; Martin Broszeit, also known as DJ Phoenix, is also currently active as a disc jockey.

Axel has been in a long-term relationship with Nicole Heyka (who worked as porn actress name Kelly Trump), as it was revealed in the music video of Ramp! (The Logical Song). According to the TV show "POP Giganten: Scooter" (which was shown in March 2024), Coon's exit from Scooter could be traced back from this relationship, as it would’ve put a bad light on Scooter, so they asked Axel to not publicly disclose it, he ended up leaving on the back-end of 2002.

== Discography ==
This is Coon's discography inside & outside of Scooter

Singles
Title	Album	Year released
Takes Two	Trance Nation 11	1997
Back In Time	Trance Nation 12	1997
3rd Bass	Trance Nation 13	1997
Static	Trance Nation 14	1998
How Much Is the Fish?	No Time to Chill	1998
We Are the Greatest/ I Was Made for Lovin' You	No Time to Chill	1998
Call Me Mañana	No Time to Chill	1999
Faster Harder Scooter	Back to the Heavyweight Jam	1999
Fuck the Millennium	Back to the Heavyweight Jam	1999
I'm Your Pusher	Sheffield	2000
She's the Sun	Sheffield	2000
Posse (I Need You on the Floor)	We Bring the Noise!	2001
Aiii Shot the DJ	We Bring the Noise!	2001
Ramp! (The Logical Song)	Push the Beat for This Jam	2001
Close to You	Non album single	2002
Don't Break My Heart (with Ferris)	Non album single	2002
Lamenting City	Non album single	2004
Mayday	Non album single	2007
Promise Me	Non album single	2008
Drop The Bass (with Sequenza)	Non album single	2015
We Are Young	Non album single	2016

Albums
Title	Year released
No Time to Chill	1998
Back to the Heavyweight Jam	1999
Sheffield	2000
We Bring the Noise!	2001
Fashion Victims	2009
Fashion Victims Vol 2	2010
Fashion Victims Vol 3	2012
After Work Party	2012
Electro Clash	2013
Urban HipHopMachine	2013
Retro Machine	2014
Fashion Victims Vol 4	2014
German Paparazzo	2014
TV Tension	2014
Fashion Victims Vol 5 (Trap Edition)	2015
GoodDay Sunshine	2015
Merry X-Mas	2015
Boombox	2015
Symphonic Surroundings	2017
Decent Illustration	2017
