= Push the Beat for This Jam (The Second Chapter) =

Compilation album by Scooter
- Released: 7 January 2002
- Recorded: 1998–2002
- Studio: Loop Dance Constructions Studios (Hamburg, Germany)
- Genre: Hardcore techno; trance
- Length: 147:51
- Label: Sheffield Tunes
- Producer: Scooter

Scooter chronology
We Bring the Noise! (2001)	Push the Beat for This Jam (The Second Chapter) (2002)	Encore: Live and Direct (2002)

Singles from Push the Beat for This Jam (The Second Chapter)
- 1. "Ramp! (The Logical Song)" Released: 10 December 2001

Push the Beat for This Jam (The Second Chapter), alternatively titled Push the Beat for This Jam (The Singles '98–'02) in the UK and Australia and Pushing the Beat (The Best of Scooter) in the US, is the second singles compilation from the German techno band Scooter, released on 7 January 2002. It collects all the singles from 1998 to 2002 including the hit single "Ramp! (The Logical Song)" plus three new tracks "Habanera", "No Pain, No Gain", "Loud and Clear", some live tracks, B-sides and remixes. The title is a lyric from the single "Call Me Mañana". The song "Habanera" was also scheduled to be released as a single but there is only a promo release as it was dropped in favour of a new song, "Nessaja".

== Track listing ==
=== International version ===
Original release Disc 1
No.	Title	Writer(s)	Length
1.	"Ramp! (The Logical Song)"	Rick Davies, Roger Hodgson	3:55
2.	"Aiii Shot the DJ"	H.P. Baxxter, Rick J. Jordan, Axel Coon, Jens Thele	3:31
3.	"Posse (I Need You on the Floor)"	Baxxter, Jordan, Coon, Thele	3:52
4.	"She's the Sun"	Baxxter, Jordan, Coon, Thele	3:47
5.	"I'm Your Pusher"	Baxxter, Jordan, Coon, Thele, Allan Gray, Walter Reisch	4:01
6.	"Fuck the Millennium"	Baxxter, Jordan, Coon, Thele, Norman Petty, Richard Stephens, Jimmy Torres	4:14
7.	"Faster Harder Scooter"	Baxxter, Jordan, Coon, Thele	3:47
8.	"Call Me Mañana"	Baxxter, Jordan, Coon, Thele	3:49
9.	"We Are the Greatest"	Baxxter, Jordan, Coon, Thele	3:29
10.	"I Was Made for Lovin' You"	Paul Stanley, Desmond Child, Vini Poncia	3:33
11.	"How Much Is the Fish?"	Baxxter, Jordan, Coon, Thele	3:48
12.	"Sputnik"	Baxxter, Jordan, Coon, Thele	3:08
13.	"Greatest Beats"	Baxxter, Jordan, Coon, Thele	3:07
14.	"Bramfeld"	Baxxter, Jordan, Coon, Thele	5:21
15.	"Monolake"	Baxxter, Jordan, Coon, Thele	4:30
16.	"New Years Day"	Baxxter, Jordan, Coon, Thele	6:41
17.	"Firth of Forth"	Baxxter, Jordan, Coon, Thele	3:42
18.	"Sunrise (Ratty's Inferno)"	Baxxter, Jordan, Coon, Thele	5:41
19.	"Siberia"	Baxxter, Jordan, Coon, Thele	2:53
Total length:			76:51

Disc 2
No.	Title	Writer(s)	Length
1.	"Habanera" (Big Room Mix)	Baxxter, Jordan, Coon, Thele	6:02
2.	"No Pain, No Gain"	Baxxter, Jordan, Coon, Thele	5:54
3.	"Loud and Clear"	Baxxter, Jordan, Coon, Thele	4:18
4.	"Am Fenster"	Emil Bogdanow, Georgi Gogow, Fritz Puppel, Klaus Selmke, Hildegard Maria Rauchfuß	4:18
5.	"Ramp! (The Logical Song)" (The Original Club Mix)	Davies, Hodgson	7:27
6.	"I'm Your Pusher" (Airscape Mix)	Baxxter, Jordan, Coon, Thele, Gray, Reisch	7:59
7.	"Faster Harder Scooter" (Signum Remix)	Baxxter, Jordan, Coon, Thele	7:44
8.	"Ramp! (The Logical Song)" (Starsplash Mix)	Davies, Hodgson	7:19
9.	"Posse (I Need You on the Floor)" (live)	Baxxter, Jordan, Coon, Thele	4:13
10.	"Faster Harder Scooter" (live)	Baxxter, Jordan, Coon, Thele	3:50
11.	"Aiii Shot the DJ" (live)	Baxxter, Jordan, Coon, Thele	3:32
12.	"Call Me Mañana" (live)	Baxxter, Jordan, Coon, Thele	3:42
13.	"How Much is the Fish?" (live)	Baxxter, Jordan, Coon, Thele	4:42
Total length:			71:00

=== UK version ===
To capitalise on the success of "The Logical Song" in the UK, a different version of the album was released there titled Push the Beat for This Jam (The Singles '94–'02). Released on 29 July 2002, it was certified Gold by the BPI on 23 August 2002, reaching a high of number six on the UK Albums Chart. The album contains singles spanning the group's whole career up to that point, with the following track listing.

1. "Hyper Hyper"
2. "Move Your Ass!"
3. "Friends"
4. "Endless Summer"
5. "Back in the U.K."
6. "Let Me be Your Valentine"
7. "Rebel Yell"
8. "I'm Raving"
9. "How Much is the Fish?"
10. "Fire"
11. "The Age of Love"
12. "No Fate"
13. "The Logical Song"
14. "Posse (I Need You on the Floor)"
15. "Call Me Mañana"
16. "Fuck the Millennium"
17. "Aiii Shot the DJ"
18. "Faster Harder Scooter"
19. "Nessaja"

=== US version ===
In the United States, a version titled Pushing the Beat (The Best of Scooter) was released on 17 September 2002, with the following track listing.

1. "Nessaja"
2. "Aiii Shot the DJ"
3. "Posse (I Need You on the Floor)"
4. "I'm Your Pusher"
5. "Fuck the Millennium"
6. "Faster Harder Scooter"
7. "Call Me Mañana"
8. "We are the Greatest"
9. "How Much is the Fish?"
10. "Greatest Beats"
11. "New Year's Day"
12. "Sunrise (Ratty's Inferno)"
13. "Habanera - Big Room Mix"
14. "No Pain, No Gain"
15. "Loud and Clear"
16. "Monolake"
17. "Firth of Forth"
18. "Ramp! (The Logical Song)"

== Charts ==
=== Weekly charts ===
Weekly chart performance for Push the Beat for This Jam (The Second Chapter)
Chart (2002)	Peak position
Australian Albums (ARIA)	39
Austrian Albums (Ö3 Austria)	10
Finnish Albums (Suomen virallinen lista)	29
German Albums (Offizielle Top 100)	5
Hungarian Albums (MAHASZ)	10
Norwegian Albums (VG-lista)	1
Scottish Albums (Official Charts)	3
Swedish Albums (Sverigetopplistan)	2
Swiss Albums (Schweizer Hitparade)	42
UK Albums (Official Charts)	6
UK Independent Albums (Official Charts)	1

=== Year-end charts ===
Year-end chart performance for Push the Beat for This Jam (The Second Chapter)
Chart (2002)	Position
German Albums (Offizielle Top 100)	63
Swedish Albums (Sverigetopplistan)	73
UK Albums (OCC)	100

== Certifications ==
Certifications for Push the Beat for This Jam (The Second Chapter)
Region	Certification	Certified units/sales
Norway (IFPI Norway)	Gold	25,000^{*}
Sweden (GLF)	Gold	30,000^{^}
United Kingdom (BPI)	Gold	100,000^{^}
^{*} Sales figures based on certification alone.^{^} Shipments figures based on certification alone.
