= 24 Carat Gold (album) =

Compilation album by Scooter
- Released: 4 November 2002
- Recorded: 1994–2002
- Studio: The Ambience Studio (Hanover, Germany, 1994–1995); Loop Dance Constructions Studios (Hamburg, Germany, 1995–2002)
- Genre: Eurodance
- Length: 78:49
- Label: Sheffield Tunes
- Producer: Scooter

Scooter chronology
Encore: Live and Direct (2002)	24 Carat Gold (2002)	The Stadium Techno Experience (2003)

24 Carat Gold is a best-of album by German techno group Scooter, featuring 24 gold-selling songs from 1994 until its release date on 4 November 2002. Many of the songs on the album are digitally remastered versions, with some of the songs being shortened as to fit all of the tracks on the album. The album's track list is chronologically backwards in the sense that "Nessaja" was the latest single release while "Hyper Hyper" was their first commercially successful single to be released.

== Track listing ==
Original release
No.	Title	Writer(s)	Length
1.	"Nessaja"	Peter Maffay, Rolf Zuckowski	3:30
2.	"Ramp! (The Logical Song)"	Rick Davies, Roger Hodgson	3:55
3.	"Aiii Shot the DJ"	H.P. Baxxter, Rick J. Jordan, Axel Coon, Jens Thele	3:08
4.	"Posse (I Need You on the Floor)"	Baxxter, Jordan, Coon, Thele	3:31
5.	"She's the Sun"	Baxxter, Jordan, Coon, Thele	3:11
6.	"I'm Your Pusher"	Baxxter, Jordan, Coon, Thele, Allan Gray, Walter Reisch	3:13
7.	"Fuck the Millennium"	Baxxter, Jordan, Coon, Thele, Norman Petty, Richard Stephens, Jimmy Torres	3:27
8.	"Faster Harder Scooter"	Baxxter, Jordan, Coon, Thele	3:22
9.	"Call Me Mañana"	Baxxter, Jordan, Coon, Thele	3:21
10.	"I Was Made for Lovin' You"	Paul Stanley, Desmond Child, Vini Poncia	2:22
11.	"We Are the Greatest"	Baxxter, Jordan, Coon, Thele	3:14
12.	"How Much Is the Fish?"	Baxxter, Jordan, Coon, Thele	3:47
13.	"No Fate"	Steffen Britzke, Matthias Hoffmann, René Swain, Baxxter, Jordan, Ferris Bueller, Thele	3:09
14.	"The Age of Love"	Baxxter, Jordan, Bueller, Thele	2:38
15.	"Fire"	Baxxter, Jordan, Bueller, Thele	3:03
16.	"Break It Up"	Nosie Katzmann	3:26
17.	"I'm Raving"	Marc Cohn	3:10
18.	"Rebel Yell"	Billy Idol, Steve Stevens	3:25
19.	"Let Me Be Your Valentine"	Baxxter, Jordan, Bueller, Thele	3:19
20.	"Back in the U.K."	Baxxter, Jordan, Bueller, Thele	3:04
21.	"Endless Summer"	Baxxter, Jordan, Bueller, Thele	3:14
22.	"Friends"	Baxxter, Jordan, Bueller, Thele	3:11
23.	"Move Your Ass!"	Baxxter, Jordan, Bueller, Thele	3:38
24.	"Hyper Hyper"	Baxxter, Jordan, Bueller, Thele	3:30
Total length:			78:49

== Charts ==
Chart (2002–2003)	Peak position
French Albums (SNEP)	46
German Albums (Offizielle Top 100)	49
Hungarian Albums (MAHASZ)	17
Swiss Albums (Schweizer Hitparade)	94
