= Encore: Live and Direct =

2002 live album by Scooter

Live album by Scooter
- Released: 13 May 2002
- Recorded: 21 January 2002; Cologne, Germany
- Studio: NHB-Studios, Hamburg
- Genre: Eurodance
- Length: 75:52
- Label: Sheffield Tunes
- Producer: Scooter

Scooter chronology
Push the Beat for This Jam (The Second Chapter) (2002)	Encore: Live and Direct (2002)	24 Carat Gold (2002)

Singles from Encore: Live and Direct
- 1. "Nessaja" Released: 8 April 2002

Encore: The Whole Story

Video by Scooter
- Released: 13 May 2002
- Recorded: 21 January 2002; Cologne, Germany
- Studio: NHB-Studios, Hamburg
- Genre: Eurodance, trance
- Length: 103:00 (DVD1: Live in Concert)
- Label: Sheffield Tunes
- Director: Paul Hauptmann
- Producer: Paul Hauptmann

Scooter video chronology
Rough and Tough and Dangerous – The Singles 94/98 (1998)	Encore: The Whole Story (2002)	Excess All Areas (2006)

Encore: Live and Direct and Encore: The Whole Story is a live album and a video release by German hard dance group Scooter released on 13 May 2002 chronicling the show of the band's Push the Beat for This Jam Tour which was held on 21 January 2002 in Cologne (Germany). The film was directed and produced by Paul Hauptmann.

== Track listing ==
=== CD ===
1. "Posse (I Need You on the Floor)" – 5:03
2. "We Bring the Noise" – 3:59
3. "R U ☺?" – 5:25
4. "Aiii Shot the DJ" – 3:27
5. "Faster Harder Scooter" – 3:56
6. "I'm Raving" – 4:04
7. "Call Me Mañana" – 4:20
8. "Fuck the Millennium" – 4:09
9. "Am Fenster" – 6:01
10. "Eyes Without a Face" – 3:44
11. "No Fate" – 4:12
12. "How Much Is the Fish?" – 6:52
13. "The Logical Song" – 4:45
14. "The Age of Love" – 3:06
15. "Fire" – 3:14
16. "Endless Summer" – 3:23
17. "Hyper Hyper" – 2:37
18. "Nessaja" – 3:28 (special bonus track – studio version)

=== DVD ===
==== DVD1: Live in Concert ====
1. "Posse (I Need You on the Floor)"
2. "We Bring the Noise"
3. "R U ☺?"
4. "Aiii Shot the DJ"
5. "Faster Harder Scooter"
6. "I'm Raving"
7. "Rhapsody in E"
8. "Stuttgart"
9. "Call Me Mañana"
10. "Fuck the Millennium"
11. "Habanera"
12. "Am Fenster"
13. "Eyes Without a Face"
14. "No Fate"
15. "How Much is the Fish?"
16. "The Logical Song"
17. "The Age of Love"
18. "Fire"
19. "Endless Summer"
20. "Hyper Hyper"
21. "Move Your Ass!"

Extras:

- Alternate angles on selected live tracks
- Tour and backstage documentary
- Band's comments on live tracks

==== DVD2: The Videos ====
1. "Hyper Hyper"
2. "Move Your Ass!"
3. "Friends"
4. "Endless Summer"
5. "Back in the U.K."
6. "Let Me Be Your Valentine"
7. "Rebel Yell"
8. "I'm Raving"
9. "Break It Up"
10. "Fire"
11. "The Age of Love"
12. "No Fate"
13. "How Much is the Fish?"
14. "We Are the Greatest"
15. "I Was Made for Loving You"
16. "Call Me Mañana"
17. "Faster Harder Scooter"
18. "Fuck the Millennium"
19. "I'm Your Pusher"
20. "She's the Sun"
21. "Posse (I Need You on the Floor)"
22. "Aiii Shot the DJ"
23. "The Logical Song"
24. "Nessaja"

Extras:

- Making ofs
- Discography
- Photo gallery
- Quiz

== Personnel ==
Credits adapted from Encore: The Whole Story liner notes.

- H.P. Baxxter – vocals, MC lyrics, electric guitar, acoustic guitar, producer, performer, programmer
- Rick J. Jordan – keyboards, acoustic guitar, mixer, engineer, producer, performer, programmer
- Axel Coon – keyboards, producer, performer, programmer
- Nicole Sukar – additional vocals on "Nessaja"
- Wenke Kleine-Benne – mixer, engineer

== Charts ==
Chart (2002)	Peak position
Austrian Albums (Ö3 Austria)	25
French Albums (SNEP)	62
German Albums (Offizielle Top 100)	13
Hungarian Albums (MAHASZ)	12
Irish Albums (IRMA)	28
Dutch Albums (Album Top 100)	99
Norwegian Albums (VG-lista)	6
Swedish Albums (Sverigetopplistan)	53
Swiss Albums (Schweizer Hitparade)	71

== Certifications ==
Region	Certification	Certified units/sales
Norway (IFPI Norway)	Gold	25,000^{*}
^{*} Sales figures based on certification alone.
