= Open Your Mind and Your Trousers =

Studio album by Scooter
- Released: 22 March 2024
- Recorded: 2022–23
- Studio: Sheffield Underground (Hamburg, Germany)
- Length: 42:27
- Label: Sheffield Tunes; Kontor; Virgin
- Producer: Scooter; Merlin; Benzsoul; Mike Hawkins; Toby Green; Timmy Trumpet

Scooter chronology
| God Save the Rave (2021) | Open Your Mind and Your Trousers (2024) |

Singles from Open Your Mind and Your Trousers
- 1. "Waste Your Youth" Released: 13 January 2023; 2. "Techno Is Back" Released: 14 April 2023; 3. "Constellations" Released: 23 June 2023; 4. "For Those About to Rave" Released: 21 July 2023; 5. "Berliner Luft" Released: 15 September 2023; 6. "Rave & Shout" Released: 1 December 2023; 7. "I Keep Hearing Bingo" Released: 9 February 2024; 8. "Let's Do It Again" Released: 1 March 2024; 9. "Posse Reloaded" Released: 22 March 2024

Professional ratings
Review scores
| Source | Rating |
|---|---|
| laut.de | 3/5 stars |
| Musikexpress | 1/6 stars |

Open Your Mind and Your Trousers is the 21st studio album by German band Scooter. It was released on 22 March 2024 through Sheffield Tunes, Kontor Records and Virgin Records. This is the first album to feature Marc Blou, who joined the group in 2022, replacing previous member Sebastian Schilde, and the first without Michael Simon, who was with the band from 2006 to 2022. This album also marks the return of Jay Frog, who was previously with the band from 2002 to 2006, then rejoined in 2022. It's his first album with the band since Who's Got the Last Laugh Now? in 2005.

== Track listing ==
| No. | Title | Writer(s) | Producer(s) | Length |
|---|---|---|---|---|
| 1. | "Thirty, Rough and Dirty" | H. P. Baxxter; Marc Blou; Jay Frog; Jens Thele | Scooter | 1:45 |
| 2. | "Rave & Shout" (with Harris & Ford) | Baxxter; Blou; Frog; Thele; Patrick Pöhl; Kevin Kridlo; Donna Lugassy; Rachel Velberg | Scooter | 3:00 |
| 3. | "Posse Reloaded" (with Finch) | Baxxter; Rick J. Jordan; Axel Coon; Thele; Johan van Beek; Robert Mahu; Jasper Drexhage; Guido Pernet; Larenzo Nash | Scooter | 2:33 |
| 4. | "Techno Is Back" (with Harris & Ford) | Baxxter; Blou; Frog; Thele; P. Pöhl; Kridlo; Lugassy; Velberg; Emil Dietrich | Scooter | 2:56 |
| 5. | "I Keep Hearing Bingo" | Baxxter; Blou; Thele; Matthias Uhle; Alexander Kaiser | Scooter | 2:25 |
| 6. | "Children of the Rave" | Baxxter; Blou; Frog; Thele; André Appel; Morten Juhl; Velberg; Lugassy; Sebastian Moser | Scooter | 2:27 |
| 7. | "Let's Do It Again" | Baxxter; Blou; Frog; Thele | Scooter | 2:11 |
| 8. | "Waste Your Youth" | Baxxter; Blou; Frog; Thele; Maximillian Bohnet; Mary Jensen; Peter Stephan Brugger; Rüdiger Linhof; Florian Weber | Scooter; Merlin^{[a]}; Benzsoul^{[a]} | 2:44 |
| 9. | "Sun Comes Back Around" | Baxxter; Blou; Thele; Christin Pohl; Loris Cimino; Riehl | Scooter; Merlin^{[a]}; Benzsoul^{[a]} | 2:33 |
| 10. | "For Those About to Rave" (with Timmy Trumpet) | Timothy Jude Smith; Mikkel Cox; Tobias Frederiksen; Baxxter; Blou; Frog; Thele; Marcel Neumann | Mike Hawkins; Toby Green; Timmy Trumpet^{[b]}; Scooter^{[b]} | 2:42 |
| 11. | "ARDRHU" | Baxxter; Blou; Leander Benz; Merlin Janowsky; Thele | Scooter; Merlin^{[a]}; Benzsoul^{[a]} | 3:53 |
| 12. | "Berliner Luft" | Baxxter; Blou; Frog; Thele | Scooter | 2:46 |
| 13. | "Ten Feet" | Baxxter; Thele; Blou; Frog; Sebastian Schilde; Simon Adrian; Riehl; C. Pohl | Scooter | 3:06 |
| 14. | "Constellations" | Baxxter; Thele; Blou; Frog; Andreas Josef Huber; Jan Hammele; Lina Hansson | Scooter | 2:56 |
| 15. | "Avoid Rivals" | Baxxter; Blou; Frog; Thele | Scooter | 4:25 |

=== Notes ===
- ^a signifies a co-producer
- ^b signifies an additional producer
- "Posse Reloaded" is a re-recorded version of Scooter's track "Posse (I Need You on the Floor)" from the album We Bring the Noise!
- "I Keep Hearing Bingo" contains elements of "A Neverending Dream" by X-Perience.
- "Waste Your Youth" contains elements of "Ein Kompliment" by Sportfreunde Stiller.
- "Berliner Luft" contains elements of "Berliner Luft", written by Paul Lincke.

== Charts ==
Chart performance for Open Your Mind and Your Trousers
| Chart (2024) | Peak position |
|---|---|
| Austrian Albums (Ö3 Austria) | 4 |
| German Albums (Offizielle Top 100) | 2 |
| Hungarian Physical Albums (MAHASZ) | 35 |
| Swiss Albums (Schweizer Hitparade) | 8 |
| UK Dance Albums (OCC) | 2 |
