= Excess All Areas (Scooter album) =

2006 live album by Scooter

Live album by Scooter
- Released: 2 June 2006
- Recorded: 26 March 2006
- Venue: Alsterdorfer Sporthalle, Hamburg, Germany
- Studio: NHB-Studios, Hamburg
- Genre: Eurodance, trance
- Length: 72:32
- Label: Sheffield Tunes
- Producer: Scooter

Scooter chronology
| Who's Got the Last Laugh Now? (2005) | Excess All Areas (2006) | The Ultimate Aural Orgasm (2007) |

Excess All Areas

Video by Scooter
- Released: 2 June 2006
- Recorded: 26 March 2006
- Venue: Alsterdorfer Sporthalle, Hamburg, Germany
- Studio: NHB-Studios, Hamburg
- Genre: Eurodance, trance
- Length: 92:00 (DVD1: Live In Concert)
- Label: Sheffield Tunes
- Director: Tim Tibor / Andreas Bardét
- Producer: Florian Arlart

Scooter video chronology
| Encore: The Whole Story (2002) | Excess All Areas (2006) | Live in Hamburg (2010) |

Excess All Areas is a live album and a video release by German hard dance group Scooter released on 2 June 2006 chronicling the final show of the band's Who's Got the Last Laugh Now? Tour which was held on 26 March 2006 at Alsterdorfer Sporthalle (Hamburg, Germany). The concert film was directed by Tim Tibor and Andreas Bardét, who previously directed a music video for One (Always Hardcore).

== Track listing ==
=== CD / Web ===
1. "Intro" – 2:40
2. "Hello! (Good to be Back)" – 3:46
3. "I'm Raving" – 4:39
4. "Apache Rocks the Bottom!" – 4:49
5. "The Leading Horse" – 3:20
6. "Shake That!" – 4:13
7. "Panties Wanted" – 5:07
8. "Weekend!" – 3:34
9. "Stripped" – 4:21
10. "Maria (I Like It Loud)" – 4:48
11. "The Chaser / Jigga Jigga!" – 6:39
12. "Nessaja" – 3:41
13. "One (Always Hardcore)" – 5:15
14. "Fire" – 4:16
15. "Hyper Hyper" – 5:53
16. "Move Your Ass!" – 5:33

=== DVD ===
==== DVD1: Live In Concert ====
1. "Intro" – 2:56
2. "Hello! (Good to be Back)" – 4:16
3. "I'm Raving" – 4:05
4. "Apache Rocks the Bottom!" – 5:17
5. "The Leading Horse" – 4:39
6. "Shake That!" – 4:09
7. "Panties Wanted" – 5:17
8. "Weekend!" – 4:16
9. "Stripped" – 4:20
10. "Maria (I Like It Loud)" – 4:46
11. "The Chaser / Jigga Jigga!" – 7:21
12. "Faster Harder Scooter" – 4:49
13. "Nessaja" – 3:43
14. "One (Always Hardcore)" – 5:37
15. "Fire" – 7:23
16. "How Much is the Fish?" – 4:55
17. "Hyper Hyper" – 5:45
18. "Move Your Ass" – 8:21

Extras:

- Backstage report
- On stage perspective on selected tracks
- Fan interviews
- Tour diary

==== DVD2: The Videos ====
1. "Apache Rocks the Bottom!" – 3:47
2. "Hello! (Good to be Back)" – 3:33
3. "Suavemente" – 3:40
4. "One (Always Hardcore)" – 3:55
5. "Shake That!" – 3:24
6. "Jigga Jigga!" – 3:59
7. "Maria (I Like It Loud)" – 3:42
8. "The Night" – 3:41
9. "Weekend!" – 3:36
10. "Nessaja" – 3:29
11. "The Logical Song" – 3:58
12. "Aiii Shot the DJ" – 3:31
13. "Posse (I Need You on the Floor)" – 3:45
14. "She's the Sun" – 4:01
15. "I'm Your Pusher" – 3:50
16. "Fuck the Millennium" – 4:12
17. "Faster Harder Scooter" – 3:43
18. "Call Me Mañana" – 3:31
19. "I Was Made for Lovin' You" – 3:32
20. "We are the Greatest" – 3:28
21. "How Much is the Fish?" – 3:46
22. "No Fate" – 3:42
23. "The Age of Love" – 4:06
24. "Fire" – 3:31
25. "Break It Up" – 3:38
26. "I'm Raving" – 3:35
27. "Rebel Yell" – 3:44
28. "Let Me be Your Valentine" – 3:48
29. "Back in the U.K." – 3:24
30. "Endless Summer" – 3:26
31. "Friends" – 3:36
32. "Move Your Ass!" – 3:30
33. "Hyper Hyper" – 3:35
34. "One (Always Hardcore)" (Rick J Jordan's Director's Cut) – 3:52

Extras:

- Band commentary on all videos
- Making offs

== Credits and personnel ==
Credits adapted from Excess All Areas liner notes.

- H.P. Baxxter – vocals, MC lyrics, producer, performer, programmer
- Rick J. Jordan – keyboards, drums, mixer, engineer, producer, performer, programmer
- Jay Frog – keyboards, drums, producer, performer, programmer
- Jeff "Mantas" Dunn – electric guitar
- Louis C. Oberlander – mixer, engineer
- Jens Thele – management

== Charts (Live album) ==
| Chart (2006) | Peak position |
|---|---|
| Austrian Albums (Ö3 Austria) | 64 |
| German Albums (Offizielle Top 100) | 29 |
