= 24 Carat Gold =

24 Carat Gold or 24 Karat Gold may refer to:

- Karat, a measure of the purity of gold
- 24 Carat Gold (album), by Scooter, 2002
- 24 Karat Gold: Songs from the Vault, an album by Stevie Nicks, 2014
  - "24 Karat Gold" (song), the title song
  - 24 Karat Gold Tour, a 2016–17 concert tour
