= Phil Speiser =

Austrian musician (born 1990)

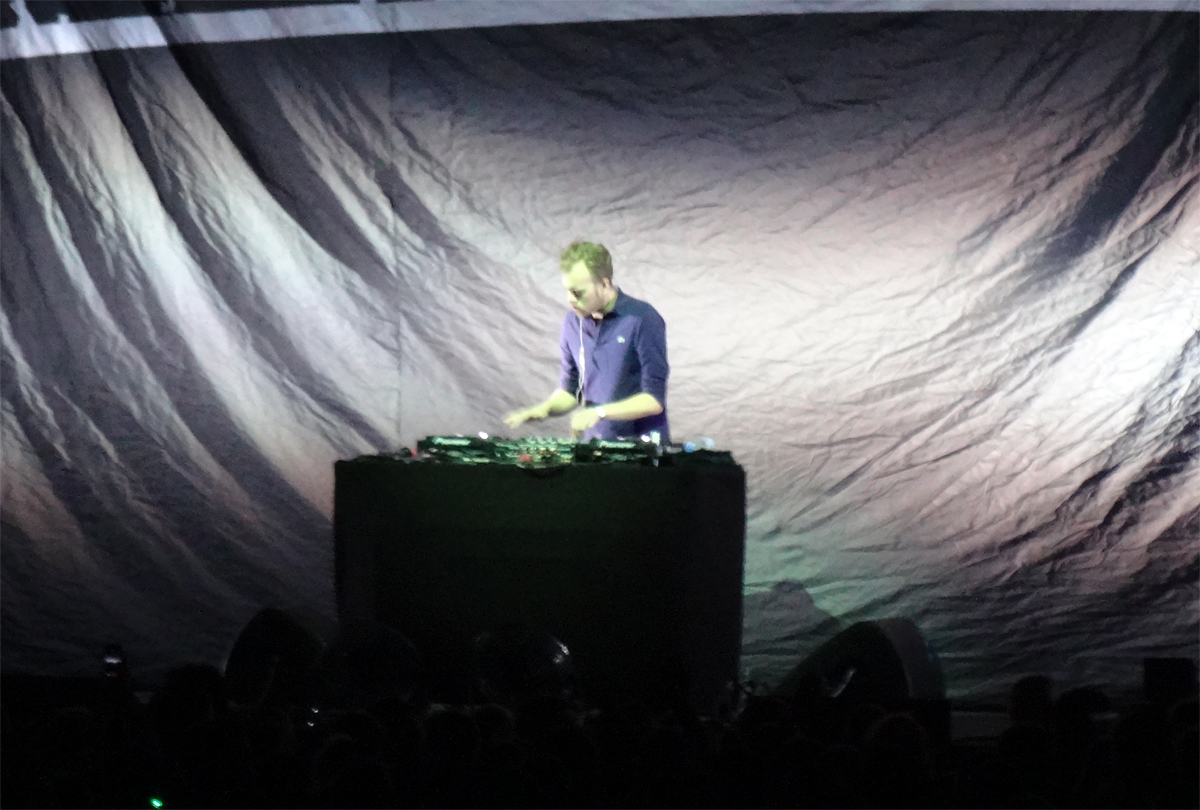
- Speiser in 2014

Background information
- Also known as: Dirty Disco Youth
- Born: Philipp Speiser; October 12, 1990 (age 36); Vienna, Austria
- Instruments: Electric guitar, keyboard, synthesizer
- Years active: 2005-present
- Labels: Kontor Records; Spinnin’ Records; Dim Mak; Onelove; Oh! My God Its Techno Music
- Formerly of: Scooter
- Website: www.philspeiser.com

Philipp Speiser (born 12 October 1990) professionally known as Dirty Disco Youth or DDY is an Austrian disc jockey, keyboardist and producer who is well known for his works with Scooter from 2014 to 2018 after replacing long term veteran Rick J. Jordan after 20 years.

== Early life ==
Speiser was born in Vienna in 1990, he started his music career at 15 under the stage name "Dirty Disco Youth" and gained attention from various famous disc jockeys

== Career ==
=== Scooter ===
After Rick J. Jordan announced he was leaving Scooter after "20 fantastic hardcore years" to focus on family life, he was contacted to replace Rick. His first release with Scooter being Bigroom Blitz with Wiz Khalifa with their brand new album release The Fifth Chapter, made a statement for their new era of the band. The next song was called Today, which was release swiftly after Bigroom Blitz. However, the relationships with the band members H.P. Baxxter and Michael Simon were not in fact new, that same year on his arrival Scooter, as prior they had released a song under the alias of "Baxxter, Simon and DDY" with "Sweater Weather". Scooter then released Ace in 2015, which was his first out of two album. In 2017, Scooter released Bora! Bora! Bora!, which was the first single out of their newest album Scooter Forever. After the 25 Years Wild & Wicked Tour, Speiser announced he would leave Scooter after 4 years due to wanting to focus on a solo career. Rumours were spread about Speiser actually being kicked out of Scooter, due to Michael Simon claiming H.P. had in fact revealed to him that members had ''four-year contracts'' at the band.

== Personal life ==
Speiser plays the electric guitar, as shown in performances of Riot.

== Discography ==
This is Speiser's discography outside Scooter

=== Singles ===
- Dirty Disco Youth – Bleep (EP) (2008)
- Dirty Disco Youth – The Kids Want Maximal (2008)
- Dirty Disco Youth – Shuffle (2009)
- Dirty Disco Youth – Stupid Sound (2009)
- Dirty Disco Youth – Idiotekk (feat. Chokr) (2009)
- Dirty Disco Youth – Yo Yo Yo Yo (2009)
- Dirty Disco Youth – Don't Let Go (2009)
- Dirty Disco Youth – Love (2010)
- Dirty Disco Youth – ...Off (EP) (2010)
- NiTE – Overdose (2011)
- Dirty Disco Youth & Duo Synchron – Gravity (2011)
- Dirty Disco Youth – Drive (EP) (2012)
- Dirty Disco Youth – Three Oh Three (2012)
- Sharam Jey & Dirty Disco Youth – Up Rock! (2012)
- Blatta & Ineshaand Dirty Disco Youth – Texas Techno (2012)
- Sharam Jey & Dirty Disco Youth – Till We Drop (2012)
- Fukkk Offf & Dirty Disco Youth – Nuclear War / Bomb Disaster (2012)
- Dirty Disco Youth – Kids (2013)
- Dirty Disco Youth – Black Diamond (2013)
- Dirty Disco Youth – Singapore (2013)
- Dirty Disco Youth – The Bell (2014)
- Dirty Disco Youth – Harmonize (2014)
- Orange Grove & SPYZR – Easy Love (2015)
- SPYZR feat. Michael Maidwell – Ready For It (2015)
- Lotus, Salt-N-Pepa, SPYZR – Push It! (2016)
- VVAVES – 5 Of Your Exes (2020)
- Ms Banks x Phil Speiser x WOW Jones – Nothin' On Me (2020)

=== Remixes ===
- Outlander – The Vamp (2008)
- Nonewyork – No Love (2009)
- Scanners – Salvation (2009)
- Sharam Jey – Army of Men (2010)
- A.G. Trio – Things You Wanna Play (2010)
- Kids At The Bar – Your Body and Me (2010)
- Stereofunk – Italomatique (2010)
- Team Symmetry – Batoru Rowaiaru (2010)
- Sono – What You Do (2010)
- Sharam Jey – Hearts of Stone (2010)
- Sovnger – Breathless (2010)
- Robyn – Dancing On My Own (2010)
- Etienne De Crecy – Binary (2010)
- Frauenarzt – Atzin (2010)
- Sharam Jey – Hearts of Stone (2010)
- Ero – Submerged (2010)
- Fukkk Offf – Famous (2010)
- Teenage Mutants – Le Champ (2010)
- So Called Friend – Hands (2010)
- Debra Dolce – Goodies (2010)
- Schluck Den Druck – Partynarben (2010)
- Futureflash – Find Your Brother (2010)
- Fukkk Offf – Worldwide (2010)
- Leopold Gregori – Pigeon Dance (2010)
- Gigi Barocco & Jane Bang – Crunk It (2011)
- Spencer & Hill – 2 Kisses For You (2011)
- Sick Boy – Bang Your Head (2011)
- Azzido Da Bass – Music For Bagpipes (2011)
- Dare2Disco – Revolver (2011)
- Ludovic – Dusty (2011)
- Decalicious – Raboisen Belle (2011)
- Jeuce – As We Move (2012)
- Moonbootica – Iconic (2012)
- Fukkk Offf – 24/7 (2012)
- Drunken Masters – Bang Bang (2012)
- Dirty Disco Youth – Crossroads (Phil Speiser Remix) (2012)
- Big White Dog Lost – Sex (2013)
- Gtronic – Morpheus (2013)
- Das Bo & Hangergang – MMB (2013)
- Sick Boy – Bang Your Head (2013)
- Tigerlily & 2Less – Faith (2014)
- Frederic De Carvalho Feat. CS Rucker – Girl (2014)
- Nonsense – You Say (2015)
- Lost Frequencies – Reality (2015)
- The Underdog Project – Summer Jam (2015)
- Micar – This Time It's My Life (2015)
- Gestört Aber Geil – Ich & Du (2015)
- Stanton Warriors – The One (2015)
- Alexander Brown – Jack In The Box (2015)
- Lotus – Leaning Sideways (2015)
- Dimitri Vegas & Like Mike – Higher Place (2015)
- Stereoact – Der Himmel Reisst Auf (2016)
- Fun Factory – Celebration (2016)

=== Others ===
- Baxxter, Simon and DDY – Sweater Weather (2013)
- Nature One Inc. – Stay As You Are (2015)
- Gestört Aber Geil – Gestört Aber Geil (2016)
