= Hildegard Maria Rauchfuß =

German writer (1918–2000)

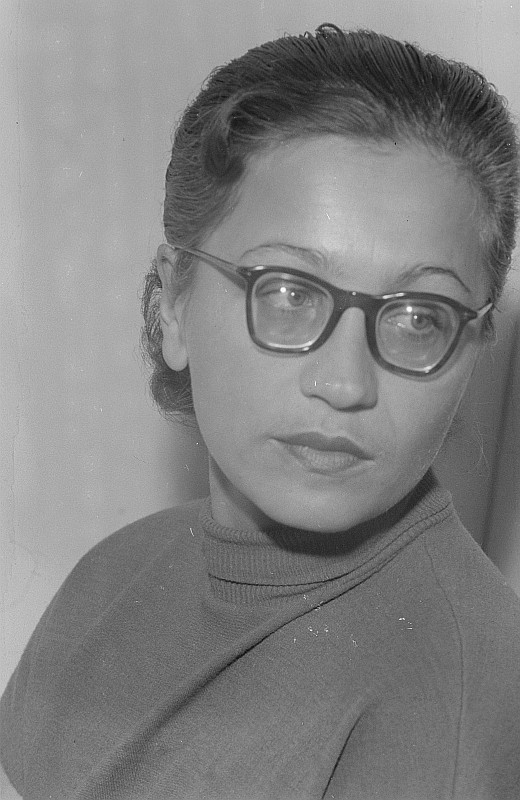
Hildegard Maria Rauchfuß Roger & Renate Rössing 1953

Hildegard Maria Rauchfuß (22 February 1918 - 28 May 2000) was a German writer. Her output included novels, short stories, poems, song/cabaret lyrics, radio plays and television dramas. Many of her books flowed from her own extensive in-person research and tell of women who achieved, or failed to find, emancipation.

== Biography ==
Hildegard Maria Rauchfuß was born in Breslau. Herbert Rauchfuß, her father, was an imperial guards officer who later went into business. It was said that she inherited her style from Clara, her French-born mother, and her discipline from her Prussian father. She left school earlier than intended, and before having the chance to complete the curriculum or take part in the final exams. The National Socialists had taken power early in 1933 and rapidly transformed the country into a one-party dictatorship. Antisemitism was no longer merely a shrill slogan for populist politicians. It had become a core underpinning of government policy: Rauchfuß was excluded from her school because she stood up for school friends identified by the authorities as Jewish. She therefore completed her school studies at a nearby commercially focused school ("Handelsschule") before embarking on a traineeship in singing. During the Second World War, which had broken out in 1939, she combined her musical studies with work in a bank.

With the Soviet army advancing from the east, in 1944 Adolf Hitler, the German leader, declared that Breslau was a strategic "Festung", to be defended at any cost. Hildegard Maria and her parents fled when the civilian population was evacuated on a cold January day a couple of weeks before the Soviet forces arrived. The Rauchfuß family settled initially in Bad Warmbrunn. By 1947 those identified as ethnic Germans had been transported on to Leipzig, where the Rauchfuß family made their home. Despite having been liberated from Nazi control by US forces in April 1945, it had been agreed before the end of the war that the city was to be administered as part of the Soviet occupation zone in post war Germany, and the Soviets had been in control of it since July 1945. Accordingly, it was in the Soviet zone, relaunched in October 1949 as the German Democratic Republic (East Germany), that Hildegard Maria Rauchfuß lived and built her career during the decades that followed.

Her first job after arriving in Leipzig was as a book-keeper. It was Ernst Richard, a legendary senior editor at the Leipziger Zeitung, who spotted her talent as a writer. In 1948 she moved on to work in the literature department at MDR, the main radio broadcaster in the region. Four years later, in 1952, she was dismissed without notice after two of her short stories had been broadcast on the RIAS, a Berlin-based radio station which operated under the "supervision" of the United States Information Agency.

Now working as a freelance writer, she was encouraged by erudite neighbours such as former publisher Wieland Herzfelde (1896-1988), his brother, the polymath visual artist John Heartfield (1891-1968), and the philosopher Ernst Bloch (1985-1977). Increasingly, Rauchfuß draw in her writings on her own experiences. She drove over to Dresden, stood in the middle of all the rubble, spoke with the restoration workers, sat on the remains of ruined buildings, asked questions and listened to the answers. The driving principle, that "you must have touched the stones about which you write", was one to which she would adhere for the rest of her life. Illustrative of this approach was her first novel, Wem die Steine Antwort geben (loosely, "To whom the stones reply"), in which she wrote about the rebuilding of the Dresden Baroque-style Zwinger (palace complex) and the city's postwar context. Published in 1953, this book was her first major public success. After taking time investigating clinics and health spas, in 1954 she published Besiegte Schatten (loosely "Shadows overcome"), in which she portrayed the struggle of doctors and nurses against Tuberculosis. There followed a succession of poems, ballads, television dramas and scripts for the Leipziger Pfeffermühle ("Leipzig Pepper-grinder"), a gently anti-establishment cabaret company.

Schlesisches Himmelreich ("Silesian Heaven"), published in 1968, during the run-up towards a pragmatic and cautious easing of political tensions between East and West Germany, was the first of her novels to achieve success on both sides of the Cold War barrier dividing the two Germanies. Strongly autobiographical, in this 700 page novel ("Bildungsroman") the author recalls the Nazi delusions that destroyed the cohabitative lives of Germans, Poles and Jews, and the ensuing ethnic cleansing. Twelve years later another strongly autobiographical novel, Fische auf Zweigen (literally, "Fish in the branches") dealt with the personal development of a young woman who has grown up in the conservative Silesian middle-class milieu of the 1920s and is coming to terms with the challenges and family tensions presented by life in the Soviet occupation zone and the German Democratic Republic in the later 1940s. Gender and discrimination issues feature particularly strongly in this book.

The last of her novels to achieve significant impact with commentators and readers was Schlußstrich ("Bottom line", or loosely, "And finally"), published in 1986. The book elegantly described how people in the German Democratic Republic would "look the other way" when a comrade succumbed to alcoholism. Basing her narrative on characteristically thorough research Rauchfuß showed how "mass-drugs" ("Massendrogen") such as beer, wine and brandy destroyed individuals and families, leading to the loss of friends and neighbours. The book unleashed a variety of public discussions.

Her manuscript Meine sieben Männer oder Rückseite des Feigenblatte ("My seven men and the backside of the fig leaf") remains unpublished: it forms part of her literary estate which is held by the Leipzig City Library.

Composers who set her lyrics/poems to music included Andre Asriel, Dmitry Kabalevsky and Gerd Natschinski. She also wrote the words for the City (band) 1974 hit Am Fenster ("At the window"). The song became an enduring East German rock classic across and beyond the German speaking world: it also achieved significant success in "distant Greece". Other poems and song lyrics came to prominence through the many recordings made by Gisela May.

Works by Rauchfuß have been translated into Mongolian, Swedish, Russian and Ukrainian.

== Memberships ==
Hildegard Maria Rauchfuß sustained her membership of the East German arts establishment. She was, in 1950, a founder member of the (East) German Writers' Association. In 1975 she also became a member of the (East) German Journalists' Association. She was, in the words of one sympathetic source, a "companionable comrade who could be very direct with contemporaries. She was an excellent and lucid conversationalist who sometimes became positively garrulous". These qualities were also placed at the disposal of the Ministry for State Security (Stasi) between 1967 and 1976. The authorities used her insights for their own purposes. She was identified in their files as an informer under the cover name "Bettina Schreiber" (loosely "Bettina Writer"). She regretted the closeness of her links to the Stasi during this period for the rest of her life.

== Personal ==
Hildegard Maria Rauchfuß was childless and never married. Her life-partner during the final decades of her life, till his death, was the Leipzig literary scholar Robert Zoppek (1919-1998).

== Awards and honours (selection) ==
- 1963 Arts Prize from the City of Leipzig
- 1973 Johannes R. Becher Medal
- 1979 Patriotic Order of Merit
- 1986 National Prize of the German Democratic Republic Class III for literature and the arts

== Output (selection) ==
- Jahrmarkt und andere Erzählungen, Leipzig 1949
- Das schilfgrüne Kleid und andere Erzählungen, Leipzig 1949
- Gewitter überm großen Fluß, Leipzig 1952
- Wem die Steine Antwort geben, Halle (Saale) 1953
- Besiegte Schatten, Halle (Saale) 1954
- Fräulein Rosenzeh und andere Märchen, Berlin 1959
- So anders fällt das Licht, Halle (Saale) 1959
- Die weißen und die schwarzen Lämmer, Halle (Saale) 1959
- Die grünen Straßen, Halle (Saale) 1963
- Schlesisches Himmelreich, Leipzig 1968
- Versuch es mit der kleinen Liebe, Berlin 1970
- Kopfbälle, Leipzig 1974
- War ich zu taktlos, Felix?, Leipzig 1976
- Fische auf den Zweigen, Halle u. a. 1980
- Mit dem linken Fuß zuerst, Halle u. a. 1984
- Schlußstrich, Halle u. a. 1986
- Zwei Gedichte, Leipzig 1998 (together with Volker Pfüller)
