= Sheffield (album) =

Studio album by Scooter
- Released: 20 July 2000
- Recorded: 2000
- Studios: Loop D.C. Studios 1 and 2, Hamburg, Germany
- Length: 46:00
- Labels: Sheffield Tunes, Loop Dance Constructions
- Producers: H.P. Baxxter; Rick J. Jordan; Axel Coon; Jens Thele

Scooter chronology
Back to the Heavyweight Jam (1999)	Sheffield (2000)	We Bring the Noise! (2001)

Singles from Sheffield
- 1. "I'm Your Pusher" Released: 29 May 2000; 2. "She's the Sun" Released: 21 August 2000

Professional ratings
Review scores
Source	Rating
AllMusic	2/5 stars

Sheffield is the seventh studio album by German hard dance band Scooter, released in 2000. It includes two singles: "I'm Your Pusher" and "She's the Sun" .

The album was re-released on LP on 9 December 2022, which was available on black and orange LP, with the orange coloured vinyl being limited to 500 copies.

== Track listing ==
All songs written by H.P. Baxxter, Rick J. Jordan, Axel Coon, and Jens Thele, except "I'm Your Pusher" co-written by Allan Gray and Walter Reisch; "Sex Dwarf" written by David Ball and Marc Almond; and "Summer Wine" written by Lee Hazlewood. All lyrics written by The Screaming Lord.

1. "MC's Missing" – 1:16
2. "Don't Gimme the Funk" – 4:13
3. "I'm Your Pusher" – 3:59
4. "Where Do We Go?" – 4:06
5. "Sex Dwarf" – 4:20
6. "She's the Sun" – 4:54
7. "Space Cowboy" – 5:51
8. "Never Slow Down" – 3:56
9. "Down to the Bone" – 4:11
10. "Summer Wine" – 3:58
11. "Dusty Vinyl" – 4:53
12. "Cubic" – 5:05

Sample credits

- "MC's Missing" uses the sound of Big Ben chiming.
- "I'm Your Pusher" samples the 1932 song "Flieger, grüß' mit mir die Sonne" by Hans Albers and Heinz Rühmann.
- "Sex Dwarf" is a cover of the Soft Cell song, from the 1981 album Non-stop Erotic Cabaret.
- "Summer Wine" is a cover of the 1967 song, originally performed by Nancy Sinatra and Lee Hazlewood.
- "Never Slow Down" is very similar musically to Bomfunk MC's song "Freestyler", taken from the 1999 album In Stereo.
- The drum loop in "She's the Sun" is sampled from the introduction of Led Zeppelin's version of "When the Levee Breaks", taken from the 1971 album Led Zeppelin IV.

== Charts ==
Chart performance for Sheffield
Chart (2000)	Peak position
Austrian Albums (Ö3 Austria)	49
Danish Albums (Hitlisten)	36
Finnish Albums (Suomen virallinen lista)	9
German Albums (Offizielle Top 100)	11
Hungarian Albums (MAHASZ)	2
Swedish Albums (Sverigetopplistan)	15
Swiss Albums (Schweizer Hitparade)	60
