= Nessaja =

1983 single by Peter Maffay

Single by Peter Maffay

from the album Tabaluga oder die Reise zur Vernunft
- Language: German
- B-side: "Tabaluga"
- Released: 1983
- Length: 4:10
- Label: Metronome
- Songwriters: Peter Maffay; Rolf Zuckowski
- Producers: Peter Wagner; Peter Schirmann; Peter Maffay

Audio
- "Nessaja" on YouTube

"Nessaja" is a German-language song written by Peter Maffay and Rolf Zuckowski from the musical Tabaluga. Performed by Maffay, it was included on the 1983 album Tabaluga oder die Reise zur Vernunft and was released as a single the same year, reaching number 17 on the West German Singles Chart. The song has been covered multiple times, including by dance project Once Again, whose version peaked at number 42 in Germany, and by German band Scooter, whose English-language version became their only number-one single in their home country.

== Scooter version ==
"Nessaja"

Single by Scooter

from the album Encore: Live and Direct
- B-side: "Shortbread"
- Released: 8 April 2002
- Length: 3:30
- Label: Sheffield Tunes
- Songwriters: Peter Maffay; Rolf Zuckowski; H. P. Baxxter
- Producer: Scooter

Scooter singles chronology
| "Ramp! (The Logical Song)" (2001) | "Nessaja" (2002) | "Weekend!" (2003) |

In April 2002, Scooter released a version of "Nessaja" with English lyrics. It appears as a bonus track on the group's first live album, Encore: Live and Direct, and was the first Scooter single to feature new member Jay Frog. The pitch shifted female vocals are performed by Nicole "Nikk" Sukar. "Nessaja" became Scooter's first and only number-one single in Germany and reached number two in Austria, Norway, and Romania. In the United Kingdom, the song peaked at number four on the UK Singles Chart.

=== Music video ===
The music video for "Nessaja" opens with a limousine pulling up outside a large white mansion. Women in dresses and men in suits get out of the car and go inside the house. Many people are waiting for a 'show' to start behind a red curtain. When the music starts, H.P. Baxxter comes out from behind the curtain and starts rapping. The people start dancing and then there are some shots of women dressed in underwear and rabbit ears in the same room (although it is empty). The video comes back to Scooter for a while, then cuts back to the two women, who are now topless. The women are later seen in bathtubs, now wearing bikinis. The rest of the video shows H.P. Baxxter rapping and people dancing and partying. At the end of the video there is confetti on the floor and everyone is asleep, apart from Scooter, who then leave in a limousine.

=== Track listings ===
German CD single

1. "Nessaja" (radio edit) – 3:28
2. "Nessaja" (extended) – 5:18
3. "Nessaja" (The Ultimate Clubmix) – 7:09
4. "Shortbread" – 3:55

German limited-edition CD single

1. "Nessaja" (radio edit) – 3:28
2. "Nessaja" (extended) – 5:18
3. "Nessaja" (The Ultimate Clubmix) – 7:09
4. "Nessaja" (Topmodelz mix) – 5:40
5. "Nessaja" (the video—uncensored version) – 3:28

European CD single

1. "Nessaja" – 3:28
2. "Nessaja" (The Ultimate Clubmix) – 7:09

European 12-inch single

A1. "Nessaja" (extended) – 5:18
B1. "Nessaja" (Ultimate club mix) – 7:09
B2. "Nessaja" (Topmodelz mix) – 5:40

UK CD single

1. "Nessaja" (radio edit) – 3:28
2. "Nessaja" (Clubstar UK remix) – 7:28
3. "Nessaja" (Flip & Fill remix) – 6:16
4. "Nessaja" (video UK edit) – 3:26

UK 12-inch single

A1. "Nessaja" (Clubstar UK remix) – 7:23
B1. "Nessaja" (Flip & Fill remix) – 6:14
B2. "Nessaja" (extended mix) – 5:18

UK cassette single

1. "Nessaja" (radio edit) – 3:28
2. "Nessaja" (Flip & Fill remix) – 6:14

Australian CD single

1. "Nessaja" (radio edit)
2. "Nessaja" (Clubstar UK remix)
3. "Nessaja" (Flip & Fill remix)
4. "Nessaja" (extended mix)
5. "Nessaja" (Ultimate club mix)

=== Charts ===
==== Weekly charts ====
| Chart (2002–2003) | Peak position |
|---|---|
| Australia (ARIA) | 24 |
| Australian Dance (ARIA) | 5 |
| Austria (Ö3 Austria Top 40) | 2 |
| Belgium (Ultratop 50 Flanders) | 16 |
| Denmark (Tracklisten) | 5 |
| Europe (Eurochart Hot 100) | 4 |
| Finland (Suomen virallinen lista) | 7 |
| Germany (GfK) | 1 |
| Hungary (Single Top 40) | 10 |
| Ireland (IRMA) | 7 |
| Ireland Dance (IRMA) | 1 |
| Netherlands (Dutch Top 40) | 21 |
| Netherlands (Single Top 100) | 9 |
| Norway (VG-lista) | 2 |
| Romania (Romanian Top 100) | 2 |
| Scotland Singles (Official Charts) | 2 |
| Sweden (Sverigetopplistan) | 21 |
| Switzerland (Schweizer Hitparade) | 7 |
| UK Singles (Official Charts) | 4 |
| UK Dance (Official Charts) | 11 |
| UK Indie (Official Charts) | 1 |

==== Year-end charts ====
| Chart (2002) | Position |
|---|---|
| Austria (Ö3 Austria Top 40) | 24 |
| Belgium (Ultratop 50 Flanders) | 95 |
| Europe (Eurochart Hot 100) | 44 |
| Germany (Media Control) | 18 |
| Ireland (IRMA) | 76 |
| Netherlands (Single Top 100) | 87 |
| Switzerland (Schweizer Hitparade) | 78 |
| UK Singles (OCC) | 119 |

| Chart (2003) | Position |
|---|---|
| Australian Dance (ARIA) | 18 |

=== Certifications ===
| Region | Certification | Certified units/sales |
|---|---|---|
| Germany (BVMI) | Gold | 250,000^{^} |
| Norway (IFPI Norway) | Gold | |
| United Kingdom (BPI) | Silver | 200,000^{‡} |
^{^} Shipments figures based on certification alone.^{‡} Sales+streaming figures based on certification alone.

=== Release history ===
| Region | Date | Format(s) | Label(s) | Ref. |
|---|---|---|---|---|
| Germany | 8 April 2002 | CD | Sheffield Tunes | |
| United Kingdom | 9 September 2002 | 12-inch vinyl; CD; cassette | Sheffield Tunes | |
| Australia | 11 November 2002 | CD | Addiction | |

=== In popular culture ===
Scooter's version of "Nessaja" featured in the opening credits of the 2009 film Brüno. The song was also featured in a scene of Episode 6 "GNVQ" of the BBC sitcom "This Country" and in a scene in Season 1, Episode 13 "Pyramid Scheme" of the American remake Welcome to Flatch.
