= Back to the Heavyweight Jam =

Studio album by Scooter
- Released: 27 September 1999
- Recorded: 1999
- Studios: Loop D.C. Studios 1 and 2, Hamburg, Germany
- Length: 48:11
- Labels: Club Tools, Loop Dance Constructions
- Producers: H.P. Baxxter; Rick J. Jordan; Axel Coon; Jens Thele

Scooter chronology
No Time to Chill (1998)	Back to the Heavyweight Jam (1999)	Sheffield (2000)

Singles from Back to the Heavyweight Jam
- 1. "Faster Harder Scooter" Released: 23 August 1999; 2. "Fuck the Millennium" Released: 15 November 1999

Back to the Heavyweight Jam is the sixth studio album by German band Scooter, released on 27 September 1999. It contains two singles, "Faster Harder Scooter" and "Fuck the Millennium".

After the single release of "Fuck the Millennium" the album was re-released in December 1999 in limited edition with bonus tracks.

The album title is borrowed from a repeated line in one of the versions of the KLF song "Last Train to Trancentral".

The album was re-released on LP on 9 December 2022, which was available on black and silver LP, with the silver coloured vinyl being limited to 500 copies.

== Track listing ==
All songs written and composed by H.P. Baxxter, Rick J. Jordan, Axel Coon, and Jens Thele. All lyrics written by The Radical MC H.P.

1. "Keyser Soze" – 1:12
2. "Watch Out" – 4:15
3. "FasterHarderScooter" – 3:46
4. "Well Done, Peter" – 3:53
5. "Fuck the Millennium" – 4:28
6. "The Revolution" – 4:05
7. "Psycho" – 5:05
8. "The Learning Process" – 4:55
9. "I'll Put You on the Guest List" – 5:11
10. "Main Floor" – 5:35
11. "Kashmir" – 4:44
12. "No Release" – 6:16

Strictly Limited Fuck the Millennium Edition:

1. "Fuck the Millennium" (Single Version)
2. "Dutch Christmas"
3. "Waiting for Spring / Let Me be Your Valentine" (Live)
4. "The Age of Love" (Live)
5. "No Fate" (Live)

Notes

- "Keyser Soze" samples the alien-contacting theme from the 1977 film Close Encounters of the Third Kind, also known as the noise programmed to unlock a door in the 1979 James Bond film Moonraker. When played backwards, the track contains the line "Use your dildo"
- "Faster Harder Scooter" samples the 1995 songs "Come On" by Axis and "The Sound of E" by Ultra Shock.
- "Well Done, Peter" samples the 1999 song "Embargo!" by Embargo.
- "Fuck the Millennium" samples "The Passion" by Technohead. The title of the track comes from a song by the same name by The KLF, released in 1997 under the pseudonym 2K. Likewise, "Back to the Heavyweight JAMs" is a refrain from The KLF's work. The version of the song released as a single contains a melody from Norman Petty song "Wheels", first recorded by The String-A-Longs in 1961.
- "The Revolution" samples the 1999 song "Who Do I Care" by Hermen.
- "The Learning Process" samples the 1995 song "Technocat" by Tom Wilson.
- "Main Floor" samples the song "Madagascar" by Art of Trance, taken from the 1999 album Voice of Earth.
- "Kashmir" samples the song "Living on the Ceiling" by the British synth-pop band Blancmange, taken from the 1982 album Happy Families and "Turkish Bazar" by Emmanuel Top.

== Charts ==
Chart performance for Back to the Heavyweight Jam
Chart (1999–2000)	Peak position
Finnish Albums (Suomen virallinen lista)	3
German Albums (Offizielle Top 100)	7
Hungarian Albums (MAHASZ)	1
Norwegian Albums (VG-lista)	35
Swedish Albums (Sverigetopplistan)	5
Swiss Albums (Schweizer Hitparade)	25

== Certifications ==
Certifications for Back to the Heavyweight Jam
Region	Certification	Certified units/sales
Germany (BVMI)	Gold	150,000^{^}
Sweden (GLF)	Gold	40,000^{^}
^{^} Shipments figures based on certification alone.
