= We Bring the Noise! =

Studio album by Scooter
- Released: 11 June 2001
- Recorded: 2001
- Studios: Loop D.C. Studios 1 and 2, Hamburg, Germany
- Genre: Techno
- Length: 58:17
- Label: Sheffield Tunes
- Producers: H.P. Baxxter; Rick J. Jordan; Axel Coon; Jens Thele

Scooter chronology
Sheffield (2000)	We Bring the Noise! (2001)	Push the Beat for This Jam (The Second Chapter) (2002)

Singles from We Bring the Noise!
- 1. "Posse (I Need You on the Floor)" Released: 21 May 2001; 2. "Aiii Shot the DJ" Released: 13 August 2001

We Bring the Noise! is the eighth studio album by German hard dance group Scooter, released on 11 June 2001 by Sheffield Tunes in Germany. Two singles were released from the album: "Posse (I Need You on the Floor)" on 21 May 2001, and a remix of "I Shot the DJ" entitled "Aiii Shot the DJ" on 13 August 2001. It is the last studio album featuring Axel Coon, who left the band in 2002 to pursue a solo career in DJing.

The album was re-released on LP on 9 December 2022, which was available on black and green LP, with the green coloured vinyl being limited to 500 copies.

== Track listing ==
All songs written by H.P. Baxxter a.k.a. Dave, Ice, The Chicks Checker, Rick J. Jordan, Axel Coon, and Jens Thele.

1. "Habibi Halua" – 1:08
2. "Posse (I Need You on the Floor)" – 3:50
3. "Acid Bomb" – 5:32
4. "We Bring the Noise!" – 3:44
5. "R U Happy?" – 5:19
6. "So What'cha Want" – 4:06
7. "Burn the House" – 4:34
8. "Chinese Whispers" – 6:23
9. "I Shot the DJ" – 3:39
10. "Transcendental" – 6:01
11. "Remedy" – 3:37
12. "Devil Drums" – 5:24

== Charts ==
Chart performance for We Bring the Noise!
Chart (2001)	Peak position
Austrian Albums (Ö3 Austria)	32
Finnish Albums (Suomen virallinen lista)	8
German Albums (Offizielle Top 100)	15
Hungarian Albums (MAHASZ)	3
Norwegian Albums (VG-lista)	12
Swedish Albums (Sverigetopplistan)	17
Swiss Albums (Schweizer Hitparade)	74
