= Scooter (band) =

German techno band

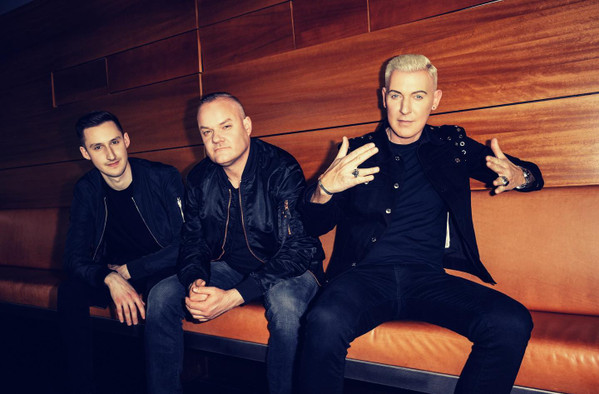
- Scooter in 2023, from left to right, Marc Blou, Jay Frog and H.P. Baxxter

Background information
- Also known as: Ratty
- Origin: Hamburg, Germany
- Genres: Techno; happy hardcore; hardcore techno; Eurodance
- Works: Scooter discography
- Years active: 1993–present
- Label: Sheffield Tunes (Kontor)
- Members: H. P. Baxxter; Marc Blou; Jay Frog; Jens Thele (Note: Scooter officially recognise Jens Thele as their fourth member. He is listed as such in liner notes of their releases since the very first single "Vallée de Larmes".)
- Past members: Rick J. Jordan; Ferris Bueller; Axel Coon; Phil Speiser; Etnik Zarari; Sebastian Schilde; Michael Simon
- Website: scootertechno.com

Scooter is a German happy hardcore, rave and techno music band founded in Hamburg in 1993. As of 2012, the band has sold over 30 million records and earned over 80 Gold and Platinum awards. Since December 2022, the band is composed of lead vocalist H. P. Baxxter, musician/producer Marc Blou, DJ/producer Jay Frog and manager Jens Thele.

Among their more well-known hits are "Crank It Up", "Hyper Hyper", "Move Your Ass!", "Friends", "Endless Summer", "Back in the U.K.", "I'm Raving", "Fire", "How Much Is the Fish?", "Ramp! (The Logical Song)", "Nessaja", "Weekend!", "Maria (I Like It Loud)", "One (Always Hardcore)" and "The Question Is What Is the Question?".

== Career ==
=== Celebrate the Nun (1985–1992) ===
At the end of 1985, H. P. Baxxter and Rick J. Jordan met in Hanover, Germany through a small ad and founded the synthpop/new wave band Celebrate the Nun. While the lead vocals were performed by Baxxter and female vocals were delivered by Baxxter's sister Britt Maxime, Rick J. Jordan took care of the keyboards and sound engineering. The band released their first album Meanwhile in 1989. AllMusic wrote that "During the mid-'80s, numerous synth pop acts dreamed of becoming the next Depeche Mode. Celebrate the Nun could have been buried in the glut of Depeche Mode doppelgangers; however, top-drawer songwriting and consistently catchy hooks lifted Celebrate the Nun above the mass of wannabes". The single "Will You Be There" off Meanwhile peaked at No. 5 on the Billboard Dance/Club play chart on 23 June 1990, whereas the single "She's a Secretary/Strange" peaked at No. 12 on Dance/Club play chart on 8 December of the same year. Slin Tompson, who was the fourth person in the band's original line-up, left the band in 1990 to start a project on his own. In 1991, the band released their second album Continuous, but this was less successful due to synthpop's declining popularity. Two singles were released off the second material, "Patience" and "You Make Me Wonder" both of which went without charting. Not finding the expected success in the New Wave arena, Baxxter kept working at the former Hamburg based Indie label (currently Edel Records) in the Distribution and Sales department where he met Scooter's future manager Jens Thele.

=== The Loop (1993–1998) ===
Soon afterwards, in late 1993, the former Celebrate the Nun members under the management of Jens Thele formed a remix team known as The Loop. The Loop became one of the top remix teams in Germany, releasing remixes for artists like Adeva, Holly Johnson, The Tag Team and RuPaul.

=== The First Chapter (December 1993–1998) ===
Scooter started as a project in December 1993. Their debut single was a cover of René et Gaston's "Vallée de larmes" (French for "Valley of Tears") and reached No.8 on the German official dance chart. In April 1994, Scooter played their first live show at the Palladium in Hamburg.

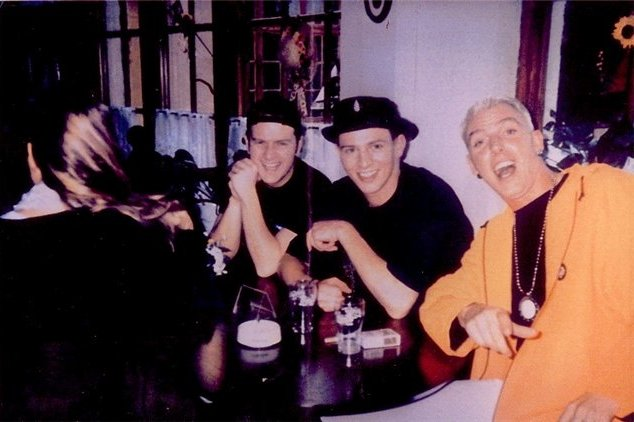
Scooter during 1st Chapter (1993–98). Left to right: Rick J. Jordan, Ferris Bueller, H. P. Baxxter.

At first, "Hyper Hyper" was expected to be a small hit within the club scene, but it managed to reach the No.2 position on the German single chart, Media Control, eventually going triple gold for selling 750,000 units. "Hyper Hyper" also entered the top-5 in Switzerland, Austria and in Italy, meanwhile, entering the top-10 in the Netherlands and Norway. Scooter's third single "Move Your Ass" reached No.3 on Media Control's single chart after a few weeks of its release and managed to achieve a gold status for sales of over 250,000 in Germany. The single also gained similar success as its predecessor outside of Germany, it entered the top-5 in Switzerland, Austria and the Netherlands, meanwhile, entering the top-10 in Norway and Italy. The follow-up singles, "Friends" and "Endless Summer" managed to enter the top-20 in number of countries including Switzerland, Austria and Finland.

The band maintained the initial technique of their sound throughout their second album, Our Happy Hardcore, until the style became noticeably different with their 1996 single "I'm Raving" (from the third album Wicked) as the tempos were down to 138 BPM from their previous tempos which were between the range of 160 and 190 BPM. The single reached No.4 in Germany and earned a gold certification for selling well over 250,000 units.

Scooter's fourth album, Age of Love, which reached the No.19 slot on Germany's Media Control album chart was the last album that featured Baxxter's cousin Ferris Bueller.

=== The Second Chapter (1998–2002) ===
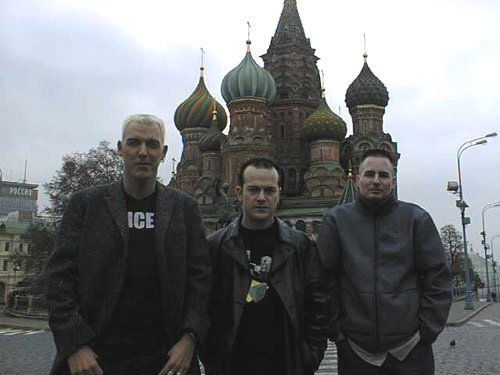
Scooter circa 2000. Left to right: H. P. Baxxter, Rick J. Jordan, Axel Coon.

In 1998, Ferris Bueller (Soren Buehler) left the group to pursue a solo career (he later admitted that he had been suffering from depression for several years due to his then new time-demanding life as a pop star), and was replaced by DJ Axel Coon, who had been working with the band at the recording studio for some time already. Coon had also played live with Scooter in some occasions, covering for Rick J. Jordan. In June 1998, Scooter released one of their most popular singles to date "How Much Is the Fish?" which peaked at No.3 in Germany, the single also went gold selling over 250,000 units in Germany alone. Their fifth studio album, No Time to Chill reached the No.4 position on Germany's Media Control album chart, whereas it topped the album chart in Finland and earned a gold-award for sales of over 36,000 units. In the same vein, the album reached a gold status in Poland for sales of over 50,000 units.

In July 1999, Scooter released their first single "Faster Harder Scooter", from their sixth album, Back to the Heavyweight Jam. While the single peaked at No.7 at home, it did quite well in Scandinavia peaking at No.3 in Sweden and No.2 in Finland, and the trio eventually picked up a platinum-award in Sweden for selling over 40,000 copies of the single. The second single, "Fuck the Millennium" was released in November 1999 which reached No.11 on Media Control singles charts and as its predecessor spent 11 weeks on the chart. The single as its predecessor did similarly well over in Scandinavia charting at No.3 in Sweden and No.4 in Finland, it eventually earned the trio a gold-award in Sweden for sales of over 20,000 units. The album, Back to the Heavyweight Jam just like the singles turned out to be a hit in Scandinavia, it entered the top-5 both in Finland and Sweden where it eventually reached a gold status for sales of over 40,000 units.

Scooter released their seventh studio album, Sheffield, in May 2000. Sheffield took another new direction containing 6/8 rhythms on tracks "Don't Gimme the Funk" and "Sex Dwarf". In late 2000, after their second single "She's the Sun", Scooter were awarded a Comet at the 2000 VIVA Comet Awards in the category of "Most Successful Dance Act".

The band's 21st single, "Posse (I Need You on the Floor)" was released in Germany on 21 May 2001, and it was the first Scooter single since "Endless Summer" to include a high-pitched voice in the chorus. The single peaked at No.7 at Scooter's home market, spending 13 weeks on the official single chart. Their eighth album, We Bring the Noise, released in June 2001, included another single, "Aiii Shot the DJ". A limited-edition version of the album included a cover of the 1978 City song "Am Fenster" as a bonus track.

In December 2001, Scooter released their 23rd single "Ramp! (The Logical Song)" from their Best of compilation album Push the Beat for This Jam. While the single went platinum in Australia and Norway, it managed to reach the No.2 position in the United Kingdom, where it went gold for sales of over 400,000 units. The album itself, which was released on 7 January 2002 managed to reach a gold status in the UK, Sweden and Norway.

=== The Third Chapter (2002–2006) ===
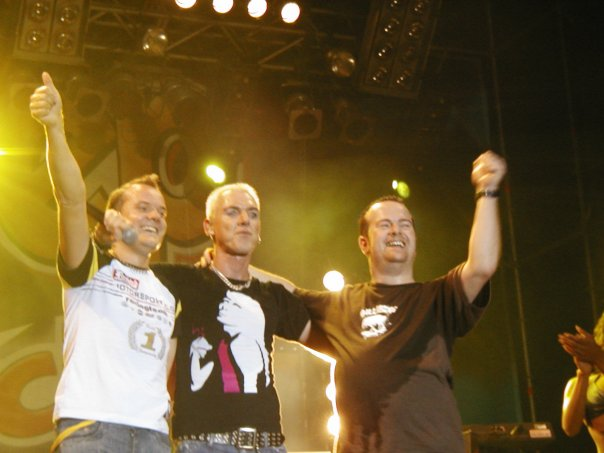
Scooter in 2004. Left to right: Jay Frog, H. P. Baxxter, Rick J. Jordan.

At the beginning of 2002, immediately after the release of trio's compilation album Push the Beat for this Jam, Axel Coon left the band to pursue a solo career in DJing and remixing, and Jay Frog became the new third person. Jay Frog was already familiar with the band as he had occasionally covered for Axel Coon.

As a quick way of introducing the new member Frog to their fans, the trio released a second compilation album in November 2002, 24 Carat Gold. Scooter's 24th single, "Nessaja" was a cover version of the title track from Peter Maffay's musical Tabaluga, and debuted at No.1 on the German official single charts. The single managed to reach a gold status in Germany for selling over 250,000 units. The single also did well in numerous markets including Austria, Norway and Denmark in all of which it entered the top-5, it also managed to enter the top-10 in Switzerland, Finland and the Netherlands.

Scooter enjoyed a comeback within the UK charts, with six top-20 UK singles "The Logical Song" (UK No.2), "Nessaja" (UK No.4), "Posse (I Need You on the Floor)" (UK No.15), "Weekend!" (UK No.12), "The Night" (UK No.16) and "Maria (I Like It Loud)" (UK No.16) all charting within an 18-month period.

In 2003, the video for "Weekend!" caused a scandal with its scenes of topless dancers. The song reached No.2 on the German Media Control single chart. That same year, under the pseudonym Ratty, the group re-released the trance record "Sunrise (Here I am)" featuring three new mixes. The single had previously reached number 6 in the UK dance chart in 2001.

In March 2003, Scooter released their next studio album, The Stadium Techno Experience. The album climbed to No.7 on the Media Control album chart and was certified gold in Sweden, Norway and Hungary. The single "The Night" became the last to feature the high pitched voice effect and reached the top-10 in Germany. The next single from the album, "Maria (I Like It Loud)", was released in collaboration with hardcore producers Marc Acardipane and Dick Rules, reaching No.4 on the single charts.

Mind the Gap was Scooter's 10th studio album, which was released on 8 November 2004 in three different versions, basic, regular and deluxe. While the album peaked at No.16 at home and spent 21 weeks on the album chart, the trio's 28th single, "Shake That!" flavored with 1970s disco sound was released on 4 October 2004 in most European countries, the single entered the German Media Control single chart peaking at No.8.

Their 11th studio album, Who's Got the Last Laugh Now?, featured a cover version of "Everlasting Love." The Who's Got The Last Laugh Now? 2006 tour was followed by the release of both the CD and the 2-disc DVD entitled Excess All Areas, one of the DVDs containing the final Hamburg concert of the tour and the second containing every music video released so far.

=== The Fourth Chapter (2006–2014) ===
Scooter on their Under the Radar Over the Top Tour, 2010

On 14 August 2006, it was announced that Jay Frog had decided to leave the band to pursue a solo career. Frog was replaced by Michael Simon, who had remixed some of Scooter's tracks while in search of success with his "Shahin & Simon" project. On 19 August, Scooter played at the Tufertschwil Open Air in Switzerland, where Simon debuted.

The single "Behind the Cow" was premiered at The Dome 40 in Düsseldorf on 1 December 2006, and was released on 19 January 2007. The song and its lyrics are based on "What Time Is Love?" by The KLF. Their 12th album The Ultimate Aural Orgasm, which includes the songs "The United Vibe" (cover version of Den Harrow's "Catch the Fox"), "Scarborough Affair" or "The Shit That Killed Elvis" (collaboration with Jimmy Pop, the frontman of American fun-rock-band The Bloodhound Gang), was released on 9 February 2007. The album peaked at No.6 in Germany and spent 16 weeks on the album chart. The second single released off The Ultimate Aural Orgasm was "Lass uns tanzen" which appeared in stores on 23 March. Despite the fact that the single peaked only at No.19 at home, it managed to stay on the singles chart for 18 weeks.

On 10 August, Scooter released a new single called "The Question Is What Is the Question?", the release of which surprised many of their fans as they were expecting a third single from the current album rather than an entirely new material. The single peaked at No.5 on the singles charts with overall of 26 weeks on the charts. That was a record as none of Scooter's previously released singles had so far remained that long within the singles charts. The band released a jumpstyle cover version of classic 1970s track "How Do You Do" by Mouth & MacNeal. Scooter released their 13th studio album, Jumping All Over the World, on 30 November 2007, containing all three singles ("The Question is What is the Question", "And No Matches" and "Jumping All Over the World"). A limited edition of the album contains a bonus CD including all Scooter's German top-10 hits, from "Hyper, Hyper" to "How Much is the Fish?" as well as a previously unreleased version of "The Question Is What Is The Question?"

In November 2007, the band made its debut tour of Australia, never having visited the country before despite their single "The Logical Song" peaking at No.1 there some 6 years earlier. Scooter performed at the famous Scattered rave party in Sydney as well as in Adelaide, Brisbane and Perth.

In March 2008, the group embarked on its first arena tour of the UK as part of Clubland Live, appearing alongside other All Around The World acts such as Cascada and Ultrabeat. During this tour, Scooter performed a retooled version of "I'm Lonely" from Jumping All Over the World; the single was released in Germany on 18 April 2008. "The Question Is What Is The Question" was released in the UK the same week, charting at No.49. The band made international news in May 2008 when Jumping All Over the World unexpectedly entered at No.1 on the UK Albums Chart, replacing Madonna's album Hard Candy after just one week. It was Scooter's first No.1 in the UK and first album release there in five years. The album eventually ended up earning the trio a platinum-award in the UK for sales of over 300,000 units.

Rick J. Jordan and Michael Simon together while promoting Under the Radar Over the Top

February 2009 saw the release of a Scooter tribute album entitled Hands on Scooter, featuring artists such as The Bloodhound Gang, Status Quo, and Sido covering or sampling Scooter songs.

During the summer of 2009, Scooter announced the release of their next studio album, Under the Radar Over the Top. On 14 August 2009, Scooter released "J'adore Hardcore", the first single from Under the Radar Over the Top. "J'adore Hardcore" was based on Planet Funk's "Chase the Sun" and The Pitcher's "I Just Can't Stop". On 30 July 2009, during the video shoot for "J'adore Hardcore", Baxxter was almost a victim of a car bomb attack in Mallorca, Spain. Michael Simon reported that Baxxter was alright and it was a very near miss. For their next single, "Ti sento", Scooter collaborated with Italian singer Antonella Ruggiero. "Ti sento" which peaked at No.10 in Germany, was released the day Under the Radar Over the Top was released. During the first week of sales, Under the Radar Over the Top peaked at No.2 on the German album chart. It was confirmed on 3 November 2009 that "The Sound Above My Hair" would be the third single from the album. The video premiered on YouTube on 12 November. The single was released on 27 November.

On 9 February 2010 it was announced that Scooter would perform the official song of the 2010 IIHF World Championship. This song would be "Stuck on Replay", and it would additionally be released as the fourth single from Under the Radar Over the Top.

The Under the Radar Over the Top Tour was announced before the album was released. The tour was a week long through several German cities such as Hamburg, Berlin, and Leipzig and one Swiss city, Zürich, throughout March 2010. This was the largest tour to date, and again featured the Sheffield Jumpers. During this tour, Scooter performed in front of a total of 40,000 people, and the Hamburg concert was the largest on the tour, with a sold-out venue of 14,000. This was followed by Leipzig, with 10,000 people attending the final concert of the tour.

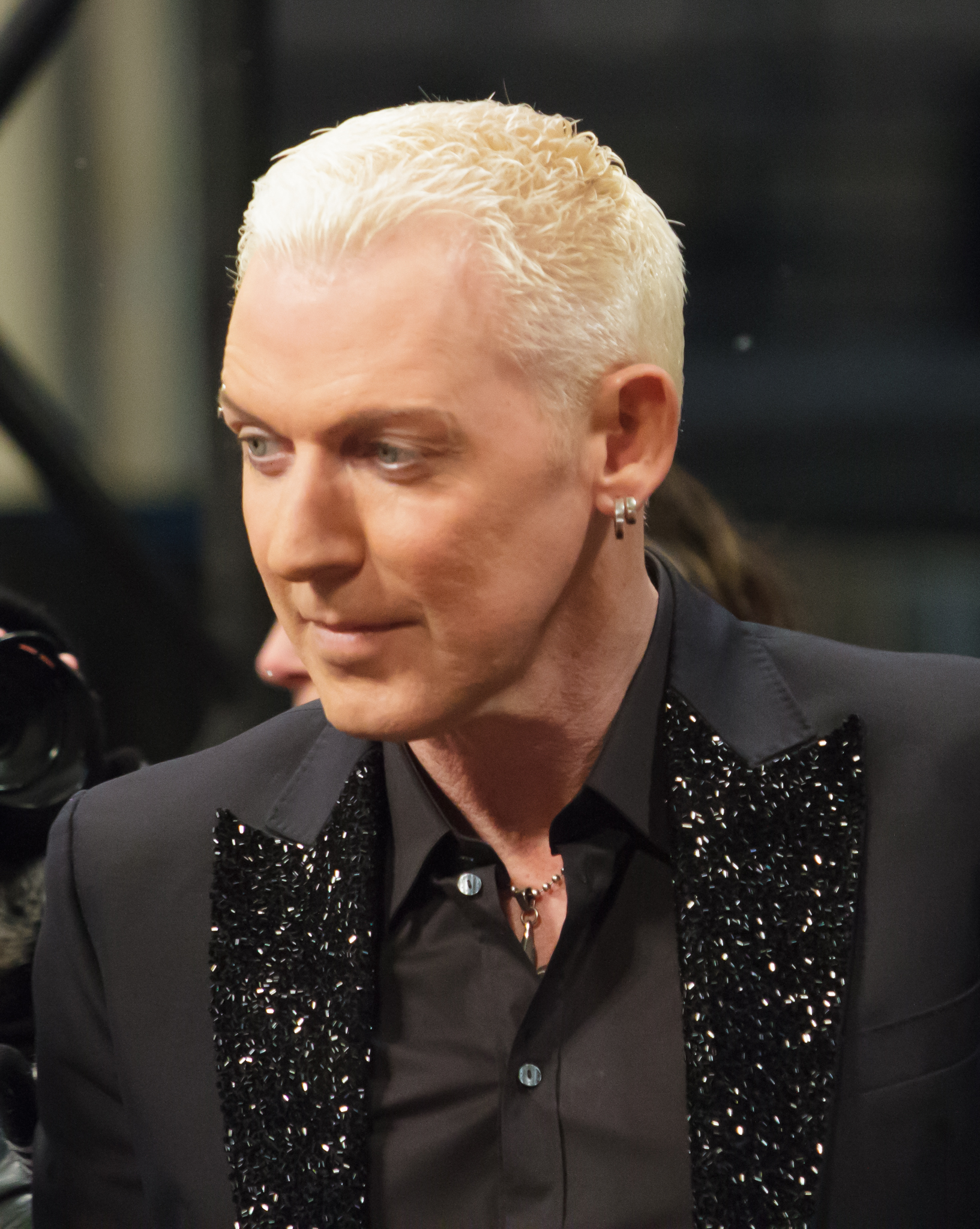
H. P. Baxxter at the Echo music award 2013

Regardless of the tour, "Stuck on Replay" peaked at only position No.34 on the German singles chart, but remained on the charts for 12 weeks.

A week after the tour, Scooter announced in an interview with a Russian radio station that a live DVD, CD, and Blu-ray of the Hamburg concert would be released. It was eventually announced that Scooter's fourth live DVD would be released on 7 May, called Live in Hamburg.

On 10 May 2010, Scooter announced another European tour to follow up the previous Under the Radar Over the Top tour, which would take place in December 2010, and be known as the "Stuff the Turkey X-mas" tour. It would tour through several German cities, such as Rostock, Stuttgart, and Dresden. At the same time, a very large concert was announced to take place in June of the next year, in Hamburg once again, at the HSH Nordbank Arena.

On 29 June 2010, it was announced that Scooter would be headlining the Clubland Live 4 Tour, appearing alongside acts such as Ultrabeat, ItaloBrothers, and Alex K. This would be Scooter's second tour of the United Kingdom. Interspersed among these dates were small concerts held at festivals such as Tomorrowland in Belgium, and in other places such as Iceland. However, on 6 October 2010, Clubland Live 4 was cancelled, thus cancelling the band's second UK tour.

On 15 April 2011, a re-worked version of Scooter's 1995 single "Friends" was released, entitled "Friends Turbo". It was the official theme for the German version of the Dutch film called New Kids Turbo.

Scooter's fifteenth studio album, entitled The Big Mash Up was released on 14 October 2011 - two years since the release of Under the Radar Over the Top being the longest gap between two albums in the band's history to date. The first single from the album, "The Only One", was released on 20 May 2011, which peaked at No.45. In comparison with all of Scooter's previous first singles representing a new material, "The Only One" is the first to have charted poorly. The second single, "David Doesn't Eat" was released on 14 October 2011, the same day as the album. The third single from The Big Mash Up, entitled "C'est Bleu", which features Vicky Leandros, was released on 2 December 2011. Both the second and the third singles charted worse than the first single, No.67 and No.77 respectively. Scooter's fourth single "It's a Biz (Ain't Nobody)" from the Big Mash Up was released on 23 March 2012. While the trio changed the sound of the song for a single release, it still didn't help it to chart higher than No.79 on the German Media Control singles chart. The album, however, did manage to enter the top-20 album chart peaking at No.15.

On 7 September 2012, Scooter released a new single called "4 AM", which, so far, is available on a digital format only. Scooter released their 16th studio album, Music for a Big Night Out on 2 November 2012. The same day, the trio released their second single entitled "Army of Hardcore" from their latest material.

=== The Fifth Chapter (2014–2018) ===
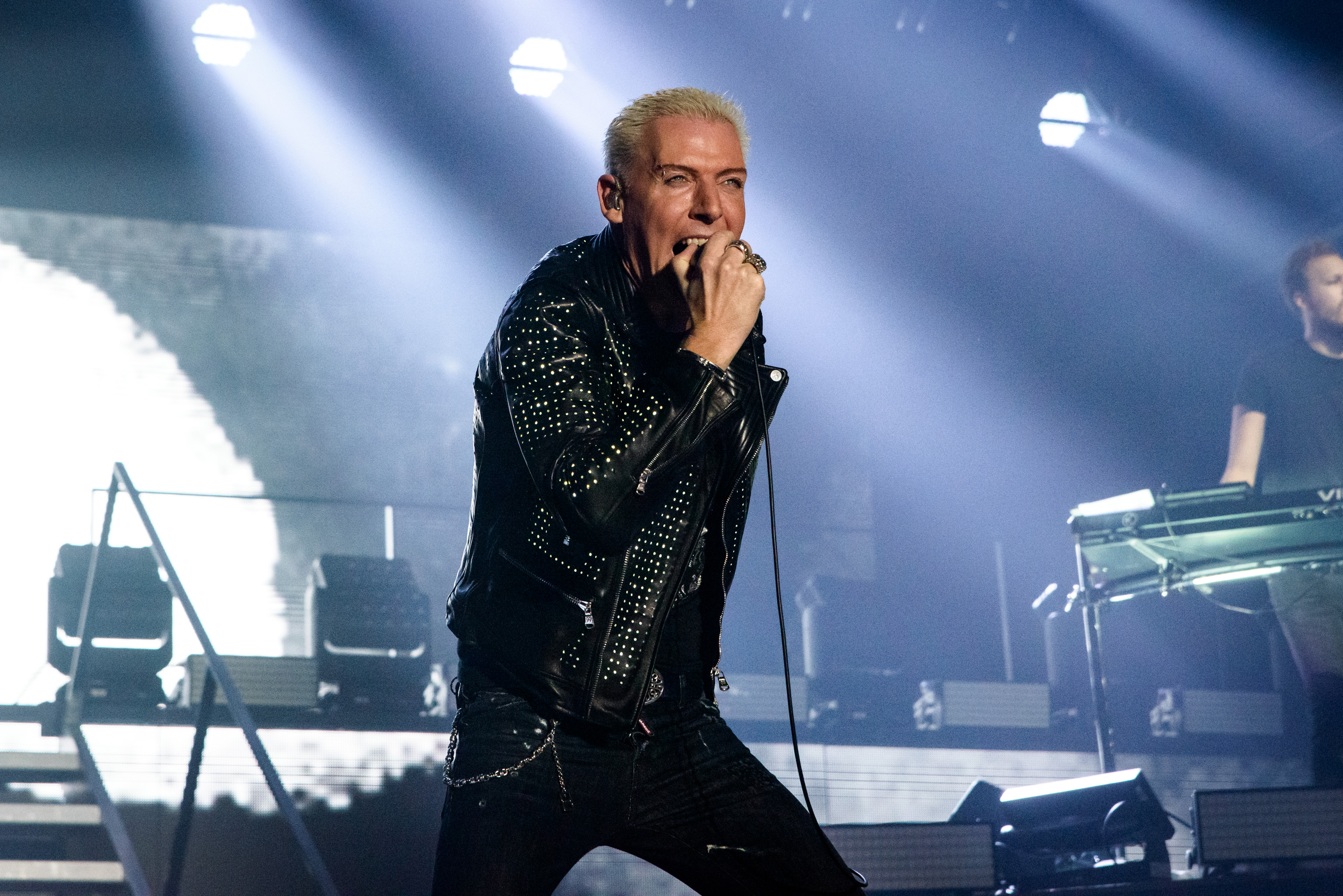
Baxxter in 2016

"After 20 fantastic hardcore years, I've come to realize that now is the time for me to try something new, to take a new musical direction and also to spend a bit more time with my family and friends."

— Rick J. Jordan on his exit

"A quarter century of making music together – we lasted longer than many marriages. It was a great time, and a successful one. A new chapter now begins!"

— H. P. Baxxter on Rick J. Jordan's exit

On 15 October 2013, Scooter officially announced that their founding member Rick J. Jordan would be leaving the band at the end of the trio's 20 Years of Hardcore Tour 2014. According to the frontman of Scooter, H. P. Baxxter, in the years ahead, Phil Speiser (from Dirty Disco Youth or DDY) will replace Rick J. Jordan's, who will provide his skills on the drums, synthesizers, piano as well as sound effects.

While The Fifth Chapter officially began for Scooter on 23 May 2014, when they released their single "Bigroom Blitz", the Hamburg-based trio's studio album, entitled The Fifth Chapter was made available on 26 September 2014, emphasizing a completely new era for the band. Scooter's next single "Today" from The Fifth Chapter was released on 26 September 2014.

On 4 January 2016, Scooter announced their eighteenth studio album Ace which was released on 5 February 2016. It includes their single "Riot" which has been available since 4 September 2015.

On 1 August 2017, Scooter announced their nineteenth studio album Scooter Forever which was released on 1 September 2017. It includes their single "Bora! Bora! Bora!" which has been available since 26 May 2017.

On 4 August 2017, Ukrainian prosecutors began legal proceedings against Scooter for their illegal performance at the "ZB Fest" festival in Crimea, as per Ukrainian law. However, according to H. P. Baxxter, they did not perform at the festival "to engage in politics there, but because we have a fan base there. We want to give them something."

On 6 December 2017, Scooter released their third single from Scooter Forever, which became a reconstructed version of "In Rave We Trust". The compilation album 100% Scooter – 25 Years Wild & Wicked was released on 15 December.

=== The Sixth Chapter (2019–2022) ===
On 11 November 2018, during the 25 Years Wild and Wicked Tour, Speiser announced that he would leave the band at the end of the tour.

In April 2019, Scooter officially announced that Sebastian Schilde would be replacing Phil Speiser, after Speiser had been with the group since 2014. Their twentieth album, God Save the Rave, was to be released in the winter of 2020 and include 15 tracks. The album's tour, the God Save the Rave tour, was originally expected to go ahead in the summer of 2020, but was postponed due to governments evoking pandemic laws. In December 2020, the album release date was postponed to 16 April 2021 due to pandemic laws again.

In November 2022, Schilde announced that he was no longer part of the group. A few days later, Simon announced that he had also left, after being a member since 2006.

=== The Seventh Chapter (2023–present) ===
After Schilde and Simon's departure, former member Jay Frog returned as a temporary keyboardist, later rejoining the group as the main producer, composer and keyboardist.

In January 2023, they released the single "Waste Your Youth", the first Scooter material to feature work by Jay Frog since 2005. Scooter also announced that then 23-year-old producer Marc Blou had joined the band.

In March 2023, Universal Music Germany announced it has acquired the master rights to the catalogue of Scooter. Universal Music Germany released Scooter's music worldwide under their Zeitgeist label in cooperation with Kontor Records.

== Band members ==
Current members

- H. P. Baxxter – vocals, MC, lyrics, guitar (December 1993 – present)
- Jens Thele – management (December 1993 – present)
- Jay Frog – producer, composer, keyboards, turntables (March 2002 – August 2006, November 2022 – present)
- Marc Blou – main producer, composer, keyboards (December 2022 – present)

Former members

- Rick J. Jordan – main producer, composer, sound design, audio engineering, keyboards, guitar (December 1993 – January 2014)
- Ferris Bueller – producer, composer, keyboards, dancer (December 1993 – March 1998)
- Axel Coon – producer, composer, keyboards, turntables (March 1998 – March 2002)
- Phil Speiser – main producer, composer, keyboards (January 2014 – October 2018)
- Sebastian Schilde – main producer, composer, keyboards (March 2019 – November 2022)
- Michael Simon – producer, composer, keyboards, turntables (August 2006 – December 2022)

Former touring members

- Etnik Zarari - keyboards (October 2018 – March 2019)
- Jeff "Mantas" Dunn - electric guitar (6 March 2006 – 26 March 2006, Who's Got the Last Laugh Now? Tour 2006)

=== Lineups ===
Period	Members	Releases
The First Chapter: December 1993 – March 1998	H. P. Baxxter – vocals, MC, lyrics, guitar; Rick J. Jordan – main producer, composer, sound design, audio engineering, keyboards, guitar; Ferris Bueller – producer, composer, keyboards, dancer; Jens Thele – management	... and the Beat Goes On! (1995); Our Happy Hardcore (1996); Wicked! (1996); Age of Love (1997); Rough and Tough and Dangerous – The Singles 94/98 (1998) (compilation)
The Second Chapter: March 1998 – March 2002	H. P. Baxxter – vocals, MC, lyrics, guitar; Rick J. Jordan – main producer, composer, sound design, audio engineering, keyboards, guitar; Axel Coon – producer, composer, keyboards, turntables; Jens Thele – management	No Time to Chill (1998); Back to the Heavyweight Jam (1999); Sheffield (2000); We Bring the Noise! (2001); Push the Beat for This Jam (The Second Chapter) (2002) (compilation); Encore: Live and Direct (2002) (live); 24 Carat Gold (2002) (compilation)
The Third Chapter: March 2002 – August 2006	H. P. Baxxter – vocals, MC, lyrics, guitar; Rick J. Jordan – main producer, composer, sound design, audio engineering, keyboards, guitar; Jay Frog – producer, composer, keyboards, turntables; Jens Thele – management	The Stadium Techno Experience (2003); Mind the Gap (2004); Live: Selected Songs of the 10th Anniversary Concert at Docks, Hamburg (2004) (live); Who's Got the Last Laugh Now? (2005); Excess All Areas (2006) (live)
The Fourth Chapter: August 2006 – January 2014	H. P. Baxxter – vocals, MC, lyrics, guitar; Rick J. Jordan – main producer, composer, sound design, audio engineering, keyboards, guitar; Michael Simon – producer, composer, keyboards, turntables; Jens Thele – management	The Ultimate Aural Orgasm (2007); Jumping All Over the World (2007); Under the Radar Over the Top (2009); Live in Hamburg (2010) (live); The Big Mash Up (2011); Music for a Big Night Out (2012); 20 Years of Hardcore (2013) (compilation)
The Fifth Chapter (Part 1): January 2014 – October 2018	H. P. Baxxter – vocals, MC, lyrics; Phil Speiser – main producer, composer, keyboards; Michael Simon – producer, composer, keyboards, turntables; Jens Thele – management	The Fifth Chapter (2014); Ace (2016); Scooter Forever (2017); 100% Scooter – 25 Years Wild & Wicked (2017) (compilation)
The Fifth Chapter (Part 2): October 2018 – March 2019	H. P. Baxxter – vocals, MC, lyrics; Etnik Zarari – keyboards; Michael Simon – keyboards, turntables; Jens Thele – management	none
The Sixth Chapter (Part 1): March 2019 – November 2022	H. P. Baxxter – vocals, MC, lyrics; Sebastian Schilde – main producer, composer, keyboards; Michael Simon – producer, composer, keyboards, turntables; Jens Thele – management	I Want You to Stream! (2020) (live); God Save the Rave (2021)
The Sixth Chapter (Part 2): November 2022 – December 2022	H. P. Baxxter – vocals, MC, lyrics; Michael Simon – keyboards; Jay Frog – keyboards; Jens Thele – management	none
The Seventh Chapter: December 2022 – present	H. P. Baxxter – vocals, MC, lyrics; Marc Blou – main producer, composer, keyboards; Jay Frog – producer, composer, keyboards, turntables; Jens Thele – management	Open Your Mind and Your Trousers (2024)

== Discography ==
Studio albums

- ... and the Beat Goes On! (1995)
- Our Happy Hardcore (1996)
- Wicked! (1996)
- Age of Love (1997)
- No Time to Chill (1998)
- Back to the Heavyweight Jam (1999)
- Sheffield (2000)
- We Bring the Noise! (2001)
- The Stadium Techno Experience (2003)
- Mind the Gap (2004)
- Who's Got the Last Laugh Now? (2005)
- The Ultimate Aural Orgasm (2007)
- Jumping All Over the World (2007)
- Under the Radar Over the Top (2009)
- The Big Mash Up (2011)
- Music for a Big Night Out (2012)
- The Fifth Chapter (2014)
- Ace (2016)
- Scooter Forever (2017)
- God Save the Rave (2021)
- Open Your Mind and Your Trousers (2024)

== Live performances ==
=== Concerts ===
Scooter are known for giving live performances with dancers on stage performing certain styles of dances, such as Jumpstyle or the Melbourne Shuffle. These are accompanied by laser shows and pyrotechnics. Frontman H. P. Baxxter often shouts out certain phrases and have them mimicked by the crowd between songs, and having the crowd sing along to the chorus of many songs.

=== List of tours ===
Year(s)	Tour title
1997	Age of Love Tour
1999	No Time to Chill Tour
2000	Sheffield Tour
2002	Push the Beat for This Jam Tour
2004	We Like It Loud Tour
2006	Who's Got the Last Laugh Now? Tour
2007	Lass uns tanzen Club Tour
2007	The Ultimate Aural Orgasm Australian Club Tour
2008	Jumping All Over the World Tour
2010	Under the Radar Over the Top Tour
2010	Stuff the Turkey X-mas Tour
2012	The Big Mash Up Tour
2014	20 Years of Hardcore Tour
2016	Can't Stop the Hardcore Tour
2017–2018	100% Scooter Wild & Wicked Tour
2020–2023	God Save the Rave Tour
2024	Thirty, Rough and Dirty! Tour
2027	Rave From Outer Space Stadium Tour

=== Standalone big shows ===
Year	Tour title
2011	The Stadium Techno Inferno

=== Tours headlined ===
Year	Tour title
2008	Clubland Live Tour
2012	We Love the 90's Tour

== Awards ==
Year	Award
2003	Viva Comet Award – Best Dance Act
2003	Echo Award – Best Dance Single
2004	Echo Award – Best Dance Act
2009	The Dome Award – For 20 Performances at the Dome
2010	Viva Platinum Comet Award – All Time Most Played

== In popular culture ==
- In the 1997 film Mortal Kombat Annihilation (sequel to 1995's Mortal Kombat), "Fire" was used during the fight between Liu Kang, Kitana, Smoke and some ninjas.
- In 1998, Scooter made a guest appearance on the popular German action/crime TV series Alarm für Cobra 11 – Die Autobahnpolizei. In the episode Tödlicher Ruhm ("Deadly Fame"), Baxxter is held for ransom by a young DJ who accuses him of stealing lyrics for the song "The Age of Love".
- Oliver Pocher, a German comedian, performed a comedy spoof of H. P. Baxxter on VIVA.
- Beginning in 2000, "Crank It Up" was used as the theme tune for Brüno's segments on Da Ali G Show.
- In 2003, the English dance music group Emmet formed a Scooter tribute act titled "Moped". Their songs received airplay on BBC Radio 1.
- Scooter tracks are often featured in releases of the Les Mills group fitness programs.
- The Norwegian comedy duo Bye & Rønning made several parodies of Scooter, including Scooter in studio and Party in Heaven.
- "Nessaja" was used in the opening of the 2009 film Brüno.
- "How Much is the Fish?" often played during goalscoring and after victory matches of FC Lokomotiv Moscow.
- Beginning in 2010, "Maria (I Like It Loud)", is played after every home team goal at Philadelphia Union's soccer stadium Subaru Park. It has also been played after a goal at the Philadelphia Flyers' arena, the Xfinity Mobile Arena, and at Borussia-Park, the stadium of Borussia Mönchengladbach.
- H. P. Baxxter took part in an advertisement campaign for German newspaper Bild in 2011 and for German megastore Saturn.
- H. P. Baxxter was one of the four jury members at Germany's 2012 X Factor.
- "Nessaja" was played by in "GNVQ"; the 2017 episode of BBC Three mockumentary This Country.
- In a 2021 interview, lead writer Helen Hindpere described Scooter as one of the inspirations behind the game Disco Elysium.
