= Aiii Shot the DJ =

"Aiii Shot The DJ"

Single by Scooter

from the album We Bring the Noise!
- Released: 13 August 2001
- Recorded: Loop D.C. Studio1, Hamburg, Germany
- Length: 3:30
- Label: Sheffield Tunes
- Songwriter(s): H.P. Baxxter; Rick J. Jordan; Axel Coon; Jens Thele
- Producer(s): Scooter

Scooter singles chronology
"Posse (I Need You on the Floor)" (2001)	"Aiii Shot The DJ" (2001)	"Ramp! (The Logical Song)" (2001)

"Aiii Shot The DJ" is a song by German band Scooter. It was released in August 2001 as the second and final single from their eighth studio album We Bring the Noise!.

== Music video ==
The music video features German comedian Helge Schneider as a DJ in Timmendorfer Strand.

== Track listing ==
CD single

1. "Aiii Shot the DJ" (Radio Version) – 3:30
2. "Aiii Shot the DJ" (Extended Version) – 4:52
3. "Aiii Shot the DJ" (Bite the Bullet Mix) – 6:38
- "Aiii Shot the DJ" Video (Multimedia Part)

12-inch single

1. "Aiii Shot the DJ" (Extended Version) – 4:52
2. "Aiii Shot the DJ" (Bite the Bullet Mix) – 6:38

Download

1. "Aiii Shot the DJ" (Radio Version) – 3:30
2. "Aiii Shot the DJ" (Extended Version) – 4:52
3. "Aiii Shot the DJ" (Bite the Bullet Mix) – 6:38

== Chart performance ==
Chart performance for "Aiii Shot the DJ"
Chart (2001–2002)	Peak position
Austria (Ö3 Austria Top 40)	22
Finland (Suomen virallinen lista)	16
Germany (GfK)	29
Sweden (Sverigetopplistan)	37
Switzerland (Schweizer Hitparade)	98
