= Posse (I Need You on the Floor) =

2001 single by Scooter

Single by Scooter

from the album We Bring the Noise!
- Released: 21 May 2001
- Studio: Loop D.C. Studio 1 (Hamburg, Germany)
- Length: 3:50
- Label: Sheffield Tunes
- Songwriters: H.P. Baxxter; Rick J. Jordan; Axel Coon; Jens Thele
- Producer: Scooter

Scooter singles chronology
"She's the Sun" (2000)	"Posse (I Need You on the Floor)" (2001)	"Aiii Shot the DJ" (2001)

"Posse (I Need You on the Floor)" is a song by German band Scooter. It was released on 21 May 2001 as the lead single from their eighth studio album, We Bring the Noise!. The song reached the top 10 in Austria, Germany, and Romania and the top 20 in Denmark, Finland, and Sweden. In the United Kingdom, following the success of "The Logical Song" and "Nessaja", it was released in November 2002 and reached number 15 on the UK Singles Chart.

The song samples "What Time Is Love?" by the KLF, taken from their 1991 album The White Room. The lyrics "I'm bigger, and bolder, and rougher, and tougher, in other words sucker there is no other" is from Human Resource's 1991 song "Dominator".

== Track listings ==
German CD single

1. "Posse (I Need You on the Floor)" (radio version) (3:50)
2. "Posse (I Need You on the Floor)" (extended version) (6:38)
3. "Posse (I Need You on the Floor)" (Tee Bee mix) (7:00)
4. "Posse (I Need You on the Floor)" (club mix) (6:39)

UK CD single

1. "Posse (I Need You on the Floor)" (UK radio edit) (3:47)
2. "Posse (I Need You on the Floor)" (N-Trance edit) (4:12)
3. "Posse (I Need You on the Floor)" (UK extended version) (5:29)
4. "Posse (I Need You on the Floor)" (N-Trance extended mix) (6:03)
- "Posse (I Need You on the Floor)" (Video UK edit) (multimedia section)

12-inch single

1. "Posse (I Need You on the Floor)" (extended version) (6:38)
2. "Posse (I Need You on the Floor)" (Tee Bee mix) (7:00)
3. "Posse (I Need You on the Floor)" (club mix) (6:39)

Download

1. "Posse (I Need You on the Floor)" (live from Encore) (5:03)
2. "Posse (I Need You on the Floor)" (extended version) (6:40)
3. "Posse (I Need You on the Floor)" (Tee Bee mix) (7:02)
4. "Posse (I Need You on the Floor)" (club mix) (6:41)

== Charts ==
=== Weekly charts ===
Chart (2001–2002)	Peak position
Austria (Ö3 Austria Top 40)	7
Belgium (Ultratop 50 Flanders)	44
Denmark (Tracklisten)	15
Europe (Eurochart Hot 100)	31
Finland (Suomen virallinen lista)	20
Germany (GfK)	7
Ireland (IRMA)	23
Ireland Dance (IRMA)	2
Netherlands (Single Top 100)	65
Romania (Romanian Top 100)	8
Scottish Singles Sales (Official Charts)	12
Sweden (Sverigetopplistan)	16
Switzerland (Schweizer Hitparade)	43
UK Singles (Official Charts)	15
UK Dance (Official Charts)	29
UK Indie (Official Charts)	2

=== Year-end charts ===
Chart (2001)	Position
Germany (Media Control)	71
Romania (Romanian Top 100)	98

== Release history ==
Region	Date	Format(s)	Label(s)	Ref.
Germany	21 May 2001	CD	Sheffield Tunes	
United Kingdom	25 November 2002	12-inch vinyl; CD; cassette	Sheffield Tunes	
