= She's the Sun =

Single by Scooter

from the album Sheffield
- B-side: "Sunrise (Ratty's Inferno)"
- Released: 14 August 2000
- Recorded: 2000
- Studio: Loop DC Studios 1 and 2, Hamburg, Germany
- Length: 3:44
- Label: Sheffield Tunes
- Songwriter(s): H.P. Baxxter; Rick J. Jordan; Axel Coon; Jens Thele
- Producer(s): Rick J. Jordan; Axel Coon

Scooter singles chronology
"I'm Your Pusher" (2000)	"She's the Sun" (2000)	"Posse (I Need You on the Floor)" (2001)

"She's the Sun" is a song by German band Scooter. It was released in August 2000 as the second and last single from their seventh studio album Sheffield.

== Content ==
The drum loop in "She's the Sun" is sampled from the introduction of Led Zeppelin's version of "When the Levee Breaks", taken from the 1971 album Led Zeppelin IV. "Sunrise (Ratty's Inferno)" was used as the basis for "Sunrise (Here I Am)", the 2001 début single from Scooter's side project Ratty.

== Track listing ==
CD single

1. "She's the Sun" (Radio Edit) – 3:44
2. "She's the Sun" (Extended) – 4:52
3. "Sunrise (Ratty's Inferno)" – 5:39
- "She's the Sun" video – 4:00

Limited edition CD single

1. "She's the Sun" (Radio Edit) – 3:44
2. "She's the Sun" (Extended) – 4:52
3. "Sunrise (Ratty's Inferno)" – 5:39
4. "H.P. for your Answering Machine Vol. 1" – 0:10
5. "H.P. for your Answering Machine Vol. 2" – 0:06
- "She's the Sun" video – 4:00

== Chart performance ==
Chart performance for "She's the Sun"
Chart (2000)	Peak position
Germany (GfK)	41
