= The Logical Song =

1979 single by Supertramp

- European standard picture sleeve

Single by Supertramp

from the album Breakfast in America
- B-side: "Just Another Nervous Wreck"
- Released: March 1979
- Recorded: 1978
- Studio: The Village Recorder (Los Angeles)
- Genre: Progressive pop; pop rock
- Length: 4:11
- Label: A&M
- Songwriters: Roger Hodgson; Rick Davies
- Producers: Supertramp; Peter Henderson

Supertramp singles chronology
| "Babaji" (1977) | "The Logical Song" (1979) | "Breakfast in America" (1979) |

Music video
- "The Logical Song" on YouTube

"The Logical Song" is a song by British rock group Supertramp that was released as the lead single from their album Breakfast in America in March 1979. It was written primarily by the band's frontman Roger Hodgson, who based the lyrics on his experiences being sent away to boarding school for ten years. The song became Supertramp's biggest hit, rising to No. 7 in the United Kingdom and No. 6 on the US Billboard Hot 100 chart. In 2001, a cover version by the band Scooter returned the song to the top 10 in several European countries.

== Background ==
"The Logical Song" was written primarily by Roger Hodgson, the lyrics based on his experience of being sent away to boarding school for ten years. It was a very personal song for Hodgson; he had worked on the song during soundchecks, and completed the lyrics and arrangement six months before proposing it to the band for the album. In 1980, Hodgson was honoured with the Ivor Novello Award from The British Academy of Composers and Songwriters for "The Logical Song" being named the best song both musically and lyrically.

Hodgson has said of the song's meaning: "'The Logical Song' was born from my questions about what really matters in life. Throughout childhood we are taught all these ways to be and yet we are rarely told anything about our true self. We are taught how to function outwardly, but not guided to who we are inwardly. We go from the innocence and wonder of childhood to the confusion of adolescence that often ends in the cynicism and disillusionment of adulthood. In 'The Logical Song', the burning question that came down to its rawest place was 'please tell me who I am', and that's basically what the song is about. I think this eternal question continues to hit such a deep chord in people around the world and why it stays so meaningful."

The lyrics have been said to be a condemnation of an education system focused on categorical jargon as opposed to knowledge and sensitivity. Billboard writer David Farrell described the song's theme as a "man lost in the world." Ultimate Classic Rock critic Nick DeRiso described the theme as "the loss of childhood idealism."

== Composition ==
"The Logical Song"
A 21-second sample of Supertramp's "The Logical Song" where the instrumental break is played.

The song is written in the key of C minor and is set in the time signature of common time (although the verses follow a 10-beat pattern of 4/4 – 2/4 – 4/4) with a tempo of 120 beats per minute. Roger Hodgson's vocal range spans two octaves, from G_{3} to E♭_{5}. The song makes use of keyboards, castanets, and an instrumental section. Among the contemporary sound effects in this song are a sound from Mattel Electronics' Football handheld game, popular at the time this song was released. The song's main instrument is a Wurlitzer electric piano fed through a Boss CE-1 chorus pedal. The chorus features an Elka Rhapsody 610 string synthesiser, also fed through the CE-1, and an Oberheim Four Voice synthesiser.

== Reception ==
Stephen Holden of Rolling Stone called the song a "small masterpiece", praising the "hot sax" and Hodgson's "wry humor". The magazine also made comparisons between Hodgson and Ray Davies from the Kinks. Paul McCartney named "The Logical Song" as his favourite song of the year. Billboard considered it to be possibly Supertramp's best song to date with "solid and incisive lyrics" and a catchy hook. Cash Box said that "a skillful and probing lyric and a raucous sax line are joined by a familiar circling guitar lick and excellent singing" and also praised the "emphatic" beat. Record World said that it "should hit the AORs first with Top 40 likely to follow."

The song was a hit on its original release, reaching No. 7 in the United Kingdom and No. 6 in the United States. The song achieved the most success in Canada where it spent two weeks at No. 1 on the Canadian RPM Singles Chart, was the top song of the year, and was certified Platinum in Canada. It stayed for three months on the Billboard Hot 100 in the middle of 1979.

Hodgson rated it as one of the top 10 songs he ever wrote.

== Personnel ==
Personnel are sourced from Sound on Sound.

- Roger Hodgson – lead and backing vocals, Wurlitzer electronic piano, electric and 12-string acoustic guitars
- Rick Davies – Elka Rhapsody 610 and Oberheim Four Voice synthesisers, acoustic piano, Hammond organ, Hohner Clavinet with wah-wah, backing vocal
- John Helliwell – alto saxophone, siren whistle, backing vocal, intro breathing
- Bob Siebenberg – drums, castanets, timbales, cowbell, woodblocks
- Dougie Thomson – bass guitar

== Charts ==
=== Weekly charts ===
| Chart (1979) | Peak position |
|---|---|
| Australia (Kent Music Report) | 16 |
| Austria (Ö3 Austria Top 40) | 14 |
| Belgium (Ultratop 50 Flanders) | 19 |
| Belgium | 9 |
| Canada (RPM) Top Singles | 1 |
| Ireland (IRMA) | 6 |
| Italy (AFI) | 14 |
| Netherlands (Single Top 100) | 13 |
| New Zealand (Recorded Music NZ) | 13 |
| Portugal (Música & Som) | 8 |
| South Africa (Springbok Radio) | 3 |
| Spain (AFE) | 12 |
| UK Singles (Official Charts) | 7 |
| US Billboard Hot 100 | 6 |
| US Cash Box Top 100 | 4 |
| West Germany (GfK) | 12 |

=== Year-end charts ===
| Chart (1979) | Rank |
|---|---|
| Canada | 1 |
| US Billboard | 27 |
| US Cash Box | 37 |
| West Germany | 43 |

== Certifications ==
| Region | Certification | Certified units/sales |
|---|---|---|
| Canada (Music Canada) | Platinum | 150,000^{^} |
| Denmark (IFPI Danmark) | Gold | 45,000^{‡} |
| France (SNEP) | Gold | 500,000^{*} |
| Italy (FIMI) sales since 2009 | Gold | 35,000^{‡} |
| Spain (Promusicae) | Platinum | 60,000^{‡} |
| United Kingdom (BPI) | Gold | 400,000^{‡} |
^{*} Sales figures based on certification alone.^{^} Shipments figures based on certification alone.^{‡} Sales+streaming figures based on certification alone.

== Scooter version ==
"The Logical Song"

Single by Scooter

from the album Push the Beat for This Jam (The Second Chapter)
- B-side: "Siberia"
- Released: 10 December 2001
- Length: 3:57
- Label: Sheffield Tunes
- Songwriter: Roger Hodgson
- Producer: Scooter

Scooter singles chronology
| "Aiii Shot the DJ" (2001) | "The Logical Song" (2001) | "Nessaja" (2002) |

Music video
- "The Logical Song" on YouTube

German techno band Scooter covered "The Logical Song" and released it as a single in 2001 under the title "Ramp! (The Logical Song)"; for later releases, including those in the UK and Australia, the song retained its original title. Scooter's cover is included on their second singles compilation album, Push the Beat for This Jam (The Singles 98–02). This version heavily samples Supertramp's recording, and makes lyrical references to British stadium house band the KLF.

The single reached No. 1 in Norway and Ireland, as well as in Australia in October 2002. It reached No. 2 in the United Kingdom, becoming Scooter's highest-charting single there; it has been certified gold by the British Phonographic Industry (BPI), selling over 400,000 copies, and was the UK's 15th-best-selling single of 2002.

The Scooter version was an anthem in Glasgow's rave culture throughout the 2000s.

=== Track listings ===
German maxi-CD single

1. "Ramp! (The Logical Song)" – 3:53
2. "Ramp! (The Logical Song)" (extended version) – 6:07
3. "Ramp! (The Logical Song)" (club mix) – 7:23
4. "Siberia" – 2:53

German limited-edition maxi-CD single

1. "Ramp! (The Logical Song)" – 3:53
2. "Ramp! (The Logical Song)" (extended version) – 6:07
3. "Ramp! (The Logical Song)" (club mix) – 7:00
4. "Ramp! (The Logical Song)" (Starsplash mix) – 7:17
5. "Ramp! (The Logical Song)" (Jay Frog mix) – 6:24

German 12-inch single

A1. "Ramp! (The Logical Song)" (club mix) – 7:00
A2. "Ramp! (The Logical Song)" (extended version) – 6:07
B1. "Ramp! (The Logical Song)" (Starsplash mix) – 7:17
B2. "Ramp! (The Logical Song)" (Jay Frog mix) – 6:24

European CD single

1. "Ramp! (The Logical Song)" – 3:53
2. "Ramp! (The Logical Song)" (club mix) – 7:23

UK CD single

1. "The Logical Song" (radio edit) – 3:53
2. "The Logical Song" (Clubstar remix) – 7:41
3. "The Logical Song" (D-Bop UK mix) – 7:36

UK 12-inch single

A. "The Logical Song" (club mix) – 7:00
B. "The Logical Song" (Clubstar remix) – 7:41

UK cassette single

1. "The Logical Song" (radio edit) – 3:53
2. "The Logical Song" (Clubstar remix) – 7:41

Australian CD single

1. "The Logical Song" (radio edit)
2. "The Logical Song" (Clubstar remix)
3. "The Logical Song" (D-Bop UK mix)
4. "The Logical Song" (extended version)
5. "The Logical Song" (club mix)
6. "The Logical Song" (Starsplash mix)

=== Charts ===
==== Weekly charts ====
| Chart (2001–2002) | Peak position |
|---|---|
| Australia (ARIA) | 1 |
| Australian Dance (ARIA) | 1 |
| Austria (Ö3 Austria Top 40) | 4 |
| Denmark (Tracklisten) | 10 |
| Europe (Eurochart Hot 100) | 12 |
| Finland (Suomen virallinen lista) | 11 |
| France (SNEP) | 53 |
| Germany (GfK) | 7 |
| Ireland (IRMA) | 1 |
| Ireland Dance (IRMA) | 1 |
| Norway (VG-lista) | 1 |
| New Zealand (Recorded Music NZ) | 32 |
| Romania (Romanian Top 100) | 8 |
| Scottish Singles Sales (Official Charts) | 2 |
| Sweden (Sverigetopplistan) | 8 |
| Switzerland (Schweizer Hitparade) | 14 |
| UK Singles (Official Charts) | 2 |
| UK Dance (Official Charts) | 8 |
| UK Indie (Official Charts) | 1 |

==== Year-end charts ====
| Chart (2002) | Position |
|---|---|
| Australia (ARIA) | 20 |
| Australian Dance (ARIA) | 4 |
| Austria (Ö3 Austria Top 40) | 16 |
| Europe (Eurochart Hot 100) | 40 |
| Germany (Media Control) | 45 |
| Ireland (IRMA) | 6 |
| Sweden (Hitlistan) | 52 |
| UK Singles (OCC) | 15 |

=== Certifications ===
| Region | Certification | Certified units/sales |
|---|---|---|
| Australia (ARIA) | Platinum | 70,000^{^} |
| Germany (BVMI) | Gold | 250,000^{‡} |
| Norway (IFPI Norway) | Platinum | |
| United Kingdom (BPI) | 2× Platinum | 1,200,000^{‡} |
^{^} Shipments figures based on certification alone.^{‡} Sales+streaming figures based on certification alone.

=== Release history ===
| Region | Date | Format(s) | Label(s) | Ref. |
|---|---|---|---|---|
| Germany | 10 December 2001 | CD | Sheffield Tunes | |
| Australia | 19 August 2002 | CD | Addiction | |
