= I'm Your Pusher (Scooter song) =

2000 single by Scooter

Single by Scooter

from the album Sheffield
- B-side: "Firth of Forth"
- Released: 29 May 2000
- Length: 4:00
- Label: Sheffield Tunes
- Songwriters: Allan Gray; Walter Reisch; H.P. Baxxter; Rick J. Jordan; Axel Coon; Jens Thele
- Producers: Rick J. Jordan; Axel Coon

Scooter singles chronology
"Fuck the Millennium" (1999)	"I'm Your Pusher" (2000)	"She's the Sun" (2000)

"I'm Your Pusher" is a song by German band Scooter based on the melody of "Flieger, Grüß' Mir Die Sonne" by Allan Gray and Walter Reisch. It was released in May 2000 as the lead single off the album Sheffield. It is the first single to be released from the sublabel of Kontor Records, Sheffield Tunes.

== Chart performance ==
Chart performance for "I'm Your Pusher"
Chart (2000)	Peak position
Austria (Ö3 Austria Top 40)	33
Belgium (Ultratip Bubbling Under Flanders)	11
Finland (Suomen virallinen lista)	19
Germany (GfK)	17
Portugal (AFP)	2
Sweden (Sverigetopplistan)	27
Switzerland (Schweizer Hitparade)	74
