= City (band) =

German rock band

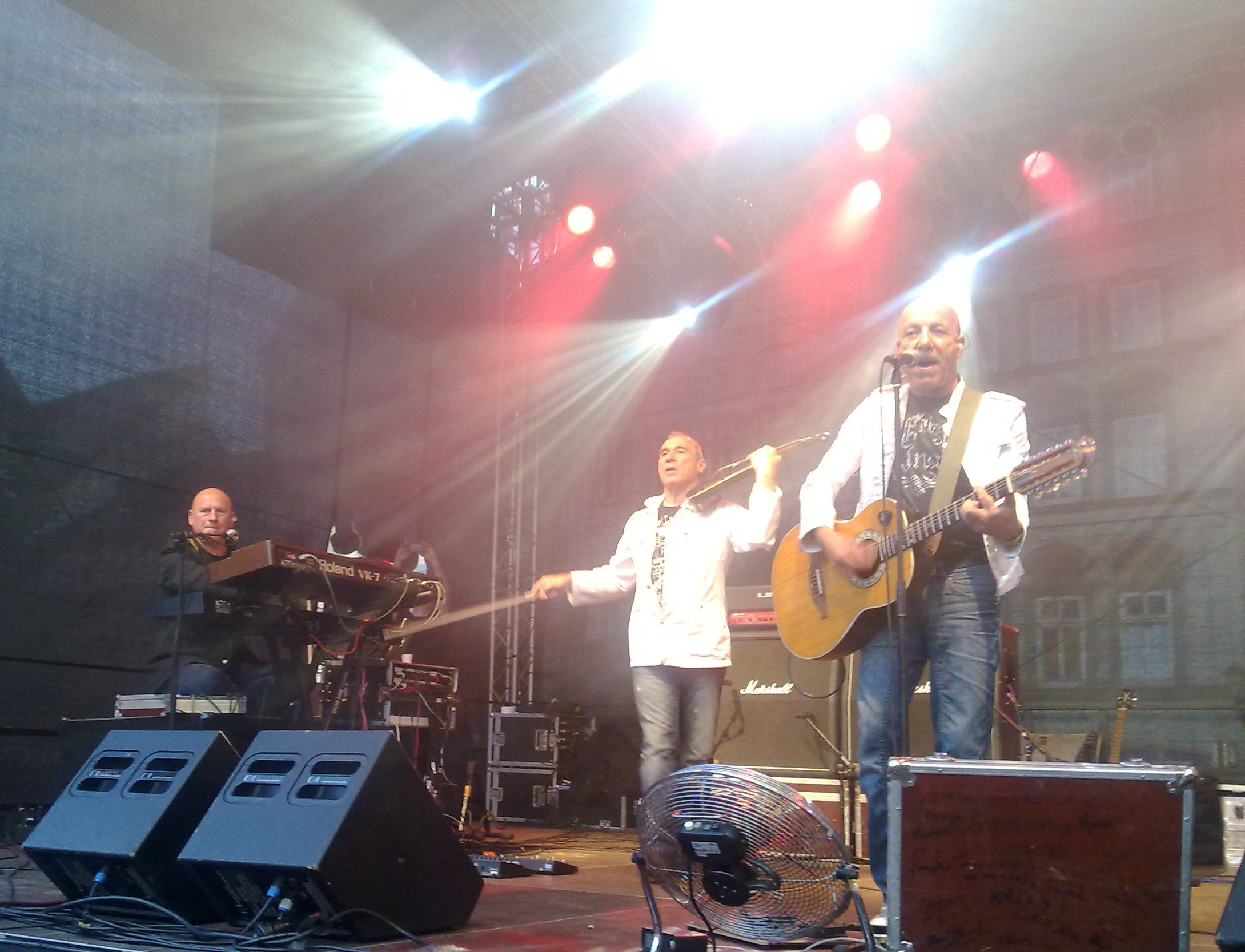
- City performing live in Jena in May 2005

Background information
- Also known as: City Band Berlin, City Rock Band
- Origin: East Berlin, Germany
- Genres: Rock; hard rock; folk rock; art rock; alternative rock
- Years active: 1972–2022
- Members: Fritz Puppel; Manfred Hennig; Georgi Gogow; Toni Krahl
- Past members: Ingo Doering; Klaus Witte; Frank Pfeiffer; Andreas Pieper; Klaus Selmke (died 22 May 2020)
- Website: city-internet.de

City is a German rock band, formed in East Berlin in 1972, best known for the song "Am Fenster" ("At/By The Window") from its 1978 debut album.

The band was founded as the City Band Berlin by Fritz Puppel (guitar), Klaus Selmke (drums), Ingo Doering (bass guitar), Klaus Witte (keyboards), Frank Pfeiffer (vocals) and Andreas Pieper (flute). The lineup changed frequently in the band's early years, but stabilized by 1976, with Puppel and Selmke joined by Bulgarian violinist and bassist Georgi Gogow and vocalist-guitarist Toni Krahl. They changed their name to City Rock Band and eventually to simply City.

City toured extensively in East Germany, and was given the opportunity to record an album in 1978. The eponymous City showcased the band's guitar-driven rock; several songs are parables, such as "Der King vom Prenzlauer Berg" (The King of Prenzlauer Berg), about a young man who gets into too many fights; and "Meister aller Klassen" (Masters of All Classes"), about cocky motorcyclists whose desire for speed ends in tragedy.

The band's greatest commercial success, however, was the atypical folk rock-influenced "Am Fenster" (At the Window), which arose from a jam session in the studio when Gogow began to play on his violin. It eventually coalesced into a three-part, 17-minute piece (as well as a four-minute version for radio play). An immediate hit in East Germany, it also became successful in West Germany and was a success in countries such as Greece. Following the song's success, City sold half a million copies. In 2019, "Am Fenster" was voted by a jury as the best song of all time from East Germany.

== Discography ==
- 1978: "Am Fenster" ("At The Window"; released in West Germany as City)
- 1979: "Der Tätowierte" ("The Tattooed Man"; released in West Germany as City II)
- 1980: Dreamer (English language album, released in West Germany as Dreamland)
- 1983: Unter der Haut (Under The Skin)
- 1985: Feuer im Eis (Fire in Ice)
- 1987: Casablanca
- 1990: Keine Angst (No Fear)
- 1991: Rock aus Deutschland Ost Vol. 11 – City, die Erfolge 1977–1987 (Compilation album)
- 1992: The Best of City (Compilation album)
- 1997: Rauchzeichen (Smoke Signals)
- 1997: Am Fenster (Platinum Edition)
- 2002: Am Fenster 2
- 2003: Das Weihnachtsfest der Rockmusik (Album with Keimzeit) (Christmas Festival Of Rock Music)
- 2004: Silberstreif am Horizont (Silver Line on the Horizon)
- 2007: Yeah! Yeah! Yeah!
- 2007: Yeah! Yeah! Yeah! (Limited edition, five-song-live-CD)
- 2008: Das Beste (Four-CD compilation)
- 2008: Play it again! Das Beste von City (Best-Of-Album including new tracks, remixes and a videoclip)
- 2012: Für immer jung (Forever Young)
- 2012: City - Die Original Alben, Hansa Amiga (Sony Music) (Compilation of the original City albums)
- 2012: 40 Jahre City (Das Konzert), (Sony Music)
- 2013: Danke Engel (CD/DVD Unplugged and five new tracks)
- 2015: Rocklegenden live, Puhdys + City + Karat
- 2017: Das Blut so laut, Rhingtön (Universal Music)
- 2022: Die Letzte Runde (Universal Music)
