= Faster Harder Scooter =

Single by Scooter

from the album Back to the Heavyweight Jam
- Released: 23 August 1999
- Length: 3:42
- Label: Club Tools
- Songwriters: H. P. Baxxter; Rick J. Jordan; Axel Coon; Jens Thele

Scooter singles chronology
| "Call Me Mañana" (1999) | "Faster Harder Scooter" (1999) | "Fuck the Millennium" (1999) |

"Faster Harder Scooter" is a song by German group Scooter. It was released in August 1999 as the lead single from the 1999 album Back to the Heavyweight Jam. The song is played as an anthem by FC Tokyo as the players walk out on home games.

== Track listing ==
CD single

1. "Faster Harder Scooter" – 3:42
2. "Faster Harder Scooter" (full length) – 4:24
3. "Faster Harder Scooter" (club mix) – 5:21
4. "Faster Harder Scooter" (Sunbeam remix) – 9:23
5. "Faster Harder Scooter" (Signum remix) – 7:20

== Charts ==
=== Weekly charts ===
Weekly chart performance for "Faster Harder Scooter"
| Chart (1999–2000) | Peak position |
|---|---|
| Austria (Ö3 Austria Top 40) | 24 |
| Belgium (Ultratop 50 Flanders) | 17 |
| Europe (Eurochart Hot 100) | 29 |
| Europe Border Breakers (Music & Media) | 25 |
| Finland (Suomen virallinen lista) | 2 |
| Germany (GfK) | 7 |
| Norway (VG-lista) | 15 |
| Sweden (Sverigetopplistan) | 3 |
| Switzerland (Schweizer Hitparade) | 20 |

=== Year-end charts ===
Year-end chart performance for "Faster Harder Scooter"
| Chart (1999) | Position |
|---|---|
| Germany (Media Control) | 91 |
| Sweden (Hitlistan) | 26 |

== Certifications ==
Certifications for "Faster Harder Scooter"
| Region | Certification | Certified units/sales |
|---|---|---|
| Sweden (GLF) | Platinum | 30,000^{^} |
^{^} Shipments figures based on certification alone.
