= Fuck the Millennium (Scooter song) =

Single by Scooter

from the album Back to the Heavyweight Jam
- B-side: "New Year's Day"
- Released: 12 November 1999
- Length: 4:28 (Album version); 3:58 (Single Version); 4:12 (Video)
- Songwriters: H.P. Baxxter; Rick J. Jordan; Axel Coon; Jens Thele

Scooter singles chronology
"Faster Harder Scooter" (1999)	"Fuck the Millennium" (1999)	"I'm Your Pusher" (2000)

"Fuck the Millennium" is a song by German group Scooter. It was released in November 1999 as the second single from the album Back to the Heavyweight Jam. It reached the top-ten in three countries, peaking at number 2 in Belgium (Flanders), number 3 in Sweden and number 4 in Finland.

== Content ==
The song samples "The Passion" by Technohead. For the single release, the track was completely remixed. The new version of the song contains a sample of The String-A-Longs' song "Wheels".

The bearing vocal phrase of the song is originally from the KLF's song with the same name from 1997, "Fuck the Millennium".

== Music video ==
The music video of the song shows a concert of Scooter and backstage material.

== Track listing ==
1. "Fuck the Millennium" – 3:58
2. "Fuck the Millennium" (Extended) – 5:15
3. "New Year's Day" – 6:39

== Charts ==
=== Weekly charts ===
Weekly chart performance for "Fuck the Millennium"
Chart (1999–2000)	Peak position
Austria (Ö3 Austria Top 40)	15
Belgium (Ultratop 50 Flanders)	2
Finland (Suomen virallinen lista)	4
Germany (GfK)	11
Sweden (Sverigetopplistan)	3
Switzerland (Schweizer Hitparade)	61

=== Year-end charts ===
Year-end chart performance for "Fuck the Millennium"
Chart (1999)	Position
Sweden (Hitlistan)	59

Chart (2000)	Position
Belgium (Ultratop 50 Flanders)	53

== Certifications ==
Certifications for "Fuck the Millennium"
Region	Certification	Certified units/sales
Sweden (GLF)	Gold	15,000^{^}
^{^} Shipments figures based on certification alone.
