= Jay Frog =

German DJ and producer (born 1976)

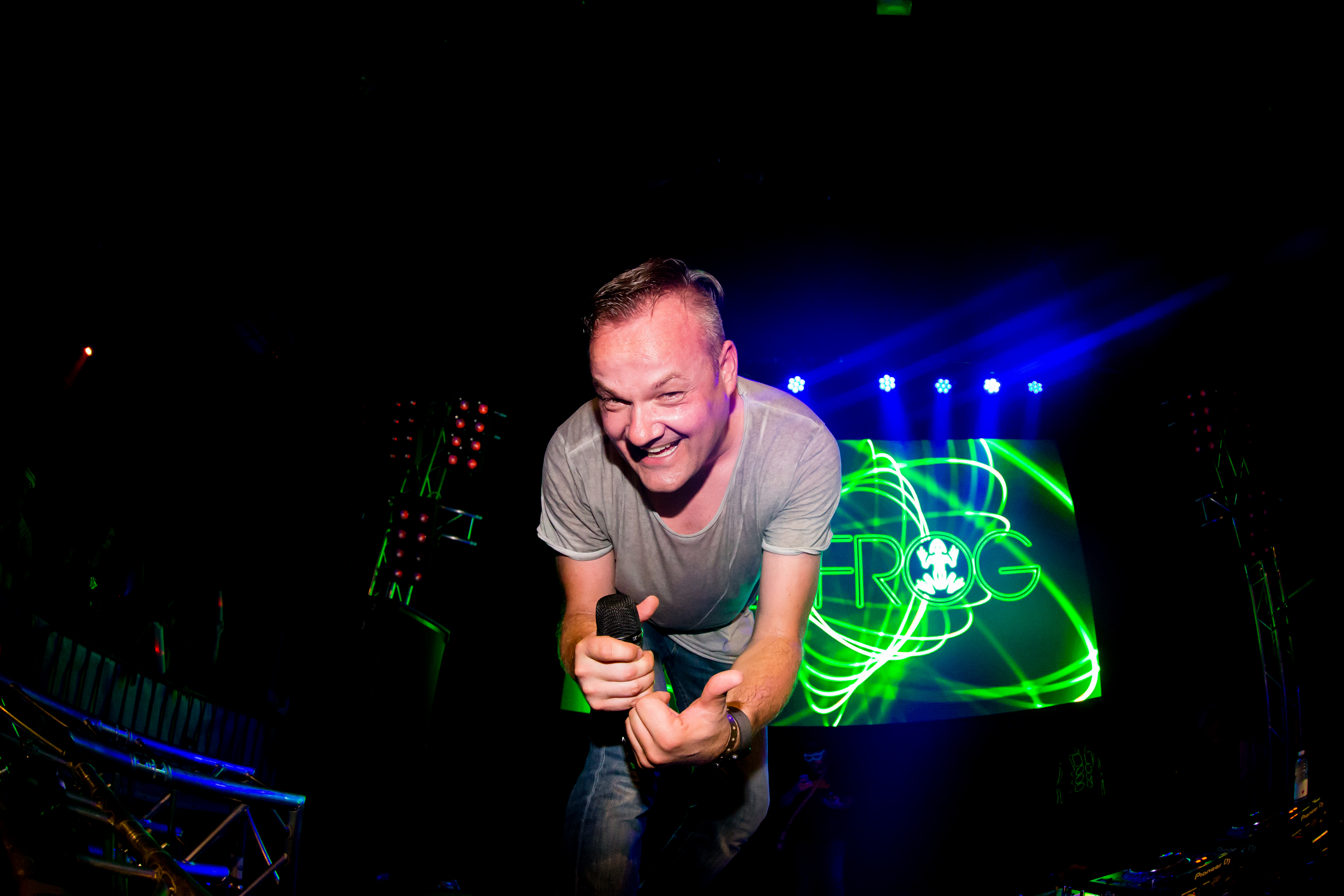
- Jay Frog in 2016

Background information
- Also known as: Miss Thunderpussy; Sans Souci; Squib
- Born: Jürgen Frosch; May 7, 1976 (age 50); Ludwigshafen, Germany
- Genres: Electronic dance music
- Occupation: Disc jockey
- Years active: 1997-present
- Labels: Kontor Records; Dance of Toads; Jungle Funk; Tiger
- Member of: Scooter
- Formerly of: Planet Trax; Master & Servant
- Website: jayfrog.de

Jürgen Frosch (born 7 May 1976), better known by his stage name Jay Frog, is a German DJ and house musician. He began his solo career when he departed the band Scooter in 2006. Since then, he has released several singles on Kontor Records and various other labels. Frog returned to Scooter in December 2022.

== Discography ==
=== Albums ===
- Europe Endless – The Highest State of Trance (1996)
- Rosie Gaines – Closer Than Close (mint Planet Trax) (2000)
- Mirage Club Traxx 2 (2000)
- Planet Trax Trance Mix Vol. 1 (2001)
- Clubmission 01 (2001)
- 7 Years Of DMD (2001)
- Clubmission 02 (2002)
- Abfahrt! (2002)
- Kontor – Top Of The Clubs Vol.20 (2003)
- Scooter – The Stadium Techno Experience (2003)
- Kontor – Top Of The Clubs Vol.23 (2004)
- Scooter – Mind the Gap (2004)
- Vision Parade 2004
- Scooter – Who's Got The Last Laugh Now? (2005)
- E-Royale (2007)
- Doug Laurent – I'm Rushin' (mint Planet Trax) (2007)
- Legend B – Lost In Love (2008)
- Sans Souci – Urban Safari (2014)

=== Singles ===
- Liquid Flow – Heart of Africa (1997)
- Paragon Inc. – Call Me Legion (1998)
- Planet Trax – Do What You Like (1999)
- Miss Thunderpussy – The Ride (1999)
- ?! – Secrets of Asia (1999)
- Trance Action – Slide Into Infinity (1999)
- Dark Horizon – Final Force (1999)
- Techno Teens – Winke, Winke...! (Bye, Bye...!) (2000)
- Club Invaders vs. Miss Thunderpussy – Mirage (2000)
- Rainmaker – Eternal Fire (2000)
- Trance Action – Everlasting Dreams (2000)
- Nils Bergen – 18 Fast Cumshots (2000)
- Legend B – Strynx of Life (2000)
- Jay Frog – Pushin' (2001)
- Rainmaker – Rainmaker (2001)
- Nicky Davis – To Munich (2001)
- Rainmaker – Renegade Master (2001)
- Jeff & Jay – I Wanna Be A Hippie (2001)
- Legend B – Voyage (2001)
- Miss Thunderpussy – Give It To Me (2003)
- Gorf – Silence (2007)
- Jay Frog – Hungry Animal (2007)
- Sans Souci – Globus / Palladium (2007)
- Master & Servant – Master And Servant / Aua! (2008)
- Sans Souci – Jewel Box (2008)
- Jay Frog – Der Flug Auf Dem Glücksdrachen (2008)
- Dirty Disco Dudes – Hymn (2008)
- Master & Servant – Step By Step / Why Don't You (2009)
- Frog & Bugle – Seven Days To Eden (2009)
- Jayson Green – Looking For (2009)
- Beam vs. Frog – Rocka (2009)
- Jay Frog – I Won't Let You Down (2009)
- Master & Servant – Into The Groove (2009)
- Discoglossus – Mon Sac Est Plein (2010)
- Squib – So Tell Me / I Love This Music (2010)
- Colina – Farben (2010)
- Francesco Diaz & Jeff Rock – Overdose (2011)
- Francesco Diaz & Jeff Rock – Reflect (2011)
- Jay Frog – It's Alright (2011)
- Francesco Diaz & Jeff Rock – AL (2011)
- Francesco Diaz & Jeff Rock – Reflect (2011)
- David Costa & Jeff Rock – Luanda (2011)
- Francesco Diaz & Jeff Rock – Disco (2015)
- Sans Souci – Kaduna (2011)
- Bonkers – Coloured (2011)
- Francesco Diaz & Jeff Rock – God Save The Queen (2011)
- Francesco Diaz & Jeff Rock – Almdudler (2011)
- Colina – Du & Ich (2012)
- Jay Frog – Crazy (2012)
- Jay Frog & Amfree – No Alternative (Again) (2012)
- Francesco Diaz & Jeff Rock – Alella (2012)
- Francesco Diaz & Jeff Rock – Moin Moin (2012)
- Squib – Tapas In Spain (2012)
- Sans Souci – Pandora (Flamingo Road) (2013)
- Jay Frog & Holmes – No Bitch Connected (2013)
- Jay Frog & Amfree – Is This Love? (2013)
- Jay Frog & Melleefresh – Peekaboo (2013)
- Jay Frog & Erick Decks – Sho Nuff Funky (2013)
- Jay Frog & Sean Finn – Tetriz (2013)
- Jay Frog – Break Free (2013)
- Jay Frog – Silence (2013)
- Master & Servant – Kiezgold (2013)
- Jay Frog & Deko-ze – Toads In The Jungle EP (2014)
- Master & Servant – Katzengold (2014)
- Jay Frog – Beatbox Rocker (2014)
- Jay Frog – Girls (2014)
- Jay Frog – Duele el Amor (2014)
- Jay Frog & Eric Smax – Come and Take It (2014)
- Jay Frog & Pascal Dolle – Silver Screen (2014)
- Jay Frog & KLC – Tzzzz (2014)
- Jay Frog & Eric Smax – Human Life (2014)
- Jay Frog & Florian Arndt – People (2014)
- Jay Frog & Deko-ze – One Night In Toronto (2014)
- Jay Frog & Deko-ze – Uh-huh (2015)
- Francesco Diaz & Jeff Rock – Back 2 Oldschool (2015)
- Jay Frog, Lizzie Curious & Terri B – Fired Up (2015)
- Jay Frog – Marrakesh (2015)
- Francesco Diaz & Jay Frog – We Got To (2015)
- Jay Frog & Sash! – Easy Find (2015)
- Sans Souci – Calling (2015)
- Jay Frog – 1976 / White Course (2015)
- Francesco Diaz, Jay Frog & David Costa – The DJ is Calling (2015)
- Discoglossus – Autobahn (2015)
- Jay Frog & MC Flipside – The Tribe (2015)
- Jay Frog & Pascal Dolle feat Dacia Bridges – Share Love (2015)
- Jay Frog & KLC – Da Beat (2016)
- Jane Vogue & Jay Frog feat. Elaine Winter – Sway (2016)
- Jay Frog & Holmes – Like It (2016)
- Sans Souci – Sweet Harmony (2016)
- Jay Frog & Slippy Beats feat. Jolie Lassen – Lovin Me (2016)
- Francesco Diaz & Jay Frog – Arabian Nights (2016)
- Sans Souci – Niagara (2016)
- Dennis Grkn & Jay Frog – Back & Forth (2016)
- Jay Frog & Alex Kash – Singin' In My Mind (2016)
- Jay Frog & Jerome Robins – Just Be Good To Me (2017)
- Discoglossus – Origin (2017)
- Jay Frog & Patrick Hoffmann – Keep On Searchin' (2017)
- Jay Frog & DJ Blackstone – Somebody's Watching Me (2017)
- Sans Souci – Citrus Grove (2017)
- Lev Kitkin & Jay Frog – No One (2017)
- Jay Frog – Acid (2017)
- Eric Decks & Jay Frog – U Got The Love (2017)
- Jay Frog & Amfree – Is This Love 2017 (2017)
- Sans Souci – Safe In Your Arms (2017)
- Marc Reason & Jay Frog – Sunchyme 2k18 (2017)
- Sans Souci – Twin Lakes (2017)
- Jay Frog & Herr Mehl – Lift You Up (2017)
- Jay Frog & Slippy Beats – Like The First Time (2017)
- DJ Worris & Jay Frog – Groovebird (2018)
- Jay Frog & E.M.C.K. – What You Want (2018)
- Jay Frog – One Bass Drum (2018)
- Jay Frog & Jerome Robin – Apologize (2018)
- Sans Souci – Comina (2018)
- Sans Souci – Take My Breath Away (2018)
- Sans Souci – Seaside (2018)
- Jay Frog – Hey Baby! (2018)
- Frobe – Hymn (2019)
- Jay Frog & Sarah de Warren – Strobe Lights (2019)
- Sans Souci – My Neck My Back (2019)
- Jay Frog & Erick Decks – Crank It Up (2019)
- Sans Souci – Pleshiwar (2019)
- Sans Souci – Denicola (2019)
- Jay Frog – Jasemba (In My Arms) (2019)
- Jay Frog & Hoxtones – Bring The Funk (2019)
- E.M.C.K. & Jay Frog – Your Love (2019)
- Hoxtones & Jay Frog – Move My Body (2019)
- Jay Frog & Larry H. Soulman – Life, Liberty, Just Us (2019)
- Sans Souci – Oxnard (2019)
- Hoxtones & Jay Frog – Keep On (2020)
- Frobe & Nacho – Stand Up (2020)
- Hoxtones & Jay Frog – Electro Circus (2020)
- Jay Frog & Sunny Marleen – Hello (2020)
- Sans Souci – Alvaro (2020)
- Jay Frog & Sunny Marleen – Need You (2020)
- Jay Frog & E.M.C.K. – Friiesel (2020)
- Nizza Noize – Sunshine Reggae (2020)
- Sans Souci – Venice (2020)
- Jay Frog – Spartacus (2020)
- Sans Souci – Fenton (2020)
- Squib – New Horizon (2020)
- Jay Frog & Disco Boys – I Think (2020)
- Jay Frog – Jaguar (2020)
- Amfree & Jay Frog – Can't Fight The Moonlight (2020)
- Sans Souci – Nanika (2021)
- Jay Frog & Fabrizio Levita – You Came (2021)
- Hoxtones & Jay Frog – Don't Wake Me Up (2021)
- Jay Frog & Fabrizio Levita – Wouldn't It Be Good (2021)
- Hoxtones, Jay Frog & Aboutblank – Laid Back (2021)
- Felix Harrer, Jay Frog & Sunny Marleen – Your Lies (2021)
- Jay Frog x Amfree x Blaze U – To France (2021)
- Jay Frog & E.M.C.K. – Mia (2021)
- Sans Souci – Condor (2021)
- Talla2XLC & Jay Frog – Native American (2021)
- Jay Frog & Fabrizio Levita – Ride Like The Wind (2021)
- Jay Frog – Take Me Baby (2021)
- Jay Frog – Flowers (2021)
- Sans Souci – Nanda (2021)
- Jay Frog & Amfree – House Hooray (Party & Bullshit) (2022)
- Jay Frog – Take Your Time (2022)
- Jay Frog & Sunny Marleen – Amigos (2022)
- Jay Frog & Sunny Marleen – Need Some Space (2022)
- Jay Frog & Amfree – You Got The Love (2022)
- Jay Frog & Slippy Beats – The Nighttrain (2022)
- Jay Frog & Rene De La Mone – Next To You (2022)
- Sans Souci – Makatao (2022)
- Jay Frog & Sunny Marleen – For You (2022)
- Jay Frog & The Disco Boys – Promised Land (2022)
- Jay Frog & Diver City – The Vibe (2022)
- Jay Frog & Hoxtones – U Can't Touch This (2022)
- Jay Frog & DJ Nirro – Move On (2022)
- Jay Frog x FR3SH TrX – Break The Silence (2022)
- Jay Frog – Savior (2023)

== Major festivals ==
- Dunaszeg, Club Colorado (September 15 2007)
