= Sheffield Tunes =

German record label

- Founded: 2000
- Founder: H.P. Baxxter, Rick J. Jordan, Jens Thele
- Status: Active
- Distributor(s): Kontor Records
- Genre: Electronic music
- Country of origin: Germany
- Location: Hamburg

Sheffield Tunes is a German record label, and a sublabel of Kontor Records, formed in 2000 by H.P. Baxxter, Rick J. Jordan and Jens Thele. The first album released by Sheffield Tunes was Sheffield (released on 26 June 2000), and the first single was "I'm Your Pusher", by Scooter. Sheffield Tunes also owns the Sheffield Jumpers.

== Artists ==
- Scooter
- Sheffield Jumpers
