= Scooter discography =

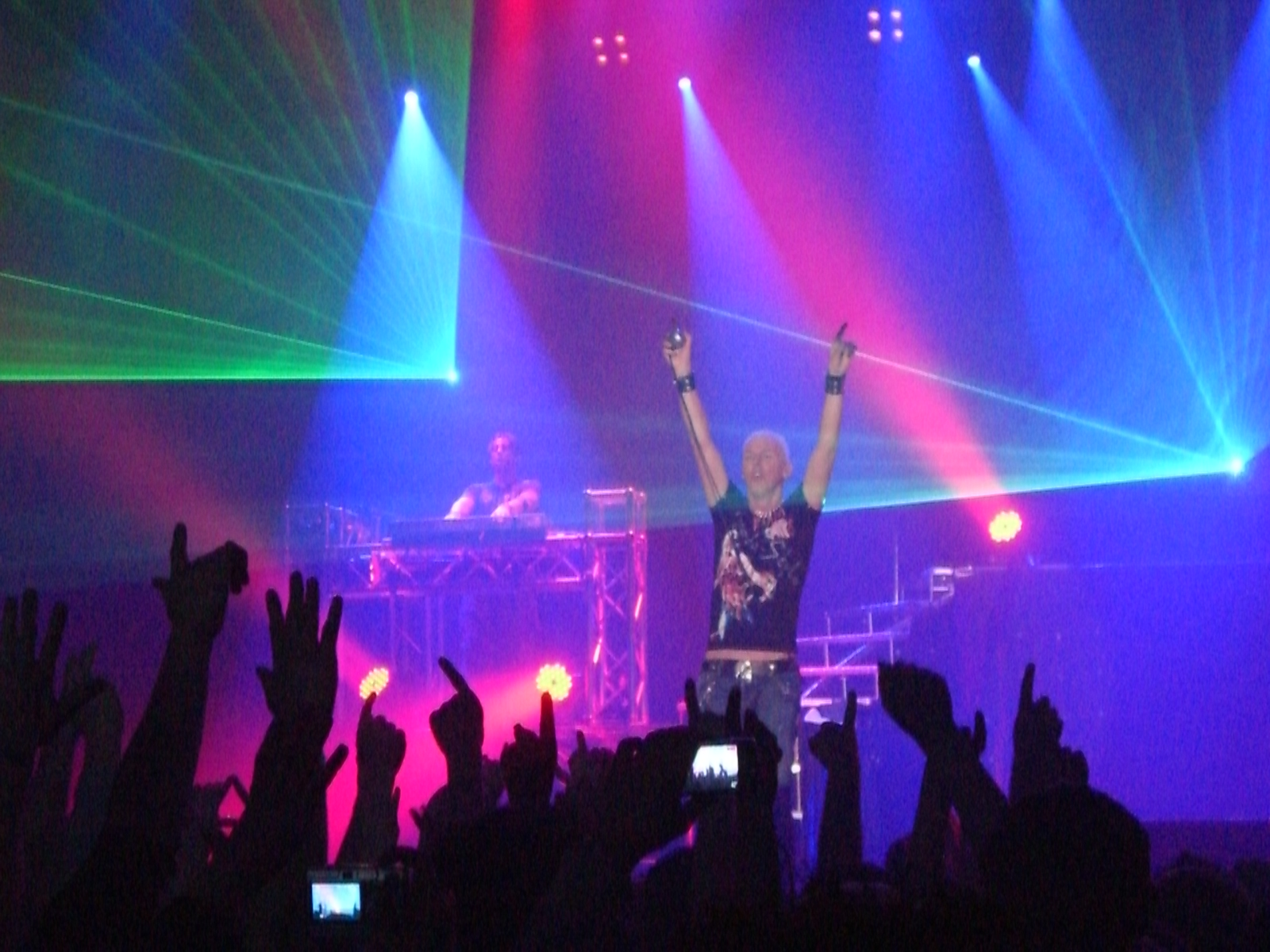
- Scooter on their Jumping All Over the World Tour, at the Zenith in Munich 2008
- Studio albums: 21
- Live albums: 5
- Compilation albums: 5
- Singles: 89
- Video albums: 6
- Music videos: 81

This is the discography of German techno band Scooter. Founded in December 1993 in Hamburg, Scooter is known for being one of the most successful German bands as well as for having sold over 30 million records worldwide. Since 1993, the trio has released 21 studio albums, five compilation albums, five live albums and 89 singles, as well as six video albums and 81 music videos. Scooter, who have gathered 80 gold and platinum awards throughout the years, are composed of H.P. Baxxter, Marc Blou and Jay Frog.

== Albums ==
=== Studio albums ===
List of studio albums, with selected chart positions and certifications
Title	Album details	Peak chart positions										Certifications
Title	Album details	GER	AUT	FIN	HUN	NL	NOR	POL	SWE	SWI	UK	Certifications
... and the Beat Goes On!	Released: 31 January 1995; Label: Club Tools; Formats: CD, LP, Cassette, Digital Download	25	27	—	—	31	18	—	—	29	131	
Our Happy Hardcore	Released: 28 March 1996; Label: Club Tools; Formats: CD, LP, CC, DD	17	16	8	1	54	—	—	31	9	24	
Wicked!	Released: 24 October 1996; Label: Club Tools; Formats: CD, CC, DD	22	30	5	2	—	—	—	33	38	76	ZPAV: Gold
Age of Love	Released: 25 August 1997; Label: Club Tools; Formats: CD, CC, DD	19	32	4	3	—	35	—	26	35	—	IFPI FIN: Gold
No Time to Chill	Released: 20 July 1998; Label: Club Tools; Formats: CD, CC, DD	4	27	1	1	—	28	—	16	20	—	IFPI FIN: Gold; ZPAV: Gold
Back to the Heavyweight Jam	Released: 27 September 1999; Label: Club Tools; Formats: CD, CC, DD	7	—	3	1	—	35	—	5	25	—	BVMI: Gold; IFPI SWE: Gold
Sheffield	Released: 20 July 2000; Label: Sheffield Tunes; Formats: CD, CC, DD	11	49	9	2	—	—	—	15	60	—	
We Bring the Noise!	Released: 11 June 2001; Label: Sheffield Tunes; Formats: CD, DD	15	32	8	3	—	12	—	17	74	—	
The Stadium Techno Experience	Released: 31 March 2003; Label: Sheffield Tunes; Formats: CD, DD, LP	7	14	12	3	28	3	—	4	35	20	BPI: Silver; IFPI NOR: Gold; IFPI SWE: Gold; MAHASZ: Gold
Mind the Gap	Released: 8 November 2004; Label: Sheffield Tunes; Formats: CD, DD	16	34	—	18	83	—	—	44	67	—	MAHASZ: Gold
Who's Got the Last Laugh Now?	Released: 4 November 2005; Label: Sheffield Tunes; Formats: CD, DD	14	31	—	—	—	30	—	—	44	—	
The Ultimate Aural Orgasm	Released: 9 February 2007; Label: Sheffield Tunes; Formats: CD, DD	6	17	25	28	—	—	35	30	66	—	
Jumping All Over the World (Note: The album was re-released as Jumping All Over the World – Whatever You Want on 3 October 2008, including some updated and new material.)	Released: 30 November 2007; Label: Sheffield Tunes; Formats: CD, DD	9	18	—	—	—	—	—	—	65	1	BVMI: Gold; BPI: Platinum
Under the Radar Over the Top	Released: 2 October 2009; Label: Sheffield Tunes; Formats: CD, DD	2	15	—	38	—	—	—	—	51	62	BPI: Gold
The Big Mash Up	Released: 14 October 2011; Label: Sheffield Tunes; Formats: CD, DD	15	30	—	39	—	—	—	—	47	—	
Music for a Big Night Out	Released: 2 November 2012; Label: Sheffield Tunes; Formats: CD, DD	10	37	—	—	—	—	—	—	47	—	
The Fifth Chapter	Released: 26 September 2014; Label: Sheffield Tunes; Formats: CD, LP, DD	8	28	—	30	—	—	—	—	23	—	
Ace	Released: 5 February 2016; Label: Sheffield Tunes; Formats: CD, LP, DD	6	14	—	13	—	—	—	—	34	—	
Scooter Forever	Released: 1 September 2017; Label: Sheffield Tunes; Formats: CD, LP, DD	8	17	—	4	—	—	20	—	32	—	
God Save the Rave	Released: 16 April 2021; Label: Sheffield Tunes; Formats: CD, LP, DD	4	7	—	22	—	—	—	—	12	—	
Open Your Mind and Your Trousers	Released: 22 March 2024; Label: Sheffield Tunes; Formats: CD, LP, DD	2	4	—	—	—	—	—	—	8	—	
"—" denotes a recording that did not chart or was not released in that territory.

=== Compilation albums ===
List of compilation albums, with selected chart positions and certifications
Title	Album details	Peak chart positions										Certifications
Title	Album details	GER	AUS	AUT	FIN	HUN	IRL	NOR	SWE	SWI	UK	Certifications
Rough and Tough and Dangerous – The Singles 94/98	Released: 19 January 1998; Label: Club Tools; Formats: CD, CC, DL	36	—	47	2	—	6	12	18	—	—	IFPI SWE: Gold
Push the Beat for This Jam (The Second Chapter)	Released: 7 January 2002; Label: Sheffield Tunes; Formats: CD, DL	5	39	10	29	10	59	1	2	42	6	BPI: Gold; IFPI NOR: Gold; IFPI SWE: Gold
24 Carat Gold	Released: 4 November 2002; Label: Sheffield Tunes; Formats: CD, DL	49	—	—	—	17	—	—	—	94	—	
20 Years of Hardcore	Released: 11 October 2013; Label: Sheffield Tunes; Formats: CD, DL	37	—	—	—	—	—	—	—	72	—	BVMI: Gold; IFPI DEN: Gold
100% Scooter – 25 Years Wild & Wicked	Released: 15 December 2017; Label: Sheffield Tunes; Formats: CD, LP, CC, DL	19	—	52	—	29	—	—	—	47	—	
"—" denotes a recording that did not chart or was not released in that territory.

=== Live albums ===
List of live albums, with selected chart positions and certifications
Title	Album details	Peak chart positions									Certifications
Title	Album details	GER	AUT	FRA	HUN	IRL	NL	NOR	SWE	SWI	Certifications
Encore: Live and Direct	Released: 13 May 2002; Label: Sheffield Tunes; Formats: CD, DL	13	25	62	12	28	99	6	53	71	IFPI NOR: Gold
Live: Selected Songs of the 10th Anniversary Concert at Docks, Hamburg	Released: 7 June 2004; Label: Sheffield Tunes; Formats: CD, (Note: Released on CD as part of the Deluxe Version of Mind the Gap (CD2).) DL	—	—	—	—	—	—	—	—	—	
Excess All Areas	Released: 2 June 2006; Label: Sheffield Tunes; Formats: CD, DL	29	64	—	—	—	—	—	—	—	
Live in Hamburg	Released: 7 May 2010; Label: Sheffield Tunes; Formats: CD, DL	14	—	—	—	—	—	—	—	—	
I Want You to Stream!	Released: 3 April 2020; Label: Sheffield Tunes; Formats: DL	—	—	—	21	—	—	—	—	—	
"—" denotes a recording that did not chart or was not released in that territory.

=== Video albums ===
List of video albums
Title	Album details
Happy Hardcore Clips ...and the Show Goes On!	Released: 25 April 1996; Label: Club Tools; Formats: VHS; Type: Music video compilation
Rough and Tough and Dangerous – The Singles 94/98	Released: 2 January 1998; Label: Club Tools; Formats: VHS; Type: Music video compilation
Encore: The Whole Story (Note: Released under the title 24 Carat Gold in the Netherlands (with the same content).)	Released: 13 May 2002; Label: Sheffield Tunes; Formats: 2×DVD; Type: Live video album + Music video compilation
Excess All Areas	Released: 2 June 2006; Label: Sheffield Tunes; Formats: 2×DVD; Type: Live video album + Music video compilation
Live in Hamburg	Released: 7 May 2010; Label: Sheffield Tunes; Formats: DVD, Blu-ray; Type: Live video album (DVD) + Music video compilation (Blu-ray only)
The Complete Video Collection	Released: 11 October 2013; Label: Sheffield Tunes; Formats: 2×DVD; Type: Music video compilation
FCK 2020 – Zweieinhalb Jahre mit Scooter	Released: 12 January 2023 (cinema premiere), 22 June 2023 (home release); Label: Sheffield Tunes; Formats: DVD, Blu-ray, Ultra HD Blu-ray; Type: Documentary film

==== Video albums that come with a specific edition(s) of a studio album ====
Title	Details
Live in Berlin 2008	Released: 4 October 2008 (within the deluxe and the premium edition (DVD1) of the album Jumping All Over the World – Whatever You Want); Label: Sheffield Tunes; Formats: DVD; Type: Live video album
The Complete Video Collection	Released: 4 October 2008 (within the premium edition (DVD2) of the album Jumping All Over the World – Whatever You Want); Label: Sheffield Tunes; Formats: DVD; Type: Music video compilation
Caught by the Radar	Released: 2 October 2009 (within the limited edition and the fanbox of the album Under the Radar Over the Top); Label: Sheffield Tunes; Formats: DVD; Type: Travelogue + Interview
The Stadium Techno Inferno – Live in Hamburg 2011	Released: 14 October 2011 (within the limited edition and the fanbox of the album The Big Mash Up); Label: Sheffield Tunes; Formats: DVD; Type: Live video album

== Singles ==
=== The First Chapter ===
Title	Year	Peak chart positions										Certifications	Album
Title	Year	GER	AUT	FIN	FRA	IRE	NL	NOR	SWE	SWI	UK	Certifications	Album
"Vallée de Larmes"	1993	—	—	—	—	—	—	—	—	—	—		Non-album single
"Hyper Hyper"	1994	2	2	4	28	23	7	10	26	3	—	BVMI: Platinum; IFPI AUT: Gold	...and the Beat Goes On!
"Move Your Ass!"	1995	3	3	7	11	15	5	6	10	3	23 (Note: "Move Your Ass!", "Friends" and "Endless Summer" were released as the Move Your Ass EP in the UK and Ireland. "Move Your Ass" reached No. 130 on its own.)	BVMI: Gold	...and the Beat Goes On!
"Friends"	1995	3	15	—	—	26	38	—	—	15	23	BVMI: Gold	...and the Beat Goes On!
"Endless Summer"	1995	5	18	13	48	—	36	—	—	11	23	BVMI: Gold	...and the Beat Goes On!
"Back in the U.K."	1995	4	8	17	48	17 (Note: The song was re-recorded as "Back in Ireland" for the Irish market. The re-recorded version reached No. 14 there.)	29	—	39	6	18	BVMI: Gold	Our Happy Hardcore
"Let Me Be Your Valentine"	1996	14	9	—	45	19	—	—	—	23	—		Our Happy Hardcore
"Rebel Yell"	1996	8	7	8	—	23	—	—	42	17	30		Our Happy Hardcore
"I'm Raving"	1996	4	4	2	—	19	44	—	37	13	33	BVMI: Gold	Wicked!
"Break It Up"	1996	15	18	13	—	—	—	—	—	44	83		Wicked!
"Fire"	1997	5	5	1	—	28	—	10	7	11	45	BVMI: Gold; IFPI FIN: Gold	Age of Love
"The Age of Love"	1997	14	21	1	35	—	—	—	20	21	76		Age of Love
"No Fate"	1997	39	36	2	—	—	—	—	35	—	—		Rough and Tough and Dangerous – The Singles 94/98
"—" denotes a recording that did not chart or was not released in that territory.

=== The Second Chapter ===
Title	Year	Peak chart positions										Certifications	Album
Title	Year	GER	AUT	BEL (Fla.)	FIN	IRE	NL	NOR	SWE	SWI	UK	Certifications	Album
"How Much Is the Fish?"	1998	3	9	1	2	—	21	19	23	13	—	BVMI: Gold; BEA: Gold	No Time to Chill
"We Are the Greatest" / "I Was Made for Lovin' You"	1998	26	36	50	—	—	98	—	45	—	—		No Time to Chill
"Call Me Mañana"	1999	16	24	10	7	—	—	—	6	25	—	IFPI SWE: Gold	No Time to Chill
"Faster Harder Scooter"	1999	7	24	17	2	—	—	15	3	20	—	IFPI SWE: Platinum	Back to the Heavyweight Jam
"Fuck the Millennium"	1999	11	15	2	4	—	—	—	3	61	—	IFPI SWE: Gold	Back to the Heavyweight Jam
"I'm Your Pusher"	2000	17	33	— (Note: "I'm Your Pusher" did not enter the Ultratop chart, but peaked at No. 11 on the Ultratip chart.)	19	—	—	—	27	74	—		Sheffield
"She's the Sun"	2000	41	—	—	—	—	—	—	—	—	—		Sheffield
"Posse (I Need You on the Floor)"	2001	7	7	44	20	23	65	—	16	43	15		We Bring the Noise!
"Aiii Shot the DJ"	2001	29	22	—	16	—	—	—	37	98	—		We Bring the Noise!
"Ramp! (The Logical Song)"	2001	7	4	—	11	1	—	1	8	14	2	BVMI: Gold; ARIA: Platinum; BPI: 2× Platinum; IFPI NOR: Platinum	Push the Beat for This Jam (The Second Chapter)
"—" denotes a recording that did not chart or was not released in that territory.

=== The Third Chapter ===
Title	Year	Peak chart positions										Certifications	Album
Title	Year	GER	AUT	DEN	FIN	HUN	NL	NOR	SWE	SWI	UK	Certifications	Album
"Nessaja"	2002	1	2	5	7	10	9	2	21	7	4	BVMI: Gold; BPI: Silver; IFPI NOR: Gold	Encore: Live and Direct
"Weekend!"	2003	2	4	4	7	1	7	3	9	33	12	IFPI NOR: Platinum	The Stadium Techno Experience
"The Night"	2003	10	12	15	14	8	26	—	14	34	16		The Stadium Techno Experience
"Maria (I Like It Loud)" (vs. Marc Acardipane & Dick Rules)	2003	4	1	12	—	2	16	—	21	21	16	BVMI: Platinum; IFPI AUT: Gold	The Stadium Techno Experience
"Jigga Jigga!"	2003	10	9	17	12	3	50	10	24	45	48		Mind the Gap
"Shake That!"	2004	8	12	10	9	1	24	4	12	38	—		Mind the Gap
"One (Always Hardcore)"	2004	7	5	18	9	2	10	—	60	30	—	BVMI: Gold	Mind the Gap
"Suavemente"	2005	22	27	10	—	4	18	—	58	39	—		Mind the Gap
"Hello! (Good to Be Back)"	2005	14	23	—	3	2	43	—	—	36	—		Who's Got the Last Laugh Now?
"Apache Rocks the Bottom!"	2005	24	23	5	2	2	79	—	47	54	—		Who's Got the Last Laugh Now?
"—" denotes a recording that did not chart or was not released in that territory.

=== The Fourth Chapter ===
Title	Year	Peak chart positions										Certifications	Album
Title	Year	GER	AUT	FIN	HUN	IRE	NL	SCO	SWE	SWI	UK	Certifications	Album
"Behind the Cow" (featuring Fatman Scoop)	2007	17	22	3	3	—	54	—	59	78	—		The Ultimate Aural Orgasm
"Lass uns tanzen"	2007	19	41	10	—	—	—	—	—	—	—		The Ultimate Aural Orgasm
"The Question Is What Is the Question?"	2007	5	2	4	4	18	42	11	—	83	49	BVMI: Gold	Jumping All Over the World
"And No Matches"	2007	9	20	—	—	—	62	—	—	—	—		Jumping All Over the World
"Jumping All Over the World"	2008	15	23	—	—	10	—	9	—	—	28	BPI: Gold	Jumping All Over the World
"I'm Lonely"	2008	8	20	—	—	—	—	—	—	—	—		Jumping All Over the World
"Jump That Rock (Whatever You Want)" (vs. Status Quo)	2008	11	19	—	6	—	91	12	—	79	57		Jumping All Over the World – Whatever You Want
"J'adore Hardcore"	2009	12	16	—	6	—	—	83	—	90	170		Under the Radar Over the Top
"Ti sento"	2009	10	27	—	5	—	—	—	—	45	—		Under the Radar Over the Top
"The Sound Above My Hair"	2009	38	74	—	—	—	—	—	—	—	—		Under the Radar Over the Top
"Stuck on Replay"	2010	34	58	—	—	—	—	—	—	—	—		Under the Radar Over the Top
"Friends Turbo"	2011	43	65	—	—	—	—	—	—	—	—		The Big Mash Up
"The Only One"	2011	45	20	—	—	—	—	—	—	—	—		The Big Mash Up
"David Doesn't Eat"	2011	67	—	—	—	—	—	—	—	—	—		The Big Mash Up
"C'est Bleu" (featuring Vicky Leandros)	2011	77	—	—	—	—	—	—	—	—	—		The Big Mash Up
"It's a Biz (Ain't Nobody)"	2012	79	—	—	—	—	—	—	—	—	—		The Big Mash Up
"4 A.M."	2012	96	—	29 (Note: "4 A.M." reached number 29 only on the Download chart as it was the first digital single released by Scooter.)	—	—	—	84	—	—	177		Music for a Big Night Out
"Army of Hardcore"	2012	77	—	—	—	—	—	—	—	—	—		Music for a Big Night Out
"—" denotes a recording that did not chart or was not released in that territory.

=== The Fifth Chapter ===
Title	Year	Peak chart positions						Album
Title	Year	GER	AUT	BEL (Wal.)	FIN Down.	FRA	HUN Down.	Album
"Bigroom Blitz" (featuring Wiz Khalifa)	2014	43	63	— (Note: "Bigroom Blitz!" did not enter the Ultratop chart, but peaked at No. 40 on the Ultratip chart.)	—	79	—	The Fifth Chapter
"Today" (with Vassy)	2014	75	—	—	—	—	—	The Fifth Chapter
"Can't Stop the Hardcore"	2014	—	—	—	—	—	—	The Fifth Chapter
"Radiate" (with Vassy)	2015	—	—	— (Note: "Radiate" did not enter the Ultratop chart, but peaked at No. 8 on the Ultratip chart.)	—	—	—	The Fifth Chapter
"Riot"	2015	—	—	—	—	—	16	Ace
"Oi"	2016	—	—	—	—	—	19	Ace
"Mary Got No Lamb"	2016	—	—	—	—	—	—	Ace
"Bora! Bora! Bora!"	2017	—	—	—	16	—	7	Scooter Forever
"My Gabber" (with Jebroer)	2017	—	—	—	—	—	—	Scooter Forever
"In Rave We Trust – Amateur Hour (Anthem Mix)"	2017	—	—	—	—	—	37	Scooter Forever
"In Rave We Trust – Amateur Hour (Anthem Mix)"	2017	—	—	—	—	—	37	100% Scooter – 25 Years Wild & Wicked
"—" denotes a recording that did not chart or was not released in that territory.

=== The Sixth Chapter ===
Title	Year	Peak chart positions						Certifications	Album
Title	Year	GER	HUN Down.	NL	SCO Sales	UK Sales	UK Down.	Certifications	Album
"Rave Teacher (Somebody Like Me)" (with Xillions)	2019	—	2	—	—	—	—		God Save the Rave
"God Save the Rave" (with Harris & Ford)	2019	—	2	—	—	—	—	BVMI: Gold; IFPI AUT: Gold	God Save the Rave
"Devil's Symphony"	2019	—	3	—	—	—	—		God Save the Rave
"Which Light Switch Is Which?"	2019	—	4	—	—	—	—		God Save the Rave
"Bassdrum" (with Finch Asozial)	2020	24	6	—	—	—	—		God Save the Rave
"FCK 2020"	2020	82	2	— (Note: "FCK 2020" did not enter the Dutch Top 40, but peaked at No. 16 on the Tipparade chart.)	49	74	65		God Save the Rave
"Paul Is Dead" (with Timmy Trumpet)	2020	— (Note: "Paul Is Dead" did not enter the German Singles Chart, but peaked at number 7 on the Deutsche Single Trend Chart.)	14	—	—	—	—		God Save the Rave
"We Love Hardcore" (with Dimitri Vegas & Like Mike)	2021	—	16	—	—	—	—		God Save the Rave
"Groundhog Day"	2021	—	—	—	—	—	—		God Save the Rave
"Rave Witchers" (with Finch)	2021	18	—	—	—	—	—		Rummelbums
"The Spell Remains"	2022	—	18	—	—	—	—		Non-album singles
"Do Not Sit If You Can Dance"	2022	—	16	—	—	—	—		Non-album singles
"—" denotes a recording that did not chart or was not released in that territory.

=== The Seventh Chapter ===
Title	Year	Peak chart positions				Album
Title	Year	GER	HUN Down.	UK Sales	UK Down.	Album
"Waste Your Youth"	2023	—	7	—	—	Open Your Mind and Your Trousers
"Techno Is Back" (with Harris & Ford)	2023	— (Note: "Techno Is Back" did not enter the German Singles Chart, but peaked at number 8 on the Deutsche Single Trend Chart.)	4	28	27	Open Your Mind and Your Trousers
"Hyper Hyper" (with Giuseppe Ottaviani)	2023	—	12	—	—	Non-album single
"Constellations"	2023	—	9	—	—	Open Your Mind and Your Trousers
"For Those About to Rave" (with Timmy Trumpet)	2023	—	—	—	—	Open Your Mind and Your Trousers
"Berliner Luft"	2023	—	—	—	—	Open Your Mind and Your Trousers
"Rave & Shout" (with Harris & Ford)	2023	—	—	—	—	Open Your Mind and Your Trousers
"I Keep Hearing Bingo"	2024	—	—	—	—	Open Your Mind and Your Trousers
"Let's Do It Again"	2024	—	—	—	—	Open Your Mind and Your Trousers
"Posse Reloaded" (with Finch)	2024	—	—	—	—	Open Your Mind and Your Trousers
"Mom Was on Tequila" (with Reinier Zonneveld)	2024	—	—	—	—	TBA
"Gimme That Noise" (with Harris & Ford and Shibui)	2025	—	—	—	—	TBA
"Heart Attack" (with Blasterjaxx and Cer3s)	2025	—	—	—	—	TBA
"Luv U More" (with Paul Elstak and Joost)	2025	—	—	—	—	TBA
"Stuff the Turkey"	2025	—	—	—	—	TBA
"Rave from Outer Space" (with W&W)	2026	—	—	—	—	TBA
"No Rewind"	2026	—	—	—	—	TBA
"—" denotes a recording that did not chart or was not released in that territory.

== Other appearances ==
Title	Year	Album
"Troy"	2009	A Tribute to Die Fantastischen Vier
"1" (with Joost)	2025	Unity

== Remixes ==
Title	Year	Artist(s)
"Living Without Your Love" (Scooter Remix)	1995	Interactive
"Do the Right Thing" (Scooter Remix)	1995	Shahin & Simon
"Check Your Head" (Scooter Remix)	1995	Ultra-Sonic
"Win the Race" (Scooter Remix)	2001	Modern Talking
"Sunrise (Here I Am)" (Scooter Remix)	2002	Ratty
"Am Fenster" (Scooter Remix)	2003	Power from the Eastside
"Help! Asia" (Scooter Remix)	2005	Dance United
"Jittery Heritage" (Scooter Remix)	2005	Einmusik
"Uhn Tiss Uhn Tiss Uhn Tiss" (The Scooter Remix)	2005	Bloodhound Gang
"Remmidemmi (Yippie Yippie Yeah)" (Scooter Remix)	2006	Deichkind
"3 Tage wach" (Scooter Remix)	2008	Lützenkirchen
"I See U" (Scooter Remix)	2008	Maximum Spell
"Discolights" (Scooter Remix)	2008	Ultrabeat vs. Darren Styles
"Pussy" (Lick It Remix) by Scooter	2010	Rammstein
"Sinéad" (Scooter Remix)	2011	Within Temptation
"Helmut Kohl" (Scooter Remix)	2013	Susanne Blech
"Gentleman of the Year" (Scooter Remix)	2014	Beatsteaks
"Never be Lonely" (Scooter Remix)	2024	Jax Jones, Zoe Wees
"Angel of My Dreams" (Scooter Remix)	2024	Jade

== Charity projects ==
=== Singles ===
Title	Year	Peak chart positions									
Title	Year	GER	AUT	FIN	NL	NOR	SCO	SWE	SWI	UK	US
"Love Message" (as Love Message)	1996	4	12	9	—	—	—	46	12	—	—
"Let the Music Heal Your Soul" (as Bravo All Stars)	1998	6	22	—	24	4	35	—	5	36	60
"Reach Out" (as Dance United)	2002	27	—	—	—	—	—	—	—	—	—
"Help! Asia" (as Dance United)	2005	43	—	—	—	—	—	—	—	—	—
"—" denotes a recording that did not chart or was not released in that territory.

== Music videos ==
List of music videos, showing year released
Title	Year
"Hyper Hyper"	1994
"Move Your Ass!"	1995
"Friends"	1995
"Endless Summer"	1995
"Back in the U.K."	1995
"Let Me be Your Valentine"	1996
"Rebel Yell"	1996
"I'm Raving"	1996
"Break It Up"	1996
"Fire"	1997
"The Age of Love"	1997
"No Fate"	1997
"How Much is the Fish?"	1998
"We are the Greatest"	1998
"I Was Made for Lovin' You"	1998
"Call Me Mañana"	1999
"Faster Harder Scooter"	1999
"Fuck the Millennium"	1999
"I'm Your Pusher"	2000
"She's the Sun"	2000
"Posse (I Need You on the Floor)"	2001
"Aiii Shot the DJ"	2001
"Ramp! (The Logical Song)"	2001
"Nessaja"	2002
"Weekend!"	2003
"The Night"	2003
"Maria (I Like It Loud)" (vs. Marc Acardipane & Dick Rules)	2003
"Jigga Jigga!"	2003
"Shake That!"	2004
"One (Always Hardcore)"	2004
"Suavemente"	2005
"Hello! (Good to be Back)"	2005
"Apache Rocks the Bottom!"	2005
"Behind the Cow" (featuring Fatman Scoop)	2007
"Lass uns Tanzen"	2007
"The Question is What is the Question?"	2007
"And No Matches"	2007
"Jumping All Over the World"	2008
"I'm Lonely"	2008
"Jump That Rock (Whatever You Want)" (vs. Status Quo)	2008
"J'adore Hardcore"	2009
"Ti sento"	2009
"The Sound Above My Hair"	2009
"Stuck on Replay"	2010
"Friends Turbo"	2011
"The Only One"	2011
"David Doesn't Eat"	2011
"C'est Bleu" (featuring Vicky Leandros)	2011
"It's a Biz (Ain't Nobody)"	2012
"4 A.M."	2012
"Army of Hardcore"	2012
"Bigroom Blitz" (featuring Wiz Khalifa)	2014
"Today" (with Vassy)	2014
"999 (Call the Police)"	2014
"Can't Stop the Hardcore"	2014
"Radiate" (with Vassy)	2015
"Riot" (360° Live Video)	2015
"Oi"	2016
"Mary Got No Lamb"	2016
"Bora! Bora! Bora!"	2017
"My Gabber" (with Jebroer)	2017
"In Rave We Trust – Amateur Hour (Anthem Mix)"	2017
"Move Your Ass! (Noisecontrollers Remix)" (Tour Recap)	2019
"Rave Teacher (Somebody Like Me)" (with Xillions)	2019
"God Save the Rave" (with Harris & Ford)	2019
"Devil's Symphony" (Lyric Video)	2019
"Which Light Switch is Which?"	2019
"Bassdrum" (with Finch Asozial)	2020
"FCK 2020"	2020
"Paul is Dead" (with Timmy Trumpet)	2020
"We Love Hardcore" (with Dimitri Vegas & Like Mike)	2021
"Groundhog Day"	2021
"Rave Witchers" (with FiNCH)	2021
"The Spell Remains"	2022
"Do Not Sit If You Can Dance"	2022
"Waste Your Youth" (Lyric Video)	2023
"Techno is Back" (with Harris & Ford)	2023
"Constellations" (Lyric Video)	2023
"For Those About to Rave" (with Timmy Trumpet)	2023
"Berliner Luft"	2023
"Rave & Shout" (Lyric Video) (with Harris & Ford)	2023
"Let's Do It Again" (Lyric Video)	2024
"Posse Reloaded" (with FiNCH)	2024
"Gimme That Noise" (with Harris & Ford and Shibui)	2025
"Heart Attack" (with Blasterjaxx and Cer3s)	2025
"Luv U More" (with Paul Elstak and Joost)	2025
"Rave from Outer Space" (with W&W)	2026
"No Rewind"	2026

== Tribute projects ==
=== Albums ===
List of tribute albums
Title	Album details	Artist(s)
Hands on Scooter (Note: Part of the album (8 tracks of 12) was previously released on the reissue of Jumping All Over the World – Whatever You Want.)	Released: 23 January 2009; Label: Sheffield Tunes; Formats: CD, CC, (Note: Part of the album was released on cassette within the deluxe box of 100% Scooter – 25 Years Wild & Wicked.) DL	Various
100% Scooter – Piano Only	Released: 15 December 2017; Label: Sheffield Tunes Classics; Formats: CD, LP, (Note: Released on LP as part of the deluxe box of 100% Scooter – 25 Years Wild & Wicked.) DL	Olga Scheps

=== Singles ===
List of tribute singles, with selected chart positions
Title	Year	Artist(s)	Peak chart positions			Album
Title	Year	Artist(s)	GER	AUT	SWI	Album
"Beweg dein Arsch"	2009	Sido's Hands on Scooter feat. Kitty Kat & Tony D	17	34	100	Hands on Scooter
"How Much Is the Fish?"	2017	Olga Scheps	—	—	—	100% Scooter – Piano Only
"—" denotes a recording that did not chart or was not released in that territory.

=== Music videos ===
List of tribute music videos
Title	Year	Artist(s)
"Beweg dein Arsch"	2009	Sido's Hands on Scooter feat. Kitty Kat & Tony D
"Was kostet der Fisch?"	2009	K.I.Z's Hands on Scooter
"How Much is the Fish?"	2017	Olga Scheps
"Maria (I Like It Loud)"	2017	Olga Scheps
