= 20 Years of Hardcore =

2013 compilation album by Scooter

Compilation album by Scooter
- Released: 11 October 2013
- Recorded: 1993–2013
- Studio: The Ambience Studio (Hanover, Germany, 1993–1995); Loop Dance Constructions Studios (Hamburg, Germany, 1995–2005); Sheffield Underground Studios (Hamburg, Germany, 2006–2012); Plazmatek Studio (Cologne, Germany, 2013)
- Length: 160:07 (CD); 192:18 (Web)
- Label: Sheffield Tunes
- Producer: Scooter

Scooter chronology
Music for a Big Night Out (2012)	20 Years of Hardcore (2013)	The Fifth Chapter (2014)

Singles from 20 Years of Hardcore
- 1. "Maria (I Like It Loud) (R.I.O. Remix)" Released: 27 September 2013

The Complete Video Collection

Video by Scooter
- Released: 11 October 2013
- Recorded: 1994–2012
- Label: Sheffield Tunes

Scooter video chronology
Live in Hamburg (2010)	The Complete Video Collection (2013)

20 Years of Hardcore is the singles collection album by German hard dance band Scooter, released on 11 October 2013. It collects all the singles from the band to date, plus the remix of "Maria (I Like It Loud)" from the German DJ-duo R.I.O.

== Track listing ==
Audio Compilation CD1
No.	Title	Writer(s)	Length
1.	"Nessaja"	Peter Maffay, Rolf Zuckowski	3:30
2.	"How Much Is the Fish?"	H.P. Baxxter, Rick J. Jordan, Axel Coon, Jens Thele	3:48
3.	"Army of Hardcore"	Massimiliano Monopoli, Jeroen Streunding	2:59
4.	"Move Your Ass!"	Baxxter, Jordan, Ferris Bueller, Thele	3:57
5.	"Maria (I Like It Loud)" (vs. Marc Acardipane & Dick Rules)	Baxxter, Jordan, Jay Frog, Thele, Marc Acardipane, Shawn Mierez	3:44
6.	"Weekend!"	Gerard Koerts, Baxxter, Jordan, Frog, Thele	3:38
7.	"The Question Is What Is the Question?"	Harry van Hoof, Hans van Hemert, Baxxter, Jordan, Michael Simon, Thele	3:48
8.	"Friends"	Baxxter, Jordan, Bueller, Thele	3:50
9.	"The Only One"	Baxxter, Jordan, Chris Avantgrade, Simon, Thele, Jon Baker, Martin Blunt, Jon Brookes, Tim Burgess, Mark Collins	3:34
10.	"Hyper Hyper"	Baxxter, Jordan, Bueller, Thele	3:34
11.	"J'adore Hardcore"	Alessandro Neri, Marco Baroni, Domenico Canu, Sergio Della Monica, Simon Anthony Duffy, Baxxter, Jordan, Simon, Thele	3:50
12.	"4 A.M."	Beverley Craven, Baxxter, Jordan, Simon, Thele	3:20
13.	"I'm Lonely"	Jef Martens, Baxxter, Jordan, Simon, Thele	3:33
14.	"One (Always Hardcore)"	Jeroen Streunding, Baxxter, Jordan, Frog, Thele	3:52
15.	"Ramp! (The Logical Song)"	Rick Davies, Roger Hodgson	3:56
16.	"Ti sento"	Carlo Marrale, Sergio Cossu Carrabetta, Salvatore Stellita	3:57
17.	"Faster Harder Scooter"	Baxxter, Jordan, Coon, Thele	3:49
18.	"Posse (I Need You on the Floor)"	Baxxter, Jordan, Coon, Thele	3:53
19.	"Jigga Jigga!"	Baxxter, Jordan, Frog, Thele	3:55
20.	"Jump That Rock (Whatever You Want)" (vs. Status Quo)	Rick Parfitt, Andy Bown, Baxxter, Jordan, Simon, Thele	3:24
21.	"Endless Summer"	Baxxter, Jordan, Bueller, Thele	3:47
22.	"Maria (I Like It Loud) (R.I.O. Radio Edit)"	Baxxter, Jordan, Frog, Thele, Acardipane, Mierez	3:20
Total length:			1:20:58

CD2
No.	Title	Writer(s)	Length
1.	"Fire"	Baxxter, Jordan, Bueller, Thele	3:33
2.	"Call Me Mañana"	Baxxter, Jordan, Coon, Thele	3:42
3.	"Fuck the Millennium"	Baxxter, Jordan, Coon, Thele, Norman Petty, Richard Stephens, Jimmy Torres	4:13
4.	"The Night"	Lino Nicolosi, Barbara Addoms, Baxxter, Jordan, Frog, Thele	3:25
5.	"Jumping All Over the World"	Georg Kajanus, Baxxter, Jordan, Simon, Thele	3:48
6.	"Aiii Shot the DJ"	Baxxter, Jordan, Coon, Thele	3:32
7.	"I'm Raving"	Marc Cohn	3:38
8.	"Shake That!"	Harry Wayne Casey, Richard Raymond Finch, Baxxter, Jordan, Frog, Thele	3:18
9.	"David Doesn't Eat"	Nicholas Charles Bailey, Baxxter, Jordan, Simon, Thele	3:39
10.	"Behind the Cow"	Baxxter, Jordan, Simon, Thele, Fatman Scoop	3:36
11.	"Break It Up"	Nosie Katzmann	3:40
12.	"The Age of Love"	Baxxter, Jordan, Bueller, Thele	3:52
13.	"Back in the U.K."	Baxxter, Jordan, Bueller, Thele	3:26
14.	"No Fate"	Steffen Britzke, Matthias Hoffmann, René Swain, Baxxter, Jordan, Bueller, Thele	3:43
15.	"Apache Rocks the Bottom!"	Jerry Lordan, Baxxter, Jordan, Frog, Thele	3:47
16.	"The Sound Above My Hair"	Colin Vearncombe	3:37
17.	"C'est Bleu" (feat. Vicky Leandros)	Charles Jean Popp, Pierre Cour, Baxxter, Jordan, Simon, Thele	3:13
18.	"We Are The Greatest"	Baxxter, Jordan, Coon, Thele	3:29
19.	"Hello! (Good to Be Back)"	Gary Glitter, Mike Leander, Baxxter, Jordan, Frog, Thele	3:31
20.	"Rebel Yell"	Billy Idol, Steve Stevens	3:42
21.	"Stuck on Replay"	Lionel B. Richie Jr., Baxxter, Jordan, Simon, Thele	3:11
22.	"And No Matches"	Baxxter, Jordan, Simon, Thele, Emilia, Yogi	3:32
Total length:			1:19:09

Download version
No.	Title	Writer(s)	Length
1.	"Nessaja"	Peter Maffay, Rolf Zuckowski	3:28
2.	"How Much Is the Fish?"	H.P. Baxxter, Rick J. Jordan, Axel Coon, Jens Thele	3:46
3.	"Army of Hardcore"	Massimiliano Monopoli, Jeroen Streunding	2:57
4.	"Move Your Ass!"	Baxxter, Jordan, Ferris Bueller, Thele	3:55
5.	"Maria (I Like It Loud)" (vs. Marc Acardipane & Dick Rules)	Baxxter, Jordan, Jay Frog, Thele, Marc Acardipane, Shawn Mierez	3:42
6.	"Maria (I Like It Loud) (R.I.O. Radio Edit)"	Baxxter, Jordan, Frog, Thele, Acardipane, Mierez	3:19
7.	"Weekend!"	Gerard Koerts, Baxxter, Jordan, Frog, Thele	3:36
8.	"The Question Is What Is the Question?"	Harry van Hoof, Hans van Hemert, Baxxter, Jordan, Michael Simon, Thele	3:46
9.	"Friends"	Baxxter, Jordan, Bueller, Thele	3:48
10.	"The Only One"	Baxxter, Jordan, Chris Avantgrade, Simon, Thele, Jon Baker, Martin Blunt, Jon Brookes, Tim Burgess, Mark Collins	3:32
11.	"Hyper Hyper"	Baxxter, Jordan, Bueller, Thele	3:32
12.	"J'adore Hardcore"	Alessandro Neri, Marco Baroni, Domenico Canu, Sergio Della Monica, Simon Anthony Duffy, Baxxter, Jordan, Simon, Thele	3:48
13.	"4 A.M."	Beverley Craven, Baxxter, Jordan, Simon, Thele	3:17
14.	"I'm Lonely"	Jef Martens, Baxxter, Jordan, Simon, Thele	3:31
15.	"One (Always Hardcore)"	Jeroen Streunding, Baxxter, Jordan, Frog, Thele	3:50
16.	"Ramp! (The Logical Song)"	Rick Davies, Roger Hodgson	3:54
17.	"Ti sento"	Carlo Marrale, Sergio Cossu Carrabetta, Salvatore Stellita	3:55
18.	"Faster Harder Scooter"	Baxxter, Jordan, Coon, Thele	3:48
19.	"It's a Biz (Ain't Nobody)"	David Wolinski	3:22
20.	"Posse (I Need You on the Floor)"	Baxxter, Jordan, Coon, Thele	3:51
21.	"Jigga Jigga!"	Baxxter, Jordan, Frog, Thele	3:53
22.	"Jump That Rock (Whatever You Want)" (vs. Status Quo)	Rick Parfitt, Andy Bown, Baxxter, Jordan, Simon, Thele	3:22
23.	"Endless Summer"	Baxxter, Jordan, Bueller, Thele	3:44
24.	"The Night"	Lino Nicolosi, Barbara Addoms, Baxxter, Jordan, Frog, Thele	3:23
25.	"Lass uns tanzen"	Baxxter, Jordan, Simon, Thele	3:43
26.	"Shake That!"	Harry Wayne Casey, Richard Raymond Finch, Baxxter, Jordan, Frog, Thele	3:16
27.	"Fire"	Baxxter, Jordan, Bueller, Thele	3:31
28.	"Call Me Mañana"	Baxxter, Jordan, Coon, Thele	3:40
29.	"Fuck the Millennium"	Baxxter, Jordan, Coon, Thele, Norman Petty, Richard Stephens, Jimmy Torres	4:11
30.	"Jumping All Over the World"	Georg Kajanus, Baxxter, Jordan, Simon, Thele	3:46
31.	"Aiii Shot the DJ"	Baxxter, Jordan, Coon, Thele	3:30
32.	"I'm Raving"	Marc Cohn	3:36
33.	"David Doesn't Eat"	Nicholas Charles Bailey, Baxxter, Jordan, Simon, Thele	3:37
34.	"Behind the Cow"	Baxxter, Jordan, Simon, Thele, Fatman Scoop	3:34
35.	"Friends Turbo"	Baxxter, Jordan, Bueller, Thele	3:21
36.	"Break It Up"	Nosie Katzmann	3:38
37.	"Suavemente"	Elvis Crespo	3:37
38.	"Let Me Be Your Valentine"	Baxxter, Jordan, Bueller, Thele	3:50
39.	"She's the Sun"	Baxxter, Jordan, Coon, Thele	3:49
40.	"The Age of Love"	Baxxter, Jordan, Bueller, Thele	3:50
41.	"Back in the U.K."	Baxxter, Jordan, Bueller, Thele	3:24
42.	"No Fate"	Steffen Britzke, Matthias Hoffmann, René Swain, Baxxter, Jordan, Bueller, Thele	3:41
43.	"Apache Rocks the Bottom!"	Jerry Lordan, Baxxter, Jordan, Frog, Thele	3:45
44.	"The Sound Above My Hair"	Colin Vearncombe	3:35
45.	"C'est Bleu" (feat. Vicky Leandros)	Charles Jean Popp, Pierre Cour, Baxxter, Jordan, Simon, Thele	3:11
46.	"I'm Your Pusher"	Baxxter, Jordan, Coon, Thele, Allan Gray, Walter Reisch	3:49
47.	"We Are The Greatest"	Baxxter, Jordan, Coon, Thele	3:27
48.	"I Was Made For Lovin' You"	Paul Stanley, Desmond Child, Vini Poncia	3:33
49.	"Hello! (Good to Be Back)"	Gary Glitter, Mike Leander, Baxxter, Jordan, Frog, Thele	3:29
50.	"Rebel Yell"	Billy Idol, Steve Stevens	3:40
51.	"Stuck on Replay"	Lionel B. Richie Jr., Baxxter, Jordan, Simon, Thele	3:09
52.	"And No Matches"	Baxxter, Jordan, Simon, Thele, Emilia, Yogi	3:32
53.	"Vallée de Larmes"	DJ Zki & Dobre	4:35
Total length:			3:12:18

Video Compilation DVD1
No.	Title	Length
1.	"Nessaja"	3:30
2.	"How Much Is the Fish?"	3:48
3.	"Army of Hardcore"	2:59
4.	"Move Your Ass!"	3:57
5.	"Maria (I Like It Loud)" (vs. Marc Acardipane & Dick Rules)	3:44
6.	"Weekend!"	3:38
7.	"The Question Is What Is the Question?"	3:48
8.	"Friends"	3:50
9.	"The Only One"	3:34
10.	"Hyper Hyper"	3:34
11.	"J'adore Hardcore"	3:50
12.	"4 A.M."	3:20
13.	"I'm Lonely"	3:33
14.	"One (Always Hardcore)"	3:52
15.	"Ramp! (The Logical Song)"	3:56
16.	"Ti sento"	3:57
17.	"Faster Harder Scooter"	3:49
18.	"It's a Biz (Ain't Nobody)"	3:22
19.	"Posse (I Need You on the Floor)"	3:53
20.	"Jigga Jigga!"	3:55
21.	"Jump That Rock (Whatever You Want)" (vs. Status Quo)	3:24
22.	"Endless Summer"	3:47
23.	"The Night"	3:25
24.	"Lass uns tanzen"	3:43
25.	"Shake That!"	3:18

DVD2
No.	Title	Length
1.	"Fire"	3:33
2.	"Call Me Mañana"	3:42
3.	"Fuck the Millennium"	4:13
4.	"Jumping All Over the World"	3:48
5.	"Aiii Shot the DJ"	3:32
6.	"I'm Raving"	3:38
7.	"David Doesn't Eat"	3:39
8.	"Behind the Cow"	3:36
9.	"Friends Turbo"	3:21
10.	"Break It Up"	3:40
11.	"Suavemente"	3:37
12.	"Let Me Be Your Valentine"	3:50
13.	"She's the Sun"	3:49
14.	"The Age of Love"	3:52
15.	"Back in the U.K."	3:26
16.	"No Fate"	3:43
17.	"Apache Rocks the Bottom!"	3:47
18.	"The Sound Above My Hair"	3:37
19.	"C'est Bleu" (feat. Vicky Leandros)	3:13
20.	"I'm Your Pusher"	3:49
21.	"We Are The Greatest"	3:29
22.	"I Was Made For Lovin' You"	3:33
23.	"Hello! (Good to Be Back)"	3:31
24.	"Rebel Yell"	3:42
25.	"Stuck on Replay"	3:11
26.	"And No Matches"	3:32

== Charts ==
Chart (2013–2014)	Peak position
Czech Albums (ČNS IFPI)	41
German Albums (Offizielle Top 100)	37
Swiss Albums (Schweizer Hitparade)	72

== Certifications and sales ==
Region	Certification	Certified units/sales
Denmark (IFPI Danmark)	Gold	10,000^{‡}
Germany (BVMI)	Gold	100,000^{^}
^{^} Shipments figures based on certification alone.^{‡} Sales+streaming figures based on certification alone.

== Release history ==
List of release dates, showing country, record label and format
Region	Date	Label	Format
Germany	October 11, 2013	Sheffield Tunes	CD, digital download
Czech Republic	October 11, 2013	Universal Music Group	CD, digital download
Russia	October 11, 2013	Warner Music Russia	CD, digital download
