= 100% Scooter – 25 Years Wild & Wicked =

2017 compilation album by Scooter

Compilation album by Scooter
- Released: 15 December 2017
- Recorded: 1993–2017
- Studio: The Ambience Studio (Hanover, Germany, 1993–1995); Loop Dance Constructions Studios (Hamburg, Germany, 1995–2005); Sheffield Underground Studios (Hamburg, Germany, 2006–2017)
- Label: Sheffield Tunes; Kontor
- Producer: Scooter

Scooter chronology
Scooter Forever (2017)	100% Scooter – 25 Years Wild & Wicked (2017)	God Save the Rave (2021)

100% Scooter – 25 Years Wild & Wicked is a compilation album and a box set by German dance group Scooter, released on 15 December 2017 through Sheffield Tunes and Kontor Records.

== Track listing ==
=== 3-disc version ===
Disc 1
No.	Title	Writer(s)	Length
1.	"Ramp! (The Logical Song)"	Rick Davies, Roger Hodgson	3:54
2.	"How Much Is the Fish?"	H.P. Baxxter, Rick J. Jordan, Axel Coon, Jens Thele	3:46
3.	"One (Always Hardcore)"	Jeroen Streunding, Baxxter, Jordan, Jay Frog, Thele	3:50
4.	"Move Your Ass!"	Baxxter, Jordan, Ferris Bueller, Thele	3:55
5.	"Friends"	Baxxter, Jordan, Bueller, Thele	3:48
6.	"Hyper Hyper"	Baxxter, Jordan, Bueller, Thele	3:32
7.	"Call Me Mañana"	Baxxter, Jordan, Coon, Thele	3:40
8.	"Fuck the Millennium"	Baxxter, Jordan, Coon, Thele, Norman Petty, Richard Stephens, Jimmy Torres	4:11
9.	"Back in the U.K."	Baxxter, Jordan, Bueller, Thele	3:24
10.	"No Fate"	Steffen Britzke, Matthias Hoffmann, René Swain, Baxxter, Jordan, Bueller, Thele	3:41
11.	"Jumping All Over the World"	Georg Kajanus, Baxxter, Jordan, Michael Simon, Thele	3:46
12.	"The Age of Love"	Baxxter, Jordan, Bueller, Thele	3:50
13.	"Aiii Shot the DJ"	Baxxter, Jordan, Coon, Thele	3:30
14.	"J'adore Hardcore"	Alessandro Neri, Marco Baroni, Domenico Canu, Sergio Della Monica, Simon Anthony Duffy, Baxxter, Jordan, Simon, Thele	3:48
15.	"4 A.M."	Beverley Craven, Baxxter, Jordan, Simon, Thele	3:17
16.	"I'm Lonely"	Jef Martens, Baxxter, Jordan, Simon, Thele	3:31
17.	"Army of Hardcore"	Massimiliano Monopoli, Jeroen Streunding	2:57
18.	"We Are the Greatest"	Baxxter, Jordan, Coon, Thele	3:27
19.	"Can't Stop the Hardcore"	Leo Caerts, Leo Rozenstraten	3:34
20.	"I'm Your Pusher"	Baxxter, Jordan, Coon, Thele, Allan Gray, Walter Reisch	3:49
21.	"In Rave We Trust – Amateur Hour" (Anthem Mix)	Ron Mael, Russell Mael	3:16

Disc 2
No.	Title	Writer(s)	Length
1.	"Nessaja"	Peter Maffay, Rolf Zuckowski	3:28
2.	"Maria (I Like It Loud)" (vs. Marc Acardipane & Dick Rules)	Baxxter, Jordan, Frog, Thele, Marc Acardipane, Shawn Mierez	3:42
3.	"The Question Is What Is the Question?"	Harry van Hoof, Hans van Hemert, Baxxter, Jordan, Simon, Thele	3:46
4.	"Weekend!"	Gerard Koerts, Baxxter, Jordan, Frog, Thele	3:36
5.	"Mary Got No Lamb"	Ian George Sutherland	3:26
6.	"Bigroom Blitz"	Baxxter, Phil Speiser, Simon, Thele, Franz Henig, Stephen Singer, Cosmo Hickox	3:06
7.	"Faster Harder Scooter"	Baxxter, Jordan, Coon, Thele	3:48
8.	"I'm Raving"	Marc Cohn	3:36
9.	"Posse (I Need You on the Floor)"	Baxxter, Jordan, Coon, Thele	3:51
10.	"Rebel Yell"	Billy Idol, Steve Stevens	3:40
11.	"Jigga Jigga!"	Baxxter, Jordan, Frog, Thele	3:53
12.	"Apache Rocks the Bottom!"	Jerry Lordan, Baxxter, Jordan, Frog, Thele	3:45
13.	"The Sound Above My Hair"	Colin Vearncombe	3:35
14.	"999 (Call the Police)"	Baxxter, Speiser, Simon, Thele, Gareth Owen, Eddy Steeneken	3:35
15.	"Ti sento"	Carlo Marrale, Sergio Cossu Carrabetta, Salvatore Stellita	3:55
16.	"C'est Bleu" (featuring Vicky Leandros)	Charles Jean Popp, Pierre Cour, Baxxter, Jordan, Simon, Thele	3:11
17.	"Hello! (Good to Be Back)"	Gary Glitter, Mike Leander, Baxxter, Jordan, Frog, Thele	3:29
18.	"Stuck on Replay"	Lionel B. Richie Jr., Baxxter, Jordan, Simon, Thele	3:09
19.	"Today" (featuring Vassy)	Baxxter, Speiser, Simon, Thele, Achim Jannsen, Owen, Tony Verdult, Koen Groeneveld, Margareta L. J. Greet Voermans, Adriaan Addy van der Zwan	3:27
20.	"It's a Biz (Ain't Nobody)"	David Wolinski	3:22
21.	"I Was Made for Lovin' You"	Paul Stanley, Desmond Child, Vini Poncia	3:33

Disc 3
No.	Title	Writer(s)	Length
1.	"Endless Summer"	Baxxter, Jordan, Bueller, Thele	3:44
2.	"Fire"	Baxxter, Jordan, Bueller, Thele	3:31
3.	"The Night"	Lino Nicolosi, Barbara Addoms, Baxxter, Jordan, Frog, Thele	3:23
4.	"Bora! Bora! Bora!"	Michele Chieregato, Roberto Turatti, Fiorenzo Zanotti, Thomas Beecher Hooker, Baxxter, Speiser, Simon, Thele	3:12
5.	"Oi"	Baxxter, Speiser, Simon, Thele	3:10
6.	"Lass uns tanzen"	Baxxter, Jordan, Simon, Thele	3:43
7.	"My Gabber" (with JeBroer)	Tim Kimman, Eelco van Proosdij, David van Akkeren, Baxxter, Speiser, Simon, Thele	2:55
8.	"Jump That Rock (Whatever You Want)" (vs. Status Quo)	Rick Parfitt, Andy Bown, Baxxter, Jordan, Simon, Thele	3:22
9.	"Radiate (Spy Version)" (featuring Vassy)	Vassy Karagiorgos, Nik Frost, Jesse Glick, Baxxter, Speiser, Thele	3:07
10.	"Riot"	Baxxter, Speiser, Simon, Thele, Tim Kesteloo, Michael Maidwell, Jacob Streefkerk, Michael Kurth, Jasmin Shakeri-Nejad	3:05
11.	"And No Matches"	Baxxter, Jordan, Simon, Thele, Emilia, Yogi	3:32
12.	"David Doesn't Eat"	Nicholas Charles Bailey, Baxxter, Jordan, Simon, Thele	3:37
13.	"Friends Turbo"	Baxxter, Jordan, Bueller, Thele	3:21
14.	"Break It Up"	Nosie Katzmann	3:38
15.	"Shake That!"	Harry Wayne Casey, Richard Raymond Finch, Baxxter, Jordan, Frog, Thele	3:16
16.	"Suavemente"	Elvis Crespo	3:37
17.	"The Only One"	Baxxter, Jordan, Chris Avantgrade, Simon, Thele, Jon Baker, Martin Blunt, Jon Brookes, Tim Burgess, Mark Collins	3:32
18.	"She's the Sun"	Baxxter, Jordan, Coon, Thele	3:49
19.	"Let Me Be Your Valentine"	Baxxter, Jordan, Bueller, Thele	3:50
20.	"Behind the Cow"	Baxxter, Jordan, Simon, Thele, Fatman Scoop	3:34
21.	"Vallée de Larmes"	DJ Zki & Dobre	4:35

=== 5-disc version ===
CD 4: Olga Scheps – 100% Scooter – Piano Only
No.	Title	Length
1.	"4 AM"
2.	"One (Always Hardcore)"
3.	"Friends"
4.	"How Much Is the Fish?"
5.	"I'm Lonely"
6.	"The Logical Song"
7.	"Nessaja"
8.	"Weekend!"
9.	"Mary Got No Lamb"
10.	"Maria (I Like It Loud)"
11.	"Bigroom Blitz"

CD 5: "Who the Fuck Is H.P. Baxxter" – DJ mix
No.	Title	Length
1.	"Maria (I Like It Loud)" (R.I.O. Remix)
2.	"Bigroom Blitz" (Scooter Remix)
3.	"Today" (Scooter Remix)
4.	"Opium"
5.	"The Only Club"
6.	"How Much Is the Fish?" (Tony Junior Remix)
7.	"Mary Got No Lamb" (Arena Mix)
8.	"In Rave We Trust – Amateur Hour" (Anthem Club Mix)
9.	"Kashmir"
10.	"Vallée de Larmes"
11.	"Frequent Traveller"
12.	"Metropolis"
13.	"Devil Drums"
14.	"Trance-Atlantic"
15.	"Way Up North"
16.	"Turn Up That Blaster"
17.	"Sunrise (Here I Am)" (Ratty)
18.	"Main Floor"
19.	"Acid Bomb"
20.	"Level One"
21.	"Giant's Causeway"
22.	"A Little Bit Too Fast"
23.	"Soul Train"
24.	"The Pusher 2"
25.	"Lighten Up the Sky"
26.	"Rhapsody In E"
27.	"Coldwater Canyon"
28.	"Back In Time"
29.	"The First Time"
30.	"Stuttgart"
31.	"Bramfeld"
32.	"Unity Without Words (Part II)"
33.	"Awakening"
34.	"Crank It Up"

=== Limited deluxe box ===
The special collector's edition of the album, titled 100% Scooter – 25 Years Wild & Wicked (Limited Deluxe Box), contains the 5 CDs mentioned above, plus a vinyl LP of Olga Scheps' tribute album 100% Scooter – Piano Only, a MC with the megamix and selected tracks from another tribute album Hands On Scooter, and a 112-page photo book including photos from 25 years of the band, lyrics of all singles and discography. This edition is limited to 2000 copies.

==== LP: Olga Scheps – 100% Scooter – Piano Only ====
Side one
No.	Title	Length
1.	"4 AM"
2.	"One (Always Hardcore)"
3.	"Friends"
4.	"How Much Is the Fish?"
5.	"I'm Lonely"

Side two
No.	Title	Length
1.	"The Logical Song"
2.	"Nessaja"
3.	"Weekend!"
4.	"Mary Got No Lamb"
5.	"Maria (I Like It Loud)"
6.	"Bigroom Blitz"

==== MC: Exclusive Scooter MC ====
Side one: Scooter Megamix
No.	Title	Length
1.	"Scooter Megamix"

Side two: Hands On Scooter – Selected Tracks
No.	Title	Artist(s)	Length
1.	"Beweg dein Arsch (Move Your Ass)"	Sido featuring Kitty Kat & Tony D
2.	"Hyper Hyper"	Modeselektor featuring Otto von Schirach
3.	"Weekend!"	Bloodhound Gang
4.	"I’m Raving"	Jan Delay & Moonbootica
5.	"Was kostet der Fisch? (How Much Is the Fish?)"	K.I.Z
6.	"Nessaja"	Alexander Marcus
7.	"Friends"	Klostertaler

== Charts ==
Chart (2017–18)	Peak position
Austrian Albums (Ö3 Austria)	52
Belgian Albums (Ultratop Flanders)	47
German Albums (Offizielle Top 100)	19
Hungarian Albums (MAHASZ)	29
Swiss Albums (Schweizer Hitparade)	47
UK Dance Albums (OCC)	10

== Olga Scheps – 100% Scooter – Piano Only ==
100% Scooter – Piano Only

Studio album by Olga Scheps
- Released: December 15, 2017
- Studio: Fattoria Musica (Osnabrück, Germany)
- Genre: Classical crossover
- Label: Sheffield Tunes Classics; Kontor
- Producer: Sven Helbig

Olga Scheps chronology
Tchaikovsky (2017)	100% Scooter – Piano Only (2017)	Melody (2019)

100% Scooter – Piano Only is a studio album by Russian-German classical pianist Olga Scheps, released on 15 December 2017 through Sheffield Tunes Classics and Kontor Records.

- For track listing see above.
