= The Stadium Techno Inferno =

2011 live album by Scooter

Live album by Scooter
- Released: 14 October 2011
- Recorded: 25 June 2011
- Venue: Imtech Arena, Hamburg, Germany
- Genre: Hardstyle; jumpstyle; trance; techno
- Length: 126:31
- Language: English, German
- Label: Sheffield Tunes
- Producer: H.P. Baxxter; Rick J. Jordan; Michael Simon; Jens Thiele

Scooter chronology
Live in Hamburg (2010)	The Stadium Techno Inferno (2011)	The Big Mash Up (2011)

The Stadium Techno Inferno 2011

Video by Scooter
- Released: 14 October 2011
- Recorded: 25 June 2011
- Venue: Imtech Arena, Hamburg, Germany
- Genre: Hardstyle; jumpstyle; trance; techno
- Length: 126:31
- Language: English, German
- Label: Sheffield Tunes

Scooter chronology
Live in Hamburg (2010)	The Stadium Techno Inferno 2011 (2011)

The Stadium Techno Inferno is a live album by German hard dance band Scooter. It was released as a CD on The Big Mash Up album, released the same year. It was deemed "Bigger and Louder" and encouraged fans to "be a part of it". It featured many guests, including Die Atzen and Jan Delay, it was announced after the sellout concert in Hamburg in 2010.

It was streamed in over 60 cinemas and on Bild.

== Track listing ==
No.	Title	Writer(s)	Length
1.	"Hello! (Good to Be Back)"	Gary Glitter; Mike Leander; H.P. Baxxter; Rick J. Jordan; Jay Frog; Jens Thiele	6:44
2.	"Aiii Shot the DJ"	Baxxter; Jordan; Axel Coon; Thiele
3.	"Jumping All Over the World"	Georg Kajanus; Baxxter; Jordan; Michael Simon; Thiele
4.	"The Question Is What Is The Question?"	Harry van Hoof; Hans van Hemert; Baxxter; Jordan; Simon; Thiele
5.	"I'm Raving (with Jan Delay)"	Marc Cohn
6.	"The Only One"	Baxxter; Jordan; Simon; The Charlatans
7.	"Ramp! (The Logical Song)"	Roger Hodgson
8.	"The Leading Horse"
9.	"Stuck on Replay (Extended)"
10.	"Medley"
11.	"Jigga Jigga!"	Baxxter; Jordan; Frog
12.	"Habanera"
13.	"Fuck the Millennium / Call Me Mañana"	Baxxter; Jordan; Coon
14.	"No Fate"	Baxxter; Jordan; Ferris Bueller
15.	"Ti sento"	Carlo Marrale; Sergio Cossu Carrabetta; Salvatore Stellia
16.	"J'adore Hardcore (Extended)"	{{hlist|Carlo Marrale|[[Aldo Stellita|Sergio Cossu}}
17.	"Jump That Rock (Whatever You Want)"	Baxxter; Jordan; Simon; Andy Bown; Rick Parfitt
18.	"How Much Is the Fish? (with Heniz Strunk)"	Baxxter; Jordan; Coon
19.	"One (Always Hardcore)"	Jeroen Streunding; Baxxter; Jordan; Frog
20.	"Fire"	Baxxter; Jordan; Bueller; Thiele
21.	"Nessaja"	Peter Maffay; Rolf Zuckowski; Baxxter
22.	"Maria (I Like It Loud)"	Baxxter; Jordan; Frog; Thiele; Marc Acardipane
23.	"Medley Finale"	Baxxter; Jordan; Bueller; the Trashmen
