= Live in Hamburg (Scooter album) =

2010 live album by Scooter

Live album by Scooter
- Released: 7 May 2010
- Recorded: 12 March 2010
- Studio: A.P.O.S. Music Productions Studio, Sheffield Underground Studios, Hamburg
- Genre: Hard trance, Hardstyle, Jumpstyle
- Length: 78:00
- Label: Sheffield Tunes
- Producer: Scooter

Scooter chronology
Under the Radar Over the Top (2009)	Live in Hamburg (2010)	The Big Mash Up (2011)

Live in Hamburg

Video by Scooter
- Released: 7 May 2010
- Recorded: 12 March 2010; Color Line Arena, Hamburg, Germany
- Studio: A.P.O.S. Music Productions Studio, Sheffield Underground Studios, Hamburg
- Genre: Hard trance, Hardstyle, Jumpstyle
- Length: 95:51 (Live concert)
- Label: Sheffield Tunes
- Director: Frank Dittmann
- Producer: Florian Arlart

Scooter video chronology
Excess All Areas (2006)	Live in Hamburg (2010)	The Complete Video Collection (2013)

Live in Hamburg is a live album by German techno group Scooter. The album was released on 7 May 2010, and is accompanied by Blu-ray and DVD releases.

== History ==
The album was recorded at the "biggest Scooter concert ever" at the Color Line Arena, in Hamburg, Germany. This was during the Under The Radar Over The Top Tour, where Scooter were promoting their 2009 studio album Under the Radar Over the Top.

== Track listing ==
=== CD Release ===
No.	Title	Length
1.	"Intro / J'adore Hardcore"	5:57
2.	"Posse (I Need You on the Floor)"	4:46
3.	"The Sound Above My Hair"	3:58
4.	"Stuck on Replay"	5:47
5.	"Jumping All Over the World"	4:42
6.	"The Question Is What Is the Question?"	4:06
7.	"Second Skin"	6:01
8.	"Weekend!"	3:47
9.	"Bit a Bad Boy"	4:19
10.	"One (Always Hardcore)"	4:34
11.	"Ti sento"	4:03
12.	"Jump That Rock (Whatever You Want)"	4:10
13.	"Nessaja"	4:40
14.	"How Much Is the Fish?"	4:35
15.	"Maria (I Like It Loud)"	6:17
16.	"Endless Summer / Hyper Hyper / Move Your Ass!"	6:05

=== Web Release ===
No.	Title	Length
1.	"Intro / J'adore Hardcore"	5:57
2.	"Posse (I Need You on the Floor)"	4:46
3.	"The Sound Above My Hair"	3:58
4.	"Stuck on Replay"	5:47
5.	"Jumping All Over the World"	4:42
6.	"The Question Is What Is the Question?"	4:06
7.	"Second Skin"	6:01
8.	"Clic Clac / Scarborough Reloaded"	5:57
9.	"Fire"	4:06
10.	"Fuck the Millennium / Call Me Mañana"	5:26
11.	"Weekend!"	3:47
12.	"Bit a Bad Boy"	4:19
13.	"One (Always Hardcore)"	4:34
14.	"Ti sento"	4:03
15.	"Jump That Rock (Whatever You Want)"	4:10
16.	"Nessaja"	4:40
17.	"How Much Is the Fish?"	4:35
18.	"Maria (I Like It Loud)"	6:17
19.	"Endless Summer / Hyper Hyper / Move Your Ass!"	6:05

== DVD and Blu-ray ==
A DVD was released along with a special edition Blu-ray, each containing the accompanying live footage to each track on the online release. The Blu-ray contains every Scooter music video to date as well.

== Release history ==
List of release dates, showing country, record label, and format
Region	Date	Label	Format
Germany	7 May 2010	Sheffield Tunes	CD
Germany	7 May 2010	Sheffield Tunes	DVD
Germany	7 May 2010	Sheffield Tunes	Blu-ray
Germany	7 May 2010	Sheffield Tunes	digital download
Australia	7 May 2010	Central Station	CD
Russia	7 May 2010	Kontora Music	DVD

== Reception and chart performance ==
When the CD/DVD/Blu-ray was announced, many pre-ordered it from Amazon.de. The pre-orders were very high, and the CD was expected to chart well since it stayed at number one in the Live Albums category on Amazon.

Upon release, the CD entered the official German album chart at fourteen, whilst the DVD entered the German DVD Media Control Charts at number one.

Reception for the CD and DVD was generally good, though many criticized the lack of one of the more popular tracks that was played during the tour, "Where the Beats...", which was specifically re-edited for the tour. No official statement was made as to why this track was omitted, nor why it was the only one excluded, but many fans suspected that it was because the modified version utilized a chorus very similar to the U2 song "Where the Streets Have No Name". Where the Beats... would eventually be included on Clubland TV in the UK in 2017.

== Charts ==
Chart (2010)	Peak position
German Albums (Offizielle Top 100)	14
