= Olga Scheps discography =

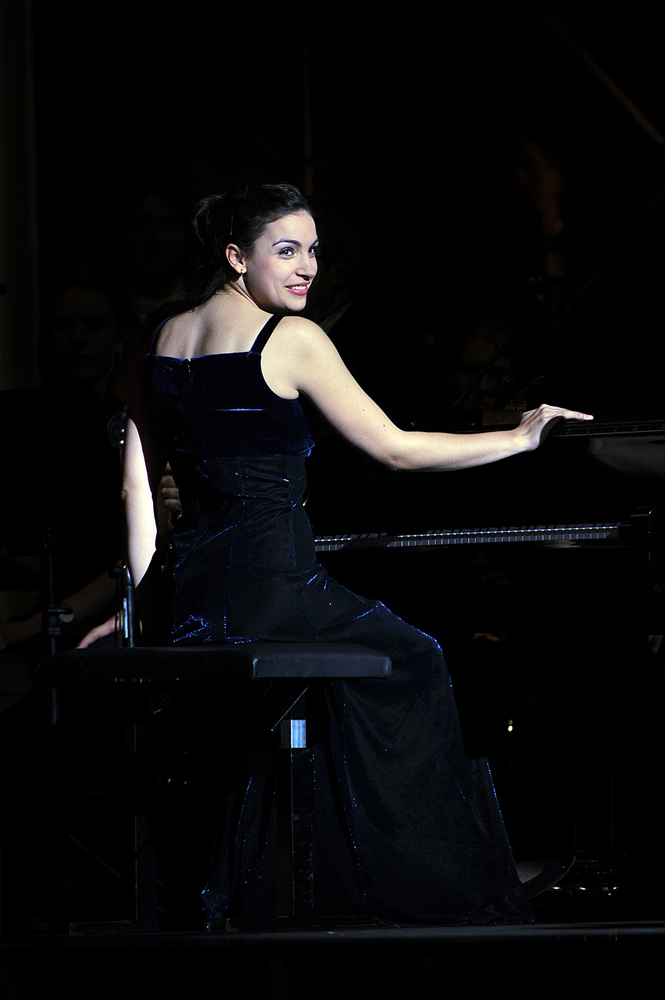
- Olga at the anniversary ceremony "50 Years of Culture at Audi" on 11 November 2012
- Studio albums: 10
- Live albums: 1
- Music videos: 1

German-Russian classical pianist Olga Scheps has released ten studio albums and one live album. Her first live album was recorded and published in the Edition Klavier-Festival Ruhr in cooperation with the Fono Forum magazine under CAvi-music in 2009.

She signed her first exclusive contract with RCA Red Seal (Sony Music) in 2009. It was followed by the release of her debut studio album, Chopin, which peaked in the top-ten on the German classical charts containing the works of Frédéric Chopin. Olga Scheps won the ECHO Klassik Award 2010 for Newcomer of the Year (Piano) because of the very good sales figures she enjoyed with her debut during the year. The pianist's third and latest studio album, Schubert, was released in 2012. Olga Scheps has achieved considerable critical success for her works. Especially for her debut the German Frankfurter Allgemeine Zeitung calls her "the new star in the Chopin heaven" after a solo recital.

== Albums ==
=== Studio albums ===
List of studio albums
Title	Album details	Notes
Chopin	Released: 15 January 2010; Label: RCA Red Seal (Sony Music); Formats: CD, digital download	Includes works by Frédéric Chopin.
Russian Album	Released: 19 November 2010; Label: RCA Red Seal (Sony Music); Formats: CD, digital download	Includes works by Alexander Skrjabin, Anton Arensky, Mily Balakirev, Mikhail Glinka, Anatoly Lyadov, Sergei Rachmaninoff, Anton Rubinstein, Pyotr Ilyich Tchaikovsky and Nikolai Titov.
Schubert	Released: 17 August 2012; Label: RCA Red Seal (Sony Music); Formats: CD, digital download	Includes works by Franz Schubert.
The Chopin Piano Concertos No. 1 & 2	Released: 17 January 2014; Label: RCA Red Seal (Sony Music); Formats: CD, digital download	Includes works by Frédéric Chopin: Piano Concertos 1 & 2. Chamber Orchestra of Stuttgart, Matthias Foremny, direction
100% Scooter – Piano Only	Released: 15 December 2017; Label: Sheffield Tunes Classics (Kontor); Formats: CD, LP, (Note: Released on LP as part of the deluxe box of 100% Scooter – 25 Years Wild & Wicked by Scooter.) digital download	Includes works by Scooter

=== Live albums ===
List of live albums
Title	Album details	Notes
Piano Recital	Released: 10 July 2009; Label: RCA Red Seal (Sony Music); Formats: CD, digital download	Recorded live at the Klavier-Festival Ruhr in May 2009 with works by Wolfgang Amadeus Mozart, Franz Schubert, Felix Mendelssohn and Robert Schumann.

== Music videos ==
Classical work	Year	Artist(s)	Director(s)	Description
Rachmaninoff Prelude No. 5	2012	Olga Scheps	finkernagel & lück medienproduktion	The video was shot at the Berlin Philharmonie, Germany during her appearance on 27 October 2011.
How Much Is the Fish?	2017	Olga Scheps		
Maria (I Like It Loud)	2018	Olga Scheps		
