= Rough and Tough and Dangerous – The Singles 94/98 =

1998 compilation album by Scooter

Compilation album by Scooter
- Released: 19 January 1998
- Recorded: 1993–1997
- Studio: The Ambience Studio (Hanover, Germany, 1993–1995); Loop Dance Constructions Studios (Hamburg, Germany, 1995–1997)
- Length: 144:58
- Label: Club Tools
- Producer: Scooter

Scooter chronology
Age of Love (1997)	Rough and Tough and Dangerous – The Singles 94/98 (1998)	No Time to Chill (1998)

Singles from Rough and Tough and Dangerous – The Singles 94/98
- 1. "No Fate" Released: 1 December 1997

Rough and Tough and Dangerous – The Singles 94/98

Video by Scooter
- Released: 2 January 1998
- Recorded: 1994–1997
- Genre: Eurodance, trance
- Length: 44:51
- Label: Club Tools

Scooter video chronology
Happy Hardcore Clips ...and the Show Goes On! (1996)	Rough and Tough and Dangerous – The Singles 94/98 (1998)	Encore: The Whole Story (2002)

Professional ratings
Review scores
Source	Rating
AllMusic	4/5 stars

Rough and Tough and Dangerous – The Singles 94/98 is the first singles compilation from the German electronic/hardcore group Scooter, released in January 1998. It collects all the singles from their first four albums, plus one new song, a cover of Zyon's "No Fate". It includes some live tracks, B-sides and remixes. The title is a lyric from the Maxi Version of the single "Endless Summer".

== Track listing ==
CD Compilation Disc 1
No.	Title	Writer(s)	Length
1.	"Hyper Hyper" (Video Edit)	H.P. Baxxter, Rick J. Jordan, Ferris Bueller, Jens Thele	3:36
2.	"Move Your Ass!" (Video Edit)	Baxxter, Jordan, Bueller, Thele	3:59
3.	"Friends"	Baxxter, Jordan, Bueller, Thele	4:41
4.	"Endless Summer" (Maxi Version)	Baxxter, Jordan, Bueller, Thele	5:14
5.	"Back in the U.K." (Radio Version)	Baxxter, Jordan, Bueller, Thele	3:25
6.	"Let Me Be Your Valentine" (Edit)	Baxxter, Jordan, Bueller, Thele	3:49
7.	"Rebel Yell" (Radio Version)	Billy Idol, Steve Stevens	3:41
8.	"I'm Raving"	Marc Cohn	3:38
9.	"Break It Up"	Nosie Katzmann	3:39
10.	"Fire"	Baxxter, Jordan, Bueller, Thele	3:33
11.	"The Age of Love"	Baxxter, Jordan, Bueller, Thele	3:52
12.	"No Fate"	Steffen Britzke, Matthias Hoffmann, René Swain, Baxxter, Jordan, Bueller, Thele	3:43
13.	"Fire" (Live)	Baxxter, Jordan, Bueller, Thele	5:04
14.	"Rebel Yell" (Live)	Idol, Stevens	5:12
15.	"Break It Up" (Live)	Katzmann	3:19
16.	"The Age of Love" (Live)	Baxxter, Jordan, Bueller, Thele	5:18
Total length:			01:05:45

Disc 2
No.	Title	Writer(s)	Length
1.	"Vallée de Larmes" (Re-Incarnation By The Loop! Version)	DJ Zki & Dobre	4:37
2.	"Rhapsody in E"	Baxxter, Jordan, Bueller, Thele	6:10
3.	"Move Your Ass!" (Ultra-Sonic Remix)	Baxxter, Jordan, Bueller, Thele	7:16
4.	"Friends" (Ramon Zenker Club Mix)	Baxxter, Jordan, Bueller, Thele	5:33
5.	"Across the Sky"	Baxxter, Jordan, Bueller, Thele	5:47
6.	"Endless Summer" (Datura Remix)	Baxxter, Jordan, Bueller, Thele	4:54
7.	"Back in Time"	Baxxter, Jordan, Bueller, Thele	7:06
8.	"Unity Without Words Part II"	Baxxter, Jordan, Bueller, Thele	5:29
9.	"Euphoria"	Baxxter, Jordan, Bueller, Thele	4:00
10.	"Let Me be Your Valentine" (Commander Tom Remix)	Baxxter, Jordan, Bueller, Thele	8:05
11.	"B-Site"	Baxxter, Jordan, Bueller, Thele	5:37
12.	"I'm Raving" (Taucher Remix)	Cohn	8:10
13.	"Fire" (D.O.N.S. Burn Rubber Remix)	Baxxter, Jordan, Bueller, Thele	6:29
Total length:			01:19:13

Note: Track 12 on CD2 is an edited version.

Video Compilation
No.	Title	Music Video Director	Length
1.	"Hyper Hyper"	Plastic Reality	3:36
2.	"Move Your Ass!"	Eric Will	3:59
3.	"Friends"	Eric Will	4:41
4.	"Endless Summer"	Eric Will	5:14
5.	"Back in the U.K."	Rainer Thieding	3:25
6.	"Let Me be Your Valentine"	Russel Curtis	3:49
7.	"Rebel Yell"	Rainer Thieding	3:41
8.	"I'm Raving"	Rainer Thieding	3:38
9.	"Break It Up"	Rainer Thieding	3:39
10.	"Fire"	Robert Broellochs	3:33
11.	"The Age of Love"	Robert Broellochs	3:52
12.	"No Fate"	Robert Broellochs	3:43
Total length:			44:51

== Charts ==
Chart performance for Rough and Tough and Dangerous – The Singles 94/98
Chart (1998)	Peak position
Austrian Albums (Ö3 Austria)	47
Finnish Albums (Suomen virallinen lista)	2
German Albums (Offizielle Top 100)	36
Norwegian Albums (VG-lista)	12
Swedish Albums (Sverigetopplistan)	18

== Certifications ==
Certifications for Rough and Tough and Dangerous – The Singles 94/98
Region	Certification	Certified units/sales
Sweden (GLF)	Gold	40,000^{^}
^{^} Shipments figures based on certification alone.
