= Under the Radar Over the Top =

Studio album by Scooter
- Released: 2 October 2009
- Recorded: 2009
- Studio: Sheffield Underground Studios
- Genres: Jumpstyle; hardstyle; hard trance
- Length: 46:08
- Label: Sheffield Tunes
- Producers: H.P. Baxxter; Rick J. Jordan; Michael Simon; Jens Thele

Scooter chronology
Jumping All Over the World (2007)	Under the Radar Over the Top (2009)	Live in Hamburg (2010)

Singles from Under the Radar Over the Top
- 1. "J'adore Hardcore" Released: 14 August 2009; 2. "Ti sento" Released: 2 October 2009; 3. "The Sound Above My Hair" Released: 27 November 2009; 4. "Stuck on Replay" Released: 12 March 2010

Professional ratings
Review scores
Source	Rating
AllMusic	positive
Random.Access	7.5/10

Under the Radar Over the Top is the fourteenth studio album by German hard dance group Scooter. The album was released in Germany on 2 October 2009, preceded by the single "J'adore Hardcore" on 14 August. A second single, "Ti sento", was released on the same day as the album. The album was released in the UK on 23 November 2009. The third single "The Sound Above My Hair" was released on 27 November 2009., and "Stuck on Replay", the fourth single from the album was used as the official theme song of 2010 IIHF World Championship.

The album's cover was photographed at the former American NSA espionage site Teufelsberg in Berlin. The title comes from Alexis Petridis' Guardian article about the group's unexpected UK success in 2008.

The album's release was supported by a German tour in March 2010. The album went Gold the same year.

== Track listing ==
No.	Title	Length
1.	"Stealth"	1:23
2.	"J'adore Hardcore"	4:20
3.	"Ti sento"	3:55
4.	"State of Mind"	3:30
5.	"Where the Beats..."	3:51
6.	"Bit a Bad Boy"	3:47
7.	"The Sound Above My Hair"	4:38
8.	"See Your Smile"	4:13
9.	"Clic Clac"	4:29
10.	"Second Skin (The Chameleons cover)"	5:54
11.	"Stuck on Replay"	3:10
12.	"Metropolis"	5:38

=== Limited edition ===
A limited edition version of the album features a second CD entitled The Dark Side Edition and a bonus DVD.

==== The Dark Side Edition track listing ====
No.	Title	Length
1.	"She's The Sun"	3:48
2.	"Take Me Baby"	4:15
3.	"Frequent Traveller"	3:37
4.	"Eyes Without a Face"	3:18
5.	"Dancing in the Moonlight"	4:33
6.	"Lass Uns Tanzen" (Day Version)	3:42
7.	"Stripped" (Live)	4:21
8.	"Sex Dwarf"	4:19
9.	"Am Fenster"	5:52
10.	"Marian (Version)"	4:55

The DVD features a personal Scooter travelogue from the band’s trip through Australia, Africa and Asia as well as an exclusive interview and selected comments on the album.

==== 20 Years of Hardcore Expanded Edition ====
This version, released in 2013, contains the standard album (possibly remastered) and a bonus disc that contains remixes, B-sides, and selected versions of tracks. The bonus disc's track list is as follows:

1. J'adore Hardcore ("the Melbourne" club mix)
2. J'adore Hardcore (Megastylez remix)
3. Dushbag
4. J'adore Hardcore (Eric Chase remix)
5. Ti sento (V.I.P. Room club mix)
6. Scarborough Reloaded
7. Ti sento (Lissat & Voltaxx remix)
8. The Sound Above My Hair (radio edit)
9. Lucullus
10. The Sound Above My Hair (electro mix)
11. Stuck on Replay (the club mix)
12. P.U.C.K.

== Tour ==
Scooter in Leipzig on their Under the Radar Over the Top Tour

After Scooter’s success in 2008, they announced a new tour for 2010 across Germany and Switzerland, later they announced a Christmas tour named the Stuff the Turkey X-Mas Tour which would be held in select locations, they also were planned to perform at the Clubland Live! 3 event but pulled out due to the tour.

Scooter preferred the Sheffield Jumpers less this tour, reducing the amount of jumpers to just 2 (Pim Fontijn and Sergej van Ettekoven) and made a shuffle division.

The tour also included the new hardstyle remixes of Posse (I Need You on the Floor), Endless Summer and Move Your Ass! respectfully (also including the special version of Hyper Hyper), this tour also continued the trend of having Fuck the Millennium and Call Me Mañana mashed up together. The Stuff the Turkey X-Mas Tour replaced The Sound Above My Hair with I'm Raving.

=== Track list ===
According to the page on Hungarian Wikipedia

1. The Exorcist intro + Stealth
2. J'adore Hardcore
3. Posse (I Need You on the Floor)
4. The Sound Above My Hair (Replaced by I'm Raving during the Stuff the Turkey X-Mas Tour)
5. Jumping All Over the World
6. The Question Is What Is the Question?
7. The Chaser/Jigga Jigga!
8. Where the Beats... (mash up with Irish rock band U2 hit single Where the Streets Have No Name)
9. Bit a Bad Boy
10. Frequent Traveller
11. Second Skin
12. Fuck the Millennium/Call Me Mañana
13. Medley (Clic Clac + Scarborough Reloaded)
14. Weekend!
15. Fire
16. Stuck on Replay
17. Jump That Rock (Whatever You Want)
18. Ti sento
19. Nessaja
20. How Much Is the Fish? (2008 remix)
21. One (Always Hardcore)
22. Maria (I Like It Loud)
23. Medley Finale (Endless Summer + Hyper Hyper + Move Your Ass!)

=== Main tour dates ===
1. Koln, Germany (11 March 2010)
2. Hamburg, Germany (12 March 2010)
3. Berlin, Germany (13 March 2010)
4. Zurich, Switzerland (15 March 2010)
5. Rastatt, Germany (16 March 2010)
6. Munich, Germany (18 March 2010)
7. Essen, Germany (19 March 2010)
8. Leipzig, Germany (20 March 2010)

=== Stuff the Turkey X-Mas Tour dates ===
1. Rostock, Germany (2 December 2010)
2. Dresden, Germany (3 December 2010)
3. Erfurt, Germany (4 December 2010)
4. Wiesbaden, Germany (6 December 2010)
5. Bremen, Germany (7 December 2010)
6. Dortmund, Germany (8 December 2010)
7. Regensburg, Germany (10 December 2010)
8. Stuttgart, Germany (11 December 2010)
9. Freiburg, Germany (12 December 2010)

== Other variates ==
=== Deluxe VIP Fan Box ===
A second, even more limited edition of the album, entitled the Under the Radar Over the Top Deluxe VIP Fan Box, includes the same content as the Limited Edition version along with a Scooter flag, Scooter dog tags, and 5 post cards featuring the band members, and a special box featuring images from the photoshoot of the NSA location on the cover of the album.

=== UK edition ===
The UK version features a different cover and includes a DVD with all the group's music videos from "Hyper Hyper" to "Jump That Rock (Whatever You Want)", similar to the German re-release of Jumping All Over the World. The album sold 8,000 copies in the first week after release and entered the official UK album charts at number 62.

== Charts ==
Chart (2009–2010)	Peak position
Austrian Albums (Ö3 Austria)	15
German Albums (Offizielle Top 100)	2
Hungarian Albums (MAHASZ)	38
Scottish Albums (Official Charts)	32
Swiss Albums (Schweizer Hitparade)	51
UK Albums (Official Charts)	62
UK Dance Albums (Official Charts)	9
UK Album Downloads (Official Charts)	78

In 2010. It was awarded a gold certification from the Independent Music Companies Association which indicated sales of at least 100,000 copies throughout Europe.

== Certifications ==
Region	Certification	Certified units/sales
United Kingdom (BPI)	Gold	100,000^{‡}
^{‡} Sales+streaming figures based on certification alone.

== Notes ==
- "Stealth" contains voice samples from sample pack "Vengeance Essential Clubsounds Vol.3" created by Manuel Schleis. It also samples the alien transmission from the film Contact.
- "J'adore Hardcore" uses French fan Maddy's voice for the eponym lyrics "J'adore Hardcore" and samples Planet Funk's 2001 single "Chase the Sun", from the 2002 album Non Zero Sumness as well as the 2009 songs "Lullaby" by Activator and uses a sample that is heavily inspired by the melody of the track "I Just Can't Stop" by The Pitcher. On 30 July 2009, during the video shoot for the single, H.P. Baxxter was almost a victim of a car bomb attack in Majorca, Spain.
- "Ti sento" is inspired by the song of the same name by Technoboy, which itself samples Matia Bazar's 1985 single "Ti sento". The song by Scooter includes Italian vocals by Antonella Ruggiero, who was the vocal performer in the original version. Playing an opera singer, Ruggiero also appears in the accompanying music video, which premièred on 18 September 2009. The sound effects at the beginning of the song are from "Music or Noize" by Wildstylez. It also uses the melody from the song "Sonic Sabotage" by Crypsis & Kold Konexion.
- "State of Mind" samples the song "Pale" by Within Temptation and uses a sample that is heavily inspired by the melody of the track "Next Dimensional World" by Technoboy.
- "Where the Beats..." samples its intro and melody from Technoboy's version of "Ti sento", some parts sampling "Cold Rocking" by Wildstylez & the Prophet, while the melodic female vocals and lyrics are very similar to Celtic Woman's version of the Irish folk song Carrickfergus (song) albeit with altered lyrics.
- "Bit a Bad Boy" samples the Krezip song "I Would Stay" and the melody also samples "Rock Civilization" by Headhunterz.
- "The Sound Above My Hair" samples the Black Song "Wonderful Life".
- "See You Smile" samples the song "Rainbow in the Sky" by DJ Paul Elstak. The melody also samples Rephex & ABW's "Nuclear".
- The melody of "Clic Clac" comes from Pinocchio's theme, written by Italian composer Fiorenzo Carpi De Resmini. The track also samples Technoboy's "Put Some Grace (In Your Face)" and Tuneboy's "Re-Generate It".
- "Second Skin" is a cover of the same name song by The Chameleons.
- "Stuck on Replay" is based on the melody of "DJ Phil Ty - A Kay A (EHM remix)", next to sampling Lionel Richie's "Stuck on You".
- "Metropolis" samples Ron Van den Beuken's remix of Randy Katana's "In Silence".
- On the back of the album cover for the DVD version of Under the Radar Over the Top there is a spelling mistake for The Question is What is the Question.
- "Marian (Version)" is a cover of the same name song by The Sisters of Mercy.
