= The Russian Album (disambiguation) =

The Russian Album refers to Choba B CCCP, album by Paul McCartney

It may also refer to:

- The Russian Album, novel by Michael Ignatieff 1977 Heinemann Award winner
- Russian Album, album by Anna Netrebko
- Russian Album, album by Olga Scheps
