= Wicked! (Scooter album) =

Studio album by Scooter
- Released: 24 October 1996
- Recorded: 1996
- Studios: Loop Dance Constructions Studios, Hamburg, Germany
- Length: 46:13
- Label: Club Tools
- Producer: The Loop!

Scooter chronology
| Our Happy Hardcore (1996) | Wicked! (1996) | Age of Love (1997) |

Singles from Wicked!
- 1. "I'm Raving" Released: 19 September 1996; 2. "Break It Up" Released: 14 November 1996

Professional ratings
Review scores
| Source | Rating |
|---|---|
| Random.Access | 7.5/10 |

Wicked! is the third studio album by German band Scooter, released in 1996. It contains two singles, "I'm Raving", and "Break It Up".

The album was re-released on LP on 17 September 2021 to coincide with the 25th anniversary of the album's release. It was available on black and blue LP, with the blue coloured vinyl being limited to 500 copies.

== Track listing ==
All tracks written by H.P. Baxxter, Rick J. Jordan, Jens Thele, and Ferris Bueller, except "I'm Raving" written by Marc Cohn; and "Don't Let It Be Me" and "Break It Up" written by Nosie Katzmann.

1. "Wicked Introduction" – 1:44
2. "I'm Raving"– 3:28
3. "We Take You Higher" – 4:22
4. "Awakening" – 4:26
5. "When I Was a Young Boy" – 3:58
6. "Coldwater Canyon" – 5:16
7. "Scooter del Mar" – 4:58
8. "Zebras Crossing the Street" – 4:58
9. "Don't Let It be Me" – 3:59
10. "The First Time" – 5:25
11. "Break It Up" – 3:39

Notes

- "Wicked Introduction" is the tune of "Scotland the Brave". The next song, "I'm Raving", features samples of the same song, and also "Walking in Memphis" by Marc Cohn.
- "When I Was a Young Boy" is based on The Loop!'s remix of the 1995 single "Babylon" by Prince Ital Joe Feat. Marky Mark. The Loop! was a remix project composed of H.P. Baxxter, Rick J. Jordan and Ferris Bueller.

== Charts ==
Chart performance for Wicked!
| Chart (1996) | Peak position |
|---|---|
| Austrian Albums (Ö3 Austria) | 30 |
| Finnish Albums (Suomen virallinen lista) | 5 |
| German Albums (Offizielle Top 100) | 22 |
| Hungarian Albums (MAHASZ) | 2 |
| Scottish Albums (Official Charts) | 52 |
| Swedish Albums (Sverigetopplistan) | 33 |
| Swiss Albums (Schweizer Hitparade) | 38 |
| UK Albums (Official Charts) | 76 |

== Certifications ==
Certifications for Wicked!
| Region | Certification | Certified units/sales |
|---|---|---|
| Poland (ZPAV) | Gold | 50,000^{*} |
^{*} Sales figures based on certification alone.
