= Running man (dance) =

Type of dance

Running Man Dance

The running man is a street dance, consisting of "shuffling" and sliding steps, imitating a stationary runner. The dancer takes steps forward, then slides the foot placed in front backwards almost immediately, while moving their fists forwards and back horizontally in front of them. The fad dance was said to have been started in the mid-1980s.

Notable practitioners of the dance were MC Hammer, Janet Jackson, Five Star, Selena, Milli Vanilli, and Vanilla Ice during their live concert shows and in music videos. According to Janet, Paula Abdul learned and then taught her the dance. Abdul also choreographed the 1987 film The Running Man. Jackson further popularized the dance, when she performed it in her 1989 music video "Rhythm Nation".

== Dance history ==
The running man is one of the most recognizable hip hop dances. Sources claim that MC Hammer developed the party dance in Oakland, California. Before the 1980s ended, Hammer made the dance his own, complete with his signature Hammer pants. Bobby Brown also popularized a variant called the Roger Rabbit dance (similar to a "backwards" running man), as seen in the music video for his song "Every Little Step" (1989). A proto version of the step was performed by one of Nigeria's Fela Anikulapo-Kuti female dancers on stage at his 1978 Berlin concert in Germany (1:17:11;).

The running man achieved massive popularity during the early to mid 1990s, and later scored a meme revival during the late 2000s, being performed in a similar manner as the Melbourne shuffle dance style. Additionally, singer Britney Spears performed it during her The M+M's Tour, and Scarlett Johansson claimed "I do a great running man" in an interview with Seventeen.

The pop duo LMFAO brought the running man back into the mainstream with their song "Party Rock Anthem", which was named the 2011 song of the summer by Billboard.

== See also ==
- Hip hop dance
- Melbourne shuffle
- Novelty and fad dances
- Running Man Challenge
- Street dance
