= FCK 2020 =

2020 single by Scooter

Single by Scooter

from the album God Save The Rave
- Released: October 23 2020
- Length: 3:29
- Label: Sheffield Tunes; Xploded Music
- Songwriters: H.P. Baxxter; Michael Simon; Sebastian Schilde; Jens Thiele; Vanessa Ulmer
- Producers: Michael Simon; Sebastian Schilde

Scooter singles chronology
"Bassdrum" (2020)	"FCK 2020" (2020)	"Paul is Dead" (2020)

"FCK 2020" is a single by German hard dance band Scooter, it was released on October 23 2020 as the sixth single from their twentieth album God Save The Rave.

The song is released in protest of the coronavirus pandemic worldwide. It is also the namesake for their documentary FCK 2020 2 1/2 with Scooter.

== Track listing ==
=== Download ===
1. "FCK 2020" — 3:29

=== Extended mix / download ===
1. "FCK 2020" (Extended Mix) — 4:24

== Notes ==
- The song samples "Pump It Loud !!" by The Pitcher.

== Charts ==
Chart performance for "FCK 2020"
Chart (2020)	Peak position
Germany	19
Hungary	2
Netherlands	16
Scotland	65
UK Singles	74
UK Singles Download	65
UK Video Streaming	50
