= Friends Turbo =

Single by Scooter

from the album New Kids Turbo (Soundtrack)/The Big Mash Up
- Released: 15 April 2011
- Recorded: 2011
- Genre: Happy hardcore; hardstyle; hardcore techno
- Label: Sheffield Tunes
- Songwriters: H.P. Baxxter; Rick J. Jordan; Ferris Bueller; Jens Thele

Scooter singles chronology
| "Stuck on Replay" (2010) | "Friends Turbo" (2011) | "The Only One" (2011) |

Music video
- "Friends Turbo" (Official video) on YouTube

"Friends Turbo" is a song by German electronic dance band Scooter, and the theme song to the German version of the Dutch film New Kids Turbo, as well as the first single of their fifteenth studio album The Big Mash Up. It was released on 15 April 2011, as a CD single and download release. It is a newer, updated version of their track "Friends" from 1995.

== Musical style and differences from the original ==
The track is a return to Scooter's old happy hardcore style with influences from both gabber and hardcore techno. Unlike their recent work from the albums Under the Radar Over the Top and Jumping All Over the World, which has been strongly influenced by hardstyle and jumpstyle, respectively, "Friends Turbo" has a much higher BPM, easily fitting into the happy hardcore genre. The track is recognizably different from the 1995 original, as more lyrics from band vocalist H.P. Baxxter have been added, various other instruments have been introduced into the mix, and the drums/bassline has been completely reworked. The band also returns to their trademark high pitched vocal, this time slightly autotuned to fit the 2011 sound.

== Music video ==
The first news of the music video was released on 8 April 2011 on a Dutch news site, which reported that Scooter were filming the music video for their new single in the small village of Maaskantje. The video shoot lasted two days, and involved the whole band and one character from the New Kids series, Gerrie van Boven, played by Tim Haars. There was reported news of a car accident on the set, which caused some concern as it was not made clear if it was part of the video or an actual accident.

The music video for Friends Turbo was released on 17 April 2011. It was recorded in the Dutch town of Maaskantje, known for being the home of the New Kids. As the track is the theme song of the German version of the film "New Kids Turbo!", the music video is a montage of footage from the film and of band members H.P. Baxxter, Rick J. Jordan, and Michael Simon in Maaskantje. Gerrie, one of the New Kids, hits H.P. with his car, and takes several pictures of himself with him. Following this, the band members drive around the Dutch countryside with Gerrie, wreaking havoc and performing the tune and ignoring the incident that happened before with the car. At the end of the video, the band members leave the town, and Gerrie bids them farewell, shouting key phrases from their older singles like "it's nice to be important, but it's more important to be nice!" and "maximum respect to the whole European posse!" from "Move Your Ass!".

== In other media ==
Dutch hardcore/happy hardcore DJ Paul Elstak did the theme song for the Dutch version of the film. His track was simply known as "Turbo!", and also had a music video featuring the New Kids. Scooter sampled DJ Paul Elstak's "Rainbow in the Sky" in the song "See your smile" which appears on their 2009 album Under the Radar Over the Top.

== Track listings ==
CD single (2-track)
| No. | Title | Length |
|---|---|---|
| 1. | "Friends Turbo" (Movie Version) | 3:20 |
| 2. | "Friends Turbo" | 3:19 |

Download
| No. | Title | Length |
|---|---|---|
| 1. | "Friends Turbo" (Movie Version) | 3:20 |
| 2. | "Friends Turbo" | 3:19 |
| 3. | "Friends Turbo" (Drum & Bass Mix) | 4:02 |

== Charts ==
Chart performance for "Friends Turbo"
| Chart (2011) | Peak position |
|---|---|
| Austria (Ö3 Austria Top 40) | 65 |
| Germany (GfK) | 43 |
