= Melbourne shuffle =

Rave dance from the 1980s

- Dance type: Rave dance
- Year: 1980s–present
- Country: Australia
- Related topics: Rave; Melbourne; Trance music; Electronic music; Hard dance

The Melbourne shuffle is a rave dance that developed in Melbourne, Australia, in the late 1980s and early 1990s. It is characterised by the T-step (a variation of the jazz tick-tock) combined with a variation of the running man, performed with coordinated arm movements. The dance is typically improvised and performed to electronic dance music.

== History ==
The Melbourne shuffle emerged within Melbourne’s late-1980s rave and club scene. During the 1990s and 2000s, it became closely associated with local clubs including Hard Kandy, Bubble, Xpress at Chasers, Heat, Mercury Lounge, Viper, Two Tribes at Chasers and PHD. Early Melbourne techno events such as Biology, Hardware, and Every Picture Tells a Story were also popular with shuffle dancers.

As electronic dance music gained wider exposure, the shuffle spread beyond Melbourne through club culture, media coverage, and online video sharing.

== Technique ==
T-step

A slowed-down running man

The dance involves repeatedly shuffling the feet inward and outward while moving the arms up and down or side to side in time with the beat. Additional elements may include 360-degree spins, jumps, and slides. As described by Vice Media, the core movements combine the T-step with a variation of the running man.

It is often associated with another dance style known as "cutting shapes". Some dancers use talcum powder or apply liquid to the floor to facilitate sliding movements.

== International influence ==
In 2009, the German hard dance group Scooter released the single "J'adore Hardcore", whose music video featured dancers Pae (Missaghi Peyman) and Sarah Miatt performing the Melbourne shuffle in Melbourne. In 2011, American dance music duo LMFAO referenced the shuffle in their hit "Party Rock Anthem".

A related style of shuffling developed in the United Kingdom and by 2012 was widely referred to as "cutting shapes".

In 2014, researchers at Brown University named a computer security algorithm after the Melbourne shuffle. The algorithm deletes traces of users' access on cloud servers by shuffling the location of data on those servers.

== See also ==
- Jumpstyle — Hardstyle dance
