= Stuck on Replay =

Single by Scooter

from the album Under the Radar Over the Top
- B-side: "P.U.C.K."
- Released: 12 March 2010
- Genre: Hardstyle
- Label: Sheffield Tunes
- Songwriter(s): Lionel B. Richie Jr.; H.P. Baxxter; Rick J. Jordan; Michael Simon; Jens Thele

Scooter singles chronology
"The Sound Above My Hair" (2009)	"Stuck on Replay" (2010)	"Friends Turbo" (2011)

Music video
- "Stuck on Replay" (Official video) on YouTube

"Stuck on Replay" is a song by German electronic dance band Scooter. It was released in March 2010 as the fourth single from Under the Radar Over the Top. The song was the official anthem of the 2010 IIHF World Championship in Germany. The single is themed after the IIHF as is the Under the Radar Over the Top tour. The single was also released on the day of the Hamburg concert during the tour.

The song samples the chorus of the 1984 Lionel Richie song "Stuck on You" and the bridge of "A Kay A" by DJ Phil TY.

== History ==
"Stuck on Replay" was originally featured on the album Under the Radar Over the Top. Much speculation rose because footage of Scooter frontman H.P. Baxxter in what appeared to be a music video for the song was released in some promotional material for the album. However, even after the material was released, the third single from Under the Radar Over the Top, "The Sound Above My Hair" was released. A fourth single was still expected, but no word was given until February 2010, when the IIHF announced that "Stuck on Replay" would be the official song of the 2010 IIHF World Championship, giving a one-minute sample along with the press release that sounded different from the album version. It was also announced that "Stuck On Replay" would indeed be the fourth single from Under The Radar Over The Top. Several days later, it was confirmed that the song would be receiving a 2-track and a Maxi release, unlike its predecessor, "The Sound Above My Hair".

== Music video ==
The music video was released on 25 February 2010 on the official Kontor Records website and YouTube. The video is a compilation of short videos of various matches from the 2009 IIHF World Championship and shots of frontman and vocalist H.P. Baxxter singing against different backgrounds, accompanied by background shots of Michael Simon and Rick J. Jordan. The video also features dancers performing the Melbourne Shuffle in city scenes, as well as shots of Lithuanian dancer Giedre Mockeliunaite dancing in various outfits. The city scenes are shot in Salford near Manchester–the salvage garage and gas tanks are shot is in Liverpool Street, Salford, M5 4LG.

An extended version of the music video was released on 5 March 2010, a week before the single's release. The video contains added footage of the dancers doing the Melbourne Shuffle, and is an extra two minutes longer than the original. The extended version of the song contains added beats at the beginning and end of the song, along with longer verses and choruses.

== Commercial performance ==
After the first week of release it entered the German charts at number 34, which was disappointing to many fans as they expected it to enter higher due to the single being released during the tour. It was however expected to climb once the world ice hockey championships start (7 May), as it was the official song of that tournament, but that did not happen. The single also entered the Austrian charts at number 58 after the first week of release.

== Track listings ==
CD single
No.	Title	Length
1.	"Stuck on Replay" (Radio Edit)	3:09
2.	"Stuck on Replay" (Club Mix)	3:25
3.	"Stuck on Replay" (Extended Mix)	3:49
4.	"P.U.C.K."	3:56
5.	"Ti sento" (Official Goal Anthem of the 2010 IIHF World Championship, Germany)	3:55
6.	"Metropolis" (Official Opening Ceremony Anthem of the 2010 IIHF World Championship, Germany)	4:09

CD single (2-track)
No.	Title	Length
1.	"Stuck on Replay" (Radio Edit)	3:09
2.	"Stuck on Replay" (Club Mix)	3:25

Download
No.	Title	Length
1.	"Stuck on Replay" (Radio Edit)	3:09
2.	"Stuck on Replay" (Club Mix)	3:25
3.	"Stuck on Replay" (Extended Mix)	3:49
4.	"P.U.C.K."	3:56
5.	"Ti sento" (Official Goal Anthem of the 2010 IIHF World Championship, Germany)	3:55
6.	"Metropolis" (Official Opening Ceremony Anthem of the 2010 IIHF World Championship, Germany)	4:09

== Charts ==
Chart performance for "Stuck on Replay"
Chart (2010)	Peak position
Austria (Ö3 Austria Top 40)	58
Germany (GfK)	34
