= The Sound Above My Hair =

Single by Scooter

from the album Under the Radar Over the Top
- B-side: "Lucullus"
- Released: 27 November 2009
- Recorded: 2009
- Genre: Hard trance; hard dance
- Length: 3:35
- Label: Sheffield Tunes
- Songwriters: Colin Vearncombe; H. P. Baxxter; Jens Thele; Michael Simon; Rick J. Jordan

Scooter singles chronology
"Ti sento" (2009)	"The Sound Above My Hair" (2009)	"Stuck on Replay" (2010)

Music video
- "The Sound Above My Hair" (Official video) on YouTube

"The Sound Above My Hair" is the third single release from the Scooter album Under the Radar Over the Top, following "J'adore Hardcore" and "Ti sento". "The Sound Above My Hair" was first performed live at The Dome 52. The track used in the single was taken from a sample of "Wonderful Life" by the English alternative rock band Black. In addition, the track also samples the 19th century Shaker hymn, "Simple Gifts" (popularly known from Lord of the Dance). H. P. Baxxter uses Auto-Tune effect while singing.

== Music video ==
The music video premiered on YouTube on 12 November 2009. The video features the members of Scooter riding around the German town of Wernigerode, where they travel around on a Czech military truck with giant speakers attached. The band on the truck attracts people from all over the town that follow the truck as it rides. They are accompanied by scantily clad female bagpipe players, and end up at Wernigerode Castle, where they have a crowd dancing and cheering to the song. A military truck was rented, and the video was shot on location in Wernigerode. Scooter allowed bystanders to be extras in the final scene of the video, where there is a crowd of many people dancing. The music video appeared on Clubland TV on 17 November 2009, and on 18 November the UK distributor of Scooter's music All Around the World uploaded the video to their YouTube channel, suggesting it would be the next UK single. This surprised many people as they were expecting "Ti sento" to be the next UK single. On 24 November, Kontor uploaded an extended version of the video to YouTube, however marked it as a private video. The video was removed several hours later, and uploaded again on 26 November, again as a private video, but this time with a message on Scooter's official website that the video would be released on 27 November. The video was released later that morning.

The video is based on an old German legend, the 'Rattenfänger von Hameln' (The 'Pied Piper' (of Hamelin)). In the legend, there is a rat plague in the town. A rat catcher plays on his flute, and all the rats come out of the houses and follow him and his music out of the town. In the video, Scooter plays on a truck driving through the streets and all the people come and follow them to the castle.

== Samples ==
The song is loosely based on Black's 1985 single "Wonderful Life" altering some of the lyrics.

"Lucullus" contains sample from the 1990 track "The Realm" from C'hantal.

== Track listings ==
CD single
No.	Title	Length
1.	"The Sound Above My Hair" (radio edit)	3:38
2.	"Lucullus"	4:40

Download
No.	Title	Length
1.	"The Sound Above My Hair" (radio edit)	3:38
2.	"The Sound Above My Hair" (electro mix)	7:11
3.	"The Sound Above My Hair" (extended mix)	6:39
4.	"Lucullus"	4:40

== Charts ==
Chart performance for "The Sound Above My Hair"
Chart (2009)	Peak position
Austria (Ö3 Austria Top 40)	74
Germany (GfK)	38
