= Olga Scheps =

German pianist

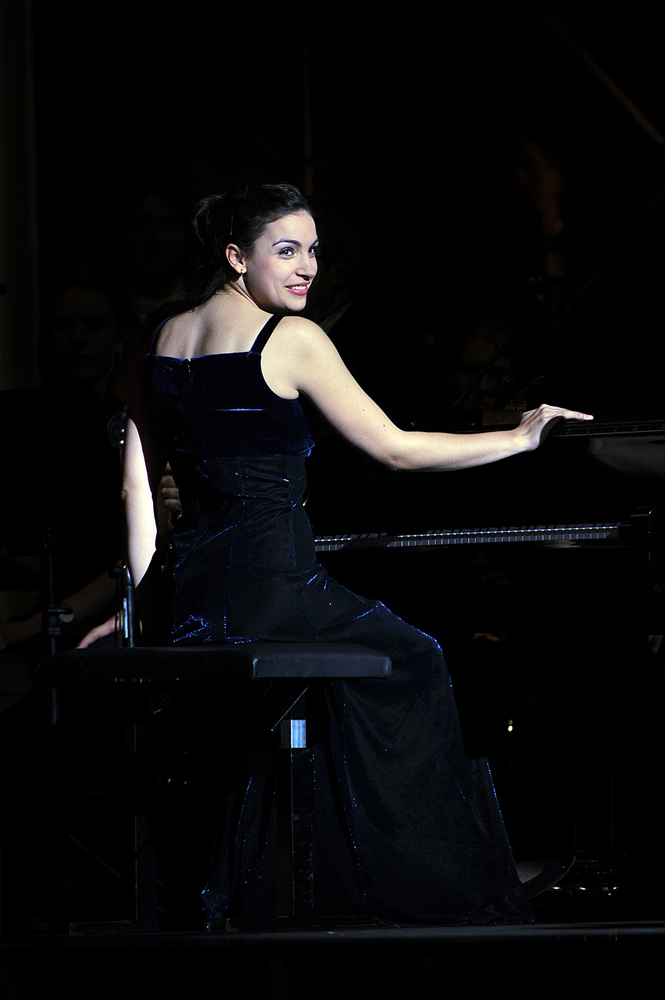
- Olga Scheps at the anniversary ceremony "50 Years of Culture at Audi" on 11 November 2012

Background information
- Born: 4 January 1986 (age 40); Moscow, Russia
- Genre: Classical
- Occupation: Pianist
- Years active: 1998–present
- Label: RCA Red Seal
- Website: www.olgascheps.de

Olga Scheps (born 4 January 1986) is a German pianist, who currently resides in Cologne, Germany.

== Biography ==
=== 1986–2001: Early life and career beginnings ===
Scheps was born on 4 January 1986, in Moscow and came to Germany at the age of six. Her parents were both Ukrainian Jews. Influenced by the musical surroundings of her family, especially of her father Ilya Scheps (a pianist and professor at the Aachen section of the Hochschule für Musik und Tanz Köln) she began piano lessons at the age of four.

Her active concert work started at the age of twelve when already calling attention to herself by winning several first prizes at the German competitions Jugend musiziert in 1999 and Jugend spielt Klassik in 2001. At the age of 14, she debuted with orchestra at the concert series Junge Elite with Prokofiev's Piano Concerto No. 1 at the Tonhalle Düsseldorf, followed by recitals in the concert series Best of NRW and The Next Generation at Harenberg City Center Dortmund.

=== 2002–present: Performing and recording career ===
Over the years, Scheps has performed in Poland, Italy, the Netherlands, Austria, Romania, Denmark, France, Spain, Slovenia, Czech Republic, Sweden, North Macedonia, Switzerland, South Africa, United States, Israel, United Kingdom and in Asia. She made her U.S. debut performing at Majestic Theatre in San Antonio in June 2012 where she played Liszt's Piano Concerto No. 2 with the San Antonio Symphony under the baton of Sebastian Lang-Lessing. Scheps frequently performs recitals at the Berlin Philharmonie, Kölner Philharmonie, Laeiszhalle in Hamburg, Prinzregententheater in Munich, Alte Oper in Frankfurt, Liederhalle in Stuttgart and the Wiener Musikverein, among others. She has worked with orchestras such as the NDR Sinfonieorchester, the Radio-Sinfonieorchester Stuttgart, the Münchner Symphoniker, the Mozarteumorchester Salzburg, the Royal Scottish National Orchestra, the Warsaw National Philharmonic Orchestra, and the Monte-Carlo Philharmonic Orchestra.

She also regularly performs at the Klavier-Festival Ruhr since her debut there in 2007, as well as other renowned festivals such as the Festspiele Mecklenburg-Vorpommern, Heidelberger Frühling, Kissinger Sommer, Mosel Musikfestival, Mozartfest Würzburg, Rheingau Musik Festival, Schleswig-Holstein Musik Festival and Sommerliche Musiktage Hitzacker. Her recital at the "Klavier-Festival Ruhr" in May 2009 was recorded and published in the "Edition Klavier-Festival Ruhr" in cooperation with the Fono Forum magazine.

Scheps signed her first exclusive recording contract with RCA Red Seal (Sony Music). Her debut CD Chopin in 2010 was well received in the German press. On 17 October 2010, she subsequently earned her first ECHO Klassik Award as Newcomer of the Year (Piano) for her debut at the Philharmonie Essen. She released her second album with works by Russian composers in the autumn of 2010. In September 2012, Scheps presented her third album Schubert.

As a chamber performer, Scheps has collaborated with violinists Daniel Hope and Erik Schumann, cellists Adrian Brendel, Alban Gerhardt and Jan Vogler, and violist Nils Mönkemeyer.

Scheps is supported by the Deutsche Stiftung Musikleben and the German National Academic Foundation.

== Artistry ==
=== Repertoire ===
Scheps describes playing the piano "To me, music is an extension of my expressivity, the amplification of my language. The score is predetermined, but I am the interpreter. It is like acting – like the work of an actress who follows a script."

Her repertoire includes many classical works for solo recitals and also piano concertos. It contains her interpretation of the music of the Romanticism, in particular the works of Russian composers, as well as Frédéric Chopin. She is particularly known for her performances as a crystal clear romanticist who delivers a teary-eyed and emotional performance to the audience at her concerts.

She also performs less known repertoire such as Arvo Pärt's Lamentate, Dvořák's Piano Concerto, and Liszt's Malediction.

== Personal life ==
Olga is married and has one daughter, Jana, and one son.

== Discography ==
- Chopin (2010)
- Russian Album (2010)
- Schubert (2012)
- The Chopin Piano Concertos No. 1 & 2 (2014)
- Vocalise
- Satie
- Melody
- Tchaikovsky
- 100% Scooter – Piano Only (2017)
- Family (2021)
- Chopin Nocturne (EP version) with cellist Raphaela Gromes

== Awards ==
- ECHO Klassik as "Newcomer of the Year (Piano)" for Chopin (2010)

== In the media ==
In the realm of marketing, Scheps became an attractive brand ambassador. Since 2011 she has been a brand ambassador for Audi, and the Swiss-based luxury company Chopard. Scheps is the face of German women's magazine COVER which was printed for the first time on 18 August 2012. She was invited to many TV Shows in Germany such as ZDF Morgenmagazin, "Klein gegen Groß" with Kai Pflaume, DAS! NDR rote Sofa, Kölner Treff, "Kleine Nachtmusik" with Götz Alsmann, and Stefan Raab's "TV Total".
