= No Fate =

1991 single by Zyon

Single by Zyon

from the album No Fate
- Released: 1991 (Germany)
- Length: 5:35
- Label: Eye Q Records
- Songwriters: Steffen Britzke, Matthias Hoffmann, René Swain

"No Fate" is a single by Zyon released in 1991/1992.

== Track listing ==
Vinyl

1. "No Fate (No Fate Mix)" – 5:35
2. "No Fate (Continuous Struggle Mix)" – 6:12

Vinyl No Fate Mixes 91-93

1. No Fate (No Fate Mix '93) - 7:40
2. No Fate (Back From Goa Mix '92) - 6:40
3. No Fate (Struggle Continous Mix '91) - 6:12

== Scooter version ==
"No Fate"

Single by Scooter

from the album Rough and Tough and Dangerous – The Singles 94/98
- Released: 1 December 1997 (Germany)
- Recorded: 1997
- Length: 3:28
- Label: Club Tools
- Songwriters: Steffen Britzke, Matthias Hoffmann, René Swain, H.P. Baxxter, Rick J. Jordan, Ferris Bueller, Jens Thele
- Producer: Scooter

Scooter singles chronology
"The Age of Love" (1997)	"No Fate" (1997)	"How Much Is the Fish?" (1998)

Music video
- "No Fate" on YouTube

The German hard dance band Scooter covered it, which was released on 1 December 1997 and featured on their first singles compilation album Rough and Tough and Dangerous – The Singles 94/98.

=== Track listing ===
CD Maxi

1. "No Fate (Single Mix)" – 3:28
2. "No Fate (Full Length)" – 6:24
3. "No Fate (R.O.O.S. Mix 1)" – 7:44
4. "No Fate (R.O.O.S. Mix 2)" – 7:44
5. "No Fate (Trance Mix)" – 7:04

12"

1. "No Fate (Full Length)" – 6:24
2. "No Fate (Trance Mix)" – 7:04
3. "No Fate (R.O.O.S. Mix 1)" – 7:44
4. "No Fate (R.O.O.S. Mix 2)" – 7:44

=== Charts ===
Chart (1997–1998)	Peak position
Austria (Ö3 Austria Top 40)	36
Finland (Suomen virallinen lista)	2
Germany (GfK)	39
Sweden (Sverigetopplistan)	35

== ATB version ==
The German trance DJ ATB covered it for the limited edition of his sixth album, Trilogy, released in 2007.
