= Break It Up (Scooter song) =

1996 single by Scooter

Single by Scooter

from the album Wicked!
- B-side: "Scooter Del Mar"; "Wednesday" (Kontor mix)
- Released: 21 November 1996
- Length: 3:38
- Label: Club Tools
- Songwriter: Nosie Katzmann
- Producer: Scooter

Scooter singles chronology
"I'm Raving" (1996)	"Break It Up" (1996)	"Fire" (1997)

Music video
- "Break It Up" on YouTube

"Break It Up" is a song by German hard dance band Scooter, released on 21 November 1996 by label Club Tools as the second single from their third album, Wicked! (1996). Written by Nosie Katzmann, it was a top-20 hit in several countries, like Austria, Finland and Germany. On the Eurochart Hot 100, it peaked at number 65 in February 1997. In West Asia, it became a top-10 hit in Israel, peaking at number six. The accompanying music video was directed by Rainer Thieding and produced by Chopstick Films, depicting the band performing on a train.

== Critical reception ==
British magazine Music Week gave "Break It Up" a score of four out of five, adding, "Shock of the week – the German trio press pause on their noisy techno and unleash a simple but stunning ballad instead. If radio bites, this could be huge." In a second review two months later, they gave it a full score of five out of five, writing, "This epic ballad, a massive hit on the continent, has been around for two or three months and, with greater familiarity, sounds even more anthemic. It could be massive."

== Track listings ==
- 12-inch
1. "Break It Up" – 3:38
2. "Scooter Del Mar" – 4:58
3. "Wednesday" (Kontor mix) – 6:52
- CD single, France
1. "Break It Up" – 3:38
2. "Wednesday" (Kontor mix) – 6:52
- CD maxi
1. "Break It Up" – 3:38
2. "Break It Up" (Unplugged) – 3:36
3. "Wednesday" (Kontor mix) – 6:52

== Charts ==
=== Weekly charts ===
Weekly chart performance for "Break It Up"
Chart (1996–1997)	Peak position
Austria (Ö3 Austria Top 40)	18
Europe (Eurochart Hot 100)	65
Finland (Suomen virallinen lista)	13
Germany (GfK)	15
Israel (Israeli Singles Chart)	6
Switzerland (Schweizer Hitparade)	44
UK Singles (Official Charts)	83

=== Year-end charts ===
Year-end chart performance for "Break It Up"
Chart (1997)	Position
Germany (Media Control)	98
Romania (Romanian Top 100)	73
