= Marc Trauner =

German DJ and music producer

- Also known as: Marc Acardipane; Mescalinum United; The Mover; Pilldriver; Marshall Masters; Resident E
- Born: 7 April 1969 (age 56)
- Genres: Electronic
- Occupations: Music producer, remixer, DJ
- Years active: 1989–present
- Labels: Planet Core Productions

Marc Trauner (born April 7, 1969) better known by his numerous aliases including Marc Acardipane, Mescalinum United, The Mover, Pilldriver, Marshall Masters and Resident E, is a DJ and producer based in Frankfurt, Germany.

== History ==
Trauner was co-founder of record label Planet Core Productions and the hardcore techno production team with the same name, better known as PCP. He released, as Mescalinum United, "We Have Arrived" in 1990. "We Have Arrived" was remixed by Aphex Twin and two versions of the track appeared on Aphex Twin's album Classics.

He scored a top 20 hit in the UK in collaboration with Scooter in 2003, with the single "Maria (I Like It Loud)", a cover of his 1997 single "I Like It Loud" (Marshall Masters feat. The Ultimate MC).

In 1997/1998 he released his Best Of Album - Best Of Marc Acardipane (1989-1997) (2xCD) and (1989-1998) (CD). This was spread over 2 volumes.

== "We Have Arrived" ==
"We Have Arrived" is a hardcore techno track by Marc Trauner under the alias Mescalinum United. It was first released by Planet Core Productions in 1990 on the Reflections of 2017 EP. The track is often regarded as the first hardcore techno track.

=== Remixes ===
- The Advent remix (5:35)
- Aphex Twin QQT remix (4:24)
- Aphex Twin TTQ remix (5:03)
- Darrien Kelly's 98 retake (4:18)
- DJ Promo remix (6:19)
- Lory D remix (4:24)
- Manu le Malin remix (4:40)
- Miro remix (5:05)
- Rude Awakening remix (4:10)
- The Horrorist remix (4:06)
- The Mover remix
