= J'adore Hardcore =

Single by Scooter

from the album Under the Radar Over the Top
- B-side: "Dushbag"
- Released: 14 August 2009
- Recorded: 2009
- Genre: Hardstyle; jumpstyle; hard trance
- Length: 3:47
- Label: Sheffield Tunes
- Songwriter(s): Alessandro Neri; Domenico Canu; H. P. Baxxter; Jens Thele; Marco Baroni; Michael Simon; Rick J. Jordan; Sergio Della Monica; Simon Anthony Duffy
- Producer(s): Scooter

Scooter singles chronology
"Jump That Rock (Whatever You Want)" (2008)	"J'adore Hardcore" (2009)	"Ti sento" (2009)

"J'adore Hardcore" is a single by German hard dance group Scooter. It was released as the first single from their 2009 album Under the Radar Over the Top on 14 August 2009. Record label All Around the World released the single in the UK on 2 November 2009.

== Music video ==
Pae and Sarah performing the Melbourne Shuffle on the streets of Melbourne, Australia.

The video for the single features footage of a live Scooter concert in Differdange (Luxembourg), dancers Pae (Missaghi Peyman) and Sarah Miatt performing the Melbourne Shuffle on the streets of Melbourne (Australia) and car scenes of H.P. Baxxter, the frontman of Scooter, recorded on Majorca (Spain).

On 30 July 2009, during the video shoot, H. P. Baxxter was almost a victim of a car bomb attack. Band member Michael Simon posted on his Myspace page that Baxxter was not injured in the attack. According to Simon a theft occurred, and Baxxter went to report it to the police. When the police sent him away to find a translator from German to Spanish, Baxxter left, and within minutes the bomb exploded.

The video premiered on the website of Kontor Records on 7 August 2009. An extended version of the video was released to coincide with the single on 13 August 2009. This was the first extended video released by Scooter.

== Track listings ==
CD single
No.	Title	Length
1.	"J'adore Hardcore" (Radio Edit)	3:47
2.	"J'adore Hardcore" ('The Melbourne' Club Mix)	5:51
3.	"J'adore Hardcore" (Extended Mix)	5:39
4.	"J'adore Hardcore" (Megastylez Edit)	3:19
5.	"Dushbag"	4:38

CD single (2-track)
No.	Title	Length
1.	"J'adore Hardcore" (Radio Edit)	3:55
2.	"J'adore Hardcore" (Extended Mix)	5:10

12"
No.	Title	Length
1.	"J'adore Hardcore" ('The Melbourne' Club Mix)	5:51
2.	"J'adore Hardcore" (Extended Mix)	5:39
3.	"J'adore Hardcore" (Megastylez Remix)	6:02
4.	"J'adore Hardcore" (Eric Chase Remix)	5:50

Download
No.	Title	Length
1.	"J'adore Hardcore" (Radio Edit)	3:47
2.	"J'adore Hardcore" ('The Melbourne' Club Mix)	5:51
3.	"J'adore Hardcore" (Extended Mix)	5:39
4.	"J'adore Hardcore" (Megastylez Edit)	3:19
5.	"J'adore Hardcore" (Megastylez Remix)	6:02
6.	"Dushbag"	4:38

== Samples ==
- The spoken words "J'adore hardcore" in the track are performed by French fan Maddy Julien. Julien was contacted via the social networking site Facebook, and was asked to record the sample. She was the first French vocalist in any Scooter song.
- The chorus melody in "J'adore Hardcore" samples the song "Alla Luce Del Giorno" by Ennio Morricone, taken from the 1969 film "Metti, una sera a cena"; the same melody was popularized in the 2001 single "Chase the Sun by Planet Funk.
- "J'adore Hardcore" samples the 2009 song "Lullaby" by Activator and uses a sample that is heavily inspired by the melody of the track "I Just Can't Stop" by The Pitcher. The refrain is inspired by "Düp Düp" by Mickie Krause ("Düp Düp" also samples "Chase The Sun" by Planet Funk). "Düp Düp" was inspired by the Scooter track "The Shit That Killed Elvis", taken from the 2007 album The Ultimate Aural Orgasm. A small part of the lyrics in the beginning of the track are taken from "Proud To Be Loud" by Tat & Zat (AKA Tatanka and Zatox).
- "Dushbag" also samples "Lullaby" by Activator, and Scooter's song "This Is A Monstertune" from their 1996 album Our Happy Hardcore.
- One sound effect in the song was taken from Trans-X's song Living on Video (the chip type effect).
- A voice saying "Ah yeah" is sampled from Here We Go by Run–D.M.C. live at the Funhouse.

== Chart performance ==
Chart performance for "J'adore Hardcore"
Chart (2009)	Peak position
Austria (Ö3 Austria Top 40)	16
European Hot 100 Singles (Billboard)	48
Germany (GfK)	12
Hungary (Single Top 40)	6
Switzerland (Schweizer Hitparade)	90
UK Singles (Official Charts Company)	170
