= Jump That Rock (Whatever You Want) =

Single by Scooter vs Status Quo

from the album Jumping All Over the World – Whatever You Want
- B-side: "The Hi Hat Song"
- Released: 26 September 2008
- Recorded: 2008
- Genre: Jumpstyle
- Length: 3:23
- Label: Sheffield Tunes
- Songwriter(s): Parfitt/Bown; H. P. Baxxter; Rick J. Jordan; Michael Simon; Jens Thele
- Producer(s): Rick J. Jordan; Michael Simon

Scooter singles chronology
"I'm Lonely" (2008)	"Jump That Rock (Whatever You Want)" (2008)	"J'adore Hardcore" (2009)

Status Quo singles chronology
"It's Christmas Time" (2008)	"Jump That Rock (Whatever You Want)" (2008)	"In the Army Now (2010)" (2010)

"Jump That Rock (Whatever You Want)" is a song by German hard dance group Scooter, which is the first single from the repackaged Jumping All Over the World – Whatever You Want, and the fifth overall single from their thirteenth studio album Jumping All Over the World. The song was recorded with British rock group Status Quo, featuring their hit "Whatever You Want".

== Track listings ==
CD maxi
No.	Title	Length
1.	"Jump That Rock (Whatever You Want)" (radio edit)	3:23
2.	"Jump That Rock (Whatever You Want)" ('The Telecaster' Club Mix)	5:51
3.	"Jump That Rock (Whatever You Want)" (extended mix)	5:08
4.	"The Hi Hat Song"	4:40
5.	"Jump That Rock (Whatever You Want)" (music video)	3:24
6.	"Making the Video"	4:20

12"
No.	Title	Length
1.	"Jump That Rock (Whatever You Want)" ('The Telecaster' Club Mix)	5:51
2.	"Jump That Rock (Whatever You Want)" (Extended Mix)	5:08
3.	"The Hi Hat Song"	4:40

Download
No.	Title	Length
1.	"Jump That Rock (Whatever You Want)" (radio edit)	3:23
2.	"Jump That Rock (Whatever You Want)" ('The Telecaster' Club Mix)	5:51
3.	"Jump That Rock (Whatever You Want)" (Extended Mix)	5:08
4.	"The Hi Hat Song"	4:40

UK CD maxi / UK download
No.	Title	Length
1.	"Jump That Rock (Whatever You Want)" (radio edit)	3:23
2.	"Jump That Rock (Whatever You Want)" ('The Telecaster' Club Mix)	5:51
3.	"Jump That Rock (Whatever You Want)" (Extended Mix)	5:08
4.	"Jump That Rock (Whatever You Want)" (Jorg Schmid Remix)	5:20
5.	"The Hi Hat Song"	4:40

== Charts ==
Chart performance for "Jump That Rock (Whatever You Want)"
Chart (2008)	Peak position
Austria (Ö3 Austria Top 40)	19
Germany (GfK)	11
Hungary (Single Top 40)	6
Netherlands (Single Top 100)	91
Switzerland (Schweizer Hitparade)	79
UK Singles (Official Charts Company)	57
