= Ti sento =

1985 single by Matia Bazar

Single by Matia Bazar

from the album Melanchólia
- Language: Italian
- B-side: "Fiumi di parole"
- Released: 1985
- Genre: Synth-pop
- Length: 4:13
- Label: Ariston
- Songwriters: Carlo Marrale; Aldo Stellita; Sergio Cossu
- Producer: Celso Valli

Matia Bazar singles chronology
"Souvenir" (1985)	"Ti sento" (1985)	"Noi" (1987)

"Ti sento" (Italian for 'I feel you') is a song by the Italian pop band Matia Bazar from their 1985 album Melanchólia. It reached number one in Belgian music charts and number two in the Dutch charts. It has been covered multiple times, including by Swedish singer Lena Philipsson as "Jag känner" ('I feel') in 1986. In October 2009, a version by Scooter became an international hit. In October 2023, a remix of the song by Bob Sinclar was released.

== Track listing ==
- Italian 7-inch single
  A. "Ti sento" – 4:13
  B. "Fiumi di parole" – 4:09
- Italian 12-inch single
  A. "I Feel You (Ti sento)" – 6:54
  B. "Ti sento" – 5:40
- German 7-inch single
  A. "I Feel You" – 4:13
  B. "Ti sento" – 4:18
- German 12-inch maxi single
  A. "Ti sento" – 5:40
  B1. "I Feel You (Ti sento)" – 4:18
  B2. "Fiumi di parole" – 4:09

== Charts ==
=== Weekly charts ===
Chart (1985–1986)	Peak position
Belgium (Ultratop 50 Flanders)	1
Europe (European Hot 100 Singles)	33
Italy (Musica e dischi)	2
Netherlands (Dutch Top 40)	2
Netherlands (Single Top 100)	2
West Germany (GfK)	11

== Scooter version ==
"Ti sento"

Single by Scooter featuring Antonella Ruggiero

from the album Under the Radar Over the Top
- B-side: "Scarborough Reloaded"
- Released: 2 October 2009
- Recorded: 2009
- Genre: Jumpstyle
- Length: 3:55
- Label: Sheffield Tunes
- Songwriters: Carlo Marrale; Aldo Stellita; Sergio Cossu
- Producer: Scooter

Scooter singles chronology
"J'adore Hardcore" (2009)	"Ti sento" (2009)	"The Sound Above My Hair" (2009)

Music video
- "Ti sento" on YouTube

"Ti sento" is a single by German techno group Scooter, based on the 1985 song of the same name by Matia Bazar. The single features the former singer of Matia Bazar, Antonella Ruggiero, and was the second release from the 2009 album Under the Radar Over the Top.

=== Track listings ===
CD single
No.	Title	Length
1.	"Ti sento" (radio edit)	3:55
2.	"Ti sento" (V.I.P. Room Club Mix)	5:18
3.	"Ti sento" (Extended Mix)	6:06
4.	"Ti sento" (Lissat and Voltax Remix)	4:30
5.	"Scarborough Reloaded"	3:50

CD single (2-track)
No.	Title	Length
1.	"Ti sento" (radio edit)	3:55
2.	"Scarborough Reloaded"	3:50

12"
No.	Title	Length
1.	"Ti sento" (V.I.P. Room Club Mix)	5:18
2.	"Ti sento" (Lissat & Voltaxx Remix)	7:44
3.	"Ti sento" (Extended Mix)	6:06

Digital
No.	Title	Length
1.	"Ti sento" (Radio Edit)	3:55
2.	"Ti sento" (V.I.P. Room Club Mix)	5:18
3.	"Ti sento" (Extended Mix)	6:06
4.	"Ti sento" (Lissat and Voltax Remix)	7:44
5.	"Scarborough Reloaded"	3:50

=== Music video ===
The 1940s-themed video premiered on 18 September 2009. Shot in a cinematic style, it depicts the three band members, H. P. Baxxter, Rick J. Jordan, and Michael Simon escorting Antonella Ruggiero into an opera house, wearing full formal outfits. They enter through a storm of paparazzi and reporters. Jordan and Simon appear to be securing the premises, as Baxxter goes to a balcony seat. Ruggiero portrays an operatic singer, and she prepares for a large show before a mirror. Jordan spots an attractive woman climbing the stairs, and does not give it a second thought. Ruggiero exits out on the stage, and sings for a full house. Baxxter, Jordan, and Simon watch the show, and they notice an assassin (who is in fact the woman Jordan spotted earlier) poking a high-precision rifle through the curtains on the floor above them. Jordan and Simon run up the stairs to apprehend the shooter, while Baxxter throws himself off the balcony in a failed attempt to take the bullet for Ruggiero. The bullet is fired, and Ruggiero dies in Baxxter's arms at the end of the video, as they escape the opera house.

An extended version of the video premièred 25 September 2009. The video features over two minutes of extra footage, and the extended version of the song. The end of the video shows the reflections of the three band members failed attempts to stop the sniper from killing Ruggiero. The video, like many other Scooter videos, features a historic automobile, this one being a Citroën Traction Avant.

=== Samples ===
"Ti sento" samples the original by Matia Bazar, of which Ruggiero was the lead singer at the time (from 1975 to 1989). The sound effect is from Wildstylez's "Music or noize". The pre-melody also samples Crypsis & Kold Konexion's "Sonic sabotage".

=== Charts ===
Chart performance for "Ti sento"
Chart (2009–2010)	Peak position
Austria (Ö3 Austria Top 40)	27
Czech Republic Airplay (ČNS IFPI)	32
European Hot 100 Singles (Billboard)	33
Germany (GfK)	10
Hungary (Rádiós Top 40)	5
Switzerland (Schweizer Hitparade)	45
