= I'm Raving =

Single by Scooter

from the album Wicked!
- B-side: "B-Site (www.Mix)"; "Loops and Pipes"
- Released: 19 September 1996
- Length: 3:36
- Label: Club Tools
- Songwriter: Marc Cohn
- Producer: Scooter

Scooter singles chronology
"Rebel Yell" (1996)	"I'm Raving" (1996)	"Break It Up" (1996)

Music video
- "I'm Raving" on YouTube

"I'm Raving" is a song by German group Scooter, released in September 1996, by Club Tools, as the lead single from their third album, Wicked! (1996). The song is based on the 1992 Shut Up and Dance track "Raving I'm Raving", which is itself based significantly on the 1991 single "Walking in Memphis" by Marc Cohn. Several lyrics were altered including the line "I'm walking in Memphis" becoming "I'm raving, I'm raving". The song also features a sample of the Scottish traditional song "Scotland the Brave". The accompanying black-and-white music video was directed by Rainer Thieding and produced by Chopstick Films.

== Track listing ==
- CD-maxi
1. "I'm Raving" – 3:36
2. "I'm Raving" (Extended) – 5:06
3. "B-Site" (www.Mix) – 5:35
4. "Loops and Pipes" – 1:22
- CD-maxi (The Remixes)
1. "I'm Raving" (Progressive Remix) – 7:22
2. "I'm Raving" (Taucher Remix) – 9:44
3. "I'm Raving" (Fortunato & Montresor House Remix) – 7:59
4. "I'm Raving" (DB 600 Remix) – 4:49

== Charts ==
=== Weekly charts ===
Weekly chart performance for "I'm Raving"
Chart (1996)	Peak position
Austria (Ö3 Austria Top 40)	4
Europe (Eurochart Hot 100)	16
Europe (European Dance Radio)	20
Finland (Suomen virallinen lista)	2
Germany (GfK)	4
Ireland (IRMA)	19
Israel (Israeli Singles Chart)	10
Latvia (Latvijas Top 50)	20
Netherlands (Dutch Top 40 Tipparade)	2
Netherlands (Single Top 100)	44
Scotland (OCC)	9
Sweden (Sverigetopplistan)	37
Switzerland (Schweizer Hitparade)	13
UK Singles (OCC)	33
UK Pop Tip Club Chart (Music Week)	11

=== Year-end charts ===
Year-end chart performance for "I'm Raving"
Chart (1996)	Position
Europe (Eurochart Hot 100)	83
Germany (Media Control)	60
Latvia (Latvijas Top 50)	194

== Certifications ==
Certifications and sales for "I'm Raving"
Region	Certification	Certified units/sales
Germany (BVMI)	Gold	250,000^{^}
^{^} Shipments figures based on certification alone.
