= I Like It Loud =

1997 song by Marc Acardipane

Single by Marc Acardipane Presents Marshall Masters Feat. The Ultimate MC
- B-side: "Hustler for Life"
- Released: 25 June 1997 (Europe)
- Genre: Hardcore techno
- Length: 6:19 (original mix); 3:37 (radio edit)
- Songwriters: Marc Acardipane; Sir Shawn
- Producer: Marc Acardipane

Marc Acardipane Presents Marshall Masters Feat. The Ultimate MC singles chronology
"Stereo Murder (The Cold Rush Remixes)" (1996)	"I Like It Loud" (1997)	"Don't Touch That Stereo" (1998)

"I Like It Loud" is a song by Marc Acardipane Presents Marshall Masters Feat. The Ultimate MC, released in 1997.

The song was produced and written by Acardipane and was released on Acardipane Records/ID&T. The lyrics "My radio believe me I like it loud" originally come from the LL Cool J song "I Can't Live Without My Radio".

== Track list ==
#	I Like It Loud	Length
1.	"I Like It Loud – Original Mix"	6:19
2.	"Hustler for Life (feat Nasty Django) – Live at the Clux X"	5:31
3.	"Master Anthem – Rave Anthem 1998"	6:30
4.	"I like it Loud – Radio Edit"	3:37

== Chart performance ==
Chart (1998)	Peak position
Belgium (Ultratop 50 Flanders)	3
Netherlands (Single Top 100)	51

== Scooter version ==
"Maria (I Like It Loud)"

Single by Scooter vs. Marc Acardipane & Dick Rules

from the album The Stadium Techno Experience
- B-side: "Giant's Causeway"
- Released: 11 August 2003 (Europe)
- Length: 3:39 (radio edit); 3:55 (album version)
- Songwriters: H.P. Baxxter; Rick J. Jordan; Jay Frog; Jens Thele; Marc Acardipane
- Producers: Scooter; Marc Acardipane

Scooter singles chronology
"The Night" (2003)	"Maria (I Like It Loud)" (2003)	"Jigga Jigga!" (2003)

Music video
- "Maria (I Like It Loud)" on YouTube

In 2003, "I Like It Loud" was covered by German dance group Scooter as "Maria (I Like It Loud)". It was released as the third and final single from their 2003 album The Stadium Techno Experience.

=== History ===
The version made for the single features Marc Acardipane and Dick Rules and is a remixed version of the track featured on the album. The video for the song shows Scooter performing at a night club together with Dick Rules, who acts as MC in the same way as he acts in life performances together with Marc Acardipane. In the charts, the single reached No. 4 in Germany and Austria.

The song is also used by some football clubs to boost atmosphere in the stadium, most notably as the anthem for Romanian team Steaua Bucharest (nowadays used as goal-celebration by FCSB) and as the goal-celebration song for German club Borussia Mönchengladbach, American club Philadelphia Union and Croatian club NK Osijek. The Philadelphia Flyers ice hockey team used it as their goal song from the 2011 Stanley Cup playoffs until the end of the 2012/13 season. Slovan Bratislava uses the song as their regular goal song during home matches. It was also used in darts by Alan Norris who used it as his walk-on music during 2016. As of the 2021/22 season, it is used as the goal song of Dutch football clubs SBV Excelsior and TOP Oss. As of 2020 it has been used by Rangers FC whenever a goal is scored. As of June 2023 it is used as the goal song of the Austria national football team. Beginning with the 2023 season, the Indianapolis Colts use the song after each touchdown scored at Lucas Oil Stadium.

=== Track listing ===
#	Maria (I Like It Loud)	Length
1.	"Maria (I Like It Loud) – Radio Edit"	3:39
2.	"Maria (I Like It Loud) – Club Mix"	6:11
3.	"Maria (I Like It Loud) – Extended"	5:08
4.	"Giant's Causeway"	3:47

=== Trivia ===
- During the shooting of the music video, H.P. Baxxter met his future wife.

=== Chart performance ===
Chart (2003–2004)	Peak position
Austria (Ö3 Austria Top 40)	1
Belgium (Ultratop 50 Flanders)	38
Denmark (Tracklisten)	12
Germany (GfK)	4
Hungary (Single Top 40)	2
Hungary (Dance Top 40)	1
Netherlands (Dutch Top 40)	26
Romania (Romanian Top 100)	93
Scotland Singles (Official Charts)	11
Sweden (Sverigetopplistan)	21
Switzerland (Schweizer Hitparade)	21
UK Singles (Official Charts)	16
UK Dance (Official Charts)	30
UK Indie (Official Charts)	5

=== Year-end charts ===
Chart (2003)	Position
Austria (Ö3 Austria Top 40)	15
Germany (Media Control GfK)	33

=== Certifications ===
Region	Certification	Certified units/sales
Germany (BVMI)	Platinum	300,000^{‡}
^{‡} Sales+streaming figures based on certification alone.

== Other covers ==
- In 2002 was covered by the Club Robbers as a Hardstyle version and in 2007 the hard trance band Cosmic Guys covered the song. Marc Acardipane played the song with Dick Rules on a single in 2003.
- Canadian electronicore band Abandon All Ships recorded a short cover of this song.
- Kickboxer Gago Drago uses a version of the song remixed by Redman which includes portions of his Smash Sumthin song.
