= H. P. Baxxter =

German musician (born 1964)

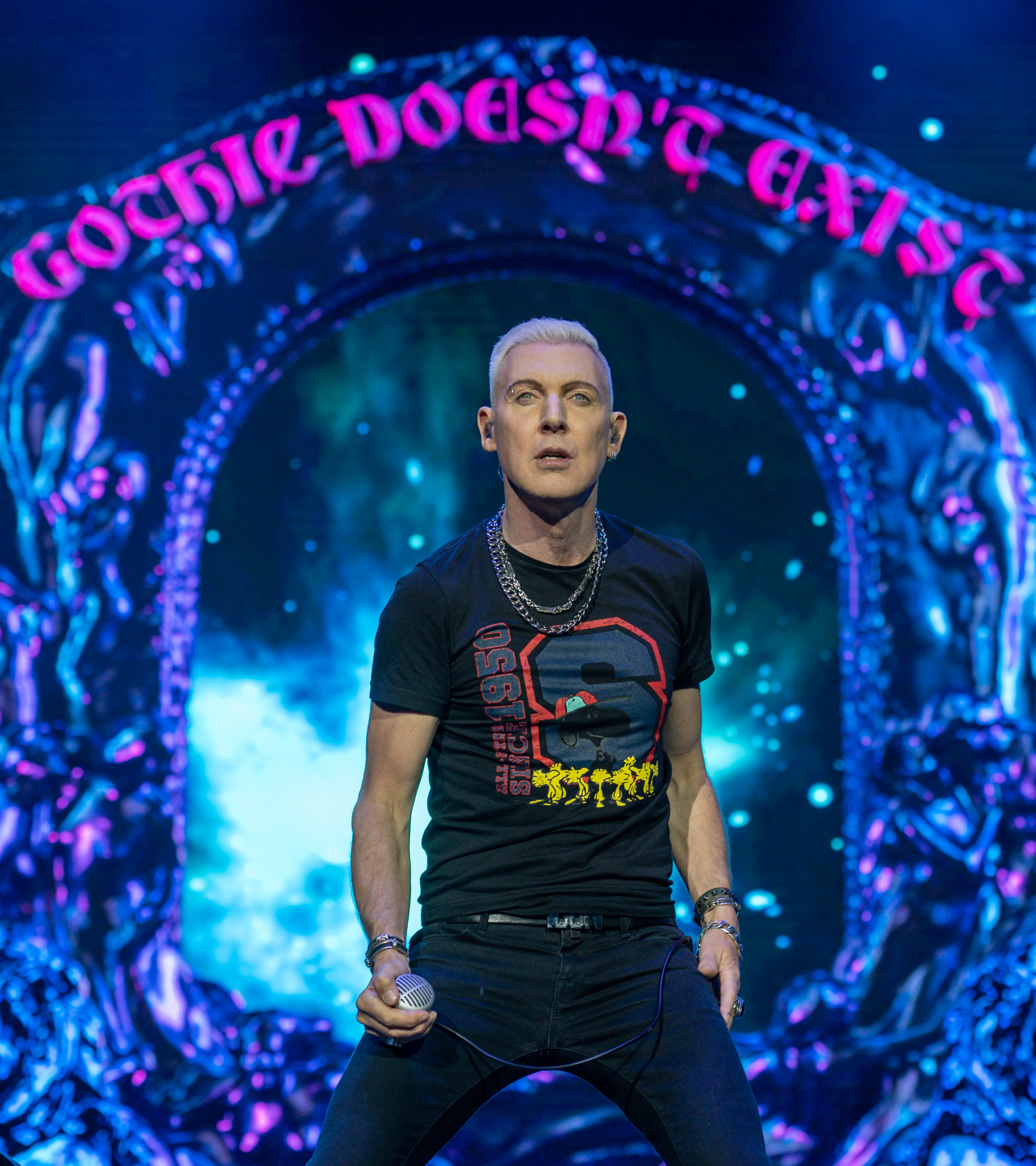
- H. P. Baxxter in 2022

Background information
- Born: Hans Peter Geerdes; 16 March 1964 (age 62); Leer, West Germany
- Genres: Techno, trance, happy hardcore, hardcore techno, Eurodance, synthpop (early)
- Occupations: Singer, rapper, musician
- Instruments: Vocals, guitar
- Years active: 1985–present
- Member of: Scooter
- Formerly of: Celebrate the Nun; The Loop
- Spouses: Simone Mostert (m. 2006; div. 2011) Sara (m. 2024)
- Website: scootertechno.com

Hans Peter Geerdes (born 16 March 1964), professionally known by his stage name H. P. Baxxter, and sometimes by his nickname Dave, is a German musician best known as the lead vocalist of the German techno band Scooter. He founded Scooter with his friend Rick J. Jordan in 1993.

== Early life ==
After completing high school, Baxxter moved to Hanover hoping to secure an apprenticeship. When he was unsuccessful, he enrolled to study law at the local university, though he attended infrequently and soon dropped out. Instead of continuing his studies, Baxxter took on various jobs and played in a Synth-pop band. Eventually, he moved to Hamburg, where he worked at a record label.

== Music career ==
In 1987, Baxxter started the band Celebrate the Nun with Rick J. Jordan and Baxxter's sister, Britt Maxime. Their single "Will You Be There" from the album Meanwhile reached No. 2 on the Autobahn Dance/Club Play chart on 23 June 1990, and the single "She's a Secretary"/"Strange" reached No. 12 on the Dance/Club Play chart on 8 December that year.

In 1993, former members of Celebrate the Nun joined Baxxter's cousin Orion (Ferris Bueller) to form a remix team known as The Loop, which continued until 1998.

In December 1993, Baxxter, along with Celebrate the Nun member Rick J. Jordan and Baxxter's cousin and The Loop member Ferris Bueller, formed the group Scooter.

Baxxter joined Guildo Horn, Jeanette Biedermann, Sylvia Kollek, and Tobias Künzel on the German jury for the Eurovision Song Contest 2009. In 2010, he was announced as the official German representative for the 2010 IIHF World Championship.

Baxxter served as one of the judges on the German version of the X Factor in season 3.

On 9 November 2025 Baxxter became the first original artist to perform an NFL touchdown celebration song live when he performed I Like It Loud #Scooter version at the Olympiastadion (Berlin) during the Indianapolis Colts vs Atlanta Falcons NFL football game following an Indianapolis touchdown during the first quarter.

Baxxter remains active, including live performances such as Parookaville.

== Personal life ==
Baxxter is an automotive enthusiast and many Scooter music videos feature classic cars, including models like a 1961 Jaguar Mark 2 and a 1973 Jaguar E-Type V12. He owns and collects numerous vintage British cars. An Anglophile, he grew up watching English television and listening to English music, claiming he has "always liked the dignified English way of life."

On 6 May 2006, he married his girlfriend Simone Mostert. This was his second marriage, though relatively little is known about his first. In 2011, H. P. and Simone divorced one day before The Stadium Techno Inferno tour.

On 7 June 2024, H. P. announced that he had married his girlfriend Sara, marking his third marriage.

== Television ==
In 1998, he appeared as himself in the Alarm für Cobra 11 episode "Tödlicher Ruhm" (Deadly Fame).
