= Real Life (Crown of Creation album) =

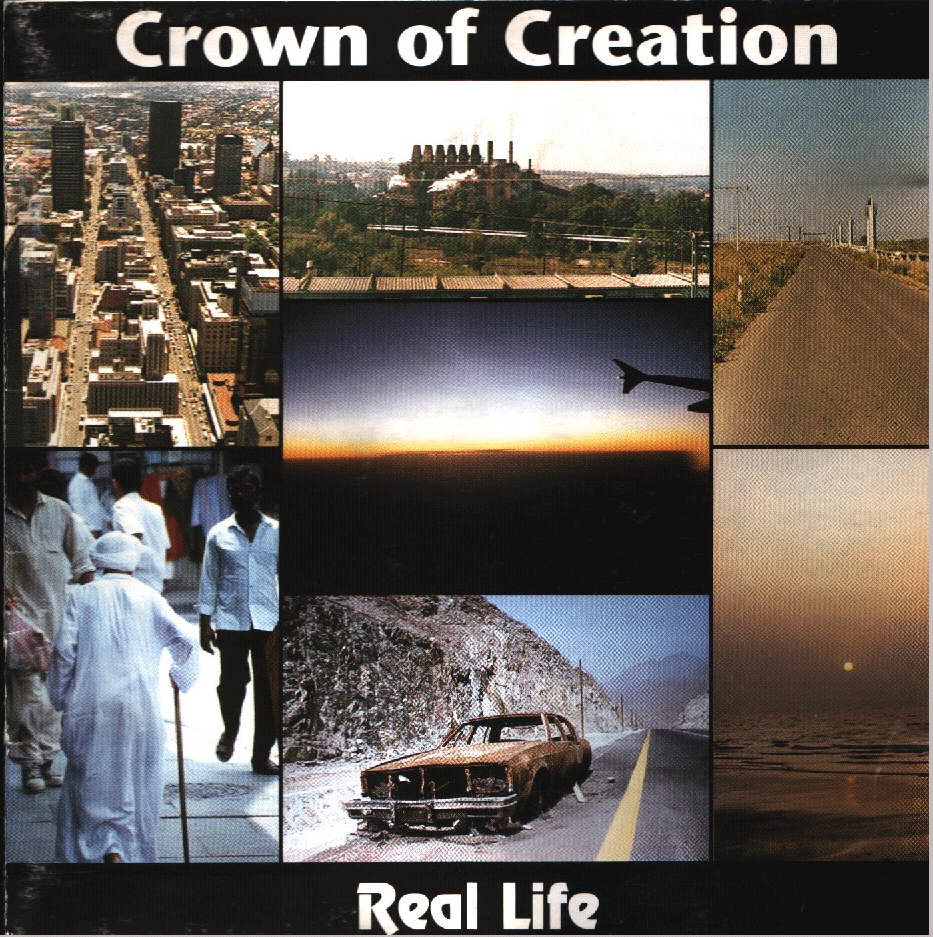

Studio album by Crown of Creation
- Released: 1994
- Recorded: May 27, 1993, to October 1993
- Genre: Synthpop
- Length: 63:53
- Label: ContraPunkt
- Producer: Rick J. Jordan, Martin Zwiener

Crown of Creation chronology
Real Life (1994)	Crown of Creation Meets Friends (1998)

Real Life is the debut album released by West German synthpop/pop group Crown of Creation on February 21, 1994, by ContraPunkt, Bückeburg. It was Rick J. Jordan's last production before founding Scooter together with H.P. Baxxter.

As the recordings began, the band was already eight years old. Singer Nicole Sukar had just joined the band on September 2, 1992. The recordings started on May 27, 1993. Frank Suchland took the CD into his publishing program. It was published on the label ContraPunkt on February 21, 1994. The CD cover was designed by the artist Ingo A. Müller from Bremen who processed impressions of his trip to America.

In October 1994, Crown of Creation presented the CD in their first tour in France to the general public.

Separates out later was given the title "Memory" for the charity compilation in favor of injured children because of fire "Paulinchen" (2001, there track # 1). "Frustsong", a composition by Silke Kasten, Matthias Blazek and Jordan, had already been published in 1985 by Die Matzingers on their tape "Neandertal". For the CD EP Darkness in Your Life (2010) Crown of Creation played the title with singer Anne Crönert again.

== Reviews ==
Reviews of the album are generally positive, with one reviewer calling it "an interesting and distinctive sound of the 90s." The Cellesche Zeitung said: "Out now came a popular rock-pop mixed with catchy melodies, underpinned by carefully arranged synthesizers." The Steinhuder Meerblick wrote: "'Ohne ein Wort' is German-speaking, and was penned by the singer who can easily compete in this title with Juliane Werding." The Wathlinger Bote reported: "Almost an entire year of preparation, the group around the people from Adelheidsdorf Matthias Blazek and Thomas Czacharowski has taken to complete the works." The "General-Anzeiger" in Stadthagen wrote: "Hannes Schäfer, bassist of the successful Hanover Band Fury in the Slaughterhouse, had offered his support for the studio production, a collaboration did not come about for scheduling reasons." Bild Hannover reported: "The CD 'Real Life' is now already sold out, the band is now back in the Roxxon-Studio." magaScene Hannover wrote: "Nicci Knauer is the new singer of Crown of Creation. On the first CD, 'Real Life', she sang in the background."

== Track listing ==
- All songs written by Matthias Blazek and Thomas Czacharowski. "Ohne ein Wort" is written by Nicole Sukar.

No.	Title	Length
1.	"Empty Life"	5:48
2.	"Poison"	4:28
3.	"Story of Life"	4:26
4.	"Running to the Top"	5:01
5.	"My Story"	4:58
6.	"No Time to hesitate"	4:57
7.	"Memory"	4:27
8.	"No Problem"	5:05
9.	"Running to the Top Rick J. Jordan Extended mix"	5:52
10.	"Ohne ein Wort"	5:04
11.	"Mister of the Beat"	5:44
12.	"Liberation"	3:52
13.	"Frustsong"	4:00

== Personnel ==
=== Crown of Creation ===
- Nicole Sukar (Nikk): vocals
- Matthias Blazek: synthesizer, vocals on "Mister of the Beat"
- Thomas Czacharowski: synthesizer

=== Additional musicians ===
- Rick J. Jordan: Moog synthesizer/string section
- Nicole Knauer: backing vocals
- Silvia Lohmann: saxophone
- Christoph von Storch: guitar
- Bernd Wullkotte: guitar

== Production ==
- Produced by Rick J. Jordan (Ambience Studio, Hanover, all tracks except 1, 7 & 12), Herman Frank (Frida Park Studio, Hanover, 4, 7 & 8) and Martin Zwiener (Suono-Tonstudio, Bückeburg, 1 & 12)
- Recorded & engineered by Rick J. Jordan
- Technical assistance: Thomas Czacharowski
- Mixed by Jens Lüpke & Rick J. Jordan

== Bibliography ==
- Matthias Blazek: Das niedersächsische Bandkompendium 1963–2003 – Daten und Fakten von 100 Rockgruppen aus Niedersachsen. Celle 2006, pp. 46–47 ISBN 978-3-00-018947-0
