= Monoblock =

Monoblock can refer to:

- A type of air conditioner
- A monoblock LNB (low-noise block down-converter)
- Monoblock PC, a computer workstation
- A mono (one channel) audio power amplifier
- In photography, another name for a monolight, a type of electronic flash with the electronics in the head, as opposed to a pack-and-head system

== See also ==
- Monoblock Industry of Imagineering
- Monobloc (disambiguation)
- Block (disambiguation)
- Mono (disambiguation)
