= Monobloc =

Monobloc may refer to anything made of a single block or casting. Thus:

- Monobloc engine, an internal combustion engine with the cylinder head and block formed as one unit
- Monobloc (chair), a type of light-weight chair made of one piece of injection-moulded plastic

Also:

- Monobloc (film), a 2005 Argentine film
- Antoinette Monobloc, a pre-WWI French military monoplane
- Monoblock LNB, a type of low-noise block downconverter
- In photography, another name for a monolight, a type of electronic flash with the electronics in the head, as opposed to a pack-and-head system

== See also ==
- Monoblock (disambiguation)
- Mono (disambiguation)
- Bloc (disambiguation)
