= Crown of Creation (disambiguation) =

Crown of Creation is a 1968 album by the American rock band Jefferson Airplane, and is also the name of a song from that album.

Crown of Creation may also refer to:

- Crown of Creation (band), a German synthpop group whose name was inspired by the Jefferson Airplane album
  - Crown of Creation Meets Friends, a 1998 album by the German synthpop group
- "Crown of Creation", a 1994 song by the British rock band Ride
