= Will You Be There (disambiguation) =

"Will You Be There" is a 1993 song by Michael Jackson.

It may also refer to:

- "Will You Be There" (Celebrate the Nun song), a 1989 song
- "Will You Be There" (Jeanette song), a 2000 song
- "Will You Be There (In the Morning)", a 1993 song by Heart
- Will You Be There?, a 2016 South Korean film
