= Darkness in Your Life =

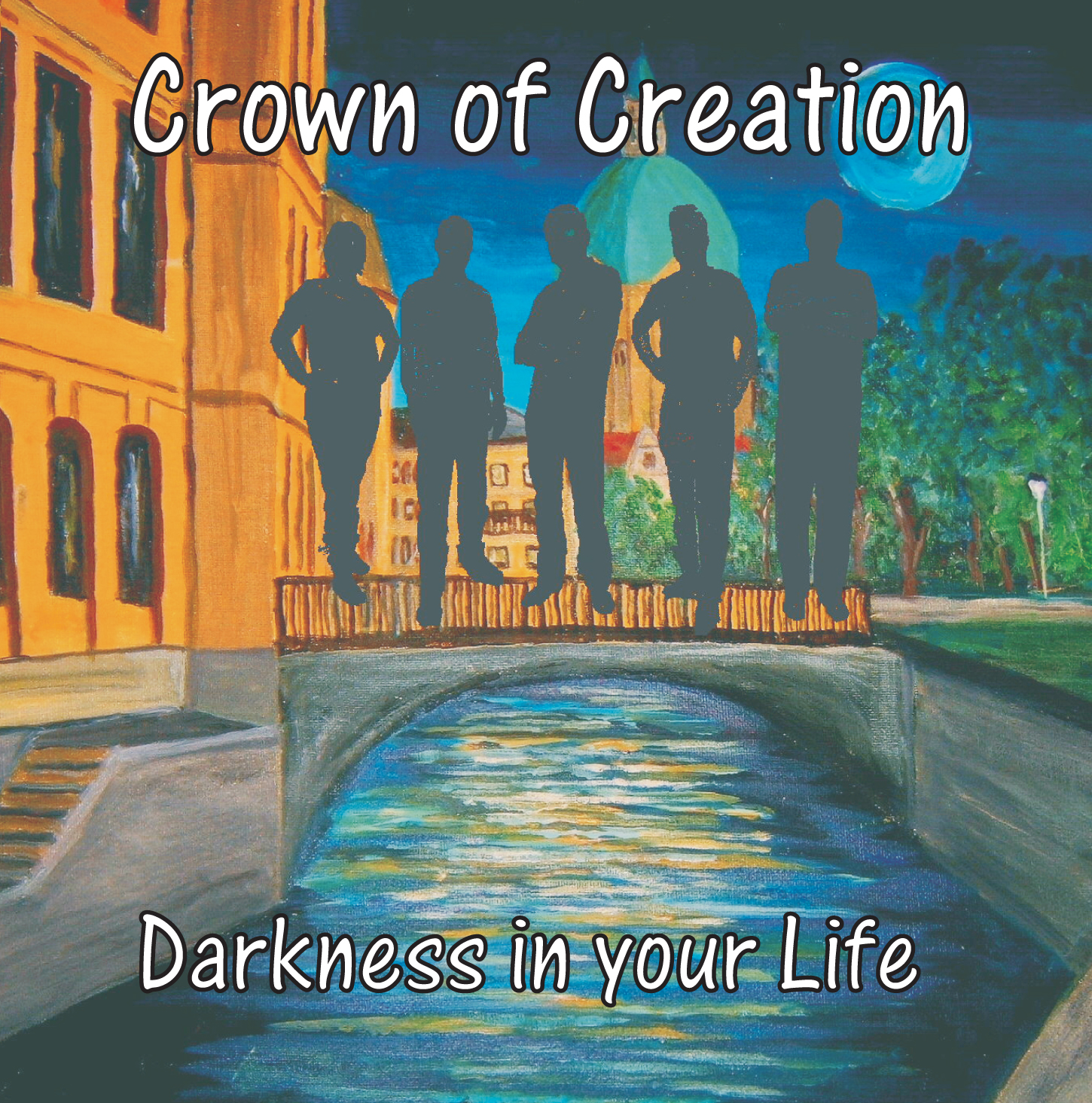

Studio album by Crown of Creation
- Released: August 18, 2010
- Recorded: March 31, 2010 to July 28, 2010
- Genres: Pop, synthpop
- Length: 17:17
- Label: HOFA GmbH
- Director: Frank Simml
- Producer: Adrian Lesch

Crown of Creation chronology
Crown of Creation Meets Friends (1998)	Darkness in Your Life (2010)

Darkness in Your Life is a four-song CD EP by West German synthpop/pop group Crown of Creation. It was released on August 18, 2010, and produced by Adrian Lesch.

== Track listing ==
- "Darkness in Your Life" was written by Anne Crönert and Adrian Lesch. "Run away" is written by Sabine Mertens. "Fallen Angel" is written by Thomas Czacharowski. "Frustsong" is written by Silke Kasten, Matthias Blazek and Rick J. Jordan.

No.	Title	Length
1.	"Darkness in your Life"	4:01
2.	"Run away"	4:15
3.	"Fallen Angel"	4:36
4.	"Frustsong" (Version 2010)	4:17
Total length:		17:17

== Personnel ==
=== Crown of Creation ===
- Anne Crönert: Vocals
- Matthias Blazek: Synthesizer
- Thomas Czacharowski: Synthesizer
- Adrian Lesch: Synthesizer
- Olaf Oppermann: Guitar

== Production ==
- Produced by Adrian Lesch in Hannover-Ahlem
- Recorded & Engineered by Adrian Lesch
- Technical Assistance: Thomas Czacharowski
- Mixed by Adrian Lesch

== Tracks on samplers ==
- 2012: Celle's Integrationsprojekt präsentiert: Made in Ce (with Run away), sampler dedicated to the Children's hospice in the Landkreis Celle
