= Pipkin =

Earthenware cooking pot

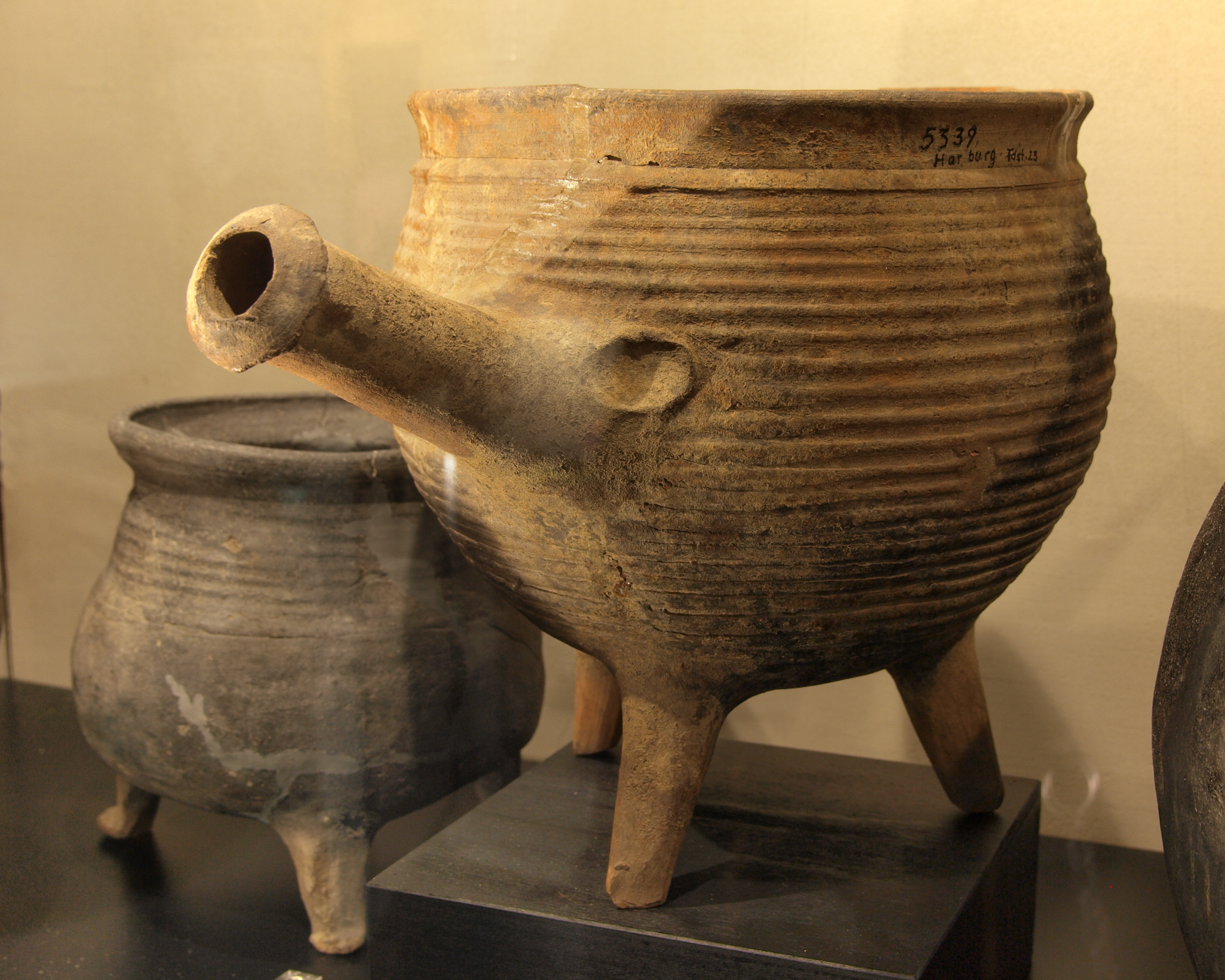
Medieval pipkins found in Hamburg/Germany (1200-1400).

A pipkin is an earthenware cooking pot used for cooking over direct heat from coals or a wood fire. They were not held in direct flame which would crack the ceramic. It has a handle and many (though not all) examples had three feet. Late medieval and post-medieval pipkins had a hollow handle into which a stick might be inserted for manipulation. Examples exist unglazed, fully glazed, and glazed only on the interior.

While often spheroidal, they were made with straight outwardly-sloping sides. They were occasionally made with lids or pouring spouts.

== Heraldry ==
The pipkin, also called a three-legged pot (marmite (fr.), Grapen (ger.)), is sometimes used as a charge in heraldry. It is especially common in arms in Brandenburg, Pomerania and East Prussia.

It is used in the canting arms for the German families von Grape, Grapengießer and Grappendorf, and Groppe von Gudenberg.

Estorf (Landkreis Stade)

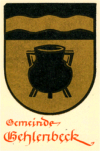
Gehlenbeck

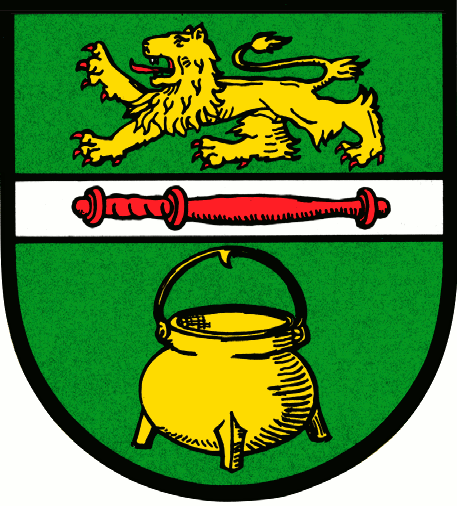
Samtgemeinde Wathlingen

Wathlingen

== See also ==
- List of cooking vessels
