= Bowens International =

Photography companies of the United Kingdom

Bowens International was founded as Bowens Camera Service Company, a London-based camera repair company, in 1923 which by the 1950s had grown to be one of the largest in Europe. In 1963, the name Bowens International LTD. was registered. In June 2016 German investment firm AURELIUS bought Bowens, and in July 2017, AURELIUS closed down the company, discontinuing all further operations.

== Company history ==
Bowens manufactured lighting equipment for photographers. The first flash bulb units were produced in 1947 and in 1950 the company started to produce its first electronic studio flash systems.

Until the 1960s, studio flash systems were large and cumbersome, requiring bulky power generators to power the flash heads, connected by large cables. In 1963, Bowens invented the first electronic studio flash unit with its power source built into it. This became known as a monobloc (sometimes monolite) which is now an industry standard tool.

Following this invention the company dedicated itself to the design and production of studio flash equipment, Bowens Sales & Service grew out of the Bowens Camera service company and in 1966 they made their first appearance at photokina showing their products to the worldwide photography community and taking their first steps towards global distribution.

In 1968 they produced an update to the Monobloc, The Monolite 400 and later products such as Quad, Prolite and Esprit have also proved popular amongst photographic professionals.

The company produced studio flash systems and photographic accessories, designed in Colchester, England and manufactured at its factory in Suzhou, China from 2010. The main competitors of Bowens International included Broncolor, Profoto, Elinchrom, Multiblitz, Visatec and White Lightning.

The company was acquired together with Calumet in June 2016 by the German based venture capitalists Aurelius in June 2016 and then entered liquidation in July 2017 citing competitive pressures. RSM Restructuring Advisory LLP were appointed liquidators of the company on 16 August 2017. 26 staff lost their job in the UK and the factory in China was closed.

== Products ==
Bowens offered many products, ranging from their compact flash units, to their softboxes and accessories. The Bowens S fitting remains a widely used standard for attaching modifiers to flash heads.

== Litebook ==
In July 2008 Bowens published the first issue of litebook, a quarterly magazine devoted to profiling photographers and photographic studios working with Bowens lighting products.

== Bowens TV ==
Bowens YouTube channel showed the latest news regarding the company and its products. A series of five-minute tutorials called "Hough To" (A pun on the surname of the presenter Christian Hough) show a variety of creative lighting techniques using Bowens products. A series of short videos entitled "Behind the Picture" (the company's strapline) follow photographers as they set up and work on shots.
