= She's a Secretary =

Single by Celebrate the Nun

from the album Meanwhile
- Released: 1990
- Recorded: 1989
- Genre: Synth-pop
- Label: Enigma Records
- Songwriter(s): H. P. Baxxter, Rick J. Jordan, Britt Maxime, Slin Tompson
- Producer(s): Achim Völker

Celebrate the Nun singles chronology
"Will You Be There" (1989)	"She's a Secretary" (1990)	"Patience" (1991)

"She's a Secretary" is a song by the German synthpop band Celebrate the Nun, released in 1990 as the third single from their 1989 debut album Meanwhile. The song peaked at No. 12 on the Billboard Dance Play Chart on the week of December 8, 1990.

== Track listing ==
CD single (U.S., 1990)

1. "She's a Secretary" (Gothic Mix) - 5:29
2. "She's a Secretary" (Gothic Dub) - 3:39
3. "She's a Secretary" (Nonne Mix) - 4:10
4. "She's a Secretary" (Monja Mix) - 5:35
5. "She's a Secretary" (Spastic Dub) - 6:04
6. "Strange" - 5:10
7. "Will You Be There" (12" Version) - 5:29
