= Omunanansi =

Ugandan pineapple juice

- Region or state: Uganda
- Created by: Baganda people
- Main ingredients: Pineapple peel and flesh; Water; Ginger; Tea leaves; Sugar or honey

Omunanansi, also known as Munanansi, is a non-alcoholic beverage traditionally made in Uganda from boiling pineapple peels, ginger, and tea leaves. It is made for both commercial and non commercial consumption. It was first adopted by the Baganda, who combined pineapple juice with tea leaves. It is noted for its distinctive sweet and tangy flavor and is often considered a natural alternative to industrial soft drinks.

== Etymology ==
Omunanasi is derived from the Luganda word ananansi, meaning pineapple. In Luganda grammar, the prefix omu- demotes a singular noun, indicating a drink or product made from pineapple.

== Preparation ==
Omunanansi is prepared by boiling pineapple peels and pieces of fruit with ginger and tea leaves. The mixture is simmered for an extended period to extract colour, flavor, and nutrients and nutrients, resulting in a dark- brown, a romantic drink. It may be served hot or chilled and can be sweetened with sugar or honey according to taste.

=== Method ===
- Thoroughly wash ripe pineapples to ensure that the peel is clean.
- Smash the pineapple to make it juicy.
- Cut the pound pineapple in small and even pieces (both the flesh and the peels).
- Add the cut pieces and juice into a saucepan and add water.
- Boil the mixture for about two hours at a high temperature until it browns.
- Add a palm full of grated ginger and tea leaves and let it continue to boil for between 15 and 30 minutes.
- When it is ready, remove the saucepan from heat and let it cool.
- Sieve out the unwanted pieces so only juice remains.
- Add sugar or honey if desired, then serve hot or chilled.

== Commercial production ==
Omunanasi is a source of income for various small-scale vendors in Uganda. One 2025 feature reports a vendor selling omunanansi at a profit of Shs15,000 per jerrycan and selling about 20 liters on good days. Vendors invest relatively little capital, locally available ingredients, and may generate income from sales. Vendors describe higher demand during hot seasons.The drinks is also commonly sold in kiosks in suburban areas and may be packaged in polythene bags for distribution.

Media reports also describe packaged versions of the drink. In 2025, a product labeled “Munanansi – Iced Pineapple Drink” was described as a modern adaptation of the traditional beverage.
