= Mono =

Mono may refer to:

== Biology ==
- Infectious mononucleosis, also known as glandular fever ("the kissing disease")
- Monocyte, a type of leukocyte (white blood cell)
- Monodactylidae, members of which are referred to as monos

== Technology and computing ==
- Mono (audio), single-channel sound reproduction
- Mono (software), a software framework

== Music ==
=== Performers ===
- Mono (British band), an electronic band
- Mono (Japanese band), an instrumental band
- MONO, Vietnamese male singer and Sơn Tùng M-TP's younger brother
- Miky Mono, former member of Mono Inc., a German gothic rock band
- Richard Targett and the Monos, a side-project to The Trudy

=== Albums ===
- Mono (Alpha Wolf album) or the title song, 2017
- Mono (Fury in the Slaughterhouse album), 1993
- Mono (K.Flay album), 2023
- Mono (The Icarus Line album), 2001
- Mono (Lena Katina album) or the title song, 2019
- Mono (The Mavericks album), 2015
- Mono (mixtape), by RM, 2018
- Mono, by Paul Westerberg, packaged with Stereo, 2002

=== Songs ===
- "Mono" (Courtney Love song), 2004
- "Mono", by Fightstar from They Liked You Better When You Were Dead, 2005
- "Mono", by Monrose from Ladylike, 2010
- "Mono", by Whitechapel from Our Endless War, 2014
- "Mono" (I-dle song), 2026

== Places ==
=== United States ===
- Mono or Mono Mills, California, a ghost town
- Mono County, California
  - Mono Village, Mono County, California, a former settlement
- Mono Lake, California
- Mono Pass, Yosemite National park, California

=== Elsewhere ===
- Mono Department, Benin
- Mono, Ontario, Canada, a town
- Monó, Romania, a village
- Mono Island, Solomon Islands
- Mono River, Togo

== Ethnicities and languages ==
- Mono people, an ethnic group of California
  - Mono language (California)
- Mono people (Congo), an ethnic group the Democratic Republic of the Congo
  - Mono language (Congo)
- Mono language (Cameroon)
- Mono language (Solomon Islands), a dialect of Mono-Alu

== Other uses ==
- Mono-, a numerical prefix representing anything single
- Mono (footballer), Spanish footballer
- BAC Mono, a British sports car which began production in 2011
- Mono, a character in the video game Little Nightmares II
- Mono, a character in the video game Shadow of the Colossus
- Mono, a 2016 American film featuring Sam Lerner
- Mono (manga), a Japanese manga series
- Monofilament fishing line
- Monogamy, a relationship structure
- Monosexuality, sexual attraction to one gender
- Monomorphism, in abstract mathematics
- Order of Mono, a Togolese order of chivalry
- José María Gatica (1925–1963), Argentine boxer nicknamed "El Mono"

== See also ==
- Non-mono (disambiguation)
