= Crown of Creation (band) =

German band

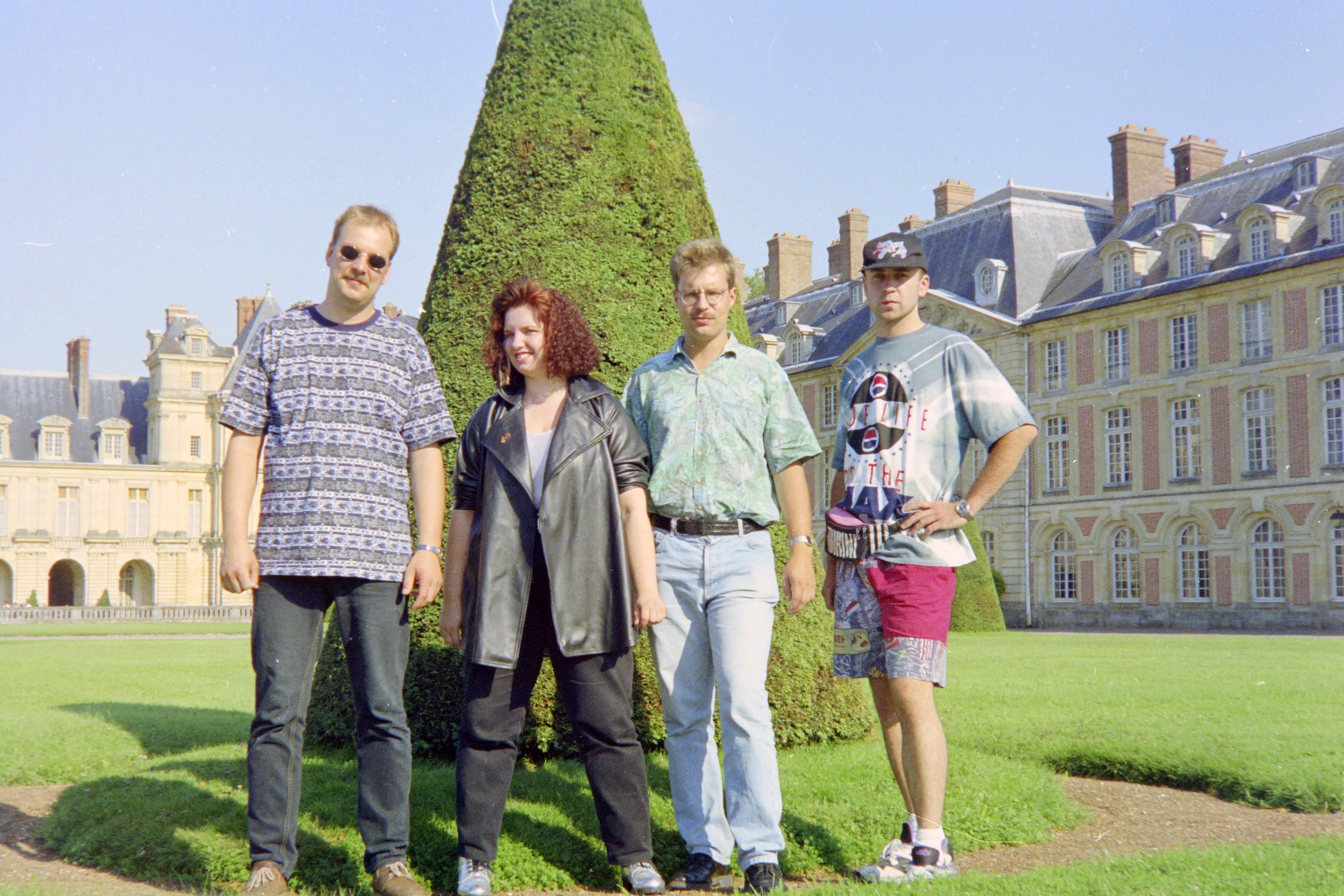
- In Fontainebleau, France, 1995

Background information
- Origin: Hanover, West Germany
- Genres: Pop music, Synthpop
- Years active: 1985–1998, 2009-present
- Labels: ContraPunkt; Calygram Records
- Members: Matthias Blazek; Thomas Czacharowski
- Past members: Anne Crönert; Nicole Knauer; Adrian Lesch; Olaf Oppermann; Nicole Sukar
- Website: matthias-blazek.eu

Crown of Creation is a band from Hanover, Germany. The band developed its own musical style: pop music with strong trance influences.

== Biography ==
Crown of Creation was founded in 1985. The band’s name was inspired by the album Crown of Creation by Jefferson Airplane.

The band began in Großmoor (part of the municipality of Adelheidsdorf) and moved to Hanover in 1987. After numerous line-up changes and many recordings, the band went into the studio of Rick J. Jordan (Scooter) in 1993 with Nicole Sukar and recorded, with the help of the record producer Herman Frank (Victory), their first CD Real Life. Following that release in 1994, Olaf Oppermann was the band's guitarist.

In 1994 and 1995, the band was in the French département of Seine-et-Marne, near Paris, on tour. In 1998, the band dissolved. Eleven years later, Crown of Creation came together again in 2009, with a new singer, Anne Crönert.

In 2010, the CD EP Darkness in your Life was produced and, in conjunction with the Dance Factory from Lachendorf, a video was developed. In May 2010, over several weeks, a series ran with the story of Crown of Creation in the Wathlinger Bote and the Wathlinger Echo, which presented the facts and news from the past 25 years.

For Christmas 2010, the band gave their hometown of Hanover the song "At Christmas Time".

The children’s choir of the primary school of Adelheidsdorf performed with the band in August 2011 in a studio in Hanover to sing the chorus of "Child's Eyes" with three German-language passages. In 2012, Crown of Creation contributed a new and unreleased song to the charity compilation Made in Ce(lle) in support of the children's hospice work and even worked with the lead in the production and marketing of the sampler.

In 2013, the CD maxi With the Rhythm in my Mind was released. On this occasion, the video production company emovion produced the video of the main title and another one of the songs, "Child’s Eyes".

On August 18, 2015, Hofa GmbH label released the best of album Best of Crown of Creation 1985–2015, a double CD with songs from the original albums, unreleased tracks, special mixes and live recordings.

In 2024, the CD maxi Everlasting Love was released.

== Band members ==
- Matthias "Matze" Blazek (synthesizer)
- Thomas Czacharowski (synthesizer)

== Former members ==
- Michaela Rutsch (voice – 1986)
- Bobby / Anja Wieneke (voice – until 1987)
- Sabine Mertens (voice 1987–1988 and 1990)
- Mustafa "Mussi" Akkuzu (guitar 1987–1988)
- Frank Pokrandt (voice 1988)
- Claudia Rohde (voice 1988–1989)
- Andreas Harms (guitar 1988–1989)
- Thomas Richter (bass 1988–1989)
- Dirk Schmalz (guitar 1989)
- Angela Thies (voice 1990)
- Martin Zwiener (synthesizer 1992)
- Nicole Sukar (voice 1992–1994)
- Nicole Knauer (voice 1993–1998)
- Olaf "Oppi" Oppermann (guitar 1994–2010)
- Anne Crönert (voice 2009–2013)
- Adrian Lesch (synthesizer 1994–2015)

== Discography ==
- 1994: Real Life (ContraPunkt)
- 1998: Crown of Creation meets Friends (self published)
- 2001: Paulinchen (with Memory)
- 2003: Berenstark 10 (with When Time is lost)
- 2004: Berenstark 11 (with Friends)
- 2010: Abstürzende Brieftauben – TANZEN (with When Time is lost)
- 2010: CD EP Darkness in your Life
- 2011: W.I.R. präsentiert: Celle's Greatest (with Regrets)
- 2012: Celle's Integrationsprojekt präsentiert: Made in Ce (with Run away and the unpublished Vampires in the Moonlight), sampler dedicated to the Children’s hospice in the Landkreis Celle
- 2013: CD maxi With the Rhythm in my Mind
- 2015: Best of Crown of Creation – 30 Jahre Bandgeschichte 1985–2015
- 2019: CD maxi Tebe pojem
- 2024: CD maxi Everlasting Love
- 2025: World In Chaos (deineScheibe)

== Bibliography ==
- Matthias Blazek (2006). Das niedersächsische Bandkompendium 1963–2003 – Daten und Fakten von 100 Rockgruppen aus Niedersachsen. Celle. pp. 46–47. ISBN 978-3-00-018947-0.
- 25 Jahre Crown of Creation 1985–2010. Musikszene Hannover – Ein Bilderreigen. Adelheidsdorf 2010
- Matthias Blazek; Wolfgang Evers (1997). Dörfer im Schatten der Müggenburg. Celle: self published. pp. 563–564.
