= Celebrate the Nun =

German synth-pop band

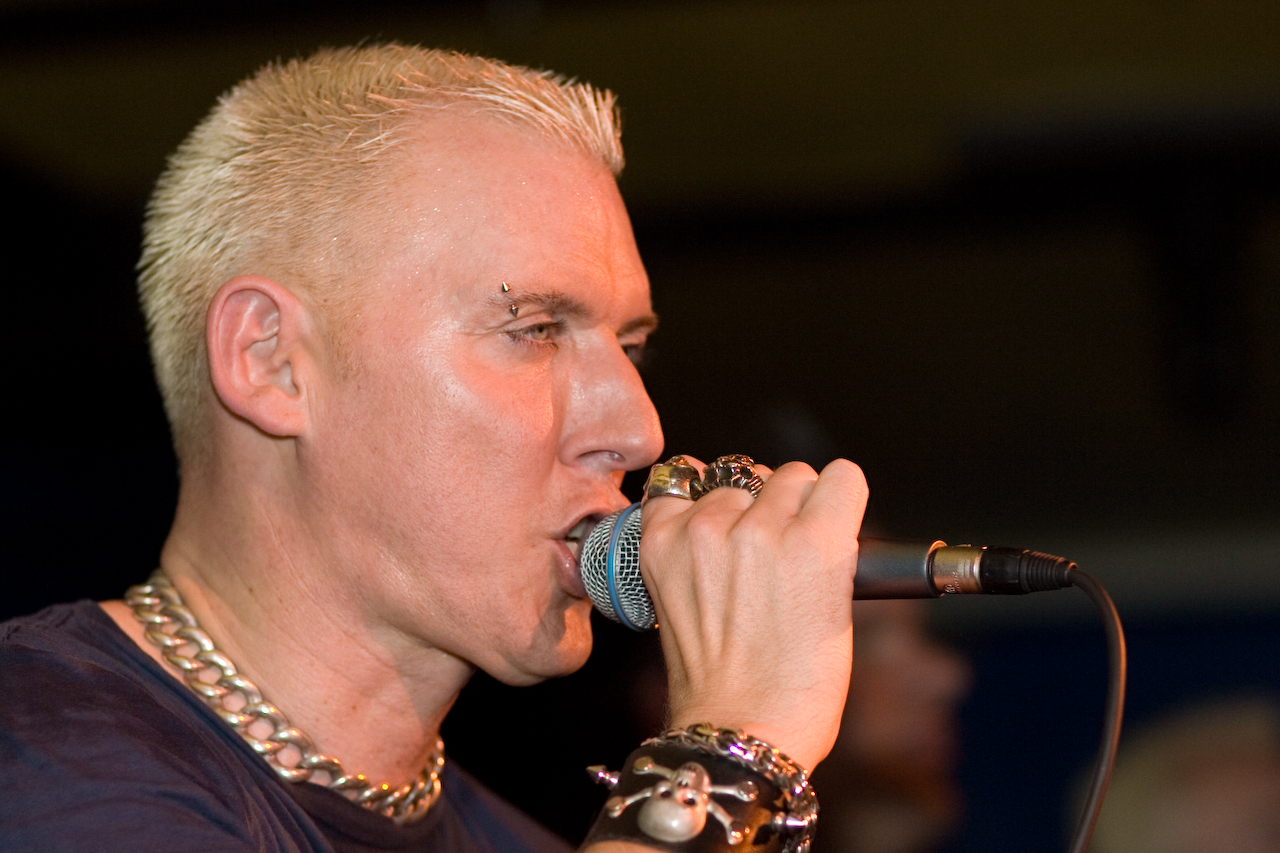
- H. P. Baxxter

Background information
- Origin: Hanover, West Germany
- Genre: Synth-pop
- Years active: 1986–1992
- Labels: Westside Music; EMI Electrola; Metronome; Enigma Records; C47 Digital; A45 Music; Twenty Ten Music
- Spinoffs: Scooter
- Members: H.P. Baxxter; Rick J. Jordan; Britt Maxime; Slin Tompson

Celebrate the Nun was a German synth-pop band founded by H.P. Baxxter, Rick J. Jordan, Britt Maxime (sister of H.P.) and Slin Tompson (Nils Enghusen, formerly with The P.O.X.) in 1986; members of the band would eventually form Scooter.

== Biography ==
The band released its first album Meanwhile in 1989. Their debut single "Ordinary Town" became a minor hit. However, their second single "Will You Be There" reached number five on the Billboard Dance Play chart on 23 June 1990. Their third single "She's a Secretary" peaked at number twelve on 8 December on the same chart. Slin Tompson left the band in 1990 to start a solo project. In 1991, the band released its second album Continuous, but this was less successful due to a decline in the popularity of synthpop. Because of this, the group disbanded in 1992. Soon afterwards, H.P. Baxxter and Rick J. Jordan teamed up with Baxxter's cousin Ferris Bueller to form Scooter. They had asked Britt to join the band as female vocalist, but she declined due to wanting to take a break from music; this position would fall to Rick's wife Nikki instead. Scooter had originally been envisioned as a short-term project but when their second single "Hyper Hyper" became a hit, it was decided that they would be a full-time band.

== Legacy ==
In 1998, Slin Tompson "reformed" the group as Celebrate the None with Phoen X and Skye Burns. He also teaches drums at the music school Fit in Music in Garbsen.

Out of print for years, Celebrate the Nun's entire discography was made available on iTunes in 2009. This includes all remixes that had previously appeared on singles. In addition, Slin Tompson made two of his private recordings available on his website, these being the band's early demo tape, and a live show from 1987.

Baxxter and Jordan have occasionally been asked about their new wave past in interviews. Baxxter in particular remembers this period fondly, but acknowledges that the band needed to pursue more modern dance music in order to remain relevant. Scooter have occasionally done songs in a similar style to Celebrate the Nun, an example being their cover of the Chameleons' "Second Skin", from their album Under the Radar Over the Top. The "Dark Side" bonus disc that appears with the limited edition of that album was also acknowledged as a reference to this period.

== Members ==
- H.P. Baxxter – lead vocals, guitar (1986–1992)
- Rick J. Jordan – keyboards (1986–1992)
- Britt Maxime – vocals, electronic drum, keyboards (1986–1992)
- Slin Tompson – drums, percussion, keyboards (1986–1990)

== Discography ==
=== Albums ===
- Meanwhile (1989)
- Continuous (1991)

=== Singles ===
- "Ordinary Town" (1988)
- "Will You Be There" (1989)
- "She's a Secretary" (1990)
- "Patience" (1991)
- "You Make Me Wonder" (1991)

=== Official bootlegs ===
- Live 1987 @ Hanover Capitol
- Unreleased Songs & Side Projects (the band's demo tape and other tracks)

== Bibliography ==
- Matthias Blazek: Das niedersächsische Bandkompendium 1963–2003 – Daten und Fakten von 100 Rockgruppen aus Niedersachsen. Celle 2006, pp. 34–35 ISBN 978-3-00-018947-0
