= Every Generation Got Its Own Disease =

Single by Fury in the Slaughterhouse

from the album Mono
- Released: 1993
- Recorded: 1992
- Genre: Post-grunge
- Length: 5:28 (album version); 3:59 (radio edit)
- Label: RCA, BMG, SPV
- Composer: Gero Drnek
- Lyricist: Kai-Uwe Wingenfelder
- Producer: Jens Krause

Fury in the Slaughterhouse singles chronology
"Radio Orchid" (1993)	"Every Generation Got Its Own Disease" (1993)	"Dead and Gone" (1994)

"Every Generation Got Its Own Disease" (also simply known as "Every Generation") is a song by German rock band Fury in the Slaughterhouse. The song was released as the second single from the album Mono.

== Reception ==
AllMusic reviewer Tom Demalon called the song "a dark, brooding cut with a hypnotic guitar line" and noted the bleak nature of the lyrics. Demalon said Kai Wingenfelder lacked much range, but called the song the band's best melody.

"Every Generation" is Fury in the Slaughterhouse's most popular and successful single. The song was a commercial success in the band's home country of Germany, peaking at a career high #44 on the Top 100 Singles chart. "Every Generation" was also a success on American rock radio, peaking at #13 and #21 on the Modern Rock and Mainstream Rock charts, respectively.

== Track listing ==
CD maxi single

No.	Title	Length
1.	"Every Generation Got Its Own Disease" (Radio Edit)	3:59
2.	"Girl Without a Name" (Demo Version)	3:29
3.	"Pussycat" (Unplugged)	2:35
4.	"In Your Room" (Unplugged)	2:36
5.	"You'll Never Be Alone" (The AnsweringMachine Demo Version)	4:50

Promo single

No.	Title	Length
1.	"Every Generation Got Its Own Disease" (Edit)	4:34
2.	"Every Generation Got Its Own Disease" (Album Version)	5:28

12" single

Side A
No.	Title	Length
1.	"Every Generation Got Its Own Disease" (Mystified Mix)	4:43

Side B
No.	Title	Length
1.	"Every Generation Got Its Own Disease" (Album Version)	5:28

== Chart positions ==
Chart (1993)	Position
GER	44
US Modern Rock	13
US Mainstream Rock	21

== Personnel ==
- Kai-Uwe Wingenfelder – vocals
- Thorsten Wingenfelder – guitar
- Christof Stein – guitar
- Hannes Schäfer – bass
- Rainer Schumann – drums
