= The P.O.X. =

German psychobilly band

P.O.X.
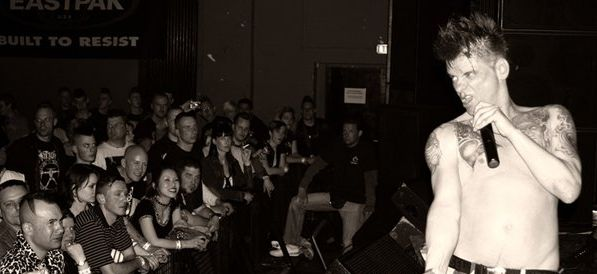
- The POX at the Psychomania Festival Potsdam

Background information
- Origin: Hanover, Lower Saxony, Germany
- Genre: Psychobilly
- Years active: 1982–present
- Website: http://www.the-pox.com/

The P.O.X. is a German psychobilly band formed in 1982. P.O.X. stands for “Psychobilly Orchestra X”.

== Band history ==
The P.O.X. was founded 1982 in Hanover (Germany) by the singer and guitarist Beaker Pox (Mathias Böker) and the drummer Slin Pox (Nils Enghusen). It belongs to the first wave of psychobilly bands, and is the first band of the genre in Germany. In 1983 the guitarist and songwriter Carl Pox (Karl-Heinz "Kalle" Schmidt) completed the final band formation, and in 1984 the band struck a record deal with Wahnsinn Records (Hamburg), releasing the mini LP It's So Dark. International concerts followed, and their next album Voodoo Power was released on the Dutch label KIX4U.

In November 1986, the group disbanded after a European tour. In the following years, the P.O.X. still played at various international psychobilly festivals with the line up Beaker Pox, Carl Pox and Jake Pox, but in 1991 the band finally stopped playing live. In 2008, Beaker and Carl Pox revived the band to celebrate a comeback at the Psychomania Rumble Festival in Potsdam.

After P.O.X., Nils Enghusen became a member of Celebrate the Nun (as Slin Thompson). He also leads the music school "Fit in Music" in Garbsen.
