= Saucepan =

Flat-bottomed pan with a long handle in cookware

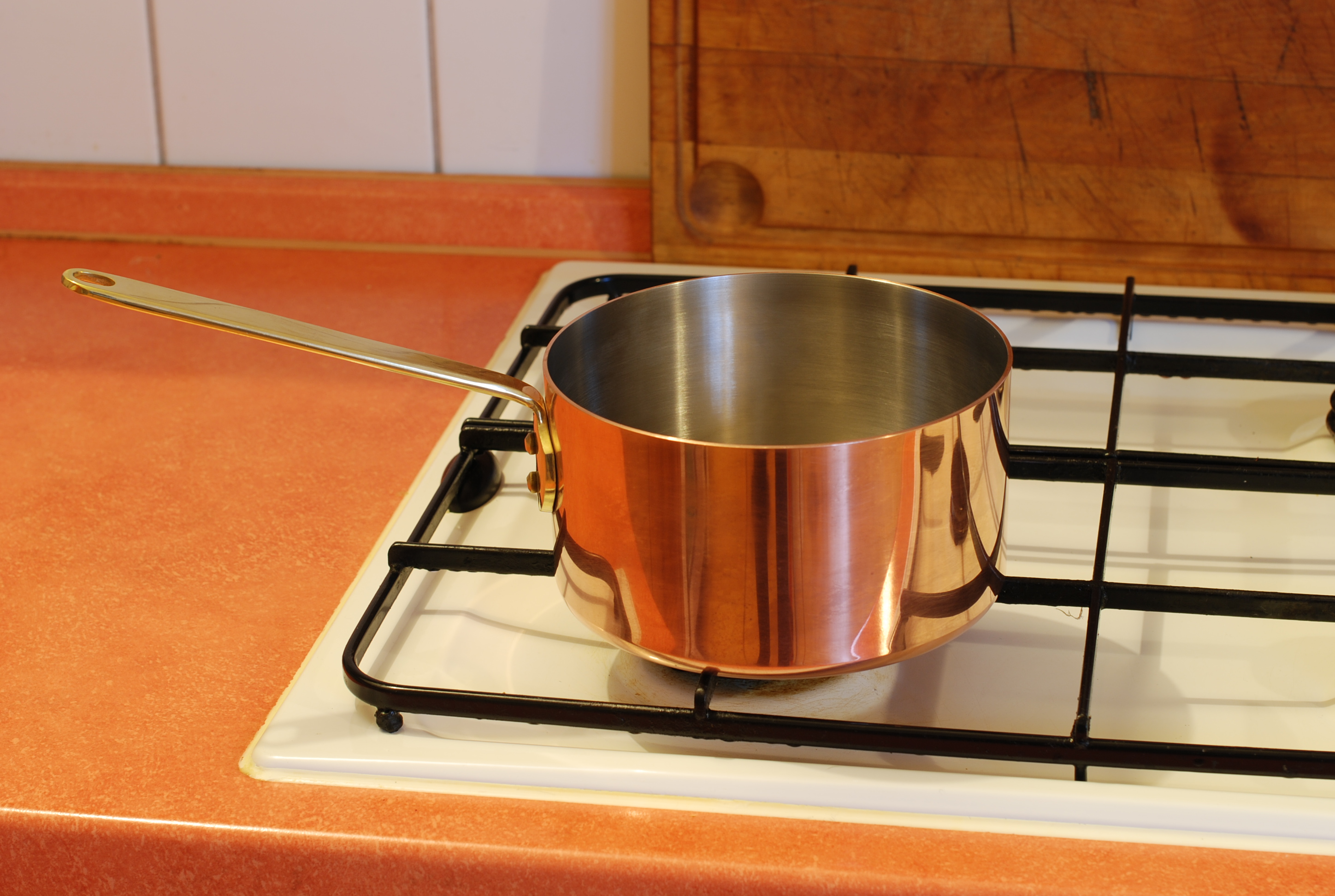
Copper saucepan without lid

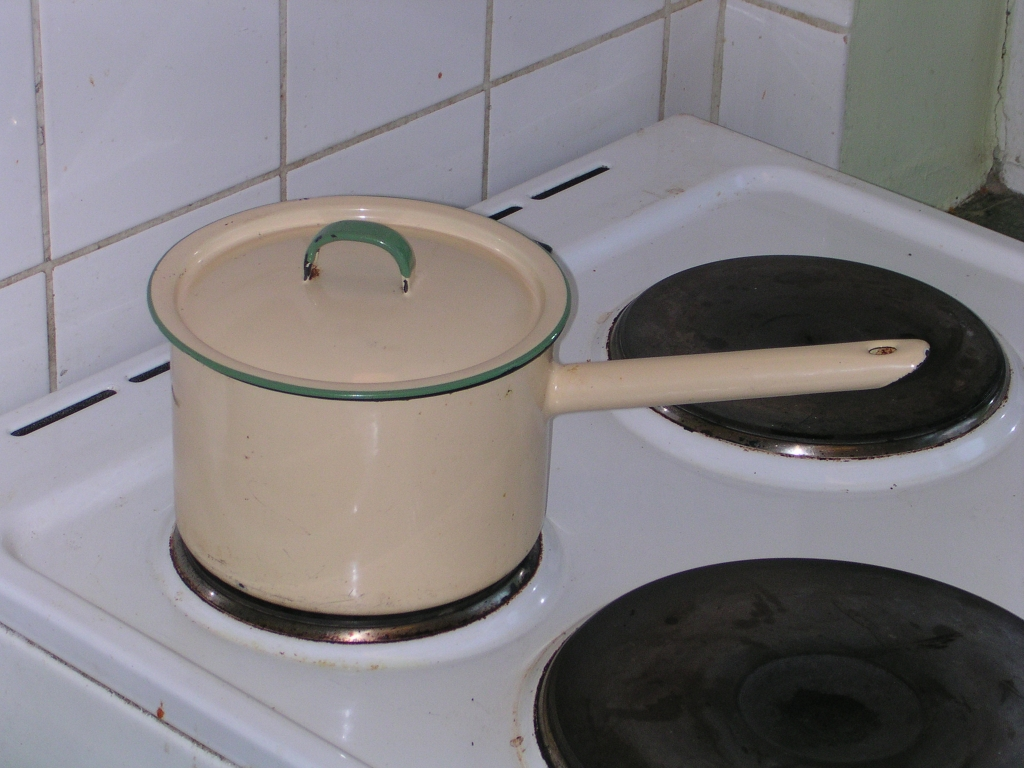
Saucepan with a lid

A saucepan is one of the basic forms of cookware (not technically a pan), in the form of a round cooking vessel, typically 3.5 to 4 inches (90 to 100 mm) deep, and wide enough to hold at least 1 US quart (33 imp fl oz; 950 ml) of water, with sizes typically ranging up to 4 US quarts (130 imp fl oz; 3.8 L), and having a long handle protruding from the vessel. The saucepan can be differentiated from the saucepot by the fact that "a saucepan is a cooking utensil with one handle; a saucepot is equipped with two side handles". Unlike cooking pans, a saucepan is usually not engineered to have non-stick surface. This is so that it can be used in deglazing, a process by which food stuck to the surface of the pan from cooking is recooked with liquid and other ingredients to form a sauce.

== History ==
A predecessor of the saucepan, preceding the wider use of metal cookware in the late Middle Ages, was the pipkin, an earthenware cooking pot used for cooking over direct heat from coals or a wood fire. They were not held in direct flame which would crack the ceramic. It has a handle and many (though not all) examples had three feet. Late medieval and post-medieval pipkins had a hollow handle into which a stick might be inserted for manipulation. Examples exist unglazed, fully glazed, and glazed only on the interior. While often spheroidal, they were made with straight outwardly-sloping sides. In early modern Europe, saucepans "had small iron trivets, or stands, so that they could be pushed into the hot ashes" for cooking.

== Terminology ==
In French, the saucepan is called a "casserole", which may lead to confusion. As one cookbook explains:

Casserole: Although this word has come to mean, in English, an earthenware or other oven dish in which foods are 'casseroled,' in France a casserole is simply what we call a saucepan, with high straight sides and a handle. Technically, this kind of saucepan is called a 'casserole russe'; a shallow saucepan with straight sides is a sautoir, a sauteuse, a casserole á sauter, a casserole-sauteuse, or a plat á sauter.

In some households, saucepans are called "pots", in contrast with wider forms of pans, although this confuses them with the traditional cooking pot. Historically, a pot can be broadly defined as "any closed vessel manufactured for use in the cooking process", but in modern usage, a pot may typically be contrasted to a frying pan, compared to which a pot "is a deep vessel with a relatively heavy bottom and a lid.
