= Bron Elektronik =

Flash equipment company

Bron Elektronik AG
- Industry: Digital Imaging
- Founded: Allschwil, Switzerland (1958)
- Headquarters: Allschwil, Switzerland
- Area served: Worldwide
- Products: Flash, Continuous lighting, monolight, Flash (photography), Reflectance Transformation Imaging, LED lamp, Softbox, Reflector (photography)
- Brands: broncolor, kobold, visatec
- Website: https://www.broncolor.swiss/

Bron Elektronik is a manufacturer of flash equipment for photography and videography. It is located in Allschwil in Switzerland. Bron manufactures the broncolor lines of strobes, which include studio lighting systems with separate power packs and heads, as well as monolights. Both lines include light modifiers. The Focal Encyclopedia of Photography describes broncolor as "the leading Swiss manufacturer" of generator flash systems.

The flagship of the broncolor line is the Scoro S 3200. Columnist Dan Havlik subjected this power-pack system to an in-depth review in Photo District News. The Scoro Line garnered the 2009 Technical Image Press Association (TIPA) award for Best Studio Generator.

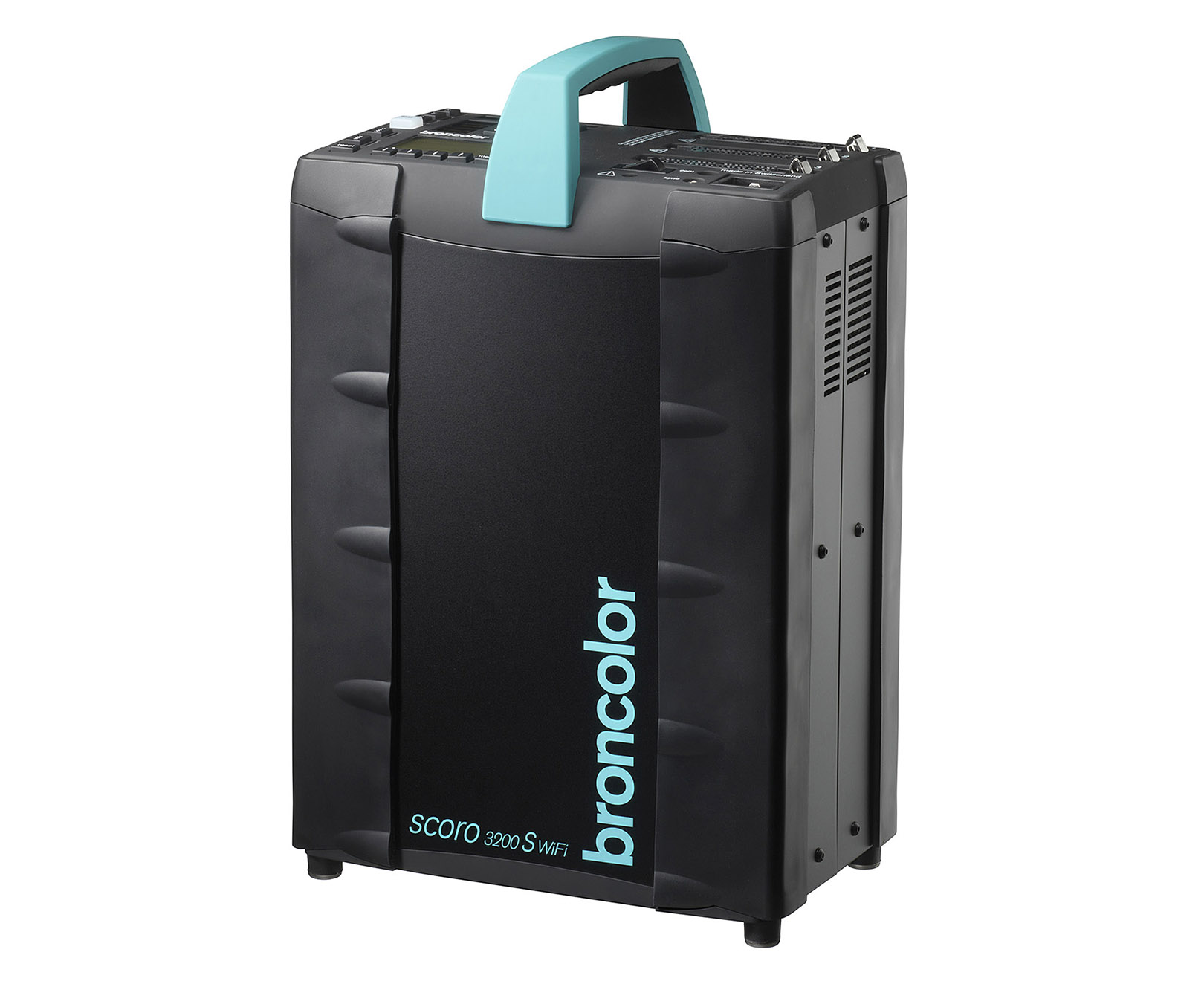
Broncolor Scoro 3200S wifi- photography lighting powerpack

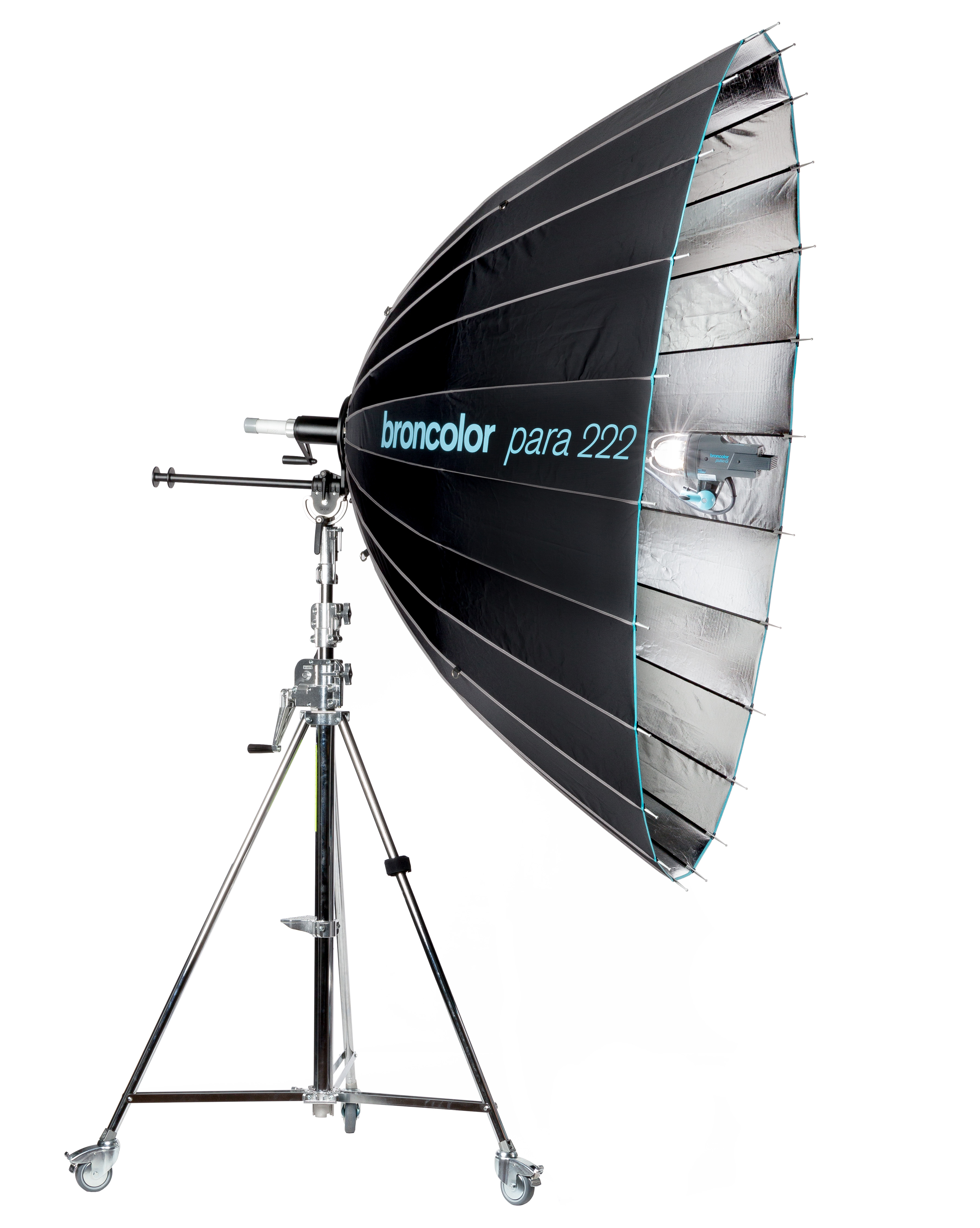
Broncolor Para 222 Reflector

broncolor's Para line of parabolic light reflectors have become a leading item for the company. Compatible with flash, and HMI lamps, the Paras range from 88CM to 330CM.

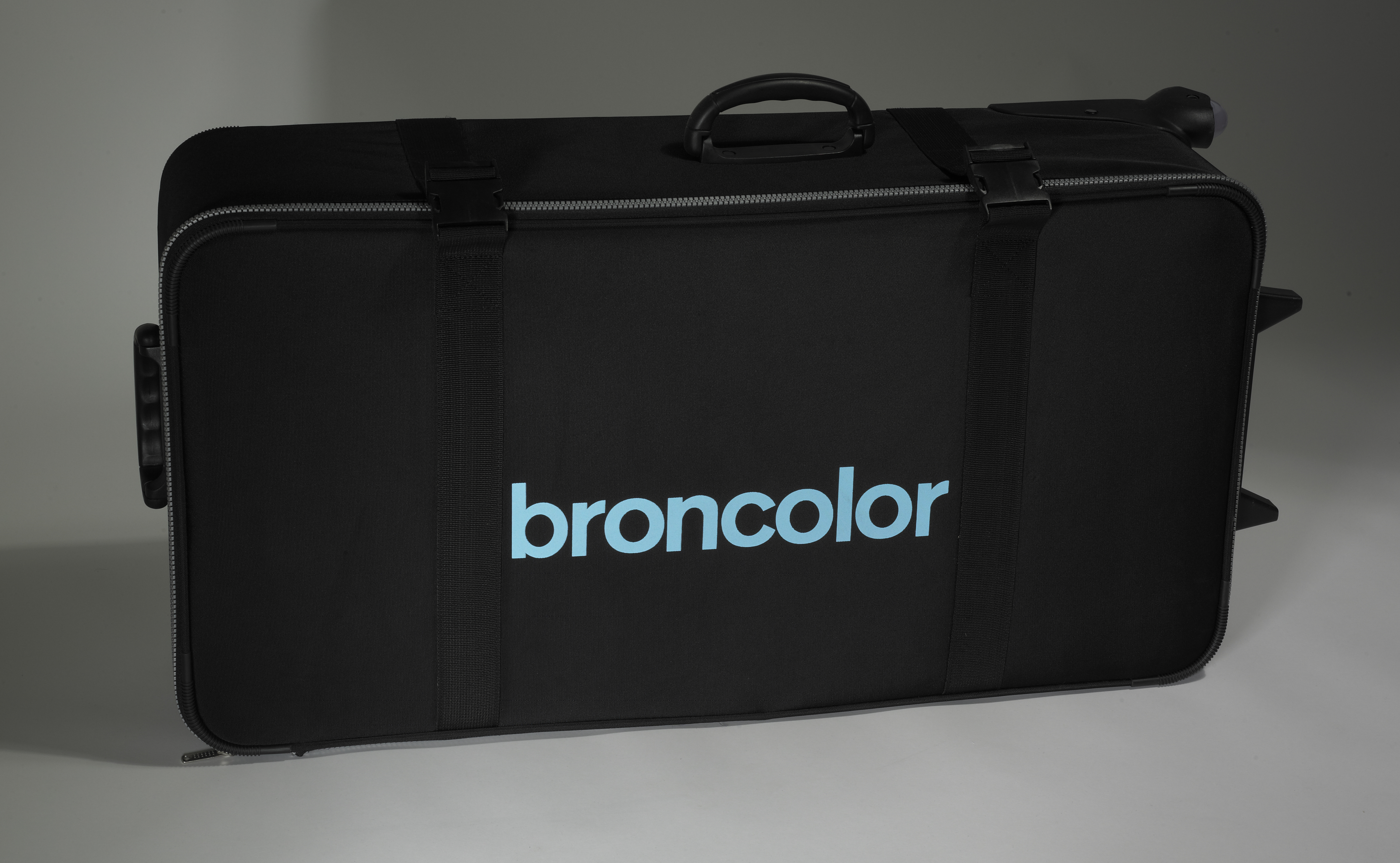
Broncolor trolley case

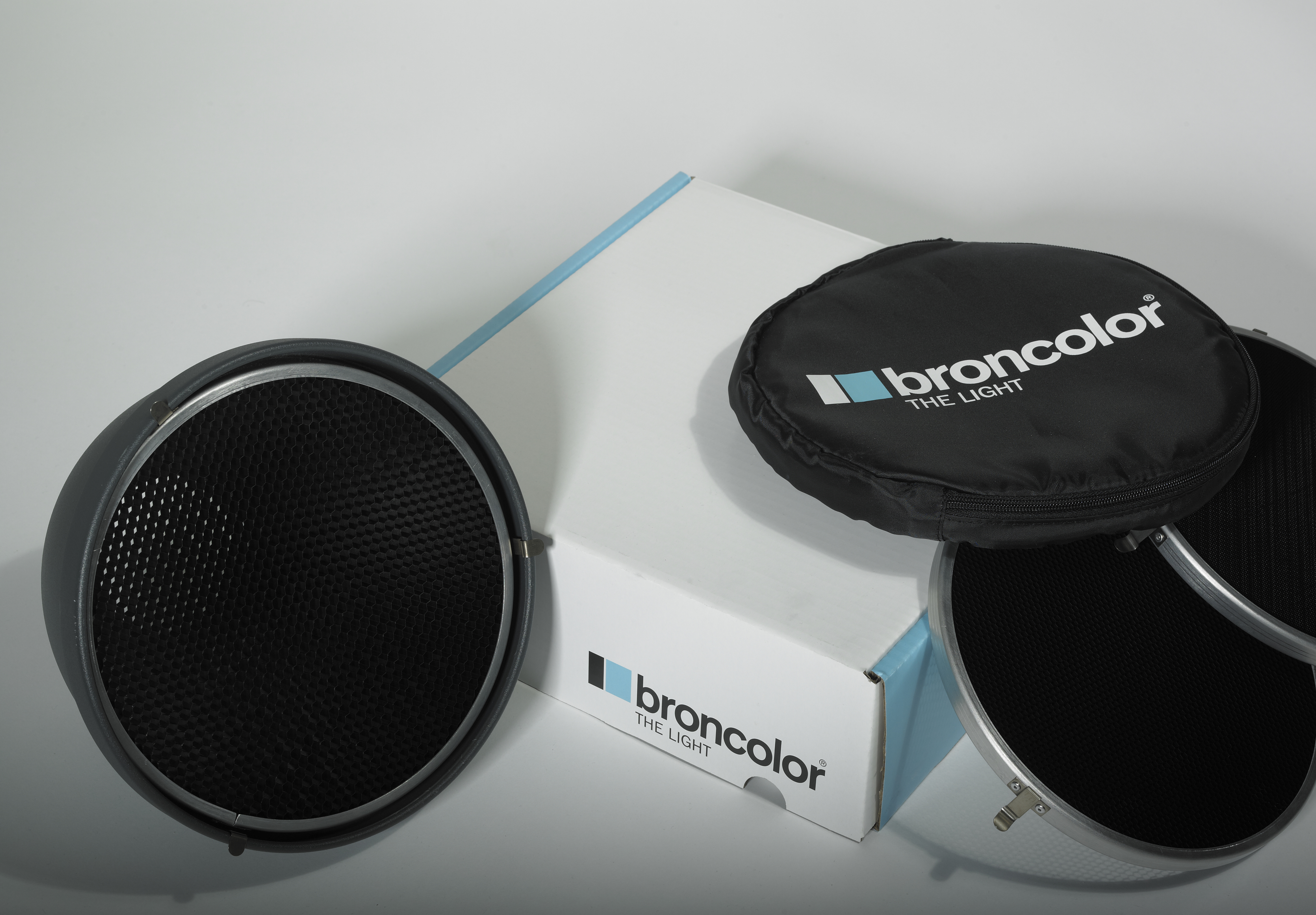
Broncolor honey combs

== Flash Units ==
=== Studio Packs ===
==== High End ====
Pulso

- Pulso 8 (1985 ~ 1999)
- Pulso 4 & A4 (1984 ~ 1997)
- Pulso 2 & A2 (1984 ~ 1995)

Grafit

- Grafit A4 (1996 ~ ?)
- Grafit A2 (1996 ~ ?)
- Grafit 4 (1998 ~ 2000)
- Grafit 2 (1998 ~ 2000)

Scoro

- Scoro 3200S (2012 ~ Today)
- Scoro 1600S (2012 ~ Today)
- Scoro 3200E (2012 ~ Today)
- Scoro 1600E (2012 ~ Today)
- Scoro A4 & A4S (2009 ~ 2012)
- Scoro A2 & A2S (2009 ~ 2012)

==== Low End ====
Opus

- Opus 8 & A8 (1991 ~ 1997)
- Opus 4 & Opus A4 (1990 ~ 1998)
- Opus 2 & Opus A2 (1990 ~ 1998)

Primo

- Primo 4 (1994 ~ 2002)
- Primo 2 (1992 ~ 2002)

Topas

- Topas A8 (2000 ~ ?)
- Topas A4 (2000 ~ ?)
- Topas A2 (2000 ~ ?)

Nano

- Nano A4 (2001 ~ ?)
- Nano A2 (2001 ~ ?)

Veroso

- Verso A4 (2006 ~ ?)
- Verso A2 (2006 ~ ?)

Senso

- Senso A4 (2010 ~ Today)
- Senso A2 (2010 ~ Today)

==== Oldest Powered Packs ====
BC1

- BC1 (1958 ~ 1961)

S51/S101

- S101 (1959 ~ 1969)
- S51 (1959 ~ 1969)

S6/S12

- S12 (1963 ~ 1965)
- S6 (1962 ~ 1965)

600N/1200N

- 1200N (1966 ~ 1967)
- 600N (1966 ~ 1967)

700R/1400R

- 1400R (1968 ~ 1978)
- 700R (1968 ~ 1978)

200

- 200 (1972 ~ 1977)

260

- 260 (1974 ~ 1980)

606

- 606 (1976 ~ 1984)

404

- 404 (1978 ~ 1984)

304

- 304 (1980 ~ 1984)

FlashMan

- FlashMan (1984 ~ 1992)

=== Battery Powered Packs ===
Mobil

- Mobil (1998 ~ ?)

Mobil A2R/A2L

- Mobil A2L (2011 ~ ?)
- MoBil A2R (2008 ~ ?)

Verso

- Verso A4 (2006 ~ ?)
- Verso A2 (2006 ~ ?)

Move

- Move 1200J (2012 ~ Today)

=== Monolights ===
Impact

- Impact S80 (1991 ~ 1995)
- Impact 41 (1982 ~ 1992)
- Impact 21 (1982 ~ 1992)

Complus

- Complus (1986 ~ 1996)

Minipuls

- Miniplus C200 (1994 ~ ?)
- Miniplus D160 (1998 ~ 2006)
- Miniplus C80 (1994 ~ 2003)
- Miniplus C40 (1994 ~ 2003)

Minicom

- Minicom 160 (2010 ~ ?)
- Minicom 80 (2003 ~ ?)
- Minicom 40 (2003 ~ ?)

Siros S

- Siros 800 & 800S (2014 ~ Today)
- Siros 400 & 400S (2014 ~ Today)

=== Battery Powered Monolights ===
Siros L

- Siros 800L (2016 ~ Today)
- Siros 400L (2016 ~ Today)

=== Oldest Monolights ===
C171

- C171 (1975 ~ 1986)

C70

- C70 (1976 ~ 1983)

== Heads ==
=== High End ===
Pulso

Pulso F

Pulso G

=== Low End ===
Primo

Unilite

Picolite

Litos

=== Mobile ===
Mobilite

Mobilite 2

Mobiled

=== Special Application ===
Boxlite 40

Litestick

Pulso-Spot 4

Ringflash P

Ringflash C

Striplite 60 Evolution

Striplite 120 Evolution

Lightbar 60 Evolution

Lightbar 120 Evolution

== Light Shapers ==
Hard Modifiers

- STANDARD REFLECTOR

* P70 Reflector 
* P65 Reflector
* L40 Reflector (For Siros)

- NARROW ANGLE REFLECTOR

* P-Travel Reflector 
* P50 Reflector
* P45 Reflector

- WIDE ANGLE REFLECTOR

* Wide Angle Reflectors P120

- Beauty Reflector

* Beauty Dish Reflector 
* Softlight Reflector P-Soft

- Ringflash Reflector

* Power Reflector For Ringflash C
* Soft Reflector For Ringflash C 
* Beauty Reflector For Ringflash C

- ETC Reflector

* PAR Reflector 
* Background Reflector

Optical Modifiers

- Fresnel

* Flooter 
* Spot Attachment 
* Projection Attachment For Picolite
* Fresnel Spot Attachment For Picolite
* Optical Snoot 150mm (Pulso-Spot4)

ETC Modifiers

- Snoot

* Conical Snoot 
* 3-HoneyComb Grids And 2-Aperture Masks For Picolite

- ETC Tools

* LitePipe P 
* Ballon 
* UV Attachment

- GRID

* Strip Grid 5:1 (P70)
* Honeycomb grid extremely narrow(P70)
* Honeycomb grid extremely     narrow(P65&P45)
* HoneyComb Grid (SoftLight Reflector P & Beauty Dish)
* HoneyComb Grid (Striplite 60)
* HoneyComb Set (P70)
* HoneyComb Set (P50)
* HoneyComb Set (L40)
* HoneyComb Set (RingFlash C)
* HoneyComb Set (Power Reflector)

- BARN DOORS

* Barn Doors 4-Wings (P70)
* Barn Doors 4-Wings (P65 & P45 & PAR)
* Barn Doors 4-Wings (L40)
* Barn Door with 4-wings for Mobilite 2 & Picolite
* Barn Doors 2-Wings (P70)
* Barn Doors (LiteBar & StripLite 60)

SoftBoxes

- OCTA SoftBox

* SoftBox 75 cm (2.5’)
* SoftBox 150 cm (4.9’)

- SQUARE SoftBox

* SoftBox 60x60cm (2 x 2’)
* SoftBox 100x100cm (3.3 x 3.3’)

- RECTANGULAR SoftBox

* SoftBox 35x60cm (1.1 x 2’)
* SoftBox 60x100cm (2 x 3.3’)
* SoftBox 90x120cm (3 x 3.9’)
* SoftBox 120x180cm (3.9 x 5.8)

- STRIP SoftBox

* SoftBox 30x120cm (1 x 3.9’)
* SoftBox 30x180cm (1 x 5.9’)

- EDGE MASK

* Edge Mask 35x60cm
* Edge Mask 60x100cm 
* Edge Mask 90x120cm
* Edge Mask 120x180cm

- STRIP MASK

* Strip Mask 7.5 cm For 30x120cm 
* Strop Mask 10 cm For 30x180cm

- GRID <OCTA & BEAUTYBOX>

* Grid 40° For OCTABOX 75 cm
* Grid 40° For OCTABOX 150 cm
* Grid 40° For BeautyBox 65 cm

<RECTANGULAR>

* Grid 40° For 35x60cm
* Grid 40° For 60x100cm
* Grid 40° For 90x120cm
* Grid 40° For 120x180cm

<SQUARE>

* Grid 40° For 60x60cm
* Grid 40° For 100x100cm

<STRIP>

* Grid 40° For 30x120cm
* Grid 40° For 30x180cm

Umbrellas

- Shallow Umbrella Silver Type

* Umbrella Silver 85 cm (33.5’)
* Umbrella Silver 105 cm (41.3’)

- Shallow Umbrella White Type

* Umbrella White 85 cm (33.5’)
* Umbrella White 105 cm (41.3’)

- Shallow Umbrella Transparent Type

* Umbrella Transparent 85 cm (33.5’)
* Umbrella Transparent 105 cm (41.3’)

- Parabolic Umbrella

*  Focus 110 cm (silver Type)

Parabolic

- Para 330FF > Para 330FB

- Para 220 > Para 220FF > Para 220FB > Para 222

- Para 170FF > Para 170FB > Para 177

- Para 133 > Para 133HR

- Para 88 > Para 88HR

- PARA DIFFUSER

<Para 88>

* Para 88 Diffuser1(minimal Diffusion)
* Para 88 Diffuser2(medium Diffusion) 
* Para 88 Diffuser3(maximum Diffusion)

<Para 133>

* Para 133 Diffuser1(minimal Diffusion)
* Para 133 Diffuser2(medium Diffusion) 
* Para 133 Diffuser3(maximum Diffusion)

<Para 177>

* Para 177 Diffuser1(minimal Diffusion)
* Para 177 Diffuser2(medium Diffusion) 
* Para 177 Diffuser3(maximum Diffusion)

<Para 222>

* Para 222 Diffuser1(minimal Diffusion)
* Para 222 Diffuser2(medium Diffusion) 
* Para 222 Diffuser3(maximum Diffusion)

== LED ==
LED F160

== Scope D50, the Surface Visualizer ==
In 2018, broncolor presented the Scope D50, a surface visualizer developed in cooperation with the software company Truvis. Its main applications are cultural heritage imaging and reproduction. The same year, it got elected one of the innovative photography gear of 2018 by PDN.
