= Nienhagen, Lower Saxony =

Nienhagen
- Municipality
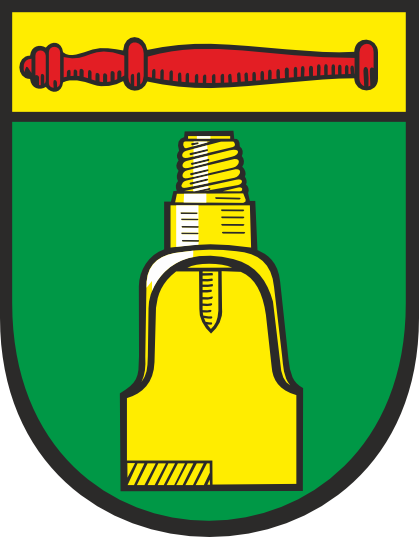
- Coat of arms

- Location of Nienhagen within Celle district
- Interactive map of Nienhagen
- Location within Germany Location within Lower Saxony
- Coordinates: 52°33′N 10°6′E
- Country: Germany
- State: Lower Saxony
- District: Celle
- Municipal assoc.: Wathlingen
- Subdivisions: 3 Ortsteile

Government
  - Mayor: Jörg Makel (SPD)

Area
  - Total: 17.6 km^{2} (6.8 sq mi)
- Elevation: 41 m (135 ft)

Population (2025-12-31)
  - Total: 6,393
  - Density: 363/km^{2} (941/sq mi)
- Time zone: UTC+01:00 (CET)
  - Summer (DST): UTC+02:00 (CEST)
- Postal codes: 29336
- Dialling codes: 05144
- Vehicle registration: CE
- Website: www.nienhagen.de

Nienhagen (German pronunciation: [niːnˈhaːɡn̩]) is a municipality in the district of Celle, in Lower Saxony, Germany.
