= Will You Be There (Celebrate the Nun song) =

Single by Celebrate the Nun

from the album Meanwhile
- Released: 1989
- Genre: Synth-pop
- Length: 3:34 (7"); 5:30 (12")
- Label: Parlophone Records, EMI Electrola
- Songwriters: H. P. Baxxter, Rick J. Jordan, Britt Maxime, Slin Tompson
- Producers: Achim Völker, Peter Siedlaczek

Celebrate the Nun singles chronology
"Ordinary Town" (1988)	"Will You Be There" (1989)	"She's a Secretary" (1990)

"Will You Be There" is a song by German synth-pop band Celebrate the Nun. It was released as a single in 1989, and is from their 1990 debut album Meanwhile. The song is the group's biggest hit, peaking at No. 5 on the Billboard Dance Play chart on the week of June 23, 1990.

== CD production ==
The title was recorded and mixed in different versions in the summer of 1989 by Achim Völker (executive producer) and Peter Siedlaczek (chief sound engineer) on behalf of the record label Westside Music, in the ArtLab studios in Frankfurt am Main. Even before the release of the album Meanwhile (1990), the maxi-CD was released in the fall of 1989 in several versions and formats (mini-CD). The materials used for the CD cover photos were taken by Michael W. Frank, with the design of Jürgen Höber.

== Music video ==
Like the video for "Ordinary Town", the music video for this song is a simple performance by the band in a multi-coloured room.

== Track listings ==
7" single (UK, 1989)

1. "Will You Be There" – 3:30
2. "Unattainable Love" – 3:32

12" single (US, 1989)

1. "Will You Be There" (Celebrate the Nun Mix) – 7:27
2. "Will You Be There" (Devilish Dub) – 4:59
3. "Will You Be There" (7" Mix) – 3:34
4. "Will You Be There" (A cappella) – 0:35
5. "Will You Be There" (French Floor Mix) – 6:07
6. "Will You Be There" (French Floor Dub) – 3:39
7. "Will You Be There" (12" Version) – 5:30

12" single (Germany, 1989)

1. "Will You Be There" – 5:30
2. "Unattainable Love" – 4:36
3. "Will You Be There" (A cappella) – 0:35

In 2002, the song was released again, as the version V.02 and track 2 of the CD maxi "Arthur Have You Eaten All The Ginger-Biscuits" by Celebrate the None. This version was produced and mixed by Carlos Perón (Yello).

== See also ==
- Coloured documentation at ru.wikipedia.org
