= Matthias Blazek =

German local historian and journalist (born 1966)

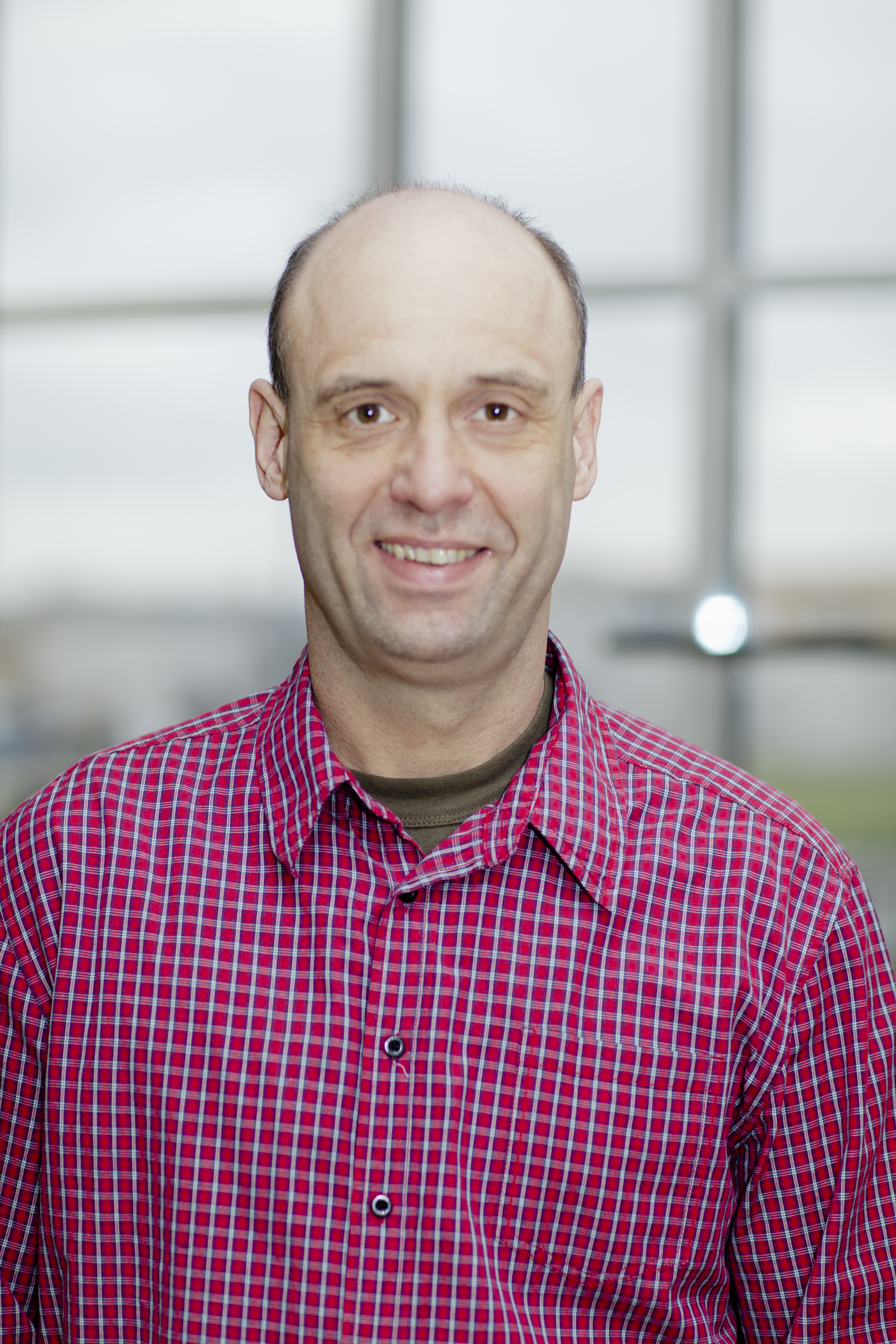
Matthias Blazek

Matthias Blazek (born 1966) is a German local historian and journalist.

== Biography ==
Matthias Blazek was born in Celle and spent his youth in Hanover, where he completed his Abitur at the Lutherschule Hannover in 1987.

From 1987 to 1999 he served as a military signaller in the German Army, including five years at the German military base in Fontainebleau, France, from 1994–1999. From 1999 to 2002 he completed his studies at the College of General Administration in Hildesheim. Today he lives with his family in Adelheidsdorf.

Since 2001 Blazek has voluntarily served as a municipal councillor; initially as a citizen member of the SPD, then as an independent member of the Group of Citizens for Adelheidsdorf. He led the Finance Committee of Wathlingen from 2006 to 2011 and is currently the leader of the group Alliance '90/The Greens Council of Wathlingen.

Since 1997 Matthias Blazek has written numerous local history books and scholarly articles. From 2007 to 2008 he was editor of the Celler Blickpunkt. His articles frequently appear in the Cellesche Zeitung, especially in the special supplement „Sachsenspiegel“ (Saxon Mirror).

== Works (selection) ==
- Dörfer im Schatten der Müggenburg. Celle 1997
- L’Histoire des Sapeurs-Pompiers de Fontainebleau. Fontainebleau 1999
- Die Geschichte der Bezirksregierung Hannover im Spiegel der Verwaltungsreformen. ibidem, Stuttgart 2004, ISBN 3-89821-357-9
- Hexenprozesse – Galgenberge – Hinrichtungen – Kriminaljustiz im Fürstentum Lüneburg und im Königreich Hannover. ibidem, Stuttgart 2006, ISBN 3-89821-587-3
- Das niedersächsische Bandkompendium 1963–2003. Celle 2006, ISBN 978-3-00-018947-0
- Das Löschwesen im Bereich des ehemaligen Fürstentums Lüneburg von den Anfängen bis 1900. Adelheidsdorf 2006, ISBN 978-3-00-019837-3
- Das Kurfürstentum Hannover und die Jahre der Fremdherrschaft 1803–1813. ibidem, Stuttgart 2007, ISBN 3-89821-777-9
- 75 Jahre Niedersächsische Landesfeuerwehrschule Celle 1931–2006. Celle 2007, ISBN 978-3-00-019333-0
- Celle – Neu entdeckt. Schadinsky, Celle 2007, ISBN 978-3-9812133-0-0
- Geschichten und Ereignisse um die Celler Neustadt. Stadt Celle, Celle 2008, ISBN 978-3-00-019698-0
- Die Hinrichtungsstätte des Amtes Meinersen. ibidem, Stuttgart 2008, ISBN 978-3-89821-957-0
- Haarmann und Grans – Der Fall, die Beteiligten und die Presseberichterstattung. ibidem, Stuttgart 2009, ISBN 978-3-89821-967-9
- Carl Großmann und Friedrich Schumann – Zwei Serienmörder in den zwanziger Jahren. ibidem, Stuttgart 2009, ISBN 978-3-8382-0027-9
- Unter dem Hakenkreuz: Die deutschen Feuerwehren 1933–1945. ibidem, Stuttgart 2009, ISBN 978-3-89821-997-6
- Wathlingen – Geschichte eines niedersächsischen Dorfes, Band 3. Wathlingen 2009, ISBN 978-3-00-027770-2
- Scharfrichter in Preußen und im Deutschen Reich 1866–1945. ibidem, Stuttgart 2010, ISBN 978-3-8382-0107-8
- Die Geschichte des Feuerwehrwesens im Landkreis Celle. ibidem, Stuttgart 2010, ISBN 978-3-8382-0147-4
- Im Schatten des Klosters Wienhausen – Dörfliche Entstehung und Entwicklung im Flotwedel, ausgeführt und erläutert am Beispiel der Ortschaften Bockelskamp und Flackenhorst. ibidem, Stuttgart 2010, ISBN 978-3-8382-0157-3
- Die Anfänge des Celler Landgestüts und des Celler Zuchthauses sowie weiterer Einrichtungen im Kurfürstentum und Königreich Hannover 1692–1866. ibidem, Stuttgart 2011, ISBN 978-3-8382-0247-1
- Die Grafschaft Schaumburg 1647–1977. ibidem, Stuttgart 2011, ISBN 978-3-8382-0257-0
- „Herr Staatsanwalt, das Urteil ist vollstreckt.“ Die Brüder Wilhelm und Friedrich Reindel – Scharfrichter im Dienste des Norddeutschen Bundes und Seiner Majestät 1843–1898. ibidem, Stuttgart 2011, ISBN 978-3-8382-0277-8
- „Wie bist du wunderschön!“ Westpreußen – Das Land an der unteren Weichsel. ibidem, Stuttgart 2012, ISBN 978-3-8382-0357-7
- Die Schlacht bei Trautenau – Der einzige Sieg Österreichs im Deutschen Krieg 1866. ibidem, Stuttgart 2012, ISBN 978-3-8382-0367-6
- Die Geschichte des Hamburger Sportvereins von 1887: 125 Jahre im Leben eines der populärsten Fußballvereine. Mit einem besonderen Blick auf die Vorgängervereine, die Frühzeit des Hamburger Ballsports und das Fusionsjahr 1919. ibidem, Stuttgart 2012, ISBN 978-3-8382-0387-4
- Seeräuberei, Mord und Sühne – Eine 700-jährige Geschichte der Todesstrafe in Hamburg 1292–1949. ibidem, Stuttgart 2012, ISBN 978-3-8382-0457-4
- Die geheime Großbaustelle in der Heide – Faßberg und sein Fliegerhorst 1933–2013. ibidem, Stuttgart 2013, ISBN 978-3-95538-017-5
- The Mamas and The Papas – Flower-Power-Ikonen, Psychedelika und sexuelle Revolution. ibidem, Stuttgart 2014, ISBN 978-3-8382-0577-9
- Die Jagd auf den Wolf – Isegrims schweres Schicksal in Deutschland. Beiträge zur Jagdgeschichte des 18. und 19. Jahrhunderts. ibidem, Stuttgart 2014, ISBN 978-3-8382-0647-9
- Großmoor. Adelheidsdorf 2014, ISBN 978-3-00-045759-3
- Memoirs of Carl Wippo – Lebenserinnerungen von Carl Wippo. Beiträge über die Auswanderung nach Nordamerika aus dem Königreich Hannover in den Jahren 1846–1852. ibidem, Stuttgart 2016, ISBN 978-3-8382-1027-8
- Die Geschichte des Eurokorps – 25 Jahre im Leben eines der populärsten Militärbündnisse. Mit einem besonderen Blick auf die Entwicklung der deutsch-französischen Zusammenarbeit. ibidem, Stuttgart 2017, ISBN 978-3-8382-1127-5
- Mord und Sühne – Der Prozess gegen den Schuhmacher Ludwig Hilberg, der 1864 vor großem Publikum hingerichtet wurde. ibidem, Stuttgart 2017, ISBN 978-3-8382-1147-3
- Vulkanismus in den Quellen und Darstellungen des 19. Jahrhunderts. ibidem, Stuttgart 2018, ISBN 978-3-8382-7227-6
- Briefe aus der Jugend in der NS-Zeit. ibidem, Stuttgart 2020, ISBN 978-3-8382-1507-5
- Ein dunkles Kapitel der deutschen Geschichte: Hexenprozesse, Galgenberge, Hinrichtungen, Kriminaljustiz in Hannover vom Mittelalter bis 1866. ibidem, Stuttgart 2020, ISBN 978-3-8382-1517-4
- Polacy w Westfalii – Polen in Westfalen. Polnische Migration ins Ruhrgebiet zur Zeit des Deutschen Kaiserreichs. ibidem, Stuttgart 2021, ISBN 978-3-8382-1597-6

== Bibliography ==
- Oskar Ansull: Himmel, welch ein Land! LANDKREIS & LITERATUR – Eine Sichtung. celler hefte 7–8 (double issue), ed. by the RWLE Möller Stiftung, Celle 2010, ISBN 978-3-9813668-3-9, p. 59 f.
