= Crown of Creation Meets Friends =

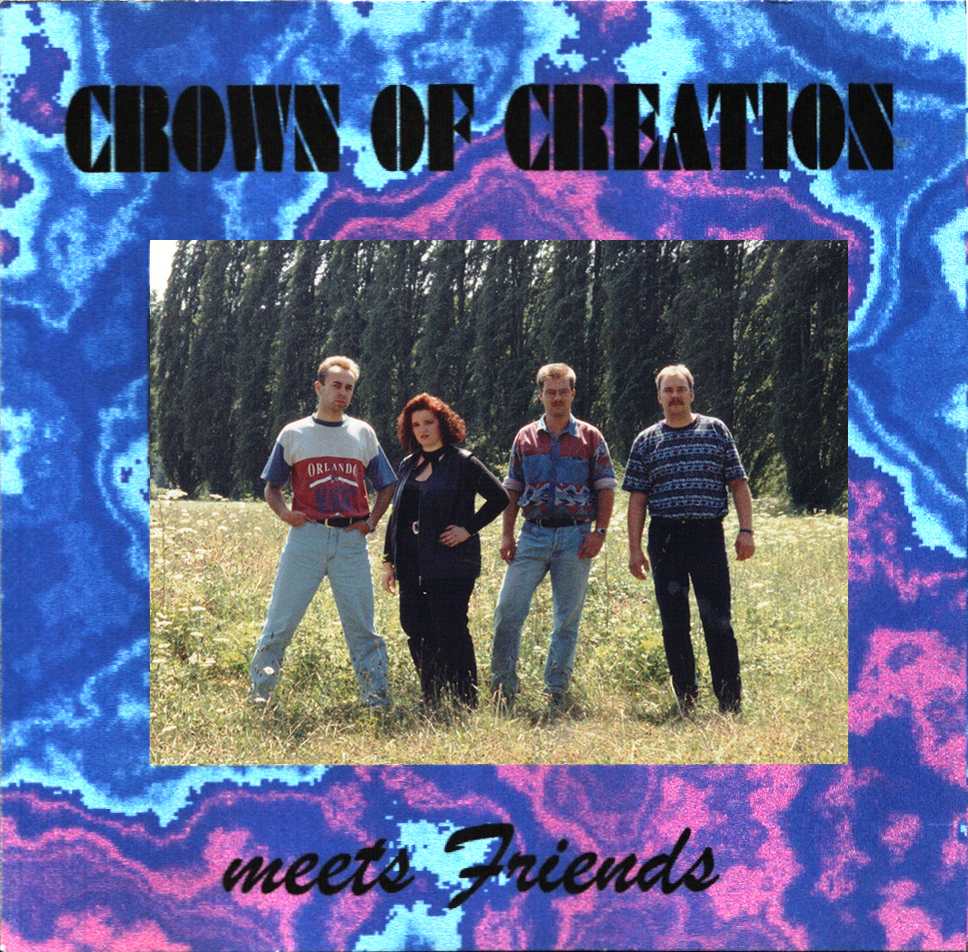

Studio album by Crown of Creation
- Released: January 1998
- Recorded: October 10, 1994 to September 1997
- Genres: Pop, synthpop
- Length: 69:54
- Language: English
- Producers: Matthias Dorn; Philippe Beaucamp

Crown of Creation chronology
Real Life (1994)	Crown of Creation Meets Friends (1998)	Darkness in Your Life (2010)

Crown of Creation Meets Friends is the second album released by West German synthpop/pop group Crown of Creation. It was released in January 1998, and produced by Matthias Dorn and Philippe Beaucamp.

== Track listing ==
- All songs written by Thomas Czacharowski. "Gimme Hope" and "Better and better" are written by Thomas Czacharowski and Nicci Knauer. "Friends" was composed by Adrian Lesch and Thomas Czacharowski. Frank Müller wrote the songs for Frank & Friends.

No.	Title	Length
1.	"Angel"	4:55
2.	"Gimme Hope"	4:41
3.	"When Time is lost"	6:22
4.	"Better and better"	4:25
5.	"Child's Eyes"	5:29
6.	"Friends"	5:03
7.	"Gone with the Wind" (Tears in Motion)	4:13
8.	"You lift me up" (Tears in Motion)	3:48
9.	"Summerdream" (Tears in Motion)	4:14
10.	"Walk the Rainbow" (Trance-4-Matian)	4:41
11.	"This is our Future" (Trance-4-Matian)	4:54
12.	"Take my Hand" (Trance-4-Matian)	4:30
13.	"My Heart and your Heart" (Trance-4-Matian)	4:37
14.	"Cry out" (Frank & Friends)	4:06
15.	"Out in the Dark" (Frank & Friends)	3:52
Total length:		69:54

== Personnel ==
=== Crown of Creation ===
- Nicci Knauer: Vocals
- Thomas Czacharowski: Synthesizer
- Adrian Lesch: Synthesizer
- Olaf Oppermann: Guitar

=== Additional musicians ===
- Jeanette: Backing vocals
- Olaf: Backing Vocals

== Production ==
- Produced by Matthias Dorn (Ibex Studio, Großenheidorn, all tracks except 3) & Philippe Beaucamp (Studio Adam, Roissy-en-Brie, France, track 3)
- Recorded & Engineered by Matthias Dorn
- Technical Assistance: Thomas Czacharowski & Adrian Lesch
- Mixed by Matthias Dorn

== Tracks on samplers ==
- 2003: Berenstark 10 (with When Time is lost)
- 2004: Berenstark 11 (with Friends)
- 2010: Abstürzende Brieftauben – TANZEN (with When Time is lost)
