= Monoblock Industry of Imagineering =

Monoblock
- Industry: Design, publishing
- Founded: 2004
- Founder: Pablo Galuppo and Vik Arrieta
- Headquarters: Buenos Aires, Argentina
- Area served: Worldwide
- Products: Accessories, apparel, homeware, decor
- Website: www.monoblock.tv

Monoblock Industry of Imagineering is a design and publishing firm established in February 2004 by Pablo Galuppo and Vik Arrieta. Currently located in Buenos Aires, Argentina, Monoblock publishes young artists and illustrators of Argentina and the world, using designed objects as a canvas, in limited series of art products, stationery, illustrated and comic books, apparel, homeware and decor. Monoblock promotes the work of both local and international artists through open art contests, educative workshops, and art events. Monoblock's products are available internationally in bookstores, design and home decor boutiques, museums and their website. They introduced the concept of illustrated products for the everyday life in Argentina, and the concept of authorship to illustrated products, therefore revolutionizing the local illustration and street art scene, who were not used to be recognized as authors before. The website also offers a profile on each artists who have been published by Monoblock so far.

== History ==
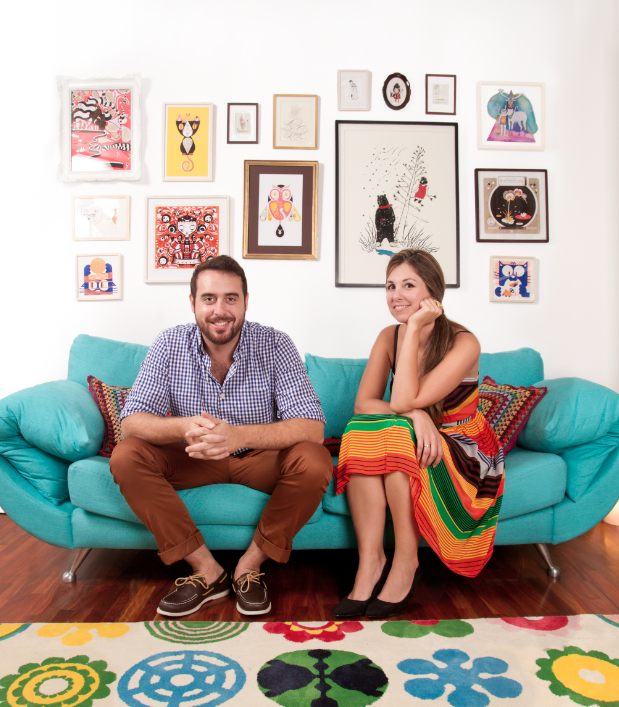
Pablo Galuppo and Vik Arrieta, founders of Monoblock.

Originally, Monoblock functioned as branding agency, but soon Galuppo and Arrieta realized that they were not suited for the advertising world, as they care too much about art. Fascinated with the talented young artists they discovered daily through social networks, and with the conviction that it was possible to create an innovative publishing model for art, they embarked themselves on a new venture. They kept Monoblock as their brand name, and added the tagline Industry of Imagineering.

In 2006, with the support visual artists, designers & illustrators, they created the first series of Designer's Notebooks and launched it nationwide through a major bookstore chain. They chose this product mainly because, as users of notebooks, they could not find one they really liked. Innovation in this first step was subtle but multidimensional as they proposed to recognize the illustrators as authors (rejected the format of collaboration) and redesigned the notebooks to fully exploit their expressive qualities. They decided to work with limited series, each inspired by a single concept. The first carried a universal message of love: Happy together, Live the Love.

Meanwhile, they began to perform shows and exhibitions with each release of a new series, facilitating the encounter between artists and the general public. In 2009 they created —with the support of design magazine 90 +10— Premio Destapa, a new Latin-American Award for Applied Illustration, an opportunity for novice illustrators to be published in a Monoblock notebook. In its first edition, more than 500 illustrators (professionals and amateurs) sent an original artwork. Their efforts to connect and professionalize the field of illustration also extend in the form of lectures and other contents that are always open to the general public.

Since then, Monoblock has expanded to design and produce stationery, journals, accessories, apparel, homeware, decor, games and more recently, books. Monoblock products, particularly their notebooks, have become collectible pieces for buyers because of their limited quantity and original art. Monoblock's products can be found at design and book stores in Argentina, and internationally through their online shop, and at specialty stores.

== VER clothing line ==
In August 2010, Monoblock created, along women's clothing brand VER an 8-piece line of clothing and accessories, designed to exhibit the artwork of 4 local artists. The success of the project kicked off an annual spring VER inspired by Monoblock illustrated line of limited edition apparel for women.

Every edition has a different motto, as in every other Monoblock line of products. On 2010, it was Passionate Nature, with the artwork of Laura Varsky, Fernanda Cohen, Sol Linero and Vik Arrieta. On 2011, Light Warriors, with the artwork of Pum Pum, Irana Douer, Fernanda Cohen and Vik Arrieta. The motto and artists for 2012 are yet to be released.

== Artists ==
Monoblock had publish over 40 artists, including Liniers (cartoonist), Gary Baseman, Catalina Estrada, Alberto Montt, Laura Varsky, Fernanda Cohen, Nate Williams, typographer Ale Paul, Christian Montenegro, Gemma Correll, Patricio Oliver, and other illustrators, designers, photographers, etc.; from Argentina and the rest of the world.

== Awards ==
Recently, Monoblock was recognized with the Puro Diseño Award (Category: Objects) and the Golden Puro Diseño Award to its trajectory.
