= Mono people (Congo) =

Mono, Amono
Total population
- approximately 145,000

Regions with significant populations
- Democratic Republic of Congo

Languages
- Mono language (Congo)

Religion
- Christianity

The Mono people are a Sub-Saharan people of the Sudanic cluster residing on land adjacent to the northwestern border of the Democratic Republic of Congo.
