= Mono (Fury in the Slaughterhouse album) =

Studio album by Fury in the Slaughterhouse
- Released: 1 February 1993
- Recorded: Autumn 1992
- Studios: Peppermint Park Studios, Hannover, Germany
- Genres: Alternative rock; post-grunge
- Length: 44:16
- Labels: SPV; Slaughterhouse Music; RCA
- Producer: Jens Krause

Fury in the Slaughterhouse chronology
Hooka Hey (1991)	Mono (1993)	The Hearing and the Sense of Balance (1995)

Singles from Mono
- 1. "Radio Orchid" Released: 1 January 1993; 2. "Every Generation Got Its Own Disease" Released: 1 June 1993; 3. "When I'm Dead and Gone" Released: 1 June 1994

Professional ratings
Review scores
Source	Rating
AllMusic	2.5/5 stars
Rock and Roll Guru	8.5/10

Mono is the fourth studio album by German rock band Fury in the Slaughterhouse. The album was originally released through SPV and Slaughterhouse Music on 1 February 1993. The album was re-released through RCA Records in 1994, bringing the band an international audience. A remastered version with bonus tracks was released through Kick It Out Records on 29 August 2005.

== About ==
The song "When I'm Dead and Gone" is a cover of the song originally by McGuinness Flint and features drum samples of John Bonham from the Led Zeppelin song "D'yer Mak'er".

== Track listing ==
All tracks are written by Fury in the Slaughterhouse, except where noted.

No.	Title	Writer(s)	Length
1.	"The Brainsong"		2:26
2.	"Every Generation Got Its Own Disease"		5:28
3.	"Dead Before I Was Born"		3:01
4.	"Radio Orchid"		4:37
5.	"Waiting for Paradise"		4:06
6.	"Haunted Head and Heart"	Kai-Uwe Wingenfelder	4:54
7.	"When I'm Dead and Gone" (McGuinness Flint cover)	Benny Gallagher; Graham Lyle	4:06
8.	"When God Goes Home"		4:06
9.	"Friendly Fire"		4:17
10.	"Hell Gets You Nowhere"	K. Wingenfelder	3:48
11.	"Money Rules"	K. Wingenfelder	3:55
12.	"In Your Room"	K. Wingenfelder	3:05
13.	"Money Junkie"		2:40

RCA Records release
No.	Title	Writer(s)	Length
1.	"The Brainsong"		2:26
2.	"Every Generation Got Its Own Disease"		5:28
3.	"Dead Before I Was Born"		3:01
4.	"Radio Orchid"		4:37
5.	"Waiting for Paradise"		4:06
6.	"When I'm Dead and Gone" (McGuinness Flint cover)	Gallagher; Lyle	4:06
7.	"Won't Forget These Days"		4:29
8.	"When God Goes Home"		4:47
9.	"Friendly Fire"		4:16
10.	"Money Rules"	K. Wingenfelder	3:55
11.	"In Your Room"	K. Wingenfelder	3:05

Remastered edition bonus tracks
No.	Title	Writer(s)	Length
14.	"Girl Without a Name" (Demo Version)		3:29
15.	"You'll Never Be Alone" (Theansweringmachinedemoversion)		4:50
16.	"When I'm Dead and Gone" (McGuinness Flint cover; Acoustic Live Radio Show)	Gallagher; Lyle	4:16
17.	"Radio Orchid" (Acoustic Live Radio Show)		4:04
18.	"Every Generation Got Its Own Disease" (Acoustic Live Radio Show)		5:12

== Personnel ==
=== Fury in the Slaughterhouse ===
- Kai-Uwe Wingenfelder – lead vocals
- Thorsten Wingenfelder – guitar, backing vocals
- Christof Stein-Schneider – guitar, backing vocals
- Hannes Schäfer – bass guitar
- Gero Drnek – keyboards, guitar, backing vocals
- Rainer Schumann – drums (except for track 4)

=== Additional musicians ===
- Hilko Schomerus – percussion (tracks 2–8, 10-12)
- Jens Krause – drums (track 4)
- Britt Peters – backing vocals (tracks 4, 7)
- Sabine Bulthaup – backing vocals (track 7)
- Martin Malzahn – backing vocals (track 10)
- Martin Stoll – oboe (track 9)

=== Technical ===
- Jens Krause – production, engineering, mixing
- Donar Kebab – artwork conception and realization
- Olaf Heine – booklet and back cover photography
- Jim Rakete – front cover photography

== Charts ==
=== Weekly charts ===
Chart (1993)	Peak position
German Albums (Offizielle Top 100)	12

=== Year-end charts ===
Chart (1993)	Position
German Albums (Offizielle Top 100)	46

== Certifications ==
Region	Certification	Certified units/sales
Germany (BVMI)	Gold	250,000^{^}
^{*} Sales figures based on certification alone.^{^} Shipments figures based on certification alone.
