= Wathlingen =

- Municipality
- Flag Coat of arms

- Location of Wathlingen within Celle district
- Interactive map of Wathlingen
- Location within Germany Location within Lower Saxony
- Coordinates: 52°31′N 10°9′E
- Country: Germany
- State: Lower Saxony
- District: Celle
- Municipal assoc.: Wathlingen

Government
  - Mayor: Torsten Harms (CDU)

Area
  - Total: 17.68 km^{2} (6.83 sq mi)
- Elevation: 43 m (141 ft)

Population (2025-12-31)
  - Total: 6,350
  - Density: 359/km^{2} (930/sq mi)
- Time zone: UTC+01:00 (CET)
  - Summer (DST): UTC+02:00 (CEST)
- Postal codes: 29339
- Dialling codes: 05144
- Vehicle registration: CE
- Website: gemeinde-wathlingen.de

Wathlingen (Eastphalian: Wateln) is a municipality in the district of Celle, in Lower Saxony, Germany. It is situated approximately 10 km southeast of Celle.

Wathlingen is also the seat of the Samtgemeinde ("collective municipality") Wathlingen.
