= Non-mono =

Non-mono or nonmono may also refer to:

- Non-monoamory, a relationship structure
- Non-monogamy, a relationship structure
- Non-monoromantic, the equivalent romantic orientation
- Non-monosexuality, anyone not attracted to only one gender

== See also ==
- Non-monotonic logic
- Non-monobloc cylinder block
- Nonono (disambiguation)
