= Fury in the Slaughterhouse =

German rock band

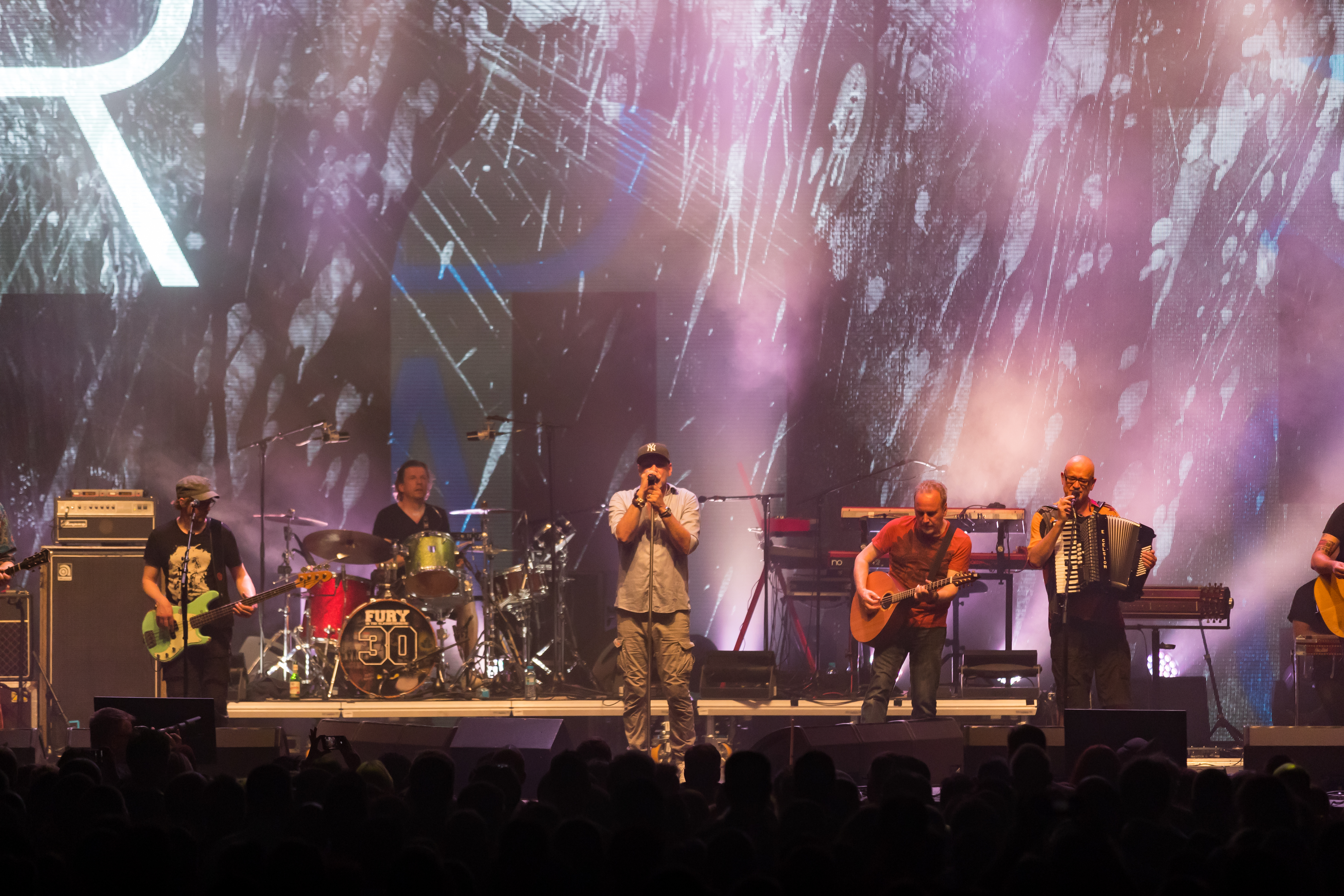
- Fury in the Slaughterhouse performing at the Zeltfestival Rhein-Neckar in Mannheim, 2017

Background information
- Also known as: Fury
- Origin: Hanover, West Germany
- Genres: Alternative rock; post-grunge
- Years active: 1987–2008; 2013; 2017–present
- Labels: RCA; EMI; Sony; SPV; Starwatch; Slaughterhouse Music; Pinpoint
- Members: Kai-Uwe Wingenfelder; Thorsten Wingenfelder; Christof Stein-Schneider; Rainer Schumann; Christian Decker; Gero Drnek
- Past members: Hannes Schäfer; Kai Liekenbröcker
- Website: fury.de

Fury in the Slaughterhouse is a German rock band from Hannover, Lower Saxony, founded in 1987. Their hits include "Time to Wonder", "Every Generation Got Its Own Disease", "Won't Forget These Days", "Radio Orchid", "Dancing in the Sunshine of the Dark", "Milk and Honey" and "Trapped Today, Trapped Tomorrow".

The band disbanded in 2008 before reuniting in June 2013 at the Expo Plaza Festival in Hanover for only one show, and reunited again in 2017 for a nationwide tour which started with three dates at the TUI Arena, Hanover, in March. The reunited band released their first album in 13 years, Now on 23 April 2021.

== History ==
In December 1986, the brothers Kai (vocals) and Thorsten Wingenfelder (guitar/vocals) founded the band Fury in the Slaughterhouse together with drummer Rainer Schumann, guitarist Christof Stein-Schneider and bassist Hannes Schäfer in Hanover. Keyboardist Gero Drnek joined in 1989. The band name means riot in the slaughterhouse, but according to another source it refers to the US children's series from the 1950s about a horse named Fury, which was shown on German television in the mid-1980s. Fury in the Slaughterhouse was supposed to be a mainstream rock band, which differed significantly from the punk-electronic influenced Neue Deutsche Welle movement sung in German, so all song lyrics were written in English. In 1988 the band played sold-out concerts and their first albums made it into the top 50 of the German album charts.

In 1992, their record company SPV and BMG Ariola founded the music label Slaughterhouse Music. The band now ventured live to Europe and the Anglo-American region, where they made their breakthrough in 1993 with the hits "Radio Orchid" and "Every Generation Got Its Own Disease" and the album Mono. The band opened for Meat Loaf on his 1994 tour. The albums Mono and The Hearing and the Sense of Balance were released in the US with altered track lists.

In 1996, Hannes Schäfer left the band and the music industry, and was replaced by bassist Christian Decker. In 2005 the band founded the record label Kick It Out. Their earlier albums have been reissued in revised versions with additional unreleased tracks. In 2006 the band signed the city of Hanover's Golden Book.

Fury in the Slaughterhouse sold over four million albums and played at more than 1000 concerts and festivals worldwide during the band's first run.

A farewell tour through Germany took place from March until the band's planned breakup at the end of August 2008. All concerts were recorded and could be purchased on USB sticks immediately after the concert. The band's final performance in Hanover was also published as a double DVD (director: Marc Schütrumpf ) and on CD under the name Farewell & Goodbye.

In 2011, the band reunited briefly and played their hit "Won't Forget These Days" in the stadium after a home game at Hannover 96.

On 8 June 2013, the band (with guests) performed a one-off concert in Hanover (Expo-Plaza / Messe) under the motto One City - One Band; 25,000 visitors saw the concert.

On 10, 11 and 12 March 2017, the band celebrated their 30th anniversary with three reunion concerts in the TUI-Arena in Hanover. For the first time since the dissolution in 2008, Fury recorded a new song, "The Last Order", which was presented on 3 February 2017 on Radio ffn and played as the opener at these concerts. They also released a new 2 CD best of called 30 - The Ultimate Best Of, which also featured an EP with "The Last Order" and five other new songs. Due to the successful advance sales of these three concerts, the band decided to play more concerts in Germany over the summer of 2017. According to the band's website, however, this was not the beginning of a reunion, just a show of respect to the fans.

They went on to play an acoustic tour in the fall of 2017, which was released as a double live album called Little Big World - Live & Acoustic. For this album/tour, they were joined by pedal steel guitarist Martin Huch and cellist Anne De Wolff. The band continued their performances at large festivals in the following years, but had to cancel tour dates in spring 2020 due to the COVID-19 pandemic. In Hanover that year, however, they played two concerts on the Schützenplatz on 14 and 15 May 2020 in front of around 2000 spectators sitting in their cars as part of the so-called car culture series.

On 22 October 2020, the officially reunited band announced a new studio album titled Now, the first in 13 years for release in April 2021. All of the band's studio albums are now available in the US, as the result of the band changing record labels to Starwatch. Now was released on 23 April 2021, and was followed up by another album, "Hope," released on 28 July 2023, which debuted on the German charts as the band's first #1 album. On 26 June 2026, the band released their third album since reuniting, titled "Changes".

== Band members ==
Current members

- Kai-Uwe Wingenfelder (1987–present) – vocals
- Thorsten Wingenfelder (1987–present) – guitar, vocals
- Christof Stein-Schneider (1987–present) – guitar
- Rainer Schumann (1987–present) – drums
- Christian Decker (1996–present) – bass guitar
- Gero Drnek (1989–present) – keyboards, guitar, mandolin

Former members

- Hannes Schäfer (1987–1996) – bass guitar
- Kai Liekenbröcker (1988–1989) – keyboards

== Discography ==
=== Studio albums ===
List of studio albums, with selected chart positions and certifications
Title	Album details	Peak chart positions		Certifications
Title	Album details	GER	SWI	Certifications
Fury in the Slaughterhouse	Released: 1988; Label: Pinpoint	—	—	GER: Gold
Jau!	Released: 26 March 1990; Label: SPV	43	—	
Hooka Hey	Released: 1 March 1991; Label: SPV	32	—	
Mono	Released: 1 February 1993; Label: RCA	12	—	GER: Gold
The Hearing and the Sense of Balance	Released: 1 February 1995; Label: RCA	6	—	GER: Gold
Brilliant Thieves	Released: 3 March 1997; Label: Slaughterhouse Music (SPV)	3	—	GER: Gold
Nowhere…Fast!	Released: 25 May 1998; Label: Slaughterhouse Music (SPV)	5	—	
Home Inside	Released: 29 May 2000; Label: Electrola	9	—	
The Color Fury	Released: 2 April 2002; Label: Electrola	13	—	
Nimby	Released: 22 March 2004; Label: SPV	19	—	
Every Heart Is a Revolutionary Cell	Released: 28 June 2006; Label: SPV	30	—	
Don't Look Back	Released: 28 March 2008; Label: SPV	33	—	
Now	Released: 23 April 2021; Label: Starwatch	2	80	
Hope	Released: 28 July 2023; Label: Starwatch	1	83	
Changes	Released: 26 June 2026; Label: Starwatch	2	—	
"—" denotes a recording that did not chart or was not released in that territory.

=== Live albums ===
List of live albums, with selected chart positions
Title	Album details	Peak chart positions
Title	Album details	GER
Pure Live!	Released: 27 January 1992; Label: SPV	21
Monochrome	Released: 28 October 2002; Label: SPV	82
Château Fury – Appellation Slaughterhouse Contrôlée	Released: 11 July 2005; Label: SPV	38
Farewell & Goodbye Tour 2008	Released: 21 November 2008; Label: Warner	63
Little Big World – Live & Acoustic	Released: 21 November 2008; Label: Starwatch	5
Fahrvergnügen – Drive in Concerts 2020	Released: 23 April 2021; Label: Starwatch	—
"—" denotes a recording that did not chart or was not released in that territory.

=== Compilation albums ===
List of compilation albums, with selected chart positions
Title	Album details	Peak chart positions
Title	Album details	GER
Super Fury	Released: 17 November 1998; Label: Slaughterhouse Music (SPV)	20
30 – The Ultimate Best of Collection	Released: 10 March 2017; Label: Starwatch	3

=== Singles ===
List of singles, with selected chart positions, showing year released and album name
Single	Year	Peak chart positions			Album
Single	Year	GER	US Mod Rock	US Main Rock	Album
"Time to Wonder"	1988	—	—	—	Fury in the Slaughterhouse
"Kick It Out"	1989	—	—	—	Fury in the Slaughterhouse
"Won't Forget These Days"	1990	—	—	—	Jau!
"One Good Reason (To Go) / Tears and Fears"	1990	—	—	—	Jau!
"Rain Will Fall"	1990	—	—	—	Hooka Hey
"Cut Myself into Pieces"	1991	—	—	—	Hooka Hey
"Trapped Today, Trapped Tomorrow"	1991	—	—	—	Hooka Hey
"On Alarm"	1992	—	—	—	Jau!
"Won't Forget These Days" (SPA only)	1992	—	—	—	Jau!
"Radio Orchid"	1993	59	—	—	Mono
"Every Generation Got Its Own Disease"	1993	44	13	21	Mono
"When I'm Dead and Gone"	1994	44	—	—	Mono
"Dead Before I Was Born" (US promo only)	1994	—	—	—	Mono
"Dancing in the Sunshine of the Dark"	1995	—	—	—	The Hearing and the Sense of Balance
"Down There"	1995	83	—	—	The Hearing and the Sense of Balance
"Milk and Honey"	1995	94	—	—	The Hearing and the Sense of Balance
"Hello and Goodbye"	1996	97	—	—	The Hearing and the Sense of Balance
"Riding on a Dead Horse" (GER promo only)	1997	—	—	—	Brilliant Thieves
"Bring Me Home"	1997	—	—	—	Brilliant Thieves
"Brilliant Thieves"	1997	92	—	—	Brilliant Thieves
"Everything I Did"	1998	—	—	—	Nowhere…Fast!
"One Way Dead End Street"	1998	—	—	—	Nowhere…Fast!
"Won't Forget These Days (Remix)"	1999	—	—	—	Super Fury
"Are You Real?"	2000	91	—	—	Home Inside
"Do You Feel?"	2000	—	—	—	Home Inside
"She's a Star"	2001	—	—	—	Home Inside
"Angels & Saints"	2002	—	—	—	The Color Fury
"Midnight Rider"	2002	—	—	—	The Color Fury
"Protection"	2004	—	—	—	Nimby
"Homesick"	2006	—	—	—	Every Heart Is a Revolutionary Cell
"Radio Orchid (Live)"	2008	—	—	—	Farewell & Goodbye Tour 2008
"The Last Order"	2017	—	—	—	30 – The Ultimate Best of Collection
"Dance on the Frontline"	2017	—	—	—	30 – The Ultimate Best of Collection
"30 (It's Not Easy)"	2017	—	—	—	30 – The Ultimate Best of Collection
"Boy's Dont Cry (Live & Acoustic)"	2017	—	—	—	Farewell & Goodbye Tour 2008
"We Believe in Sometimes"	2020	—	—	—	Non-album single
"Sometimes (Stop to Call)"	2020	—	—	—	Now
"The Beauty"	2020	—	—	—	Now
"1995"	2021	—	—	—	Now
"Letter to Myself"	2021	—	—	—	Now
"Good Day to Remember"	2022	—	—	—	Non-album single
"Better Times Will Come"	2022	—	—	—	Hope
"So Are You"	2022	—	—	—	Hope
"9 Lives"	2026	—	—	—	Changes
"Viva La Revolución"	2026	—	—	—	Changes
"When We Were Young"	2026	—	—	—	Changes
"Fix This Crack"	2026	—	—	—	Changes
"—" denotes a single that did not chart or was not released in that territory.

=== Video albums ===
- Clicksongs & Peppermint Stories (1991)
- Especially Ordinary (1997)
- Monochrome (2002)
- The Videos 1988–2008 (2008)
- Farewell & Goodbye Tour 2008 (2008)
- Welcome to the Other World – Nimby Live 2004 (2010)
