= Cellesche Zeitung =

German local newspaper

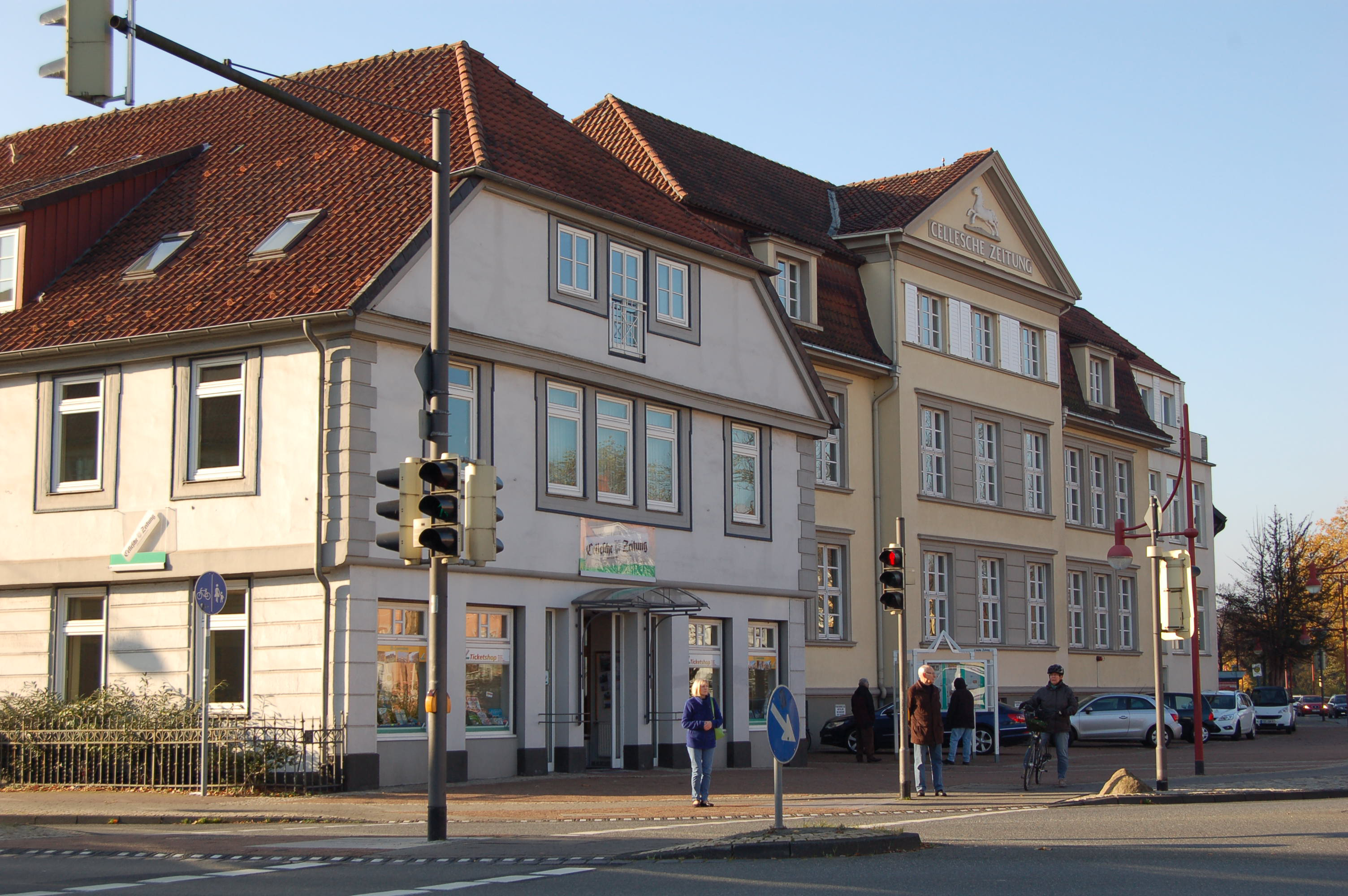
- Publishing house
- Editor: Ralf Leineweber
- Managers: Friederike Pfingsten, Werner Heyer
- Frequency: Monday to Saturday
- Format: German daily newspaper
- Publisher: Schweiger & Pick Verlag Pfingsten GmbH & Co. KG
- First issue: 2 April 1817 (as the Zellescher Anzeiger)
- Language: German
- Website: www.cellesche-zeitung.de

The Cellesche Zeitung is a medium-size local newspaper with a circulation of 32,200. It is distributed in the town and district of Celle in North Germany by Schweiger & Pick Verlag. Apart from the periphery of its area with Hanover Region, where it also competes with the Hannoversche Allgemeine Zeitung, the Cellesche Zeitung has a monopoly over local reporting.

Despite its moderate scale, the newspaper has its own full editorial team which produces not only local news, but also pan-regional features on politics, the economy and sport.

== Sources ==
- Ulrich Pätzold/Horst Röper: Medienatlas Niedersachsen-Bremen 2000. Medienkonzentration – Meinungsmacht – Interessenverflechtung. Verlag Buchdruckwerkstätten Hannover GmbH, Hannover 2000, ISBN 3-89384-043-5
- Jörg Aufermann/Victor Lis/Volkhard Schuster: Zeitungen in Niedersachsen und Bremen. Handbuch 2000. Verband Nordwestdeutscher Zeitungsverleger/Zeitungsverlegerverband Bremen, Hannover/Bremen 2000, ISBN 3-9807158-0-9
