= Wathlingen (Samtgemeinde) =

- Samtgemeinde
- Location of Wathlingen within Celle district
- Interactive map of Wathlingen
- Location within Germany Location within Lower Saxony
- Coordinates: 52°33′N 10°04′E
- Country: Germany
- State: Lower Saxony
- District: Celle
- Seat: Wathlingen
- Subdivisions: 3 municipalities

Area
  - Total: 68.67 km^{2} (26.51 sq mi)

Population (2025-12-31)
  - Total: 15,424
  - Density: 224.6/km^{2} (581.7/sq mi)
- Time zone: UTC+01:00 (CET)
  - Summer (DST): UTC+02:00 (CEST)
- Website: www.wathlingen.de

Wathlingen is a Samtgemeinde ("collective municipality") in the district of Celle, in Lower Saxony, Germany. Its seat is in Wathlingen.

The Samtgemeinde Wathlingen consists of the following municipalities:

1. Adelheidsdorf
2. Nienhagen
3. Wathlingen
