= Rick J. Jordan =

German musician and producer (born 1968)

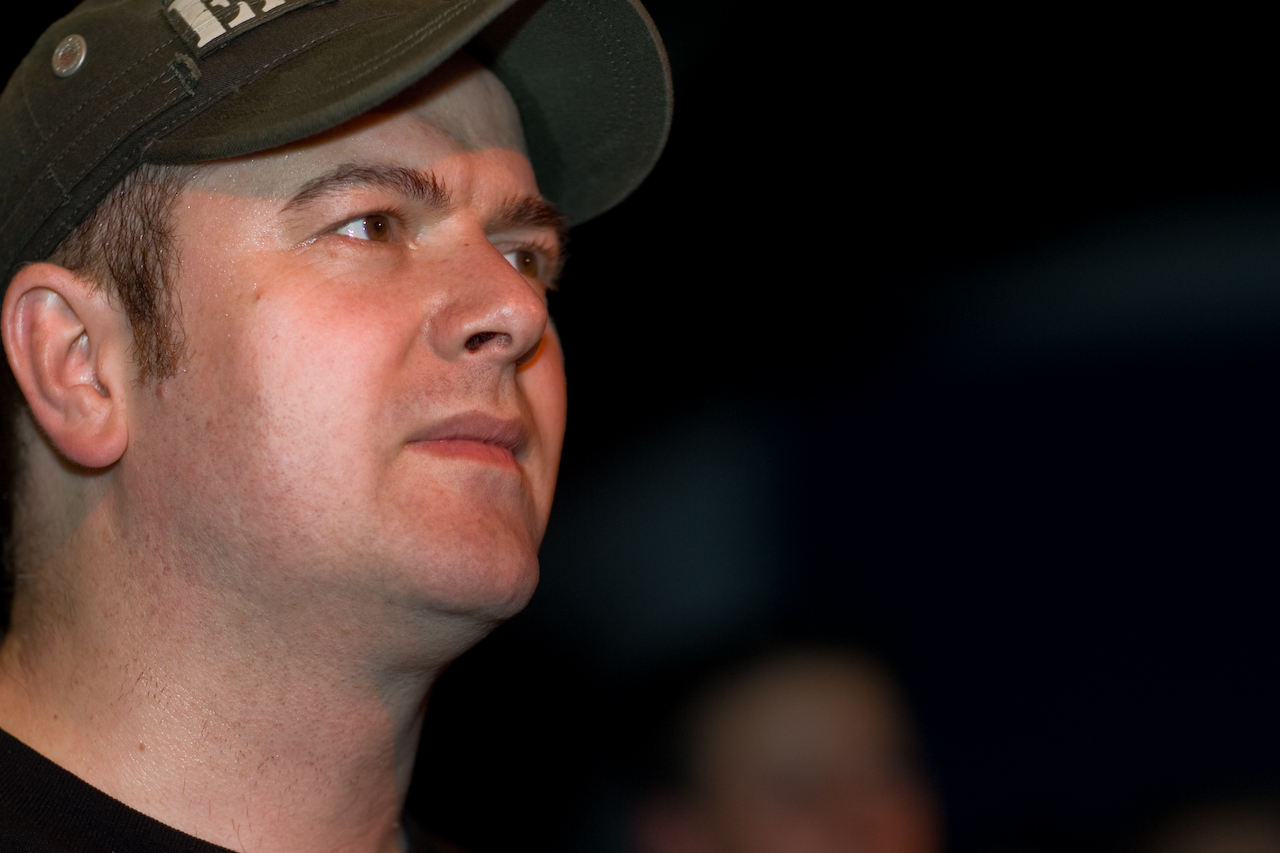
- Rick J. Jordan in May 2007.

Background information
- Born: Hendrik Stedler; 1 January 1968 (age 58)
- Origin: Hannover, West Germany
- Genres: EDM
- Occupations: Musician, sound designer, audio engineer, composer
- Instruments: Computer engineering, keyboard, guitar, drums
- Years active: 1983–present
- Website: www.scootertechno.com

Rick J. Jordan (born Hendrik Stedler, 1 January 1968) is a German music producer, composer, multi-instrumentalist, audio engineer and sound designer, best known for his work in the German band Scooter.

== Youth and early years ==
Rick Jordan learned to play the piano at age five, and in adulthood completed his studies as a sound mixer.

== Music ==
Before Scooter, Rick founded the band Celebrate the Nun, together with H.P. Baxxter. He also played keyboards in the Hanover bands Laser, Megabyte, Die Matzingers and Never Delay.

=== Scooter ===
Rick Jordan was mainly responsible for co-composing, sound design aspects and melodic production elements for Scooter until the beginning of 2014. He was doing the engineering mixdown for all Scooter and related productions from 1994 until he left the band.

Jordan left Scooter around late 2013–early 2014, and his last concert with the band was on 24 January 2014 in Hamburg.

From mid-2016 to early 2018 he produced instrumental music from the "Classical Crossover" genre together with the Bulgarian concert pianist and composer Alexander Raytchev. The first work, Glassmærchen, was premiered in Berlin on 15 December 2016.

Since then Rick J. Jordan has been a producer, and as bassist he is a member of the indie rock formation Leichtmatrose.

In 2020 Jordan produced a new version of the song "Nein, meine Söhne geb' ich nicht" by Reinhard Mey together with 17 other artists, including Reinhard Mey himself. The resulting music video asked for donations for the NGO Friedensdorf International in the credits and was viewed over 5.5 million times on Youtube (as of January 2022).

=== Discography ===
List of productions outside of Scooter and Celebrate the Nun:

- 1985 – Die Matzingers – Neandertal (album)
- 1991 – S.A.X. – Marrakesh
- 1992 – La Toya – Let's rock the House (J. Jordan Dub)
- 1993 – Fine Time Poets – Unicorn
- 1994 – Hysteria – The Flood
- 1994 – Community feat. Fonda Rae – Parade (The Loop! mix)
- 1994 – Clinique Team feat. The Hannover Posse – Summer of Love
- 1994 – Holly Johnson – Legendary Children (The Loop! mix)
- 1994 – Tony Di Bart – The Real Thing (The Loop! mix)
- 1994 – Ru Paul – Everybody Dance (The Loop! mix)
- 1994 – Adeva – Respect (The Loop! mix)
- 1994 – Tag Team – Here It Is, Bam! (The Loop! mix)
- 1994 – Crown of Creation – Real Life (album, production)
- 1995 – Kosmos feat. Mary K – Codo
- 1995 – Prince Ital Joe feat. Marky Mark – Babylon (The Loop! mix)
- 1995 – Nu Love – Can you feel the Love tonight
- 1995 – Chiron – I show you (The Loop! mix)
- 1996 – Sunbeam – Arms of Heaven
- 1996 – Sunbeam – Dreams
- 1996 – DJ Hooligan – I want you (The Loop! mix)
- 1998 – Clubtone – Put a little Love in your Heart (The Loop! mix)
- 1998 – D.O.N.S. feat. Technotronic – Pump up the Jam (The Loop! mix)
- 1999 – Chrome & Price – Sunrise (Loop D.C. Mix)
- 2008 – Sheffield Jumpers – Jump with me

== Personal life ==
Rick is married to Nikk (Nicole Sukar), who has also occasionally performed for Scooter with her natural voice, as well as ‘pitched’ both on stage and some songs like Jigga Jigga!, Nessaja or Friends. Nikk was the former singer of Crown of Creation from Hanover.

They had a daughter born on 21 August 2007, named Keira.

== Bibliography ==
- Matthias Blazek: Das niedersächsische Bandkompendium 1963–2003 – Daten und Fakten von 100 Rockgruppen aus Niedersachsen. Celle 2006 ISBN 978-3-00-018947-0
