= Adelheidsdorf =

- Municipality
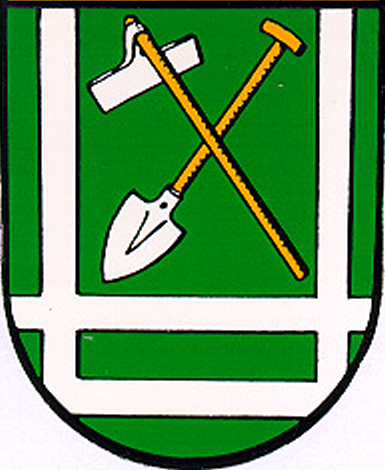
- Coat of arms

- Location of Adelheidsdorf within Celle district
- Interactive map of Adelheidsdorf
- Location within Germany Location within Lower Saxony
- Coordinates: 52°33′56″N 10°03′38″E
- Country: Germany
- State: Lower Saxony
- District: Celle
- Municipal assoc.: Wathlingen
- Subdivisions: 3 Ortsteile

Government
  - Mayor: Heike Behrens (CDU)

Area
  - Total: 33.27 km^{2} (12.85 sq mi)
- Elevation: 41 m (135 ft)

Population (2025-12-31)
  - Total: 2,681
  - Density: 80.58/km^{2} (208.7/sq mi)
- Time zone: UTC+01:00 (CET)
  - Summer (DST): UTC+02:00 (CEST)
- Postal codes: 29352
- Dialling codes: 05085, 05141
- Vehicle registration: CE
- Website: www.wathlingen.de

Adelheidsdorf (German pronunciation: [ˈaːdl̩haɪtsdɔʁf]) is a municipality in the district of Celle, in Lower Saxony, Germany.

Adelheidsdorf was founded in 1831 after draining parts of the Wietzenbruch swamps in the area and named after Queen Adelaide.
