= Monolight =

Photographic flash unit

A monolight is a self-contained photographic flash lighting unit typically found in studios. Bowens introduced the first in 1963. Each monolight has its own independent power source. It does not depend on a centralized power supply as a "pack and head" system does. Monolights are also independently controlled: each has its own power settings and light output. Flash power is predominantly measured by the industry in watt seconds, which is unit-equivalent to the joule.

== Construction ==
A simple monolight at a minimum consists of a power supply, power connector, and flash tube. Most monolights have a fairly common set of features, described below.

=== Common features ===
Most monolights have several features in common:

- Flashtube/strobe bulb — The bulb that creates the flash.
- Modeling light — A continuous light that illuminates the subject and aids the photographer in composing the picture.
- Power connector — The receptacle for the power cord.
- Power switch — A switch to turn the monolight on and off.
- Slave sensor — A sensor that detects the flashes of other strobes and triggers the strobe of which it is a part.
- A mounting for light modifiers, including a simple reflector, Umbrella socket, soft box etc. The Bowens' S-Mount is a common standard.
- Stand socket — A device on the unit that allows it to be mounted on a standard light stand.

=== Additional features ===
In addition to those features listed above, monolights may also have the following features:

- Output control - Allows the intensity of the flash to be adjusted down or up to the maximum power output of the flash unit.
- Model light tracking - Allows the modeling light to increase and decrease with the strobe when the strobe fires.
- Auto dumping – the ability to partially discharge the light's capacitors when the output power is reduced. Without this feature, when the light's output is turned down, it has to be fired to fully discharge the capacitors, then the capacitors recharged up to the new lower level.
- Power recycle indicator - A light or sound emitter or both which tell the photographer that the flash has fired, and is currently charging.
- Remote control - either wired (through a telephone jack to a handheld control) or wireless. Remotes may allow the user to adjust light output, modelling lamp intensity, etc.

== Considerations of a good monolight ==
Monolights are photographic flashes and therefore carry some of the same considerations as a standard flash unit. A primary concern is guide number. Each monolight has a guide number specifying its range at certain film speeds. A common misconception is that the watt-second measurement is an indication of light output. It is not; it is a measure of electrical energy. While the electrical energy used in firing the flash is usually the most significant factor, light output is also affected by the efficiency of the flash tube and the capacitor.

In addition to power output, monolights have other, special considerations as they are meant to be used for large-scale, studio work. Portability, consistency, feature set, parts availability and cost are prime considerations in monolights.

=== Portability ===
Monolights are larger than most on-camera strobes. As such portability issues must be considered:

==== Size and weight ====
Monolights are sometimes referred to as monoblocks due to the containment of all power and controls in each individual flash unit. Consequently, monolights usually weigh more than on-camera flashes. As monolights need to be placed on light stands, the size and weight of each light stand must also be considered. This size and weight must also be weighed against a pack and head system, which typically have a much weightier generator box.

==== Power requirements ====
Monolights are independently powered and therefore require individual power connections. Monolights become less practical in situations where power outlets are scarce.

=== Consistency ===
Monolight consistency refers to the power output of the unit from flash to flash. Good monolights will vary little from one flash to another. Monolights that vary greatly (more than 1/5 of an f-stop) are said to be inconsistent. Inconsistent monolights makes computing the appropriate aperture next to impossible due to the variable light output.

Since monolights often vary the capacitor charge to vary the light output, lower voltage through the tube can affect the flash's color temperature. Some units have electronics to compensate and maintain a steady color temperature through the power range.

=== Features ===
A monolight's features make it more versatile, but it also makes a monolight more expensive. A good monolight generally has all the features listed above in the Common Features section.

=== Availability of accessories and parts ===
Procuring replacement parts and accessories for monolights is also a consideration. Monolights made by mainstream companies generally have a higher parts availability in more places than off-brand products. This is a strong consideration when using monolights on a location shoot. Accessories tend to be more readily available for on-brand monolights.
