= Scooter Forever =

Studio album by Scooter
- Released: 1 September 2017
- Recorded: 2016–2017
- Studio: Sheffield Underground Studios (Hamburg, Germany)
- Label: Sheffield Tunes; Kontor
- Producer: Scooter

Scooter chronology
Ace (2016)	Scooter Forever (2017)	100% Scooter – 25 Years Wild & Wicked (2017)

Singles from Scooter Forever
- 1. "Bora! Bora! Bora!" Released: 26 May 2017; 2. "My Gabber" Released: 29 August 2017; 3. "In Rave We Trust – Amateur Hour (Anthem Mix)" Released: 6 December 2017

Professional ratings
Review scores
Source	Rating
Random.Access	9/10

Scooter Forever is the nineteenth studio album by German band Scooter, released on 1 September 2017 through Sheffield Tunes and Kontor Records. It is the last studio album featuring Phil Speiser, who had been with the band since 2014.

== Track listing ==
All lyrics are written by H.P. Baxxter, except "My Gabber" lyrics by Tim Kimman, Eelco van Proosdij, and David van Akkeren.

Disc 1
No.	Title	Writer(s)	Length
1.	"Foreplay"	H.P. Baxxter; Phil Speiser; Michael Simon; Jens Thele	1:44
2.	"In Rave We Trust"	Ron Mael; Russell Mael	3:16
3.	"Bora! Bora! Bora!"	Michele Chieregato; Roberto Turatti; Fiorenzo Zanotti; Thomas Beecher Hooker; Baxxter; Speiser; Simon; Thele	3:12
4.	"My Gabber" (with JeBroer)	Tim Kimman; Eelco van Proosdij; David van Akkeren; Baxxter; Speiser; Simon; Thele	2:55
5.	"Wall of China (See the Light)"	Mark Brady; Andre Bruinewoud; Brian Stuart Connor; Robert Alan Grice; Mandy Keen; Darren James Mew	4:08
6.	"Shooting Stars (Move It to the Left)"	Baxxter; Speiser; Simon; Thele; David Stoltzenberg	3:46
7.	"When I'm Raving"	Baxxter; Speiser; Simon; Thele; Emma Rosen	3:12
8.	"Scooter Forever"	Baxxter; Speiser; Simon; Thele; Rosen	3:22
9.	"As the Years Go By"	Peter Hans Gösta Grönvall; Marianne Elisabeth Grönvall; Maria Ingela Kristina Rådsten Ekman; Robert (Brd) Jung	2:59
10.	"Wild and Wicked"	Baxxter; Speiser; Simon; Thele; Rosen	2:59
11.	"The Roof"	Kenny Young; Baxxter; Speiser; Simon; Thele; Rosen	3:22
12.	"Kiss Goodnight"	Alexander Gerlach; Tomasz Kuklicz; Kai Paul; Nicole Sherice White; Baxxter; Speiser; Simon; Thele	4:00
13.	"Kill the Cat" (with Dave202)	Davide Tropeano; Michel Lüchinger; Maurizio Colella; Baxxter; Speiser; Simon; Thele	3:32
14.	"The Darkside"	Cengiz Özmaden; Frank Kuchinke	2:55
15.	"Always Look on the Bright Side of Life"	Eric Idle	2:18

Disc 2: Selected rave classics reworked by Scooter
No.	Title	Writer(s)	Original artist	Length
1.	"Universal Nation"	M.I.K.E.	Push	4:31
2.	"Symmetry C"	A.C. Boutsen	Brainchild	3:41
3.	"Unfuture"	Pascal F.E.O.S.	Sonic Infusion	3:14
4.	"The First Rebirth"	Frank Sels, Axel Stephenson	Jones & Stephenson	4:08
5.	"Sacred Cycles"	Peter James Lazonby	Lazonby	3:23
6.	"Burning Phibes"	Jürgen Driessen, Oliver Jagarzewski	Infrequent Oscillation	3:46
7.	"Lost in Love"	Jens Ahrens, Peter Blase	Legend B.	3:32
8.	"The House of House"	Yves Deruyter, Franky Kloeck, Axel Stephenson	Cherrymoon Trax	3:54
9.	"Lost in Space"	Cet Merlin	Space Frog	3:56
10.	"Tales of Mystery"	Thomas Wedel, Norman Feller, Legado	DJ Tom & Norman	3:19

Notes

- "In Rave We Trust" retitled "In Rave We Trust - Amateur Hour" on later versions.
- The 2023-reissue omits the tracks "Universal Nation", "The First Rebirth" and "The House of House".

Sample credits

- "Foreplay" contains a sample interpolation of Smack My Bitch Up by The Prodigy.
- "In Rave We Trust" contains an interpolation of the 1974 song "Amateur Hour" by Sparks.
- "Bora! Bora! Bora!" contains an interpolation of the 1986 song "Catch the Fox (Caccia Alla Volpe)" by Den Harrow. The melody has previously been used by Scooter in the song "The United Vibe" from the 2007 album The Ultimate Aural Orgasm. Both Scooter songs are probably inspired by the 2003 song "Goin' Crazy (Cum Fiesta)" by Hard Body Babes.
- "My Gabber" is an English version of the 2016 song "Me Gabber" originally performed by JeBroer.
- "Wall Of China (See the Light)" is based on the 2007 song "See the Light (Styles & Breeze Remix)" by Paradise.
- "As the Years Go By" contains an interpolation of the 1999 song "Ein Lied für diese Welt" by Dana Winner.
- "The Roof" contains an interpolation of the 1974 song "Only You Can" by Fox.
- "Kiss Goodnight" contains an interpolation of the 2002 song "Let's Play" by Lexy & K-Paul feat. Atomek Dogg.
- "The Darkside" is a rework of the 1999 song by Hypetraxx.
- "Always Look on the Bright Side of Life" is based on the same name 1979 song taken from the motion picture Monty Python's Life of Brian.

== Charts ==
Chart (2017)	Peak position
Austrian Albums (Ö3 Austria)	17
Czech Albums (ČNS IFPI)	11
German Albums (Offizielle Top 100)	8
Hungarian Albums (MAHASZ)	4
Polish Albums (ZPAV)	20
Slovak Albums (ČNS IFPI)	40
Swiss Albums (Schweizer Hitparade)	32
UK Dance Albums (OCC)	5
