= See You in the Next Life (song) =

1999 single by Atlantis ITA featuring Ithaka

Single by Atlantis ITA (featuring Ithaka)
- Released: 19 January 1999
- Genre: Trance music; hard trance; acid trance
- Length: 8:32
- Label: Infusion (UK); Overdose (Germany)
- Songwriters: Dino Lenny; Chris Huelsbeck; Ithaka Darin Pappas
- Producers: Dino Lenny; Alessandro Foietta; Marco Capelli

Atlantis ITA (featuring Ithaka) singles chronology
"See You in the Next Life" (1999)	"The Good Land" (2001)

Music video
- "See You In The Next Life" on YouTube

"See You in the Next Life" is a 1999 hard trance/acid trance song by Italian electronic music group Atlantis ITA featuring Californian lyricist-vocalist Ithaka (nine-time Prémio Blitz nominee). It was released by Overdose Records in Germany and Infusion Records in the UK. Members of Atlantis ITA include Alessandro Foietta, Dino Lenny, and Marco Capelli.

After being included on 1999's "Essential Millennium" compilation compiled by Pete Tong, Fatboy Slim and Paul Oakenfold (released by London Recordings), "See You In The Next Life", by Atlantis ITA featuring Ithaka, peaked in the #91 position on the UK Singles Charts in August of 2000. In 2001, "See You In The Next Life" was released a second time, as the B-Side of their following single, "The Good Land". The record peaked at #96 on the UK Singles charts.

== Reception ==
The online platform Record Days says of the song, "See You In The Next Life masterfully blends ethereal melodies with introspective lyrics, exploring themes of hope and transcendence. A haunting sonic journey, it cements Atlantis ITA's unique artistry in the contemporary music scene.

== Film appearance ==
The song is played over the closing titles sequence of the British feature film Sorted, directed by Alexander Jovy and starring Matthew Rhys, Sienna Guillory, Ben Moor and Tim Curry.

== Track listing (including official mixes) ==
=== 1999 ===
- See You in the Next Life [Infusion Records, UK]
1. "See You in the Next Life" (Original Mix) — 8:32
2. "See You in the Next Life" (Original Mix) — 7:30
- See You in the Next Life [Overdose Records, Germany]
1. "See You in the Next Life" (Original Mix) — 8:32
2. "See You in the Next Life" (DJ Scot Project Remix) — 9:12

=== 2000 ===
- See You in the Next Life (CD maxi-single) [Intercode Records, Germany]
1. "See You in the Next Life" (Radio Mix) — 3:35
2. "See You in the Next Life" (Original Mix) — 8:29
3. "See You in the Next Life" (DJ Scot Project Remix) — 9:12
4. "See You in the Next Life" (Push Remix) — 7:37

=== 2001 ===
- See You in the Next Life (Vinyl 12") [Biotex Records, Italy]
1. "See You in the Next Life" (2001 Remix) — 7:00
2. "See You in the Next Life" (Original Mix) — 6:00
3. "See You in the Next Life" (Push Remix) — 5:20
- The Good Land (Vinyl 12") [Infusion, UK]
1. "The Good Land (Main Mix)
2. "See You in the Next Life (Push Remix)

=== 2021 ===
- See You in the Next Life (File, MP3) [Jams Records, UK]
1. "See You in nhe Next Life" (Original Mix) — 4:51

== DJ support ==
Thru the last several decades many respected DJs have included "See You in the Next Life" in their live sets or on broadcast playlists, including: Paul Oakenfold: Live @ Homelands, Mosney, Ireland - December 25, 1999. Paul Van Dyk: @1LIVE Partyservice, Best Of Clubtracks 1999 - January 1, 2000, and Orkidea: Club Unity, Helsinki, Finland - October 7, 2006,

== Sonic inspirations, samples and lyrics ==
Atlantis ITA's (original mix) instrumental itself was largely borrowed from "Freedom" by Chris Huelsbeck (featured in the soundtrack of the video game Turrican II: The Final Fight).

Ithaka Darin Pappas' lyrics for "See You in the Next Left" were taken from his own early rhyming spoken-word poem, So Get Up.

== Remixes ==
=== DJ Scot Project Remix ===
"See You in the Next Life" (DJ Scot Project Remix) was created in by DJ Scot Project (aka Frank Zenker), from Frankfurt, Germany, known by some as The King of The King of Hardtrance. His song "O - Overdrive" peaked at #44 on the German singles chart."

=== Push Remix ===
"See You in the Next Life" (Push Remix) was made by renown New York-based Belgian trance and EDM producer Mike Dierickx (aka M.I.K.E. Push), who has also remixed and remixes for esteemed artists such as Armin Van Buuren, Moby, Sinead O Connor, Reinier Zonneveld.

=== Unofficial remixes ===
Unofficial remixes include:

- "See You in the Next Life" (Dj Terracto Remix) 7:13
- "See You in the Next Life" (Paul Denton's Acid Rework) 6:41
- "See You in the Next Life" (Val Kcalon Version) 6:31
- "See You in the Next Life" (DJ Valera Gil Remix) 4:07
- "See You in the Next Life" (Beetseekers Remix) 4:21
- "See You in the Next Life" (Beetseekers Remix) 4:07

== Compilations ==
=== 1999 ===
- Pete Tong / Fatboy Slim / Paul Oakenfold – Essential Millennium (London Records)
- DJ Geronimo – Trance Progressiv (Dezember 99) (DJ G. Switzerland)
- 15 Years Of Technoclub - The Anniversary Compilation (Dance Division Germany)
- DJ Orkidea* – Unity Mix Volume.8 (Unity Records, Finland)
- DJ Yanny – Energy Trance Vol. 7 (EDM Records, Germany)

=== 2000 ===
- Trancemaster 2004 (Vision Soundcarriers, Germany & Switzerland)
- Techno Traxx Part 4 (ZYX Music - Germany, Russia)
- DJ Dean DJ Networx Vol.5 (Tunnel Records/Sony Music, Germany)
- Techno Dröhnung (One Way Records, Germany, Austria, & Switzerland)
- Klubb Attack Vol. 03 (LTM Recordings, Germany, Austria, & Switzerland)

=== 2001 ===
- Dorian Gray - History Of Magic 2 (FFM Dance Department, Germany)
- High Energy (Sony, Netherlands)

=== 2003 ===
- Sunshine Live Classics (Toptrax Recordings, Germany)

=== 2024 ===
- DJ Connection 2 (Toptrax Recordings, Germany)

== Publishing ==
"See You in the Next Life" by Atlantis ITA and Ithaka is published by Ravenshark Music/North Music Group, BMG Gold Songs, and American Society of Composers, Authors and Publishers. The ISRC numbers for Original Mix are: GBDEC2100769.
