= Stars Over Foy =

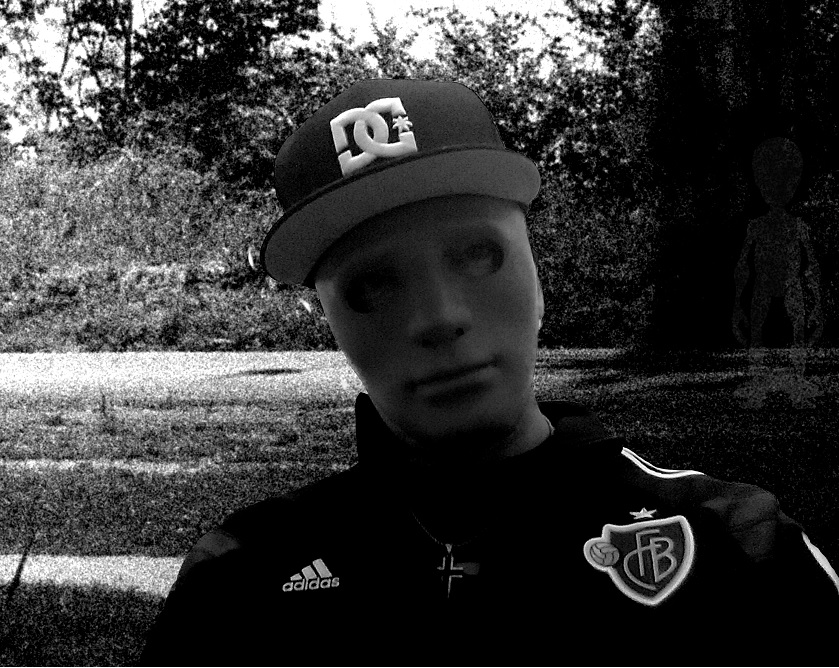

Background information
- Born: Jessy Winters; Roosendaal en Nispen, Netherlands
- Genres: Ambient, drone, soundtrack, space music
- Years active: 2015–present
- Labels: Planet Ambi, Ambient Files
- Website: starsoverfoy.com

Stars Over Foy is a Dutch ambient music producer and radio host with Australian descent, living in Belgium. He is also known as Lone Wolf in Space and Moon Visitor and the radio host of the World of Ambient show on Di.fm. 3 of his releases entered the World Chill Lounge Charts in April 2016 and many followed in the years after.

== History ==
Stars Over Foy was founded in 2015 to create relaxation, meditation and sleep music for the audio CD series World of Ambient by Swiss based radio station Planet Ambi HD Radio.

The first World of Ambient CD was released on 3 December 2015. Followed by World of Ambient Part II on 29 February 2016.

"Until We Meet Again In Heaven" and "Don't Run To The River" (both part of World of Ambient) and At The End Of The Ocean (part of World of Ambient Part II) charted in the World Chill Lounge Charts at the same time in week 16 of 2016.

Guiding Bells a track that he composed with Dr. J. James and released on Planet Ambi entered the WCC Charts on 2 May 2016 at #37.

In April 2016, he released "The Dreamship" a music CD with the focus on sleep.

In June, he released his CD album "Mirror of Emotions" and in September "Outrunning The Darkness" with his new Stars Over Foy presents Art of Drone project.

In September 2016, he launched his podcast named "World of Ambient Podcast" in where he plays a dj mix featuring drone and ambient music.

September 2017, he released a new CD album in the Planet Ambi Presents World of Ambient Part III series.

His radio show and podcast "World of Ambient" have been broadcast on Di.fm since October 2017.

His track Pacific taken from his album "World of Ambient Part III' reached the number 2 position of the World Chill Charts in week 52 of 2017.

In 2018, he released his first mix album "The Ambient Files" on his own new label "Ambient Files". For this album he works together with artists such as Bvdub, Vechigen, Hirotaka Shirotsubaki, Alonefold, and Blank Embrace.

He is the founder and owner of the ambient music label "Ambient Files" on which he mostly releases his own music.

== Discography ==
=== CD Albums ===
- 2015 – Planet Ambi Presents World Of Ambient (Music For Relaxation) (Planet Ambi)
- 2016 – Planet Ambi Presents World Of Ambient Part II (Music For Relaxation) (Planet Ambi)
- 2016 – The Dreamship (Music For Deep Sleep) (Planet Ambi)
- 2016 – Mirror Of Emotions (Planet Ambi)
- 2016 – Outrunning The Darkness (Planet Ambi)
- 2016 – Kurama (with Nagayaki Hushimo) (Planet Ambi)
- 2017 – Planet Ambi Presents World of Ambient Part III (Planet Ambi)
- 2018 – The Ambient Files mixed by Stars Over Foy (Ambient Files)
- 2019 – The Ambient Files, Part 2 mixed by Stars Over Foy (Ambient Files)
- 2019 - The Dreamship No. 2 (Music For Deep Sleep) (Planet Ambi)

=== Digital Singles ===
- 2016 – At The End Of The Ocean (Planet Ambi)
- 2016 – Guiding Bells (with Dr. J. James) (Planet Ambi)
- 2016 – Here For You (with Dr. J. James as S.O.F.) (Planet Ambi)
- 2016 – Until We Meet Again In Heaven (Vechigen Chillout Remix) (Planet Ambi)
- 2016 – Spring Garden (with Vienna Sky) (Planet Ambi)
- 2016 – 15 Minutes of Silence (Ambient Online)
- 2016 – Alien Takeover (Ambient Online)
- 2016 – Endless Flight Across The Sea Of Stars (Planet Ambi)
- 2017 – Never Look Back (Planet Ambi)
- 2017 – Moust à Ché (part of Ambient Movember MMXVII)
- 2018 – Pacific (Ambient Online)
- 2018 – Want To Leave This World (Into Space) (with Vechigen) (Ambient Files)
- 2018 – Atlantic / Pacific (Planet Ambi)
- 2019 – Vechigen - We Are You (Stars Over Foy Soundscapes Mix) (Divergent Industry)
- 2019 – Until Infinity (with vienna Sky) (Planet Ambi)
- 2019 – Empty Places (with Robert Woodfield) (Divergent Industry)
- 2019 – Mirror of Emotions (Ambi Nature Mix) (Planet Ambi)
- 2019 - Dreamscape (with Vienna Sky) (Planet Ambi)
- 2019 - Call 911 (with Vienna Sky) (Planet Ambi)
- 2019 - Alien On Pluto (Planet Ambi)
- 2019 - On The Edge of Alert (Planet Ambi)
- 2019 - Beyond The Mountains (Planet Ambi)
- 2020 - The Day She Disappeared (with Robert Woodfield) (Planet Ambi)
- 2020 - Ambient Skies (with Vienna Sky) (Planet Ambi)
- 2020 - Beauty of Silence (with Cold Winter) (Planet Ambi)
- 2020 - Proxima Centauri (Planet Ambi)
- 2020 - Discovery (with Vienna Sky) (Planet Ambi)
- 2020 - The Elevator Tapes (with Lowest Fidelity) (Planet Ambi)
- 2020 - Music For Dreams (with Vienna Sky) (Planet Ambi)
- 2020 - Frozen Lake Of Dreams (with Cold Winter) (Planet Ambi)
- 2020 - It's Never Too Late (with Vienna Sky) (Planet Ambi)
- 2020 - Godspeed (Planet Ambi)
- 2020 - Supernova (with Moon Visitor) (IBMA II)
- 2021 - I Am Divergent (Planet Ambi)
- 2021 - Distance Between (with Robert Woodfield and Cold Winter) (Planet Ambi)
- 2021 - Northern Lights (Planet Ambi)
- 2021 - Silent Sleep (with Calm Panda) (Planet Ambi)
- 2021 - Drifting Away (with Moon Visitor) (Ambient Files)
- 2021 - No More (with Art of Drone and We Don't Exist) (Ambi Dark)
- 2021 - Crying Stars (with Lone Wolf in Space) (Ambient Files)
- 2021 - Cygnus (with Hidden Fantasy) (Ambient Files)
- 2021 - Nova (with Vienna Sky) (Ambient Files)
- 2022 - Left Behind (with Lone Wolf in Space and Moon Visitor) (Ambient Files)
- 2022 - Key To Paradise (with Vienna Sky) (Ambient Files)
- 2022 - Safe Now (Ambient Files)
- 2022 - Supernova II (with Moon Visitor) (IBMA II)
- 2023 - Everything Changes (with Robert Woodfield and Cold Winter) (Ambient Files)
- 2023 - Nova, Part 2 (with Vienna Sky) (Ambient Files)
- 2023 - Etheric Drift (with Lone Wolf in Space) (Ambient Files)
- 2023 - Kilonova (with Moon Visitor) (Ambient Files)

== Discography Hit Quotation Singles ==
Single(s) with hit quotation in World Chill Lounge Charts (WCC)	Date release	Date entree	Highest position	Number of weeks	Notes
Until We Meet Again In Heaven	03-12-2015	04-04-2016	5	20	
Don't Run To The River	03-12-2015	18-04-2016	7	19	
At The End Of The Ocean	07-03-2016	18-04-2016	28	4	
Guiding Bells	16-03-2016	02-05-2016	14	9	with Dr. J. James
We Are Not From Earth	29-02-2016	13-06-2016	21	11	
Hypnotised By Aliens	29-02-2016	15-08-2016	9	22	
Mind Peace	30-05-2016	24-10-2016	10	15	with Dr. J. James as S.O.F.
Follow Your Heart	14-06-2016	24-10-2016	9	19	with Dr. J. James and Jamie Duvel
Lost in the Outback	03-12-2015	28-05-2016	15	38	
Mindfulness Trip	14-11-2016	20-02-2017	24	17	with Nagayaki Hushimo
15 Minutes of Silence	09-01-2017	10-05-2017	11	21	
Nagoya Moments	14-11-2016	17-05-2017	9	19	with Nagayaki Hushimo
Pacific	01-09-2017	02-10-2017	2	28	
Le Prix de la Loyauté	01-09-2017	09-10-2017	6	14	
Garden in the City	01-09-2017	01-01-2018	10	11	
Never Look Back	11-05-2017	08-01-2018	16	7	
Want To Leave This World (Into Space)	23-07-2018	13-08-2018	11	12	with Vechigen
The Ambient Files	23-07-2018	01-10-2018	10	14	
Atlantic	24-09-2018	14-12-2018	41	3	
Until Infinity	15-03-2019	22-04-2019	14	5	with Vienna Sky
Nova, Part 2	17-03-2023	19-05-2023	5	11	with Vienna Sky

== Trivia ==
- Stars Over Foy wears a mask or face cover during most live shows and on press photos.
- He is member of the Chill-out music group Vechigen that is signed to the famous Bonzai Music label from Belgium.
- Is an active skateboarder.
- Supports the Swiss football club FC Basel 1893 and Dutch team AZ Alkmaar.
- Owns a German Shepherd named Rex The Raptor with his own instagram account.
- Lives together with his girlfriend and dog in Belgium.
