= Limited Growth =

Limited Growth is a trance collaboration between Frederico Santini & Axel Stephenson. They had a total of eight releases in 1997 and 1998 under the label Bonzai Records. Their song No Fate reached number 2 in the Belgian charts in 1997.
