= Yves Deruyter =

Belgian DJ and artist

- Born: Yves Deruyter; 4 May 1970 (age 56); Antwerp, Belgium
- Genres: Trance, techno, hard trance
- Occupations: DJ, producer
- Years active: 1985-present
- Label: Bonzai Records
- Website: www.ydr.be

Yves Deruyter (born 4 May 1970) is a Belgian DJ and producer famous for his work on Bonzai Records.

== Career ==
Yves Deruyter started his DJ career in 1985 and has played in Belgian clubs such as Globe, Barocci, Cherrymoon, Extreme, Carat, BBC, and La Rocca. In 1991, he also started an artist career. Since then he has been signed to Bonzai Records. His first single "Animals" became a big club hit in Belgium. At this stage people started watching artists like Yves Deruyter for playing on big raves such as Mayday, Energy, Love Parade, Street Parade, Nature One, Trance Energy, Mystery Land, Inner City, Sensation Black, Dance Valley, Groundzero, Frequence, Decibel Outdoor, Defqon 1, Gatecrasher, I love Techno, Antwerp is Burning, City Parade, and Tomorrowland.

He started his artist career in 1991, when he signed a contract with Bonzai Records and released his first single, 'Animals'. His second single, 'Rave City', sold over 50,000 copies. His third single, 'Calling Earth', sold over 70,000 copies.

"A Story About House" was to be the next Cherrymoon Trax single, but due to problems with the club it was changed into a new Yves Deruyter single. His follow-up single, "The Rebel," became the international breakthrough for Yves Deruyter. He also released music such as "The House of House" and "In My Electric House" under the alias Cherrymoon Trax, named after the club he played in.

His most recent release was "Spiritual Feeling/Y.D.O.T.". His new single will be a re-release of "Spiritual Feeling", which will also include a "Dolphin remix". He made this remix together with L-Vee (Airwave).

Deruyter used to work with Frederico Santini and later Mike "M.I.K.E. Push" Dierickx (Push, The Blackmaster, Moon Project, etc.) who was one of the most important producers at Bonzai Records.

== Discography ==
=== Albums ===
- 1998 : Calling Earth Bonzai
- 1999 : D-Album Dmdorbit
- 2001 : Feel Free S&M S
- 2004 : Yves Deruyter 2001 INDEPENDANCE
- 2005 : Timeless Trance ZYX Music
- 2007 : D-Classics Bongiovanni

=== Singles ===
- 1992 : Animals Antler-Subway
- 1993 : Rave City Bonzai Records
- 1994 : Rave City Streetheat
- 1995 : Outsiders
- 1996 : Outsider: Remix Logic Records
- 1996 : Move Your Body Casseopaya
- 1997 : Calling Earth ''Netherlands'' Total Recall
- 1997 : The Rebel ''Bonzai'' Bonzai
- 1999 : Feel Free ''Belgium 12" Single'' Bonzai
- 1999 : Feel Free ''UK 12" Single'' Bonzai
- 1999 : Factory/Bass Mekaniks Dmdbonzai
- 2000 : Factor Y Dmdbonzai
- 2000 : Factor Y
- 2000 : To the Rhythm ''CD/12"'' Orbit
- 2000 : Back to Earth Polygram
- 2001 : Feel Fine ''US CD/12' Star Sixty Nine Records
- 2001 : Rhythmic Bazz
- 2002 : Music Non Stop
- 2004 : On the Move Phobos / ZYX Music
- 2005 : Born Slippy ZYX Music
- 2005 : Calling Earth ''Germany'' Phobos / ZYX Music
- 2005 : Calling Earth DMDTR
- 2005 : Infinity ZYX Music
- Remix EP Bonzai
