= Push-up (disambiguation) =

Push-up is a calisthenics exercise performed by raising and lowering the body using the arms.

Push-up may also refer to:

== Music ==
- "Push UP", a 2006 song by the German ensemble: the Warp Brothers
- "Push Up" (song), a 2004 song by the British ensemble: the Freestylers
- Push Up, an EP by the British ensemble: the Freestylers
- Push Up Records, a Germany-based record label and subsidiary of Tunnel Records
- "Push Ups" (song), a song by Canadian rapper Drake

== Other uses ==
- Push-Up, an ice cream brand owned by Nestlé
- Push up bra, a style of brassiere that augments the aesthetic appeal of the wearer's breasts with form-fitted lift and support
- Handstand push-up, a type of push-up exercise where the body is positioned in a handstand
