= Universal Nation =

Single by Push
- Released: 1998
- Recorded: 1997
- Genre: Trance
- Length: 10:15; 3:46 (radio edit)
- Label: Bonzai Records
- Songwriter: Mike "M.I.K.E." Dierickx

Push singles chronology
"Universal Nation" (1998)	"Cosmonautica" (1999)

"Universal Nation" is a song by Belgian DJ and producer Mike "M.I.K.E." Dierickx under his alias Push. What began as a small trance studio project in late 1997 became an international commercial success over the years. The song was first released in 1998 on the Belgian trance label Bonzai Records. After receiving positive reviews, the song was signed in France, Spain and Germany. One year later, other European countries followed (UK, Italy, Norway, Sweden, The Netherlands). Due to the several individual releases, the song has three different titles: Universal Nation, Universal Nation ’99 and Universal Nation (The Real Anthem). The track had its origins as a B-side to Dierickx's track "Prisma" and was named after the Love Parade in Berlin.

Mike Dierickx is generally praised for his high quality productions. Universal Nation is often quoted as an "all time favorite trance record". In 1999 Universal Nation won "Best club single Move-X Dance Awards".

== Background ==
Dierickx has released music under various aliases on multiple Belgian labels, including the renowned Bonzai Records. At the time, he had just completed a track titled "Prisma", intended to be the A-side of his upcoming release. In a 2018 interview with the YouTube channel Muzikxpress, he said that he had planned to create a B-side track to accompany "Prisma", which resulted in the initial composition of "Universal Nation", at that point untitled.

When the management at Bonzai Records heard the draft of the track, they were impressed and decided it should take centre stage as the lead track of the upcoming release. Dierickx recalled taking the finished B-side upstairs to the label's offices on a digital audio tape and being called back about an hour later, to find the staff dancing to it; they told him that it was not a B-side but "a real anthem", and that it should become a separate project. Asked to give the new project a name, he chose Push.

Recalling the production process, Dierickx said that he did not set out to write an anthem, and that he went into the studio without a plan: "when I go in the studio I never really think of, you know, I want to go to a certain direction ... I just go in the studio and what happens happens". He described the track as having been made on a Wednesday afternoon in about four hours, at a time when his working day ran from roughly one o'clock until six. He produced it using hardware, sequencing on an early version of Logic on a PC and using a Roland JP-8000 synthesiser, which had recently been released; he took one sound from the instrument for the bassline and another for the lead, and said that the JP-8000 "saved my life". He also recalled having no particular tracks in mind as inspiration for the composition.

Dierickx took the title from the Love Parade in Berlin, which he was due to attend a few weeks later; he recalled thinking of "lots of people coming together, one nation". The EP that carried the record was titled The Real Anthem, while its two tracks were "Universal Nation" and "Prisma"; the mismatch caused confusion at the time, and the song came to be widely referred to as "The Real Anthem" because of its success.

== Legacy ==
Universal Nation was followed by "Cosmonautica", "Legacy", "Please Save Me" (feat. Sunscreem) and "Strange World". All of them were extremely well received in the European clubscene. Today Universal Nation is regarded as a classic trance record. The phrase "proceed with visual attack formation" is sampled from the 1984 film The Last Starfighter.

By the time of the song's twentieth anniversary, in 2018, Dierickx said that he had no plans for a special re-release, remarking that "sometimes when a track is good, leave as is", although remixes were occasionally issued "under certain conditions". He recalled that the Belgian DJ Charlotte de Witte had begun playing the track at festivals, and that the two had discussed its use on Twitter, with de Witte describing it to him as one of her favourite festival tracks. In January 2024, de Witte released a rework of "Universal Nation" as the first release on Époque, an archival imprint of her label KNTXT. Reviewing it for Resident Advisor, Andrew Ryce wrote that the original "was written as a B-side, and sounds like it—the track takes its sweet time to get going", and called de Witte's version "expertly done".

In 2020, listeners of the Made in Belgium Top 100, a chart of the most iconic tracks in the history of Belgian dance music compiled by Tomorrowland's One World Radio, voted "Universal Nation" the number one Belgian dance track, ahead of Dimitri Vegas & Like Mike's "Mammoth" and Jones & Stephenson's "The First Rebirth".

== Track listing ==
1. Original Radio Mix (3:46)
2. DJ JamX & DeLeon's "DuMonde" Radio Mix (3:04)
3. Original Extended Mix I (10:15)
4. DJ JamX & DeLeon's "DuMonde" Remix (9:00)
5. Original Extended Mix II (7:57)

=== Charts ===
==== Original version ====
Chart (1999)	Peak Position
Belgium (Ultratop 50 Flanders)	28
Belgium (Ultratop 50 Wallonia)	29
France (SNEP)	53
Germany (GfK)	59
Scottish Singles Sales (Official Charts)	31
UK Singles (Official Charts)	36
Chart (2003)	Peak Position
Scottish Singles Sales (Official Charts)	52
UK Singles (Official Charts)	54

==== Universal Nation '99 ====
Chart (1999)	Peak Position
Scottish Singles Sales (Official Charts)	35
UK Singles (Official Charts)	35

== Trivia ==
- To celebrate the 10th anniversary the special mini album “Universal Voice E.P.” will be released. A 15 minutes preview is yet available on the official Myspace page.
- In 2007 Dutch jump-style duo Jeckyll & Hyde made a radio remix of “Universal Nation”.
- DJ Tiesto used the Club Illusion live recording of this song in his 1999 release Live at Innercity: Amsterdam RAI. The recording was then incorrectly labeled as "The Anthem".
