= Dino Lenny =

Italian DJ, singer and record producer

Dino Lenny (born Dino Anthony Lanni) is an Italian DJ, singer, record producer and record label owner (Frenetica), who has been active in the dance music scene for over 30 years.

== Career ==
Growing up playing in the biggest European clubs - Axis, Space, Amnesia, Goa, The Egg, Ministry of Sound – Lenny gained success thanks to remixes and collaborations with INXS, Planet Funk, Underworld, the Housemartins, Scissor Sisters and many others.

In 1999, as a member of the short-lived project Atlantis ITA, Dino Lenny and partner Michele Guidi released See You In The Next Life featuring Californian lyricist-vocalist Ithaka. The track was included in the soundtrack of the 2000 British thriller film Sorted directed by Alexander Jovy along with renowned musical acts such as; Leftfield, Morcheeba, Public Enemy, Elvis Presley and Depeche Mode.

The song was played during the closing titles sequence of the film, ending the entire film with Ithaka Darin Pappas' acapella line, "I'll See You In The Next Life". The song peaked at #93 on the UK Singles Charts in August of 2000. And re-charted a second time in May of 2001, climbing to #96.

After being among the “Essential New Tunes" of Pete Tong on BBC Radio 1, Lenny started singing in 2005. The British press defined his style as a mixture between Talking Heads and Ian Dury. Later on Lenny was invited by Hardage to take part in his project which included Jocelyn Brown, Maxi Priest, Level 42 and Peter Gabriel.

In 2007, Lenny released the single "Feels Like Home", together with Meck who took care of the production (with Simon Duffy) and the vocals. The track entered the Top 40 of the UK Singles Chart and was A-listed on BBC Radio One. The song was on the soundtrack for Wembley Stadium's opening event; the FA Cup final between Manchester United and Chelsea.

A few months later, Madonna used "Feels Like Home" in a mashup with "Like a Prayer", and performed the new version in 80 countries across the world within the Sticky & Sweet Tour in 2008/09, creating "Feels Like a Prayer".

== Current releases ==
Lenny remixed Missy Elliott and Timbaland's "Get Involved" for the Ministry Of Sound and "Static Revenger" for Toolroom, and will soon release his new album Music Is Killing Piracy which contains collaborations with Tiësto, Mark Knight, Benny Benassi, TV Rock, Francesco Farfa, Piatto, Meck, Jose Amnesia and his musical partner Simon Duffy.

== Partial discography ==
A partial discography can be found at Discogs and his own website.
