= Scot Project =

German hard trance DJ and record producer

DJ Scot Project
- Also known as: Arome, De Zenk, Dread Selector, Hypnosis, Kerosin, L'espace, The King of Trin, Lostsidon, Mike Feser, Tocs, Supermusique!
- Born: Frank Zenker; 29 May 1973 (age 53)
- Origin: Frankfurt, Germany
- Genres: Hard trance; Tech trance; Techno
- Occupations: Disc Jockey; Producer
- Instrument: Turntables
- Years active: 1990–present
- Labels: Overdose, Druck
- Website: www.scotproject.net

Frank Zenker (born 29 May 1973, Frankfurt, Germany), better known by his stage name Scot Project, is a German hard trance DJ and record producer. He also produces musical pieces under aliases such as "Arome" and "TOCS."

== Biography ==
Scot Project learned to mix techno at the age of 13, and he got his first break in 1986, playing break beat in a youth club in Frankfurt. During the 1990s, he became resident DJ of several clubs in and around Frankfurt.

Scot Project's success began in 1994, when his first track "X" was released; this was followed closely by "U (I Got A Feeling)," in 1995. The latter track peaked at #45 in the Swedish charts and at #66 in the UK Singles Chart. It was followed by the 1998 UK hit, "Y (How Deep is Your Love)" which made #57, also in the UK.

In 2001 Scot Project charted at #44 in the German singles chart with "O - Overdrive". In 2002, Frank Zenker and Kai Winter (Derb) created the Druck Records label. In 2004, Scot's track "L (Want Your Love)" took over from Eric Prydz's "Call On Me" at #1 in the Discomania sales chart.

In 2010, Scot Project received a genre Beatport Artist Award, and has had the honour of being supported by many legends in the world such as Tiësto, Ferry Corsten, Paul van Dyk, Armin van Buuren, Paul Oakenfold, Judge Jules, Yoji Biomehanika and many more.

== Discography ==
=== Studio albums ===
Year	Title	Label	Peak UK Vinyl Album Chart	Refs
2005	A1	Overdose	29	
2007	Techno Club, Vol. 22: Talla 2XLC vs. Scot Project	Technoclub		

=== Remixes ===
- 1999 Atlantis ITA ft. Ithaka - “See You In The Next Life” (DJ Scot Project Remix)
