= Vechigen (band) =

Dutch band

- Origin: Rotterdam, Netherlands
- Genres: Ambient, Chill Out, Soundtrack, Downtempo, Trance, Electronica, Experimental
- Years active: 2010–present
- Labels: Bonzai Music
- Members: Jessy Winters
- Past members: Kelly Frei
- Website: vechigenmusic.com

Vechigen is a Dutch musical project formed in 2010 in Switzerland, by Jessy Winters and Kelly Frei.

== History ==
The first single "Magic Frost" was released on October 29, 2010 with trance remixes by UK producer Paul Farrin.

In March 2011, a Vechigen remix was released on Club Nation Records of Matt Pincer - "The Catch". This remix got picked up by the Chilled Series compilation. In the same year Vechigen released remixes for artists such as Kamil Esten, Alexey Yakimov and got added to compilations like Trance Angels, Trance Trip, Wanderlust - Sixth Trip, From Goa With Love, Chill in Paradise, Goodbye 2011 and Best Of 2011 (both the Chill Out and Trance edition).

In November 2011, Vechigen released the collaboration project Do Not with Lisaya on Club Nation Records.

In 2012, Vechigen released remixes for artists such as Rex brandtner, Matt Pincer and featured on Farrinheit by Paul Farrin. Vechigen got added to several compilations

In the beginning of 2013, Vechigen gained the attention of the major Bonzai Music label from Belgium. With "What We Don't Know", "We Don't Change" and "Street Dreams" featured on compilations such as Hotel De Prestige, La Catharsis and Wanderlust. "We Don't Change" entered the Italian Dance Charts in March. In November, Bonzai Music released "Melbourne" both as "Vechigen - Melbourne" and "Jessy Winters - Melbourne" for unknown reasons.

2014 started with eight compilations and in May a new single "Tell No One" and two months later "Heart Of Croatia". This resulted in Vechigen getting added to another 14 compilations such as Calm Tunes, Essential Chill Out Tunes, Inner Silence and Island of Dreams. Also in 2014 they released a remix edition of their collaboration with Lisaya.

In 2015, Vechigen got added to over 20 compilations released in the same year, while only releasing two singles – "The Guest House" and "The V-Files".

"Alien Believer" and "The Visitors" (both part of The V-Files) charted in the World Chill Lounge Chart.

In November 2015 they released a cover of "Crockett's Theme" the Miami Vice theme song by Jan Hammer, called "Vice City". Their first release in 2016 was a remix of "Until We Meet Again in Heaven" by Stars Over Foy.

In 2018, they were part of "The Ambient Files", a mix CD project by Stars Over Foy.

== Discography ==
=== Singles ===
- "Magic Frost" (2010) Club Nation Records
- "Do Not" (2011) (with Lisaya) Club Nation Records
- "Unconfirmed Stories" (2012) (with Polar Motion) Mountain View
- "Keine Angst" (2012) Mountain View
- "Remixworld" (2012) Mountain View
- "I Miss You" / "Christmas Shooting Stars" (2012) Club Nation Records
- "What We Don't Know" (2013) Bonzai Music
- "Street Dreams" (2013) Bonzai Music
- "Melbourne" (2013) Bonzai Music
- "Tell No One" (2014) Bonzai Music
- "Heart Of Croatia" (2014) Bonzai Music
- "Do Not" (Remixes) (2014) (remixed by AudioRunners) Berlin Madness
- "The Guest House" (2015) Bonzai Music
- "The V-Files" (2015) Bonzai Music
- "Vice City" (2015) Bonzai Music
- Stars Over Foy - "Until We Meet Again in Heaven" (Vechigen Chillout Remix) (2016) Planet Ambi
- "Water Reflection" (2017) Planet Ambi
- "Want To Leave This World (Into Space)" (with Stars Over Foy) (2018) Planet Ambi
- "Vice City" (2018) Bonzai Back Catalog
- "The V-Files" (2018) Bonzai Back Catalog
- "The Guest House" (2018) Bonzai Back Catalog
