= Ace (Scooter album) =

Studio album by Scooter
- Released: 5 February 2016
- Recorded: 2015
- Studios: Sheffield Underground Studios (Hamburg, Germany)
- Genre: EDM
- Length: 48:35
- Labels: Sheffield Tunes, Kontor
- Producer: Scooter

Scooter chronology
The Fifth Chapter (2014)	Ace (2016)	Scooter Forever (2017)

Singles from Ace
- 1. "Riot" Released: 4 September 2015; 2. "Oi" Released: 5 February 2016; 3. "Mary Got No Lamb" Released: 6 May 2016

Professional ratings
Review scores
Source	Rating
Muzoic	4/5 stars
Random.Access	5/10

Ace is the eighteenth studio album by German band Scooter released on 5 February 2016 through Sheffield Tunes & Kontor Records, preceded by the first single "Riot" on 4 September 2015, and the second single "Oi" was released on 5 February 2016. They both peaked in Hungary at No.16 and 19 respectively. The third single "Mary Got No Lamb" was released on 6 May 2016.

== Track listing ==
No.	Title	Writer(s)	Length
1.	"Ace"	H.P. Baxxter; Phil Speiser; Michael Simon; Jens Thele	2:05
2.	"Oi"	Baxxter; Speiser; Simon; Thele	3:10
3.	"Mary Got No Lamb"	Ian George Sutherland	3:26
4.	"Riot"	Baxxter; Speiser; Simon; Thele; Tim Kesteloo; Michael Maidwell; Jacob Streefkerk; Michael Kurth; Jasmin Shakeri-Nejad	3:05
5.	"Encore" (featuring Jaap Reesema)	Baxxter; Speiser; Simon; Thele; Jaap Reesema; Jonas Zekkari	3:54
6.	"Burn" (Scooter and Vassy)	Baxxter; Speiser; Simon; Thele; Vasiliki Karagiorgos	2:40
7.	"Don't Break the Silence"	Baxxter; Speiser; Simon; Thele; Katerina Bramley; Janisz Konsztantinu	3:19
8.	"The Birdwatcher"	Dmitri Shostakovich	3:34
9.	"What You're Waiting For" (featuring Maidwell)	Baxxter; Speiser; Simon; Thele; Maidwell; Jacob Streefkerk; Eddy Steeneken; Tony Verdult; Michael Kurth	3:34
10.	"Crazy"	Baxxter; Speiser; Simon; Thele; Streefkerk; Maidwell; Steeneken; Verdult	3:04
11.	"Opium"	Baxxter; Speiser; Simon; Thele	3:57
12.	"Stargazer" (featuring Maidwell)	Baxxter; Speiser; Simon; Thele; Streefkerk; Verdult; Maidwell; Steeneken; Kurth	3:34
13.	"Wolga"	Baxxter; Speiser; Simon; Thele	6:05
14.	"Torch"	Marc Almond; Dave Ball	3:08

== Personnel ==
- H.P. Baxxter (MC aka Ace)
- Phil Speiser (musical bases, post-production)
- Michael Simon (co-author)
- Vasiliki Karagiorgos (track 6)
- Michael Maidwell (track 9 & 12)
- Martin Weiland (cover design)
- Jaap Reesema (track 5)

== Charts ==
Chart (2016)	Peak position
Austrian Albums (Ö3 Austria)	14
Czech Albums (ČNS IFPI)	11
German Albums (Offizielle Top 100)	6
Hungarian Albums (MAHASZ)	13
Swiss Albums (Schweizer Hitparade)	34
UK Dance Albums (Official Charts)	17

== Release history ==
Region	Date	Label	Format
Germany	5 February 2016	Sheffield Tunes	CD; LP; Digital download

== Notes ==
- "Mary Got No Lamb" contains lyrics from the 1976's song "Arms of Mary" by Sutherland Brothers and Quiver.
- "The Birdwatcher" is based on the melody of "The Second Waltz" ("Russian Waltz") by Dmitri Shostakovich and samples main melody from the track "Airport" by Photographer.
- "Torch" is Scooter's version of the 1982's eponymous song by Soft Cell.
- Czech/Slovak and Australian releases of the album by Universal Music and Central Station Records have special design with the titles "Scooter" and "Ace" written in pink letters on both Digipak and booklet.
