= See the Day (Hypetraxx song) =

2000 single by Hypertraxx

Single by Hypetraxx

from the album Tales from the Darkside
- Released: 2000
- Label: EMI

Hypetraxx singles chronology
"The Darkside" (1999)	"See the Day" (2000)	"Paranoid" (2001)

"See the Day" is a fifth single by German band Hypetraxx, which was released in 2000. The song peaked at number 24 on the German singles chart.

== Track listing ==
CD single
No.	Title	Length
1.	"See the Day (Video Mix)"	2:51
2.	"See the Day (Airplay Mix)"	2:57
3.	"See the Day (Sean Dexter Daylight Edit)"	5:22
4.	"See the Day (Extended Mix)"	8:14
5.	"See the Day (Edit)"	4:48
6.	"See the Day (Non Vocal)"	8:14
7.	"See the Day (Sean Dexter Daylight Remix)"	7:33

== Charts ==
Chart (2000–01)	Peak position
Austria (Ö3 Austria Top 40)	29
Germany (GfK)	24
Sweden (Sverigetopplistan)	44
Switzerland (Schweizer Hitparade)	84

== Release history ==
Date	Format	Label
5 September 2000	CD single	EMI
