= Tales from the Darkside (album) =

Studio album by Hypetraxx
- Released: 2000
- Label: Flex Records
- Producer: Sean Dexter

Singles from Calling Time
- 1. "The Darkside" Released: 1999; 2. "See the Day" Released: 2000

Tales from the Darkside is an album by German band Hypetraxx, released in 2000. The album peaked at No.50 on the Swedish albums chart.

== Track listing ==
CD
No.	Title	Length
1.	"Tale 1"	1:01
2.	"The Darkside"	6:23
3.	"Hope"	5:49
4.	"The World is Mine"	5:53
5.	"Tale 2"	1:04
6.	"See the Day"	5:05
7.	"Nightvisions"	3:37
8.	"Free Yourself"	5:47
9.	"Disappearance"	4:24
10.	"Judgement Day"	5:19
11.	"Tale 3"	1:02
12.	"The Law"	5:58
13.	"Flatline"	0:35
14.	"Access Denied"	3:59
15.	"Illusions & Lies"	3:42
16.	"Dreamworld"	7:33

== Charts ==
Chart (2001)	Peak position
Swedish Albums (Sverigetopplistan)	50

== Release history ==
Region	Year	Format	Label
Denmark	2000	CD	Flex Records
