= Gary D. =

Gerald Malke
- Also known as: Azimuth; Bazztard; Daywalker; Dub Daddy; Gerald Malke; Kinetic Crew
- Born: 5 December 1963
- Origin: Germany
- Died: 1 September 2016 (aged 52)
- Genres: Trance, hard trance, acid, techno, hardstyle
- Occupations: Producer, DJ
- Years active: 1980–2016
- Labels: D.Traxx, Tunnel Records, Bonzai Records
- Website: http://www.garyd.de/

Gerald Malke (5 December 1963 – 1 September 2016), known professionally as Gary D, was a German trance/hardstyle producer and DJ, known for the trance compilations D.Trance.

== Career ==
=== Early career ===
Gary D. started out playing as a DJ at the age of 16 in 1980. In his first years, he mostly played Black Music. It wasn't until 1988 when Gary D. started to get more involved with electronic such as, Techno and House, which in the same year he released his first single "Ecstasy" under alias "Acid Syndrome". As a DJ, Gary D. performed often at a club in Hamburg called 'Unit Club' from 1988 up until its closure in 1994. He later moved to another club called 'Tunnel'.

=== As a trance producer and DJ ===
In 1991, Gary D. released his first trance EP, "Identity E.P." with five singles on it, which was released on Container Records, the label on which he released many singles before switching to Tunnel & Bonzai Records. Under Bonzai, Gary released the two hard trance singles "Kinetic Pressure" and "Overload".

In late 1995, he and two others from PIAS Recordings Germany came up with an idea to create a trance compilation, which came out to be "D.Trance", which grew into a big success. Gary D. released more than 40 D.Trance compilations as of 2009. Gary added a third disc, which compiled all the tracks from the first discs into one mix. From 1996 to 2016, he also released five solo albums. In 2000, he created "D. Techno" a harder style compilation.

=== Shift to hardstyle ===
In 2001, Gary took a different direction with his career, and started to release more techno, and adopted hardstyle kind of music to his DJ sets. From 2003 to 2005 he played in many gigs in the Netherlands and played in large venues with up to 25,000 people.

=== Death ===
He died from pulmonary embolism.

== Discography ==
=== Albums ===
- WORKS, 1995, CONTAINER RECORDS, GARY D. PROJECT SAMPLER
- BANG!, 1997, DJ`S PRESENT
- D.SIGNALS, 1999, DJ`S PRESENT
- STRIKE!!!, 2001, DJ`S PRESENT
- FOUR, 2004, EDM

=== 12" singles ===
- IDENTITTY E.P., 1991, CONTAINER RECORDS
- 93 E.P., 1993, CONTAINER RECORDS
- OH JA BITTE, 1993, CONTAINER RECORDS
- SLAMMIN`, 1994, CONTAINER RECORDS
- SLAMMIN`(REMIXES), 1994, CONTAINER RECORDS
- ANAL INTRUDER E.P., 1994, RADIKAL RECORDS – US RELEASE
- LOVE IS AN OCEAN, 1995, CONTAINER RECORDS PROMO ONLY RELEASE
- ANAL INTRUDER, 1995, EVOLVER RECORDS
- ICE MACHINE HEAD, 1995, EVOLVER RECORDS
- KINETIC PRESSURE, 1996, BONZAI RECORDS, BELGIUM
- TIMEWARP, 1996, BONZAI RECORDS, BELGIUM
- D.TRANCE ANTHEM, 1996, DJ`S PRESENT
- CAN`T DO WITHOUT IT, 1997, DJ`S PRESENT
- TAKE CONTROL, 1997, DJ`S PRESENT
- PARADISE E.P., 1997, BIT MUSIC, SPAIN
- DONNERGOTT, 1999, DJ`S PRESENT
- STEP FORWARD, 1999, DJ`S PRESENT
- DIE HERDPLATTE 2000°, 2000, DJ`S PRESENT
- SPRINGWORLD 2001, 2000, DJ`S PRESENT
- MY HOUZZE, 2001, DJ`S PRESENT
- ELEVATE YOUR MIND, 2002, DJ`S PRESENT
- D.TRANCE ANTHEM 2002, 2002, DJ`S PRESENT
- B.A.S.S. KICK DOWN, 2003, EDM
- RAISE YOUR HANDS, 2004, EDM
- FOUR IZ THE NUMBER, 2004, EDM
- STUPID MUTHAFUCKAZ, 2006, DTRAXX RECORDINGS
- GOOD SHIT, 2007, DTRAXX RECORDINGS
- HARDSTYLEBASS, 2007, DTRAXX RECORDINGS
- HIGHER STATE OF HAPPINESS, 2008, TUNNEL RECORDS
