= Tunnel Records =

Record label

Tunnel Records is a record label founded by DJ Dean, and based in Hamburg, Germany. Tunnel Records was home to artists and groups such as X-Dream, DJ Dean, Gollum + Hunter, DJ Yanny, Accuface, Wrong Plane, DJ Shane, DJ Shoko, Waveliner, DJ Krid-Kid, Dj C-Bass & DJ Merlin, Ziggy X, Patrick Bunton, and Gary D.

Since 1997, Tunnel has produced Tunnel Trance Force compilation CDs based on the current "sound of the Tunnel", which refers to music played in the club 'Tunnel', also owned by Tunnel Records and located in Hamburg. Tunnel Records also publishes a number of other trance compilations such as Time Tunnel, Tunnel goes Ibiza, DJ Networx, and Best of Tunnel.

Tunnel Records has two sublabels: Push Up Records and Red Light. Under the latter were released six editions of Tunnel Red Light, techno mixes on CD, from 1996 to 1999.

== Release history ==
Tunnel Trance Force release history:

| Number | Year | Mix CD1 | Mix CD2 |
|---|---|---|---|
| 01 | 1997 | Cosmix | Planet mix |
| 02 | 1997 | Venus mix | Mars mix |
| 03 | 1997 | Space mix | Orbit mix |
| 04 | 1998 | Saturn mix | Jupiter mix |
| 05 | 1998 | Moonmix | Sunmix |
| 06 | 1998 | Cyber mix | Shuttle mix |
| 07 | 1998 | Gold mix | Diamond mix |
| 08 | 1999 | Light mix | Dark mix |
| 09 | 1999 | Lovemix | Flowermix |
| 10 | 1999 | Watermix | Summermix |
| 11 | 1999 | Milenium mix | Armageddon mix |
| 12 | 2000 | Alpha mix | Omega mix |
| 13 | 2000 | Cool Side mix | Fresh side mix |
| 14 | 2000 | Moon mix | Saturn mix |
| 15 | 2000 | Xmas mix | Sylvester mix |
| 16 | 2001 | Odyssee 2001 mix | Lost in time mix |
| 17 | 2001 | Sunshine mix | Refreshing mix |
| 18 | 2001 | ISDN mix | DSL mix |
| 19 | 2001 | Winter mix | Snow mix |
| 20 | 2002 | Celebration mix | Ceremony mix |
| 21 | 2002 | Cool waters mix | Hot nights mix |
| 22 | 2002 | Hands up mix | Jump around mix |
| 23 | 2002 | Frozen mix | Ice mix |
| 24 | 2003 | Deep blue mix | Silver acid mix |
| 25 | 2003 | Purple power mix | Yellow party mix |
| 26 | 2003 | Green Grass Mix | Yellow Dust Mix |
| 27 | 2003 | Red Nose Mix | White Snow Mix |
| 28 | 2004 | Black Velvet Mix | White Pearls Mix |
| 29 | 2004 | Sunrise Mix | Sunset Mix |
| 30 | 2004 | 30.1 Mix | 30.2 Mix |
| 31 | 2004 | 31.1 Mix | 31.2 Mix |
| 32 | 2005 | Outa Space Mix | Inner Flame Mix |
| 33 | 2005 | Skywalker Mix | Darth Vader Mix |
| 34 | 2005 | Barbarez Mix | Van Der Vaart Mix |
| 35 | 2005 | Cruise Mix | Flight Mix |
| 36 | 2006 | Miami Mix | Orlando Mix |
| 37 | 2006 | Saturn Mix | Venus Mix |
| 38 | 2006 | Wild Romance Mix | Space Trigger Mix |
| 39 | 2006 | Red Apple Mix | Black Pearl Mix |
| 40 | 2007 | Black Attack Mix | Silver Liquid Mix |
| 41 | 2007 | Summer Rain Mix | Summer Sky Mix |
| 42 | 2007 | Time Tunnel Mix | Time Travel Mix |
| 43 | 2007 | Free Kick Mix | Hat Trick Mix |
| 44 | 2008 | Summer Rain Mix | Summer Sky Mix |
| 45 | 2008 | Terminator Mix | Schwarzenegger Mix |
| 46 | 2008 | Burning Fire Mix | Blue Space Mix |
| 47 | 2008 | Purple Haze Mix | White Widow Mix |
| 48 | 2009 | Black Attack Mix | Blue Magic Mix |
| 49 | 2009 | Magic Enlightenment Mix | Ultimate Knowledge Mix |
| 50 | 2009 | Epic Freedom Mix | Million Miles Away Mix |
| 51 | 2009 | X-Mas Shock Mix | Sylvester Crash Mix |
| 52 | 2010 | Yellow Dust Mix | Black Power Mix |
| 53 | 2010 | Kick Off Mix | Finale Mix |
| 54 | 2010 | Green Stuff Mix | White Rabbit Mix |
| 55 | 2010 | Burning Red Mix | Black Heat Mix |
| 56 | 2011 | Deep Blue Mix | White Line Mix |
| 57 | 2011 | Purple Haze Mix | White Widow Mix |
| 58 | 2011 | Speed Racer Mix | Stock Car Mix |
| 59 | 2011 | Dark Night Mix | Red Light Mix |
| 60 | 2012 | Green Poison Mix | White Rabbit Mix |
| 61 | 2012 | Hot Lava Mix | Cool Ice Mix |
| 62 | 2012 | Blue Sky Mix | White Sand Mix |
| 63 | 2012 | Purple Hills Mix | Violet Night Mix |
| 64 | 2013 | Red Rumble Mix | Black Booze Mix |
| 65 | 2013 | Marine Squad Mix | White Raven Mix |
| 66 | 2013 | Sunrise Mix | White Raven Mix |
| 67 | 2013 | Red Light Mix | Black Knight Mix |
| 68 | 2014 | Tunnel Tank Mix | Night Attack Mix |
| 69 | 2014 | Summer Trance Mix | After Beach Mix |
| 70 | 2014 | Golden Age Mix | Platin Future Mix |
| 71 | 2014 | Red Hot Mix | Cool White Mix |

== See also ==
- List of record labels
