= Oi (Scooter song) =

2016 single

Single by Scooter

from the album Ace
- Released: February 5, 2016
- Recorded: 2015-2016
- Studio: Sheffield Underground Studios
- Genre: Melbourne bounce
- Length: 3:15
- Label: Sheffield Tunes
- Songwriters: H.P. Baxxter; Michael Simon; Phil Speiser; Jens Thiele
- Producer: Scooter

Scooter singles chronology
"Riot" (2015)	"Oi" (2016)	"Mary Got No Lamb" (2016)

"Oi" is a song by German hard dance band Scooter. It was released on February 5 2016, it was released the day before they released their eighteenth studio album Ace as the second single.

== Track listing ==
=== Download ===
1. "Oi" — 3:10
2. "Oi (Extended Mix)" — 4:03

== Notes ==
- The song samples the 2013 song Ode to Oi by American disc jockey TJR.
- The song was also sampled in the 2018 single OI F #KIN OI by Code Black and Toneshifterz.

== Chart performance ==
Chart performance for Oi
Chart (2016)	Peak position
Hungary (MAHASZ)	19
