= Wrong Plane =

Dutch producers/DJ formation

- Origin: Rotterdam, South Holland, Netherlands
- Genres: Hands Up, hard trance, trance, electro house
- Years active: 2012–present
- Labels: Tunnel Records, Berlin Madness
- Members: Jessy Winters (2012-present); Alan Frijns (2012-2020); Tezija Zararić (2012-2014)
- Website: www.wrongplane.com

Wrong Plane is a Dutch producers/DJ formation mainly creating electro house, hard trance and Hands Up music.

The act was initially a trio, later continuing with producers Alan Frijns and Jessy Winters (JEZZI), who serves as the frontman during live performances.

Their first single "Primera Linea" was released on August 20, 2012, and directly added to DJ Dean's CD compilation Tunnel Trance Force and gained airplay on major radio stations in Germany like Sunshine Live.

The follow-up single "Raumschiff" (a cover of Major Tom by Peter Schilling was released in May 2013 on the Hamburger label Tunnel Records. Raumschiff was added to CD compilations such as Tunnel Trance Force and DJ Networx and remixed by the famous German DJ Dean.

On November 12, 2013, Wrong Plane released its third single "Liebe" on Berlin Madness, which was directly added again to a Tunnel Trance Force CD compilation and got into the German airplay charts (WDC50).

On September 8, 2014, their single "Coming Home" entered the British Dance Charts at #24.

== Discography ==
- Primera Linea (2012)
- Raumschiff (2013)
- Liebe (2013)
- Airwalkers (2014)
- Coming Home (2014)
- We Love You (2014)
- The Reaper (Romeo & Juliet) (2015)

== Discography Hit Quotation Singles International ==
Single(s) with hit quotation in Switzerland Swiss Dance Charts	Date release	Date entree	Highest position	Number of weeks	Notes
The Reaper (Romeo & Juliet)	15-05-2015	03-08-2015	98	1	

Single(s) with hit quotation in UK British Dance Charts	Date release	Date entree	Highest position	Number of weeks	Notes
Coming Home	23-07-2014	08-09-2014	6	10	The BDC30 refreshes after being listed for 10 weeks

Single(s) with hit quotation in DE WDC50	Date release	Date entree	Highest position	Number of weeks	Notes
Airwalkers	24-03-2014	10-04-2014	16	10	
Liebe	12-11-2013	23-01-2014	20	10	

Single(s) with hit quotation in Spain Megadance Top 50	Date release	Date entree	Highest position	Number of weeks	Notes
Airwalkers	24-03-2014	07-05-2014	15	11	
