= Bora! Bora! Bora! =

Single by Scooter

from the album Scooter Forever
- Released: 26 May 2017
- Recorded: 2017
- Length: 3:13
- Label: Sheffield Tunes (Germany)
- Songwriter(s): Michele Chieregato; Roberto Turatti; Fiorenzo Zanotti; Thomas Beecher Hooker; H.P. Baxxter; Phil Speiser; Michael Simon; Jens Thele
- Producer(s): Scooter

Scooter singles chronology
"Mary Got No Lamb" (2016)	"Bora! Bora! Bora!" (2017)	"My Gabber" (2017)

Music video
- "Bora! Bora! Bora!" on YouTube

"Bora! Bora! Bora!" is a single by German hard dance band Scooter. It was released on 26 May 2017 as the first single from their nineteenth studio album Scooter Forever. The song samples Scooter's own song "The United Vibe" from their 2007 album The Ultimate Aural Orgasm.

== Track listing ==
CD single (2-track) / Download

1. "Bora! Bora! Bora!" – 3:13
2. "Bora! Bora! Bora!" (Extended Mix) – 4:00

== Charts ==
Chart performance for "Bora! Bora! Bora!"
Chart (2017)	Peak position
Finland Downloads (Suomen virallinen latauslista)	16
Hungary (MAHASZ)	7
Russia Airplay (Tophit)	131
