= Push Up Records =

German record label

Push Up Records is a sublabel of Germany-based Tunnel Records. Under its flag were released almost only 12-inch singles, from 1999 to 2003.
