= DJ Dean =

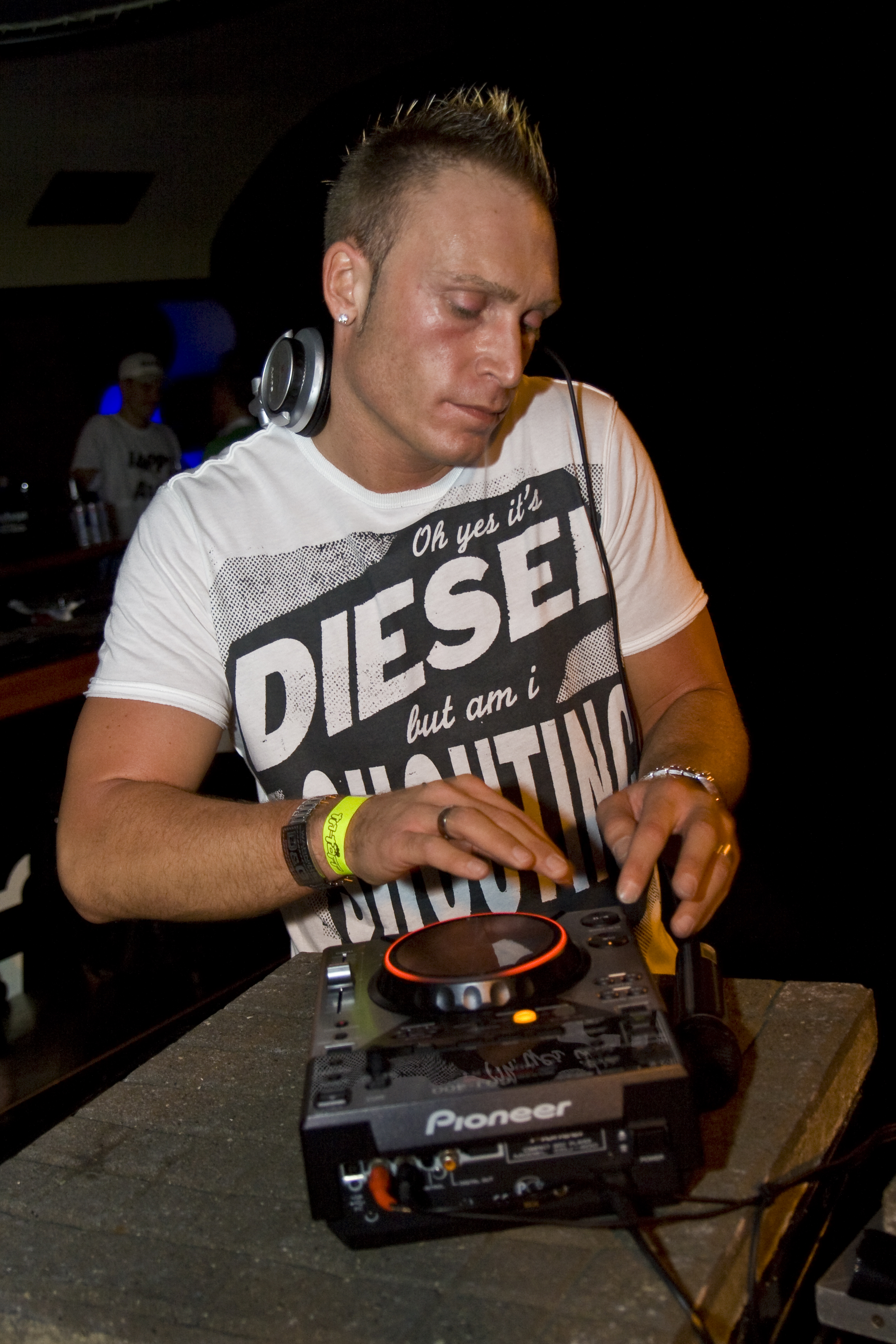
- DJ Dean live at Techno4ever.net

Background information
- Birth name: Martin Schmidt
- Also known as: Angel Beats, Barbarez, Balla Nation, Bettnasser, Energy Flash, The Fall, Impegement Syndrom, Martin Schmidt, Marty Schmidt, Martynes, Power Play, Silver Liquid, Star Burst, Treibbeat, Van Nilson
- Born: October 25, 1976 (age 48)
- Origin: Hamburg, Germany
- Genres: Techno, trance
- Occupation: Disc jockey
- Instrument: Turntables
- Years active: 1992–present
- Labels: Sony Music Entertainment; Tunnel Records
- Website: http://www.djdean.de

DJ Dean (born as Martin Schmidt October 25, 1976 in Hamburg, Germany) is a German Euro-trance/hard trance DJ, producer, and current longtime resident DJ of the Tunnel dance club in Hamburg. He is also the founder of the German trance label Tunnel Records, which has released successful trance/hard trance compilations under the Tunnel Trance Force and DJ Networx franchises.

== Biography ==
DJ Dean's career began in 1992, when he worked in Hamburg's club scene with the music styles Hardcore and Gabba. After playing at Time Tunnel Rave in 1995, he became resident DJ of the club Tunnel, based in Hamburg.

In 1997, DJ Dean set up his own studio. There he produced his first project in co-operation with Sony Music Media (a division of Sony Music Entertainment), a mix called Tunnel Trance Force. This mix was the first of 46 Tunnel Trance Force compilations over more than a decade. He followed this with his third solo-album, Protect Your Ears, appearing under the Tunnel Records Label.

His Trance Club Tunnel achieved top 10 status in the Media Control Charts. Other releases were the maxi-vinyls Protect Your Ears, Play It Hard, It's a Dream, and Ballanation. Other projects, in different styles of music, he has worked in; Das Licht, Angel Beats, Barbarez, Dynamic, D's, Sylver Liquid, Impegement Syndrom, and Van Nilson.

== Selected discography ==
=== Singles ===
- Darkness (1997)
- Friday Night (1997)
- House Nation (1997)
- It's True (1997)
- Energy (1998)
- Trust Me (1998)
- Looking So Good (1999)
- What's Wrong (1999)
- Ballanation (2000)
- Balla Nation Episode 2 (2002)
- Play It Hard (2002)
- Protect Your Ears (2003)
- Ballanation 2004 (2004)
- It's A Dream (2004)
- It's A Dream / Planet Earth (2004)
- Ballanation No.4 (2005)
- Music Is My Life (2005)
- If I Could Be You (2006)
- Kick Da Bass (2006)
- Kick Off (2006)
- Music Is My Life (2006)
- Dreamworld (2007)
- Euphoria (2007)
- Going Nowhere (2008)
- Powersystem (2008)
- Nobody Ever Knows Any More (with DJ Space Raven) (2010)

=== Remix ===
- Trance Force (1997)
- Abmarsch (1997)
- Another Dimension (1997)
- I Know You're Out There (1998)
- Living In A Dream (1998)
- Let There Be Light (1998)
- The Access Of Trance (1998)
- Kiss (1999)
- Take Off! (1999)
- The Temple Of House (1999)
- Nevermore (2000)
- What's Up? (2001)
- Let Your Mind Fly (2001)
- Loose My Mind (2001)
- Deine Welt (2002)
- Don't Cry (2002)
- Into Your Eyes (2002)
- Ready For This? (2002)
- The Frequency (2002)
- Energizer 2002 (2002)
- Sky Is The Limit (2002)
- I Lose My Mind (2003)
- Das Omen (2003)
- Hardhouz Generation (2003)
- Taste Of Summer (2003)
- You Make My Dreams (2004)
- What's Up (2004)
- All Her Fears (2005)
- Born To Dance (2005)
- Love U More (2005)
- Por Que No (2005)
- Tranceformation (2005)
- All Her Fears (2005)
- Traveller (2005)
- The Fear (2005)
- Traum (2006)
- Stand Up! (2006)
- Angels Fly (2007)
- Hungry Animal (2007)
- Rock The Bass (2008)
- Trancemission (2008)
- Sunrise (2008)
- Laurent's Song (2008)
- Flug Auf Dem Glücksdrachen (2008)
- This Beat Is What You Need (2009)
- Wrong Plane - Raumschiff (DJ Dean Remix) (2013)

=== Albums ===
- Balla Nation The First Album (2000)
- Balla Nation Episode 2 (2002)
- Protect Your Ears (2003)
- Eye Of A Champ (2006)
- The Projects (2008)
- Double Trouble (2011)
- Home (2020)

=== EPs ===
- Deluxe E.P. (2001)
- Dean Project's E.P. (2006)
- Club Analysis E.P. (2007)
- Eye Of Champ E.P. (2007)
- The Projects E.P (2008)
