= Atlantis ITA =

Italian trance music group

- Origin: Rome, Italy
- Genres: Trance, hard trance, acid trance
- Years active: 1999–2003
- Labels: Infusion (UK), Overdose (Germany), Intercord (Germany), Biotex (Italy), Jams (UK)
- Past members: Alessandro Foietta, Dino Lenny, Marco Capelli

Atlantis ITA was a trance music group from Rome, Italy consisting of Alessandro Foietta, Dino Lenny and Marco Capelli. The project released only four songs together; "See You In The Next Life” featuring Ithaka (1999), "The Good Land" (2002), "The Elektrofunk" (2011) and "The Man I'd Die For" (2021).

Their debut track, the 1999 acid trance song "See You in the Next Life" featuring Ithaka, was released by Overdose Records in Germany and Infusion Records in the UK.

After being included on 1999's "Essential Millennium" compilation compiled by Pete Tong, Fatboy Slim and Paul Oakenfold (released by London Recordings), Atlantis ITA's "See You in the Next Life" featuring Ithaka, peaked in the No. 91 position on the UK Singles Chart in August 2000.

Also in 2000, "See You in the Next Life" appeared during the closing titles sequence of the British feature film Sorted, directed by Alexander Jovy and starring Matthew Rhys, Sienna Guillory, Ben Moor and Tim Curry.

The online platform Record Days describes Atlantis ITA as, a rising star in the indie dance scene, blending ethereal melodies with introspective lyrics, evoking emotions that linger long after the last note fades.

== Discography ==
- 1999 "See You in the Next Life" featuring Ithaka
- 2002 "The Good Land"
- 2011 "The Elecktro Funk"
- 2021 "The Man I'd Die for"
