= The Darkside (song) =

Single by Hypetraxx

from the album Tales from the Darkside
- Released: 1999
- Genre: Trance
- Label: EMI

Hypetraxx singles chronology
"Interceptor" (1999)	"The Darkside" (1999)	"See the Day" (2000)

"The Darkside" is a fourth single by German band Hypetraxx, released in 1999. The song peaked at number 4 on the Norwegian singles chart.

== Track listing ==
CD single
No.	Title	Length
1.	"The Darkside (Video Cut)"	2:57
2.	"The Darkside (Original Mix)"	8:03
3.	"The Darkside (Sean Dexter Rmx)"	7:00
4.	"The Darkside (DJ Mix)"	9:31
5.	"The Darkside (7pm Mix)"	6:28
6.	"The Darkside (7pm Cut)"	4:28
7.	"The Darkside (Non Vocal)"	8:04

== Charts ==
=== Weekly charts ===
Chart (2000)	Peak position
Austria (Ö3 Austria Top 40)	8
Germany (GfK)	12
Norway (VG-lista)	4
Sweden (Sverigetopplistan)	46
Switzerland (Schweizer Hitparade)	67

=== Year-end charts ===
Chart (2000)	Position
Germany (Official German Charts)	81

== Certifications ==
Region	Certification	Certified units/sales
Denmark (IFPI Danmark)	Platinum	8,000^{^}
^{^} Shipments figures based on certification alone.

== Release history ==
Date	Format	Label
17 March 2000	CD single	EMI
