= Hypetraxx =

German band

- Origin: Germany
- Genres: electronic music
- Years active: 1996–2004
- Members: Cengiz Özmaden, Frank Kuchinke, Jesse B. Foerster

Hypetraxx is a German band composed of Cengiz Özmaden, Frank Kuchinke and Jesse B. Foerster.

== Discography ==
=== Studio albums ===
Year	Album details
2000	Tales from the Darkside: Released: 2000; Label: Flex Records; Format: CD

=== Singles ===
==== As lead artist ====
Year	Title	Peak chart positions					Album
Year	Title	GER	AUT	SWI	SWE	NOR	Album
1996	"Do U Love Me?"	—	—	—	—	—	—
1996	"Whop Your Body"	—	—	—	—	—	—
1999	"Interceptor" (D-Cay)	—	—	—	—	—	—
1999	"The Darkside"	12	8	67	46	4	Tales from the Darkside
2000	"See the Day"	24	29	84	44	—	Tales from the Darkside
2001	"Paranoid"	61	—	—	—	—	—
2002	"Send Me an Angel"	—	—	—	—	—	—
2003	"Ich bin so" (vs. Sabrina Setlur)	—	—	—	—	—	—
2003	"The Promiseland"	—	—	—	—	—	—
2004	"Dead or Alive"	—	—	—	—	—	—
"—" denotes single that did not chart or was not released.

==== As featured artist ====
Year	Title
1997	"Wind It Up!" (Egoist)
