= Endless Flight =

Endless Flight may refer to:

- Endless Flight (album), a 1976 album by Leo Sayer
- Endless Flight: The Life of Joseph Roth, a 2022 biographical book by Keiron Pim
