= Mike Dierickx =

Belgian DJ & producer (born 1973)

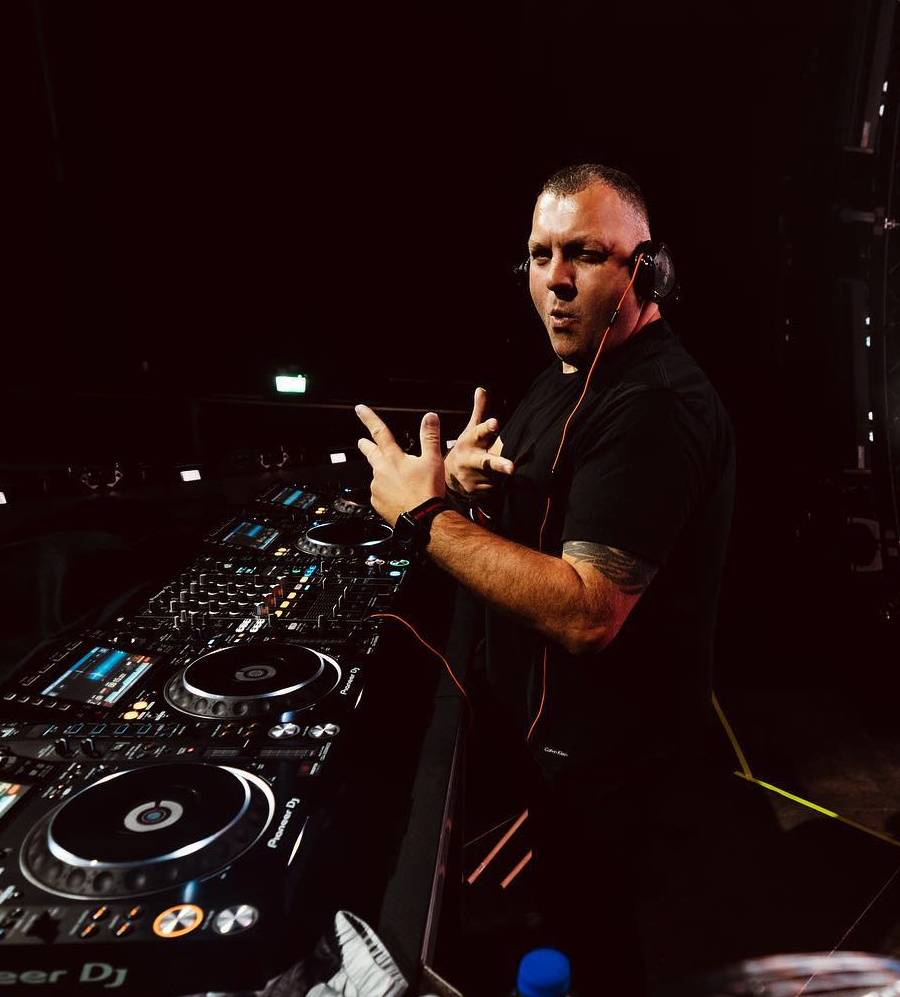

Background information
- Also known as: Push, M.I.K.E. Push, Solar Factor, The Blackmaster, Return of the Native, Plastic Boy, Retro-Active ..
- Born: Dirk Dierickx, name change to Mike Dierickx in 2000; 20 February 1973 (age 53); Antwerp, Belgium
- Genres: House, techno, trance
- Occupations: Producer, DJ, remixer, songwriter
- Instruments: Keyboards, synthesizer, drum programming
- Years active: 1992–present
- Labels: Filth on Acid, FSOE, Armada Music, Bonzai Records, Push Forward
- Website: www.mikepush.com

Mike Dierickx (born Dirk Dierickx on 20 February 1973), most commonly recognized under the aliases Push or M.I.K.E. Push, is a Belgian DJ and producer. Best known for the song "Universal Nation", he has also released other club singles including "The Legacy" and "Strange World". His style is primarily trance and darker [retro] techno.

== Biography ==
Producing and DJing under the name M.I.K.E. Push, he has been releasing records under the guises: Solar Factor, M.I.K.E, The Blackmaster, Return of the Native, Plastic Boy and Push. In total, he has used over 85 different aliases throughout his career. As a DJ, Mike's style is similar to the music he produces, mostly progressive trance.

As an 11-year-old boy, he discovered the potential of samplers and keyboards, with his interest in electronic music developed further over the next years. At the age of 18, Mike handed his first demo tape to the Antwerp-based record company, USA Import. Shortly after, his first record, "Vision Act" was released through the Atom label in 1992. Mike released a series of records before he signed up with Lightning Records (Bonzai) in 1996.

Push became well-known and in 1998, Universal Nation won several dance awards, including a platinum award for selling over 25.000 vinyl units & Spotify streaming award, and is recognized as one of the classic dance-records of the trance era. His Push follow-up single "Strange World" was also a hit and played throughout hundreds of clubs all across Europe. This was followed by another release, "The Legacy", once again topping most dance charts across Europe and entering the British National charts at #22. Over the years, Mike received several music awards including best club singles and best dance-producer, France Media award, and entered the national Top 40 in the UK six times.

Mike also teamed up and produced remixes for Sinéad O'Connor, Moby, Armin Van Buuren, Bomfunk MC's, Ayumi Hamasaki, Bloodhound Gang, and Dimitri Vegas & Like Mike.

Since 2000, Push has spawned nine studio albums including: From Beyond, Electric Eclipse, Global Age, Together We Rule The World, Neon Life, Scope and his most recent release Known Universe, released July 2, 2026.

== Discography ==
=== As Push ===
==== Albums ====
- 2000 From Beyond (Bonzai Records)
- 2002 Strange World Japan Edition (Avex Records)
- 2004 Electric Eclipse (Bonzai Records)
- 2009 Global Age (Armada Music)
- 2018 Together We Rule The World (Mostiko)
- 2020 From Beyond Album Sampler E.P. (Bonzai Classics)
- 2020 Neon Life (Push Forward)
- 2022 Scope (Push Forward)
- 2026 Known Universe (Black Hole Recordings)

==== Singles ====
- 1994 "Acid Hysteria"
- 1995 "Da Story"
- 1995 "Blast Traxx"
- 1998 "The Real Anthem" (also released as "Universal Nation")
- 1999 "Cosmonautica"
- 1999 "Till We Meet Again"
- 1999 "Universal Nation '99"
- 2000 "Strange World"
- 2001 "The Legacy"
- 2001 "Please Save Me" (vs. Sunscreem)
- 2002 "Tranzy State of Mind"
- 2002 "Strange World / The Legacy"
- 2002 "Dreams from Above" (vs Globe)
- 2003 "Universal Nation 2003"
- 2003 "Tranceformation" (vs Globe)
- 2003 "Journey of Life"
- 2004 "Electric Eclipse"
- 2004 "R.E.S.P.E.C.T."
- 2008 "Dream Designer"
- 2008 "Universal Voice"
- 2008 "This Place" (feat. Sir Adrian)
- 2009 "Interference"
- 2009 "Infinite / Free Time"
- 2009 "Global Age"
- 2009 "Tomorrow Is Another Day" (vs Klems)
- 2018 "Together We Rule the World"
- 2019 "No Borders"
- 2020 "In the Sphere" (vs Crashguard)
- 2021 "Remind"
- 2022 "Big Things Have Small Beginnings" (Mark Sherry meets Push)
- 2022 "Straight to the Point / Mind Hype"

=== As Plastic Boy ===
==== Albums ====
- 2005 It's a Plastic World (Bonzai Records)
- 2011 Plastic Infusion (Armada Music)

==== Singles ====
- 1998 "Twixt"
- 1998 "Life Isn't Easy"
- 1999 "Angel Dust"
- 2000 "Can You Feel It"
- 2001 "Silver Bath"
- 2003 "Live Another Life"
- 2004 "Twixt 2004"
- 2005 "From Here to Nowhere"
- 2008 "Rise Up" / "A New Life"
- 2010 "Chocolate Infusion" / "Exposed"
- 2010 "Aquarius" / "Journey of a Man" / "We're Back To Stay"
- 2011 "RED E.P"
- 2016 "Now & Forever"

=== As Absolute ===
==== Albums ====
- 2008 Horizons (Armada Digital)

==== Singles ====
- 2000 "Stereosex"
- 2004 "New Horizon"
- 2005 "Day Dream"
- 2005 "Seven Sins / X-Factor"
- 2006 "Now & Ever"
- 2007 "Dream Odyssey / Up in the Air"
- 2008 "Absolute-Ly / Dolphin's Cry"
- 2008 "Sky High / Winter Time"

=== As M.I.K.E. and later on M.I.K.E. Push ===
==== Albums ====
- 2005 Armada Presents: Antwerp '05 (Armada Music)
- 2006 The Perfect Blend (Armada Music)
- 2007 Moving on in Life (Armada Music)
- 2013 World Citizen (ID&T – High Contrast Recordings)

==== Singles ====
- 1999 "Futurism"
- 2000 "Sunrise at Palamos"
- 2001 "The Running Night"
- 2002 "Ice Cream" (vs John '00' Fleming)
- 2003 "Turn Out The lights"
- 2004 "Totally Fascinated"
- 2004 "Intruder" / "Pound" (vs. Armin)
- 2004 "Dame Blanche" (vs John '00' Fleming)
- 2005 "Massive Motion"
- 2005 "Fuego Caliente"
- 2006 "Voices From The Inside"
- 2006 "Salvation"
- 2006 "Strange World 2006"
- 2006 "Into The Danger"(with Andrew Bennet)
- 2007 "Changes 'R Good"
- 2008 "Nu Senstation"
- 2008 "A Better World" (with Andrew Bennet)
- 2010 "Art of love"
- 2011 "Back in Time"
- 2012 "Coleurs Du Soleil" (with Maor Levi)
- 2013 "Elements of Nature" (vs Rank 1)
- 2013 "Canvas"
- 2014 "Astrolab"
- 2015 "Zenith" (vs Rank 1)
- 2016 "Quadrant"
- 2016 "Chiffon"
- 2016 "Pretention"
- 2016 "Circa"
- 2016 "Estivate"
- 2016 "Night Shades"
- 2017: "Sonorous" [Who's Afraid of 138?!]
- 2018 "Freysa" (as Cosmo Kid)
- 2019 "Somewhere Out There" (as Cosmo Kid)

=== As Solar Factor ===
- 2001 "Deep Sonar"
- 2002 "No Return"
- 2002 "Urban Shakedown"
- 2004 "Fashion Slam"
- 2005 "Global Getaways"
- 2005 "The Rising Sun"

=== As Project M.C. ===
- 2010 "Kontrol" / "Crossing the Sun"

=== As Retro Active ===
- 2020 "Here Once Again" vs. DJ Ghost [Generation Smash]
- 2022 "Dusk Till Darkness / Dark Motion [Techburst Records]
- 2022 "Blacked Out" [Bonzai Records]

=== As Ahead ===
- 2006 "3gether / Back To Reality" [A State Of Trance]

=== As Atractiva ===
- 2006 "Alba Nueva" [Pocket]

=== As Calling The Freak ===
- 1999 "Noise Shaping" [Scanner]
- 2000 "Shadows" [Scanner]
- 2000 "Display" [Scanner]
- 2000 "Rhythm Your Life" [Scanner]
- 2002 "Suck My Soul" [Scanner]
- 2003 "Your Time Is Up" [Scanner]
- 2004 Calling The Freak / Liquid Overdose - "Wild Life / Ecology / Ancient Space" [Scanner]

=== Singles chart positions ===
Year	Single		Peak chart positions				Album
Year	Project name	Title	UK	Belgium	Netherlands	Germany	Album
1998	Push	"Universal Nation"	36	28	—	59	From Beyond
1998	Plastic Boy	"Twixt"	94	—	—	—	It's a Plastic World
1999	Push	"Till We Meet Again"	46	—	—	—	From Beyond
1999	Push	"Universal Nation '99"	35	—	—	—	From Beyond
2000	Push						From Beyond
2000	Push	"Strange World"	21	—	—	—	From Beyond
2001	Push	"The Legacy"	22	—	—	—	From Beyond
2001	Push	"Please Save Me" (vs. Sunscreem)	36	—	57	—	Single only
2002	Push	"Tranzy State of Mind"	31	—	—	—	From Beyond
2002	Push	"Strange World/The Legacy"	55	—	—	—	From Beyond
2002	Plastic Boy	"Silver Bath"	88	—	—	—	It's a Plastic World
2002	M.I.K.E. (vs. John '00' Flemming)	"Icecream"	96	—	—	—	Single only
2003	Push	"Universal Nation 2003"	54	—	—	—	Singles only
2003	Push	"Transformation" (vs. Globe)	92	—	—	—	Singles only
2003	Push	"Journey of Life"	86	—	—	—	Electric Eclipse
2003	Plastic Boy	"Live Another Life" (feat. Rozalla)	55	—	—	—	It's a Plastic World
2004	M.I.K.E. (vs. Armin)	"Intruder" / "Pound"	144	—	—	—	The Perfect Blend
"—" denotes releases that did not chart

=== Remixes ===
- Atlantis ITA ft. Ithaka - “See You In The Next Life” (Push Remix)
- Art of Trance: "Madagascar" (Push Remix)
- Cygnus X: "The Orange Theme" (Push Remix)
- Mauro Picotto: "Back To Cali" (Push Remix)
- Moby: "In This World" (Push Vocal Mix)
- Rio Klein: "Fearless" (Push Remix)
- Sinéad O'Connor: "Troy – Phoenix From The Flame" (Push Remix)
- Sunscreem: "Exodus" (Push Remix)
- The Space Brothers: "Everywhere I Go" (Push Trancendental Remix)
- Yves DeRuyter: "Music Non Stop" (Push Remix)
- Robert Gitelman: "Things 2 Say" (M.I.K.E. Remix)
- The Gift: "Love Angel" (M.I.K.E. Remix)
- Armin Van Buuren: "In And Out of Love" (Push Trancedental Remix)
- Arnej: "They Always Come Back" (M.I.K.E. Remix)
- Ramirez Vs. Nebula: "Hablando" (Push Remix)
- Ayumi Hamasaki: "Boys & Girls" (Push Remix)
- Ayumi Hamasaki: "Carols" (Push Remix)
- Psy'Aviah: "Ok" (M.I.K.E. Remix)
- Lange: "Kilimanjaro" (M.I.K.E. Remix)
- Bloodhound Gang: "Clean Up in Aisle Sexy" (M.I.K.E. Push Remix)
- Dimitri Vegas & Like Mike vs. Diplo feat Deb's Daughter: "Hey Baby" (M.I.K.E Push Remix)
- Cherrymoon Trax – "The House of House" (M.I.K.E. Push Remix)
