= Bonzai Records =

Belgian record label

- Parent company: Banshee Worx (2003-present); Lightning Records (1992-2003)
- Founded: 1992
- Founder: Christian Pieters
- Distributor: Bonzai Digital Network
- Genre: Electronic
- Country of origin: Belgium
- Official website: www.bonzaiprogressive.com

Bonzai Records, also known as Bonzai Music or Bonzai Progressive, is a Belgium-based record label specializing in techno, trance, hard trance, Goa trance, rave music and hardcore music.

It was formed by DJ Fly in the back of record-shop The Blitz in Belgium in 1992 as a sublabel to Lightning Records, which went bankrupt in March 2003 and was subsequently replaced by the Banshee Worx label. Since its renewal in 2003, the label has released records under "Bonzai Progressive", however the 'Bonzai Records' catalog numbering continues.

== Sublabels ==
List of other current/former sublabels under the Bonzai name.

- Bonzai Club Grooves (2008)
- Bonzai Elemental (2006)
- Bonzai Records Digital (2006-2006)
- Bonzai Fiesta (2005)
- Bonzai Urban (2004)
- Bonzai Backcatalogue (2003–2005)
- UK Bonzai Gold Series (2001–2002), sublabel of 'UK Bonzai'
- UK Bonzai (2000), successor to 'Bonzai Records UK'
- Bonzai Trance Progressive UK (1999–2002)
- Bonzai Germany/Bonzai Trance Germany (1998–2000), run by 'Music Research' company.
- Bonzai Records UK (1998–2000)
- Bonzai Limited (1997)
- Bonzai Classics (1996)
- Bonzai Records Italy/Bonzai Trance Progressive Italy 1996-2003
- Bonzai Jumps Italy (1996–1998), subdivision of Arsenic Sound
- Bonzai Groove (1996-1996)
- Bonzai Trance Progressive (1995)
- Bonzai Jumps (1994–1998)

== Notable artists ==
- Frederico Santini (Peter Schiettekatte)
- Push
- Vechigen
- Limited Growth (Frederico Santini & Axel Stephenson)
- Yves Deruyter
- Jones & Stephenson (Frank Sels & Axel Stephenson)
- DJ Dave Davis
