= Jones & Stephenson =

Belgian music duo

Jones & Stephenson is a Belgian music duo mainly focusing on harder styles of electronic dance music. It has mostly consisted of Franky Jones, whose real name is Frank Sels, and Axel Stephenson, whose real name is David Brants.

In 1993 they made the classic hardcore techno/hard trance record The First Rebirth, released on Bonzai Records. The titular song is considered one of the foundations of the Dutch gabber/hardcore music genre.

The duo then released more singles: The Second Rebirth (1994), The Third Rebirth (1995), The Fourth Rebirth (1995) and Da Grooveinaltrancentalphunk EP (1996), but none have reached the fame of the first song.

When The First Rebirth was re-released in 2002 it reached the number 1 spot in the Belgian dance charts.

In 2019, Frank Sels together with Rob Fabrie (alias DJ Waxweazle) released the new single The Sixth Rebirth.
