= Sorted (film) =

2000 British thriller film

- German film poster
- Directed by: Alexander Jovy
- Screenplay by: Nick Villiers; Christian Spurrier; Malcolm Campbell
- Story by: Alexander Jovy
- Produced by: Fabrizio Chiesa
- Starring: Matthew Rhys; Sienna Guillory; Fay Masterson; Tim Curry
- Cinematography: Mike Southon
- Edited by: Justin Krish
- Music by: Guy Farley
- Distributed by: Prism Studios
- Release dates: 23 June 2000 (Munich Film Festival); 6 October 2000 (United Kingdom)
- Running time: 98 minutes
- Country: United Kingdom
- Language: English
- Budget: $9 million

Sorted is a 2000 British thriller film directed by Alexander Jovy and starring Matthew Rhys, Sienna Guillory, Fay Masterson, and Tim Curry. It also marked Kelly Brook's film debut.

== Plot ==
Carl has travelled to London to clear up the details of his brother's death. He finds that there is another side to his brother's life. A group of all-night ravers accept him into their family, as the brother of their late friend. Carl is then drawn into their world in order to discover the truth about his brother's suspicious death.

== Cast ==
- Matthew Rhys as Carl
- Sienna Guillory as Sunny
- Fay Masterson as Tiffany
- Tim Curry as Damian
- Jason Donovan as Martin
- Ben Moor as Thames Barrier Officer
- Kelly Brook as Sarah
- Colin McFarlane as Doctor
- Gina Murray as Jo

== Reception ==
Empire magazine gave the film three stars, calling it "...stylishly filmed, solidly plotted and, in Rhys and Guillory, offers an appealing central couple. All of which, coupled with a refreshing lack of reliance on gangster stereotypes and firearms, makes this one of the more palatable British thrillers of late".

The BBC also gives the film three stars but warns, "Jovy is so keen on giving us a snapshot of club culture (which comes across as startlingly real) that he lets go of his well-wounded plot and so the mid-section becomes a long flat stretch, punctured only by a few entertaining bits and bobs."

== Music ==
The film's modern musical soundtrack includes songs by: Leftfield, Morcheeba, Public Enemy, Elvis Presley, Matt Darey, Southsugar, The Turtles, Mauro Picotto, Paul Johnson, Aphrodite, Agnelli & Nelson, Funky G, Gibson Brothers, St. Etienne, Kadda Cherif Hadria, Disposable Disco Dubs, Six Degrees, Da Hool, Highgate, Art of Trance, Scott 4, Depeche Mode, Twisted Pair, Lost Tribe and CRW.

During the closing titles sequence of the film, a trance remix of Ithaka's 1992 vocal-poem song "So Get Up" was shown (remixed by Italian DJs, Atlantis) ending the entire film with Ithaka Darin Pappas' a cappella line, "I'll See You in the Next Life".
