= Londonbeat discography =

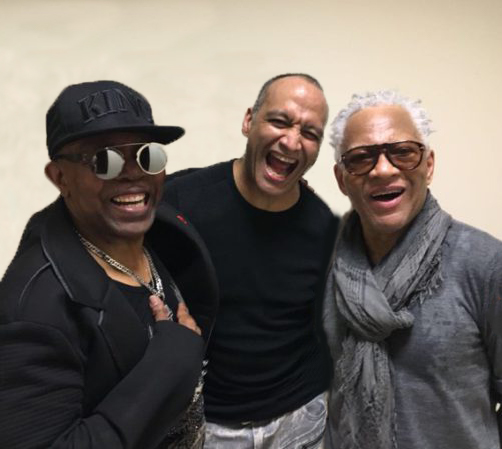
- Londonbeat in 2018
- Studio albums: 6
- Compilation albums: 8
- Singles: 33
- Remix albums: 1
- Other singles: 2

This article is the discography of the British dance-pop band Londonbeat and includes all their studio albums, compilations, their only remix album, and singles, as well as the peak chart positions for the United States, Australia, Germany, Ireland, Netherlands, New Zealand, Sweden, Switzerland, and United Kingdom.

== Albums ==
=== Studio albums ===
Title	Album details	Peak chart positions								Certifications
Title	Album details	US	AUS	GER	NL	NZ	SWE	SWZ	UK	Certifications
Speak	Release date: 26 September 1988; Label: Anxious (No U.S. release)	—	—	—	—	—	—	—	—	
In the Blood	Release date: 29 September 1990; Label: Anxious/Radioactive	21	12	15	11	17	5	5	34	ARIA: Gold; BPI: Silver
Harmony	Release date: 7 September 1992; Label: Anxious (No U.S. release)	—	181	24	15	—	27	27	—	
Londonbeat	Release date: 3 November 1994; Label: Anxious/Radioactive	—	94	—	—	—	—	—	—	
Back in the Hi-Life	Release date: 25 November 2003; Label: BMG (No U.S. release)	—	—	—	—	—	—	—	—	
Gravity	Release date: 4 October 2004; Label: Coconut (No U.S. release)	—	—	—	—	—	—	—	—	
"—" denotes releases that did not chart

=== Compilations ===
Title	Album details	Peak chart positions
Title	Album details	NL
Best! The Singles	Release date: 20 November 1995; Label: Anxious (No U.S. release)	45
The Very Best of Londonbeat	Release date: 1997; Label: Camden (No U.S. release)	—
Legends	Release date: 13 September 2004; Label: BMG (No U.S. release)	—
Hit Collection, Vol. 1	Release date: 10 January 2005; Label: Coconut (No U.S. release)	—
Greatest Hits	Release date: 3 September 2007; Label: Neo (No U.S. release)	—
Best Songs	Release date: 2011; Label: Монолит	—
I've Been Thinking About You Remixes	Release date: 2019; Label: Coconut	—
30 Years	Release date: 2019; Label: Coconut	—
"—" denotes releases that did not chart

=== Other albums ===
Title	Album details
Best Remixes	Release date: 23 October 1991; Label: Alex (No U.S. release)
The Crossing	Eumir Deodato feat. various artists; Release date: 2011; Label: Soul Trade

== Singles ==
Year	Title	Peak chart positions									Album/Collection
Year	Title	US	AUS	GER	IRE	NL	NZ	SWE	SWZ	UK	Album/Collection
1988	"Killer Drop / One Blink / Beat Patrol"	—	—	—	—	—	—	—	—	—	Speak
1988	"There's a Beat Going On"	—	—	—	—	19	35	—	—	88	Speak
1988	"9 A.M. (The Comfort Zone)"	—	—	—	—	33	—	—	—	19	Speak
1988	"Failing in Love Again"	—	—	—	—	11	—	—	—	60	Speak
1988	"There's a House Going On"	—	—	—	—	—	—	—	—	—	Speak
1989	"It Takes Two Baby"	—	—	—	—	—	—	—	—	42	Non-album single
1990	"I've Been Thinking About You"	1	1	1	9	1	5	1	1	2	In the Blood
1990	"A Better Love"	18	25	13	—	14	33	—	12	52	In the Blood
1990	"It's in the Blood"	—	—	—	—	—	—	—	—	—	In the Blood
1991	"No Woman, No Cry"	—	109	23	—	14	41	—	—	64	In the Blood
1991	"This Is Your Life"	—	—	—	—	26	—	—	—	—	In the Blood
1991	"A Better Love" (Umberto mix)	—	—	—	11	—	—	—	—	23	In the Blood
1992	"You Bring on the Sun"	—	135	6	—	5	—	9	14	32	Harmony
1992	"That's How I Feel About You"	—	—	52	—	—	—	—	—	69	Harmony
1992	"Lover You Send Me Colours"	—	157	33	—	26	—	40	—	—	Harmony
1994	"Come Back"	62	14	50	—	—	—	—	—	69	Londonbeat
1994	"You Make Me Do Things"	—	—	—	—	—	—	—	—	—	Londonbeat
1995	"I'm Just Your Puppet on a ... (String!)"	—	—	—	—	—	—	—	—	55	Non-album single
1995	"Build It with Love"	—	—	64	—	—	—	—	—	—	Londonbeat
1995	"9 A.M." (re-issue)	—	—	—	—	—	—	—	—	—	Londonbeat
1999	"I've Been Thinking About You" (Team 33 RMX)	—	—	—	—	—	—	—	—	—	New Londonbeat
1999	"Read Between Your Eyes"	—	—	—	—	—	—	—	—	—	New Londonbeat
2003	"Where Are U"	—	—	54	—	—	—	—	—	—	Back in the Hi-Life
2004	"The Air"	—	—	—	—	—	—	—	—	—	Back in the Hi-Life
2004	"Heaven"	—	—	—	—	—	—	—	—	—	Gravity
2004	"Busker McGee"	—	—	—	—	—	—	—	—	—	Gravity
2004	"I've Been Thinking About You" (with Damae)	—	—	—	—	—	—	—	—	—	Non-album singles
2009	"Where Are You" (with Indigo)	—	—	—	—	—	—	—	—	—	Non-album singles
2010	"I've Been Thinking About You 2010" (with Silver Screen)	—	—	—	—	—	—	—	—	—	Non-album singles
2010	"I've Been Thinking About You" (with David Vendetta)	—	—	—	—	—	—	—	—	—	Non-album singles
2018	"I've Been Thinking About You" (with Traumton)	—	—	—	—	—	—	—	—	—	Non-album singles
2019	"I've Been Thinking About You" (Klaas remix)	—	1	1	—	—	—	—	—	—	30 Years
2019	"You Bring on the Sun" (Charming Horses remix)	—	—	—	—	—	—	—	—	—	30 Years
2019	"You Bring on the Sun" (Jaydom RMX)	—	—	—	—	—	—	—	—	—	30 Years
2019	"Summer" (Klaas remix)	—	—	—	—	—	—	—	—	—	30 Years
"—" denotes releases that did not chart

== New Londonbeat singles ==
- "Eve of the Millenium" (1997)
- "Read Between Your Eyes" (1999)
- "I've Been Thinking About You" (1999)
