= List of Billboard number-one dance songs of 2019 =

Billboard magazine compiled the top-performing dance songs in the United States during 2019 on the Hot Dance/Electronic Songs, the Dance Club Songs, and the Dance/Mix Show Airplay. The oldest dance music chart, the Dance Club Songs was first published in 1976, ranking the most popular songs on dance club based on reports from a national sample of club DJs. The Dance/Mix Show Airplay was launched in 2003, ranking songs based on airplay detections on dance radio, as well as mix-show plays on top 40 radio and select rhythmic radio as measured by Mediabase. Premiered on January 26, 2013, the Hot Dance/Electronic Songs is a multi-metric chart ranking songs based on streaming, sales, and airplay audience impressions from radio stations of all formats.

== Chart history ==
Key
†	Indicates top-performing dance song of 2019.

Chart history
Issue date	Hot Dance/Electronic Songs			Dance Club Songs			Dance/Mix Show Airplay		
Issue date	Song	Artist(s)	Ref.	Song	Artist(s)	Ref.	Song	Artist(s)	Ref.
January 5	"Happier" †	Marshmello and Bastille		"Polaroid"	Jonas Blue, Liam Payne and Lennon Stella		"Happier"†	Marshmello and Bastille	
January 12	"Happier" †	Marshmello and Bastille		"Thank U, Next"	Ariana Grande		"Happier"†	Marshmello and Bastille	
January 19	"Happier" †	Marshmello and Bastille		"Praise You (2018)"	Fatboy Slim		"Happier"†	Marshmello and Bastille	
January 26	"Happier" †	Marshmello and Bastille		"Self Control"	Kendra Erika		"Happier"†	Marshmello and Bastille	
February 2	"Happier" †	Marshmello and Bastille		"Sweet but Psycho"	Ava Max		"Happier"†	Marshmello and Bastille	
February 9	"Happier" †	Marshmello and Bastille		"Nothing Breaks Like a Heart"	Mark Ronson featuring Miley Cyrus		"High Hopes"	Panic! at the Disco	
February 16	"Happier" †	Marshmello and Bastille		"I Don't Need Your Love"	Bleona		"High Hopes"	Panic! at the Disco	
February 23	"Happier" †	Marshmello and Bastille		"Remember"	Gryffin and Zohara		"High Hopes"	Panic! at the Disco	
March 2	"Happier" †	Marshmello and Bastille		"So Close"	NOTD and Felix Jaehn featuring Georgia Ku and Captain Cuts		"So Close"	NOTD and Felix Jaehn featuring Captain Cuts and Georgia Ku	
March 9	"Happier" †	Marshmello and Bastille		"This Feeling"	IYES and Ryan Riback		"Without Me"	Halsey	
March 16	"Happier" †	Marshmello and Bastille		"Heat"	Kelly Clarkson		"Without Me"	Halsey	
March 23	"Happier" †	Marshmello and Bastille		"7 Rings"	Ariana Grande		"Without Me"	Halsey	
March 30	"Happier" †	Marshmello and Bastille		"Giant"	Calvin Harris and Rag'n'Bone Man		"Without Me"	Halsey	
April 6	"Happier" †	Marshmello and Bastille		"Gam Gam"	DJs from Mars		"Without Me"	Halsey	
April 13	"Happier" †	Marshmello and Bastille		"The Boss 2019"	Diana Ross		"So Close"	NOTD and Felix Jaehn featuring Captain Cuts and Georgia Ku	
April 20	"Happier" †	Marshmello and Bastille		"Sue Me"	Sabrina Carpenter		"Sucker"	Jonas Brothers	
April 27	"Happier" †	Marshmello and Bastille		"You're Sorry"	Todd Edwards		"Sucker"	Jonas Brothers	
May 4	"Happier" †	Marshmello and Bastille		"Break Up with Your Girlfriend, I'm Bored"	Ariana Grande		"Here with Me"	Marshmello featuring Chvrches	
May 11	"Happier" †	Marshmello and Bastille		"Fire in My Soul"	Oliver Heldens featuring Shungudzo		"Sucker"	Jonas Brothers	
May 18	"Happier" †	Marshmello and Bastille		"Put Your Phone Down (Low)"	Jack Back		"Sucker"	Jonas Brothers	
May 25	"Happier" †	Marshmello and Bastille		"Piece of Your Heart"	Meduza featuring Goodboys		"Old Town Road"	Lil Nas X featuring Billy Ray Cyrus	
June 1	"Happier" †	Marshmello and Bastille		"Back to Life"	Hilary Roberts		"SOS"	Avicii featuring Aloe Blacc	
June 8	"Happier" †	Marshmello and Bastille		"Concrete Heart"	Vassy and Disco Fries		"Sucker"	Jonas Brothers	
June 15	"Happier" †	Marshmello and Bastille		"Walk Me Home"	Pink		"Old Town Road"	Lil Nas X featuring Billy Ray Cyrus	
June 22	"Happier" †	Marshmello and Bastille		"Give You Up"	Dido		"Old Town Road"	Lil Nas X featuring Billy Ray Cyrus	
June 29	"Happier" †	Marshmello and Bastille		"Medellín"	Madonna and Maluma		"Old Town Road"	Lil Nas X featuring Billy Ray Cyrus	
July 6	"Happier" †	Marshmello and Bastille		"SOS"	Avicii featuring Aloe Blacc		"All Day and Night"	Jax Jones and Martin Solveig (presents Europa) featuring Madison Beer	
July 13	"Happier" †	Marshmello and Bastille		"I've Been Thinking About You"	Klaas and Londonbeat		"Stay (Don't Go Away)"	David Guetta featuring Raye	
July 20	"Happier" †	Marshmello and Bastille		"Medicine"	Jennifer Lopez and French Montana		"All Day and Night"	Jax Jones and Martin Solveig (presents Europa) featuring Madison Beer	
July 27	"Happier" †	Marshmello and Bastille		"Selfish"	Dimitri Vegas & Like Mike and Era Istrefi		"Heaven"	Avicii	
August 3	"Happier" †	Marshmello and Bastille		"Stay (Don't Go Away)"	David Guetta featuring Raye		"I Don't Care"	Ed Sheeran and Justin Bieber	
August 10	"Happier" †	Marshmello and Bastille		"You Little Beauty"	Fisher		"I Don't Care"	Ed Sheeran and Justin Bieber	
August 17	"Happier" †	Marshmello and Bastille		"Go Slow"	Gorgon City & Kaskade featuring Romeo		"I Don't Care"	Ed Sheeran and Justin Bieber	
August 24	"Happier" †	Marshmello and Bastille		"Higher Love"	Kygo and Whitney Houston		"So Cold"	Mahalo and DLMT featuring Lily Denning	
August 31	"Happier" †	Marshmello and Bastille		"I Rise"	Madonna		"Who's Got Your Love"	Cheat Codes featuring Daniel Blume	
September 7	"Happier" †	Marshmello and Bastille		"Love Yourself"	Billy Porter		"Truth Hurts"	Lizzo	
September 14	"Happier" †	Marshmello and Bastille		"If You Love Somebody Set Them Free 2019"	Sting		"Truth Hurts"	Lizzo	
September 21	"Happier" †	Marshmello and Bastille		"Never Really Over"	Katy Perry		"Truth Hurts"	Lizzo	
September 28	"Happier" †	Marshmello and Bastille		"Can We Pretend"	Pink featuring Cash Cash		"Truth Hurts"	Lizzo	
October 5	"Happier" †	Marshmello and Bastille		"I Wanna Dance"	Jonas Blue		"Truth Hurts"	Lizzo	
October 12	"Happier" †	Marshmello and Bastille		"Joys"	Roberto Surace		"Truth Hurts"	Lizzo	
October 19	"Happier" †	Marshmello and Bastille		"Find U Again"	Mark Ronson featuring Camila Cabello		"Truth Hurts"	Lizzo	
October 26	"Happier" †	Marshmello and Bastille		"There for You"	Gorgon City + MK		"Truth Hurts"	Lizzo	
November 2	"Happier" †	Marshmello and Bastille		"No Letting Go"	Dirty Werk (DJ Bam Bam X Steve Smooth)		"Truth Hurts"	Lizzo	
November 9	"Happier" †	Marshmello and Bastille		"The Power"	Duke Dumont and Zak Abel		"Takeaway"	The Chainsmokers & Illenium featuring Lennon Stella	
November 16	"Happier" †	Marshmello and Bastille		"Crave"	Madonna and Swae Lee		"Home"	Lodato	
November 23	"Happier" †	Marshmello and Bastille		"OMG"	Gryffin and Carly Rae Jepsen		"Turn Me On"	Riton and Oliver Heldens featuring Vula	
November 30	"Happier" †	Marshmello and Bastille		"Pump It Up"	Endor		"Turn Me On"	Riton and Oliver Heldens featuring Vula	
December 7	"Happier" †	Marshmello and Bastille		"Good as Hell"	Lizzo		"Good as Hell"	Lizzo	
December 14	"Happier" †	Marshmello and Bastille		"Lose Control"	Meduza featuring Goodboys and Becky Hill		"Good as Hell"	Lizzo	
December 21	"Happier" †	Marshmello and Bastille		"God Is a Dancer"	Tiësto and Mabel		"Faith"	Galantis and Dolly Parton featuring Mr Probz	
December 28	"Happier" †	Marshmello and Bastille		"Trampoline"	Shaed		"Don't Start Now"	Dua Lipa	
