= You Bring On the Sun =

1992 single by Londonbeat

"You Bring on the Sun"

Single by Londonbeat

from the album Harmony
- Released: 15 June 1992
- Genre: Dance-pop
- Length: 3:39
- Label: Anxious; RCA
- Songwriters: Jimmy Chambers; George Chandler; Jimmy Helms; William Henshall
- Producer: Martyn Phillips

Londonbeat singles chronology
"A Better Love" (1990)	"You Bring on the Sun" (1992)	"That's How I Feel About You" (1992)

Music video
- "You Bring on the Sun" on YouTube

"You Bring on the Sun" is a song by British-American band Londonbeat, released in June 1992 by Anxious and RCA Records as the lead single from their third studio album, Harmony (1992). It was produced by Martyn Phillips and written by the four members of the band, and also received remixes by David Morales and Snowboy. Becoming a major European hit, it was a top-10 hit in several countries, like Austria, Belgium, Denmark, Finland, Germany, the Netherlands, Norway, Portugal, Spain and Sweden. In the UK, it peaked at number 32, and on the Eurochart Hot 100, it reached number 10 in July 1992. Outside Europe, the song peaked at number 135 in Australia. A music video was produced to promote the single, featuring the band performing in front of a giant yellow sun.

== Critical reception ==
Stephen Thomas Erlewine from AllMusic described the song as a "enjoyable" slice of early-'90s "soulful, tuneful dance-pop". British Lennox Herald deemed it "typically catchy and commercial." A reviewer from Music & Media wrote, "As if time stood still, here is vintage Londonbeat, delivering their soulful pop with those heavenly vocals and the trademark twangy guitar in the background. This will exactly fulfil the public's demand." Siân Pattenden from Smash Hits gave it three out of five.

== Track listings ==
- 12-inch maxi, Europe (1992)
1. "You Bring On the Sun" (Sunshine Samba mix) – 5:15
2. "You Bring On the Sun" (7-inch) – 3:35
3. "You Bring On the Sun" (Cruise Control mix) – 6:00
4. "You Bring On the Sun" (Cruise Control edit) – 3:50
- CD single, UK and Europe (1992)
1. "You Bring On the Sun" (7-inch) – 3:39
2. "You Bring On the Sun" (Morales club) – 5:45
3. "You Bring On the Sun" (Sunshine Samba mix) – 5:17
4. "Dreaming of You" (Deep Sleep mix) – 5:03
- CD maxi, UK and Europe (1992)
1. "You Bring On the Sun" (7-inch) – 3:39
2. "You Bring On the Sun" (Sunshine Samba mix) – 5:17
3. "Dreaming of You" (Deep Sleep mix) – 5:03

== Charts ==
=== Weekly charts ===
Chart (1992)	Peak position
Australia (ARIA)	135
Austria (Ö3 Austria Top 40)	10
Belgium (Ultratop 50 Flanders)	3
Belgium (Ultratop 50 Wallonia)	5
Denmark (IFPI)	5
Europe (Eurochart Hot 100)	10
Europe (European Hit Radio)	3
Finland (IFPI)	6
Germany (GfK)	6
Israel (Israeli Singles Chart)	4
Italy (Musica e dischi)	18
Netherlands (Dutch Top 40)	5
Netherlands (Single Top 100)	7
Norway (VG-lista)	9
Portugal (AFP)	6
Spain (AFYVE)	5
Sweden (Sverigetopplistan)	9
Switzerland (Schweizer Hitparade)	14
UK Singles (Official Charts)	32
UK Airplay (Music Week)	16
UK Dance (Music Week)	45

=== Year-end charts ===
Chart (1992)	Position
Belgium (Ultratop)	30
Europe (Eurochart Hot 100)	51
Europe (European Hit Radio)	14
Germany (Media Control)	30
Netherlands (Dutch Top 40)	42
Netherlands (Single Top 100)	64
Sweden (Topplistan)	59
Switzerland (Schweizer Hitparade)	35

== Release history ==
Region	Date	Format(s)	Label(s)	Ref.
Australia	15 June 1992	CD; cassette	Anxious; RCA	
United Kingdom	15 June 1992	7-inch vinyl; 12-inch vinyl; CD; cassette	Anxious; RCA	
Japan	21 August 1992	Mini-CD	Anxious	
