= So Cold =

So Cold may refer to:

- "So Cold" (Breaking Benjamin song), 2004
- "So Cold" (Mahalo, DLMT, and Lily Denning song), 2019
- So Cold (album), a 2001 album by Jay Tee, or the title song
- "So Cold", a song by Chris Brown from Graffiti
- "So Cold", a song by Thee Attacks
- "So Cold", a song and enemy from Undertale
- "So Cold", a song in Season 2 of Centaurworld.
