= Gonna Make You an Offer You Can't Refuse =

Single by Jimmy Helms
- B-side: "Words and Music"
- Released: February 1973
- Recorded: 1973
- Genre: Philadelphia soul
- Length: 3:37
- Label: Cube Records - BUG27
- Songwriter: John Worth
- Producer: John Worth

Performance video
- "Gonna Make You an Offer You Can't Refuse" on TopPop on YouTube

"Gonna Make You an Offer You Can't Refuse" is a song written in 1973 by John Worth, a pseudonym used by John Worsley (also known as Les Vandyke). It was originally sung by the American soul singer Jimmy Helms, and the track was arranged by Mike Moran. The single was issued by Cube Records in the UK.

The single first charted in February 1973, and it peaked at No. 8 in the UK Singles Chart, spending ten weeks in that listing. On the New Zealand Listener charts it peaked at No. 11.

Between 1972 and 1975, Helms recorded prolifically for the Cube label, largely due to the success of this song. However, he did not have another solo hit in the UK, although Helms found further chart success in both the UK and US as part of Londonbeat in 1990s.

== Cover versions ==
The song has been recorded by Lisa Linn, and The Gentle Rain (also in 1973). Les McKeown did a longer cover in his 1982 album, Heart Control.

== Other information ==
The song has appeared on a number of compilation albums including Heart & Soul (1997), Everlasting Love (1999), and Helms's own earlier collection Gonna Make You An Offer... (1975).
