= Army of Hardcore =

Single by Scooter

from the album Music for a Big Night Out
- Released: 2 November 2012
- Recorded: 2012
- Studio: Sheffield Underground Studios (Hamburg, Germany)
- Length: 2:57
- Label: Sheffield Tunes
- Songwriter(s): Massimiliano Monopoli; Jeroen Streunding
- Producer(s): Scooter

Scooter singles chronology
"4 AM" (2012)	"Army of Hardcore" (2012)	"Bigroom Blitz" (2014)

Music video
- "Army of Hardcore" on YouTube

"Army of Hardcore" is a single by German hard dance band Scooter. It was released on 2 November 2012 as the second single from their sixteenth studio album Music for a Big Night Out.

== Track listing ==
CD single / Download
No.	Title	Length
1.	"Army of Hardcore" (radio edit)	2:57
2.	"Army of Hardcore" (Extended Club Mix)	6:05

Other official versions

- "Army of Hardcore" (BMG Remix) – 4:53; on the deluxe edition of the band's seventeenth studio album The Fifth Chapter.

== Credits and personnel ==
Credits adapted from "Army of Hardcore" CD single liner notes.

Musicians & Producers

- H.P. Baxxter a.k.a. 'Bass Junkie' – MC lyrics, producer, performer, programmer
- Rick J. Jordan – mixer, engineer, producer, performer, programmer
- Michael Simon – mixer, engineer, producer, performer, programmer
- Marcel Jerome Gialelés (Jerome) – mixer, engineer

Packaging

- Martin Weiland – artwork
- Julia Dietrich – artwork
- Christian Barz – photography

== Chart performance ==
Chart performance for "Army of Hardcore"
Chart (2012)	Peak position
Germany (GfK)	77
