= In the Blood (album) =

- European and Australian CD cover art. The American CD release used the original LP version of the cover art.

Studio album by Londonbeat
- Released: September 1990
- Recorded: April – August 1990
- Genre: Dance
- Length: 49:20
- Label: Anxious / Radioactive (USA)
- Producers: David A. Stewart (track 1), Martyn Phillips (tracks 1–6, 8–12), Willy M (tracks 5, 7, 10)

Londonbeat chronology
Speak (1988)	In the Blood (1990)	Harmony (1992)

Professional ratings
Review scores
Source	Rating
AllMusic	4/5 stars
Entertainment Weekly	A−
Orlando Sentinel	4/5 stars
The Province	(favorable)
Robert Christgau	(choice cut)
St. Petersburg Times	(favorable)

In the Blood is the second album by British-American dance band Londonbeat, released in September 1990. It includes the single "I've Been Thinking About You", which reached number 2 in the UK Singles Chart in 1990 and number one on a number of world charts, including the US Billboard Hot 100 the following year.

The album reached number 21 on the US Billboard 200 and number 34 in the UK Albums Chart.

== Critical reception ==
AllMusic editor Jim Smith said, "Whether they're sensitive balladeers making a soulful dance single ("I've Been Thinking About You"), or lewd, jilted lovers making a soulful dance single ("She Broke My Heart (in 36 Places)"), Londonbeat's pleasant harmonies and pumping flow are undeniably catchy. Although their lyrics are sometimes criminally obtuse, In the Blood is a better album, musically, than it's ever been given credit for." Marisa Fox from Entertainment Weekly encouraged, "Check out the foot-stomping "She Broke My Heart (in 36 Places)", inspired by Edwin Starr’s "Twenty-Five Miles"; the churning "It’s in the Blood"; and the exuberant "She Said She Loves Me". Londonbeat's powerful dance rhythms and soulful blues songs recapture the long-lost spirit of early R&B." Parry Gettelman from Orlando Sentinel highlighted "I've Been Thinking About You" ("Cannibalistic"), "She Said She Loves Me" ("a touch of Prince"), "Getcha Ya Ya" ("zydeco flavor[ed]"), "This Is Your Life" ("a pretty acoustic number with beautiful harmonies"), "Crying in the Rain" ("echoes the Philly sound of the Dramatics") and "No Woman No Cry". He concluded that the band "shows a lot of promise".

Tom Harrison from The Province wrote, "Virtually perfect balance of old-style soul and modern production techniques resulting in a crafty contemporary dance music that embraces the reggae classic "No Woman No Cry", the Africa-via-New Orleans gumbo of "Getcha Ya Ya", the retro Philly soul of "She Broke My Heart (in 36 Places)" and more. With its second record, Londonbeat jumps ahead of such U.K. contemporaries as the Christians and Brother Beyond." David Bauder from St. Petersburg Times said, "It's not hard to cringe at the thought of a disco version of Bob Marley's "No Woman No Cry", with sampled sounds of whales and dolphins. What's hard is making that idea work. Londonbeat pulls it off, as well as most everything else, in its impressive American debut. [...] In the Blood is a deft mix of dance and hip-hop beats that doesn't skimp on soulful melodies. Led by the hit single, "I've Been Thinking About You", this disc is brimming with clever hooks."

== Track listing ==
=== UK version ===
All tracks are written by Jimmy Chambers, George Chandler, Jimmy Helms and William Henshall, except where noted.

No.	Title	Writer(s)	Length
1.	"It's in the Blood"		4:50
2.	"Getcha Ya Ya"		4:33
3.	"She Broke My Heart (in 36 Places)"		3:39
4.	"She Said She Loves Me"		4:15
5.	"Step Inside My Shoes"	Chambers, Chandler, Ian Green, Helms, Henshall	4:16
6.	"No Woman, No Cry"	Vincent Ford, Bob Marley	4:05
7.	"This Is Your Life"		2:03
8.	"I've Been Thinking About You"		5:17
9.	"A Better Love"	Chambers, Chandler, Green, Helms, Henshall	4:00
10.	"In an I Love You Mood"		4:14
11.	"You Love and Learn"		3:25
12.	"Crying in the Rain"		4:59

- "Step Inside My Shoes" available on CD versions only. It was also the B-side of the "No Woman, No Cry" single.
- On the LP release, track 8 begins side B.

=== US version ===
No.	Title	Writer(s)	Length
1.	"I've Been Thinking About You"		5:17
2.	"A Better Love"	Chambers, Chandler, Green, Helms, Henshall	4:00
3.	"No Woman, No Cry"	Ford, Marley	4:05
4.	"It's in the Blood"		4:50
5.	"Getcha Ya Ya"		4:33
6.	"Step Inside My Shoes"	Chambers, Chandler, Green, Helms, Henshall	4:16
7.	"She Broke My Heart (in 36 Places)"		3:39
8.	"She Said She Loves Me"		4:15
9.	"This Is Your Life"		2:03
10.	"Crying in the Rain"		4:59
11.	"In an I Love You Mood"		4:14
12.	"You Love and Learn"		3:25

== Charts ==
=== Weekly charts ===
Chart (1990–1991)	Peak position
Australian Albums (ARIA)	12
Austrian Albums (Ö3 Austria)	12
Dutch Albums (Album Top 100)	11
Finland (Suomen virallinen lista)	17
French Albums (SNEP)	35
German Albums (Offizielle Top 100)	15
New Zealand Albums (RMNZ)	17
Swedish Albums (Sverigetopplistan)	5
Swiss Albums (Schweizer Hitparade)	5
UK Albums (Official Charts)	34
US Billboard 200	21

=== Year-end charts ===
Chart (1990)	Position
Dutch Albums (Album Top 100)	49
Chart (1991)	Position
German Albums (Offizielle Top 100)	50
Swiss Albums (Schweizer Hitparade)	38

== Certifications ==
Region	Certification	Certified units/sales
Australia (ARIA)	Gold	35,000^{^}
Canada (Music Canada)	Platinum	100,000^{^}
Germany (BVMI)	Gold	250,000^{^}
Netherlands (NVPI)	Gold	50,000^{^}
Spain (Promusicae)	Gold	50,000^{^}
Sweden (GLF)	Platinum	100,000^{^}
Switzerland (IFPI Switzerland)	Gold	25,000^{^}
United States (RIAA)	Gold	500,000^{^}
^{^} Shipments figures based on certification alone.

== Personnel ==
=== Londonbeat ===
- Jimmy Helms – lead vocals and backing vocals, flugelhorn
- Jimmy Chambers – backing vocals
- George Chandler – backing vocals
- William Henshall – guitars, synthesizers, drum machine and sampler

Additional personnel

- Martyn Phillips - synthesizers, additional guitar, drum machine, drums and strings arrangements
- John Turnbull - lead guitar
- Ian Green - synthesizers, rhythm guitar and bass
- Louis Jardim - drums and percussions
- Danny Cummings - percussions
- Bobbie Clarke - drums
- Dave Winthrop - saxophone
- Mark Pinder - trumpet
- Gerraint Watkins - accordion
- Wilfred Gibson - strings arrangements
