= Lost (Vassy and Afrojack song) =

Single by Vassy and Afrojack featuring Oliver Rosa
- Released: 10 October 2017
- Recorded: 2017
- Length: 2:49
- Label: Armada Music
- Songwriter(s): Michelle Sharman; Ted Kurie; Vicky Karagiorgos
- Producer(s): Vassy; Nick van de Wall; Oliver Rosa

Vassy singles chronology
"Nothing to Lose" (2017)	"Lost" (2017)	"Doomsday" (2018)

"Lost" is a song recorded by Australian singer-songwriter Vassy, featuring Dutch collaborators Afrojack and Oliver Rosa. The track became Vassy's fourth number one single, the second for Afrojack, and the first for Rosa, in the United States on Billboard's Dance Club Songs chart, reaching the summit in its May 5, 2018 issue.

== Track listings ==
Digital download

1. "Lost" – 2:49

Digital download (Remixes)

1. "Lost" (Kue Mix)
2. "Lost" (Kue Chill Mix)
3. "Lost" (Ray Rhodes Mix)
4. "Lost" (Ray Rhodes Radio Mix)
5. "Lost" (AmPm Mix)
6. "Lost" (Dan Thomas Progressive House Mix)
7. "Lost" (Lodato Mix)
8. "Lost" (Lodato Radio Mix)
9. "Lost" (Lodato Instrumental Mix)

== Charts ==
=== Weekly charts ===
Chart (2017–18)	Peak position
US Dance Club Songs (Billboard)	1
US Hot Dance/Electronic Songs (Billboard)	24

=== Year-end charts ===
Chart (2018)	Position
US Dance Club Songs (Billboard)	33
