= I've Been Thinking About You =

1990 single by Londonbeat

Single by Londonbeat

from the album In the Blood
- B-side: "9AM"
- Released: August 1990
- Genre: Dance-pop; Eurodance
- Length: 5:17 (album version); 3:49 (radio edit and video version)
- Label: Anxious; RCA
- Songwriters: Jimmy Chambers; George Chandler; Jimmy Helms; William Henshall
- Producer: Martyn Phillips

Londonbeat singles chronology
"It Takes Two Baby" (1989)	"I've Been Thinking About You" (1990)	"A Better Love" (1990)

Music video
- "I've Been Thinking About You" on YouTube

"I've Been Thinking About You" is a song by British band Londonbeat, released in August 1990 by Anxious and RCA Records as the lead single from their second studio album, In the Blood (1990). The song was produced by Martyn Phillips, and written by band members Jimmy Chambers, George Chandler, Jimmy Helms, and William Henshall.

"I've Been Thinking About You" became a worldwide hit, reaching the number-one spot in more than 10 countries—including Australia, Canada, Germany and the United States—and peaking at number two on the UK Singles Chart. The song was the number-one airplay track in the US for 1991 and was the BMI Awards Winner for 1992 Song of the Year. Two different music videos were produced to promote the single.

== Critical reception ==
AllMusic editor Jim Smith described the song as "soulful dance", noting that Londonbeat's "pleasant harmonies and pumping flow are undeniably catchy". Another AllMusic editor, Stephen Thomas Erlewine, called it "dazzling". David Taylor-Wilson from Bay Area Reporter declared it as "infectious", remarking that the band "blends Motownlike harmonies with dance grooves that incorporate ’70s funk rhythms". A reviewer from Billboard magazine complimented its "tasty blend" and "unshakable pop hook". Steve Morse from Boston Globe named it "a catchy soul-funk ditty" and "a deserved hit". Marisa Fox from Entertainment Weekly noted its "hypnotically catchy chorus, sweet harmonies, and slow, rollicking beat". Dave Sholin from the Gavin Report commented, "It's always a treat when a song comes along that I can't wait to review. Impossible not to detect a Fine Young Cannibals influence on this production that's been the biggest buzz record for the past couple of weeks." He added, "An international smash that's gone to #1 in no less than eleven countries, it's destined to win over audiences in the U.S.A., too. Top 40 radio is in dire need of more music like this!"

Pan-European magazine Music & Media wrote, "C&W-tinged pop number underpins the band's characteristic massed gospel vocal style complete with jangling, melodic guitars and the sort of chorus which they patently lacked on their debut LP Speak. The first release from the forthcoming second LP In the Blood shows a definite maturity." David Giles from Music Week found that the band have "taken note of dancefloor developments and ditched the go go based rhythms of old for a deep-rooted funkiness and R&B influenced vocal." Stephen Holden from New York Times wrote, "Londonbeat is a textbook example of a group that recombines familiar pop-soul sounds in a personal and engaging way. Its single [...] blends the light, machine-driven rhythms of Soul II Soul with the post-Motown vocal style of Fine Young Cannibals." Parry Gettelman from Orlando Sentinel noted that "its dance groove is blended with lush, postmodern R&B played on both synthesized and gen-u-ine instruments." Ian Cranna from Smash Hits said the rhythm is "straight out of the Stock, Aitken & Watermans book of bounciness". Bob Mack from Spin felt it "is too damn catchy".

== Chart performance ==
In Europe, "I've Been Thinking About You" peaked at number one in Austria, Belgium, Finland, Germany, Italy, Luxembourg, the Netherlands, Spain, Sweden and Switzerland, as well as on the Eurochart Hot 100. Additionally, it reached number two in Norway and the United Kingdom. In the latter country, it peaked during its sixth week on the UK Singles Chart, on 6 October 1990. The song was also a top-10 hit in Denmark, Greece and Ireland. Outside Europe, "I've Been Thinking About You" topped the US Billboard Hot 100, Cash Box Top 100 and Billboard Dance Club Play charts, as well as the Australian, Canadian, Israeli and Zimbabwean charts. In Israel, it peaked at number one for two weeks from 21 October 1990. It was awarded with a gold record in Austria, Germany and the US; a silver record in the UK; and a platinum record in Australia, the Netherlands and Sweden.

== Impact and legacy ==
"I've Been Thinking About You" became the no. 1 radio airplay record in the US and was the BMI Awards Winner for 1992 Song of the Year, honoring the songwriters, composers and music publishers of the song. It was also awarded one of BMI's Pop Awards in the category for Million Performance Songs in 1993. Australian music channel Max included the song in their list of "1000 Greatest Songs of All Time" in 2013. American magazine Billboard placed "I've Been Thinking About You" at number 158 in their ranking of "Billboard's Top Songs of the '90s" in 2019.

== Track listings ==
- 7-inch single
1. "I've Been Thinking About You" – 3:49
2. "9AM" (live at Moles) – 5:49
- CD maxi
1. "I've Been Thinking About You" (7-inch version) – 3:49
2. "I've Been Thinking About You" (C'est Wot mix) – 5:38
3. "9AM" (live at Moles) – 5:49
- CD maxi and cassette maxi – US
1. "I've Been Thinking About You" (Def 12-inch mix) – 6:50
2. "I've Been Thinking About You" (Red Zone mix) – 4:42
3. "I've Been Thinking About You" (reprise) – 1:33
4. "I've Been Thinking About You" (vocal dub) – 5:50
5. "I've Been Thinking About You" (the Eclipse mix) – 4:12
6. "I've Been Thinking About You" (Trak mix) – 3:05
- CD single
1. "I've Been Thinking About You" – 3:49
2. "9AM" (live at Moles) – 5:49
- 12-inch maxi
1. "I've Been Thinking About You" (C'est Wot mix)
2. "I've Been Thinking About You" (Force Feel dub mix)
3. "I've Been Thinking About You" (7-inch version)
- 12-inch maxi
1. "I've Been Thinking About You" (extended club mix)
2. "I've Been Thinking About You" (radio edit)
3. "I've Been Thinking About You" (instrumental)
4. "I've Been Thinking About You" (dub)

== Personnel ==
Londonbeat

- Jimmy Helms – lead vocals
- Jimmy Chambers – backing vocals
- George Chandler – backing vocals
- William Henshall – guitar, programming, keyboards

Additional personnel

- Martyn Phillips - keyboards, additional guitar, drums

== Charts ==
=== Weekly charts ===
Chart (1990–1991)	Peak position
Australia (ARIA)	1
Austria (Ö3 Austria Top 40)	1
Belgium (Ultratop 50 Flanders)	1
Canada Retail Singles (The Record)	1
Canada Top Singles (RPM)	1
Canada Adult Contemporary (RPM)	5
Canada Dance/Urban (RPM)	3
Denmark (IFPI)	3
Europe (Eurochart Hot 100)	1
Finland (Suomen virallinen lista)	1
France (SNEP)	11
Germany (GfK)	1
Greece (IFPI)	3
Ireland (IRMA)	9
Israel (Israeli Singles Chart)	1
Italy (Musica e dischi)	1
Luxembourg (Radio Luxembourg)	1
Netherlands (Dutch Top 40)	1
Netherlands (Single Top 100)	1
New Zealand (Recorded Music NZ)	5
Norway (VG-lista)	2
Spain (AFYVE)	1
Sweden (Sverigetopplistan)	1
Switzerland (Schweizer Hitparade)	1
UK Singles (Official Charts)	2
US Billboard Hot 100	1
US Adult Contemporary (Billboard)	7
US Dance Club Songs (Billboard)	1
US Dance Singles Sales (Billboard)	2
US Hot R&B/Hip-Hop Songs (Billboard)	83
US Cash Box Top 100	1
Zimbabwe (ZIMA)	1

Chart (2020)	Peak position
Poland Airplay (ZPAV)	63

=== Year-end charts ===
Chart (1990)	Position
Belgium (Ultratop)	5
Europe (Eurochart Hot 100)	24
Germany (Media Control)	22
Israel (Israeli Singles Chart)	23
Netherlands (Dutch Top 40)	2
Netherlands (Single Top 100)	2
Sweden (Topplistan)	1
UK Singles (OCC)	29

Chart (1991)	Position
Australia (ARIA)	8
Canada Top Singles (RPM)	14
Canada Adult Contemporary (RPM)	40
Canada Dance/Urban (RPM)	19
Europe (Eurochart Hot 100)	14
Germany (Media Control)	19
New Zealand (RIANZ)	32
Switzerland (Schweizer Hitparade)	26
US Billboard Hot 100	31
US 12-inch Singles Sales (Billboard)	17
US Dance Club Play (Billboard)	16
US Cash Box Top 100	17

Chart (2024)	Position
Kazakhstan Airplay (TopHit)	156

=== Decade-end charts ===
Chart (1990–1999)	Position
Canada (Nielsen SoundScan)	50
Netherlands (Dutch Top 40)	78

== Certifications ==
Region	Certification	Certified units/sales
Australia (ARIA)	Platinum	70,000^{^}
Austria (IFPI Austria)	Gold	25,000^{*}
Germany (BVMI)	Gold	250,000^{^}
Netherlands (NVPI)	Platinum	100,000^{^}
Sweden (GLF)	Platinum	50,000^{^}
United Kingdom (BPI)	Silver	200,000^{^}
United States (RIAA)	Gold	500,000^{^}
^{*} Sales figures based on certification alone.^{^} Shipments figures based on certification alone.

== Release history ==
Region	Date	Format(s)	Label(s)	Ref.
United Kingdom	August 1990	—N/a	Anxious; RCA	
Australia	22 October 1990	7-inch vinyl; 12-inch vinyl	Anxious; RCA	
Australia	29 October 1990	Cassette	Anxious; RCA	
Japan	1 January 1991	Mini-CD	Anxious; RCA	

== Other versions ==
- In 2019, German DJ/producer Klaas remixed a version of the song featuring newly recorded vocals from Londonbeat.
- The song is heavily sampled by Alcazar in their 2004 single "Physical".
- The track "Vojnik sreće", from Bosnian artist Dino Merlin's debut studio album, Moja bogda sna, interpolates the song.

== See also ==
- List of European number-one airplay songs of the 1990s
- List of Billboard number-one dance songs of 2019
