= The Fifth Chapter (Scooter album) =

Studio album by Scooter
- Released: 26 September 2014
- Recorded: 2013–2014
- Studio: Sheffield Underground Studios, (Hamburg, Germany)
- Genre: EDM; electro house
- Length: 58:01
- Label: Sheffield Tunes, Kontor
- Producer: Scooter

Scooter chronology
20 Years of Hardcore (2013)	The Fifth Chapter (2014)	Ace (2016)

Singles from The Fifth Chapter
- 1. "Bigroom Blitz" Released: 23 May 2014; 2. "Today" Released: 5 September 2014; 3. "Can't Stop the Hardcore" Released: 5 December 2014; 4. "Radiate (SPY Version)" Released: 29 May 2015

Professional ratings
Review scores
Source	Rating
Random.Access	7.5/10

The Fifth Chapter (also stylized as T5C) is the seventeenth studio album by German band Scooter released on 26 September 2014.

== Background ==
The Fifth Chapter is the first album by Scooter to not feature production by Rick J. Jordan, after his departure at the start of 2014. Jordan was replaced by Phil Speiser. It is also the first album which was released on vinyl LP since 1996's Our Happy Hardcore.

== Track listing ==
All tracks produced by Scooter, except "Today" and "Radiate" produced by Scooter and Vassy.

No.	Title	Writer(s)	Length
1.	"T5C"	H.P. Baxxter; Phil Speiser; Jens Thele	1:18
2.	"Who's That Rave?"	Baxxter; Speiser; Thele	2:47
3.	"Today" (Scooter and Vassy)	Baxxter; Speiser; Michael Simon; Thele; Achim Jannsen; Gareth Owen; Tony Verdult; Koen Groeneveld; Margareta L. J. Greet Voermans; Adriaan Addy van der Zwan	3:27
4.	"We Got the Sound"	Baxxter; Speiser; Simon; Thele; Jannsen; Brad Grobler; Eddy Steeneken	2:54
5.	"Radiate" (Scooter and Vassy)	Vassy Karagiorgos; Nik Frost; Jesse Glick; Baxxter; Speiser; Thele	3:07
6.	"999 (Call the Police)"	Baxxter; Speiser; Simon; Thele; Owen; Steeneken	3:35
7.	"King of the Land"	Baxxter; Speiser; Simon; Thele; Niclas Lundin; Leon Paul Palmen	3:00
8.	"Bigroom Blitz"	Baxxter; Speiser; Simon; Thele; Franz Henig; Stephen Singer; Cosmo Hickox	3:06
9.	"Chopstick (Mado Kara Mieru)"	Christopher Chiyan Tin	4:48
10.	"Home Again"	Baxxter; Speiser; Simon; Thele	3:41
11.	"Fuck Forever"	Baxxter; Speiser; Simon; Thele; Steeneken; Antoine Konrad; Fabio Antoniali	3:06
12.	"Jaguare"	Baxxter; Speiser; Thele	3:56
13.	"T.O.O."	Baxxter; Speiser; Thele	4:10
14.	"Listen"	Ashley Ingram; Errol Kennedy; Leee John; Steve Jolley; Tony Swain	3:46
15.	"Can't Stop the Hardcore"	Leo Caerts; Leo Rozenstraten	3:34
16.	"Fallin'"	Baxxter; Speiser; Thele; Jessica Jean	4:10
17.	"In Need"	Baxxter; Speiser; Thele	3:36

Deluxe edition bonus disc
No.	Title	Writer(s)	Length
1.	"How Much Is the Fish? (Tony Junior Remix)"	Baxxter; Rick J. Jordan; Axel Coon; Thele	3:44
2.	"Maria (I Like It Loud) (R.I.O. Remix)"	Baxxter; Jordan; Jay Frog; Thele	3:18
3.	"Move Your Ass! (Stefan Dabruck Remix)"	Baxxter; Jordan; Ferris Bueller; Thele	6:09
4.	"Army of Hardcore (BMG Remix)"	Massimiliano Monopoli; Jeroen Streunding	4:53
5.	"Friends (NRG Remix)"	Baxxter; Jordan; Bueller; Thele	3:20
6.	"Jigga Jigga! (Dave202 Remix)"	Baxxter; Jordan; Frog; Thele	4:16
7.	"I'm Lonely (Kindervater Remix)"	Jef Martens; Baxxter; Jordan; Simon; Thele	3:15
8.	"Posse (I Need You on the Floor) (Amfree Remix)"	Baxxter; Jordan; Coon; Thele	4:01
9.	"Fire (Laserkraft 3D Remix)"	Baxxter; Jordan; Bueller; Thele	5:00
10.	"Shake That! (Barany Attila and DJ Dominque Remix)"	Harry Wayne Casey; Richard Raymond Finch; Baxxter; Jordan; Frog; Thele	2:41

iTunes bonus tracks
No.	Title	Writer(s)	Length
11.	"Vallée de Larmes (Lissat & Voltaxx Remix)"	DJ Zki & Dobre	3:54
12.	"Jigga Jigga! (Dave202 Arena Remix)"	Baxxter; Jordan; Frog; Thele	6:16

== Singles ==
The first single was "Bigroom Blitz" which featured American rapper Wiz Khalifa. It was released on 23 May 2014. The second single "Today" was released on 5 September 2014 as one-track single and on 26 September 2014 as maxi-single. The third single "Can't Stop the Hardcore" was released on 5 December 2014. The fourth single "Radiate" featuring Vassy was released on 29 May 2015.

== Personnel ==
- H.P. Baxxter – MC lyrics
- Phil Speiser – mixer, engineer
- Vassy – producer (track 3, 5), female vocals (track 3, 5)
- Jessica Jean – vocals (track 7, 14, 16)
- Yasmin K. – vocals (track 4)
- Dan Priddy – additional vocals (track 10)
- Gareth Owen – additional vocals (track 6)

== Charts ==
Chart (2014)	Peak position
Austrian Albums (Ö3 Austria)	28
Czech Albums (ČNS IFPI)	21
German Albums (Offizielle Top 100)	8
Hungarian Albums (MAHASZ)	30
Swiss Albums (Schweizer Hitparade)	23

== Release history ==
Release history and formats for The Fifth Chapter
Region	Date	Label	Format
Germany	26 September 2014	Sheffield Tunes	CD; LP; Digital download

== Notes ==
- "Today" contains lyrics from "Discohopping" by Klubbheads.
- "Bigroom Blitz" interpolates elements from "Hadi Bakalim" by Sezen Aksu, as written by Onno Tunç, and includes Wiz Khalifa's rap sample from the song "Yoko" by Berner feat. Wiz Khalifa, Chris Brown and Big K.R.I.T.. The T5C album includes re-recorded version of "Bigroom Blitz" where Wiz Khalifa's part is replaced with the one by the voice actor Cosmo Hickox due to copyright violation.
- "Chopstick (Mado Kara Mieru)" is Scooter's version of the 2009's song "Mado Kara Mieru" from the album Calling All Dawns by Christopher Tin.
- "Fuck Forever" contains a melody based on "Mammoth" by Dimitri Vegas & Like Mike with Moguai.
- "Listen" contains samples from Avicii's remix of Lenny Kravitz's song "Superlove".
- "Can't Stop the Hardcore" samples the melody from Greek dance Sirtaki and the singing melody from "Eviva España" by Samantha.
- "T.O.O." stands for "The Only One". Scooter already have a song called The Only One therefore it has been shortened to T.O.O.*
