= Love Yourself (Billy Porter song) =

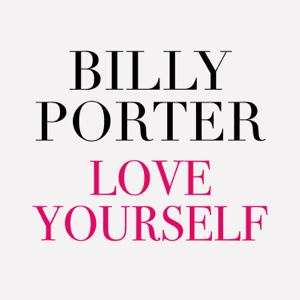

Single by Billy Porter
- Released: June 14, 2019
- Length: 4:12
- Label: Butler Music
- Songwriter: D. Smith
- Producer: D. Smith

Billy Porter singles chronology
"You Gotta Be" (2019)	"Love Yourself" (2019)

"Love Yourself" is a 2019 song by Billy Porter, written and produced by D. Smith. It reached number one on the Dance Club Songs chart in the issue dated September 7, 2019.

== Charts ==
=== Weekly charts ===
Chart (2019)	Peak position
US Dance Club Songs (Billboard)	1

=== Year-end charts ===
Chart (2019)	Position
US Dance Club Songs (Billboard)	46

== See also ==
- List of Billboard number-one dance songs of 2019
