= There for You (Gorgon City and MK song) =

Single by Gorgon City and MK
- Released: 16 August 2019
- Genre: House
- Length: 3:06
- Label: Virgin EMI
- Songwriters: Bhavik Pattani; Frida Waage Amundsen; Hiten Bharadia; Kye Gibbon; Marc Kinchen; Matthew Robson-Scott
- Producers: Gorgon City; MK

Gorgon City singles chronology
| "Elizabeth Street" (2019) | "There for You" (2019) | "Baggage" (2019) |

"There for You" is a song by English production duo Gorgon City and American DJ MK, released as a single on 16 August 2019. It reached number one on the US Billboard Dance Club Songs chart.

== Critical reception ==
Writing for Dancing Astronaut, Harry Levin called the "lyrical message [...] typical and formulaic", but said that both Gorgon City and MK "rarely deviate from simple themes because they always deliver them in fine style". He also complimented the "piano rhythms" as "smooth rather than foreboding", the "vocal harmonies" as "uplifting and serene" and the drums as "tight and succinct". Vivian Lin of Earmilk wrote that the track features "MK's signature piano melodies and [is] laced with Gorgon City's intrinsic uplifting dispositions" and that it contains "classic house traits as the track effortlessly glides over stirring soundscapes". The cover artwork was designed by Samuel Muir Studio.

== Track listing ==
Remixes single
| No. | Title | Length |
|---|---|---|
| 1. | "There for You" (Warehouse Mix) | 5:31 |
| 2. | "There for You" (Terrace Dub) | 6:03 |

== Charts ==
=== Weekly charts ===
| Chart (2019) | Peak position |
|---|---|
| Belgium Dance (Ultratop Flanders) | 50 |
| UK Singles (Official Charts) | 99 |
| UK Dance (Official Charts) | 19 |
| US Dance Club Songs (Billboard) | 1 |
| US Hot Dance/Electronic Songs (Billboard) | 14 |

=== Year-end charts ===
| Chart (2019) | Position |
|---|---|
| US Dance Club Songs (Billboard) | 20 |

== Certifications ==
| Region | Certification | Certified units/sales |
|---|---|---|
| United Kingdom (BPI) | Silver | 200,000^{‡} |
^{‡} Sales+streaming figures based on certification alone.

== See also ==
- List of Billboard number-one dance songs of 2019
