= JSD Band =

Scottish-based Celtic and folk rock band

- Origin: Scotland
- Genres: Celtic rock, folk rock
- Years active: 1969–1974,1997–1998, 2013–present
- Labels: Regal Zonophone, Cube, KRL, Polydor
- Members: Jim Divers; Sean O'Rourke; Des Coffield; Chuck Fleming; Colin Finn; Rob Mairs
- Past members: Lindsay Scott; Iain Lyon

The JSD Band was an influential Scottish-based Celtic and folk rock band primarily active from 1969 to 1974 and then again briefly from 1997 to 1998. The band released five full-length albums and a handful of singles.

== Band History ==
The JSD Band formed in 1969 and derived its name from the first letter of the first name of each of its three founding members: Jim Divers, Sean O’Rourke, and Des Coffield. Drummer Colin Finn and fiddler/mandolinist Chuck Fleming also joined the group, rounding out the five-member lineup.

Initially, the band played the folk-club circuit with other artists such as Billy Connolly and Gerry Rafferty of the Humblebums, and Barbara Dickson. After getting noticed for their lively electric-rock approach to traditional Scottish folk music when they won the Scottish Folk Group Championships at Edinburgh's Usher Hall, they made appearances on BBC Radio 1 with DJ John Peel and on BBC Two's Old Grey Whistle Test hosted by "Whispering" Bob Harris.

In 1971, the JSD Band released its first album entitled Country of the Blind on the Regal Zonophone label.

Lindsay Scott replaced Chuck Fleming on fiddle in 1972. The band signed with Cube Records and released their second album, the self-titled JSD Band. The group continued to tour, including as support band for the UK leg of David Bowie's Ziggy Stardust Tour.

Fleming re-joined in 1973, and the band released a third album that year, Travelling Days, again on Cube Records. Fleming left again, replaced this time by Iain Lyon, previously of Johnny & The Copycats/My Dear Watson. This lineup issued two more singles on Cube before breaking up in July 1974.

The group reunited in 1997 as a four-piece, featuring Divers, O'Rourke, Finn, and Fleming, releasing the album For the Record, a collection of newly recorded acoustic versions of previously released material. They expanded back to a five-piece group the following year with the addition of long-time friend of the group, Rob Mairs, on five-string banjo and dobro, releasing an album of new material, Pastures of Plenty. Both records were released on Lochshore, an imprint of KRL Records, a Glasgow-based label specializing in Scottish traditional music,

In 2013, the band reformed and began playing again with all the original members and Rob Mairs, and remains intermittently active to the present day.

== Discography ==
=== Albums ===
- Country of the Blind (1971) Regal Zonophone
- JSD Band (1972) Cube Records
- Travelling Days (1973) Cube Records
- For the Record (1997) Lochshore/KRL Records
- Pastures of Plenty (1998) Lochshore/KRL Records

=== Singles ===
- Sarah Jane / Paddy Stacks (1973) Cube Records
- Sunshine Life For Me (Sail Away Raymond) / Hayes And Harlington Blues (1974) Cube Records
- Sunshine Life For Me (Sail Away Raymond) / Reel Call (1974) Cube Records
- Hayes And Harlington Blues / Cuckoo (1974) Cube Records
