= Harmony (Londonbeat album) =

Studio album by Londonbeat
- Released: 7 September 1992
- Recorded: June 1991–June 1992
- Studio: Londonbeat; Sam Therapy; Battery Studios; AIR Studios; Sarm West Studios; The Church; (London, England)
- Genre: R&B; dance
- Length: 50:08
- Label: Anxious
- Producer: Martyn Phillips

Londonbeat chronology
In the Blood (1990)	Harmony (1992)	Londonbeat (1994)

Alternative cover

Professional ratings
Review scores
Source	Rating
Calgary Herald	C

Harmony is the third album by British-based American R&B/dance group Londonbeat, released in 1992 (No U.S. release) on the Anxious label. Although less successful than its predecessor In the Blood, Harmony produced two minor UK hits, "You Bring on the Sun" (#32) and "That's How I Feel About You" (#69). The former also reached the top 20 in Italy, Sweden, Norway, Switzerland and Austria.

== Track listing ==
All tracks written by Jimmy Helms, George Chandler, Jimmy Chambers and William Henshall, unless otherwise stated.

1. "You Bring on the Sun" – 3:34
2. "Lover You Send Me Colours" – 4:17
3. "That's How I Feel About You" – 3:56
4. "Some Lucky Guy" – 4:34
5. "Secret Garden" – 3:58
6. "Give a Gift to Yourself" – 2:48
7. "Harmony" – 7:07
8. "All Born Equal" (Helms, Chandler, Chambers, Henshall, Allen) – 4:03
9. "Rainbow Ride" – 5:09
10. "Keeping the Memories Alive" – 4:17
11. "The Sea of Tranquility" – 6:25

== Personnel ==
Credits for Harmony adapted from the CD liner notes.

=== Londonbeat ===
- Jimmy Chambers – vocals, additional lead vocals
- George Chandler – vocals, additional lead vocals
- Jimmy Helms – lead vocals, vocals, flugelhorn, prophet peace piano, muted trumpet
- William Henshall – acoustic guitars, electric guitars, trumpet guitar, T3 Saturn pad, T3 synth pad, VS synth pad, marimbas, wavestation majestic strings, prophet hit, J 200 acoustic guitar, synthesised resonance sweep, slide guitars, space guitar effects, Jupiter flute solo, drum machine, VS strings, gossamer guitar fx, Moog bass, prophet strings, sounds of sailing in the Gulf of Mexico
- Charles Pierre – drums and percussion, drum machine, funky additional production, Moog bass, pop and whistle keyboards, additional funky vibes, filtered string bass, bazouki bells

=== Other musicians ===
- Miguel Barradas – steel drums
- Kyle Chandler – congas
- Dr Horace Dobbs – didgeridoo
- Daryl Hall – vocals, lead vocals
- Zeb Jameson – M1 piano, P5 summer rain sequence
- Luís Jardim – tambourine, shaker, cowbell, maracas, darabuka
- Tony Patler – Jupiter bass, acoustic piano
- Martyn Phillips – drums, drum machine, tx bass, Akai piano, Moog bass, Moogy sequences, bouncing strings, UV bleeps, glockenspiel, textures, guitar, funky guitar, guitar harmonics, bleeps, bells, bobs, one string picky guitars, FM & Arp sequencers, vs majestic strings, string quartet arrangement, intro mood space, mouth ARP, synthesis, arpeggiator, filtered string bass, muted bridge guitar, Solina string machine, aah pads, hypnotic sequencer, temple bowl
- Courtney Pine – sopranino saxophone
- Tony Pleeth – cello
- Davy Spillane – Uilleann pipes, whistles, Irish whistle
- Mick Talbot – C3 organ
- Johnny Turnbull – e bow guitar, guitar harmonics
- Alan Vosper – dobro guitar
- Nathan Watts – bass guitar
- Fred Wesley – trombone
- Gavin Wright – violin, viola

=== Production ===
- Produced, engineered and programmed by Martyn Phillips
- Production, engineering, programming and mix help from Willy M
- Mixed by Bryan 'Chuck' New and Martyn Phillips except for "You Bring on the Sun", mixed by Martyn Phillips, "Rainbow Ride" mixed by Humberto Garcia and "Give a Gift to Yourself" mixed by Martyn Phillips and Willy M

== Chart performance ==
Chart (1992)	Peak position
Australian Albums (ARIA)	181
Finland (Suomen virallinen lista)	33
German Albums (Offizielle Top 100)	24
Dutch Albums (Album Top 100)	15
Swedish Albums (Sverigetopplistan)	27
Swiss Albums (Schweizer Hitparade)	27
