= Put Your Phone Down (Low) =

Single by Jack Back
- Released: 1 March 2019
- Recorded: 2019
- Length: 2:58
- Songwriter(s): David Guetta
- Producer(s): David Guetta

Jack Back singles chronology
"Grenade" (2018)	"Put Your Phone Down (Low)" (2019)

"Put Your Phone Down (Low)" is a song produced and recorded by David Guetta under the alias Jack Back, released as a single on 1 March 2019. The single became Guetta's thirteenth number one (and his third under the Jack Back alias) on Billboard's Dance Club Songs chart, reaching the summit in its 18 May 2019 issue.

== Track listing ==
Digital download
No.	Title	Length
1.	"Put Your Phone Down (Low)"	2:58

Digital download
No.	Title	Length
1.	"Survivor (Extended Mix)"	5:23
2.	"Put Your Phone Down (Low) (Extended mix)"	5:41

== Charts ==
=== Weekly charts ===
Chart (2019)	Peak position
US Dance Club Songs (Billboard)	1
US Hot Dance/Electronic Songs (Billboard)	29

=== Year-end charts ===
Chart (2019)	Position
US Dance Club Songs (Billboard)	44

== See also ==
- List of Billboard number-one dance songs of 2019
