= Today (Scooter song) =

Single by Scooter featuring Vassy

from the album The Fifth Chapter
- Released: 5 September 2014
- Length: 3:27
- Songwriters: Jens Thele; Michael Simon; H.P. Baxxter; Achim Jannsen; Gareth Owen; Tony Verdult; Koen Groeneveld; Margareta L. J. Greet Voermans; Adriaan Addy van der Zwan

Scooter singles chronology
"Bigroom Blitz" (2014)	"Today" (2014)	"Can't Stop the Hardcore" (2014)

Vassy singles chronology
"Bad" (2014)	"Today" (2014)	"Secrets" (2015)

Music video
- "Today" on YouTube

"Today" is a 2014 single by German musical group Scooter featuring Australian singer Vassy. It was released as the second single from their seventeenth album The Fifth Chapter.

== Background ==
The song made its debut on 5 September 2014 as a one-track download. It was released as maxi-single and as 2-track CD single on 26 September 2014.

== Track listings ==
Download (1-track)
No.	Title	Length
1.	"Today"	3:27

CD single (2-track)
No.	Title	Length
1.	"Today" (radio edit)	3:29
2.	"Today" (extended mix)	4:15

Download (Maxi-Single)
No.	Title	Length
1.	"Today"	3:27
2.	"Today" (extended mix)	4:14
3.	"Today" (Scooter Remix)	3:52
4.	"Today" (Crew Cardinal Remix)	5:15

== Charts ==
Weekly chart performance
Chart (2014)	Peak position
CIS Airplay (TopHit)	143
Germany (GfK)	75
Russia Airplay (TopHit)	150
Ukraine Airplay (TopHit)	173

== Release history ==
Release history and formats for "Today"
Region	Date	Format	Label
Ireland	26 September 2014	Digital download	All Around the World; Sheffield Tunes
United Kingdom	26 September 2014	Digital download	All Around the World; Sheffield Tunes
