= Home (Lodato song) =

Single by Lodato
- Released: September 16, 2019
- Recorded: 2019
- Length: 2:49
- Label: Overdrive
- Songwriter(s): Salvatore Lodato
- Producer(s): Salvadore Lodato

Lodato singles chronology
"Doomsday" (2018)	"Home" (2019)

"Home" is a song recorded, written, and sung by Chandler Leighton and Rez and produced by American musician Salvatore Lodato. The track became Lodato's first number one on Billboard's Dance/Mix Show Airplay chart, reaching the summit in the November 16, 2019 issue.

== Charts ==
Chart (2019)	Peak position
US Dance/Mix Show Airplay (Billboard)	1
US Dance Club Songs (Billboard)	42
