= Trouble (Vassy song) =

Single by Vassy
- Released: 27 September 2019
- Recorded: 2019
- Length: 3:00
- Label: Spinnin'; KMV/Sony Red
- Songwriter(s): Vicky Karagiorgos
- Producer(s): Vicky Karagiorgos; Dan Muckala

Vassy singles chronology
"Concrete Heart" (2018)	"Trouble" (2019)

"Trouble" is a song recorded by Australian singer/songwriter Vassy. The track became Vassy's eleventh charted single in the United States on Billboard's Dance Club Songs chart, as well as her eighth charted single at Dance/Mix Show Airplay, where it reached number 5 in December 2019, her highest on the latter so far.

== Background ==
In an interview with Billboard's Dance Chart Upstarts, Vassy noted that "'Trouble' is a song about taking risks in life, about not being afraid to attract a little trouble... It's about how you look at life, having a positive outlook. 'Trouble' is more of an attitude than a predicament. She went further to add that "I wanted to create a song that embodies an uplifting tone with a little bit of attitude to encourage my fans to take chances and not be afraid of the rejections that they may encounter in life. It's a nice balance of pop-leaning dance with a fusion of EDM drops, yet embracing a more traditional songwriting style. I wanted to embellish and embody all the different musical elements that make up who I am today as an artist. After all, I like a little trouble in my life."

== Track listings ==
Digital download and stream

1. "Trouble" – 3:00
2. "Trouble" (extended mix) – 3:17

== Charts ==
=== Weekly charts ===
Chart (2019)	Peak position
US Dance Club Songs (Billboard)	2
US Hot Dance/Electronic Songs (Billboard)	19

=== Year-end charts ===
Chart (2020)	Position
US Hot Dance/Electronic Songs (Billboard)	91
