= 4 AM (Scooter song) =

2012 single by Scooter

Single by Scooter

from the album Music for a Big Night Out
- Released: 7 September 2012
- Length: 3:16
- Label: Sheffield Tunes
- Songwriter(s): Beverley Craven; H. P. Baxxter; Jens Thele; Michael Simon; Rick J. Jordan

Scooter singles chronology
"It's a Biz (Ain't Nobody)" (2012)	"4 AM" (2012)	"Army of Hardcore" (2012)

"4 AM" is a single by German electronic dance band Scooter. It was released on 7 September 2012 as the lead single from their sixteenth studio album Music for a Big Night Out. The song samples the 1991 single "Promise Me" by Beverley Craven and "Million Voices" by Otto Knows. Vocals credited to Jaye Marshall. It has gained much success in Russia, becoming their first top 10 hit-single since "Shake That!".

== Track listings ==
Download
No.	Title	Length
1.	"4 AM" (radio version)	3:16
2.	"4 AM" (club extended)	5:31

UK download
No.	Title	Length
1.	"4 AM" (radio edit)	3:16
2.	"4 AM" (club mix)	5:31
3.	"4 AM" (Picco Edit)	3:59
4.	"4 AM" (Picco Remix)	5:29
5.	"4 AM" (Clubstar Remix)	3:25

== Chart performance ==
=== Weekly charts ===
Weekly chart performance for "4 AM"
Chart (2012–2013)	Peak position
Czech Republic (Rádio – Top 100)	27
Finland Downloads (Suomen virallinen latauslista)	29
Germany (GfK)	96
Russia Airplay (TopHit)	5
UK Singles (Official Charts Company)	177
Ukraine Airplay (TopHit)	90

=== Year-end charts ===
2012 year-end chart performance for "4 AM"
Chart (2012)	Position
Russia Airplay (TopHit)	95

2013 year-end chart performance for "4 AM"
Chart (2013)	Position
Russia Airplay (TopHit)	13
Ukraine Airplay (TopHit)	170
