= Bigroom Blitz =

Single by Scooter featuring Wiz Khalifa

from the album The Fifth Chapter
- Released: 23 May 2014
- Recorded: 2013–2014
- Genre: Electro house; hip house; EDM
- Length: 3:08
- Songwriter(s): Jens Thele, Michael Simon, H.P. Baxxter, Stephen Singer, Vamp Lady, Phil Speiser, Cameron Jibril Thomaz (Cosmo Hickox), Franz Henig

Scooter singles chronology
"Army of Hardcore" (2012)	"Bigroom Blitz" (2014)	"Today" (2014)

Wiz Khalifa singles chronology
"We Dem Boyz" (2014)	"Bigroom Blitz" (2014)	"Shell Shocked" (2014)

Music video
- "Bigroom Blitz" on YouTube

"Bigroom Blitz" (also stylized as "Big Room Blitz") is the 2014 single by German musical group Scooter featuring American rapper Wiz Khalifa. It was released as the first single from their seventeenth album The Fifth Chapter. The song samples Turkish singer Sezen Aksu's song "Hadi Bakalım" from her 1991 studio album Gülümse. The vocals by Wiz Khalifa were cut from the 2013 song "Yoko" by Berner feat. Wiz Khalifa, Chris Brown and Big K.R.I.T. and were replaced on the re-release (by just "Scooter", not "feat. Wiz Khalifa") and the album with the vocals by Cosmo Hickox due to copyright violations. The track has become their first chart entry in France in 12 years, showing the most long-standing performance there since the release of "Move Your Ass!" in 1995.

== Track listings ==
CD single (2-track)
No.	Title	Length
1.	"Bigroom Blitz" (featuring Wiz Khalifa; Radio Mix)	3:08
2.	"Bigroom Blitz" (featuring Wiz Khalifa; Scooter Remix)	3:59

Download
No.	Title	Length
1.	"Bigroom Blitz" (featuring Wiz Khalifa; Radio Mix)	3:07
2.	"Bigroom Blitz" (featuring Wiz Khalifa; Scooter Remix)	4:00
3.	"Bigroom Blitz" (featuring Wiz Khalifa; Extended Mix)	4:14
4.	"Bigroom Blitz" (featuring Wiz Khalifa; P.A.F.F. Remix)	5:06

Download (re-release)
No.	Title	Length
1.	"Bigroom Blitz" (Radio Mix)	3:06
2.	"Bigroom Blitz" (Scooter Remix)	4:00
3.	"Bigroom Blitz" (Extended Mix)	4:14

== Charts ==
Chart performance for "Bigroom Blitz"
Chart (2014)	Peak position
Austria (Ö3 Austria Top 40)	63
Belgium (Ultratop 50 Wallonia)	90
France Airplay (SNEP)	20
France (SNEP)	79
Germany (GfK)	43
