= Concrete Heart =

Single by Vassy featuring Disco Fries
- Released: 15 March 2019
- Recorded: 2019
- Length: 3:02
- Label: KMV/Sony Red
- Songwriter: Vicky Karagiorgos
- Producers: Vicky Karagiorgos; Nick Ditri; Danny Danger

Vassy singles chronology
"Doomsday" (2018)	"Concrete Heart" (2019)	"Trouble" (2019)

"Concrete Heart" is a song recorded by Australian singer/songwriter Vassy, featuring American duo Disco Fries. The track became Vassy's sixth number-one single in the United States on Billboard's Dance Club Songs chart, reaching the summit in its June 8, 2019 issue, as well as her fourth top ten on the Dance/Mix Show Airplay chart, while it became the first top ten on both charts for Disco Fries.

== Background ==
In an interview with Billboard, Vassy described that

"Concrete Heart" is a very special record, dedicated to my father, who passed away 16 years ago. I really wanted to grow as an artist and focus more on a sound that's authentic to me. I felt a little vulnerable putting out the record, as it's a song about being afraid to get hurt, being afraid of rejection, of having the right to love whomever you want no matter who you are, having that equal opportunity. I didn't know how people would take it, so to see it get received so well inspires me to continue my artistry. As I always say, rejections are simply re-directions.

== Track listings ==
Digital download

1. "Concrete Heart" – 3:02

== Charts ==
=== Weekly charts ===
Chart (2019)	Peak position
US Hot Dance/Electronic Songs (Billboard)	23
US Dance Club Songs (Billboard)	1

=== Year-end charts ===
Chart (2019)	Position
US Dance Club Songs (Billboard)	12

== See also ==
- List of Billboard number-one dance songs of 2019
