= Cube Records =

English record label

- Founded: 1972
- Founder: David Platz
- Genre: Rock; Pop
- Country of origin: England

Cube Records is an English record label. It was launched on 26 May 1972 by independent music publisher David Platz, and was based at his UK offices for Essex Music.

== History ==
Platz had entered the arena of record production in the early 1960s, and having had a string of hits by licensing records to major labels (most Essex artists were released on EMI's Regal Zonophone), decided to start his own independent record label in 1970. With Malcolm Jones as label manager he formed Fly Records and tapped a rich vein of hits, with the Move, singles from T. Rex and John Kongos ("He's Gonna Step On You"), as well as hit albums, the most important being Electric Warrior, T. Rex's breakthrough number 1 album.

By mid 1972, Marc Bolan had left Fly Records to set up his own label imprint and Essex/Fly producer Tony Visconti had also left with Bolan, setting up his own Good Earth Productions. With new staff brought into the label, Platz decided to promote a new roster of artists and re-launch with a new label named Cube Records.

The headline of the press release issued by Malcolm Jones in May 1972 to communicate this development boldly stated "Essex puts Fly into Cube". A fact literally translated by the label's logo, which consisted of a fly within a wire-frame cube. According to the press release, Fly Records had been limited to operating in the UK, but Cube Records would be an international operation. In effect, Cube simply continued using Fly's catalogue numbering prefix, but with only one Fly artist, guitar virtuoso John Williams, remaining on the new label.

Cube's first singles came from Rod Thomas, whose rather insipid MOR/pop "Timothy Jones" failed to make any impact on the charts, and folk music stalwart Harvey Andrews, whose poignant single "In The Darkness"/"Soldier" (BUG 20) was subject to an 'unofficial' ban by the BBC.

Harvey's Cube album Writer Of Songs, was produced by long term Essex Music associate John Worth, and featured a stellar cast of musicians including Ralph McTell, Cozy Powell, Danny Thompson, David Pegg and Rick Wakeman.

Rodger Bain, producer of Black Sabbath and Budgie, produced an album for folk-rock outfit the JSD Band, which came replete with sleeve notes written by BBC Radio One DJ John Peel.

By July 1972, the label's ethos had moved too far from Jones' remit during the Fly days, and he left the label. The company's legacy recordings that had been released via FLY on its TOOFA series were also now brought into Cube, and by the end of the year Cube continued the TOOFA campaign with releases by T. Rex and Procol Harum, while all efforts were focussed on a brand new signing Joan Armatrading, an artist developed by Elton John producer Gus Dudgeon. Cube released Armatrading's first album, Whatever's for Us (with 11 of the songs co-written by Pam Nestor) in 1972.

Even with their biggest promotional campaign to date, the critical favour Armatrading's album garnered could not be replicated in sales. Their decision to credit the album almost solely to Joan Armatrading, giving little credit to Pam Nestor, caused not only the break-up of the duo but also caused Cube to lose Armatrading, who, upset and annoyed by the episode, negotiated her way out of her contract and signed for A&M instead. Further albums by Harvey Andrews, the JSD Band, Batti Mamzelle & Kestrel followed, and George Martin's production for John Williams' The Height Below – a sort of concept album – failed to sell in large numbers.

Hits like Jimmy Helms' mid 1970s pop/soul "Gonna Make You an Offer You Can't Refuse" and John Williams' film theme tune, "Cavatina (Theme from The Deer Hunter)", were only an occasionality, and after around 80 singles and 30 albums a new label makeover was ushered in.

As British pub rock lay the minimalist foundations for the oncoming punk rock scene, Cube became Electric Cube, albeit briefly, before its label manager Jeremy Thomas shelved the Cube imprint and established The Electric Record Company, whose Electric Records imprint became the home for new releases.

Cube Records soon ceased producing its own catalogue, opting to license to various catalogue companies over the years. Going full circle, Cube's recordings were incorporated into Onward Music, run by David Platz's son Simon Platz, and Cube's catalogue has returned to its initial home, Fly Records.

== See also ==
- List of record labels
