= David Platz =

David Platz (January 13, 1929 – May 20, 1994) was a German-born British music publisher and music business executive who established and led Essex Music, one of the major independent music publishing companies of the 1960s and 1970s. He also set up the Fly and Cube record labels.

== Biography ==
He was born in Hanover, Germany, and was sent to London, England, with his sister at the age of 10 to escape the Nazi persecution of the Jews. He lived in Neasden with guardians, and after leaving school began work as a messenger in Southern Music, a music publishing business in Denmark Street, Soho. He rose to become the manager of a section specializing in Latin American recordings, before leaving in 1955 to run Essex Music, Ltd., a British firm founded by American music publisher Howie Richmond.

The company quickly became successful, and Platz attracted a wide variety of musicians to use the agency, including the Rolling Stones, the Moody Blues, the Move, Procol Harum, the Who, Johnny Dankworth, Dudley Moore, Lonnie Donegan, David Bowie, and Marc Bolan. For each writer, Platz established a separate division of the company, with the artist maintaining direct involvement in its control. Black Sabbath's first contract had a clause signing over the band's publishing rights "in perpetuity" to Platz (and thereafter to his estate), which Ozzy Osbourne later estimated denied him over £100 million in revenue throughout his life.

He also helped finance and develop stage musicals, including working with Leslie Bricusse and Anthony Newley on Stop the World – I Want to Get Off in 1962 and The Roar of the Greasepaint – The Smell of the Crowd in 1964. Essex Music also worked with record producers and bands, licensing their records to major label subsidiaries such as Deram and Regal Zonophone, before Platz established the Fly label in 1970. The label had commercial success in the UK, notably with T. Rex, before the band left the label and Platz re-launched it in 1972 as Cube Records.

He was removed from this role after shifting the resources of Westminster Music Ltd, a publishing company jointly owned by himself and Richmond, into a company owned wholly by himself. He was ordered to pay back Richmond's interests over a million pounds. During the closing remarks of the trail, the judge declared Platz as "‘not a witness upon whose written or spoken word I could possibly rely without corroborative evidence. Certainly, as compared with Mr Richmond, he fell far short of any acceptable standard of evidence". Richmond's son, who had grown up seeing Platz as a father figure, later described him as a man motivated solely by greed.

Between 1973 and 1986, Platz was the publishing director of the Performing Right Society. He died from motor neurone disease in 1994, at the age of 65.
