= Disco Fries =

American DJ and music production team

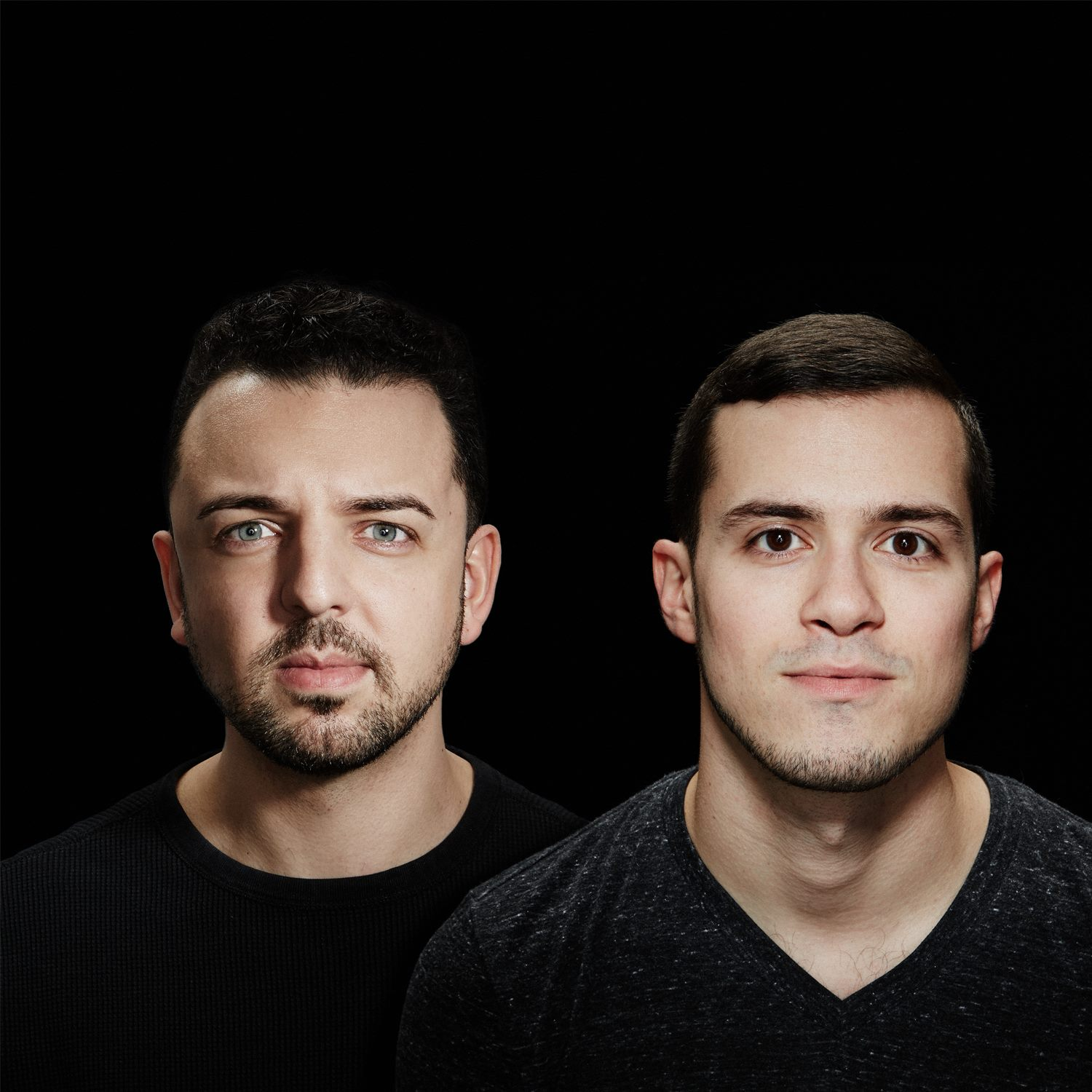
- Nicholas Ditri and Daniel Boselovic

Background information
- Origin: New York City, New York, U.S.
- Genres: Electro house; progressive house; future house
- Years active: 2009–present
- Labels: Musical Freedom; Ultra; Vicious; Atlantic; Strictly Rhythm; cr2; Armada; Spinnin'; Hollywood; Jive; RCA; Protocol
- Members: Nick Ditri; Danny Boselevic
- Website: discofriesmusic.com

Disco Fries is an American DJ and music production duo from New York consisting of Nick Ditri and Danny Boselovic.

== History ==
In late fall of 2004, Danny Boselovic and Nick Ditri met as roommates in their freshman year at Berklee College of Music in Boston. Nick grew up on hip-hop and New York-centric dance music and ran an independent record label. Danny was a trombone player and fan of Radiohead and technology. They started experimenting on music together in their freshman year.

The duo has hit the Hypem #1 spot multiple times with their releases on labels such as Cr2, Strictly Rhythm, OneLove, and Vicious Recordings. After recently being named one of VIBE Magazine "30 DJs to Watch in 2013", Disco Fries partnered with Novation to create a Max for Live plug-in dubbed "Konversate" for use with the Launchpad in their live sets. In late 2013, Disco Fries became a FabFilter Endorsed Artist.

In 2018, their single "U Make Me (Zack Martino & Disco Fries Remix)" peaked at #1 on SiriusXM's BPM.

In 2019, “Concrete Heart,” their collaboration with Vassy peaked at #1 on both Billboard's Dance Music Charts and Media Base Dance Radio Charts, and has tracked as the #11th most played dance song of the year. This song including 2 of their other singles this year, "Forever" and "Moonlight," are under consideration for nominations in the 62nd Grammy Awards. They've also had "Moonlight" and "Forever" in simultaneous rotation on several different SiriusXM channels, including BPM, Pitbull's Globalization, and their remix of Domenico's "Sirens" in rotation on Chill.

=== Collaboration ===
Upon his receipt of the DJ Mag and KLM DJ Legend Award, Tiesto released a free download where Disco Fries was featured called “iTrance." The Tiesto and Disco Fries collaboration first began as a rumor when an Instagram video emerged with the two acts working together in the studio. As of December 2013, "iTrance" has earned more than 500,000 plays on SoundCloud. In early 2014, Disco Fries were chosen by Tiësto and 7 Up to be one of their Bubbling UP DJs for the #7x7UP campaign.

The Disco Fries recently produced two tracks on Tiesto 'A Town Called Paradise,' both "Wasted" featuring Matthew Koma and "Shimmer" featuring Christian Burns (production and writing credit). “Wasted” went Gold as certified by the RIAA for digital sales in excess of 500,000 in the USA. They've also received co-write and composer credits on Krewella "Live For The Night" along with the members of Cash Cash.

=== Autonomous ===
Autonomous is the debut EP from Disco Fries. It was self-released on 6 April 2015 by Liftoff Recordings and was preceded by "Head In The Clouds" featuring 311 frontman Nick Hexum. Additional features on the release include Breathe Carolina, Raine Maida of Our Lady Peace and UK artist Hope Murphy. Autonomous entered the iTunes Dance Album Chart at number 76 and peaked Top 50. Upon its release, Autonomous received positive reviews from music critics ranging from Billboard and MTV to Dancing Astronaut and KROQ. Matt Medved of Billboard stated, "On the release's lead single, "Head in the Clouds," the producers buoy Hexum's upbeat verses and radio-ready chorus with a gentle blend of buoyant chord hits, tight percussion, and subtle vocoder refrains. It's a more unapologetically accessible sound than 311 ever struck, but the Fries succeed in setting Hexum's vocals within the electronic backdrop without it feeling too forced.". The acoustic version of "Head In The Clouds" premiered on Guitar World via Acoustic Nation. Regarding "All I Wanna" with Breathe Carolina, Rao Paoletta of MTV stated, "Disco Fries’ latest track will make you feel like you're at the club wherever you are, from Ibiza to the elliptical and have collaborated with electro-rockers Breathe Carolina to grace your eardrums with “All I Wanna.”. The Halogen Remix for "Born Ready" featuring Hope Murphy went #1 on Hype Machine.

=== Touring ===
In 2013, Disco Fries performed over 75 shows around the world. Notable gigs have included playing alongside Tiesto at Hakkasan in Las Vegas, Icona Pop and Krewella at Stage 48 in New York City for WKTU KTUphoria and Tommie Sunshine at the Amsterdam Dance Event in The Netherlands. The duo also completed bi-annual tours in Asia, Australia, Indonesia and Canada with a string of dates throughout mainland China, Hong Kong, Jakarta, Sydney, Perth, Toowoomba, Adelaide, Alberta, Ottawa, Saskatchewan, New Brunswick, Newfoundland and Labradour. On June 29, 2014 The Disco Fries played WKTU's Ktuphoria with Calvin Harris, Cash Cash, Ariana Grande, and Jennifer Lopez In early 2019, Disco Fries went on tour with Tritonal on their U & Me tour, while the second half of the year has seen them touring in support of their "Family Affair" single.

== Discography ==
=== Albums ===
2020

- Rehash, Vol. 2

=== Extended plays ===
2015

- Autonomous featuring 311 front man Nick Hexum, Breathe Carolina, Raine Maida of Our Lady Peace and UK artist Hope Murphy

2017

- DF

=== Singles ===
==== As lead artist ====
2011

- "Don't Look Back" (with Tommie Sunshine)
- "Killer" (with Clinton Sparks)

2012

- "Bass Off"
- "Don't Let Me Down" (featuring Niles Mason)
- "Born to Fly" (featuring Niles Mason)
- "Heartbeat" (featuring Jeremy Carr and Hyper Crush)
- "Party On" (featuring Honorebel)
- "Bad Boy" (with Tommie Sunshine and Loopers)

2013

- "Parachutes"
- "iTrance" (with Tiesto)
- "Lose It"
- "Bad Boy" (with Tommie Sunshine and Loopers)
- "Open Your Eyes (Revelation)"
- "Cool Without You" (with Tommie Sunshine featuring Kid Sister)

2014

- "Ramuh"
- "Follow Me" (featuring Gazzo & Jones)
- "The Light" (featuring Niko The Kid)
- "We Got the Sound" (featuring Big Nab)
- "Philtrum"
- "Love Me Right" (featuring Amba Tremain)

2015

- "We Are One" (with Kaaze featuring Danyka Nadeau)
- "Volume" (featuring Fatman Scoop)
- "Earthquake" (featuring Command Sisters)
- "Louder"
- "Head in the Clouds" (featuring Nick Hexum)

2016

- "Nutcracker Suite"
- "Forever" (vs. Vandalism and Tommie Sunshine)
- "Somebody Told Me" (featuring Chrissy Quadros)
- "Is It Over" (with Shanahan featuring Shy Martin)
- "Day by Day" (featuring Katt Rose)

2017

- "Side by Side"
- "Moving On" (featuring Great Good Fine Ok)
- "Reckless" (featuring Jared Lee)
- "We Are Family (UK Pride Anthem)" (with Reigns)
- "My World" (featuring Dee Roze)

2018

- "Apex"
- "Blue" (with Mimo featuring Jena Rose)
- "Turning Corners"
- "The Cut"
- "U Make Me" (featuring Rachel Castro)
- "Dance 2 Your Heartbeat" (with Tommie Sunshine and Wrongchilde featuring Sierra Kusterbeck)

2019

- "Part Time" (with Modern Machines and Lena Leon)
- "Family Affair"
- "Forever" (featuring Maline)
- "The End (Want It All)" (with Loax featuring Jaki Nelson)
- "Concrete Heart" (with Vassy) - Peaked at #1 on Billboard Dance Club Songs Chart and #1 on Media Base Dance Radio Chart. In consideration for a 62nd Grammy Nomination
- "Moving Mountains" (featuring Ollie Green)

2020

- "Give It Back" (with Giiants featuring Allison Park)
- "Forever Love" (with Bingo Players featuring Viiq)
- "Anybody"
- "Believer" (with Giiants)

2021

- "Up Til Light" (with Sm1lo)
- "Feel Again" (with Shanahan)
- "15 Minutes" (with Damon Sharpe)

2024

- "Our House" (with Fatman Scoop & Bingo Players)

2025

- "For a Star to Fall" (with Bingo Players & Boy Meets Girl)

==== As featured artist ====
2012

- Clinton Sparks (featuring Disco Fries and Pitbull) — "Watch You"

2015

- Runaground (featuring Disco Fries) — "Stars Come Out"

2018

- Lenay (featuring Zarah Bash and Disco Fries) — "La La Land"

=== Remixes ===
2020

- Sofi Tukker - "Fantasy" (Tommie Sunshine and Disco Fries Remix)
- Disco Fries and Giiant - "Believer" (VIP Remix)

2019

- Art Beatz featuring Fatman Scoop - "Cobra Dance" (Disco Fries Edit)
- Domenico - "Sirens" (Disco Fries Remix)
- Jes - "No One Else" (Disco Fries Remix)
- Post Malone - "Circles (Disco Fries Bootleg)"
- Janet Jackson - "All For You (Disco Fries Bootleg)"
- Axwell - "Nobody Else (Disco Fries Bootleg)"
- Chemical Brothers - "Got to Keep On (Disco Fries Bootleg)"

2018

- Tritonal featuring Lourdiz — "Love U Right" (Disco Fries Remix)
- Disco Fries - "U Make Me (Zack Martino & Disco Fries Remix)" (featuring Rachel Castro) - Peaked at #1 on SiriusXM

2017

- Selena Gomez featuring Gucci Mane — "Fetish" (Disco Fries Remix)

2015

- Morgan Page featuring Lissie — "Open Heart" (Disco Fries Remix)

2014

- Icona Pop — "Just Another Night" (Disco Fries Remix)
- Madison Avenue — "Don't Call Me Baby" (Tommie Sunshine and Disco Fries Remix)
- Vensun featuring Sylvia Tosun and David Vendetta — "The Dragon Flies" (Disco Fries Remix)
- Damien Anthony — "Sneak Attack" (Aylen Remix) (Disco Fries Edit)

2013

- Foxes — "Youth" (Disco Fries Remix)
- Mt Eden featuring Diva Ice — "Air Walker" (Disco Fries Remix)
- Neon Hitch featuring Tyga — "Gold" (Disco Fries Remix)
- Gregor Salto and Chuckie — "Toys Are Nuts 2013" (Tommie Sunshine and Disco Fries Remix)
- Sean Declase — "Invincible" (Tommie Sunshine and Disco Fries Remix)

2012

- Chris Brown featuring Pitbull — "International Love" (Clinton Sparks and Disco Fries Remix)
- Scissor Sisters — "Shady Love" (Tommie Sunshine and Disco Fries Remix)
- Flo Rida — "Good Feeling" (Disco Fries Remix)
- The Wonderland Journals featuring Renji — "Passenger" (Tommie Sunshine and Disco Fries Remix)
- Bombs Away and Seany B — "Get Stoopid" (Tommie Sunshine and Disco Fries Remix)
- Sharam Jey and Katrina Noorbergen — "Living Like I'm Dying" (Tommie Sunshine and Disco Fries Remix)
- Oh Snap!! — "Mister Ouzo" (Disco Fries Remix)
- Hotflush and Matthew Charles — "Sweet Harlem" (Tommie Sunshine and Disco Fries Remix)
- Ronski Speed and Jes — "Can't Stop" (Disco Fries Remix)

2011

- Katy Perry — "The One That Got Away" (Tommie Sunshine and Disco Fries Remix)"
- Mysto & Pizzi and Jonny Rose — "Where Is Love" (Disco Fries Remix)
- Thomas Sagstad, Mike Hawkins and Pablo Oliveros featuring Gregory Boyd — "Just Be You" (Disco Fries Remix)
- Cobra Starship featuring Sabi — "You Make Me Feel..." (Disco Fries Remix)
- Britney Spears — "I Wanna Go" (Disco Fries Remix)
- Girls' Generation featuring Snoop Dogg — "The Boys" (Clinton Sparks and Disco Fries Remix)
- Britney Spears — "Hold It Against Me" (Disco Fries Mix)

2010

- Far East Movement featuring The Cataracs and Dev — "Like a G6" (Disco Fries Remix)
- Usher featuring will.i.am — "OMG" (Disco Fries Extended Mix)
- Selena Gomez & The Scene — "Naturally" (Disco Fries Remix)
- Armand Van Helden and Steve Aoki — "BRRRAT!" (Disco Fries Remix)

2009

- Flo Rida featuring Nelly Furtado — "Jump" (Disco Fries Mix)

=== Fries & Shine ===
Fries & Shine is a collaboration between Disco Fries and NY producer Tommie Sunshine, a 3-hour podcast for Scion Radio.

==== Singles ====
2013

- "Melbourne Bounce" (with Orkestrated featuring Big Nab)

== Liftoff Recordings ==
In late 2013, Disco Fries launched Liftoff Recordings, a home for new Disco Fries releases as well as for up and coming artists.

=== Releases ===
- LFT001 Gazzo — The Cage EP (Featuring Farewell Luna)
- LFT002 Damien Anthony — Sneak Attack
- LFT003 Aire Atlantica and Burban Gold - 51sick
- LFT004 Live City — Bambada
- LFT005 Disco Fries - Murika
- LFT006 Klaud, AR2R, Funky Fool - Godzilla
- LFT007 Kastra - Dolla Billz
- LFT008 Live City - Shot Calla
- LFT009 Various Artists - Sneak Attack and Godzilla The Remixes
- LFT010 Fyor and Sex Panther - Spade
- LFT011 Disco Fries (Featuring Big Nab) - We Got The Sound
- LFT012 Gazzo — Inspire Remixes (Featuring Farewell Luna)
- LFT013 Damien Anthony and Grand & Warren - Tres EP
- LFT014 Aylen - Kill Room
- LFT015 Disco Fries - Ramuh
- LFT016 Landis & Crespo (featuring Fatman Scoop) - Lose Control
- LFT001MA Disco Fries - Autonomous EP featuring 311 front man Nick Hexum, Breathe Carolina, Raine Maida of Our Lady Peace and UK artist Hope Murphy
- LFT018 Disco Fries - Ramuh (Nitro Fun Remix)
- LFT019 Disco Fries (featuring Nick Hexum) - Head In The Clouds
- LFT020 Dirty Ducks (Featuring Big Nab) - Let's Rock
- LFT022 Disco Fries (featuring Nick Hexum) - Head In The Clouds The Remixes
- LFT023 Disco Fries, Breathe Carolina - All I Wanna The Remixes
- LFT024 Landis, Disco Fries - Trumped
- LFT025 RUNAGROUND, Disco Fries - Stars Come Out
- LFT026 Andrea Rullo - Ensemble
- LFT027 Disco Fries & Kaaze (featuring Danyka Nadeau) - We Are One
- LFT028 RUNAGROUND, Disco Fries - Stars Come Out (Bvrnout Remix)
- LFT029 RUNAGROUND, Disco Fries - Stars Come Out (YOU&ME Remix)
- LFT030 Louis Vivet (featuring Mister Blonde) - Last Call
- LFT031 Corrupt - Deep Love
- LFT032 Eric Sharp (featuring Zhao) - The Thirst
- LFT033 Disco Fries (featuring Chrissy Quadros) - Somebody Told Me
- LFT034 Louis Vivet (featuring Kirsten Collins) - Pulse
- LFT035 Nordic Trac ft. Alyssa Oliver - Never Let You Go
- LFT036 Disco Fries - Nutcracker Suite
- LFT037 Kue - Girlfriend
- LFT038 Kastra - Everything You Want
- LFT039 Iceleak feat. Karl Michael - Danger
- LFT040 Disco Fries & Reins - We Are Family (Official UK Pride Anthem)
- LFT041 Eric Sharp (featuring Zhao) - The Thirst (Lliam Taylor & Latroit Remix)
- LFT042 Louis Vivet - Pulse + Last Call (Remixes)
- LFT043 RUNAGROUND, Disco Fries - Stars Come Out (Anki Remix)
- LFT044 Andrea Rullo, Sickbeatz - Lights
- LFT045 MATS, Rvmor - Anywhere I Am
- LFT046 Peep This, Monkey Twerk - Club Work
- LFT047 Fahjah feat. Command Sisters - The Wolf
- LFT048 Tom Rogue & Ryke ft. Kris Kiss - Keep It Moving
- LFT049 Fahjah ft. Rhea Raj - Run
- LFT050 Tom Collins - Dusk
- LFT051 Tom Collins - Mandala
- LFT052 Bleach Baby - This Is For You
- LFT053 Iceleak feat. Karl Michael - Danger (Remixes)
- LFT054 Peep This, Monkey Twerk - Club Work (Remixes)
- LFT055 Corrupt, E-V - One Night
- LFT056 Bleach Baby - Be So Good
- LFT057 KØBA - The Dumb EP
- LFT058 Bleach Baby - Turn Around
- LFT059 Fahjah ft. Rhea Raj - Flames
- LFT060 Art Beatz ft. Nana The Writer - Boyfriend
- LFT061 Tommie Sunshine & Disco Fries X Wrongchilde ft. Sierra Kuebrick - Dance 2 Your Heartbeat
- LFT062 Corrupt - Inside This Dream / Parallel
- LFT063 Thomas Anthony ft. White Gypsy - Tom's Diner
- LFT064 Disco Fries - The Cut
- LFT065 Kriss Norman - the Sign
- LFT066 RUNAGROUND - So Good
- LFT067 Thomas Anthony - My Love
- LFT068 D:Tune feat. Briony - Back To You
- LFT069 MIMO - All Of Your Love
- LFT070 DJ Drew - Ponte A Bailar
- LFT071 ManyFew - My House
- LFT072 Art Beatz, Fatman Scoop - Cobra Dance
- LFT073 Disco Fries - Apex
- LFT074 Aurean feat. Linney - Call To Me
- LFT075 Bleach Baby, Reigns - Turn Around (Proper Tings Remix)
- LFT076 Bleach Baby, Reigns - Turn Around (Färsk Remix)
- LFT077 Bleach Baby, Reigns - Turn Around (Babert Remix)
- LFT078 FOUNDRS - Meteorite
- LFT079 Disco Fries & LoaX ft. Jaki Nelson - The End (Want It All)
- LFT080 Andreas One - R U Ready
- LFT081 MIMO - Moments
- LFT082 Corrupt & MIMO - What You Need
- LFT083 Fahjah - Yue
- LFT084 Thomasian feat. Lola Rhodes - I Got You
- LFT085 KØBA - WHOA!
- LFT086 Sebastian Park - Astro Boogie
- LFT087 Fahjah - Black
- LFT088 KØBA - Hype The Game
- LFT089 Art Beatz, Fatman Scoop, Disco Fries - Cobra Dance (Disco Fries Edit)
- LFT090 Corrupt - BYFTB
- LFT091 Ryan Coss - Forever
