= Music for a Big Night Out =

Studio album by Scooter
- Released: 2 November 2012
- Recorded: 2012
- Studio: Sheffield Underground Studios (Hamburg, Germany)
- Length: 43:33; 62:21 (Deluxe edition)
- Label: Sheffield Tunes
- Producer: Scooter

Scooter chronology
The Big Mash Up (2011)	Music for a Big Night Out (2012)	20 Years of Hardcore (2013)

Singles from Music for a Big Night Out
- 1. "4 AM" Released: 7 September 2012; 2. "Army of Hardcore" Released: 2 November 2012

Professional ratings
Review scores
Source	Rating
Random.Access	7.5/10

Music for a Big Night Out is the sixteenth studio album by German hard dance band Scooter. The album was released on 2 November 2012, preceded by the first single "4 AM" on 7 September 2012. The second single "Army of Hardcore" was released on the same day as the album. It is the last studio album featuring Rick J. Jordan, who left in 2014 after being with the band since the beginning in 1993.

== Track listing ==
- All MC lyrics written by H.P. Baxxter a.k.a. "Bass Junkie".

No.	Title	Writer(s)	Length
1.	"Full Moon"	H.P. Baxxter; Rick J. Jordan; Michael Simon; Jens Thele; Achim Jannsen	1:50
2.	"I'm a Raver, Baby"	Beck Campbell; Carl Stephenson	3:16
3.	"Army of Hardcore"	Massimiliano Monopoli; Jeroen Streunding	2:57
4.	"4 AM"	Beverley Craven; Baxxter; Jordan; Simon; Thele	3:16
5.	"No Way to Hide"	Prince Rogers Nelson; Stephanie Nicks	3:22
6.	"What Time Is Love?"	James Francis Cauty; William Ernest Drummond	3:10
7.	"Overdose (Frazy)"	Andrej Prilipp; Baxxter; Jordan; Simon; Thele	3:03
8.	"Talk About Your Life"	Mike Oldfield	3:25
9.	"I Wish I Was"	Tom Gilbert; Sandi Thom; Alex Christensen; Baxxter; Jordan; Simon; Thele; Marcel Jerome Gialelés	3:25
10.	"Black Betty"	Huddie Ledbetter	3:34
11.	"Too Much Silence"	Baxxter; Jordan; Simon; Thele	5:38
12.	"Last Hippie Standing"	Baxxter; Jordan; Simon; Thele	6:37

iTunes Deluxe edition bonus tracks
No.	Title	Length
13.	"Army of Hardcore (Extended Club Mix)"	6:05
14.	"4 A.M. (Picco Remix)"	5:29
15.	"4 A.M. (Clubstar UK Mix)"	3:25
16.	"4 A.M. (Music Video)"	3:49

Editions

- A limited edition version of the album features a special T-shirt, which is not available in a regular store.

== Credits and personnel ==
Credits adapted from Music for a Big Night Out liner notes.

- Scooter – producer, performer, programming
- H.P. Baxxter – MC lyrics
- Rick J. Jordan – mixer, engineer
- Michael Simon – mixer, engineer
- Marcel Jerome Gialelés (Jerome) – mixer, engineer
- Achim Jannsen (Eric Chase) – mixer, engineer
- Jaye Marshall – vocals (track 4, 5, 9)
- Nikk – vocals (track 8)

== Charts ==
Chart (2012)	Peak position
Austrian Albums (Ö3 Austria)	37
Czech Albums (ČNS IFPI)	27
German Albums (Offizielle Top 100)	10
Swiss Albums (Schweizer Hitparade)	47

== Release history ==
List of release dates, showing country, record label, format, and edition
Region	Date	Label	Format	Edition
Germany	2 November 2012	Sheffield Tunes	CD	Standard
Germany	2 November 2012	Sheffield Tunes	CD + T-shirt	Limited
Germany	2 November 2012	Sheffield Tunes	digital download	Deluxe (inc. bonus tracks) (iTunes only)
Germany	2 November 2012	Sheffield Tunes	digital download	Standard
Italy	2 November 2012	Kontor Italia	digital download	Standard
Poland	22 January 2013	Uniwersal Music Poland	CD	Standard

== Notes ==
- "Full Moon" is similar to "Invasion (ASOT 550 Anthem)" by W&W
- "I'm a Raver, Baby" is based on "Loser" by Beck.
- "Army of Hardcore" samples lyrics from "Army of Hardcore" by Neophyte and The Stunned Guys.
- "4 AM" samples lyrics from "Promise Me" by Beverly Craven, as well as the melody from Otto Knows track "Million Voices".
- "No Way to Hide" samples lyrics from "Stand Back" by Stevie Nicks.
- "What Time is Love?" is a cover of the song of the same name by The KLF.
- "Overdose (Frazy)" is based on "Frazy" by Synapsenkitzler, and samples the vocals from "I Wanna be a Hippie" by Technohead.
- "Talk About Your Life" is a cover of the song of the same name by Mike Oldfield.
- "I Wish I Was" is based on "I Wish I Was a Punk Rocker (With Flowers in My Hair)" by Sandi Thom; the bassline is taken from "The Box" by Ummet Ozcan.
- "Black Betty" is a cover of the folk song of the same name.
- "Too Much Silence" samples the vocals of Veela from "Lights" by System.
