= Speak (Londonbeat album) =

Studio album by Londonbeat
- Released: 26 September 1988
- Label: Anxious, RCA
- Producer: Willy M (William Henshall)

Londonbeat chronology
Speak (1988)	In the Blood (1990)

Speak is the debut album by the British-American dance-pop band Londonbeat, released in 1988. It includes the singles "There's a Beat Going On" (No. 88 in the United Kingdom, No. 19 in the Netherlands, No. 35 in New Zealand), "9 A.M. (The Comfort Zone)" (UK No. 19, Netherlands No. 33) and "Failing in Love Again" (UK No. 60, Netherlands No. 11).

== Track listing ==
All tracks written by William Henshall, Jimmy Helms, George Chandler and Jimmy Chambers.

No.	Title	Length
1.	"There's a Beat Going On..."	4:03
2.	"Beat Patrol"	3:28
3.	"Failing in Love Again"	2:30
4.	"9am (The Comfort Zone)"	4:13
5.	"Drop!!"	3:22
6.	"Nice Here When It's Nice"	4:26
7.	"Get Wet"	4:29
8.	"One Blink"	4:14
9.	"Talent on the Make"	3:16
10.	"Please Baby (Can I Have My Heart Back Please?)"	2:47
11.	"Katey"	5:19
12.	"Jerk"	3:12
13.	"Bribe the Bride"	3:52
14.	"There's a Deep House Going On" (12")	8:32

Note

- Tracks 12–14 on CD only.

== Personnel ==
Adapted from the album's liner notes.

=== Musicians ===
- Jimmy Helms, Jimmy "Chirpy" Chambers, George Chandler – vocals
- Willy M (William Henshall) – all instruments
- Gary James – drums (track 11)
- Luís Jardim – drums (tracks 2, 9)
- Michael Kamen – string arrangement on "9AM (The Comfort Zone)"
- Ollie Marland – keyboards, piano (tracks 7, 11)
- Doc Savage – drums
- David A. Stewart – slide dobro (track 11)
- John G. Turnbull – guitar solo, fuzz guitar solo (tracks 7, 11)
- Paul Waller – drums (tracks 3, 8)

=== Production ===
- Willy M – producer, original engineer, mixer
- Ian Caple – engineer, extra track laying
- Fred Defaye – engineer, extra track laying and mix engineer, string overdub engineer
- Ben Fenner – mixer, mix engineer
- Robert Goldstein – photography
- Doc Savage – extra programming, mixer
- Mark "Spike" Stent – engineer, mix engineer
- Paul Waller – mixer
