= Doomsday (Vassy and Lodato song) =

Single by Vassy and Lodato
- Released: 19 July 2018
- Recorded: 2018
- Length: 2:52
- Label: KMV/Sony Red
- Songwriter(s): Vicky Karagiorgos
- Producer(s): Vicky Karagiorgos; Salvadore Lodato

Vassy singles chronology
"Lost" (2017)	"Doomsday" (2018)	"Concrete Heart" (2019)

"Doomsday" is a song recorded by Australian singer-songwriter Vassy, featuring American musician Salvatore Lodato. The single is Vassy's first song released through her new Sony Music-distributed imprint KMV (the initials being the first letters in her birth name in reverse and a reference to her side name "KissMyVassy").

In an interview with EDM.com, Vassy said that the inspiration for the track was drawn from her mantra of inspiring fans to break through all obstacles that are thrown in their way: "I wanted to create a dark and moody anthemic ballad about facing our inner demons. To inspire listeners to get through the struggle whatever it is. You're standing on the edge for dear life, but you're finding a way to keep going."

The track became Vassy's fifth number one single, and the second for Lodato, in the United States on Billboard's Dance Club Songs chart, reaching the summit in its October 6, 2018 issue.

== Track listings ==
Digital download

1. "Doomsday" – 2:52

== Charts ==
Chart (2018)	Peak position
US Hot Dance/Electronic Songs (Billboard)	27
US Dance Club Songs (Billboard)	1
