= Olympic Runners =

British funk band

- Origin: United Kingdom
- Genres: Funk, disco
- Years active: 1974–1979
- Labels: London, Polydor, RCA, Chipping Norton
- Past members: Mike Vernon; Pete Wingfield; George Chandler; Glen LeFleur; Joe Jammer; DeLisle Harper

The Olympic Runners were a 1970s British funk band, put together by record producer Mike Vernon who also played percussion, and fronted by singer George Chandler. They also included multi-instrumentalist Pete Wingfield, and had a number of hit singles in both the US and the UK.

== History ==
In 1973, Mike Vernon, a British record producer and founder of Blue Horizon, put together a group of session musicians to play on an album with blues musician Jimmy Dawkins, to be recorded at Olympic Studios in London. The musicians included keyboard player and vocalist Pete Wingfield, singer George Chandler, guitarist Joe Jammer, bassist DeLisle Harper, and drummer Glen LeFleur, of whom Chandler, Harper and LeFleur were also members of jazz-funk band Gonzalez. When Dawkins' arrival was delayed, the musicians recorded a funk track in the spare studio time. Vernon then sold the track, "Put The Music Where Your Mouth Is", credited to the Olympic Runners, to London Records in New York City, and in 1974 it became a hit on the US R&B Chart, reaching no. 72.

Following its success, the musicians recorded an album, including the track "Grab It" which also made the R&B charts. They recorded a second album, Out in Front, in 1975, shortly before Wingfield had his own solo hit single, "Eighteen with a Bullet". A third album, Don't Let Up, soon followed, along with a succession of singles. The 1976 album Hot to Trot has been cited as their finest. Wingfield described the recording process:

"Barry Hammond the engineer would always keep a 2-track quarter-inch tape running so as to catch us jamming between takes – then we'd use that jamming as the basis for the next track. It was painless, we made album after album that way, it only took a couple of weeks out of the year, and we were selling records! For the first few years the band were completely anonymous – people assumed we were a US act..."

Their commercial success diminished in the US at the same time as it grew in the UK, and their biggest successes in the UK charts came in 1978–79, with the hit singles "Get It While You Can" and "Sir Dancealot". In 1979 they also performed the theme tune for the film The Bitch, starring Joan Collins, which gave them a third UK top 40 hit.

The group split up in 1979. Vernon and Wingfield later joined Rocky Sharpe and the Replays, and the other band members continued as session musicians. Several Olympic Runners tracks have been sampled by later artists, including Everlast.

== Discography ==
=== Albums ===
Year	Album	Label	US R&B
1974	Put the Music Where Your Mouth Is	London	—
1975	Out in Front	London	49
1976	Don't Let Up	London	—
1977	Hot to Trot	Chipping Norton	—
1978	Keeping It Up	RCA	—
1978	Puttin' It on Ya	Polydor	—
1979	It's a Bitch	Polydor	—
"—" denotes releases that did not chart.

=== Singles ===
Year	Title	Peak chart positions		
Year	Title	US R&B	US Dance	UK
1974	"Sproutin' Out"	―	―	―
1974	"Grab It"	73	―	―
1974	"Put the Music Where Your Mouth Is" / "Do It Over"	72	―	―
1975	"Party Time Is Here to Stay"	97	―	―
1975	"Drag It Over Here"	92	―	―
1975	"Dump the Bump"	―	―	―
1976	"Keep It Up"	―	27	―
1976	"Personal Thang"	―	―	―
1977	"Say What You Wanna But It Sure Is Funky"	―	―	―
1977	"Love on My Mind"	―	―	―
1978	"God Bless You"	―	―	―
1978	"Whatever It Takes"	―	―	61
1978	"Get It While You Can"	―	―	35
1978	"Sir Dancealot"	―	―	35
1979	"The Bitch"	―	85	37
"—" denotes releases that did not chart or were not released in that territory.

== See also ==
- List of disco artists (S-Z)
- List of funk musicians
- List of performers on Top of the Pops
