= Salvatore Lodato =

Lodato (DJ/Producer)
- Also known as: LODATO
- Born: 7 July 1987 (age 38)
- Occupations: DJ, producer, musician and remixer
- Labels: Atlantic, Overdrive Productions, Spinnin
- Website: www.djlodato.com

Salvatore Lodato (born 7 July 1987), better known by his stage name LODATO, is an American DJ, musician, and remixer. He is best known for his 2019 original single "HOME", which reached #1 on the U.S. Dance Radio Chart for three weeks, #1 on BPM's "Top 20 Count Down" (SiriusXM) for four consecutive weeks and #1 on The Billboard Dance/ Mixshow Airplay Chart. In May 2020, LODATO'S original single "Good" followed the found its way to #1 in the U.S. on Dance Radio. LODATO's Remix of Dua Lipa's "Break My Heart" was added to rotation on all the major U.S. Dance Radio Stations and hit #1 in North America on iHearts RT30 countdown. In late 2020 he signed a record deal with Spinnin records, who recognized him as one of the pioneers of the Dance/POP Genre.

== Discography ==
=== Singles ===
Title	Year	Release label
Older	2016	Overdrive Productions
One Way Out	2016	Overdrive Productions
Breathe Again	2017	Overdrive Productions
Lay Low	2018	Overdrive Productions
Home	2019	Overdrive Productions
Doomsday	2018	SONY
Good	2020	Spinnin Records
I Blame You	2020	Overdrive
Neon Lights	2021	Spinnin Records

=== Remixes ===
- Clean Bandit (ft. Zara Larsson) - Symphony (LODATO & Joseph Duveen Remix)
- Clean Bandit (ft. Sean Paul & Anne-Marie) - Rockabye (LODATO & Joseph Duveen Remix)
- Vassy - Nothing To Lose (LODATO Remix)
- Raquel Castro - Feel Good Castle (LODATO Bootleg)
- Twenty One Pilots - Heathens (LODATO Remix feat. Joseph Duveen & Jaclyn Walker)
- Anne-Marie - Alarm (LODATO Remix)
- Ben Platt & Dear Evan Hansen - Waving Through A Window (LODATO & Joseph Duveen Remix)
- Tiësto - On My Way (LODATO & Sikduo Remix)
- X Ambassadors - Unsteady (LODATO & Joseph Duveen Remix)
- Vicetone (ft. Jonny Rose) - Stars (LODATO Remix)

=== Jason Derulo ===	Cono	(LODATO Remix)
=== Galantis (Feat OneRepublic) ===	Bones	(LODATO Remix)
=== Lady Gaga & Bradley Cooper === "Shallow" topped the Dance Club Songs chart on December 15, 2018, aided by remixes from DJ Aron, Nesco and Lodato, among many others. It became Gaga's 15th leader on the tally, ranking her among artists with the most chart toppers.	Shallow	(LODATO Remix)
=== Break My Heart ===	DuaLipa	(LODATO Remix)

== Awards and recognition ==
- Remix of the year 2017, Miami Music Week
- 2018: Vassy x LODATO – Doomsday #1 Billboard Dance/Club Songs
- 2019: LODATO – HOME - #1 Billboard Dance/Mix Show Airplay
- 2019: LODATO – HOME - #1 Dance Radio Airplay Chart (Mediabase) (3 consecutive weeks)
- 2019: LODATO – HOME - #1 Sirius XM (BPM) (4 Consecutive weeks)
- 2019: LODATO – GOOD - #1 Dance Radio Airplay Chart (Mediabase)
- 2020: Dua Lipa – Break My Heart (LODATO Remix) #1 iHeart Remix Rt30 Chart
