= Vassy (singer) =

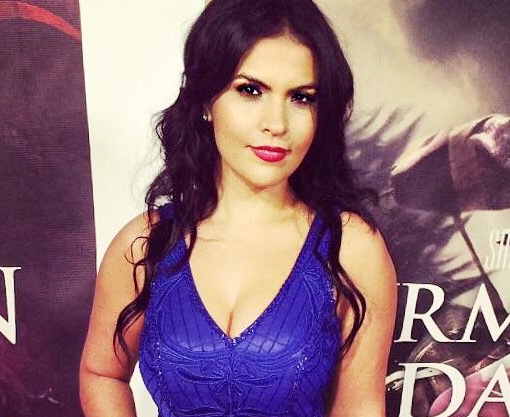
- Vassy at the Egyptian Theatre in Los Angeles in 2014.

Background information
- Born: Vasiliki Karagiorgos; 18 February 1983 (age 43); Darwin, Northern Territory, Australia
- Origin: Australia
- Genres: Pop; dance; EDM; indie pop
- Occupations: Singer; songwriter; record producer; actress
- Years active: 2003–present
- Labels: KissMyVASSY; Ultra; Universal; Warner Bros.; Musical Freedom; Atlantic; ABC
- Website: vassymusic.com

Vasiliki Karagiorgos (Greek: Βασιλική Καραγιώργος, Vasilikí Karagiórgos; born 18 February 1983), known as Vassy, is an Australian singer, songwriter, record producer and actress. She is the first woman to win an Icon Award at the 2023 Electronic Dance Music Awards. She was supposed to represent the United States in Intervision 2025, but withdrew before the competition began.

== Biography ==
Vassy was born in Darwin, Northern Territory to Greek immigrant parents. Her parents hail from Kozani and Grevena. In the early 2010s she moved to Los Angeles, United States to pursue an international career. In 2022, she moved back to Australia.

== In popular culture ==
Her song was featured in the Tina Fey film Admission, The trailer for the Disney's Oscar-winning film Frozen, and in the campaign Gok Loves for Target Australia. Vassy's songs have also been featured in EA Games, Nickelodeon, Skechers, Victoria's Secret, Pepsi commercials, and the trailer for the Oscar-winning film Disney's Frozen and hit TV shows such as ABC's Grey's Anatomy.

=== Withdrawal from Intervision 2025 ===
On September 20, 2025, she was supposed to represent the United States in the international song contest Intervision 2025 in Moscow. However shortly before her performance, it was announced that she wouldn't be participating in the contest because of "unprecented political pressure from the Australian government". The hosts of the contest expressed regret over her dismissal; however, the voting juror representing the US, Joe Lynn Turner, stayed until the end of the musical contest.

== Philanthropy ==
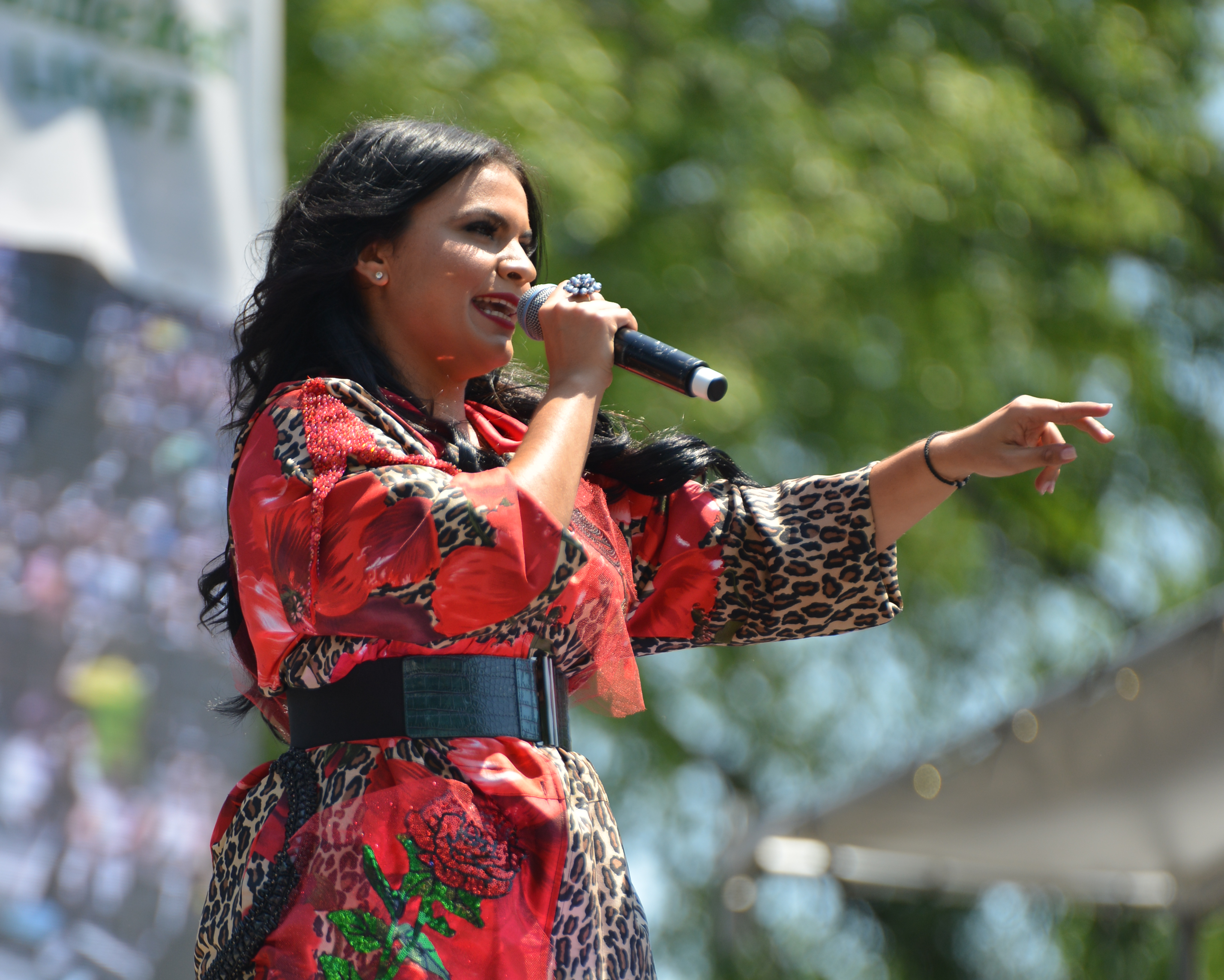
Vassy at the 2017 Capital Pride Festival in Washington, DC

Vassy is an LGBT advocate, being an ambassador for the NOH8 Campaign, an organization that promotes LGBT rights. She mentioned that she is LGBT ally because her close friends and family are part of that community. She performed at the Capital Pride Festival. She is also a spokesperson for Green IT. She also volunteers and teaches music workshops at AVIVA in Los Angeles.

== Discography ==
=== Albums ===
List of albums, with release date and label shown
Title	Album details
My Affection	Released: 2005; Label: Fly Music (5101102192); Format: CD
Beautiful Day	Released: May 2012; Label: Control (85657725); Formats: CD, Digital download
We Are Young	Released: 2015; Label: Formats: CD, Digital download

=== Extended plays ===
List of EPs, with release date and label shown
Title	EP details
The Acoustics	Released: June 2011; Label: Kiss My Vassy
Christmas EP	Released: 10 December 2018; Formats: Digital download, streaming

=== Singles ===
==== As lead artist ====
List of singles as lead artist, with selected chart positions, showing year released and album name
Title	Year	Peak chart positions			Album
Title	Year	US Dance	US Elec.	LTU Air.	Album
"I Can See Clearly Now" (with Jazibel)	2003	—	—	*	Non-album single
"Cover You in Kisses"	2003	—	—	*	My Affection
"Get Busy" (with Katalyst)	2005	—	—	*	My Affection
"Wanna Fly" (featuring Mozim)	2005	—	—	*	My Affection
"Loverman"	2005	—	—	*	My Affection
"Kick My Ass"	2005	—	—	*	My Affection
"History"	2010	—	—	*	Non-album single
"Desire"	2011	—	—	*	Beautiful Day
"Could This Be Love"	2012	—	—	*	Beautiful Day
"We Are Young"	2012	1	—	*	Beautiful Day
"Mad"	2014	4	27	*	Non-album singles
"Hustlin'" (featuring Crazibiza and Dave Audé)	2014	1	23	*	Non-album singles
"T.U.T.P. (Turn Up the Party)" (with DirtyFreqs)	2016	6	27	—	Non-album singles
"Nothing to Lose"	2017	1	29	—	Non-album singles
"Lost" (with Afrojack featuring Oliver Rosa)	2017	1	24	—	Non-album singles
"Somebody New" (with Sultan & Shepard)	2018	—	—	—	Non-album singles
"Doomsday" (with Lodato)	2018	1	29	—	Non-album singles
"Concrete Heart" (with Disco Fries)	2019	1	23	—	Non-album singles
"Stand Out"	2019	—	—	—	Non-album singles
"Trouble"	2019	2	19	—	Non-album singles
"Fly"	2019	—	—	—	Non-album singles
"Blink"	2020	—	—	—	Non-album singles
"What's Going On"	2020	—	—	—	Non-album singles
"Oxygen" (with Outgang & Two Worlds Apart)	2020	—	—	—	Non-album singles
"Have Yourself a Merry Little Christmas"	2020	—	—	—	Non-album singles
"Blinding Lights"	2021	—	—	—	Non-album singles
"Chase" (with Bonka)	2021	—	—	—	Non-album singles
"Pieces" (with Bingo Players & Disco Fries)	2022	—	—	—	Non-album singles
"Our Moment"	2023	—	—	—	Non-album singles
"Supreme"	2023	—	—	—	Non-album singles
"Krazy"	2023	—	—	—	Non-album singles
"Off Switch"	2024	—	—	—	Non-album singles
"Midnight"	2024	—	—	—	Non-album singles
"Beg"	2025	—	—	—	Non-album singles
"Hazy"	2025	—	—	—	Non-album singles
"Secrets"	2025	—	—	—	Non-album singles
"Needed You"	2025	—	—	—	Non-album singles
"Star"	2026	—	—	—	Non-album singles
"On Me" (with Mind Electric)	2026	—	—	66	Non-album singles
"Day N Night" (with Bust-R)	2026	—	—	—	
"Dirty Martini"	2026	—	—	—	
"—" denotes a recording that did not chart or was not released.

==== As featured artist ====
List of singles as featured artist, with selected chart positions and certifications, showing year released and album name
Title	Year	Peak chart positions										Certifications	Album
Title	Year	AUS	BEL (WA)	FRA	GER	NLD	RUS Air.	SWE	SWI	UK	US	Certifications	Album
"Bad" (David Guetta & Showtek featuring Vassy)	2014	5	6	6	19	13	111	2	28	22	113	ARIA: 2× Platinum; BPI: Platinum; GLF: 5× Platinum; RIAA: Platinum	Listen
"Today" (Scooter and Vassy)	2014	—	—	—	75	—	150	—	—	—	—		The Fifth Chapter
"Secrets" (Tiësto & KSHMR featuring Vassy)	2015	—	31	27	—	21	39	24	31	—	—	BPI: Silver; BVMI: Gold; RIAA: Gold	Club Life: Volume Four New York City
"Satisfied" (Showtek featuring Vassy)	2015	—	—	—	—	—	—	—	—	—	—		Non-album single
"Radiate" (Scooter and Vassy)	2015	—	58	—	—	—	77	—	—	—	—		The Fifth Chapter
"I Should Have Said" (Playmen featuring Vassy)	2016	—	—	—	—	—	—	—	—	—	—		Non-album singles
"Cracked Wall" (with Florian Picasso)	2016	—	—	—	—	—	—	—	—	—	—		Non-album singles
"Faster Than a Bullet" (with Tiësto)	2017	—	—	—	—	—	—	—	—	—	—		Non-album singles
"Sexy Ballad" (Ruthie Duress featuring Vassy)	2024	—	—	—	—	—	—	—	—	—	—		Non-album singles
"—" denotes a recording that did not chart or was not released in that territory.

==== Other appearances ====
- "Spotlight" (Victor Magan featuring Vassy and Juan Magan)
- "Miss Automatic" (Mark Angelo and Vassy featuring Epsilon) (No. 84 Greek Digital Songs)
- "Tokyo Style" (Future Boyz featuring Dave Audé and Vassy)
- "Burn" (Scooter and Vassy, 2016, on Ace)

== Awards and nominations ==
Year	Award	Category	Work	Result
2017	WDM Radio Awards	Best Electronic Vocalist	Herself	Won

== See also ==
- List of number-one dance hits (United States)
- List of artists who reached number one on the US Dance chart
