= Thee Attacks =

Danish rock band

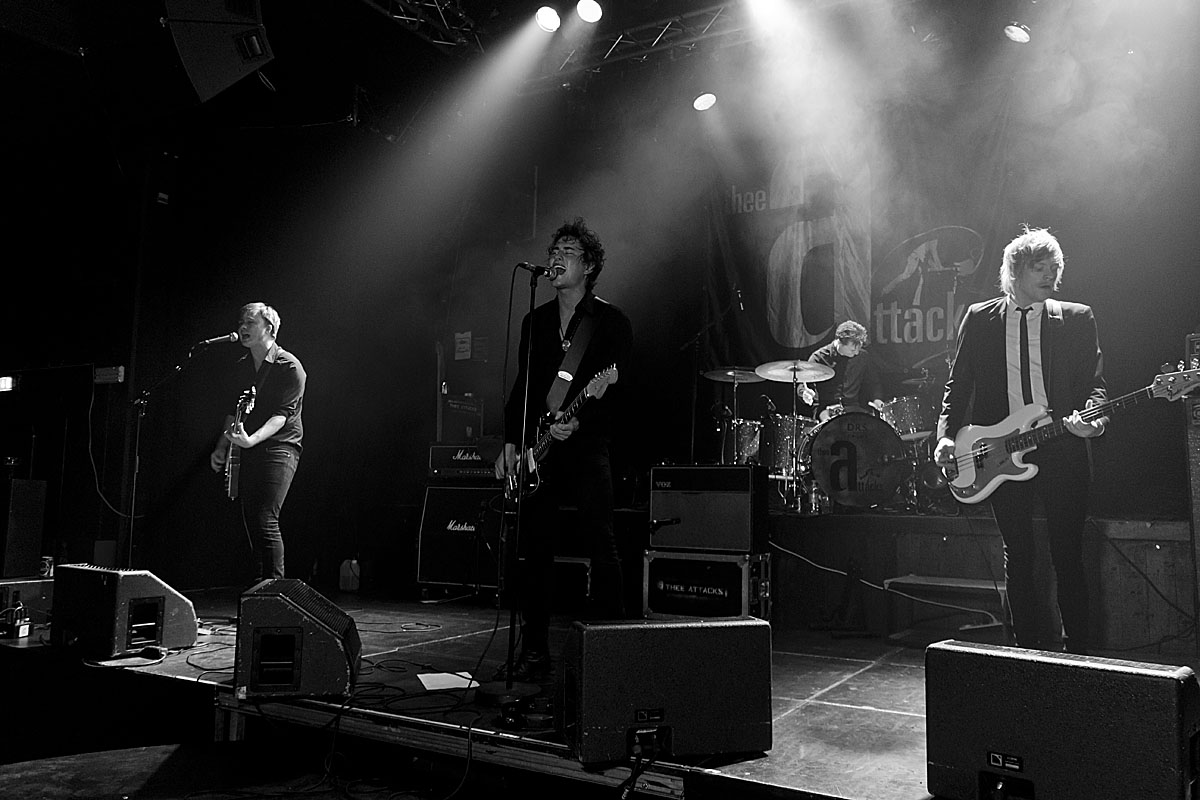

Background information
- Origin: Aalborg, Denmark
- Genres: Garage rock, indie rock
- Years active: 2007–2014
- Labels: Crunchy Frog Records
- Members: Jimmy Attack; Terry Attack; Johnny Attack; Ritchie Attack
- Website: http://www.theeattacks.dk/

Thee Attacks was a rock band from Aalborg in the northern part of Denmark who since relocated to Copenhagen. Terry, Johnny and Jimmy were the founding members and in 2008, Ritchie joined.

Thee Attacks gained a significant reputation with the raw energy they expressed through their live shows. Producer Liam Watson produced their debut album That's Mister Attack to You in 2010 and also their second album Dirty Sheets released on the label Crunchy Frog in 2012.

In 2014, Thee Attacks announced that they decided to break up due to musical differences.

== Music style ==
The main music feature of Thee Attacks is a mixture of 1960s-'70s garage, rock'n'roll, proto-punk and classic rock which is influenced by such classic bands as the Who, the Rolling Stones, Velvet Underground, Led Zeppelin, the Doors and Slade.

== Band members ==
- Jimmy Attack – vocals, guitar (2007–2014)
- Terry Attack – guitar, organ, backing vocals (2007–2014)
- Johnny Attack – bass guitar (2007–2014)
- Ritchie Attack – drums, percussion (2008–2014)

== Discography ==
=== Studio albums ===
- That's Mister Attack to You (2010)
- Dirty Sheets (2012)

=== Compilations ===
- Strikes Back (2016)

=== Singles ===
- "Love in Disguise" (2010)
- "Let the Snow Fall" (2010) (non-album single)
- "I Know What I Want" (2011) (non-album single)
- "So Cold" (2012)
