= A Better Love =

1990 single by Londonbeat

Single by Londonbeat

from the album In the Blood
- B-side: "She Said She Loves Me"; "K.I.S.S."
- Released: 12 November 1990
- Genre: Dance-rock; dance-pop
- Length: 3:59
- Label: Anxious; RCA
- Songwriters: Jimmy Chambers; Jimmy Helms; George Chandler; Ian Green; William Henshall
- Producer: Martyn Phillips

Londonbeat singles chronology
"I've Been Thinking About You" (1990)	"A Better Love" (1990)	"It's in the Blood" (1990)

Music video
- "A Better Love" on YouTube

"A Better Love" is a song by British-American dance-pop band Londonbeat, released on 12 November 1990 by Anxious and RCA Records as the second single from the group's second studio album, In the Blood (1990). Produced by Martyn Phillips, it was the follow-up to their international hit "I've Been Thinking About You". "A Better Love" reached the top 20 in several countries, including Austria and Canada, where it entered the top 10; it was the 41st-most-successful song of 1991 in the latter country. On the US Billboard Hot 100, the single reached number 18, while on the UK Singles Chart, it peaked at number 24.

== Critical reception ==
Stephen Thomas Erlewine from AllMusic described the song as a "enjoyable" slice of early-'90s "soulful, tuneful dance-pop". Larry Flick from Billboard magazine wrote that it "demonstrates [the] act's versatility and is draped with anthemic drum beats and spacious guitar slides." Steve Morse from Boston Globe felt the group shows some "intoxicating dance rhythms" in songs like "A Better Love". Pan-European magazine Music & Media stated that here, the band "is once again a display of vocal craftsmanship", describing the song as "up-tempo, yet mildly moody and chartbound." Selina Webb from Music Week said that "this is bound to be two in a row for Anxious's most fruitful signing." She added that "the wholesome harmonies are in fine form and this is easily as strong as 'I've Been Thinking About You'."

== Track listings ==
- UK 7-inch single
1. "A Better Love" – 3:59
2. "K.I.S.S." – 3:35
- German maxi-CD
1. "A Better Love" – 3:59
2. "She Said She Loves Me" – 4:14
3. "K.I.S.S." – 3:35
4. "A Better Love" (extended) – 6:25

== Charts ==
=== Weekly charts ===
Weekly chart performance for "A Better Love"
Chart (1990–1991)	Peak position
Australia (ARIA)	25
Austria (Ö3 Austria Top 40)	10
Belgium (Ultratop 50 Flanders)	13
Canada Top Singles (RPM)	3
Canada Adult Contemporary (RPM)	4
Europe (Eurochart Hot 100)	41
Europe (European Hit Radio)	17
Finland (Suomen virallinen lista)	26
Germany (GfK)	13
Ireland (IRMA)	11
Israel (Israeli Singles Chart)	5
Italy (Musica e dischi)	11
Luxembourg (Radio Luxembourg)	16
Netherlands (Dutch Top 40)	14
Netherlands (Single Top 100)	14
New Zealand (Recorded Music NZ)	33
Switzerland (Schweizer Hitparade)	12
UK Singles (Official Charts)	23
UK Airplay (Music Week)	5
US Billboard Hot 100	18
US Adult Contemporary (Billboard)	37
US Cash Box Top 100	12

=== Year-end charts ===
Year-end chart performance for "A Better Love"
Chart (1991)	Position
Canada Top Singles (RPM)	41
Canada Adult Contemporary (RPM)	37
Europe (European Hit Radio)	88
Germany (Media Control)	56
Italy (Musica e dischi)	77

== Release history ==
Release dates and formats for "A Better Love"
Region	Date	Format(s)	Label(s)	Ref.
United Kingdom	12 November 1990	7-inch vinyl; 12-inch vinyl; CD; cassette	Anxious; RCA	
United Kingdom	17 December 1990	7-inch remix vinyl	Anxious; RCA	
Australia	25 February 1991	7-inch vinyl; 12-inch vinyl; cassette	Anxious; RCA	
Japan	21 August 1991	Mini-CD	Anxious; RCA	
