= So Cold (Mahalo, DLMT, and Lily Denning song) =

Single by Mahalo and DLMT featuring Lily Denning
- Released: 2019
- Recorded: 2019
- Genre: EDM; Brazilian bass
- Length: 3:16
- Label: Armada Records
- Songwriters: Nick Jay; Dan Balamut; Lily Denning; Max Billion; Markus Videsater
- Producers: Nick Jay; Dan Balamut

"So Cold" is a song that was co-produced, co-written and recorded by Honolulu native and Los Angeles–based producer Mahalo (a.k.a. Nick Jay) and Toronto-based producer DLMT (real name Dan Balamut), featuring English singer Lily Denning. The Electronic/House-infused track became their first number one on Billboard's Dance/Mix Show Airplay Chart in August 2019.

== Background ==
In an interview for Billboard's "Dance Chart Upstarts" profile, both Jay and Balamut recalled how the song came about that would lead to their partnership, "We met at Miami Music Week (in 2018) and hit it off over some Cuban food; a sound start to any relationship. We really dug each other's styles and wanted to make something that balances our two sounds to create something that resonates with people. For us, 'So Cold' was the perfect representation of that.

As for the single itself, "The record is really about shutting yourself off from the standards in today's society and staying true to what you believe in. It's too easy to get caught up in the rat race of social media and what you are 'supposed to be doing.' according to everyone else, but it's more important than ever to shut out the noise and pursue your own purpose."

== Track listing ==
Single

1. So Cold – 3:16
