= Londonbeat =

British dance-pop band

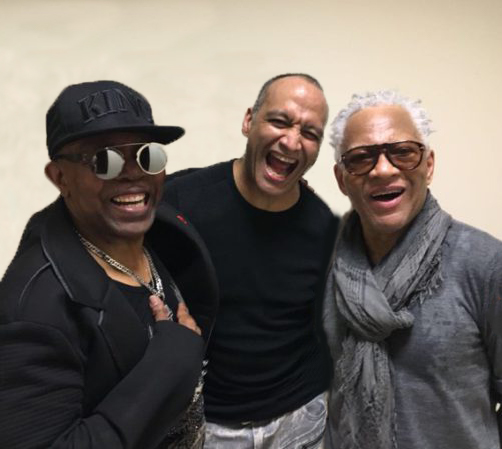
- Londonbeat in 2018

Background information
- Origin: London, England
- Genres: Dance-pop; EDM
- Works: Discography
- Years active: 1988–present
- Labels: Anxious; Radioactive
- Spinoff of: Central Line
- Members: Jimmy Helms; Jimmy Chambers; Charles Pierre
- Past members: George Chandler; William Henshall; Marc Goldschmitz; Myles Kayne
- Website: londonbeat-official.com

Londonbeat are a British dance-pop band who scored a number of pop and dance hits in the early 1990s. They consist of vocalists Jimmy Helms, Jimmy Chambers, and Charles Pierre. Former members include multi-instrumentalist William Henshall, George Chandler, Marc Goldschmitz, and Myles Kayne. As of 2026, the band has released six studio albums and numerous compilations.

== History ==
Formed in England's capital city, Londonbeat's career took off with the song "There's a Beat Going On", from their 1988 debut album, Speak. The song peaked on the UK chart at number 88. The track "9 A.M (The Comfort Zone)", from the same record, subsequently became a modest success in the UK, rising to number 19. Londonbeat are best known for their 1990 single "I've Been Thinking About You", from their second album, In the Blood, released the same year. After capturing the number 2 spot in the UK in September 1990, the song hit number one on the Billboard Hot 100 and the Hot Dance Music/Club Play charts in February 1991. Their follow-up single, "A Better Love", became a Billboard Top-20 hit.

The band issued the album Harmony in 1992 and followed it two years later with Londonbeat, which spawned the single "Come Back", bringing them back to the top of the dance charts.

In 1995, Londonbeat entered the UK heats of the Eurovision Song Contest with their non-album track "I'm Just Your Puppet on a ... (String)". However, they were not selected to enter the main contest (losing out to rap group Love City Groove), and the single stalled at number 55 on the UK Singles Chart.

Between 1997 and 1999, Jimmy Helms, Charles Pierre, and Tony Blaze performed as New Londonbeat and released three singles, including a re-recorded version of their classic hit "I've Been Thinking About You".

In 2003, Londonbeat reformed under a new lineup and signed to the German record label Coconut. An album called Back in the Hi-Life was released and featured re-recordings of "A Better Love" and "I've Been Thinking About You". The band issued Gravity in 2004, and in 2019, they published the retrospective 30 Years, which included two original tracks as well as several previously unreleased songs and remixes.

== Other projects ==
Helms has had a successful solo career and sang radio jingles for Radio Hallam and Hereward Radio in the UK.

George Chandler is a founding member and former frontman of the band Olympic Runners.

Chambers and Chandler were backing vocalists for Paul Young's 1985 album, The Secret of Association. Helms, Chandler, and Chambers were backing vocalists on the Deacon Blue 1987 single "When Will You Make My Telephone Ring", and they sang on the tracks "Good Thing", "Tell Me What", and "It's OK (It's Alright)" from the Fine Young Cannibals' 1989 album, The Raw & the Cooked. Chandler, Chambers, and Helms were backing vocalists on the 1988 Godley & Creme album, Goodbye Blue Sky.

== Band members ==
Current

- Jimmy Helms
- Jimmy Chambers
- Charles Pierre

Past

- William Henshall (credited as Willy M)
- George Chandler
- Marc Goldschmitz
- Myles Kayne

== Lineups ==
Jimmy Helms is the only member present in every Londonbeat lineup. Jimmy Chambers is also present in every lineup, with the exception of 1999, when the band was known as New Londonbeat, due to his absence.

1988–1992

- Jimmy Helms
- Jimmy Chambers
- George Chandler
- Willy M

1994–1995

- Jimmy Helms
- Jimmy Chambers
- Willy M

1997–1999

- Jimmy Helms
- Charles Pierre
- Tony Blaze

2003–2004

- Jimmy Helms
- Jimmy Chambers
- Myles Kayne
- Marc Goldschmitz

2004–2018

- Jimmy Helms
- Jimmy Chambers
- Myles Kayne

2018–present

- Jimmy Helms
- Jimmy Chambers
- Charles Pierre

== Discography ==
- Speak (1988)
- In the Blood (1990)
- Harmony (1992)
- Londonbeat (1994)
- Back in the Hi-Life (2003)
- Gravity (2004)

== See also ==
- List of number-one hits (United States)
- List of artists who reached number one on the Hot 100 (U.S.)
- List of number-one dance hits (United States)
- List of artists who reached number one on the U.S. Dance chart
