= Jimmy Helms =

American singer-songwriter (born 1941)

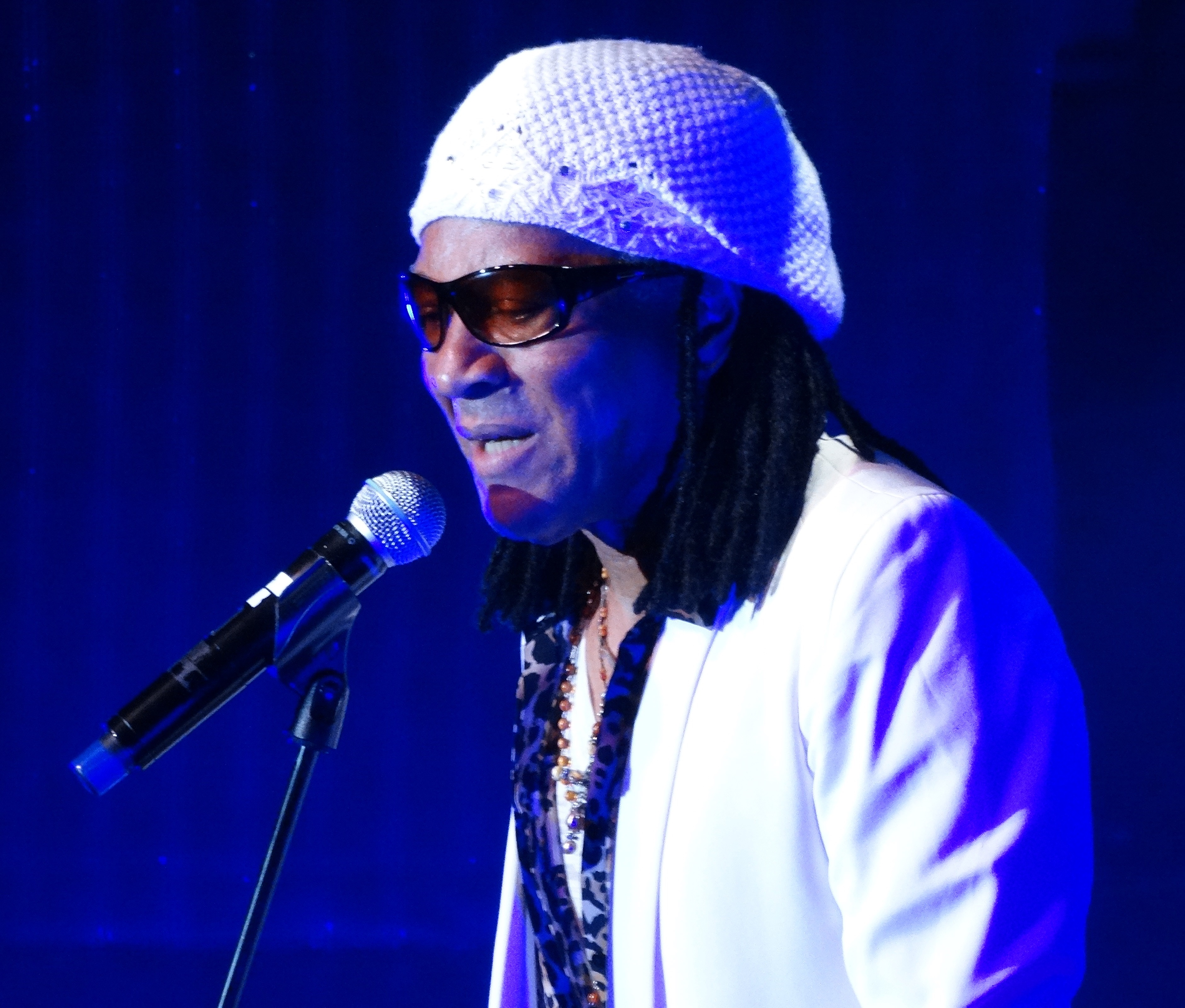
- Helms performing in Belgium, 2014

Background information
- Born: James D. Helms; September 27, 1941 (age 85); Florida, U.S.
- Genres: Pop; dance-pop; soul; funk; rhythm and blues
- Occupations: Singer; songwriter
- Years active: 1963–present
- Labels: London; Pye; Fly
- Member of: Londonbeat
- Formerly of: Deacon Blue; Madness
- Website: jimmyhelms.co.uk

James D. Helms (born September 27, 1941) is an American singer and songwriter, long based in the United Kingdom. He is known as the lead vocalist of the British dance-pop group Londonbeat, but also had solo hits such as "Gonna Make You an Offer You Can't Refuse", as well as prolific session work.

== Early years ==
Helms was born in Florida. His grandfather was a Black Seminole and a preacher. Helms discovered music when his aunt gave the family a radio, and went on to play trumpet in the school band. After high school, he moved to Columbus, Ohio. He released his first single, “Daddy! Daddy!” on Forest Records in 1962. He played with the Carl Sally band and moved to Boston, where he worked as a session guitarist. He joined the US Army and played trumpet in the Fort Jackson Army Band.

After 1970, Helms began to spend more time pursuing a music career in the UK. He released many singles on labels such as Cube, Capitol, Philips, and Pye. None of these releases made much of an impact, but they helped keep Helms in the spotlight.

== Career ==
In Boston in 1970, Helms appeared in the Broadway musical Hair, in which he played the character Hud. Reviewing his performance, Billboard Magazine noted: "He projects a personality that is vital."

Helms signed to the UK’s Fly Records in 1972, and released "So Long Love" on its Cube Records subsidiary. However, he is best known for his No. 8 UK hit single, "Gonna Make You an Offer You Can't Refuse" in 1973. Later releases such as "I'll Take Good Care of You" and "Jack Horner's Holiday" did not repeat the commercial success. "Gonna Make You an Offer You Can't Refuse" was written and produced by John Worth.

Helms sang Elmer Bernstein and Don Black's title song for the 1974 adventure film Gold, starring Roger Moore. In 1974 he worked on Roger Glover's concept album The Butterfly Ball and the Grasshopper's Feast, performing "Waiting." The album also featured Ronnie James Dio, Glenn Hughes, David Coverdale, Tony Ashton and John Lawton. In 1976, Helms performed on two songs for Eddie Hardin's Wizard's Convention album ("Loose Ends" and "She's a Woman.")

Helms released a single and soundtrack album for the film Black Joy with producer Biddu in 1977.

=== 1980s and 1990s ===
Helms worked on the soundtrack of the 1985 movie Water, and performed some songs on the album release of the 1980s stage musical Time. During this period, he worked as a session musician with Topper Headon, Deacon Blue, Madness, and other groups.

Helms was often heard singing vocals on many radio jingles on Independent Local Radio stations in the United Kingdom. His voice was particularly prominent on the Alfasound produced ident packages for Pennine Radio, Radio Hallam and the Yorkshire Radio Network. Helms also voiced/sang the part of the Cilician pirate Isoricus on the track 'Trust Me', on Jeff Wayne's Musical Version of Spartacus released in 1992.

=== Londonbeat ===
In 1988 Helms, along with band members George Chandler (ex-Olympic Runners), Jimmy Chambers, and William Henshall formed the band Londonbeat. The band reached initial success in the Netherlands, but quickly found a broader audience. The group's hits include "I've Been Thinking About You", "A Better Love", and "9 A.M (The Comfort Zone)", all written by William Henshall. The song "I've Been Thinking About You", written by Helms, produced his highest-ever profile, reaching No. 2 on the UK Singles Chart in September 1990, and No. 1 on the US Billboard Hot 100 in February 1991. It stayed on this chart for nearly five months.

Londonbeat went on hiatus in 1995, but in 2003, it re-formed as New Londonbeat with a line-up consisting of Jimmy Helms, Jimmy Chambers, Myles Kayne and Marc Goldschmitz. Signed to the German record label Coconut, they released an album called Back in the Hi-Life, which featured re-recordings of "A Better Love", "I've Been Thinking About You", and with new tracks added.

== Solo discography ==
=== Albums ===
- Jimmy Helms (Oracle Records, 1969)
- Gonna Make You an Offer! (Cube Records, 1975)
- Songs I Sing (Pye Records, 1975)

=== Singles ===
Year	Title	Peak chart positions	
Year	Title	US R&B	UK
1969	"If You Let Me"	―	―
1972	"So Long Love"	―	―
1973	"Gonna Make You an Offer You Can't Refuse"	93	8
1973	"Jack Horner's Holiday"	―	51
1973	"I'll Take Good Care of You"	―	―
1974	"When Can Brown Begin"	―	―
1974	"Ragtime Girl"	―	―
1974	"Gold"	―	―
1975	"Don't Pull Your Love"	―	―
1977	"Black Joy"	―	―
1977	"Putting It Down (To the Way I Feel About You)"	―	―
"—" denotes releases that did not chart or were not released in that territory.

== See also ==
- List of one-hit wonders on the UK singles chart
- Lists of Billboard number-one singles
