= Kshmr discography =

- Studio albums: 2
- EPs: 3
- Singles: 65
- Remixes: 23

Niles Hollowell-Dhar (born October 6, 1988), better known by his stage name Kshmr (pronounced "Kashmir" and stylized in all caps), is an American DJ, record producer and musician from California.

== Studio albums ==
Title	Details
Harmonica Andromeda	Released: March 19, 2021; Label: Spinnin' / Dharma Worldwide; Format: Digital download, streaming, vinyl
KARAM	Released: November 3, 2023; Label: Mass Appeal India / Dharma Worldwide; Format: Digital download, streaming

== Extended plays ==
Title	Details
Paradesi	Released: July 7, 2015; Label: Self-released; Format: Streaming; ———: Re-released: August 30, 2019; Label: Dharma Worldwide / Spinnin'; Format: Digital download
The Lion Across The Field	Released: May 13, 2016; Label: Spinnin'; Format: Digital download
Materia	Released: August 4, 2017; Label: Dharma Worldwide / Spinnin'; Format: Digital download

== Singles ==
=== As lead artist ===
List of singles as lead artist, with selected chart positions, showing year released and album name
Title	Year	Peak chart positions							Album
Title	Year	AUT	BEL	FRA	NLD	SWE	SWI	US Dance	Album
"Megalodon"	2014	—	—	—	—	—	—	—	Non-album singles
"No Heroes" (with Firebeatz featuring Luciana)	2014	—	—	—	—	—	—	—	Non-album singles
"Burn" (with DallasK)	2014	—	—	—	—	—	—	—	Non-album singles
"Karate" (with R3hab)	2014	—	78	84	—	—	—	—	Non-album singles
"Dead Mans Hand"	2015	—	—	—	—	—	—	—	Non-album singles
"Secrets" (with Tiësto featuring Vassy)	2015	55	31	27	21	24	31	15	Club Life Vol. 4
"Jammu"	2015	—	—	—	—	—	—	—	Non-album singles
"Lazer Love" (with Vaksi featuring Francisca Hall)	2015	—	—	—	—	—	—	—	Non-album singles
"Imaginate" (with Dzeko & Torres)	2015	—	—	—	—	—	—	—	Non-album singles
"Memories" (with Bassjackers featuring Sirah)	2015	—	—	—	—	—	—	—	Non-album singles
"Heaven" (with Shaun Frank featuring Delaney Jane)	2015	—	71	—	—	—	—	—	Non-album singles
"Strong" (with R3hab)	2015	—	78	—	—	—	—	—	Non-album singles
"Bazaar" (with Marnik)	2015	—	—	—	—	—	—	—	Non-album singles
"Touch" (with Felix Snow featuring Madi)	2016	—	—	—	—	—	—	—	The Lion Across the Field EP
"Wildcard" (featuring Sidnie Tipton)	2016	—	—	160	—	—	—	—	The Lion Across the Field EP
"Dharma" (with Headhunterz)	2016	—	—	—	—	—	—	—	Non-album singles
"Invisible Children" (with Tigerlily)	2016	—	—	178	—	—	—	—	Non-album singles
"Voices" (with Will Sparks)	2016	—	—	—	—	—	—	—	Non-album singles
"Extreme" (with Bassjackers featuring Sidnie Tipton)	2016	—	—	—	—	—	—	—	Non-album singles
"The Spook Returns" (with B3nte and Badjack)	2016	—	—	—	—	—	—	—	Non-album singles
"Mandala" (with Marnik featuring Mitika)	2016	—	—	—	—	—	—	—	Non-album singles
"Back to Me" (with Crossnaders featuring Micky Blue)	2017	—	—	—	—	—	—	—	Non-album singles
"Harder" (with Tiësto featuring Talay Riley)	2017	—	—	—	—	—	—	—	Non-album singles
"Festival of Lights" (with Maurice West)	2017	—	—	—	—	—	—	—	Materia EP
"Kolkata" (with JDG and Mariana BO)	2017	—	—	—	—	—	—	—	Materia EP
"The Serpent" (with Snails)	2017	—	—	—	—	—	—	—	Materia EP
"Divination" (with No Mondays)	2017	—	—	—	—	—	—	—	Materia EP
"Power" (with Hardwell)	2017	—	—	—	—	—	—	—	Hardwell Presents Revealed - Vol. 8
"Underwater" (featuring Sonu Nigam)	2017	—	—	—	—	—	—	—	Non-album singles
"Islands" (with R3hab)	2017	—	—	—	—	—	—	—	Non-album singles
"Shiva" (with Marnik featuring The Golden Army)	2017	—	—	—	—	—	—	—	Non-album singles
"House of Cards" (featuring Sidnie Tipton)	2018	—	—	—	—	—	—	—	Non-album singles
"Carry Me Home" (featuring Jake Reese)	2018	—	—	—	—	62	—	—	Non-album singles
"Opa" (with Dimitri Vegas & Like Mike)	2018	—	—	—	—	—	—	—	Tomorrowland 2018
"Neverland" (with 7 Skies)	2018	—	—	—	—	—	—	—	Non-album singles
"Good Vibes Soldier" (featuring Head Quattaz)	2018	—	—	—	—	—	—	—	Non-album singles
"Magic"	2018	—	—	—	—	—	—	—	Non-album singles
"No Regrets" (with Yves V featuring Krewella)	2019	—	—	—	—	—	—	—	Non-album singles
"Devil Inside Me" (with KAAZE featuring Karra)	2019	—	—	—	—	—	—	—	Dreamchild
"The People" (with Timmy Trumpet)	2019	—	—	—	—	—	—	—	Dharma: Sounds of Summer
"Lies" (with B3RROR featuring Luciana)	2019	—	—	—	—	—	—	—	Dharma: Sounds of Summer
"My Best Life" (featuring Mike Waters)	2019	—	—	—	—	—	—	—	Non-album singles
"Bombay Dreams" (with Lost Stories featuring Kavita Seth)	2019	—	—	—	—	—	—	—	Non-album singles
"Do Bad Well" (featuring Nevve)	2019	—	—	—	—	—	—	—	Non-album singles
"Alone" (with Marnik featuring Anjulie and Jeffrey Jey)	2019	—	—	—	—	—	—	—	Non-album singles
"Over And Out" (with Hard Lights featuring Charlott Boss)	2020	—	—	—	—	—	—	—	Non-album singles
"Bruk It Down" (with Sak Noel featuring Txtheway)	2020	—	—	—	—	—	—	—	Non-album singles
"Voices" (with Brooks)	2020	—	—	—	—	—	—	—	Dharma: Sounds of Summer, Vol. 2
"The Prayer" (with Timmy Trumpet featuring Zafrir)	2020	—	—	—	—	—	—	—	Non-album singles
"Casual" (as Dreamz featuring Nevve)	2020	—	—	—	—	—	—	—	Non-album singles
"Kids" (with Stefy De Cicco featuring Mkla)	2020	—	—	—	—	—	—	—	Non-album singles
"Let Me Go" (with Alok and Mkla)	2020	—	—	—	—	—	—	—	Non-album singles
"Scare Me" (with LUM!X and Gabry Ponte featuring Karra)	2020	—	—	—	—	—	—	—	Non-album singles
"Anywhere You Wanna Go" (as Dreamz featuring Karra)	2020	—	—	—	—	—	—	—	Non-album singles
"One More Round" (with Jeremy Oceans)	2020	—	—	—	—	—	—	—	Non-album singles
"The World We Left Behind" (featuring Karra)	2021	—	—	—	—	—	—	—	Harmonica Andromeda
"Around The World" (featuring Noumenn)	2021	—	—	—	—	—	—	—	Harmonica Andromeda
"Echo" (with Armaan Malik and Eric Nam)	2021	—	—	—	—	—	—	—	Non-album single
"You Don't Need To Ask" (featuring Tzar)	2021	—	—	—	—	—	—	—	Harmonica Andromeda (Deluxe)
"Ready To Love"	2021	—	—	—	—	—	—	—	Non-album singles
"Winners Anthem" (with Zafrir)	2021	—	—	—	—	—	—	—	Non-album singles
"Reunion" (with Dimitri Vegas & Like Mike and Alok featuring Zafrir)	2021	—	—	—	—	—	—	—	Non-album singles
"Over You" (featuring Lovespeake)	2021	—	—	—	—	—	—	—	Non-album singles
"Close Your Eyes" (with Tungevaag)	2021	—	—	—	—	—	—	—	Non-album singles
"Lion Heart" (with Divine and Lit Killah featuring Jeremy Oceans and Karra)	2022	—	—	—	—	—	—	—	Non-album singles
"Ininna Tora" (with Timmy Trumpet and Mildenhaus)	2022	—	—	—	—	—	—	—	Non-album singles
"Major Lazer" (with Quarterhead)	2023	—	—	—	—	—	—	—	Non-album singles
"Haath Varthi" (with MC Stan)	2023	—	—	—	—	—	—	—	KARAM
"Bhussi" (with Seedhe Maut)	2023	—	—	—	—	—	—	—	KARAM
"Legacy" (with Raftaar)	2023	—	—	—	—	—	—	—	KARAM
"Zero After Zero" (with KR$NA and Talay Riley)	2023	—	—	—	—	—	—	—	KARAM
"Pretender" (with Sam Feldt)	2025	—	—	—	—	—	—	—	
"Ultra Love" (with Jason Ross and Brienna Grace)	2026	_	_	_	_	_	_	_	
"—" denotes a recording that did not chart or was not released in that territory.

=== As featured artist ===
List of singles as featured artist, showing year released and album name
Title	Year	Album
"Toca" (Carnage featuring Timmy Trumpet and Kshmr)	2015	Papi Gordo
"Lucky Chances" (Bali Bandits featuring Kshmr)	2019	Non-album singles

== Royalty-free songs ==
List of songs available for free download
Year	Title
2014	"¡Baila!"
2014	"Omnislash"
2014	"Dogs" (featuring Luciana)
2014	"Leviathan"
2014	"Kashmir"
2015	"Clouds" (with Dillon Francis featuring Becky G)
2015	"The Spook" (featuring BassKillers and B3nte)
2015	"Lazer Love" (with Vaski featuring Francisca Hall)
2015	"Imaginate" (with Dzeko & Torres)
2015	"It Follows" (KSHMR Halloween Special) (with Disasterpeace)
2015	"Deeper" (with ZAXX)
2016	"Voices" (with Will Sparks)
2016	"Creep" (Radiohead cover)
2017	"Strange Lands"
2018	"Doonka" (with Mr.Black)

== Songwriting and production credits ==
List of tracks composed and produced by KSHMR
Title	Year	Artist(s)	Album
"Body Down (Inspector Gadget)"	2016	MORTEN	Non-album single
"Trouble" (featuring Micky Blue)	2019	Tiësto, 7 Skies	Together
"Maldad"	2020	Steve Aoki, Maluma	Neon Future IV
"No Evil"	2020	KARRA	Non-album single

== Remixes ==
Title	Year	Original artist(s)
"Virus (How About Now)" (Kshmr Remix)	2015	Martin Garrix and MOTi
"Virus (How About Now)" (Kshmr Remix) (VIP House Version)	2015	Martin Garrix and MOTi
"Runaway" (Kshmr Remix)	2015	Galantis
"It Feels" (Kshmr Remix)	2015	Nervo
"Jammu" (Paradesi Version)	2015	Kshmr
"Kashmir" (Paradesi Version)	2015	Kshmr
"Savior" (Reez and Kshmr Remix)	2015	Bassjackers
"The Launch" (Kshmr Remix)	2015	DJ Jean
"Secrets" (Future House Edit)	2015	Tiësto and Kshmr (featuring Vassy)
"For a Better Day" (Kshmr Remix)	2015	Avicii
"Heaven" (Kshmr Remix)	2015	Shaun Frank and Kshmr ((featuring Delaney Jane)
"Feels" (Kshmr Remix)	2015	Kiiara
"Get Up" (Kshmr Remix)	2016	R3hab and Ciara
"Touch" (VIP Remix)	2016	Kshmr and Felix Snow (featuring Madi)
"Wildcard" (VIP Remix)	2016	Kshmr (featuring Sidnie Tipton)
"Invisible Children" (Kshmr Remix)	2016	Kshmr and Tigerlily
"Two Minds" (Kshmr and Crossnaders Remix)	2017	Nero
"Game of Thrones Theme" (Kshmr and The Golden Army Remix)	2017	Ramin Djawadi
"Elysium" [Gladiator] (KSHMR and Mark Sixma Remix)	2018	Hans Zimmer
"Doonka" (Psy Edit)	2018	Kshmr and Mr.Black
"My Best Life" (Club Mix)	2019	Kshmr (featuring Mike Waters)
"Ahimsa" (Kshmr Remix)	2019	U2 and A. R. Rahman
"My Bad" (Kshmr Edit)	2020	Shaun and Advanced (featuring Julie Bergan)
"Close Your Eyes" (VIP Mix)	2021	Kshmr and Tungevaag
