= Moti discography =

Discography of Dutch DJ Moti

This is the discography of Dutch DJ Moti.

== Extended plays ==
List of extended plays
Title	Details
4 Clubbers Only, Vol. 1	Released: 14 June 2019; Label: Zerocool Recordings; Formats: Digital download
Feels Like Love	Released: 5 July 2019; Label: Zerocool Recordings; Formats: Digital download
I Don't Wanna	Released: 9 August 2019; Label: Zerocool Recordings; Formats: Digital download

== Charted singles ==
Title	Year	Peak chart positions												Album
Title	Year	NLD	AUS	AUT	BEL (Vl)	BEL (Wa)	DAN	FRA	GER	NOR	SWE	SWI	US Dance	Album
"Circuits" (with Quintino)	2012	69	—	—	—	—	—	—	—	—	—	—	—	Non-album singles
"Dynamite" (with Quintino featuring Taylr Renee)	2013	16^{[A]}	—	—	—	—	—	—	—	—	—	—	—	Non-album singles
"Virus (How About Now)" (with Martin Garrix)	2014	27	—	—	34	2^{[C]}	—	50	94	—	—	—	33	Non-album singles
"Boom" (with Major Lazer featuring Ty Dolla $ign, Wizkid and Kranium)	2016	39	—	57	1^{[B]}	36^{[C]}	17	92	38	10	70	—	27	Non-album singles
"—" denotes a recording that did not chart or was not released in that territory.

== Other singles ==
Incomplete list of songs by MOTi
Title	Year	Release details	Album
"Circuits" (with Quintino)	2012	Wall Recordings (April 16, 2012)	Non-album singles
"Kinky Denise" (with Quintino)	2012	Wall Recordings (Sep 3, 2012)	Non-album singles
"Krack!"	2013	Spinnin Records (Mar 8, 2013)	Non-album singles
"Nanana" (with Alvaro)	2013	Hysteria Recs (June 3, 2013)	Non-album singles
"Back To The Acid" (with Tiësto)	2013	Musical Freedom (June 25, 2013)	Non-album singles
"Dynamite" (with Quintino)	2013	Spinnin Records (Sep 23, 2013)	Non-album singles
"Dynamite" (with Quintino featuring Taylr Renee)	2013	Spinnin Records (Sep 26, 2013)	Non-album singles
"Heat It Up"	2013	Spinnin Records (Nov 22, 2013)	Non-album singles
"Don't Go Lose It"	2014	Musical Freedom (Feb 10, 2014)	Non-album singles
"This Is Dirty" (with DVBBS)	2014	Musical Freedom (Apr 28, 2014)	Non-album singles
"Crash" (with Quintino)	2014	Spinnin Records (Jul 18, 2014)	Non-album singles
"Zeus" (with Kenneth G)	2014	Musical Freedom (Sep 22, 2014)	Non-album singles
"Virus (How About Now)" (with Martin Garrix)	2014	Spinnin Records (Oct 27, 2014)	Non-album singles
"Lion (In My Head)"	2014	Musical Freedom (Dec 01, 2014)	Non-album singles
"Ganja" (with Dzeko & Torres)	2014	Doorn / Spinnin' Records (Jan 12, 2015)	Non-album singles
"Blow Your Mind" (with Tiësto)	2015	Musical Freedom (Feb 9, 2015)	Non-album singles
"Valencia"	2015	Musical Freedom (May 4, 2015)	Non-album singles
"The House Of Now" (Tiësto Edit)	2015	Musical Freedom (Jun 09, 2015)	Non-album singles
"Ghost in the Machine" (with Blasterjaxx and Jonathan Mendelsohn)	2015	Spinnin Records (Jul 17, 2015)	Non-album singles
"Spack Jarrow" (with W&W)	2015	Musical Freedom (Sep 07, 2015)	Non-album singles
"Boom" (with Major Lazer) (featuring Ty Dolla Sign, Kranium and Wizkid)	2015	Mad Decent (Nov 20, 2015)	Non-album singles
"Lost" (with Sander van Doorn)	2015	Spinnin Records (Nov 20, 2015)	Non-album singles
"Killer" (with Patrolla vs Adamski featuring Seal)	2016	Musical Freedom	Non-album singles
"Turn Me Up (Original / ViP Mix)"	2016	Musical Freedom (Mar 18, 2016)	Non-album singles
"Switch" (with Dvbbs)	2016	Spinnin' Records (Apr 25, 2016)	Non-album singles
"Louder"	2016	Spinnin' Records (Jun 3, 2016)	Non-album singles
"Legends" (with Alpharock)	2016	Spinnin' Premium (Jun 24, 2016)	Non-album singles
"East West" (with Kenneth G)	2016	Heldeep Records (Oct 3, 2016)	Heldeep DJ Tools EP Part 3
"Disco Weapon" (with Maurice West)	2016	Musical Freedom (Oct 10, 2016)	Non-album singles
"Livin' 4 Ya" (featuring Katt Niall)	2016	Hexagon Records (Dec 2, 2016)	Non-album singles
"Omen" (with Kenneth G and Olly James)	2017	Revealed Recordings (Feb 13, 2017)	Non-album singles
"The Game" (featuring Yton)	2017	Interstellar Label (Apr 14, 2017)	Non-album singles
"The Game (ViP Mix)" (featuring Yton)	2017	Interstellar Label (Jun 1, 2017)	Non-album singles
"Say!" (featuring Yton)	2017	Interstellar Label (Jun 23, 2017)	Non-album singles
"Wired" (with Jay Hardway) (featuring Babet)	2017	Spinnin' Premium (Dec 22, 2017)	Non-album singles
"Break the House Down" (with Tiësto)	2018	Musical Freedom (March 30, 2018)	I Like It Loud
"We Own the Night" (with Chancellor)	2018	Unleashed (May 18, 2018)	Non-album singles
"Just Don't Know It Yet" (featuring Bullysongs)	2018	MOTi Music (June 15, 2018)	Non-album singles
"I See Light In You" (featuring Faye Medeson)	2018	Spinnin' Premium (June 29, 2018)	Non-album singles
"Down Easy" (with Showtek featuring Starley and Wyclef Jean)	2018	Showtek Productions (July 27, 2018)	Non-album singles
"Up All Night" (with R3hab featuring Fiora)	2018	Cyb3rpvnk (October 26, 2018)	Non-album singles
"Mad Love" (with Vigiland)	2018	Zerocool (November 9, 2018)	Non-album singles
"Who We Are" (featuring Lovespeake)	2018	Zerocool (November 23, 2018)	Non-album singles
"Hooked" (with Sheezan)	2018	Zerocool (December 21, 2018)	Non-album singles
"Friday" (featuring Jguar)	2019	Zerocool (January 4, 2019)	Non-album singles
"Stay" (featuring Alida)	2019	Zerocool (January 18, 2019)	Non-album singles
"Work"	2019	Zerocool (January 25, 2019)	Non-album singles
"Worst In Me" (with THRDL!FE and Carla Monroe)	2019	Zerocool (February 1, 2019)	Non-album singles
"Like This Like That"	2019	Zerocool (February 8, 2019)	Non-album singles
"Found Love" (with Terry McLove featuring Lovespeake)	2019	Zerocool (February 15, 2019)	Non-album singles
"Bring It Back"	2019	Zerocool (February 22, 2019)	Non-album singles
"Beautiful" (with Jetfire featuring Lovespeake)	2019	Zerocool (March 1, 2019)	Non-album singles
"Rabbit Hole" (with Terry McLove)	2019	Zerocool (March 8, 2019)	Non-album singles
"Mysterious Girl" (with Rowen Reecks featuring Nathaniel)	2019	Zerocool (March 15, 2019)	Non-album singles
"Side 2 Side" (with Riggi & Piros)	2019	Zerocool (March 22, 2019)	Non-album singles
"La Verdolaga" (featuring Totó la Momposina)	2019	Zerocool (March 29, 2019)	Non-album singles
"Sink Deeper" (featuring Icona Pop)	2019	Universal Music (April 5, 2019)	Non-album singles
"Bangalore" (with Domastic)	2019	Zerocool (April 12, 2019)	Non-album singles
"Dangerous"	2019	Zerocool (April 19, 2019)	Non-album singles
"Feel It Too" (with Joe Ghost featuring Danny Fernandes)	2019	Zerocool (April 26, 2019)	Non-album singles
"Tequila" (with David Flix)	2019	Zerocool (May 3, 2019)	Non-album singles
"Ice" (with Matthew Hill)	2019	Zerocool (May 10, 2019)	Non-album singles
"For the Love of Money" (with Michael Ford)	2019	Zerocool (May 17, 2019)	Non-album singles
"Front 2 Back" (with Riggi & Piros)	2019	Zerocool (May 24, 2019)	Non-album singles
"Be With You" (with Gln and Mark Vox)	2019	Zerocool (May 31, 2019)	Non-album singles
"My House" (with Ldn Noise)	2019	Zerocool (June 7, 2019)	Non-album singles
"I Don't Wanna" (with Liu featuring Raphaella)	2019	Zerocool (July 26, 2019)	I Don't Wanna EP
"Was it Love" (with Project M and Lovespeake)	2019	Zerocool (August 2, 2019)	I Don't Wanna EP
"Hey Hey" (with Cinco Cinco)	2019	Zerocool (August 9, 2019)	I Don't Wanna EP
"Shoot to Kill" (with Groovenatics and Jon Moodie)	2019	Zerocool (August 23, 2019)	Shoot to Kill EP
"Instagram DJ" (with Bodyworx)	2019	Zerocool (August 30, 2019)	Shoot to Kill EP
"In Particular" (with Æmes)	2019	Zerocool (September 6, 2019)	Shoot to Kill EP
"Spark" (featuring Fly By Midnight)	2019	Zerocool (September 20, 2019)	Spark EP
"Tribe" (with Lady Bee and Carla Monroe)	2019	Zerocool (September 27, 2019)	Spark EP
"Dreamers" (with Project M and Lovespeake)	2019	Zerocool (October 4, 2019)	Spark EP
"Home" (with Laeko)	2019	Zerocool (November 1, 2019)	Non-album singles
"Sleeptalking"	2019	Zerocool (November 8, 2019)	Non-album singles
"Down For It" (with Rebecca & Fiona)	2019	Zerocool (November 15, 2019)	Non-album singles
"No Work Today" (with Aiaya)	2019	Zerocool (November 22, 2019)	Non-album singles
"Feels Like You" (with Robert Falcon)	2019	Zerocool (December 6, 2019)	Non-album singles
"All the Love You Got"	2019	Zerocool (December 20, 2019)	Non-album singles
"Everything Cool"	2020	Zerocool (January 10, 2020)	Non-album singles
"Tonight Tonight" (with Kifi)	2020	Zerocool (January 24, 2020)	Non-album singles
"Move That Body" (with Bodyworx)	2020	Zerocool (January 31, 2020)	Non-album singles
"Lonely Nights" (with Anisa)	2020	Zerocool (February 7, 2020)	Non-album singles
"Nothing But Love"	2020	Zerocool (February 14, 2020)	Non-album singles
"Under Water" (with Kheela)	2020	Zerocool (February 21, 2020)	Non-album singles
"Gimme What You Got" (with Bodyworx)	2020	Zerocool (February 28, 2020)	Non-album singles
"Always On My Mind" (with Anisa)	2020	Zerocool (March 6, 2020)	Non-album singles
"Encore" (with Ture Brute)	2020	Zerocool (April 3, 2020)	Non-album singles
"What U Waiting Fo" (with Bodyworx)	2020	Zerocool (April 10, 2020)	Non-album singles
"Sing For Me" (with Mary N'Diaye)	2020	Zerocool (April 10, 2020)	Non-album singles
"Sweat" (with Bodyworx)	2020	Zerocool (May 22, 2020)	Non-album singles
"No Mercy" (with NoMerci)	2020	Zerocool (May 22, 2020)	Non-album singles
"Push It Right" (with Laura White)	2020	Zerocool (June 19, 2020)	Non-album singles
"The Squat Song" (with Bodyworx)	2020	Zerocool (June 26, 2020)	Non-album singles
"Say! Say!" (with NoMerci)	2020	Zerocool (July 3, 2020)	Non-album singles
"Over You" (with NoMerci)	2020	Zerocool (July 17, 2020)	Non-album singles
"Tarantino" (with Yton and Kéwork)	2020	Zerocool (July 24, 2020)	Non-album singles
"Work That Trunk" (with Bodyworx)	2020	Zerocool (August 7, 2020)	Non-album singles
"I Don't Wanna Know" (with NoMerci)	2020	Zerocool (August 14, 2020)	Non-album singles
"Won't Be Me" (with Mary N'Diaye)	2020	Zerocool (August 21, 2020)	Non-album singles
"Flex & Pump" (with Bodyworx)	2020	Zerocool (August 28, 2020)	Non-album singles
"Moon Child" (with Double-N)	2020	Zerocool (September 11, 2020)	Non-album singles
"Nineteen" (with Jennifer Cooke)	2020	Zerocool (October 9, 2020)	Non-album singles
"Oh La La" (with Gabry Ponte featuring Mougleta)	2021	Spinnin' Records (March 5, 2021)	Non-album singles
"In My Head (On My Mind)"	2021	Zerocool (April 2, 2021)	Non-album singles
"Bam Bam Bam" (with Lunax and Marmy)	2021	Zerocool (April 16, 2021)	Non-album singles
"Helter Skelter" (with Bassjackers)	2021	Zerocool (May 7, 2021)	Non-album singles
"Everybody" (with Bodyworx)	2021	Zerocool (May 21, 2021)	Non-album singles
"Ringtone" (with Ellipso and Wilhelmina)	2021	Zerocool (June 4, 2021)	Non-album singles
"Pump Up the Jam" (with Mary N'Diaye)	2021	Zerocool (June 18, 2021)	Non-album singles
"Loco Loco" (with Captain Jack and Gerson Rafael)	2021	Zerocool (July 2, 2021)	Non-album singles
"I Just Came Here To Get High" (with Crispie)	2021	Zerocool (July 16, 2021)	Non-album singles
"Sushi" (with Ilira)	2021	Zerocool (July 30, 2021)	Non-album singles
"Back To You" (with Corsak and Georgia Ku)	2021	Liquid State (November 11, 2021)	Non-album singles
"Booty Part 2" (with Bodyworx)	2021	Zerocool (November 26, 2021)	Non-album singles
"I Wonder" (with Frank Walker featuring Shai)	2021	FSW (December 10, 2021)	Non-album singles
"Hallelujah" (with Joe Killington)	2021	Zerocool (February 18, 2022)	Non-album singles

== Guest appearances ==
Selected songs featuring MOTi
Single	Year	Artist(s)	Album
"On The Floor Like" (featuring MOTi)	2015	Bassjackers and Joe Ghost	Non-album single

== Remixes and edits ==
Selected remixes by MOTi
Title	Year	Original artist
"Hello (MOTi Remix)"	2013	Stafford Brothers featuring Lil Wayne and Christina Milian
"'Surrender (MOTi Remix)"	2013	Daddy's Groove and Mindshake
"Kids Again (MOTi Remix)"	2014	Example
"Light Years Away (Tiёsto and MOTi Remix)"	2014	Tiësto featuring DBX (i.e. Pete Kirtley and others)
"Lean On (Tiёsto & MOTi Remix)"	2015	Major Lazer and DJ Snake featuring MØ
"So F**kin' Romantic (MOTi Remix)"	2015	Matthew Koma
"White Clouds (MOTi Remix)"	2015	Dvbbs
"Killer (MOTi Remix)"	2016	Patrolla and Adamski featuring Seal
"No Money (MOTi Remix)"	2016	Galantis
"Summer Nights (MOTi Remix)"	2016	Tiësto featuring John Legend
"Find You (MOTi Remix)"	2016	Topic featuring Jake Reese
"Beautiful Trauma (MOTi Remix)"	2018	Pink
"You Are The Reason (MOTi Remix)"	2018	Calum Scott
"Wolves (MOTi Remix)"	2018	Selena Gomez and Marshmello
"Over My Head (MOTi Remix)"	2018	Echosmith
"Drink About (MOTi Remix)"	2018	Seeb featuring Dagny
"All You Sexy Ladies" (MOTi Remix)	2018	Kivah
"Finest Hour" (MOTi Remix)	2018	Cash Cash featuring Abir
"Otherside" (MOTi Remix)	2018	Elephante featuring Nevve
"Make Me Do" (MOTi Remix)	2018	Fais
"Alive" (MOTi Edit)	2018	Terry McLove
"Speechless" (MOTi Remix)	2019	Robin Schulz featuring Erika Sirola
"You Gotta Be" (MOTi and Terry McLove Remix)	2019	Bombs Away featuring Reigan
"Kills You Slowly" (MOTi Remix)	2019	The Chainsmokers
"I Don't Belong In This Club" (MOTi Remix)	2019	Why Don't We and Macklemore
"Dance on the Table" (MOTi Remix)	2019	Cliq featuring Caitlyn Scarlett, Kida Kudz and Double S
"Love Me" (MOTi and Terry McLove Remix)	2019	Stanaj
"Awa Ni" (MOTi Remix)	2019	The Knocks and Kah-Lo
"Don't Give Up On Me Now" (MOTi and Terry McLove Remix)	2019	R3hab and Julie Bergan
"OMG" (MOTi Remix)	2019	Gryffin and Carly Rae Jepsen
"Always Feel Like" (MOTi Remix)	2019	Dave Winnel and Dlmt
"Faith" (MOTi and Terry McLove Remix)	2020	Galantis and Dolly Parton featuring Mr Probz
"Good On You" (MOTi Remix)	2020	Krewella and Nucleya
"Your Mistakes" (MOTi Edit)	2020	Alva Gracia
"Lazy Day" (MOTi Remix)	2020	Fuse ODG featuring Danny Ocean
"We Are Life" (MOTi Remix)	2020	Stadiumx and Sebastian Wibe featuring Mingue
"End of Time" (MOTi Remix)	2020	K-391, Alan Walker, and Ahrix
"Love To Go" (MOTi Remix)	2020	Lost Frequencies, Zonderling and Kelvin Jones
"Up And Down" (MOTi Remix)	2020	Kristen Hanby
"Nightlight" (MOTi Remix)	2020	Illenium
"Revolving" (MOTi Remix)	2021	Yung Bae featuring Marc E. Bassy
"When You're Out" (MOTi Remix)	2021	Billen Ted featuring Mae Muller
"Sunshine" (MOTi Remix)	2021	OneRepublic
"After You" (MOTi Remix)	2022	Gryffin featuring Calle Lehmann
"Those Eyes" (MOTi Remix)	2022	Arty featuring Griff Clawson
"Maybe You're the Problem" (MOTi Remix)	2022	Ava Max
