= Club Life, Vol. 4 - New York City =

Compilation album by Tiësto
- Released: 18 May 2015
- Genre: Progressive house; electro house; Big room house
- Length: 1:03:03
- Label: Musical Freedom; PM:AM; Universal
- Producer: MOTi; John Christian; Tiësto; KSHMR; Dzeko & Torres; Maestro Harrell; Martin Garrix; Bobby Puma; Rob Kleiner; Sergio Popken; Disco Fries; Seven Lions; A&G; Dotan; twoloud; Wee-O; Alvaro; JETFIRE; DallasK; Firebeatz; Zaxx; Riggi & Piros

Tiësto chronology
A Town Called Paradise (2014)	Club Life, Vol. 4 - New York City (2015)	Club Life, Vol. 5 - China (2017)

Singles from Club Life, Vol. 4 - New York City
- 1. "Secrets" Released: 16 March 2015; 2. "The Only Way Is Up" Released: 4 May 2015; 3. "Show Me" Released: 22 June 2015

Club Life, Vol. 4 - New York City is a mixed compilation album by Dutch DJ/producer Tiësto. It is the fourth installment of his Club Life compilation series and it was released through Musical Freedom on 18 May 2015.

The song "The Only Way Is Up" premiered through a commercial ad presented by 7UP entitled "Team UP", which featured both artists. The collaborative track was released through Tiësto's Musical Freedom label as a digital download by Beatport. It was originally called "Voices" until it was released with the 7UP campaign and renamed "The Only Way Is Up". This commercial was filmed at the desert outside Las Vegas.

== Track listing ==
No.	Title	Artist(s)	Length
1.	"Valencia" (John Christian Remix) (Intro Edit)	MOTi	3:47
2.	"Secrets"	Tiësto and KSHMR (featuring Vassy)	4:11
3.	"For You"	Dzeko & Torres and Maestro Harrell (featuring Delora)	3:14
4.	"The Only Way Is Up"	Martin Garrix and Tiësto	4:18
5.	"Someone Somewhere" (Tiësto Edit)	Bobby Puma (featuring Natalie Major)	3:41
6.	"Butterflies"	Tiësto	4:02
7.	"Chant"	Tiësto and Disco Fries	3:48
8.	"Change Your World"	Tiësto	3:44
9.	"Lucid"	A&G	3:59
10.	"Kashmir"	KSHMR	4:03
11.	"Air"	Dzeko & Torres (featuring Delaney)	3:37
12.	"Home" (Tiësto vs. twoloud Remix)	Dotan	3:41
13.	"Fighting For" (Tiësto Edit)	Wee-O (featuring Morgan Karr)	2:44
14.	"Guestlist"	Alvaro and JETFIRE	3:52
15.	"Show Me"	Tiësto and DallasK	2:59
16.	"Sky High" (Tiësto Edit)	Firebeatz	2:14
17.	"The House of Now" (Tiësto Edit)	MOTi	2:07
18.	"Alpha"	ZAXX vs. Riggi & Piros	3:02

- Someone Somewhere (Tiësto Edit) features uncredited production by John Christian and Rob Kleiner
- Butterflies features uncredited production by Sergio Popken
- Change Your World features uncredited production by Seven Lions
- Fighting For (Tiësto Edit) features uncredited production by John Christian

== Charts ==
Chart (2015)	Peak; position
Belgian Compilations (Ultratop Wallonia)	13
Dutch Compilations (MegaCharts)	7
Norwegian Albums (VG-lista)	29
UK Compilation Albums (OCC)	68
UK Dance Albums (OCC)	12
UK Album Downloads (OCC)	76
US Billboard 200	89
US Top Dance Albums (Billboard)	2

=== Singles ===
"The Only Way Is Up"
Chart (2015–16)	Peak position
Netherlands (Single Top 100)	74
Sweden (Sverigetopplistan)	81
US Hot Dance/Electronic Songs (Billboard)	41
