= Club Life, Vol. 5 - China =

Compilation album by Tiësto
- Released: 6 October 2017
- Genre: Electro house; big room house; brazilian bass
- Length: 1:00:47
- Label: Musical Freedom; Spinnin'
- Producer: Tiësto, John Christian, SWACQ, KSHMR, Stargate, Sevenn, Diplo, Dzeko

Tiësto chronology
Club Life, Vol. 4 - New York City (2015)	Club Life, Vol. 5 - China (2017)	I Like It Loud (2018)

Singles from Club Life, Vol. 3 - Stockholm
- 1. "Boom" Released: 24 April 2017; 2. "Harder" Released: 16 June 2017; 3. "Scream" Released: 8 September 2017; 4. "Carry You Home" Released: 29 September 2017

Club Life, Vol. 5 - China is a mixed compilation album by Dutch DJ and producer Tiësto. It is the fifth installment of his Club Life compilation series, and was released through Musical Freedom on 20 November 2017. The album was compiled in collaboration with Dutch artists John Christian and SWACQ.

== Background and development ==
Club Life, Vol. 5 - China is the fifth installment of the Club Life series, which comes after Club Life, Vol. 4 - New York City. Based on Tiësto, this compilation was created mainly for festival and stadium play, in front of large audiences. "The stuff on this album is what I want to play, and the crowd I see over there in China inspires me and us to make this style of music," says Tiësto. He first met John Christian in 2013 through his remake of Tiësto's "Flight 643", and was attracted by his music production. "He has a very special production quality that is a lot higher than most producers in the world. He then introduced me to SWACQ (Sounds With A Certain Quality), and we decided to create this whole movement together," explained Tiësto. They then decided to collaborate to create an album with the SWACQ sound collective, whose tracks would represent the feeling of DJs who are performing live. "I wanted to really bring back the feeling I get when I’m onstage, back into the music. I really tried to create an album that represents the feeling literally when you’re DJing live," says Tiësto.

Besides John Christian, this album also features collaborations with other music producers and singers, such as KSHMR, Diplo, Talay Riley, Vassy, Aloe Blacc, and ex South Korean-Chinese boy group Exo member Huang Zitao.

During an interview conducted with Highsnobiety, Tiësto stated that the inspiration to create the album came from him noticing the apparent lack of energetic tracks in the EDM scene. "Since a lot of DJs have gone into pop lately, I decided to do the opposite and make an album full of big room, energetic bangers. This album was designed to be played at a festival or in a club. I made it for myself because I couldn’t find enough energetic, up-tempo music," voiced Tiësto. He also mentioned that the fast-growing music scene in China has fascinated and impressed him, as there’s "such excitement everywhere you go and with every crowd you play for".

== Critical reception ==
Karlie Powell from Your EDM commented that with "banger after banger", the collection of "pounding festival anthems" manages to go "hard", which succeeds in channelling the "feeling of a massive show" through one's speakers and reaching the high bar set by previously released single "Scream".

== Track listing ==
No.	Title	Artist(s)	Length
1.	"Harder" (Harder Intro Edit)	Tiësto and KSHMR featuring Talay Riley	3:34
2.	"Faster Than A Bullet"	Tiësto and Vassy	3.26
3.	"Scream"	Tiësto and John Christian	3:13
4.	"Carry You Home" (Tiësto's Big Room Mix)	Tiësto featuring Stargate and Aloe Blacc	3:46
5.	"No Worries" (Tiësto's Big Room Mix)	Tiësto	4:03
6.	"Boom"	Tiësto and Sevenn	2:34
7.	"C'mon" (John Christian Remix)	Tiësto vs. Diplo	3:26
8.	"Back to the Oldskool"	John Christian	3:33
9.	"Fat Beat"	Tiësto	3:28
10.	"Funkastarz"	John Christian	3:11
11.	"Crazy" (Tiësto's Big Room Mix)	Tiësto and Dzeko featuring Delaney Jane	3:38
12.	"Revolt"	John Christian	3:29
13.	"Sumos"	Tiësto and SWACQ	3:16
14.	"Guerilla"	SWACQ	3:03
15.	"Don't Stop"	Tiësto	3:31
16.	"The Impact"	SWACQ	2:50
17.	"Brolab"	Tiësto, John Christian and SWACQ	3:12
18.	"Time" (Tiësto's Big Room Mix)	Z.Tao	3:34

== Charts ==
Chart (2017)	Peak; position
US Dance/Electronic Albums (Billboard)	17
Dutch Compilations (MegaCharts)	15
