= Invisible Children (song) =

Single by KSHMR and Tigerlily
- Released: September 16, 2016
- Recorded: 2016
- Genre: Electro house
- Length: 2:49
- Label: Spinnin'
- Songwriter(s): Niles Hollowell-Dhar; Dara Kristen Hayes
- Producer(s): KSHMR; Tigerlily

KSHMR singles chronology
"Wildcard" (2016)	"Invisible Children" (2016)	"Harder" (2017)

"Invisible Children" is a song by American DJ KSHMR and Australian DJ Tigerlily. It was released on September 16, 2016 via Spinnin' Records.

== Background ==
KSHMR spoke of the collaboration, saying "Tigerlily first sent the idea to Tiësto, who suggested that she and I work on it together." The name refers to "slum kids", who KSHMR said are in places where "poverty is so rampant that people begin to stop noticing."

The song has been accused of plagiarizing the song "IndiRasta" by Israeli musician Jango. However, KSHMR has denied these accusations, claiming that they just happened to use the same vocal sample and he hadn't known of Jango's song beforehand. Jango himself also denied that KSHMR copied his work: "the project file that you all think "tigerlily stole" from me is one big bulls**t ==. it's just a huge coincidence ... the project was on my computer the whole time and no one stole it,Even though that would be cool if kshmr actually liked the idea and made it better. Thank you all for defending me though,You guys are the best"[sic]

== Charts ==
Chart (2016)	Peak position
France (SNEP)	178
