= Scream (Tiësto and John Christian song) =

Single by Tiësto and John Christian

from the album Club Life, Vol. 5 - China
- Released: 8 September 2017
- Genre: Big room house
- Length: 3:13
- Label: Musical Freedom; Spinnin'
- Composers: Tijs Verwest; John Dirne; T. Dekkers
- Producers: John Christian; Tiësto

Tiësto singles chronology
"Harder" (2017)	"Scream" (2017)	"Carry You Home" (2017)

John Christian singles chronology
"The Sign" (2017)	"Scream" (2017)	"Back To The Oldskool" (2017)

"Scream" is a song by Dutch DJs and record producers Tiësto and John Christian. It was written by T. Dekkers, Tiësto and Christian, with production handled by the latter two. The song was released through Musical Freedom on 8 September 2017 as the third and lead single from Tiësto's compilation album, Club Life, Vol. 5 - China (2017).

== Background ==
Tiësto premiered a preview of the song, exclusively through Billboard Dance, alongside the announcement of his upcoming compilation album, Club Life, Vol. 5 - China, in which it is included.

== Critical reception ==
Kat Bein of Billboard deemed the song "a massive, stomping electro-house tune big enough to fill the biggest festival field" and "a main stage anthem the way they used to make them in 2010", and felt it is "gritty and loud". Karlie Powell of Your EDM called the song a "scream-worthy true festival anthem", and opined that it "channels the kind of electrifying energy felt when lost in the center of a mass of people" at music festivals, and "takes on a life of its own through the pumping beat and strategically woven wubs". He wrote that it meets his expectations for Tiësto's work. Erik of EDM Sauce regarded the song as "an exciting track that will no doubt get main stage crowds losing their mind over the fall and winter months". He described it as "a throwback to the era of cross over trance tracks", to which he provided the 2013 single "Black Light" by Ferry Corsten as an example. He added that this song is not something entirely new, but "is still so much fun and will keep your attention throughout". Johan Dekock of We Rave You called it "a brand new piece of EDM magic".

== Track listing ==
Digital Download

1. "Scream" (Extended Mix) - 3:54

Transluscent Green 7"

1. "Scream" (Radio Edit) - 3:07
2. "Scream" (Extended Mix) - 3:49
