= Dawnbreaker =

Dawnbreaker may refer to:

- The Dawn-Breakers, a 1887–88 account of the early Bábí and Bahá'í faiths by Nabíl-i-A`zam
- Dawn Breakers International Film Festival, an international traveling film festival
- Dawnbreaker (Batman), an alternate version of the DC Comics superhero
- Dawnbreaker Studios, San Fernando, California, a recording studio for Destiny by The Jacksons and other albums
- "Dawnbreaker", a 2018 song by Tiësto from I Like It Loud
- "Dawnbreaker", a 2025 song used in Wuthering Waves' 3.0 Trailer
