= Don't Look Down (Martin Garrix song) =

Single by Martin Garrix featuring Usher
- Released: 17 March 2015
- Recorded: 2014
- Genre: Deep house
- Length: 3:43 (radio edit); 5:28 (extended version)
- Label: Spinnin'; RCA; Sony Music
- Songwriters: James John Abrahart Jr.; Michael Busbee; Martijn Garritsen; Usher Raymond IV
- Producer: Martin Garrix

Martin Garrix singles chronology
"Forbidden Voices" (2015)	"Don't Look Down" (2015)	"The Only Way Is Up" (2015)

Usher singles chronology
"The Matrimony" (2015)	"Don't Look Down" (2015)	"Chains" (2015)

"Don't Look Down" is a song by Dutch DJ and record producer Martin Garrix, featuring vocals from American singer Usher. It was released as a digital download on 17 March 2015 on iTunes.

== Background ==
Talking about his collaboration with Usher, Garrix said: "I had the track and he was at my manager Scooter’s house when I sent it over. Next thing I knew, I was on a FaceTime call with Usher, who said, 'I would love to do the track.' A week later, we were in the studio. It was super quick!" He also said the song is about "focusing on the positive side of everything."

== Composition and critical reception ==
"Don't Look Down" is written in the key of A minor with a tempo of 128 beats per minute. The song follows a chord progression of Am – F – C, and Usher's vocals span from G_{3} to C_{5}.

Billboard's Jason Lipshutz wrote, "Dutch EDM wunderkind Martin Garrix pivots from his standard sinister instrumental bangers and puts on his best David Guetta mask for 'Don't Look Down'. Usher has toed the now-or-never party line many times before, but his spirited vocals and a cheerful xylophone drop make this collabo a pop winner". Another Billboard contributor, Matt Madved, also noted Guetta's influences, with Garrix "ditching harder-edged trappings of festival house for cheery guitar-backed verses and a softer melodic lead". Idolator's Robbie Daw called it "a nice blend of dance beats and radio-friendly pop that should be music to programmers’ ears."

== Music video ==
A lyric video directed by Rory Kramer showing a man quitting his job and enjoying life was released on 17 March 2015. Two official music videos were released on 23 March 2015 giving a female and male perspective of work at a country club. Usher does not appear in the video.

== Charts ==
=== Weekly charts ===
Chart (2015)	Peak position
Australia (ARIA)	63
Austria (Ö3 Austria Top 40)	37
Belgium (Ultratop 50 Flanders)	26
Belgium (Ultratop 50 Wallonia)	37
Canada (Canadian Hot 100)	55
Czech Republic (Top 100)	12
France (SNEP)	136
Germany (GfK)	37
Hungary (Editors' Choice Top 40)	26
Hungary (Stream Top 40)	22
Ireland (IRMA)	29
Italy (FIMI)	49
Mexico Airplay (Billboard)	46
Netherlands (Dutch Top 40)	10
Netherlands (Single Top 100)	16
Russia Airplay (Tophit)	64
Scotland Singles (OCC)	2
Slovakia (Singles Digitál Top 100)	25
Spain (PROMUSICAE)	38
Sweden (Sverigetopplistan)	59
Switzerland (Schweizer Hitparade)	65
Ukraine Airplay (Tophit)	68
UK Singles (OCC)	9
US Bubbling Under Hot 100 (Billboard)	10
US Hot Dance/Electronic Songs (Billboard)	11
US Dance Club Songs (Billboard)	3
US Pop Airplay (Billboard)	33

=== Year-end charts ===
Chart (2015)	Position
Netherlands (Dutch Top 40)	34
Netherlands (Single Top 100)	45
US Hot Dance/Electronic Songs (Billboard)	27

== Certifications ==
Region	Certification	Certified units/sales
Australia (ARIA)	Gold	35,000^{‡}
Brazil (Pro-Música Brasil)	Gold	30,000^{‡}
Canada (Music Canada)	Gold	40,000^{‡}
Italy (FIMI)	Platinum	50,000^{‡}
New Zealand (RMNZ)	Gold	7,500^{*}
Poland (ZPAV)	Gold	10,000^{*}
United Kingdom (BPI)	Gold	400,000^{‡}
United States (RIAA)	Gold	500,000^{‡}
^{*} Sales figures based on certification alone.^{‡} Sales+streaming figures based on certification alone.

== Release history ==
Region	Date	Format	Label
Netherlands	17 March 2015	Digital download	Spinnin'
United States	17 March 2015	Digital download	Spinnin'
United Kingdom	24 May 2015	Digital download	Spinnin'
