= Harder (Tiësto and Kshmr song) =

Single by Tiësto and Kshmr featuring Talay Riley

from the album Club Life, Vol. 5 - China
- Released: June 16, 2017
- Recorded: 2017
- Genre: Tropical house; dance-pop; electro house
- Length: 3:13
- Label: Musical Freedom; Spinnin'
- Songwriter(s): Tijs Verwest; Niles Hollowell-Dhar; Talay Riley; Nick Gale
- Producer(s): Tiësto; KSHMR

Tiësto singles chronology
"Boom" (2017)	"Harder" (2017)	"Scream" (2017)

KSHMR singles chronology
"Invisible Children" (2016)	"Harder" (2017)	"Power" (2017)

Talay Riley singles chronology
"Dirty Love" (2014)	"Harder" (2017)

"Harder" is a song by Dutch DJ and record producer Tiësto and American DJ and record producer Kshmr, featuring vocals from British singer and songwriter Talay Riley. The song was written by Tiësto, KSHMR, Talay Riley and Digital Farm Animals, with production handled by Tiësto and KSHMR. It was released on June 16, 2017, via Musical Freedom, as the second single from Tiësto's compilation, Club Life, Vol. 5 - China.

== Background ==
The song debuted during Tiësto's performance at Ultra Music Festival 2017 in Miami. It was also performed at Kshmr's "Welcome to KSHMR Vol. 8" live show. Tiësto first confirmed that the song will be released on May 26, 2017 during his Club Life radio show. However, Kshmr denied this statement through a tweet on May 26, 2017, and said that the song will be released "soon". On the same day, Tiësto announced via a tweet that the song will be released on June 16, 2017, alongside the single's artwork, in which the song's featured artist was confirmed to be Talay Riley. On May 31, 2017, Musical Freedom uploaded a minute teaser of the song on SoundCloud. Tiësto also shared the teaser through a tweet on the same day. The initial preview version of the track was featured on Don Diablo's Hexagon Radio show.

== Critical reception ==
Kat Bein of Billboard magazine said: "Despite its title, it's not a bombastic, face melting tune. It's high-energy, but it's somewhat chill, like the haze that hangs over the moments just before sunrise. Vocalist Talay Riley feeds into the vibe, asking the listener to hang on a little longer and party all night. 'Harder' has KSHMR's musicality and Tiesto's rhythmic lean. It's cute, it's romantic."

Karlie Powell of Your EDM said that the song "blends musical stylings of both artists and is nothing short of magical" and "contains male and female parts, that lead up to a euphoric drop with a heavy kick and little vocal blips that hit you right in the feels." Christian Naccarato of the same publication said "'Harder' starts with KSHMR's signature Indian-influenced vocal chops. Moving forward, the track is driven by a guitar riff and an extremely emotional vocal. Quickly taking a darker turn, the track builds up to a sound that is much more "2017" than "Secrets" is. The chorus, carried by a vocal chop, tropical percussion, and a light bass line, is filled with feelings of euphoria."

Ryan Harcourt of EDMTunes said "The track starts off with vocals from Los Angeles singer Talay Riley. This tune is highlighted by a build into upbeat tropical style track that screams Summer vibes." Rajrishi Murthi of the Bangin Beats said that the song is "poised to be one of the hottest tracks during the ongoing festival season." He also regarded the song as a "tropical-inspired single" that "plays out as a delightful blend of Indian-influenced vocal chops, airy synths, infectious vocals and a smooth percussion work." Paola Maria Farina of AllSongs said that the track "turns out to be more fluid and softer than the previous collaboration "Secrets" and, thanks to the growing chorus and melody, is charged with elements becoming a full and enveloping piece." Ross Goldenberg of We Rave You said "The track is definitely a lot more mellow than its counterpart 'Secrets,' but elicits a much stronger summer-type sound with its melodic progression combined with a vocal chopped chorus. You can clearly hear influences from both of the artists' styles as 'Harder' is primed to be another hit from the two producers."

== Track listing ==
- Digital download (MF208)
1. "Harder" — 3:14
- Digital download (MF208)
1. "Harder" (Extended Mix) — 4:34
- Translucent Red 7" Vinyl (MF208)
1. "Harder" (Extended Mix) — 4:34
2. "Harder" - 3:14
- Digital download - Maurice West Remix (MF231)
1. "Harder" (Maurice West Remix) — 3:29
- Digital download - Yoel Lewis Remix (MF232)
1. "Harder" (Yoel Lewis Remix) — 3:35
- Digital download - Yoel Lewis Extended Remix (MF232)
1. "Harder" (Yoel Lewis Extended Remix) — 5:11

== Charts ==
Chart (2017)	Peak position
US Dance/Mix Show Airplay (Billboard)	28
