= Carry You Home =

Carry You Home refers to:

- "Carry You Home" (Alex Warren song)
- "Carry You Home" (James Blunt song)
- "Carry You Home" (Tiësto song)
- "Carry You Home" (Zara Larsson song)
