= Australian Open (disambiguation) =

The Australian Open is an annual grand-slam tennis tournament.

Australian Open may also refer to:

- Australian Open (badminton)
- Australian Open (golf)
- Australian Open of Surfing
- Australian Open (squash)
- Australian Goldfields Open, a professional snooker tournament
- Aussie Open (professional wrestling)
- Australian Open (bowls)
