= Waterfall (Stargate song) =

Single by Stargate featuring Pink and Sia
- Released: 10 March 2017
- Genre: Electropop; dance-pop; dancehall
- Length: 3:20
- Label: RCA
- Songwriters: Mikkel Storleer Eriksen; Tor Erik Hermansen; Thomas Wesley Pentz; Sia Furler; Philip Meckseper
- Producer: Stargate

Stargate singles chronology
| "Easier Said Than Done" (2002) | "Waterfall" (2017) | "Carry You Home" (2017) |

Pink singles chronology
| "Setting the World on Fire" (2016) | "Waterfall" (2017) | "What About Us" (2017) |

Sia singles chronology
| "Living Out Loud" (2017) | "Waterfall" (2017) | "To Be Human" (2017) |

"Waterfall" is a song by Norwegian production duo Stargate, featuring vocals by American singer Pink and Australian singer Sia. The song was released on 10 March 2017 on RCA Records. A remix by Seeb was released on April 7, 2017.

== Writing and recording ==
The song was written by Stargate, alongside Diplo, Sia and Jr. Blender. It was reportedly Sia's idea to recruit P!nk for the song.

The song was originally conducted by Sia, in partnership with Diplo and Jr Blender, and was intended to give the song to Cashmere Cat for his debut album 9, with Sia credited as a featured artist. However, the track was rejected as the original tracklist for the album was leaked and Cashmere Cat scrapped most of the project, delaying the release date of the album. Sia, however, was determined to search for a worthy artist for the song and gave it to Stargate instead, recruiting P!nk along the way.

== Critical reception ==
Stereogum's Peter Helman opined that the song "sounds very 2017."

== Music video ==
The music video was released on 16 March 2017 featuring sky dancing by Inka Henriikka Tiitto and Amalie Hegland Lauritzen. Idolator noted that neither P!nk nor Sia appears in the video, which they called a "letdown."

== Charts ==
=== Weekly charts ===
| Chart (2017) | Peak position |
|---|---|
| Australia (ARIA) | 19 |
| Austria (Ö3 Austria Top 40) | 70 |
| Belgium (Ultratip Bubbling Under Flanders) | 34 |
| Belgium (Ultratip Bubbling Under Wallonia) | 9 |
| Canada (Canadian Hot 100) | 86 |
| Canada CHR/Top 40 (Billboard) | 46 |
| Canada Hot AC (Billboard) | 30 |
| Czech Republic (Rádio – Top 100) | 75 |
| France (SNEP) | 36 |
| Germany (GfK) | 47 |
| Hungary (Rádiós Top 40) | 8 |
| Hungary (Single Top 40) | 26 |
| Ireland (IRMA) | 85 |
| Italy (FIMI) | 79 |
| Lebanon (Lebanese Top 20) | 14 |
| Luxembourg Digital Songs (Billboard) | 8 |
| Mexico (Billboard Ingles Airplay) | 50 |
| New Zealand Heatseekers (RMNZ) | 1 |
| Norway (VG-lista) | 30 |
| Poland (Polish Airplay Top 100) | 50 |
| Scotland Singles (OCC) | 10 |
| Slovakia (Rádio Top 100) | 45 |
| Sweden (Sverigetopplistan) | 67 |
| Switzerland (Schweizer Hitparade) | 38 |
| UK Singles (OCC) | 47 |
| US Adult Pop Airplay (Billboard) | 24 |
| US Dance Club Songs (Billboard) | 7 |
| US Pop Airplay (Billboard) | 33 |

=== Year-end charts ===
| Chart (2017) | Position |
|---|---|
| Hungary (Rádiós Top 40) | 51 |

== Certifications ==
| Region | Certification | Certified units/sales |
|---|---|---|
| Australia (ARIA) | Gold | 35,000^{‡} |
^{‡} Sales+streaming figures based on certification alone.

== Release history ==
| Region | Date | Format | Label | Ref. |
|---|---|---|---|---|
| Worldwide | 10 March 2017 | Digital download | RCA | |
| Italy | 10 March 2017 | Contemporary hit radio | Sony | |
