= I Like It Loud (EP) =

EP by Tiësto
- Released: 30 March 2018
- Length: 11:14
- Label: Musical Freedom; Spinnin'
- Producer: Tiësto; John Christian; Mesto; Matisse & Sadko; MOTi

Tiësto chronology
| Club Life, Vol. 5 - China (2017) | I Like It Loud (2018) | Together (2019) |

I Like It Loud is the debut extended play by Dutch DJ Tiësto. Released through his Musical Freedom record label on 30 March 2018, the EP features four songs.

== Background ==
He announced the EP on social media on 25 March 2018, saying "Thank you @ultra! Excited to announce my new I Like It Loud EP drops this Friday March 30." The EP was described as "an explosive body of work, brimming with festival bangers." The title track from the EP is a remake of the song by Marshal Masters. The songs in the EP are of different genres - the first is of Melbourne bounce, the second is of progressive house, the third is of future house and the fourth is of big room house.

== Track listing ==
I Like It Loud track listing
| No. | Title | Writer(s) | Length |
|---|---|---|---|
| 1. | "I Like It Loud" (with John Christian featuring Marshall Masters & the Ultimate MC) | Tijs Verwest; John Dirne; Marc Trauner; Sir Shawn | 3:56 |
| 2. | "Dawnbreaker" (with Matisse & Sadko) | Verwest; Alexander Parkhomenko; Yury Parkhomenko | 2:38 |
| 3. | "Coming Home" (with Mesto) | Verwest; Melle Stomp | 2:16 |
| 4. | "Break the House Down" (with MOTi) | Verwest; Timotheus "Moti" Romme | 2:24 |
| Total length: | | | 11:14 |
