= Lilian Dikmans =

Australian model

- Born: Lilian Claire Louise Dikmans; 12 December 1985 (age 40); Melbourne, Australia
- Education: University of Melbourne (BCom, LLB)
- Occupation: Model
- Years active: 2004 - (modelling)
- Modeling information
- Height: 5 ft 9 in (175 cm)
- Hair color: Brown
- Eye color: Brown

Lilian Dikmans (born 12 December 1985) is an Australian model and founder of Real Food Healthy Body (RFHB) from Melbourne, who has become the first Australian model simultaneously partaking in Muay Thai bouts.

== Modelling career ==
Dikmans was represented by Vivien's Models in Australia. Signing with the modelling agency shortly after finishing high school she worked as a model while completing her university studies appearing in television commercials for Sony, Just Car Insurance and Just Jeans.

After completing her university studies Dikmans worked as a lawyer before returning to modelling in late 2016. Shortly after her return, she was cast as the hero in national television commercials for Pure Blonde and Kmart Australia.

A model in the fitness space, Dikmans appeared on the August 2017 cover of Women's Health and Fitness Magazine with a feature article covering her career and body secrets.

With her involvement in the combat sport of Muay Thai, Dikmans has participated in fight-inspired active wear campaigns for brands such as Lululemon Athletica and Russell Athletic.

In September 2017 Dikmans was among "5 Models Who Get Runway Ready With Martial Arts" in the Evolve MMA, alongside Demi Lovato, Adriana Lima, Mia Kang, Gigi Hadid.

In February 2019 Dikmans appeared as the hero in a Ford Focus ST Line TV Commercial, featuring her Muay Thai skills.

In April 2019 Dikmans was cast in four-episode Ford "Like You Mean It" mini-series alongside world champion surfer Harley Ingleby, Australian DJ Tigerlily, and motivational speaker and podcaster Matt Purcell.

In July 2019 Dikmans appeared in the Maybelline "Generation Fluid" campaign covering her varied career. The same month she was featured on the Top 10 Fashion Models in Melbourne by Australia's Top Models alongside Alice Burdeu, Montana Cox, Martha Christie, among others.

In January 2020 Dikmans was on the Fitness First Australia magazine cover.

== Real Food Healthy Body (RFHB) ==
Real Food Healthy Body
- Abbreviation: RFHB
- Founded: 2013
- Founder: Lilian Dikmans
- Products: Recipes
- Official language: English
- Website: realfoodhealthybody.com

Lilian Dikmans is the founder of Real Food Healthy Body (RFHB). Launched in 2013, RFHB shares sweet and savoury recipes, catering to a gluten-free diet and a variety of other dietary requirements. These include grain-free, low FODMAP, low fructose, dairy-free for milk allergy, nut-free for tree nut allergy, vegetarian, and vegan diets.

Dikmans launched RFHB as a place to share her recipes after publishing her Raw Desserts ebook.

A number of RFHB recipes developed by Dikmans have been featured in various international publications, including Cauliflower and Sweet Potato Soup in Independent Online and Shakshuka with Fresh Tomatoes and Spinach in BuzzFeed.

== Muay Thai ==
Lilian Dikmans
- Division: Bantamweight
- Style: Muay Thai
- Stance: Orthodox
- Years active: 2016-2020

Kickboxing record
- Total: 3
- Wins: 2
- Losses: 0
- Draws: 1

Amateur record
- Total: 1
- Wins: 1
- Losses: 0

Dikmans commenced fighting Muay Thai in late 2016 and made her pro debut on 4 March 2017, scoring a unanimous decision against Kiri Dale at the Roots 2: Jammin event held at St Kilda Town Hall.

Dikmans fought Paris Rose at Domination Muay Thai 21 held on 27 October 2018 in Perth, Australia. The bout ended in a unanimous draw.

== Kickboxing record ==
Kickboxing record
3 Wins, 0 Losses, 1 Draw
Date	Result	Opponent	Event	Location	Method	Round	Time
2018-10-27	Draw	(Australia) Paris Rose	Domination Muay Thai 21	Perth	Decision (Unanimous)	3	2:00
2017-05-13	Win	(Australia) Geri Howley	Roots 3: Buffalo Soldier	Melbourne	Decision (Unanimous)	3	2:00
2017-03-04	Win	(Australia) Kiri Dale	Roots 2: Jammin	Melbourne	Decision (Unanimous)	3	2:00
2016-11-18	Win	(Australia) Aurora Brook	VAMAA Fight Night	Melbourne	Decision (Unanimous)	3	2:00

Legend: Win Loss Draw/No contest Notes
