= Anywhere for You =

Anywhere for You may refer to:

- "Anywhere for You" (Backstreet Boys song), 1997
- "Anywhere for You" (John Martin song), 2014
