= Animal Kingdom (band) =

British rock band

- Origin: London, England
- Genres: Indie rock, alternative rock, post-Britpop
- Years active: 2004-2014
- Labels: Warner Records, BoomBox Records, Mom + Pop Music
- Members: Richard Sauberlich; Hamish Crombie; Geoff Lea
- Past members: Wayne Yardley
- Website: http://www.weareanimalkingdom.com/

Animal Kingdom were an English alternative rock band, formed in 2004 at Goldsmiths College, London.

Comprising vocalist and guitarist Richard Sauberlich, bassist Hamish Crombie and drummer Geoff Lea, the band were originally known as The Sofa Club. Guitarist Wayne Yardley left the band some time before the recording and release of their second album.

The band released two studio albums; Signs and Wonders in 2009 and The Looking Away on 8 May 2012, before quietly disbanding in 2014.

== History ==
=== Signs and Wonders (2009–2010) ===
Their debut album Signs and Wonders was recorded by Phil Ek (Fleet Foxes/The Shins) in Seattle and released in 2009. The first single "Tin Man" was iTunes "Single of the Week" and iTunes named them Best New Alternative Act.

Support tours with Vampire Weekend, Band of Horses, Snow Patrol and Silversun Pickups followed, as well as numerous festival appearances in the UK and Europe.

Songs taken from the album were featured in various films and TV shows including Never Let Me Go (starring Keira Knightley) and HBO's Big Love. "Mephistopheles" appears in the 2012 UK film Life Just Is.

The album was praised by critics. NME described it as "Achingly beautiful celestial indie…Will have Sigur Ros quivering with envy." and The Fly magazine felt "...Their debut swells with spiritually melancholic masterpieces." Particular praise was given to the single "Chalk Stars". XFM's Jon Kennedy named "Chalk Stars" his "Song of the Year" and BBC Radio 1's Zane Lowe called "Chalk Stars" "...a stunning piece of music".

=== The Looking Away (2011–2014) ===
The band wrote and rehearsed for the album in an old church in North London. They completed their second album with Bat for Lashes/Everything Everything producer David Kosten and signed to BoomBox Records in the US.

The first single to be taken from The Looking Away was "Strange Attractor". The video on YouTube amassed over half a million views, with the song becoming the 8th most played on US alternative radio in 2012. The Looking Away was released on 8 May 2012 and the band followed its release by performing sold-out shows in New York, San Francisco and at the legendary Troubador club in Los Angeles, as well as appearing at Outside Lands festival and opening Lollapalooza.

Their song, "Get Away With it" is featured in the soundtrack of the EA Sports game, FIFA 13, as well as Sleeping Dogs under the title, “Golden Pyramids”.

=== Post-split (2014–present) ===
Frontman Richard Sauberlich now works for Surrey based Supermassive Games as a Senior Audio Designer.

Bassist Hamish Crombie now works as Head Of A&R for Ditto Music in Los Angeles, USA.

== Band members ==
- Richard Sauberlich - vocals, guitar, piano
- Hamish Crombie - bass
- Geoff Lea - drums

== Discography ==
=== Studio albums ===
Year	Title	Label
2009	Signs and Wonders	Warner Music Group
2012	The Looking Away	Mom+Pop

=== Singles ===
- "Chalk Stars" (2009)
- "Tin Man" (2009)
- "Two by Two" (2010)
- "Signs and Wonders" (2010)
- "Strange Attractor" (31 January 2012) #29 Billboard Alternative Songs
- "Strange Attractor" (3D M4n Remix) (2012)
- "Strange Attractor" (Dzeko & Torres Remix) (2012)
