= Forbidden Voices (song) =

Single by Martin Garrix
- Released: 6 February 2015
- Recorded: 2014
- Genre: Progressive house
- Length: 3:50
- Label: Spinnin' Records
- Songwriters: Martin Garrix; Martina Sorbara; Joren J. Van der Voort
- Producer: Martin Garrix

Martin Garrix singles chronology
"Virus (How About Now)" (2014)	"Forbidden Voices" (2015)	"Don't Look Down" (2015)

"Forbidden Voices" is a progressive house song by Dutch DJ and record producer Martin Garrix. It was released on 6 February 2015 and on 2 March 2015 on iTunes. The song has charted in France and the Netherlands.

== Music video ==
A music video to accompany the release of "Forbidden Voices" was first released onto YouTube on 6 February 2015 at a total length of three minutes and thirty seconds. It depicts the stages of Martin Garrix's career, such as his first live set as DJ Marty, getting signed to Spinnin' Records, playing at festivals, among many other things.

== Track listing ==
Digital download
No.	Title	Length
1.	"Forbidden Voices"	3:50

Remixes
No.	Title	Length
1.	"Forbidden Voices" (Jake Liedo Remix)	5:07

== Chart performance ==
Chart (2015)	Peak position
France (SNEP)	133
Netherlands (Single Top 100)	29
Netherlands (Dutch Top 40)	35

== Release history ==
Region	Date	Format	Label
Netherlands	2 March 2015	Digital download	Spinnin'
