= Harley Ingleby =

Australian surfer

Personal information
- Born: Coffs Harbour, New South Wales, Australia
- Website: https://harleyinglebysurf.com/

Surfing career
- Sport: Surfing
- Sponsors: FCS traction and fins
- Major achievements: Asp World Longboard Championship champion 2009 and 2014

Harley Ingleby is an Australian professional longboard surfrider.

Ingleby finished 5th in his first year competing in the 2005 ASP World Tour. In 2008, he won Oxbow world tour event in Anglet, France finishing 3rd overall in points. He won his first Asp World Longboard Championship title in 2009 and reclaimed the title in 2014 at Hainan Island, China. He is also two-time Australian longboard champion (2005, 2007) and he won the Australian Longboard Open in 2013 & 2017.

In April 2019 Ingleby was cast of mini-series Like You Mean It produced by Ford, appearing together with DJ Tigerlily, podcaster and motivational speaker Matt Purcell, and Australian model and Muay Thai fighter Lilian Dikmans.
