= Kenneth G =

Dutch DJ (born 1987)

- Born: Kenneth Geoffrey Oudejans; 27 January 1987 (age 39); Amsterdam, Netherlands
- Genres: Electro house; Progressive house
- Occupations: Musician; DJ; record producer
- Instruments: Piano; Guitar; Synthesizer
- Years active: 2009–present
- Labels: Spinnin' Records; Revealed Recordings; Hysteria Records; Dim Mak Records; Mainstage Music
- Website: kenneth-g.com/

Kenneth Geoffrey Oudejans (born Amsterdam, Netherlands 27 January 1987), better known by his stage name Kenneth G, is a Dutch DJ and record producer.

He became known in 2013 with his releases on the Dutch label Hysteria Records before joining Revealed Recordings the following year.

== Discography ==
=== Charting singles ===
| Year | Title | Peak chart positions | | | | | | | | | | | | Album |
| Year | Title | NLD | AUS | AUT | BEL (Vl) | BEL (Wa) | FIN | FRA | GER | IRL | SWE | SWI | UK | Album |
|---|---|---|---|---|---|---|---|---|---|---|---|---|---|---|
| 2008 | "Wobble" | 55 | — | — | — | — | — | — | — | — | — | — | — | Non-album singles |
| 2012 | "Bazinga" | — | — | — | 62^{[A]} | — | — | — | — | — | — | — | — | Non-album singles |
"—" denotes a recording that did not chart or was not released in that territory.

=== Singles ===
- 2008: Wobble [Club Generation]
- 2009: Konichiwa Bitches! (with Nicky Romero) [Made In NL (Spinnin')]
- 2010: Are U Serious [Selekted Music]
- 2011: Tjoppings [Made In NL (Spinnin')]
- 2012: Bazinga [Hysteria Recs]
- 2012: Wobble [Big Boss Records]
- 2013: Duckface (with Bassjackers) [Hysteria Recs]
- 2013: Basskikker [Ones To Watch Records (Mixmash)]
- 2013: Stay Weird [Hysteria Recs]
- 2013: Rage-Aholics [Revealed Recordings]
- 2014: RAVE-OLUTION (with AudioTwinz) [Hysteria Recs]
- 2014: 97 (with FTampa) [Revealed Recordings]
- 2014: Rampage (with Bassjackers) [Revealed Recordings]
- 2014: Blowfish (with Quintino) [Fly Eye Records]
- 2014: Zeus (with MOTi) [Musical Freedom]
- 2015: Pop (with Reez) [Wall Recordings]
- 2015: Kung Fu (with Maurice West) [Mainstage Music]
- 2016: Bonzaï [Mainstage Music]
- 2016: We Are One (featuring Ilang) [Armada Trice]
- 2016: East West (with MOTi) [Heldeep]
- 2017: Omen (with MOTi and Olly James) [Revealed Recordings]
- 2019: Bring The House (with Sheezan) [Zero Cool]
- 2019: Party Starter (with Sheezan) [Zero Cool]
- 2020: Body Count (with Sheezan) [Zero Cool]

=== Remixes ===
- 2012: Joachim Garraud, Alesia - Nox (MOTi & Kenneth G Remix) [Dim Mak Records]
- 2013: D-Rashid, Rishi Bass, MC Stretch - Casera (Kenneth G Remix) [Big Boss Records]
- 2014: Jason Herd, Sherry St Germain - This Is What We Came For (Kenneth G Remix) [Onelove]
- 2019: Sheezan x Mike Bocki - Atticus (Kenneth G Edit)

=== IDS/Unreleased Tracks ===
- 2017: Adele - Hello (W&W & Kenneth G Bootleg)
