= Carry You Home (Tiësto song) =

Single by Tiësto featuring StarGate and Aloe Blacc

from the album Club Life, Vol. 5 - China
- Released: 29 September 2017
- Genre: Progressive house; dance-pop
- Length: 3:12
- Label: Musical Freedom; Spinnin'; PM:AM; Universal
- Songwriters: Tijs Verwest; Mikkel Eriksen; Tor Erik Hermansen; Egbert Nathaniel Dawkins; Thom Bridges; Tom Martin
- Producers: Tiësto; StarGate

Tiësto singles chronology
"Scream" (2017)	"Carry You Home" (2017)	"Jackie Chan" (2018)

StarGate singles chronology
"Waterfall" (2017)	"Carry You Home" (2017)	"Be Right Here" (2018)

Aloe Blacc singles chronology
"S.O.S (Sound of Swing)" (2016)	"Carry You Home" (2017)	"Make Way" (2018)

"Carry You Home" is a song by the Dutch disc jockey and producer Tiësto. It features production from Norwegian music producing team StarGate and vocals from American singer and songwriter Aloe Blacc. It was released on 29 September 2017 by Musical Freedom in the Netherlands as the fourth single from Tiësto's compilation, Club Life, Vol. 5 - China.

== Critical reception ==
According to Kat Bein from Billboard, "'Carry You Home' is the friend you deserve in your time of need. Beautiful vocals from Aloe Blacc are a strong wind under the wings of this electronic hook. [...] StarGate come through with a production assist to help make this tune as grand and wide-open as long country roads." We Rave You considers that "the melody is where the true character lies in this feel-good anthem that certainly brings an uplifting atmosphere to its sound. From start to finish 'Carry You Home' is never short of a stimulating beat as the track builds to an exhilarating and rapturous chorus."

== Music video ==
The music video of the song was released on 16 October 2017. It was directed and produced by That One Blond Kid Corp.

== Track listing ==
Digital Download (MF219)

1. "Carry You Home" - 3:12

Transluscent Green 7" (MF219)

1. "Carry You Home" - 3:44
2. "Carry You Home" (Tiësto's Big Room Remix) - 4:24

Digital Download - Remixes

1. "Carry You Home" (Tiësto's AFTR:HRS Remix) - 3:28
2. "Carry You Home" (CRVVCKS Remix) - 4:55
3. "Carry You Home" (Swanky Tunes Remix) - 3:02
4. "Carry You Home" (Lulleaux Remix) - 3:16

== Charts ==
Chart (2017)	Peak position
Netherlands (Dutch Top 40)	38
US Hot Dance/Electronic Songs (Billboard)	26
