= Australian Open of Surfing =

Annual event in Sydney, Australia

The Australian Open of Surfing is an annual surf, skate and music event held on Manly Beach, Sydney, Australia. It is World Surf League sanctioned surf contests for men and women surf athletes from around the world. It is owned by IMG The inaugural nine-day event was held from the 11 to 19 February 2012. The Open was cancelled in 2018.

== Pro Final Winners ==
Year	Pro Men's	Pro Women's
2021	Marlon Harrison	Ellia Smith
2017	Jesse Mendes	Malia Manuel
2016	Dion Atkinson	Nikki Van Dijk
2015	Kolohe Andino	Laura Enever
2014	Adriano de Souza	Carissa Moore
2013	Alejo Muniz	Carissa Moore
2012	Matt Banting	Sally Fitzgibbons

== Australian Longboard Surfing Open ==
The event began as the ‘Malfunction' Surf Festival in 1984. In 2012, the Longboard Surfing Open replaced the ‘Malfunction’ competition and went on to become the largest World Surf League sanctioned longboard competition in Australia. The open is held every March at Kingscliff, Tweed Heads, New South Wales. The event was not run in 2019 and 2020.

== Pro Final Winners ==
Year	Pro Men's	Pro Women's
2019	Harley Ingleby	Emily Lethbridge
2018	Dane Pioli	Honolua Blomfield
2017	Harley Ingleby	Natsumi Taoka
2016	Taylor Jensen	Chloe Calmon
2015	Taylor Jensen	Karina Rozunko
2014	Taylor Jensen	Jennifer Smith
2013	Harley Ingleby	Georgia Young
2012	Taylor Jensen	Chelsea Williams
