= Virus (How About Now) =

Single by Martin Garrix and MOTi
- Released: 13 October 2014
- Genre: Electro house
- Length: 4:33
- Label: Spinnin'
- Songwriters: Martijn Garritsen; Niclas Lundin; Leon Paul Palmen; Timo Romme; Jenny Wahlström
- Producers: Martin Garrix; MOTi

Martin Garrix singles chronology
"Set Me Free" (2014)	"Virus (How About Now)" (2014)	"Forbidden Voices" (2015)

"Virus (How About Now)" is a song by Dutch DJs and record producers Martin Garrix and MOTi. It was released as a digital download on 13 October 2014 on Beatport and on 27 October 2014 on iTunes. The song was written by Martin Garrix, Niclas Lundin, Leon Paul Palmen, MOTi and Jenny Wahlström, who also provided vocals for the track.

== Music video ==
A music video to accompany the release of "Virus (How About Now)" was first released onto YouTube on 13 October 2014 at a total length of three minutes and nineteen seconds.

The video features Jenny Wahlström in the opening and also follows a man who wake up only to find out that he was in virus mode and then being chased by a group of agents in black suits until he passes the virus to another people with Jenny being the last. Meanwhile, a boy also plays a computer game and tries to remove the virus until his brother turned off the monitor and it ends with Jenny behind the sunset while also feature the same man from the opening.

== Chart performance ==
=== Weekly charts ===
Chart (2014–15)	Peak position
Belgium (Ultratop 50 Flanders)	34
Belgium Dance (Ultratop Flanders)	9
Belgium (Ultratip Bubbling Under Wallonia)	2
Belgium Dance (Ultratop Wallonia)	10
France (SNEP)	50
Germany (GfK)	94
Netherlands (Dutch Top 40)	26
Netherlands (Single Top 100)	27
US Hot Dance/Electronic Songs (Billboard)	33

=== Year-end charts ===
Chart (2015)	Position
US Hot Dance/Electronic Songs (Billboard)	95

== Release history ==
Region	Date	Format	Label
Netherlands	27 October 2014	Digital download	Spinnin'
