= Dzeko & Torres =

Canadian electronic music duo

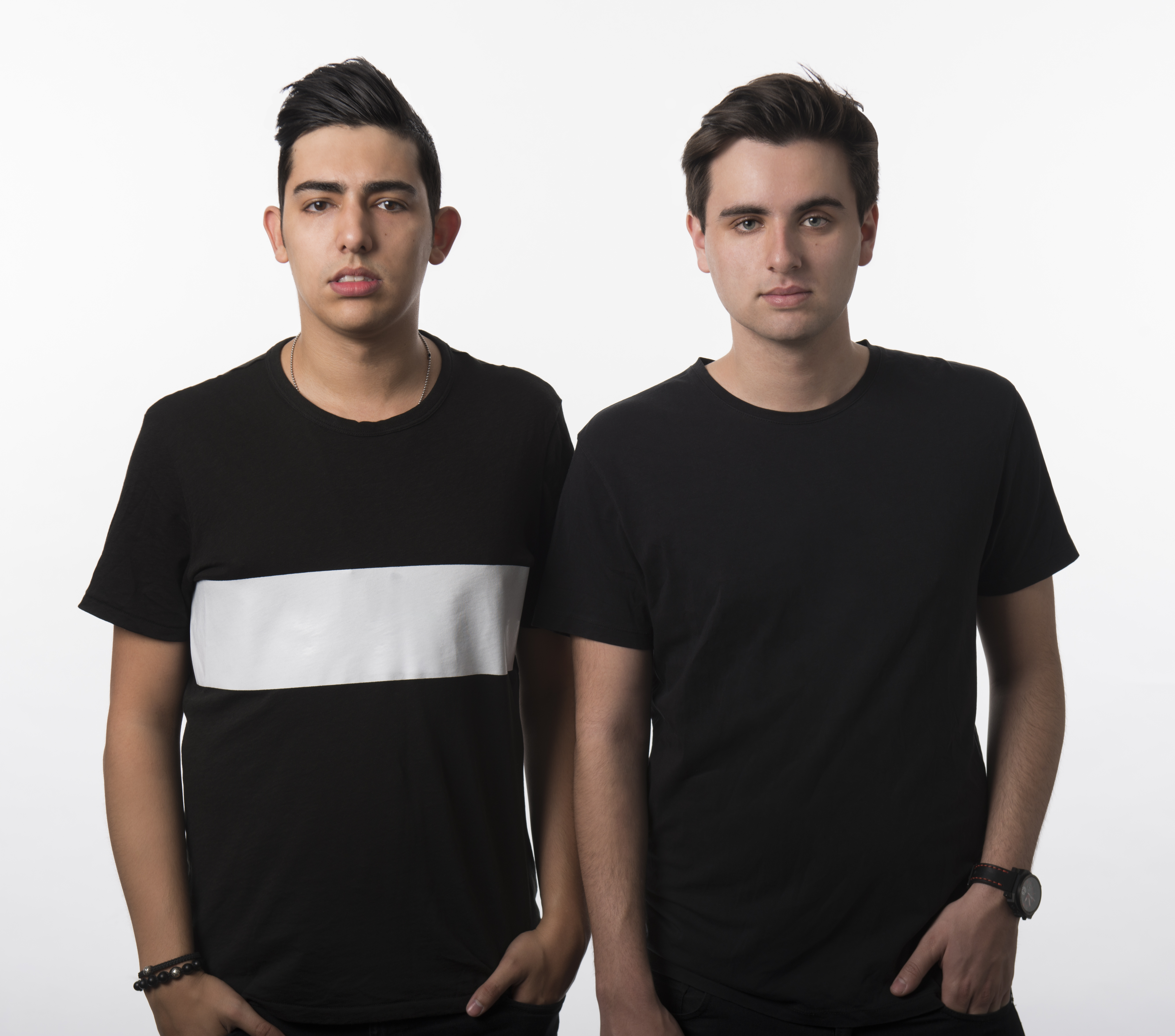

Background information
- Origin: Toronto, Ontario, Canada
- Genres: Electro house; progressive house; big room house
- Years active: 2007–2016
- Label: Spinnin' • Musical Freedom • DOORN Records • Dim Mak • Universal
- Past members: Luis Torres; Julian Dzeko
- Website: dzekoandtorres.com

Dzeko & Torres was a Canadian production and DJ duo based in Toronto, Ontario. Their style was a combination of progressive house and electro, with influences from Avicii, Lazy Rich, Umek, and Alesso.

== History ==
=== 2007–2010 ===
Luis Torres and Julian Dzeko met on an online forum for all-age club events in Toronto. Torres was working as a graphic designer and photographer, while Dzeko was promoting events. Both men learned to mix using FL Studio, with Torres, who taught piano before leaning to produce, also handling keyboards. They started DJing together and co-producing original material; in 2008, they released their single "Confronted" on DJ Chuckie’s Dirty Dutch Digital Vol. 4. Their song "Again" was remixed by Joe Ghost in 2010.

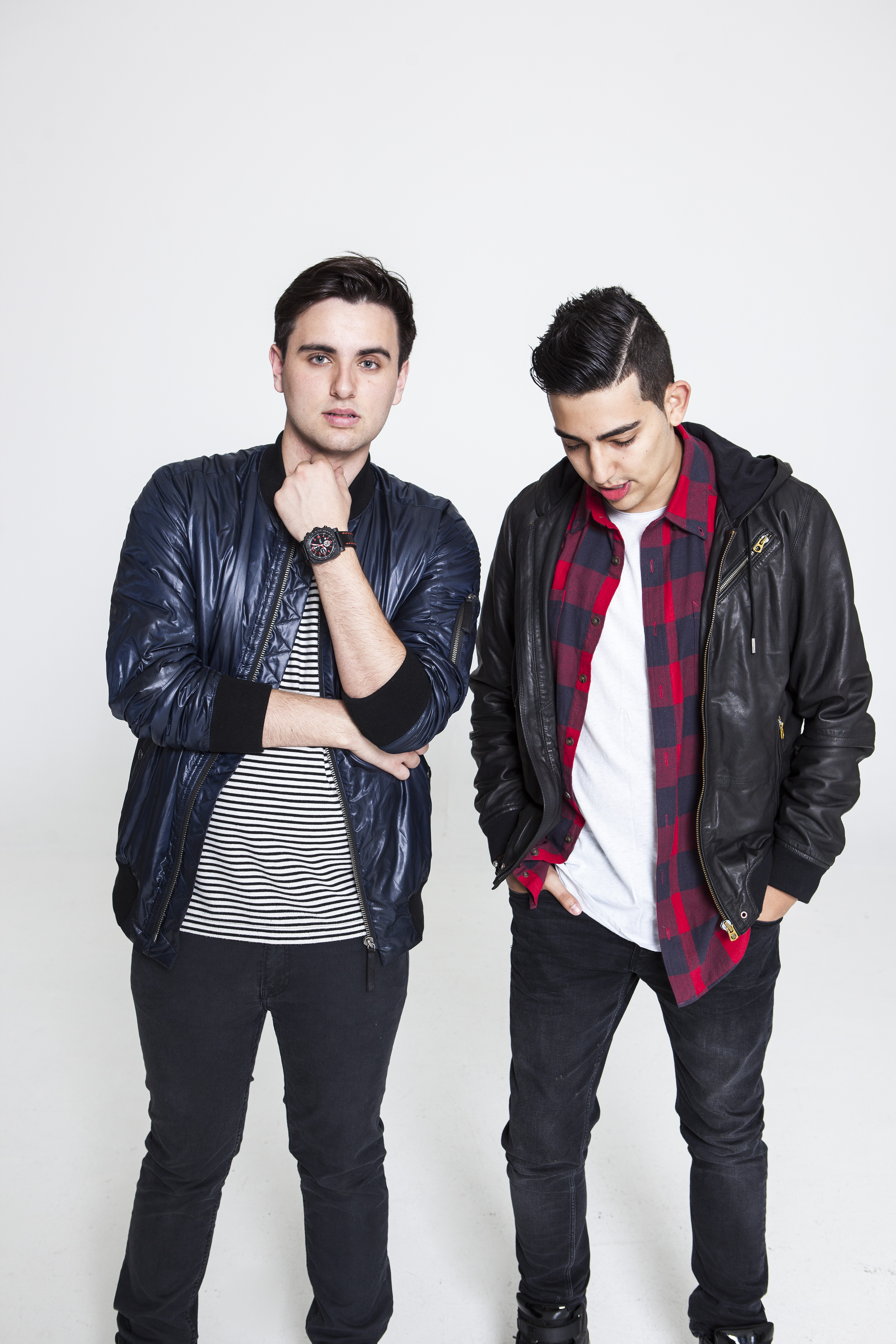
Julian Dzeko and Luis Torres

=== 2012 & Hey EP ===
By January 2012, they had opened for a number of major touring DJs in the Greater Toronto Area, such as Sebastian Ingrosso, Hardwell, Marcus Schossow, Porter Robinson, Erick Morillo, Michael Woods and Quintino. In early 2012 they released an unofficial remix of Of Monsters And Men‘s "King and Lionheart", which reached No. 1 on Hype Machine. Also in 2012, the duo released a remix of Trey Songz "Heart Attack" on Atlantic Records. By late 2012, their tracks had been played on shows such as Tiësto’s Club Life and Paul Oakenfold’s Planet Perfecto. They also premiered an unreleased track, "Togi," on David Guetta's radio show Radio DJ Mix.

Their track "Hey" premiered on Steve Aoki's BBC Radio 1 Essential Mix 2012. Aoki then asked the duo to create a full EP, and that led to the three-track Hey, released on December 18, 2012, on Dim Mak Records. The EP's track "Buppy" first appeared on blogs in late fall of 2012; the third track was "Check This Out", and the EP received favourable reviews. In December 2012, they signed to the AM Only booking agency, and released an official remix of "Strange Attractor" by Animal Kingdom. In January 2013 the duo appeared in the web series The Aoki Files.

External videos
- Dzeko & Torres – Highline (Original Mix) (Dec 40, 2013)
- John Martin – Anywhere For You (Tiësto vs Dzeko & Torres Remix) (March 19, 2014)

By the end of 2012 the band had toured in both Europe and throughout North America. In 2013, they played at The BPM Festival, the Ultra Music Festival and the Winter Music Conference. Other gigs in 2013 included the Chasing Summer Festival, the Electric Zoo Festival in New York City, Coachella, and Tomorrowland.

=== 2013—2016 ===
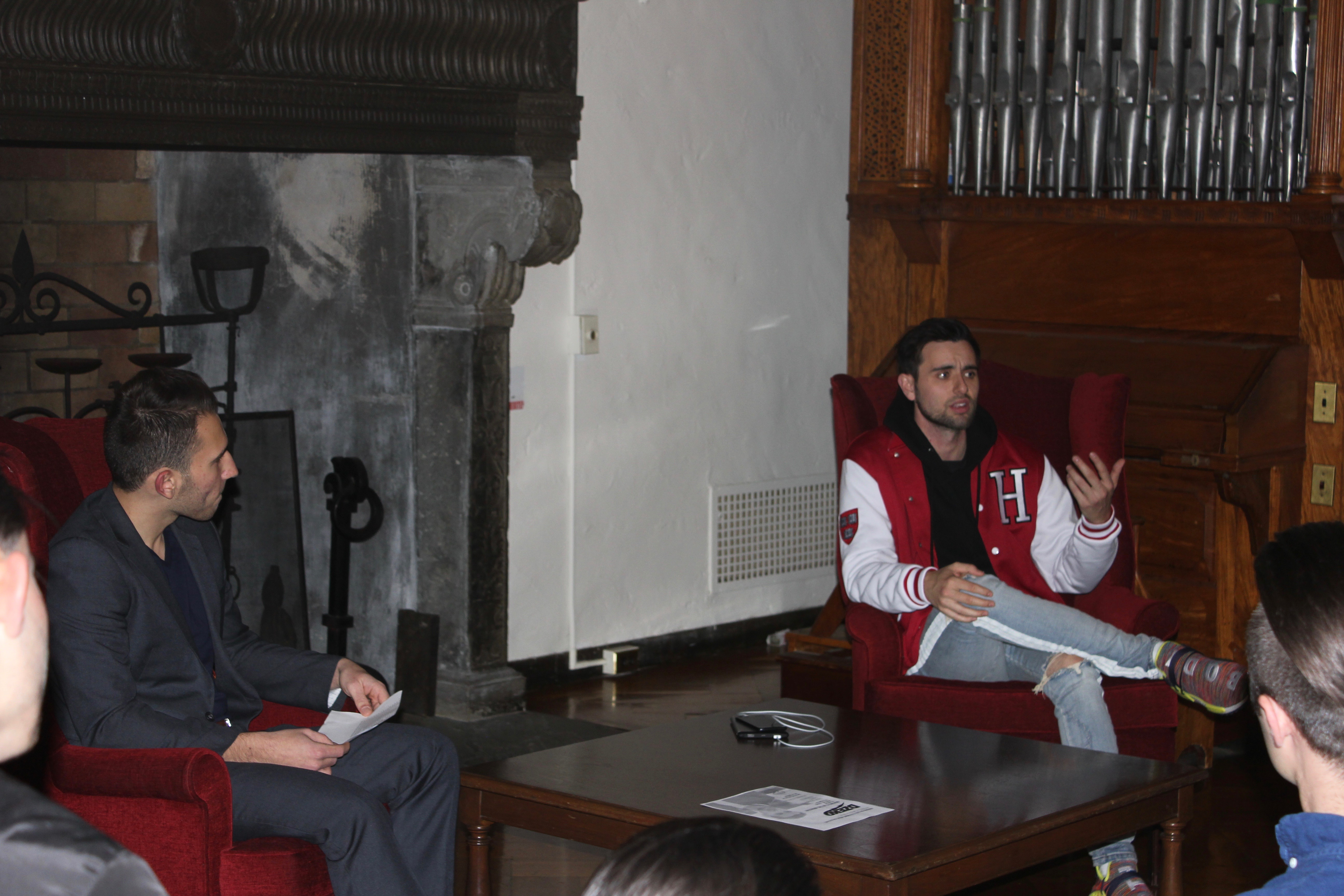
Dzeko lecturing at Harvard University as part of a series for the Harvard College Electronic Music Collective.

In 2013, Dzeko & Torres released their collaborative single "Togi", with Crossways, on Monstercat. In April 2014, they were working with Tiësto's Musical Freedom label, releasing several singles. In 2014, a music video for the Tiësto and Dzeko & Torres Remix of "Anywhere For You" by John Martin was released on YouTube. The video shows scenes from John Martin's original video along with added footage of the DJs in action and lyrics. In February 2014, they returned to Monstercat to release their remix of Pegboard Nerds' "Bassline Kickin'". They continued to tour as of July 2014, performing at the Annual Summer White Party in Salt Lake City.

In 2016, Dzeko and Torres announced that they would be halting their partnership to focus on their solo careers. However, Torres still co-produces Dzeko's solo work, but is uncredited, because Torres didn't want to tour anymore.

In August 2020 however, Torres released his first single as a solo artist titled "Come Down" featuring Mkla.

== Discography ==
=== Extended plays ===
Title	Details
Hey!	Released: December 18, 2012; Label: Dim Mak; Format: Digital download

=== Singles ===
Title	Year	Peak chart positions					Certifications	Album
Title	Year	BEL	FIN	FRA	NL	SWI	Certifications	Album
"Confronted"	2008	–	–	–	–	–		Dirty Dutch Digital Vol. 4.
"Again" (featuring Majid)	2010	–	–	–	–	–		Non-album singles
"Trick Me"	2010	–	–	–	–	–		Non-album singles
"Get F'd Up" (with dBerrie)	2011	–	–	–	–	–		Non-album singles
"Sour"	2011	–	–	–	–	–		Non-album singles
"Friction"	2011	–	–	–	–	–		Non-album singles
"Diamond Rings" (with Jed Harper and Michael Woods)	2012	–	–	–	–	–		Non-album singles
"Y3AH"	2012	–	–	–	–	–		Non-album singles
"Hey"	2012	–	–	–	–	–		Hey!
"Buppy"	2012	–	–	–	–	–		Hey!
"Check This Out"	2012	–	–	–	–	–		Hey!
"Any Day" (with Jus Jack featuring Gallantry)	2013	–	–	–	–	–		Non-album singles
"Togi" (with Crossways)	2013	–	–	–	–	–		Non-album singles
"Hurricane" (with Sarah McLeod)	2013	–	–	–	–	–		Non-album singles
"Down To This" (with Chuckie)	2013	–	–	–	–	–		Non-album singles
"Highline"	2013	–	–	–	–	–		Non-album singles
"Tutankhamun" (with Borgeous)	2014	–	–	–	–	–		Non-album singles
"Ganja" (with MOTi)	2014	–	–	–	–	–		Non-album singles
"Alarm"	2015	–	–	–	–	–		Non-album singles
"Air" (featuring Delaney Jane)	2015	–	–	–	–	–		Non-album singles
"For You" (with Maestro Harrell featuring Delora)	2015	–	–	–	–	–		Non-album singles
"Lose Your Mind" (with Andres Fresko)	2015	–	–	–	–	–		Non-album singles
"Imaginate" (with Kshmr)	2015	–	–	–	–	–		Non-album singles
"L'Amour Toujours" (Tiësto Edit) (featuring Delaney Jane)	2015	37	17	49	92	74		Non-album singles
"Home" (featuring Alex Joseph)	2016	–	–	–	–	–		Non-album singles
"—" denotes a recording that did not chart or was not released.

=== Remixes ===
2010

- Alternative Reality and Christian Planes featuring Crystal – "I Gotta Have Your Love" (Dzeko & Torres Remix)

2011

- Jus Jack featuring Black Dogs – "Can't Wait" (Dzeko & Torres Remix)
- Yug featuring SoJay – "Doin'" (Dzeko & Torres 'What Are We' Remix)"

2012

- Chuckie – "Who Is Ready To Jump" (Dzeko & Torres Remix)
- Animal Kingdom – "Strange Attractor" (Dzeko & Torres Remix)
- Chuckie featuring Amanda Wilson – "Breaking Up" (Dzeko & Torres Remix)

2013

- Steve Aoki featuring Rob Roy – "Ooh" (Dzeko & Torres Remix)
- Capital Cities – "Safe And Sound" (Dzeko & Torres 'Digital Dreamin' Remix)
- Imagine Dragons – "Demons" (Dzeko & Torres 'Sunset' Remix)

2014

- Pegboard Nerds – "Bassline Kickin'" (Dzeko & Torres Remix)
- John Martin – "Anywhere For You" (Tiësto vs. Dzeko & Torres Remix)
- Oh Honey – "Be Okay" (Dzeko & Torres Remix)
- Kiesza – "Hideaway" (Dzeko & Torres Remix)
- Little Daylight – "My Life" (Dzeko & Torres Remix)
- ZHU – "Faded" (Dzeko & Torres Remix)
- Cash Cash – "Surrender" (Dzeko & Torres Remix)

2015

- Odesza featuring Shy Girls – "All We Need" (Dzeko & Torres Remix)
- Zedd featuring Selena Gomez – "I Want You To Know" (Dzeko & Torres vs. Maestro Harrell Remix)
- Kygo featuring Conrad Sewell – "Firestone" (Dzeko & Torres Remix)
- Leona Lewis – "Fire Under My Feet" (Dzeko & Torres Remix)
- The Weeknd – "Can't Feel My Face" (Dzeko & Torres Remix)

2016

- Bright Lights featuring 3lau – "Runaway" (Dzeko & Torres Remix)
- Disco Killerz and Liquid Todd featuring Jimmy Gnecco – "Stellar" (Dzeko & Torres Remix)
