= John Christian (musician) =

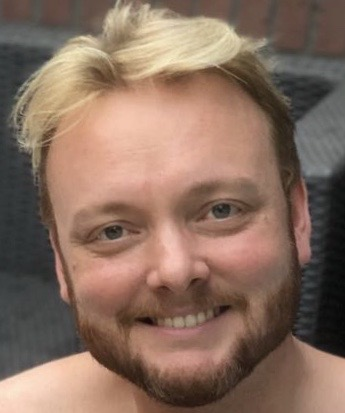

Background information
- Also known as: John Marks
- Born: John Dirne; 14 September 1981 (age 45); Baarn, Netherlands
- Origin: Amsterdam, Netherlands
- Genres: Electro house; progressive house; big room house; future house; trance
- Occupations: Musician; DJ; record producer
- Instruments: Piano; guitar; synthesizer
- Years active: 1998–present
- Labels: White Villa; Musical Freedom; Mainstage Music; Protocol Recordings; Toolroom; Wall Recordings; Freeway; LE7ELS
- Member of: Secret Service; Parla & Pardoux; Team X; Marks & Gates
- Website: johnchristian.nl

John Dirne (born 14 September 1981), known professionally as John Christian and formerly known as John Marks, is a Dutch musician, DJ and record producer. More than a hundred of his productions reached the Top 100.

== Biography ==
His father is also a producer. At a young age, he already knew that he wanted to go into music, although he didn't immediately know in what way. He has been active as a producer since around 1998 and works from his music studio White Villa in Ede. In 2001, he graduated from the Dutch Academy of Music.

He produced for DJs like Eric Dikeb and Mental Theo, for party artists like Gebroeders Ko and De Sjonnies, and Sinterklaas songs for De Club van Sinterklaas. Meanwhile, he works for domestic and international artists in the club scene.

He also releases his own music, both solo as John Marks (2004-2009) and John Christian (since 2009), and with others in Secret Service (2002), Parla & Pardoux (2004-2008), Team X (2005) and Marks & Gates (2006). Furthermore, he recorded music with Gerard Joling, René Froger, Gordon, The Moon and Patricia Paay, among others. In addition, he is also involved as a music producer and as a member of the creative team at De Toppers' concerts.

More than one hundred singles reached the Top 100, seven of which were in the Top 10.

Under the alias John Christian, he was unveiled in January 2013 with his remix of Avicii and Nicky Romero's "I Could Be the One" which entered the top 100 established by Beatport.

In November 2015, he founded his own record label called Freeway Recordings.

== Discography ==
=== EPs ===
Title	Detail	Peak chart position
Title	Detail	NLD
Liberté (The 2002 Remixes)	Released: 2002; Label: Double Dance Records; Format: Digital download, CD	21

=== Charted singles ===
==== As Parla & Pardoux (with Maurice van Woensel) ====
Title	Year	Peak chart position	Album
Title	Year	NLD	Album
"Liberté"	2000	42	Liberté (The 2002 Remixes)
"Jump & Let's Party" (versus DJ Galaga)	2001	29	Non-album singles
"Forever and Ever" (featuring Denize)	2002	20	Non-album singles
"Close Your Eyes"	2004	19	Non-album singles
"Viva la Revolution"	2008	23	Viva la Revolution - EP
"Liberté" (DJ Maurice featuring Parla & Pardoux)	2014	61	Non-album single

==== As Secret Service (with Maurice van Woensel) ====
Title	Year	Peak chart position	Album
Title	Year	NLD	Album
"Cry"	2002	50	Non-album single

==== As Team X (with Roy Gates) ====
Title	Year	Peak chart position	Album
Title	Year	NLD	Album
"Pump Up"	2005	42	Non-album singles
"X-Vision"	2006	49	Non-album singles
"Popcorn"	2008	67	Non-album singles

==== As John Marks ====
Title	Year	Peak chart position	Album
Title	Year	NLD	Album
"Tracking"	2004	86	Non-album singles
"Don't Stop"	2004	38	Non-album singles
"Update"	2005	33	Non-album singles
"Do It Again"	2005	45	Non-album singles
"Carnival"	2006	20	Non-album singles
"Insanity"	2007	17	Non-album singles
"Can You Feel It?" (De Toppers featuring John Marks)	2007	10	Non-album singles
"Blow the Speakers" (versus The Moon)	2007	67	Non-album singles
"What Do You Say" (featuring Blain)	2008	13	Non-album singles
"Summerbreeze (Official Anthem)"	2008	29	Non-album singles
"Sledgehammer" (featuring René Froger)	2009	22	Non-album singles
"Who's That Lady with My Man '09" (featuring Patricia Paay)	2009	83	Non-album singles

==== As John Christian ====
Title	Year	Peak chart position	Album
Title	Year	BEL (Vl)	Album
"Still The Same Man" (Nicky Romero featuring John Christian and Nilson)	2013	16^{[A]}	Non-album singles
"Gunshot"	2013	7^{[A]}	Non-album singles

=== Singles ===
==== As John Christian ====
- 2013: Flight 643
- 2013: Gunshot
- 2014: Speed Of Light (with Sem Thomasson)
- 2014: Pinball (with Shermanology and Oliver Rosa)
- 2014: Samba (with Klauss Goulart)
- 2015: Collage (with Arin Tone and Corey James)
- 2015: What
- 2015: Down (with Volt & State)
- 2015: Brothers (featuring Eric Lumiere)
- 2015: Hit 'M Like This (with Jacky Greco)
- 2016: Flux (with Mantrastic)
- 2016: Infinity 2016 (Tribute) (with Arin Tone)
- 2016: Glance To The Future (with TripL featuring Jessy Katz)
- 2016: House Of God (with Arin Tone)
- 2016: Where Is The Party
- 2016: Don't Come Back (with Djs From Mars)
- 2017: The Grimm
- 2017: Iconic (with Nicky Romero)
- 2017: The Sign
- 2017: Scream (with Tiësto)
- 2017: Back To The Oldskool
- 2017: Funkastarz
- 2018: I Like It Loud (with Tiësto featuring Marshall Masters and The Ultimate MC)
- 2018: The Trip
- 2018: The House Is Mine
- 2019: Let's Get This Thing Started
- 2019: Can You Feel It (with Tiësto)
- 2019: Uno
- 2019: Technoprime (with Tony Junior)
- 2020: Dos
- 2022: Rain (with Elize)
- 2025: All Night (with Armin Van Buuren)

=== Remixes ===
==== As John Christian ====
- 2013: Nicky Romero and Avicii - "I Could Be the One" (John Christian Remix)
- 2015: MOTi - "Valencia" (John Christian Remix) (Intro Edit) [Included in the compilation of Tiësto, Club Life: Volume Four New York City]
- 2016: Andrea Rullo - "Alpha Centauri" (John Christian Edit)
- 2017: Tiësto and Diplo - "C'Mon" (John Christian Remix)
- 2017: Vavo and Redhead Roman featuring Max Landry - "We Have Won" (John Christian Edit)
- 2017: Dave Aude and Luciana - "Yeah Yeah 2017" (John Christian Remix)
- 2018: John Christian - "What" (2018 Edit)
- 2018: Fedde Le Grand - "Monsta" (John Christian Remix)
- 2019: Tiësto - "Grapevine" (John Christian Remix)
- 2019: Trobi - "We Can Change (Infinity)" (John Christian Remix)
- 2019: Mattn, Klaas and Roland Clark - "Children" (John Christian Remix)
- 2019: Madonna, Maluma - "Medellín" (John Christian & DJLW Remix)
