= Secrets (Tiësto and Kshmr song) =

Single by Tiësto and Kshmr featuring Vassy

from the album Club Life, Vol. 4 - New York City
- Released: 16 March 2015
- Genre: Big room house
- Length: 3:39 (radio edit); 4:27 (extended mix)
- Label: Musical Freedom; Spinnin'; PM:AM; Universal
- Songwriters: Tijs Verwest; Niles Hollowell-Dhar; Vasiliki Karagiorgos; Phil Bentley
- Producers: Tiësto; Kshmr

Tiësto singles chronology
"Light Years Away" (2014)	"Secrets" (2015)	"The Only Way Is Up" (2015)

Kshmr singles chronology
"Dead Mans Hand" (2015)	"Secrets" (2015)	"JAMMU" (2015)

Vassy singles chronology
"Today" (2014)	"Secrets" (2015)	"Satisfied" (2015)

Music video
- "Secrets" on YouTube

"Secrets" is a song by Dutch DJ Tiësto and American producer Kshmr, featuring vocals from Australian singer Vassy. The song was released on 16 March 2015 through Musical Freedom, while distribution was handled by Universal Music. A music video was later published through the Spinnin' Records YouTube channel on 18 March, as well as uploaded to Tiësto's Vevo channel on 9 April. The track was featured on Tiësto's 2015 mixed compilation album Club Life: Volume Four New York City.

== Reviews ==
Fabien Dori from French webmedia Guettapen recognizes the quality of the track : "they are still some good big room releases. That new collaboration of Tiësto and Kshmr, gone with Vassy vocals, is just enjoyable. It makes pleasure to hear some big room tracks as well produced as 'Secrets'."

== Music video ==
The music video was directed by Robert Schober and takes place in a futuristic universe of Cyberpunk type. It features a man and a woman entering an abandoned games store. They repair the games and use the batteries on their bugs on their necks. This gives them the power to activate games by touching them, such as a motorcycle game and laser shooting guns. When they were playing the laser shooting gun game, the man sees a safe and discovers some money inside of it. The woman sees the man stealing the money, and is very disappointed in him and activates the alarm. Shocked at the alarm, he exits the store to find the police rounding the store. Actually, the man is wearing a VR headset and the woman is his wife, sleeping in bed next to him.

== Tracklist ==
Digital download (MF120)

1. "Secrets" – 4:27

Digital download (MF131)

1. "Secrets" (Don Diablo's VIP Mix) – 4:19

Digital download (PM:AM)

1. "Secrets" (Radio Edit) – 3:36

Digital download / Remixes (PM:AM)

1. "Secrets" (Future house Extended) – 3:20
2. "Secrets" (Don Diablo Remix) – 4:15
3. "Secrets" (Don Diablo's VIP Mix) – 4:19
4. "Secrets" (David Zowie Remix) – 4:58
5. "Secrets" (Felon Remix) – 5:02
6. "Secrets" (ZAXX & Jaylex Remix) – 3:19
7. "Secrets" (Riggi & Piros Remix) – 3:38

2017 7" blue vinyl

1. "Secrets" (Extended Mix) – 4:27
2. "Secrets" (Radio Edit) – 3:37

== Credits and personnel ==
- Songwriting – Tijs Verwest, Niles Hollowell-Dhar, Vasiliki Karagiorgos, Phil Bentley
- Production – Tiësto, Kshmr
- Vocals – VASSY
- Label: Musical Freedom / Spinnin' Records

== Charts ==
=== Weekly charts ===
Chart (2015)	Peak position
Austria (Ö3 Austria Top 40)	55
Belgium Dance (Ultratop Flanders)	24
Belgium (Ultratip Bubbling Under Flanders)	28
Belgium Airplay (Ultratop Wallonia)	30
Belgium (Ultratop 50 Wallonia)	32
Belgium Dance (Ultratop Wallonia)	2
Canada Hot 100 (Billboard)	68
CIS Airplay (TopHit)	44
Finland (Suomen virallinen lista)	17
France (SNEP)	27
Hungary (Stream Top 40)	18
Netherlands (Dutch Top 40)	26
Netherlands (Single Top 100)	21
Norway (VG-lista)	11
Poland Airplay (ZPAV)	18
Poland (Polish Airplay New)	1
Poland (Dance Top 50)	1
Russia Airplay (TopHit)	39
Scottish Singles Sales (Official Charts)	56
Sweden (Sverigetopplistan)	24
Switzerland (Schweizer Hitparade)	31
Ukraine Airplay (TopHit)	21
UK Singles (OCC)	140
UK Dance (Official Charts)	40
US Dance Club Songs (Billboard)	35
US Hot Dance/Electronic Songs (Billboard)	15

=== Monthly charts ===
Monthly chart performance
Chart (2015)	Peak position
Ukraine Airplay (TopHit)	38

=== Year-end charts ===
Chart (2015)	Position
France (SNEP)	126
Netherlands (Single Top 100)	94
Sweden (Sverigetopplistan)	90
Ukraine Airplay (TopHit)	139
US Hot Dance/Electronic Songs (Billboard)	40

== Certifications ==
Region	Certification	Certified units/sales
Denmark (IFPI Danmark)	Gold	45,000^{‡}
Germany (BVMI)	Gold	200,000^{‡}
Italy (FIMI)	Gold	25,000^{‡}
New Zealand (RMNZ)	Gold	15,000^{‡}
Poland (ZPAV)	Gold	25,000^{‡}
United Kingdom (BPI)	Silver	200,000^{‡}
United States (RIAA)	Gold	500,000^{‡}
^{‡} Sales+streaming figures based on certification alone.
