= Tigerlily (DJ) =

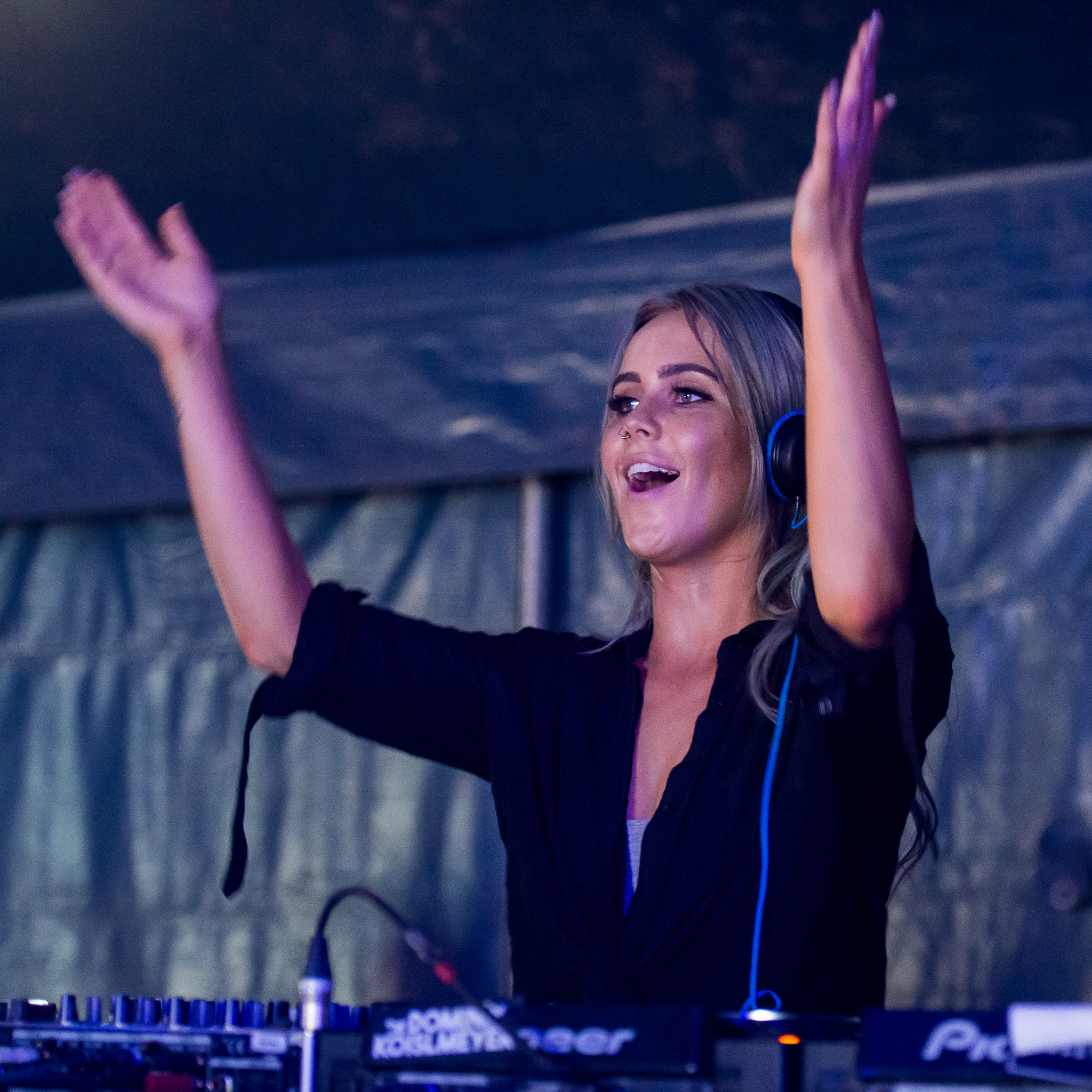

Background information
- Born: Dara Kristen Hayes; 27 March 1992 (age 34)
- Origin: Sydney, Australia
- Genre: EDM
- Occupations: DJ, producer
- Years active: 2011‒present
- Label: Universal Music

Dara Kristen Hayes (born 27 March 1992), known as Tigerlily, is an Australian DJ and record producer born in Sydney.

Tigerlily has two sisters, Georgina Hayes who is a lifestyle blogger, and Greta Hayes, who is a professional hockey player for the Hockeyroos.

== Biography ==
From the age of 4 she attended music school, and she started DJing at the age of 18. She completed a Bachelor of Media and Communications majoring in Marketing and Sociology at the University of Sydney. She was the runner up in the 2011 Your Shot DJ competition and was voted the 9th DJ of 2013 within the InTheMix Awards. Her 2015 single, "Paradise", reached #67 on the ARIA singles chart.

Tigerlily has performed in various festival and club stages both in Australia and internationally, including Hakkasan in Las Vegas, Echostage in Washington D.C., Create Nightclub in Los Angeles, Club Octagon in Seoul, Tomorrowland in Belgium, Lollapalooza in Sweden and the Main Stage of Ultra Music Festival and Electric Zoo New York City.

Tigerlily's music is currently being released through Island Records in Australia and Casablanca Records in the USA which are both a division of Universal Music Group.

In addition to focusing on her DJ career, she runs a podcast Team Tiger Radio that has been airing since 2018, and has been in publications such as Women's Health, Teen Vogue, GQ, Galore, Ladygun, Girlfriend and Cosmopolitan. She is also an ambassador for JBL, Samsung, and Adidas.

In April 2019 Tigerlily was cast in Ford Like You Meant It four-episode mini series, alongside Australian model and Muay Thai fighter Lilian Dikmans, World Champion surfer Harley Ingleby, and podcaster Matt Purcell.

In February 2021, Tigerlily collaborated with Luke Millanta to create a cosmetic Tigerlily player skin for the 2019 survival horror game, Resident Evil 2.

== Personal life ==
Tigerlily is a vegan. She is also a passionate animal rights and environmental ambassador. She has featured in PETA and Animal Liberation campaigns to promote her plant-based lifestyle.

She is extremely active in the philanthropic community, often found speaking at, or fundraising for charity organisations. Recently, Tigerlily helped raise over $500,000 for the Australian bushfires and is a regular volunteer at animal sanctuaries around Australia.

In March 2021, Tigerlily announced her engagement to her long-term boyfriend.

On 5 March 2022, she married her long-term boyfriend Scott.

On 3 November, 2022, Tigerlilly announced her pregnancy.

In July 2026, she announced she was pregnant with her 3rd child.

== Discography ==
=== Singles ===
- 2013: Zombie
- 2014: Faith (with 2Less)
- 2014: Daylight (with The Only)
- 2015: Paradise (ft. Meghan Kabir)
- 2015: Feel The Love (featuring Nat Dunn)
- 2016: Whenever I'm With You
- 2016: Ciao Baby
- 2016: Invisible Children (with Kshmr)
- 2017: Ashes
- 2017: Spice Temple (with Dimatik)
- 2018: Kickboom (with Luciana)
- 2018: Agony (with MorganJ)
- 2020: Take U Back (with Jebu)
- 2020: Get Down
- 2020: Whistle (with RICCI)
- 2020: Me, You & Tequila (with Aydan)

=== Remixes ===
- 2018: Mashd N Kutcher and Sammi Constantine - "Need Me" (Tigerlily Remix)
- 2018: Sunset Bros and Mark McCabe - "I'm Feeling It (In The Air)" (Tigerlily Remix)
- 2019: Cheat Codes and Trixxie — "All of My Life" (Tigerlily Remix)
- 2020: Danko - "Pump It Up" (Tigerlily, Rudeejay & Da Brozz Remix)
- 2020: Brittany Maggs - "Underneath the Sheets" (Tigerlily Remix)
