= Moti (DJ) =

Dutch DJ and record producer

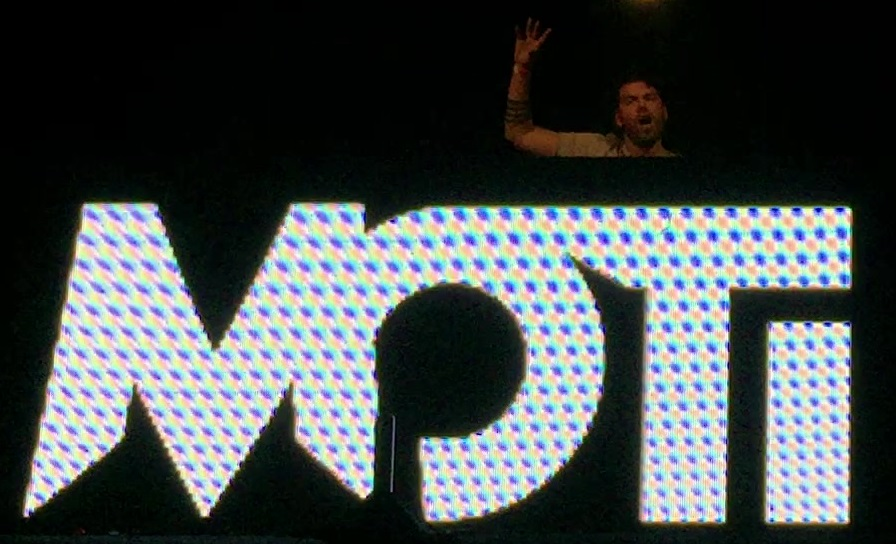
- Moti performing at Airbeat One Festival 2016

Background information
- Born: Timotheus Romme; March 23, 1987 (age 39); Amsterdam, Netherlands
- Genres: Electro house; EDM; Dutch house; progressive house; big room house; future house
- Occupations: Musician; DJ; record producer
- Instruments: Logic Pro; synthesizer; piano; drum machine; guitar
- Years active: 2008–present
- Labels: Spinnin' Records; Revealed Recordings; Musical Freedom; Doorn Records; Wall Recordings; Heldeep Records; Hexagon; Universal; Zero Cool Records
- Website: MOTiOfficial.com

Timotheus "Timo" Romme (born 23 March 1987), better known by his stage name Moti (stylized as MOTi), is a Dutch electro house DJ and music producer from Amsterdam. MOTi's first release was "Circuits" in 2012, which was published on Afrojack's Wall Recordings. By the end 2012, MOTi had been commissioned for official remixes of Flo Rida, Tiësto and Far East Movement. MOTi frequently releases singles on Spinnin Records and Tiësto's Musical Freedom label; he has collaborated with artists such as Tiësto, Major Lazer and Dzeko & Torres. His 2014 collaboration with Martin Garrix, "Virus (How About Now)", reached No. 27 on the Dutch Single Top 100. Frequently on tour, MOTi has performed at major festivals such as the Amsterdam Dance Event, Creamfields UK, Nocturnal Wonderland and Tomorrowland.

== Early life ==
Timotheus "Timo" Romme was born on 23 March 1987 in Amsterdam, Netherlands, where he spent his childhood. He started learning mixing for fun after a friend sold him some turntables, and by the age of 18 he was deejaying. Romme studied to be a fashion designer at The Hague in the Netherlands. In 2015, he explained that "after a few years [at university], I noticed I liked music more than fashion. I don't really follow the trends." MOTi started producing music in 2005, stating "the guys at the record store told me I couldn’t cut breaks out of records, so I decided to make my own music." He started his music career performing Dutch house with his cousin as a duo called Groovenatics.

== Music career ==
=== 2007-12: "Circuits" and remixes ===
MOTi's first official release was the track "Circuits," a collaboration with Dutch DJ Quintino. Released through Afrojack's Wall Recordings on April 16, 2012, the track gained significant radio play on Radio 538 in the Netherlands, among other stations. In September 2012, MOTi released "Kinky Denise," another Quintino collaboration published through Wall Recordings. By the end 2012, MOTi had been commissioned for official remixes of Flo Rida, Tiësto, and Far East Movement. Tiësto also added "Circuits" to his 2012 Dance RED Save Lives compilation, which resulted in Tiësto and MOTi connecting through Twitter and starting to collaborate.

=== 2013: Musical Freedom and Spinnin' Records ===
He released "Krack!", his first single through Spinnin Records, on March 8, 2013. The electro house track entered the Beatport Top 100. Afterwards, MOTi released an official remix for "Next To Me," a single by Emili Sande. MOTi's single "NaNaNa" with Alvaro was released through Hysteria Recs on June 3, 2013. On June 25, 2013, he collaborated with Tiësto on "Back To The Acid," which would be his first release through Musical Freedom. Stated MOTi about the track's effect on his career, "Tiësto has a really good feel of what he likes and there’s a lot of studio tricks on that track that people who don’t produce won’t even understand or hear. It was an important project to show my technical skills and, of course, a big audience got to see my name next to his.”

MOTi remixed "Hello (MOTi Remix)" by the Stafford Brothers in 2013, which stayed at No. 1 on Beatport's Hip Hop chart for around two months. MOTi ended 2013 with several singles released on Spinnin, including "Dynamite" with Quintino in September, and "Heat It Up" in November. "Dynamite" peaked at #10 on the Beatport Top 100. He signed with Tiësto's Red Light Management at the end of 2013. Shortly afterwards, he performed at an Amsterdam Dance Event Heineken showcase. Stated MOTi about the performance, "that gig was the big turning point where it got serious. It felt natural. It felt like I’m meant to do this.”

=== 2014: "Virus" and touring ===
MOTi's track "Don't Go Lose It", released on February 10, 2014, through Musical Freedom, reached the Beatport Top 100. The track was followed by the DVBBS collaboration "This Is Dirty" in April, which peaked at #2 on the Electro House Chart. The single was followed by the MOTi track "Crash" with Quintino in July, and "Zeus" with Kenneth G in September.

After first befriending Martin Garrix in 2011, the two began collaborating on a new project in 2014. Explained MOTi, "I think we were on Skype and I was working on 'Virus,' and Martin really liked the first idea I had made and the melody of the drop. He added his sick breakdown to it, and we finished the track together." October 2014 saw the release of "Virus (How About Now)" through Spinnin, which reached #1 on the Beatport 100. The track also did well on international song charts, reaching No. 27 on the Dutch Single Top 100 chart, No. 34 on Ultratop in Belgium, No. 50 on the Syndicat National de l'Édition Phonographique chart in France, No. 94 on the GfK Entertainment in German, and No. 24 on the Billboard Top Dance Songs chart.

MOTi played at a number of electronic dance music festivals in the summer of 2014. starting with Ultra Music Festival Miami. In July 2014, he played at the Hakkasan club in Las Vegas, while other gigs included Electric Daisy Carnival Las Vegas, Creamfields UK, Nocturnal Wonderland, and Tomorrowland. MOTi embarked on his #LION tour in November 2014, with plans to hit various North American cities such as New York City and Los Angeles. It was his first tour as sole headliner. MOTi's track "Lion" came out on November 17, 2014, and was his last release for the year.

=== 2015–2018: Recent projects ===
MOTi continued to release singles on both Spinnin and Musical Freedom into 2015. His first single of the year, "Ganja," was a collaboration with Dzeko & Torres. In February, MOTi and Tiësto released the collaborative single "Blow Your Mind", which reached No. 1 on the Electro House Charts. After the May release of "Valencia" on Musical Freedom, singles he released that summer included "Spack Jarrow" with W&W and "Ghost in the Machine" with Jonathan Mendelsohn.

He collaborated with Major Lazer on the song "Boom" later that year. Released through Mad Decent on November 20, 2015, the track included features by Ty Dolla Sign, Kranium & Wizkid. According to DJ Mag, the track incorporates "dancehall, future bass and hip hop." Also on November 20, 2015, MOTi released "Lost," a collaboration with Sander van Doorn on Spinnin Records. MOTi premiered the track at EDC Las Vegas 2015. In 2015, he was named to the DJ Mag Top 101-150 DJs 2015 list at No. 117. MOTi was featured in the Bassjackers and Joe Ghost "On The Floor Like," which was released on March 25, 2016.

=== 2018–present: Zero Cool records ===
In November 2018, MOTi founded his own independent record label: Zero Cool. He wanted to create a more inclusive label, where popularity didn't come in the way of music:

"At some point it felt like I wasn’t producing the records I wanted to produce, but instead what the A&Rs wanted me to create. I think everyone has a moment in their career where you just want to create whatever you feel like creating, and for me this was it. On my label Zero Cool it doesn’t matter what the new trend or hype is, how big your Instagram or Spotify profile is… if it’s good, I’ll release it. That’s why it’s called Zero Cool, it’s for everyone!"

One year after its creation, Zero Cool reached a 100 million streams on Spotify.

== Musical style ==
External videos
- Sander van Doorn & MOTi - "Lost" Official Music Video - Jan 25, 2016

Incorporating diverse genres such as electro house, progressive house, hip hop, and others, MOTi has cited artists such as Jimi Hendrix, Alter Ego and Derrick May as musical inspirations. About his musical intent, he stated in 2016 that "for the club tracks I just want people to have a good time and party to the music. For the slower tracks or less clubby tracks I hope people get carried away by it when they play it at home."

== Awards and nominations ==
Year	Award	Nominated work	Category	Result
2015	DJ Mag	MOTi	Top 101-150 DJs	117

== See also ==
- List of house musicians
