= Kshmr =

American musician, songwriter, DJ and record producer (born 1988)

- Kshmr in 2019

Background information
- Also known as: Cyrano; The MVI; Dreamz
- Born: Niles Hollowell-Dhar; October 6, 1988 (age 38); Berkeley, California, U.S.
- Genres: Electro house; progressive house; future house; future bounce; big room house; psytrance
- Occupations: Musician; songwriter; DJ; record producer
- Years active: 2003–present
- Labels: Spinnin'; Dharma; Musical Freedom; Revealed; Republic
- Website: welcometokshmr.com

Niles Hollowell-Dhar (born October 6, 1988), known professionally as Kshmr (pronounced "Kashmir" and stylized in all caps), is an American musician, DJ, songwriter, record producer, former rapper and singer who came to prominence as a member of the production team the Cataracs under the stage name Cyrano. He was ranked 23rd on DJ Mag's 2015 Top 100 DJs poll and was awarded highest new entry for the year. In the same poll he elevated to 12th in 2016 and 2017, and again in 2020. He was ranked 11th in the same poll in 2021; and in 2022 in same poll he ranked 12. In July 2017, he launched Dharma Worldwide, a sublabel of Spinnin' Records. Kshmr performed live at many music festivals like Coachella, Tomorrowland, EDC, Ultra and Sunburn.

== Early life ==
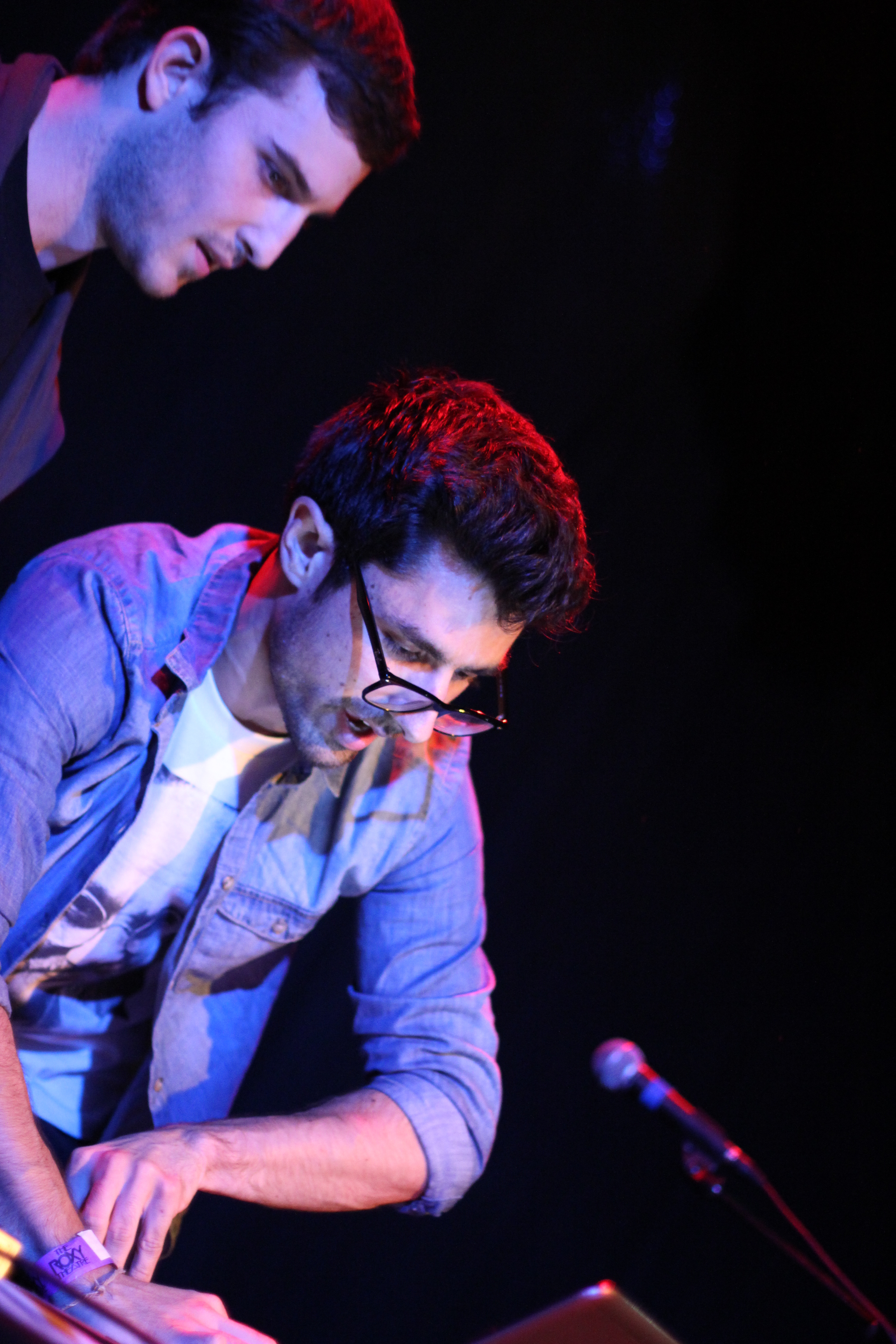
Hollowell-Dhar and David Singer-Vine performing as the Cataracs in 2010

Hollowell-Dhar was born in Berkeley, California. His father is a Kashmiri Pandit who emigrated from India, while his mother is American. He got his stage name from Jammu and Kashmir, where his paternal side hails from. His singles "Jammu" and "Kashmir" also derive their names from the state.

== Career ==
=== 2003–2013: The Cataracs ===
Hollowell-Dhar was originally part of the hip-hop production duo the Cataracs with high school friend David Singer-Vine, releasing hits such as "Like a G6" with Far East Movement and "Bass Down Low" with DEV, and co-producing others such as Selena Gomez's second song off her debut album Stars Dance. Following Singer-Vine's departure from the duo in 2012, Hollowell-Dhar continued producing music with the name the Cataracs until 2014.

Before he released songs under Kshmr, he co-produced tracks like 'Tsunami' by DVBBS and Borgeous, as well as 'Stampede' by Dimitri Vegas & Like Mike, Dvbbs, and Borgeous.

=== 2014: Transition into Kshmr ===
In 2014, Hollowell-Dhar started making electro house music under the alias of Kshmr. Under this name, he charted on Beatport. Hollowell-Dhar released his first single "Megalodon" on February 24, 2014, through Spinnin' Records. A Kshmr and R3hab collaboration resulted in the single "Karate" that charted in SNEP in March 2015. Most of Hollowell-Dhar's songs are released under Spinnin' Records. Hollowell-Dhar started raising attention when his single "Burn", a collaboration with DallasK, debuted on the Top 40 chart on Beatport and eventually reached No. 1. The song has been released on 3 labels: Revealed Recordings, Spinnin' Records, and Ultra Records.

=== 2015: Secrets ===
Until Hollowell-Dhar was introduced at Ultra Music Festival 2015 by Tiësto, his identity was relatively unknown. His song, "Secrets", a collaboration with Tiësto and Vassy was largely successful, streaming through buzz charts, and reaching the top of the Beatport Chart. In June 2015, Hollowell-Dhar announced he would host with Spinnin' Records a remix contest for his track "Jammu" – the first prize being a collaboration with Hollowell-Dhar on a new track. The contest was held on Spinnin Records' Talent Pool platform, and the first place went to Kyfra, who won the collaboration with Hollowell-Dhar. In July 2015, Hollowell-Dhar released his highly anticipated debut sound pack exclusively with Splice Sounds. After the contest, Hollowell-Dhar announced his first live performance, at the Fonda Theater, Los Angeles, which took place on September 19, 2015.

=== 2016: The Lion Across the Field ===
He released his first EP, "The Lion Across the Field" on May 13, 2016. On July 23, 2016, he performed his first set in the Tomorrowland music festival, on the mainstage. On September 5, 2016, he collaborated with Tigerlily to release his new single, "Invisible Children". Hollowell-Dhar said "The project was already a great start. I added my ideas and it came together pretty quickly. The name comes from a term referring to slum kids in India and places around the world where poverty is so rampant that people begin to stop noticing". Two weeks later, he was awarded "Best Live Act" category on DJ Mag 2016. His place elevated from 23rd to 12th in DJ Mag's 2016 Top 100 DJs list. On October 24, 2016, he collaborated with Bassjackers to release their single "Extreme" featuring Sidnie Tipton via Spinnin' Records. In an emailed statement, Bassjackers said "Besides a musical connection, we also developed a friendship outside of music. We think that friendship contributes to what makes this song so special". In October 2016, he released his new song with Will Sparks titled "Voices" as a free download on Spinnin' Premium.

=== 2017: Dharma Worldwide and Power ===
In March 2017, Hollowell-Dhar released "Back To Me" with Crossnaders featuring Micky Blue. He performed at Ultra Music Festival on March 24, 2017, with Timmy Trumpet and played with live musicians throughout the whole set for the first time in his career, as he wrote:

This was a special show for me, playing with live musicians throughout the whole set for the first time in my career. Respect to them and my good friend Timmy Trumpet for stopping by and bringing his magic as well.

On June 16, 2017, "Harder", a collaboration between Hollowell-Dhar and Tiësto, was released via Spinnin' Records. The first song released via Kshmr's label, Dharma Worldwide, was "Festival of Lights", a collaboration with Maurice West. "Festival of Lights" is heavily based on Indian culture. Within a week, Hollowell-Dhar released "Kolkata" on July 28, 2017, a collaboration with JDG and Mariana BO on Dharma. He also played at the mainstage of Tomorrowland 2017 on July 29, a day after releasing "Kolkata". "Divination", a collaboration between Hollowell-Dhar and Dutch duo No Mondays was released on August 4, 2017. "The Serpent" was released on the same day as a collaboration with Snails. On September 22, 2017, Hollowell-Dhar released "Power" with Hardwell on Spinnin' Records. Hollowell-Dhar collaborated with Bollywood singer Sonu Nigam for track "Underwater" which was released on October 13, 2017, on his label Dharma Worldwide. On December 1, 2017, Hollowell-Dhar released "Islands" on Dharma Worldwide with electro house producer R3HAB. Within the same month, Hollowell-Dhar worked with producers Marnik and the Golden Army to release a psytrance influenced big room house track titled "Shiva" on December 29, 2017.

=== 2018: House of Cards, Carry Me Home, and Magic ===
Kshmr released "House Of Cards" on February 16, 2018, which features Sidnie Tipton, who provided vocals to "Wildcard". Lacking Hollowell-Dhar's notable big room elements, the track is influenced by pop and acoustic components such as guitar riffs in the song's break. He also played the mainstage of Ultra Music Festival Miami with a set presenting new tracks and many of his well-known productions. On May 18, 2018, Hollowell-Dhar released "Doonka" which incorporates elements of both big room and trap music as a free download with Mr.Black. Hollowell-Dhar collaborated with Jake Reese to release "Carry Me Home" on June 15, 2018, a progressive house song originally premiered at his 2018 Ultra Music Festival performance. Commenting on the track's production, Hollowell-Dhar stated, "Carry Me Home started with the drop melody. I was scared I wouldn't find a vocal I loved just as much, but Jake Reese and [co-writer Joren van der Voort] blew me away with what they wrote." He released Greek-influenced single "Opa" with Dimitri Vegas & Like Mike on July 22, 2018, and "Neverland" with 7 Skies on August 3, 2018, which combined elements from the genres of bounce and big room house. The duo had previously worked together on a sample pack titled Symphony-Serum Hybrid Orchestra on music creation platform Splice. His next single titled "Good Vibes Soldier", co-produced with Israeli psytrance duo Vini Vici and comprising elements of reggaeton and rap, was released on August 24, 2018. On November 2, 2018, he released big room single "Magic", which features uncredited vocals by Vassy. Dancing Astronaut lauded the track as a return to Hollowell-Dhar's older era sound, together with its vocal resemblance to David Guetta's "Bad". Regarding the song's backstory, Hollowell-Dhar revealed that "Magic" was originally produced with Adrian Lux two years prior, with the duo failing to bring the track into the right direction then. Lux eventually gave up on the song, but Hollowell-Dhar continued working on the song until its final release.

=== 2019: No Regrets and Devil Inside Me ===
Hollowell-Dhar's first release of the year was a collaboration with Belgian producer Yves V and American band Krewella titled "No Regrets". Released through Dharma on March 1, 2019, the track's chord patterns and drop were favorably compared to Alan Walker's signature sounds and style. In the same month, Hollowell-Dhar released 'Devil Inside Me' with Swedish producer Kaaze and vocalist Kaara. The melody of the song samples some elements the Jewish ballad, "Shalom Aleichem".

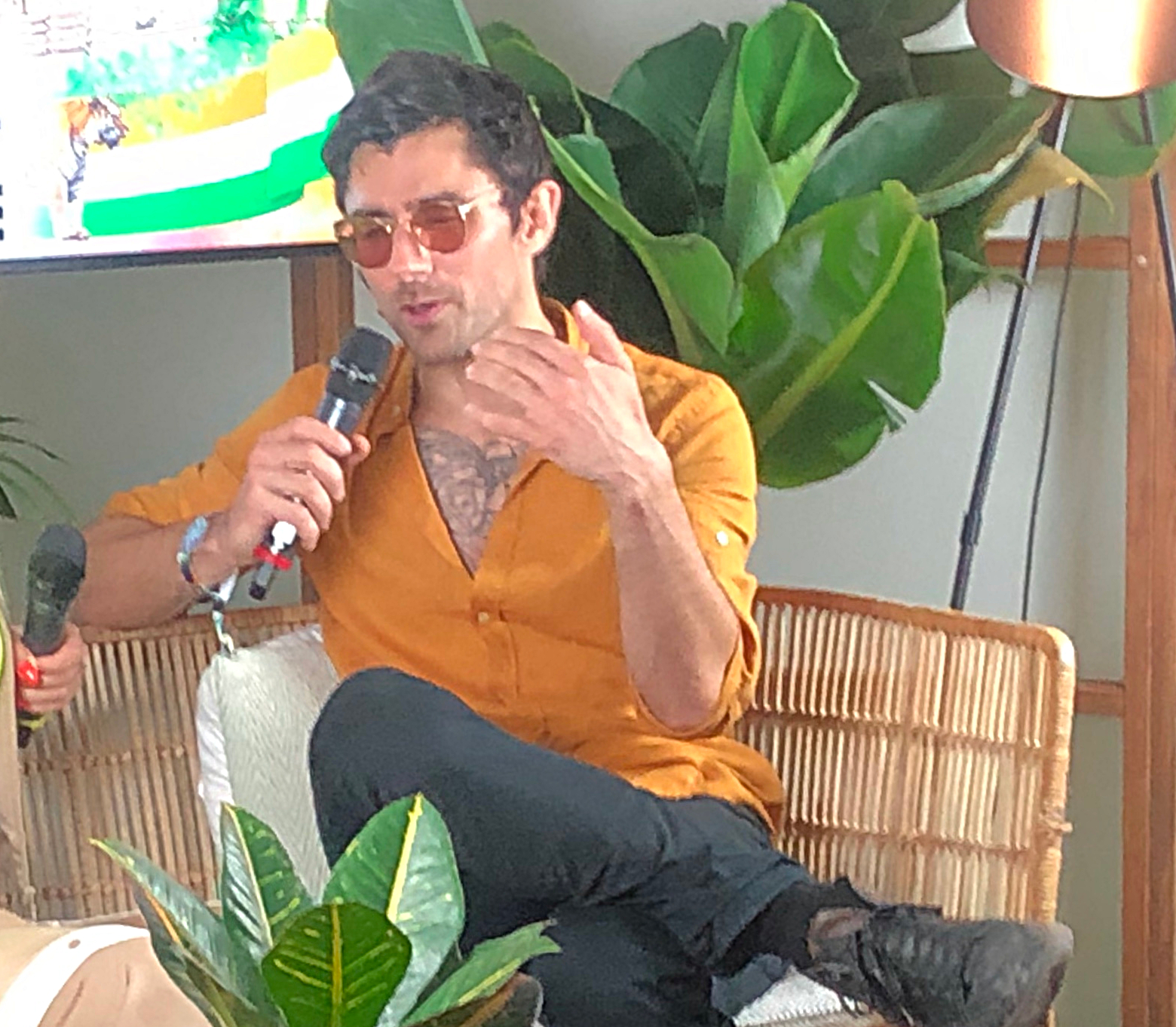
Hollowell-Dhar in an interview at Airbeat One 2019

On June 24, 2019, Hollowell-Dhar announced the release of a new educational Dharma Worldwide platform consisting of tutorials, templates, and samples. Following that, a big room collaboration with Australian producer Timmy Trumpet, titled "The People", was released on June 28, 2019. The next day, he released "Lies" with Dutch producer B3rror featuring the vocals of Luciana. Hollowell-Dhar then released "My Best Life" with Australian singer Mike Waters on July 12, 2019. Regarding the song, Niles said, "This song, made by me and Mike Waters, is about social media and how it has become a tool for measuring ourselves. We talked about how it can be freeing to submit to the fact that somebody will always have nicer things and from there the lyrics came together". The track sparked some controversy with Indian rapper Emiway Bantai's song "Machayenge" as they both sampled some portions from Hollowell-Dhar's sample pack Sounds of Kshmr Volume 3.

=== 2020-2022: "One More Round" and Harmonica Andromeda ===
On October 15, 2020, Hollowell-Dhar released the single "One More Round" featuring Jeremy Oceans. It was released on Spinnin' Records and is a collaboration with Singaporean game developer Garena for their video game Free Fire in celebration of the game's "Booyah Day" event which ran from October 16 to November 1. As a result of this collaboration, Free Fire introduced into their game a new character based on Hollowell-Dhar named K.

Hollowell-Dhar released two songs: "The World We Left Behind" featuring Karra and "Around the World" with producer Noumenn and uncredited vocals by Ivy on January 15 and February 26 respectively, as the first and second singles from his debut studio album Harmonica Andromeda. The rest of the album was released on March 19, featuring 11 songs and 3 interludes. On June 11, a deluxe version of the album was released with 5 new songs, amounting to 19 tracks in total.

On May 24, 2021, Hollowell-Dhar, along with Armaan Malik and Eric Nam, released their new joint single, "Echo," in celebration of Asian American Pacific Islander (AAPI) Heritage Month. Regarding the song, Hollowell-Dhar said, "Echo is a song about tough relationships that I think we can all relate to. It was a demo I started years ago, unsure of how to finish it until I met Armaan. The voice and story he brought to the song was the perfect fit. Eric lent his awesome talent and it became a cross-country Asian collaboration, which I love."

On August 5, 2021, Hollowell-Dhar released the psytrance-influenced big room house track "Winners Anthem" with Zafrir. Later that month on the 24th, he along with Alok and Dimitri Vegas & Like Mike released a slap house track for Garena Free Fire's 4th anniversary, titled "Reunion". He then released "Close Your Eyes" with Norwegian artist and music producer Martin Tungevaag on November 19.

On February 25, 2022, Hollowell-Dhar released the single "Lion Heart" in collaboration with Indian rapper Divine and Argentine freestyle rapper Lit Killah featuring Jeremy Oceans and frequent collaborator Karra.

=== 2023: Karam ===
In November 2023, Hollowell-Dhar released his second studio album, Karam (Note: Karam, translates to "action" or "deed" in Hindi, reflecting the central theme of choices and consequences.), marking a significant departure from his previous works, due to the incorporation of hip-hop elements in this project. The concept album, rooted in themes of ambition, greed, and retribution, tells the story of a young man who navigates a life of crime and ultimately, faces the consequences of his choices. The album features a diverse range of musical styles, blending KSHMR's signature electronic dance music with Indian hip-hop. Preceding the album's release, three lead singles were released. Over 20 artists from India collaborated on the project, including KR$NA, Raftaar, Ikka, Raja Kumari, Seedhe Maut, Yashraj, Hanumankind, Yungsta, Riar Saab, Lisa Mishra, Munawar Faruqui, Vedan, Dabzee and MC STΔN.

== Musical style ==
Hollowell-Dhar had several Beatport hits, such as "No Heroes", "Burn", "Dead Mans Hand", "Kashmir", "Dogs", "Karate", his remix of duo Nervo's song "It Feels", and "Jammu". His logo, artist name, and tracks like "Delhi", "Jammu", "Kashmir", "Bazaar", "Dharma" and his EP Paradesi are based on and/or inspired by his half Kashmiri ethnic descent:

I grew up being familiar with Indian music and movies because of my dad but I wasn't really interested in making music with Indian elements until later on in my life when appreciation for my heritage grew. That's when I started Kshmr as a tribute to my dad and my grandparents who are from [Kashmir].

In 2015, Hollowell-Dhar was ranked number 23 on DJ Mag's Top 100 DJs of the year poll, the highest new entry that year. His position in the Top 100 DJs of 2016 elevated by 11 from the previous year to be placed at 12th.

Hollowell-Dhar currently uses Ableton Live 10 as his DAW. While part of the Cataracs, he used Reason.

In 2023, Hollowell-Dhar expanded his musical style with the Indian hip-hop album Karam.

== Discography ==
- Harmonica Andromeda (2021)
- Karam (2023)
- Mirage (2026)

== Accolades ==
Year	Award	Nominated work	Category	Result
2015	DJ Mag	Himself	Top 100 DJs	23
2016	DJ Mag	Himself	Top 100 DJs	12
2017	DJ Mag	Himself	Top 100 DJs	12
2018	DJ Mag	Himself	Top 100 DJs	18
2019	DJ Mag	Himself	Top 100 DJs	15
2020	DJ Mag	Himself	Top 100 DJs	12
2021	DJ Mag	Himself	Top 100 DJs	11
2022	DJ Mag	Himself	Top 100 DJs	12
2023	DJ Mag	Himself	Top 100 DJs	15
2024	DJ Mag	Himself	Top 100 DJs	14
2025	DJ Mag	Himself	Top 100 DJs	23
