= I Prevail discography =

- Studio albums: 4
- EPs: 1
- Singles: 32
- Music videos: 30

The American rock band I Prevail has released four studio albums, one extended play (EP), thirty-two singles, and thirty music videos.

== Studio albums ==
Title	Details	Peak chart positions										Sales	Certifications
Title	Details	US	AUS	AUT	BEL (FL)	CAN	GER	NZ Heat.	SCO	SWI	UK	Sales	Certifications
Lifelines	Released: October 21, 2016; Label: Fearless; Formats: CD, digital download, streaming, LP	15	8	—	—	17	—	10	60	—	72		RIAA: Gold; MC: Gold
Trauma	Released: March 29, 2019; Label: Fearless; Formats: CD, digital download, streaming, LP	14	6	38	172	22	32	—	58	58	60	US: 181,000	BPI: Silver; MC: Gold
True Power	Released: August 19, 2022; Label: Fearless; Formats: CD, digital download, streaming, LP	48	5	42	—	68	28	—	84	50	96	US: 258,000	
Violent Nature	Released: September 19, 2025; Label: Fearless; Formats: CD, cassette, digital download, streaming, LP	161	17	37	183	—	57	—	—	—	— (Note: Violent Nature did not enter the UK Albums Chart, but peaked at number 19 on the UK Album Downloads Chart and number 81 on the UK Albums Sales Chart.)		

== Extended plays ==
Title	Details	Peak chart positions							
Title	Details	US	US Alt.	US Dig.	US Hard	US Heat.	US Indie	US Rock	US Sales
Heart vs. Mind	Released: December 17, 2014; Label: Fearless; Formats: CD, digital download, streaming, LP	88	6	17	4	10	5	9	39

== Singles ==
Year	Single	Peak chart positions							Certifications	Album
Year	Single	US	US Air.	US Alt.	US Main.	US Rock	US Hard Rock Digi.	US Hot Hard Rock	Certifications	Album
2014	"Blank Space" (Taylor Swift cover)	90	—	—	23	9	18	—	RIAA: Platinum; ARIA: Gold	Heart vs. Mind
2014	"Love, Lust, and Liars"	—	—	—	—	—	—	—		Heart vs. Mind
2014	"The Enemy"	—	—	—	—	—	—	—		Heart vs. Mind
2016	"Scars"	—	—	—	—	39	3	—	RIAA: Gold; ARIA: Gold; MC: Gold	Lifelines
2016	"Stuck in Your Head"	—	—	—	36	40	7	—	RIAA: Gold; ARIA: Gold; MC: Gold	Lifelines
2016	"Come and Get It"	—	—	—	—	—	25	—	ARIA: Gold	Lifelines
2016	"Alone"	—	21	—	6	25	8	—	RIAA: Gold	Lifelines
2017	"Lifelines"	—	37	—	11	—	—	—		Lifelines
2019	"Bow Down"	—	—	—	—	32	21	18	RIAA: Gold; ARIA: Gold	Trauma
2019	"Breaking Down"	—	19	—	3	24	22	—	RIAA: Gold	Trauma
2019	"Paranoid"	—	—	—	—	49	—	—		Trauma
2019	"Hurricane"	—	13	—	1	10	—	—		Trauma
2019	"Gasoline"	—	—	—	—	—	—	—	ARIA: Gold; MC: Gold	Trauma
2020	"Hurricane (Reimagined)"	—	—	—	—	—	—	—	ARIA: Gold	Post Traumatic
2020	"Feel Something" (with Illenium and Excision)	—	—	—	—	—	—	—		Post Traumatic
2020	"DOA" (featuring Joyner Lucas)	—	—	—	—	—	—	5		Post Traumatic
2020	"Every Time You Leave" (featuring Delaney Jane)	—	16	—	3	42	—	3		Trauma
2022	"Body Bag"	—	—	—	—	—	4	9		True Power
2022	"Bad Things"	—	10	32	1	37	9	5		True Power
2022	"Self-Destruction"	—	—	—	—	—	—	10		True Power
2022	"There's Fear In Letting Go"	—	—	—	—	—	—	16		True Power
2023	"Deep End"	—	11	—	4	34	18	10		True Power
2023	"Closure"	—	—	—	25	—	—	—		True Power
2024	"Can U See Me In the Dark?" (with Halestorm)	—	8	—	1	—	—	6		Non-album single
2024	"Hate This Song" (with All Time Low)	—	—	—	—	—	—	—		True Power (Expanded)
2025	"Violent Nature"	—	—	—	—	—	3	13		Violent Nature
2025	"Into Hell"	—	28	—	8	—	9	10		Violent Nature
2025	"Rain"	—	—	—	—	—	—	21		Violent Nature
2025	"Annihilate Me"	—	—	—	—	—	—	17		Violent Nature
2025	"Pray"	—	—	—	—	—	—	17		Violent Nature
2026	"Paradise" (featuring Amira Elfeky)	—	—	—	—	—	×	10		Non-album single
"—" denotes a recording that did not chart or was not released in that territory.

== Collaborations ==
Year	Title	Peak chart positions			Album	Artist
Year	Title	US Hard Rock Digi.	US Hot Hard Rock	US Main.	Album	Artist
2017	"Real Life Monsters" (featuring Eric Vanlerberghe)	—	—	—	Non-album single	Versus Me
2024	"House on Sand" (featuring Eric Vanlerberghe)	10	11	1	Carnal	Nothing More
2024	"Be Someone" (featuring Eric Vanlerberghe)	—	—	—	Heaven Can Wait	Trash Boat

== Music videos ==
Year	Song	Director	Ref.
2014	"Blank Space"	I Prevail	
2014	"Love, Lust, and Liars"	Sam Link	
2014	"The Enemy"	Sam Link	
2015	"Crossroads"	Alan Ledford	
2016	"Scars"	Max Moore	
2016	"Stuck in Your Head"	Drew Russ	
2017	"Come and Get It"	Kurt Mackey	
2017	"Lifelines"	Caleb Mallery	
2017	"Alone"	Chris Schoenman	
2017	"Already Dead"	Samuel Halleen	
2018	"RISE"	Ben Roberds	
2019	"Bow Down"	Ben Proulx	
2019	"Breaking Down"	Ben Proulx	
2019	"Paranoid"	Ben Proulx	
2019	"Hurricane"	Kurt Mackey	
2019	"Gasoline"	Ben Proulx	
2019	"Hurricane" (version 2)	Kurt Mackey	
2020	"DOA" (featuring Joyner Lucas)	Ben Proulx	
2020	"Every Time You Leave" (featuring Delaney Jane)	Ben Proulx	
2022	"Body Bag"	Tom Flynn	
2022	"Bad Things"	Third Eye Visuals	
2022	"Self-Destruction"	Jensen Noen	
2022	"There's Fear in Letting Go"	Jensen Noen	
2023	"Deep End"	Jensen Noen	
2025	"Violent Nature"	Orie McGinness	
2025	"Into Hell"	George Gallardo Kattah	
2025	"Rain"	Orie McGinness	
2025	"Pray"	Orie McGinness	
2026	"Paradise" (featuring Amira Elfeky)	Orie McGinness	
