= Feel Something (Illenium, Excision and I Prevail song) =

2020 single by Illenium, Excision and I Prevail

Single by Illenium, Excision and I Prevail
- Released: April 3, 2020
- Genre: Dubstep; dance-pop; metalcore; EDM
- Length: 3:41
- Label: Astralwerks
- Songwriters: Nicholas Miller; David Pramik; Brian Burkheiser; Jeffrey Abel; Richard Vanlergerghe; Stephen Menoian; Charlie Handsome
- Producers: Illenium; David Pramik; Excision

Illenium singles chronology
"Hard To Say Goodbye" (2019)	"Feel Something" (2020)	"Nightlight" (2020)

Excision singles chronology
"Another Me" (2019)	"Feel Something" (2020)	"Resistance" (2020)

I Prevail singles chronology
"Hurricane (Reimagined)" (2020)	"Feel Something" (2020)	"DOA" (2020)

"Feel Something" is a single by the American DJ Illenium, the Canadian producer Excision and the American rock band I Prevail. It was released on April 3, 2020, via Astralwerks.

== Background ==
In July 2019, Illenium and Excision were working on a then-untitled single in the studio, and then in September of the same year they debuted "Feel Something" during a back-to-back set at Lost Lands.

== Composition ==
EDM said that the song "incorporates both artists' soft and heavy sides".

== Lyric video ==
The lyric video was published on April 3, 2020, and featured Illenium as a phoenix and Excision as a dinosaur.

== Charts ==
=== Weekly charts ===
Weekly chart performance for "Feel Something"
Chart (2020)	Peak position
US Hot Dance/Electronic Songs (Billboard)	8

=== Year-end charts ===
Year-end chart performance for "Feel Something"
Chart (2020)	Position
US Hot Dance/Electronic Songs (Billboard)	78
