= Breaking Down =

2019 song by I Prevail

Single by I Prevail

from the album Trauma
- Released: February 26, 2019
- Recorded: 2018
- Length: 3:26
- Label: Fearless
- Songwriters: Brian Burkheiser; Eric Vanlerberghe; Steve Menoian; David Pramik; Tyler Smyth; Richard Vanlerberghe
- Producer: Tyler Smyth

I Prevail singles chronology
"Bow Down" (2019)	"Breaking Down" (2019)	"Paranoid" (2019)

"Breaking Down" is a song by the American rock band I Prevail, released as the second single from their second studio album Trauma. In July 2019, it peaked at number three on the Billboard Mainstream Rock Songs chart.

== Background ==
The song was first released on February 26, 2019, a month before the release of its respective album, Trauma. It was released within twelve hours of the first single released from the album, "Bow Down". A music video accompanied the release, which contained lead singer Brian Burkheiser covered in a black sludge, said to be "lyrical and visual representation of depression". It was later debuted in a live setting on March 11, 2019, at the Download Festival.

== Themes and composition ==
Thematically, the song's lyrics are self-referential to the band's recent struggles with their rising fame, depression, and mental health. After working hard to establish themselves as a band, and succeeding in gaining popularity with their cover of Taylor Swift's "Blank Space" and their first album, Lifelines, a doctor diagnosed Burkheiser with polyp on his vocal cords that required surgery. The experience caused him to suffer from depression and almost give up on the band. Burkheiser explained of the song:

It’s taken me a minute to post about 'Breaking Down' because it's still a subject that is very hard for me to touch on...the last couple years of my life have been such a blur and even though there has been plenty of success, my mind put me in a place where I just couldn’t enjoy anything. I cut off so many people because I was in such a dark place and couldn't find a way out...This song means so much to me, and I hope even though it doesn’t end on a positive note, those who deal with similar issues can know that they aren't alone in this...I was at the lowest point of my life last year, and even though I still have my days where things can seem unbearable, I know that this band is where I am meant to be. If you’re like me, just take things day by day. Take the good with the bad, and know that there is something out there waiting for you. Sometimes it can just take time to find out exactly what that is."

Burkheiser states that writing the song was therapeutic, and that it "given [him] a breath of life that [he] honestly never thought [he] would feel again."

== Personnel ==
- Brian Burkheiser – clean vocals
- Eric Vanlerberghe – unclean vocals
- Steve Menoian – lead guitar, bass
- Dylan Bowman – rhythm guitar
- Gabe Helguera – drums

== Charts ==
=== Weekly charts ===
Chart (2019)	Peak position
US Hot Rock & Alternative Songs (Billboard)	24
US Mainstream Rock (Billboard)	3

=== Year-end charts ===
Chart (2019)	Position
US Hot Rock Songs (Billboard)	51
