= Bad Things =

Bad Things may refer to:

- Bad Things (band), American synthrock band started by snowboarder Shaun White
- "Bad Things" (Jace Everett song), the theme to HBO's True Blood
- "Bad Things" (Machine Gun Kelly and Camila Cabello song), 2016
- "Bad Things" (I Prevail song), 2022
- "Bad Things," a song by Cults from their 2011 album Cults
- "Bad Things", a song by K.Flay from her 2014 album Life as a Dog
- "Bad Things", a song by Meiko from her 2014 studio album Dear You
- "Bad Things", a song by Milky Chance from their 2017 album Blossom
- "Bad Things", a song by Mini Mansions from their 2019 album Guy Walks into a Bar...
- "Bad Things", a song by Alison Wonderland from her 2022 album Loner
- Bad Things (film), a 2023 horror-thriller film by Stewart Thorndike
