= Hurricane (I Prevail song) =

2019 song by I Prevail

Single by I Prevail

from the album Trauma
- Released: April 2, 2019
- Length: 3:43
- Label: Fearless
- Songwriters: Brian Burkheiser; Tyler Smyth; Eric Vanlerberghe; Steve Menoian; Bernard Perry; John Pregler
- Producer: Smyth

I Prevail singles chronology
"Paranoid" (2019)	"Hurricane" (2019)	"Gasoline" (2019)

Hurricane (Reimagined) single artwork

Music video
- "Hurricane" on YouTube

"Hurricane" is a song by the American rock band I Prevail, released as the fourth single from their second studio album, Trauma. The song became the band's first number-one single on Billboard's Mainstream Rock Songs chart.

== Background and writing ==
Vocalist Brian Burkheiser said he began writing songs for Trauma after starting to recover from a vocal injury he sustained after touring in support of Lifelines. Burkheiser said the experience led him to write about trauma, which became the title of the album. He added that the song gave him an opportunity to use a softer vocal style following his recovery from a vocal injury. According to guitarist Steve Menoian, "Hurricane" was one of the first songs written for Trauma and the band's first collaboration with producer Tyler Smyth. Menoian said the band wrote the song while envisioning a performance at Wembley Stadium and aimed to make it sound "really big". Menoian added that the song's opening synthesizer pad was created with Smyth to make the introduction "enticing". The band described "Hurricane" as one of the most important songs on Trauma, and stated that it became "a pillar" in building the album's central message and sound. Vocalist Eric Vanlerberghe said the band viewed the track as a "middle ground" between the sound of Lifelines and the musical direction they wanted to pursue on Trauma. Vanlerberghe said the song retained elements of the band's earlier sound while indicating the musical direction the band would take in the future. He added that the song was a culmination of the band's experiences touring, including missing funerals, weddings, and other important moments with friends and family. He further added that the band began realizing what they had to give up as they achieved their dreams, describing this as a struggle. Guitarist Dylan Bowman said of "Hurricane", "I feel like we planted our feet in the ground with this sound." Bowman also said the song was balanced between the band's two vocalists, Burkheiser and Vanlerberghe.

== Composition ==
Wall of Sound described "Hurricane" as the most experimental track on Trauma, writing that it begins like a pop/electronic song before dramatically changing halfway through with a heavy-hitting rock chorus.

== Music video ==
A self-directed music video for "Hurricane" was released in April 2019. The video follows I Prevail's rise to fame through footage from life on the road and in the studio, while depicting several challenges the band faced, including losing all of their equipment in a bus fire, missing time with their families, and Burkheiser nearly losing his voice. It also features footage from the band's performances at Download Festival Australia, Burkheiser's first shows with the band in more than a year.

A live video for "Hurricane" was released in December 2019.

== Reimagined version ==
On March 13, 2020, I Prevail released an acoustic version of "Hurricane", titled "Hurricane (Reimagined)". According to the band, they had envisioned a stripped-down version of "Hurricane" since writing the song. The band said it would allow them to explore more delicate instrumentation, production, and vocals.

== Track listing ==
"Hurricane (Reimagined)" single
No.	Title	Length
1.	"Hurricane (Reimagined)" (explicit)	3:15
2.	"Hurricane" (explicit)	3:43
Total length:		6:58

== Chart performance ==
"Hurricane" reached number one on the Billboard Mainstream Rock Songs chart dated March 21, 2020, becoming I Prevail's first number-one single on the chart and the band's sixth entry overall. The song became the first by a new chart-topping act to reach number one on the chart in 2020.

== Personnel ==
Credits adapted from Apple Music.

I Prevail

- Brian Burkheiser – lead vocals
- Eric Vanlerberghe – lead vocals
- Steve Menoian – lead guitar
- Dylan Bowman – rhythm guitar
- Gabe Helguera – drums

Production and engineering

- Tyler Smyth – producer, mixing engineer, recording engineer
- Ted Jensen – mastering engineer

== Charts ==
=== Weekly charts ===
Weekly chart performance for "Hurricane"
Chart (2019–2020)	Peak position
US Hot Rock & Alternative Songs (Billboard)	10
US Rock & Alternative Airplay (Billboard)	13
US Mainstream Rock Airplay (Billboard)	1

=== Year-end charts ===
Year-end chart performance for "Hurricane"
Chart (2020)	Position
US Hot Rock & Alternative Songs (Billboard)	69
US Mainstream Rock Airplay (Billboard)	5

== Certifications ==
Certifications for "Hurricane (Reimagined)"
Region	Certification	Certified units/sales
Australia (ARIA)	Gold	35,000^{‡}
^{‡} Sales+streaming figures based on certification alone.
