= Heaven (Shaun Frank and Kshmr song) =

Single by Shaun Frank and Kshmr featuring Delaney Jane
- Released: 30 October 2015
- Genre: Future house
- Length: 5:33
- Label: Effective Records; Spinnin' Records
- Songwriter(s): Barry Lanoah Alexander

"Heaven" is a song by DJs Shaun Frank and Kshmr. It features Delaney Jane. Described as future house, the song was released through Spinnin' Records.

== Music video ==
The official music video, directed by Tyler Hynes and premiered by Billboard, was released. The song was remixed by Two Friends.

== Track listing ==
Single
No.	Title	Length
1.	"Heaven" (featuring Delaney Jane)	5:33

Remixes (EP)
No.	Title	Length
1.	"Heaven" (The Him Remix)	4:03
2.	"Heaven" (Addal Remix)	5:12
3.	"Heaven" (KSHMR Remix)	4:00
4.	"Heaven" (Dr. Fresch Remix)	3:14

== Charts ==
Chart (2015)	Peak position
Belgium (Ultratip Bubbling Under Flanders)	48
Belgium (Ultratip Bubbling Under Wallonia)	21
