= Bad Things (I Prevail song) =

2022 song by I Prevail

Single by I Prevail

from the album True Power
- Released: July 12, 2022
- Genre: Metalcore; nu metal; alternative rock
- Length: 3:48
- Label: Fearless
- Songwriters: Tyler Smyth; Brian Burkheiser; Eric Vanlerberghe; Steve Menoian; Jon Eberhard
- Producer: Smyth

I Prevail singles chronology
"Body Bag" (2022)	"Bad Things" (2022)	"Self-Destruction" (2022)

Music video
- "Bad Things" on YouTube

"Bad Things" is a song by the American rock band I Prevail, released as the second single from their third studio album, True Power. The song reached number one on the Billboard Mainstream Rock Airplay chart, giving I Prevail their second number-one on the chart.

== Background and composition ==
Vocalist Eric Vanlerberghe said that "Bad Things" was one of the first songs I Prevail started working on for True Power, with Brian Burkheiser humming melodies over the music bed. Vanlerberghe described the chorus as a "very down-the-middle I Prevail chorus" and said the band took things they had tried with Trauma and rapping into the verses. He also described the song's guitar riff as "simple but heavy". Vanlerberghe said he worked on the song while staying in Airbnbs with producer Tyler Smyth, Burkheiser, and guitarist Steve Menoian. He said the band was trying to create a "new vibe", noting that singing choruses and rapping verses had been done "so many times before", and that they did not want to emulate bands such as Linkin Park. Wall of Sound described the song as having an "almost nu-metalcore vibe", while Anthony Santoro wrote that it marked a return to the band's more melodic side. Burkheiser and Vanlerberghe use dual vocals throughout the verses, with Burkheiser providing clean vocals and Vanlerberghe delivering a spoken rap style. In the chorus, Vanlerberghe switches between yells and distant screams. Santoro described the verses as being driven by Menoian's bass line and Gabe Helguera's drums and noted that Menoian and Dylan Bowman "bounce back and forth" during the pre-breakdown section. He also described a "very groovy riffdown". AllMusic's Neil Z. Yeung wrote that I Prevail's clean and dirty vocals are merged with rapping on the track.

Rock Sound's Jack Rogers wrote that "Bad Things" leaned more toward the band's emotional side than its "unrelenting" side, while featuring melodies, hard-hitting bars, pop sensibilities, and a breakdown. Kerrang!'s Paul Travers wrote that the song leans closer to Linkin Park. Eli Enis of Revolver described the song as featuring "Weeknd-style pop-R&B singing" alongside "rubbery metal instrumentation" and called it an "insanely catchy" track. The Music described the track as an "anthemic rocker" and wrote that it tightened up the band's blend of metalcore, alternative rock, and nu metal.

== Reception ==
Melinda Welsh of Spill Magazine called "Bad Things" her personal favorite from True Power, describing it as "catchy" and saying that it "flows very smoothly". Welsh wrote that the lyrics "speak volumes", describing them as "almost loving the numbness" and saying that it "feels better than the pain".

== Track listing ==
All tracks are written by Tyler Smyth, Brian Burkheiser, Steve Menoian, Eric Vanlerberghe, and Jon Eberhard.

"Bad Things" single
No.	Title	Length
1.	"Bad Things"	3:48
2.	"Body Bag" (explicit)	3:16
Total length:		7:05

== Live performances ==
A live performance video of "Bad Things" from I Prevail's True Power tour was released on December 16, 2022.

== Chart performance ==
"Bad Things" reached number one on Active Rock Radio in the US in November 2022. The song also reached number one on the Billboard Mainstream Rock Airplay chart dated November 5, 2022, giving I Prevail their second number-one on the chart. It reached number 10 on the Rock & Alternative Airplay chart, giving the band their first top-10 entry on the chart.

== Personnel ==
Credits adapted from Apple Music.

I Prevail

- Brian Burkheiser – clean vocals
- Eric Vanlerberghe – unclean vocals
- Steve Menoian – lead guitar, bass guitar
- Dylan Bowman – rhythm guitar, backing vocals
- Gabe Helguera – drums

Production and engineering

- Tyler Smyth – producer, mixing engineer, recording engineer
- Ted Jensen – mastering engineer

== Charts ==
=== Weekly charts ===
Weekly chart performance for "Bad Things"
Chart (2022)	Peak position
US Hot Rock & Alternative Songs (Billboard)	37
US Rock & Alternative Airplay (Billboard)	10
US Mainstream Rock Airplay (Billboard)	1

=== Year-end charts ===
Year-end chart performance for "Bad Things"
Chart (2022)	Position
US Mainstream Rock Airplay (Billboard)	34
