= Easy Go (song) =

2016 single by Grandtheft and Delaney Jane

Single by Grandtheft and Delaney Jane
- Released: November 4, 2016
- Recorded: 2016
- Genre: Future bass
- Length: 3:10
- Label: Mad Decent
- Songwriter(s): Aaron Waisglass
- Producer(s): Grandtheft

Grandtheft singles chronology
"Hold On" (2015)	"Easy Go" (2016)

Delaney Jane singles chronology
"Another Life" (2016)	"Easy Go" (2016)	"Howl" (2017)

"Easy Go" is a song recorded by Canadian DJ Grandtheft and singer Delaney Jane. The song debuted at number 46 on Billboard's Hot Dance/Electronic Songs chart in the United States and later peaked at number 27.

== Music video ==
The video stars Jane who was immediately enamored with her Uber driver. She begins to have intense fantasies of the two of them. Most of the video takes place in the back of a car. Jane arrives at her destination before Grandtheft enters the car of a female driver. It was presumed the scene would go on in a cycle.

== Composition ==
The song begins with some light percussion and a bassline. Delaney Jane then takes the lead with her gentle crooning. The drums plays as a soaring chord progression arises, before rolling snares and rising synths progresses into the drops. It is a future bass workout, utilizing the singer’s a cappella to create a winding melody over 'splashy chord flourishes' and trap rhythms.

== Track listing ==
=== Single ===
- "Easy Go" – 3:10

=== Remixes ===
- "Easy Go" (Hunter Siegel Remix)

== Charts ==
Chart (2016)	Peak position
Canada CHR/Top 40 (Billboard)	19
Canada Hot AC (Billboard)	49
US Dance/Mix Show Airplay (Billboard)	15
US Hot Dance/Electronic Songs (Billboard)	26

== Certifications and sales ==
Region	Certification	Certified units/sales
Canada (Music Canada)	Gold	40,000^{‡}
^{‡} Sales+streaming figures based on certification alone.
