= Violent Nature =

Studio album by I Prevail
- Released: September 19, 2025
- Genre: Metalcore; heavy metal; post-hardcore
- Length: 32:08
- Label: Fearless
- Producer: Jon Eberhard

I Prevail chronology
True Power (2022)	Violent Nature (2025)

Singles from Violent Nature
- 1. "Violent Nature" Released: May 23, 2025; 2. "Into Hell" Released: June 20, 2025; 3. "Rain" Released: July 18, 2025; 4. "Annihilate Me" Released: August 15, 2025; 5. "Pray" Released: September 19, 2025

Professional ratings
Review scores
Source	Rating
AllMusic	3.5/5 stars
Boolin Tunes	4/10
Kerrang!	4/5
Metal Hammer	3.5/5 stars
Wall of Sound	6/10

Violent Nature is the fourth studio album by the American rock band I Prevail, released on September 19, 2025, through Fearless Records. It was the band's first album released following the departure of former clean vocalist Brian Burkheiser and the first to feature bassist Jon Eberhard, who also produced the album.

== Release ==
On May 23, 2025, a week after the announcement of Burkheiser's departure, the band released the single, "Violent Nature". On June 20, a second single, "Into Hell", was released. On July 15, the band announced their fourth studio album, titled Violent Nature, would release on September 19, and in the same week released a third single, "Rain". On August 15, the album's fourth single, "Annihilate Me", was released.

== Composition ==
Violent Nature has been described as metalcore with elements of deathcore, pop rock, melodic metalcore, grunge, nu metal, and hard rock.

== Track listing ==
All tracks are written by I Prevail (Dylan Bowman, Jon Eberhard, Gabe Helguera, Steve Menoian, Eric Vanlerberghe).

No.	Title	Length
1.	"Synthetic Soul"	4:30
2.	"NWO"	2:41
3.	"Pray"	3:12
4.	"Annihilate Me"	3:22
5.	"Violent Nature"	2:10
6.	"Rain"	3:23
7.	"Into Hell"	3:12
8.	"Crimson & Clover"	3:47
9.	"God"	2:38
10.	"Stay Away"	3:11
Total length:		32:08

== Personnel ==
Credits are adapted from Tidal.

I Prevail

- Eric Vanlerberghe – lead vocals, composer
- Steve Menoian – lead guitar, composer
- Dylan Bowman – rhythm guitar, backing vocals, composer
- Jon Eberhard – bass, keyboards, composer, recording engineer, production
- Gabe Helguera – drums, composer

Production

- Zakk Cervini – mixing engineer
- Julian Gargiulo – mixing
- Ted Jensen – mastering
- Lucas Alexiades – additional mixing
- Jordan Kulp – additional mixing
- Nick Matzkows – additional engineering

== Charts ==
Chart performance for Violent Nature
Chart (2025)	Peak position
Australian Albums (ARIA)	17
Austrian Albums (Ö3 Austria)	37
Belgian Albums (Ultratop Flanders)	183
German Albums (Offizielle Top 100)	57
UK Album Downloads (OCC)	19
UK Album Sales (OCC)	81
US Billboard 200	161
