= Delaney Jane =

Canadian singer-songwriter

- Born: April 17, 1994 (age 32); Toronto, Ontario, Canada
- Occupation: Singer
- Years active: 2014–present
- Musical career
- Genres: Alt pop; EDM
- Instrument: Vocals
- Website: Delaney Jane - By Witly

Delaney Jane (born April 17, 1994) is a Canadian singer and songwriter. She rose to prominence as a guest vocalist on numerous popular dance tracks including the Juno-nominated "Limitless" before starting her own independent label imprint Dirty Pretty Things. Her official debut solo single, "Bad Habits", was released in 2018 to commercial success. Jane released her debut 13-song studio album, Dirty Pretty Things, in 2019.

== Career ==
Jane studied performing arts in Toronto, Ontario and met friend and fellow musician Shaun Frank. After touring with Frank, Jane performed the vocals on his 2014 single, "This Could Be Love". She would later collaborate with Frank on other dance tracks including "Shades of Grey" - her first single to chart in the United States on the Dance/Mix Show Airplay chart - and "La La Land" - her first single to enter the Canadian Hot 100 and be certified Gold by Music Canada. Her Adventure Club collaboration, "Limitless", was nominated for Dance Recording of the Year at the 2017 Juno Awards, but ultimately lost to Off the Ground by Bit Funk.

While working on music for her formal debut as a solo artist, Jane collaborated with Canadian DJ Grandtheft on "Easy Go", which impacted multiple charts in Canada and the United States. She released two independent singles - "Howl" and "Hotel Room" - in 2017 and 2018, respectively, but her second single of 2018, "Bad Habits", has been described as her first solo single. The latter song became her highest-charting single to date on the Canadian Hot 100, first top-ten on a Canadian airplay chart, and first single to be certified Platinum by Music Canada. After a series of other singles, Jane released her debut 13-song studio album, Dirty Pretty Things, on November 22, 2019.

Jane released an extended play titled Somewhere Else on December 10, 2020. The collection's fifth single, "Just as Much", was released in 2021 and attained Jane's highest chart positions since "Bad Habits". Also in 2020, Jane was a featured vocalist on the track "Every Time You Leave" from American rock band I Prevail's second studio album, Trauma (2020), which was subsequently released as the album's fifth single and earned Jane her first entry on the Billboard rock charts.

== Discography ==
=== Studio albums ===
List of studio albums, with selected details
Title	Album details
Dirty Pretty Things	Released: November 22, 2019; Label: Dirty Pretty Things; Format: CD, digital download

=== Extended plays ===
List of extended plays, with selected details
Title	Album details
Somewhere Else	Released: December 11, 2020; Label: Dirty Pretty Things; Format: Digital download
If Aliens Exist (Maybe Good Guys Do Too)	Released: November 4, 2022; Label: Dirty Pretty Things; Format: Digital download

=== Singles ===
==== As lead artist ====
List of singles as lead artist, with selected chart positions, showing year released and album name
Title	Year	Peak chart positions						Certifications	Album
Title	Year	CAN	CAN AC	CAN CHR	CAN HAC	US Dance	US Dance Air.	Certifications	Album
"Easy Go" (with Grandtheft)	2016	—	—	19	49	26	15	MC: Gold	Non-album singles
"Howl"	2017	—	—	—	—	—	—		Non-album singles
"Hotel Room"	2018	—	—	—	—	—	—		Non-album singles
"Bad Habits"	2018	57	13	15	10	—	—	MC: Platinum	Dirty Pretty Things
"L.U.I"	2018	—	—	—	—	—	—		Dirty Pretty Things
"Psycho"	2018	—	—	—	—	—	—		Dirty Pretty Things
"Throwback" (with Shaun Frank)	2019	—	—	—	—	—	—		Dirty Pretty Things
"You're So Last Summer" (Note: Cover version of a Taking Back Sunday song from their 2003 album, Tell All Your Friends.)	2019	—	—	—	—	—	—		Non-album single
"Red"	2019	—	—	—	—	—	—		Dirty Pretty Things
"Hello My Loneliness" (featuring Call Me Karizma)	2019	—	—	—	—	—	—		Dirty Pretty Things
"Safe with You"	2019	—	—	32	47	—	—		Dirty Pretty Things
"Somewhere Else"	2020	—	—	—	—	—	—		Somewhere Else
"Want You Now"	2020	—	—	—	—	—	—		Somewhere Else
"Just Sex"	2020	—	—	—	—	—	—		Somewhere Else
"On Paper"	2020	—	—	—	—	—	—		Somewhere Else
"Just as Much" (featuring Virginia to Vegas)	2021	71	15	11	21	—	—	MC: Gold	Somewhere Else
"We Don't Sleep"	2021	—	—	—	—	—	—		If Aliens Exist (Maybe Good Guys Do Too)
"Lovesick Lullaby"	2021	—	—	—	—	—	—		If Aliens Exist (Maybe Good Guys Do Too)
"Matinee"	2022	—	—	—	—	—	—		If Aliens Exist (Maybe Good Guys Do Too)
"—" denotes a recording that did not chart or was not released to that territory.

==== As featured artist ====
List of singles as featured artist, with selected chart positions, showing year released and album name
Title	Year	Peak chart positions										Certifications	Album
Title	Year	CAN	CAN CHR	BEL (Fl.)	BEL (Wal.)	FIN	FRA	NLD	SWE	US Dance	US Rock	Certifications	Album
"In My Hands" (Lush & Simon featuring Delaney Jane)	2014	—	—	—	—	—	—	—	—	—	—		Non-album singles
"This Could Be Love" (Borgeous and Shaun Frank featuring Delaney Jane)	2014	—	—	— (Note: "This Could Be Love" did not enter the Flemish Ultratop 50, but peaked at 64 on the Ultratip extension chart.)	—	—	—	—	—	—	—		Non-album singles
"Playing with Fire" (Estiva and Skouners featuring Delaney Jane)	2015	—	—	—	—	—	—	—	—	—	—		Non-album singles
"Air" (Dzeko & Torres featuring Delaney Jane)	2015	—	—	—	—	—	—	—	—	—	—		Non-album singles
"Still Waiting" (Hunter Siegel featuring Delaney Jane)	2015	—	—	—	—	—	—	—	—	—	—		Non-album singles
"The Other Side" (Nique, Mark & Prince featuring Delaney Jane)	2015	—	—	—	—	—	—	—	—	—	—		Non-album singles
"Ready for the World" (Dave Till and Henry Johnson featuring Delaney Jane)	2015	—	—	—	—	—	—	—	—	—	—		Non-album singles
"Time is on Your Side" (StadiumX and Dzasko featuring Delaney Jane)	2015	—	—	—	—	—	—	—	—	—	—		Non-album singles
"Shades of Grey" (Oliver Heldens and Shaun Frank featuring Delaney Jane)	2015	—	—	— (Note: "Shades of Grey" did not enter the Flemish Ultratop 50, but peaked at 10 on the Ultratip extension chart.)	—	—	—	65	—	— (Note: "Shades of Grey" did not enter the Billboard Hot Dance/Electronic Songs chart, but did peak at number 23 on the Dance/Mix Show Airplay chart.)	—		Non-album singles
"L'amour toujours" (Tiësto edit) (Dzeko & Torres featuring Delaney Jane)	2015	—	—	37	24	17	49	92	74	39	—		Non-album singles
"Heaven" (KSHMR and Shaun Frank featuring Delaney Jane)	2015	—	—	— (Note: "Heaven" did not enter the Flemish Ultratop 50, but peaked at 48 on the Ultratip extension chart.)	— (Note: "Heaven" did not enter the Walloon Ultratop 50, but peaked at 21 on the Ultratip extension chart.)	—	—	—	—	—	—		Non-album singles
"Limitless" (Adventure Club featuring Delaney Jane)	2016	—	—	—	—	—	—	—	—	—	—		Red // Blue
"Reckless" (Burak Yeter featuring Delaney Jane)	2016	—	—	—	—	—	—	—	—	—	—		Non-album singles
"La La Land" (DVBBS and Shaun Frank featuring Delaney Jane)	2016	93	27	—	—	—	157	41	—	24	—	MC: Gold	Non-album singles
"Another Life" (StadiumX, BAHA, and Markquis featuring Delaney Jane)	2016	—	—	—	—	—	—	—	—	—	—		Non-album singles
"Beautiful Life" (Disco Killerz featuring Delaney Jane)	2018	—	—	—	—	—	—	—	—	—	—		Non-album singles
"Rescue" (Zeds Dead and Dion Timmer featuring Delaney Jane)	2019	—	—	—	—	—	—	—	—	—	—		Non-album singles
"Smile" (Copacabana featuring Delaney Jane)	2020	—	—	—	—	—	—	—	—	—	—		Non-album singles
"Every Time You Leave" (I Prevail featuring Delaney Jane)	2020	—	—	—	—	—	—	—	—	—	42		Trauma
"With or Without Me" (Lucky Luke featuring Delaney Jane and Angelino)	2021	—	—	—	—	—	—	—	—	—	—		Non-album singles
"How Do I Say Goodbye" (Adventure Club featuring Delaney Jane)	2023	—	36	—	—	—	—	—	—	—	—		Non-album singles
"—" denotes a recording that did not chart or was not released to that territory.

=== Other appearances ===
List of non-single guest appearances, with other performing artists, showing year released and album name
Title	Year	Other artist(s)	Album
"You Don't Know Me"	2018	Sigala, Flo Rida and Shaun Frank	Brighter Days

=== Music videos ===
List of music videos, showing year released and directors
Title	Year	Director(s)	Ref.
As lead artist
"Easy Go" (with Grandtheft)	2017	Tyler Hynes	
"Howl"	2017	Tyler Hynes	
"Hotel Room"	2018	Clay Peter	
"Psycho" (Warning Prelude)	2019	Not Listed	
"Throwback" (with Shaun Frank)	2019	Tyler Hynes	
"You're So Last Summer"	2019	Not Listed	
"Red" (Note: Title stylized in all capital letters for the music video.)	2019	Mikhail Mehra	
"Hello My Loneliness" (with Call Me Karizma)	2019	Bobby Hanford	
"L.U.I"	2020	Not Listed	
"On Paper"	2020	Not Listed	
As featured artist
"Shades of Grey" (with Oliver Heldens and Shaun Frank)	2015	Tyler Hynes	
"Reckless" (with Burak Yeter)	2015	Burak Yeter	

== Awards and nominations ==
=== Juno Awards ===
Year	Nominee / work	Award	Result	Ref.
2017	"Limitless" (with Adventure Club)	Dance Recording of the Year	Nominated	

=== iHeartRadio Much Music Video Awards ===
Year	Nominee / work	Award	Result	Ref.
2017	"Easy Go" (with Grandtheft)	Best EDM/Dance Video	Nominated	
