= Rescue (Zeds Dead and Dion Timmer song) =

Single by Zeds Dead and Dion Timmer featuring Delaney Jane
- Released: May 15, 2019
- Genre: Dubstep
- Length: 3:01
- Label: Deadbeats
- Songwriter: Delaney Jane
- Producers: Dylan Mamid; Zachary Rapp-Rovan; Dion Timmer

Zeds Dead singles chronology
"Lift You Up" (2019)	"Rescue" (2019)

Dion Timmer singles chronology
"Neon Phantom" (2019)	"Rescue" (2019)

"Rescue" is a song by Canadian electronic music duo Zeds Dead and Dutch electronic music producer Dion Timmer, featuring singer-songwriter Delaney Jane. Canadian record label Deadbeats released it on May 15, 2019.

== Background and release ==
On May 15, 2019, the song was released as a digital download on international digital stores through Zeds Dead-owned record label Deadbeats, as well as being released through various music streaming services. The song was released as part of a forthcoming project to be released by Zeds Dead, in which the duo collaborates with various other musicians. The project is going to be released to "embody the sense of community its Deadbeats label represents".

== Critical reception ==
"Rescue" was well received by most critics. Kat Bein of Billboard praised Jane's vocals, writing that they added the "perfect amount of not-so-distressed damsel to its skater-kid cuteness", and described the song as being laced with "authentic swirls of pop punk and metal." Dancing Astronaut's Jessica Mao stated that the song "embodies the complements of old and new talent lending a hand to each other", later finishing his review of the song by writing that "Zeds Dead and Timmer have given the all-familiar dubstep anthem a refreshing makeover in their collaborative efforts on "Rescue."" Writing for EDM.com, John Cameron wrote that the song was once that "exhibits a seamless blend of both of their signature sounds" and praised the song's mix with its vocals, stating that the "catchy melodies intermingle with Jane's vocal in such a way that the song has plenty of utility on festival main stages and radio airwaves alike." Matthew Meadow of Your EDM called the song reminiscent of Zeds Dead's 2014 debut album Somewhere Else and a mix between the duos previous songs "Lights Out" and "Stardust", later commenting on the song's mix of the respective artists style, writing that "Delaney brings her own vibe to the release with her instantly recognisable voice, and Dion Timmer adds a little weight to the drops, but this sounds like a classic Zeds Dead tune as much as it can be."

== Track listing ==
Digital download – Single
No.	Title	Length
1.	"Rescue"	3:01
Total length:		3:01

== Release history ==
Region	Date	Format	Version	Label	Ref.
Worldwide	May 15, 2019	Digital download	"Rescue" (feat. Delaney Jane)	Deadbeats	
