= Heart vs. Mind =

EP by I Prevail
- Released: December 17, 2014
- Recorded: 2014
- Length: 29:26
- Label: Fearless

I Prevail chronology
Heart vs. Mind (2014)	Lifelines (2016)

Heart vs. Mind is the debut extended play by the American rock band I Prevail. It was released on December 17, 2014. Music videos were made for the songs "Blank Space" (Taylor Swift cover), "Love, Lust, and Liars", "The Enemy", and "Crossroads".

== Reception ==
The album entered the Billboard 200 at No. 88, the Rock Albums chart at No. 9, and the Hard Rock Albums at No. 4 for the chart dated January 24, 2015. It has sold 62,000 copies in the United States as of September 2016.

== Track listing ==
No.	Title	Length
1.	"Heart vs. Mind"	3:56
2.	"Crossroads"	3:29
3.	"Love, Lust, and Liars"	3:22
4.	"Face Your Demons"	3:11
5.	"The Enemy"	3:27
6.	"My Heart I Surrender"	3:27
7.	"Deceivers"	4:33

Bonus track
No.	Title	Length
8.	"Blank Space (Taylor Swift cover)"	4:00

Note

- "Blank Space" is not available on the iTunes version of the EP, instead it was released as a stand-alone track and was later featured on Punk Goes Pop Vol. 6.

== Personnel ==
=== I Prevail ===
- Brian Burkheiser – clean vocals
- Eric Vanlerberghe – unclean vocals
- Steve Menoian – lead guitar, bass
- Jordan Berger – rhythm guitar, backing vocals
- Lee Runestad – drums

== Charts ==
Chart (2015)	Peak position
U.S. Billboard 200	88
U.S. Billboard Alternative Albums	6
U.S. Billboard Independent Albums	5
US Top Hard Rock Albums (Billboard)	4
U.S. Billboard Top Rock Albums	9
