= True Power =

Studio album by I Prevail
- Released: August 19, 2022
- Genres: Metalcore; nu metal
- Length: 44:27
- Label: Fearless
- Producer: Tyler Smyth

I Prevail chronology
| Trauma (2019) | True Power (2022) | Violent Nature (2025) |

Singles from True Power
- 1. "Body Bag" Released: June 17, 2022; 2. "Bad Things" Released: July 12, 2022; 3. "Self-Destruction" Released: August 19, 2022; 4. "There's Fear in Letting Go" Released: November 22, 2022; 5. "Deep End" Released: March 16, 2023; 6. "Closure" Released: November 4, 2023

True Power is the third studio album by the American rock band I Prevail, released on August 19, 2022. The album was preceded by the singles "Body Bag" and "Bad Things". "Self-Destruction", "There's Fear in Letting Go", "Deep End" and "Closure" also later became singles. It was the final studio album to feature founding member and clean vocalist Brian Burkheiser before his departure from the band on May 15, 2025.

== Background and recording ==
The album was produced by Tyler Smyth, who also produced the band's previous album, Trauma. In an interview with Wall of Sound, guitarist Steve Menoian discussed the process of making the album:

"[We] were...drawn to way more of, just like rock and roll vibes on this record and I think part of that was like bucking expectation, but it’s also part of just what we were drawn to at the time. So I feel like we wanted to always have this record...[keep] you guessing and not feeling like you could ever really predict what’s coming in a lot of spots. And I feel that just was kind of the natural songwriting evolution that we were drawn to [on] this record and yeah, I think it’s a cool blend of styles for what we were able to create."

== Composition ==
True Power has been described as metalcore and nu metal, with elements of pop, trap, electronic, and grunge. Vocalists Brian Burkheiser and Eric Vanlerberghe both incorporate rap vocals on the album.

== Release ==
On June 17, 2022, the band released the lead single "Body Bag". On July 12, 2022, the band released the second single "Bad Things". On August 19, 2022, the band released a music video for the song "Self-Destruction". The album was released on August 19, 2022. On November 22, 2022, the band released a music video for the song "There’s Fear In Letting Go". On March 16, 2023, the band released a music video for the song "Deep End".

== Critical reception ==
Professional ratings
Review scores
| Source | Rating |
|---|---|
| AllMusic | 4/5 stars |
| Distorted Sound Mag | 9/10 |
| Hysteria Mag | 9/10 |
| Kerrang! | 4/5 |
| The Spill Magazine | 4/5 stars |
| Sputnikmusic | 2/5 |
| Upset | 4/5 stars |
| Wall of Sound | 8.5/10 |

True Power has received generally positive reviews from music critics. Paul Travers of Kerrang! complimented the album's dynamics and production stating, "I Prevail have expanded on the lighter moments from Trauma. But there’s always an explosion waiting to drop, and producing those jaw-dropping moments is one of the things they do so well." Chanel Issa of Hysteria Mag felt that "[the album] breathed new life into I Prevail’s sound, placing them in high contention for the coveted title of kings of the metalcore sandpit.

Melinda Welsh of The Spill Magazine praised unclean vocalist Eric Vanlerberghe for "[stepping out of his comfort zone...to deliver some softer-spoken rap style lyrics and clean vocals..." and called True Power "their most aggressive album yet." In a less positive review of the album, Tyler White of Sputnikmusic felt that its "lack of originality and ingenuity" left it "bland and stagnant and lacking character". Wall of Sound stated "I Prevail take everything they did on Trauma and dial it up to 11." On November 2, 2022, their single 'Bad Things' have peaked number 1 on the Billboard Active Rock Radio Charts, the first time since 2020 with their hit single, Hurricane.

== Track listing ==
All songs written by Brian Burkheiser, Steve Menoian, Eric Vanlerberghe, Tyler Smyth and Jon Eberhard except where noted.

| No. | Title | Writer(s) | Length |
|---|---|---|---|
| 1. | "0:00" | Burkheiser; Menoian; Vanlerberghe; Smyth | 0:41 |
| 2. | "There’s Fear in Letting Go" | Burkheiser; Menoian; Vanlerberghe; Smyth | 3:54 |
| 3. | "Body Bag" | | 3:16 |
| 4. | "Self-Destruction" | | 2:26 |
| 5. | "Bad Things" | | 3:48 |
| 6. | "Fake" | | 2:51 |
| 7. | "Judgement Day" | | 2:46 |
| 8. | "FWYTYK" | | 3:17 |
| 9. | "Deep End" | | 3:26 |
| 10. | "Long Live the King" | | 3:00 |
| 11. | "Choke" | | 3:02 |
| 12. | "The Negative" | | 2:20 |
| 13. | "Closure" | Burkheiser; Menoian; Vanlerberghe; Smyth; Eberhard; Erik Ron | 3:09 |
| 14. | "Visceral" | | 2:44 |
| 15. | "Doomed" | Burkheiser; Menoian; Vanlerberghe; Smyth | 3:47 |
| Total length: | | | 44:27 |

Expanded Edition
| No. | Title | Length |
|---|---|---|
| 16. | "Bad Things (Stripped)" | 3:41 |
| 17. | "There’s Fear in Letting Go (Stripped)" | 3:02 |
| 18. | "Deep End (Stripped)" | 3:30 |
| 19. | "Hate This Song (feat. All Time Low)" | 2:56 |
| Total length: | | 57:44 |

== Personnel ==
Credits retrieved from album's liner notes.

I Prevail

- Brian Burkheiser – clean vocals, composer
- Steve Menoian – lead guitar, bass, composer
- Eric Vanlerberghe – unclean vocals, additional clean vocals, composer
- Dylan Bowman – rhythm guitar, backing vocals
- Gabe Helguera – drums

Additional Musicians

- Bonnie McIntosh – piano on "Doomed"

Production

- Tyler Smyth – production, engineering, mixing
- Jon Eberhard – additional production
- Joey Doherty – additional production contributions
- Ted Jensen – mastering

Design

- 23in – art direction, cover design
- John Van Unen – digital illustration
- Strange Practice – design

== Charts ==
Chart performance for True Power
| Chart (2022) | Peak position |
|---|---|
| Australian Albums (ARIA) | 5 |
| Austrian Albums (Ö3 Austria) | 42 |
| Canadian Albums (Billboard) | 68 |
| German Albums (Offizielle Top 100) | 28 |
| Scottish Albums (Official Charts) | 84 |
| Swiss Albums (Schweizer Hitparade) | 50 |
| UK Albums (Official Charts) | 96 |
| UK Rock & Metal Albums (Official Charts) | 3 |
| US Billboard 200 | 48 |

=== Singles ===
| Title | Peak chart positions |
| Title | US Main. |
|---|---|
| "Bad Things" | 1 |
| "Deep End" | 4 |
| "Closure" | 25 |
