= Amira Elfeky =

American singer-songwriter

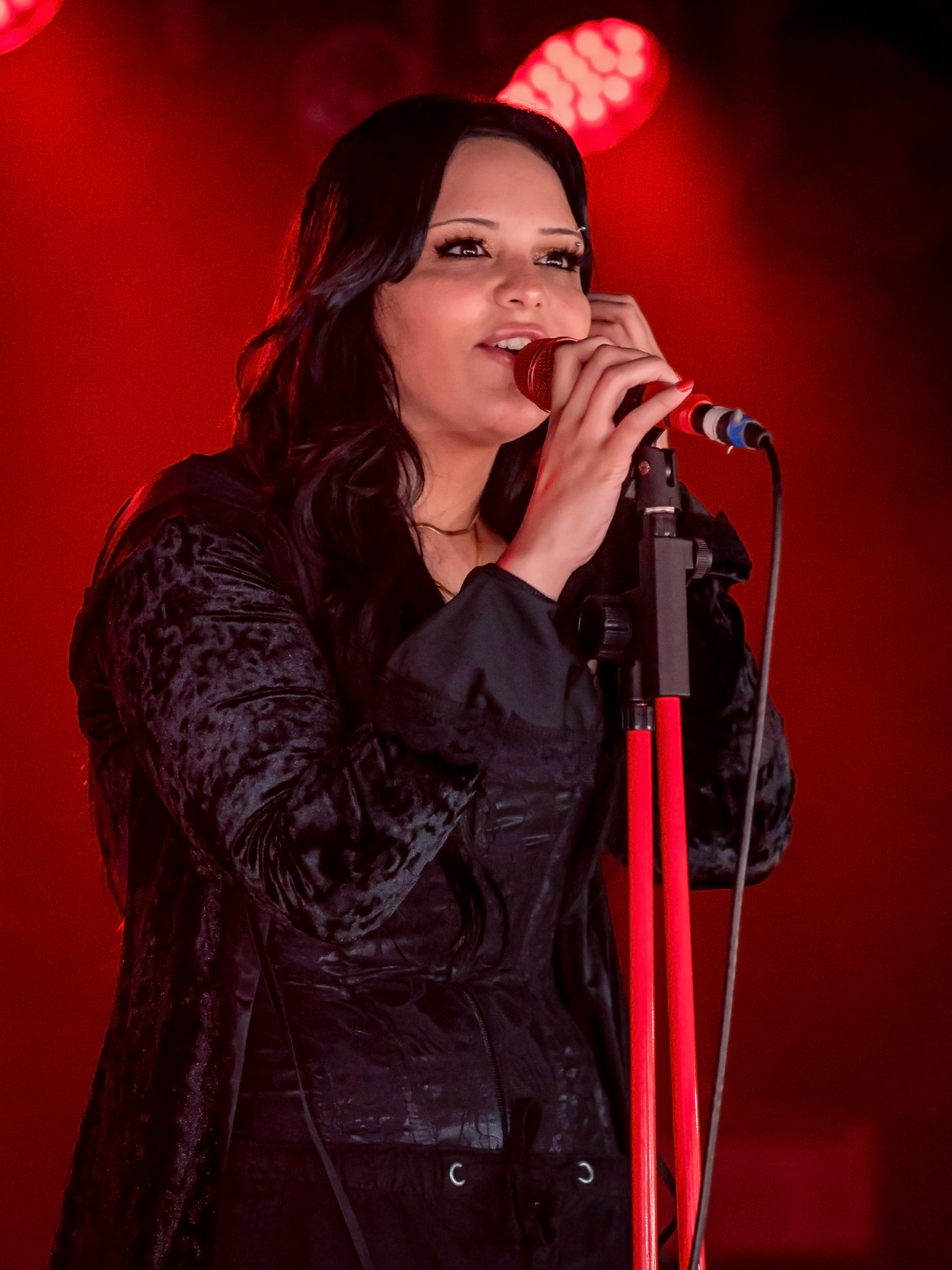
- Elfeky in 2024

Background information
- Origin: United States
- Genres: Nu metal; gothic rock; alternative metal; nu gaze
- Years active: 2023–present
- Label: Atlantic (Anemoia Records)
- Website: www.amiraelfeky.com

Amira Lynne Elfeky is an American singer and songwriter. Her debut studio album, It Was Only a Dream, was released on November 13, 2026.

== Early life ==
Elfeky was born and raised in Simsbury, Connecticut to an Egyptian father and an American mother. She attended Simsbury High School. When she was 18, Elfeky moved to San Francisco with her family. She currently resides in Los Angeles.

Elfeky's father used to play her Arabic songs from an early age, while her mother played her classic rock records. She was introduced to nu-metal by her two older brothers.

== Career ==
In March 2024, Elfeky released her first EP, Skin to Skin. In February 2025, it was announced that Elfeky was featured on "Judgement Day", a track from the Architects' album The Sky, the Earth & All Between. In 2024 she began working with music producer Zakk Cervini, who has worked with others in the genre, and he was in charge of producing and mixing her new material. Her second EP, Surrender, was released on March 29, 2025. Elfeky is a nominee for the 2025 Heavy Music Awards in the category of Best International Breakthrough Artist.

On September 30, 2026, Elfeky released the single "Breakdown". The following week on October 7, she announced that her debut studio album, It Was Only a Dream, would release November 13, 2026.

== Musical style ==
Elfeky's style has been described as a mix of several genres, including goth metal, nu-metal, nu-gaze, and alternative metal. She has cited Evanescence, Linkin Park, Deftones, System of a Down, Lana Del Rey, and Lady Gaga as influences.

== Touring ==
Elfeky opened for Bring Me The Horizon's US tour in September 2025. She is set to support I Prevail's Violent Nature Tour in September 2026 alongside Polaris.

== Discography ==
=== Studio albums ===
List of studio albums, with selected details
Title	Album details
It Was Only a Dream	Released: November 13, 2026; Label: Atlantic, Anemoia

=== Extended plays ===
List of extended plays
Title	EP details
Skin to Skin	Released: March 29, 2024; Label: Atlantic
Surrender	Released: March 28, 2025; Label: Atlantic

=== As lead artist ===
List of singles as lead artist
Title	Year	Album
"Tonight (demo)"	2023	Skin to Skin EP
"Coming Down	2023	Skin to Skin EP
"Everything I Do Is For You"	2023	Skin to Skin EP
"A Dozen Roses"	2024	Skin to Skin EP
"Lonely Day" (System of a Down cover)	2024	Non-album single
"Remains of Us"	2024	Non-album single
"Will You Love Me When I'm Dead"	2024	Surrender EP
"Death of Me"	2025	Surrender EP
"Hold onto Me"	2025	Non-album single
"Breakdown"	2026	It Was Only a Dream
"I Don't Want to Fall in Love"	2026	It Was Only a Dream
"Funeral"	2026	It Was Only a Dream

=== As featured artist ===
List of singles as featured artist
Title	Year	Album
"Bazooka" (Casey Edwards and Amira Elfeky)	2026	Devil May Cry: Season 2
"Paradise" (I Prevail featuring Amira Elfeky)	2026	Non-album single

== Awards and nominations ==
Heavy Music Awards

Year	Nominee / work	Award	Result
2025	Amira Elfeky	Best International Breakthrough Artist	Nominated
