= Bow Down (I Prevail song) =

Single by I Prevail

from the album Trauma
- Released: February 26, 2019
- Recorded: 2018
- Genre: Nu metalcore; metalcore
- Length: 4:03
- Label: Fearless
- Songwriters: Brian Burkheiser; Eric Vanlerberghe; Steve Menoian; David Pramik; Tyler Smyth

I Prevail singles chronology
"Lifelines" (2017)	"Bow Down" (2019)	"Breaking Down" (2019)

"Bow Down" is a song by the American rock band I Prevail, released in February 2019 as the first single from their second studio album Trauma. The song received a Grammy Nomination for the Grammy Award for Best Metal Performance for the 62nd Annual Grammy Awards.

== Background ==
The song was first released on February 26, 2019, a month before the release of its respective album, Trauma. A music video was released at the same time. It was the first single to be released from the album, being released twelve hours before "Breaking Down", and the first to be released since vocalist Brian Burkheiser had recovered from his surgery for a polyp on his vocal cords in 2017. Burkheiser struggled with the recovery, and anxiety and depressions on how to continue with the band after its rise to popularity, but overcame it to record the album, including the track, across 2018.

In November 2019, the song was nominated for the Grammy Award for Best Metal Performance.

== Themes and composition ==
Lyrically, the song is about the band venting their criticisms of the music industry.

== Reception ==
Metal Injection praised the song for its "crunchy [guitar] riffs, memorable breakdowns and a catchy hook". MetalSucks singled out the verses as being especially good, enjoying the screamed vocals and guitar parts as "heavy and fun".

== Personnel ==
- Brian Burkheiser – clean vocals
- Eric Vanlerberghe – unclean vocals
- Steve Menoian – lead guitar, bass
- Dylan Bowman – rhythm guitar
- Gabe Helguera – drums

== Charts ==
Chart (2019)	Peak position
US Hot Rock Songs (Billboard)	32

== Certifications ==
Certifications for "Bow Down"
Region	Certification	Certified units/sales
Australia (ARIA)	Gold	35,000^{‡}
^{‡} Sales+streaming figures based on certification alone.
