= Trauma (I Prevail album) =

Studio album by I Prevail
- Released: March 29, 2019
- Genres: Melodic metalcore; pop metal
- Length: 40:56
- Label: Fearless
- Producer: Tyler Smyth

I Prevail chronology
Lifelines (2016)	Trauma (2019)	True Power (2022)

Singles from Trauma
- 1. "Bow Down" Released: February 26, 2019; 2. "Breaking Down" Released: February 26, 2019; 3. "Paranoid" Released: March 18, 2019; 4. "Hurricane" Released: April 2, 2019; 5. "Every Time You Leave" Released: July 21, 2020

Trauma is the second studio album by the American rock band I Prevail, released on March 29, 2019. The album was the fourth best-selling album of the week in the US upon release, and its second single, "Breaking Down", hit the top 10 of the Billboard Mainstream Rock Songs chart in May 2019. Two Grammy nominations were received in relation to the album: Trauma received a nomination for Grammy Award for Best Rock Album, while the song "Bow Down" received a nomination for the Grammy Award for Best Metal Performance.

== Background and themes ==
The album's creation was heavily affected by the band's earlier rise to fame, complications, and struggles with depression. The band received a quick rise to fame with the release of a Taylor Swift cover of the song "Blank Space", followed by their debut album, Lifelines. However, in 2017, frontman Brian Burkheiser had a polyp in his vocal cords, halting their 2017 tour and momentum; this caused Burkheiser to spiral into depression. Despite the band almost breaking up during this time, they instead found inspiration to make an album around the concepts they had been struggling with. The album's emphasis on mental health was also inspired by the death of Kyle Pavone of We Came as Romans, of which the band had toured with in 2017. Guitarist Dylan Bowman outlined the album in comparison to Lifelines:

"Lifelines was about what happens in the wake of getting popular off of the cover we released on our current album. Lifelines is a continuation of that, and how it affects our lives. Trauma is more along the lines of the things that have happened since we have been touring and relationships that have been severed because of our lifestyle and how we’re away from home. A lot of people don’t realise how hard it is to keep a relationship when you’re gone nine months out of the year."

The band spent 10 months of 2018 recording the album.

== Sound and composition ==
Band member Eric Vanlerberghe described the band's approach to the album:

This is probably the most eclectic we could've sounded on a record. We don't want to scare people away and say, 'It doesn't have metal on it, it doesn't have rock on it.' But with all these musicians and artists saying rock and roll and metal is dead, we just wanted to write a record that was a big middle finger to them all... not every song is gonna be a riff-driven song, but we didn't just drop all the rock out of it and go to a pop record. We wanted to stay true to our roots, but experiment and evolve...don't say rock is dead because there are ways to make rock fresh and different.

He also said that the band was entirely in control of the album's sound and direction unlike their prior album, Lifelines, which the band felt received too much outside input on its direction. The band sought to create a more original sound after the common criticism that the band's talents were squandered under the "cookie-cutter", generic sound of Lifelines. Guitarist Dylan Bowman described the approach as pushing the limits of the band's sound in two directions, both as its most poppy, and its most heavy.

== Release ==
On February 19, 2019, the band announced that their forthcoming album was called Trauma. Three songs and music videos were released in advance of the album: "Breaking Down" and "Bow Down" in February, and "Paranoid" in March. The album was released on March 29, 2019. It debuted at number four on the Billboard Top Album Sales chart. It placed at number 14 overall on the Billboard 200 chart, which factors in music streaming and album equivalent units. As of March 2020, the album has earned 181,000 album equivalent units.

A music video for "Hurricane" was released shortly after the album's release as well.

== Reception ==
Professional ratings
Review scores
Source	Rating
Exclaim!	6/10
Dead Press!	7/10 stars
Wall of Sound	9/10

The album was generally well received. Wall of Sound praised the band's efforts to "push musical boundaries", praising the album for instill[ing] a newfound appreciation of how absolutely talented these guys are because the way every song manages to stand so well on their own has to be highly praised. I Prevail have definitely outdone themselves, redefining their sound. Loudwire named the album one of the best rock albums so far in a mid-year review of 2019.

Two Grammy nominations were received in relation to the album: Trauma received a nomination for Grammy Award for Best Rock Album, while the song "Bow Down" received a nomination for the Grammy Award for Best Metal Performance.

== Track listing ==
All tracks are written by Brian Burkheiser, Eric Vanleberghe, Steve Menonian, and Tyler Smyth, with additional writers where noted.

No.	Title	Writer(s)	Length
1.	"Bow Down"	David Pramik	4:02
2.	"Paranoid"	Pramik	2:24
3.	"Every Time You Leave" (featuring Delaney Jane)	Bernard James Perry; Delaney Jane; Erik Ron; John August Pregler	3:36
4.	"Rise Above It" (featuring Justin Stone)		3:04
5.	"Breaking Down"	Pramik	3:26
6.	"DOA"	Perry; Pramik; Pregler	3:16
7.	"Gasoline"		2:33
8.	"Hurricane"	Perry; Pregler	3:43
9.	"Let Me Be Sad"	Ron	3:34
10.	"Low"	Perry; Pregler; Jon Eberhard	2:45
11.	"Goodbye (Interlude)"		1:42
12.	"Deadweight"	Ron	3:04
13.	"I Don't Belong Here"		3:41
Total length:			40:50

== Personnel ==
I Prevail

- Brian Burkheiser – clean vocals
- Eric Vanlerberghe – unclean vocals
- Steve Menoian – lead guitar, bass
- Dylan Bowman – rhythm guitar, backing vocals
- Gabe Helguera – drums

Guest

- Delaney Jane – vocals on "Every Time You Leave"
- Justin Stone – rap vocals on "Rise Above It"

Production

- Tyler Smyth – producer
- Mike Winkelmann – cover artwork
- Ted Jensen – mastering

== Charts ==
=== Weekly charts ===
Weekly chart performance for Trauma
Chart (2019)	Peak position
Australian Albums (ARIA)	6
Austrian Albums (Ö3 Austria)	38
Belgian Albums (Ultratop Flanders)	172
Canadian Albums (Billboard)	22
German Albums (Offizielle Top 100)	32
Scottish Albums (Official Charts)	58
Swiss Albums (Schweizer Hitparade)	58
UK Albums (Official Charts)	60
UK Rock & Metal Albums (OCC)	3
US Billboard 200	14
US Top Rock Albums (Billboard)	2

=== Year-end charts ===
Year-end chart performance for Trauma
Chart (2019)	Position
US Top Current Album Sales (Billboard)	161
US Top Rock Albums (Billboard)	89

== Certifications ==
Certifications for Trauma
Region	Certification	Certified units/sales
Canada (Music Canada)	Gold	40,000^{‡}
United Kingdom (BPI)	Silver	60,000^{‡}
^{‡} Sales+streaming figures based on certification alone.

== Awards and nominations ==
Grammy Awards

Year	Nominee / work	Award	Result
2019	"Bow Down"	Best Metal Performance	Nominated
2019	Trauma	Best Rock Album	Nominated
