= I Prevail =

American rock band

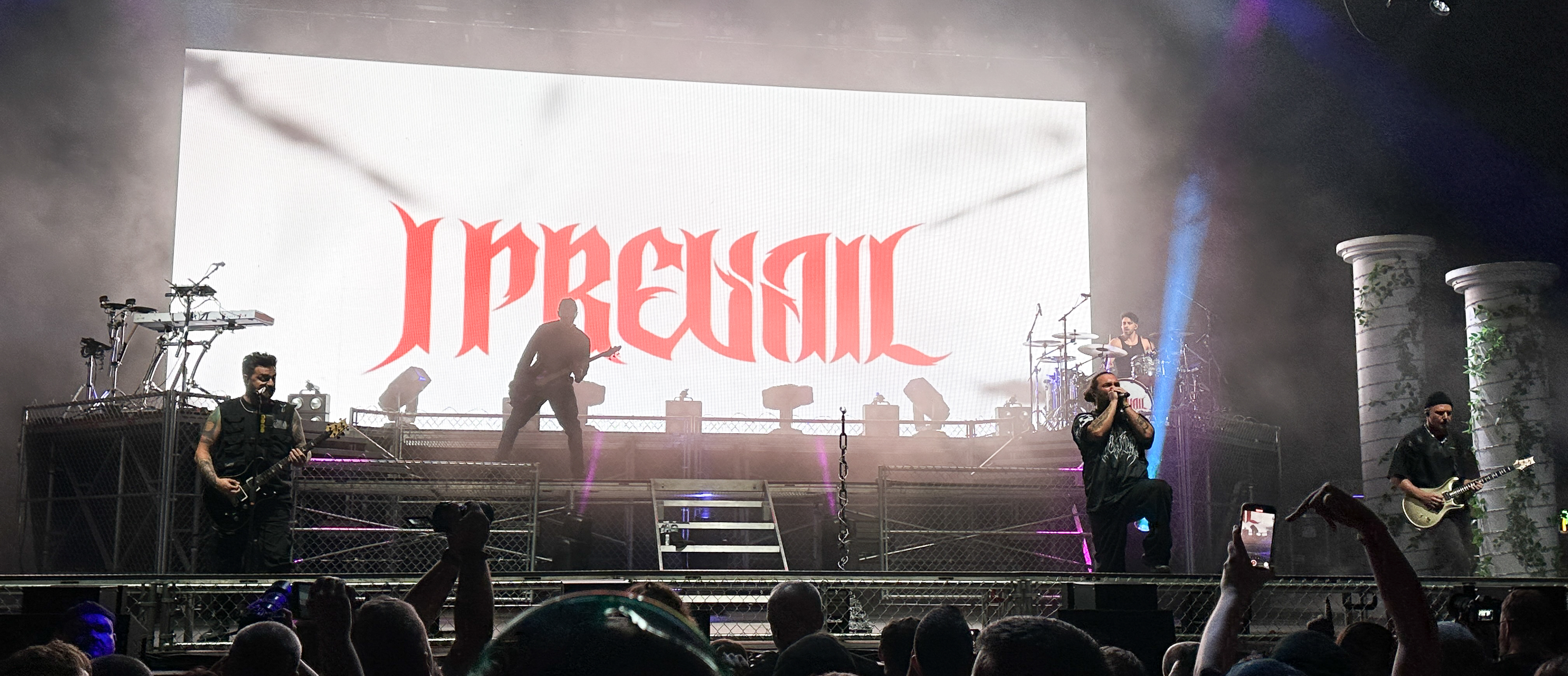
- I Prevail performing for the Summer of Loud Tour in 2025.

Background information
- Origin: Southfield, Michigan, U.S.
- Genres: Post-hardcore; metalcore; pop-punk; hard rock; nu metal
- Works: I Prevail discography
- Years active: 2013–present
- Label: Fearless
- Members: Eric Vanlerberghe; Steve Menoian; Dylan Bowman; Gabe Helguera; Jon Eberhard
- Past members: Jordan Berger; Tony Camposeo; Lee Runestad; Brian Burkheiser
- Website: iprevailband.com

I Prevail is an American rock band formed in Southfield, Michigan, in 2013. They released their debut EP Heart vs. Mind (2014) and rose to popularity from releasing a metal cover of Taylor Swift's "Blank Space" as a single, which eventually was certified platinum in the US. The band has since released four studio albums: Lifelines (2016), Trauma (2019), True Power (2022), and Violent Nature (2025). The band found success with their original material as well, with the singles "Breaking Down" and "Hurricane" performing well on rock radio, the single "Bow Down" being nominated for the Grammy Award for Best Metal Performance in 2019, and Trauma being nominated for the Grammy Award for Best Rock Album the same year. Since its formation, the band has undergone several lineup changes, with lead vocalist Eric Vanlerberghe and lead guitarist Steve Menoian being the band's only two constant members.

== History ==
=== Formation, breakthrough, Heart vs. Mind EP (2014–2016) ===
I Prevail was formed in late 2013. On December 1, 2014, the band posted a cover of Taylor Swift's "Blank Space" to YouTube. It peaked at number 90 on the Billboard Hot 100 and at number 23 on the US Mainstream Rock Songs chart. The cover was certified platinum in 2019. On December 10, 2014, the band released the first two singles from the EP, "Love, Lust, and Liars" and "The Enemy". The band released their debut EP, Heart vs. Mind, on December 17, 2014. In 2014 and 2015, before the recording of their debut album, rhythm guitarist Jordan Berger left the band. The band added touring members Tony Camposeo on bass and Dylan Bowman on rhythm guitar who, later, became full-time members. The band embarked on the Heart vs. Mind Tour and the Massive Addictive Tour. On June 24, 2015, they announced a summer tour called The Crossroads Tour. The band opened for Crown the Empire and Hollywood Undead in September and October 2015 on Day of the Dead Tour and played select shows, as well as opening for Pop Evil in December.

=== Lifelines and touring (2016–2019) ===
On May 17, 2016, the band announced their headlining Strike the Match Tour throughout the summer, with special guests The White Noise, My Enemies & I, and Bad Seed Rising. On June 20, 2016, the band revealed the name of their debut album, Lifelines, and on July 21, 2016 announced it would be available from October 21, 2016. The first single from the album, "Scars", was released on July 1, 2016. On July 19, 2016, I Prevail announced through social media that they would be supporting Pierce the Veil alongside Neck Deep on the Journey's Made to Destroy tour from September to October 2016. On August 14, 2016, the band released the second single from the album, "Stuck in Your Head". On September 28, 2016, the band released their third single "Come and Get It" through Short.Fast.Loud, an Australian-based punk and hardcore radio show on youth station Triple J. In December 2016, it was announced that bassist Tony Camposeo left the band to focus on producing music.

On March 22, 2017, I Prevail's participation in the 2017 Vans Warped Tour was confirmed. In late March/early April 2017, the band had their first major overseas headline tour, which included sold-out shows across Australia. On May 30, 2017, I Prevail announced the departures of Lee Runestad and that he would be replaced by Eli Clark as touring bassist and Gabe Helguera of Drum Beats Online as touring drummer. On August 8, 2017, I Prevail announced a fall-winter headline tour with The Word Alive, We Came as Romans, and Escape the Fate. Brian Burkheiser was put on emergency vocal rest and temporary hiatus due to a serious vocal cord injury.

=== Trauma (2019–2022) ===
On February 19, 2019, the band announced an upcoming album called Trauma and asked fans to share the announcement on social media 100,000 times before they released the first single. On February 26, 2019, the band released the lead single from the album, "Bow Down". Later that same day the band released "Breaking Down", a second track from the album. Along with the new single being released, Gabe Helguera was made a full time member of the band although Eli Clark was absent from both new music videos. According to Eli's LinkedIn profile he left the band in January 2019.

While in Australia for the Download Festival in March 2019. On March 18, 2019, the band released the third single off the new album, "Paranoid". Trauma was released on March 29, 2019. The album was the fourth-best selling album of the week in the US upon release, while its first single, "Breaking Down", hit the top 10 of the Billboard Mainstream Rock Songs chart in May 2019. On August 6, 2019, A Day to Remember announced that I Prevail, Beartooth, and Can't Swim would be supporting them on their "Degenerates" headlining tour. In November 2019, the band received two Grammy nominations; the Best Rock Album for Trauma, and the Best Metal Performance for "Bow Down".

=== True Power (2022–2024) ===
On June 17, 2022, the band released the single "Body Bag". The song is the lead single for their third studio album True Power, which was released on August 19, 2022. On July 12, 2022, the band released the second single "Bad Things". On August 19, 2022, the band released a music video for the song "Self-Destruction". In June 2022, the band announced their True Power Tour starting in Asbury Park, New Jersey with openers; Pierce the Veil, Fit for a King, and Stand Atlantic (October 24 – November 22 shows) and Yours Truly (September 9 – October 9 shows). They toured from September 9 to November 22, ending in Detroit, Michigan. On November 22, 2022, the band released a music video for the song "There's Fear In Letting Go". On March 16, 2023, the band released a music video for the song "Deep End".

In May 2024, it was announced that vocalist Brian Burkheiser would be absent from touring until July. In an Instagram post, Burkheiser stated that he was recovering from surgery for a rare condition known as Eagle syndrome. On June 6, 2024, the band released the song, "Can U See Me In the Dark?" with Halestorm. On September 17, 2024, the band released a collaboration single with All Time Low called "Hate This Song".

=== Brian Burkheiser's departure and Violent Nature (2025–present) ===
On May 15, 2025, the band announced on social media that they had officially parted ways with Brian Burkheiser. On May 23, the band released the single "Violent Nature". On June 20, the band released another single, "Into Hell". On July 15, the band's upcoming fourth studio album, Violent Nature, was announced, released on September 19. On July 18, the album's third single, "Rain", was released. On August 15, the band released the album's fourth single, "Annihilate Me". On the same day of the album's release, I Prevail also released a music video for the song "Pray".

During the Summer of 2025, they were headliners for the 2025 Summer of Loud Tour along with Beartooth, Parkway Drive, and Killswitch Engage, with the Amity Affliction, The Devil Wears Prada, and Alpha Wolf as the special guests, and TX2, Kingdom of Giants, and Dark Divine opening the shows for them. In October 2025, the band announced their Violent Nature European tour, set to take place in September and October of 2026, with support from Polaris and Amira Elfeky. I Prevail collaborated with Elfeky on a standalone single titled "Paradise," which was released on June 26, 2026.

== Musical style ==
I Prevail's musical style has been described as post-hardcore, metalcore, pop-punk, hard rock, and nu metal. The band combines elements of metal, alternative, electronic, hip hop, trap, trap metal, rap, and pop.

James Christopher Monger of AllMusic described the band's sound as a "blistering blend of metalcore, pop-punk, and post-hardcore that invokes names like Bring Me the Horizon, We Came as Romans, and A Day to Remember."

== Band members ==
Current

- Eric Vanlerberghe – lead vocals (2013–present)
- Steve Menoian – lead guitar (2013–present), studio bass (2014–2015, 2017–2025)
- Dylan Bowman – rhythm guitar, backing and lead vocals (2015–present)
- Gabe Helguera – drums, percussion (2019–present; touring 2017–2019)
- Jon Eberhard – bass, keyboards, auxiliary percussion, backing vocals (2025–present; touring 2023–2025)

Former members

- Jordan Berger – rhythm guitar, backing vocals (2013–2015)
- Tony Camposeo – bass guitar (2014–2016)
- Lee Runestad – drums (2013–2017)
- Brian Burkheiser – lead vocals (2013–2025)

Former touring musicians

- Eli Clark – bass, backing vocals (2016–2019)

Timeline

== Discography ==
Studio albums

- Lifelines (2016)
- Trauma (2019)
- True Power (2022)
- Violent Nature (2025)

== Awards and nominations ==
Grammy Awards

Year	Nominee / work	Award	Result	Ref.
2019	"Bow Down"	Best Metal Performance	Nominated	
2019	Trauma	Best Rock Album	Nominated	

Loudwire Music Awards

Year	Nominee / work	Award	Result	Ref.
2017	"Alone"	Hard Rock Song of the Year	Won	

Nik Nocturnal Awards

Year	Nominee / work	Award	Result	Ref.
2025	Eric Vanlerberghe	Vocalist of the Year	Nominated	
2025	"Violent Nature"	Angriest Song of the Year	Won	
