= Lifelines (I Prevail album) =

Studio album by I Prevail
- Released: October 21, 2016
- Recorded: 2014–2015
- Genre: Post-hardcore; metalcore; pop-punk
- Length: 43:48
- Label: Fearless
- Producer: BJ Perry; John Pregler

I Prevail chronology
Heart vs. Mind (2014)	Lifelines (2016)	Trauma (2019)

Singles from Lifelines
- 1. "Scars" Released: July 1, 2016; 2. "Stuck in Your Head" Released: August 12, 2016; 3. "Alone" Released: October 2016; 4. "Come and Get It" Released: May 13, 2017; 5. "Lifelines" Released: August 2017

Professional ratings
Review scores
Source	Rating
New Noise	2.5/5 stars
Rock Sound	7/10

Lifelines is the debut studio album by the American rock band I Prevail, released on October 21, 2016, with their first single from the album being "Scars".

== Description ==
Lifeline is the first album recorded by I Prevail. It was released on October 21, 2016 via Fearless Records.

"Scars" was released as their first single from the album, on July 1, 2016. It is the only studio release to feature original bassist Tony Camposeo and original drummer Lee Runestad.

The album charted at number 15 on the Billboard 200, selling 19,500 copies in its first week. It had sold about 93,000 copies in the US alone as of September 2017. It is their only album to receive a certification award, being certified gold by Music Canada in September 2021.

== Use of tracks ==
"Come and Get It" was the official theme song for NXT TakeOver: Orlando in 2017 and All Elite Wrestling's All Out in 2019.

"RISE" was featured in Forza Horizon 4 in 2018.

"Lifelines" was used in a video package for The Young Bucks vs. Lucha Brothers match at All Out.

== Track listing ==
No.	Title	Length
1.	"Scars"	3:49
2.	"Stuck in Your Head"	3:34
3.	"Lifelines"	3:21
4.	"Come and Get It"	3:01
5.	"Chaos"	3:32
6.	"Alone"	3:41
7.	"Outcast"	3:04
8.	"RISE"	3:14
9.	"Already Dead"	2:40
10.	"Pull the Plug"	3:17
11.	"One More Time"	3:13
12.	"My Heart I Surrender"	3:27
13.	"Worst Part of Me"	3:52
Total length:		43:48

Walmart bonus track
No.	Title	Length
14.	"Come and Get It (live version)"

== Personnel ==
I Prevail

- Brian Burkheiser – clean vocals
- Eric Vanlerberghe – unclean vocals, clean vocals on "Lifelines"
- Dylan Bowman – rhythm guitar, backing vocals
- Steve Menoian – lead guitar
- Tony Camposeo – bass guitar
- Lee Runestad – drums

Production

- BJ Perry – production, additional clean mixing
- John Pregler – production
- Drew Fulk – additional production
- David Bendeth – mixing
- Ted Jensen – mastering at Sterling Sound, New York, NY
- Jesse Josefsson – additional programming

Management

- Rick Smith and Dana Haddad for Wildjustice Music
- Justin Hirschman – worldwide booking for Artist Group International
- Bob Becker and Chris Foitle – A&R
- Kristin Biskup – project management

Artwork

- Dan Mumford – illustrations
- Sage LaMonica – album design

== Charts ==
Chart (2016)	Peak position
Australian Albums (ARIA)	8
Canadian Albums (Billboard)	17
New Zealand Heatseekers Albums (RMNZ)	10
Scottish Albums (OCC)	60
UK Albums (OCC)	72
UK Rock & Metal Albums (OCC)	5
US Billboard 200	15
US Top Rock Albums (Billboard)	5

== Certifications ==
Region	Certification	Certified units/sales
Canada (Music Canada)	Gold	40,000^{‡}
United States (RIAA)	Gold	500,000^{‡}
^{‡} Sales+streaming figures based on certification alone.
