= Brian Burkheiser =

American singer (born 1993)

- Also known as: Scatterbrain
- Born: April 6, 1993 (age 33); Southfield, Michigan, U.S.
- Genres: Post-hardcore; metalcore; pop-punk; alternative metal; nu metal
- Occupations: Singer; songwriter
- Years active: 2013–present
- Formerly of: I Prevail

Brian Burkheiser (born April 6, 1993) also known as Scatterbrain, is an American singer-songwriter. He is best known as the former co-founder and clean vocalist for the rock band I Prevail.

== Early life ==
Brian Burkheiser is from the state of Michigan, United States. He was born on April 6, 1993 in the Detroit suburb of Southfield.

== Career ==
=== 2012: Until The End ===
When Burkheiser was in college, he joined a band called Until The End and began working with a producer named BJ Perry. He eventually dropped out of college after deciding he wanted to pursue a career in music; and got a job as a delivery person at Domino's Pizza to support himself financially.

In 2012, with Burkheiser as their lead singer, Until The End released an EP titled "A Hundred Lies". That same year, they also released a few singles: a cover of the Justin Bieber song Beauty and a Beat, a cover of the Goo Goo Dolls song Iris, and an original song titled State of Corruption.

=== 2013–2025: I Prevail ===
In late 2013, Burkheiser co-founded the metalcore band I Prevail. The band released their first song on December 1, 2014, which was a cover of Taylor Swift's hit "Blank Space". It was featured on their debut EP Heart vs. Mind, which was released later that same month. I Prevail's "Blank Space" peaked at number 90 on Billboard's hot 100 chart and reached number 9 on Barometer's Hot Rock Songs Chart. In March of 2015 I Prevail signed with Fearless Records, and "Blank Space" was re-released the following November as part of Fearless Record's Punk Goes Pop Volume six. The song became certified gold that year and then certified platinum in August of 2019.

I Prevail released their debut album Lifelines on October 21 2016. In March of 2019 I Prevail released their second album Trauma, which hit the number 14 on the U.S. album charts and number 9 in Australia. Trauma received a Grammy nomination for best rock album while "Bow Down", which was one of the singles featured on the album, was nominated for best metal performance. On August 19, 2022, I Prevail released their third album True Power.

On May 15, 2025, I Prevail announced Burkheiser's departure from the band through a statement on social media saying that they were mutually parting ways with Burkheiser and that going forward co-lead vocalist Eric Vanlerberghe and rhythm guitarist Dylan Bowman would be handling vocals.

=== 2025–present: Scatterbrain ===
Shortly after his departure from I Prevail, Burkheiser announced his new solo project called Scatterbrain and subsequently began teasing his new single "Phases". He originally planned to release the song in August of 2025, however a legal dispute with I Prevail's record label barred him from releasing it. He opted instead to release a cover of the Taylor Swift song "Look What You Made Me Do" in December, as his first official release as Scatterbrain. After eventually resolving the legal dispute he finally released "Phases", on February 13, 2026. On March 26, 2026, he released his third single, "Fast Lane”. On July 17, 2026, he released his fourth single, "Bitter" which also became a theme song for AEW Redemption. On September 25, 2026, he released his fifth single, “Addicted To The Habit”.

== Personal life ==
Burkheiser describes himself as an introvert and said that his mental health was negatively affected while he was on Warped Tour 2017 with I Prevail, due to him not getting sufficient alone time.

In the fall of 2017, Burkheiser suffered a vocal injury while touring with I Prevail. Upon being examined by a doctor it was discovered that Burkheiser had a polyp on one of his vocal cords. Due to the polyp not responding to treatment or healing on its own, it had to be surgically removed. Unfortunately, the following year he began to feel like "something was wrong". Years later he was diagnosed with Eagle Syndrome, a rare medical condition that causes pain or discomfort in the face and neck area due to an elongated styloid process or a calcified stylohyoid ligament. In February of 2024, Burkheiser had two surgeries to remove calcification from both sides of his neck.

He has also received help for his depression.

On June 19, 2021, Burkheiser married his wife, Caylin Burkheiser (née Scott), after nearly 8 years of dating. The two had a son in January 2025.

In 2025, following his split with I Prevail, Burkheiser's mental health began to deteriorate. He took a trip to Beverly Hills to be away from home for a while and work on new music, however during the trip he ended up going into a manic episode. Eventually his family decided to intervene, and they took him to a psychiatric facility, where he was admitted for a week. In an interview with Rock Feed, Burkheiser said that he believes the manic episode lasted for months, and that even after leaving the psychiatric facility he was still a little bit manic.

== Discography ==
=== I Prevail ===
- Heart vs. Mind (EP) (2014)
- Lifelines (Album) (2016)
- Trauma (Album) (2019)
- True Power (Album) (2022)

=== Scatterbrain ===
==== Singles ====
Year	Single	Peak chart positions
Year	Single	US Hard Rock Digi.
2025	"Look What You Made Me Do"	—
2026	"Phases"	10
2026	"Fast Lane"	6
2026	"Bitter"	×
2026	"Addicted To the Habit"	×
2026	"Here We Go Again"	×

==== Music videos ====
Year	Song	Director
2025	"Look What You Made Me Do"	Ben Proulx
2026	"Phases"	Kurt Mackey and Brian Burkheiser
2026	"Fast Lane"	Ben Proulx
2026	"Bitter"	Ben Proulx
2026	"Addicted To the Habit"	Kurt Mackey
2026	"Here We Go Again"	Kurt Mackey
