= Loona (singer) discography =

Loona discography
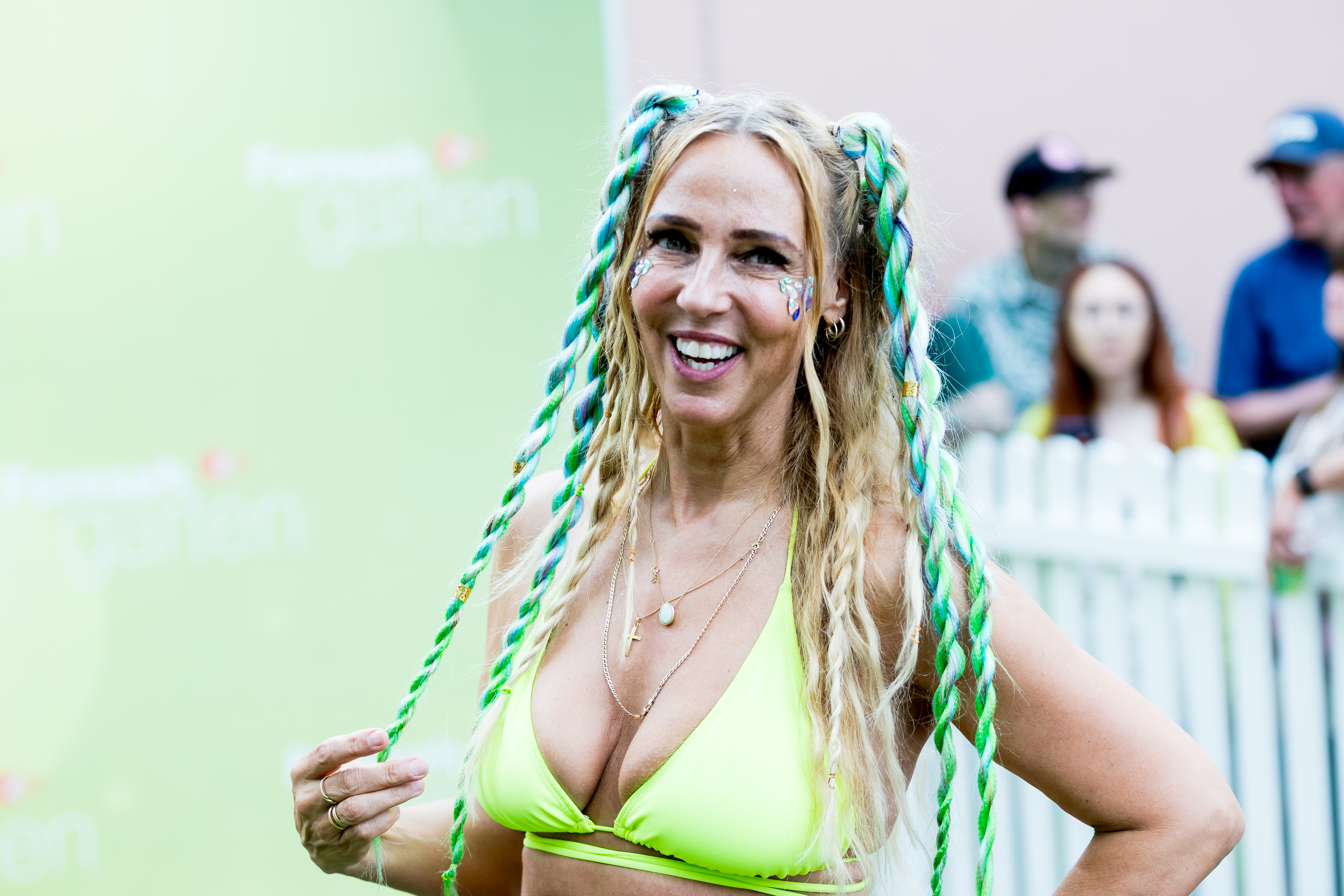
- Loona in 2025.
- Studio albums: 7
- Compilation albums: 3
- Singles: 37
- Music videos: 42
- Promotional singles: 7
- EP: 2

The discography of Loona, a Dutch singer, consists of 7 studio albums, 3 compilation albums, 2 extended plays, 37 singles, including 12 as featured artist, 8 promotional singles, and 42 music videos, including 12 as featured artist. Loona was first featured on numerous singles by DJ Sammy under the artist name Carisma. The first release as Loona was the debut studio album Lunita in 1999, preceded by "Bailando", a Paradisio cover version, and Mecano's "Hijo de la Luna", both released in 1998. This success was followed with Entre dos aguas in 2000, preceded by "Mamboleo", a cover version of Herbert Grönemeyer's song "Mambo", which has been removed on later pressings. The albums Colors, Wind of Time, Moonrise and Rakatakata (Un Rayo de Sol) followed in 2002, 2005, 2008 and 2013 respectively. In 2014, Loona released her first single "Ademloos door de Nacht" under her real name Marie-José van der Kolk, a Dutch-language cover version of German singer Helene Fischer's single "Atemlos durch die Nacht".

== Albums ==
=== Studio albums ===
List of albums, with selected chart positions
Title	Album details	Peak chart positions		
Title	Album details	AUT	GER	SWI
Lunita	Released: 1999; Formats: CD, cassette	8	13	7
Entre dos aguas	Released: 2000; Formats: CD, cassette	—	57	49
Colors	Released: 2002; Formats: CD, digital download	—	84	—
Wind of Time	Released: 2005; Formats: CD, digital download	—	—	—
Moonrise	Released: 2008; Formats: CD, digital download	—	—	—
Rakatakata (Un Rayo de Sol)	Released: 2013; Formats: CD, digital download	—	—	—
Badam	Released: 2016; Formats: CD, digital download	—	—	—

=== Compilation albums ===
List of compilation albums
Year	Title
2000	Greatest Hits
2001	Baila mi ritmo
2007	Everybody on the Floor
2020	Stars

== EPs ==
List of EPs
Year	Title
2008	Famous 5
2014	Brazil

== Singles ==
List of singles, with selected chart positions and certifications, showing year released and album name
Year	Title	Chart positions						Certifications	Album
Year	Title	NL	AUT	FRA	GER	SPA	SWI	Certifications	Album
1998	"Bailando"	13	3	—	1	—	1	AUT: Gold; GER: Platinum; SUI: Gold	Lunita
1998	"Hijo de la Luna"	18	3	—	1	—	2	GER: 3× Gold; SUI: Gold	Lunita
1999	"Dónde Vas"	—	—	—	26	—	40		Lunita
1999	"Mamboleo" (Note: Due to lawsuit reasons "Mamboleo" has been removed from later pressings of "Entre dos Aguas", but re-appeared on Loona's compilation album "Greatest Hits" in 2000.)	—	8	—	3	—	4		Entre Dos Aguas (Deluxe Edition)
1999	"Salvador Dalí"	—	—	—	63	—	80		Entre Dos Aguas
2000	"La Vida es una Flor"	—	—	—	55	—	—		Entre Dos Aguas
2000	"Latino Lover"	—	9	—	6	—	6		Greatest Hits
2001	"Baila mi Ritmo"	—	52	—	40	11	34		Colors
2001	"Viva el Amor"	—	—	—	42	1	75		Colors
2002	"Rhythm of the Night"	—	18	—	4	—	30		Colors
2002	"Colors"	—	—	—	79	—	—		Colors
2004	"Tears in Heaven"	—	—	—	46	—	—		Wind of Time
2005	"Oye el Boom"	—	70	—	32	—	44		Everybody on the Floor
2008	"Por la Noche"	—	—	—	64	—	—		Moonrise
2008	"Salam Aleikoum"	—	—	—	—	—	—		Moonrise
2009	"Parapapapapa"	—	—	—	34	—	—		Rakatakata (Un Rayo de Sol)
2010	"Vamos a la Playa"	—	—	4	32	—	16		Rakatakata (Un Rayo de Sol)
2010	"El Cucaracho, El Muchacho" (featuring Movetown)	—	—	—	67	—	—		Rakatakata (Un Rayo de Sol)
2011	"El Tiburón"	—	—	—	43	—	—		Rakatakata (Un Rayo de Sol)
2012	"Policia"	—	—	—	—	—	—		Rakatakata (Un Rayo de Sol)
2013	"Rakatakata (Un Rayo de Sol)"	—	—	—	47	—	—		Rakatakata (Un Rayo de Sol)
2013	"Caliente"	58	—	—	—	—	—		Rakatakata (Un Rayo de Sol)
2014	"Brazil"	—	—	—	—	—	—		Brazil
2016	"Badam"	—	—	—	—	—	—		Badam
2017	"Summer of Love"	—	—	—	—	—	—		Non-album singles
2020	"Alquien Canto"	—	—	—	—	—	—		Non-album singles
2021	"Life Is Just a Game 2021"	—	—	—	—	—	—		Non-album singles

=== Promotional singles ===
List of promotional singles, with showing year released and album name
Year	Title	Album
2000	"Navidad"	Entre Dos Aguas
2001	"Can't Help Falling in Love"	Colors
2007	"Everybody on the Floor (Uh la la la)"	Everybody on the Floor
2012	"Oh la la dance avec moi"	Rakatakata (Un Rayo de Sol)
2013	"Shalalalala"	Rakatakata (Un Rayo de Sol)
2014	"Ademloos door de Nacht" (Note: "Ademloos door de Nacht" has been released under her real name Marie-José van der Kolk.)	
2015	"OMG! Dein Body ist so Heiß" (featuring Ko&Ko)	
2016	"On va danser" (with Tale & Dutch featuring P. Moody)	

=== Featured singles ===
List of singles, with selected chart positions and certifications, showing year released and album name
Year	Title	Chart positions						Album
Year	Title	NL	AUT	FRA	GER	SPA	SWI	Album
1995	"Life Is Just a Game" (DJ Sammy featuring Carisma)	—	—	—	62	—	—	Life Is Just a Game
1996	"You're My Angel" (DJ Sammy featuring Carisma)	—	—	—	—	—	—	Life Is Just a Game
1997	"Prince of Love" (DJ Sammy featuring Carisma)	—	—	—	24	—	—	Life Is Just a Game
1997	"Golden Child" (DJ Sammy featuring Carisma)	—	—	—	43	—	—	Life Is Just a Game
1998	"Magic Moment" (DJ Sammy featuring Carisma)	—	—	—	67	—	—	Life Is Just a Game
1999	"In 2 Eternity" (DJ Sammy featuring Carisma)	—	—	—	31	—	48	DJ Sammy at Work (In the Mix)
2002	"Sunlight" (DJ Sammy featuring Loona)	28	58	—	50	—	—	Heaven
2002	"The Boys of Summer" (DJ Sammy featuring Loona & Mel)	19	49	—	25	—	—	Heaven
2004	"Rise Again" (DJ Sammy featuring Loona)	—	—	—	53	—	88	The Rise
2013	"Tell It to My Heart" (Cassey Doreen & Loona)	—	—	—	—	—	—	My Diamonds & Pearls
2016	"Banana Coconut" (Tom Lehel featuring Loona)	—	—	—	—	—	—	Super Helden Dance
2016	"The Only Way Is Up" (Rebelfox featuring Loona)	—	—	—	—	—	—	Non-album singles
2017	"Get Up" (Rebelfox featuring Loona)	—	—	—	—	—	—	Non-album singles
2018	"Turn the Tide" (Dune featuring Loona)	—	—	—	—	—	—	Non-album singles
2020	"Sunny Side of Life" (Captain Jack featuring Loona)	—	—	—	—	—	—	Non-album singles

== Music videos ==
Year	Title	Director(s)
1998	"Bailando"	Wilfried Happel
1998	"Hijo de la Luna"	Patrick Kiely
1999	"Dónde Vas"	Mekano Baby
1999	"Mamboleo"	Christian Schulz
1999	"Mamboleo" (Second Black & White Video)	Christian Schulz
1999	"Salvador Dalí"	Carsten Gutschmidt
2000	"La Vida es una Flor"	
2000	"Navidad"	
2000	"Latino Lover"	
2001	"Baila mi Ritmo"	Bernard Wedig & Wolf Gresenz
2001	"Viva el Amor"	
2002	"Rhythm of the Night"	
2002	"Colors"	
2004	"Tears in Heaven"	Ralf Strathmann
2005	"Oye el Boom"	Joern Heitmann
2008	"Por la Noche"	Erik Lattwein
2008	"Salam Aleikoum"	Sebastian Eberle
2009	"Parapapapapa"	Nikolaj Georgiew
2010	"Vamos a la Playa"	Erik Lattwein
2010	"El Cucaracho, El Muchacho" (featuring Movetown)	
2011	"El Tiburón"	
2012	"Policia"	Piguar
2013	"Rakatakata (Un Rayo de Sol)"	
2013	"Caliente"	
2014	"Brazil"	
2014	"Ademloos door de Nacht"	Wim Geysels
2016	"Badam"	
2016	"On va danser" (with Tale & Dutch featuring P. Moody)	Marc Korn
2017	"Viva el amor" (redux)	Andy Wittmann
2017	"Summer of Love"	Jens Hainbuch
2018	"Bailando" (redux)	Doug Laurent

=== Featured music videos ===
Year	Title	Director(s)
1995	"Life Is Just a Game" (DJ Sammy featuring Carisma)	
1996	"You're My Angel" (DJ Sammy featuring Carisma)	
1997	"Prince of Love" (DJ Sammy featuring Carisma)	
1997	"Golden Child" (DJ Sammy featuring Carisma)	Oliver Sommer
1998	"Magic Moment" (DJ Sammy featuring Carisma)	Oliver Sommer
1999	"In 2 Eternity" (DJ Sammy featuring Carisma)	
2002	"Sunlight" (DJ Sammy featuring Loona)	
2002	"The Boys of Summer" (DJ Sammy featuring Loona & Mel)	
2004	"Rise Again" (DJ Sammy featuring Loona)	Mike Dowse
2013	"Tell It to My Heart" (Cassey Doreen featuring Loona)	Attractive Pictures
2016	"Banana Coconut" (Tom Lehel featuring Loona)	
2016	"The Only Way Is Up" (Rebelfox featuring Loona)	Doug Laurent
