= Brazil (EP) =

EP by Loona
- Released: June 6, 2014
- Recorded: 2014
- Genres: Pop, Dance
- Length: 16:29
- Label: Sony

Loona chronology
| Rakatakata (Un Rayo de Sol) (2013) | Brazil (2014) | Badam (2016) |

Singles from Brazil
- 1. "Brazil" Released: June 6, 2014

Brazil is the second EP by Dutch recording artist Loona. The album was recorded in 2014 and released on June 6, 2014 through Sony.

== Background ==
Between 2009 and 2013, Loona released a string of summervibe tune singles, such as "Vamos a la playa", a Miranda cover, "Parapapapapa", "El Cucaracho, El Muchacho", a collaboration with Movetown, the Pigbag classic ""El Tiburón", "Policia", "Oh la la dance avec moi", the Los Diablos cover version "Rakatakata (Un Rayo de Sol)" or "Caliente". All these singles to be included on her long-awaited, sixth studio album with the working title Summer Dance, later retitled Rakatakata (Un Rayo de Sol). In 2014, when the WM came up, Loona released a 5-Track EP subtitled "Big 5" digitally through iTunes.

== Content ==
The Brazil extended play contains five songs, two of them, which are previously unreleased new songs, and three remixes. The album starts with "Brazil", a summervibe tune song and cover of Francisco Alves's "Aquarela do Brasil", which served as the albums' first and only single. The following two songs are remixes of the previously released Loona cover versions, the Paradisio classic "Bailando", in a Brazilian-language version titled "Dançando" and a Rio version of "Mamboleo", a cover version of Herbert Grönemeyer's song "Mambo", from her first two albums "Lunita" and "Entre dos aguas". The fourth track is the Barry Manilow cover version of Copacabana. The last song is the 2k14 remix of "Rio de Janeiro" with Loona as guest vocalist, a track previously released by only Flava & Stevenson on their album Quantum of Dance. "Brazil" received a music video and was released in 2014.

== Appearances ==
The 2k14 remix of "Rio de Janeiro" was also included on Flava & Stevenson's album Quantum of Dance as a bonus track.

== Track listing ==
| No. | Title | Writer(s) | Length |
|---|---|---|---|
| 1. | "Brazil" | Ary Barroso, Bob Russell, Marie-José van der Kolk | 3:28 |
| 2. | "Dançando" | Luc Rigaux, Patrick Samoy, Garcia Asensio | 3:06 |
| 3. | "Mamboleo (Rio Version)" | Herbert Grönemeyer, Samuel Bouriah | 3:31 |
| 4. | "Copacabana" | Barry Pincus, Jack Feldman, Bruce Sussman | 3:19 |
| 5. | "Rio de Janeiro (2k14 Mix) (with Flava & Stevenson)" | Yves Lendenmann, Brian Abeywickreme | 3:05 |
| Total length: | | | 16:29 |

== Personnel ==
- Loona – vocals
- Flava & Stevenson – guest vocals
