= Fiesta =

Fiesta (Spanish for "religious feast", "festival", or "party") may refer to:

== Events ==
- Patronal festival (fiesta patronal), a yearly Christian religious celebration of a patron saint or virgin
- Fiesta San Antonio, a 10-day event held every April in San Antonio, Texas
- St. Peter's Fiesta, a five-day festival in Gloucester, Massachusetts
- Fiestas de Santa Fe, a festival held in Santa Fe, New Mexico

== Film and television ==
- Fiesta (1941 film), an American film by LeRoy Prinz
- Fiesta (1947 film), an MGM film starring Esther Williams and Ricardo Montalbán
- Fiesta (1995 film), a French film by Pierre Boutron
- Fiesta (TV series), a 1958 Australian music and dance programme

== Music ==
- The Fiestas, an American R&B group

=== Albums ===
- Fiesta (Carlito album), 2006
- Fiesta (Denise Rosenthal album), 2013
- Fiesta (Fiskales Ad-Hok album), 1998
- Fiesta (Miranda album), 1999
- Fiesta (Raffaella Carrà album), 1977
- Fiesta! Magsasaya Ang Lahat, by 6cyclemind, 2006
- Fiesta, by Juan Carlos Alvarado, 2004

=== Songs ===
- "Fiesta" (Helena Paparizou song), 2016
- "Fiesta" (Iz*One song), 2020
- "Fiesta" (The Pogues song), 1988
- "Fiesta" (R. Kelly song), 2001
- "Fiesta" (Soulhead song), 2005
- "Fiesta", by Bomba Estéreo from Amanecer
- "Fiesta", by Ween from La Cucaracha

== Transport ==
- Apco Fiesta, an Israeli paraglider design
- Ford Fiesta, a subcompact car by Ford
- Oldsmobile 88 Fiesta, station wagon variant of Oldsmobile 88
- MS SeaFrance Cézanne or MS Fiesta, a cross-channel ferry operated by SNCF
- MS Stena Fantasia or MS Fiesta, a cross-channel ferry operated by Sealink and Stena Line, now known as the Wawel

== Sports ==
- Fiesta Bowl, an American college football bowl game
- Fiesta logo, color scheme used by the San Antonio Spurs from 1989 to 2002 and later as an alternate

== Other uses ==
- Fiesta (apple), an apple cultivar
- Fiesta (dinnerware), the line of Homer Laughlin China Co. dinnerware
- Fiesta (magazine), a British soft-core porn magazine
- Fiesta (novel) or The Sun Also Rises, a 1926 novel by Ernest Hemingway
- Fiesta Mart, a Texas supermarket chain
- Fiesta Rancho and Fiesta Henderson, defunct casinos in Las Vegas
- Fiesta Online, a 2007 MMORPG video game by OnSon Soft
- Fast Imaging Employing Steady-state Acquisition, a GE brand name for its steady-state free precession imaging technology
- Pump It Up Fiesta, 2010–2013 versions of the Pump It Up video game series
- A condom brand sold by DKT International

== See also ==
- La Fiesta (disambiguation)
- Festival (disambiguation)
