= List of number-one singles of 1997 (Finland) =

This is the list of the number-one singles of the Finnish Singles Chart in 1997.

Issue date	Song	Artist
1/1997	"Anna Mulle Piiskaa"	Apulanta
2/1997	"Anna Mulle Piiskaa"	Apulanta
3/1997	"Breathe"	The Prodigy
4/1997	"Breathe"	The Prodigy
5/1997	"Breathe"	The Prodigy
6/1997	"Breathe"	The Prodigy
7/1997	"Discothèque"	U2
8/1997	"Discothèque"	U2
9/1997	"Discothèque"	U2
10/1997	"Discothèque"	U2
11/1997	"C'mon baby yeah"	Tehosekoitin
12/1997	"C'mon baby yeah"	Tehosekoitin
13/1997	"C'mon baby yeah"	Tehosekoitin
14/1997	"Perseeseen"	Klamydia
15/1997	"Perseeseen"	Klamydia
16/1997	"Perseeseen"	Klamydia
17/1997	"Perseeseen"	Klamydia
18/1997	"Fire"	Scooter
19/1997	"Fire"	Scooter
20/1997	"Fire"	Scooter
21/1997	"Fire"	Scooter
22/1997	"Fire"	Scooter
23/1997	"Fire"	Scooter
24/1997	"Mato"	Apulanta
25/1997	"Mato"	Apulanta
26/1997	"Bailando"	Paradisio
27/1997	"Bailando"	Paradisio
28/1997	"Mato"	Apulanta
29/1997	"Mato"	Apulanta
30/1997	"D'You Know What I Mean?"	Oasis
31/1997	"D'You Know What I Mean?"	Oasis
32/1997	"Mato"	Apulanta
33/1997	"Mato"	Apulanta
34/1997	"The Age of Love"	Scooter
35/1997	"The Age of Love"	Scooter
36/1997	"The Age of Love"	Scooter
37/1997	"Liikaa"	Apulanta
38/1997	"Candle in the Wind 1997"	Elton John
39/1997	"Candle in the Wind 1997"	Elton John
40/1997	"Mitä vaan"	Apulanta
41/1997	"Kosketus"	Klamydia
42/1997	"Liikaa"	Apulanta
43/1997	"Kosketus"	Klamydia
44/1997	"The Memory Remains"	Metallica
45/1997	"The Memory Remains"	Metallica
46/1997	"The Memory Remains"	Metallica
47/1997	"Smack My Bitch Up"	The Prodigy
48/1997	"Smack My Bitch Up"	The Prodigy
49/1997	"Smack My Bitch Up"	The Prodigy
50/1997	"Smack My Bitch Up"	The Prodigy
51/1997	"Pop-musiikkia"	Neljä Baritonia
52/1997	"Pop-Musiikkia"	Neljä Baritonia
