= Dónde Vas =

Single by Loona

from the album Lunita
- Released: 1999
- Recorded: 1998
- Genre: Pop
- Length: 3:53
- Label: Urban
- Songwriter(s): Samuel Bouriah; Marie-José van der Kolk; Henning Reith
- Producer(s): DJ Sammy

Loona singles chronology
"Hijo de la Luna" (1998)	"Dónde Vas" (1999)	"Mamboleo" (1999)

"Dónde Vas" (English: "Where You Go") is a song by Dutch recording artist Loona. It has been released in 1999 through Urban as the third and final single of the debut studio album Lunita. It is also the first original Loona song single release.

== Background ==
After the previous two single releases, the Paradisio's classic "Bailando" and the Mecano cover version Hijo de la Luna, which became massive successes, Loona decided to release a slower uptempo song "Dónde Vas", their first original Loona song release.

== Composition ==
The song is a mixture of a ballad and an uptempo song with a summer vibe feeling. Between refrain and verses, Flamenco guitars can be heard. Loona sings about positive adjustments, the good things in life and if life gets worse, you have to keep your head up high and try and fight. For the slightly edited Sol Radio Edit, the last refrain has been re-recorded with the children's choir "Los Niños Del Sol".

== Commercial performance ==
The song became a moderate success peaking at #26 and #40 at the German and Swiss Single Chart respectively.

== Music video ==
The video has been shot in 1999 in Sweden. To transfer the good moods of the song, the video has been shot in a Spanish flavoured village, where Loona is walking along to meet young and old citizen who lives there. Near the end Loona is singing with a group of children. The video has been produced by Mekano Baby.

== Formats and track listings ==
- CD-Maxi
1. "Dónde Vas" (Sol Radio Edit) - 3:53
2. "Dónde Vas" (Live-At-La-Lambra) - 4:03
3. "Dónde Vas" (Sol Extended) - 5:30
4. "Dónde Vas" (Brilla Del Sol) - 3:58
- Vinyl
1. "Dónde Vas" (Sol Extended) - 5:30
2. "Dónde Vas" (Live-At-La-Lambra) - 4:03
3. "Dónde Vas" (Sol Edit) - 3:53
- CD-Promo
1. "Dónde Vas" (Sol Radio Edit) - 3:53
2. "Dónde Vas" (Sol Extended) - 5:30
3. "Dónde Vas" (Live-At-La-Lambra) - 4:03
4. "Dónde Vas" (Brilla Del Sol) - 3:56

== Credits ==
- Artwork – Marc Schilkowski
- Choir (vocals) – Los Ninos Del Sol
- Co-producer – Henning Reith, Henning Reith
- Guitar (Spanish guitars (guitarra flamenca)), drums (flamenco drums (la caja)) – Los Hijos Del Sol
- Mixed by, arranged by – DJ Sammy, Henning Reith
- Music, lyrics – DJ Sammy, Henning Reith, Marie-José van der Kolk
- Producer – DJ Sammy
- Vocals – Marie-José van der Kolk

== Notes ==
- Mixed and arranged at Casa de La Loona/ The Moon.
- Special thanx to Los Ninos Del Sol (Eduardo & Sara Jaramago, Juana & Jennifer Gonzalez, Marcos Huertas Jr., Laura Huertas, Rocio Sanchez, Mario-Rosa Bayan) & Los Hijos Del Sol (Marco Huertas Sr., David Huertas, Perdo Sanchez, Carlos Sanchez)
