= La Fiesta =

La Fiesta may refer to:

- La Fiesta (supermarket), an American store chain in Greater San Antonio, Texas, operated by Foodarama
- La Fiesta Mall, a defunct shopping center in San Roque, Northern Mariana Island
- La Fiesta (film), a 1988 Paraguayan short film
- "La Fiesta", a jazz composition by Chick Corea from Return to Forever
- "La Fiesta", a 2014 song by Diana Haddad

== See also ==
- "A la fiesta", a 2000 song by Miranda
- Fiesta (disambiguation)
