= List of number-one hits of 1998 (Germany) =

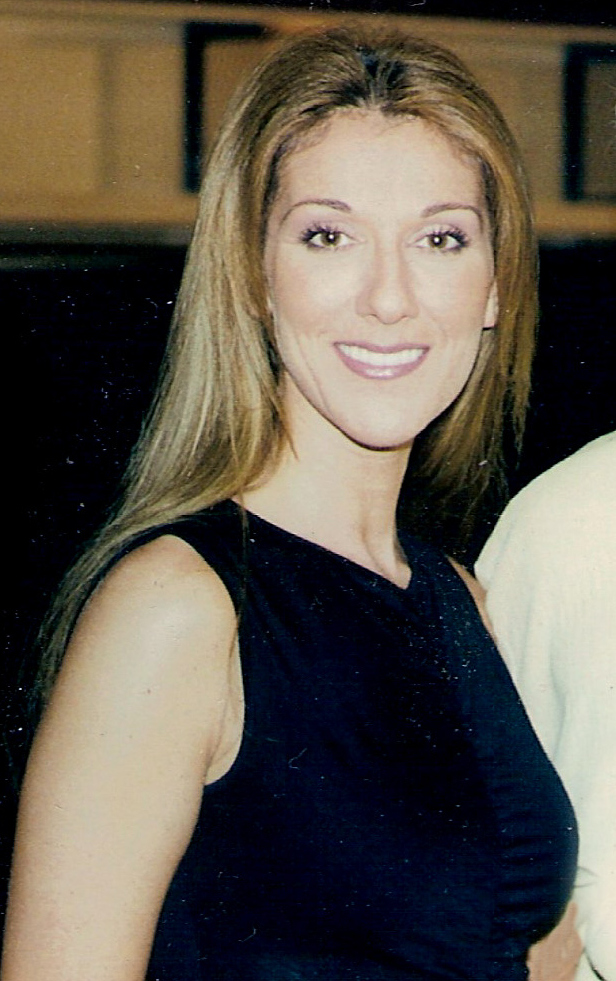
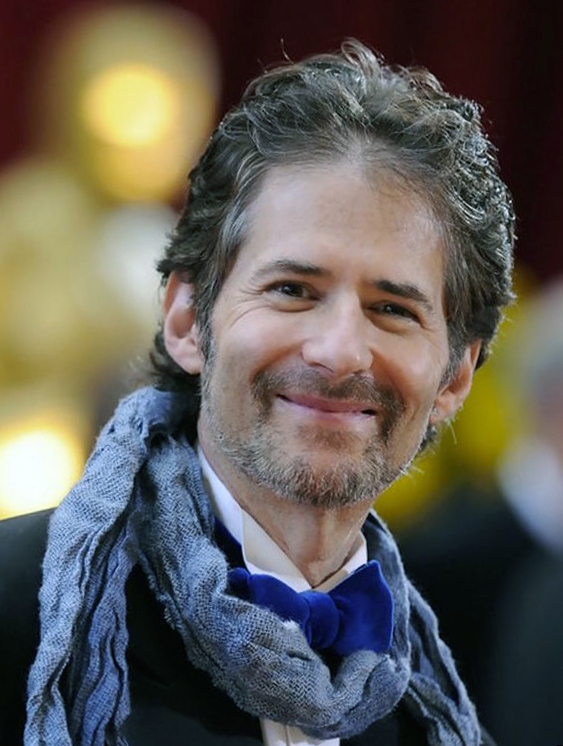
Celine Dion's "My Heart Will Go On" became the best-performing single of 1998, while soundtrack album of the movie Titanic by James Horner became the best-performing album of the year.

This is a list of the German Media Control Top100 Singles Chart number-ones of 1998.

== Number-one hits by week ==
Key
†	Indicates best-performing single and album of 1998

Issue date	Song	Artist	Ref.	Album	Artist	Ref.
5 January	"It's Like That"	Run-D.M.C. vs. Jason Nevins		Let's Talk About Love	Celine Dion	
12 January	"It's Like That"	Run-D.M.C. vs. Jason Nevins		Let's Talk About Love	Celine Dion	
19 January	"It's Like That"	Run-D.M.C. vs. Jason Nevins		Let's Talk About Love	Celine Dion	
26 January	"It's Like That"	Run-D.M.C. vs. Jason Nevins		Let's Talk About Love	Celine Dion	
2 February	"My Heart Will Go On" †	Céline Dion		Mächtig viel Theater	Pur	
9 February	"My Heart Will Go On" †	Céline Dion		Mächtig viel Theater	Pur	
16 February	"My Heart Will Go On" †	Céline Dion		Titanic: Music from the Motion Picture †	James Horner	
23 February	"My Heart Will Go On" †	Céline Dion		Titanic: Music from the Motion Picture †	James Horner	
2 March	"My Heart Will Go On" †	Céline Dion		Titanic: Music from the Motion Picture †	James Horner	
9 March	"My Heart Will Go On" †	Céline Dion		Titanic: Music from the Motion Picture †	James Horner	
16 March	"My Heart Will Go On" †	Céline Dion		Ray of Light	Madonna	
23 March	"My Heart Will Go On" †	Céline Dion		Ray of Light	Madonna	
30 March	"My Heart Will Go On" †	Céline Dion		Ray of Light	Madonna	
6 April	"My Heart Will Go On" †	Céline Dion		Ray of Light	Madonna	
13 April	"My Heart Will Go On" †	Céline Dion		Back for Good	Modern Talking	
20 April	"My Heart Will Go On" †	Céline Dion		Back for Good	Modern Talking	
27 April	"My Heart Will Go On" †	Céline Dion		Back for Good	Modern Talking	
4 May	"Männer sind Schweine"	Die Ärzte		Bleibt alles anders	Herbert Grönemeyer	
11 May	"Männer sind Schweine"	Die Ärzte		Bleibt alles anders	Herbert Grönemeyer	
18 May	"Männer sind Schweine"	Die Ärzte		Back for Good	Modern Talking	
25 May	"Männer sind Schweine"	Die Ärzte		Back for Good	Modern Talking	
1 June	"Männer sind Schweine"	Die Ärzte		Blue	Simply Red	
8 June	"Männer sind Schweine"	Die Ärzte		13	Die Ärzte	
15 June	"Männer sind Schweine"	Die Ärzte		13	Die Ärzte	
22 June	"Männer sind Schweine"	Die Ärzte		13	Die Ärzte	
29 June	"The Cup of Life / La Copa de la Vida"	Ricky Martin		13	Die Ärzte	
6 July	"The Cup of Life / La Copa de la Vida"	Ricky Martin		13	Die Ärzte	
13 July	"The Cup of Life / La Copa de la Vida"	Ricky Martin		13	Die Ärzte	
20 July	"The Cup of Life / La Copa de la Vida"	Ricky Martin		Hello Nasty	Beastie Boys	
27 July	"Ghetto Supastar (That Is What You Are)"	Pras featuring Ol' Dirty Bastard and Mýa		Hello Nasty	Beastie Boys	
3 August	"Bailando"	Loona		Hello Nasty	Beastie Boys	
10 August	"Bailando"	Loona		City of Angels	Soundtrack	
17 August	"Bailando"	Loona		City of Angels	Soundtrack	
24 August	"Bailando"	Loona		City of Angels	Soundtrack	
31 August	"Bailando"	Loona		Radio Maria	Westernhagen	
7 September	"Bailando"	Loona		Radio Maria	Westernhagen	
14 September	"I Don't Want to Miss a Thing"	Aerosmith		Radio Maria	Westernhagen	
21 September	"I Don't Want to Miss a Thing"	Aerosmith		Viva loz tioz	Böhse Onkelz	
28 September	"I Don't Want to Miss a Thing"	Aerosmith		Radio Maria	Westernhagen	
5 October	"I Don't Want to Miss a Thing"	Aerosmith		Radio Maria	Westernhagen	
12 October	"Flugzeuge im Bauch"	Oli.P		The Singles 86–98	Depeche Mode	
19 October	"Flugzeuge im Bauch"	Oli.P		Einfach geilǃ	Wolfgang Petry	
26 October	"Flugzeuge im Bauch"	Oli.P		Einfach geilǃ	Wolfgang Petry	
2 November	"Flugzeuge im Bauch"	Oli.P		Einfach geilǃ	Wolfgang Petry	
9 November	"Flugzeuge im Bauch"	Oli.P		Up	R.E.M.	
16 November	"Flugzeuge im Bauch"	Oli.P		Supposed Former Infatuation Junkie	Alanis Morissette	
23 November	"Flugzeuge im Bauch"	Oli.P		The Best of 1980–1990	U2	
30 November	"Believe"	Cher		The Best of 1980–1990	U2	
7 December	"Believe"	Cher		Garage Inc.	Metallica	
14 December	"Believe"	Cher		The Best of 1980–1990	U2	
21 December	"Believe"	Cher		Radio Maria	Westernhagen	
28 December	"Hijo de la Luna"	Loona		Radio Maria	Westernhagen	

== See also ==
- List of number-one hits (Germany)
- List of German airplay number-one songs
