= Jack the Lad (disambiguation) =

Jack the Lad were a British folk rock group from North East England formed in 1973.

Jack the Lad may also refer to:

== In music ==
- The Sailor's Hornpipe, also known as The College Hornpipe and Jack's the Lad, a traditional hornpipe melody
- JLS, an English boy band whose name stands for "Jack the Lad Swing"
- "Jack the Lad", B-side of the Pet Shop Boys 1986 single "Suburbia", also included on the 1986 album Please
- "Jack the Lad", a 1988 song by 3 Man Island
- "Jack the Lad", the ballad of a London teenager's death by overdose, written by John Pole and recorded by Frankie Armstrong on her 1975 album Songs and Ballads.

== As a nickname ==
- Jack the Lad, the childhood nickname of the English actor Jack O'Connell
- "Gentleman Jack" or "Jack the Lad", nickname of Jack Sheppard (1702–1724), a notorious English thief and gaol-breaker of early 18th-century London

== Other uses ==
- "Jack the Lad", a poem by Irish poet Robert Fallon describing Sticky Vicky's stage show

== See also ==
- Jack (magazine), a British lad magazine
