= Eden Roc Miami Beach Hotel =

Resort hotel in Miami Beach, Florida

Coordinates: 25°49′10.47″N 80°07′20.34″W

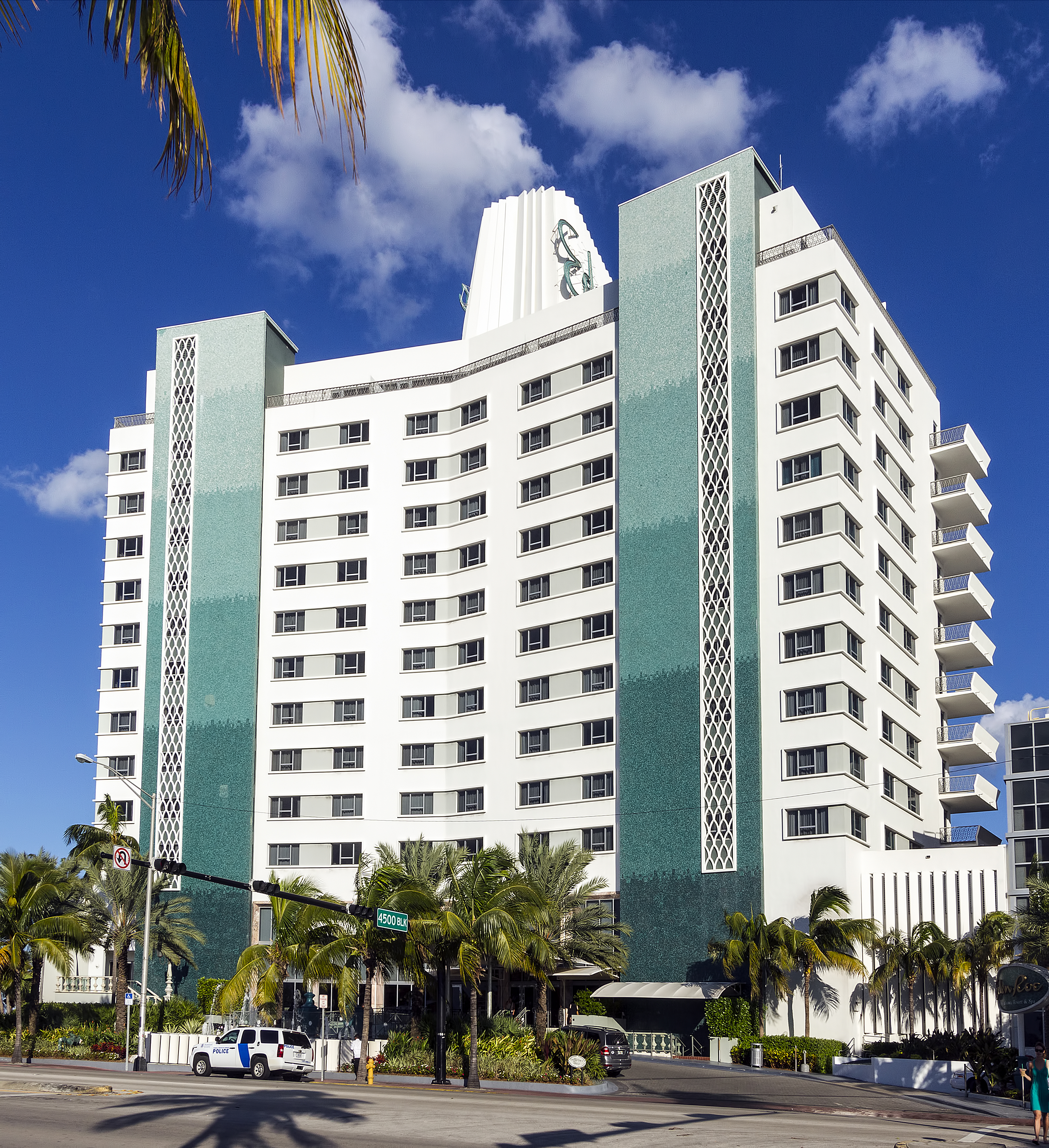
Eden Roc Miami Beach

The Eden Roc Miami Beach is a resort hotel at 4525 Collins Avenue in Miami Beach, Florida. The building contains the Nobu Hotel Miami Beach. It was designed by Morris Lapidus in the Miami Modern style, and was completed in 1955–56. Renovated in 2008, the hotel has 621 guest rooms, including 96 suites. It was built on the site of the Warner Estate following litigation over development rights to the site and to the neighboring Firestone Estate, which became the Fontainebleau Hotel.

== Design ==
Morris Lapidus designed the Eden Roc for a site immediately to the north of his Fontainebleau Miami Beach hotel built in 1954. The hotel was designed for Harry Mufson, who was a then-estranged former business partner of Fontainebleau owner, Ben Novack, who together had previously created another Miami Beach landmark hotel (the design of which Lapidus did not initiate, grant completed) located about a half-mile to the south, the Sans Souci (which opened in 1949). The Eden Roc site had previously been the Warner Estate, owned by Albert Warner of the Warner Brothers. Mufson told Lapidus "I don't want any of the French stuff you used at the Fontainebleau. That's for kids." Novack was infuriated at both Lapidus and Mufson for building the Eden Roc, then considered one of the most elegant and luxurious hotels of its time, and retaliated in 1961 by building a blank 14-story North Tower as a "spite wall" on the Fontainebleau property to shade the Eden Roc's pool. All rooms faced south, and the side facing the Eden Roc consisted of an unpainted and unsightly "eye sore," in which the sole window, an oceanside penthouse on the north side, belonged to Novack, which he created for the purpose of "keeping an eye on" Harry and his guests at the Eden Roc. Mufson sued Novack in what would become one of the most acrimonious, personal legal architectural battles in Miami Beach history.

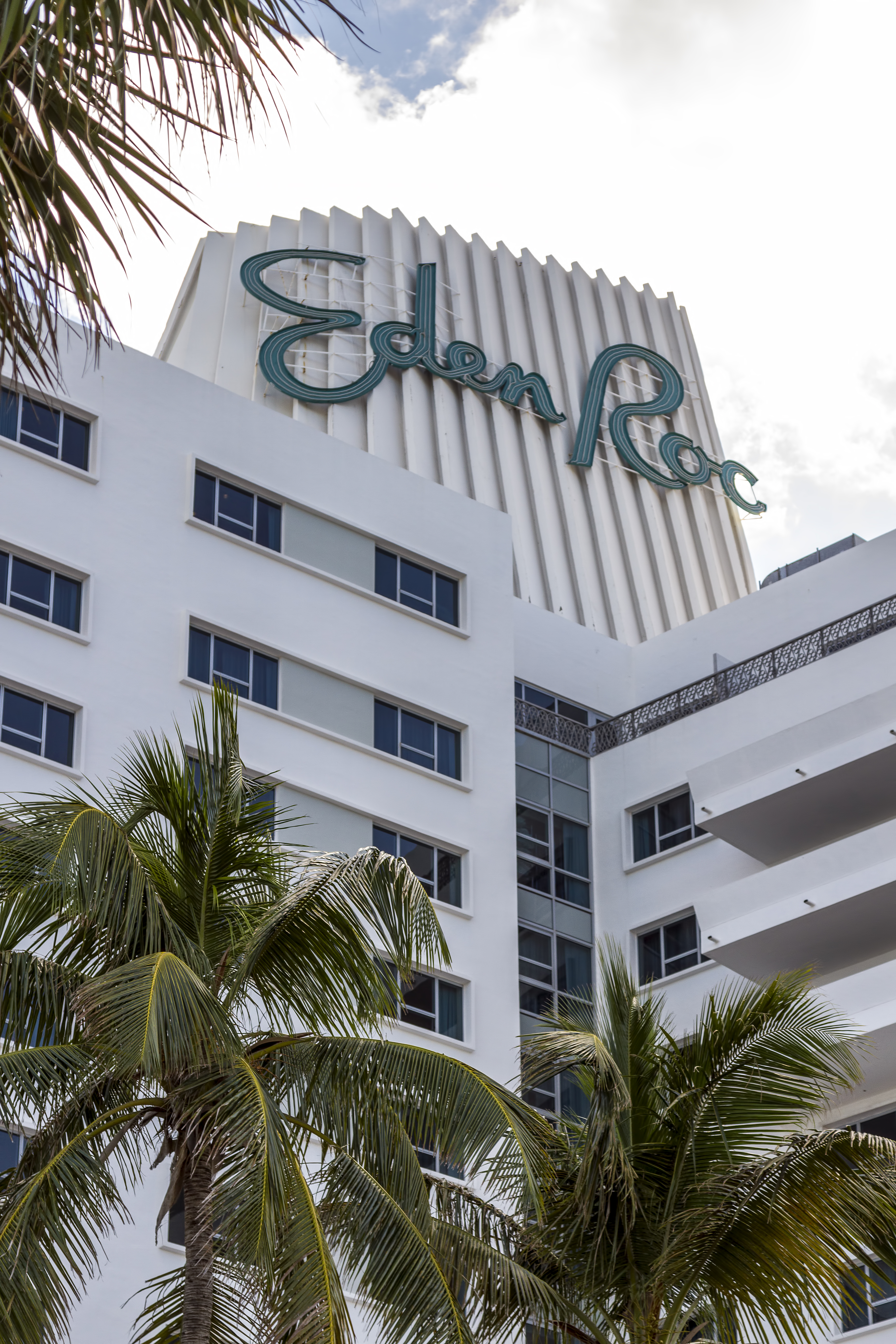
Hotel crest and sign

At the Eden Roc, Lapidus avoided the sweeping curves of the Fontainebleau, choosing instead a more formal composition reminiscent of earlier Miami Beach hotels. The hotel is surmounted by a large finned enclosure bearing the hotel's signs. An addition on the south side of the Eden Roc property was built to cover the spite wall and new pools were built in unshaded locations.

The hotel was named after the Eden Roc pavilion at the Hotel du Cap-Eden-Roc in Antibes, France. The hotel housed the Cafe Pompei, a supper club that offered entertainment with dinner. The Mona Lisa Room was an intimate formal dining room, and Harry's American Bar was the hotel's nightclub (not named after the hotel owner, Harry Mufson, but rather a famous bar – considered by many an institution – in Venice, Italy, and a name Morris Lapidus borrowed for the storied nightclub within the Eden Roc).

== Lawsuits ==
In 1959 the Eden Roc as Forty-Five Twenty-Five Inc. sued the neighbouring Fontainebleau Hotel in Fontainebleau Hotel Corporation v Forty-Five Twenty-Five, Inc. At issue was the development of an addition to the Fontainebleau which would block out the sunlight from the Eden Roc's cabana and pool area after 2PM, which Eden Roc claimed was motivated by malice on the part of the Fontainebleau. Eden Roc ultimately lost. This case set a precedent in the United States that property rights do not include unimpeded access to the flow of air and sunlight from a neighbouring property.

== Recent history ==
The hotel was restored in 1997 by architects Spillis Candela and Partners. In 2005, Marriott International began operating the hotel under its Renaissance Hotels & Resorts brand as the Eden Roc Renaissance Miami Beach, after performing a 200$ Million 18-month renovation and expansion led by Nichols Architects. Completed in 2008, the expansion created the new 21-story Ocean Tower, and was awarded for the historic preservation of the hotel.

Due to disagreements between Marriott and the owners, which resulted in numerous lawsuits, the fifty-year contract was cut short, and the hotel left Marriott on July 11, 2013.

In 2016, a portion of the hotel, including 206 guest rooms and the hotel's bar and restaurants, was converted to the Nobu Hotel Miami Beach, a "hotel-within-a-hotel". The Eden Roc now has 415 remaining rooms.

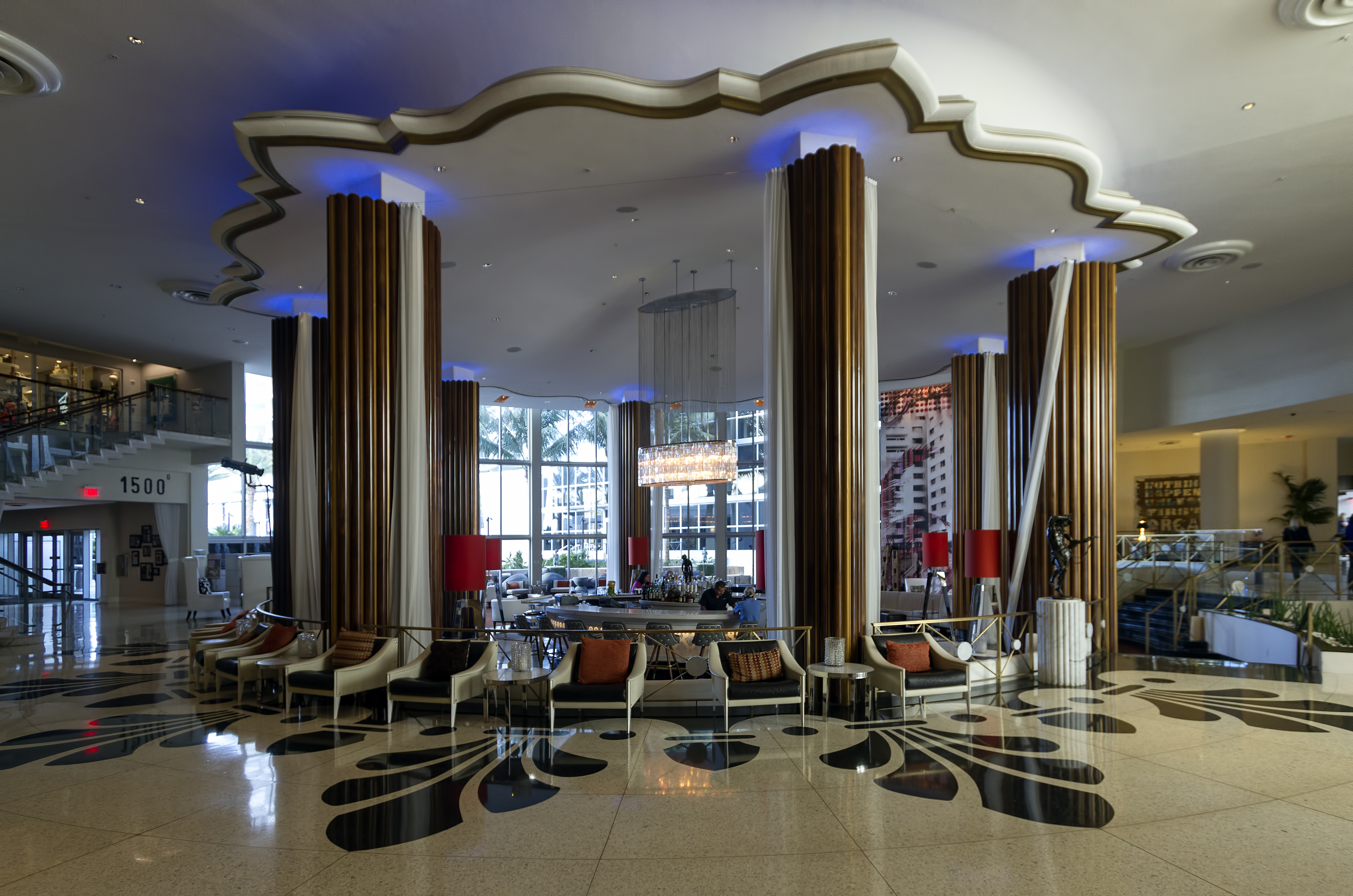
The lobby, before its conversion in 2016 to Bar Nobu

== In popular culture ==
The musical group Steely Dan mentions "a tower room at Eden Roc" as a symbol of luxury in its song "Brooklyn (Owes the Charmer Under Me)," on the album Can't Buy a Thrill (1972).

Eden Roc was also featured in back to back episodes of I Love Lucy, entitled "Deep Sea Fishing" and "Desert Island" in 1956.

The hotel was also a shooting location for the music video to "Bailando" by Belgian eurodance band Paradisio, with the iconic crest being seen multiple time throughout the video.

The hotel is shown in an establishing shot for the movie Chef (2014).
