= Lunita =

Studio album by Loona
- Released: January 1999
- Recorded: 1998–1999
- Genre: Pop music
- Label: Urban Records 559 907-2
- Producer: DJ Sammy

Loona chronology
| Lunita (1999) | Entre Dos Aguas (2000) |

Singles from Lunita
- 1. "Bailando" Released: May 1998; 2. "Hijo De La Luna" Released: November 1998; 3. "Dónde Vas" Released: March 1999

Lunita (a portmanteau of Spanish words; luna and bonita which means moon and beautiful) is the debut album by Dutch recording artist Loona and produced by DJ Sammy. It was released in 1999 via Urban Records. The album includes the three singles "Dancing (Bailando)", Son of the Moon (Hijo De La Luna) and "Where You Go (Dónde Vas)".

== Background ==
When Marie-José van der Kolk adopted the stage name "Carisma", she performed as a featured artist on a string of DJ Sammy's single releases, such as "Life is Just a Game", "Prince of Love","Golden Child", "Magic Moment" and "You Are My Angel" as well as on DJ Sammy's debut studio album Life Is Just A Game, which heavily involved van der Kolk on vocals. In the Summer of 1998. Samuel Bouriah came up with a new project called Loona, leaned on the Spanish word "luna" for "moon", to serve as a more solo project for van der Kolk, instead of the continuation of "DJ Sammy feat. Carisma". Sometimes presented and promoted as a Duo, Bouriah stayed in the background for music videos and cover arts and kept producing Loona. The first single, which also appeared as a bonus track on Life is Just a Game, was the song "Bailando". By Autumn, it was followed by the second single "Hijo De La Luna". van der Kolk and Bouriah decided to release a full Loona studio album.

== Content ==
Lunita provides a variety of genres, comprising ambient sounds, such as in the "Intro", with catchy, good mood, summervibe tunes such as "Bailando" and "Oye, Oye" with easy beats, sounds, melodies and simple lyrics. Other genres includes ballads recorded with classical and orchestral elements like "Hijo de la Luna", "Mamá" and "Maripossa" at the beginning of the album and the bonus track "Porqué". "Dónde Vas" and "Amor, Amor" are Flamenco guitar driven uptempo pop songs with a summervibe feeling. The song themes features positive things, love and good moods. The lyrics on the album are completely performed in Spanish, except "Another Christmas Without You", the only song with an English title and only Christmas song, and "Dónde Vas", both partly sung in English, and the "Intro" and "Outro", which features Spanish and English spoken-word bits by van der Kolk, Bouriah, their family and their friends. The album features the "Radio Remix" of "Hijo De La Luna", which is also known as the "Antonio Catania Remix".

== Commercial performance ==
The album peaked at #1 at the German Album chart. It also peaked at #8 and #7 at the Austrian and Swiss Album Chart, making it the most successful Loona album to date. The first single "Bailando" became the summer song of 1998 in Germany, reaching the top of the German charts and Echo-awarded as "Best Dance Single". The second single "Hijo De La Luna", a cover of the Spanish band Mecano, which also reached number 1 on the German charts. These two singles became gold- and platinum selling records in Germany, Austria and Switzerland. "Dónde Vas" was released as the third and final single in 1999, becoming a moderate success peaking at #26 and #40 at the German and Swiss Single Chart respectively.

== Singles ==
- "Bailando" was released as the first single from the album. It was a cover of Paradisio's hit Bailando, and it became the summer song of 1998 in Germany, awarding her an Echo award.
- "Hijo De La Luna" was the next release to be the second single from the album. The song (cover of the Spanish band Mecano), with the newly formed Orchestra De La Luna, also reached #1 in German charts and was chosen as RTL's Christmas song.
- "Dónde Vas" was released as the third and final single in 1999.

== Track listing ==
| No. | Title | Writer(s) | Producer(s) | Length |
|---|---|---|---|---|
| 1. | "Intro" (feat. DJ Sammy) | Marie-José van der Kolk; Samuel Bouriah | DJ Sammy | 0:57 |
| 2. | "Hijo De La Luna" | José Andrés | Sammy | 4:11 |
| 3. | "Mamá" | van der Kolk; Bouriah | Sammy | 4:13 |
| 4. | "Maripossa" | van der Kolk; Bouriah | Sammy | 3:46 |
| 5. | "Another Christmas Without You" | van der Kolk; Bouriah | Sammy | 4:17 |
| 6. | "Dónde Vas" | van der Kolk; Bouriah; Henning Reith | Sammy | 4:02 |
| 7. | "Amor, Amor" (feat. DJ Sammy) | van der Kolk; Bouriah | Sammy | 5:00 |
| 8. | "Hijo De La Luna" (Antonio Catania Remix) | José Andrés | Sammy | 3:55 |
| 9. | "Bailando" | Luc Rigaux; Patrick Samoy; Garcia Asensio | Sammy; Reith; Unity Mixers | 3:36 |
| 10. | "Oye, Oye" | van der Kolk; Bouriah | Sammy; Reith; Unity Mixers | 4:04 |
| 11. | "Outro" | van der Kolk; Bouriah | Sammy | 2:27 |
| Total length: | | | | 40:13 |

Bonus track
| No. | Title | Writer(s) | Producer(s) | Length |
|---|---|---|---|---|
| 12. | "Porqué" (feat. DJ Sammy) | van der Kolk; Bouriah | Sammy | 3:11 |
| Total length: | | | | 43:24 |

Notes

- "Hijo De La Luna (Antonio Catania Remix)" is also known as "Hijo De La Luna (Radio Remix)"

Sample credits

- "Bailando" contains elements from the composition "Don't Go" by Yazoo, written by Vincent Martin.

== Charts ==
| Chart (1999) | Peak position |
|---|---|
| Austrian Albums (Ö3 Austria) | 8 |
| German Albums (Offizielle Top 100) | 13 |
| Swiss Albums (Schweizer Hitparade) | 7 |
