= Age of Love (album) =

Studio album by Scooter
- Released: 25 August 1997
- Recorded: 1997
- Studios: Loop Dance Constructions Studios, Hamburg, Germany
- Length: 45:23
- Labels: Club Tools; Loop Dance Constructions
- Producers: H.P. Baxxter; Rick J. Jordan; Ferris Bueller; Jens Thele

Scooter chronology
Wicked! (1996)	Age of Love (1997)	Rough and Tough and Dangerous – The Singles 94/98 (1998)

Singles from Age of Love
- 1. "Fire" Released: 1 April 1997; 2. "The Age of Love" Released: 11 August 1997

Professional ratings
Review scores
Source	Rating
Allmusic	2/5 stars

Age of Love is the fourth studio album by German band Scooter, released in 1997. Age of Love was released containing two singles, "Fire" and "The Age of Love". It is the last studio album featuring Ferris Bueller, who left the band in 1998 to pursue a solo career. "Fire" appears on the Mortal Kombat Annihilation Soundtrack. "Fire" received Gold in Germany for selling 250,000 copies.

The album was re-released on LP on 17 September 2021, which was available on black and white LP, with the white coloured vinyl being limited to 500 copies.

== Track listing ==
All tracks are written by H.P. Baxxter, Rick J. Jordan, Ferris Bueller, and Jens Thele; except "Forever (Keep Me Running)", "Hit the Drum", and "Tonight" co-written by Shahin Moshirian and Stephan Browarczyk; "Leave in Silence" co-written by Nosie Katzmann.

No.	Title	Length
1.	"Introduction"	1:00
2.	"The Age of Love"	3:48
3.	"She Said"	5:18
4.	"Fire"	3:32
5.	"Dancing in the Moonlight"	4:33
6.	"Forever (Keep Me Running)"	4:46
7.	"Hit the Drum"	4:37
8.	"Don't Waste No Time"	4:14
9.	"Tonight"	4:58
10.	"Return of the Future"	4:57
11.	"Leave in Silence"	3:34

== Charts ==
Chart performance for Age of Love
Chart (1997)	Peak position
Austrian Albums (Ö3 Austria)	32
Finnish Albums (Suomen virallinen lista)	4
German Albums (Offizielle Top 100)	19
Hungarian Albums (MAHASZ)	3
Norwegian Albums (VG-lista)	35
Swedish Albums (Sverigetopplistan)	26
Swiss Albums (Schweizer Hitparade)	35

== Certifications ==
Certifications for Age of Love
Region	Certification	Certified units/sales
Finland (Musiikkituottajat)	Gold	31,664
