= Paradisio (album) =

Studio album by Paradisio
- Released: 1997
- Recorded: 1995–1997
- Genre: Latin, Eurohouse
- Length: 68:00
- Label: Arcade Music Company/Nippon Crown
- Producer: The Unity Mixers

Singles from Paradisio
- 1. "Bailando" Released: 19 May 1996; 2. "Bandolero" Released: 22 September 1996; 3. "Vamos a la Discoteca" Released: 23 May 1997; 4. "Dime Como" Released: October 1997; 5. "Paseo" Released: June 1998

Paradisio, also titled Tarpeia, is the debut album by Belgian group Paradisio, it was released in 1997 in most countries across Europe. It peaked at number 18 in Finland and number 54 in Sweden. The album released five singles. In 1998 the album was released in Russia and Japan with a different cover.

== Singles ==
"Bailando" was released in 1996 as the lead single. The song reached number-one in Italy, Denmark, Norway, Finland and Sweden. It peaked at number two in Belgium. It sold more than 550,000 copies in France and reached number four. In Sweden, it was the best selling single by being triple platinum. The song was a hit in most countries across Europe during the summer of 1997. The song was popular in Mexico. The single has two music videos.

"Bandolero" was originally released in October 1995 in Belgium as the 1st single. It reached the top 20 in Belgium and was re-released in March 1998 in the rest of Europe, where it reached number 11 in Italy and number 92 in France. It has a music video.

"Vamos a la Discoteca" was released in May 1997 as the third single. It reached the top 10 in Finland, Italy, Norway, and Sweden, and reached the top 20 in Belgium and France. The music video was filmed on Harbour Island in the Bahamas.

"Dime Como" was released in October 1997 as the fourth single. It reached number 36 in Sweden. It has a music video.

"Paseo" was released in June 1998 as the fifth single. It reached number 51 in Sweden. It has a music video.

== Track listing ==
| No. | Title | Length |
|---|---|---|
| 1. | "Bailando" | 3:50 |
| 2. | "Planeta de Amor" | 5:50 |
| 3. | "Dime Como" | 4:10 |
| 4. | "Bandolero" | 3:56 |
| 5. | "Sentimental" | 4:44 |
| 6. | "Never Again" | 3:55 |
| 7. | "Get Up Baby" | 4:13 |
| 8. | "Vamos a la Discoteca" | 3:55 |
| 9. | "Paseo" | 3:26 |
| 10. | "No No No Llores No" | 4:01 |
| 11. | "Bailando" (2 Fabiola Ibiza Remix) | 5:02 |
| 12. | "Vamos a la Discoteca" (Holiday Party Remix) | 6:03 |
| 13. | "Bandolero" (U.S. Power Club Remix) | 7:45 |
| 14. | "Bailando" (Discoteca Remix) | 6:52 |

== Charts and sales ==
=== Album ===
| Title | Details | Peak chart positions | |
| Title | Details | FIN | SWE |
|---|---|---|---|
| "Paradisio" | Release date: 1997; Label: Arcade Music Company; Formats: CD | 18 | 54 |

== Certifications ==
| Region | Certification | Certified units/sales |
|---|---|---|
| Finland (Musiikkituottajat) | Gold | 37,705 |
