= Moonrise (Loona album) =

Studio album by Loona
- Released: October 10, 2008
- Recorded: 2008
- Genre: Pop music
- Length: 79:25 Min.
- Label: Sony BMG, Ariola

Loona chronology
'Everybody On The Floor' (2007)	Moonrise (2008)

Singles from Moonrise
- 1. "Por La Noche" Released: 2008; 2. "Salam Aleikoum" Released: 2008

Moonrise is the seventh studio album by Dutch singer Loona.

== Track listing ==
Adapted from Germany CD release.

1. "Angel" – 3:49
2. "Salam Aleikoum" – 2:56
3. "Shining Star (Gipsy Circus)" – 3:35
4. "Por La Noche" – 2:58
5. "Et Me Voila" – 3:18
6. "Eternally" – 4:18
7. "In The Sound Of Silence" – 4:24
8. "No One Loves You (Like I Do)" – 4:40
9. "Love (One on one)" – 3:53
10. "Hot Stuff" – 3:20 (cover of Donna Summer song)
11. "Na Na Na" – 3:21
12. "Sube El Calor - 3:23
13. "Isla Del Sol" - 3:22
14. "Va Saliendo La Luna" - 3:51
15. "Gib Mir Deine Angst" - 4:15 (cover of Udo Jürgens song)
16. "Hijo De La Luna 2008" - 5:43
17. "Prince Of Love 2008" - 3:56
18. "Bailando 2008" - 3:26
19. "Mamboleo 2008" - 3:40
20. "Rhythm Of The Night 2008" - 3:45
21. "Por La Noche" - 3:33 (Canis Club Mix)
