= Loona (singer) =

Dutch pop singer

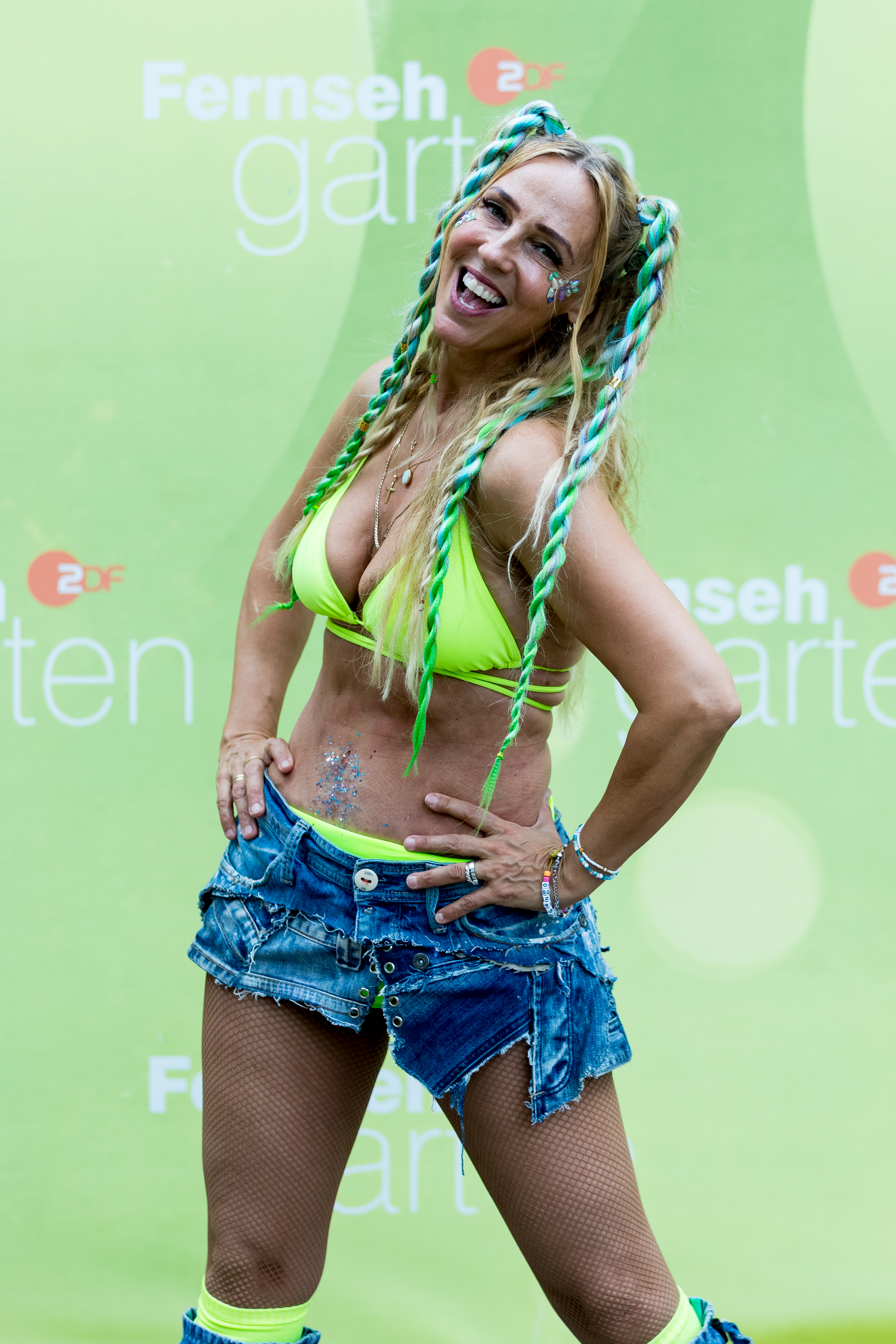
- Loona in 2025.

Background information
- Also known as: Carisma
- Born: Marie-José van der Kolk; 16 September 1974 (age 51); IJmuiden, Netherlands
- Genres: Dance; pop; Latin pop; Europop
- Occupations: Singer; songwriter; dancer
- Years active: 1994–present
- Label: Moonlight Music BV
- Website: loona.com

Loona (born Marie-José van der Kolk, on 16 September 1974) is a Dutch pop singer and dancer.

== Life and career ==
=== 1994–1998: Beginnings and Life Is Just a Game ===
In 1991, Van der Kolk met DJ and producer DJ Sammy at Zorba's Club in El Arenal Mallorca. In 1992, DJ Sammy became resident DJ at the Joy Palace Club in El Arenal, while Van der Kolk was a resident dancer there, for whom she started to be a background singer for live performances. She adopted the stage name "Carisma" and performed as a featured artist on DJ Sammy's music. In 1996, they released their first singles "Life is Just a Game" and "You Are My Angel", which was their first hit. In 1997, with the release of their third single "Prince of Love", they scored a Top 30 hit in Germany, followed by the singles "Golden Child" and "Magic Moment". DJ Sammy's debut studio album Life Is Just a Game, which featured van der Kolk on vocals, peaked at number 62 in the German album chart. In the Summer of 1998, van der Kolk came up with a new project called Loona (leaned on the Spanish word "luna" for "moon"), also produced by DJ Sammy. Originally started as a Duo, DJ Sammy stayed in the background for music videos and cover arts. The first single, which also appeared as a bonus track on Life is Just a Game, was a cover of Paradisio's song "Bailando" and it became the summer song of 1998 in Germany, reaching the number 1 of the German charts 8 weeks long and Echo-awarded as "Best International Dance Single". By Autumn, it was followed by another single "Hijo de la Luna" (a cover of the Spanish band Mecano) which also reached number 1 on the German charts. These two singles sold millions and became gold- and platinum selling records in Germany, Austria and Switzerland.

=== 1999–2000: Lunita and Entre dos Aguas ===
In 1999, Loona's first studio album titled Lunita was released, followed by the third and final single from this album, the Top 30 hit "Dónde Vas". Afterwards, the song "Mamboleo", a cover version of Herbert Grönemeyer's song "Mambo", was released from the second album Entre dos Aguas reaching number 5 in German single chart. It was Echo-awarded as "Best Dance Single" in 1999. Due to a lawsuit set up by Herbert Grönemeyer for infringement, a second black and white music video was shot, and finally both videos were banned from music stations and only played for just one day of airing. The song itself then had to be removed from Entre dos Aguas, the re-issued versions of the album do not include the track and only can be found on rare and early pressings. Still the song re-appeared and included on Loona's first compilation album Greatest Hits later in 2000. Entre dos Aguas saw three more single releases "Salvador Dalí", another cover of the Spanish band Mecano, "La Vida es una Flor" and the Christmas single "Navidad", becoming minor hits which did not reach the Top 50 in Germany. In 2000, Loona's first compilation album Greatest Hits and its first single, "Latino Lover" (a Spanish remake of "You're the Greatest Lover" by the pop band Luv'), was released and peaked at number 6 in German and Swiss single chart. In 1999, van der Kolk again provided guest vocals as Carisma for DJ Sammy's single "In 2 Eternity" from his first remix album DJ Sammy at Work (In the Mix).

=== 2001–2002: Baila mi Ritmo and Colors ===
In 2001, Loona released the singles "Baila mi Ritmo" and "Viva el Amor" followed by her second compilation album Baila mi Ritmo. "Viva el Amor" became a number 1 hit in Spain. In 2002, she released the singles "Rhythm of the Night" and "Colors" from the third studio album Colors. For this album, Loona experimented with a more mature and oriental sound, which can be heard on songs like "Land of broken dreams", "If you want my love" or on the third single release and a number 4 song "Rhythm of the Night", a remake of "Hadi Bakalim" from Sezen Aksu's 1991 album Gülümse. In 2002, van der Kolk continued providing guest vocals for DJ Sammy's singles "Sunlight" and the Don Henley cover version "The Boys of Summer" from his second studio album Heaven, but this time for the first time credited as "DJ Sammy feat. Loona" both reaching number 1 in several countries in the world.

=== 2003–2005: Wind of Time, hiatus and motherhood ===
In 2004, Loona was featured on DJ Sammy's single "Rise Again" and released her first and only single, the Eric Clapton classic "Tears In Heaven", of her fourth studio album Wind of Time, followed in 2005. Both singles became moderate hits. The album is a collection full of cover versions. According to van der Kolk, she dedicated the album title, selected track list and the entire album to her mother, whom she lost ten years ago. It features covers such as Procol Harum's "A Whiter Shade of Pale", Peter Sarstedt's "Where Do You Go to My Lovely", Ralph McTell's "Streets Of London", Sting's "Fragile" or Bob Dylan's "Blowin' In The Wind". She emotionally performed "Tears In Heaven" at "The Dome" crying and pregnant with her first child. Her daughter named Saphira Maria was welcomed in 2005. In 2005, Loona released the David Bisbal classic "Oye el Boom" and went on hiatus for her baby.

=== 2007–2008: Everybody on the Floor and Moonrise ===
In 2007, Loona's third compilation album Everybody on the Floor and the same titled single, a reggaeton song titled "Everybody on the Floor (Uh la la la)" have been released. In May 2008, Loona signed a new contract with Sony BMG/Ariola and returned with her fifth studio album "Moonrise" in October, preceded by its two single releases "Por la Noche" and "Salam Aleikoum", all with limited success. Professionally and in private, van der Kolk parted ways with her longtime collaborator and father of her daughter, DJ Sammy. She was also a Judge in the seventh season of the German version of "Popstars" alongside rapper Sido and choreographer Detlef Soost.

=== 2009–2013: Vamos a la Playa and collaborations ===
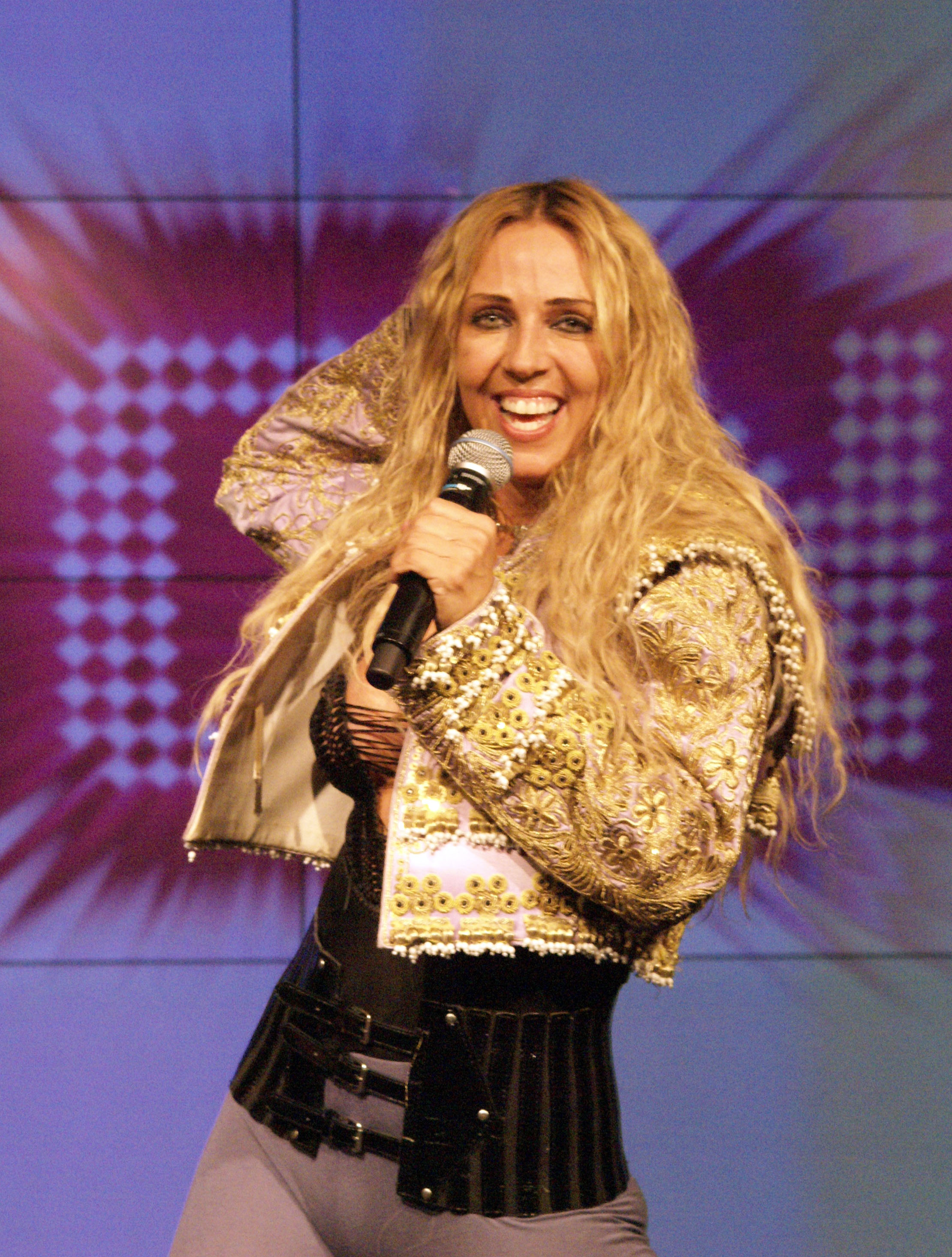
Loona performing in 2009

In 2009, Loona returned with the cover version of Cidinho & Doca, "Parapapapapa" to her summer tune roots since "Viva el Amor" in 2001. The single peaked number 29 in the German single chart. Van der Kolk attended the VOX television program Das perfekte Promidinner im Schlafrock. In 2010, the single "Vamos a la playa", a Miranda cover, she landed another summer hit, charted at number 2 in Belgium, and "El Cucaracho, El Muchacho", a collaboration with Movetown, followed. "Vamos a la playa" also reached number 3 in France, number 1 in Haïti, number 5 in South-Africa, number 16 in Switzerland, number 22 in Denmark, and number 29 in Germany. With over 100 Million views in YouTube her greatest hit worldwide. In July 2011, the single and Pigbag classic "El Tiburón" charted at number 31 in the German single chart. Again in 2012, van der Kolk attended the VOX television program "Das perfekte Promidinner im Schlafrock" and the ProSieben program "TV Total Wok WM". In June 2012, Loona posed nude for the German edition of Playboy. Until 2013, Loona released four further songs, the singles "Policia", "Oh la la, dance avec moi", the Los Diablos cover version "Rakatakata (Un Rayo de Sol)". All these singles to be included on her long-awaited, sixth studio album with the working title Summer Dance, later retitled Rakatakata (Un Rayo de Sol). Loona appeared as guest vocalist on DJ Cassey Doreen's single "Tell it to my Heart", a Taylor Dayne cover version.

=== 2014–2015: Brazil and singles ===
In 2014, the single "Brazil", a cover of Francisco Alves's "Aquarela do Brasil", was released for the FIFA World Cup in Brazil. Loona was also guest vocalist on Flava & Stevenson's 2k14 remix of their single "Rio de Janeiro", found on their album Quantum of Dance, which both latter mentioned songs appeared on her first extended play titled Brazil. In 2014, Loona released the single "Ademloos door de Nacht", a Dutch-language cover version of German singer Helene Fischer's single "Atemlos durch die Nacht" and first release under her real name Marie-José van der Kolk, from her upcoming studio album. In mid 2015, Loona re-released her single "Caliente" in a remixed version, and the German language single "OMG! Dein Body ist so Heiß" alongside Ko&Ko, formally Gebroeders Ko.

=== 2016–2017: Badam ===
In 2016, Loona released her single "Badam", a cover version of Lylloo & Lorinda, as a lead single from her eponymous titled seventh studio album. Later that year followed by a new single "On Va Dancer", which was sung in French.

=== 2017–2019: Summer of Love and singles ===
In 2017 Loona released "Summer of Love", written by herself. A year later in 2018, Loona presented a remake of "Bailando" with DJ Combo and "Turn the Tide" with Dune. In 2019, "Oh lala lalalala" was released in Spanglish.

=== 2020–present: Stars ===
In 2020, Loona released the album "Stars", a greatest hits album. In December of that year, she released "Alquin Canto", a cover version of Udo Jürgens' "Was ich dir sagen will". Loona sung this song live with Udo Jürgens on his birthday at "Die 66-Jahre-Gala" in German ZDF television.

== Personal life ==
On 10 February 2005, Van der Kolk gave birth to daughter Saphira María with former spouse DJ Sammy, who is also a singer and performs under Firefox alongside her mother.

From July 2011 to April 2012 van der Kolk and Gina-Lisa Lohfink faked a lesbian relationship. In July 2013, van der Kolk mentioned marketing reasons as their incentive.

== Discography ==
- Lunita (1999)
- Entre dos aguas (2000)
- Colors (2002)
- Wind of Time (2005)
- Moonrise (2008)
- Rakatakata (Un Rayo de Sol) (2013)
- Badam (2016)
