= Bandolero (song) =

Single by Paradisio

from the album Paradisio
- Released: 1996
- Length: 3:53
- Label: CNR Music/Nippon Crown
- Songwriters: Luc Rigaux; Patrick Samoy; Maria Isabel Garcia Asensio
- Producer: The Unity Mixers

Paradisio singles chronology
| "Bailando" (1996) | "Bandolero" (1996) | "Vamos a la Discoteca" (1997) |

"Bandolero" is a song by Belgian group Paradisio. It was originally released in 1996 in Belgium as the second single from their debut album, Paradisio (1997). It reached the top 20 in Belgium and was re-released in March 1998, where it reached number 11 in Italy and number 92 in France.

== Music video ==
The accompanying music video for "Bandolero" was filmed in 1996.

== Track listings ==
- CD maxi, Belgium (1996)
1. "Bandolero" (Discoteca Action Remix) - 7:05
2. "Bandolero" (Discoteca Action Remix - Short Mix) - 4:13
3. "Bandolero" (After Party Remix) - 6:00
4. "Bandolero" (Video Edit) - 3:54
5. "Bandolero" (U.S. Power Club Remix) - 7:43

== Charts ==
| Chart (1996–98) | Peak position |
|---|---|
| Belgium (Ultratop 50 Flanders) | 19 |
| Belgium (Ultratop 50 Wallonia) | 21 |
| France (SNEP) | 92 |
| Italy (Musica e dischi) | 11 |
