= Vamos a la Discoteca =

Single by Paradisio

from the album Paradisio
- Language: Spanish
- English title: "Let's Go to the Disco"
- Released: 1997
- Genre: Eurodance
- Length: 3:53
- Label: Dance Development; Arcade Music Company
- Songwriters: Luc Rigaux; Patrick Samoy; Maria Isabel Garcia Asensio
- Producer: The Unity Mixers

Paradisio singles chronology
"Bandolero" (1996)	"Vamos a la Discoteca" (1997)	"Dime Como" (1997)

Music video
- "Vamos a la Discoteca" on YouTube

"Vamos a la Discoteca" (English: "Let's Go to the Disco") is a song by Belgian Eurodance group Paradisio, released in 1997 as the third single from their debut album, Paradisio (1997). It is a reworked song from their first release in 1995, "Un Clima Ideal", with the same lyrics, written by group members Luc Rigaux, Patrick Samoy and Maria Isabel Garcia Asensio. "Vamos a la Discoteca" became a successful European hit, reaching the top-five in both Finland and Sweden, and the top 10 in Denmark, Italy and Norway. Additionally, it was a top-20 hit in Belgium and France. On the Eurochart Hot 100, it peaked at number 21 in August 1997. The accompanying music video was filmed on Harbour Island, Bahamas.

== Track listings ==
- 12-inch, Belgium (1997)
1. "Vamos a la Discoteca" (Club Extended Mix) — 8:53
2. "Vamos a la Discoteca" (Video Edit Mix) — 3:53
- 12-inch - Remix, France (1997)
1. "Vamos a la Discoteca" (Rio Club Remix) — 6:13
2. "Vamos a la Discoteca" (Club Extended Mix) — 8:53
- CD single, Belgium (1997)
1. "Vamos a la Discoteca" (Video Edit Mix) — 3:53
2. "Vamos a la Discoteca" (Instrumental Mix) — 3:53
- CD maxi, Europe (1997)
1. "Vamos a la Discoteca" (Holiday Party Remix) — 6:02
2. "Vamos a la Discoteca" (Rio Club Remix) — 6:13
3. "Vamos a la Discoteca" (Original Club Extended Mix) — 8:53
4. "Vamos a la Discoteca" (Hypnotyka Sun Remix) — 5:38
5. "Vamos a la Discoteca" (Video Edit Mix) — 3:53

== Charts ==
=== Weekly charts ===
Chart (1995–1997)	Peak position
Belgium (Ultratop 50 Flanders)	20
Belgium (Ultratop 50 Wallonia)	18
Denmark (IFPI)	10
Europe (Eurochart Hot 100)	21
Finland (Suomen virallinen lista)	3
France (SNEP)	18
Italy (FIMI)	7
Norway (VG-lista)	6
Sweden (Sverigetopplistan)	3

=== Year-end charts ===
Chart (1997)	Position
Belgium (Ultratop 50 Flanders)	87
Belgium (Ultratop 50 Wallonia)	93
Sweden (Topplistan)	29

== Certifications ==
Region	Certification	Certified units/sales
Norway (IFPI Norway)	Gold	
Sweden (GLF)	Gold	15,000^{^}
^{^} Shipments figures based on certification alone.
