= Pashanim =

German rapper (born 2000)

- Born: Can David Bayram; 30 November 2000 (age 25); Berlin, Germany
- Occupations: Rapper; songwriter; filmmaker
- Musical career
- Genres: Hip hop; German hip hop; trap; alternative hip hop
- Label: Urban Records

Can David Bayram (born 30 November 2000), better known by his stage name Pashanim, is a German rapper and filmmaker.

== Life and career ==
Bayram was born on 30 November 2000, in the Kreuzberg district of Berlin, Germany. His mother is German, his father is of Turkish-Kurdish origin.

He started rapping when he was twelve years old, and in 2017, he founded the rap collective Playboysmafia alongside fellow rappers Symba (Rapper), Abuglitsch, and RB 030. In 2018, he released his first songs via the online distribution site SoundCloud.

Bayram first rose to prominence in early 2020 with the track "Shababs botten", peaking at number 84 on the German charts, having gained traction after being widely used on the video-sharing platform TikTok. In May 2020, his single "Airwaves" reached number two on the German charts, marking his major commercial breakthrough. On 28 December 2020, he released his EP junge ceos 2, premiering three tracks.

After a promotional phase in which the songs Mittelmeer and Florenz were released as singles, his debut album 2000 was released on June 13, 2024.

At the beginning of summer 2025, Pashanim released the EP Grünewürfelflow on April 30.

On 20 November 2025, Pashanim released his new mixtape junge ceos 1.

In addition to his rapping career, he works as a cinematographer, and has filmed music videos for German artists such as Juju, Nura, and Casper. Furthermore, he has directed the music videos for his own songs "Shababs botten", "Hauseingang", and "Airwaves".

At the beginning of 2026 Pashanim released ''BLN'' with AK Ausserkontrolle.

== Discography ==
=== Studio albums ===
List of studio albums, with chart positions
Title	Album details	Peak chart positions		
Title	Album details	GER	AUT	SWI
2000	Released: 13 June 2024; Label: Urban; Formats: Music download, streaming	1	3	1
Lounge Musik	Released: 24 July 2026; Label: Urban; Formats: Music download, streaming	1	1	1

=== Mixtapes ===
List of mixtapes, with chart positions
Title	Album details	Peak chart positions		
Title	Album details	GER	AUT	SWI
Himmel über Berlin	Released: 28 September 2022; Label: Urban; Formats: Music download, streaming	4	5	1
Grünewürfelflow	Released: 30 April 2025; Label: Urban; Formats: Music download, streaming	2	2	2

=== Extended plays ===
List of extended plays
Title	EP details
Junge CEOs 2	Released: 28 December 2020; Label: Urban; Formats: Download, streaming
Tage vor 2000	Released: 21 December 2023; Formats: Download, streaming

=== Singles ===
List of singles as lead artist, with chart positions and certifications
Title	Year	Peak chart positions				Certifications	Album
Title	Year	GER	AUT	SWI	WW	Certifications	Album
"Homicides" (featuring Chapo102)	2019	—	—	—	—		Non-album singles
"Zwannis"	2019	—	—	—	—		Non-album singles
"Shababs botten"	2019	84	—	—	—	BVMI: Gold	Non-album singles
"Hauseingang"	2019	56	—	—	—	BVMI: Platinum	Non-album singles
"Airwaves"	2020	2	6	13	—	BVMI: Platinum	Non-album singles
"Sommergewitter"	2021	1	2	3	147	BVMI: 3× Gold	Non-album singles
"Paris Freestyle (Skrilla remix)" (with Skrilla)	2021	3	13	15	—	BVMI: Gold	Non-album singles
"Allein allein" (with Ufo361)	2021	13	21	34	—		Non-album singles
"Kleiner Prinz"	2022	4	7	5	—		Non-album singles
"Bagchaser Can"	2023	4	5	6	—		Non-album singles
"Mittelmeer"	2024	1	2	4	—		2000
"Florenz"	2024	9	24	27	—		2000
"Shabab(e)s im VIP" (with Ceren)	2025	1	1	3	—		Grünewürfelflow

=== Featured in ===
List of singles as lead artist, with chart positions and certifications
Title	Year	Peak chart positions	Album
Title	Year	GER	Album
"Cripwalks" (BHZ feat. Pashanim & Monk)	2020	89	Non-album single
"Hentai" (Kasimir1441 feat. Pashanim)	2020	41	Kickdown EP

=== Other singles ===
List of other singles, with chart positions
Title	Year	Peak chart positions	Album
Title	Year	GER	Album
"Homicides" (with Chapo 102)	2019	—	Non-album single
"Istanbul Freestyle"	2021	39	Junge CEOs 2
"Junge CEOs"	2021	45	Junge CEOs 2
"sportback"	2021	—	Junge CEOs 2

== Music videos ==
Title	Year	Director(s)
"Mehringdamm laufen"	2018	RB 030
"Homicides"	2019	RB 030
"Shababs botten"	2019	Ruhi Baltrak, Pashanim
"Hauseingang"	2019	Felix Aaron, Pashanim
"Airwaves"	2020	Pashanim
"Sommergewitter"	2021	Canonulldreinull (Pashanim)
"Kleiner Prinz"	2022	Canonulldreinull, Paul Fanger
"Tourlife.mp4"	2022	Canonulldreinull
"Doppel G"	2022	Canonulldreinull, Paul Fanger
"21"	2022	Canonulldreinull, Paul Fanger
"Ms. Jackson"	2023	Canonulldreinull, Paul Fanger
"Airberlin"	2023	Canonulldreinull
"Mittelmeer"	2024	Canonulldreinull, Paul Fanger
"Florenz"	2024	Canonulldreinull, Paul Fanger

== Awards and nominations ==
=== Results ===
Year	Award	Nomination	Work	Result	Ref.
2020	HipHop.de Awards	Best Song National	Airwaves	Won	
2020	HipHop.de Awards	Best Newcomer National	Himself	Nominated	
2021	1LIVE Krone Awards	Best Hip-Hop Act	Himself	Nominated	
2024	HipHop.de Awards	Best Album National	2000	Won	
2024	HipHop.de Awards	Best Video National	Mittelmeer	Won	
