= La Fiesta Mall =

La Fiesta Shopping Center
- Location: San Roque, Saipan, Northern Mariana Islands
- Opened: April 26, 1993
- Closed: May 2004
- Num. of stores: 40+
- Num. of anchor tenants: 0
- Floor area: 175,000 sq ft (16,300 m^{2}).
- Floors: 3
- Parking: 140 parking spaces

La Fiesta Mall was an open-air shopping center located in one of the northern villages of San Roque, Saipan, Northern Mariana Islands. It opened in 1992. The mall, which closed in 2004, was the only one of its kind in the Commonwealth of the Northern Mariana Islands and is now considered a dead mall.

== Mall history ==
The La Fiesta Shopping Center opened in 1992 with several shops and restaurants. A Japanese firm, Coco's Lagoon Development Corporation based in Guam, purchased the mall in San Roque on May 20, 2002, from Japan Air Lines, which owns and operates Nikko Hotel Saipan. The Northern Marianas College bought a portion of the mall to expand its grounds up north in 2003 but withdrew its decision, which left the mall with many empty retail spaces. Over the years, the mall has had numerous investors with ideas to redevelop the mall for the local population, but canceled due to the CNMI's economic sustainability. In 2007, the former shopping center was going to be renovated for a new Junior High/High School for the island of Saipan until the government decided not to do so. In late January 2012, the body of a murdered woman was found in one of the plaza courts of the shopping center.

Today, La Fiesta Mall is owned by the CNMI government and remains abandoned and defunct.

== Shops, restaurants and attractions ==
The open-air Shopping center had three plazas which held many local businesses along with numerous luxury shops like GUESS, Chanel, Rolex and restaurants such as Tony Roma's. On special occasions the mall would hold certain events and contest such as trick-or-treating on Halloween, Easter egg hunts, snowman building, art shows and dance competitions. Every other night or weekend, cultural performers of dance and music would perform at the main court of the mall.

== Rehabilitation ==
Like most of the dead malls in the United States or, as in the Marianas case, its territories, leasing or management companies may change the architecture, layout, decor, or other component of a shopping center to attract more renters and draw more profits. Since 2009, local newspaper articles in the Saipan Tribune and Marianas Variety News & Views have said the government has asked the people of the CNMI and investors to propose ideas for revitalizing the shopping plaza. The plan was called the "La Fiesta Mall rebirth" and since the plan was adopted the government has gotten at least three proposals all with the estimated amount of $5 million.
