= Hijo de la Luna =

Mecano song

- Cover variant of its UK release in 1987

Single by Mecano

from the album Entre el cielo y el suelo
- Language: Spanish
- B-side: "Te busqué" (ESP) "Por la cara" (UK)
- Released: 1986
- Genre: Piano rock, new wave, synth-pop
- Length: 4:18 (UK release)
- Label: Ariola
- Songwriter: José Maria Cano
- Producers: José Maria Cano, Nacho Cano, Ana Torroja

Mecano singles chronology
"Une femme avec une femme"	"Hijo de la Luna"	"Nature morte"

Audio sample
- "Hijo de la Luna": file; help

"Hijo de la Luna" (Spanish for 'Son of the Moon') is a song written by José María Cano performed originally by the Spanish band Mecano with lead singer Ana Torroja. It appeared on their 1986 album, Entre el cielo y el suelo, and had great success all over the Spanish-speaking world, as did the album. From 28 December 1998 to 16 January 1999, a cover version by Loona topped the German charts, and reached number two on the Swiss singles' chart.

== Original version ==
=== Lyrics ===
The lyrics depict a tragic Romani legend of a Roma woman who awakes at sunrise, begging to the moon to marry a Roma man (calé) the same day. In exchange the moon asks for the woman's first-born as payment.

After the child is born, the woman and man are dismayed to see that his skin is the whitest white and his eyes are grey, even though they both have dark skin and dark eyes. The lyrics explain that the child is an albino, due to being a son of the moon. But the man presumes that the father is a payo (a non-Roma person) and furiously stabs his wife to death. He takes the child and abandons him on a mountain, leaving the child to die of exposure.

Later the baby is said to live happily ever after with the Moon as his mother. When the child cries, the Moon wanes to cradle and comfort him.

The chorus says that the moon wants to be a mother, yet cannot find a lover who will make her his wife, and questions her as to what she would do with a human child. The French translation of the song asks a more precise question (Tell me, silvery moon, You who has no arms, How will you rock the child?), which is answered in the last stanza (And whenever the child cries, She [The Moon] crescents, Turning herself into a light-cradle).

In turn, the Moon doubts the mother's commitment to the little boy, wondering how much she can love her child if she is eager to trade him for a partner.

=== Inspirations ===
The video clip for the Italian version Figlio della luna has a esthetic related to the 1981 film Blood Wedding by Carlos Saura.

=== Track listings ===
7" single

1. "Hijo de la luna" – 4:21
2. "Mujer contra mujer" – 4:06

CD maxi

1. "Hijo de la luna" – 4:18
2. "Por la cara" – 3:06
3. "El cine" – 4:01

=== Charts ===
==== Weekly charts ====
Chart (1987)	Peak position
Paraguay (AP)	2

Chart (1990–1991)	Peak position
Belgium (Ultratop 50 Flanders)	18
Europe (Eurochart Hot 100)	40
Netherlands (Dutch Top 40)	3
Netherlands (Single Top 100)	5
France (SNEP)	6
West Germany (GfK)	45

==== Year-end charts ====
Chart (1989)	Position
West Germany (Media Control)	45

Chart (1990)	Position
Netherlands (Dutch Top 40)	39
Netherlands (Single Top 100)	25

=== Certifications ===
Region	Certification	Certified units/sales
France (SNEP)	Silver	125,000^{*}
^{*} Sales figures based on certification alone.

== Loona version ==
"Hijo de la Luna"

Single by Loona

from the album Lunita
- B-side: "Another Christmas Without You"
- Released: 23 November 1998
- Length: 4:08
- Label: Urban
- Songwriter: José Maria Cano
- Producer: DJ Sammy

Loona singles chronology
"Bailando" (1998)	"Hijo de la Luna" (1998)	"Dónde Vas" (1999)

Dutch recording artist Loona covered the song and released it as the second single from her debut studio album, Lunita (1999). Issued through Urban Records on 23 November 1998, the song topped the German Singles Chart in December 1998 and January 1999. Loona's version is certified triple gold in Germany and gold in Switzerland.

=== Track listings ===
CD single

1. "Hijo de la luna" (Sentimiento version) – 4:08
2. "Another Christmas Without You" – 4:11

Maxi-CD single

1. "Hijo de la luna" (Sentimiento version) – 4:08
2. "Hijo de la luna" (radio remix version) – 3:52
3. "Another Christmas Without You" – 4:11
4. "Hijo de la luna" (instrumental version) – 4:15
5. "Hijo de la luna" (Flip Mjc acappella version) – 3:20

=== Charts ===
==== Weekly charts ====
Chart (1998–1999)	Peak position
Austria (Ö3 Austria Top 40)	3
Europe (Eurochart Hot 100)	8
Germany (GfK)	1
Netherlands (Dutch Top 40)	18
Netherlands (Single Top 100)	21
Switzerland (Schweizer Hitparade)	2

==== Year-end charts ====
Chart (1999)	Position
Austria (Ö3 Austria Top 40)	34
Europe (Eurochart Hot 100)	59
Germany (Media Control)	17
Switzerland (Schweizer Hitparade)	21

=== Certifications ===
Region	Certification	Certified units/sales
Germany (BVMI)	3× Gold	750,000^{^}
Switzerland (IFPI Switzerland)	Gold	25,000^{^}
^{^} Shipments figures based on certification alone.

== Other versions ==
This song was covered by the Spanish operatic soprano Montserrat Caballé, by Sarah Brightman, by German metal band Haggard and by Spanish gothic metal band Stravaganzza.

In 2019, the South Korean crossover male vocal quartet Forestella published a cover on their album 'Mystique'
