= Fiesta (Miranda album) =

Studio album by Miranda
- Released: November 1999
- Recorded: 1999
- Genre: Europop, Eurodance
- Length: 48:23
- Label: Universal

Singles from Fiesta
- 1. "Vamos a la playa" Released: June 1999; 2. "Eldorado" Released: 2000; 3. "A la fiesta" Released: 2000

Fiesta is an album by French Eurodance group Miranda, released in November 1999 by Universal in Europe.

== Track listing ==
No.	Title	Length
1.	"Eldorado"	3:43
2.	"Vamos a la playa"	3:13
3.	"Baila"	3:10
4.	"A la fiesta"	3:35
5.	"Do It (Get Down on It)"	3:29
6.	"Hola Hey"	3:51
7.	"Max"	3:37
8.	"Summertime"	3:08
9.	"El ritmo del sol"	3:35
10.	"Special DJ"	3:55
11.	"Macho Man"	3:13
12.	"Try It Out"	3:31
13.	"Movie Star"	4:24
14.	"A la fiesta" (London radio edit)	4:04

== Release history ==
Release format	Country	Release date	Label
Regular album	Europe	November 1999	Universal
Regular album	Canada	June 1, 2000	Universal
Regular album	United States	September 27, 2000	Universal
