= Vamos a la playa (Miranda song) =

1998 single by Miranda

Single by Miranda

from the album Fiesta
- Released: 15 October 1998
- Length: 3:04
- Label: EMI
- Songwriters: Giovanni Monza; Luigi Confortini; Noam Kaniel
- Producer: The Extravaganza Corporation

Miranda singles chronology
"Vamos a la playa" (1998)	"A la fiesta" (1999)

Music video
- "Vamos a la playa" on YouTube

"Vamos a la playa" is a song by French Eurodance group Miranda, released in 1998 as the lead single from their debut studio album, Fiesta (1999). It peaked at number 7 on the Dutch singles chart, at number 4 on the Italian singles chart and at number 8 on the RPM Dance chart in Canada. The vocals were performed by La Velle.

The Miranda version is known for being used as the theme tune of the final round on the Italian game show Passaparola. Dutch singer Loona covered the song in 2010.

== Track listings ==
- French CD single
1. "Vamos a la playa" (Ibiza radio edit) – 3:04
2. "Vamos a la playa" (Ibiza club mix) – 5:08
3. "Vamos a la playa" (original radio edit) – 3:40
- French 12-inch single

A. "Vamos a la playa" (Ibiza club mix) – 5:08
B1. "Vamos a la playa" (London club remix) – 5:00
B2. "Vamos a la playa" (Ibiza radio edit) – 3:04

- German CD maxi-single
1. "Vamos a la playa" (video edit) – 3:13
2. "Vamos a la playa" (Ibiza club mix) – 5:08
3. "Vamos a la playa" (London club mix) – 4:40
4. "Vamos a la playa" (Mosso Bandidos extended) – 5:25
5. "Vamos a la playa" (Mosso Bandidos edit) – 3:33
6. "Vamos a la playa" (Subside Latino remix) – 5:37
7. "Vamos a la playa" (Subside Euro remix) – 5:34

== Charts ==
=== Weekly charts ===
Chart (1999–2000)	Peak position
Canada (Nielsen SoundScan)	9
Canada Dance/Urban (RPM)	8
Italy (Musica e dischi/FIMI)	4
Italy Airplay (Music & Media)	5
Netherlands (Dutch Top 40)	7
Netherlands (Single Top 100)	7

=== Year-end charts ===
Chart (1999)	Position
Netherlands (Dutch Top 40)	67
Netherlands (Single Top 100)	79

== Release history ==
Region	Date	Format(s)	Label(s)	Ref.
Europe	1998	—N/a	Various	
Canada	18 January 2000	CD	Popular	

== Loona version ==
"Vamos a la playa"

Single by Loona

from the album Summer Dance
- Released: 2010
- Length: 2:57
- Songwriters: Noam Kaniel; Johnny Williams; Louis Element

Loona singles chronology
"Parapapapapa" (2009)	"Vamos a la playa" (2010)	"El cucaracho, el muchacho" (2010)

Dutch singer Loona covered the song and released it in 2010 as the second single from her album Summer Dance. It reached number 3 on the Belgian singles chart in Wallonia and peaked at number 4 on the French singles chart.

=== Charts ===
==== Weekly charts ====
Chart (2010–2011)	Peak position
Belgium (Ultratop 50 Flanders)	34
Belgium (Ultratop 50 Wallonia)	3
Denmark (Tracklisten)	24
France (SNEP)	4
Germany (GfK)	32
Sweden (Sverigetopplistan)	40
Switzerland (Schweizer Hitparade)	16

==== Year-end charts ====
Chart (2011)	Position
Belgium (Ultratop 50 Wallonia)	38
France (SNEP)	23

== See also ==
- 2011 in European music
- List of top 100 singles of 2011 (France)
