= Fiesta (apple) =

Apple cultivar

Malus domestica 'Fiesta'
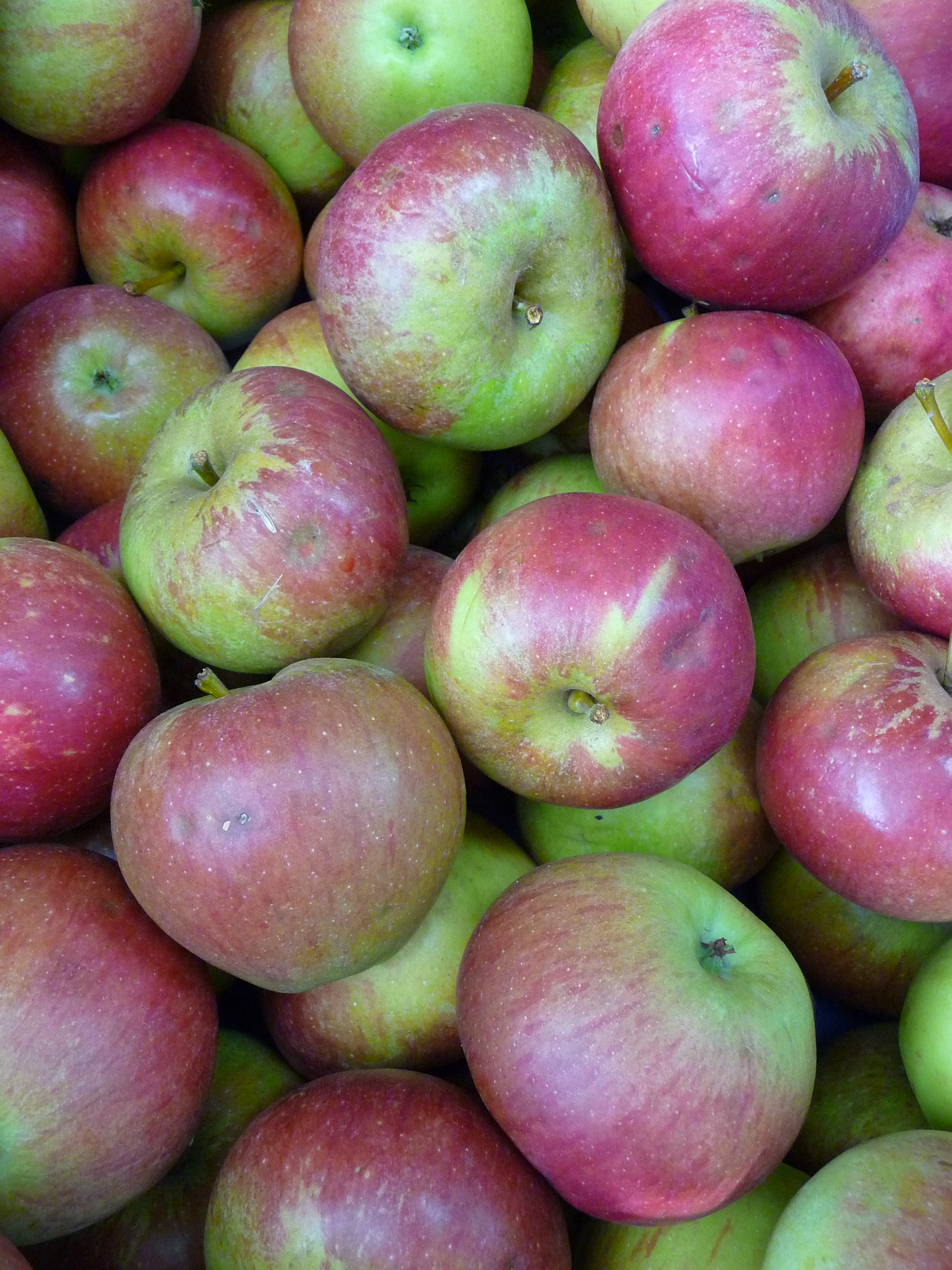
- Hybrid parentage: 'Cox's Orange Pippin' × 'Idared'
- Cultivar: 'Fiesta'
- Origin: United Kingdom, 1950 - 1999

Fiesta is a modern cultivar of domesticated apple which is often marketed as Red Pippin. It was developed in the United Kingdom by breeders at the East Malling Research Station, combining the Cox's Orange Pippin with the Idared apple. According to the Orange Pippin website, it is one of the best Cox's style apples, but much easier to grow having good disease resistance.

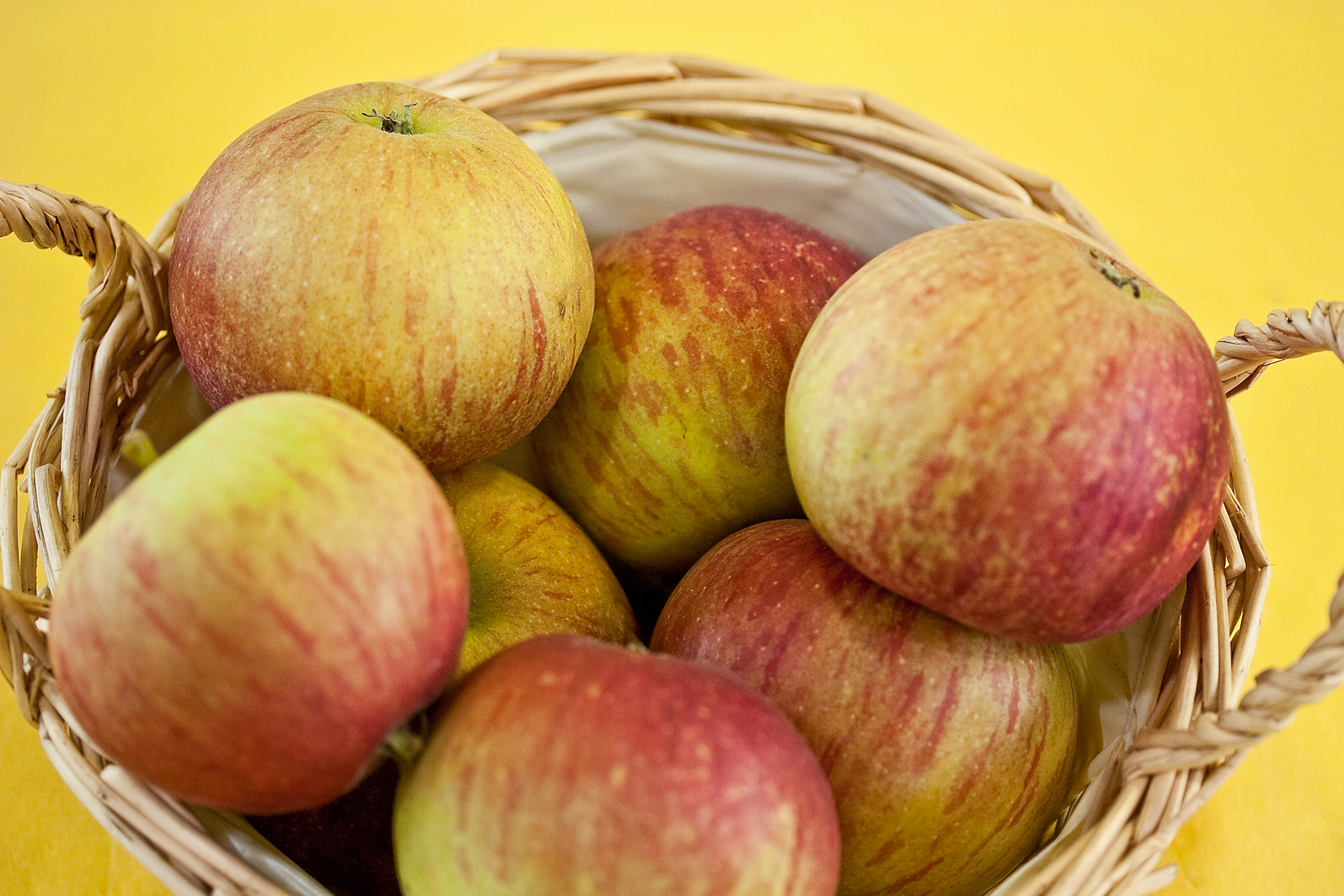
Fiesta.

It is a sweet apple, nutty and aromatic, which can be used as a dessert apple, for juice and for (hard) cider. Its skin is yellow, flushed and striped in colours ranging from orange to red, and has some apple russeting. Its harvesting season is late, and it keeps fresh for three months or more.
