= Wind of Time =

Studio album by Loona
- Released: 2005
- Recorded: 2004–2005
- Genre: Pop
- Label: Universal
- Producer: DJ Sammy

Loona chronology
Colors (2002)	Wind of Time (2005)	Everybody on the Floor (2007)

Singles from Wind of Time
- 1. "Tears in Heaven" Released: 2004

Wind of Time is the fourth album by Dutch recording artist Loona and produced by DJ Sammy. It was released in 2005 via Universal. This album marks the third and final Loona album release through Universal, and also the final one, produced by DJ Sammy, after they separated professionally and privately. The album includes the first and only single "Tears in Heaven".

== Background ==
After her previous album release back in 2002, van der Kolk began recording the single "Tears in Heaven", an Eric Clapton cover version, in 2004, released of her fourth studio album "Wind of Time", followed in 2005. The album is a collection full of cover versions. According to van der Kolk, she dedicated the album title, selected track list and the entire album to her mother, whom she lost ten years ago. It features covers such as Procol Harum's "A Whiter Shade of Pale", Peter Sarstedt's "Where Do You Go to My Lovely", Ralph McTell's "Streets of London", Sting's "Fragile" or Bob Dylan's "Blowin' In The Wind". This album marks the third and final Loona album release through Universal, and also the final DJ Sammy produced album, after van der Kolk separated with him professionally and personally.

== Content ==
Wind of Time is a pop cover album, comprising a collection of selected ballads full of cover versions. It combines a mature pop sound recorded with classical and orchestral elements mixed with alternative and acoustic guitar riffs. The song themes features of sad and dark content, the darkest ever released on a Loona album, due to the dedication to her mother, whom she lost, her professional and personal separation with her then-husband Samuel Bouriah and her sad feelings at that time. Wind of Time is Loona's first album with a track list full of only English titles and almost completely performed in English, unlike on her previous Spanish/English mixed releases. However the only Spanish content on the album is the second verse of "Fragile". The lyrics of "If Only" have slightly been changed. The album features twelve songs, one of them being a remix, the "Pop Version" of "Tears in Heaven".

== Commercial performance ==
Both, the single "Tears in Heaven" and the album Wind of Time, didn't gained much promotion and high performances, due to van der Kolk's pregnancy with her first child at that time, her daughter named Saphira Maria, welcomed in 2005. However the single peaked #46 at the German Single Chart respectively. She emotionally performed "Tears In Heaven" at "The Dome" crying and being pregnant.

== Singles ==
- "Tears in Heaven", an Eric Clapton cover version, was released as the first and only single from the album.

== Track listing ==
No.	Title	Writer(s)	Producer(s)	Length
1.	"Tears in Heaven"	Eric Clapton; Will Jennings	DJ Sammy; Team 33	3:50
2.	"If Only"	Roderick Stewart; James Cregan; Kevin Savigar	Sammy	4:35
3.	"A Whiter Shade of Pale"	Gary Brooker; Keith Reid; Matthew Fisher	Sammy	3:30
4.	"She"	Shahnour Aznavourian; Herbert Kretzmer	Sammy	3:37
5.	"When I See You Smile"	Diane Warren	Sammy	5:06
6.	"The Rose"	Amanda McBroom	Sammy; Joris Vincken	3:13
7.	"Streets of London"	Ralph May	Sammy	4:11
8.	"Blowin' In The Wind"	Robert Zimmerman	Sammy	4:16
9.	"Fragile"	Gordon Sumner	Sammy	3:43
10.	"With Or Without You"	Paul Hewson; David Evans; Adam Clayton; Laurence Mullen	Sammy	4:16
11.	"Where Do You Go to My Lovely"	Peter Sarstedt	Sammy	3:30
Total length:				40:17

Bonus track
No.	Title	Writer(s)	Producer(s)	Length
12.	"Tears in Heaven" (Pop Version)	Clapton	Sammy	3:51
Total length:				44:08

Notes

- "Tears in Heaven" is a cover of Eric Clapton.
- "If Only " is a cover of Rod Stewart.
- "A Whiter Shade of Pale" is a cover of Procol Harum.
- "She" is a cover of Charles Aznavour.
- "When I See You Smile" is a cover of Bad English.
- "The Rose" is a cover of Bette Midler.
- "Streets of London" is a cover of Ralph McTell.
- "Blowin' In The Wind" is a cover of Bob Dylan.
- "Fragile" is a cover of Sting.
- "With Or Without You" is a cover of U2.
- "Where Do You Go to My Lovely" is a cover of Peter Sarstedt.
