= Fiesta Online =

Free-to-play MMORPG for Microsoft Windows

- Developer: gamigo AG
- Publishers: NA: gamigo AG; EU: gamigo AG
- Platform: Microsoft Windows
- Release: NA: 2007-11-07
- Genre: MMORPG
- Mode: Multiplayer

Fiesta is a free-to-play massively multiplayer online role-playing game (MMORPG) for Microsoft Windows. Fiesta features an anime style characters rendered in 3D. Fiesta Online was originally published in 2003 but was later published by Outspark and subsequently taken over by Gamigo AG.

== Publication and development ==
The game was developed by Ons On Soft. The development team created all the content and material. However, they had to seek out a publisher.

=== Development ===
It was originally released in Korea in July 2006 through self-publication. It later expanded overseas the following year when Outspark picked it up. Gamigo published the game in Europe.

On February 6, 2013, Gamigo acquired the North American licensing rights to Fiesta Online from Outspark.

On April 29, 2014, Gamigo announced that Fiesta Online had been greenlit. The territory of each zone is tracked via Steam and will open the correct page. Players can still download the launcher manually to play the other versions.

On March 2, 2016 Gamigo announced it had assumed development rights to the game worldwide. OnsOne Soft LTD and Gamigo declared that the entire development process would switch over to Gamigo completely, an event that occurred by May 17, 2016.

== Gameplay ==
=== Classes ===
There are six classes in Fiesta Online: trickster (damage dealer and damage over time), mage (damage dealer and area effects), archer (damage over time and area effects), fighter (tank and damage dealer), crusader (damage dealer and support), and cleric (support and tank). The crusader is a "heroic class" that must be unlocked and begins play at a higher level than the others.

=== Skills ===
The game has three categories of skills. Active skills are generally combat skills that consume resources. Passive skills, once learned, continually affect the character. Alchemy allows for the creation of consumable items with a variety of benefits, to break down items into their components, or to create better items.

=== Money ===
In-game currency comes in four forms: copper, silver, gold, and gem. One gem is the equivalent of 100 gold; one gold is the equivalent of 1,000 silver; and one silver is the equivalent of 1,000 copper. Players can earn in-game currency through the successful completion of quests and by selling in-game items.

Additionally, the game makes use of microtransactions, exchanging real currency for virtual currency, which is then used to purchase from the in-game cash shop.

=== Titles ===
Titles are given to players, which they can then apply to the beginning of their name. E.g., "popular" is given to a player when they have a certain number of people on their friends list, or "monster joke punchline" when they are killed by the same monster ten times in a row. Some titles may give benefits to players, such as increased defense or extra skill points.

=== Cards ===
Fiesta has collectible cards which can be obtained from killing monsters. These cards can be traded between players and some cards give a hidden title, which is an incentive to collect all of them. Also, collecting a large number will gives the player bonus and exclusive items, such as legendary mini-pets.

=== Guilds ===
Guilds in Fiesta can declare war on other guilds, but a given guild can only declare one war itself. There is also a limit to the location of a war between guilds; once a war has begun, all maps become off limits to PvP fights, with the exception of certain towns. To initiate a guild war, interested guilds issue a challenge to other guilds. Guilds are also able to compete with other guild through guild tournaments called "Relics of War".

=== Player versus player ===
There are free PvP areas in each of the towns: each main town has its own "free battle zone", with Elderine, Uruga, and Alberstol Ruins having additional Abyss maps, which are PvP zones with additional monsters in them that provide extra experience for the player when killed. Abyss maps are designed to be areas that offer high rewards, but with high risks. Players can enter and spawn kill lower levels, whilst others will enter simply to take advantage of the faster experience gain.

=== In-game weddings ===
Players can propose to one another with wedding rings, and after acceptance both players obtain wedding applications. These are converted to invitations, which allow up to thirty players to be invited to teleport to a wedding ceremony. Upon the completion of ceremony, the wedded couple receives in-game benefits.

=== Estate System ===
The Estate System allows players to do a multi-part quest which will give them the ability to create their own instanced estate, which they may decorate or socialize in.
