= Fire (Scooter song) =

Single by Scooter

from the album Age of Love
- B-side: "Choir Dance"
- Released: 27 March 1997
- Length: 3:31
- Label: Club Tools, Rock
- Songwriters: H.P. Baxxter; Rick J. Jordan; Ferris Bueller; Jens Thele
- Producer: Scooter

Scooter singles chronology
| "Break It Up" (1996) | "Fire" (1997) | "The Age of Love" (1997) |

Music video
- "Fire" on YouTube

"Fire" is a song by German hard dance band Scooter, released on 27 March 1997, by label Club Tools, as the first single from their fourth album, Age of Love (1997).

== Critical reception ==
British magazine Music Week rated the song four out of five, writing, "The German outfit mesh thrashing guitars with a pumping dance beat, giving off enough energy to rip the roof off. Should blaze a trail into the Top 30."

== Track listings ==
=== Original version ===
- CD maxi
1. "Fire" – 3:31
2. "Fire" (Extended Emergency) – 5:10
3. "Choir Dance" – 4:19
4. "Fire Dub 1" – 4:59
- Limited CD maxi
1. "Fire" – 3:31
2. "Fire" (Extended Emergency) – 5:10
3. "Choir Dance" – 4:19
4. "Fire Dub 1" – 4:59
5. "Hyper Hyper" (live) – 5:02
- 12-inch
1. "Fire" (Extended Emergency) – 5:10
2. "Fire Dub 1" – 4:59
3. "Fire Dub 2" – 5:12
- Cassette
1. "Fire" – 3:31
2. "Fire" (Extended Emergency) – 5:10
- US CD maxi
1. "Fire" (album version) – 3:31
2. "Fire" (Extended Emergency) – 5:10
3. "Fire" (Klubbheads remix) – 6:53
4. "Fire" (DONS Burn Rubber mix) – 6:32
5. "Fire Dub 2" – 5:12
- French CD single
1. "Fire" – 3:31
2. "Fire Dub 1" – 4:59
- US 12-inch
1. "Fire" (Extended Emergency) – 5:10
2. "Fire" (Klubbheads remix) – 6:53
3. "Fire" (album version) – 3:31
4. "Fire" (DONS Burn Rubber mix) – 6:32
5. "Hyper Hyper" (live) – 5:02

== Charts ==
=== Weekly charts ===
| Chart (1997–1998) | Peak position |
|---|---|
| Austria (Ö3 Austria Top 40) | 5 |
| Europe (Eurochart Hot 100) | 16 |
| Finland (Suomen virallinen lista) | 1 |
| Germany (GfK) | 5 |
| Hungary (Mahasz) | 2 |
| Ireland (IRMA) | 28 |
| Israel (Israeli Singles Chart) | 8 |
| Norway (VG-lista) | 10 |
| Scottish Singles Sales (Official Charts) | 16 |
| Sweden (Sverigetopplistan) | 7 |
| Switzerland (Schweizer Hitparade) | 11 |
| UK Singles (Official Charts) | 45 |
| US Dance Club Play (Billboard) | 30 |

=== Year-end charts ===
| Chart (1997) | Position |
|---|---|
| Austria (Ö3 Austria Top 40) | 32 |
| Europe (Eurochart Hot 100) | 94 |
| Germany (Media Control) | 45 |
| Romania (Romanian Top 100) | 45 |
| Sweden (Topplistan) | 64 |

== Certifications and sales ==
| Region | Certification | Certified units/sales |
|---|---|---|
| Finland | — | 5,334 |
| Germany (BVMI) | Gold | 250,000^{^} |
^{^} Shipments figures based on certification alone.
