= Fiesta (TV series) =

- Genre: Music television
- Starring: Gino Hernandez Sextet; Ron Fabri
- Country of origin: Australia
- Original language: English

Production
- Running time: 30 minutes

Original release
- Network: ABC Television
- Release: 1958 – 1958

Fiesta is an Australian television series which aired in 1958 on ABC Television. Described as a "Latin-American dance and song programme", it was produced in Sydney, and kinescoped ("telerecorded") for broadcast in Melbourne.

The series featured the Gino Hernandez Sextet, as well as singer Ron Fabri. Episodes were 30-minutes in duration, in black-and-white. It is not known if any of the episodes still exist, given the varied survival rates of early ABC programming.

== See also ==
- Cafe Continental - 1958 ABC variety series
