= The Age of Love (Scooter song) =

Single by Scooter

from the album Age of Love
- B-side: "Turn Up That Blaster"
- Released: 11 August 1997
- Recorded: 1997
- Genre: Hard dance
- Length: 3:50
- Label: Club Tools
- Songwriters: H.P. Baxxter; Rick J. Jordan; Ferris Bueller; Jens Thele
- Producer: Rick J. Jordan

Scooter singles chronology
"Fire" (1997)	"The Age of Love" (1997)	"No Fate" (1997)

Music video
- "The Age of Love" on YouTube

"The Age of Love" is a song by German group Scooter, released in August 1997 by label Club Tools as the second and final single from their fourth album, Age of Love (1997). It is based on a sample of the theme to the 1991 film Terminator 2: Judgment Day. The song is also present in the German TV series Alarm für Cobra 11 - Die Autobahnpolizei, in the episode "Tödlicher Ruhm", where Andre Fux (Mark Keller) must rescue his best friend (portrayed by the same singer) by some criminals

== Track listings ==
- Original version
1. "The Age of Love" – 3:50
2. "The Age of Love" (Club Mix) – 6:07
3. "Turn Up That Blaster" – 5:20
- Remixes
1. "The Age of Love" (S/M in Motion Remix) – 6:24
2. "The Age of Love" (DJ Errik's Destruction Mix) – 6:35
3. "The Age of Love" (Triple S Funky Remix) – 5:13
4. "The Age of Love" (Mad Man in Love Remix) – 8:38
5. "The Age of Love" (Original Video Edit) – 3:50

== Charts ==
Chart (1997)	Peak position
Austria (Ö3 Austria Top 40)	21
Finland (Suomen virallinen lista)	1
France (SNEP)	35
Germany (GfK)	14
Hungary (Mahasz)	3
Israel (Israeli Singles Chart)	2
Sweden (Sverigetopplistan)	20
Switzerland (Schweizer Hitparade)	21
UK Singles (OCC)	76
