= A la fiesta =

Single by Miranda

from the album Fiesta
- Released: 2000
- Genre: Eurodance
- Length: 3:35
- Label: Do It Yourself
- Songwriters: Johnny Williams, Louis Element, Noam Kaniel

Miranda singles chronology
"Eldorado" (2000)	"A la fiesta" (2000)	"Bamba! (El Ritmo De Miranda)" (2001)

"A la fiesta" is the third single by Spanish-French Eurodance group Miranda, from the album Fiesta. It reached No. 66 on the Dutch Singles Chart.

== Track listing ==
1. Ibiza radio edit - 3:35
2. London radio edit – 4:05
3. Ibiza club mix – 6:35
4. London club mix – 7:05

== Charts ==
Chart (1999)	Position
Netherlands (Single Top 100)	66
