= Miranda (group) =

French Eurodance group

- Origin: France
- Genres: Eurodance, Europop
- Years active: 1999–2001
- Label: Universal
- Past members: Sandra Miranda García; Lavelle McKinnie Duggan

Miranda is a French Eurodance group, active in Europe in the late 1990s and early 2000s. The main frontwoman of the group was the French-Spanish singer and dancer Sandra Miranda García. The group was initially signed to Universal.

== History ==
In 1998, Miranda was taking part as a dancer to the videoclip of Ricky Martin's song "María", when she met producers Louis Element and Johnny Williams. Their first release, in 1999, was the lead single from their first and only album Fiesta, "Vamos a la playa"; the song became a summer hit in the Netherlands and Italy. In 2000, they released two singles, "Eldorado" and "A la fiesta", the latter of which peaked at number 66 on the Dutch singles chart. They released one further song, the non-charting "Bamba! (El Ritmo De Miranda)".

In 2001, Miranda disbanded and the main singer signed with the label Do It Yourself for a solo career.

== Discography ==
=== Albums ===
Year	Album details
1999	Fiesta: Release date: November 1999; Label: Universal

=== Singles ===
Year	Single	Peak chart positions			Album
Year	Single	CAN Dance	ITA	NED	Album
1999	"Vamos a la playa"	8	4	7	Fiesta
2000	"Eldorado"	—	—	—	Fiesta
2000	"A la fiesta"	—	35	66	Fiesta
2001	"Bamba! (El Ritmo De Miranda)"	—	—	—	Single only
