= Bailando (Paradisio song) =

1996 single by Paradisio

Single by Paradisio

from the album Paradisio
- Language: Spanish
- English title: "Dancing"
- Released: 1996
- Length: 3:50
- Label: Arcade Music Company; Dance Development
- Songwriters: Luc Rigaux; Patrick Samoy; M.I. Garcia Asensio
- Producer: The Unity Mixers

Paradisio singles chronology
"Bailando" (1996)	"Bandolero" (1996)

Music video
- "Bailando" on YouTube

"Bailando" ("Dancing" in Spanish) is a song by Belgian group Paradisio. It was released in 1996 as the lead single from their debut album, Paradisio (1997). The song was produced by Patrick Samoy and Luc Rigaux (a.k.a. the Unity Mixers) and reached number one in Italy, Denmark, Norway, Finland and Sweden. It peaked at number two in Belgium. In Sweden, it was the best selling single by being triple platinum. The song was a hit in most countries across Europe in mid-1997. The accompanying music video was filmed in Miami, the US. The following year, "Bailando" was covered by Dutch singer Loona; this version reached number one in Germany and Switzerland.

== Critical reception ==
In 2012, Porcys listed the song at number 53 in their ranking of "100 Singles 1990–1999", adding, "It turned out that "Bailando", this synonym of the brazen dance of the nineties, is basically an almost perfect configuration of the features and attributes that I intuitively look for in popular music: sensual sexuality, playful foolishness, innocent escapism, thrilling groove and tempting hook."

== Chart performance ==
"Bailando" was very successful on the charts in Europe, making it the biggest hit by the group. It reached number-one in Denmark, Finland, Italy, Norway and Sweden. Additionally, the single managed to climb into the top 10 also in Belgium, France and Spain. In France, it sold more than 550,000 copies, reaching number four. In the United Kingdom, it only reached number 149 on the UK Singles Chart, but on the Eurochart Hot 100, it went to number 11 in July 1997. "Bailando" was awarded with a 2× platinum record in Norway and a 3× platinum record in Sweden.

== Music video ==
Two different music videos were made to accompany the song: a 1996 Belgian version and a 1997 international version. One was directed by Thierry Dory and both music videos were filmed in Miami Beach and at the Eden Roc Hotel. They were produced by Belgian Waffles Film Factory and Mona Lisa Films.

== Track listings ==
=== CD single ===
1. "Bailando" (video version) (3:50)
2. "Bailando" (instrumental extended mix) (6:48)

=== CD maxi ===
Belgium 1

1. "Bailando" (extended radio version) (6:50)
2. "Bailando" (discoteca remix) (6:52)
3. "Bailando" (ritmo el mas locomix) (6:50)
4. "Bailando" (original discoteca drums mix) (6:50)
5. "Bailando" (transologik remix) (7:08)
6. "Bailando" (radio version) (3:50)

Belgium 2

1. "Bandolero" (discoteca action remix) (7:05)
2. "Bandolero" (discoteca action remix short mix) (4:13)
3. "Bandolero" (after party remix) (6:00)
4. "Bandolero" (video edit) (3:54)
5. "Bandolero" (US power club remix) (7:43)

Finland, Sweden

1. "Bailando" (radio version) (3:48)
2. "Bailando" (2 fabiola remix) (5:05)
3. "Bailando" (discoteca remix) (6:50)
4. "Bailando" (extended radio mix) (6:48)
5. "Bailando" (ritmo el mas locomix) (6:48)
6. "Bailando" (original discoteca drums) (6:49)

Europe

1. "Bailando" (radio version) (3:48)
2. "Bailando" (extended radio version) (6:48)
3. "Bailando" (original discoteca drums mix) (6:47)
4. "Bailando" (ritmo el mas locomix) (6:48)
5. "Bailando" (Ibiza remix) (5:05)

Other countries

1. "Bailando" (radio version) (3:50)
2. "Bailando" (ritmo el mas locomix) (6:50)
3. "Bailando" (discoteca drums mix) (6:50)

=== 12-inch maxi ===
Belgium

1. "Bailando" (original discoteca drums mix) (6:50)
2. "Bailando" (discoteca remix) (6:52)
3. "Bailando" (transologik remix) (7:08)

Germany

1. "Bailando" (Ibiza remix)
2. "Bailando" (original discoteca drums mix)

Italy, Spain

1. "Bailando" (extended radio version) (6:50)
2. "Bailando" (radio version) (3:50)
3. "Bailando" (discoteca remix) (6:52)
4. "Bailando" (transologik remix) (7:08)

US

1. "Bailando" (extended radio version) (6:49)
2. "Bailando" (original discoteca drums mix) (6:49)
3. "Bailando" (transologik remix) (7:05)
4. "Bailando" (instrumental extended mix) (6:49)

== Charts ==
=== Weekly charts ===
Chart (1996–1997)	Peak position
Belgium (Ultratop 50 Flanders)	2
Belgium (Ultratop 50 Wallonia)	8
Denmark (IFPI)	1
Estonia Airplay (Eesti Top 15)	2
Europe (Eurochart Hot 100)	11
Finland (Suomen virallinen lista)	1
France (SNEP)	4
Israel (Israeli Singles Chart)	3
Italy (Musica e dischi/FIMI)	1
Netherlands (Dutch Top 40)	25
Netherlands (Single Top 100)	25
Norway (VG-lista)	1
Spain (AFYVE) remix	9
Sweden (Sverigetopplistan)	1

=== Year-end charts ===
Chart (1996)	Rank
Belgium (Ultratop 50 Flanders)	6
Belgium (Ultratop 50 Wallonia)	20
France (SNEP)	68

Chart (1997)	Rank
Europe (Eurochart Hot 100)	28
France (SNEP)	26
Norway (VG-lista)	3
Sweden (Topplistan)	4

Chart (2025)	Rank
Estonia Airplay (TopHit)	173

== Certifications and sales ==
Region	Certification	Certified units/sales
Belgium (BRMA)	Gold	25,000^{*}
Denmark (IFPI Danmark)	Gold	45,000^{‡}
Norway (IFPI Norway)	2× Platinum	
Sweden (GLF)	3× Platinum	90,000^{^}
^{*} Sales figures based on certification alone.^{^} Shipments figures based on certification alone.^{‡} Sales+streaming figures based on certification alone.

== Loona version ==
"Bailando"

Single by Loona

from the album Lunita
- B-side: "Noche Linda"
- Released: 1998
- Genre: Eurodance
- Length: 3:33
- Label: Urban Empire
- Songwriters: Luc Rigaux; Patrick Samoy; M.I. Garcia Asensio
- Producers: Samuel Bouriah; Henning Reith; The Unity Mixers

Loona singles chronology
"Bailando" (1998)	"Hijo de la Luna" (1998)

The song was covered by the Dutch recording artist Loona. It was released in 1998 through Urban Records as the first single from her debut studio album, Lunita (1999). Loona's version uses a sample of Yazoo's hit "Don't Go" from 1982. The accompanying music video was directed by Wilfried Happel.

=== Track listings ===
1. "Bailando" (Energia-Mix short) – 3:33
2. "Bailando" (Energia-Mix extended version) – 5:29
3. "Bailando" (Besa Me-Mix extended version) – 4:54
4. "Noche Linda" – 3:57

=== Charts ===
==== Weekly charts ====
Chart (1998)	Peak position
Austria (Ö3 Austria Top 40)	3
Europe (Eurochart Hot 100)	7
Germany (GfK)	1
Netherlands (Dutch Top 40)	13
Netherlands (Single Top 100)	14
Switzerland (Schweizer Hitparade)	1

==== Year-end charts ====
Chart (1998)	Rank
Austria (Ö3 Austria Top 40)	14
Germany (Media Control)	9
Netherlands (Dutch Top 40)	100
Netherlands (Single Top 100)	82
Switzerland (Schweizer Hitparade)	8

=== Certifications ===
Region	Certification	Certified units/sales
Austria (IFPI Austria)	Gold	25,000^{*}
Germany (BVMI)	Platinum	500,000^{^}
Switzerland (IFPI Switzerland)	Gold	25,000^{^}
^{*} Sales figures based on certification alone.^{^} Shipments figures based on certification alone.

=== 2018 redux ===
Loona released a redux in 2018, mixed by Grzegorz Tarnik aka DJ Combo, released by World 2 Media. The video directed by Doug Laurent features her daughter Saphira and a niece, Julia.

=== Other versions ===
In 1999, American freestyle singer Angelina recorded a cover of the song and released it as the lead single from her second studio album "Ven a Mi (Come To Me)".

== See also ==
- List of number-one hits of 1997 (Denmark)
- List of number-one singles of 1997 (Finland)
- List of number-one hits (Italy)
- List of number-one songs in Norway
- List of number-one singles and albums in Sweden
- List of number-one hits of 1998 (Germany)
- List of number-one singles of the 1990s (Switzerland)
