= 3 Man Island =

English electronic music band

- Also known as: Three Man Island
- Origin: London, England
- Genres: Electronic; house; synthpop; big beat
- Years active: 1987-1989
- Labels: Chrysalis, Urban Records, Grind Records
- Past members: Mike Whitford; Nigel Swanston; Tim Cox

3 Man Island were an English electronic music trio best known for their song "Jack the Lad" which charted in the United States and the United Kingdom. The band recorded three songs together. The songs are "Funkin' for the UK" (which featured the vocals of Carol Jiani), "Jack The Lad", and "Horror House". The band never released a full-length studio album.

== Singles ==
Year	Title	Chart positions		
Year	Title	Billboard Hot 100	Billboard Dance	UK
1988	"Funkin' for the UK"	-	44	-
1988	"Jack the Lad"	94	10	98
1989	"Horror House"	-	-	-
