= Urban Records =

German record label

Urban Records is a German record label subsidiary of Universal Music Group. The label was founded in 1993 by Sascha Basler as a sub-label of Polydor Germany. In 1994, Urban became a sub-label of Motor Music and in 1995 Urban was Germany's most successful dance label.

In 1999, Urban Records became part of Universal Records as a result of a merger between PolyGram-Universal and Universal Music GmbH. Universal decided to merge Urban/Universal Records with the rap label Def Jam Germany into the Urban Def Jam label group.

Artists who have recorded for Urban Records include Frank Ocean, The Weeknd, Dua Lipa, Ed Sheeran Ezhel, Pashanim, 2Bona, Joje, Ozan Çolakoğlu, Tarkan, Panjabi MC, Antique, Barcode Brothers, Zascha Moktan, 3 Man Island, and Shaft.

== See also ==
- List of record labels
