= Paradisio =

Belgian-Spanish eurodance group

- Origin: Liège, Belgium
- Genres: Eurodance
- Years active: 1994–1998; 1999–2003; 2009–2011
- Labels: Nippon Crown; Polygram; Universal Music
- Past members: Patrick Samoy; Raquel Rodgers Rodriguez; Luc Rigaux; María Isabel García Asensio; María del Río; Sandra De Gregorio; Shelby Díaz
- Website: http://www.paradisiobailando.com/ https://www.facebook.com/paradisiobailando

Paradisio was a Belgian Eurodance group formed in 1994. They only released one studio album under the now-defunct Border Breakers sublabel of Nippon Crown: titled Paradisio (also titled as Tarpeia), released in 1997 after its debut single "Bailando" became an international hit in the summer of 1996 and 1997; They disbanded briefly from 1998 to 1999, and again in 2003, but reunited in 2009, and in 2011 they recorded and released another album, titled Noche Caliente.

== Discography ==
=== Studio albums ===
Title	Details	Peak chart positions		Certifications (sales thresholds)
Title	Details	FIN	SWE	Certifications (sales thresholds)
Paradisio	Release date: November 1997; Label: Arcade Music Company/Nippon Crown; Formats: CD	18	54	FIN: Gold

=== Singles ===
Year	Title	Peak chart positions									Certifications (sales thresholds)	Album
Year	Title	BEL (Fl)	BEL (Wa)	DEN	FRA	FIN	NED	ITA	NOR	SWE	Certifications (sales thresholds)	Album
1995	"Un Clima Ideal"	42	17	—	—	—	—	—	—	—		Single only
1996	"Bailando"	2	8	1	4	1	25	3	1	1	BEL: Gold; DNK: Gold; NOR: 2× Platinum; SWE: 3× Platinum	Paradisio
1996	"Bandolero"	19	21	—	92	—	—	11	—	—		Paradisio
1997	"Vamos a la Discoteca"	20	18	—	18	3	—	9	6	3	NOR: Gold; SWE: Gold	Paradisio
1997	"Dime Como"	55	—	—	—	—	—	—	—	36		Paradisio
1998	"Paseo"	—	—	—	—	—	—	—	—	51		Paradisio
1999	"Samba Del Diablo"	59	—	—	—	—	—	—	—	—		Singles only
2000	"La Propaganda"	—	—	—	—	—	—	—	—	—		Singles only
2001	"Vamos a la Discoteca 2001" (featuring Alexandria)	—	—	—	—	—	—	—	—	—		Singles only
2003	"Luz de la Luna"	66	—	—	—	—	—	—	—	—		Singles only
2016	"Vamos a la Playa"	—	—	—	—	—	—	—	—	—		Singles only
"—" denotes releases that did not chart
