= The Ataris discography =

- Studio albums: 5
- Extended plays: 7
- Live albums: 2
- Singles: 7
- Video albums: 1
- Music videos: 7
- Promotional singles: 2

The discography of American pop punk band The Ataris consists of five studio albums, one live album, one video album, six extended plays, seven singles, two promotional singles and seven music videos.

== Albums ==
=== Studio albums ===
List of studio albums, with selected chart positions and certifications
Title	Album details	Peak chart positions							Sales	Certifications
Title	Album details	US	AUS	CAN	JPN	NED Alt.	UK	UK Indie	Sales	Certifications
Anywhere but Here	Released: April 29, 1997 (US); Label: Kung Fu (78763); Formats: CD, CS, DL, LP	—	—	—	—	—	—	—		
Blue Skies, Broken Hearts...Next 12 Exits	Released: April 13, 1999 (US); Label: Kung Fu (78769); Formats: CD, CS, DL, LP	—	—	—	—	—	—	—		
End Is Forever	Released: February 20, 2001 (US); Label: Kung Fu (78782); Formats: CD, DL, LP	—	81	—	—	—	—	42		
So Long, Astoria	Released: March 4, 2003 (US); Label: Columbia (CK 86184); Formats: CD, CS, DL, LP	24	38	36	45	11	92	—	US: 693,000	RIAA: Gold
Welcome the Night	Released: February 20, 2007 (US); Label: Sanctuary (06076-84794); Formats: CD, DL, LP	85	—	84	68	—	198	8		
"—" denotes a recording that did not chart or was not released in that territory.

=== Compilation albums ===
List of compilation albums
Title	Album details
Silver Turns to Rust	Released: June 16, 2017 (US); Label: funk turry funk; Formats: CD, DL, LP

=== Live albums ===
List of live albums
Title	Album details
Live at the Metro	Released: February 24, 2004 (US); Label: Columbia; Formats: CD, DL
Live in Chicago 2019	Released: March 21, 2020

=== Video albums ===
List of video albums
Title	Album details
Live at Capitol Milling	Released: July 1, 2003 (US); Label: Columbia Music Video (CVD 55810); Formats: DVD

=== Extended plays ===
List of extended plays
Title	Album details
Hawaii 1985 (with Junglefish)	Released: 1996 (AUS); Label: Square Root (SRR 013); Formats: 7" vinyl
Look Forward to Failure	Released: November 10, 1998 (US); Label: Fat (FAT 581); Formats: CD
Wrists of Fury (with Douglas)	Released: 2000 (UK); Label: Speedowax (ATOM016); Formats: 7" vinyl
Let It Burn (with Useless ID)	Released: April 11, 2000 (US); Label: Kung Fu (78779); Formats: CD
All You Can Ever Learn Is What You Already Know	Released: 2002 (US); Label: Kung Fu (KFU78810); Formats: CD
All Souls' Day & the Graveyard of the Atlantic	Released: November 25, 2010 (US); Label: Paper + Plastick (PP0071); Formats: DL, 7" vinyl
October in This Railroad Earth	Released: June 25, 2016; Label: Self-released; Formats: DL

== Singles ==
List of singles, with selected chart positions, showing year released and album name
Title	Year	Peak chart positions										Certifications	Album
Title	Year	US	US Alt.	US Pop	AUS	CAN	GER	NZ	SCO	SWI	UK	Certifications	Album
"In This Diary"	2003	—	11	—	—	95	—	—	—	—	—		So Long, Astoria
"The Boys of Summer"	2003	20	2	10	24	—	45	17	45	87	49	RIAA: Gold; BPI: Silver; RMNZ: Gold	So Long, Astoria
"The Saddest Song"	2003	—	27	—	—	—	—	—	—	—	—		So Long, Astoria
"Not Capable of Love"	2006	—	—	—	—	—	—	—	—	—	—		Welcome the Night
"And We All Become Like Smoke"	2007	—	—	—	—	—	—	—	—	—	—		Welcome the Night
"—" denotes a recording that did not chart or was not released in that territory.

=== Promotional singles ===
List of promotional singles, showing year released and album name
Title	Year	Album
"Takeoffs and Landings"	2003	Live at Capitol Milling
"A New England"	2003	Live at the Metro

== Compilation appearances ==
List of non-single guest appearances, showing year released and album name
Title	Year	Album
"The Radio Still Sucks"	1999	Short Music for Short People
"Looking Back on Today" (acoustic)	2001	Warped Tour 2001 Tour Compilation
"Butterfly" (Weezer cover)	2002	Rock Music: A Tribute to Weezer
"Pretty Pathetic" (Smoking Popes cover)	2003	Smoking Popes Tribute
"I Remember You" (Skid Row cover)	2003	Punk Goes Metal
"Eight of Nine" (acoustic)	2003	Punk Goes Acoustic
"Science Fiction Double Feature (Reprise)"	2003	Rocky Horror Punk Rock Show
"Heaven Is Falling" (Bad Religion cover)	2004	Rock Against Bush, Vol. 1
"The Night That the Lights Went Out in NYC"	2004	Music from and Inspired by Spider-Man 2

== Music videos ==
List of music videos, showing year released and director
Title	Year	Director(s)
"Teenage Riot"	2001	Joe Escalante
"San Dimas High School Football Rules"	2001	Leif Stoehr
"Summer Wind Was Always Our Song"	2001	Joe Escalante
"In This Diary"	2003	Steven Murashige
"The Boys of Summer"	2003	Steven Murashige
"The Saddest Song"	2003	Steven Murashige
"Not Capable of Love"	2006	
"Car Song"	2025	Eric Cannon
