= DJ Sammy at Work (In the Mix) =

DJ Sammy At Work (In the Mix)

Remix album by DJ Sammy
- Released: 1998
- Genre: Dance
- Producer: DJ Sammy

DJ Sammy chronology
Life Is Just a Game (1998)	DJ Sammy At Work (In the Mix) (1998)	Heaven (2002)

DJ Sammy At Work (In the Mix) is the first remix album by DJ Sammy. It was released in 1998.

== Track listing ==
CD 1

1. Mellow Trax — "Phuture Vibes" (Original Version)
2. Pulsedriver — "Something For Your Mind"
3. Arrakis — "The Spice" (To Short Cut)
4. WestBam — "The Roof Is On Fire"
5. Mosquito Headz — "El Ritmo" (DJ Tandu Mix)
6. Green Court — "Moonflight" (Original Mix)
7. Fridge — "Paradise" (Nu Gray Mix)
8. Binary Finary — "1999" (Kay Cee Remix)
9. Gian Piero — "Children 2000" (Official Bootleg Mix)
10. York — "The Awakening" (Extended Mix)
11. Bacon Popper — "Rejoice In Love" (Aohh! Mix)
12. Lustral — "Everytime" (Nalin & Kane Mix)
13. Adrima — "Living On A Fantasy" (DJ Sammy Mix)
14. K(2) — "Waveshaper"
15. DJ Sammy feat. Charsima — "In 2 Eternity" (Dop Mix)
16. Condor — "Sky" (Moon Mix)

CD 2

1. Salt 'N' Pepa — "Push It (Again)" (DJ Tonka Remix)
2. Da Klubb Kings — "Don't Stop" (Klubb Mix)
3. Porno D.J. — "The Judgement"
4. Mac Zimms — "The Saxshop"
5. Silvio Ecomo — "Uprising"
6. DJ Antoine — "The Disco Bassline" (Pumpin' Groove Mix)
7. Rhythm Inc. — "Pumpin' It Up"
8. Bas Molendyk — "Day And Night"
9. Nature — "Trumpet Gun"
10. Rhythm Masters — "Deep In The Jungle"
11. Eddie Amador — "House Music" (Message Mix)
12. Dance or Die — "1, 2, 3, 4"
13. Bedlam — "Da-Force"
14. Nature — "Blue Ocean"
15. Invisible Man — "Give A Little Love"
16. King R — "Great Mountain"
17. Mac Zimms — "Sound Of Soul"
18. Primeval — "Run To Me"
