= So Long, Astoria =

2003 album by The Ataris

Studio album by The Ataris
- Released: March 4, 2003
- Recorded: August 19 – November 1, 2002
- Studios: Ocean, Burbank, California; Grandmaster, Hollywood, California; Orange Whip, Santa Barbara, California
- Genre: Pop-punk
- Length: 48:55
- Label: Columbia
- Producers: Lou Giordano; Thom Flowers; Elissa Meihsner; Eric Palmquist

The Ataris chronology
End Is Forever (2001)	So Long, Astoria (2003)	Welcome the Night (2007)

Singles from So Long, Astoria
- 1. "In This Diary" Released: February 11, 2003; 2. "The Boys of Summer" Released: June 3, 2003; 3. "The Saddest Song" Released: September 9, 2003

So Long, Astoria is the fourth studio album and the major-label debut studio album by American rock band The Ataris, released on March 4, 2003, through Columbia Records. The album's title song alludes to the 1985 film The Goonies, which is set in Astoria, Oregon.

== Background ==
In February 2001, The Ataris released their third album End Is Forever through independent label Kung Fu Records. In May, vocalist/guitarist Kris Roe revealed that the group would start writing for their next album later in the year. In June, guitarist Marco Peña left the group due to creative and personal differences. He was replaced by their guitar tech John Collura, formerly of the band Beefcake. Roe said Collura "definitely brought us back to [being the] best of friends", as well making them "realize that this band has got a lot of life in it". Also in June, the group contributed a new track to the Warped Tour 2001 compilation, "Looking Back on Today". The band signed with major label Columbia Records in July. Roe explained: "We wanted to go somewhere where we knew that even if our record didn't do well, that we would have a career still as a band".

Later in July, Roe revealed that the group would be releasing their next album in mid-2002 and that it would be in the musical style of their second album Blue Skies, Broken Hearts...Next 12 Exits (1999). In October, Roe said the album was tentatively titled Don't Ever Compromise What You Believe. In December, the group said they had 13 songs that they were working on, and were planning to record in March 2002. In January 2002, the group contributed a new song to the Orange County soundtrack. In April, Roe said the group were expected to begin recording in May. When looking for producers, bassist Mike Davenport said a few names came up: "Lou [Giordano] was always my choice. Ric Ocasek said [']I don't get it.' Mark Trombino told us to keep writing." Davenport pushed for Giordano, "and the minute [Roe and Giordano] spoke, it worked." In early July, Roe said the album would be titled So Long, Astoria. Later that month, Giordano was enlisted as the album's producer and that recording would finally occur in August.

== Recording ==
Demos were initially tracked at drummer Chris Knapp's house in Hollywood, California. Roe said they "never got anything done" and subsequently went to Orange Whip Recording in Santa Barbara, California to record more demos. With the aid of Angus Cooke and Thom Flowers, demos were recorded live-in-the-studio with minimal overdubs. Roe said they spent "a lot of time fine tuning" the songs before the album sessions. He added that the demos "capture[d] a certain honesty" and toyed with releasing the demos in lieu of recording a proper album. The group went into pre-production with Giordano, despite him thinking that the songs were "already pretty complete '"as is'", according to Roe. Recording began on August 19 and ended on November 1. Sessions took place at Ocean Studios in Burbank, California, Grandmaster Recorders in Hollywood, California and Orange Whip Recording.

Giordano produced all of the songs except for "Looking Back on Today", which was produced by Thom Flowers, Elissa Meihsner and Eric Palmquist. Bradley Cooke, Andrew Alekel and Flowers acted as engineers with assistance from Jason Nelson, Dean Cupp and Dave Ashton. Giordano mixed all of the songs, except for "The Saddest Song" and "My Reply", at Larrabee Studios in Hollywood, California. "The Saddest Song" and "My Reply" were mixed by Jack Joseph Puig. Additional tracking was done by Angus Cooke and Meihsner at Orange Whip Recording, while additional tracking was done by Ashton at Larrabee Studios. Several other people contributed to the album: James Muhawi (piano on "The Saddest Song"), Angus Cooke (cello), Jonathan Cox (programming), and Glen Phillips of Toad the Wet Sprocket, Mike Herrera of MxPx and Tim Pagnotta of Sugarcult (backing vocals).

== Composition ==
Early in the writing process for the record, Roe found a book that gave him the theme for the album. The book, which was Go Now by Richard Hell, contained a chapter "where he had a quote that said memories are better than life ... I wanted this record to portray, that life is only as good as the memories we make." Roe said the group "focus[ed] on writing good songs [and] straightforward rock songs". Musically, the album's sound has been described as pop punk, pop rock, punk rock, rock, and scene music, drawing comparison to Blink-182, Green Day, Good Charlotte, New Found Glory, Lit and A, with Roe sounding like A frontman Jason Perry. All of the songs were written by Roe, except for "The Hero Dies in This One" and "All You Can Ever Learn Is What You Already Know" by Roe, Collura, Davenport and Knapp, and "The Boys of Summer" by Don Henley and Michael Campbell.

"So Long, Astoria" is about Roe writing songs in his bedroom in Anderson, Indiana. The track was reminiscent of Matchbox Twenty; its name is a reference to the town Astoria, Oregon in the film The Goonies (1985). "Takeoffs and Landings" deals with saying goodbye to a long-distance partner. "In This Diary", alongside "Summer '79" talk about nights out in town and pulling pranks. Discussing "In This Diary", Roe said he attempted to "encapsulate one of the most fun summers we’ve had". Roe wrote "My Reply" about a fan who was in a hospital and close to death. "Unopened Letter to the World" details the life of American poet Emily Dickinson. "The Saddest Song" is about Roe's relationship with his estranged daughter and his upbringing without a father.

"Summer '79" sees Roe reminiscing on days when spent as a teenager sneaking into drive-in theatres and listening to Queen. "The Hero Dies in This One" refers to past girlfriends that had been left behind. Collura said "The Boys of Summer" was included due to Roe's nostalgia for it, and "it just kind of fit into the rest of the record." He altered one line, switching a reference from Deadhead to Black Flag. "Radio #2" was indebted to "Radio" by Teenage Fanclub. Roe wrote "Looking Back on Today" about his wife, and called it the sole relationship-centric song on the album. Roe said "Eight of Nine" is about a number of "really close calls that we've had with death."

== Release ==
In October 2002, it was announced that So Long, Astoria would be released in March 2003. On January 12, the group posted the songs "Takeoffs and Landings" and "In This Diary" online. "In This Diary" was released to radio on February 11. So Long, Astoria was released on March 4 through Columbia Records. The Japanese version included the bonus tracks "A Beautiful Mistake" and "I Won't Spend Another Night Alone", an acoustic version of "The Saddest Song", and a cover of the Ramones song "Rock 'N' Roll High School". A music video for "In This Diary" was posted online on March 3, directed by Steven Murashige. Roe said the video was mainly crowd-focused as the group wanted to channel their stage performance and energy. On May 19, "In This Diary" was released as a CD single. It featured "A Beautiful Mistake", a demo of "Eight of Nine", a live version of "In This Diary", and "Rock 'N' Roll High School" as B-sides.

"My Reply" was set to be the group's next single, but "The Boys of Summer" was released to radio on June 3 instead. This was a result of the K-Rock and KROQ radio stations playing the track, with others following shortly after. Collura said the group did not want to release the track as a single. He added that they were naïve to assume it would be released as such, since it wasn't promoted as one, "That was all American radio doing that on its own". Roe revealed Columbia Records had warned the band about including the track on the album in the first place as there would be "a chance that somebody's going to put it out as a single". The video treatment for the song's music video, which was directed by Murashige, was initially intended for "My Reply" until it was adjusted for "The Boys of Summer". Roe said the video was about "the story of a darker summer" and features "a girl trying to let go of a lot of the things she had in the summer."

The Ataris released their first video album Live at Capitol Milling in July 2003, which featured the music video for "In This Diary" (directed by Marc Smerling), the making-of video, and live performances taken from music video shoot. In August, Davenport revealed a music video had been filmed for "My Reply", but was "so far from coming out". He added, "It's animated, and it's like A-ha meets White Stripes." On September 8, "The Boys of Summer" was released as a CD single. It featured live versions of "Takeoffs and Landings" and "Unopened Letter to the World", "A Beautiful Mistake" and an acoustic version of "In This Diary" as B-sides. "The Saddest Song" was released to radio on September 9. In February 2004, the band released the live album Live at the Metro, which had been recorded the previous October. In addition to the show, it featured acoustic renditions, one of which was from So Long, Astoria.

== Touring ==
In November and December 2002, the group went on a US tour with Sugarcult, Autopilot Off and Rufio. During the tour, the group premiered material from So Long, Astoria. In late December and January 2003, the group embarked on the Australian leg of the Kung Fu Records Tour with the Vandals. The day following the album's release, an in-store performance was held at a record store in Tempe, Arizona. However, due to 1,000 people showing up, the performance was moved to the Arizona State University campus. In mid-March, the band appeared on Total Request Live and Late Night with Conan O'Brien. Following this, they toured with the Juliana Theory and Further Seems Forever on a two-month tour of the US. On May 8, the band appeared on The Late Late Show. In mid-June, the group performed at KROQ's Weenie Roast festival.

From June to August, the Ataris toured as part of the 2003 Warped Tour. On July 11, the group appeared on Jimmy Kimmel Live!. The group performed at the 2003 MLB All-Star Game in late July. In August and September, the band embarked on a European tour, with Matchbook Romance. In October and November 2003, the band embarked on the VW Music Ed Tour with Vendetta Red. In November, the group went on a US tour with Planes Mistaken for Stars, Vendetta Red, Hopesfall, The Go Reflex and Squirtgun. The group appeared on The Late Late Show and The Tonight Show on December 1 and December 29, respectively. In February and March 2004, the group went on a UK tour with Planes Mistaken for Stars and Cursive. In April, the group went on a tour of Canada. In May, the group co-headlined the RiverFusion festival with Something Corporate. They then played a few shows with the National Trust, which consisted of Roe and Matt Hart of Squirtgun, and appeared at Hellfest.

== Reception ==
Professional ratings
Aggregate scores
Source	Rating
Metacritic	57/100
Review scores
Source	Rating
AllMusic	3/5 stars
CMJ New Music Report	Favorable
Exclaim!	Favorable
Ink 19	Unfavorable
Melodic	3.5/5 stars
The Morning Call	Mixed
PopMatters	Favorable
Punknews.org	3.5/5 stars
Rolling Stone	2/5 stars
Sputnikmusic	4.0/5

=== Critical response ===
Initial critical response to So Long, Astoria was very average. At Metacritic, which assigns a normalized rating out of 100 to reviews from mainstream critics, the album has received an average score of 57, based on seven reviews.

=== Commercial performance and legacy ===
So Long, Astoria sold 33,000 in its first week, debuting at number 24 on the Billboard 200. It charted at number 38 in Australia and number 92 in the UK. "In This Diary" charted at number 11 on the Alternative Songs chart. "The Saddest Song" charted at number 27 on the Alternative Songs chart. "The Boys of Summer" charted at number two on the Alternative Songs chart, number 10 on the Mainstream Top 40 chart, number 18 on the Adult Top 40 chart, number 20 on the Hot 100 chart, number 22 on the Radio Songs chart, number 36 on the Mainstream Rock chart, in the US. It also charted at number 17 in New Zealand, number 24 in Australia, number 49 in the UK, and number 87 in Switzerland. In August, So Long, Astoria was certified gold in the US. By November, the album had sold 516,000 copies. In March 2006, "The Boys of Summer" was certified gold in the US. In December 2013, sales stood at 693,000 copies.

The album was included at number 25 on Rock Sound's "The 51 Most Essential Pop Punk Albums of All Time" list. They later ranked it at number 97 on the list of best albums in their lifetime. In December 2013, the band released demos that had been recorded for the album. In February and March 2014, the group performed the album in its entirety in the US. They were supported by Versus the World, Authority Zero, Drag the River and Gasoline Heart. To promote the tour, a short documentary was made in the style of VH1's music documentary series Classic Albums. In June 2016, the group performed in Australia, playing songs solely from Blue Skies, Broken Hearts...Next 12 Exits and So Long, Astoria. In February 2018, the group went on a celebratory 15th anniversary tour for the album in the UK.

== Track listing ==
All songs written by Kris Roe, except where noted.

No.	Title	Writer(s)	Length
1.	"So Long, Astoria"		3:22
2.	"Takeoffs and Landings"		3:56
3.	"In This Diary"		3:54
4.	"My Reply"		4:14
5.	"Unopened Letter to the World"		2:38
6.	"The Saddest Song"		4:15
7.	"Summer '79"		3:57
8.	"The Hero Dies in This One"	Roe, John Collura, Mike Davenport, Chris Knapp	4:07
9.	"All You Can Ever Learn Is What You Already Know"	Roe, Collura, Davenport, Knapp	3:31
10.	"The Boys of Summer"	Don Henley, Michael Campbell	4:18
11.	"Radio #2"		3:27
12.	"Looking Back on Today"		3:53
13.	"Eight of Nine"		3:30
14.	"I Won't Spend Another Night Alone" (hidden track)		3:50
15.	"The Saddest Song" (acoustic hidden track)		4:09
Total length:			48:55

Japanese bonus tracks
No.	Title	Writer(s)	Length
16.	"A Beautiful Mistake"		3:13
17.	"Rock 'N' Roll High School"	Joey Ramone, Dee Dee Ramone	2:17

== Personnel ==
Credits adapted from liner notes.

The Ataris

- Kris Roe – lead vocals, rhythm guitar, moog synthesizer, mellotron
- Mike Davenport – bass guitar
- John Collura – lead guitar, backing vocals
- Chris Knapp – drums

Additional musicians

- James Muhawi – piano (track 6)
- Angus Cooke – cello
- Johnathan Cox – programming
- Glen Phillips – backing vocals
- Mike Herrera – backing vocals
- Tim Pagnotta – backing vocals

Production

- Lou Giordano – producer, mixing
- Thom Flowers – producer (track 12), engineer
- Elissa Meihsner – producer (track 12), additional tracking
- Eric Palmquist – producer (track 12)
- Bradley Cooke – engineer
- Andrew Alekel – engineer
- Jason Nelson – assistant engineer
- Dean Cupp – assistant engineer
- Dave Ashton – assistant engineer, additional tracking
- Jack Joseph Puig – mixing (tracks 4 and 6)
- Angus Cooke – additional tracking

Artwork

- Danny Clinch – band photos
- Chuck Meyer – water tower photos
- Kris Roe – other art photos
- Sergie Loobkoff – art direction, design

== Charts ==
=== Weekly charts ===
Weekly chart performance
Chart (2003)	Peak position
Australian Albums (ARIA)	38
Canadian Albums (Nielsen SoundScan)	36
Dutch Alternative Albums (Alternative Top 30)	11
Japanese Albums (Oricon)	45
UK Albums (Official Charts)	92
US Billboard 200	24

=== Year-end charts ===
Year-end chart performance
Chart (2003)	Position
US Billboard 200	138

== Certifications ==
Certifications
Region	Certification	Certified units/sales
United States (RIAA)	Gold	500,000^{^}
^{^} Shipments figures based on certification alone.
