= Versus the World =

Versus the World may refer to:

- Versus the World (Amon Amarth album), 2002
- Versus the World (band), an alternative rock band
- Versus the World (Versus the World album), 2005
