= Phuture Vibes =

Single by Mellow Trax
- Released: 1999
- Recorded: 1999
- Songwriter(s): DJ Mellow-D
- Producer(s): DJ Mellow-D

"Phuture Vibes" is a 1999 single by Mellow Trax. It reached No. 15 on the Austrian Singles Chart.

== In popular culture ==
DJ Sammy kicks off his debut album DJ Sammy at Work (In the Mix) with this song.
