= You Need a Hug =

You Need a Hug may refer to:

- "You Need a Hug", 1994 episode of American claymation series Bump in the Night
- "You Need a Hug", song on American rock band The Ataris' 2001 album End Is Forever
