= DJ Mellow D =

DJ Mellow D is an alias used by the following artists:

- Terminator X, a retired American DJ best known for his work with rap group Public Enemy, which he left in 1999
- Christian Scharnweber, a DJ from Germany
