= Outa Space =

Single by Mellow Trax
- Released: 30 August 1999
- Recorded: 1999
- Studio: Polydor
- Songwriter: DJ Mellow-D
- Producer: DJ Mellow-D

Mellow Trax singles chronology
"Phuture Vibes" (1998)	"Outa Space" (1999)	"Mystery Vibes" (1999)

Outa Space is a song by German electronic producer and DJ Mellow Trax. Released in August 1999, the song reached No. 14 in Austria, No. 42 in Switzerland, No. 27 in France, No. 41 on the UK Singles Chart and No. 43 on the Hot Dance Music/Maxi-Singles Sales chart in the United States.

== Contents ==
The song samples Max Romeo's Chase the Devil.

== Charts ==
Chart (1999–2000)	Peak position
Austria (Ö3 Austria Top 40)	14
France (SNEP)	27
Germany (GfK)	10
Switzerland (Schweizer Hitparade)	42
UK Singles (OCC)	41
UK Dance (OCC)	14
US Dance Singles Sales (Billboard)	43
