= Heaven (DJ Sammy album) =

Studio album by DJ Sammy
- Released: 6 August 2002
- Recorded: 2001–2002
- Genre: Eurodance; techno; trance
- Label: Pulp (Germany); Robbins (US); Data (UK)
- Producer: DJ Sammy; Martin Eyerer; Andy Hoppe; Jaxon; Oliver Laib; Rubens Martinèz; Frank Reinert; Dirk Vanderbirk; Yanou

DJ Sammy chronology
DJ Sammy at Work (In the Mix) (1998)	Heaven (2002)	The Rise (2005)

Singles from Heaven
- 1. "Heaven" Released: 21 November 2001; 2. "Sunlight" Released: 15 May 2002; 3. "The Boys of Summer" Released: 18 November 2002

Professional ratings
Review scores
Source	Rating
AllMusic	2.5/5 stars
Rolling Stone	2/5 stars

Heaven is the second studio album by Spanish DJ and producer DJ Sammy. It was released on 6 August 2002.

== Singles ==
The title track and first single, "Heaven", is a cover of the Bryan Adams song of the same name, released on 21 November 2001. It was produced in a collaboration with German producer Yanou with vocals by Dutch singer Do.

The second single, "Sunlight", was released on 15 May 2002 with vocals by Loona.

The third single, "The Boys of Summer", released on 18 November 2002, also features vocals by Loona; it is a cover of the Don Henley song of the same name.

== Track listing ==
German edition
No.	Title	Producer(s)	Length
1.	"Sunlight"	DJ Sammy	3:58
2.	"California Dreamin'"	DJ Sammy; Martin Eyerer^{[a]}; Oliver Laib^{[a]}	4:30
3.	"Heaven" (with Yanou featuring Do)	DJ Sammy; Yanou; Frank Reinert^{[b]}	3:54
4.	"Beautiful Smile"	DJ Sammy; Eyerer^{[a]}; Laib^{[a]}	4:55
5.	"The Boys of Summer"	DJ Sammy; Eyerer^{[a]}; Laib^{[a]}	4:54
6.	"El Cóndor Pasa"	DJ Sammy; Eyerer^{[a]}; Laib^{[a]}	4:21
7.	"Paradise of Love"	DJ Sammy; Jaxon^{[a]}; Andy Hoppe^{[a]}	5:43
8.	"Unbreakable"	DJ Sammy; Dirk Vanderbirk^{[a]}; Rubens Martinèz^{[a]}	4:16
9.	"Vive el Presente"	DJ Sammy; Vanderbirk^{[a]}; Martinèz^{[a]}	4:09
10.	"Take Me Back to Heaven"	DJ Sammy; Vanderbirk^{[a]}; Martinèz^{[a]}; Ron van Kroonenburg^{[c]}	4:24
11.	"Sunchild"	DJ Sammy; Jaxon^{[a]}; Hoppe^{[a]}	6:09
12.	"Sunlight (Bossa Nova Vibes)"	DJ Sammy; Eyerer^{[a]}; Laib^{[a]}	3:20
13.	"Heaven (Candlelight mix)" (featuring Do)	DJ Sammy; Yanou; Reinert^{[b]}	4:02

Japanese edition bonus tracks
No.	Title	Producer(s)	Length
14.	"The Boys of Summer" (Green Court remix)	DJ Sammy; Eyerer^{[a]}; Laib^{[a]}; Green Court^{[c]}	8:09
15.	"Appalachian Fall"	DJ Sammy; Eyerer^{[a]}; Laib^{[a]}	7:23

UK edition
No.	Title	Producer(s)	Length
1.	"Sunlight"	DJ Sammy	3:59
2.	"Heaven" (DJ Sammy and Yanou featuring Do)	DJ Sammy; Yanou; Frank Reinert^{[b]}	3:53
3.	"Beautiful Smile"	DJ Sammy; Eyerer^{[a]}; Laib^{[a]}	4:55
4.	"The Boys of Summer"	DJ Sammy; Eyerer^{[a]}; Laib^{[a]}	4:55
5.	"El Cóndor Pasa"	DJ Sammy; Eyerer^{[a]}; Laib^{[a]}	4:21
6.	"Paradise of Love"	DJ Sammy; Jaxon^{[a]}; Andy Hoppe^{[a]}	4:05
7.	"Unbreakable"	DJ Sammy; Dirk Vanderbirk^{[a]}; Rubens Martinèz^{[a]}	4:15
8.	"Irresistible"	DJ Sammy; Eyerer^{[a]}; Laib^{[a]}	5:23
9.	"Take Me Back to Heaven"	DJ Sammy; Vanderbirk^{[a]}; Martinèz^{[a]}; Ron van Kroonenburg^{[c]}	4:24
10.	"Appalachian Fall"	DJ Sammy; Eyerer^{[a]}; Laib^{[a]}	4:17
11.	"Heaven (Candlelight mix)" (featuring Do)	DJ Sammy; Yanou; Reinert^{[b]}	8:43

US edition
No.	Title	Producer(s)	Length
1.	"California Dreamin'"	DJ Sammy; Martin Eyerer^{[a]}; Oliver Laib^{[a]}	4:30
2.	"Heaven" (DJ Sammy and Yanou featuring Do)	DJ Sammy; Yanou; Frank Reinert^{[b]}	3:54
3.	"Sunlight"	DJ Sammy	3:58
4.	"The Boys of Summer"	DJ Sammy; Eyerer^{[a]}; Laib^{[a]}	4:54
5.	"El Cóndor Pasa"	DJ Sammy; Eyerer^{[a]}; Laib^{[a]}	4:21
6.	"Beautiful Smile"	DJ Sammy; Eyerer^{[a]}; Laib^{[a]}	4:55
7.	"Unbreakable"	DJ Sammy; Dirk Vanderbirk^{[a]}; Rubens Martinèz^{[a]}	4:16
8.	"Paradise of Love"	DJ Sammy; Jaxon^{[a]}; Andy Hoppe^{[a]}	5:43
9.	"Vive el Presente"	DJ Sammy; Vanderbirk^{[a]}; Martinèz^{[a]}	4:09
10.	"Take Me Back to Heaven"	DJ Sammy; Vanderbirk^{[a]}; Martinèz^{[a]}; Ron van Kroonenburg^{[c]}	4:24
11.	"Sunchild"	DJ Sammy; Jaxon^{[a]}; Hoppe^{[a]}	6:09
12.	"Sunlight (Bossa Nova Vibes)"	DJ Sammy; Eyerer^{[a]}; Laib^{[a]}	3:20
13.	"Heaven (Candlelight mix)" (featuring Do)	DJ Sammy; Yanou; Reinert^{[b]}	4:02

Notes

- ^{^[a]} signifies a co-producer.
- ^{^[b]} signifies an assistant producer.
- ^{^[c]} signifies a remixer.
- The UK edition includes "California Dreamin'" as a hidden track appended to the end of track 11.

== Personnel ==
Vocalists

- Loona – vocals ("Sunlight", "California Dreamin'", "Beautiful Smile", "The Boys of Summer", "Sunlight (Bossa Nova Vibes)")
- Do – vocals ( "Heaven", "Heaven (Candlelight mix)")
- Mel – vocals ("The Boys of Summer")
- Sitanshu Dasti – vocals ("El Cóndor Pasa")
- Michelle Tabu – vocals ("Unbreakable")
- DiCaprio – vocals ("Vive el Presente")
- Vanda Guzman – vocals ("Take Me Back to Heaven")
- Annabell Owusu-Ansah – backing vocals (Sunlight", "California Dreamin'", "Sunlight (Bossa Nova Vibes)")
- Phil Barnes – vocals ("Irresistible")

== Charts ==
=== Weekly charts ===
Chart performance for Heaven
Chart (2002–2003)	Peak position
Australian Albums (ARIA)	64
Finnish Albums (Suomen virallinen lista)	30
New Zealand Albums (RMNZ)	10
Swedish Albums (Sverigetopplistan)	24
UK Albums (OCC)	14
US Billboard 200	67
US Top Dance/Electronic Albums (Billboard)	1

=== Year-end charts ===
Year-end chart performance for Heaven
Chart (2003)	Position
UK Albums (OCC)	198

== Certifications ==
Certifications for Heaven
Region	Certification	Certified units/sales
New Zealand (RMNZ)	Gold	7,500^{^}
United Kingdom (BPI)	Gold	100,000^{^}
^{^} Shipments figures based on certification alone.
