= Life Is Just a Game =

Studio album by DJ Sammy
- Released: June 29, 1998
- Recorded: 1995–1998
- Genre: Eurotrance/dance
- Label: Universal

DJ Sammy chronology
Life Is Just a Game (1998)	DJ Sammy At Work (1998)

Singles from Life Is Just a Game
- 1. "Life Is Just a Game" Released: November 7, 1995; 2. "You're My Angel" Released: March 18, 1996; 3. "Prince of Love" Released: April 19, 1997; 4. "Golden Child" Released: October 27, 1997; 5. "Magic Moment" Released: April 18, 1998

Life Is Just a Game is the debut studio album by Eurodance duo DJ Sammy and Carisma. It was released on June 29, 1998. As of December 1999, it had sold over 200,000 units and was especially popular in Europe and Mexico.

== Track listing ==
No.	Title	Length
1.	"Intro" (featuring Carisma)	3:15
2.	"Prince of Love" (featuring Carisma)	3:29
3.	"Golden Child" (featuring Carisma)	3:40
4.	"Sueño Complido"	5:40
5.	"Magic Moment" (featuring Carisma)	3:44
6.	"Find a Way" (featuring Carisma)	3:39
7.	"Allegria"	6:00
8.	"You Can Run" (featuring Carisma)	5:49
9.	"Wait" (featuring Carisma)	5:29
10.	"Life Is Just a Game" (featuring Carisma)	3:52
11.	"You're My Angel" (featuring Carisma)	3:58

Bonus track
No.	Title	Length
12.	"Prince of Love (Acapella)" (featuring Carisma)	2:54
13.	"Golden Child (Acapella)" (featuring Carisma)	3:02
14.	"Bruce Lee" (featuring Chan)	4:23
15.	"Outro" (featuring Carisma and Chan)	1:25
16.	"Bailando" (Loona)	3:33

== Reception ==
In an article in Vice, Tom Glencross wrote, "whether you're a fan of Eurotrance or not, there's no denying how much fun this music is, and as the product of the ultimate holiday romance, the chemistry between Sammy and Carisma both as lovers and performers is electrifying. It is a record of unbound joy, of Balearic fantasy, of young love, of hearts racing at 140 beats per minute, and if you don't believe me, just take a look at the album artwork."
