= Mike Davenport =

American musician

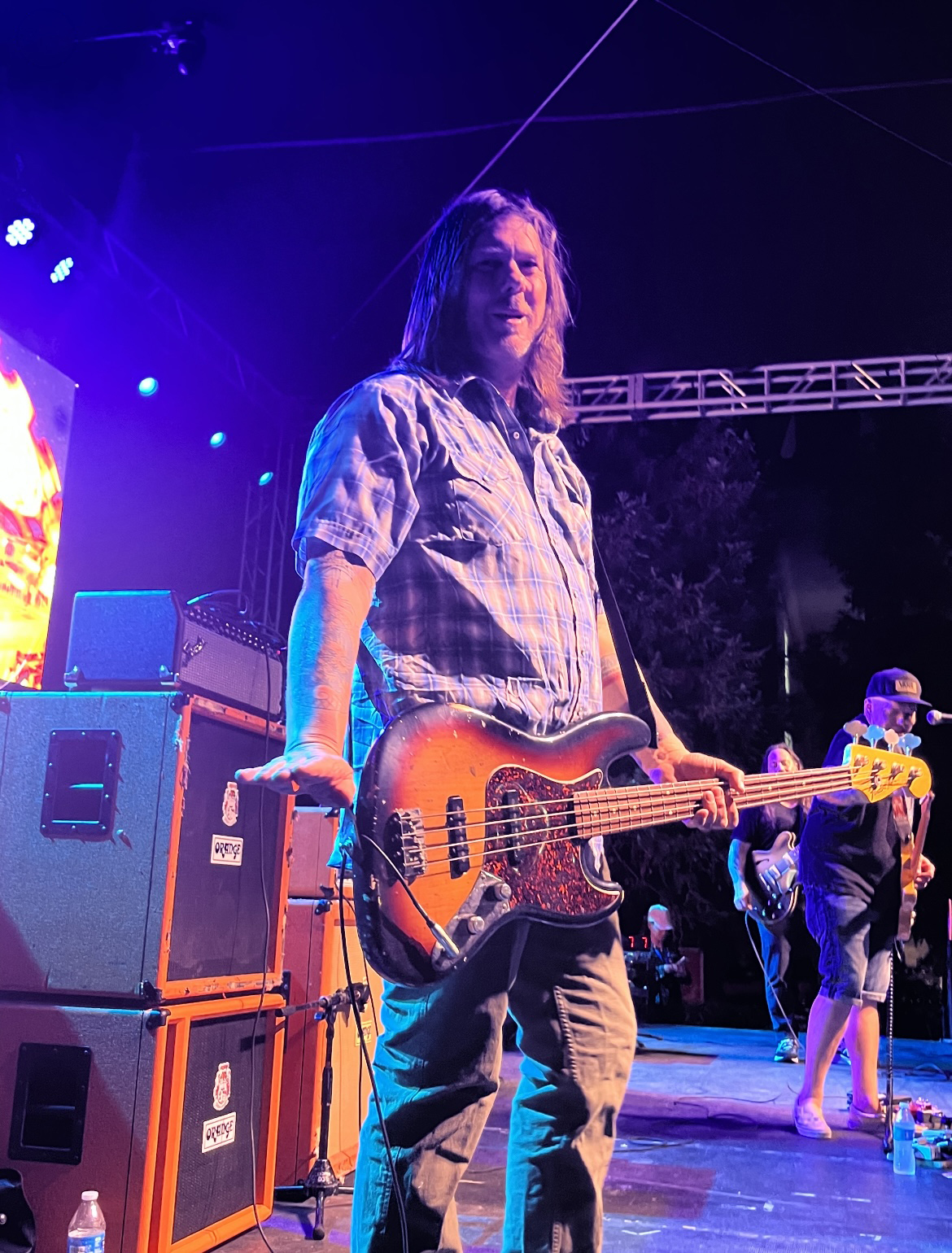

Background information
- Born: Michael Sean Davenport; September 13, 1968 (age 57)
- Genres: Punk rock, hardcore punk, pop punk
- Occupations: Musician, songwriter, vocalist
- Instruments: Bass, guitar, backing vocals
- Years active: 1990–present
- Labels: Fat Wreck Chords, Kung Fu, Columbia Records, Sony Records

Michael Sean Davenport (born 13 September 1968) is an American musician. Davenport is bass guitarist for The Ataris, joining the band in 1997 prior to the album Blue Skies, Broken Hearts...Next 12 Exits in which Davenport co-wrote the song "In Spite of the World". He also played bass on the album End Is Forever and the EP Look Forward to Failure on Fat Wreck Chords. After numerous recordings, tours, and a major label release with The Ataris, So Long Astoria in which he co-wrote the song "The Hero Dies in this One" about his father Francis Jay Davenport, who died in a car accident in Santa Barbara county when Davenport was 19 years old. Davenport played bass on Live at the Metro. In 2005, Davenport left the band after the Ataris headed in a different musical direction. In 2005, Davenport appeared in the documentary movie Punk's Not Dead.

Davenport went on to form the band Versus the World with the employees of The Ataris record store Down on Haley. Versus the World put out a self-titled album on Kung Fu Records in 2005. The album featured a top twenty hit in Europe. The band toured extensively through the US, Canada, and Europe. Their song "Forgive Me" is featured on WWE SmackDown vs. Raw 2007. They have also made a music video for one of their songs "Is There No End.

Davenport began to play with friends Brian McVicar on drums and Chris Flippin on Guitar and formed Cave Mummy in 2008.

Davenport rejoined The Ataris from 2014-2016 for two reunion tours in the U.S., Europe, and Australia. He joined The Ataris again in 2023 and remains in the band as of 2025.

== Legal problems ==
Davenport was indicted in December 2017 on federal conspiracy to commit fraud charges while operating a nationwide telemarketing real estate company that was active between 2009 and 2016.

More than $104,000 in cash was seized from Davenport when he was arrested in December 2017 at the Clinton National Airport in Little Rock, Arkansas. Another $850,000 in his personal bank accounts were also seized.

Davenport pleaded guilty in September 2018 to a one-count federal indictment charging him with conspiracy to commit mail and wire fraud. He was sentenced on March 6, 2019 to serve 7 years in Federal Prison Camp. Davenport was released on home confinement on April 21, 2021. As part of his sentence, he was ordered to forfeit $853,210.11 that was recovered from his credit card processing accounts, as well as $79,000 in cash that was also seized.

== Personal life ==
After being released from Federal Prison Camp, Michael received an Associate's Degree in Psychology from Allan Hancock College in 2022 and a Bachelor's Degree in Psychology from Cal State Northridge in 2024.
