= In This Diary =

Single by the Ataris

from the album So Long, Astoria
- Released: February 11, 2003
- Genre: Pop-punk
- Length: 3:54
- Label: Columbia
- Songwriter: Kris Roe

The Ataris singles chronology
"Summer Wind Was Always Our Song" (2001)	"In This Diary" (2003)	"The Boys of Summer" (2003)

"In This Diary" is a song recorded by American pop punk group the Ataris. It was released in February 2003 as the lead single from their fourth album So Long, Astoria. "In This Diary" was released to radio on February 11, 2003. It peaked at number 11 on the U.S. Billboard Modern Rock Tracks chart. The song can be heard in the closing credits of the 2004 film The Perfect Score.

== Music video ==
The accompanying music video shows the Ataris playing live, and was recorded at Capitol Milling in California. This shoot was later made into a live DVD, Live at Capitol Milling.

== Chart performance ==
Chart (2003)	Peak position
U.S. Billboard Modern Rock Tracks	11
