= Sunlight (DJ Sammy song) =

2002 single by DJ Sammy

Single by DJ Sammy featuring Loona

from the album Heaven
- Released: 15 May 2002
- Length: 3:59
- Label: Vale Music
- Songwriters: DJ Sammy; Marie-José van der Kolk; Martin Eyerer; Oliver Laib
- Producer: DJ Sammy

DJ Sammy singles chronology
"Heaven" (2001)	"Sunlight" (2002)	"The Boys of Summer" (2002)

"Sunlight" is a song written and produced by Spanish disc jockey DJ Sammy with vocals provided by Dutch singer Loona. It was released in May 2002 as the second single off DJ Sammy's second studio album, Heaven (2002), and reached number eight in the United Kingdom, number 21 in Ireland, and number 28 in the Netherlands.

== Music videos ==
There were two videos made for the single. One video features time-lapse photography of locations around the world of people walking in urban areas, traffic, clouds drifting on mountains, and waves on a beach. The other video features time-lapse photography of Palma de Mallorca and Loona singing on the beach.

== Track listings ==
Spanish maxi-CD single

1. "Sunlight" (sunrise mix) – 3:59
2. "Sunlight" (sunset mix) – 5:22
3. "Sunlight" (DJ Shog remix) – 7:46
4. "Sunlight" (Martin Eyerer remix) – 9:56
5. "Sunlight" (Minimalistix remix) – 7:34
6. "Sunlight" (Oliver Lieb remix) – 5:08
7. "Sunlight" (sunset mix instrumental) – 5:08
8. "Sunlight" (bossa nova vibes) – 3:18

UK CD single

1. "Sunlight" (radio edit)
2. "Sunlight" (Milky remix edit)
3. "Heaven" (Yanou's Candlelight mix)
4. "Sunlight" (video)

UK cassette single

1. "Sunlight" (radio edit)
2. "Sunlight" (Milky remix edit)

Australian CD single

1. "Sunlight" (sunrise mix) – 4:00
2. "Sunlight" (bossa nova vibes) – 3:19
3. "Sunlight" (sunset mix) – 5:22
4. "Sunlight" (DJ Shog remix) – 7:48
5. "Sunlight" (Minimalistix remix) – 7:35
6. "Sunlight" (Oliver Lieb remix) – 7:47

== Charts ==
=== Weekly charts ===
Chart (2002–2003)	Peak position
Australia (ARIA)	40
Austria (Ö3 Austria Top 40)	58
Belgium (Ultratip Bubbling Under Flanders)	12
Europe (Eurochart Hot 100)	29
Germany (GfK)	50
Ireland (IRMA)	21
Ireland Dance (IRMA)	3
Netherlands (Dutch Top 40)	28
Netherlands (Single Top 100)	62
New Zealand (Recorded Music NZ)	46
Scottish Singles Sales (Official Charts)	6
UK Singles (Official Charts)	8
UK Dance (Official Charts)	7

=== Year-end charts ===
Chart (2003)	Position
UK Singles (OCC)	173

== Release history ==
Region	Date	Format(s)	Label(s)	Ref.
Europe	15 May 2002	CD	Digidance; Urban	
United Kingdom	9 June 2003	12-inch vinyl; CD; cassette	Data	
