= Rise Again (DJ Sammy song) =

Single by DJ Sammy/Loona

from the album The Rise
- Released: August 27, 2004
- Recorded: 2003
- Genre: Trance Dance music
- Length: 3:20
- Label: Central Station
- Songwriters: DJ Sammy; Loona; Martin Eyerer; Oliver Laib
- Producers: Martin Eyerer; Oliver Leib

DJ Sammy/Loona singles chronology
"The Boys of Summer" (2002)	"Rise Again" (2004)	"Why" (2005)

Rise Again is a song co-written and recorded by DJ Sammy with vocals by Loona. It was released in August 2004 as the first single from the album The Rise. The beginning of the song samples the beginning of "Where the Streets Have No Name" by U2. The song was used in the soundtrack in 2004 film It's All Gone Pete Tong.

== Music video ==
Featuring DJ Sammy and Loona who was in the early stages of pregnancy in scenes with DJ Sammy walking in Palma de Mallorca, on a dock on the Mediterranean Sea, a vintage television set of Loona in a mountain valley and reflecting sunlight with a mirror into DJ Sammy's face from the TV set, Loona sitting in a filled bath fully clothed and DJ Sammy letting red and white balloons go into the sky. It ends with DJ Sammy walking down an aisle in Real Mallorca's Son Moix stadium where he is joined by Loona.

== Formats and track listings ==
These are the formats and track listings of major single releases of "Rise Again".

International CD single

1. "Rise Again" (Radio mix) – 3:42
2. "Rise Again" (Original vocal) – 7:27
3. "Rise Again" (Viframa remix) – 8:08
4. "Rise Again" (Martin Eyerer remix) – 7:46
5. "Rise Again" (Original instrumental) – 7:33

Vinyl single

1. "Rise Again" (Original vocal) – 7:27
2. "Rise Again" (Original instrumental) – 7:33
3. "Rise Again" (Viframa remix) – 8:08
4. "Rise Again" (Martin Eyerer remix) – 7:46

== Charts ==
Chart (2004)	Peak position
Germany (Media Control Charts)	53
Switzerland (Schweizer Hitparade)	88
