= Versus the World (band) =

American band

- Origin: Santa Barbara, California, United States
- Genres: Post-hardcore; pop punk; emo; alternative rock; punk rock
- Years active: 2005–present
- Labels: SBÄM Records; Kung Fu; Viking Funeral Records; Concrete Jungle Records
- Members: Donald Spence; Chris Flippin; Josh Sleeze; Tony Caraffa; Patrick Solem
- Past members: Mike Davenport; Nic Matsuda; Marco Peña; Trevor Lewis Matthias; Casey James Cress; Bryan Charlson; Sean Sellers

Versus the World is an American rock band from Santa Barbara, California, United States, formed by Donald Spence and Mike Davenport. The band combines post-hardcore with pop-punk and is currently signed to SBÄM Records. They released their debut album, Versus the World, in September 2005.

== History ==
Versus the World is a punk rock band from Santa Barbara, California, United States, on Kung Fu Records. The band combines post-hardcore with pop punk. They released their debut album, Versus the World, in September 2005. Mike Davenport was the longtime bassist from The Ataris. Versus The World formed in the back of The Ataris old record store (“Down On Haley”). Prior to being called Versus The World, Mike Davenport and Donald Spence did a few acoustic shows under the band name “Pencapchew” to fill time between their current projects. They have also made a music video for one of their song “Is There No End”. They toured the US and Europe rigorously with bands such as No Use For A Name, Suicide Machines, Bouncing Souls, The Lawrence Arms, Social Distortion, I Am The Avalanche, and the Vans Warped Tour. They also released a song entitled “Blue and Cold” on the Vans Warped Tour Taste of Christmas compilation, which was featured as a bonus track on European versions of the album.

In August 2010, VTW announced their return, with new members Chris Flippin of Lagwagon and Bryan Charlson of Spence's side band Crooks & Liars. They stated they were set to work on a new EP with an accompanying tour to follow. However, in 2011 the band announced that they had opted to release a full album instead. On July 30, 2011 a new song "In Fear of Finale" was released. It is the first new material from the band since the song "Blue and Cold". Later, on September 13, the band posted an acoustic preview of another song, titled "A Love Song for Amsterdam". In 2012, Versus the World embarked on a full scale European tour, including a date on the festival Groezrock. On April 25, 2012 the album was finally announced as "Drink. Sing. Live. Love." due to be released July 13 on Viking Funeral Records. On July 31, a music video for the track "A Fond Farewell" was put out to coincide with the album's US release.

In 2015 they released the third album, called Homesick/Roadsick.

In 2021 they returned to the studio with producer Cameron Webb of Mötorhead fame to record "The Bastards Live Forever," which is due out May 26, 2023 on SBÄM Records.

== Other media ==
The song "Forgive Me" was featured on the soundtrack for the video game WWE SmackDown vs. Raw 2007.

== Albums ==
Year	Title
2005	Versus the World
2012	Drink. Sing. Live. Love.
2015	Homesick/Roadsick
2023	The Bastards Live Forever
