= The Ataris =

American rock band

- Origin: Anderson, Indiana, U.S.
- Genres: Pop-punk; emo; punk rock; alternative rock
- Works: Discography
- Years active: 1996–present
- Labels: Cleopatra; Kung Fu; Columbia; Sanctuary
- Spinoff of: Park Ranger
- Members: Kristopher Roe; Mike Davenport; Chris Knapp; John Collura; Brian Bonsall; Dustin Phillips
- Past members: See Band members
- Website: theatarisband.com

The Ataris are an American punk rock band from Anderson, Indiana. Formed in 1996, they released five studio albums between 1997 and 2007. Their best-selling album is their major label debut album So Long, Astoria (2003), which was certified gold. Their high-charting single is their cover of Don Henley's "The Boys of Summer" from So Long, Astoria. The only constant member throughout their history has been singer/songwriter/guitarist Kristopher "Kris" Roe.

The staff of Consequence ranked the band at number 37 on their list of "The 100 Best Pop Punk Bands" in 2019. In 2025, Terry Bezer of Screen Rant stated the opinion that the band was underrated, referring to "In This Diary" as "one of the best pop-punk songs ever written."

== History ==
=== Kung Fu Records (1996–2001) ===
Formed on November 1, 1996, and with the band's name a reference to the large collection of Atari video game cartridges of Roe, the band originally consisted of singer, songwriter, and guitarist Kristopher Roe and guitarist Jasin Thomason. Using a 4-track, Roe wrote and recorded demos in his bedroom, using a drum machine while he searched for a full-time drummer. The band's first big break came in 1996 when Roe attended a show at the club Bogart's in Cincinnati, where Thomason passed one of the band's demo tapes to a roadie from the band. The roadie gave the tape to Joe Escalante, bassist from the band the Vandals who owned their own label, Kung Fu Records. A few weeks later, Roe received a call from Kung Fu Records, who told him they were interested in putting out their record, even though he was really only searching for a drummer. The Ataris signed to Kung Fu and the label passed the tape along to various drummers. Eventually, Roe decided upon ex-Lagwagon drummer Derrick Plourde. The band then proceeded to record their debut album Anywhere but Here, tracking the whole thing in less than a week. The album was released on April 29, 1997, and the band held a release show party at Missing Link Records in Indianapolis on May 2.

In June 1997, Roe moved from Anderson, Indiana to Santa Barbara, California. Shortly afterward, Marko Desantis joined the band on bass for a short time. Thomason decided to leave the band to stay in Indiana, and the group toured as a three-piece for a short while. After a brief tour in October 1997, this lineup disbanded. Roe, out of money and living in a van, contemplated moving back to Indiana. But the band still had an upcoming tour booked with Dance Hall Crashers and Unwritten Law, so Roe decided to give the band one more shot. He got his friend from Santa Barbara, Mike Davenport, to play bass. Davenport shared a small rehearsal space on East Haley Street with his friend Marco Peña, who was in a different band. One day at the rehearsal space, Roe and Davenport heard the drummer of Peña's band, Chris Knapp, playing and immediately asked him to join the Ataris. While Roe and Davenport joked that Peña would be upset over them "stealing" his band's drummer, Peña surprised them by showing up at their practice the next day, strapping on his guitar, and playing along. It turned out Peña had learned all the songs from Anywhere But Here. He joined the band as a second guitarist and the foursome went on their scheduled tour. However, Peña soon left the band for personal reasons and was replaced by Patrick Riley.

From there, the band gradually increased in popularity in the underground rock scene due to their consistent touring and personal, DIY approach to the band. They then found more success with their 1998 EP Look Forward to Failure, released on San Francisco punk label Fat Wreck Chords. However, it wasn't until the release of Blue Skies, Broken Hearts...Next 12 Exits in 1999 that they started to gain widespread acclaim. The album's name comes from the name of a mobile home park along Highway 101 in Santa Barbara. Also, "...next 12 exits" refers to a nearby sign on Highway 101 North that reads "Santa Barbara, Next 12 Exits". The album contained personal, storytelling lyrics. After this album, Riley left the band to go back to school, and Marco Peña re-joined the band. In 2001 the band took part in the Vans Warped Tour. The band's third full-length studio album, End Is Forever, was also released in 2001.

=== So Long, Astoria (2002–2004) ===
In 2002, the lineup changed again, with John Collura replacing Peña on guitar. Prior to this, Collura had played in his own band Beefcake who'd toured with the Ataris. He'd also done time on tour as a guitar tech for the Ataris just prior to Peña's departure.

During this same period, the Ataris' contract with Kung Fu Records expired, and the band chose to sign with Columbia Records. Later that year, they began recording their fourth full-length album and major label debut, So Long, Astoria, released on March 4, 2003. Produced by Lou Giordano, the album's production served as a stark contrast to any of the band's past releases, as previous efforts were recorded in short time spans between tours.

So Long, Astoria was widely credited for introducing the Ataris to a larger mainstream audience and generating several successful singles, including "In This Diary" and "The Saddest Song". Musically, the album showcased very personal, encrypted and slightly more optimistic songwriting with a more refined, straightforward rock sound, not unlike Jimmy Eat World. This album also included their hit cover song, originally recorded by Don Henley, "The Boys of Summer", which much to the dismay of the band became their "accidental" second single after the radio station KROQ in Los Angeles started playing it, even though the band had already chosen the song "My Reply" as their second single. The single is their highest-charting single to date, reaching No. 20 on the Billboard Hot 100.

The band toured behind this record for most of 2003 and into early 2004 adding another guitarist (Joseph A. Farriella) to the band. That year also saw the release of a low-key live album, Live At The Metro, along with a track on the Spider-Man 2 soundtrack. So Long, Astoria sold well in excess of 700,000 copies and was certified gold. After a number of personal, financial and artistic differences, this line-up decided to go its separate ways over the summer and fall of 2004.

Davenport, interested in playing heavier music, became a founding member of the band Versus the World, while Knapp stopped playing music altogether and stayed in Santa Barbara. Details regarding the departures of Knapp and Davenport have been kept quiet for sometime, and neither camp has appeared interested in fueling any public debate or ill-will. Looking for some time off, Roe headed back to Indiana while Collura and Farriella moved back to New York, though they would later regroup to begin the recordings of the band's next album.

=== Welcome the Night (2005–2007) ===
After some time off, Roe and Collura later moved forward and began writing songs that would become part of the follow-up to So Long, Astoria titled Welcome the Night. They held some informal practices with some friends from New York, who played in the band Park Ranger. These sessions led to three members of Park Ranger joining the Ataris: Sean Hansen on bass, Shane Chickeles on drums, and Paul Carabello on third guitar. To round out the lineup they added longtime friends Bob Hoag, formerly of Pollen and the Go Reflex (which was managed by Roe), on piano and keyboards, and Angus Cooke on cello. Cooke played cello on past Ataris records, and helped with production as well. Starting in 2005, the band began recording Welcome the Night at Seedy Underbelly in California, with producer Nick Launay. Writing and recording eventually took the better part of two years and was extended to multiple studios. The album was routinely delayed by Columbia.

On June 10, 2006, the band announced that it had left Columbia Records due to the label's internal disintegration. In November 2006, the Ataris started their own imprint, Isola Recordings, through Sanctuary Records and RED Distribution, and simultaneously announced the official release date of their fifth album Welcome the Night as February 20, 2007. Welcome the Night debuted at number 85 on the Billboard charts with over 12,000 copies sold. Following the album's release, the band embarked on a tour of the United States and Europe.

=== EP releases and Revolution Summer (2008–present) ===
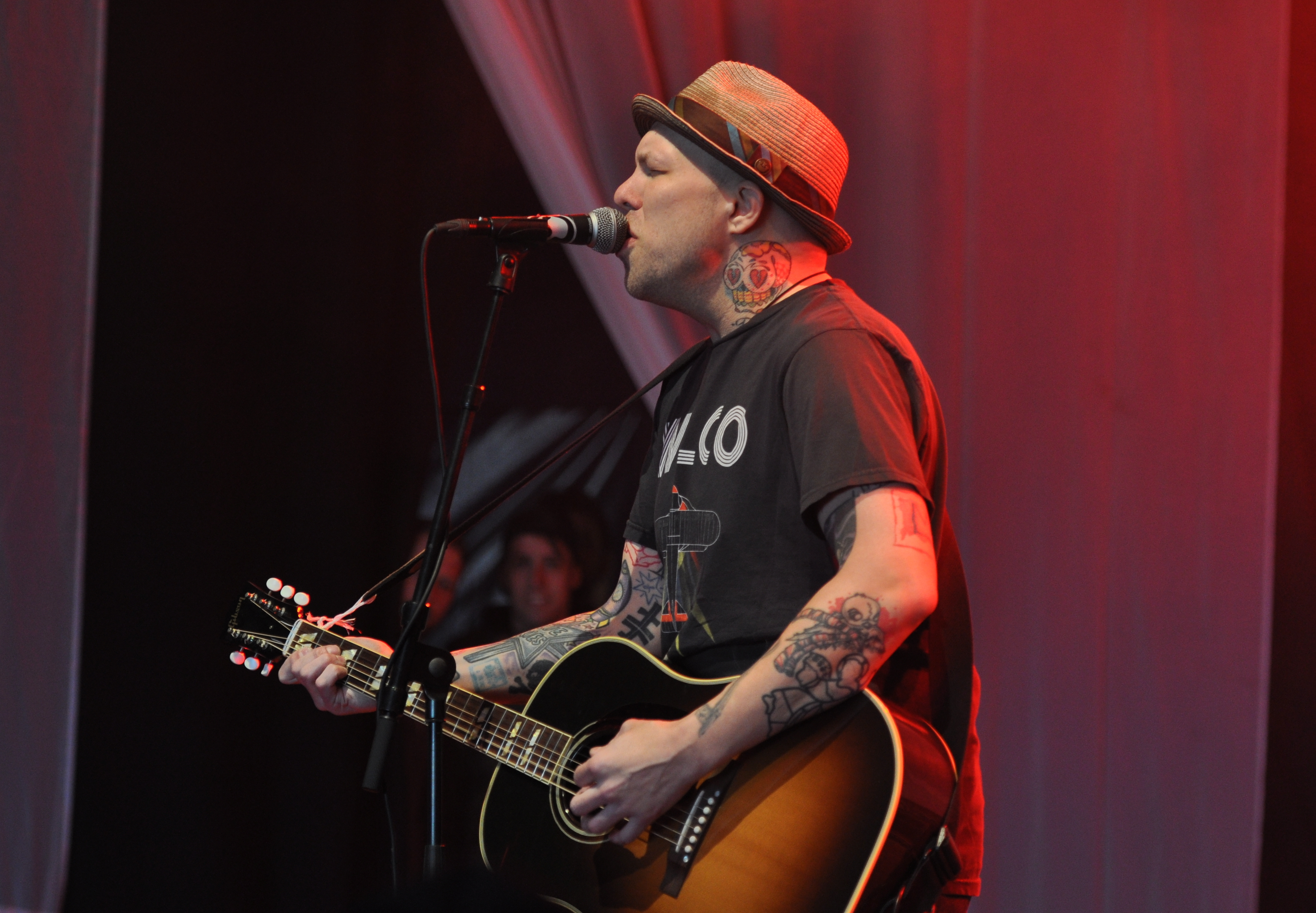
Kris Roe performing at an acoustic session at Groezrock 2013

In June 2008, the band began demoing at The Gallows Recording Studio in Muncie, Indiana in preparation for recording in late summer, with the aim of releasing a new album in 2009. In November, the band posted a clip of a demo online. The following month, the band entered the studio to record their next album. On December 29, it was mentioned that drums had been completed and that guitars were next. In January 2009, the band went on a tour of the UK. On April 12, a demo titled "All Souls' Day" was posted on the group's Myspace. In addition, it was mentioned that their next album would be released in the summer. Between April and June 2009, the band toured the US, with shows in South Africa in the middle of this trek. After this, they appeared on the 2009 Warped Tour. The finished version of "All Souls' Day" was posted online in June 2009. On August 17, 2009, the band announced they had nearly finished recording their next album, tentatively titled Graveyard of the Atlantic. They went on a short Midwest tour in November 2009.

Between February and April 2010, the Ataris went on a cross-country US tour with Don't Panic, and then performed at the Windy City Sound Clash festival. Following this, they went on another US tour between July and September 2010. That same year, a two track songs, All Souls' Day & the Graveyard of the Atlantic containing just its title tracks was released under the Paper + Plastick label. In 2012, the band released a four track EP entitled The Graveyard of the Atlantic. From 2013, the Ataris began a North American tour with Kris Roe as singer and the former members John Collura, Mike Davenport and Chris Knapp to celebrate the 10 years of their most successful album So Long, Astoria. In 2015, the band release an acoustic album, titled Hang Your Head in Hope. In 2016, the band released a six-song EP entitled October in This Railroad Earth through Bandcamp.

In 2017, Warped Tour announced that the Ataris was going to play on the 2017 tour. On June 18, 2017, the band released a compilation titled Silver Turns to Rust on Bandcamp. This compilation featured four previously released tracks from The Graveyard of the Atlantic and six from the previously released EP October in this Railroad Earth.

In 2024, Kris Roe posted via the Ataris' Facebook page that the band is currently in the studio with producer and former drummer Bob Hoag to record the next album. Roe also confirmed that the band would most likely not use The Graveyard of the Atlantic as the album title. Roe also confirmed Bob Hoag recorded drums on the upcoming record. On February 9, 2025, Roe confirmed bass and drums for the new record are officially recorded and is currently in the process of recording remaining guitars and vocals. On February 14, 2025, Roe confirmed that a cover of "Summer of '69" by Bryan Adams as one of the songs confirmed for the new album.

On May 2, 2025, the Ataris released a new single, "Car Song". The song was previously available as a demo via the band's bandcamp profile. In January 2026, the band announced that their new album would be released in March or April; ultimately, however, it never arrived on either date. The following month, the band was announced as part of the lineup for the Louder Than Life music festival in Louisville, scheduled to take place in September. In April 2026, Roe revealed Revolution Summer as the title of the new Ataris album, and announced that the band has been "in talks with several labels working to finalize the logistics of which label it will be coming out on." Bassist Mike Davenport later stated that Revolution Summer is expected to be released in 2027.

== Musical style and influences ==
The Ataris has been described as pop-punk, emo, punk rock and alternative rock. Terry Bezer of Screen Rant stated that the band retained its sound "as trends began to change in the early 2000s." Their lyrics are said to be optimistic in tone.

The band's influences include Descendents, Jawbreaker, All, Fugazi, Avail, the Ramones, and The Replacements.

== Controversy ==
While performing in Asbury Park, New Jersey on October 7, 2012, frontman Kris Roe acted hostile towards then-drummer Rob Felicetti on stage - throwing his guitar at him, then breaking the drum kit apart throwing various drum stands and the kick drum at Rob. Kris said he had "had enough" and "could not take it anymore" as the drummer was performing "off-time" throughout their set (a claim refuted by various professional drummers). A fan had captured the incident on camera, and was subsequently uploaded to social media. Roe claimed in a follow-up video regarding the incident that Felicetti was drunk during the performance, a claim Felicetti later denied. This incident led Felicetti to exit the band.

== Band members ==
Current

- Kristopher Roe – lead vocals, rhythm guitar (1996–present), bass guitar (1996–1997, 2005–2007)
- Mike Davenport – bass guitar (1998–2005, 2013–2014, 2023-present)
- Chris Knapp – drums (1998–2005, 2013–2014, 2023-present)
- John Collura – lead guitar, backing vocals, piano (2001–2008), (2013–2014, So Long Astoria reunion shows only), occasional appearances (2023-2024), (2025-present)
- Dustin Phillips – drums (2016–present)

Former

- Jasin Thomason – lead guitar, backing vocals (1996–1998)
- Marko DeSantis – bass guitar (1997-1998)
- Derrick Plourde – drums (1997–1998; died 2005)
- Marco Peña – lead guitar (1998–2001)
- Patrick Riley – lead guitar (1998)
- Joseph A. Farriella – rhythm guitar, backing vocals (2003–2005)
- Paul Carabello – rhythm guitar, backing vocals, lead guitar (2005–2008)
- Sean Hansen – bass guitar, backing vocals, drums (2005–2008)
- Angus Cooke – cello (2005–2008)
- Shane Chikeles – drums, percussion (2005–2008)
- Bob Hoag – keyboards, percussion (2005–2013), drums (2012–2013)
- Christopher Swinney – lead guitar, backing vocals (2008–2009)
- Bryan Nelson – bass guitar (2008–2016)
- Jacob Dwiggins – drums (2008–2012)
- Aaron Glass – guitar (2010)
- Rob Felicetti – lead guitar (2010–2012), drums (2012)
- Thomas Holst – lead guitar (2011–2016), rhythm guitar (2011–2012)
- Erik Perkins – drums (2013–2016)
- Mike Woods – bass guitar (2016–2018)
- Dustin Phillips – drums (2016–2023)
- Dale Nixon – lead guitar (2018-2023)
- Danny Duke – bass guitar (2018-2023)
- Brian Bonsall – lead guitar, bass guitar (2016-2018, 2023-2025)

== Discography ==
Studio albums

- Anywhere but Here (1997)
- Blue Skies, Broken Hearts...Next 12 Exits (1999)
- End Is Forever (2001)
- So Long, Astoria (2003)
- Welcome the Night (2007)
- Hang Your Head in Hope (2015)
- Silver Turns to Rust (2017)
- Revolution Summer (2027)

EPs

- Hawaii 1985 (with Junglefish) (1996)
- Look Forward to Failure (1998)
- Wrists of Fury (with Douglas) (2000)
- Let It Burn (with Useless ID) (2000)
- All You Can Ever Learn Is What You Already Know (2002)
- The Graveyard of the Atlantic (2012)
- October in This Railroad Earth (2016)

Live albums

- Live at Capitol Milling (2003)
- Live at the Metro (2004)
- Live in Chicago 2019 (2020)
