= Welcome the Night =

Studio album by the Ataris
- Released: February 20, 2007
- Recorded: 2005–2006
- Studios: Seedy Underbelly, Los Angeles
- Genres: Alternative rock; indie rock
- Length: 52:21
- Labels: Isola; Sanctuary
- Producer: Nick Launay

The Ataris chronology
So Long, Astoria (2003)	Welcome the Night (2007)

Singles from Welcome the Night
- 1. "Not Capable of Love" Released: November 14, 2006; 2. "And We All Become Like Smoke" Released: 2007

Welcome the Night is the fifth studio album by American rock band the Ataris.

== Background ==
In February 2005, it was reported that the band expanded to a seven-piece, with the addition of keyboardist Bob Hoag of Go Reflex, Angus Cooke of Bad Astronaut, and an extra, unnamed person on guitar. They spent the next two months with producer Nick Launay recording their next album Welcome the Night. The band said they had finished working on it in March 2006.

== Release ==
On April 24, 2006, "Whatever Lies Will Help You Rest" was posted on the Ataris' Myspace profile. On June 10, 2006, it was announced that the band had left Columbia Records. The band explained that they asked to be let go from their recording contract, since the release of So Long, Astoria, "almost every key person working at Columbia has either been fired or has quit [...] We, like so many of the great people who have recently left Columbia, are not interested in remaining on a label that is in the process of being dismantled." The group mentioned that this caused a minor delay in releasing Welcome the Night. In September 2006, they embarked on a tour of Brazil as part of Zona Punk, a South American variation of Warped Tour. On November 7, it was announced that the band started their own label, Isola Recordings, and partnered with Sanctuary Records to release Welcome the Night in a few months' time. On November 14, "Not Capable of Love" was made available for streaming via the band's Myspace account, and released to radio on the same day. The song was released to iTunes on December 19, featuring "Welcome the Night" as the B-side.

On January 14, 2007, "The Cheyenne Line" was posted on their Myspace. Welcome the Night was made available for streaming on January 15, 2007, before being released on February 20, 2007 through Isola Recordings and Sanctuary Records. Early pressings of the CD purchased at Best Buy contained a bonus disc with "The First Elegy" as track one and "Sonnet for the Early Departed" as track two. Also, early pressings of the CD purchased at Target contain the bonus track "The Ghost of Last December". The special edition of this album, sold in Canada and Europe by HMV, contains "Welcome the Night" and "The Ghost of Last December" as bonus tracks. The video for "Not Capable of Love" was released in February. From late February to early April, the band went on their first U.S. tour in three years. They were supported by Asobi Seksu, Blackpool Lights, and Wax on Radio. In April 2007, they appeared at the Groezrock festival in Europe. The US branch of Sanctuary Records ceased operations in June 2007. That same month, they toured across the US, and appeared at Fuji Rock Festival in Japan. In September and October 2007, the band toured North America, which included a performance at Waidestock festival.

== Reception ==
Professional ratings
Review scores
Source	Rating
AbsolutePunk	43%
AllMusic	3/5 stars
Chart Attack	Unfavorable
Exclaim!	Unfavorable
laut.de	2/5 stars
Melodic	4/5 stars
The Phantom Tollbooth	3.5/5
Punknews.org	3.5/5 stars
Revolver	3/5 stars
Rolling Stone	2/5 stars

The album debuted at number 85 on the Billboard 200, selling about 10,000 copies in its first week on the chart.

== Track listing ==
All lyrics are written by Kris Roe.

Welcome the Night
No.	Title	Music	Length
1.	"Not Capable of Love"	Roe	3:29
2.	"Cardiff-by-the-Sea"	Roe	4:12
3.	"New Year's Day"	Roe, John Collura	3:13
4.	"Secret Handshakes"	Roe	3:42
5.	"The Cheyenne Line"	Roe, Collura	3:11
6.	"And We All Become Like Smoke"	Roe, Collura	3:59
7.	"Connections Are More Dangerous Than Lies"	Roe	2:59
8.	"Whatever Lies Will Help You Rest"	Roe, Sean Hansen	3:32
9.	"From the Last, Last Call"	Roe	4:09
10.	"When All Else Fails It Fails"	Roe, Collura	3:34
11.	"A Soundtrack for This Rainy Morning"	Roe, Collura, Hansen, Paul Carabello, Angus Cooke, Bob Hoag	4:47
12.	"Begin Again from the Beginning"	Roe, Collura	5:39
13.	"Act V, Scene IV: and So It Ends Like It Begins"	Roe, Collura	5:56

B-Sides
No.	Title	Length
1.	"Sonnet for the Early Departed"	5:59
2.	"The Driftwood Sinn"	3:48
3.	"The First Elegy"	2:17
4.	"The Ghost of Last December"	3:13
5.	"Welcome the Night"	3:27

== Personnel ==
Band

- Kris Roe - Vocals, Guitar, Percussion, Theremin
- John Collura - Guitar, Piano
- Paul Carabello - Guitar, Vocals, Percussion
- Sean Hansen - Bass, Vocals, Percussion, Drums
- Shane Chikeles - Drums, Percussion
- Angus Cooke - Cello, Percussion
- Bob Hoag - Piano, Mellotron, Percussion, Vocals

Production

- Nick Launay - Production
- Tim Palmer - Mixing
- Thom Flowers - Production (on "Not Capable of Love", "New Year's Day" and "Connections are More Dangerous Than Lies")
- Paul David Hagar - Mixing (on "Not Capable of Love", "New Year's Day" and "Connections are More Dangerous Than Lies")
- Stever Marcussen - Mastering

== Charts ==
Chart performance
Chart (2007)	Peak position
Canadian Albums (Nielsen SoundScan)	84
Japanese Albums (Oricon)	68
UK Albums (Official Charts)	198
UK Independent Albums (Official Charts)	8
US Billboard 200	85
US Independent Albums (Billboard)	5
