= The Saddest Song =

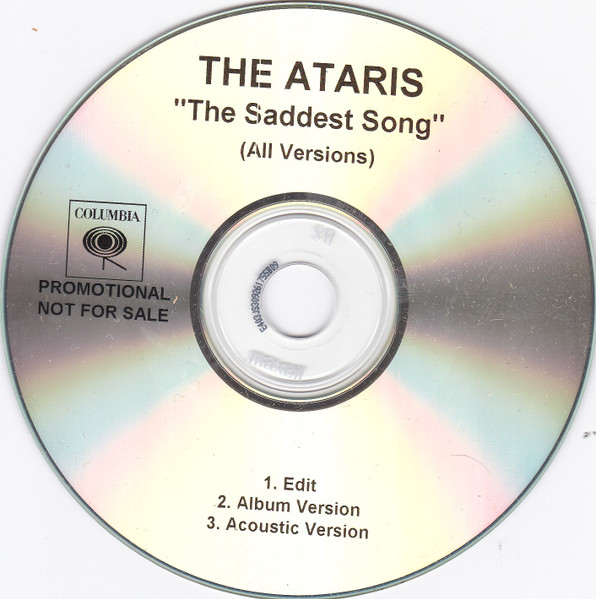

Single by the Ataris

from the album So Long, Astoria
- Released: September 9, 2003
- Genre: Emo pop
- Length: 4:15 (standard version); 4:09 (acoustic version)
- Label: Columbia
- Songwriter: Kris Roe

The Ataris singles chronology
"The Boys of Summer" (2003)	"The Saddest Song" (2003)	"Not Capable of Love" (2006)

"The Saddest Song" is a song by the Ataris. The ballad was released as the third and final single from their fourth album, So Long, Astoria. It reached #27 on the US Modern Rock Tracks.

This song was written by singer Kris Roe about being away from his daughter, Starla. He also cites his own broken childhood.

The accompanying music video shows the band playing in an abandoned house with a little girl trying to find them.

== Chart performance ==
"The Saddest Song" peaked at number 27 on the US Modern Rock chart.

Chart (2003)	Peak position
U.S. Modern Rock Tracks (Billboard)	27
