= Bacon Popper =

Electronic music duo

Bacon Popper was an electronic music duo best known for their 1998 dance single "Free," which was memorable in part for its lyrical refrain "you're just a bunch of freaks," and for its sample of U2's song "New Year's Day." "Free" peaked at number 43 on the Australian ARIA Charts.

The duo was made up of Italian DJ and producer Paola Peroni and American vocalist Lisa Marie Simmons. Bacon Popper released two singles in 1998—"Free," a major European hit, and "Rejoice in Love"—followed by an eight-track album in 1999, also called Free; later singles included "Trip to India/I Gonna Do" in 2001 and "Get Up and Party" in 2002.

In the year 2009 is make the first official remix by the Italian dj/producer Stefano Mattara (Mat's Remix).

As of 2014, Peroni is still active as a producer and DJ on the European club scene. Also working under the name Miss Groovy, Peroni is a native of Brescia, Italy. Simmons, a native of Boulder, Colorado, and former student of the American Academy of Dramatic Arts, is still based in Italy and working as a singer-songwriter.

In January 2025, the Trio of Italian DJs Tr3nacria, a remix of the famous success "Free" in collab with Peroni for Egomusic. The title of the song "Free Now" Rehabilitates the old success in a more contemporary and dump-rich way.
