= The Boys of Summer (song) =

1984 single by Don Henley

Single by Don Henley

from the album Building the Perfect Beast
- B-side: "A Month of Sundays"
- Released: October 26, 1984
- Genre: Heartland rock; electronic rock; synth-pop
- Length: 4:48
- Label: Geffen
- Songwriters: Don Henley; Mike Campbell
- Producers: Don Henley; Danny Kortchmar; Greg Ladanyi; Mike Campbell

Don Henley singles chronology
"I Can't Stand Still" (1983)	"The Boys of Summer" (1984)	"All She Wants to Do Is Dance" (1985)

Music video
- "The Boys of Summer" on YouTube

"The Boys of Summer" is a song by American rock musician Don Henley. The lyrics were written by Henley and the music was composed by Mike Campbell of Tom Petty and the Heartbreakers. It was released on October 26, 1984, as the lead single from Henley's second solo studio album Building the Perfect Beast. It reached number five on the Billboard Hot 100 chart in the US, number one on the Billboard Top Rock Tracks chart, and number 12 on the UK singles chart.

The music video won several awards. "The Boys of Summer" was also performed live by Henley with the reunited Eagles; a version is included on the band's double DVD Farewell 1 Tour: Live from Melbourne (2005). "The Boys of Summer" has been covered by several artists, including DJ Sammy in 2002 and American punk rock band the Ataris in 2003.

== Writing ==
Mike Campbell, the guitarist for Tom Petty and the Heartbreakers, wrote a demo for "The Boys of Summer" while experimenting with a LinnDrum drum machine and Oberheim Xpander synthesizer. He showed it to Tom Petty but he felt it did not fit with the record they were working on, Southern Accents (1985). At the suggestion of its record producer Jimmy Iovine, Campbell played it for Don Henley, who wrote the lyrics and recorded the vocals. They re-recorded the song after Henley decided to change the key.

== Composition and meaning ==
"The Boys of Summer" is a heartland rock, electronic rock and synth-pop song, using a repeating guitar riff. It was recorded in the key of D♯ minor with a tempo of 177 beats per minute (BPM). Henley's vocals span F♯_{3} to A♯_{4}. However, it has been played as if it were in C♯ minor but with a capo added on the 2nd fret, which transposes it a whole step higher to D♯ minor.

The lyrics appear to be about the passing of youth and entering middle age, with the nostalgic theme of "summer love" and reminiscence of a past relationship. In a 1987 interview with Rolling Stone, Henley explained that the song is about aging and questioning the past—a recurring theme in Henley's lyrics (cf. "The End of the Innocence", and "Taking You Home".) In an interview with NME in 1985, Henley explained the '"Deadhead sticker on a Cadillac" lyric as an example of his generation selling out.

I was driving down the San Diego Freeway and got passed by a $21,000 Cadillac Seville, the status symbol of the right-wing upper-middle-class American bourgeoisie – all the guys with the blue blazers with the crests and the grey pants – and there was this Grateful Dead "Deadhead" bumper sticker on it!

The song's title is taken from Roger Kahn's 1972 book about the Brooklyn Dodgers, which was in turn taken from a Dylan Thomas poem.

== Accolades ==
"The Boys of Summer" reached No. 5 on the Billboard Hot 100 and topped the Billboard Top Rock Tracks chart for five weeks. It was his most successful hit in the United Kingdom, reaching No. 12 on the UK singles chart. A re-release of the single in 1998 also reached No. 12.

Billboard called it "dance oriented pop swimming in synths and reverberating guitar".

In 1986, Henley won the Grammy Award for Best Male Rock Vocal Performance for the song at the 28th Annual Grammy Awards. In 2004, "The Boys of Summer" was ranked No. 423 on Rolling Stone magazine's list of The 500 Greatest Songs of All Time. In 2021, in their updated list of the 500 Greatest Songs of All Time, Rolling Stone re-ranked "The Boys of Summer" at No. 209. "The Boys of Summer" is included in The Pitchfork 500, Pitchfork Media's "Guide to the Greatest Songs from Punk to Present".

Tom Petty was astounded by the track's success. One day, he and Mike Campbell were out on a car drive to listen to a mix of their song "Don't Come Around Here No More", but turned on the ignition and heard "The Boys of Summer". Campbell changed the station in case the song would upset Petty, but another station was also playing the song. Petty enjoyed listening to it and regretted initially turning it down.

== Music video ==
The music video to "The Boys of Summer" is a French New Wave-influenced piece directed by Jean-Baptiste Mondino. Shot in black and white, it shows the main character of the song at three different stages of life (as a young boy, a young adult and middle-aged), in each case reminiscing about a past relationship. Interspersed with these scenes are segments of Henley singing the words of the song while riding in a pickup truck. The boy is dressed in a style typical of the 1950s, the teenage lovers are dressed in a style characteristic of the early 1960s while the middle-aged man is dressed in the style of the 1980s. As a boy in the 1950s, the protagonist practices playing the drums, suggesting musical aspirations; as a teenager in the 1960s, he runs down a beach with his girlfriend whom he kisses passionately; and as a middle-aged man in the 1980s, he appears to be an executive of some sort who is comfortable, but unhappy in life as he sits at his desk remembering his youth. The young boy in the video is played by a seven-year-old Josh Paul, while the girl is played by Audie England. Interspersed with these scenes are segments of Henley articulating the words of the song while appearing to be riding in the back of a pickup truck through the streets of Los Angeles. At its conclusion, the video uses the post-modern concept of exposing its own workings, as an automobile pulls away from a rear projection screen of the video playing until it's revealed from the rear-view mirror that Don Henley was actually driving a car the whole time.

The video won the Video of the Year at the 1985 MTV Video Music Awards (leading Henley to comment at the Awards the following year that he had won for "riding around in the back of a pickup"). It also won that year's awards for Best Direction, Best Art Direction, and Best Cinematography. The Best Direction award was presented to Jean-Baptiste Mondino by Henley's then-former Eagles bandmate Glenn Frey.

== Personnel ==
- Don Henley – vocals
- Mike Campbell – synthesizers, guitars, LinnDrum programming, Linn 9000 programming, percussion
- Danny Kortchmar – synthesizers, guitars
- Steve Porcaro – synthesizers
- Larry Klein – bass

== Charts ==
=== Weekly charts ===
Chart (1984–1985)	Peak position
Australia (Kent Music Report)	3
Canada Retail Singles (The Record)	30
Canada Top Singles (RPM)	15
Europe (European Hot 100 Singles)	17
Ireland (IRMA)	7
Netherlands (Dutch Top 40)	26
Netherlands (Single Top 100)	23
New Zealand (Recorded Music NZ)	18
UK Singles (OCC)	12
US Billboard Hot 100	5
US Mainstream Rock (Billboard)	1
West Germany (GfK)	18

Chart (1998)	Peak position
Europe (Eurochart Hot 100)	37
Ireland (IRMA)	23
Scottish Singles Sales (Official Charts)	12
UK Singles (OCC)	12

Chart (2009)	Peak position
Finland (Suomen virallinen lista)	16
Sweden (Sverigetopplistan)	35

Chart (2025–2026)	Peak position
Japan Hot Overseas (Billboard Japan)	11
Netherlands Airplay (Dutch Charts)	38

=== Year-end charts ===
Chart (1985)	Rank
Australia (Kent Music Report)	37
US Billboard Hot 100	53

== Certifications ==
Region	Certification	Certified units/sales
Denmark (IFPI Danmark)	Gold	45,000^{‡}
Germany (BVMI)	Gold	300,000^{‡}
New Zealand (RMNZ)	4× Platinum	120,000^{‡}
United Kingdom (BPI)	2× Platinum	1,200,000^{‡}
^{‡} Sales+streaming figures based on certification alone.

== DJ Sammy version ==
"The Boys of Summer"
- Standard artwork for most CD releases

Single by DJ Sammy

from the album Heaven
- B-side: "Appalachian Fall"
- Released: October 21, 2002
- Length: 4:55
- Label: Pulp; Urban
- Songwriters: Don Henley; Mike Campbell
- Producers: DJ Sammy; Martin Eyerer; Oliver Laib

DJ Sammy singles chronology
"Sunlight" (2002)	"The Boys of Summer" (2002)	"Rise Again" (2004)

Music video
- "The Boys of Summer" on YouTube

In 2002, Spanish trance artist DJ Sammy (with lead vocals performed by Dutch singer Loona) covered the song. It was released in 2002 as the third and final single from his second studio album, Heaven (2002). This cover peaked at number two in the United Kingdom and was one of New Zealand's most successful hits of 2002, reaching number three and earning a gold certification from the Recording Industry Association of New Zealand.

=== Track listings ===
European maxi-CD single

1. "The Boys of Summer" (original radio edit) – 3:58
2. "The Boys of Summer" (original extended version) – 6:33
3. "The Boys of Summer" (Green Court remix) – 8:08
4. "Appalachian Fall" – 4:54

UK CD single

1. "The Boys of Summer" (radio edit)
2. "The Boys of Summer" (Jessy remix)
3. "Heaven" (the Candleflip Bootleg mix)
4. "The Boys of Summer" (CD-ROM video)

US maxi-CD single

1. "The Boys of Summer" (radio version) – 3:58
2. "The Boys of Summer" (extended version) – 6:28
3. "The Boys of Summer" (Green Court remix) – 8:00
4. "The Boys of Summer" (Humate remix) – 8:12
5. "The Boys of Summer" (Martin Eyerer remix) – 8:42
6. "Appalachian Fall" – 4:16

=== Charts ===
==== Weekly charts ====
Chart (2002–2003)	Peak position
Australia (ARIA)	9
Australian Dance (ARIA)	2
Austria (Ö3 Austria Top 40)	49
Belgium (Ultratop 50 Flanders)	20
Czech Republic (IFPI)	33
Europe (Eurochart Hot 100)	8
Germany (GfK)	25
Hungary (Rádiós Top 40)	27
Ireland (IRMA)	15
Ireland Dance (IRMA)	2
Netherlands (Dutch Top 40)	19
Netherlands (Single Top 100)	31
New Zealand (Recorded Music NZ)	3
Scottish Singles Sales (Official Charts)	1
Sweden (Sverigetopplistan)	36
UK Singles (Official Charts)	2
UK Dance (Official Charts)	7
US Maxi-Singles Sales (Billboard)	5

==== Year-end charts ====
Chart (2002)	Position
Australia (ARIA)	54
Australian Dance (ARIA)	12
New Zealand (RIANZ)	9

Chart (2003)	Position
Australia (ARIA)	69
Australian Dance (ARIA)	5
UK Singles (OCC)	47

=== Certifications ===
Region	Certification	Certified units/sales
Australia (ARIA)	Gold	35,000^{^}
New Zealand (RMNZ)	Gold	5,000^{*}
United Kingdom (BPI)	Silver	200,000^{‡}
^{*} Sales figures based on certification alone.^{^} Shipments figures based on certification alone.^{‡} Sales+streaming figures based on certification alone.

=== Release history ===
Region	Date	Format(s)	Label(s)	Ref.
Australia	October 21, 2002	CD	Central Station	
Europe	November 18, 2002	CD	Pulp; Urban	
United Kingdom	February 24, 2003	12-inch vinyl; CD; cassette	Data	

== Ataris version ==
"The Boys of Summer"
- Artwork for overseas commercial release

Single by the Ataris

from the album So Long, Astoria
- Released: June 3, 2003
- Genre: Punk rock; pop-punk
- Length: 4:20
- Label: Columbia
- Songwriters: Don Henley; Mike Campbell

The Ataris singles chronology
"In This Diary" (2003)	"The Boys of Summer" (2003)	"The Saddest Song" (2003)

Music video
- "The Boys of Summer" on YouTube

In 2003, the American rock band the Ataris released a punk rock and pop-punk cover of "The Boys of Summer" on their fourth studio album So Long, Astoria. It became their second single when a radio station began to play it. The single peaked at No. 2 on the Billboard Modern Rock Chart (held off the No. 1 top spot by Linkin Park's "Faint") and No. 20 on the Billboard Hot 100. It remains their most successful single.

The Ataris' version of the song replaced the "Deadhead sticker" reference with one that the band felt was more appropriate to the age group of their fans, namely a "Black Flag sticker", in honor of the punk rock band from the 1980s. Asked in a 2016 interview whether he was okay with the lyric change, Henley responded, "No, not really ... And if you noticed, we haven't heard much from the Ataris since then." Campbell, however, said that "it's not a song you expect a young band like that to do, but I kind of like their version of it."

=== Music video ===
The music video was directed by Steven Murashige and was released in July 2003.

=== Charts ===
Chart (2003–2004)	Peak position
Australia (ARIA)	24
Canada CHR (Nielsen BDS)	10
Germany (GfK)	45
New Zealand (Recorded Music NZ)	17
Switzerland (Schweizer Hitparade)	87
UK Singles (OCC)	49
US Billboard Hot 100	20
US Adult Top 40 (Billboard)	18
US Mainstream Rock Tracks (Billboard)	36
US Mainstream Top 40 (Billboard)	10
US Modern Rock Tracks (Billboard)	2

=== Certifications ===
Region	Certification	Certified units/sales
New Zealand (RMNZ)	Gold	15,000^{‡}
United Kingdom (BPI)	Silver	200,000^{‡}
United States (RIAA)	Gold	500,000^{*}
^{*} Sales figures based on certification alone.^{‡} Sales+streaming figures based on certification alone.

== The Lightning Kids version ==
In 2022, British band the Lightning Kids released their version of "The Boys of Summer" as a single from their album All of Those Nights.
