= Look Forward to Failure =

EP by The Ataris
- Released: November 10, 1998
- Recorded: September 14–18, 1998
- Studio: Silver Cloud Recording, Redondo Beach, California; Sound City Studios, Los Angeles, California
- Genre: Pop punk, skate punk
- Length: 14:40
- Label: Fat Wreck Chords
- Producer: Bill Stevenson, Stephen Egerton, Joey Cape

The Ataris chronology
Anywhere but Here (1997)	Look Forward to Failure (1998)	Blue Skies, Broken Hearts...Next 12 Exits (1999)

Look Forward to Failure is an EP released on November 10, 1998, by The Ataris on Fat Wreck Chords. This was the first album released to feature fan favorite "San Dimas High School Football Rules", a song that would later appear on Blue Skies, Broken Hearts...Next 12 Exits. The band also intended on putting the song "That Special Girl" on Blue Skies, Broken Hearts as well but it didn't make the cut. The song features Mark Hoppus of Blink-182 on backing vocals. The version of "My Hotel Year" that appears on this EP is the electric version and contains an extra verse at the end. The version that ended up on Blue Skies was acoustic and shortened.

Professional ratings
Review scores
Source	Rating
Allmusic	4/5 stars

== Track listing ==
No.	Title	Length
1.	"San Dimas High School Football Rules"	2:45
2.	"Not a Worry in the World"	2:22
3.	"My So Called Life"	2:41
4.	"My Hotel Year"	2:18
5.	"Between You and Me"	2:36
6.	"That Special Girl" (featuring Mark Hoppus)	1:55
Total length:		14:40

== Band members ==
- Kris Roe – vocals, guitar
- Patrick Riley – guitar
- Michael Davenport – bass
- Chris Knapp – drums

== Additional personnel ==
- Backup vocals were provided by Mark Hoppus and Chad Price.
- Tracks 2, 3, 4, and 6 were recorded and mixed at The Blasting Room in Fort Collins, CO on September 14–18, 1998. They were produced and engineered by Bill Stevenson and Stephen Egerton and mixed by Jason Livermore.
- Tracks 1 and 5 were recorded at Orange Whip Studios in Santa Barbara, CA. They were produced by Joey Cape and engineered by Angus Cooke.
