= Anywhere but Here (The Ataris album) =

Studio album by The Ataris
- Released: April 29, 1997
- Recorded: January 22–31, 1997 at F1 Music, Orange County, California
- Genres: Pop punk, skate punk, punk rock
- Length: 32:12
- Label: Kung Fu
- Producer: Warren Fitzgerald

The Ataris chronology
Anywhere but Here (1997)	Look Forward to Failure (1998)

Alternative cover
- 2002 re-release cover

Professional ratings
Review scores
Source	Rating
Allmusic	3/5 stars

Anywhere but Here (stylized as ...Anywhere but here) is the first full release on Kung Fu Records by The Ataris. The album was released on April 29, 1997, and was characterized by a straightforward, upbeat, pop punk sound. The majority of the songs clock in at two minutes or less in length.

On May 28, 2002, a remastered version of the album was released with an extra track ("Anderson"), a hidden track (an acoustic cover of Weezer's "Butterfly"), and some video footage. The track listing was also changed.

Kris Roe played all of the instruments on this record except for the drums, but was credited only as playing guitar and singing. Derrick Plourde from Lagwagon played drums.

== Track listings ==
=== Original release ===
1. "1-2-3-4"
2. "As We Speak"
3. "Bite My Tongue"
4. "Hey Kid!"
5. "Take Me Back"
6. "Are We There Yet?"
7. "Angry Nerd Rock"
8. "Let It Go"
9. "Lately"
10. "Alone in Santa Cruz"
11. "Make It Last"
12. "Sleepy"
13. "Four Chord Wonder"
14. "Blind and Unkind"
15. "Clara"
16. "Myself"
17. "Neilhouse"
18. "Perfectly Happy"
19. "Boxcar" (Originally performed by Jawbreaker)
20. "Ray"

=== 2002 re-release ===
1. "Bite My Tongue"
2. "Make It Last"
3. "Clara"
4. "As We Speak"
5. "Blind and Unkind"
6. "Take Me Back"
7. "Lately"
8. "Let It Go"
9. "Alone in Santa Cruz"
10. "Boxcar" (Originally performed by Jawbreaker)
11. "Are We There Yet?"
12. "Anderson"
13. "Neilhouse"
14. "Perfectly Happy"
15. "Myself"
16. "Four Chord Wonder"
17. "Hey Kid!"
18. "Sleepy"
19. "Angry Nerd Rock"
20. "1...2...3...4"
21. "Ray"
22. "Butterfly" (Originally performed by Weezer)

== Members ==
Kris Roe - Voice and guitar
Jasin Thomason - Guitar
Marko DeSantis - Bass
Derrick Plourde - Drums
