= DJ Sammy =

Spanish DJ and record producer (born 1969)

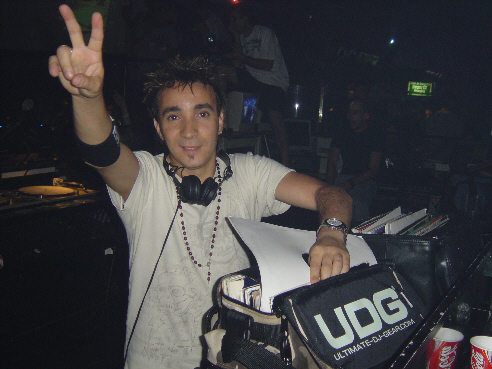
- DJ Sammy in 2005, performing at the BCM nightclub in Mallorca

Background information
- Also known as: Frankie Wilde; Le Petit Sam; Sammy Sofiane Bouriah
- Born: Samuel Bouriah; 19 October 1969 (age 56); Mallorca, Balearic Islands, Spain
- Genres: Eurotrance
- Occupations: DJ; record producer
- Years active: 1984–present

Samuel Bouriah (born 19 October 1969), better known by his stage name DJ Sammy, is a Spanish DJ and record producer. He has released five albums and has had five top-10 hits, including a cover of Bryan Adams' "Heaven", which reached number one in the UK in 2002. His career started with ex-wife Marie-José van der Kolk in the making of her first singles, under the stage name of DJ Sammy featuring Carisma.

== Career ==
DJ Sammy started his music career in 1984 in pubs and dance clubs of Mallorca. During this time he completed training as a sound technician at the Mallorca Music College. In 1991, he met dancer Marie-José van der Kolk and they performed at Zorba's Club in Palma. In 1992, DJ Sammy became resident DJ at the Joy Palace Club in Arenal and Marie Jose was a resident dancer there.

In November 1995, DJ Sammy released his first single "Life Is Just a Game" with Marie-José who started singing. The track became a Top 10 hit in the Spanish record chart. Other singles, such as "You're My Angel" and "Prince of Love", have been popular in the German record chart. In June 1998, DJ Sammy released his debut album, Life Is Just a Game.

DJ Sammy founded his own music label, Super M Records, as well as the Gamba Music Company. In 2002, Sammy released the album, Heaven with charting singles released such as "Sunlight" and cover versions of Bryan Adams, "Heaven" with Dutch vocalist Do and Don Henley's "The Boys of Summer".

In 2005, his next album was The Rise, with charting singles such as "Rise Again" which was featured on the 2004 movie soundtrack, It's All Gone Pete Tong, and a cover of Annie Lennox's "Why".

In 2007, Sammy collaborated with Enrique Iglesias, remixing his song "Tired of Being Sorry", the second track from his hit album, Insomniac. Following this success, in April 2007, Marta Sánchez released the song "Superstar", produced and co-written by Sammy. The song was her biggest hit since "Soy Yo". On David Bisbal's album Premonición, Sammy wrote and produced the track "Aquí Ahora". He also worked on Soraya Arnelas' album, Sin Miedo.

He toured the world with the Balearic Masters tour, which commenced at the end of 2007. He took his protégé, writer and singer, Nyah, who featured on the tracks "Everybody Hurts", "Feel the Love", "Animal", and "Look for Love" co-produced by Nick Marsh.

In June 2013, Sammy released the single such as "Shut Up and Kiss Me" with a vocalist The Jackie Boyz, the music video is directed by Mark Feuerstake.

In July 2020, Sammy released the single "This Is Who We Are" with Australian vocalist Chloe Martin.

== Personal life ==
Bouriah has a daughter, Saphira María (born 10 February 2005), from his previous marriage with van der Kolk who is also a singer and performs as Firefox alongside her mother.

== Discography ==
=== Studio albums ===
Title	Details	Peak chart positions							Certifications
Title	Details	AUS	FIN	GER	NZ	SWE	UK	US	Certifications
Life Is Just a Game	Release date: 29 June 1998; Label: Universal Records; Formats: CD	—	—	62	—	—	—	—	
Heaven	Release date: 6 August 2002; Label: Robbins; Formats: CD	64	30	—	10	24	14	67	BPI: Gold
The Rise	Release date: 10 May 2005; Label: Central Station; Formats: CD	—	—	—	—	—	—	—	
"—" denotes releases that did not chart

=== DJ mixes ===
Title	Details
DJ Sammy at Work	Release date: 1998; Label: Polystar; Format: CD

=== Singles ===
Year	Single	Peak chart positions													Certifications (sales thresholds)	Album
Year	Single	AUS	AUT	BEL (Fl)	CAN	GER	IRL	NED	NOR	NZ	SWE	SWI	UK	US	Certifications (sales thresholds)	Album
1995	"Life Is Just a Game" (featuring Carisma)	—	—	—	—	62	—	—	—	—	—	—	—	—		Life Is Just a Game
1996	"You're My Angel" (featuring Carisma)	—	—	—	—	—	—	—	—	—	—	—	—	—		Life Is Just a Game
1997	"Prince of Love" (featuring Carisma)	—	—	—	—	24	—	—	—	—	—	—	—	—		Life Is Just a Game
1997	"Golden Child" (featuring Carisma)	—	—	—	—	43	—	—	—	—	—	—	—	—		Life Is Just a Game
1998	"Magic Moment" (featuring Carisma)	—	—	—	—	67	—	—	—	—	—	—	—	—		Life Is Just a Game
1999	"In 2 Eternity" (featuring Carisma)	—	—	—	—	31	—	—	—	—	—	48	—	—		DJ Sammy at Work (In the Mix)
1999	"Lovestern Galaktika" (with Lovestern Galaktika Project)	—	—	—	—	32	—	—	—	—	—	—	—	—		The Music of a Dance-Generation
2000	"Loca Galaktika" (with Lovestern Galaktika Project)	—	—	—	—	35	—	—	—	—	—	—	—	—		The Music of a Dance-Generation
2001	"Heaven" (with Yanou featuring Do)	4	16	14	7	10	3	12	8	41	17	39	1	8	ARIA: Platinum; BPI: 2× Platinum; IFPI NOR: Gold; RIAA: Gold; SNEP: Gold	Heaven
2002	"Sunlight" (featuring Loona)	40	58	62	—	50	21	62	—	46	—	—	8	—		Heaven
2002	"The Boys of Summer" (featuring Loona & Mel)	9	49	20	—	25	15	31	—	3	36	—	2	—	ARIA: Gold; BPI: Silver	Heaven
2004	"Rise Again" (featuring Loona)	—	—	—	—	53	—	—	—	—	—	88	—	—		The Rise
2005	"Why" (featuring Britta Medeiros)	29	—	—	—	64	16	—	—	—	—	—	7	—		The Rise
2005	"L'bby Haba"	—	—	—	—	—	—	—	—	—	—	—	—	—		The Rise
2007	"Everybody Hurts" (featuring Nyah)	—	—	—	—	—	—	—	—	—	—	—	—	—		Singles Only
2009	"Feel the Love" (featuring Nyah)	—	—	—	—	—	—	—	—	—	—	—	—	—		Singles Only
2011	"Animal" (featuring Jean Baptiste & Nyah)	—	—	—	—	—	—	—	—	—	—	—	—	—		Singles Only
2012	"Look for Love"	—	—	—	—	—	—	—	—	—	—	—	—	—		Singles Only
2013	"Shut Up & Kiss Me" (featuring The Jackie Boyz)	—	54	—	—	65	—	—	—	—	—	—	—	—		Singles Only
2015	"I Wanna Luv Ya" (as Mafia Clowns (with Zeus & The Harleking) feat. Sean Kingston)	—	—	—	—	27	—	—	—	—	—	—	—	—		Singles Only
2020	"This Is Who We Are" (with Chloe Marin)	—	—	—	—	—	—	—	—	—	—	—	—	—		Singles Only
2023	"Braveheart" (with Renns featuring Scarlett)	—	—	—	—	—	—	—	—	—	—	—	—	—		Singles Only
2024	"Wildfire" (with Achilles and Beks)	—	—	—	—	—	—	—	—	—	—	—	—	—		
2026	"Don't Follow Me (Be My Lover)" (with Chris Diver)	—	—	—	—	—	—	—	—	—	—	—	—	—		
"—" denotes releases that did not chart.

=== Music videos ===
Year	Song	Album	Director(s)
1996	"You're My Angel"	Life Is Just a Game	
1997	"Prince of Love"	Life Is Just a Game	
1997	"Golden Child"	Life Is Just a Game	Oliver Sommer
1998	"Magic Moment"	Life Is Just a Game	Oliver Sommer
1999	"In 2 Eternity"	DJ Sammy at Work (In the Mix)	—N/a
2002	"Heaven"	Heaven	Oliver Bradford
2002	"Sunlight"	Heaven	—N/a
2002	"Boys of Summer"	Heaven	—N/a
2004	"Rise Again"	The Rise	
2005	"Why"	The Rise	Urban Ström
2011	"Animal"	Singles only	—N/a
2012	"Look for Love"	Singles only	—N/a
2013	"Shut Up and Kiss Me"	Singles only	Mark Feuerstake
