= Blue Skies, Broken Hearts...Next 12 Exits =

Studio album by The Ataris
- Released: April 13, 1999
- Recorded: June 1998 at Orange Whip Studios Santa Barbara, California
- Genre: Pop punk, punk rock, skate punk, emo
- Length: 36:31
- Label: Kung Fu
- Producer: Joey Cape

The Ataris chronology
Look Forward to Failure (1998)	Blue Skies, Broken Hearts...Next 12 Exits (1999)	End Is Forever (2001)

Blue Skies, Broken Hearts...Next 12 Exits is the second studio album by the American pop punk band The Ataris. It was released on Kung Fu Records on April 13, 1999. The album cover is the neon sign for the Blue Skies Mobile Park in Santa Barbara, California, taken by Roe. In December 1999, the band went on a midwest/west coast tour with MxPx.

== Reception ==
Professional ratings
Review scores
Source	Rating
AllMusic	4/5 stars
Punknews.org	3.5/5 stars

Cleveland.com ranked "San Dimas High School Rules" at number 44 on their list of the top 100 pop-punk songs.

== Track listing ==
All tracks are written by Kris Roe, except where noted.

No.	Title	Length
1.	"Losing Streak"	1:52
2.	"1*15*96" (Roe, Marko DeSantis)	3:54
3.	"San Dimas High School Football Rules"	2:47
4.	"Your Boyfriend Sucks"	2:48
5.	"I Won't Spend Another Night Alone"	2:59
6.	"Broken Promise Ring"	3:26
7.	"Angry Nerd Rock"	2:34
8.	"The Last Song I Will Ever Write About a Girl"	2:49
9.	"Choices"	1:33
10.	"Better Way"	2:03
11.	"My Hotel Year" (acoustic version)	1:26
12.	"Life Makes No Sense"	1:42
13.	"Answer:"	2:11
14.	"In Spite of the World" (Roe, Mike Davenport)	3:37
Total length:		36:31

Australian bonus track
No.	Title	Length
15.	"Ben Lee"

- "My Hotel Year" was originally recorded from the band's previous EP Look Forward to Failure, and was re-recorded for the album as an acoustic version.

== Personnel ==
The Ataris

- Kris Roe – Lead vocals, rhythm guitar
- Michael Davenport – Bass guitar, backing vocals
- Patrick Riley – Lead guitar, backing vocals
- Chris Knapp – Drums

Artwork

- Grace Walker – Art direction
- Kris Roe – Design and layout, photography
- Patrick Riley – Design and layout
- Larry Mills – Live photography

Production

- Joey Cape – Producer, mixing
- Angus Cooke – Engineer
- Jason Livermore – Mixing at The Blasting Room, Ft. Collins, CO

Management

- Alan Mintz – Legal representation
