= Christian Scharnweber =

German electronic music producer and DJ (born 1972)

- Also known as: DJ Mellow D, Mellow Trax
- Born: Christian Scharnweber; 9 November 1972 (age 53)
- Origin: Germany
- Genres: Trance, hard trance, house
- Instrument: Synthesizer
- Years active: 1995–present
- Label: EDM Records

Christian Scharnweber (born 1972) is a German electronic music producer and DJ. He records under the name DJ Mellow D and Mellow Trax; it is under this name that he had his hits.

His first song, Phuture Vibes, was a domestic hit, charting at #15 on the Austrian Singles Chart. However, his next song, "Outa Space", was an international smash, charting at #14 in Austria as well as #42 in Switzerland, #27 in France, #41 on the UK Singles Chart and #43 on the Hot Dance Music/Maxi-Singles Sales chart in the US. His final hit, coming two years later, was a remix of Shaft's "(Mucho Mambo) Sway", which charted at #43 in Austria.

== Discography ==
Artist	Title	Chart positions						Year
Artist	Title	GER	AUT	FRA	SWI	UK	US	Year
Mellow Trax	"Phuture Vibes"	9	15					1999
Mellow Trax	"Outa Space"	10	14	27	42	41	43	1999
Mellow Trax vs. Shaft	"(Mucho Mambo) Sway"	25	43					2001
