= End Is Forever =

Studio album by The Ataris
- Released: February 20, 2001
- Recorded: June–July 2000
- Studio: The Blasting Room, Fort Collins, Colorado; Orange Whip and The Crank Lab, Santa Barbara, California
- Genre: Pop punk
- Length: 41:01
- Label: Kung Fu
- Producer: Joey Cape, Jason Livermore

The Ataris chronology
Blue Skies, Broken Hearts...Next 12 Exits (1999)	End Is Forever (2001)	So Long, Astoria (2003)

End Is Forever is the third studio album by American rock band The Ataris, released on Kung-Fu Records in 2001. The album features a mix of punk and pop punk similar to the band's previous works along with catchy pop rhythms. It contains lyrics that span nostalgia, growing up, love, relationships, and singer Kris Roe's childhood. End is Forever is notable for its many pop culture references and numerous lyrics that Roe describes as having "hidden meanings" encoded within.

== Background and production ==
In April 1999, the Ataris released their second studio album Blue Skies, Broken Hearts...Next 12 Exits. They promoted the album with tours alongside Blink-182, Home Grown, and MxPx. In April 2000, the band released a split album with Useless ID. Between June 15 and July 20, 2000, the band recorded End Is Forever at The Blasting Room in Fort Collins, Colorado, with producers Joey Cape and Jason Livermore. Additional recording was held at Orange Whip and The Crank Lab, both in Santa Barbara, California with additional production from Angus Cooke.

== Composition ==
Musically, the sound of End Is Forever has been described as pop punk, with themes revolving around Roe's relationships, and being lonely while on tour. Roe considered it "a little bit more dynamic" than their previous album, with "a little bit more intricate" song structures, incorporating the use of cello and piano. The opening track "Giving Up on Love" channels the style of the Foo Fighters. "Up, Up, Down, Down, Left, Right, Left, Right, B, A, Start" talks about staying young; its title is a reference to a cheat code from the video game Contra (1987). "Song for a Mix Tape" incorporates country blues guitar licks within its pop-punk chord progression. "How I Spent My Summer Vacation" was originally included on the split with Useless ID; it was re-recorded for inclusion on End Is Forever. "Teenage Riot" features references to "Longview" (1994) by Green Day, and "West End Riot" (1999) by the Living End. "Song #13" is about turning the other cheek when someone says disparaging comments about another person. The album closes with the acoustic song "Hello and Goodbye".

== Release ==
The Ataris appeared on the second leg of the Fat Wreck tour, and performed on the east coast dates of the Warped Tour. In October 2000, the band supported the Vandals on their tour of the UK. On October 8, "Song #13" was made available for free download through the band's MP3.com profile. After initially being planned for released in October 2000, End Is Forever was eventually released on February 20, 2001, through Kung Fu Records. The Ataris held a release show for it at the band's own store Down on Haley; the music video for "Teenage Riot" was filmed at the show. The band toured Australia and then went to the UK. After returning to the US, they went on a tour with Lagwagon, and the Vandals. In April, the band played in Japan, before going to New Zealand, Australia and the UK; One Dollar Short appeared on the Australian dates.

After returning to the US in May, the band supported Blink-182 for a few shows. On June 18, the music video for "Summer Wind Was Always Our Song" was filmed at Down on Haley. At the end of the month, guitarist Marco Peña left the band amid to creative and personal differences; he was replaced by guitar tech John Collura, formerly of the band Beefcake. Following this, the band performed on the Warped Tour until August. Later in the month, the band played three shows in the UK as part of the Extreme 2001 festival. On August 27, the "Summer Wind Was Always Our Song" music video was posted on Kung Fu Records' website. Following the stint, the band played a few European festivals, before embarking on another US tour. In November and December, the band went on a west coast tour with All, before taking a break until early 2002.

== Reception ==
Professional ratings
Review scores
Source	Rating
AllMusic	4/5 stars
Chart Attack	Favorable
Drowned in Sound	6/10
Exclaim!	Favorable
Modern Fix	Favorable
Ox-Fanzine	Favorable
Sputnikmusic	6/10

The staff of Chart Attack wrote that End Is Forever "doesn't stray far from previous Ataris releases ... wrap[ing] melodies in chunky guitar riffs, working solid song arrangements with tight stop-start coordination." Modern Fix writer Michael Moriatis said the record was "more mature and definitely more produced, almost to a fault, than previous Ataris’ albums." Randy Flame of Ox-Fanzine found the album "[p]erfect both in the songwriting and in the production". Exclaim!'s Rob Ferraz said the band "serve up a tasty buffet of melancholy pop punk" with End Is Forever. He added, "[i]f you enjoy songs about heartbreak, falling in love and making mixed tapes for that special someone, then this is the record for you." Brian Kruger for Ink19 said the "playing, singing, and production are perfect. Too perfect, in fact. That’s what I don’t like about The Ataris — they’re too bright and shiny".

AllMusic reviewer Vincent Jeffries wrote that the band "offered up the dynamic, dangerously non-punk End Is Forever." He noted that listeners that knew the band's earlier works wouldn't be "surprised by End Is Forever as Roe's quickly developing, gifted writing had always been the outfit's defining factor". Mat Hocking of Drowned in Sound noted the lyrical themes of "girls, love, broken hearts, teen frustrations and er, girls", before asking, "[w]hich isn't really anything new is it?" He said that "[c]ompared to previous albums this is pretty average and a lot tamer". In a retrospective review, Sputnikmusic staff member Atari said the record was "their most consistent album to date." He added, "[i]t's an underappreciated and often overlooked album". Punk Planet reviewer Kyle Ryan said track three alone was "enough for me to give the Ataris a gold star of cleverness". Though, apart from this, the band managed to "pull [the pop punk sound] off occasionally, but they don't make it work the whole time".

It reached No. 14 on the Billboard Independent Albums chart and No. 24 on the Top Heatseekers chart.

== Track listing ==
All songs by Kris Roe, except "Giving Up on Love" by Roe and Jasin Thomason.

1. "Giving Up on Love" – 2:53
2. "Summer Wind Was Always Our Song" – 3:56
3. "I.O.U. One Galaxy" – 2:00
4. "Bad Case of Broken Heart" – 1:58
5. "Up, Up, Down, Down, Left, Right, Left, Right, B, A, Start" – 3:01
6. "Road Signs and Rock Songs" – 2:45
7. "If You Really Want to Hear About It..." – 2:45
8. "Fast Times at Drop-Out High" – 3:39
9. "Song for a Mix Tape" – 3:08
10. "You Need a Hug" – 3:49
11. "How I Spent My Summer Vacation" – 3:22
12. "Teenage Riot" – 2:58
13. "Song #13" – 2:25
14. "Hello and Goodbye" – 2:22

== Personnel ==
Personnel per booklet.

The Ataris

- Kris Roe – guitar, bass, vocals
- Mike Davenport – bass (credited but does not play on the record)
- Marco Peña – guitar (credited but he does not play on the record)
- Chris Knapp – drums

Additional musicians

- Angus Cooke – cello
- Todd Capps – piano, Moog, keyboards
- Zach Boddicker – pedal steel
- Jon Snodgrass – guitar
- Joey Cape – backing vocals

Production and design

- Joey Cape – producer
- Jason Livermore – producer
- Angus Cooke – additional production
- Sergie – artwork
- Kris Roe – photos, concept
- Dave Viorel – band photos

== Charts ==
Chart performance
Chart (2001)	Peak position
Australian Albums (ARIA)	81
UK Independent Albums (OCC)	42
US Heatseekers Albums (Billboard)	24
US Independent Albums (Billboard)	14
