= AJR discography =

AJR's Songs

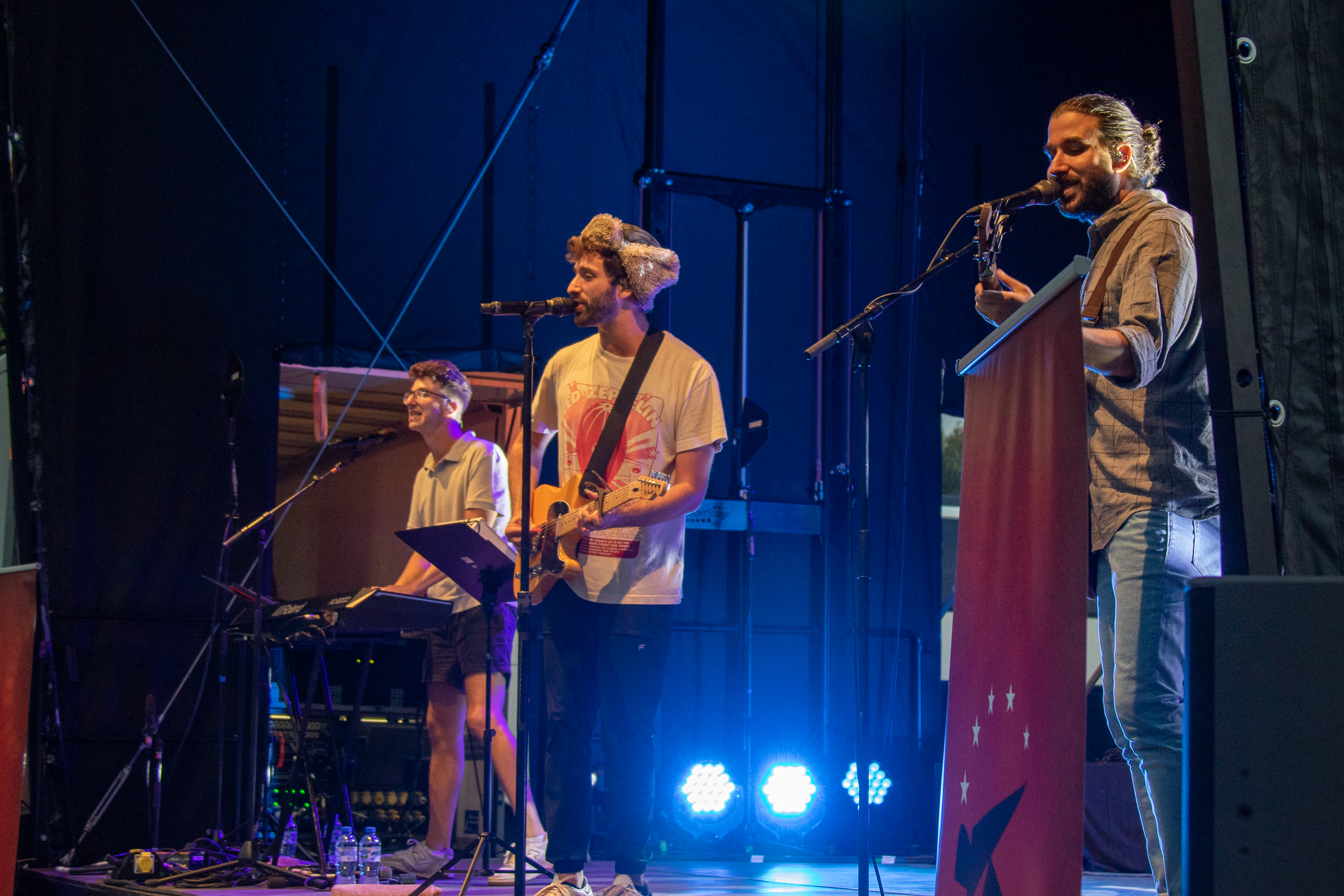
- AJR in 2023
- Studio albums: 5
- Live albums: 3
- Compilation albums: 1
- EPs: 4
- Remix EPs: 3
- Promotional singles: 8
- Singles: 21
- Music videos: 39

The discography of American indie pop trio AJR consists of five studio albums, eight extended plays, twenty-one singles, thirty-nine music videos, and eight promotional singles. The band is also featured on seven songs and have three independent releases.

== Studio albums ==
List of studio albums, with selected details, chart positions, and certifications
| Title | Album details | Peak chart positions | | | | | | Certifications |
| Title | Album details | US | US Indie | AUS DL | BEL (FL) | CAN | UK DL | Certifications |
|---|---|---|---|---|---|---|---|---|
| Living Room | Released: March 3, 2015; Label: Liberator Music, AJR Productions, Warner Bros.; Formats: Digital download, CD | — (Note: Living Room did not enter the US Billboard 200, but peaked at number 20 on the US Heatseekers Albums Chart.) | — | — | — | — | — | |
| The Click | Released: June 9, 2017; Label: AJR Productions; Formats: Digital download, CD, vinyl | 61 | 9 | — | 170 | — | — | RIAA: Platinum; BPI: Silver; MC: Gold |
| Neotheater | Released: April 26, 2019; Label: AJR Productions; Formats: Digital download, CD, vinyl | 8 | 1 | 49 | — | 95 | 47 | RIAA: Gold |
| OK Orchestra | Released: March 26, 2021; Label: AJR Productions; Formats: Digital download, CD, vinyl | 10 | 1 | — | — | 27 | 37 | RIAA: Gold; RMNZ: Gold |
| The Maybe Man | Released: November 10, 2023; Label: AJR Productions, Mercury; Formats: Digital download, CD, vinyl | 28 | — | — (Note: The Maybe Man did not enter the Australian Digital Albums chart, but peaked at number 2 on the Australian Hitseekers Albums Chart.) | — | — | 41 | |
"—" denotes releases that did not chart or were not released.

=== Live albums ===
List of live albums
| Title | Album details |
|---|---|
| Jam in the Van - AJR (Live Session, Los Angeles, CA, 2017) | Released: June 27, 2017; Label: Jam in the Van; Formats: Digital download |
| AJR: City Sessions | Released: January 26, 2024 (Amazon exclusive); Label: Mercury; Formats: Digital download |
| Live from the Hollywood Bowl | Released: March 27, 2026; Label: AJR Productions; Formats: Digital download, CD, vinyl |

=== Compilation albums ===
List of compilation albums
| Title | Album details |
|---|---|
| This Is My Imagination | Scheduled: December 4, 2026; Label: AJR Productions; Formats: Digital download, vinyl |

== EPs ==
List of extended plays with selected chart positions
| Title | EP details | Peak chart positions | |
| Title | EP details | US | US Heat |
|---|---|---|---|
| 6foot1 (Alternatively titled I'm Ready) | Released: December 20, 2013; Label: AJR Productions, Liberator Music; Formats: Digital download, CD | — | 32 |
| Infinity | Released: September 23, 2014; Label: AJR Productions, Warner Bros.; Formats: Digital download, CD | — | 36 |
| What Everyone's Thinking | Released: September 16, 2016; Label: S-Curve Records; Formats: Digital download, CD | 164 | — |
| What No One's Thinking | Released: September 5, 2025; Label: Mercury; Formats: Digital download | — | — |
"—" denotes releases that did not chart or were not released.

=== Remix EPs ===
List of remix extended plays
| Title | Album details |
|---|---|
| Weak Remixes | Released: May 5, 2017; Label: S-Curve Records; Formats: Digital download |
| Sober Up Remixes | Released: April 27, 2018; Label: S-Curve Records; Formats: Digital download |
| Bang! Remixes | Released: October 9, 2020; Label: Black Butter Records; Formats: Digital download |

== Miscellaneous ==
| Title | Album details | Notes |
|---|---|---|
| Born and Bred | Released: March 8, 2010; Label: LARJ Productions; Formats: CD, Digital download | see List of songs recorded by AJR |
| Venture | Released: September 12, 2010; Label: LARJ Productions; Formats: CD, Digital download | see List of songs recorded by AJR |
| AJR | Released: July 17, 2012; Label: Self-released | see List of songs recorded by AJR |

== Singles ==
=== As lead artist ===
List of singles released as a lead artist, with year released, chart positions, certifications, and album name
| Title | Year | Peak chart positions | | | | | | | | | | Certifications | Album |
| Title | Year | US | AUS | BEL (FL) | CAN | GER | IRE | NLD | NZ | UK | WW | Certifications | Album |
|---|---|---|---|---|---|---|---|---|---|---|---|---|---|
| "I'm Ready" | 2013 | 65 | 5 | — | — | — | — | — | — | — | — | RIAA: Platinum; ARIA: 3× Platinum; RMNZ: Gold | Living Room |
| "Infinity" | 2014 | — | — | — | — | — | — | — | — | — | — | | Living Room |
| "Let the Games Begin" | 2015 | — | — | — | — | — | — | — | — | — | — | | Non-album single |
| "Weak" | 2016 | 73 | — | 7 | 78 | 39 | 29 | 8 | — | 58 | — | RIAA: 4× Platinum; ARIA: Platinum; BEA: Platinum; BPI: Gold; BVMI: Platinum; MC: 2× Platinum; NVPI: Platinum; RMNZ: Platinum | The Click |
| "Drama" | 2017 | — | — | — (Note: "Drama" did not enter the Ultratop Top 50, but charted as an extra tip on the Ultratop Bubbling Under chart.) | — | — | — | — | — | — | — | | The Click |
| "Sober Up" (featuring Rivers Cuomo) | 2017 | — (Note: "Sober Up" did not enter the Billboard Hot 100, but peaked at number seven on the Bubbling Under Hot 100 chart.) | — | — | — | — (Note: "Sober Up" did not enter the German Singles Chart, but peaked at number 19 on the Deutsche Single Trend Chart.) | — | — | — | — | — | RIAA: 2× Platinum; ARIA: Gold; MC: Platinum | The Click |
| "Burn the House Down" | 2018 | 100 | — | — | 99 | — | — | — | — | — | — | RIAA: 3× Platinum; ARIA: Platinum; BPI: Silver; MC: 3× Platinum; RMNZ: Platinum | The Click (Deluxe Edition) |
| "100 Bad Days" | 2019 | — | — | — | — | — | — | — | — (Note: "100 Bad Days" did not enter the NZ Top 40 Singles Chart, but peaked at number 40 on the NZ Hot Singles Chart.) | — | — | RIAA: 2× Platinum; ARIA: Gold; MC: Platinum; RMNZ: Gold | Neotheater |
| "Dear Winter" | 2019 | — | — | — | — | — | — | — | — | — | — | | Neotheater |
| "Dear Winter 2.0" | 2019 | — | — | — | — | — | — | — | — | — | — | | Non-album single |
| "Bang!" | 2020 | 8 | 37 | — | 20 | — | — | — | 14 | — | 84 | RIAA: 4× Platinum; ARIA: 2× Platinum; BPI: Silver; MC: 2× Platinum; RMNZ: 3× Platinum | OK Orchestra |
| "Bummerland" | 2020 | — | — | — | — | — | — | — | — | — | — | | OK Orchestra |
| "Way Less Sad" | 2021 | 54 | — | — | — | — | — | — | — (Note: "Way Less Sad" did not enter the NZ Top 40 Singles Chart, but peaked at number 33 on the NZ Hot Singles Chart.) | — | — | RIAA: Platinum | OK Orchestra |
| "World's Smallest Violin" | 2021 | 91 | — | — | — | — | 79 | — | — | 75 | 189 | RIAA: Platinum; ARIA: Platinum; BPI: Silver; RMNZ: Gold | OK Orchestra |
| "I Won't" | 2022 | — | — | — | — | — | — | — | — (Note: "I Won't" did not enter the NZ Top 40 Singles Chart, but peaked at number 29 on the NZ Hot Singles Chart.) | — | — | | The Maybe Man |
| "The DJ Is Crying for Help" | 2022 | — | — | — | — | — | — | — | — (Note: "The DJ Is Crying for Help" did not enter the NZ Top 40 Singles Chart, but peaked at number 13 on the NZ Hot Singles Chart.) | — | — | | The Maybe Man |
| "The Dumb Song" | 2023 | — | — | — | — | — | — | — | — (Note: "The Dumb Song" did not enter the NZ Top 40 Singles Chart, but peaked at number 33 on the NZ Hot Singles Chart.) | — | — | | The Maybe Man |
| "God Is Really Real" | 2023 | — | — | — | — | — | — | — | — | — | — | | The Maybe Man |
| "Yes I'm a Mess" | 2023 | — | — | — | — | — | — | — | — (Note: "Yes I'm a Mess" did not enter the NZ Top 40 Singles Chart, but peaked at number 16 on the NZ Hot Singles Chart.) | — | — | | The Maybe Man |
| "Inertia" (acoustic) | 2024 | — | — | — | — | — | — | — | — | — | — | | Non-album single |
| "Betty" | 2025 | — (Note: "Betty" did not enter the Billboard Hot 100, but peaked at number 22 on the Alternative Airplay chart.) | — | — | — | — | — | — | — | — | — | | What No One's Thinking |
| "The Big Goodbye" | 2025 | — | — | — | — | — | — | — | — (Note: "The Big Goodbye" did not enter the NZ Top 40 Singles Chart, but peaked at number 25 on the NZ Hot Singles Chart.) | — | — | | What No One's Thinking |
"—" denotes a release that did not chart.

=== As featured artist ===
List of singles released as a featured artist, with year released and album name
| Title | Year | Peak chart positions | | | | | | | Certifications | Album |
| Title | Year | US AAA | US Adult | US Alt. | US Dance | US Pop | US Rock | CAN Rock | Certifications | Album |
|---|---|---|---|---|---|---|---|---|---|---|
| "The Lotto" (Ingrid Michaelson featuring AJR) | 2016 | — | — | — | — | — | — | — | | What Everyone's Thinking |
| "Celebrate" (Ingrid Michaelson featuring AJR) | 2017 | — | — | — | — | — | — | — | | Alter Egos |
| "Darlin'" (Mike Love featuring AJR) | 2017 | — | — | — | — | — | — | — | | Unleash the Love |
| "Pretender" (Steve Aoki featuring Lil Yachty and AJR) | 2018 | — | — | — | 24 | — | — | — | | Neon Future III |
| "All My Favorite Songs" (Weezer featuring AJR) | 2021 | — | — | — | — | — | — | — | | OK Human |
| "Record Player" (Daisy the Great featuring AJR) | 2021 | 24 | 36 | 20 | — | 39 | 21 | 44 | RIAA: Gold; MC: Gold | All You Need Is Time |
| "Too Late" (Quinn XCII featuring AJR) | 2023 | — | — | — | — | — | — | — | | The People's Champ |
"—" denotes a release that did not chart.

=== Promotional singles ===
List of promotional singles, with year released and album name
| Title | Year | Peak chart positions | | | | Certifications | Album |
| Title | Year | US Rock | CZ | GER DL | NZ Hot | Certifications | Album |
|---|---|---|---|---|---|---|---|
| "Growing Old on Bleecker Street" | 2013 | — | — | — | — | | Living Room |
| "Call My Dad" | 2015 | — | — | — | — | | The Click |
| "I'm Not Famous" | 2016 | — | — | — | — | | The Click |
| "It's On Us" | 2017 | — | — | — | — | | Non-album single |
| "Birthday Party" | 2019 | 29 | 17 | — | — | | Neotheater |
| "My Play" | 2020 | — | — | — | 40 | | OK Orchestra |
| "OK Overture" | 2021 | 44 | — | — | — | | OK Orchestra |
| "The Good Part" | 2022 | — | — | 49 | — | RIAA: Gold | The Click |
"—" denotes releases that did not chart or were not released.

== Other charted songs ==
List of other charted songs, with year released, chart positions, and album name
| Title | Year | Peak chart positions | | Certifications | Album |
| Title | Year | US Rock | NZ Hot | Certifications | Album |
|---|---|---|---|---|---|
| "Next Up Forever" | 2019 | 38 | — | | Neotheater |
| "Don't Throw Out My Legos" | 2019 | 26 | — | | Neotheater |
| "Karma" | 2019 | 36 | — | RIAA: Gold | Neotheater |
| "3 O'Clock Things" | 2021 | 28 | 39 | | OK Orchestra |
| "Maybe Man" | 2023 | 29 | — | | The Maybe Man |
| "Touchy Feely Fool" | 2023 | 30 | 40 | | The Maybe Man |
| "Inertia" | 2023 | 34 | — | | The Maybe Man |

== Music videos ==
List of music videos, showing year released and directors
| Title | Year | Director(s) |
|---|---|---|
| "Go On Take A Chance" | 2011 | Unknown |
| "I'm Ready" | 2013 | Or Paz and Tom Trager |
| "Infinity" | 2015 | Jason Merrin |
| "Overture" (Living Room) | 2015 | Jason Merrin |
| "Woody Allen" | 2015 | Adam Met, Jack Met, and Ryan Met |
| "Thirsty" | 2015 | Adam Met, Jack Met, and Ryan Met |
| "Call My Dad" | 2015 | Adam Met, Jack Met, Ryan Met, Leon Wu, and Nels Lindquist |
| "Let the Games Begin" | 2016 | Jason Merrin |
| "I'm Not Famous" | 2016 | Jason Merrin |
| "Weak" | 2017 | Shane Drake |
| "Overture" (The Click) | 2017 | Robert Quaintance |
| "Sober Up" | 2018 | Aaron A |
| "Come Hang Out" | 2018 | Ron Peters |
| "Burn the House Down" | 2018 | Justin Mitchell, Sarah Mitchell, and Spencer Hord |
| "Role Models" | 2018 | Spencer Hord |
| "Turning Out" | 2018 | Jack Met and Ryan Met |
| "100 Bad Days" | 2019 | Tim Nackashi |
| "Dear Winter" | 2019 | Adam Met, Jack Met, and Ryan Met |
| "Don't Throw Out My Legos" | 2019 | Adam Met, Jack Met, and Ryan Met |
| "Break My Face" (Apptronic Version) | 2019 | Amazon |
| "Bang!" | 2020 | Se Oh |
| "Bummerland" | 2020 | Edoardo Ranaboldo |
| "My Play" | 2020 | Jason Merrin |
| "Way Less Sad" | 2021 | Edoardo Ranaboldo |
| "OK Overture" | 2021 | Edoardo Ranaboldo |
| "World's Smallest Violin" | 2021 | Edoardo Ranaboldo |
| "3 O'Clock Things" | 2021 | Jack Met and Edoardo Ranaboldo |
| "Christmas in June" | 2021 | Edoardo Ranaboldo |
| "Record Player" | 2021 | Yuval Haker |
| "The Good Part" | 2021 | Edoardo Ranaboldo |
| "Ordinaryish People" | 2022 | Edoardo Ranaboldo |
| "I Won't" | 2022 | Patrick Tracy |
| "The DJ Is Crying for Help" | 2022 | Austin Roa |
| "The Dumb Song" | 2023 | Edoardo Ranaboldo and Austin Roa |
| "Yes I'm a Mess" | 2023 | Jack Met, Ryan Met, Adam Met, Austin Roa, Libby Sears, Pranav Arora, Cat Capps, Alba Avoricani, and Rob Piccione |
| "Maybe Man" | 2023 | Edoardo Ranaboldo |
| "Inertia" | 2023 | Edoardo Ranaboldo |
| "Touchy Feely Fool" | 2024 | Edoardo Ranaboldo |
| "Inertia" (acoustic) | 2024 | Austin Roa |
| "Betty" | 2025 | Edoardo Ranaboldo |
| "The Big Goodbye" | 2025 | Adam Met, Jack Met, and Ryan Met |

== See also ==
- List of songs recorded by AJR
