= List of songs recorded by AJR =

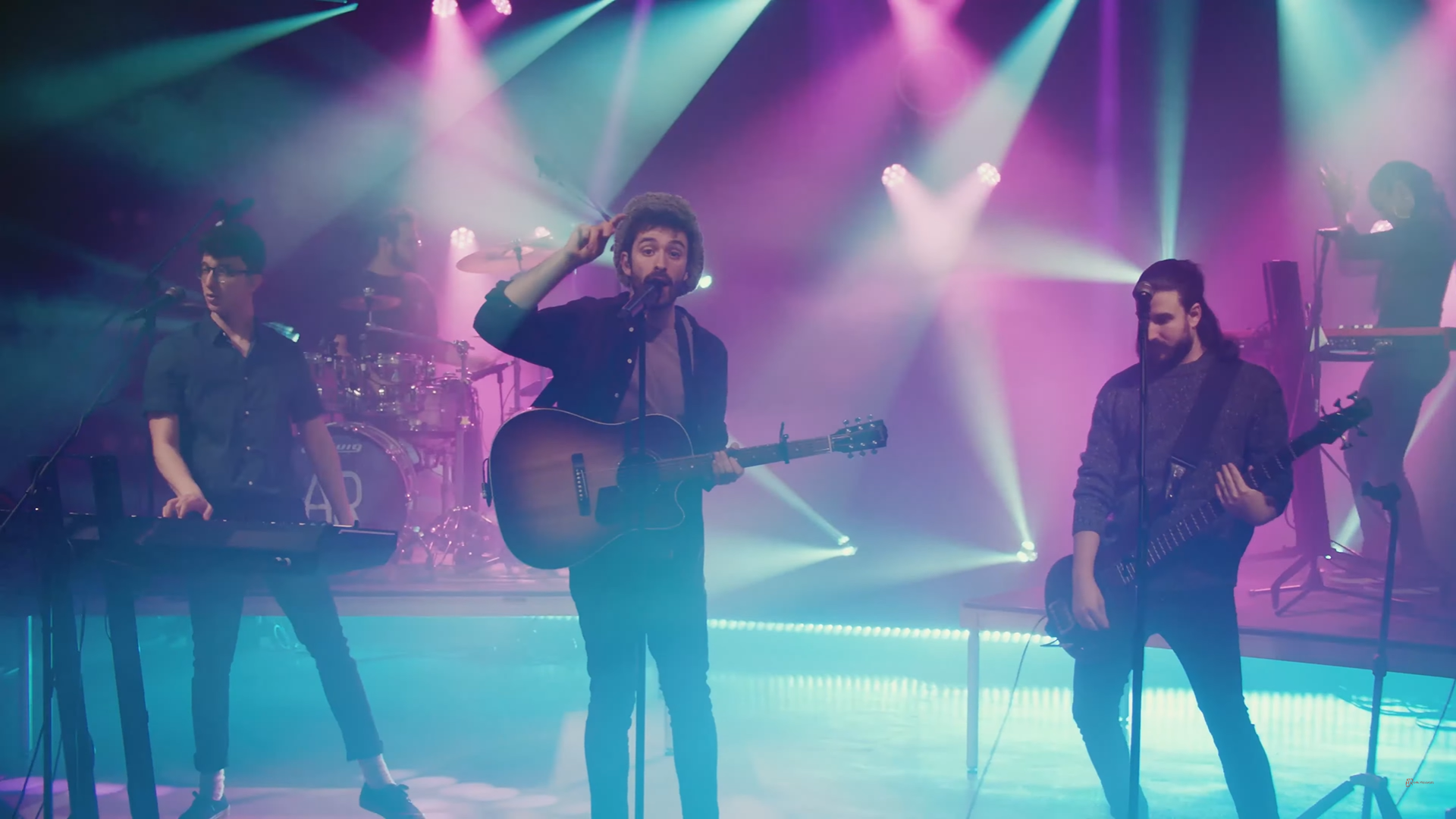
AJR at "We the People" in 2021

American indie pop band AJR has written or co-written every song in their discography, except various covers and two featured songs. The trio was formed by the brothers—Ryan Met (keyboard, ukulele, vocals), Jack Met (guitar, sampler, lead vocals), and Adam Met (bass guitar, backing vocals)—in Chelsea, Manhattan. Jack and Ryan are equally credited as songwriters on each track, although each have claimed individual authorship for various songs. Their musical style has remained consistent with pop music over the years, additionally incorporating elements of electropop, electronic dance music, and hip-hop. AJR has published 111 songs and 32 alternate versions, with additional songs and demos remaining unreleased.

== Released songs ==
†	Indicates song not written or co-written by AJR
‡	Indicates song retroactively made unavailable by AJR

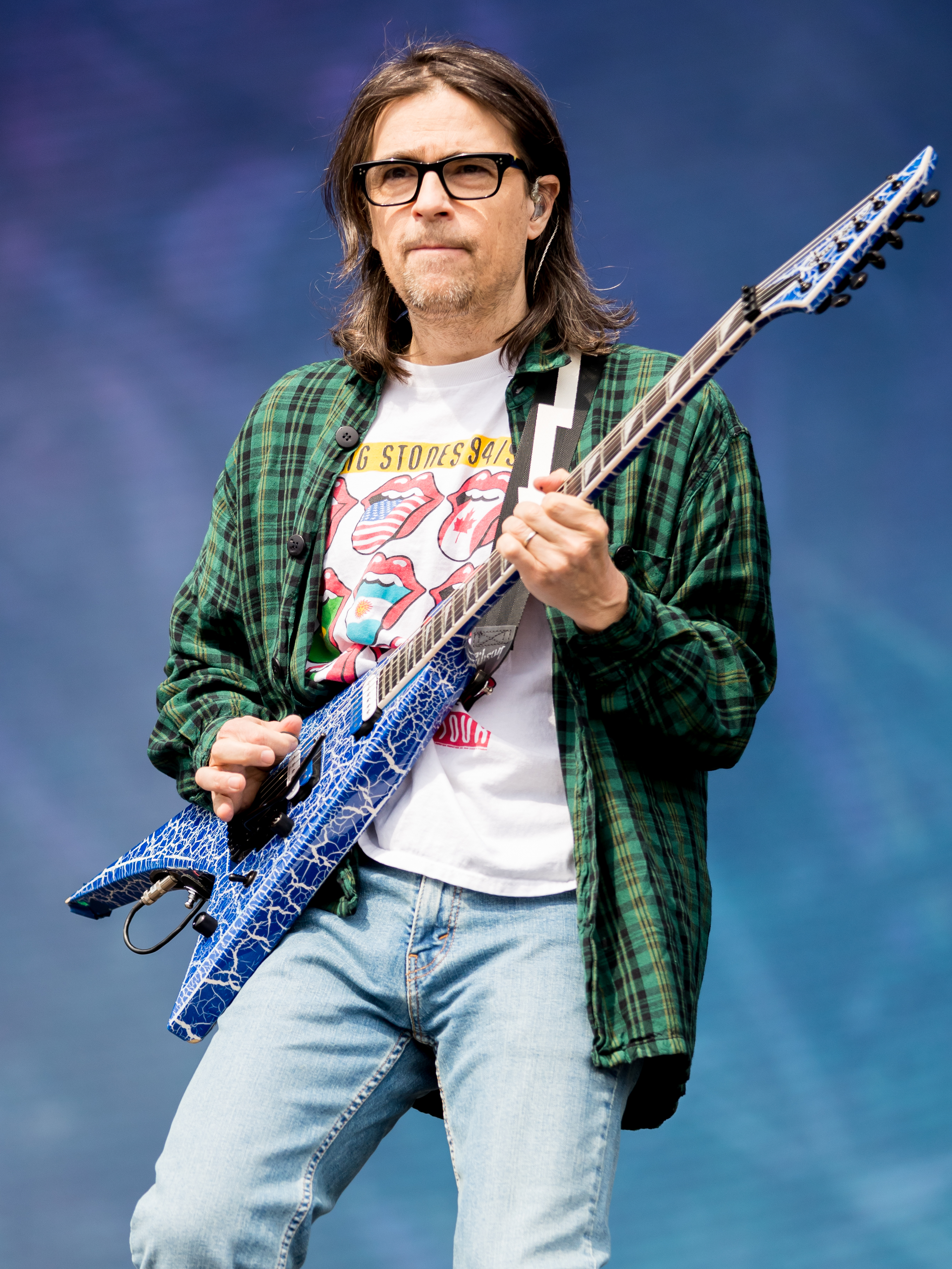
Rivers Cuomo co-wrote and featured on "Sober Up" (2017).

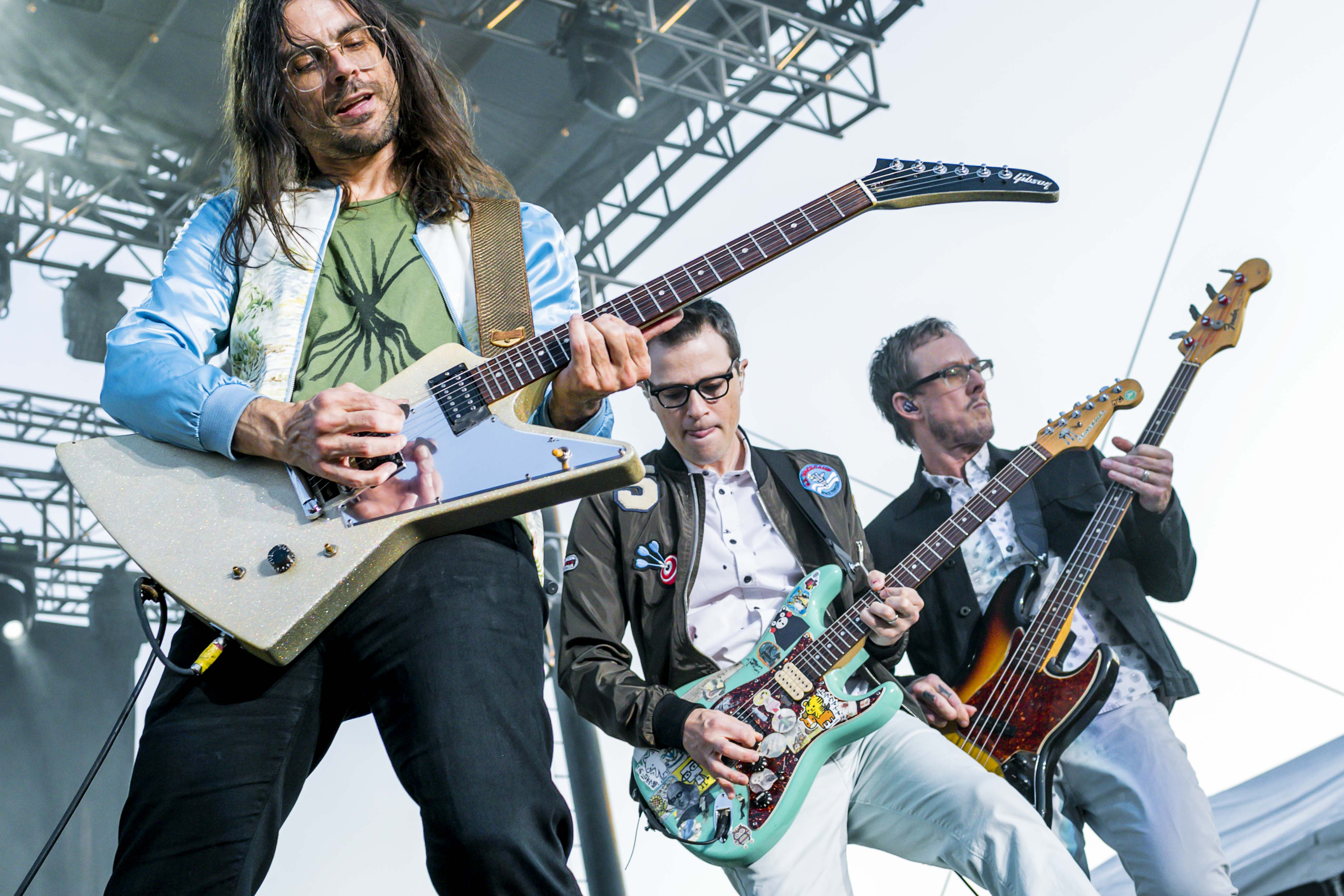
AJR featured on Weezer's "All My Favorite Songs" (2021).

List of released songs, showing title, writers, original release, and year
Title	Writers	Original release	Year	Ref.
"3 O'Clock Things"	AJR	OK Orchestra	2021	
"3AM"	AJR	Infinity	2014	
"50 States Away" ‡	AJR	Venture	2010	
"100 Bad Days"	AJR	Neotheater	2019	
"212" ‡	AJR	Venture	2010	
"2085"	AJR	The Maybe Man	2023	
"Adventure Is Out There"	AJR	OK Orchestra	2021	
"AfterHours"	AJR	6foot1	2013	
"Alice by the Hudson"	AJR	Infinity	2014	
"All My Favorite Songs" (Weezer featuring AJR)	Rivers Cuomo; Ashley Gorley; Ben Johnson; Ilsey Juber; AJR	OK Human	2021	
"Bang!"	AJR	OK Orchestra	2020	
"Beats"	AJR	Neotheater	2019	
"Betty"	AJR	What No One's Thinking	2025	
"The Big Goodbye"	AJR	What No One's Thinking	2025	
"Big Idea"	AJR	Living Room	2015	
"Big White Bed"	AJR	Living Room	2015	
"The Bigwhig" ‡	AJR	Venture	2010	
"Birthday Party"	AJR	Neotheater	2019	
"Boomtown" ‡	AJR	Venture	2010	
"Break My Face"	AJR	Neotheater	2019	
"Bud Like You"	AJR	The Click	2017	
"Bummerland"	AJR	OK Orchestra	2020	
"Burn the House Down"	AJR	The Click (Deluxe Edition)	2018	
"Buy You a Rose"	AJR	6foot1	2013	
"Call My Dad"	AJR	The Click	2015	
"Celebrate" (Ingrid Michaelson featuring AJR)	Ingrid Michaelson †	Alter Egos	2017	
"Chelsea Streets" ‡	AJR	Born and Bred	2010	
"Christmas in June"	AJR	OK Orchestra	2021	
"Classic" ‡	AJR	Bonus track of Born and Bred	2010	
"Come Hang Out"	AJR	What Everyone's Thinking	2016	
"Country House" ‡	AJR	Born and Bred	2010	
"Darlin'" (Mike Love featuring AJR)	Brian Wilson; Mike Love †	Unleash the Love	2017	
"Dear Winter"	AJR	Neotheater	2019	
"The DJ Is Crying for Help"	AJR	The Maybe Man	2022	
"A Dog Song"	AJR	What No One's Thinking	2025	
"Don't Throw Out My Legos"	AJR	Neotheater	2019	
"Drama"	AJR	The Click	2017	
"Drift Away" ‡	Mentor Williams †	Born and Bred	2010	
"The Dumb Song"	AJR	The Maybe Man	2023	
"The Entertainment's Here"	AJR	Neotheater	2019	
"Finale (Can't Wait to See What You Do Next)"	AJR	Neotheater	2019	
"Go On Take a Chance" ‡	AJR	Born and Bred	2010	
"God Is Really Real"	AJR	The Maybe Man	2023	
"The Good Part"	AJR	The Click	2017	
"The Green and the Town"	AJR	Living Room	2015	
"Growing Old on Bleecker Street"	AJR	6foot1	2013	
"Hallelujah" ‡	Leonard Cohen †	Born and Bred	2010	
"Hole in the Bottom of My Brain"	AJR	The Maybe Man	2023	
"Humpty Dumpty"	AJR	OK Orchestra	2021	
"I Want You Back" ‡	Berry Gordy; Freddie Perren; Alphonso Mizell; Deke Richards †	Born and Bred	2010	
"I Won't"	AJR	The Maybe Man	2022	
"I'm a Believer" ‡	Neil Diamond †	Born and Bred	2010	
"I'm Not Famous"	AJR	What Everyone's Thinking	2016	
"I'm Ready"	AJR	6foot1	2013	
"I'm Sorry You Went Crazy"	AJR	What No One's Thinking	2025	
"I've Just Seen a Face" ‡	John Lennon; Paul McCartney †	Born and Bred	2010	
"If U Were Me" ‡	AJR	Born and Bred	2010	
"Imagine" ‡	John Lennon; Yoko Ono †	Venture	2010	
"Inertia"	AJR	The Maybe Man	2023	
"Infinity"	AJR	Bonus track of 6foot1	2013	
"It's On Us"	AJR	Non-album single	2017	
"Joe"	AJR	OK Orchestra	2021	
"Karma"	AJR	Neotheater	2019	
"Let the Games Begin"	AJR	Non-album single	2015	
"Livin' on Love"	AJR	Bonus track of 6foot1	2013	
"Location" (Khalid cover)	Khalid Robinson; Joshua Scruggs; Austin Mensales; Chris McClenney; Samuel Jimenez; Olatunji Ige; Alfredo Gonzalez; Barjam Kurti†	B-side of "Drama"	2017	
"The Lotto" (with Ingrid Michaelson)	Ingrid Michaelson †	What Everyone's Thinking	2016	
"Mating Season"	AJR	Mating Season Official Soundtrack	2026	
"Maybe Man"	AJR	The Maybe Man	2023	
"A Moment Like This" ‡	AJR	Venture	2010	
"More Than Friends" ‡	AJR	AJR	2012	
"My Calling"	AJR	Living Room	2015	
"My Play"	AJR	OK Orchestra	2020	
"My Very First Love Song" ‡	AJR	Born and Bred	2010	
"Netflix Trip"	AJR	The Click	2017	
"Next Up Forever"	AJR	Neotheater	2019	
"No Grass Today"	AJR	What Everyone's Thinking	2016	
"Normal"	AJR	The Click (Deluxe Edition)	2018	
"Nothing in My Way" ‡	AJR	Born and Bred	2010	
"OK Overture"	AJR	OK Orchestra	2021	
"Ordinaryish People" (featuring Blue Man Group)	AJR; Jeff Quay	OK Orchestra	2021	
"Overture"	AJR	Living Room	2015	
"Overture"	AJR	The Click	2017	
"Piano in Your Pocket" ‡	AJR	Born and Bred	2010	
"Pitchfork Kids"	AJR	Infinity	2014	
"The Plane That Never Lands"	AJR	What No One's Thinking	2025	
"Pretender" (Steve Aoki featuring Lil Yachty and AJR)	AJR; Steve Aoki; Lil Yachty	Neon Future III	2018	
"Rainbow Man" ‡	AJR	Born and Bred	2010	
"Record Player" (Daisy the Great featuring AJR)	Kelley Dugan; Mina Walker; AJR	All You Need Is Time	2021	
"Role Models"	AJR	The Click (Deluxe Edition)	2018	
"Snow" ‡	AJR	Venture	2010	
"Snowglobe" ‡	AJR	AJR	2011	
"Sober Up" (featuring Rivers Cuomo)	AJR; Rivers Cuomo	The Click	2017	
"Steve's Going to London"	AJR	The Maybe Man	2023	
"Thirsty"	AJR	Living Room	2015	
"Three-Thirty"	AJR	The Click	2017	
"Too Late" (Quinn XCII featuring AJR)	Mikael Temrowski; AJR; Thomas Michel	The People's Champ	2023	
"Touchy Feely Fool"	AJR	The Maybe Man	2023	
"The Trick"	AJR	OK Orchestra	2021	
"Turning Out"	AJR	What Everyone's Thinking	2016	
"Turning Out Pt. ii"	AJR	Neotheater	2019	
"Turning Out Pt. iii"	AJR	The Maybe Man	2023	
"Way Less Sad"	AJR	OK Orchestra	2021	
"We the Cool Kids" ‡	AJR	AJR	2012	
"Weak"	AJR	What Everyone's Thinking	2016	
"Woody Allen"	AJR	6foot1	2013	
"The World is a Marble Heart"	AJR	AJR	2012	
"World's Smallest Violin"	AJR	OK Orchestra	2021	
"Wow, I'm Not Crazy"	AJR	Neotheater	2019	
"Yes I'm a Mess"	AJR	The Maybe Man	2023	
"You Can't Hurry Love" ‡	Brian Holland; Eddie Holland; Lamont Dozier †	Born and Bred	2010	

== Alternate versions ==
‡	Indicates identical performer to original

List of remixes and alternate recordings, showing title, performer(s), release, and year
Title	Performer(s)	Release	Year	Ref.
"Bang!" (Acoustic)	AJR ‡	Bang! Remixes	2020	
"Bang!" (featuring Hayley Kiyoko) [AhhHaa Remix]	AJR; Hayley Kiyoko; AhhHaa	Non-album single	2020	
"Bang!" (Nathan Dawe Remix)	AJR; Nathan Dawe	Bang! Remixes	2020	
"Bang!" (YouNotUs Remix)	AJR; YouNotUs	Non-album single	2020	
"Break My Face" (Apptronic version)	AJR ‡	Non-album single	2019	
"Come Hang Out" (Live Session, Los Angeles, CA, 2017)	AJR ‡	Jam in the Van - AJR	2017	
"Dear Winter 2.0"	AJR ‡	Non-album single	2019	
"The Good Part" (Amazon Music Live)	AJR ‡	AJR: City Sessions	2024	
"I'm Not Famous" (Live Session, Los Angeles, CA, 2017)	AJR ‡	Jam in the Van - AJR	2017	
"I'm Ready - Remix by AJR"	AJR ‡	Infinity	2014	
"Inertia" (Acoustic)	AJR ‡	Non-album single	2024	
"Pretender" (Acoustic)	AJR	The Click (Deluxe Edition)	2018	
"Pretender" (Blanke Remix)	Steve Aoki; Lil Yachty; AJR; Blanke	Pretender (Remixes)	2018	
"Pretender" (Matoma Remix)	Steve Aoki; Lil Yachty; AJR; Matoma	Pretender (Remixes)	2018	
"Pretender" (Steve Aoki & Max Styler Remix)	Steve Aoki; Lil Yachty; AJR; Max Styler	Pretender (Remixes)	2018	
"Sober Up" (Amazon Music Live)	AJR	AJR: City Sessions	2024	
"Sober Up" (Party Pupils Remix)	AJR; Rivers Cuomo; Party Pupils	Sober Up Remix EP	2018	
"Sober Up" (Ryan Riback Remix)	AJR; Rivers Cuomo; Ryan Riback	Sober Up Remix EP	2018	
"Sober Up" (Steve Aoki Remix)	AJR; Rivers Cuomo; Steve Aoki	Sober Up Remix EP	2018	
"Touchy Feely Fool" (Amazon Music Live)	AJR ‡	AJR: City Sessions	2024	
"Way Less Sad" (Cash Cash Remix)	AJR; Cash Cash	Non-album single	2021	
"Weak" (Acoustic)	AJR ‡	Weak Remixes EP	2017	
"Weak" (Cheat Codes Remix)	AJR; Cheat Codes	Weak Remixes EP	2017	
"Weak" (Gazzo Remix)	AJR; Gazzo	Weak Remixes EP	2017	
"Weak" (Live Session, Los Angeles, CA, 2017)	AJR ‡	Jam in the Van - AJR	2017	
"Weak" (Mike D Remix)	AJR; Mike D	Weak Remixes EP	2017	
"Weak" (Mike Rizzo Remix)	AJR; Mike Rizzo	Weak Remixes EP	2017	
"Weak" (Nicolas Julian Remix)	AJR; Nicolas Julian	Non-album single	2023	
"Weak" (Party Pupils Remix)	AJR; Party Pupils	Weak Remixes EP	2017	
"Weak" (Stay Strong Mix)	AJR; Louisa Johnson	Non-album single	2017	
"World's Smallest Violin" (Sped Up)	AJR ‡	Non-album single	2022	
"Yes I'm a Mess" (Amazon Music Live)	AJR ‡	AJR: City Sessions	2024	

== Unreleased songs ==
List of unreleased songs, showing title and details
Title	Details	Ref.
"Around the World"	Song heard in clips from Vine. The title is not confirmed.	
"A Brand New Day"	Presumed writer's demo, with its melody appearing in "Wish You Pain" by Andy Grammer. (where Jack and Ryan Met are credited).	
"Breakfast for Dinner"	Demo of "Burn the House Down", first demo.	
"Enjoy the Show"	Song written for a New York City creativity competition in 2016. The track is under two minutes in length.	
"Everything"	Demo of Netta's "Everything", written alongside Zara Larsson.	
"Fake It Till We Make It"	Demo of "Yes I'm a Mess", second demo.	
"Fisherman"	Presumed writer's demo.	
"Half Day"	Demo of "Burn the House Down", second demo.	
"Kill the Joke"	Demo of "OK Overture", originally written as a full song before being repurposed.	
"Let the Games Begin (Folk Version)"	Folk version of "Let the Games Begin".	
"Life Ain't Shit"	Demo of "2085".	
"Lucky Day"	Demo of "Yes I'm a Mess", third demo.	
"Married on a Hill"	Song written during the creation of Living Room (2015). It was performed live in 2013 and 2014, and accidentally published by Warner Music Group multiple times in 2020 before takedown.	
"Mercy"	Presumed writer's demo.	
"One Shot"	Song by American Authors, written and produced by Ryan Met.	
"Outside"	Demo of "Bummerland", composed during the Neotheater World Tour and written during the COVID-19 pandemic.	
"Planet"	Song made with Quinn XCII.	
"Schoolkids"	Song written during the creation of AJR (2012).	
"So What"	Demo of "Yes I'm a Mess", first demo, originally created for OK Orchestra (2021).	
"Socks"	Demo of "Adventure Is Out There", originally created for Neotheater (2019).	
"Somebody Pinch Me"	Demo of "Steve's Going to London".	
"Staying Up for Love"	Demo of Matoma and the Vamps' "Staying Up", featuring Jack singing.	
"Student Loans"	Demo of "Come Hang Out".	
"Waiting for the Beat to Drop"	Demo of "3 O'Clock Things" and "The DJ Is Crying for Help".	
"Way with Words"	Song written during the creation of The Maybe Man (2023).	
"We're on Our Way"	Demo with the same melody as "A Brand New Day".	
"Weak (Flipside Remix)"	Remix of "Weak". An extended version additionally exists.	
"Writer's Block"	Demo of "3 O'Clock Things".	
"Zoo"	Song by Andy Grammer, written and produced by Ryan Met.	

== See also ==
- AJR discography
