= Betty (AJR song) =

2025 single by AJR

Single by AJR

from the EP What No One's Thinking
- Released: July 9, 2025
- Genre: Pop; electropop
- Length: 2:43
- Label: AJR Productions
- Songwriters: Jack Met; Ryan Met
- Producer: Ryan Met

AJR singles chronology
"Inertia" (2023)	"Betty" (2025)	"The Big Goodbye" (2025)

Music video
- "Betty" on YouTube

"Betty" is a song by American pop band AJR. It was released on July 9, 2025, as the lead single of the band's fourth extended play What No One's Thinking.

== Background ==
AJR encountered a writer's block following their fifth studio album, The Maybe Man (2023). This led the band to attempt an opposite approach from their previous work, focusing more on the emotions they felt rather than their thoughts. They began writing a song in 2024, quickly finishing its composition but failing to achieve a gratifying lyrical result. Spontaneously, lead singer Jack Met later conceived the idea of writing about a fear of an indefinite commitment to something. The song was fully written within the day, with its demo being nearly the same as its final production.

== Release ==
On June 26, 2025, AJR posted a behind-the-scenes snippet of a music video for "Betty", simultaneously announcing its release as a single for July 9. The song made its live debut during a concert in China on June 29, followed on July 8 by a Jimmy Kimmel Live! performance. On the same day as the single, What No One's Thinking was announced and its tracklist was revealed, including "Betty" as the third of five songs. It was independently released via the band's label AJR Productions. The song appeared in setlists for AJR's Somewhere in the Sky Tour, performed between "The Good Part" and "100 Bad Days". "Betty" impacted modern rock radio in the United States, charting within the top 30.

== Music video ==
The music video for "Betty" was published alongside the single on July 9, 2025. Primarily using pixilation, Jack sets up equipment to film himself performing the song alone in an attic. He plays the guitar, keyboard, and drums, walks through landscapes made of household items, eats dinner surrounded by cardboard boxes, and walks in front of a green screen. Inspired by stop motion, AJR felt that a do it yourself style would accurately represent the song's theme. They incorporated the process of filming the music video into itself, similarly to their "How We Made" segments during tours, aiming to create relatability with their audience as something achievable by anyone. The band had the desire to create a video with pixilation for several years, but chose to save the occasion for a song with more acoustic instrumentation than their other works.

== Personnel ==
Credits adapted from Tidal.

- Jack Met – lead vocals, instruments
- Ryan Met – instruments, production, programming
- Joe Zook – mixing engineer

== Charts ==
Weekly chart performance for "Betty"
Chart (2025)	Peak position
US Alternative Airplay (Billboard)	22
US Rock & Alternative Airplay (Billboard)	40
