= Maybe Man =

2023 song by AJR

Song by AJR

from the album The Maybe Man
- Released: November 10, 2023
- Recorded: 2022–2023
- Length: 3:40
- Label: AJR; Mercury
- Songwriters: Jack Met; Adam Met; Ryan Met
- Producer: Ryan Met

Music video
- "Maybe Man" on YouTube

"Maybe Man" is a song by American pop band AJR from their fifth studio album The Maybe Man, appearing as the opening track. The song was released alongside a music video on November 10, 2023, the day of the album's release.

== Composition and lyrics ==
The song is composed in 4/4 time signature, with the first leg following a tempo of 145 beats per minute (BPM). "Maybe Man" musically builds as the song progresses, ending with a soft verse before a beat drop. The second leg of the song follows a tempo of 112 beats per minute (BPM), beginning with AJR's crew member Rob Piccione yelling "One, two, pandemonium".

Spanning 12 verses in length, "Maybe Man" acts as a table of contents for the rest of the album. Each verse of the song interpolates ideas from other songs on The Maybe Man, such as the seventh verse taking from "The DJ Is Crying for Help" and the eighth verse taking from "I Won't". This type of introduction differs from those of the band's previous albums, with Living Room, The Click, and OK Orchestra featuring sample-based overtures.

== Music video ==
An official video animated by Aaron Jasinski and directed by Edoardo Ranaboldo was released on November 10, 2023, alongside the album's release in the United States. The music video is painted, visually depicting Jack singing each verse of the song. The video ends with Jack running through various settings including a forest, a hospital, and the autumn landscape of their 2021 album OK Orchestra before flying into space. This scene was additionally used to promote the album's reveal on August 28, 2023.

=== Nominations ===
Year	Award	Category	Nominee(s)	Result	Ref.
2024	Berlin Music Video Awards	Best Animation	"Maybe Man"	Nominated	

== Personnel ==
Credits adapted from Tidal.

- Adam Met – vocals, instruments, composer
- Jack Met – lead vocals, instruments, composer
- Ryan Met – instruments, composer, producer, programming
- Dale Becker – mastering engineer
- Joe Zook – mixing engineer
- Rob Piccione – additional vocals, engineer
- Katie Harvey – assistant mastering engineer
- Noah McCorkle – assistant mastering engineer
- Brandon Hernandez – assistant mastering engineer
- Ruth Kornblatt-Stier – cello
- Arnetta Johnson – trumpet
- Emelia Suljic – violin
- Austin Roa – vocals
- Chris Berry – vocals
- Dane Hagen – vocals
- Ezra Donellan – vocals
- Josh Plotner – woodwinds

== Charts ==
Weekly chart performance for "Maybe Man"
Chart (2023)	Peak position
US Hot Rock & Alternative Songs (Billboard)	29
