= I Won't =

I Won't may refer to:

- "I Won't", a song by Akon from his 2004 album Trouble
- "I Won't", a song by Colbie Caillat from her 2009 album Breakthrough
- "I Won't", a song by Little Mix from the 2015 album Get Weird
- "I Won't", a song by H.E.R. from her 2017 self-titled album
- "I Won't" (song), by AJR from the 2023 album The Maybe Man
