= Border Crossings =

Border Crossings may refer to:

- Border Crossings (radio show), an all-request, music-oriented radio show broadcast by the Voice of America
- Border Crossings (magazine), a Canadian magazine about contemporary Canadian and international art and culture
- Border checkpoint
