= Touchy Feely Fool =

2023 song by AJR

Song by AJR

from the album The Maybe Man
- Released: November 10, 2023
- Recorded: 2022–2023
- Genre: Pop
- Length: 3:35
- Label: Mercury
- Songwriter(s): Jack Met; Adam Met; Ryan Met
- Producer(s): Ryan Met

Music video
- "Touchy Feely Fool" on YouTube

"Touchy Feely Fool" is a song by American pop band AJR, appearing as the second track on their fifth studio album The Maybe Man.

== Background ==
Throughout August and September 2023, AJR posted production snippets of "Touchy Feely Fool", later sending a studio-quality snippet of the song through their mailing list in October 2023. The full song became available through an event in collaboration with Rec Room on November 2, and officially released as the second track of The Maybe Man on November 10, 2023.

== Composition and lyrics ==
"Touchy Feely Fool" is composed in 4/4 time signature in the key of D major and follows a tempo of 163 beats per minute (bpm). The band's intention with the song was to "create atmosphere" with "vibey, synthy, and reverby" production. The song lyrically discusses wanting to get over an unsuccessful relationship.

== Music video ==
The music video for "Touchy Feely Fool" was released on January 23, 2024. It was directed by Edoardo Ranaboldo and filmed at Browder's Birds livestock farm in Mattituck, New York, in 4:3. The video depicts Jack Met lying on a couch with a dummy dressed as a psychiatrist sitting across from him. Jack proceeds to run, but a giant hand grabs him and puts him back on the couch. Jack reattempts to flee several times, with the hand grabbing him each time. Adam and Ryan appear throughout the video playing their instruments and not interacting directly with Jack. Eventually, Jack stops running and the giant hand is revealed to come from a titan version of him who also stops trying to grab him. Both walk back to the psychiatry setup with Jack lying on the couch and the giant version of him lying some distance away.

== Personnel ==
Credits adapted from Tidal.

- Adam Met – vocals, instruments, composer
- Jack Met – lead vocals, instruments, composer
- Ryan Met – instruments, composer, producer, programming
- Dale Becker – mastering engineer
- Joe Zook – mixing engineer
- Katie Harvey – assistant mastering engineer
- Noah McCorkle – assistant mastering engineer
- Brandon Hernandez – assistant mastering engineer

== Charts ==
Weekly chart performance for "Touchy Feely Fool"
Chart (2023)	Peak position
New Zealand Hot Singles (RMNZ)	40
US Hot Rock & Alternative Songs (Billboard)	30
