= Let the Games Begin (song) =

2015 single by AJR

Single by AJR
- Released: October 23, 2015
- Genre: Indie pop; dance-pop
- Length: 3:21
- Label: AJR Productions
- Songwriter(s): Adam Met; Jack Met; Ryan Met
- Producer(s): Ryan Met

AJR singles chronology
"Infinity" (2014)	"Let the Games Begin" (2015)	"Call My Dad" (2015)

Lyric video
- "Let the Games Begin" on YouTube

Music video
- "Let the Games Begin" on YouTube

"Let the Games Begin" is a song by American indie pop band AJR. It was released as an independent single via the band's label AJR Productions on October 23, 2015. A music video for the song was released in 2016.

== Background ==
AJR released their debut studio album Living Room on March 3, 2015. During the writing process of this album, the band additionally wrote material for their second album, citing an intention of different sound as their reason for not releasing the songs. One of these songs was titled "People Person", with various demos of the song taking inspiration from Irish music and dance music. After lead singer Jack Met incorporated the bugle call "First Call" into the song, the concept of "People Person" was combined with a sports theme, turning into "Let the Games Begin". Upon release, the song was anticipated to be the lead single of the band's second studio album, The Click, but was not included on any album. "Let the Games Begin" was additionally used for various Hasbro commercials.

== Composition and music video ==
"Let the Games Begin" begins with the bugle call, "First Call," which is additionally the track's chorus hook. The song is composed with upbeat electronic instrumentation and a prominent beat. "Spokestep" is featured in the bridge of "Let the Games Begin", which the band refers to as electronically manipulating and cutting up vocals in the style of dubstep.

A music video for "Let the Games Begin" was directed by Jason Merrin and released on February 25, 2016. The video follows the developing popularity of a costumed performer wearing a carrot costume, additionally cutting to the band performing the song in a grocery store.
