= God Is Really Real =

2023 single by AJR

Single by AJR

from the album The Maybe Man
- Released: July 5, 2023
- Recorded: 2022–2023
- Genre: Pop
- Length: 2:59
- Label: Mercury
- Songwriters: Jack Met; Adam Met; Ryan Met
- Producer: Ryan Met

AJR singles chronology
"The Dumb Song" (2023)	"God Is Really Real" (2023)	"Yes I'm a Mess" (2023)

Music video
- "God Is Really Real" on YouTube

"God Is Really Real" is a song by American pop band AJR. It was released by Mercury Records and serves as the eleventh track on the band's fifth studio album The Maybe Man. Despite not being planned as a single, the song, which is dedicated to the brothers' terminally ill father, was surprise-released to YouTube on July 3, 2023. The single was officially released on streaming services on July 5, 2023.

== Background ==
For over a year, AJR's father Gary Metzger battled cancer. His deteriorating health led the band to publicly announce his condition on July 1 through social media, with the band cancelling all of that month's planned concerts, including headlining Summerfest and later opening for Imagine Dragons. Gary died hours after the single's initial YouTube release on July 3, with the band giving an update before taking a temporary leave from social media. They claimed that they wanted the song to be available before he died.

== Composition ==
"God Is Really Real" is composed in 6/8 time signature in the key of F major and follows a tempo of 270 beats per minute (bpm).

Similarly to "Dear Winter" from the band's third studio album Neotheater, the song's sole instrument is an acoustic guitar, with "God Is Really Real" additionally having an orchestral backing.

== Lyric video ==
Two days before the single's official release date, a lyric video directed by AJR and edited by Austin Roa was released on July 3, 2023. The lyrics are handwritten by Ryan Met in a small notebook, with the band filming the video inside the hospital where their father was staying.

== Personnel ==
Credits adapted from Tidal.

- Adam Met – composer
- Jack Met – lead vocals, guitar, composer
- Ryan Met – composer, producer, programming
- Dale Becker – mastering engineer
- Katie Harvey – assistant mastering engineer
- Brandon Hernandez – assistant mastering engineer
- Noah McCorkle – assistant mastering engineer
- Rob Piccione – engineer
- Ruth Kornblatt-Stier – cello
- Emelia Suljic – violin
