= Yes I'm a Mess =

2023 single by AJR

- Album track list insert

Single by AJR

from the album The Maybe Man
- B-side: "Inertia"
- Released: September 29, 2023
- Recorded: 2020–2023
- Length: 2:44
- Label: Mercury
- Songwriter(s): Jack Met; Adam Met; Ryan Met
- Producer(s): Ryan Met

AJR singles chronology
"God Is Really Real" (2023)	"Yes I'm a Mess" (2023)	"Inertia" (2024)

Music video
- "Yes I'm A Mess" on YouTube

"Yes I'm a Mess" is a song by American pop band AJR. It was released on September 29, 2023, via Mercury Records as the fifth single from the band's fifth studio album The Maybe Man.

== Background ==
AJR began writing a concept for an "old western/hip hop" song, titling it "So What" and creating a demo on March 27, 2020. It was intended to be released on OK Orchestra, but was met with negative reactions from friends and family. The band wrote five more iterations before settling on "Yes I'm a Mess", with the lyrical idea of "throwing out your life, moving to another city, [and] just tak[ing] it from scratch".

The song first teased on YouTube on August 9, 2023, featuring an instrumental clip of the song with the band in Pula. More teasers were published on August 13, August 22, September 12, September 16, and September 22 before its release date was announced on September 25, 2023. "Yes I'm a Mess" was teased again on September 26 before releasing on September 29, 2023. In relation to the song being the last single of The Maybe Man before release, the band stated "we put absolutely everything we had into this album, visuals, and tour. Down to every little detail. Get ready to immerse yourself in this world".

== Composition ==
"Yes I'm a Mess" is composed in 4/4 time signature in the key of D minor and primarily follows a tempo of 92 beats per minute (BPM).

== Music video ==
A music video for "Yes I'm a Mess" was released on October 25, 2023, and was directed by Adam Met, Jack Met, Ryan Met, Austin Roa, Libby Sears, Pranav Arora, Cat Capps, Alba Avoricani, and Rob Piccione. The band claimed they spent three weeks attempting to produce a high-budget video that they found unsatisfactory, so they quickly filmed a low-budget video that they liked more. The video features Jack in Times Square dressed up as Elmo; later in the video, he ends up being chased by the NYPD due to a lack of permit.

== Personnel ==
AJR

- Adam Met – instruments, composer
- Jack Met – lead vocals, instruments, composer
- Ryan Met – instruments, composer, producer, programming

Additional personnel

- Dale Becker – mastering engineer
- Noah McCorkle – assistant mastering engineer
- Katie Harvey – assistant mastering engineer
- Rob Piccione – backing vocals, engineer
- The Beu Sisters – backing vocals
- Kent Lucas – backing vocals
- Ryan Chernin – backing vocals
- Ezra Donellan – backing vocals
- Joe Zook – mixing engineer

== Charts ==
=== Weekly charts ===
Weekly chart performance for "Yes I'm a Mess"
Chart (2023–2024)	Peak position
New Zealand Hot Singles (RMNZ)	16
US Adult Pop Airplay (Billboard)	26
US Alternative Airplay (Billboard)	11
US Hot Rock & Alternative Songs (Billboard)	24
US Pop Airplay (Billboard)	24
US Rock & Alternative Airplay (Billboard)	17

=== Year-end charts ===
Year-end chart performance for "Yes I'm a Mess"
Chart (2024)	Position
US Hot Rock & Alternative Songs (Billboard)	83
