= Inertia (song) =

2023 song by AJR

- Acoustic version cover

Single by AJR

from the album The Maybe Man
- Released: November 10, 2023
- Recorded: 2022–2023
- Genre: Pop
- Length: 3:40; 3:51 (acoustic)
- Label: Mercury
- Songwriters: Adam Met; Jack Met; Ryan Met
- Producer: Ryan Met

AJR singles chronology
"Yes I'm a Mess" (2023)	"Inertia" (2024)	"Betty" (2025)

Music video
- "Inertia" on YouTube

"Inertia" is a song by American pop band AJR. It appears as the fifth track on the band's fifth studio album, The Maybe Man, released on November 10, 2023 through Mercury Records. An acoustic recording of the song was later released as a single on May 24, 2024.

== Background and composition ==
In 2022, band member Ryan Met had a bank teller friend who often stated "but you know, inertia" in response to his own discontentment with his career. The song's melody and title were interpolated from this moment, with the hook being sung by Ryan and backing vocalist Cat Capps. The remainder of the song's vocals are led by Jack Met, who lyrically lists other life examples to which the scientific concept of inertia applies. "Inertia" is primarily composed in 6/8 time in the key of D-flat major at a tempo of 87.5 beats (175 beats in double time) per minute (bpm), changing to E-flat major during the final chorus. The song was released on November 10, 2023 as the fifth track of The Maybe Man.

== Music video ==
A music video for "Inertia", directed by Edoardo Ranaboldo, was released on November 29, 2023. The video features the band shrunken down and playing the song around comparably larger objects such as a piano, a book, beverages, and other common items, even a notebook with the song's lyrics written on it. This effect was achieved using a green screen to film the band and macro shots of the objects to alter their size appearance. The video received over a million views in under a month.

== Acoustic version ==
Shortly after the release of "Inertia", AJR published a short snippet of an acoustic performance on social media. Throughout early 2024, the band continued to release teaser videos featuring the recording. On May 21, the recording was announced to release on May 24, 2024, where it then became the album's sixth single.

== Personnel ==
Credits adapted from Tidal.

AJR

- Adam Met – bass guitar
- Jack Met – lead vocals, drums
- Ryan Met – instruments, production, programming

Technical

- Dale Becker – mastering engineer
- Joe Zook – mixing engineer
- Katie Harvey – assistant mastering engineer
- Noah McCorkle – assistant mastering engineer
- Brandon Hernandez – assistant mastering engineer

Additional musicians (Note: Original version only)

- Ariel Gendler – additional vocals
- Ruth Kornblatt-Stier – cello
- Emelia Suljic – violin
- Rob Piccione – engineer, backing vocals
- Dane Hagen – guitar, backing vocals
- Cat Capps – backing vocals
- Austin Roa – backing vocals
- Ezra Donellan – backing vocals
- Jabari Golding – backing vocals

"Inertia (Acoustic)"

- Adam Met – bass guitar
- Jack Met – lead vocals, acoustic guitar
- Ryan Met – instruments, production, programming
- Arnetta Johnson – trumpet
- Ginny Luke – strings

== Charts ==
Weekly chart performance for "Inertia"
Chart (2023)	Peak position
US Hot Rock & Alternative Songs (Billboard)	34
