= The Maybe Man =

Studio album by AJR
- Released: November 10, 2023
- Recorded: 2022–2023
- Genre: Pop
- Length: 44:12
- Labels: Mercury; Republic; AJR
- Producer: Ryan Met

AJR chronology
OK Orchestra (2021)	The Maybe Man (2023)	What No One's Thinking (2025)

Singles from The Maybe Man
- 1. "I Won't" Released: July 29, 2022; 2. "The DJ Is Crying for Help" Released: November 18, 2022; 3. "The Dumb Song" Released: April 21, 2023; 4. "God Is Really Real" Released: July 5, 2023; 5. "Yes I'm a Mess" Released: September 29, 2023; 6. "Inertia (Acoustic)" Released: May 24, 2024

The Maybe Man is the fifth studio album by the American pop trio AJR. It was released on November 10, 2023, following their previous studio album OK Orchestra (2021). It is the band's first and only album released as part of its deal with Mercury/Republic Records.

== Promotion and release ==
In 2022, AJR embarked on a world tour in support of their fourth studio album OK Orchestra. On the tour, they performed their then-unreleased song "I Won't" as a surprise addition to the set, before releasing it as the lead single for their upcoming fifth studio album on July 29, 2022. On November 12, 2022, AJR revealed the album title's abbreviation of "TMM", fitting into the pattern "T** M**** M**". Fans immediately started posting speculative potential titles on the internet; popular theories included "The Music Men", "Ten Meter Men", and "The Manly Men". The band released the album's second single "The DJ Is Crying for Help" on November 18. The third single "The Dumb Song" was released on April 21, 2023. Its music video was released the same day, detailing the song's year-and-a-half-long creation process.

The fourth single, "God Is Really Real", was surprise-released as a music video on YouTube on July 3, 2023, along with a lyric video. While the song was originally set to be released along with the album, it was released much earlier than originally scheduled, in order to commemorate the life of their terminally ill father Gary. He died later that day. The single had an official release on July 5, 2023.

On August 27, 2023, they posted the message "Enormous news tomorrow. maybe." to their social media accounts along with a previously unveiled logo featuring the "TMM" acronym. The album's full title and release date were announced the next day in a teaser video featuring the ending of the animated music video for the album's first track, "Maybe Man". The band revealed the track list and album cover on September 11.

The fifth and final single, "Yes I'm a Mess", was released on September 29, 2023. A comedic music video, shot in Times Square, was released on October 25. On October 11, AJR announced that The Maybe Man would be delayed exactly one week from its original release date, due to "exciting opportunities" relating to the album release. The album was then released on November 10 alongside a music video for "Maybe Man". On November 29, a music video for "Inertia", the 5th song on the album, was released. On January 23, 2024, a music video for "Touchy Feely Fool", the 2nd song on the album, was released.

== Track listing ==
All tracks are written by Ryan Met & Jack Met.

The Maybe Man track list
No.	Title	Length
1.	"Maybe Man"	3:40
2.	"Touchy Feely Fool"	3:35
3.	"Yes I'm a Mess"	2:44
4.	"The Dumb Song"	3:45
5.	"Inertia"	3:40
6.	"Turning Out Pt. iii"	3:50
7.	"Hole in the Bottom of My Brain"	3:07
8.	"The DJ Is Crying for Help"	3:39
9.	"I Won't"	2:48
10.	"Steve's Going to London"	4:47
11.	"God Is Really Real"	2:59
12.	"2085"	5:31
Total length:		44:12

== The Maybe Man Tour ==
The Maybe Man Tour
- Tour by AJR
- Location: United States & Asia
- Associated album: The Maybe Man
- Start date: April 3, 2024 (Note: The original date was April 2, 2024, but was cancelled due to the scope of the show being too much for the venue)
- End date: August 20, 2024
- Legs: 2
- No. of shows: 51
- Supporting act: Mxmtoon; Dean Lewis; Almost Monday; Andrew Hoyt
- Attendance: 450,000+
- Box office: $33.6 million

AJR concert chronology
- OK Orchestra Tour (2021–2022); The Maybe Man Tour (2024); Somewhere in the Sky Tour (2025)

On November 9, 2023, AJR announced their first arena tour to promote the album, most notably including two stops at Madison Square Garden (MSG) in New York City. Tickets for the tour went on sale on November 17. A second show for MSG was announced on November 14 due to the first show being sold out on the first day of presale.

On February 13, 2024, the band announced that the supporting acts for the tour would be Mxmtoon, Dean Lewis and Almost Monday. On April 1, AJR canceled the tour's first show due to the Norfolk Scope venue being too small to accommodate the show, announcing on April 11 that it was rescheduled to June 23.

Due to high demand, Idaho Central Arena announced on their Instagram account on April 2 that the Boise show would take place at ExtraMile Arena. The previously purchased tickets for Idaho Central Arena were shifted towards the newer venue, ensuring that the tickets were still valid.

On July 8, the concert scheduled to take place at Toyota Center the next day was canceled due to the safety concerns surrounding Hurricane Beryl.

On August 8, Adam Met announced that he would not be performing with the band for the Asia shows to attend the 2024 Democratic National Convention in Chicago.

As of August 2024, the tour has reportedly sold over 500,000 tickets.

=== Tour dates ===
The Maybe Man Tour dates
Date (2024)	City	Country	Venue	Attendance	Revenue	Opening act(s)
North America
~~April 2~~	Norfolk	United States	Norfolk Scope	Rescheduled (Note: Rescheduled to June 23, 2024)		
April 3	Philadelphia	United States	Wells Fargo Center	12,500/13,000	TBD	Dean Lewis
April 4	Boston	United States	TD Garden	14,000/15,000	TBD	Dean Lewis
April 6	Hartford	United States	XL Center	10,000/13,282	TBD	Dean Lewis
April 7	Baltimore	United States	CFG Bank Arena	TBD	TBD	Dean Lewis
April 9	Raleigh	United States	PNC Arena	TBD	TBD	Dean Lewis
April 10	Charlotte	United States	Spectrum Center	9,000/13,376	TBD	Dean Lewis
April 12	Indianapolis	United States	Gainbridge Fieldhouse	~11,000/12,000	TBD	Dean Lewis
April 13	Louisville	United States	KFC Yum! Center	TBD	TBD	Dean Lewis
April 14	Grand Rapids	United States	Van Andel Arena	10,000/10,000	TBD	Dean Lewis
April 16	Des Moines	United States	Wells Fargo Arena	4,500/6,000	TBD	Andrew Hoyt (Note: Hoyt replaced Dean Lewis, who did not perform after suffering a concussion.)
April 17	St. Paul	United States	Xcel Energy Center	12,000/13000	TBD	Dean Lewis
April 19	Kansas City	United States	T-Mobile Center	TBD	TBD	Dean Lewis
April 23	Boise	United States	ExtraMile Arena	5,000/6,795	TBD	Dean Lewis
April 24	Portland	United States	Moda Center	10,000/15,000	TBD	Dean Lewis
April 26	Seattle	United States	Climate Pledge Arena	13,000+	TBD	Dean Lewis
April 29	San Francisco	United States	Chase Center	11,000 / 11,000	TBD	Dean Lewis
May 1	San Diego	United States	Pechanga Arena	7,000/8,900	TBD	Dean Lewis
May 4	Oklahoma City	United States	Paycom Center	8,100 / 16,591	TBD	Dean Lewis
May 7	Austin	United States	Moody Center	9,000/10,000	TBD	Dean Lewis
May 9	Tampa	United States	Amalie Arena	TBD	TBD	Dean Lewis
May 10	Orlando	United States	Kia Center	TBD	TBD	Dean Lewis
May 12	Jacksonville	United States	VyStar Veterans Memorial Arena	6,000/8,000	TBD	Dean Lewis
May 14	Hollywood	United States	Hard Rock Live	4,000/7,000	TBD	Dean Lewis
June 23	Norfolk	United States	Norfolk Scope	7,000/8,000	TBD	Almost Monday
June 25	Pittsburgh	United States	PPG Paints Arena	~11,000/13,380	TBD	mxmtoon and Almost Monday
June 27	Cleveland	United States	Rocket Mortgage FieldHouse	~10,000	TBD	mxmtoon and Almost Monday
June 28	Columbus	United States	Nationwide Arena	TBD	TBD	mxmtoon and Almost Monday
June 29	Chicago	United States	Allstate Arena	11,000/12,000	TBD	mxmtoon and Almost Monday
June 30	Detroit	United States	Little Caesars Arena	13,000/15,000	TBD	mxmtoon and Almost Monday
July 3	Chicago	United States	Allstate Arena	11,000/12,000	TBD	mxmtoon and Almost Monday
July 4 (Note: Part of Summerfest)	Milwaukee	United States	American Family Insurance Amphitheater	12,500/23,037	TBD	mxmtoon and Carly Rae Jepsen
July 6	St. Louis	United States	Enterprise Center	11,000+/12,000	TBD	mxmtoon and Almost Monday
July 9	Houston	United States	Toyota Center	Cancelled	Cancelled	Cancelled
July 10	Fort Worth	United States	Dickies Arena	11,000	TBD	mxmtoon and Almost Monday
July 12	Phoenix	United States	Footprint Center	11,000/12,565	TBD	mxmtoon and Almost Monday
July 14	Los Angeles	United States	Kia Forum	12,000/17,500	TBD	mxmtoon and Almost Monday
July 16	Salt Lake City	United States	Delta Center	11,500/12,000	TBD	mxmtoon and Almost Monday
July 17	Salt Lake City	United States	Delta Center	11,500/12,000	TBD	mxmtoon and Almost Monday
July 18	Denver	United States	Ball Arena	11,500/13,000	TBD	mxmtoon and Almost Monday
July 20	Denver	United States	Ball Arena	11,500/13,000	TBD	mxmtoon and Almost Monday
July 21	Omaha	United States	CHI Health Center Omaha	10,000+/13,000	TBD	mxmtoon and Almost Monday
July 23	Cincinnati	United States	Heritage Bank Center	TBD	TBD	mxmtoon and Almost Monday
July 25	Philadelphia	United States	Wells Fargo Center	12,500/13,000	TBD	mxmtoon and Almost Monday
July 26	New York City	United States	Madison Square Garden	11,500	TBD	mxmtoon and Almost Monday
July 27	New York City	United States	Madison Square Garden	11,500	TBD	mxmtoon and Almost Monday
July 30	Atlanta	United States	State Farm Arena	12,000	TBD	mxmtoon and Almost Monday
July 31	Nashville	United States	Bridgestone Arena	TBD	TBD	mxmtoon and Almost Monday
August 2	Washington, D.C.	United States	Capital One Arena	TBD	TBD	mxmtoon and Almost Monday
August 3	Boston	United States	TD Garden	14,000/15,000	TBD	mxmtoon and Almost Monday
Asia
August 20	Seoul	South Korea	Jamsil Arena	8,000 / 8,000	TBD	None

=== Festivals ===
Festival Shows
Date (2024 - 2025)	City	Country	Venue	Attendance	Revenue	Opening Act of performance
Asia
August 17 (Note: Part of Summer Sonic Festival)	Osaka	Japan	Osaka Sonic Stage	TBD		None
August 18	Chiba	Japan	Tokyo Sonic Stage	TBD		None

=== Set list ===
1. "Maybe Man"
2. "Sober Up"
3. "Yes I'm a Mess"
4. "I Won't" / "Birthday Party"
5. "The DJ Is Crying For Help"
6. "God Is Really Real"
7. "The Good Part"
8. "Bang!"
9. "Inertia"
10. "Touchy Feely Fool"
11. "Karma"
12. "Turning Out" / "Turning Out Pt. ii" / "Turning Out Pt. iii"
13. "World's Smallest Violin"
14. "Steve's Going To London"
15. "Burn The House Down"
16. How We Made / "Way Less Sad"
17. "Don't Throw Out My Legos" (The Dumb Song for certain shows in the second leg and venues where they played twice)
18. "100 Bad Days"

==== Encore ====
1. "Weak" / "2085"

==== Alterations ====
- Due to Adam not being present at the Asia shows and other reasons, the beginning of "The Maybe Man", "God Is Really Real", and "2085" were cut. "Bang!", with the How We Made intro, was moved to prior "Weak", which had a marching band outro. and "The Dumb Song" was played.
- At the Japan shows, covers of "All Star" and "I've Got No Strings" were played.

== Reception ==
The Maybe Man ratings
Review scores
Source	Rating
Spectrum Culture	1.5/5 stars
AllMusic	3.5/5 stars
The Orcale	4.3/5 stars

Much like the band's previous albums, The Maybe Man was released to mixed reviews. Spectrum Culture's Thomas Stremfel criticized the album's lyricism, saying the album "barely scratch[es] the surface of the emotional depth their songs could achieve while insisting their music is nothing to take seriously." Writing for AllMusic, Matt Collar praised the album, writing, "With The Maybe Man, AJR continue to turn their personal pain and anxieties into universally relatable pop anthems." Exclaim! listed the album cover as 17th worst of the year, writing: "You've entered a wormhole to 2008 — your only tools for survival are a moustache finger tattoo, a copy of Amélie, a voucher for free puppetry lessons and this album cover. Good luck."

== Personnel ==
AJR

- Adam Met – bass guitar, vocals
- Jack Met – lead vocals (1–5, 7–12), guitar (tracks 2, 7, 10–12), drums (4 & 5), vocals
- Ryan Met – lead vocals (6), vocals, production, programming

Technical

- Dale Becker – mastering engineer (1–3, 5–7, 9–12)
- Chris Gehringer – mastering engineer (4, 8)
- Joe Zook – mixing engineer (1–3, 5–10, 12)
- Rob Piccione – engineer (1, 3, 5, 7, 9–12)
- Katie Harvey – assistant mastering engineer (1–3, 5–7, 9–12)
- Noah McCorkle – assistant mastering engineer (1–3, 5–7, 9–12)
- Brandon Hernandez – assistant mastering engineer (1, 2, 5–7, 9–12)

Additional musicians

- Rob Piccione – additional vocals (1), backing vocals (3, 8, 10), vocals (4, 5, 7, 9, 12), guitar (6)
- Ruth Kornblatt-Stier – cello (1, 5–7, 10–12)
- Emelia Suljic – violin (1, 5–7, 10–12)
- Arnetta Johnson – trumpet (1, 4, 10, 12)
- Chris Berry – vocals (1), drums (4), backing vocals (8), cello (12)
- Dane Hagen – vocals (1, 5), guitar (5), backing vocals (8)
- Ezra Donellan – vocals (1, 5), backing vocals (3, 8, 10)
- Austin Roa – vocals (1, 5, 12)
- Josh Plotner – woodwinds (1)
- The Beu Sisters – backing vocals (3)
- Kent Lucas – backing vocals (3), vocals (7)
- Ryan Chernin – backing vocals (3, 10)
- Chloe Brettholtz – additional vocals (4)
- Andrew Sobelsohn – guitar, vocals (4); backing vocals (8)
- Martin Lieberman – vocals (4), backing vocals (8)
- Cat Capps – vocals (4), additional vocals (5), backing vocals (8)
- Alba Avoricani – vocals (4), backing vocals (8)
- Honore Balan – vocals (4)
- Nell Balan – vocals (4)
- Ariel Gendler – vocals (5), backing vocals (8)
- Jabari Golding – vocals (5, 12)
- Zachary Murphy – vocals (7, 9)
- Benjamin Hostetler – vocals (7, 9)
- Eugene Mahlstadt – vocals (7)
- Katrina Udle – vocals (7)
- Natasha Bermudez – vocals (7)
- Adam Tomlinson – backing vocals, vocals (10)
- Amanda Wierbowski – backing vocals (10)
- Eric Holloway – vocals (10)
- Naia Lika – additional vocals (12)
- Daniel Cruz – vocals (12)
- Robert Hanley – vocals (12)
- Kevin Grammer – vocals (12)
- Jiliane Russo – vocals (12)
- Sarah Piccione – vocals (12)
- Kevin Urban – Intro Announcer (12)

== Charts ==
Chart performance for The Maybe Man
Chart (2023)	Peak position
Australian Hitseekers Albums (ARIA)	2
UK Album Downloads (Official Charts)	41
US Billboard 200	28
US Top Album Sales (Billboard)	9
US Top Alternative Albums (Billboard)	4
US Indie Store Album Sales (Billboard)	8
US Vinyl Albums (Billboard)	9
