= Border Crossings (radio show) =

Radio show broadcast on Voice of America

Border Crossings is a live, all-request, music-oriented radio show that is broadcast worldwide by the US government-operated Voice of America. Premiering on October 13, 1996, with Judy Massa as host, it is one of VOA's longest-running music programs, surpassed only by Willis Conover's jazz program (1955-1996), and "Country Hits USA" (airing continuously since 1984 and also originally hosted by Massa). Following Massa's retirement in 2001, Border Crossings was hosted by Ray Freeman until his retirement in 2004. The program is currently hosted by Larry London.
