= AJR =

American pop band

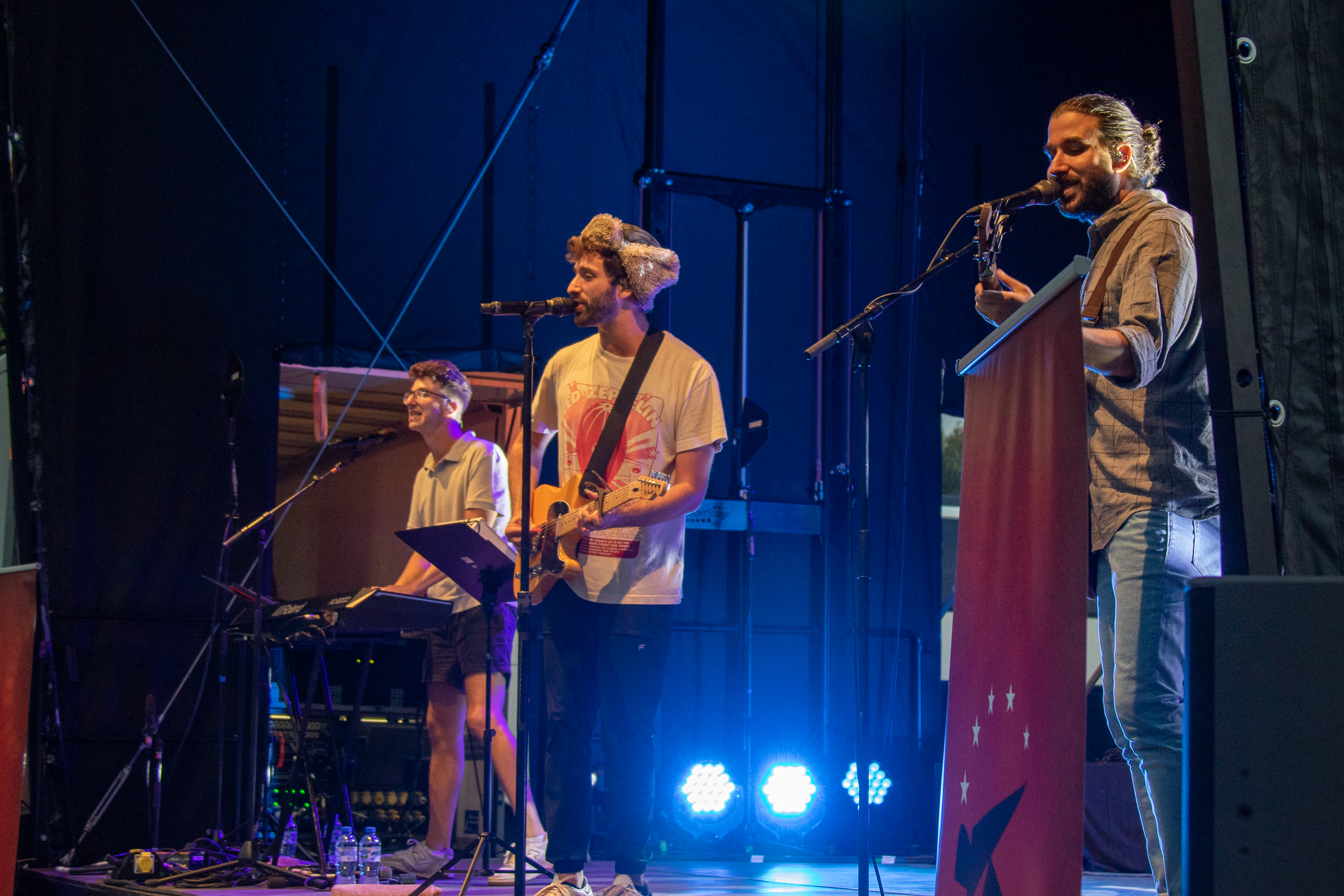
- AJR performing in 2023. From left to right: Ryan Met; Jack Met; Adam Met

Background information
- Origin: New York City, New York, U.S.
- Genres: Indie pop; electropop; orchestral pop
- Works: Discography; songs
- Years active: 2005–present
- Label: AJR Productions (Note: AJR Productions releases timeline intercorrelated releases in the same color and album releases in bold: 2013 / 6foot1; 2014 / I'm Ready; 2014 / Infinity; 2015 / Living Room (Warner Records); 2016 / What Everyone's Thinking; 2017 / The Click (S-Curve); 2018 / The Click (Deluxe Edition); 2019 / Neotheater (S-Curve/BMG); 2020: 2021 / OK Orchestra (BMG); 2022: 2023 / The Maybe Man (Mercury/Republic Records); 2024: 2025 / What No One's Thinking; 2026 / Live from the Hollywood Bowl)
- Members: Adam Met; Jack Met; Ryan Met
- Website: ajrbrothers.com

AJR is an American indie pop band by brothers Adam, Jack, and Ryan Met, collectively a trio of vocalists, multi-instrumentalists, and songwriters.

The band AJR was incepted in 2005, and the brothers performed locally until 2012—busking, tap dancing, and singing covers around New York City—their hometown, birthplace, and also the same study place for them, the three Columbia University alumni. With over 100 songs recorded, AJR wrote the lyrics and the melodies and has released five studio albums: Living Room (2015), The Click (2017), The Maybe Man (2023), and the two US Billboard 200 top-ten albums Neotheater (2019) and OK Orchestra (2021). The 2017 electropop platinum album contained their first Billboard Alternative number-one song "Sober Up" (featuring Rivers Cuomo). The 2021 orchestral pop gold album spawned their first Hot 100 top-ten single and also the Billboard Music Award Top Rock Song, "Bang!".

AJR is a multi-platinum band for having eight platinum singles, including the two aforementioned songs, "I'm Ready", "Weak", "Burn the House Down", "100 Bad Days", "Way Less Sad", and "World's Smallest Violin". All these songs accounted for an estimated nineteen million certified units of their total digital single sales in America. The band has become one of the 100 top-selling touring artists in 2024 and has completed seven headlining tours.

== Career ==
=== 2005–2013: Street performing and breakthrough with "I'm Ready" ===
Your early covers on YouTube were kind of what inspired me to get into making covers on my own ... your "Ho Hey" cover ... that was like one of the first covers that I saw that made me want to put out covers.

— Shawn Mendes

AJR, originally known as TB^{3} (Tapping Brothers to the Third Power), (Note: lit. 'Tapping Brothers to the Third Power'. It was also referenced in their music video "3 O'Clock Things".) began street performing in the parks of New York City in 2005. Prior to releasing original music, they posted covers of popular songs onto YouTube, under the username of AJRbrothers. Jack revealed in 2017 that their cover of "Ho Hey" by the Lumineers later inspired pop singer Shawn Mendes to perform his own covers. The brothers briefly considered calling themselves JAR, as well as other variations before settling on AJR, due to how easily it flowed. In 2012, AJR self-released their first and eponymous limited edition EP in CD format.

"She actually helped us get our start. About a year ago, she found us on Twitter, re-tweeted one of our videos, and met us for lunch. She introduced us to a lot of the people in the industry we’re working with now."

— Adam Met, 2013

In November 2012, Ryan tweeted a link to a video of their debut single, "I'm Ready", to about 80 celebrities, including Australian singer Sia. Sia told her manager about the song, and he contacted Steve Greenberg, former president of Columbia Records and current CEO and founder of S-Curve Records, who served as their manager. "I'm Ready", which features a sample of SpongeBob SquarePants repeatedly singing his catchphrase "I'm ready" from the eponymous animated series' premiere episode, was commercially released on August 22, 2013. The song was featured on their debut album Living Room, which was released on March 3, 2015, and reached number 20 on Billboard's Heatseekers Albums chart. The song was placed in regular rotation on Sirius XM Radio's Top 20 on 20 and Hits 1 stations, and they performed it on Good Day New York and VH1's Big Morning Buzz. The official music video for "I'm Ready" premiered on VEVO on October 15, 2013. It was certified Platinum in America and three times Platinum in Australia.

=== 2013–2015: EPs and Living Room ===
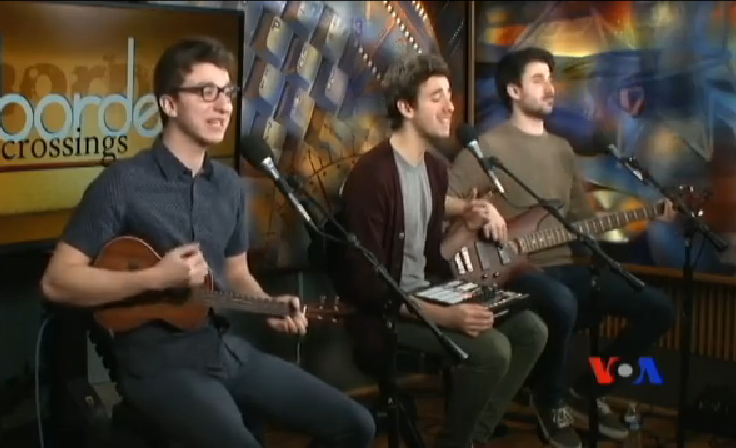
AJR on Border Crossings in 2015

AJR released their second EP, 6foot1, on December 20, 2013, later being re-released as the I'm Ready EP via Warner Music Group on March 25, 2014. They were named Clear Channel's "Artist on the Rise" for the month of October 2013. By 2014, the band was named iHeartRadio's Artist of the Month for Top 40 in January.

The band's third EP, Infinity, was released on September 22, 2014. It contains 5 tracks, including the lead single "Infinity". A lyric video directed and produced primarily by AJR was released for the single. The EP was released instead of their debut album, Living Room, which was pushed back to a release date of March 3, 2015. The band expressed the delay in their debut album was because they wanted to add some of their newer music to the project. On October 23, 2015, they released the individual single "Let the Games Begin".

=== 2016–2018: The Click ===
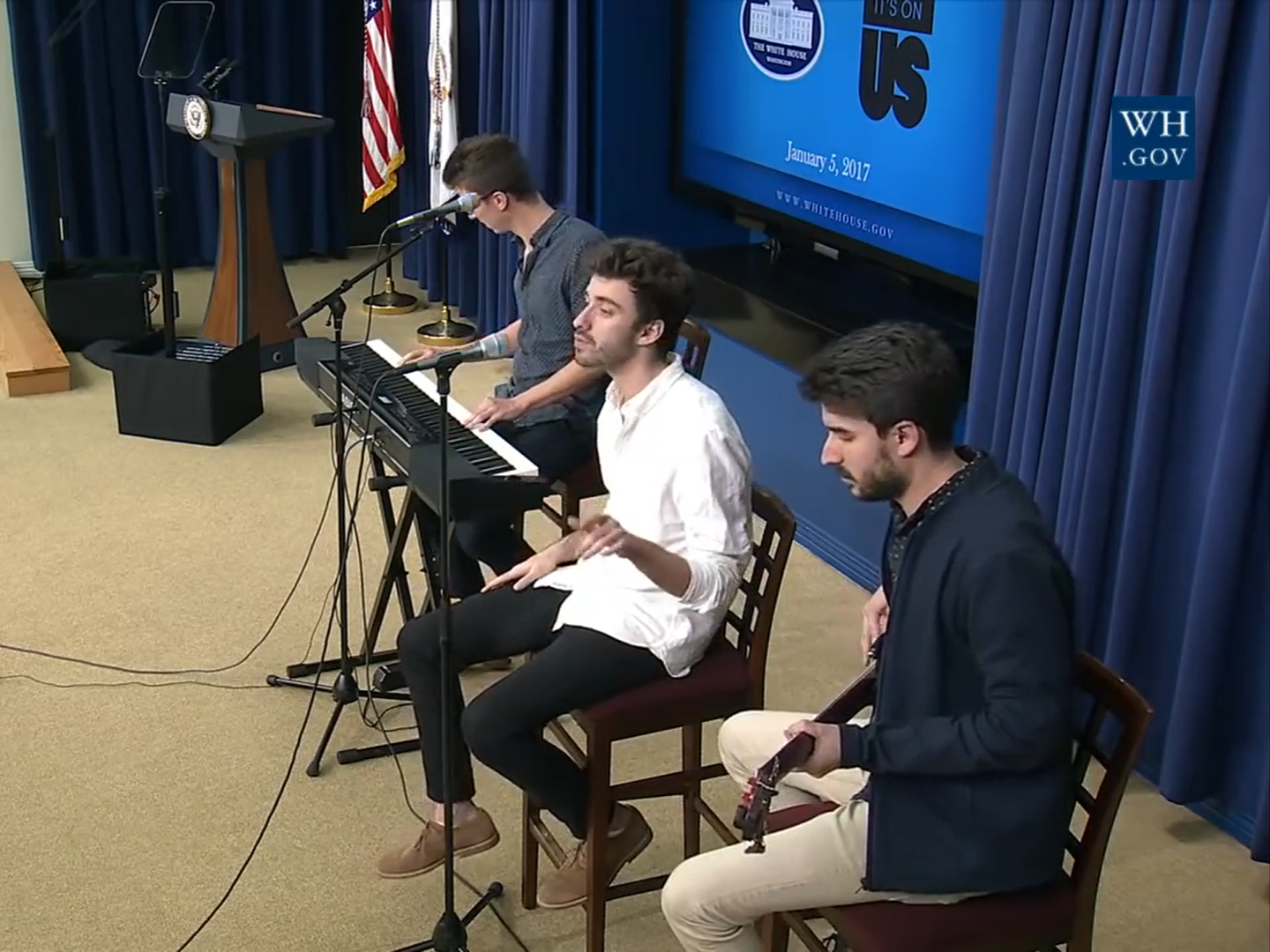
AJR performing "Turning Out" at the White House in 2017

On September 16, 2016, AJR released their fourth EP, titled What Everyone's Thinking. It was preceded by "I'm Not Famous" as a single earlier in the year, the EP also yielded their second Hot 100 single "Weak" and with that expanded their popularity to global mainstream, which charted in the Top 30 in over 25 countries worldwide and received Platinum certifications in Australia, Belgium, Canada, Germany, the Netherlands, and the US, additionally generating over 250 million streams on Spotify within its first year. All five tracks from What Everyone's Thinking were included on AJR's second studio album, The Click, which was released on June 9, 2017.

The album, on the AJR Productions label, was released by S-Curve Records in the United States, Ultra Records in Canada, and Black Butter Records in the rest of the world. "Drama" was released prior as the album's third single, while "Sober Up" became the fourth single upon the album's release. The latter featured Rivers Cuomo and became AJR's and Cuomo's first chart-topping song apart from his band Weezer; atop Billboard's Alternative Airplay chart for two weeks in 2018.

The Click primarily stayed within AJR's signature pop sound. It was inspired by Fun, Twenty One Pilots, Kanye West, and Kendrick Lamar, stylistically incorporating hip-hop, electronic dance music, and jazz. In support of the album, AJR announced the Click Tour in late 2017, which embarked through North America in 2018. The album amassed over two billion streams on Spotify, while the tour sold over 100,000 tickets, featuring Hundred Handed, Grizfolk, Ocean Park Standoff, MAX, and Robert DeLong as opening acts.

A deluxe version of The Click was released on September 21, 2018. The Click (Deluxe Edition) included three new tracks: "Burn the House Down", "Role Models", and "Normal". The former was released in March 2018 as a single, reaching number two on the Billboard Alternative Airplay chart. Also included was an acoustic recording of "Pretender", a collaboration from earlier in the year between AJR, EDM artist Steve Aoki and American rapper Lil Yachty. Due to a resurgence in popularity after four years, AJR released a music video for the album's second track, "The Good Part", on November 24, 2021.

=== 2019: Neotheater ===
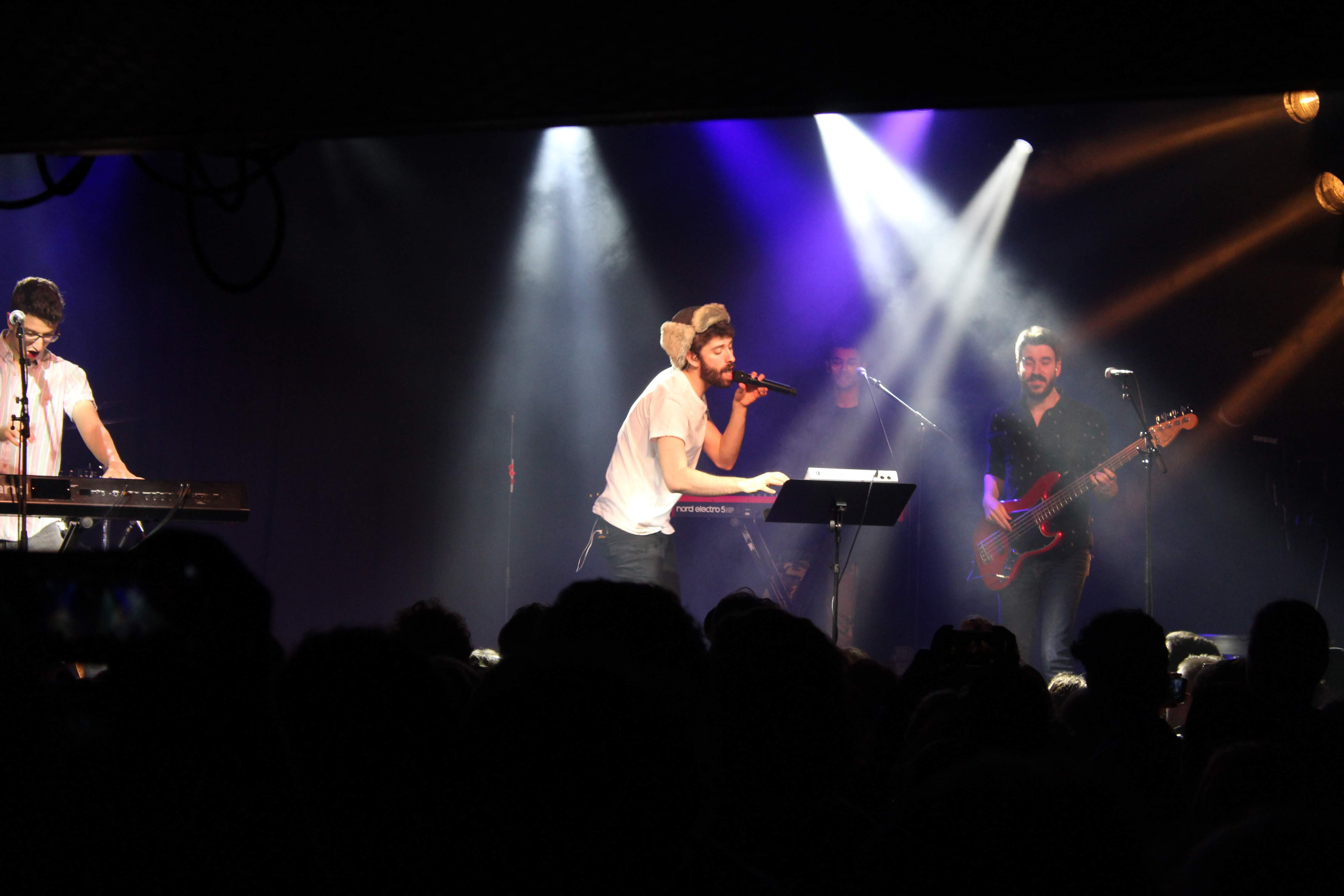
AJR performing in Amsterdam in 2019

On January 30, 2019, AJR released the song "100 Bad Days", which would later become the lead single for Neotheater. A music video for the single was released on March 7. The song was additionally included on Taylor Swift's Apple Music playlist, "Playlist by ME!", in May 2019, with the pre-chorus' lyrics being used for Taylor's description of the playlist of songs she loves and appreciates.

On March 10, the band announced their third studio album, Neotheater, which was to be released on April 26. On March 12, the promotional single "Birthday Party" was released and "100 Bad Days" was performed on Jimmy Kimmel Live!. The third single, "Dear Winter", was released on April 5 alongside a music video. After releasing on April 26, 2019, Neotheater debuted at number 8 on the US Billboard 200 and hit number one on Billboard's Top Rock Albums chart. A show for the Neotheater World Tour was later sold out at Red Rocks Amphitheatre on October 5, 2019.

On October 25, 2019, the group released "Dear Winter 2.0", re-imagining the song by "changing the production and upping the emotion".

=== 2020–2021: OK Orchestra ===
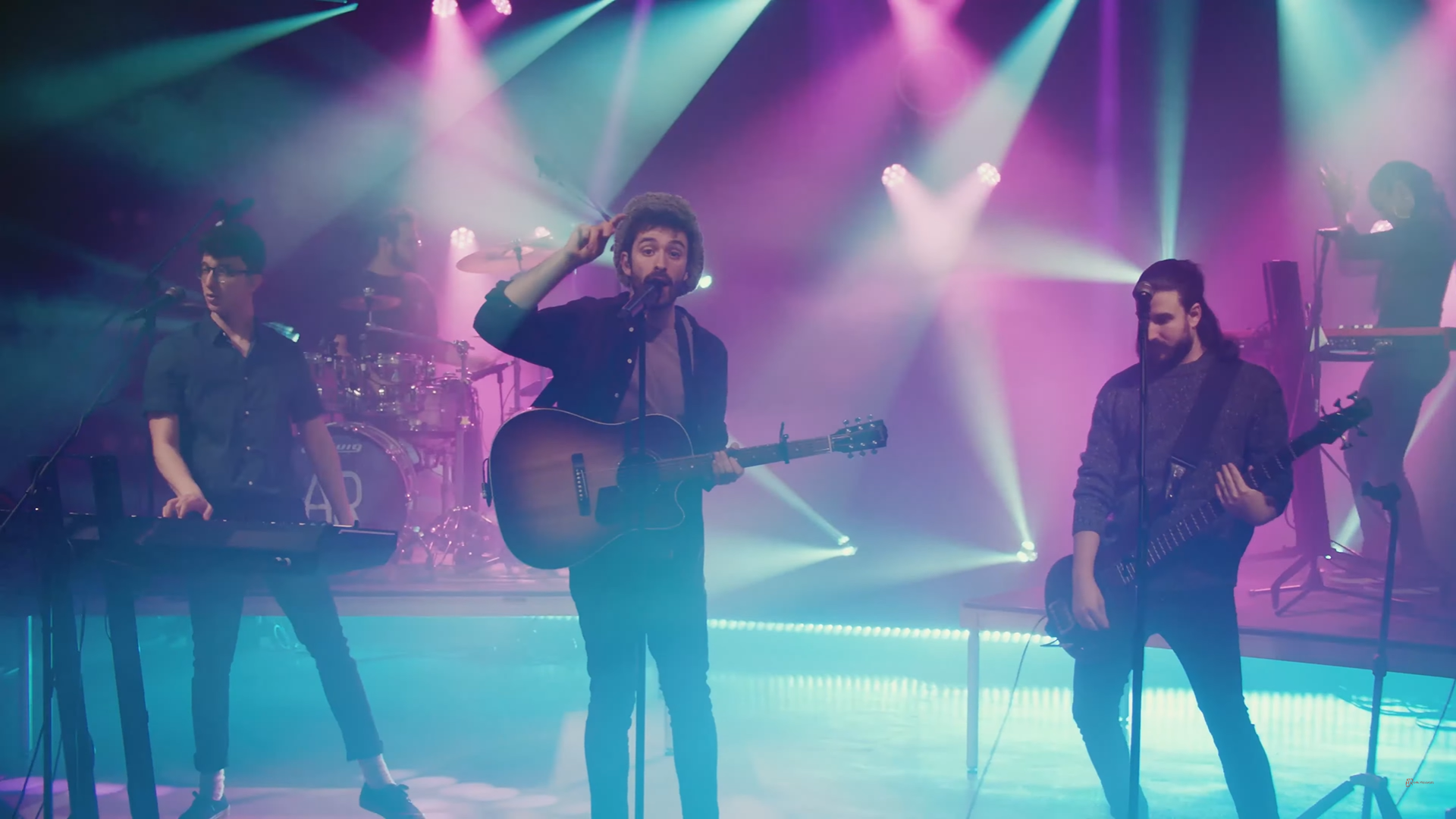
AJR performing "Bummerland" at "We the People" in 2021

"Bang!" was released as the lead single for the band's fourth studio album on February 12, 2020. The song charted in the Billboard Hot 100 at number eight, making it AJR's first and only Hot 100 top-ten single. The album's second single, "Bummerland", released on August 31, 2020, later being performed by the band at the virtual concert "We the People" on January 17, 2021, for the inauguration of the 46th United States president Joe Biden.

On December 22, 2020, AJR released "My Play" as the third single, followed by "Way Less Sad" as the fourth single on February 17, 2021. OK Orchestra was officially released on March 26, 2021, with the Blue Man Group featuring on its ninth track, "Ordinaryish People". At the 2021 Billboard Music Awards, "Bang!" received an award for winning "Top Rock Song", and they performed the song alongside "Way Less Sad".

Following the release of OK Orchestra, AJR collaborated with the American bands Weezer and Daisy the Great, releasing a remix of Weezer's "All My Favorite Songs" on May 12, 2021, and a remix of Daisy the Great's "Record Player" on August 31, 2021.

=== 2022–2024: The Maybe Man ===
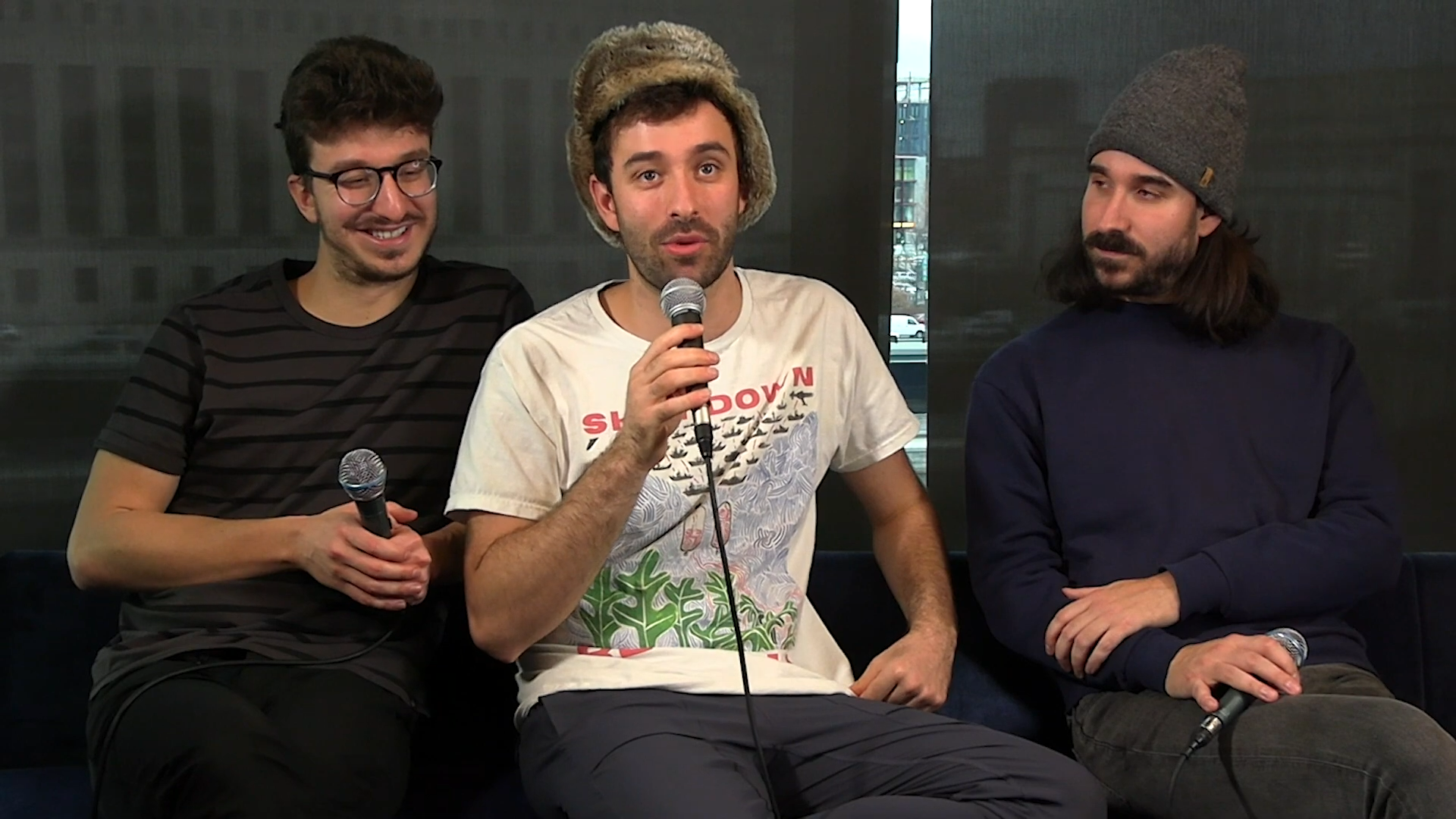
AJR on 96.5 TDY's interview in 2022

On April 22, 2022, the band announced that a new song would be released before the OK Orchestra Tour resumed. AJR signed to Mercury Records/Republic Records in May 2022, and officially released the song "I Won't" through the label on July 29 with an accompanying music video. On November 12, the band released a video teaser announcing their new album, abbreviated as TMM, and released the follow-up single "The DJ Is Crying for Help" on November 18. On January 27, 2023, Quinn XCII released "Too Late", featuring AJR. The song appeared as track 7 on Quinn's fifth studio album, The People's Champ. The single came after the cancellation of 2020's Everything Everywhere Tour, which both artists would have performed alongside each other.

On April 21, 2023, the band released the album's third single, "The Dumb Song". The next day, a music video was released detailing the events of the one-and-a-half-year-long process of creating the song. The band surprise released a lyric video for a new song titled "God Is Really Real" on July 3, detailing the brothers' relationship with their father, Gary, who was terminally ill at the time of its release. The band announced later that day that Gary had died. On August 28, AJR announced the album's title, The Maybe Man, with a release date of November 3. The album's track list and artwork was revealed on September 12, and the band released the fifth and final single from the album, "Yes I'm a Mess", on September 29, with a music video released on October 25. On October 11, 2023, AJR announced that the release date of The Maybe Man had been delayed by one week to November 10. On November 8, 2023, AJR announced The Maybe Man Tour, the band's first arena tour, beginning in 2024.

On May 24, 2024, the band released an acoustic version of the song "Inertia". The accompanying music video, filmed at VyStar Veterans Memorial Arena in Jacksonville, Florida, was released the day after. The video features AJR, Arnetta Johnson, and Ginny Luke sitting in one section of the arena, towards the front, with a spotlight on the band members.

On November 4, 2024, AJR released a YouTube video, called "AJR – The Making of The Maybe Man Tour" which details information about how the tour was created and rehearsed. The video features the band as well as several members of the tour's production. Directed by Austin Roa, a photographer/videographer for the band, the video shows the processes of lighting, sound design, and designing comedic parts of the show, as well as the finale.

=== 2025–present: What No One's Thinking ===
On January 7, 2025, the band announced that they would perform at the Sips and Sounds Festival in Austin, Texas on March 8, alongside other artists such as Halsey, Khalid, Benson Boone, and various others. In addition to the Sips and Sounds Festival, the band announced two days later that they would also be performing at the Houston Livestock Show and Rodeo in Houston, Texas on March 6. On March 14, the band announced the Somewhere in the Sky Tour, with special guests Cavetown, Goth Babe, Quinn XCII, Chelsea Cutler, Lawrence, Valley, Elio Mei, Ryley Tate Wilson, and Benjamin Steer.

On June 16, 2025, the band announced the What No One's Thinking EP, with a single and releasing on a later date. The EP is a spiritual successor to their 2016 EP What Everyone's Thinking. On July 9, the band released the single "Betty" and announced that the EP would be releasing on August 29, 2025. The band later announced on their Instagram page that the release was delayed to September 5, 2025, for further refinement. With the release of the EP, it was revealed that AJR had parted ways with Mercury/Republic Records and returned to being independent after their artist pages had disappeared from the label websites.

On December 10, 2025, the band announced their first live album Live at the Hollywood Bowl, a recording of their performance at the Hollywood Bowl during the Somewhere in the Sky Tour. The album would go on preorder the same day and release at a later date. In the same post announcing the album, AJR announced that they would be streaming the live performance on January 3, 2026. On January 28, AJR announced that the album would release on March 27. On February 13, the band released a single from the album "A Bunch of Songs We Haven't Played in a Long Time", a mashup consisting of "Come Hang Out", "I'm Not Famous", "I'm Ready", "Break My Face" and "Finale (Can't Wait to See What You Do Next)".

In March 2026, AJR announced The Northwest Tour to support their EP What No One's Thinking. Cities included in the tour were Idaho Falls, ID, Colorado Springs, CO, Bend, OR, and Nampa, ID. They also played several festivals in 2026, including BottleRock Napa Valley, San Diego County Fair, Iowa State Fair.

In May 2026, AJR released the song "Mating Season", to promote the Netflix animated series of the same name.

== Artistry ==
The brothers are all singer-songwriters themselves. Being known as a DIY band, they emphasize writing, producing, and mixing all of their own music collaboratively from their living room studio. AJR describes their musical style is a mixture of many different genres such as dubstep, doo-wop, hip-hop and theatrical musical like Broadway, whereas the band has been categorized as indie pop, and electropop. Their music has also been used as an example of "Theater Core", over-the-top theatrical music that aims to tell a narrative.

They also use a musical technique created by them, spokestep, in which vocals are cut up over the beat of the song.

== Band members ==
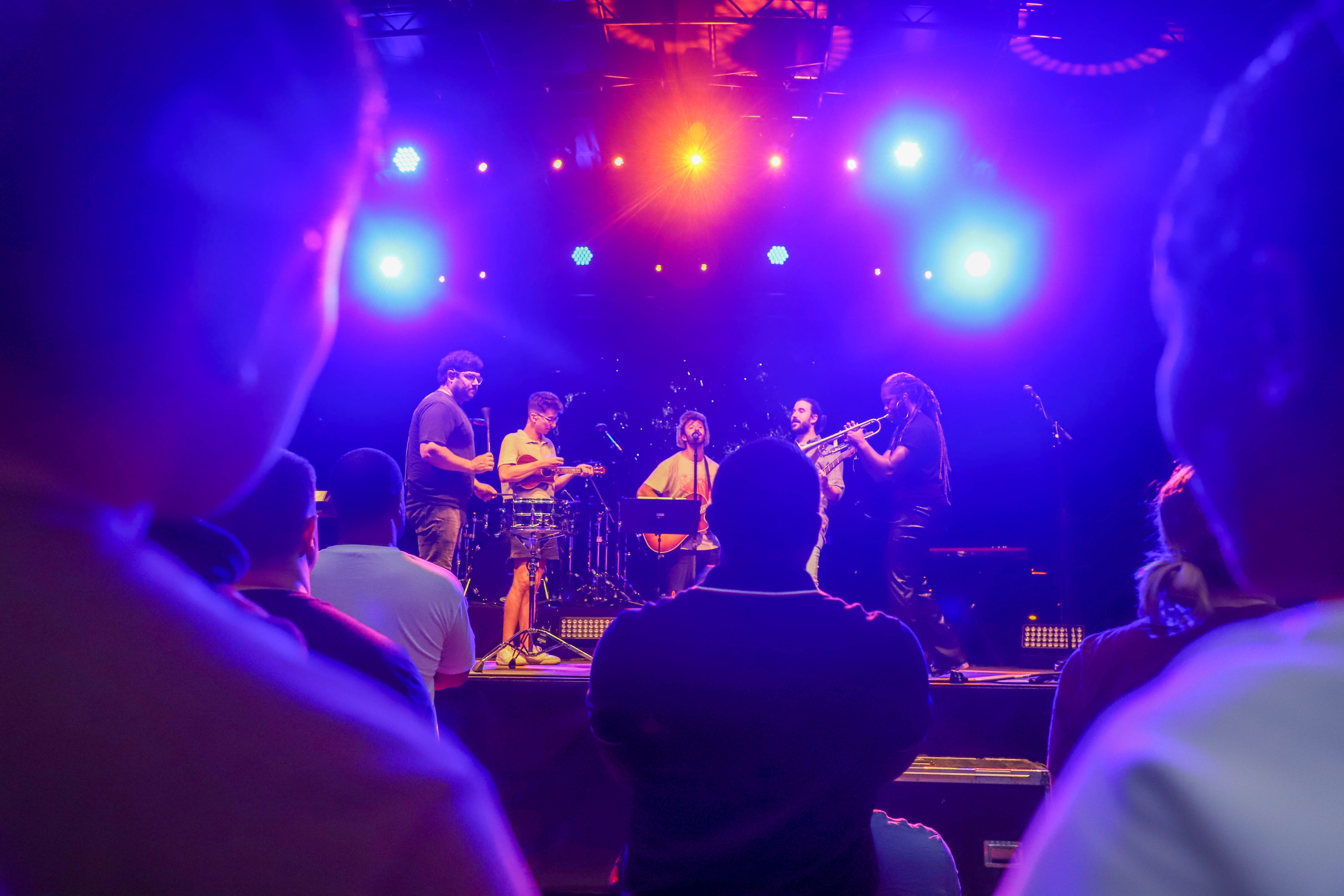
Chris (drum), Ryan (ukulele), Jack (guitar), Adam (bass), and Arnetta (trumpet) performing "World's Smallest Violin"

AJR

- Adam Met – bass guitar, backing vocals, percussion, programming
- Jack Met – lead vocals, guitar, sampler, ukulele, drums, whistling, percussion, keyboards, melodica, programming
- Ryan Met – production, programming, vocals, keyboards, piano, ukulele, sampler

Touring members

- Arnetta Johnson – trumpet, piano (2020–present)
- Chris Berry – drums, guitar (2018–present)
- Ginny Luke – violin, saxophone, piano (2024–2025)
- JJ Kirkpatrick – trumpet (2018–2019)

== Awards and nominations ==
Year	Ceremony	Recipient	Category	Result	Ref.
2024	Berlin Music Video Awards	Maybe Man	Best Animation	Nominated	
2024	Ottawa International Animation Festival	Maybe Man	N/A	Nominated	
2024	Manchester Animation Festival	Maybe Man	Commissioned Film (Note: Categories for non-winning works screened at the festival are not publicly announced, but music videos may only be submitted under the Commissioned Films category.)	Nominated	
2023	iHeartRadio Music Awards	"World's Smallest Violin"	TikTok Bop of the Year (Socially Voted Category)	Nominated	
2023	iHeartRadio Music Awards	Themselves	Best Duo/Group of the Year	Nominated	
2022	iHeartRadio Music Awards	"All My Favorite Songs" w/ Weezer	Alternative Song of the Year	Nominated	
2022	iHeartRadio Music Awards	Themselves	Best Duo/Group of the Year	Nominated	
2022	Billboard Music Awards	OK Orchestra	Top Rock Album	Nominated	
2021	American Music Awards	Themselves	Favorite Pop Duo or Group	Nominated	
2021	American Music Awards	Themselves	Favorite Rock Artist	Nominated	
2021	BMI Awards	"Bang!"	BMI POP Awards	Won	
2021	iHeartRadio Music Awards	"Bang!"	Alternative Rock Song of the Year	Nominated	
2021	iHeartRadio Music Awards	Themselves	Alternative Rock Artist of the Year	Nominated	
2021	Billboard Music Awards	"Bang!"	Top Rock Song	Won	
2021	Billboard Music Awards	Themselves	Top Duo/Group	Nominated	
2021	Billboard Music Awards	Themselves	Top Rock Artist	Nominated	
2019	Teen Choice Awards	"100 Bad Days"	Choice Rock Song	Nominated	
2019	Teen Choice Awards	Themselves	Choice Rock Artist	Nominated	
2019	iHeartRadio Music Awards	Themselves	Best New Rock/Alt. Rock Artist	Nominated	

== Discography ==
Studio albums

- Living Room (2015)
- The Click (2017)
- Neotheater (2019)
- OK Orchestra (2021)
- The Maybe Man (2023)

Extended plays

- AJR (2012)
- 6foot1 (2013)
- Infinity (2014)
- What Everyone's Thinking (2016)
- What No One's Thinking (2025)

== Filmography ==
Ryan (ukulele), Jack (sampler) and Adam (bass guitar) singing "Infinity", "Growing Old on Bleecker Street" and "I'm Ready" live performance on Border Crossings (radio show)

=== Television ===
Year	Title	Role	Notes	Ref.
2014	The X Factor	Musical guest	In Australian Season 6	
2014	Live with Kelly and Michael	Musical guest	In Season 27	
2016	Live with Kelly	Musical guest	Episode 10	
2017	Live with Kelly and Ryan	Musical guest	In Season 29; 30; 32	
2018	Live with Kelly and Ryan	Musical guest	In Season 29; 30; 32	
2020	Live with Kelly and Ryan	Musical guest	In Season 29; 30; 32	
2020	The Ellen DeGeneres Show	Musical guest	Episode 2953	
2020	Macy's Thanksgiving Day Parade	Musical guest	Television special	
2021	iHeartRadio Jingle Ball	Musical guest	Television special	
2021	NBC's New Year's Eve	Musical guest	Television special	
2021	The Late Late Show with James Corden	Musical guest	Episode 862	
2021	The Not-Too-Late Show with Elmo	Musical guest	Season 2 Episode 13	
2021	The Kelly Clarkson Show	Musical guest	Episode 308; 464	
2022	The Kelly Clarkson Show	Musical guest	Episode 308; 464	
2022	iHeartRadio Jingle Ball	Musical guest	Television special	
2022	Dick Clark's New Year's Rockin' Eve	Musical guest	Television special	
2022	The Tonight Show Starring Jimmy Fallon	Musical guest	Episode 1690; 1872	
2023	The Tonight Show Starring Jimmy Fallon	Musical guest	Episode 1690; 1872	
2023	Music Universe K-909	Musical guest	Korean Episode 18	
2023	Live with Kelly and Mark	Musical guest	In Season 36	
2023	The Voice	Musical guest	In Season 24	
2023	iHeartRadio Jingle Ball	Musical guest	Television special	
2024	NHL Stadium Series	Musical guest	Rangers-Islanders intermission	
2024	The Kelly Clarkson Show	Musical guest	Episode 791	
2025	Jimmy Kimmel Live!	Musical guest	Season 23 Episode 139	
2026	Dick Clark's New Year's Rockin' Eve	Musical guest	Television special	
2026	The Tonight Show Starring Jimmy Fallon	Musical guest	Episode 2234	
2026	The Fourth in America: Celebrating 250	Musical guest	Television special	

== Headlining tours ==
- The Infinity Tour (2014)
- What Everyone's Thinking Tour (2017)
- The Click Tour (2018)
- Neotheater World Tour (2019–2020)
- OK Orchestra Tour (2021–2022)
- The Maybe Man Tour (2024)
- Somewhere in the Sky Tour (2025)

Other concerts

- AJR Festival shows (2023)
- AJR Live at Red Rocks

COVID-19 concerts

- A Night in Your Car with AJR (2020)
- One Spectacular Night (2020)
- One More Spectacular Night (2021) (rerun)

In 2020, the band postponed a second leg of the Neotheater World Tour and an upcoming Everything Everywhere Tour, later canceling them due to the COVID-19 pandemic. On July 21, 2020, AJR announced their drive-in show, "A night in your car with AJR", which took place on August 19, 2020, in Philadelphia. Two days later after the first show had sold out entirely, they announced a second show for Philadelphia which took place on August 20. The first show saw the debut of "Bummerland".

On November 19, 2020, AJR announced their first virtual concert, AJR's One Spectacular Night, which took place on December 26, 2020. The livestream was interactive, allowing viewers to clap after songs and change the camera to both simulate a live concert and experiment with live streaming.

=== Opening acts ===
AJR has opened for Andy Grammer, American Authors, Demi Lovato, Fifth Harmony, Fitz and the Tantrums, Hoodie Allen, Imagine Dragons, Ingrid Michaelson, Lindsey Stirling, Melanie Martinez, Sammy Adams, the Wanted, Train, and We the Kings.

== Philanthropy ==
- On March 31, 2017, AJR released the charity single "It's On Us" to support sexual violence survivors across the United States.
- $1 from every The Maybe Man Tour ticket sold will go towards Planet Reimagined, a non-profit organization co-founded by Adam Met that trains the climate leaders of the future, teaching them how to combine thought and advocacy for measurable impact to fight the climate crisis and deliver fair solutions for people and the planet.

== See also ==
- List of indie pop artists
- List of bands formed in New York City
- List of artists who reached number one on the U.S. alternative rock chart
- List of sibling groups
