= 6foot1 =

EP by AJR
- Released: December 20, 2013
- Recorded: 2012–2013
- Genre: Indie pop; electropop
- Length: 18:27
- Label: AJR Productions; WMG
- Producer: Ryan Met

AJR chronology
AJR (2012)	6foot1 (2013)	Infinity (2014)

Singles from 6foot1
- 1. "I'm Ready" Released: August 22, 2013; 2. "Growing Old on Bleecker Street" Released: October 16, 2013

6foot1 is an extended play by American indie pop band AJR, released via their label AJR Productions on December 20, 2013. After signing to Warner Music Group, it was re-released as the I'm Ready EP on March 25, 2014, as the band's major label debut. Three of the five tracks on 6foot1 were included on the band's debut studio album. Living Room (2015).

== Background ==
In October 2012, Hurricane Sandy affected AJR, forcing the band to temporarily stay in a college dorm at Columbia University due to a loss of power at home. They wrote "I'm Ready" during this time, and recorded and released the song in November 2012. Band member Ryan Met then tweeted a link to the song's music video to about 80 celebrities, including Australian singer Sia. Sia told her manager about the song, who contacted Steve Greenberg, former president of Columbia Records and current CEO and founder of S-Curve Records, which led to recognition of the band by music labels.

"I'm Ready" was commercially released as the lead single of 6foot1 on August 22, 2013. On October 16, 2013, "Growing Old on Bleecker Street" was released on YouTube as the second single of 6foot1 alongside "Livin' on Love", "Infinity", and "The World Is a Marble Heart", all of which would later be used on Living Room. The tracklist was revealed on December 13, 2013, along with acoustic performances of the singles. The EP was released on December 20. The band cites fun., The Beach Boys, Sia, Kanye West, and Simon & Garfunkel as inspiration for their songwriting on the EP.

In March 2014, Warner Music Group signed AJR and re-released 6foot1 as the I'm Ready EP, named after its lead single.

== Track listing ==
All tracks are written by Jack and Ryan Met, except where noted.

6foot1 / I'm Ready EP track listing
No.	Title	Writer(s)	Length
1.	"I'm Ready"	Jack Met	3:47
2.	"Woody Allen"		3:44
3.	"Growing Old on Bleecker Street"		3:23
4.	"AfterHours"		3:24
5.	"Buy You a Rose"		4:07
Total length:			18:27

== Personnel ==
Credits adapted from Tidal.

AJR

- Adam Met – bass guitar, co-lead vocals
- Jack Met – lead vocals, instruments
- Ryan Met – lead vocals, production, mixing (all tracks), arranger (1)

Additional personnel

- Chris Gehringer – mastering engineer

== Charts ==
Weekly chart performance for I'm Ready (EP)
Chart (2014)	Peak position
US Heatseekers Albums (Billboard)	32
