= The Dumb Song =

2023 single by AJR

Single by AJR

from the album The Maybe Man
- Released: April 21, 2023
- Recorded: 2023
- Length: 3:45
- Label: Mercury
- Songwriter(s): Jack Met; Adam Met; Ryan Met
- Producer(s): Ryan Met

AJR singles chronology
"The DJ Is Crying for Help" (2022)	"The Dumb Song" (2023)	"God Is Really Real" (2023)

Music video
- "The Dumb Song" on YouTube

"The Dumb Song" is a song by American pop band AJR. It was released on April 21, 2023, via Mercury Records as the third single from the band's fifth studio album The Maybe Man.

== Promotion ==
On January 9, 2023, the first teaser for the song was posted on YouTube, showing the end of the third verse. The song was teased again on March 28 and April 2, 2023, with a third teaser on April 11 revealing the song's title. More teasers were published on YouTube Shorts on April 13, April 16, and April 20, before "The Dumb Song" was released on April 21, 2023.

== Composition and lyrics ==
"The Dumb Song" is composed in 4/4 time signature in the key of F major during the verses and in C major during the choruses and follows a tempo of 171 beats per minute (bpm). In the lyrics, the protagonist of the song is referred to as dumb, but instead of taking it as an insult chooses to embrace the title, from the lyrics “you think you’re hurting me; bet you won’t believe it but you kinda set me free. .

== Music video ==
A music video for "The Dumb Song" directed by Edoardo Ranaboldo and Austin Roa was released on April 21, 2023. The video differs from the band's standard music videos by centering the focus on AJR writing and producing the song over a year-and-a-half period, starting with the writing process in a newly built studio in October 2021. The initial guitar and bass are recorded and more writing is done in February 2022. In March 2022, Jack reunites with college friends Andrew Sobelsohn and Martin Liberman, who later in September 2022 become backing vocalists on the song with Andrew additionally performing guitar. Work on the song is temporarily paused during May, June, and July 2022 to perform a world tour. The drums and trumpet are first recorded in August 2022, and the band starts revising demo mixes in November 2022. The music video ends with the band listening to the song's final mix in their car, approving it. The video has amassed over 3.5 million views as of April 2024.

== Personnel ==
Credits adapted from Tidal.

- Adam Met – instruments, composer
- Jack Met – main vocals, instruments, composer
- Ryan Met – instruments, composer, producer, programming
- Chris Gehringer – mastering engineer
- Chloe Brettholtz – kid voice
- Chris Berry – drums
- Arnetta Johnson – trumpet
- Andrew Sobelsohn – backing vocals, guitar
- Martin Liberman – backing vocals
- Alba Avoricani – backing vocals
- Honore Balan – backing vocals
- Nell Balan – backing vocals
- Cat Capps – backing vocals
- Rob Piccione – backing vocals

== Charts ==
Weekly chart performance for "The Dumb Song"
Chart (2023)	Peak position
New Zealand Hot Singles (RMNZ)	33
US Alternative Airplay (Billboard)	26
US Hot Rock & Alternative Songs (Billboard)	23
