= What No One's Thinking =

EP by AJR
- Released: September 5, 2025
- Length: 17:11
- Label: AJR Productions
- Producer: Ryan Met

AJR chronology
The Maybe Man (2023)	What No One's Thinking (2025)

Singles from What No One's Thinking
- 1. "Betty" Released: July 9, 2025; 2. "The Big Goodbye" Released: September 6, 2025

What No One's Thinking is the fourth extended play by American pop band AJR. It was released on September 5, 2025, via the band's label AJR Productions. Prior to its release, the EP was supported by the lead single "Betty".

== Background ==
Following their fifth studio album, The Maybe Man (2023), AJR attempted to write more songs discussing their feelings, but encountered a writer's block. This led the band to focus more on the emotions they felt rather than the thoughts they had after realizing they held an opposite state of mind from their earlier work. Following the completion of four songs, AJR entitled the project What No One's Thinking as a successor to their third extended play, What Everyone's Thinking (2016).

== Promotion ==
AJR released a snippet of the track "I'm Sorry You Went Crazy" in February 2025. AJR announced the Somewhere in the Sky Tour in March 2025, scheduled to begin in July and take place exclusively in amphitheaters. In June, the band announced What No One's Thinking as their next extended play. On June 26, behind-the-scenes footage of a music video for "Betty" was shown, announcing it as a single to release on July 9. On June 29, the song made its live debut during a concert in China, followed by a performance on Jimmy Kimmel Live! on July 8. The music video for "Betty" was published alongside the single, utilizing pixilation as lead singer Jack Met performs the song alone in his attic. On the same day, the EP was announced to be released on August 29 and its tracklist was revealed, including "Betty" as the third of five songs. It would be independently released via the band's label AJR Productions. On August 25, AJR announced that What No One's Thinking would be delayed by a week to September 5, stating that the EP "wasn't finished yet".

== Track listing ==
All tracks are written by Jack and Ryan Met, except where noted.

What No One's Thinking track listing
No.	Title	Writer(s)	Length
1.	"The Plane That Never Lands"		2:54
2.	"A Dog Song"		3:42
3.	"Betty"		2:43
4.	"I'm Sorry You Went Crazy"		2:50
5.	"The Big Goodbye"	J. Met; R. Met; Buddy Black; Leroy Van Dyke	5:02
Total length:			17:11

== Personnel ==
Credits adapted from Tidal.

- Jack Met – lead vocals, instruments
- Ryan Met – lead vocals, production, programming
- Joe Zook – mixing engineer
