= It's On Us (song) =

2017 charity single by AJR

Single by AJR
- Released: March 31, 2017
- Length: 3:27
- Label: AJR Productions
- Songwriters: Adam Met; Jack Met; Ryan Met; Rebecca Kaplan
- Producer: Ryan Met

AJR singles chronology
"Weak" (2016)	"It's On Us" (2017)	"Celebrate" (2017)

Audio
- "It's On Us" on YouTube

"It's On Us" is a charity single by American indie pop band AJR, released on March 31, 2017, through their own label AJR Productions. All proceeds from sales of the single were donated to Barack Obama's campaign of the same name, raising awareness of and fighting against sexual assault on college campuses in the United States.

== Background ==
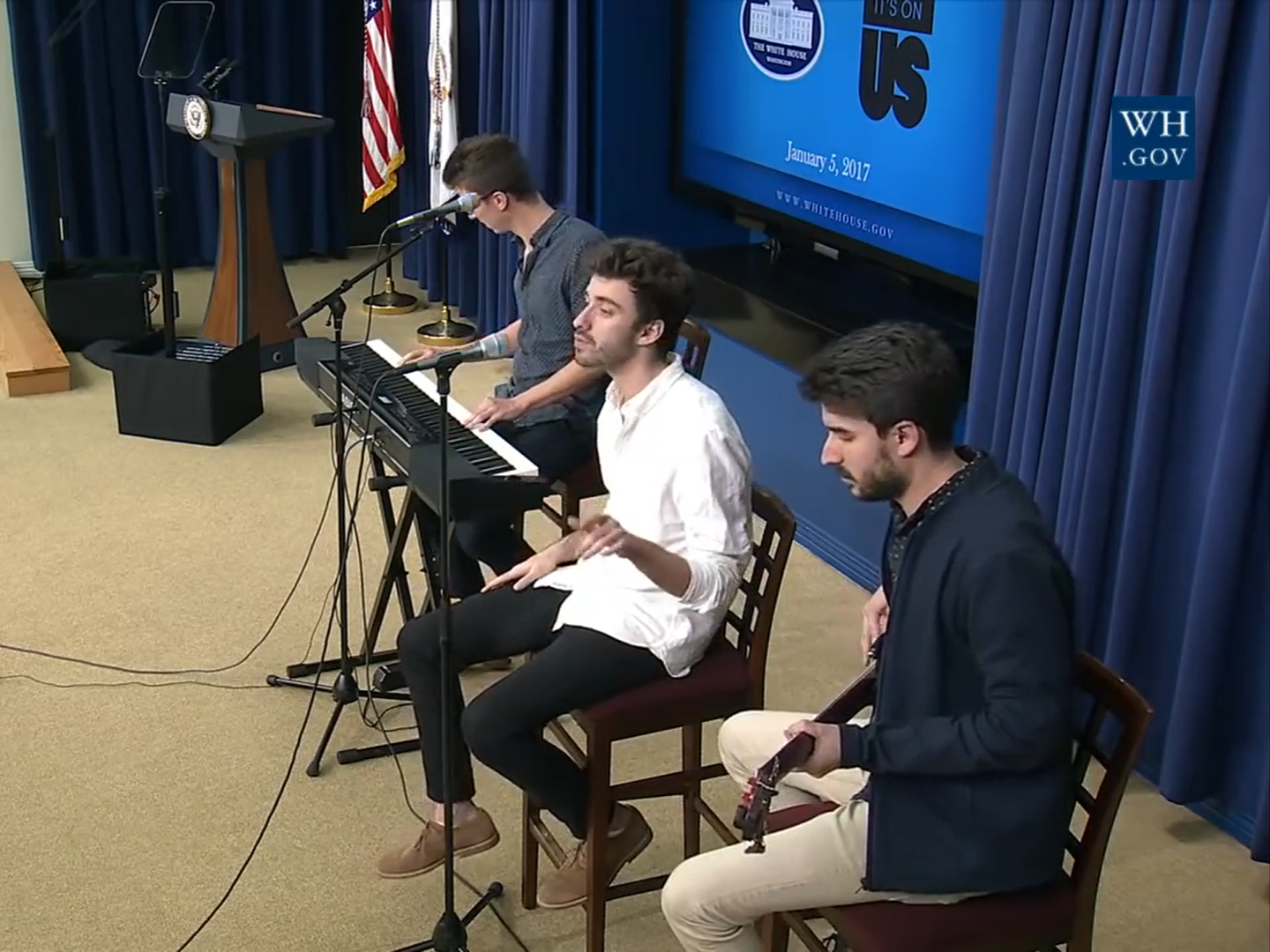
AJR performing for the It's On Us summit in 2017

The It's On Us campaign was launched by Barack Obama and the White House Council on Women and Girls on September 19, 2014, aiming to raise awareness about sexual assault on college campuses and encourage the public to recognize and intervene when possible. Following the release of AJR's single "Weak", Obama listened to the song via Spotify, which led to his administration asking the band to help support the campaign. The band accepted, describing the movement's goals as "an important topic to us because most of our fans are in that college-age demographic, and it presents a real problem on college campuses" and expressed happiness with using AJR's popularity as a platform for it.

AJR approached Rebecca Kaplan, the director of "It's On Us", with the idea of writing a song, who agreed and helped the band meet with sexual assault survivors and incorporate their stories into the song, naming it after the campaign. AJR performed "It's On Us" alongside their song "Turning Out" from the band's second studio album, The Click, and a cover of "Can't Help Falling in Love" by Elvis Presley at the White House for the final It's On Us summit on January 5, 2017. A studio recording of "It's On Us" was released onto streaming services on March 31, 2017, with the band donating all of the song's proceeds to the initiative.

== Composition ==
"It's On Us" is composed in 4/4 time signature in the key of A major and follows a tempo of 88 beats per minute (bpm). The song appears on streaming services with the extended title "It's On Us (Benefiting the 'It's On Us' Campaign)". Although the band advertised the song as having other musicians featured on it, none are present or credited.
