= Infinity (AJR EP) =

2014 EP by AJR

EP by AJR
- Released: September 23, 2014
- Genres: Indie pop; electropop
- Length: 18:12
- Labels: AJR Productions; WMG
- Producer: Ryan Met

AJR chronology
6foot1 (2013)	Infinity (2014)	Living Room (2015)

Singles from Infinity
- 1. "Infinity" Released: September 11, 2014

Infinity is the second extended play by American indie pop band AJR, published through Warner Music Group and the band's label AJR Productions. It was released on September 23, 2014, to accommodate the delay of the band's debut studio album, Living Room (2015). The EP produced the sole single "Infinity", which received praise from critics and commercial success. The song would later be included on their debut album alongside "Pitchfork Kids".

== Background and promotion ==
Following the commercial success of AJR's 2013 extended play 6foot1, the band signed with Warner Music Group to release an album. Living Room was scheduled for release on September 30, 2014, but was pushed back due to unfinished production on August 15 to an expected release of February 2015. Alongside this, Infinity was announced as an EP to follow 6foot1 and precede the album. "Infinity" was released as the EP's sole single on September 11, 2014. Infinity released on September 23, 2014, with the band additionally announcing the Infinity Tour, a 10-date tour across the eastern United States.

== Content ==
=== "Infinity" ===
"Infinity" is an upbeat pop song, with string and acoustic-focused instrumentation and vocals led by all three brothers. The song was described by Idolator as "a stripped-back, folk-tinged pop song with a powerful sing-a-long chorus". "Infinity" was initially released on YouTube in 2013 before its proper release with updated production. The song was picked as a single to contrast their previous single "I'm Ready", with band member Adam Met stating "we didn't want something that sounded exactly the same, and we didn't want to, kind of, pigeonhole ourselves into just doing that very specific kind of music" in an interview with Niagra Frontier Publications.

Alongside its release on September 11, 2014, AJR published a lyric video for the song, featuring stills of the band floating in the air with lyrics appearing on top of the images. A music video for "Infinity" was released on January 14, 2015. The video cuts between the band performing the song in a solid white room and illustrations of positive and negative relationship aspects. The animation for the video was done by filming the scenes in-person and tracing over certain aspects of it. "Infinity" was additionally performed on Today on May 19, 2015. The song was included as the second track of the band's debut album Living Room (2015).

=== Other songs ===
"Alice by the Hudson" is a downtempo waltz song, with vocals provided by each member in barbershop style. The song's post-choruses electronically manipulate and cut up the vocals, which the band refers to with the term "spokestep". "Pitchfork Kids" is an uptempo electropop song, with heavy percussion and production. This is accompanied by hip-hop influence in instrument choice and further use of "spokestep". "Pitchfork Kids" was included as the sixth track of Living Room (2015), while also being a fan-favorite of the EP and album. "3AM" is a soft love song, additionally featuring whistling, ukulele, and light piano. "I'm Ready - Remix by AJR" is a dance remix of the band's debut single, "I'm Ready", changing the tempo of various sections and adding percussion.

== Infinity Tour ==
Infinity Tour
- Tour by AJR
- Location: United States
- Associated album: Infinity
- Start date: October 24, 2014
- End date: November 5, 2014
- No. of shows: 10

AJR concert chronology
- Infinity Tour (2014); What Everyone's Thinking Tour (2017)

The Infinity Tour was the first concert tour by American indie pop band AJR, supporting their second extended play, Infinity (2014). It ran from October 24 to November 5, 2014, and covered 10 shows across the eastern United States. The set list included each song from the EP alongside other singles and tracks from their prior EPs. The band announced the tour alongside the release of Infinity, released on September 23, 2014.

=== Set list ===
1. "Woody Allen"
2. "Married on a Hill"
3. "After Hours" (Note: Stylized with no spaces)
4. "Growing Old On Bleecker Street"
5. "Ignition (Remix)" (R. Kelly cover)
6. "Alice By The Hudson"
7. "The World Is A Marble Heart"
8. "The Green And The Town"
9. "Livin' On Love"
10. "3 AM"
11. "Infinity"
12. "Pitchfork Kids"
13. "Ho Hey" (The Lumineers unplugged cover; ft. Minor Soul)
14. "I'm Ready"

=== Tour dates ===
List of concerts
Date (2014)	City	Country	Venue	Opening act	Attendance	Revenue
October 24	Silver Spring	United States	The Fillmore Silver Spring	Minor Soul	—N/a	—N/a
October 25	Freehold Township	United States	iPlay America	Minor Soul	129 / 129	$3,525
October 26	New York City	United States	Gramercy Theatre	Minor Soul	—N/a	—N/a
October 28	Philadelphia	United States	The Barbary	Minor Soul	—N/a	—N/a
October 29	Rochester	United States	Montage Music Hall	Minor Soul	—N/a	—N/a
October 30	Buffalo	United States	The Waiting Room	Minor Soul	—N/a	—N/a
November 1	Hamden	United States	The Space Ballroom	Minor Soul	—N/a	—N/a
November 2	Syracuse	United States	The Lost Horizon	Minor Soul	—N/a	—N/a
November 4	Boston	United States	The Red Room at Cafe 939	Minor Soul	106 / 180	$1,590
November 5	Albany	United States	The Hollow	Minor Soul	—N/a	—N/a

== Track listing ==
All tracks are written by Jack and Ryan Met, except where noted.

Infinity (EP) track listing
No.	Title	Writer(s)	Length
1.	"Infinity"		3:59
2.	"Alice by the Hudson"		3:37
3.	"Pitchfork Kids"		3:32
4.	"3AM"		3:45
5.	"I'm Ready - Remix by AJR"	Jack Met	3:19
Total length:			18:12

== Personnel ==
Credits adapted from Tidal.

- Adam Met – bass guitar, co-lead vocals
- Jack Met – lead vocals, instruments
- Ryan Met – lead vocals, production, mixing (all tracks), arranger (5)
- Chris Gehringer – mastering engineer (1–3)

== Charts ==
Weekly chart performance for Infinity (EP)
Chart (2014)	Peak position
US Heatseekers Albums (Billboard)	36
