= The DJ Is Crying for Help =

2022 single by AJR

Single by AJR

from the album The Maybe Man
- Released: November 18, 2022
- Recorded: 2022
- Genre: Pop; electropop
- Length: 3:39
- Label: Mercury
- Songwriter(s): Jack Met; Adam Met; Ryan Met
- Producer(s): Ryan Met

AJR singles chronology
"I Won't" (2022)	"The DJ Is Crying for Help" (2022)	"The Dumb Song" (2023)

Music video
- "The DJ is Crying for Help" on YouTube

"The DJ Is Crying for Help" is a song by American pop band AJR. It was released on November 18, 2022, via Mercury Records as the second single from the band's fifth studio album The Maybe Man.

== Promotion ==
AJR began teasing the song in a YouTube short on August 21, 2022, showing the instrumental's production. Additional teasers of the song were posted to YouTube on August 30 and October 4 before revealing the song's release date and title on November 15, 2022. The single released November 18, 2022, through Mercury Records.

== Composition ==
"The DJ Is Crying for Help" is composed in 4/4 time signature in the key of B minor and follows a tempo of 145 beats per minute (bpm). A soft piano forms the opening melody of the song before transitioning into a heavy composure of violins, synths, and other instruments during the chorus.

== Music video ==
The official music video for the song was directed by Austin Roa and released on November 18, 2022. The video was filmed in Paris during a cloudy day off from AJR's Europe tour and features the band running through the city, most notably in front of the Eiffel Tower. The video has amassed over 5.67 million views as of April 2024.

== Personnel ==
Credits adapted from Tidal.

- Adam Met – backing vocals, instruments, composer
- Jack Met – main vocals, instruments, composer
- Ryan Met – backing vocals, instruments, composer, producer, programming
- Chris Gehringer – mastering engineer
- Joe Zook – mixing engineer
- Alba Avoricani – backing vocals
- Andy Sobelson – backing vocals
- Ariel Gandler – backing vocals
- Cat Capps – backing vocals
- Chris Berry – backing vocals
- Dane Hagen – backing vocals
- Ezra Donellan – backing vocals
- Marten Lieberman – backing vocals
- Rob Piccione – backing vocals

== Charts ==
Weekly chart performance for "The DJ Is Crying for Help"
Chart (2022)	Peak position
New Zealand Hot Singles (RMNZ)	13
US Alternative Digital Song Sales (Billboard)	4
US Hot Rock & Alternative Songs (Billboard)	24
