= I Won't (song) =

2022 single by AJR

Single by AJR

from the album The Maybe Man
- Released: July 29, 2022
- Recorded: 2022
- Genre: Pop; electropop
- Length: 2:48
- Label: Mercury
- Songwriter(s): Jack Met; Adam Met; Ryan Met
- Producer(s): Ryan Met

AJR singles chronology
"The Good Part" (2021)	"I Won't" (2022)	"The DJ Is Crying for Help" (2022)

Music video
- "I Won't" on YouTube

"I Won't" is a song by American pop band AJR. It was released on July 29, 2022 via Mercury Records as the lead single from the band's fifth studio album The Maybe Man.

== Background ==
On April 22, 2022, AJR posted a short on YouTube rhetorically asking if they should play the song on tour. The song was subsequently played at shows during the 2022 leg of the band's OK Orchestra tour, with all 28 shows of the leg taking place before the single's release date. Additional teasers of the song were posted to YouTube on April 24, May 4, May 21, and June 2, before the title of the song was revealed on July 18, 2022.

Before writing the song, AJR began writing a different song intended to be the lead single. The band got frustrated while stuck on writing, but "took that frustration and put it into a song", creating "I Won't". Lead singer Jack Met described "I Won't" as "our own version of a punk 'F-you' song", with member Ryan Met stating "the message is, 'Be yourself.' However, we know it's much easier said than done. We wanted to make a song that inspired others, but also ourselves to be who we are". 25 minutes after the single released on July 29, AJR performed the song on The Tonight Show Starring Jimmy Fallon. The band also signed with Mercury Records on May 18, 2022, making "I Won't" the first song AJR has released through the label.

== Composition ==
"I Won't" is composed in 4/4 time signature in the key of C major and follows a tempo of 162 beats per minute (bpm).

The song's instruments consist of an "old-fashioned" and "mysterious" piano, a violin and organ with digital pitch-bending, a bassline with "percussive elements", and a kick and snare interplay. The intro of the song additionally features a sample of Ryan Met laughing.

== Music video ==
On July 29, 2022, an official video directed by Patrick Tracy was released. The band performs the song with rapidly changing outfits, instruments, and scenery in the video. The video was initially intended to be released at 10 AM EST, but was delayed to later in the day, with the band stating "we were up all night finishing the edit and it's taking forever to export and upload". The video has amassed nearly 10 million views as of February 2025.

== Personnel ==
Credits adapted from Tidal.

- Adam Met – instruments, composer
- Jack Met – lead vocals, instruments, composer
- Ryan Met – instruments, composer, producer, programming
- Dale Becker – mastering engineer
- Katie Harvey – assistant mastering engineer
- Brandon Hernandez – assistant mastering engineer
- Noah McCorkle – assistant mastering engineer
- Benjamin Hostetler – backing vocals
- Zachary Murphy – backing vocals
- Rob Piccione – backing vocals, engineer
- Joe Zook – mixing engineer

== Charts ==
=== Weekly charts ===
Weekly chart performance for "I Won't"
Chart (2022)	Peak position
New Zealand Hot Singles (RMNZ)	29
US Hot Rock & Alternative Songs (Billboard)	19
US Rock Airplay (Billboard)	22

=== Year-end charts ===
Year-end chart performance for "I Won't"
Chart (2022)	Position
US Alternative Airplay (Billboard)	41
