= The Good Part =

2021 single by AJR

Single by AJR

from the album The Click
- Released: November 24, 2021
- Recorded: 2016–2017
- Genre: Pop
- Length: 3:47 (album version); 3:15 (music video); 2:47 (radio version)
- Label: AJR Productions
- Songwriters: Jack Met; Adam Met; Ryan Met
- Producer: Ryan Met

AJR singles chronology
"Record Player" (2021)	"The Good Part" (2021)	"I Won't" (2022)

Music video
- "The Good Part" on YouTube

"The Good Part" is a song by American indie pop band AJR. It is the second track on the band's second studio album The Click, which was released on June 9, 2017 via the band's label AJR Productions. The song saw a resurgence in popularity in 2021, which led to the band retroactively releasing it as the album's seventh single on November 24, 2021, roughly four years after the album's release.

== Background ==
In 2016, Ingrid Michaelson toured with AJR as an opening act. In an interview on Zach Sang Show, lead singer Jack Met mentions that they began writing "The Good Part" while in the tour bus, making it the only song on The Click that was not written in the band's living room. A sample of Johann Sebastian Bach's Suite No. 3 in D major, BWV 1068 appears in the song to make it "sound like a graduation ceremony that you're kind of sad to be at". Additionally, Jack interpolated the main chorus melody from Peter, Paul and Mary's "The Cruel War".

Upon release, "The Good Part" did not receive any critical reception and was ultimately overshadowed by the two songs following it on the tracklist, "Weak" and "Sober Up". The song skyrocketed in popularity in late 2021 however, appearing in 2.7 million Instagram Reels and becoming the number one song on Instagram. "The Good Part" received additional attention on TikTok and other streaming services, leading to the band creating a music video for the song, adding it to their tour's setlist, and releasing it to the radio for airplay.

== Music video ==
The official video directed by Edoardo Ranaboldo was released on November 24, 2021. The video features the band and several violinists performing the song in a small theater with several home movies projected onto the walls and the band's instruments. The video has grossed over 10 million views as of April 2024.

== Personnel ==
Credits adapted from the album's liner notes.

- Adam Met – vocals, instruments, composer
- Jack Met – main vocals, instruments, composer
- Ryan Met – vocals, instruments, composer, producer, mixing engineer
- Chris Gehringer – mastering engineer

== Charts ==
Weekly chart performance for "The Good Part"
Chart (2022)	Peak position
Germany Download (Official German Charts)	49

== Certifications ==
Certifications for "The Good Part"
Region	Certification	Certified units/sales
United States (RIAA)	Gold	500,000^{‡}
^{‡} Sales+streaming figures based on certification alone.
