= List of top 10 singles for 2014 in Australia =

This is a list of singles that peaked in the top ten of the ARIA Charts in 2014.

== Top-ten singles ==
Key

Symbol	Meaning
◁	Indicates single's top 10 entry was also its ARIA top 50 debut
(#)	2014 Year-end top 10 single position and rank

List of ARIA top ten singles that peaked in 2014
Top ten entry date	Single	Artist(s)	Peak	Peak date	Weeks in top ten	References
Singles from 2013
29 July	"Riptide"	Vance Joy	6	3 February	5	
16 December	"Happy" (#1) ◁	Pharrell Williams	1	6 January	20	
23 December	"Free"	Rudimental featuring Emeli Sandé	5	13 January	11	
Singles from 2014
13 January	"Swing"	Joel Fletcher and Savage	2	27 January	9	
20 January	"Strong"	London Grammar	4	3 February	4	
27 January	"Say Something"	A Great Big World and Christina Aguilera	1	10 February	8	
27 January	"Red Lights"	Tiësto	8	27 January	1	
10 February	"Jump"	Rihanna	5	17 February	2	
10 February	"Addicted to You"	Avicii	5	24 February	3	
17 February	"Take Me Home"	Cash Cash featuring Bebe Rexha	7	24 February	4	
24 February	"Undressed"	Kim Cesarion	5	3 March	5	
24 February	"Brave"	Sara Bareilles	3	10 March	7	
24 February	"Rather Be"	Clean Bandit featuring Jess Glynne	2	3 March	10	
3 March	"Best Day of My Life"	American Authors	10	3 March	1	
3 March	"She Looks So Perfect" ◁	5 Seconds of Summer	1	31 March	8	
10 March	"Shot Me Down"	David Guetta featuring Skylar Grey	3	17 March	6	
17 March	"Magic"	Coldplay	5	24 March	3	
17 March	"When You Were Mine" ◁	Taylor Henderson	5	17 March	1	
24 March	"The Man"	Aloe Blacc	10	24 March	1	
24 March	"The Power of Love"	Gabrielle Aplin	5	7 April	4	
24 March	"#Selfie"	The Chainsmokers	3	7 April	4	
31 March	"Wild Wild Love"	Pitbull featuring G.R.L.	10	31 March	1	
31 March	"Summer"	Calvin Harris	4	21 April	6	
31 March	"High"	Peking Duk featuring Nicole Millar	5	14 April	6	
7 April	"Chandelier" (#6)	Sia	2	21 April	15	
14 April	"Geronimo" (#4)	Sheppard	1	14 April	13	
21 April	"Tsunami (Jump)"	DVBBS and Borgeous featuring Tinie Tempah	10	21 April	1	
21 April	"Replay"	Zendaya	8	21 April	1	
21 April	"Never Be the Same"	Jessica Mauboy	6	21 April	2	
28 April	"Not a Bad Thing"	Justin Timberlake	10	28 April	1	
28 April	"I Will Never Let You Down"	Rita Ora	5	28 April	2	
28 April	"Wiggle" ◁	Jason Derulo featuring Snoop Dogg	3	28 April	4	
5 May	"Fancy"	Iggy Azalea featuring Charli XCX	5	9 June	7	
5 May	"Bad"	David Guetta and Showtek featuring Vassy	5	5 May	3	
5 May	"Problem" ◁	Ariana Grande featuring Iggy Azalea	2	12 May	7	
5 May	"Sing" ◁	Ed Sheeran	1	5 May	3	
12 May	"Faded"	Zhu	3	26 May	6	
12 May	"Stay with Me" (#8)	Sam Smith	5	16 June	11	
12 May	"Que Sera" ◁ (#5)	Justice Crew	1	12 May	11	
19 May	"Stolen Dance"	Milky Chance	2	26 May	9	
26 May	"Waves"	Mr Probz	3	2 June	7	
2 June	"Am I Wrong"	Nico & Vinz	2	9 June	8	
23 June	"Stay High"	Tove Lo	3	30 June	5	
23 June	"Don't Stop"	5 Seconds of Summer	3	23 June	1	
30 June	"Don't" ◁	Ed Sheeran	4	14 July	4	
30 June	"Amnesia" ◁	5 Seconds of Summer	7	30 June	1	
30 June	"We Are Done"	The Madden Brothers	1	14 July	7	
30 June	"A Sky Full of Stars"	Coldplay	2	30 June	2	
14 July	"Boom Clap"	Charli XCX	9	14 July	2	
14 July	"Break Free" ◁	Ariana Grande featuring Zedd	3	14 July	4	
21 July	"Only Love Can Hurt Like This" ◁	Paloma Faith	1	28 July	9	
21 July	"Ghost"	Ella Henderson	3	21 July	7	
21 July	"Lovers on the Sun" ◁	David Guetta featuring Sam Martin	2	21 July	2	
28 July	"It's My Birthday"	Will.i.am featuring Cody Wise	4	4 August	3	
28 July	"Ugly Heart" (#10)	G.R.L	2	4 August	11	
28 July	"Please Don't Say You Love Me" ◁	Gabrielle Aplin	3	28 July	3	
4 August	"Budapest"	George Ezra	5	11 August	5	
4 August	"All About That Bass" (#2)	Meghan Trainor	1	11 August	13	
11 August	"Bang Bang"	Jessie J, Ariana Grande and Nicki Minaj	4	11 August	5	
18 August	"Freaks" (#9) ◁	Timmy Trumpet and Savage	3	22 September	15	
18 August	"Prayer in C"	Lilly Wood and the Prick and Robin Schulz	7	1 September	5	
18 August	"I'm Ready"	AJR	5	18 August	6	
18 August	"Jubel"	Klingande	3	25 August	7	
25 August	"Happy Little Pill"	Troye Sivan	10	25 August	1	
25 August	"Shake It Off" (#3) ◁	Taylor Swift	1	1 September	20	
1 September	"Anaconda"	Nicki Minaj	8	1 September	2	
8 September	"New Thang"	Redfoo	3	15 September	7	
22 September	"Blame"	Calvin Harris featuring John Newman	9	29 September	3	
22 September	"Live Louder"	Nathaniel	4	29 September	5	
29 September	"You Ruin Me" ◁	The Veronicas	1	29 September	7	
6 October	"Cool Kids"	Echosmith	6	20 October	7	
6 October	"Thinking Out Loud" (#7)	Ed Sheeran	1	20 October	17	
20 October	"The Days"	Avicii	10	20 October	1	
20 October	"Superheroes"	The Script	7	27 October	2	
27 October	"Dangerous" ◁	David Guetta featuring Sam Martin	7	10 November	5	
27 October	"Can I Get a Moment?" ◁	Jessica Mauboy	5	27 October	2	
27 October	"Stand by You" ◁	Marlisa	2	27 October	4	
3 November	"Lips Are Movin" ◁	Meghan Trainor	3	10 November	11	
3 November	"Coming Back" ◁	Dean Ray	5	3 November	1	
10 November	"Cosby Sweater"	Hilltop Hoods	4	1 December	11	
10 November	"Outside"	Calvin Harris featuring Ellie Goulding	7	8 December	6	
17 November	"Blank Space"	Taylor Swift	1	24 November	11	
24 November	"Steal My Girl"	One Direction	9	24 November	3	
24 November	"Ah Yeah So What" ◁	Will Sparks featuring Wiley and Elen Levon	4	24 November	2	
24 November	"Do They Know It's Christmas? (2014)" ◁	Ed Sheeran, Clean Bandit, Sam Smith, One Direction, Coldplay, Ellie Goulding and more (Note: Other artists include Bastille, Bono, Alfie Deyes, Paloma Faith, Guy Garvey, Angélique Kidjo, Sinéad O'Connor, Rita Ora, Olly Murs, Emeli Sandé, Seal, Joe Sugg, Zoe Sugg, Karl Hyde and Jessie Ware.)	3	24 November	1	
1 December	"If You Love Someone" ◁	The Veronicas	5	1 December	1	
1 December	"Uptown Funk"	Mark Ronson featuring Bruno Mars	1	15 December	21	
8 December	"I'm an Albatraoz" ◁	AronChupa	2	22 December	8	
8 December	"The Hanging Tree"	James Newton Howard featuring Jennifer Lawrence	5	8 December	1	
15 December	"Bed of Lies"	Nicki Minaj featuring Skylar Grey	7	22 December	3	
15 December	"Take Me Over"	Peking Duk featuring SAFIA	6	15 December	5	

=== 2013 peaks ===
List of ARIA top ten singles in 2014 that peaked in 2013
Top ten entry date	Single	Artist(s)	Peak	Peak date	Weeks in top ten	References
22 July	"Royals"	Lorde	2	5 August	11	
19 August	"Roar" ◁	Katy Perry	1	26 August	21	
21 October	"Timber" ◁	Pitbull featuring Kesha	4	28 October	15	
21 October	"Hey Brother"	Avicii	2	21 October	12	
4 November	"Like a Drum" ◁	Guy Sebastian	4	4 November	10	
11 November	"The Monster"	Eminem featuring Rihanna	1	18 November	11	
18 November	"I See Fire" ◁	Ed Sheeran	10	18 November	3	
2 December	"Rude"	Magic!	2	16 December	12	
2 December	"All of Me"	John Legend	1	9 December	15	
16 December	"Trumpets"	Jason Derulo	1	30 December	10	

=== 2015 peaks ===
List of ARIA top ten singles in 2014 that peaked in 2015
Top ten entry date	Single	Artist(s)	Peak	Peak date	Weeks in top ten	References
22 December	"Take Me to Church"	Hozier	2	5 January	16	

== Entries by artist ==
The following table shows artists who achieved two or more top 10 entries in 2014, including songs that reached their peak in 2013 and 2015. The figures include both main artists and featured artists. The total number of weeks an artist spent in the top ten in 2014 is also shown.

Entries	Artist	Weeks	Songs
5	Ed Sheeran	22	"Do They Know It's Christmas? (2014)", "Don't", "I See Fire", "Sing", "Thinking Out Loud"
4	David Guetta	16	"Bad", "Dangerous", "Lovers on the Sun", "Shot Me Down"
3	5 Seconds of Summer	10	"Amnesia", "Don't Stop", "She Looks So Perfect"
3	Ariana Grande	16	"Bang Bang", "Break Free", "Problem"
3	Avicii	5	"Addicted to You", "Hey Brother", "The Days"
3	Calvin Harris	15	"Blame", "Outside", "Summer"
3	Coldplay	6	"A Sky Full of Stars", "Do They Know It's Christmas? (2014)", "Magic"
3	Nicki Minaj	10	"Anaconda", "Bang Bang", "Bed of Lies"
2	Charli XCX	9	"Boom Clap", "Fancy"
2	Clean Bandit	11	"Do They Know It's Christmas? (2014)", "Rather Be"
2	Ellie Goulding	6	"Do They Know It's Christmas? (2014)", "Outside"
2	Emeli Sandé	10	"Do They Know It's Christmas? (2014)", "Free"
2	Gabrielle Aplin	7	"Please Don't Say You Love Me", "The Power of Love"
2	G.R.L.	12	"Ugly Heart", "Wild Wild Love"
2	Iggy Azalea	8	"Fancy", "Problem"
2	Jason Derulo	11	"Trumpets", "Wiggle"
2	Jessica Mauboy	4	"Can I Get a Moment?", "Never Be the Same"
2	Meghan Trainor	22	"All About That Bass", "Lips Are Movin"
2	One Direction	3	"Do They Know It's Christmas? (2014)", "Steal My Girl"
2	Paloma Faith	10	"Do They Know It's Christmas? (2014)", "Only Love Can Hurt Like This"
2	Peking Duk	9	"High", "Take Me Over"
2	Pitbull	5	"Timber", "Wild Wild Love"
2	Rihanna	5	"Jump", "The Monster"
2	Rita Ora	3	"Do They Know It's Christmas? (2014)", "I Will Never Let You Down"
2	Sam Martin	7	"Dangerous", "Lovers on the Sun"
2	Sam Smith	12	"Do They Know It's Christmas? (2014)", "Stay With Me"
2	Savage	23	"Freaks", "Swing"
2	Skylar Grey	9	"Bed of Lies", "Shot Me Down"
2	Taylor Swift	19	"Blank Space", "Shake It Off"
2	The Veronicas	8	"If You Love Someone", "You Ruin Me"

== See also ==
- 2014 in music
- ARIA Charts
- List of number-one singles of 2014 (Australia)
- List of top 25 singles for 2014 in Australia
