= Lovers on the Sun =

Single by David Guetta featuring Sam Martin

from the album Listen
- Released: June 30, 2014
- Genre: Folktronica; Progressive house
- Length: 3:23 (radio edit); 5:53 (extended)
- Label: What a Music; Parlophone
- Songwriters: David Guetta; Tim Bergling; Giorgio Tuinfort; Frédéric Riesterer; Michael Einziger; Sam Martin; Jason Evigan
- Producers: David Guetta; Avicii; Frédéric Riesterer; Giorgio Tuinfort; Daddy's Groove (additional)

David Guetta singles chronology
"Blast Off" (2014)	"Lovers on the Sun" (2014)	"Dangerous" (2014)

Sam Martin singles chronology
"All these Roads" (2013)	"Lovers on the Sun" (2014)	"Dangerous" (2014)

Music video
- "Lovers on the Sun" on YouTube

"Lovers on the Sun" is a song by French music producer David Guetta from his sixth studio album, Listen. It features vocals by American singer and songwriter Sam Martin. It was released as a digital download and the lead single from the album on 30 June 2014. It was produced by Guetta, Avicii, Riesterer, and Tuinfort, with additional production from Italian house production team Daddy's Groove. The track crowned the singles chart in Austria, Finland, Germany and the United Kingdom, and reached the top 40 in most of the countries where it charted.

Mallory Knox covered the song on BBC Radio 1's Live Lounge.

== Background ==
The song is inspired by Spaghetti Western film scores.

== Composition ==
"Lovers on the Sun" is a country, folk and EDM song. Mike Einziger of the band Incubus, who also played on Avicii's "Wake Me Up", also plays guitar on this track. The song is written in the key of B minor, at a tempo of 125 beats per minute, with Martin's vocals ranging from A_{2} to B_{4}. The chord progression of the chorus (Bm/D/F#m/E) bears similarity to Daft Punk's 2013 single "Get Lucky".

== Music video ==
A lyric video was produced for the song with a Wild West theme. An accompanying music video was released on 12 August 2014 again with a Wild West theme. It was directed by Marc Klasfeld, and stars Ray Liotta who portrays a villain and Jamie Gray Hyder, portraying a hero "the Sexy" rescuing Andrew Keegan "the Good". Idolator said the video was "refreshing" and called it "a special effects-filled extravaganza".

== Critical reception ==
4Music celebrated the song's "double DJ power" (Guetta and Avicii, who co-wrote and co-produced the track) and suggested that it "must mean this'll be a big hit".

== Track listing ==
Digital download – radio edit
No.	Title	Length
1.	"Lovers on the Sun" (featuring Sam Martin)	3:23

Digital download – extended
No.	Title	Length
1.	"Lovers on the Sun" (featuring Sam Martin)	5:53

Digital download – remixes
No.	Title	Length
1.	"Lovers on the Sun" (featuring Sam Martin; Stadiumx remix)	6:00
2.	"Lovers on the Sun" (featuring Sam Martin; Showtek remix)	4:53
3.	"Lovers on the Sun" (featuring Sam Martin; Blasterjaxx remix)	5:43
4.	"Lovers on the Sun" (featuring Sam Martin; extended)	5:55

Digital download – EP
No.	Title	Length
1.	"Lovers on the Sun" (featuring Sam Martin)	3:23
2.	"Blast Off" (with Kaz James; radio edit)	3:07
3.	"Bad" (with Showtek featuring Vassy; radio edit)	2:50
4.	"Shot Me Down" (featuring Skylar Grey; radio edit)	3:11

German CD single
No.	Title	Length
1.	"Lovers on the Sun" (featuring Sam Martin)	3:23
2.	"Lovers on the Sun" (featuring Sam Martin) (extended)	5:55

Japanese CD EP
No.	Title	Length
1.	"Lovers on the Sun" (radio edit)	3:23
2.	"Blast Off" (radio edit)	3:07
3.	"Bad" (radio edit)	2:50
4.	"Shot Me Down" (radio edit)	3:11
5.	"Lovers on the Sun" (extended)	5:55
6.	"Blast Off" (original mix)	5:37
7.	"Bad" (original mix)	4:30
8.	"Shot Me Down" (extended)	5:15

== Credits and personnel ==
- David Guetta – songwriter, producer
- Sam Martin – songwriter, guitar
- Frédéric Riesterer – instruments, producer, songwriter
- Giorgio Tuinfort – songwriter, producer
- Jason Evigan – songwriter, guitar
- Michael Einziger – songwriter, guitar
- Avicii (Tim Bergling) – songwriter, producer, instruments, piano
- Daddy's Groove – additional producer, programming, mixer
- Ralph Wegner – sound designer
- Xavier Stephenson – recording engineer
- Aaron Ahmad – recording engineer
- Paul Power – orchestra recording, orchestra mixer
- Franck van der Heijden – orchestra arrangement, conductor
- Ben Mathot – first violin
- Floortje Beljon – first violin
- Ian de Jong – first violin
- Inger van Vliet – first violin
- Marleen Veldstra – first violin
- Sara de Vries – first violin
- Sofie van der Pol – first violin
- Tseroeja van den Bos – first violin
- Diewertje Wanders – second violin
- Elise Noordhoek – second violin
- Judith Eisenhardt – second violin
- Judith van Driel – second violin
- Maartje Korver – second violin
- Marleen Wester – second violin
- Annemarie Hensens – alt violin
- Bram Faber – alt violin
- Mark Mulder – alt violin
- Yanna Pelser – alt violin
- David Faber – cello
- Jascha Bordon – cello
- Thomas van Geelen – cello
- Hinse Mutter – bass
- Jesse Feves – bass

Credits adapted from CD single.

== Charts ==
=== Weekly charts ===
Weekly chart performance for "Lovers on the Sun"
Chart (2014)	Peak position
Australia (ARIA)	2
Austria (Ö3 Austria Top 40)	1
Belgium (Ultratop 50 Flanders)	4
Belgium (Ultratop 50 Wallonia)	4
Canada Hot 100 (Billboard)	51
Czech Republic Airplay (ČNS IFPI)	1
Czech Republic Singles Digital (ČNS IFPI)	3
Denmark (Tracklisten)	11
Finland (Suomen virallinen lista)	1
France (SNEP)	5
Germany (GfK)	1
Hungary (Dance Top 40)	2
Hungary (Rádiós Top 40)	1
Hungary (Single Top 40)	3
Ireland (IRMA)	3
Israel International Airplay (Media Forest)	2
Italy (FIMI)	4
India International Singles (IMI)	2
Lebanon (The Official Lebanese Top 20)	2
Mexico Anglo (Monitor Latino)	14
Netherlands (Dutch Top 40)	12
Netherlands (Single Top 100)	16
New Zealand (Recorded Music NZ)	25
Norway (VG-lista)	4
Poland Airplay (ZPAV)	3
Poland Dance (ZPAV)	3
Romania Airplay (Media Forest)	9
Russia Airplay (TopHit)	5
Scottish Singles Sales (Official Charts)	1
Slovakia Singles Digital (ČNS IFPI)	7
Slovenia (SloTop50)	5
South Africa Airplay (EMA)	7
Spain (Promusicae)	7
Sweden (Sverigetopplistan)	6
Switzerland (Schweizer Hitparade)	2
UK Singles (Official Charts)	1
UK Dance (Official Charts)	1
Ukraine Airplay (TopHit)	9
US Bubbling Under Hot 100 (Billboard)	21
US Hot Dance/Electronic Songs (Billboard)	12
US Dance Club Songs (Billboard)	3

=== Year-end charts ===
Year-end chart performance for "Lovers on the Sun"
Chart (2014)	Position
Austria (Ö3 Austria Top 40)	24
Belgium (Ultratop Flanders)	37
Belgium (Ultratop Wallonia)	32
Germany (Official German Charts)	14
Hungary (Dance Top 40)	26
Hungary (Rádiós Top 40)	31
Hungary (Single Top 40)	20
Italy (FIMI)	30
Netherlands (Dutch Top 40)	45
Netherlands (Single Top 100)	35
Poland (Dance Top 50)	2
Poland (ZPAV)	41
Russia Airplay (TopHit)	40
Slovenia (SloTop50)	33
Spain (PROMUSICAE)	38
Sweden (Sverigetopplistan)	41
Switzerland (Schweizer Hitparade)	18
Ukraine Airplay (TopHit)	74
UK Singles (Official Charts Company)	60
US Hot Dance/Electronic Songs (Billboard)	36
Chart (2015)	Position
Hungary (Dance Top 40)	41

== Certifications ==
Certifications for "Lovers on the Sun"
Region	Certification	Certified units/sales
Australia (ARIA)	Platinum	70,000^{^}
Austria (IFPI Austria)	Gold	15,000^{*}
Germany (BVMI)	Platinum	400,000^{‡}
Italy (FIMI)	2× Platinum	60,000^{‡}
Mexico (AMPROFON)	Gold	30,000^{*}
New Zealand (RMNZ)	Gold	7,500^{*}
Spain (Promusicae)	Platinum	40,000^{‡}
Sweden (GLF)	3× Platinum	120,000^{‡}
Switzerland (IFPI Switzerland)	Platinum	30,000^{‡}
United Kingdom (BPI)	Platinum	600,000^{‡}
Streaming
Denmark (IFPI Danmark)	Platinum	2,600,000^{†}
Spain (Promusicae)	Platinum	8,000,000^{†}
^{*} Sales figures based on certification alone.^{^} Shipments figures based on certification alone.^{‡} Sales+streaming figures based on certification alone.^{†} Streaming-only figures based on certification alone.

== Release history ==
Release history and formats for "Lovers on the Sun"
Region	Date	Format	Label
France	30 June 2014 (EP)	Digital download	What a Music; Parlophone
France	21 July 2014 (remixes)	Digital download	What a Music; Parlophone
Germany	1 August 2014	CD single	What a Music; Parlophone
United States	5 August 2014	Contemporary hit radio	What a Music; Parlophone
United Kingdom	17 August 2014	Digital download	What a Music; Parlophone
