= List of number-one international songs of 2014 (South Korea) =

The international Gaon Digital Chart is a chart that ranks the best-performing international songs in South Korea. The data is collected by the Korea Music Content Association. Below is a list of songs that topped the weekly and monthly charts, as according to the Gaon 국외 (Foreign) Digital Chart. The Digital Chart ranks songs according to their performance on the Gaon Download, Streaming, and BGM charts.

== Weekly chart ==
Date	Song	Artist	Total downloads
January 4	"How Long Will I Love You"	Ellie Goulding	18,375
January 11	"How Long Will I Love You"	Ellie Goulding	14,879
January 18	"Let It Go"	Idina Menzel	20,617
January 25	"Let It Go"	Idina Menzel	144,816
February 1	"Let It Go"	Idina Menzel	184,498
February 8	"Let It Go"	Idina Menzel	138,969
February 15	"Let It Go"	Idina Menzel	83,555
February 22	"Let It Go"	Idina Menzel	50,517
March 1	"Imagine" (Album Ver.)	Avril Lavigne	55,906
March 8	"Let It Go"	Idina Menzel	34,649
March 15	"Let It Go"	Idina Menzel	28,132
March 22	"Let It Go"	Idina Menzel	24,6722
March 29	"Let It Go"	Idina Menzel	20,810
April 5	"Let It Go"	Idina Menzel	18,320
April 12	"Let It Go"	Idina Menzel	17,132
April 19	"Let It Go"	Idina Menzel	13,548
April 26	"Bad"	David Guetta and Showtek featuring Vassy	16,000
May 3	"Bad"	David Guetta and Showtek featuring Vassy	20,805
May 10	"Overdose"	EXO-M	56,029
May 17	"Love Never Felt So Good"	Michael Jackson	76,248
May 24	"Love Never Felt So Good"	Michael Jackson	41,483
May 31	"Love Someone"	Jason Mraz	68,527
June 7	"Love Never Felt So Good"	Michael Jackson	22,520
June 14	"Bad"	David Guetta & Showtek featuring Vassy	19,726
June 21	"Maps"	Maroon 5	249,367
June 28	"Maps"	Maroon 5	147,009
July 5	"Maps"	Maroon 5	101,525
July 12	"Maps"	Maroon 5	64,171
July 19	"Maps"	Maroon 5	50,117
July 26	"Maps"	Maroon 5	44,339
August 2	"Maps"	Maroon 5	43,198
August 9	"Maps"	Maroon 5	40,579
August 16	"Maps"	Maroon 5	33,822
August 23	"Maps"	Maroon 5	31,800
August 30	"Lost Stars"	Adam Levine	74,690
September 6	"Lost Stars"	Adam Levine	99,492
September 13	"Lost Stars"	Adam Levine	88,713
September 20	"Lost Stars"	Adam Levine	124,417
September 27	"Lost Stars"	Adam Levine	99,695
October 4	"Lost Stars"	Adam Levine	84,224
October 11	"Lost Stars"	Adam Levine	63,354
October 18	"Lost Stars"	Adam Levine	52,265
October 25	"Lost Stars"	Adam Levine	52,209
November 1	"Lost Stars"	Adam Levine	42,296
November 8	"Lost Stars"	Adam Levine	37,763
November 15	"Lost Stars"	Adam Levine	32,221
November 22	"Lost Stars"	Adam Levine	29,199
November 29	"Lost Stars"	Adam Levine	27,382
December 6	"Problem"	Ariana Grande featuring Iggy Azalea	83,697
December 13	"Problem"	Ariana Grande featuring Iggy Azalea	83,542
December 20	"Problem"	Ariana Grande featuring Iggy Azalea	57,820
December 27	"Problem"	Ariana Grande featuring Iggy Azalea	61,088

== Monthly chart ==
Month	Song	Artist	Total downloads
January	"Let It Go"	Idina Menzel	338,435
February	"Let It Go"	Idina Menzel	332,890
March	"Let It Go"	Idina Menzel	119,261
April	"Let It Go"	Idina Menzel	65,013
May	"Bad"	David Guetta and Showtek featuring Vassy	91,324
June	"Maps"	Maroon 5	425,409
July	"Maps"	Maroon 5	262,052
August	"Maps"	Maroon 5	144,800
September	"Lost Stars"	Adam Levine	434,253
October	"Lost Stars"	Adam Levine	251,915
November	"Lost Stars"	Adam Levine	136,726
December	"Problem"	Ariana Grande featuring Iggy Azalea	305,279

== Year-end chart ==
Rank	Song	Artist(s)	Total Downloads
1	"Lost Stars"	Adam Levine	1,035,602
2	"Maps"	Maroon 5	1,135,233
3	"Let It Go" (Deluxe Edition)	Idina Menzel	915,148
4	"Let It Go"	Idina Menzel	821,959
5	"No One Else Like You"	Adam Levine	693,966
6	"Problem"	Ariana Grande featuring Iggy Azalea	553,909
7	"Call You Mine"	Jeff Bernat featuring Geologic	618,581
8	"Tell Me If You Wanna Go Home"	Keira Knightley	539,435
9	"Bad"	David Guetta and Showtek featuring Vassy	516,201
10	"A Step You Can't Take Back"	Keira Knightley	500,647
