= Blast Off (song) =

Single by David Guetta and Kaz James
- Released: 9 June 2014
- Genre: Electronic rock
- Length: 3:07 (radio edit); 5:37 (original mix)
- Label: Jack Back; What a Music; Parlophone
- Songwriters: Alex Van Halen; Eddie Van Halen; David Lee Roth; Michael Anthony; David Guetta; Kaz James; Ralph Wegner; Ebow Graham; Pavan Mukhi; Giorgio Tuinfort
- Producers: David Guetta; Kaz James; Ralph Wegner

David Guetta singles chronology
"Bad" (2014)	"Blast Off" (2014)	"Lovers on the Sun" (2014)

Kaz James singles chronology
"Stars" (2013)	"Blast Off" (2014)	"Show Me All Your Love" (2014)

Music video
- "Blast Off" (lyric video) on YouTube

"Blast Off" is a song by French house music producer and disc jockey (DJ) David Guetta and Australian singer and DJ Kaz James. It was released as a digital download on 9 June 2014. The song was written by Guetta, James, Ralph Wegner, Ebow Graham, Pavan Mukhi, and Giorgio Tuinfort. It features uncredited vocals by Ebow Graham (better known as Metropolis of Foreign Beggars), with additional uncredited guitar performed by Michael Nadeau. The composition is largely based upon the original instrumentation of the song "Ain't Talkin' 'bout Love", by Van Halen. In 2014, "Blast Off" was included in Guetta's Lovers on the Sun EP. The track was also featured on the original motion picture soundtrack of the 2015 film Furious 7. It was later included in the 2015 re-release of Guetta's sixth studio album, entitled Listen Again as a bonus track.

== Music video ==
The animated lyric video, directed by Olivier Boscovitch, was published onto YouTube through Fifth Harmony's official channel on 14 June 2013. Following the comic strip theme used for previous singles "Miss Movin' On" and "Me and My Girls", it features a skateboarding, guitar-playing girl who runs away from home.

== Track listing ==
Digital download – original mix
No.	Title	Length
1.	"Blast Off"	5:37

Digital download – radio edit
No.	Title	Length
1.	"Blast Off"	3:07

Digital download – EP
No.	Title	Length
1.	"Blast Off" (Radio Edit)	3:08
2.	"Bad" (Radio Edit)	2:51
3.	"Shot Me Down" (Radio Edit)	3:11

== Charts ==
Chart (2014)	Peak position
Belgium (Ultratip Bubbling Under Flanders)	33
Belgium (Ultratip Bubbling Under Wallonia)	9
France (SNEP)	33
Hungary (Stream Top 40)	30
South Korea International Downloads (GAON)	27
