= Listen (David Guetta album) =

Studio album by David Guetta
- Released: 21 November 2014
- Recorded: 2013–14
- Genres: EDM; pop
- Length: 50:58
- Labels: What a Music; Parlophone; Atlantic
- Producers: David Guetta; Afrojack; Avicii; Austin Bisnow; Ester Dean; Jason Evigan; Andrew Frampton; Daddy's Groove; Lukas Loules; Sam Martin; Danny O'Donoghue; Showtek; Giorgio Tuinfort; Nicky Romero; Frédéric Riesterer; Stadiumx; Marcus van Wattum; Ralph Wegner

David Guetta chronology
Nothing but the Beat (2011)	Listen (2014)	7 (2018)

Singles from Listen
- 1. "Lovers on the Sun" Released: 30 June 2014; 2. "Dangerous" Released: 6 October 2014; 3. "What I Did for Love" Released: 21 February 2015; 4. "Hey Mama" Released: 16 March 2015; 5. "Sun Goes Down" Released: 31 July 2015; 6. "Bang My Head" Released: 30 October 2015

Listen is the sixth studio album by French DJ and record producer David Guetta. It was released on 21 November 2014. It features collaborations with artists from the R&B, hip-hop, alternative rock and pop worlds such as Sam Martin, Emeli Sandé, the Script, Nicki Minaj, John Legend, Nico & Vinz, Ryan Tedder (the lead singer of pop rock band OneRepublic), Sia, Magic!, Bebe Rexha, Ladysmith Black Mambazo, Ms. Dynamite, Elliphant, Birdy, Jaymes Young, Sonny Wilson, Vassy, and Skylar Grey. It also features additional production from Guetta's frequent collaborator Giorgio Tuinfort, Avicii, Afrojack, Nicky Romero, Showtek, and Stadiumx among others, with additional writing credits from Austin Bisnow, Jason Evigan, Julie Frost, and The-Dream among others.

Listen was preceded by the release of five singles: "Shot Me Down", "Bad", "Blast Off", "Lovers on the Sun" and "Dangerous". The album reached the Top 10 in eighteen countries, including France, Germany, the United Kingdom, the United States and Canada. Reviews were mixed with critics praising the songwriting and catchiness of songs, but criticized the repetitive formula of the album. The album debuted at number 8 on the UK Albums Chart and peaked at number 4 on the US Billboard 200.

== Background ==
Listen is David Guetta's first studio album in three years since the release of the commercially successful Nothing but the Beat (2011), which sold 3 million copies worldwide. According to Guetta, Listen is his most personal album yet, reflecting his divorce from his wife of 22 years, Cathy Guetta: "Until today I was doing lots of songs about happiness and love and sexiness and just having a party – it was basically my life, you know? And lately, my personal life has been a little more difficult, so it reflects also on the album, on the things that we're talking about, on the type of chords. I've never done this, because even for me it was all about making the people dance." Guetta also said he wanted to reinvent himself with the album, steering away from the urban and dance sound he became famous for with One Love (2009):

"When you're a little bit at the top of the game, what is left except being afraid to go down? I never want to feel like this, so I thought that the best way to avoid it was to kind of start from scratch again. Until today I was always starting with the beat and then writing the song on it. This time I was starting with piano, voice and guitar, then producing around the song. I've really changed everything, like the way I was working, the people I was working with – everything."

During an interview with Billboard, Guetta said he has moved away from the current EDM and house sound on his previous two internationally released albums One Love and Nothing but the Beat with Listen, by adding elements of other music such as classical music, acoustic music, and piano ballads: "I miss soul and emotion. A lot of EDM lately is based on production tricks that make it sound huge. I think it's not enough. These songs can be played by a classical orchestra, a rock band, or a funk band, and they would be great. It's not like, 'Oh wow, if you don't have this huge distorted kick, there's nothing else.'"

== Singles ==
Before the release of the lead single, it was preceded by three singles. "Shot Me Down" was released on 3 February 2014 as the first stand-alone single. The track features vocals from American singer Skylar Grey. The song reached number four on the UK Singles Chart. The music video was entirely animated and features visual imagery similar to that on the single cover. It is available on the deluxe edition of Listen and on Listen Again. "Bad" was released on 17 March 2014 as the second stand-alone single. The track features vocals from Australian singer Vassy and production from Showtek. The song reached number twenty-two on the UK Singles Chart. Again, the music video was entirely animated and features scenes of zombies on motorcycles with guns, whilst the army are trying to defend the earth. It is available on the deluxe edition of Listen and on Listen Again. "Blast Off", Guetta's collaboration with Kaz James was released on 9 June 2014. The song was not included on Listen but appears on the Listen Again track list.

- "Lovers on the Sun" was released as the lead single from the album on 30 June 2014. The song features vocals from the American singer Sam Martin. The track reached number one on the UK Singles Chart, and was certified Silver by the BPI. The music video is the first of the album campaign to feature live action footage, but Guetta does not appear in the video. The video features scenes set in what is depicted to be a spaghetti western. As of April 2015, the song has sold 800,000 copies worldwide.
- "Dangerous" was released as the second single from the album on 5 October 2014. The track once again features Martin. The track peaked at number five on the UK Singles Chart.
- "What I Did for Love" was released as the third single from the album. The track features vocals from British singer Emeli Sande. The song was added to the BBC Radio 1 playlist on 26 January 2015, and was released officially in the UK on 21 February 2015. The track peaked at number six on the UK Singles Chart, and reached the top-ten in Scotland, Israel, Austria and Hungary as well as the top-twenty in Australia, Germany and Ireland. The track spent twenty consecutive weeks on the UK Singles Chart.
- "Hey Mama" impacted Top 40 mainstream radio in the US as the fourth single from the album on 17 March 2015. The song features Nicki Minaj and Afrojack. The single proved successful, reaching the top-ten in Australia, UK and the United States as well in 13 additional countries. The song was released to European radio in May 2015.
- On 31 July 2015, David Guetta announced the release of "Sun Goes Down" as the fifth single from the album, with additional production from Dutch electronic duo Showtek featured Canadian reggae-pop band Magic!, and the Dutch singer Sonny Wilson.
- "Clap Your Hands" was unveiled as a teaser from the re-release, Listen Again on 2 October 2015. It is a collaboration between Guetta and Glowinthedark.
- The second single from the re-release, a new version of "Bang My Head" which features vocals by Sia and Fetty Wap, was released on 30 October 2015. The original version peaked at number 79 in France.
- "Pelican" was released on iTunes and Google Play as a promotional single on 20 November 2015. On 16 May 2016 the full version of the track was released exclusively on Beatport.

=== Other charted songs ===
Several other songs charted in France and Germany; "The Whisperer" peaked at number 96 in France and "No Money No Love", "Goodbye Friend", "Listen" and "I'll Keep Loving You" peaked at numbers 94, 93, 85 and 96 in Germany respectively.

== Critical reception ==
Professional ratings
Aggregate scores
Source	Rating
AnyDecentMusic?	4.4/10
Metacritic	51/100
Review scores
Source	Rating
AllMusic	3/5 stars
Billboard	3/5 stars
The Daily Telegraph	3/5 stars
Digital Spy	3/5 stars
Idolator	3.5/5
Newsday	B
The Observer	2/5 stars
Slant Magazine	0.5/5 stars
USA Today	3/4 stars
Virgin Media	3/5 stars

Listen received generally mixed reviews from music critics. At Metacritic, which assigns an average rating out of 100 to reviews from mainstream critics, the album received an average score of 51, based on 9 reviews, which indicates mixed or average reviews. In a mixed review, Megan Buerger of Billboard criticized the album for following the same formula throughout the whole album, however praising Guetta's songwriting on the album. In another mixed review, David Jeffries of AllMusic praised a majority of the tracks included on the album, but criticized Guetta for "seeming like a featured artist on his own album."

In a negative review of the album, Blue Sullivan of Slant Magazine criticized the tracks for being overly repetitive, and the overuse of autotune on the album. In another negative review of the album, Killian Fox of The Guardian criticized the album for not differing from the formula of any of his other albums, and for Guetta playing it safe by sticking in his comfort zone. In a mixed review of the album, Michaelangelo Matos of the Rolling Stone called the songwriting on the album bland, along with criticizing some of the featured artists on the album such as Sam Martin for delivering weak vocal performances. Despite the complaints, he praised the club friendliness of the songs on the album.

== Commercial performance ==
Listen debuted at number 8 on the UK Albums Chart, selling 24,385 copies in its first week. In the United States, the album debuted at number 22 on the Billboard 200, with first-week sales of 25,000 copies. Listen also debuted at number one on the Dance/Electronic Albums chart. After 24 weeks on the Billboard 200, Listen had a big rise, jumping from number 30 to number 4, selling 43,000 units (29,000 in pure album sales), making it Guetta's highest-charting album in the United States. The album topped Billboard Top Dance/Electronic Albums for 5 non-consecutive weeks. Listen was certified gold by the Recording Industry Association of America (RIAA), for combined album sales, on-demand audio, video streams, track sales equivalent of 500,000.

== Track listing ==
Listen – standard version
No.	Title	Writer(s)	Producer(s)	Length
1.	"Dangerous" (featuring Sam Martin)	David Guetta; Giorgio Tuinfort; Sam Martin; Jason Evigan; Lindy Robbins	Guetta; Tuinfort; Martin^{[a]}; Evigan^{[a]}	3:23
2.	"What I Did for Love" (featuring Emeli Sandé)	Guetta; Tuinfort; Breyan Stanley Isaac; DSB; Evigan; Martin; Douglas; Sean Douglas	Guetta; Tuinfort	3:27
3.	"No Money No Love" (with Showtek featuring Elliphant and Ms. Dynamite)	Guetta; Wouter Janssen; Sjoerd Janssen; Nick Rotteveel; Tuinfort; Ester Dean; Terius Nash	Guetta; Showtek; Nicky Romero; Tuinfort	3:57
4.	"Lovers on the Sun" (featuring Sam Martin)	Guetta; Tim Bergling; Tuinfort; Frédéric Riesterer; Michael Einziger; Martin; Evigan	Guetta; Avicii; Tuinfort; Riesterer; Daddy's Groove^{[b]}; Evigan^{[c]}	3:23
5.	"Goodbye Friend" (featuring the Script)	Guetta; Riesterer; Tuinfort; Martin; Evigan; Douglas; Isaac; Danny O'Donoghue; Mark Sheehan; Zsolt Milichovszki; Dávid Nagy	Guetta; Riesterer; Stadiumx; Tuinfort^{[b]}; Andrew Frampton^{[c]}; O'Donoghue^{[c]}	3:49
6.	"Lift Me Up" (featuring Nico & Vinz and Ladysmith Black Mambazo)	Guetta; Tuinfort; Geoffro Early; Danny Majic; Justin Franks; Nico Sereba; Vincent Dery; Julie Frost	Guetta; Tuinfort	3:58
7.	"Listen" (featuring John Legend)	Guetta; Tuinfort; Austin Bisnow; Riesterer; Evigan; John Stephens; Sarah Rayne; Joaquin Howard Banuelos	Guetta; Tuinfort; Austin Bis^{[b]}	3:46
8.	"Bang My Head" (featuring Sia)	Guetta; Tuinfort; Rotteveel; Marcus van Wattum; Lars Christian Karlsson; Sia Furler; Vincent Pontare; Magnus Lidehäll	Guetta; Tuinfort; Romero; Wattum	3:53
9.	"Yesterday" (featuring Bebe Rexha)	Guetta; Bergling; Tuinfort; Bebe Rexha; Douglas	Guetta; Avicii; Tuinfort	4:03
10.	"Hey Mama" (featuring Nicki Minaj and Afrojack)	Guetta; Tuinfort; Nick van de Wall; Dean; Rexha; Douglas; Nicki Minaj	Guetta; Afrojack; Tuinfort; Dean^{[a]}	3:12
11.	"Sun Goes Down" (with Showtek featuring Magic! and Sonny Wilson)	Guetta; Tuinfort; W. Janssen; S. Janssen; Nasri Atweh; Lukas Loules; Mark Pellizzer	Guetta; Showtek; Lukas Loules	3:31
12.	"S.T.O.P" (featuring Ryan Tedder)	Guetta; Tuinfort; Pierre-Luc Rioux; Justin Davey; Vinay Vyas; Ryan Tedder	Guetta; Tuinfort	3:34
13.	"I'll Keep Loving You" (featuring Birdy and Jaymes Young)	Guetta; Riesterer; Tuinfort; Teemu Brunila; Jaymes Young; Birdy; Matt Dragstrem	Guetta; Riesterer	3:08
14.	"The Whisperer" (featuring Sia)	Guetta; Tuinfort; Furler	Guetta; Tuinfort	3:54
Total length:				50:58

Listen – limited edition (bonus disc)
No.	Title	Writer(s)	Producer(s)	Length
15.	"Bad" (radio edit; with Showtek featuring Vassy)	David Guetta; W. Janssen; S. Janssen; Tuinfort; Ossama Al Sarraf; Ned Shepard; Manuel Reuter; Vasiliki Karagiorgos; Nick Turpin	Guetta; Showtek; Sultan + Shepard; Reuter	2:50
16.	"Rise" (featuring Skylar Grey)	Guetta; Tuinfort; Holly Brook Hafermann; Claude Kelly	Guetta; Tuinfort	3:55
17.	"Shot Me Down" (radio edit; featuring Skylar Grey)	Guetta; Tuinfort; Sonny Bono	Guetta; Tuinfort; Ralph Wegner^{[a]}	3:11
18.	"Dangerous" (Robin Schulz remix radio edit; featuring Sam Martin)	Guetta; Tuinfort; Martin; Evigan; Robbins	Guetta; Tuinfort; Martin^{[a]}; Evigan^{[a]}; Robin Schulz^{[r]}	3:20
Total length:				64:14

=== Listen Again ===
Listen Again – disc one
No.	Title	Writer(s)	Producer(s)	Length
1.	"Dangerous" (featuring Sam Martin)	David Guetta; Giorgio Tuinfort; Sam Martin; Jason Evigan; Lindy Robbins	Guetta; Tuinfort; Martin^{[a]}; Evigan^{[a]}	3:23
2.	"What I Did for Love" (featuring Emeli Sandé)	Guetta; Tuinfort; Breyan Stanley Isaac; DSB; Evigan; Martin; Douglas; Sean Douglas	Guetta; Tuinfort	3:27
3.	"No Money No Love" (with Showtek featuring Elliphant and Ms. Dynamite)	Guetta; Wouter Janssen; Sjoerd Janssen; Nick Rotteveel; Tuinfort; Ester Dean; Terius Nash	Guetta; Showtek; Nicky Romero; Tuinfort	3:57
4.	"Lovers on the Sun" (with Avicii featuring Sam Martin)	Guetta; Tim Bergling; Tuinfort; Frédéric Riesterer; Michael Einziger; Martin; Evigan	Guetta; Avicii; Tuinfort; Riesterer; Daddy's Groove^{[b]}; Evigan^{[c]}	3:23
5.	"Goodbye Friend" (featuring The Script)	Guetta; Riesterer; Tuinfort; Martin; Evigan; Douglas; Isaac; Danny O'Donoghue; Mark Sheehan; Zsolt Milichovszki; Dávid Nagy	Guetta; Riesterer; Stadiumx; Tuinfort^{[b]}; Andrew Frampton^{[c]}; O'Donoghue^{[c]}	3:49
6.	"Lift Me Up" (featuring Nico & Vinz and Ladysmith Black Mambazo)	Guetta; Tuinfort; Geoffro Early; Danny Majic; Justin Franks; Nico Sereba; Vincent Dery; Julie Frost	Guetta; Tuinfort	3:58
7.	"Listen" (featuring John Legend)	Guetta; Tuinfort; Austin Bisnow; Riesterer; Evigan; John Stephens; Sarah Rayne; Joaquin Howard Banuelos	Guetta; Tuinfort; Austin Bis^{[c]}	3:46
8.	"Bang My Head" (featuring Sia)	Guetta; Tuinfort; Rotteveel; Marcus van Wattum; Christian Karlsson; Sia Furler; Vincent Pontare; Magnus Lidehäll	Guetta; Tuinfort; Romero; Wattum	3:53
9.	"Yesterday" (featuring Bebe Rexha)	Guetta; Bergling; Tuinfort; Bebe Rexha; Douglas	Guetta; Avicii; Tuinfort	4:03
10.	"Hey Mama" (with Afrojack featuring Nicki Minaj and Bebe Rexha)	Guetta; Tuinfort; Nick van de Wall; Dean; Rexha; Douglas; Nicki Minaj	Guetta; Afrojack; Tuinfort; Dean^{[a]}	3:12
11.	"Sun Goes Down" (with Showtek featuring Magic! and Sonny Wilson)	Guetta; Tuinfort; W. Janssen; S. Janssen; Nasri Atweh; Lukas Loules; Mark Pellizzer	Guetta; Showtek; Lukas Loules	3:31
12.	"S.T.O.P" (featuring Ryan Tedder)	Guetta; Tuinfort; Pierre-Luc Rioux; Justin Davey; Vinay Vyas; Ryan Tedder	Guetta; Tuinfort	3:34
13.	"I'll Keep Loving You" (featuring Birdy and Jaymes Young)	Guetta; Riesterer; Tuinfort; Teemu Brunila; Jaymes Young; Birdy; Matt Dragstrem	Guetta; Riesterer	3:08
14.	"The Whisperer" (featuring Sia)	Guetta; Tuinfort; Furler	Guetta; Tuinfort	3:54
Total length:				50:58

Listen Again – disc two
No.	Title	Writer(s)	Producer(s)	Length
1.	"Bang My Head" (featuring Sia and Fetty Wap)	David Guetta; Giorgio Tuinfort; Nick Rotteveel; Marcus van Wattum; Christian Karlsson; Willie Maxwell II; Sia Furler; Vincent Pontare; Magnus Lidehäll	Guetta; Tuinfort; Nicky Romero; van Wattum	3:13
2.	"Clap Your Hands" (with Glowinthedark)	Guetta; Martijn Garritsen; Albert Harvey; Kevin Ramos; Thomas Leithead-Docherty	Guetta; Martin Garrix; Glowinthedark; Thomas Leithead-Docherty	3:55
3.	"Bad" (radio edit; with Showtek featuring Vassy)	Guetta; Wouter Janssen; Sjoerd Janssen; Tuinfort; Ossama Al Sarraf; Ned Shepard; Manuel Reuter; Vasiliki Karagiorgos; Nicholas Turpin	Guetta; Showtek; Sultan + Shepard; Reuter	2:50
4.	"Shot Me Down" (radio edit; featuring Skylar Grey)	Guetta; Tuinfort; Sonny Bono	Guetta; Tuinfort; Ralph Wegner^{[a]}	3:07
5.	"Blast Off" (radio edit; with Kaz James)	Guetta; Kaz James; Tuinfort; Ebow Graham; Pavan Mukhi; Ralph Wegner	Guetta; Tuinfort; Wegner	3:08
6.	"The Death of EDM" (with Showtek featuring Beardyman)	Guetta; W. Janssen; S. Janssen; Darren Foreman	Guetta; Showtek	4:55
7.	"Pelican" (edit)	Guetta; Ralph Wegner; Frederic Riesterer	Guetta; Ralph Wegner; Riesterer	3:25
8.	"Bang My Head" (Glowinthedark Remix; featuring Sia)	Guetta; Tuinfort; Rotteveel; van Wattum; Karlsson; Maxwell; Furler; Pontare; Lidehäll	Guetta; Tuinfort; Romero; Wattum; Glowinthedark^{[r]}	3:48
Total length:				28:21

Listen Again – disc two (Japanese version)
No.	Title	Writer(s)	Producer(s)	Length
1.	"Bang My Head" (featuring Sia and Fetty Wap)	David Guetta; Giorgio Tuinfort; Nick Rotteveel; Marcus van Wattum; Christian Karlsson; Willie Maxwell II; Sia Furler; Vincent Pontare; Magnus Lidehäll	Guetta; Tuinfort; Nicky Romero; van Wattum	3:13
2.	"Clap Your Hands" (with Glowinthedark)	Guetta; Albert Harvey; Kevin Ramos; Thomas Leithead-Docherty	Guetta; Glowinthedark; Thomas Leithead-Docherty	3:55
3.	"Bad" (radio edit; with Showtek featuring Vassy)	Guetta; Wouter Janssen; Sjoerd Janssen; Tuinfort; Ossama Al Sarraf; Ned Shepard; Manuel Reuter; Vasiliki Karagiorgos; Nicholas Turpin	Guetta; Showtek; Sultan + Shepard; Reuter	2:50
4.	"Shot Me Down" (radio edit; featuring Skylar Grey)	Guetta; Tuinfort; Sonny Bono	Guetta; Tuinfort; Ralph Wegner^{[a]}	3:07
5.	"The Death of EDM" (with Showtek featuring Beardyman)	Guetta; W. Janssen; S. Janssen; Darren Foreman	Guetta; Showtek	4:55
6.	"Pelican" (edit)	Guetta; Ralph Wegner; Frederic Riesterer	Guetta; Ralph Wegner; Riesterer	3:25
7.	"Hey Mama" (JP edit; with Afrojack featuring Nicki Minaj and Bebe Rexha)	Guetta; Tuinfort; Nick van de Wall; Dean; Rexha; Douglas; Onika Maraj	Guetta; Afrojack; Tuinfort; Dean^{[a]}	3:13
8.	"What I Did for Love" (JP edit; featuring Namie Amuro)	Guetta; Tuinfort; Breyan Stanley Isaac; Evigan; Martin; Sean Douglas	Guetta; Tuinfort	3:28
Total length:				35:02

Listen Again – Disc three (Listenin' Continuous Mix)
No.	Title	Length
1.	"Listenin' (Intro)"	1:13
2.	"What I Did for Love vs. S.T.O.P." (featuring Emeli Sandé and Ryan Tedder)	1:27
3.	"What I Did for Love" (Morten Remix; featuring Emeli Sandé)	2:27
4.	"Lovers on the Sun" (Stadiumx Remix; with Avicii featuring Sam Martin)	3:37
5.	"Yesterday vs. Lift Me Up" (featuring Bebe Rexha, Nico & Vinz and Ladysmith Black Mambazo)	2:44
6.	"Dangerous" (Robin Schulz Remix; featuring Sam Martin)	2:15
7.	"Dangerous" (David Guetta Banging Remix; featuring Sam Martin)	2:45
8.	"Sun Goes Down" (Brooks Remix; with Showtek featuring Magic! and Sonny Wilson)	1:35
9.	"Sun Goes Down" (Hugel Remix; with Showtek featuring Magic! and Sonny Wilson)	2:25
10.	"Bang My Head" (Glowinthedark Big-Remix; featuring Sia)	2:52
11.	"Hey Mama" (Noodles Remix; with Afrojack featuring Nicki Minaj and Bebe Rexha)	1:43
12.	"Hey Mama" (Afrojack Remix; with Afrojack featuring Nicki Minaj and Bebe Rexha)	0:31
13.	"Hey Mama" (Club Killers Remix; featuring Nicki Minaj, Bebe Rexha and Afrojack)	2:13
14.	"Hey Mama" (Cesquaux x Jeremia Jones Revisited Remix; with Afrojack featuring Nicki Minaj and Bebe Rexha)	0:41
15.	"I'll Keep Loving You vs. Yesterday" (featuring Birdy, Jaymes Young, and Bebe Rexha)	2:48
16.	"Lift Me Up vs. Bang My Head" (featuring Nico & Vinz, Ladysmith Black Mambazo, and Sia)	2:52
17.	"S.T.O.P. vs. Goodbye Friend" (featuring Ryan Tedder and the Script)	2:52
18.	"Clap Your Hands" (with Glowinthedark)	3:22
19.	"Bad" (with Showtek featuring Vassy)	3:30
20.	"Blast Off" (with Kaz James)	3:40
21.	"Shot Me Down" (featuring Skylar Grey)	3:19
22.	"The Death of EDM" (with Showtek featuring Beardyman)	3:08
23.	"Hey Mama vs. The Whisperer" (with Afrojack featuring Nicki Minaj, Bebe Rexha and Sia)	2:07

Listen Again – disc three (Listenin' Continuous Mix) (Digital & Streaming bonus track)
No.	Title	Length
24.	"Listenin' (Continuous Mix)"	56:17

Notes

- ^{^[a]} signifies a co-producer.
- ^{^[b]} signifies an additional producer.
- ^{^[c]} signifies a vocal producer.
- "Yesterday" features a sample from "Rehab" by Amy Winehouse, however, it is performed by Bebe Rexha.
- On the physical version of the album, an unreleased version of "The Death of EDM" was used for the Listenin' Continuous Mix.

== Charts ==
=== Weekly charts ===
Weekly chart performance for Listen
Chart (2014–2016)	Peak position
Australian Albums (ARIA)	11
Austrian Albums (Ö3 Austria)	3
Belgian Albums (Ultratop Flanders)	4
Belgian Albums (Ultratop Wallonia)	6
Canadian Albums (Billboard)	8
Danish Albums (Hitlisten)	7
Dutch Albums (Album Top 100)	11
Finnish Albums (Suomen virallinen lista)	19
French Albums (SNEP)	3
German Albums (Offizielle Top 100)	3
Hungarian Albums (MAHASZ)	1
Irish Albums (IRMA)	9
Italian Albums (FIMI)	8
Japanese Albums (Oricon)	23
New Zealand Albums (RMNZ)	15
Norwegian Albums (VG-lista)	4
Portuguese Albums (AFP)	19
Scottish Albums (Official Charts)	9
South African Albums (RISA)	13
Spanish Albums (Promusicae)	8
Swedish Albums (Sverigetopplistan)	6
Swiss Albums (Schweizer Hitparade)	2
UK Albums (Official Charts)	8
UK Dance Albums (Official Charts)	1
US Billboard 200	4
US Top Dance Albums (Billboard)	1

=== Year-end charts ===
2014 year-end chart performance for Listen
Chart (2014)	Position
Belgian Albums (Ultratop Flanders)	79
Belgian Albums (Ultratop Wallonia)	55
French Albums (SNEP)	26
Germany (Official German Charts)	42
Italian Albums (FIMI)	64
Swiss Albums (Schweizer Hitparade)	48
UK Albums (OCC)	92

2015 year-end chart performance for Listen
Chart (2015)	Position
Australian Albums (ARIA)	82
Belgian Albums (Ultratop Flanders)	50
Belgian Albums (Ultratop Wallonia)	32
Dutch Albums (Album Top 100)	91
French Albums (SNEP)	42
German Albums (Offizielle Top 100)	94
Hungarian Albums (MAHASZ)	18
Italian Albums (FIMI)	91
Swedish Albums (Sverigetopplistan)	18
Swiss Albums (Schweizer Hitparade)	14
UK Albums (OCC)	64
US Billboard 200	53
US Top Dance/Electronic Albums (Billboard)	1

2016 year-end chart performance for Listen
Chart (2016)	Position
Swiss Albums (Schweizer Hitparade)	91

"I'll Keep Loving You"
Chart (2015)	Peak position
Germany (GfK)	96
France (SNEP)	144

== Certifications ==
Certifications for Listen
Region	Certification	Certified units/sales
Australia (ARIA)	Gold	35,000^{^}
Austria (IFPI Austria)	Gold	7,500^{*}
Canada (Music Canada)	Platinum	80,000^{‡}
Denmark (IFPI Danmark)	Platinum	20,000^{‡}
France (SNEP)	2× Platinum	200,000^{*}
Germany (BVMI)	Platinum	200,000^{‡}
Hungary (MAHASZ)	Platinum	2,000^{^}
Italy (FIMI)	Gold	25,000^{*}
Mexico (AMPROFON)	Gold	30,000^{^}
Netherlands (NVPI)	Gold	20,000^{‡}
New Zealand (RMNZ) Deluxe edition	2× Platinum	30,000^{‡}
Poland (ZPAV)	Platinum	20,000^{‡}
Singapore (RIAS)	Gold	5,000^{*}
Spain (Promusicae)	Gold	20,000^{‡}
Sweden (GLF)	2× Platinum	80,000^{‡}
Switzerland (IFPI Switzerland)	Platinum	20,000^{^}
United Kingdom (BPI)	Platinum	300,000^{‡}
United States (RIAA)	Gold	500,000^{‡}
^{*} Sales figures based on certification alone.^{^} Shipments figures based on certification alone.^{‡} Sales+streaming figures based on certification alone.

== Release history ==
Release history and formats for Listen
Region	Date	Format(s)	Label
Australia	21 November 2014	CD; LP; digital download	What a Music; Parlophone
Germany	21 November 2014	CD; LP; digital download	What a Music; Parlophone
New Zealand	21 November 2014	CD; LP; digital download	What a Music; Parlophone
France	24 November 2014	CD; LP; digital download	What a Music; Parlophone
Italy	24 November 2014	CD; LP; digital download	What a Music; Parlophone
United Kingdom	24 November 2014	CD; LP; digital download	What a Music; Parlophone
United States	24 November 2014	CD; LP; digital download	What a Music; Atlantic
