= Vinai =

Italian Duo DJs from Brescia

VINAI
- Origin: Brescia, Lombardy, Italy
- Genres: EDM, big room house, future bass, Melbourne bounce, bass house, electro house, progressive house, Dutch house
- Years active: 2010–present
- Labels: Spinnin' Records, Zerothirty, Dragon X, Time Records, Rave Culture
- Members: Alessandro Vinai; Andrea Vinai

VINAI (stylized in all caps) is an Italian EDM production and DJ duo, formed in 2011 consisting of brothers Alessandro Vinai (born 25 January 1990) and Andrea Vinai (born 10 January 1994).

== Career ==
After working on individual projects, they formed Vinai. In 2013, they signed with Time Records before releasing the single "Hands Up". Vinai's collaborative single with Swedish DJs Error404 titled "Bullet" earned them higher recognition.

In 2014, they joined Spinnin' Records and released a single with Canadian DJs DVBBS titled "Raveology".

They performed at the 2015 Ultra Music Festival in Miami, Florida, as among the additional lineup. They also performed at Mysteryland in March 2015.

During 2017, they participated for the third consecutive year at Tomorrowland, and they founded their own record label named Zerothirty.

== Discography ==
=== Singles ===
List of title, year, peak chart positions and album
Title	Year	Peak chart positions	
Title	Year	BEL	US Dance
"Raveology" (with Dvbbs)	2014	34	—
"Bounce Generation" (with TJR)	2014	62	—
"How We Party" (with R3hab)	2014	—	32
"Louder" (with Dimitri Vegas & Like Mike)	2015	42	—
"Legend"	2015	—	—
"The Wave" (featuring Harrison)	2015	—	—
"Frontier"	2015	—	—
"Techno"	2015	—	—
"Sit Down" (with Harrison)	2016	—	—
"LIT" (with Olly James)	2016	—	—
"Get Ready Now"	2016	—	—
"Into the Fire" (featuring Anjulie)	2016	—	—
"Stand by Me" (with Streex featuring Micky Blue)	2016	—	—
"Where the Water Ends" (with Anjulie)	2017	—	—
"Time for the Techno" (vs. Carnage)	2017	—	—
"Take my Breath Away" (with 22Bullets featuring Donna Lugassy)	2017	—	—
"Parade"	2017	—	—
"Everything I Need" (with Redfoo)	2018	—	—
"Out of This Town" (with Hardwell featuring Cat Meekins)	2018	—	—
"Wild" (featuring Fatman Scoop)	2019	—	—
"Break the Beat" (with Harris & Ford)	2019	—	—
"5AM" (with Aly Ryan)	2019	—	—
"How I Like It"	2019	—	—
"Rise Up" (featuring Vamero)	2020	—	—
"On N On" (featuring Leony)	2020	—	—
"Up All Night" (with Hard Lights featuring Afrojack)	2020	—	—
"I Was Made" (with Le Pedre)	2020	—	—
"Touch"	2021	—	—
"Hide Away" (with LA Vision)	2021	—	—
"Abbronzatissima" (with Häwk)	2022	—	—
"—" denotes a single that did not chart or was not released.

=== Remixes ===
2012

- Pound The Alarm - Nicki Minaj
- Sexy And I Know It - LMFAO
- Te Quiero Mi Amor - DJ Samuel Kimk
- Me Gusta - Desaparecidos

2013

- Rain On My Shoulder - J. Nice and Frank Tedesco featuring Lil'Lee
- RocknnRolla - Bestfors featuring Manu LJ

2014

- Sasha Gray - DJ KUBA and Neitan
- Miami - Niels Van Gogh featuring Princess Superstar
- Escape With Me - DJ Kuba and Neitan vs. Cherry featuring Jonny Rose
- Loco - Joel Fletcher and Seany B
- Horizon - Kid Massive and Databoy
- Unstoppable - R3hab featuring Eva Simons
- Soundwave - R3hab featuring Trevor Guthrie

2015

- What I Did For Love - David Guetta featuring Emeli Sandé
- Nova - Dimitri Vegas & Like Mike vs. Tujamo and Felguk
- Neon Future - Steve Aoki featuring Luke Steele of Empire of the Sun
- Keep Shining - Redfoo

2017

- Paris - The Chainsmokers

2019

- Cold - Boy In Space and Unheard

== Awards and nominations ==
=== DJ Magazine top 100 DJs ===
Year	Position	Notes	Ref.
2014	62	New Entry	
2015	43	Up 19	
2016	37	Up 6	
2017	32	Up 5	
2018	26	Up 6	
2019	28	Down 2	
2020	39	Down 11	
2021	51	Down 12	
2022	45	Up 6	
2023	51	Down 6	
