= Muzzaik =

- Origin: Hungary
- Genres: Tribal house
- Occupations: DJs, record producers
- Years active: 2002–present
- Members: Dániel Dalmady (Danny-L); Zsolt Milichovszki (Sullivan / Sully)
- Website: muzzaik.com

Muzzaik is a Hungarian music production duo made up of DJ/producers Dániel Dalmady (also known as Danny-L) and Zsolt Milichovszki (also known as Sullivan/Sully). The deep/tribal house duo was formed in 2002.

== Musical Career ==
Muzzaik made a series of releases under the Tribalground title. The initial Tribalground EP was released in 2003, with volume 2 in 2004 and volume 3 in 2006. They also promoted local Romanian music through the Underground Sound of Hungary EP in 2005. A 2 CD studio album Between the Beats was released in 2007. The duo also formed the music project Midtown Massif.

In 2016, they had a joint release with Hungarian progressive DJ project Stadiumx of "So Much Love". Stadiumx is a duo made up of Dávid Nagy (known as Dave) and Muzzaik's Zsolt Milichovszki (Sully). The song is an adaptation of an earlier release "So Much Love to Give" by French house duo Together, consisting of Thomas Bangalter and DJ Falcon, also remixed in 2011 by Fedde Le Grand, all using a line from the original "Love's Such a Wonderful Thing" by the UK band The Real Thing.

Muzzaik also features the monthly podcast This is Niteflight!, loaded with their choice of best house tracks from around the globe.
