= No Worries (Disciples and David Guetta song) =

Single by Disciples and David Guetta
- Released: 15 April 2016
- Recorded: 2015
- Genre: House
- Length: 3:28
- Label: Parlophone; Warner
- Songwriter(s): Curtis Richardson; Daniel Amell; David Guetta; Gavin Koolman; Luke McDermott; Nathan Duvhall
- Producer(s): Disciples; Guetta; Frederic Riesterer; Ralph Wegner

Disciples singles chronology
"Mastermind" (2015)	"No Worries" (2016)	"Daylight" (2016)

David Guetta singles chronology
"Listen" (2016)	"No Worries" (2016)	"This One's for You" (2016)

"No Worries" is a song by British production trio Disciples and French house music producer and disc jockey David Guetta. The song was released as a digital download on 15 April 2016. The song has peaked at number 90 on the Australian Singles Chart. The song was written by David Guetta, Nathan Duvall, Gavin Koolman, Luke McDermott, Curtis Richardson, Daniel Amell, Frederic Riesterer, and Ralph Wegner, while vocals are by Curtis Richa.

== Charts ==
Chart performance for "No Worries"
Chart (2015)	Peak position
Australia (ARIA)	90
Belgium Dance (Ultratop Flanders)	24

== Release history ==
Release history and formats for "No Worries"
Region	Date	Format	Label	Ref.
Europe	26 November 2015	Digital download	Parlophone; Warner	
Italy	15 April 2016	Contemporary hit radio	Warner	
Australia	15 April 2016	Digital download	Parlophone; Warner	
Canada	15 April 2016	Digital download	Parlophone; Warner	
New Zealand	15 April 2016	Digital download	Parlophone; Warner	
United Kingdom	15 April 2016	Digital download	Parlophone; Warner	
United States	15 April 2016	Digital download	Parlophone; Warner	
