= Glowinthedark =

Dutch DJ and record production duo

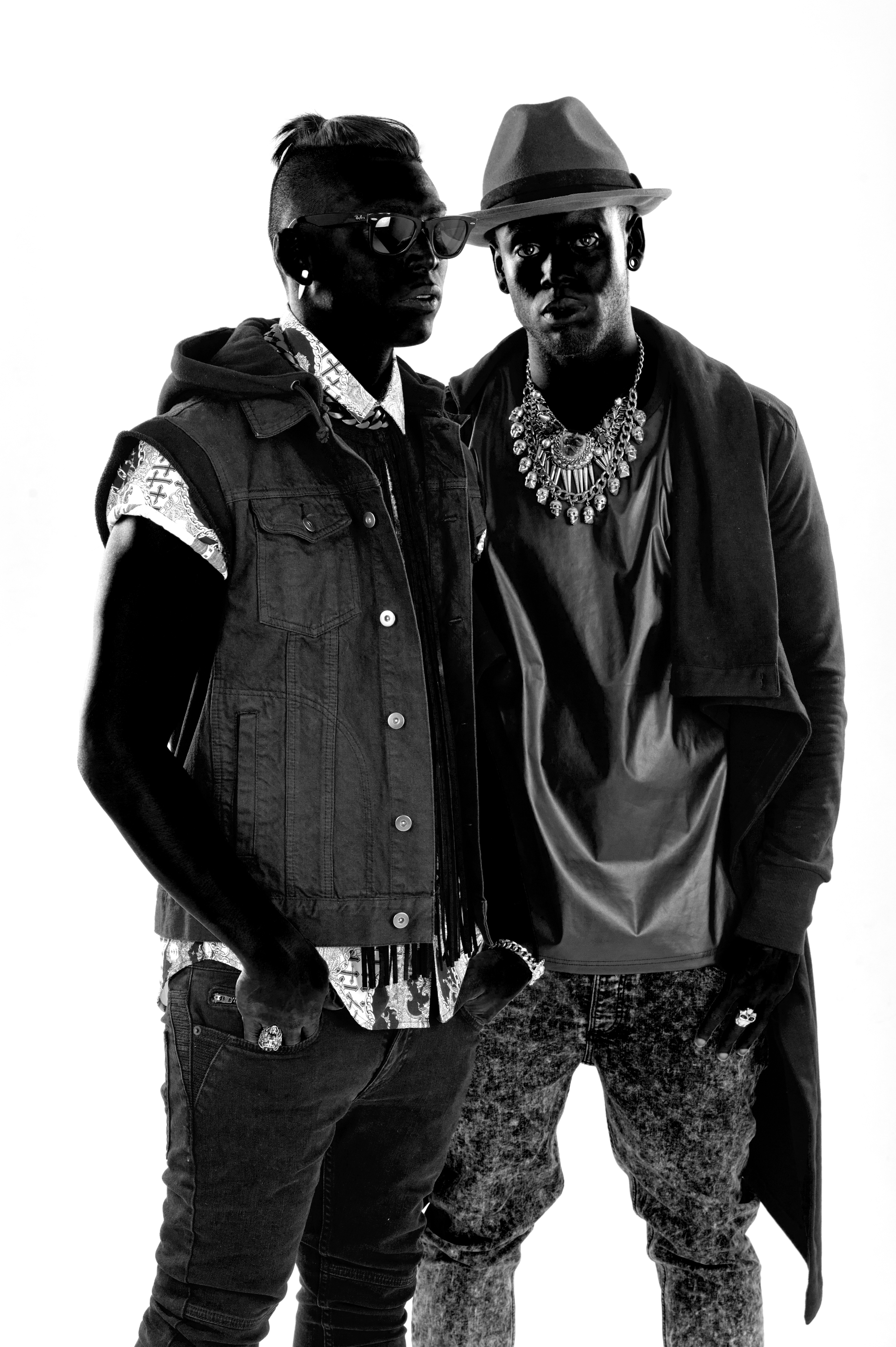

Background information
- Origin: The Hague, Netherlands
- Genres: Electro house, house, pop, dance, trap, Dutch house
- Years active: 2009–present
- Members: Albert Harvey; Kevin Ramos

Glowinthedark (stylised as GLOWINTHEDARK) is a Dutch DJ and record production duo from The Hague, consisting of Albert Harvey (born 1986) and Kevin Ramos (born 1987).

== Biography ==
Albert Harvey and Kevin Ramos both grew up in the Netherlands.

=== Albert Harvey ===
Albert learned how to play piano at the age of 8. When he was 17 he started producing. He studied ‘Music Production’ at the Albeda College in Schiedam and started DJing at clubs when he was 20.

=== Kevin Ramos ===
Kevin's father was a Latin singer and his mother a soul and funky jazz singer. When he was 14 he played at small parties and celebrations, two years later he started playing in clubs.

== Fashion ==
Besides making music, Glowinthedark is working on a fashion line containing clothes, accessories and a DJ-bag.

== Career ==
In 2010, Glowinthedark released their first single; "Electronic Life" on Döner Digital Records, a collaboration with Jody Meyer.

A few months after the release of their first single, they released The Battalion EP together with Jack Ferreira, this EP contained the tracks "Morscode", "Juggernaut" and "Go Fast".

Two months later the duo released a song on DJ Chuckie's label Dirty Dutch Music; "Jump".

In 2011, Glowinthedark produced a remix of DJ Chuckie's track "Who Is Ready to Jump", in April 2012 they teamed up and released "Electro Dude". In 2013 Glowinthedark made the official anthem for Dirty Dutch Aftershock; "Say Whoo".

In June 2013, "Ain't a Party" was released on David Guetta's label Jack Back Records. The track is featured on the F*ck Me I’m Famous Ibiza 2013 Mix by David Guetta.

On 23 December 2013, a song with DJ Chuckie was released on Spinnin' Records; "NRG". A few weeks later on 10 January 2014 Glowinthedark and Ben Saunders, the winner of The Voice Of Holland, released "What You Do" on 8ball Music.

On 17 February 2014, Glowinthedark released their collaboration with Alvaro on Powerhouse Music, "Charged".

Alongside producing music, Glowinthedark performs at events in the Netherlands and overseas. Since 2011 they've been resident DJs at Blue Marlin Ibiza and Beach Club Bloomingdale in Bloemendaal. In the summer of 2013 GLOWINTHEDARK had their first residency at Pacha Ibiza, in the same year they joined the Pacha World Tour, a tour initiated by Pacha across all similar named clubs in the world. Some other events and venues where Glowinthedark has performed are: Mysteryland, Tomorrowland, the Amsterdam dance event and the Winter Music Conference.

Besides performing Glowinthedark gives DJ/producer seminars at schools and events like Dance Fair and the Amsterdam dance event.

== Lightstate ==
Glowinthedark has their own international radio show, Lightstate. The hour-long radio show has theme tracks and a weekly changing guest mix. Lightstate is a part of the weekend schedule of Dutch radio station SLAM!FM, the Tokyo based radio station Block.FM, Spanish radio stations Mortal FM and Fun Radio and Lightstate is also aired in Sri Lanka on Sun FM.

== Discography ==
=== Singles ===
Title	Date of release	Label	Other artists	Albums
"Electronic Life"	19 January 2010	Döner Digital Records	Jody Meyer	No More Idols! The Garlic Chronicles EDM Top 50 The Best EDM Tracks Of 2013
"Morscode"	1 September 2010	Selekted Music	Jack Ferreira	The Battalion EP Selekted at Amsterdam dance event 2010
"Juggernaut"	1 September 2010	Selekted Music	Jack Ferreira	The Battalion EP Get Lucky Vol.2
"Go Fast"	1 September 2010	Selekted Music	Jack Ferreira	The Battalion EP Dutch Dirt Vol.2
"Heisse Sheisse (Original Mix)"	17 November 2010	Sony Music Entertainment	QF	Heisse Sheisse
"Jump (Original Mix)"	17 November 2010	Dirty Dutch Music	—N/a	DJ Chuckie Presents Dirty Dutch Vol.2 Dirty Dutch Fallout Mixed by DJ Chuckie Dirty Dutch Fallout Unmixed Ultimate Dutch House Anthems House Nation Vol.3
"Fux (Original Mix)"	7 February 2011	Dirty Dutch Music	Willy Monfret	DJ Chuckie Presents Dirty Dutch Digital Vol.3 Ibiza 2011 Presented By Dirty Dutch Records Tunes To Lose Your Shit To Ultimate Dutch Dance Anthems Dutch Miami Anthems House Nation Vol.3
"Control Myself (Original Mix)"	1 July 2011	Selekted Music	—N/a	—N/a
"Wojo (Original Mix)"	1 July 2011	Selekted Music	—N/a	—N/a
"Maskara (Original Mix)"	21 July 2011	Dirty Dutch Music	—N/a	Ibiza 2011 Presented By Dirty Dutch Dirty Dutch Digital Vol.4 Dirty Dutch Blackout Deluxe Edition Dutch House Anthems The Best Of Dutch House Miami Electro
"Lights Out (Original Mix)"	13 February 2012	Dirty Dutch Music	—N/a	EDM Progressive House
"Electro Dude (Original Mix)"	30 April 2012	Big Beat Records	Chuckie	The Best Of DJ Chuckie
"I'm F****d Up"	6 December 2012	Cause A Ruckus	DJ Ruckus and Hot Rod	—N/a
"Say Whoo (Official Dirty Dutch Aftershock Anthem)"	24 February 2013	Dirty Dutch Music	—N/a	—N/a
"Ain't a Party"	17 June 2013	Jack Back Records	David Guetta and Harrison	F*ck Me I’m Famous Ibiza 2013 Mix
"Death Of Triplets (Original Mix)"	14 October 2013	—N/a	Willy Monfret	—N/a
"NRG (Original Mix)"	23 December 2013	Spinnin' Records	Chuckie	—N/a
"What You Do (Original Mix)"	10 January 2014	8ball Music	Ben Saunders	—N/a
"Charged"	17 February 2014	Powerhouse Music	Alvaro	—N/a
"MUG"	21 February 2014	Spinnin' Records	Danny Howard and T3nbears	—N/a
"Bombay"	8 September 2014	Armada Trice	Askery	—N/a
"Rave Century"	16 September 2014	Dim Mak Records	Deorro	—N/a
"Ozzie"	19 January 2015	Hussle Recordings	Uberjak'd	—N/a
"Get Over You"	6 February 2015	Lightstate Music	ADAM	—N/a
"Clap Your Hands"	2 October 2015	Parlophone	David Guetta	Listen Again
"Jump"	3 October 2019	What a Music	David Guetta	—N/a

=== Remixes ===
Title	Original artist(s)	Date of release	Label
God Will Set Me Free (GLOWINTHEDARK Remix)	Leroy Styles	19-11-2009	Afrazoo
Past Tense (GLOWINTHEDARK & Genairo Nvilla Remix)	Leroy Styles	20-09-2010	Afrazoo
The Nvilla Anthem (GLOWINTHEDARK Remix)	Genairo Nvilla	22-10-2010	Selekted Music
Be Afraid (GLOWINTHEDARK Remix)	MYNC, Ron Carroll, and Dan Castro	28-08-2011	Cr2 Records
Who Is Ready To Jump (GLOWINTHEDARK Higher club Remix)	Chuckie	12-12-2011	Big Beat Records
Make Some Noise (GLOWINTHEDARK Remix & Wax Motif Trap)	Chuckie and Junxterjack	07-12-2012	Cr2 Records
Fucking Best Song Ever (Chuckie & GLOWINTHEDARK Remix)	Wallpaper	2012	—N/a
Party Right (GLOWINTHEDARK Remix)	Lethal Bizzle featuring Ruby Goe	2013	—N/a
Hey Mama (GLOWINTHEDARK Remix)	David Guetta featuring Nicki Minaj, Bebe Rexha, and Afrojack	2015	—N/a
Bang My Head (GLOWINTHEDARK Remix)	David Guetta featuring Sia	2015	—N/a
This One's for You (GLOWINTHEDARK Remix)	David Guetta featuring Zara Larsson	2016	—N/a
2U (GLOWINTHEDARK Remix)	David Guetta featuring Justin Bieber	2017	—N/a

=== Co-productions ===
Title	Date of release	Label	Artists
Makin’ Papers	23-07-2013	Big Beat Records	Chuckie featuring Lupe Fiasco, Too Short and Snow Tha Product
Skydive	06-12-2013	Big Beat Records	Chuckie featuring Maiday
