= The Whisperer (song) =

Song by David Guetta featuring Sia

from the album Listen
- Released: 24 November 2014
- Recorded: 2014
- Studio: Piano Music Studio (Amsterdam); Power Sound Studio (Amsterdam)
- Genre: Pop rock
- Length: 3:54
- Label: Parlophone; Atlantic
- Songwriter(s): David Guetta; Giorgio Tuinfort; Sia Furler
- Producer(s): David Guetta; Giorgio Tuinfort

"The Whisperer" is a song by French DJ and producer David Guetta, featuring the vocals of frequent collaborator, Australian singer Sia, taken from the former's sixth studio album, Listen. It was released, along with the album, on 24 November 2014. The song features Sia on vocals, and is noted as one of the standout tracks from the album, due to the absence of any synths, or electro house production, the other being "I'll Keep Loving You" that features Birdy and Jaymes Young, however that song features minimal synths. The song has charted in France.

== Composition ==
Musically, the song is written in the key of G minor. The album version of the song follows a tempo of 141 beats per minute. Sia's vocals span two octaves, from G_{3} to C_{5}.

"The Whisperer" is a melancholic ballad that emphasizes raw emotion through its stripped-down instrumentation. The song is in a slow tempo, primarily driven by a piano melody, with orchestral elements subtly enhancing the atmosphere. Lyrically, the song explores themes of self-discovery, emotional struggles, and the search for solace.

== Personnel ==
- David Guetta – production, songwriting, instrument programming
- Giorgio Tuinfort – production, songwriting, instrument programming, piano
- Sia – lead vocals, songwriting
- Franck van der Heijden – orchestrating, conductor
- Paul Power – mixing engineering
- Joris Wolff – assistant engineering
- Anne van Eck – violin
- Annemarie Hensens – violin
- Ben Mathot – violin
- Bram Faber – violin
- Carolien Roodenburg – violin
- Diewertje Wanders – violin
- Floortje Beljon – violin
- Ian De Jong – violin
- Inger van Vliet – violin
- Judith Eisenhardt – violin
- Judith van Driel – violin
- Kim White – violin
- Lotti Peverelli – violin
- Mark Mulder – violin
- Marleen Wester – violin
- Lotti Peverelli – violin
- Sofie van der Pol – violin
- Stijn Brinkman – violin
- Tseroeja van den Bos – violin
- Yanna Pelser – violin
- David Faber – cello
- Jascha Bordon – cello
- Jozien Jansen – cello
- Hanna Guirten – french horn
- Rosa De Bruin – french horn
- Hinse Mutter – bass
- Pim Boons – bass
- Ricciotti Strings – string orchestra

== Charts ==
=== Weekly charts ===
Chart (2014)	Peak position
France (SNEP)	96
