= Clap Your Hands (David Guetta and Glowinthedark song) =

Single by David Guetta and Glowinthedark

from the album Listen Again
- Released: 2 October 2015
- Recorded: 2014
- Genre: Electro house; big room house
- Length: 3:55
- Label: What a Music; Parlophone
- Songwriters: David Guetta; Giorgio Tuinfort; Martin Garrix; Thomas Leithead-Docherty; Albert Budhai
- Producers: David Guetta; Martin Garrix; Glowinthedark

David Guetta singles chronology
"Sun Goes Down" (2015)	"Clap Your Hands" (2015)	"Bang My Head" (2015)

Glowinthedark singles chronology
"Ain't a Party" (2013)	"Clap Your Hands" (2015)	"All the Way Up (EDM remix)" (2016)

"Clap Your Hands" is a song by French DJ and record producer David Guetta and Dutch electronic music duo Glowinthedark. The song was released as a digital download on 2 October 2015. The song peaked at number 166 on the French Singles Chart. The song was written by David Guetta, Giorgio Tuinfort, Martin Garrix, Thomas Leithead-Docherty and Albert Budhai, it is included on the 2015 re-release of Guetta's sixth studio album, entitled Listen Again.

== Chart performance ==
Chart performance for "Clap Your Hands"
Chart (2015)	Peak position
Belgium (Ultratip Bubbling Under Flanders)	35
Belgium Dance (Ultratop Flanders)	38
France (SNEP)	166

== Release history ==
Release history and formats for "Clap Your Hands"
Region	Date	Format	Label
France	27 November 2015	Digital download	What a Music; Parlophone
