= Ain't a Party =

Single by David Guetta and Glowinthedark featuring Harrison
- Released: 17 June 2013
- Recorded: 2013
- Genre: Big room house
- Length: 6:03
- Label: Jack Back; Parlophone
- Songwriters: Abrigael Ramos; Albert Budhai; David Guetta; Giorgio Tuinfort; Harrison Shaw; Thomas Leithead-Docherty; Jean Baptiste
- Producers: David Guetta; Giorgio Tuinfort; Glowinthedark

David Guetta singles chronology
"Right Now" (2013)	"Ain't a Party" (2013)	"Shot Me Down" (2014)

Glowinthedark singles chronology
"Ain't a Party" (2013)	"Clap Your Hands" (2015)

Harrison singles chronology
"Ain't a Party" (2013)	"Sally" (2015)

"Ain't a Party" is a song by French house music producer and disc jockey (DJ) David Guetta and Dutch duo Glowinthedark, featuring vocals from Harrison Shaw. The song was released as the lead single from Guetta's compilation album Fuck Me I'm Famous – Ibiza Mix 2013. The song was written by Harrison who originally recorded on the project in February 2013 after meeting Chuckie who had introduced him to Glowinthedark, After receiving a rough instrumental from Albert Budhai. The track went on to become a massive success at Miami's Ultra Music Festival where Guetta first heard the track and signed the record and added additional production with Giorgio Tuinfort, Jean Baptiste, Albert Budhai, Abrigael Ramos, and with additional uncredited guitar performed by Pierre-Luc Rioux.

== Track listing ==
Digital download - radio edit
No.	Title	Length
1.	"Ain't a Party" (featuring Harrison) (Radio Edit) (Explicit)	3:14

Digital download - extended
No.	Title	Length
1.	"Ain't a Party" (featuring Harrison) (Extended) (Explicit)	6:03

== Chart performance ==
=== Weekly charts ===
Chart (2013)	Peak position
France (SNEP)	72
Germany (GfK)	46
South Korea (Gaon International)	1
Switzerland (Schweizer Hitparade)	57

== Release history ==
Region	Date	Format	Label
Worldwide	June 17, 2013	Digital download	Jack Back Records
France	July 7, 2013	Digital download (Radio Edit)	Parlophone
France	July 14, 2013	Digital download (Extended)	Parlophone
