= Bang My Head =

Single by David Guetta featuring Sia and Fetty Wap

from the album Listen Again
- Released: 30 October 2015
- Length: 3:53 (album version); 3:13 (single version)
- Label: What a Music; Parlophone; Warner
- Songwriters: David Guetta; Giorgio Tuinfort; Nick Rotteveel; Marcus Van Wattum; Christian Karlsson; Sia Furler; Vincent Pontare; Magnus Lidehäll
- Producers: Guetta; Tuinfort; Nicky Romero; Marcus Van Wattum

David Guetta singles chronology
"Clap Your Hands" (2015)	"Bang My Head" (2015)	"Listen" (2016)

Sia singles chronology
"Alive" (2015)	"Bang My Head" (2015)	"Cheap Thrills" (2016)

Fetty Wap singles chronology
"Gold Slugs" (2015)	"Bang My Head" (2015)	"Promise" (2015)

"Bang My Head" is a song by French DJ and music producer David Guetta, featuring vocals from Australian singer Sia and American rapper Fetty Wap. It was released as the second single from the re-release of Guetta's sixth studio album, Listen. "Bang My Head" tallies as the album's seventh single overall. It was released via digital download on 30 October 2015. The original album version of the song only featured Sia's vocals, but the second verse was later replaced with vocals from Fetty Wap for the reworked single release.

== Composition ==
Musically, the song is written in the key of A minor. The album version of the song follows a chord progression of Am–G–F and has a tempo of 124 beats per minute. However, the single version of the song featuring American rapper Fetty Wap has a tempo of 108 beats per minute. Sia's vocals span two octaves, from G_{3} to G_{5}.

== Music video ==
The music video premiered on 6 November 2015. The video shows Guetta losing a game of poker and a woman (played by the Hungarian model Gabriella Kuti) stepping in to win it all back for him in a technicolour horse race. Neither Sia nor Fetty Wap appear in the video.

== Track listing ==
Digital download – album track

1. "Bang My Head" (featuring Sia) – 3:53

Digital download – Single

1. "Bang My Head" (featuring Sia and Fetty Wap) – 3:13

Digital download – Remixes EP

1. "Bang My Head" (featuring Sia and Fetty Wap) (Extended) – 4:44
2. "Bang My Head" (featuring Sia and Fetty Wap) (Robin Schulz Remix) – 5:53
3. "Bang My Head" (featuring Sia and Fetty Wap) (Feder Remix) – 3:58
4. "Bang My Head" (featuring Sia and Fetty Wap) (Glowinthedark Remix) – 3:48
5. "Bang My Head" (featuring Sia and Fetty Wap) (Kryder & Dave Winnel Remix) – 4:56
6. "Bang My Head" (featuring Sia and Fetty Wap) (JP Candela Remix) – 5:45
7. "Bang My Head" (featuring Sia) (Extended) – 5:26

== Charts ==
=== Weekly charts ===
Chart (2015–2016)	Peak position
Australia (ARIA)	21
Austria (Ö3 Austria Top 40)	16
Belgium (Ultratop 50 Flanders)	29
Belgium Dance (Ultratop Flanders)	1
Belgium (Ultratop 50 Wallonia)	2
Belgium Dance (Ultratop Wallonia)	9
Canada Hot 100 (Billboard)	51
Czech Republic Singles Digital (ČNS IFPI)	9
Czech Republic Airplay (ČNS IFPI)	9
Denmark (Tracklisten)	38
Finland (Suomen virallinen lista)	20
France (SNEP)	3
France Airplay (SNEP)	1
Germany (GfK)	24
Hungary (Dance Top 40)	27
Hungary (Rádiós Top 40)	22
Hungary (Single Top 40)	39
Hungary (Stream Top 40)	19
Ireland (IRMA)	25
Israel International Airplay (Media Forest)	7
Italy (FIMI)	22
Lebanon (Lebanese Top 20)	12
Mexico (Billboard Mexican Airplay)	2
Mexico Anglo (Monitor Latino)	3
Netherlands (Dutch Top 40)	26
Netherlands (Single Top 100)	19
New Zealand (Recorded Music NZ)	17
Norway (VG-lista)	14
Poland Airplay (ZPAV)	13
Scottish Singles Sales (Official Charts)	16
Slovakia Airplay (ČNS IFPI)	41
Slovakia Singles Digital (ČNS IFPI)	42
Slovenia (SloTop50)	32
Spain (Promusicae)	6
Sweden (Sverigetopplistan)	19
Switzerland (Schweizer Hitparade)	18
UK Singles (Official Charts)	18
UK Dance (Official Charts)	6
US Billboard Hot 100	76
US Hot Dance/Electronic Songs (Billboard)	5
US Dance/Mix Show Airplay (Billboard)	5
US Pop Airplay (Billboard)	29
Venezuela English (Record Report)	1

=== Year-end charts ===
Chart (2016)	Position
Belgium (Ultratop Wallonia)	29
France (SNEP)	41
Hungary (Dance Top 40)	78
Italy (FIMI)	62
Netherlands (Single Top 100)	85
Poland (ZPAV)	88
Spain (PROMUSICAE)	39
Sweden (Sverigetopplistan)	90
Switzerland (Schweizer Hitparade)	70
UK Singles (Official Charts Company)	85
US Hot Dance/Electronic Songs (Billboard)	24

== Certifications ==
Region	Certification	Certified units/sales
Belgium (BRMA)	Gold	10,000^{‡}
Denmark (IFPI Danmark)	Gold	30,000^{^}
France (SNEP)	Diamond	233,333^{‡}
Germany (BVMI)	Gold	200,000^{‡}
Italy (FIMI)	2× Platinum	100,000^{‡}
New Zealand (RMNZ)	Platinum	15,000^{*}
Poland (ZPAV)	Platinum	20,000^{‡}
Spain (Promusicae)	2× Platinum	80,000^{‡}
Sweden (GLF)	Platinum	40,000^{‡}
Switzerland (IFPI Switzerland)	Gold	15,000^{‡}
United Kingdom (BPI)	Platinum	600,000^{‡}
United States (RIAA)	Gold	500,000^{‡}
^{*} Sales figures based on certification alone.^{^} Shipments figures based on certification alone.^{‡} Sales+streaming figures based on certification alone.
