= Summer Nights (Tiësto song) =

Single by Tiësto featuring John Legend
- Released: 17 June 2016
- Recorded: 2016
- Genre: Progressive house; deep house; dance-pop
- Length: 3:10
- Label: Musical Freedom; PM:AM; Universal
- Songwriter(s): Tijs Verwest; John Ryan; Teddy Geiger; Ruth-Anne Cunningham
- Producer(s): Tiësto; Matt Ward; Sergio Popken; Dean Gillard; Chris "Tek" O'Ryan (voc.)

Tiësto singles chronology
"The Right Song" (2016)	"Summer Nights" (2016)	"On My Way" (2016)

John Legend singles chronology
"Listen" (2016)	"Summer Nights" (2016)	"Love Me Now" (2016)

Music video
- "Summer Nights" on YouTube

"Summer Nights" is a song by Dutch DJ and record producer Tiësto. The song features American singer John Legend. It was written by Tiësto, John Ryan, Ruth-Anne Cunningham and Teddy Geiger, and produced by Tiësto and additional produced by Dean Gillard, Matt Ward and Sergio Popken. Released by Musical Freedom on 17 June 2016.

== Music video ==
On 14 July 2016 Tiësto uploaded the music video for "Summer Nights" on his YouTube and Vevo account.

== Track listing ==
- Digital download
1. "Summer Nights" — 3:10
- Digital download
1. "Summer Nights" (Tiësto's Deep House Remix) — 3:12
- Digital download
1. "Summer Nights" (MOTi Remix) — 3:31
- Digital download
1. "Summer Nights" (The Him Remix) — 3:10

== Charts ==
Chart (2016–18)	Peak position
Belgium (Ultratop 50 Wallonia)	31
Ecuador (National-Report)	55
Netherlands (Single Top 100)	57
Scotland (OCC)	19
Sweden (Sverigetopplistan)	72
UK Singles (OCC)	60
UK Dance (OCC)	20
US Hot Dance/Electronic Songs (Billboard)	13

== Release history ==
Region	Date	Format	Label	Ref.
United States	17 June 2016	Digital download; streaming	Musical Freedom	
