= What I Did for Love (David Guetta song) =

2015 single by David Guetta feat Emeli Sandé

Single by David Guetta featuring Emeli Sandé

from the album Listen
- Released: 20 February 2015
- Studio: Metropolis Studios (London, England); Stadthalle Offenbach (Offenbach, Germany)
- Genre: EDM
- Length: 3:27
- Label: What a Music; Parlophone
- Songwriters: David Guetta; Giorgio Tuinfort; Breyan Isaac; Jason Evigan; Sam Martin; Sean Douglas
- Producers: David Guetta; Giorgio Tuinfort

David Guetta singles chronology
"Dangerous" (2014)	"What I Did for Love" (2015)	"Hey Mama" (2015)

Emeli Sandé singles chronology
"Free" (2013)	"What I Did for Love" (2015)	"I.O.U" (2016)

Namie Amuro singles chronology
"Brighter Day" (2014)	"What I Did for Love" (2015)	"Revolution" (2015)

"What I Did for Love" is a song by French music producer David Guetta. It was released as the third single from his sixth studio album, Listen (2014). It features vocals by Scottish recording artist Emeli Sandé. It was released officially on 20 February 2015 in the United Kingdom. The song was written by Guetta, Giorgio Tuinfort, Breyan Stanley Isaac, Jason Evigan, Sam Martin, and Sean Douglas. Japanese recording artist Namie Amuro recorded an alternate version of the song for inclusion on her album Genic and Japanese edition of Listen Again, this version was released as a promotional single on 1 July 2015.

== Promotion ==
Guetta and Sandé performed "What I Did for Love" on The X Factor UK on 22 November 2014. BBC soap opera EastEnders also used the song as part of their live episode on 20 February 2015.

== Track listing ==
Digital download
No.	Title	Length
1.	"What I Did for Love" (featuring Emeli Sandé)	3:27

Digital download – Vinai remix
No.	Title	Length
1.	"What I Did for Love" (featuring Emeli Sandé; Vinai remix)	4:38

Digital download – Remixes EP
No.	Title	Length
1.	"What I Did for Love" (featuring Emeli Sandé; Vinai remix)	4:38
2.	"What I Did for Love" (featuring Emeli Sandé; Morten remix)	5:05
3.	"What I Did for Love" (featuring Emeli Sandé; Quentin Mosimann remix)	6:00
4.	"What I Did for Love" (featuring Emeli Sandé; Teemid remix)	3:26
5.	"What I Did for Love" (featuring Emeli Sandé; Pang! remix)	5:38
6.	"What I Did for Love" (featuring Emeli Sandé; extended)	5:30

CD single
No.	Title	Length
1.	"What I Did for Love" (featuring Emeli Sandé; Vinai remix)	4:38
2.	"What I Did for Love" (featuring Emeli Sandé; Morten remix)	5:05
3.	"What I Did for Love" (featuring Emeli Sandé; Quentin Mosimann remix)	6:00
4.	"What I Did for Love" (featuring Emeli Sandé; Teemid remix)	3:26
5.	"What I Did for Love" (featuring Emeli Sandé; Pang! remix)	5:38
6.	"What I Did for Love" (featuring Emeli Sandé; extended)	5:30
7.	"What I Did for Love" (featuring Emeli Sandé; radio edit)	3:13

== Charts ==
=== Weekly charts ===
2014–2015 weekly chart performance
Chart (2014–2015)	Peak position
Australia (ARIA)	20
Austria (Ö3 Austria Top 40)	10
Belgium (Ultratop 50 Flanders)	24
Belgium (Ultratop 50 Wallonia)	35
France (SNEP)	30
Germany (GfK)	16
Hungary (Dance Top 40)	11
Hungary (Rádiós Top 40)	4
Hungary (Single Top 40)	12
Ireland (IRMA)	12
Israel International Airplay (Media Forest)	1
Italy (FIMI)	37
Lebanon (Lebanese Top 20)	8
Netherlands (Dutch Top 40)	34
Netherlands (Single Top 100)	56
Romania (Airplay 100)	46
Scotland Singles (OCC)	4
Slovenia Airplay (SloTop50)	14
Spain (Promusicae)	31
Sweden (Sverigetopplistan)	58
Switzerland (Schweizer Hitparade)	37
UK Singles (OCC)	6
UK Dance (OCC)	1

2026 weekly chart performance
Chart (2026)	Peak position
South Africa Airplay (TOSAC)	1

=== Year-end charts ===
Chart (2015)	Position
France (SNEP)	171
Germany (Official German Charts)	83
Hungary (Dance Top 40)	37
Hungary (Rádiós Top 40)	41
Hungary (Single Top 40)	90
Slovenia (SloTop50)	45
UK Singles (OCC)	66

== Certifications ==
Region	Certification	Certified units/sales
Australia (ARIA)	Gold	35,000^{^}
Germany (BVMI)	Gold	200,000^{‡}
Italy (FIMI)	Gold	25,000^{‡}
Sweden (GLF)	Gold	20,000^{‡}
United Kingdom (BPI)	Platinum	600,000^{‡}
^{^} Shipments figures based on certification alone.^{‡} Sales+streaming figures based on certification alone.

== Release history ==
Region	Date	Format	Label
United Kingdom	22 November 2014	Digital download	What a Music; Parlophone
Worldwide	19 January 2015	Digital download — VINAI remix	What a Music; Parlophone
France	2 February 2015	Digital download — Remixes EP	What a Music; Parlophone
Germany	20 February 2015	Digital download — Remixes EP	What a Music; Parlophone
United Kingdom	21 February 2015	Digital download — Remixes EP	What a Music; Parlophone
Germany	20 February 2015	CD single	What a Music; Parlophone
