= I'm Ready (AJR song) =

2012–2013 single by AJR

Single by AJR

from the EP 6foot1 and the album Living Room
- Released: November 13, 2012 (original) August 22, 2013 (reissue)
- Recorded: 2012
- Studio: Harmony Hall, Columbia University
- Genre: Electropop; teen pop
- Length: 3:47
- Label: AJR Productions; Warner Bros.
- Songwriters: Ryan Met; Jack Met; Adam Met
- Producer: AJR

AJR singles chronology
"I'm Ready" (2012)	"Woody Allen" (2014)

Music video
- "I'm Ready" on YouTube

"I'm Ready" is the debut single by American indie pop band AJR. It was independently released on November 13, 2012, by AJR Productions, and reissued as a single on August 22, 2013, with Warner Bros. Records. The song samples SpongeBob SquarePants shouting his catchphrase, "I'm ready!" The song is included on their debut EP, 6foot1, and their debut album, Living Room.

The song charted best internationally in Australia, where it peaked at number five and was certified multi-platinum. It reached number 65 on the Billboard Hot 100 in 2014, and was certified platinum in 2015.

== Music and production ==
The song employs a notable sample of SpongeBob SquarePants saying "I'm ready!" from the eponymous animated television series' premiere episode "Help Wanted". AJR explained that the inspiration for the song came when the band members were "talking one day and joked that David Guetta or Skrillex would sample SpongeBob kinda in like, an ironic way. Then Ryan said 'let's not give it away to them, why don't we do it!'"

== Usage in media ==
The song played in the trailer and TV spot for the 2015 film Trainwreck.

The song played in the trailer for the 2021 reboot of Rugrats.

"I'm Ready" is also often associated with YouTuber and Sidemen member Tobit "Tobi" Brown (known online as TBJZL or Tobjizzle) who used the chorus of the song in his introduction to his YouTube videos from 2013 to 2019. On October 14, 2019, Brown announced that he could no longer use the song in his intro after Warner Music Group (AJR's record label) started copyright claiming his YouTube videos, despite being whitelisted by the band and having their permission to use the song.

== Charts ==
=== Weekly charts ===
Weekly chart performance for "I'm Ready"
Chart (2013–2014)	Peak position
Australia (ARIA)	5
Australia Digital Song Sales (Billboard)	4
US Billboard Hot 100	65
US Pop Airplay (Billboard)	27

=== Year-end charts ===
Year-end chart performance for "I'm Ready"
Chart (2014)	Peak position
Australia (ARIA)	46

== Certifications ==
Region	Certification	Certified units/sales
Australia (ARIA)	3× Platinum	210,000^{‡}
New Zealand (RMNZ)	Gold	15,000^{‡}
United States (RIAA)	Platinum	1,000,000^{‡}
^{‡} Sales+streaming figures based on certification alone.

== Release history ==
Region	Date	Format	Label	Ref.
United States	November 13, 2012	Digital download	AJR Productions	
United States	August 22, 2013	Digital download; single release	AJR; Warner Bros.	
United States	December 20, 2013	Digital download (EP)	AJR; Warner Bros.	
United States	April 8, 2014	Top 40 radio	Warner Bros.	

== See also ==
- List of top 10 singles for 2014 in Australia
