= Listen (David Guetta song) =

Single by David Guetta featuring John Legend

from the album Listen
- Released: 4 March 2016
- Recorded: 2014
- Length: 3:47 (album version)
- Label: Parlophone
- Songwriters: David Guetta; Giorgio Tuinfort; Austin Bisnow; Frédéric Riesterer; Jason Evigan; John Stephens; Sarah Rayne; Joaquin Howard Banuelos
- Producers: David Guetta; Giorgio Tuinfort; Austin Bis

David Guetta singles chronology
"Bang My Head" (2015)	"Listen" (2016)	"No Worries" (2016)

John Legend singles chronology
"Like I'm Gonna Lose You" (2015)	"Listen" (2016)	"Summer Nights" (2016)

"Listen" is a song by French DJ and music producer David Guetta, featuring vocals from American singer John Legend, from the album of the same name.

== Charts ==
Weekly chart performance for "Listen"
Chart (2014–2016)	Peak position
France (SNEP)	82
Germany (GfK)	85
Italy (FIMI)	74

== Certifications ==
Region	Certification	Certified units/sales
Italy (FIMI)	Gold	25,000^{‡}
^{‡} Sales+streaming figures based on certification alone.

== Release history ==
Region	Date	Format	Label
Italy	4 March 2016	Mainstream radio	Warner Music
