= Harrison (English musician) =

- Born: Harrison Manley-Shaw; 1992 or 1993 (age 33–34); England
- Origin: Norwich, England
- Genres: EDM; electronic; dance-pop
- Occupations: Music producer; singer; songwriter
- Years active: 2013–present

Harrison Manley-Shaw (born 1993) professionally known as Harrison, is an English music producer, singer, and songwriter. He entered the electronic dance music scene in 2013 as the featured vocalist on David Guetta's track "Ain't a Party". After collaborating with DJs such as Hardwell and Steve Aoki, Harrison began a solo career in 2016. In late 2025, his cover of t.A.T.u.'s "All the Things She Said" appeared in the television series Heated Rivalry.

== Early life and education ==
Harrison was born 1992 or 1993 and raised in the United Kingdom and grew up in Norwich. His early musical influences included rap, specifically Eminem, as well as Sting, Phil Collins, and the UK garage scene. He has cited Eminem and Noel Gallagher as specific influences. Harrison became interested in rave music at the age of 16 or 17. He developed production skills in London, observing artists such as Mary J. Blige and Sting in the studio. In 2025, he left the Hellesdon area of Norwich.

== Career ==
Harrison's career began in 2013 with vocals for David Guetta's "Ain't a Party". Harrison had met the Dutch duo Glowinthedark at a Dirty Dutch event in Amsterdam and shared his demo with them, which led to the release with Guetta. He subsequently worked with Steve Aoki, Laidback Luke, and the Italian duo Vinai. In 2015, he collaborated with Dutch producer Hardwell on the single "Sally".

Harrison began a solo career in 2016 and debuted the "Harrison show" in Japan that year. His first official release as a primary artist, "L.A. Girls," came out on 22 April 2016. He premiered the track live with Juicy M at the H20 Festival in South Africa. A collaboration with producer Kill the Buzz followed on 23 May 2016. Harrison toured internationally during this time, with performances in Asia and South Africa. His 2016 tour of India included shows at KittySu in Mumbai and the National Institute of Technology Calicut. By 2026, he had been active as a music producer for 13 years.

In 2022, Harrison produced a dance cover of the 2002 t.A.T.u. song "All the Things She Said". The track appeared in the episode "Rose" of the Canadian sports romance drama Heated Rivalry in December 2025. Used during a club scene, Harrison described the track as an "informal theme song" for the series. Between 12 and 15 December 2025, streams of the cover increased by 114,000 percent, and the song reached the top 10 on iTunes and the top 15 on Shazam in the United States. By January 2026, the track topped Spotify's Viral 50 daily playlist in the U.S., achieving 500,000 streams on a single day. Jennifer Lopez shared the song in an Instagram post to her 246 million followers. Following this resurgence, Harrison announced plans for a new record deal and tour.

== Musical style ==
Harrison is a "hybrid" artist who contributes both vocals and production. He incorporates rock influences into electronic music, noting that his tracks often begin as rock or pop songs on the guitar. He aims to add a "rock-y touch" to his vocals. His work spans genres from the rock-influenced "Sally" to the indie and dream pop style of "Man on the Moon". He has worked as a ghost producer.

== Discography ==
=== Singles ===
Title	Year	Peak chart positions								Album
Title	Year	AUT	CAN	FRA	GER	NL	SWI	UK Down.	US Dance	Album
"Ain't a Party" (with David Guetta and Glowinthedark)	2013	—	—	72	46	—	57	—	—	Fuck Me I'm Famous – Ibiza Mix 2013
"Sally" (with Hardwell)	2015	33	—	—	60	56	—	—	—	United We Are
"The Wave" (with Vinai)	2015	—	—	—	—	—	—	—	—	Non-album singles
"All the Things She Said"	2022	—	44	—	—	—	—	51	5	Non-album singles
"—" denotes a recording that did not chart or was not released in that territory.
