= Living Room (AJR album) =

Studio album by AJR
- Released: March 3, 2015
- Recorded: 2012–2014
- Length: 46:02
- Labels: AJR Productions; Warner Bros. Records
- Producer: Ryan Met

AJR chronology
Infinity (2014)	Living Room (2015)	What Everyone's Thinking (2016)

Singles from Living Room
- 1. "I'm Ready" Released: August 22, 2013; 2. "Infinity" Released: September 11, 2014

Living Room is the debut studio album by American pop band AJR. It was released through the band's label AJR Productions and Warner Music Group on March 3, 2015.

== Background ==
AJR began busking in various parks of New York City on July 9, 2005, performing as tap dancers under the name lit. 'TB³' or 'Tapping Brothers to the Third Power'. Through donations made from passerby, the group was able to afford instruments, microphones, and a computer, transitioning into performing music. The brothers began referring to their band as Adam, Jack and Ryan, taking inspiration from Peter, Paul and Mary, before shortening it to AJR. They initially performed covers, later writing original songs. These were included on their independently released albums Born and Bred (2010) and Venture (2010).

== Promotion ==
In 2012, AJR released the self-titled EP "AJR", featuring the song "The World Is a Marble Heart" alongside three other tracks. This was followed by the band's major-label debut EP, 6foot1, on December 20, 2013. It featured the band's breakout single "I'm Ready", which helped the band secure a record deal with Warner Music Group. The band's second EP, Infinity, was released on September 23, 2014, with its sole single "Infinity" being the second single for Living Room. The album was initially planned for release on September 30, 2014, featuring an alternate tracklist. but was ultimately delayed to improve the production of certain songs, and to re-do the tracklist. The final album eventually came out on March 3, 2015.

== Track listing ==
All tracks are written by Jack and Ryan Met, except where noted.

No.	Title	Writer(s)	Length
1.	"Overture"		2:38
2.	"Infinity"		4:00
3.	"I'm Ready"	Jack Met	3:47
4.	"My Calling"		3:38
5.	"Thirsty"		3:02
6.	"Pitchfork Kids"		3:33
7.	"Woody Allen"		3:45
8.	"Livin' on Love"		3:42
9.	"Big White Bed"		2:43
10.	"The World Is a Marble Heart"		3:10
11.	"The Green and the Town"		5:06
12.	"Big Idea"		3:21
13.	"Growing Old on Bleecker Street"		3:23
Total length:			46:02

== Personnel ==
Credits adapted from the album's liner notes.

AJR

- Adam Met – bass guitar, co-lead vocals
- Jack Met – lead vocals, instruments
- Ryan Met – lead vocals, production, arrangement, mixing

Technical

- Chris Gehringer – mastering engineer
- Adam Herzog – artists and repertoire
- Jeff Sosnow – artists and repertoire
- Steve Greenberg – artists and repertoire
- Shervin Lainez – photography
- Roy Wiemann – front cover image manipulation

== Charts ==
Weekly chart performance for Living Room
Chart (2015)	Peak position
US Heatseekers Albums (Billboard)	20
