= Sam Martin (singer) =

American singer-songwriter (born 1983)

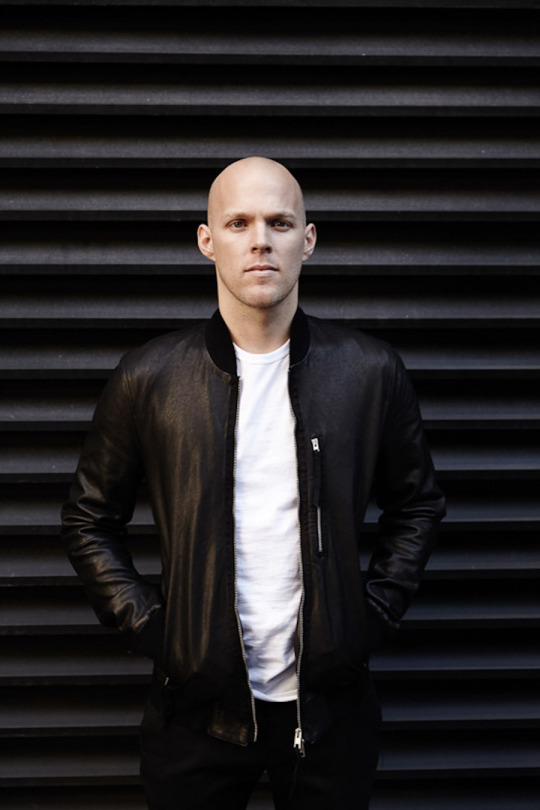

Background information
- Born: Samuel Denison Martin; February 7, 1983 (age 43); New York City, New York, U.S.
- Origin: Lake Oswego, Oregon, U.S.
- Genres: Pop; dance; pop rock; hip hop; reggae
- Occupations: Musician; singer; songwriter; record producer
- Years active: 2012–present
- Labels: Atlantic; APG
- Formerly of: Con Bro Chill

Samuel Denison Martin (born February 7, 1983) is an American musician, singer, songwriter and record producer. His song "Want to Want Me" (released by Jason Derulo) holds the record for the most adds in American contemporary hit radio history.

Following signing to Artist Publishing Group, Martin's first song he wrote for another artist became the song "Daylight" by Maroon 5, which peaked at number one on the Billboard charts. His writing on the album Fly Rasta, released by Ziggy Marley, led it to becoming a number-one reggae album as well as a receiving a Grammy Award.

Martin rose to the public eye in 2014 for not only writing but being a featured artist on David Guetta's number-one singles "Lovers on the Sun" and "Dangerous". His work extends to projects with One Direction, Nick Jonas, Zedd, Flo Rida, Prince Royce, The Chainsmokers, Pitbull, Jon Bellion, Snoop Dogg, T.I., Julia Michaels, Armin van Buuren and G-Eazy. Sam Martin also has a side project called Con Bro Chill who have released singles including "We Should Hang Out".

== Career ==
=== Early beginnings ===
Martin was born in New York City and raised in Lake Oswego, Oregon. He attended Lakeridge High School and went to Berklee College of Music for two years.

=== 2012–14: Breakthrough ===
Martin's breakthrough came with the writing and release of "Daylight" by Maroon 5. In 2014 Martin was the contributing singer and co-writer on the song "Lovers on the Sun" and "Dangerous" by David Guetta Martin also collaborated with Ziggy Marley on the song "Lighthouse" from his album Fly Rasta. In 2015, Fly Rasta won the grammy for best Reggae Album.

== Discography ==
=== Singles ===
==== As lead artist ====
"Rather Be Alone" (with Robin Schulz and Nick Martin) Released September 2019

"Sabotage" Released January 2019

"Sugar Is Sweet" Released February 2019

"Long Live The Billionaire" Released March 2018

Blue Tuesday (EP)

- "It Was Always You" Released December 2018
- "All My Tears" Released December 2018
- "I Still Haven't Found What I'm Looking For" Released December 2018
- "A Day In The Life" Released December 2018
- "Happy Christmas (War Is Over)" Released December 2018

"Bring Me Home" Released June 2017

"It's Gonna Get Better" Released October 2017

"Song For My Unborn Son" Released January 2015

==== As featured artist ====
Single	Year	Peak chart positions											Certifications	Album
Single	Year	US	AUS	AUT	FRA	GER	IRE	NLD	NOR	SWE	SWI	UK	Certifications	Album
"All These Roads" (Sultan + Ned Shepard featuring Sam Martin and Zella Day)	2013													
"Lovers on the Sun" (David Guetta featuring Sam Martin)	2014	121	2	1	5	1	3	9	4	4	2	1	ARIA: Platinum; BPI: Platinum; BVMI: Platinum; FIMI: 2× Platinum; GLF: 3× Platinum; IFPI SWI: Platinum	Listen
"Unbreakable" (Dirty South featuring Sam Martin)	2014													With You
"Dangerous" (David Guetta featuring Sam Martin)	2014	56	7	1	1	1	7	2	1	5	1	5	ARIA: Platinum; BPI: Platinum; BVMI: 3× Gold; FIMI: 2× Platinum; IFPI AUT: Gold; IFPI SWI: Platinum; MC: Platinum; RMNZ: Gold	Listen
"Dirty Mind" (Flo Rida featuring Sam Martin)	2015	—	—	—	—	—	—	—	—	—	—	—		TBA
"Carry Me Home" (Sam Feldt featuring Sam Martin)	2017													Sunset
"Naked" (Robin Schulz featuring Sam Martin)	2017													Uncovered
"Leviathan" (G-Eazy featuring Sam Martin)	2017													The Beautiful & Damned
"Nothing Scares Me Anymore" (Steve Angello featuring Sam Martin)	2018	—	—	—	—	—	—	—	—	—	—	—		HUMAN
"Wild Wild Son" (Armin van Buuren featuring Sam Martin)	2018	—	—	—	—	—	—	41	—	—	—	—	NVPI : Gold	Balance
"I Want a Miracle" (Fred Rister featuring Sam Martin and Chris Willis)	2018	—	—	—	—	—	—	—	—	—	—	—		Non-album singles
"Love You Forever" (Nicky Romero and Stadiumx featuring Sam Martin)	2019	—	—	—	—	—	—	—	—	—	—	—		Non-album singles
"Be Mine" (Stadiumx featuring Sam Martin)	2020	—	—	—	—	—	—	—	—	—	—		—	Non-album singles
"—" denotes a single that did not chart or was not released in that territory.

== Songwriting credits ==
Year	Artist	Song	Album
2010	Florrie	"Call of the Wild"	Introduction EP
2011	Florrie	"Experimenting with Rugs"	Experiments EP
2012	Florrie	"Every Inch"	Late EP
2012	Florrie	"I Wanna Get You Back"	Late EP
2012	Maroon 5	"Daylight"	Overexposed
2013	Sultan & Shepard	"All These Roads" feat. Sam Martin and Zella Day	Non-album single
2013	Guy Sebastian	"Like a Drum"	Madness
2013	Union J	"Last Goodbye"	Union J
2014	David Guetta	"Lovers on the Sun" feat. Sam Martin	Listen
2014	Maroon 5	"It Was Always You"	V
2014	Dirty South	"Unbreakable" feat. Sam Martin	With You
2014	Maroon 5	"Coming Back for You"	V
2014	David Guetta	"Dangerous" feat. Sam Martin	Listen
2014	Nick Jonas	"Wilderness"	Nick Jonas
2014	One Direction	"Change Your Ticket"	Four
2014	Prince Royce	"Stuck on a Feeling" feat. Snoop Dogg	Double Vision
2014	David Guetta	"What I Did for Love" feat. Emeli Sande	Listen
2014	David Guetta	"Goodbye Friend" feat. The Script	Listen
2015	Rozzi	"Psycho"	Space EP
2015	Florrie	"Too Young to Remember"	Non-album single
2015	Jason Derulo	"Want to Want Me"	Everything is 4
2015	Zedd	"Straight into the Fire"	True Colors
2015	Zedd	"Papercut" feat. Troye Sivan	True Colors
2015	Jason Derulo	"Cheyenne"	Everything is 4
2015	Robert DeLong	"Don't Wait Up"	In the Cards
2015	Hey Violet	"Can't Take Back the Bullet"	I Can Feel It EP
2015	Nick Jonas	"Levels"	Nick Jonas x2
2015	Nick Jonas	"Area Code"	Nick Jonas x2
2015	Flo Rida	"Dirty Mind" feat. Sam Martin	Non-album single
2015	Olly Murs	"Stevie Knows"	Never Been Better: Special Edition
2016	Dreamers	"Come Down Slow"	This Album Does Not Exist
2016	Digitalism	"Destination Breakdown"	Mirage
2016	Jon Bellion	"Morning in America"	The Human Condition
2016	Papa Ya	"Outta Here" feat. Con Bro Chill	Non-album single
2016	Jason Derulo	"Kiss the Sky"	Platinum Hits
2016	Dreamers	"Lucky Dog"	This Album Does Not Exist
2016	Papa Ya	"Sunny"	Non-album single
2017	Lecrae	"River of Jordan" feat. Breyan Isaac	The Shack OST
2017	Pitbull	"Options" feat. Stephen Marley	Climate Change
2017	The Chainsmokers	"It Won't Kill Ya" feat. Louane	Memories... Do Not Open
2017	Vice	"Obsession" feat. Jon Bellion	Non-album single
2017	Sam Feldt	"Yes" feat. Akon	Sunrise
2017	LNDWHL	"Xans in Her Lean"	Non-album single
2017	Galantis	"Call Me Home"	The Aviary
2017	Half the Animal	"Bad Bad Love"	Non-album single
2017	Robin Schulz	"Naked" feat. Sam Martin	Uncovered
2017	Rachel Platten	"Fooling You"	Waves
2017	Marcus & Martinus	"Please Don't Go"	Moments
2017	Sam Feldt	"Carry Me Home" feat. Sam Martin	Sunrise to Sunset
2017	Inna	"My Dreams"	Nirvana
2017	G-Eazy	"Leviathan" feat. Sam Martin	The Beautiful & Damned
2018	Frédéric Riesterer	"I Want a Miracle" feat. Chris Willis and Sam Martin	Non-album single
2018	Steve Angello	"Nothing Scares Me Anymore" feat. Sam Martin	Human
2018	Kryder	"Billionaire" feat. Sam Martin	Non-album single
2018	Armin van Buuren	"Wild Wild Son" feat. Sam Martin	Balance
2019	Papa Ya	"Yesterday"	Non-album single
2019	Sam Feldt	"Lose My Colors" feat. Sam Martin	Magnets EP
2019	Half the Animal	"Summertime High"	Summertime High EP
2019	Austin Mahone	"Dancing with Nobody"	TBA
2019	Nicky Romero	"Love You Forever" with StadiumX feat. Sam Martin	Non-album single
2019	Paige Cavell	"Figure it Out"	Figure It Out EP
2019	Illenium	"In Your Arms" with X Ambassadors	Ascend
2019	Ava Max	"Torn"	Non-album single
2019	Robin Schulz	"Rather Be Alone" with Nick Martin and Sam Martin	IIII
2019	NOTD	"Wanted" with Daya	Non-album single
2019	SuperM	"I Can't Stand the Rain" feat. Kenzie and Lee Soo-man	SuperM EP
2019	Armin van Buuren	"Miles Away" feat. Sam Martin	Balance
2019	Captain Cuts	"Heat" feat. Parson James	Non-album single
2020	Changmin	"Chocolate"	Chocolate EP
2024	Illit	"Tick-Tack"	I'll Like You
2025	Ava Max	"Take My Call"	Don't Click Play
2026	Ava Max	"Kill It Queen"	TBA
