= Dangerous (David Guetta song) =

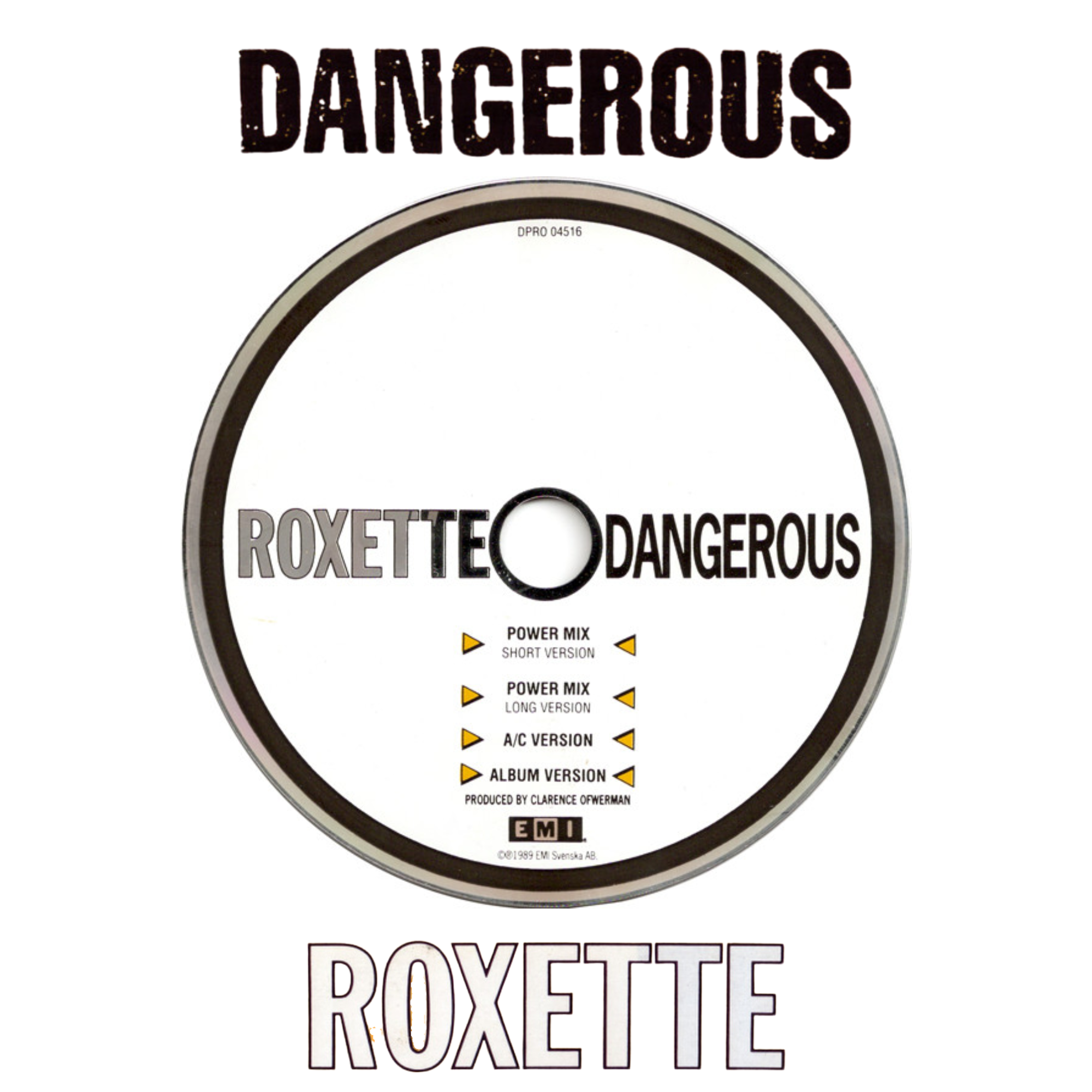

Single by David Guetta featuring Sam Martin

from the album Listen
- Released: 6 October 2014
- Recorded: 2014
- Genre: Synth-pop
- Length: 3:23 (radio edit); 6:07 (Banging remix)
- Label: What a Music; Parlophone
- Songwriters: David Guetta; Giorgio Tuinfort; Sam Martin; Jason Evigan; Lindy Robbins
- Producers: David Guetta; Giorgio Tuinfort; Sam Martin; Jason Evigan

David Guetta singles chronology
"Lovers on the Sun" (2014)	"Dangerous" (2014)	"What I Did for Love" (2015)

Sam Martin singles chronology
"Lovers on the Sun" (2014)	"Dangerous" (2014)	"Dirty Mind" (2015)

Alternative cover
- Remix version cover

Music video
- "Dangerous" (radio edit) on YouTube

"Dangerous" is a song by French music producer David Guetta released as the second single from his sixth studio album, Listen. It features vocals by American singer and songwriter Sam Martin, who had also appeared on Guetta's previous single "Lovers on the Sun". It was released as a digital download on 6 October 2014 and reached number one in fourteen countries. Both artists co-wrote and co-produced the song with Giorgio Tuinfort and Jason Evigan, with additional writing from Lindy Robbins. A remix featuring Trey Songz, Chris Brown, and Martin was released on 9 January 2015.

== Composition ==
The song is written in the key of E minor with the main chord progression of Em—C—Am—D. This song bears similarity to the Akon's song "Ghetto" by the chorus melody. The song contains major samples of Nicolo Paganini's Capriccio in Si minore per violino solo, Op. 1 No. 2.

== Music video ==
A lyric video was released on YouTube on David Guetta's channel. An extended director's cut of the music video was released on October 31. A shorter radio edit version was released on January 21, 2015. It was directed by Jonas Akerlund. The Formula 1-themed video co-starred actor James Purefoy as the rival driver. 2012 Lotus E20 Formula One cars are featured in the video, and then Lotus driver Romain Grosjean makes a cameo appearance, arriving towards the end of the video standing on the podium with Guetta and Purefoy. The video was filmed at Circuito de Jerez in Jerez de la Frontera, Andalusia, Spain.

== Remix ==
A remix version featuring Trey Songz, Chris Brown, and Sam Martin was premiered on 26 November 2014. David Guetta released it on his SoundCloud account on 10 December 2014. The song was released on iTunes Store in the US on 9 January 2015.

== Formats and track listings ==
Digital download
No.	Title	Length
1.	"Dangerous" (featuring Sam Martin)	3:23

Digital download – David Guetta remix
No.	Title	Length
1.	"Dangerous" (featuring Sam Martin) (David Guetta Banging remix)	6:07

Digital download – Robin Schulz remix
No.	Title	Length
1.	"Dangerous" (featuring Sam Martin) (Robin Schulz remix)	5:06

Digital download – Remixes EP
No.	Title	Length
1.	"Dangerous" (Robin Schulz remix)	5:06
2.	"Dangerous" (David Guetta Banging remix)	6:07
3.	"Dangerous" (Steve Aoki remix)	4:37
4.	"Dangerous" (Higher Self Remix)	4:30
5.	"Dangerous" (Kevin and Dantiez Saunderson Deep Detroit dub)	6:19
6.	"Dangerous" (Kevin Saunderson Inner City remix)	6:27

Digital download – extended version
No.	Title	Length
1.	"Dangerous" (featuring Sam Martin) (extended)	4:03

Digital download – part II
No.	Title	Length
1.	"Dangerous" (featuring Trey Songz, Chris Brown and Sam Martin) (part II)	3:33

CD single
No.	Title	Length
1.	"Dangerous" (featuring Sam Martin)	3:23
2.	"Dangerous" (featuring Sam Martin) (David Guetta Banging remix)	6:07

== Charts ==
=== Weekly charts ===
Weekly chart performance for "Dangerous"
Chart (2014–2015)	Peak position
Australia (ARIA)	7
Australia Dance (ARIA)	1
Austria (Ö3 Austria Top 40)	1
Belgium (Ultratop 50 Flanders)	4
Belgium (Ultratop 50 Wallonia)	1
Bulgaria (BAMP)	2
Canada Hot 100 (Billboard)	18
Canada CHR/Top 40 (Billboard)	20
Canada Hot AC (Billboard)	23
Czech Republic Airplay (ČNS IFPI)	6
Czech Republic Singles Digital (ČNS IFPI)	4
Denmark (Tracklisten)	6
Euro Digital Song Sales (Billboard)	1
Finland (Suomen virallinen lista)	1
France (SNEP)	1
Germany (GfK)	1
Greece Digital Songs (Billboard)	1
Hungary (Dance Top 40)	2
Hungary (Single Top 40)	3
Hungary (Stream Top 40)	1
Ireland (IRMA)	7
Israel International Airplay (Media Forest)	1
Italy (FIMI)	4
Japan Hot 100 (Billboard)	79
Lebanon (The Official Lebanese Top 20)	1
Luxembourg Digital Song Sales (Billboard)	1
Mexico Anglo (Monitor Latino)	4
Netherlands (Dutch Top 40)	2
Netherlands (Single Top 100)	3
New Zealand (Recorded Music NZ)	26
Norway (VG-lista)	1
Poland Airplay (ZPAV)	1
Poland Dance (ZPAV)	5
Portugal Digital Song Sales (Billboard)	2
Romania Airplay (Media Forest)	7
Russia Airplay (TopHit)	1
Scotland Singles (OCC)	4
Slovakia Airplay (ČNS IFPI)	10
Slovakia Singles Digital (ČNS IFPI)	1
South Africa (EMA)	8
South Korea International Chart (GAON)	35
Spain (Promusicae)	1
Sweden (Sverigetopplistan)	5
Switzerland (Schweizer Hitparade)	1
UK Singles (OCC)	5
UK Dance (OCC)	2
Ukraine Airplay (TopHit)	3
US Billboard Hot 100	56
US Hot Dance/Electronic Songs (Billboard)	6
US Dance Club Songs (Billboard)	15
US Pop Airplay (Billboard)	23

=== Year-end charts ===
2014 year-end chart performance for "Dangerous"
Chart (2014)	Position
Australia (ARIA)	81
Austria (Ö3 Austria Top 40)	51
Belgium (Ultratop Flanders)	92
Belgium (Ultratop Wallonia)	55
France (SNEP)	18
Germany (Official German Charts)	26
Hungary (Dance Top 40)	56
Hungary (Single Top 40)	38
Israel (Media Forest)	20
Italy (FIMI)	40
Netherlands (Dutch Top 40)	53
Netherlands (Single Top 100)	54
Russia Airplay (TopHit)	100
Spain (PROMUSICAE)	32
Sweden (Sverigetopplistan)	78
Switzerland (Schweizer Hitparade)	44
Ukraine Airplay (TopHit)	100
US Hot Dance/Electronic Songs (Billboard)	39

2015 year-end chart performance for "Dangerous"
Chart (2015)	Position
Belgium (Ultratop Flanders)	99
Belgium (Ultratop Wallonia)	37
CIS (TopHit)	4
France (SNEP)	37
Germany (Official German Charts)	67
Hungary (Dance Top 40)	21
Hungary (Single Top 40)	49
Italy (FIMI)	63
Netherlands (Dutch Top 40)	38
Netherlands (Single Top 100)	62
Russia Airplay (TopHit)	3
Spain (PROMUSICAE)	36
Switzerland (Schweizer Hitparade)	42
Ukraine Airplay (TopHit)	14
US Hot Dance/Electronic Songs (Billboard)	16

=== Decade-end charts ===
2010s decade-end chart performance for "Dangerous"
Chart (2010–2019)	Position
Ukrainian Airplay (TopHit)	191

== Certifications ==
Certifications for "Dangerous"
Region	Certification	Certified units/sales
Australia (ARIA)	Platinum	70,000^{^}
Austria (IFPI Austria)	Gold	15,000^{*}
Belgium (BRMA)	Gold	15,000^{*}
Canada (Music Canada)	Platinum	80,000^{*}
Denmark (IFPI Danmark)	Platinum	60,000^{^}
Germany (BVMI)	3× Gold	600,000^{‡}
Italy (FIMI)	3× Platinum	150,000^{‡}
New Zealand (RMNZ)	Platinum	15,000^{*}
Spain (Promusicae)	2× Platinum	80,000^{‡}
Sweden (GLF)	3× Platinum	120,000^{‡}
Switzerland (IFPI Switzerland)	Platinum	30,000^{‡}
United Kingdom (BPI)	Platinum	600,000^{‡}
United States (RIAA)	Platinum	1,000,000^{‡}
Streaming
Spain (Promusicae)	Gold	4,000,000^{†}
^{*} Sales figures based on certification alone.^{^} Shipments figures based on certification alone.^{‡} Sales+streaming figures based on certification alone.^{†} Streaming-only figures based on certification alone.

== Release history ==
Release dates and formats for "Dangerous"
Region	Date	Format	Label(s)	Ref.
United States	7 October 2014	Mainstream airplay	Atlantic	
