= Stadiumx =

Hungarian DJ and producer

- Origin: Hungary
- Genres: Progressive house, electro house, future house
- Occupations: DJs, record producers
- Years active: 2013–present
- Labels: Protocol Recordings, Future House Music, Armada Music, TurnItUp Muzik, OneLove, Spinnin' Records, Hexagon, Sub Religion
- Members: Dávid Nagy (Dave Martin); Zsolt Milichovszki (Sully)
- Website: stadiumxofficial.com

Stadiumx is a Hungarian progressive and future house DJ and production duo, comprising Dave (Dávid Nagy) and Sully (Zsolt Milichovszki).

== Career ==
The duo initially met at a producer workshop in Budapest (2009). Sully was already in Muzzaik for more than a decade and quite well known with 'Closer' (Spinnin' Deep), Fat Patchy (Toolroom Records) and "Let's Go", a Muzzaik and Dave Martin release. Stadiumx became famous with their international hit single "Howl at the Moon" featuring Taylr Renee released on Protocol Recordings (platinum record). The track was debuted when Nicky Romero presented it at "Nicky Romero & Friends Protocol Recordings ADE Label Night". They have also remixed the track "All These Roads" from Sultan and Ned Shepard featuring Zella Day and Sam Martin, "Lovers On The Sun" by David Guetta featuring Sam Martin, "Surrender" by Cash Cash and Gareth Emery - Eye Of The Storm. Stadiumx has a monthly podcast, called the 'X-Hour'.

== Discography ==
=== Singles ===
2023

- Heaven* - with Sam Martin & Azahriah

2022

- Out of My Mind (with Shells) [Sub Religion / Hexagon]

2021

- 7 Days (with Teamworx) [Protocol Recordings]
- Piece of My Mind (with Maone and Lukas Max) [Sub Religion / Hexagon]
- Remember (with Timmo Hendrinks featuring Robbie Rosen) [Protocol Recordings]

2020

- Sweet Calling (with Røyal) [Future House Music]
- Free Spirit [Heartfeldt Records]
- Illusions (featuring Lena Leon) [Future House Music]
- Losing My Mind [Sub Religion Records]
- Be Yourself [Sub Religion Records]
- Be Mine (with Sam Martin) [Sub Religion Records]
- Sweet Harmony (with Lux) [Hexagon]

2019

- We Are Life (with Sebastian Wibe featuring Mingue) [Future House Music]
- Where Are You Now [Protocol Recordings]
- Touch My Soul [Hysteria Records]
- Getting Late (featuring Bishøp) [Generation Hex]
- Love You Forever (with Nicky Romero featuring Sam Martin) [Protocol Recordings]
- Overload (with Mingue) [Enhanced Music]

2018

- Want You [Sprs]
- Rise (with Nicky Romero featuring Matluck) [Protocol Recordings]
- Do It Again (with Metrush featuring BISHØP) [Hexagon]
- Legend [Doorn]
- Thinking Of You [Sprs]
- Dangerous Vibes (with Going Deeper and MC Flipside) [Protocol Recordings]

2017

- It's Not Right But It's Okay [Hexagon]
- Spacebird (with Metrush) [Future House Music]
- Those Were The Days (featuring Marc Scibilia) [BMG Rights Management GmbH]
- The Fall (featuring Bishop) [Hexagon]
- Last Night A D.J. Saved My Life (with Muzzaik) [Sprs]
- I Feel It All (with Dzasko) [Protocol Recordings]

2016

- MASS (with Metrush) [Moon Records]
- Deeper (with Syskey) [Big Beat Records]
- Another Life - Official Balaton Sound 2016 Anthem (with Baha and Markquis featuring Delaney Jane) [Armada Zouk]
- So Much Love (with Muzzaik) [Sprs]
- Mombasa [TurnItUp Muzik]

2015

- Harmony (with Nicky Romero) [Protocol Recordings]
- Glare (with Metrush) [TurnItUp Muzik]
- Time Is On Your Side (with Dzasko featuring Delaney Jane) [Armada Music]
- Wonderland (featuring Angelika Vee) [TurnItUp Muzik]

2014

- Tom Swoon and Stadiumx featuring Rico & Miella - Ghost [Protocol Recordings]
- Stadiumx and Muzzaik - Rollerkraft [Onelove Records]
- Stadiumx and Taylr Renee - Howl At The Moon [Protocol Recordings]

=== Remixes ===
- Nicky Romero, Marf and Wulf - Okay (Stadiumx Remix) [Protocol Recordings]
- Maone and Vjs featuring Kplr - Wonderland (Stadiumx Edit)
- Dash Berlin and Jordan Grace - No Regrets (Stadiumx Remix)
- Lakshmi - Wars (Stadiumx Remix)
- StadiumX and Sebastian Wibe featuring Lena Leon - Illusions (VIP Mix)
- Stadiumx - Be Mine (Stadiumx and Metrush Remix)
- Metrush and Gspr - Somebody (Stadiumx Edit) [Hexagon]
- Nicky Romero and David Guetta - Ring the Alarm (Stadiumx Remix) [Protocol Recordings]
- Lost Frequencies featuring The Nghbrs - Like I Love You (Stadiumx Remix) [Astrx]
- Gryffin featuring Elley Duhé - Tie Me Down (Stadiumx Remix) [Darkroom / Geffen Records]
- Deepend and Joe Killington - Could Be Love (Stadiumx Remix) [Spinnin' Records]
- David Guetta featuring Sam Martin - Lovers On The Sun (Stadiumx Remix) [What A Music]
- Matrix & Futurebound - Don't Look Back featuring Tanya Lacey (Stadiumx Remix) [3Beat]
- Wilkinson featuring Tom Cane - Half Light (Stadiumx Remix) [RAM Records]
- Sultan + Ned Shepard featuring Zella Day and Sam Martin - All These Roads (Stadiumx Remix) [Parametric Records]
- Katy Perry - Roar (Stadiumx Bootleg) [Stadiumx]
- Robbie Rivera featuring Lizzie Curious - My Heart (Stadiumx Remix) [Black Hole Recordings]
- Manufactured Superstars featuring Danni Rouge - Like Satellites (Stadiumx Remix) [Black Hole Recordings]
- Cash Cash - Surrender (Stadiumx Remix) [Big Beat (Atlantic)]
- Gareth Emery featuring Gavin Beach - Eye Of The Storm (Stadiumx Remix) [Garuda Music]
- Robin Schulz featuring Francesco Yates - Sugar (Stadiumx Remix) [Tonspiel]
- Moguai featuring Tom Cane – You'll See Me (Stadiumx Remix) [Tonspiel]
- Sam Feldt and Deepend featuring Teemu - Runaways (Muzzaik and Stadiumx Remix) [Spinnin' Remixes]
- Oliver Moldan featuring Jasmine Ash - High and Low (Stadiumx Remix) [Tonspiel]
- Paul Oakenfold and Disfunktion featuring Spitfire - Beautiful World (Stadiumx Remix) [Perfecto Records]

=== Co-productions ===
- David Guetta featuring The Script - Goodbye Friend [What A Music]
