= Shot Me Down =

2014 single by David Guetta featuring Skylar Grey

Single by David Guetta featuring Skylar Grey

from the album Listen
- Released: 20 January 2014
- Recorded: 2013
- Genre: Electro house; big room house
- Length: 3:11
- Label: Parlophone
- Songwriters: David Guetta; Giorgio Tuinfort; Sonny Bono
- Producers: David Guetta; Giorgio Tuinfort; Ralph Wegner

David Guetta singles chronology
"Ain't a Party" (2013)	"Shot Me Down" (2014)	"Bad" (2014)

Skylar Grey singles chronology
"White Suburban" (2013)	"Shot Me Down" (2014)	"Bed of Lies" (2014)

"Shot Me Down" is a song by French house music producer and DJ David Guetta, featuring vocals from American singer Skylar Grey. The song was released on 20 January 2014 as a digital download. It was produced by David Guetta and Giorgio Tuinfort, with additional production from Ralph Wegner. "Shot Me Down" peaked at number six on the French Singles Chart. Outside France, "Shot Me Down" peaked within the top ten of the charts in Australia, Austria, Belgium (Wallonia), Denmark, Finland, Hungary, Ireland, Lebanon and the United Kingdom, and the top 20 of the charts in Germany, Italy and Spain. The original version of the song, "Bang Bang (My Baby Shot Me Down)", was released by Cher in 1966 and was famously covered by Nancy Sinatra in the same year.

== Critical reception ==
DJ Times described the song as "A clear departure from Guetta’s pop anthems of the past few years" and compared "the electro frenzy of percussion-laden drops and grinding pops" to Martin Garrix's song "Animals". Mike Wass of Idolator wrote: "The track closely follows Avicii's 'Wake Me Up' formula of blending raw acoustic moments — courtesy of Skylar Grey's husky vocal — with bone-rattling beats and the radio version simply trims away some of the instrumental." Robert Copsey of Digital Spy gave the song a mixed review stating:

"Even before listening to David Guetta's new single, it's difficult not to think, is this really necessary? And if you feel like you've already heard it before actually hearing it, it's because essentially you have; the Cher/Nancy Sinatra classic has not only been covered to death already, but a dance version created by production duo Audio Bullys in 2005 remains perfectly serviceable today. So why is he bothering? Surprisingly, the song's infamous chorus remains largely similar to the original here, even with Skylar Grey's vocal, which bears a haunting resemblance to Sinatra's. It's a shame then that it's been sandwiched between sections of menacing beats, strobing EDM and grinding bass. In separation they both sound like promising songs, but together, the result feels lazy and disjointed."

== Track listings ==
Digital download
No.	Title	Length
1.	"Shot Me Down" (featuring Skylar Grey)	3:11

CD single
No.	Title	Length
1.	"Shot Me Down" (featuring Skylar Grey) (original)	3:11
2.	"Shot Me Down" (featuring Skylar Grey) (extended)	5:15

== Charts and certifications ==
=== Weekly charts ===
Weekly chart performance for "Shot Me Down"
Chart (2014)	Peak position
Australia (ARIA)	3
Austria (Ö3 Austria Top 40)	9
Belgium (Ultratop 50 Flanders)	11
Belgium (Ultratop 50 Wallonia)	3
Canada Hot 100 (Billboard)	66
Czech Republic Airplay (ČNS IFPI)	1
Czech Republic Singles Digital (ČNS IFPI)	2
Denmark (Tracklisten)	8
Finland (Suomen virallinen lista)	8
France (SNEP)	6
Germany (GfK)	13
Hungary (Dance Top 40)	1
Hungary (Single Top 40)	9
Hungary (Stream Top 40)	1
Ireland (IRMA)	7
Italy (FIMI)	17
Lebanon (The Official Lebanese Top 20)	8
Luxembourg Digital Songs (Billboard)	2
Mexico Anglo (Monitor Latino)	8
Netherlands (Dutch Top 40)	17
Netherlands (Single Top 100)	8
New Zealand (Recorded Music NZ)	20
Poland Dance (ZPAV)	28
Russia Airplay (TopHit)	36
Scotland Singles (OCC)	3
Slovakia Airplay (ČNS IFPI)	1
Slovakia Singles Digital (ČNS IFPI)	1
Slovenia (SloTop50)	22
Spain (Promusicae)	13
Sweden (Sverigetopplistan)	16
Switzerland (Schweizer Hitparade)	6
UK Dance (OCC)	3
UK Singles (OCC)	4
Ukraine Airplay (TopHit)	16
US Bubbling Under Hot 100 (Billboard)	3
US Hot Dance/Electronic Songs (Billboard)	15
US Dance Club Songs (Billboard)	35

=== Year-end chart ===
Year-end chart performance for "Shot Me Down"
Chart (2014)	Position
Australia (ARIA)	53
Austria (Ö3 Austria Top 40)	33
Belgium (Ultratop Flanders)	55
Belgium (Ultratop Wallonia)	23
France (SNEP)	63
Germany (Official German Charts)	69
Hungary (Dance Top 40)	22
Hungary (Single Top 40)	53
Netherlands (Dutch Top 40)	78
Netherlands (Single Top 100)	91
Russia Airplay (TopHit)	85
Spain (PROMUSICAE)	40
Sweden (Sverigetopplistan)	67
Switzerland (Schweizer Hitparade)	70
Ukraine Airplay (TopHit)	182
UK Singles (Official Charts Company)	99
US Hot Dance/Electronic Songs (Billboard)	51

=== Certifications ===
Region	Certification	Certified units/sales
Australia (ARIA)	2× Platinum	140,000^{^}
Austria (IFPI Austria)	Gold	15,000^{*}
Canada (Music Canada)	Gold	40,000^{*}
Germany (BVMI)	Gold	150,000^{‡}
Italy (FIMI)	Gold	15,000^{‡}
Mexico (AMPROFON)	Platinum	60,000^{*}
New Zealand (RMNZ)	Gold	7,500^{*}
Sweden (GLF)	2× Platinum	80,000^{‡}
Switzerland (IFPI Switzerland)	Gold	15,000^{^}
United Kingdom (BPI)	Gold	400,000^{‡}
Streaming
Denmark (IFPI Danmark)	Gold	1,300,000^{†}
Spain (Promusicae)	Gold	4,000,000^{†}
^{*} Sales figures based on certification alone.^{^} Shipments figures based on certification alone.^{‡} Sales+streaming figures based on certification alone.^{†} Streaming-only figures based on certification alone.

== Release history ==
Region	Date	Format	Label
Various	20 January 2014	Digital download (Extended)	What a Music
Italy	31 January 2014	Radio airplay	Parlophone; Warner Music
France	3 February 2014	Digital download	Parlophone; Warner Music
United Kingdom	10 February 2014	Digital download	Parlophone; Warner Music
