= Bad (David Guetta and Showtek song) =

Single by David Guetta and Showtek featuring Vassy

from the album Listen
- Released: 17 March 2014
- Genre: Big room house
- Length: 2:50 (radio edit); 4:30 (extended mix)
- Label: Parlophone; Jack Back; What a Music
- Songwriters: David Guetta; Wouter Janssen; Sjoerd Janssen; Giorgio Tuinfort; Ossama Al Sarraf; Ned Shepard; Manuel Reuter; Vassy; Nick Turpin
- Producers: David Guetta; Showtek; Sultan & Ned Shepard; Manuel Reuter

David Guetta singles chronology
"Shot Me Down" (2014)	"Bad" (2014)	"Blast Off" (2014)

Showtek singles chronology
"We Like to Party" (2013)	"Bad" (2014)	"Bouncer" (2014)

Vassy singles chronology
"Mad" (2014)	"Bad" (2014)	"Hustlin" (2014)

Music video
- "Bad" on YouTube

"Bad" (also stylised as "BAD!") is a song by French music producer and DJ David Guetta and Dutch production duo Showtek, featuring vocals from Australian singer Vassy. It was released on 17 March 2014 as a single of the deluxe version from Guetta's studio album, Listen. It was written and produced by Guetta, Showtek, Sultan & Ned Shepard, and Manuel Reuter and it was co-written by Giorgio Tuinfort, Ossama Al Sarraf, Vassy, and Nick Turpin. The song entered and peaked on the UK Singles Chart at number 22. This track has since topped the chart in Finland and Norway. The song, which features vocals from Vassy, features her with an Auto-Tuned voice; reviews were critical of the effects applied to the vocals.

== Lyric video ==
The lyric video is on both David Guetta's YouTube and Vevo account. It is a total of 2 minutes and 50 seconds long. It was released on 10 April 2014.

It starts out with a girl fighting zombies while the zombies dance as a reference to Michael Jackson's "Thriller". Suddenly, she falls in love with one of the zombies who goes up to her, and the two run away from the military, who are chasing them.

== Critical reception ==
Mike Wass of Idolator wrote: "The grittier electro-house sound of 'Bad' is perhaps an indication that the hitmaker is moving away from the commercial dance sound of his last LP. Former hardstyle duo Showtek ensure that the beats come thicker and faster than ever, while Australian dance diva Vassy provides the instantly catchy hook—albeit in a heavily autotuned voice."

== Track listing ==
Digital download
No.	Title	Length
1.	"Bad" (featuring Vassy) (extended mix)	4:30

Digital download - radio edit
No.	Title	Length
1.	"Bad" (featuring Vassy) (radio edit)	2:50

== Charts ==
=== Weekly charts ===
Weekly chart performance for "Bad"
Chart (2014–2015)	Peak position
Australia (ARIA)	5
Australia Dance (ARIA)	1
Austria (Ö3 Austria Top 40)	15
Belgium (Ultratop 50 Flanders)	12
Belgium (Ultratop 50 Wallonia)	16
Canada Hot 100 (Billboard)	20
CIS Airplay (TopHit)	130
Colombia (National-Report)	23
Czech Republic Airplay (ČNS IFPI)	49
Czech Republic Singles Digital (ČNS IFPI)	2
Denmark (Tracklisten)	12
Finland (Suomen virallinen lista)	1
France (SNEP)	6
Germany (GfK)	19
Hungary (Dance Top 40)	3
Hungary (Single Top 40)	5
Hungary (Stream Top 40)	1
Ireland (IRMA)	33
Italy (Dance Club Chart Top 50)	2
Mexico Anglo Airplay (Monitor Latino)	4
Netherlands (Dutch Top 40)	13
Netherlands (Single Top 100)	13
New Zealand (Recorded Music NZ)	25
Norway (VG-lista)	1
Poland Dance (ZPAV)	3
Russia Airplay (TopHit)	111
South Korea (Gaon International)	1
Scottish Singles Sales (Official Charts)	8
Slovakia Airplay (ČNS IFPI)	42
Slovakia Singles Digital (ČNS IFPI)	6
Spain (Promusicae)	42
Sweden (Sverigetopplistan)	2
Switzerland (Schweizer Hitparade)	28
UK Singles (Official Charts)	22
UK Dance (Official Charts)	8
US Bubbling Under Hot 100 (Billboard)	13
US Dance Club Songs (Billboard)	31
US Hot Dance/Electronic Songs (Billboard)	11

=== Year-end charts ===
Year-end chart performance for "Bad"
Chart (2014)	Peak position
Australia (ARIA)	59
Austria (Ö3 Austria Top 40)	46
Belgium (Ultratop Flanders)	36
Belgium (Ultratop Wallonia)	51
Denmark (Tracklisten)	22
France (SNEP)	60
Germany (Official German Charts)	55
Hungary (Dance Top 40)	17
Hungary (Single Top 40)	54
Italy (FIMI)	62
Netherlands (Dutch Top 40)	49
Netherlands (Single Top 100)	41
Sweden (Sverigetopplistan)	5
US Hot Dance/Electronic Songs (Billboard)	24

Chart (2015)	Position
Hungary (Dance Top 40)	82

== Certifications ==
Region	Certification	Certified units/sales
Australia (ARIA)	2× Platinum	140,000^{^}
Canada (Music Canada)	Gold	40,000^{*}
Italy (FIMI)	Platinum	30,000^{‡}
Mexico (AMPROFON)	Platinum	60,000^{*}
New Zealand (RMNZ)	Platinum	30,000^{‡}
Poland (ZPAV)	Gold	25,000^{‡}
Spain (Promusicae)	Platinum	40,000^{‡}
Sweden (GLF)	5× Platinum	200,000^{‡}
United Kingdom (BPI)	Platinum	600,000^{‡}
United States (RIAA)	Platinum	1,000,000^{‡}
Streaming
Denmark (IFPI Danmark)	2× Platinum	5,200,000^{†}
Spain (Promusicae)	Platinum	8,000,000^{†}
^{*} Sales figures based on certification alone.^{^} Shipments figures based on certification alone.^{‡} Sales+streaming figures based on certification alone.^{†} Streaming-only figures based on certification alone.
