= The Click Tour =

2018 concert tour by AJR

- Tour by AJR
- Promotional poster for the tour
- Location: North America
- Associated album: The Click
- Start date: February 8, 2018
- End date: December 21, 2018
- No. of shows: 46
- Supporting acts: Hundred Handed; Grizfolk; Ocean Park Standoff; MAX; Robert DeLong
- Attendance: 66,516 (Note: Attendance over the reported 38 dates)
- Box office: $1,567,314 (Note: Amount grossed over the reported 38 dates)

AJR concert chronology
- What Everyone's Thinking Tour (2017); The Click Tour (2018); Neotheater World Tour (2019–2020)

The Click Tour was the third concert tour by American indie pop band AJR, supporting their second studio album, The Click (2017). It ran from February 8, 2018, to December 21, 2018, and covered 46 shows across North America. The set list consisted primarily of songs from The Click, additionally including "I'm Ready" from Living Room (2015), "Don't Throw Out My Legos" from Neotheater (2019), and cover songs.

== Background and development ==
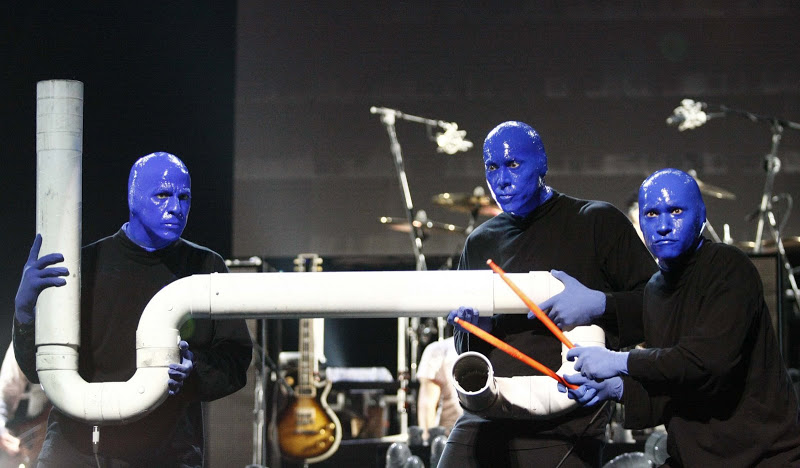
Blue Man Group performing music with large plastic pipework.

Following their second studio album The Click (2017), AJR announced the Click Tour on November 14 in the same year. Tickets became available for sale on November 17, covering 32 dates between February and May 2018 in the US and Canada. For the tour, AJR took inspiration from the non-standard artforms used by Blue Man Group, Stomp, and other Broadway productions, consistently interacting with their audience and intending to make the concerts unpredictable. The band claimed that every show for part one of the Click Tour sold out, additionally noting a wider age range at their concerts. Band member Adam Met cited the success of "Sober Up" reaching number one on Billboard's Alternative Songs chart as a factor.

The band announced a second leg of the Click Tour on June 22, 2018, with 14 dates between October and December. In contrast to the previous leg containing every song on The Click, several songs were removed and replaced with the newly released "Role Models" and the then unreleased "Don't Throw Out My Legos". The latter would later appear on the band's third studio album, Neotheater (2019). The show's How We Made segment was additionally used for "Burn the House Down" rather than "Drama". During the November 4 show at Stage AE in Pittsburgh, AJR announced that they would donate a majority of the night's profits to those affected by the Tree of Life synagogue shooting. In a 2019 interview with Substream Magazine, the band claimed the tour sold over 100,000 tickets.

== Set list ==
The following set lists are adapted from the show in Austin on February 17 and the show in New York City on December 21. It is not intended to represent all shows throughout the tour.

=== Leg one ===
1. "Overture"
2. "Come Hang Out"
3. "Three-Thirty"
4. "Chim Chim Cher-ee"
5. "Netflix Trip"
6. "Sober Up"
7. "I'm Not Famous"
8. "No Grass Today"
9. "Call My Dad"
10. "The Good Part"
11. "Burn the House Down"
12. "I'm Ready"
13. How We Made / "Drama"
14. "Turning Out"
15. "Bud Like You"

Encore

16. "Weak"

=== Leg two ===
1. "Overture"
2. "Come Hang Out"
3. "Three-Thirty"
4. "The Jitterbug"
5. "Sober Up"
6. "The Good Part"
7. "I'm Not Famous"
8. "Role Models"
9. "Drama"
10. "Don't Throw Out My Legos"
11. "Netflix Trip" / The Office theme
12. "Bud Like You"
13. "Turning Out"
14. How We Made / "Burn the House Down"

Encore

15. "Weak"

== Tour dates ==
List of concerts
| Date (2018) | City | Country | Venue | Opening act | Attendance | Revenue |
Part 1
| February 8 | Raleigh | United States | Lincoln Theatre | Hundred Handed; Grizfolk | 755 / 800 | $13,592 |
| February 9 | Atlanta | United States | Buckhead Theatre | Hundred Handed; Grizfolk | 1,375 / 1,375 | $28,875 |
| February 10 | Charlotte | United States | The Underground | Hundred Handed; Grizfolk | 800 / 800 | $14,400 |
| February 12 | Fort Lauderdale | United States | Revolution Line | Hundred Handed; Grizfolk | —N/a | —N/a |
| February 13 | Orlando | United States | House of Blues | Hundred Handed; Grizfolk | 2,077 / 2,100 | $36,834 |
| February 16 | Dallas | United States | House of Blues | Hundred Handed; Grizfolk | —N/a | —N/a |
| February 17 | Austin | United States | Emo's | Hundred Handed; Grizfolk | 1,550 / 1,550 | $34,100 |
| February 18 | Houston | United States | House of Blues | Hundred Handed; Grizfolk | 1,103 / 1,200 | $21,772 |
| February 20 | Memphis | United States | New Daisy Theatre | Hundred Handed; Grizfolk | 572 / 1,100 | $12,834 |
| February 21 | Nashville | United States | Cannery Ballroom | Hundred Handed; Grizfolk | —N/a | —N/a |
| February 22 | Asheville | United States | The Orange Peel | Hundred Handed; Grizfolk | 1,050 / 1,050 | $18,900 |
| March 17 | Salt Lake City | United States | The Complex | Hundred Handed; Ocean Park Standoff | 2,300 / 2,300 | $44,585 |
| March 20 | Los Angeles | United States | Belasco Theater | Hundred Handed; Ocean Park Standoff | 1,300 / 1,300 | $29,250 |
| March 21 | San Francisco | United States | The Fillmore | Hundred Handed; Ocean Park Standoff | 1,119 / 1,119 | $26,378 |
| March 23 | Portland | United States | Roseland Theater | Hundred Handed; Ocean Park Standoff | 1,350 / 1,350 | $32,102 |
| March 25 | Vancouver | Canada | Vogue Theatre | Hundred Handed; Ocean Park Standoff | —N/a | —N/a |
| March 26 | Seattle | United States | Neptune Theatre | Hundred Handed; Ocean Park Standoff | 1,000 / 1,000 | $18,000 |
| April 6 | Indianapolis | United States | Egyptian Room | Hundred Handed; Ocean Park Standoff | 1,900 / 1,900 | $31,536 |
| April 7 | Madison | United States | Majestic Theatre | Hundred Handed; Ocean Park Standoff | 600 / 600 | $11,700 |
| April 8 | Minneapolis | United States | Music Hall | Hundred Handed; Ocean Park Standoff | 1,125 / 1,125 | $31,880 |
| April 10 | Omaha | United States | Sokol Auditorium | Hundred Handed; Ocean Park Standoff | 1,400 / 1,400 | $27,300 |
| April 11 | Kansas City | United States | The Truman | Hundred Handed; Ocean Park Standoff | 1,273 / 1,273 | $22,914 |
| April 13 | Saint Louis | United States | Delmar Hall | Hundred Handed; Ocean Park Standoff | 750 / 750 | $13,500 |
| April 14 | Chicago | United States | House of Blues | Hundred Handed; MAX | 1,250 / 1,250 | $25,964 |
| April 15 | Detroit | United States | Saint Andrew's Hall | Hundred Handed; MAX | 1,000 / 1,000 | $19,500 |
| April 17 | Columbus | United States | Newport Music Hall | Hundred Handed; MAX | 2,200 / 2,200 | $39,600 |
| April 18 | Cleveland | United States | House of Blues | Hundred Handed; MAX | 1,300 / 1,300 | $24,933 |
| April 19 | Silver Spring | United States | The Fillmore | Hundred Handed; MAX | 2,000 / 2,000 | $38,180 |
| April 21 | New York City | United States | Terminal 5 | Hundred Handed; MAX | 2,800 / 2,800 | $78,310 |
| May 9 | Toronto | Canada | The Opera House | Hundred Handed; MAX | 810 / 850 | $14,190 |
| May 10 | Montreal | Canada | Corona Theatre | Hundred Handed; MAX | 781 / 891 | $11,005 |
| May 12 | Boston | United States | House of Blues | Hundred Handed; MAX | 2,425 / 2,425 | $58,660 |
Part 2
| October 26 | Dallas | United States | South Side Ballroom | Robert DeLong | —N/a | —N/a |
| October 31 | Atlanta | United States | Buckhead Theatre | Robert DeLong | 3,729 / 3,729 | $97,498 |
| November 1 | Raleigh | United States | The Ritz | Robert DeLong | 1,974 / 1,974 | $50,227 |
| November 3 | Philadelphia | United States | The Fillmore | Robert DeLong | 2,500 / 2,500 | $69,023 |
| November 4 | Pittsburgh | United States | Stage AE | Robert DeLong | 2,300 / 2,300 | $49,286 |
| November 6 | Toronto | Canada | Rebel | Robert DeLong | —N/a | —N/a |
| November 8 | Chicago | United States | Aragon Ballroom | Robert DeLong | —N/a | —N/a |
| November 9 | Milwaukee | United States | Eages Ballroom | Robert DeLong | 3,562 / 4,000 | $93,250 |
| November 10 | Minneapolis | United States | Myth Live | Robert DeLong | 2,930 / 2,950 | $80,665 |
| November 13 | Denver | United States | Fillmore Auditorium | Robert DeLong | 3,600 / 3,600 | $99,850 |
| November 15 | Phoenix | United States | The Van Buren | Robert DeLong | 1,900 / 1,900 | $47,500 |
| November 17 | San Francisco | United States | SF Masonic Auditorium | Robert DeLong | 3,102 / 3,106 | $98,291 |
| November 18 | Los Angeles | United States | Hollywood Palladium | Robert DeLong | 2,954 / 3,600 | $100,930 |
| December 21 | New York City | United States | Hammerstein Ballroom | —N/a | —N/a | —N/a |
