= What Everyone's Thinking Tour =

2017 concert tour by AJR

- Tour by AJR
- Promotional poster for the tour
- Location: Europe; North America
- Associated album: What Everyone's Thinking
- Start date: February 22, 2017
- End date: September 24, 2017
- No. of shows: 37
- Supporting acts: Paul Pfau; Hey Monea!; Hailey Knox; Rozes; Johnny Balik
- Attendance: 11,693 (Note: Attendance over the reported 24 dates)
- Box office: $186,584 (Note: Amount grossed over the reported 24 dates)

AJR concert chronology
- Infinity Tour (2014); What Everyone's Thinking Tour (2017); The Click Tour (2018)

The What Everyone's Thinking Tour was the second concert tour by American indie pop band AJR, supporting their third extended play, What Everyone's Thinking (2016). It ran from February 22 to September 24, 2017, and covered 37 shows across the United States and England. The set list included each song from the EP alongside tracks from their debut album, Living Room (2015), other singles, and cover songs.

== Background and development ==
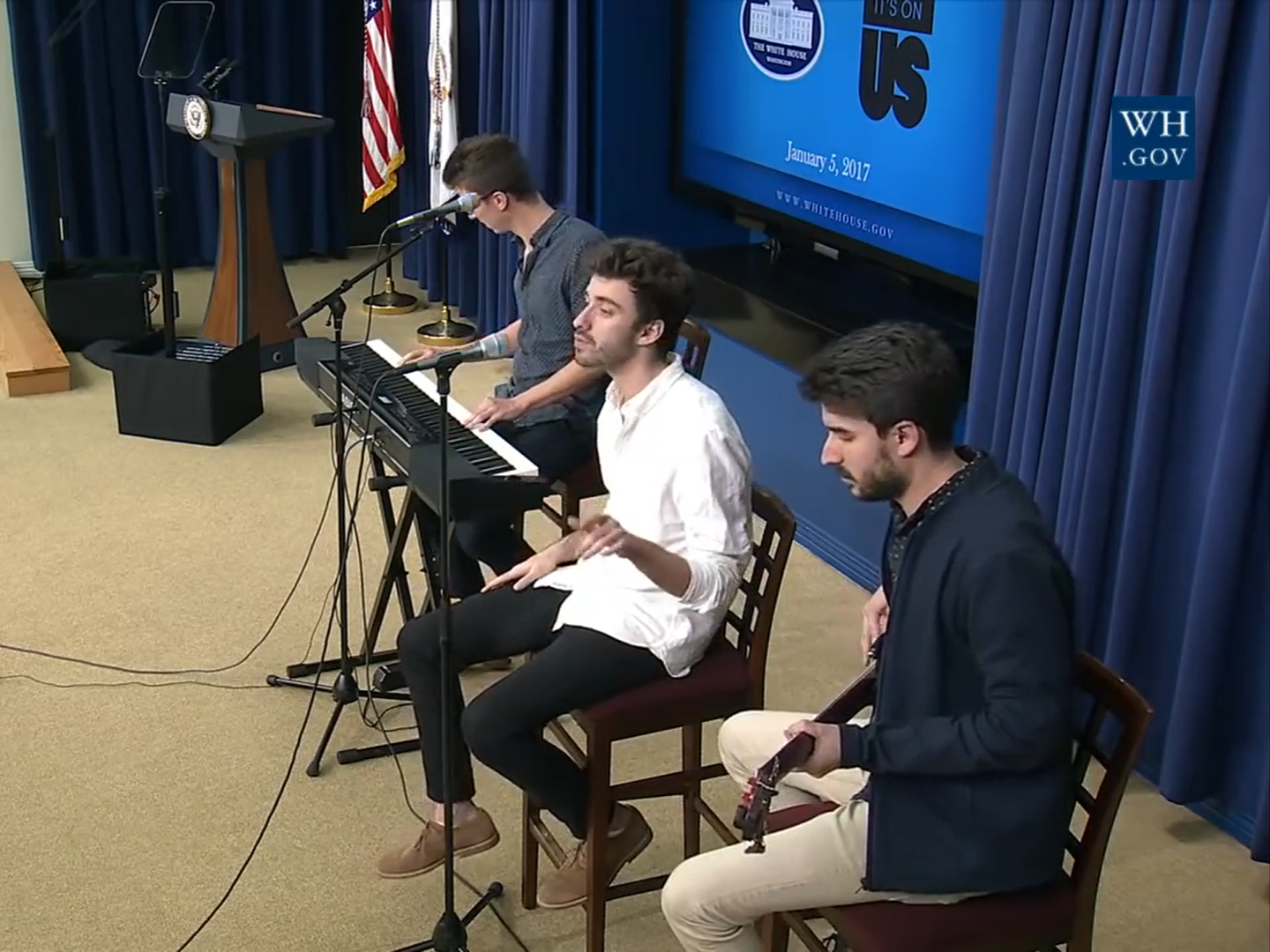
AJR performing live in 2017

In 2016, AJR began touring as Ingrid Michaelson's opening act. They planned the What Everyone's Thinking Tour during that time, targeting the same audiences that they were then opening for. The band prioritized incorporating remixes, drum solos, and interactivity into effect-heavy shows, creating a unique experience from the studio versions of the songs. AJR announced one show of the What Everyone's Thinking Tour on social media per day throughout October, totaling 15 dates throughout the United States for early 2017. A second date at the Gramercy Theatre was added once their first show at the venue sold out. The leg began on February 22 in Orlando, Florida, and concluded on March 18 in Salt Lake City, Utah, with Hailey Knox supporting 11 dates.

Alongside the announcement of The Click on April 5, the band announced a second leg of the tour with 19 more dates through the summer. Tickets for these shows became available on April 7, featuring Rozes as an opening act. Starting on June 10 with three album release shows, the tour continued through the United States with various shows selling out. The band attributed the tour's success to their dedication to the shows, emphasizing that they care about every individual attendee regardless of audience size. They began and ended their performance of the song "Come Hang Out" with a drum solo, while "No Grass Today" was played acoustically from within the audience. The encore for "Weak" additionally included a drum solo. Dates in Europe for autumn later became available, ending the tour on September 24 in Manchester.

== Set list ==
The following set lists are adapted from the shows in New York City on March 11 and June 21. It is not intended to represent all shows throughout the tour.

=== Leg one ===
1. "I'm Not Famous"
2. "Thirsty"
3. "The Green and the Town"
4. "Call My Dad"
5. "I've Got No Strings" (remix)
6. "Come Hang Out"
7. "Woody Allen"
8. "Tiptoe Through the Tulips" (remix)
9. "Sunday Candy"
10. "Let the Games Begin"
11. "Pitchfork Kids"
12. "Infinity"
13. Remix story
14. "Turning Out"
15. "No Grass Today"
16. "I'm Ready"

Encore

17. "Weak"

=== Leg two ===
1. "I'm Not Famous"
2. "Thirsty"
3. "Three-Thirty"
4. "Call My Dad"
5. "Lollipop" (remix)
6. "Woody Allen"
7. "Come Hang Out"
8. "Pitchfork Kids"
9. "Netflix Trip"
10. "Heigh-Ho" (remix)
11. "Drama"
12. "Sober Up"
13. "Let the Games Begin"
14. Remix story
15. "Turning Out"
16. "No Grass Today"
17. "I'm Ready"

Encore

18. "Weak"

== Tour dates ==
List of concerts
Date (2017)	City	Country	Venue	Opening act	Attendance	Revenue
Part 1
February 22	Orlando	United States	The Social	—N/a	—N/a	—N/a
February 23	Atlanta	United States	Center Stage	—N/a	—N/a	—N/a
February 24	Charlotte	United States	The Evening Muse	Paul Pfau; Hey Monea!	—N/a	—N/a
February 25	Birmingham	United States	Saturn	—N/a	367 / 525	$7,073
February 27	Nashville	United States	The High Watt	Hailey Knox	222 / 222	$4,590
March 1	Green Bay	United States	Meyer Theatre	Hailey Knox	—N/a	—N/a
March 2	Minneapolis	United States	The Garage	Hailey Knox	—N/a	—N/a
March 4	Chicago	United States	Bottom Lounge	Hailey Knox	—N/a	—N/a
March 5	Detroit	United States	The Shelter	—N/a	—N/a	—N/a
March 6	Columbus	United States	The Basement	Hailey Knox	300 / 300	$4,500
March 7	Washington, D.C.	United States	Jammin' Java	Hailey Knox	240 / 240	$3,925
March 9	Boston	United States	Brighton Music Hall	Hailey Knox	500 / 500	$9,250
March 10	Hamden	United States	The Space	Hailey Knox	—N/a	—N/a
March 11	New York City	United States	Gramercy Theatre	Hailey Knox	—N/a	—N/a
March 12	New York City	United States	Gramercy Theatre	Hailey Knox	—N/a	—N/a
March 18	Salt Lake City	United States	In The Venue	Hailey Knox	—N/a	—N/a
Part 2
June 10	Salt Lake City	United States	In The Venue	—N/a	1,500 / 1,500	$25,504
June 13	Los Angeles	United States	Troubadour	—N/a	500 / 500	$9,420
June 21	New York City	United States	Bowery Ballroom	—N/a	550 / 550	$9,600
July 7	Cleveland	United States	Grog Shop	—N/a	400 / 400	$6,090
July 8	Covington	United States	Madison Theater	—N/a	300 / 300	$4,500
July 11	Indianapolis	United States	Old National Centre	—N/a	750 / 750	$11,817
July 13	Milwaukee	United States	The Rave II	—N/a	800 / 800	$11,200
July 16	Omaha	United States	Slowdown	—N/a	750 / 750	$11,277
July 18	Oklahoma City	United States	Diamond Ballroom	—N/a	500 / 500	$7,500
July 19	Dallas	United States	House of Blues	Rozes	400 / 400	$5,600
July 20	Houston	United States	House of Blues	—N/a	300 / 300	$4,575
July 26	Phoenix	United States	Pub Rock	—N/a	350 / 350	$6,080
July 28	Anaheim	United States	House of Blues	—N/a	325 / 325	$4,875
July 29	San Diego	United States	House of Blues	—N/a	250 / 250	$3,759
July 30	Los Angeles	United States	Troubadour	Johnny Balik	500 / 500	$7,500
August 1	Fresno	United States	Strummer's	Johnny Balik	364 / 400	$5,564
August 2	Berkeley	United States	Cornerstone	Johnny Balik	500 / 500	$7,000
August 4	Portland	United States	Hawthorne Theatre	Johnny Balik	550 / 550	$8,260
August 6	Seattle	United States	The Crocodile	—N/a	475 / 475	$7,125
September 23	London	England	Omearea	—N/a	—N/a	—N/a
September 24	Manchester	England	Sound Control	—N/a	—N/a	—N/a
