= What Everyone's Thinking =

EP by AJR
- Released: September 16, 2016
- Recorded: 2015–2016
- Genres: Indie pop; electropop
- Length: 20:07
- Labels: AJR Productions; BMG; S-Curve
- Producer: Ryan Met

AJR chronology
Living Room (2015)	What Everyone's Thinking (2016)	The Click (2017)

Singles from What Everyone's Thinking
- 1. "I'm Not Famous" Released: March 25, 2016; 2. "Weak" Released: September 16, 2016

What Everyone's Thinking is the third extended play by American indie pop band AJR. It was released on September 16, 2016, via the band's label AJR Productions. The EP contains five songs, all of which were later included on the band's second studio album The Click.

== Background ==
AJR released two extended plays after their debut single "I'm Ready": 6foot1 (2013), and Infinity (2014). These were in promotion of their debut studio album, Living Room (2015). While creating these releases, the band focused on producing songs before writing lyrics around them. AJR chose to adapt a different style for later work, prioritizing lyricism before composing its instrumental. The band additionally wrote songs for a potential second album during Living Room's creative process, leaving the tracks off their debut with the intention of a different sound. One of these was "Let the Games Begin", which released later in the year as a standalone single. A second single followed on December 18 as "Call My Dad".

== Promotion and release ==
"I'm Not Famous" was released on March 25, 2016, as the lead single of What Everyone's Thinking. The EP was teased on social media on August 25 and released September 16, 2016. "Weak" was released alongside the EP as the second single.

Four of the EP's five songs received music videos, with "I'm Not Famous" releasing a video on April 25, 2016, "Weak" receiving a music video on March 9, 2017, "Come Hang Out" receiving a music video in collaboration with Original Penguin on February 6, 2018, and "Turning Out" receiving a Pixar-inspired music video on October 18, 2018.

On June 16, 2025, AJR announced a new EP that was a spiritual successor to What Everyone's Thinking, titled What No One's Thinking. The EP was released on September 5th of 2025.

== What Everyone's Thinking Tour ==
Through October 2016, AJR announced individual shows of the What Everyone's Thinking Tour on social media. The tour began on February 22 in Orlando, Florida, and continued through the United States in the summer with a second leg announced alongside The Click on April 5. These concerts were in support of the EP and included each of its songs, as well as selections from Living Room. It included Hailey Knox, Rozes, Paul Pfau, Hey Monea!, and Johnny Balik as opening acts. Various shows on the tour sold out, including three album release shows in June. Autumn dates in Europe were later added to the end of the tour. Across 24 of its 37 concerts, the tour saw an attendance of 11,693 people and grossed $186,584 in ticket sales.

== Critical reception ==
Professional ratings
Review scores
Source	Rating
AllMusic	(favorable)
Reading Eagle	A

What Everyone's Thinking received favorable reviews, with AllMusic describing the songs as "stomp-along, arena-friendly pop anthems".

== Track listing ==
All tracks are written by Jack and Ryan Met, except where noted.

What Everyone's Thinking track listing
No.	Title	Length
1.	"Come Hang Out"	4:26
2.	"Weak"	3:21
3.	"Turning Out"	4:20
4.	"I'm Not Famous"	3:40
5.	"No Grass Today"	4:20
Total length:		20:07

CD bonus track
No.	Title	Writer(s)	Length
6.	"The Lotto" (with Ingrid Michaelson)	Michaelson	3:13
Total length:			23:20

== Personnel ==
Credits adapted from Tidal.

AJR

- Jack Met – lead vocals, guitar, melodica, percussion, ukulele
- Ryan Met – vocals, keyboards, trumpet, ukulele, production, programming
- Adam Met – vocals, bass guitar

Additional personnel

- Chris Gehringer – mastering (4)
- Delbert Bowers – audio engineer (4)
- John Loren – artwork

== Charts ==
"What Everyone's Thinking" charted in the top 10 albums on iTunes within a day of its release.

Weekly chart performance for What Everyone's Thinking
Chart (2017)	Peak position
US Billboard 200	164
