= The Click (album) =

Studio album by AJR
- Released: June 9, 2017
- Recorded: 2015–2017
- Genre: Pop
- Length: 48:07
- Labels: AJR; S-Curve; Ultra; Black Butter
- Producer: Ryan Met

AJR chronology
What Everyone's Thinking (2016)	The Click (2017)	Neotheater (2019)

Singles from The Click
- 1. "Call My Dad" Released: December 18, 2015; 2. "I'm Not Famous" Released: March 25, 2016; 3. "Weak" Released: September 16, 2016; 4. "Drama" Released: May 12, 2017; 5. "Sober Up" Released: June 9, 2017; 6. "The Good Part" Released: November 24, 2021

The Click is the second studio album by American indie pop band AJR. It was released on June 9, 2017, via the band's labels AJR Productions and S-Curve Records, and later released internationally through Ultra Records and Black Butter Records. The album sonically follows the trio's previous work, maintaining a pop sound with elements of hip-hop, electronic dance music, and jazz. It includes a sole guest appearance from Rivers Cuomo of the band Weezer while taking influence from Fun, Twenty One Pilots, Kendrick Lamar, and Kanye West.

The five-track extended play What Everyone's Thinking supported it in September 2016, which had the singles "I'm Not Famous" and "Weak". All songs featured on it would appear on The Click, alongside newer singles including "Sober Up". A deluxe edition was released on September 21, 2018, supported by the single "Burn the House Down" and an acoustic version of the band's collaboration with Steve Aoki and Lil Yachty, "Pretender". "The Good Part" was retroactively released as a single in 2021 after going viral. To promote the album, AJR performed the 46-date The Click Tour throughout 2018, as well as publishing music videos for ten of the album's songs.

Upon release, The Click was met with generally positive reviews from music critics, praising the band's lyrics and production. Some retrospective mentions of the project view it negatively. The album was a commercial success, staying on the Billboard 200 for nearly a year with support from the high charting and streaming performances of "Weak", "Sober Up", and "Burn the House Down". The album received platinum certification in the US, silver in the UK, and gold in Canada with over two billion Spotify streams.

== Background and production ==
AJR released their debut studio album Living Room in 2015, following the extended plays 6foot1 (2013) and Infinity (2014). The former featured the single "I'm Ready". On The Click, the band primarily focused on songwriting, producing songs based on their lyrics; a departure from Living Room's emphasis on production. "I'm Not Famous" was the first song written for their next project. Its concept was born from the band's newfound fame following their debut album's success, still feeling obscure despite fan reception. "Come Hang Out" originated from a struggle to balance creating music that the band wanted to with appealing to a larger audience for marketability. AJR subsequently began theming the album around the song, additionally titling the project The Click after a lyric from it.

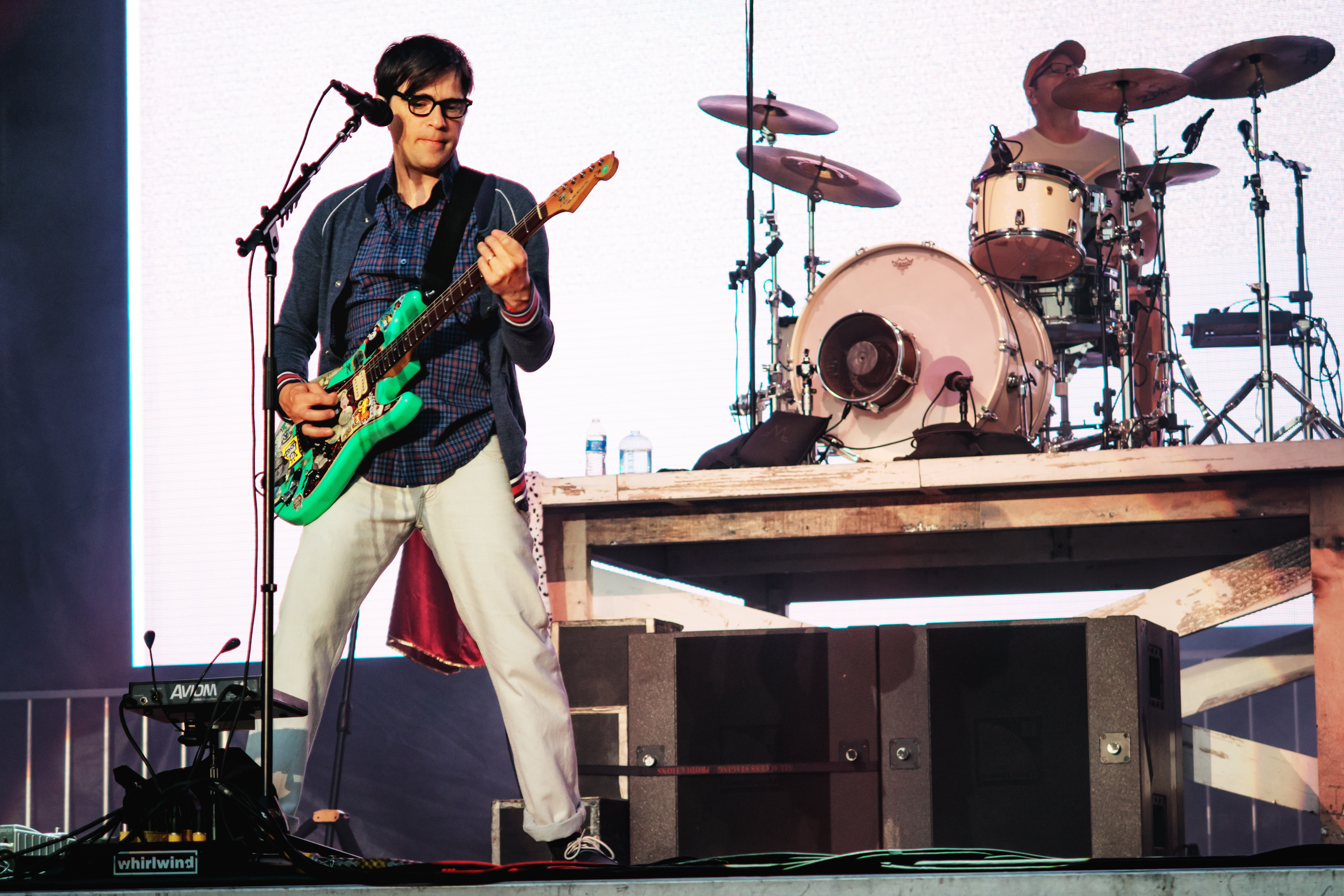
Rivers Cuomo in 2017

AJR was influenced by Fun and Twenty One Pilots to employ realism in their lyrics over impactful instrumentation, leading them to write the song "Weak". The band quickly built its concept around the drop, completing the song in one day. Band member Jack Met began writing "The Good Part" on AJR's sleeper bus during their tour with Ingrid Michaelson in 2016, making it the only track from The Click to not be composed in the band's living room. It additionally samples a Johann Sebastian Bach piece. The success of "Weak" as a single led Rivers Cuomo, the lead singer of Weezer, to contact AJR. There was mutual admiration between the two, which led to them collaborating on the creation of "Sober Up", with Cuomo contributing the bridge after receiving an unfinished version from the band.

AJR musically took inspiration from Kendrick Lamar's hip-hop style for "Drama", additionally adapting electronic dance music for the track "Three-Thirty". Band member Ryan Met associated his life experiences with episodes of The Office to write "Netflix Trip", encompassing the effect television shows have on personality and behavior. With "Bud Like You", Jack and Ryan took inspiration from a low-quality party they attended and characterized it, stating "a best friend is the person that you could just hate everything with". The band finished by creating "Overture", an overture of the album sampling every song. During writing, AJR tried to mimic the soundscape of American rapper Kanye West's album The College Dropout, adding violins reminiscent of Disney music, trumpets, and orchestral embellishments. During the production of The Click, AJR additionally wrote "Normal" and "Pretender", which would later be included on the album's deluxe version alongside the newly written tracks "Burn the House Down" and "Role Models".

== Songs ==
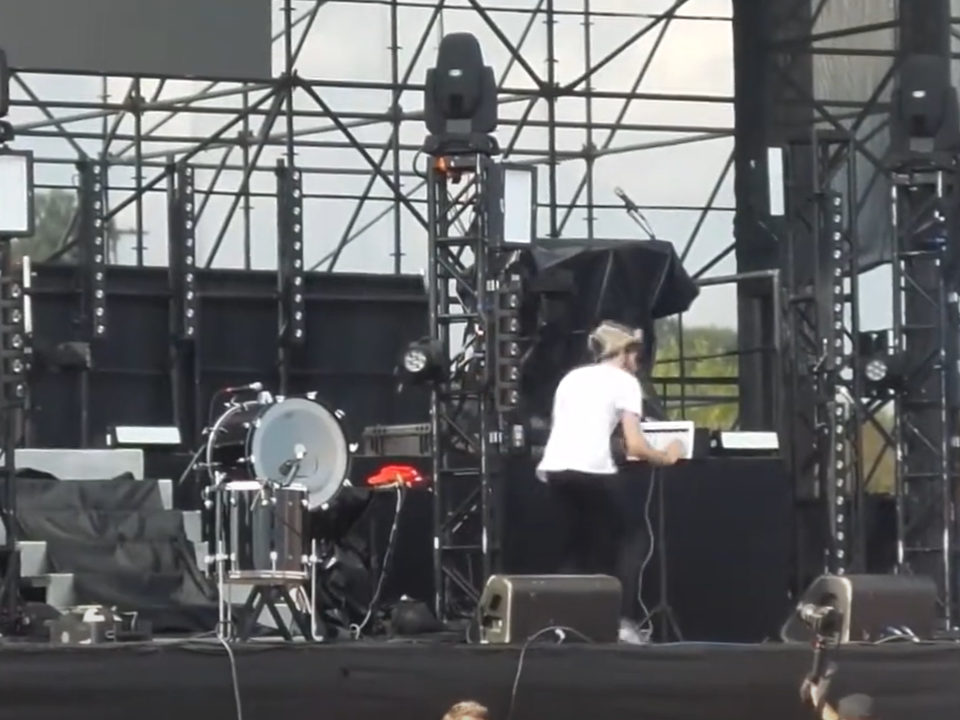
AJR using spokestep for "I'm Not Famous"

Various songs on The Click use spokestep, a term AJR uses to refer to a vocal manipulation technique similar to dubstep. It's featured on "Weak", "Drama", "No Grass Today", "I'm Not Famous", and "Bud Like You". "Overture" opens The Click as a medley of other songs featured on the album. "The Good Part" solemnly discusses the band wanting to skip to the best part of their lives. "Weak" has lyrics describing human vulnerability and acceptance with an upbeat pop composition. Jack and Ryan reflect on their time at Columbia University in "Sober Up", encapsulating themes of longing and reminiscence while remaining uplifting. "Drama" scrutinizes society for not focusing on political concerns, alluding to the feud between Katy Perry and Taylor Swift. "Turning Out" is a slow piano-based song, using mellow instrumentation with a focus on vocals.

"No Grass Today" advocates for the legality of cannabis, stating a personal disinterest in smoking but not wishing to condemn any users of it. "Three-Thirty" uses elaborate lyricism in its verses while utilizing an instrumental chorus acting as a drop, with the song having an exact length of 3:30. "Call My Dad" solely contains Ryan using an electronic vocoder while singing with no accompaniment, additionally interpolating a harmony from "Sloop John B". The track discussing wanting comfort from his father. "I'm Not Famous" lyrically embraces the notion of contentment in not being famous, using indie pop instrumentation with jazz aspects to accompany it. "Netflix Trip" compares various life experiences to events in the American television sitcom The Office. The song "Bud Like You" follows a style remniscent of campfire songs mixed with electronic dance instrumentation. "Come Hang Out" is the final song on The Click, lyrically discussing the difficulty of balancing social life with personal interests.

=== Deluxe edition ===
"Burn the House Down" was created when requested by Morgan Spurlock to create a theme song for the documentary Super Size Me 2: Holy Chicken!. AJR composed a track echoing the sentiments of the political landscape at the time and the rising influence of their generation, later becoming an anthem for the organization March for Our Lives. The band wrote "Role Models" as a response to the views of Kanye West, who is a significant influence on AJR's music. The song discusses the difficulty of enjoying the work of an artist while acknowledging their flaws, calling out Kanye West and Louis C.K. "Normal" reflects on an inability to fit in with friends and a resulting alienation. "Pretender" (acoustic) is an acoustic rendition of the Steve Aoki song of the same name, which featured the band alongside Lil Yachty. The song discusses social media facades, contrasting online personas with real-life insecurities. It was initially a scrapped demo by AJR, later receiving new production after being approached by Aoki to collaborate.

=== Other material ===
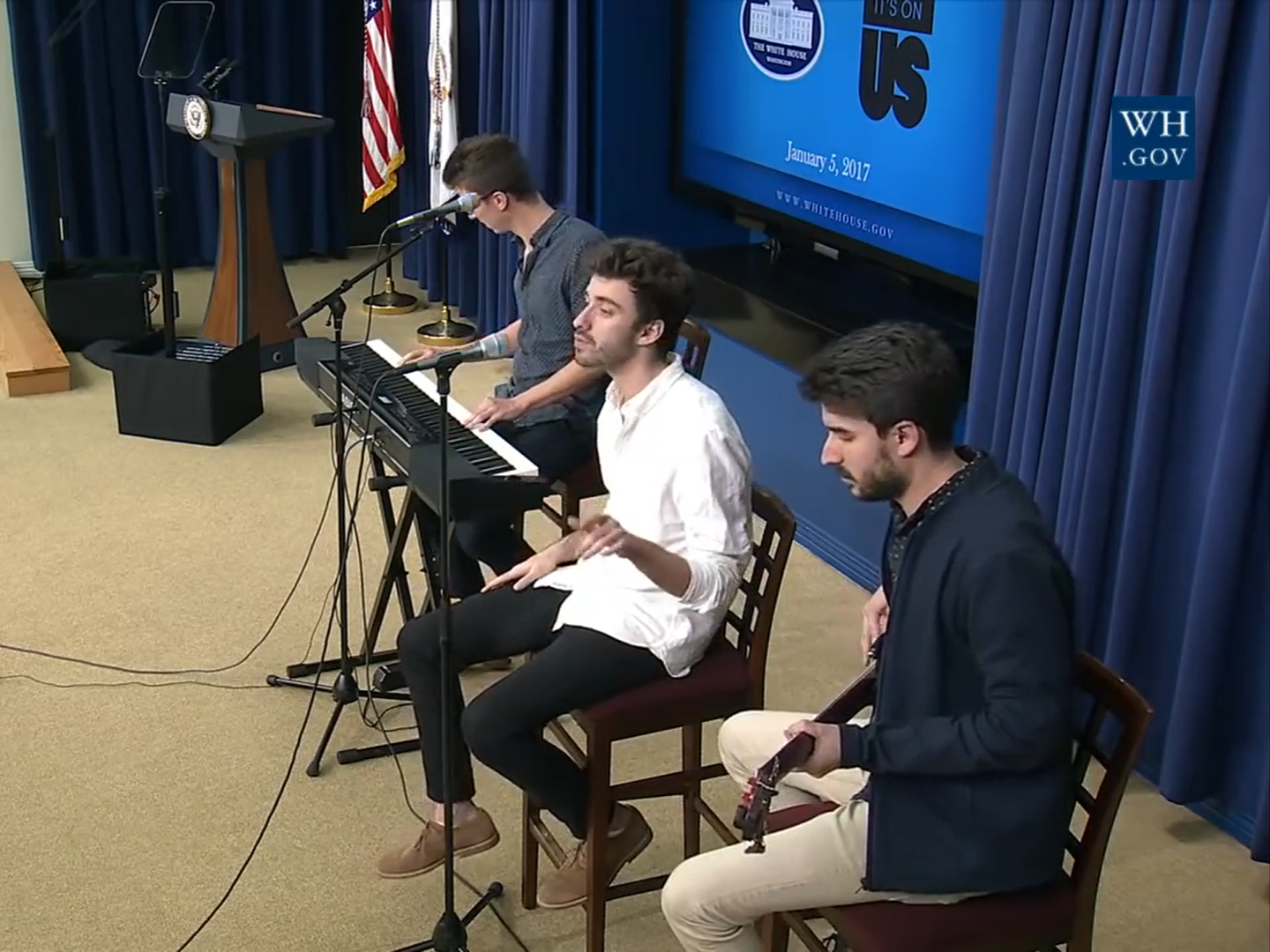
AJR performing "It's On Us" at the White House in 2017

"Let the Games Begin" was released as a single on October 23, 2015, via the band's label AJR Productions. It instrumentally uses energetic electronic elements. The song was featured in promotion for The Click, but does not appear on the tracklist. In 2016, the band made "Enjoy the Show", written for a New York City creativity competition. The demo is under two minutes in length. "It's On Us" was written by AJR in collaboration with the It's On Us campaign. After Barack Obama heard the band on Spotify, he invited the band to contribute to the campaign. The song was inspired by stories from sexual assault survivors. It was released as a single on March 31, 2017, with the band donating all proceeds from the song to the initiative. Similarly to "Let the Games Begin" and "Enjoy the Show", the song was not included on the album.

== Marketing ==
=== Release ===
"Call My Dad" was released as a promotional single on December 18, 2015, followed by "I'm Not Famous" as the lead single of What Everyone's Thinking on March 25, 2016, with the EP later releasing on September 16. Its tracklist included "Come Hang Out", "Turning Out", "No Grass Today", and "Weak", with the latter being the EP's second single. These two singles later became singles for The Click, with "Drama" as the album's following single in May 2017. The album was released on June 9, 2017, with "Sober Up" later becoming the fifth single. On March 23, 2018, AJR released "Burn the House Down" as a single. On September 21, the song appeared on the deluxe version of The Click alongside an acoustic performance of "Pretender". "The Good Part" became a popular song on TikTok and Instagram in late 2021, with AJR re-releasing the song as the sixth single of The Click on November 24, 2021.

=== Music videos ===
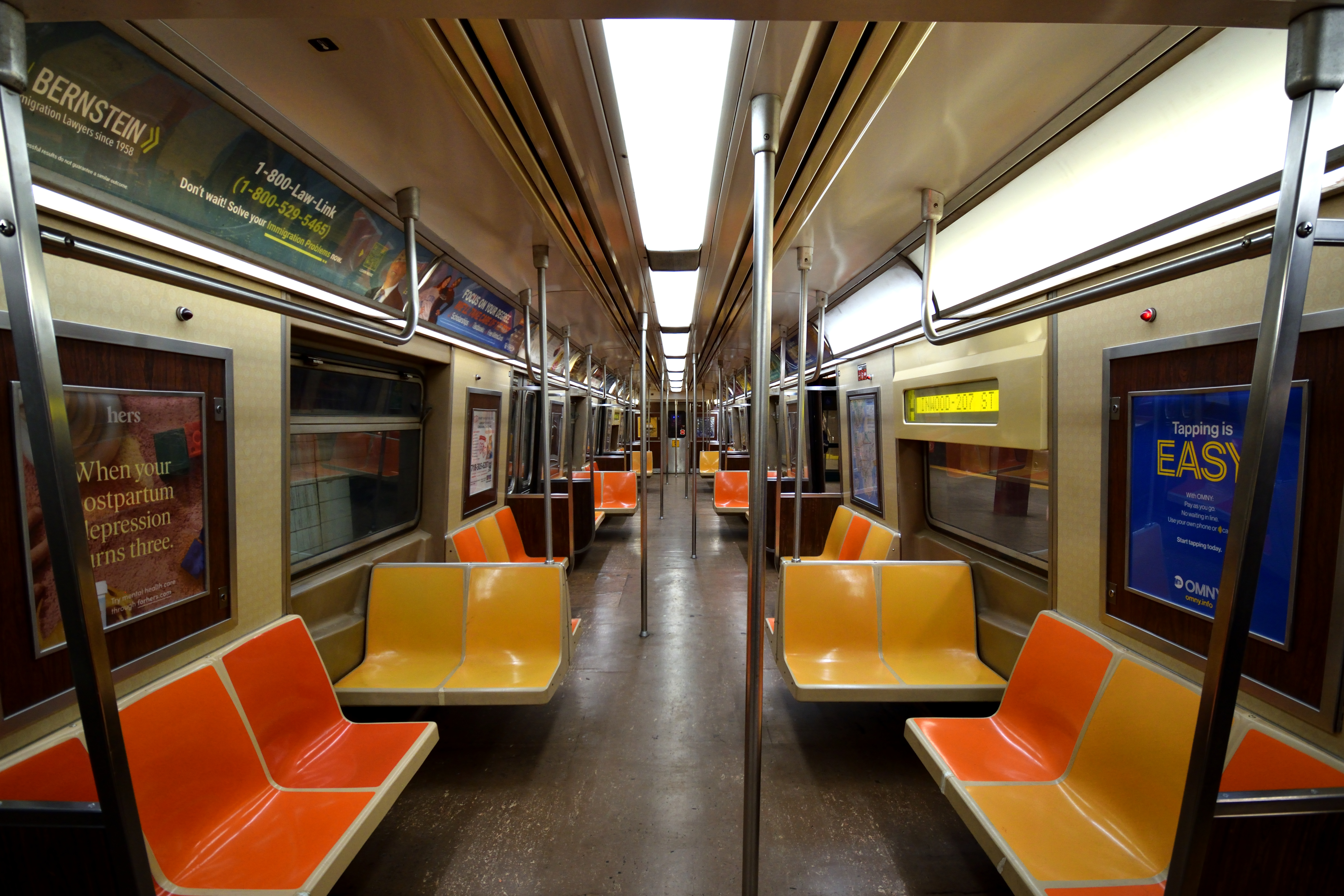
The subway "Weak" was filmed in

Ten music videos have been released for The Click. A music video for "Call My Dad" was released shortly after the single, with Ryan singing in a taxi surrounded by his sleeping brothers. The video for "I'm Not Famous" features Jack roaming the streets of New York City. A second music video was released later, showcasing the band performing amidst various stunts. AJR performed "Weak" in a New York City subway for a music video directed by Shane Drake. "Overture" had a music video released for it on December 15. More videos for The Click were published in 2018, beginning with "Sober Up" on January 31. Throughout it, the band navigates New York City, with Jack encountering and chasing a young version of himself.

A music video for "Come Hang Out" depicting a house party was released in collaboration with Original Penguin on February 7, 2018, followed on August 30 by a music video for "Burn the House Down" that blends the band's performance of the song with political imagery and a fiery riot. AJR released the music video for "Role Models" on September 25, which showcases the band playing the song while seated in a minimalist warehouse. A video for "Turning Out" was released on October 18 with direction by Jack and Ryan, depicting a developing love interest between two astronauts in space. It had a two-year development, with AJR hiring Pixar interns from a concert in Salt Lake City. After going viral, a video for "The Good Part" released on November 24, 2021. In it, the band performs the song while various home movies are shown.

=== The Click Tour ===
In November 2017, AJR announced a concert tour entitled the Click Tour. It was in support of and primarily featured songs from The Click, including Hundred Handed, Grizfolk, Ocean Park Standoff, MAX, and Robert DeLong as opening acts. For it, AJR drew inspiration from Blue Man Group and Stomp, aiming for interactive and unpredictable performances. The first leg ran from February 8 to May 12, 2018, with 32 shows across the US and Canada. A second leg was announced after the first, including 14 dates and running from October 26 to December 21, 2018. During the November 4 show in Pittsburgh, the band announced they would donate most profits accumulated from the concert to those affected by the Tree of Life synagogue shooting. All shows on the tour sold out, with the tour's April 21 concert at Terminal 5 in New York City garnering $78,310 in revenue among 2,800 attendees.

== Reception ==
The album received generally positive reviews upon release. Matt Collar of AllMusic lauded the album's "eclectic, hooky pop", highlighting "Weak" as a "buoyant, electronic-tinged single". Atticus Dewey of the Communicator commended The Click for its wide range of emotion, finding it primarily positive while condemning the track "Three-Thirty" as filler. Jamie Weikel of Reading Eagle praised the album for its "catchy pop lyrics paired with EDM-esque beats". WQAQ additionally reviewed the album positively, comparing AJR's percussion and synthesizers to music from American musician Jon Bellion.

The album garnered more critical scrutiny following the release of Neotheater (2019) and OK Orchestra (2021). While reviewing the former, Luke Nuttall of the Soundboard called The Click "a hideous Frankenstein's monster of an indie-pop album patching together clichés and screeching obnoxiousness by the pound". In Thomas Stremfel's review of OK Orchestra for Spectrum Culture, he compared the strong negativity online to "figuratively tap[ing] a photo of AJR frontman Jack Met to a punching bag and ha[ving] a field day". Contrarily, Armando Padron of the Highway Herald gave The Click a score of 10/10 in 2020, praising the spirited instrumentation and lyrical themes of growth in "Sober Up" and "Netflix Trip".

== Commercial performance ==
The Click was a commercial success, becoming the band's breakthrough album. It was AJR's first studio album to chart on the Billboard 200, debuting at number 61 and remaining on the chart for 45 weeks. It additionally charted in Belgium for one week at position 170. Within its first two years of release, the album had earned 590,000 album-equivalent units in the United States and accumulated a total of 631.1 million on-demand audio streams for its tracks, reaching over 120 million views on YouTube by 2018, and over two billion streams on Spotify by early 2024. The album was certified platinum in the US, silver in the UK, and gold in Canada, equivalent to 1,000,000 sales, 60,000 sales, and 40,000 sales, respectively. "Weak", "Sober Up", and "Burn the House Down" each went multi-platinum in the US and Canada. The former charted in numerous countries, amassing 250 million streams within its first year.

== Track listing ==
All tracks are written by Ryan Met, Jack Met, Adam Met, except where noted.

The Click track listing
No.	Title	Writer(s)	Length
1.	"Overture"		3:34
2.	"The Good Part"		3:47
3.	"Weak"		3:21
4.	"Sober Up" (featuring Rivers Cuomo)	R. Met; J. Met; A. Met; Cuomo	3:38
5.	"Drama"		3:24
6.	"Turning Out"		4:20
7.	"No Grass Today"		4:20
8.	"Three-Thirty"		3:30
9.	"Call My Dad"		2:15
10.	"I'm Not Famous"		3:40
11.	"Netflix Trip"		3:57
12.	"Bud Like You"		3:50
13.	"Come Hang Out"		4:26
Total length:			48:07

Deluxe edition bonus tracks
No.	Title	Length
14.	"Burn the House Down"	3:32
15.	"Role Models"	3:12
16.	"Normal"	3:05
17.	"Pretender" (acoustic)	3:01
Total length:		60:57

== Personnel ==
Credits adapted from the album's liner notes.

AJR

- Adam Met – bass guitar, backing vocals (1–8, 10–17), keyboards (15–17)
- Jack Met – lead vocals, melodica, percussion, ukulele, guitar (1–8, 10–17)
- Ryan Met – backing vocals, keyboards, trumpet, ukulele (1–8, 10–17), lead vocals (9, 11), production, programming (all tracks), audio mixing (1, 2, 4, 7–9, 11–13, 15–17), audio mastering (17)

Technical

- Chris Gehringer – mastering engineer
- Joe Zook – audio mixing (3, 6)
- Tony Maserati – audio mixing (5)
- Delbert Bowers – audio mixing (10)
- Drew Allsbrook – audio mixing (14)
- John Loren – album artwork
- Chris Cerrato – album design
- Jon Minor – deluxe adjustments

Additional musicians

- Alba Avoricani – guest vocals (3)
- Rivers Cuomo – guest vocals, songwriting (4)
- Alex Wolff – guitar (4, 17)
- Alicia Svigals – violin (6, 7, 11, 13)
- Jake Kenowitz – trumpet (7, 11, 13)
- Samia Finnerty – guest vocals (13)
- Drew Allsbrook – guitar (15)
- JJ Kirkpatrick – trumpet (15, 17)

== Charts ==
Chart performance for The Click
Chart (2017)	Peak position
Belgian Albums (Ultratop Flanders)	170
US Billboard 200	61
US Independent Albums (Billboard)	9
US Top Album Sales (Billboard)	42

== Certifications ==
Certifications for The Click
Region	Certification	Certified units/sales
Canada (Music Canada)	Gold	40,000^{‡}
United Kingdom (BPI)	Silver	60,000^{‡}
United States (RIAA)	Platinum	1,000,000^{‡}
^{‡} Sales+streaming figures based on certification alone.

== Release history ==
Release dates and formats for The Click
Region	Date	Format(s)	Edition	Label	Ref.
United States	June 9, 2017	Digital download; streaming; CD	Standard	S-Curve	
Canada	June 9, 2017	Digital download; streaming; CD	Standard	Ultra	
Worldwide	June 30, 2017	Digital download; streaming; CD	Standard	Black Butter	
United States	January 19, 2018	Vinyl	Standard	S-Curve	
United States	September 21, 2018	Digital download; streaming; CD; vinyl	Deluxe	S-Curve	
Canada	September 21, 2018	Digital download; streaming	Deluxe	Ultra	
Various	September 21, 2018	Digital download; streaming	Deluxe	Black Butter	

== See also ==
- List of 2017 albums
