= Overture (AJR song) =

Overture (AJR song) may refer to:

- "Overture" (2015 AJR song), from Living Room
- "Overture" (2017 AJR song), from The Click
- "OK Overture", from OK Orchestra (2021)
