= Overture (2017 AJR song) =

2017 song by AJR

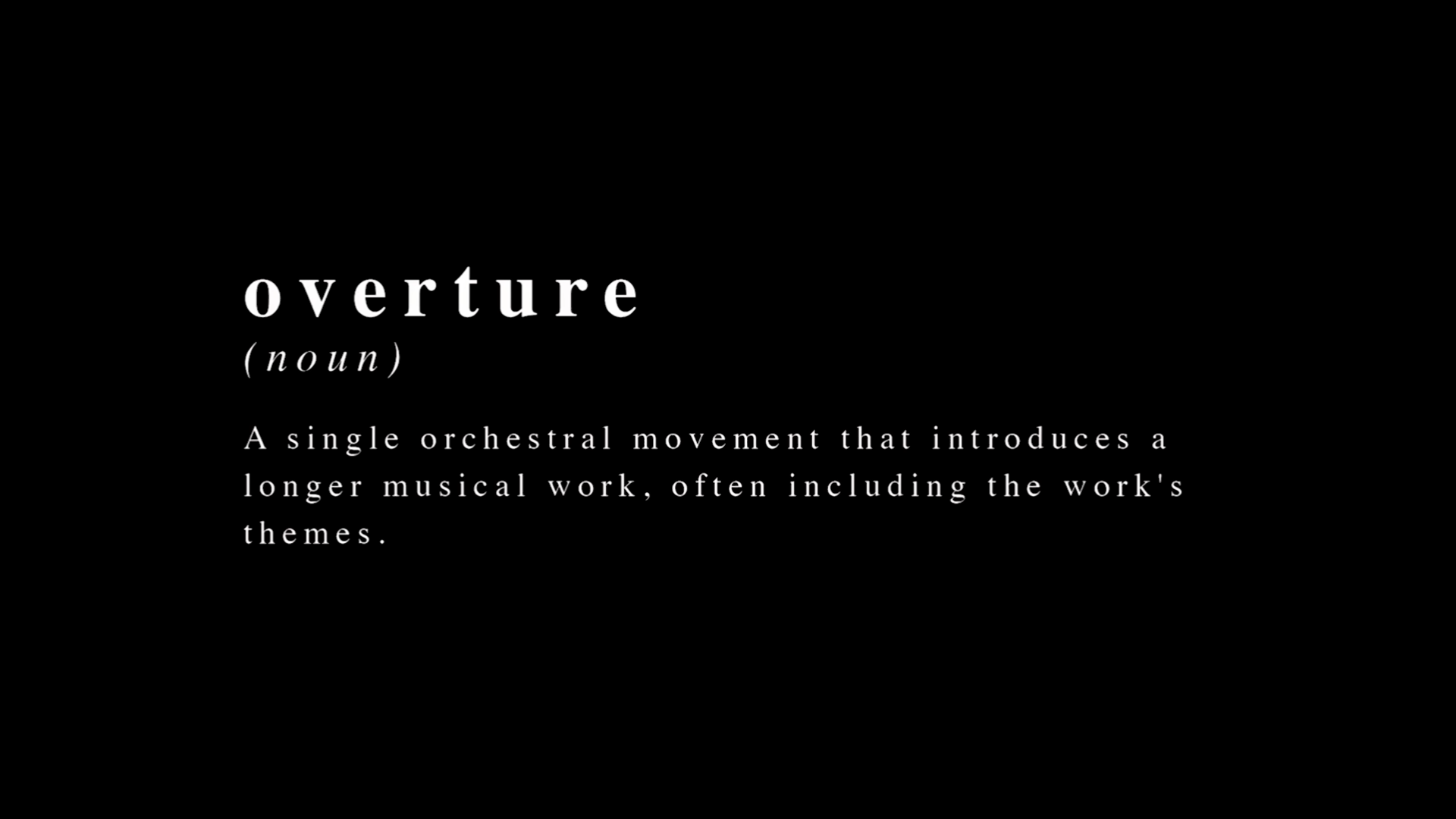
- Title card for the song's music video

Song by AJR

from the album The Click
- Released: June 9, 2017
- Genre: Electropop; jazz
- Length: 3:34
- Label: AJR Productions; S-Curve; Ultra; Black Butter
- Songwriters: Adam Met; Jack Met; Ryan Met
- Producer: Ryan Met

Music video
- "Overture" on YouTube

"Overture" is a song by American indie pop band AJR. It appears as the opening track of The Click, which was released via the band's label AJR Productions on June 9, 2017. The song is AJR's second overture, following one of the same name on their debut album Living Room. A music video was released later in the year, featuring the trio at various locations in Columbus, Ohio.

== Background ==
Following a song of the same name and nature from their debut studio album Living Room (2015), AJR created "Overture" solely for their second album, The Click (2017). The band created the song as "a modern version" of an overture from a Broadway show, naming Les Misérables and the Phantom of the Opera as inspirations. During the overture's writing, band member Ryan Met wanted to mimic the soundscape of The College Dropout by American rapper Kanye West. AJR later took inspiration from the orchestral soundtracks of Disney films by adding violins and trumpets to create a similar atmosphere. During the album's tour, "Overture" opened the concert with various stage effects while no members were present on-stage.

== Composition ==
"Overture" is an overture of The Click, sampling every song on the album. The song begins with an unaccompanied metronome, additionally used in "No Grass Today" and "Come Hang Out". A song that appears in the overture, "Drama", holds the position of a sample of "Let the Games Begin" that appeared in a demo.

== Music video and use in media ==
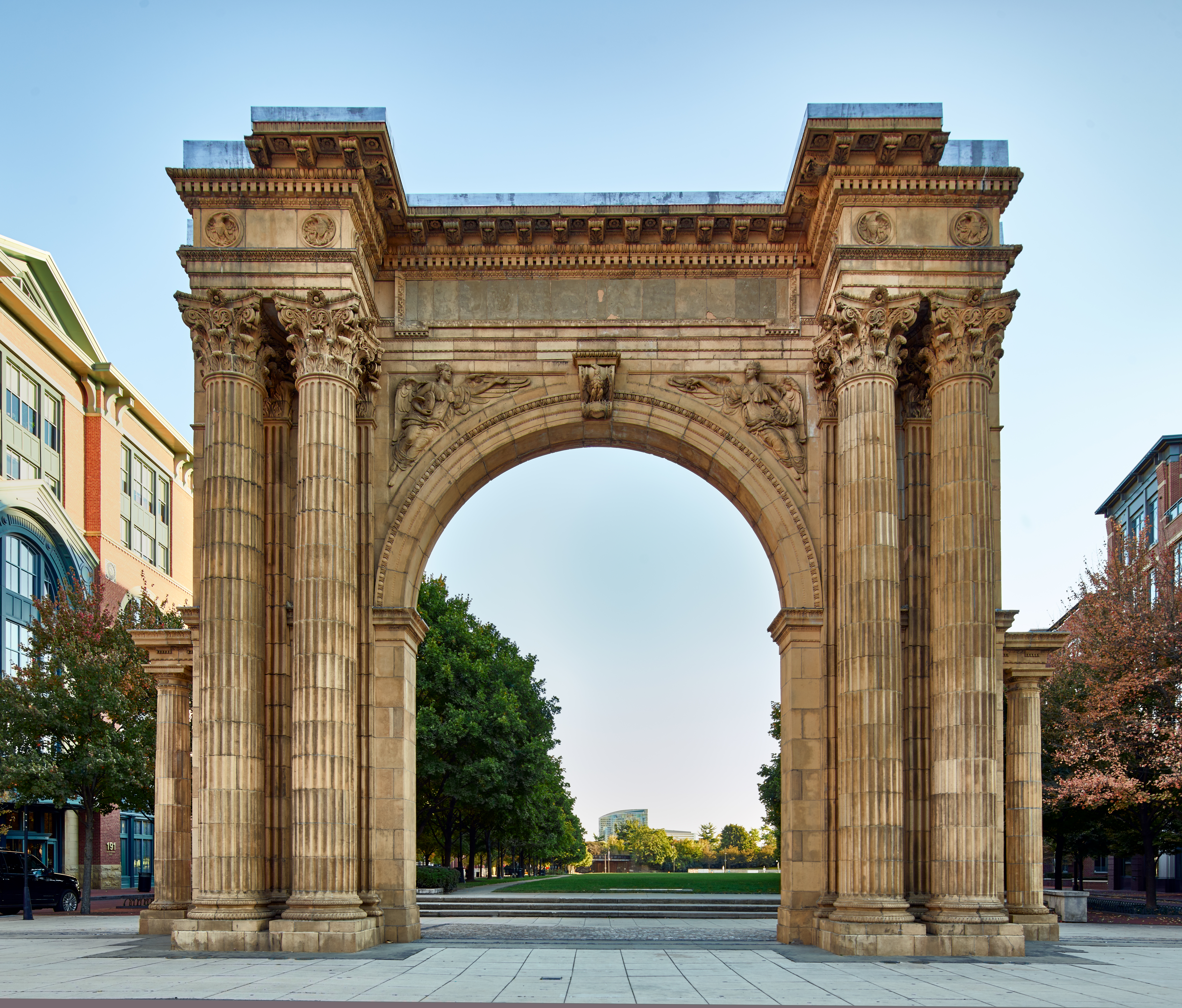
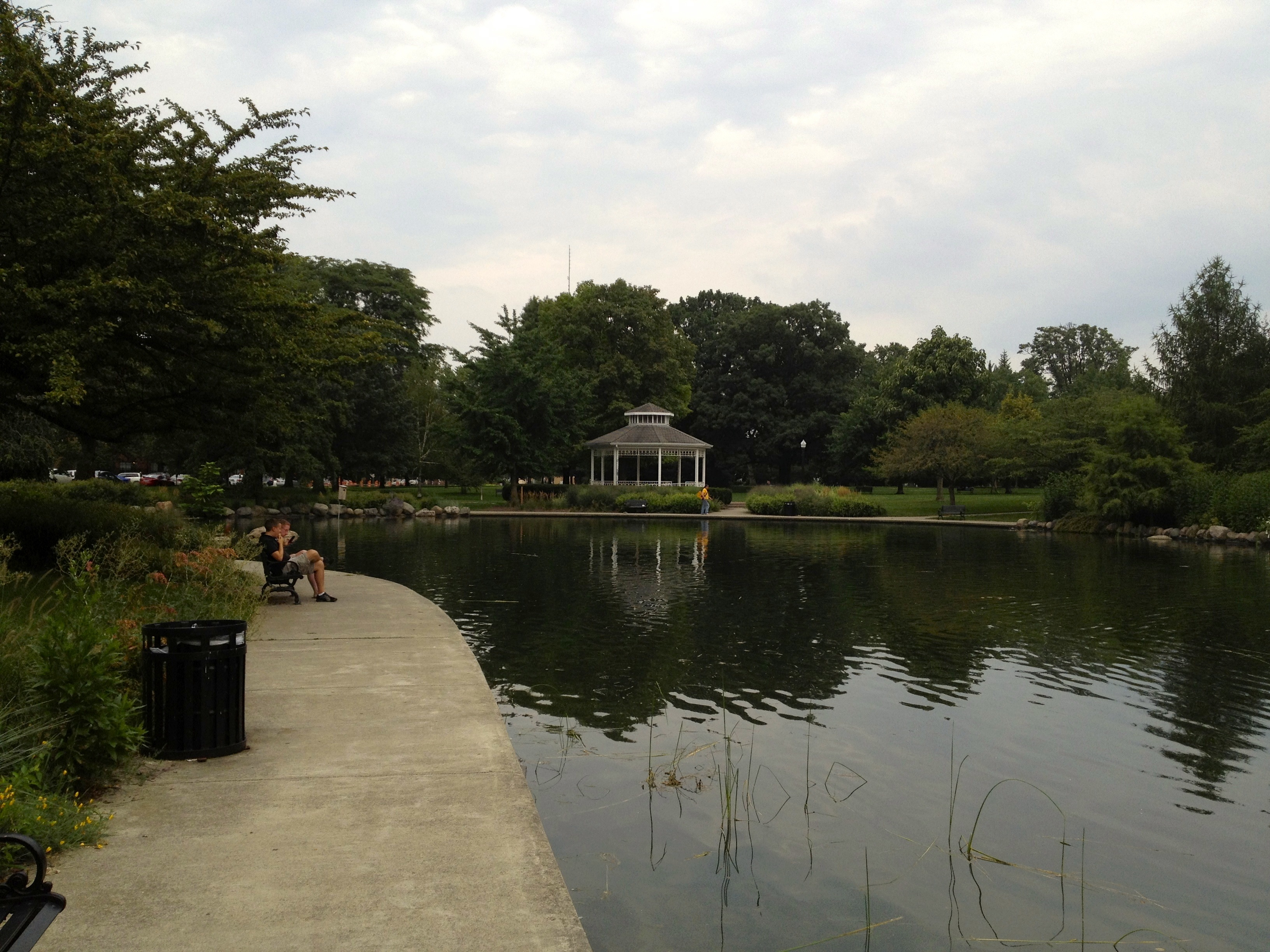
Filming locations for "Overture" include the Union Station arch and Goodale Park in Columbus, Ohio.

On December 15, 2017, a music video for "Overture" was released, with direction by Robert Quaintance. The band performs the song at various locations in Columbus, Ohio, with each sampled song's title appearing in line with the composition. On November 7, 2019, "Overture" was featured as the soundtrack of the first trailer for Pixar's animated film Soul. It appeared in further promotion in anticipation of the movie's release in late 2020. Via an Instagram post, the band stated that it was "Truly one of the coolest things to ever be a part of!"

== Personnel ==
Credits adapted from the album's liner notes.

- Adam Met – bass guitar, backing vocals
- Jack Met – lead vocals, melodica, percussion, ukulele, guitar
- Ryan Met – backing vocals, keyboards, trumpet, ukulele, production, programming, audio mixing
- Chris Gehringer – mastering engineer
