= Pretender (Steve Aoki song) =

2018 single by Steve Aoki, Lil Yachty, and AJR

Single by Steve Aoki featuring Lil Yachty and AJR

from the album Neon Future III and The Click (Deluxe Edition)
- Released: May 18, 2018
- Recorded: 2017–2018
- Genre: EDM; pop rap
- Length: 3:08
- Label: Ultra
- Songwriters: Steve Aoki; Lil Yachty; Adam Met; Jack Met; Ryan Met
- Producers: Steve Aoki; Ryan Met

Steve Aoki singles chronology
"Moshi Moshi" (2018)	"Pretender" (2018)	"Bella Ciao" (2018)

Lil Yachty singles chronology
"Ice Tray" (2017)	"Pretender" (2018)	"Who Want the Smoke?" (2018)

AJR singles chronology
"Burn the House Down" (2018)	"Pretender" (2018)	"100 Bad Days" (2019)

Music video
- "Pretender" on YouTube

"Pretender" is a song by American musician and DJ Steve Aoki featuring fellow American musicians Lil Yachty and AJR. It was released on May 18, 2018 via Ultra Records as the fifth single from Aoki's fifth studio album Neon Future III.

== Background ==
While AJR wrote their second studio album The Click, they wrote five additional songs that weren't released on the standard edition. After the album's release on June 9, 2017, Steve Aoki reached out to the band asking if they had any unfinished material, to which AJR sent "Pretender". Aoki then added additional production to the song, and contacted Lil Yachty, who wrote a new second verse for the track. The song was teased on social media on April 23 and officially released on May 18, 2018.

On July 13, 2018, several remixes of "Pretender" were released. Remixes were provided by Matoma, Blanke, Max Styler, and Aoki. An acoustic version of the song performed by AJR was eventually included on the deluxe edition of The Click.

== Music video ==
The official video directed by Tyler Yee was released on August 27, 2018. The video starts with Aoki sending a picture taken from a bedroom window disguised as the outdoors, and receiving thousands of likes. A majority of the video features more scenes of "pretenders" taking misleading photos, including Lil Yachty and AJR each singing in front of green screens.

== Personnel ==
Credits adapted from Tidal.

- Miles Parks McCollum – lead vocals, instruments, composer
- Adam Met – instruments, composer
- Jack Met – lead vocals, instruments, composer
- Ryan Met – backing vocals, instruments, composer, producer
- Steve Aoki – composer, producer

== Charts ==
Weekly chart performance for "Pretender"
Chart (2018)	Peak position
US Dance/Electronic Digital Song Sales (Billboard)	8
US Hot Dance/Electronic Songs (Billboard)	24
