= Role Models (song) =

2018 song by AJR

Song by AJR

from the album The Click (Deluxe Edition)
- Released: September 21, 2018
- Recorded: 2018
- Length: 3:12
- Label: AJR Productions; S-Curve; Ultra; Black Butter
- Songwriters: Jack Met; Ryan Met
- Producer: Ryan Met

Music video
- "Role Models" on YouTube

"Role Models" is a song by American indie pop band AJR, appearing on the 2018 deluxe edition of their second studio album, The Click (2017). It is the second song track in the edition and the album's fifteenth overall. The song tells the difficulty of separating art from its artist, naming Kanye West and Louis C.K. as examples.

== Background ==
"Role Models" is a politically driven song, written as a response to the media controversy surrounding Kanye West, a significant influence on AJR's music. Band member Adam Met cited My Beautiful Dark Twisted Fantasy (2010) as a favorite album of the trio in an interview with San Francisco Chronicle, later describing the difficulty of enjoying it with knowledge of West's character outside of music. "Role Models" was written and recorded after the release of AJR's second studio album, The Click (2017), receiving inclusion on the album's deluxe version on September 21, 2018. The song questions the dichotomy of appreciating an artist's work balanced with their flaws, resonating with the complexities of celebrity culture.

== Composition and production ==
The instrumentation of "Role Models" primarily uses acoustic guitar, additionally incorporating trumpet. AJR initially created this as a demo, intending to later add elements of electronic dance music as extra production to make it fit with the album. This idea was scrapped as the band felt it subtracted from the song's meaning. The song's guitar was recorded while the band toured in Arkansas, artificially distorting and compressing it. Band member Ryan Met then took inspiration from Fountains of Wayne's song "Fire Island" to create a reverberated trumpet that accompanied the guitar.

== Music video ==
On September 25, 2018, AJR released a music video for "Role Models" with direction by Spencer Hord. In the video, the band performs the song with guitar and ukulele while sitting on wooden crates with dark attire and bare feet. The camera slowly zooms out four times throughout the song to reveal a minimalist warehouse before sharply zooming in after each chorus, doing so in one shot. During the final portion, trumpeter JJ Kirkpatrick performs the song's trumpet behind the band.

== Personnel ==
Credits adapted from Tidal.

- Adam Met – bass guitar, backing vocals, keyboards
- Jack Met – lead vocals, percussion, guitar
- Ryan Met – backing vocals, ukulele, production, programming, audio mixing
- Chris Gehringer – mastering engineer
- Drew Allsbrook – guitar
- JJ Kirkpatrick – trumpet
- Jon Minor – deluxe adjustments

== See also ==
- List of one-shot music videos
