= Burn the House Down (song) =

2018 song by AJR

Single by AJR

from the album The Click (Deluxe)
- Released: March 23, 2018
- Recorded: 2017
- Genre: Pop
- Length: 3:32
- Label: AJR Productions; BMG; Ultra
- Songwriters: Adam Met; Jack Met; Ryan Met
- Producer: Ryan Met

AJR singles chronology
"Sober Up" (2017)	"Burn the House Down" (2018)	"Pretender" (2018)

Music video
- "Burn the House Down" on YouTube

"Burn the House Down" is a song by American indie pop band AJR. It was released on March 23, 2018, as a single from the deluxe edition of their second studio album The Click.

== Background ==
In 2017, Super Size Me 2: Holy Chicken!'s director Morgan Spurlock reached out to AJR via Twitter, asking the band to create the theme song for it. The band watched the documentary and later stated "we were blown away after watching the film, and we immediately connected with Morgan’s passion as an underdog trying to shed light on this corrupt giant". "Burn the House Down" additionally reflected the position of American politics in 2017, with member Ryan Met saying "there’s a tangible power that our generation now has, making real political change in the world. That energy excites us, so we wanted to write a song shedding light on it". AJR planned on releasing "Burn the House Down" in October 2017, but the song was pushed back for unknown reasons. It was teased on March 21 and released March 23, 2018. The song had received over 105 million streams as of July 2019, and has over 351 million streams as of September 2023.

== Composition ==
"Burn the House Down" is composed in 4/4 common time and in the key of A minor, with a tempo of 92 beats per minute (bpm).

During AJR's "How We Made" series and several of their tours, they showcased the step-by-step process of the creation of the song. The song's production began with an "angry and badass" bassline, applying Transient Designer to give the bass more attack. The band then created a drum kit for the song with a high-end filtered and distorted kick drum, a dubstep snare with a hand clap mixed in, and a hi-hat. Piano, organ, and percussion were later added to the bass and drums, nearly forming the full instrumental. Finally, the band wanted a "unique" instrument for the song's hook, initially trying marimba and cello before settling on a digitally pitch-bended trumpet.

== Music video ==
A music video directed by the Mitchells and Spencer Hord was released on August 30, 2018. The video cuts between the band performing the song in a purple-lit warehouse and the band sitting on a gold bench with blindfolds being led from room to room with political imagery before ending with a fiery protest. The video has grossed over 100 million views as of September 2023, making it the second most viewed video on the band's YouTube channel, the first most being "World's Smallest Violin".

== Use in media ==
"Burn the House Down" was used for the March for Our Lives protest in 2018, appearing in the announcement for the campaign's "Road to Change" tour. The band endorsed the campaign and partnered with March for Our Lives to educate their audience about ending gun violence and register voters at their concerts. However, AJR was initially conflicted about this use, with band member Adam Met later stating "we did not see AJR as a band that would lead the way towards a more progressive sunset. We saw this song as a way for us to question our own political responsibilities".

== Personnel ==
Credits adapted from Tidal.

- Adam Met – backup vocals, bass, composer
- Jack Met – main vocals, instruments, composer
- Ryan Met – backup vocals, instruments, composer, producer
- Chris Gehringer – audio mastering
- Drew Allsbrook – audio mixing

== Charts ==
"Burn the House Down" peaked at number 2 on the Billboard Alternative Airplay chart for six weeks in a row, with the band later tweeting:

...Maybe this can be a lesson to everyone: Don't be a chameleon trying to fit in, trying to sound like everyone else. Be a fucking peacock. Spread your colorful feathers and say to the world "THIS IS WHO I'M GONNA BE. I REALLY HOPE YOU CARE." And thank you, AJR fans, for caring.

=== Weekly charts ===
Weekly chart performance for "Burn the House Down"
Chart (2018–2019)	Peak position
Canada Hot 100 (Billboard)	99
Canada Rock (Billboard)	15
US Adult Pop Airplay (Billboard)	15
US Alternative Airplay (Billboard)	2
US Alternative Digital Song Sales (Billboard)	9
US Billboard Hot 100	100
US Rock & Alternative Airplay (Billboard)	5

=== Year-end charts ===
Year-end chart performance for "Burn the House Down"
Chart (2018)	Position
US Rock Airplay (Billboard)	13
Chart (2019)	Position
US Adult Top 40 (Billboard)	49

== Certifications ==
Certifications for "Burn the House Down"
Region	Certification	Certified units/sales
Australia (ARIA)	Platinum	70,000^{‡}
Canada (Music Canada)	3× Platinum	240,000^{‡}
New Zealand (RMNZ)	Platinum	30,000^{‡}
United Kingdom (BPI)	Silver	200,000^{‡}
United States (RIAA)	3× Platinum	3,000,000^{‡}
^{‡} Sales+streaming figures based on certification alone.

== Release history ==
Release dates and formats for "Burn the House Down"
Region	Date	Format(s)	Label	Ref.
Worldwide	March 23, 2018	Radio airplay; digital download; streaming	Ultra	
Various	September 21, 2018	7-inch	BMG	
