= Netflix Trip =

2017 song by AJR

Song by AJR

from the album The Click
- Released: June 9, 2017
- Recorded: 2015–2017
- Length: 3:57
- Label: AJR Productions; S-Curve; Ultra; Black Butter
- Songwriters: Jack Met; Ryan Met
- Producer: Ryan Met

Audio
- "Netflix Trip" on YouTube

"Netflix Trip" is a song by American indie pop band AJR. It appears as the eleventh track of The Click, which was released via the band's label AJR Productions on June 9, 2017. Band member Ryan Met began developing the song in early 2015, making it the first song written for the album. "Netflix Trip" lyrically connects emotionally to the American sitcom The Office, reflecting on its influence on his life. The track received praise for its coming-of-age narrative and unique concept. However, it drew criticism for beginning similarly to Jon Bellion's "Human", prompting AJR to claim that "Netflix Trip" had been written years earlier and that the similarity was unintentional, attributing it to shared influences.

== Background ==
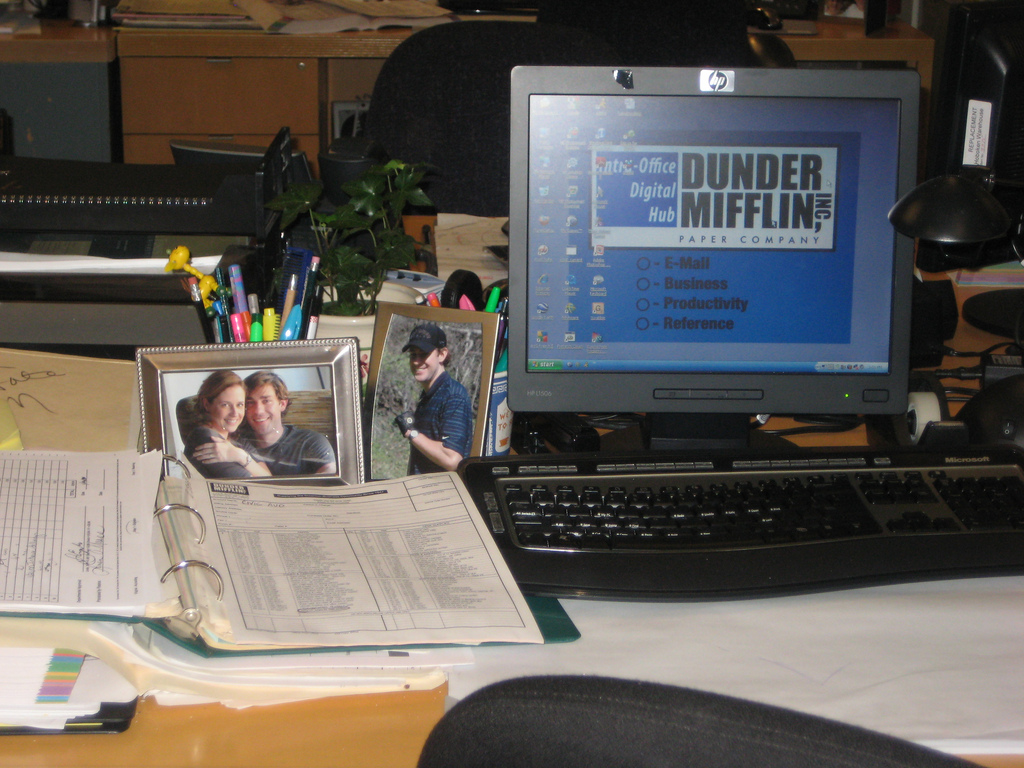
The Office (set pictured) played a large role in Ryan's personal life

AJR focused on deeply personal lyricism for The Click (2017), choosing subjects that were "the most strange, scary, maybe embarrassing things in our own lives". This mindset came from an emphasis on expressing natural feelings rather than forcing relatability in their music. Band member Ryan Met began writing "Netflix Trip" in early 2015, making it the first song written for the album. He took inspiration from the group's early emotional bond to the American sitcom The Office, which they watched on Netflix growing up. Various points of his life are connected to moments from the show, using it as relief from difficult events and reflecting on how its altered his life. He noted his tendency to imitate the actions of The Office's characters in real-life scenarios, such as the mannerism of crossing his legs similarly to Jim Halpert. The Click released on June 9, 2017, with "Netflix Trip" appearing as its eleventh track.

== Reception ==
Armando Padron of The Highway Herald called "Netflix Trip" one of the album's best songs, praising its spirit as a coming-of-age story. Ashley Amber of Collider complimented the song's attachment to characters such as Michael Scott and Dwight Schrute without ever directly mentioning The Office. Jason Scott of Pop Dust called the track "an unlikely emotional wallop" and commended its intense reminiscing, while Austin Bessey of Too Good Music described "Netflix Trip" as AJR's "most unique song". Talia Davis of The Breeze retrospectively compared Ryan's songwriting on the song to the track "Don't Throw Out My Legos" from Neotheater (2019), appreciating his focus on nostalgia and development in maturity. When performing "Netflix Trip", AJR ends the song with a cover of The Office's theme music. Elyse Lijoi of Stars and Scars lauded the live rendition, likening it to an anthemic march.

Fans on Twitter criticized "Netflix Trip" after its release, noting that its beginning composition closely resembled Jon Bellion's song "Human" from his 2014 mixtape The Definition. AJR responded to this with a statement claiming that their song had been written years before "Human" released, and stated that they had never heard the track before completing "Netflix Trip". The band ignored individual fan inquiries about the two songs to avoid starting "something crazy and irrational", while bassist Adam Met noted that it would've required copying "seven notes in a row of the same intervals" to legally count as plagiarism. AJR additionally explained that the similarity in verse melody was an unintentional result of having the same influences as Bellion, such as Kanye West.

== Personnel ==
Credits adapted from the album's liner notes.

- Adam Met – bass guitar, backing vocals
- Jack Met – lead vocals, melodica, percussion, ukulele, guitar
- Ryan Met – lead vocals, keyboards, trumpet, ukulele, production, programming, audio mixing
- Chris Gehringer – mastering engineer
- Alicia Svigals – violin
- Jake Kenowitz – trumpet
