= Weak (AJR song) =

2016 single by AJR

Single by AJR

from the EP What Everyone's Thinking and the album The Click
- A-side: "I'm Not Famous"
- Released: September 16, 2016
- Recorded: 2016
- Genre: Indie pop; electropop
- Length: 3:21
- Label: AJR Productions; S-Curve; Ultra; Black Butter
- Songwriters: Adam Met; Jack Met; Ryan Met
- Producer: Ryan Met

AJR singles chronology
"I'm Not Famous" (2016)	"Weak" (2016)	"It's On Us" (2017)

Music video
- "Weak" on YouTube "Weak" (Lyric Video) on YouTube

"Weak" is a song by American indie pop band AJR. It was first released on their EP What Everyone's Thinking via the band's label AJR Productions on September 16, 2016, later becoming the third single for their second studio album The Click (2017). The song's lyrics describe acceptance of human weakness and feature an uptempo pop composition. A lyric and music video were released, with the latter featuring the band in a New York City subway. The music video went viral, with the song's popularity on Spotify helping the song become one of the band's highest-charting songs.

"Weak" has seven official remixes and several live recordings available on streaming platforms, and has been performed live numerous times. The song charted in 17 countries, reaching the top five in the Netherlands and the top 10 in Belgium and Norway. This success attracted the attention of Barack Obama, Rivers Cuomo, and Steve Aoki, who would all individually collaborate with AJR later.

== Background and composition ==
The band wrote the song's lyrics in a day while taking inspiration from Fun's Aim and Ignite and Twenty One Pilots' music, saying they liked "quirky, sometimes dark, insightful lyrics set to a really anthemic beat". The first verse of the song describes the feeling right before a party starts at night, with the band stating "you don't know that it could be generally bad for you but that moment before you do is the greatest feeling in the world and you can't say no to it". The pre-chorus continues with this theme, with Jack's girlfriend Alba Avoricani singing lines that mimic temptation with Jack expressing conflicting emotions. Band members Jack and Ryan Met portray this based on real-life personal experiences, with colleagues interrupting the personal time of the band members to party instead. The chorus of the song accepts the temptation built up in the verse, valuing giving in to it while also presenting moderation of it. The chorus' ending vocalization is inspired by harmonization typical to The Beach Boys with hip-hop production inspired by Kanye West. The bridge of the song uses "spokestep", a term the band created to refer to vocals that are heavily edited in the style of dubstep. AJR described radio songs of the time as having "people kind of messing up vocals", with the band taking inspiration and trying to "take that to the next level". Spokestep was used in the band's preceding album Living Room (2015) and further appeared on The Click (2017).

"Weak"
A 24-second sample of "Weak" by AJR, where the pre-chorus and chorus are heard.

In a July 2017 interview, the band spoke about their inspiration for the song. Jack and Ryan explained that while attending a concert in The Bitter End in New York City, Ryan went to the restroom and saw a sticker that read "The Weaklings", the name of a local band. The band took inspiration from this, calling it "a very AJR'ish thing to say" and using its self-deprecating tones to create the chorus lyrics "I should stay strong, but I'm weak". The lyrics that originally followed this were "and I fell for that... I should've stayed away from that", but AJR's manager Steve Greenberg encouraged the band to change the lyric to "and what's wrong with that... I love it when I fall for that". In interviews, band member Adam Met has described the song's writing as an intentional opposite to motivational and empowering songs, stating that "it's okay to be human". The song was included as the second single of the band's 2016 extended-play, What Everyone's Thinking, with "Weak" later appearing as the second single of AJR's second studio album, The Click (2017).

=== Production ===
The song was freely produced in AJR's living room, with the band emphasizing being "not inhibited by studio costs and other writers and producers". During their OK Orchestra tour and other 2022 shows, AJR showcased the layers of the song. The song's production began with a kick, snare, and reversed hi-hat for drums, an "epic and inspirational" bassline, and piano in 4/4 time signature in the key of F major. In the early stages of production, the song had a tempo of 100 beats per minute, with the band later slowing it down to the final tempo of 62 beats per minute. After this, the snare was replaced with a hip hop snare, and the band took inspiration from films such as The Empire Strikes Back to compose an "epic and inspirational" trumpet melody. This was re-performed on a hi-hat and production ended with the band sampling a digitally pitch-bended baby cry for a chorus melody.

== Music videos ==
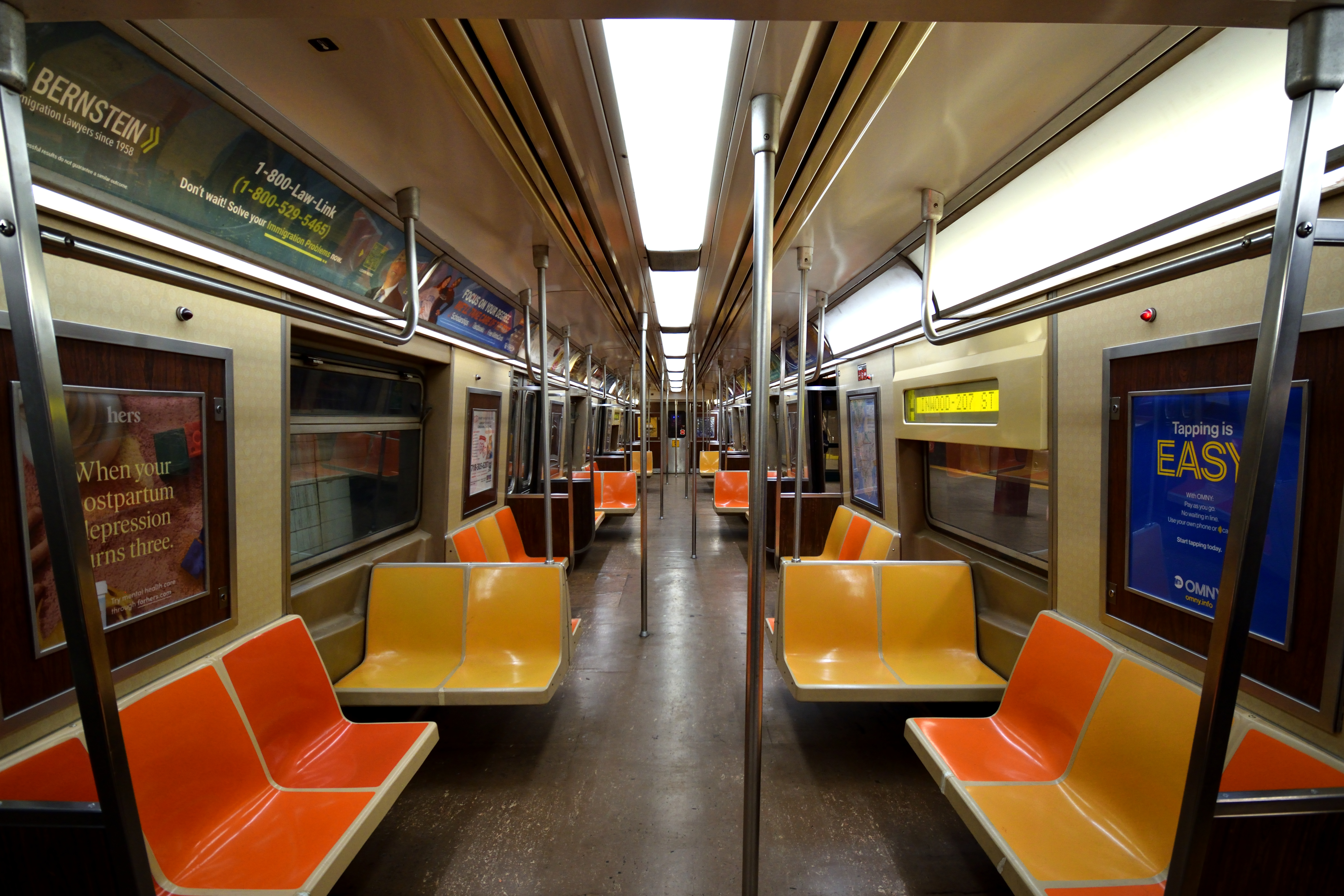
New York subway car #5898, the primary filming location of the music video for "Weak"

Following the release of What Everyone's Thinking on September 16, 2016, a lyric video for "Weak" was released in late October, featuring drawings of the lyrics and the band performing the song on an Etch A Sketch. After becoming the second single of The Click (2017), a music video for the song was directed by Shane Drake and released on March 9, 2017. The video depicts the group unconscious on a train with Jack Met waking up and struggling to traverse and leave. As he does so, Ryan and Adam glitch behind him while performing the song. Jack walks through several cars continuously following a white light, additionally trying to get the attention of bystanders after an unsuccessful attempt of escape. Jack falls as the lights turn red during the song's bridge, later getting up during the final chorus to reach the light. At the end of the video, he discovers its source as the headlight of a train and suddenly finds himself standing directly on the train track before being struck. When interviewed, Jack described the light as a representation of vice, with it being "so blinding and enticing" that he gives into it before "pay[ing] the price".

Setup for the video in the New York Transit Museum began at 6 PM and filming began at 8 PM. The video's final scene was shot first, using a green screen and moving lights to simulate a train moving towards Jack. Filming inside the train began at 9:30 PM and ended at 8 AM. The video was filmed using Sony equipment, with Ryan wearing Sony headphones in the music video. A large production crew was present, which the band noted as a contrast to their previously produced music videos with lower budgets.

== Commercial performance ==
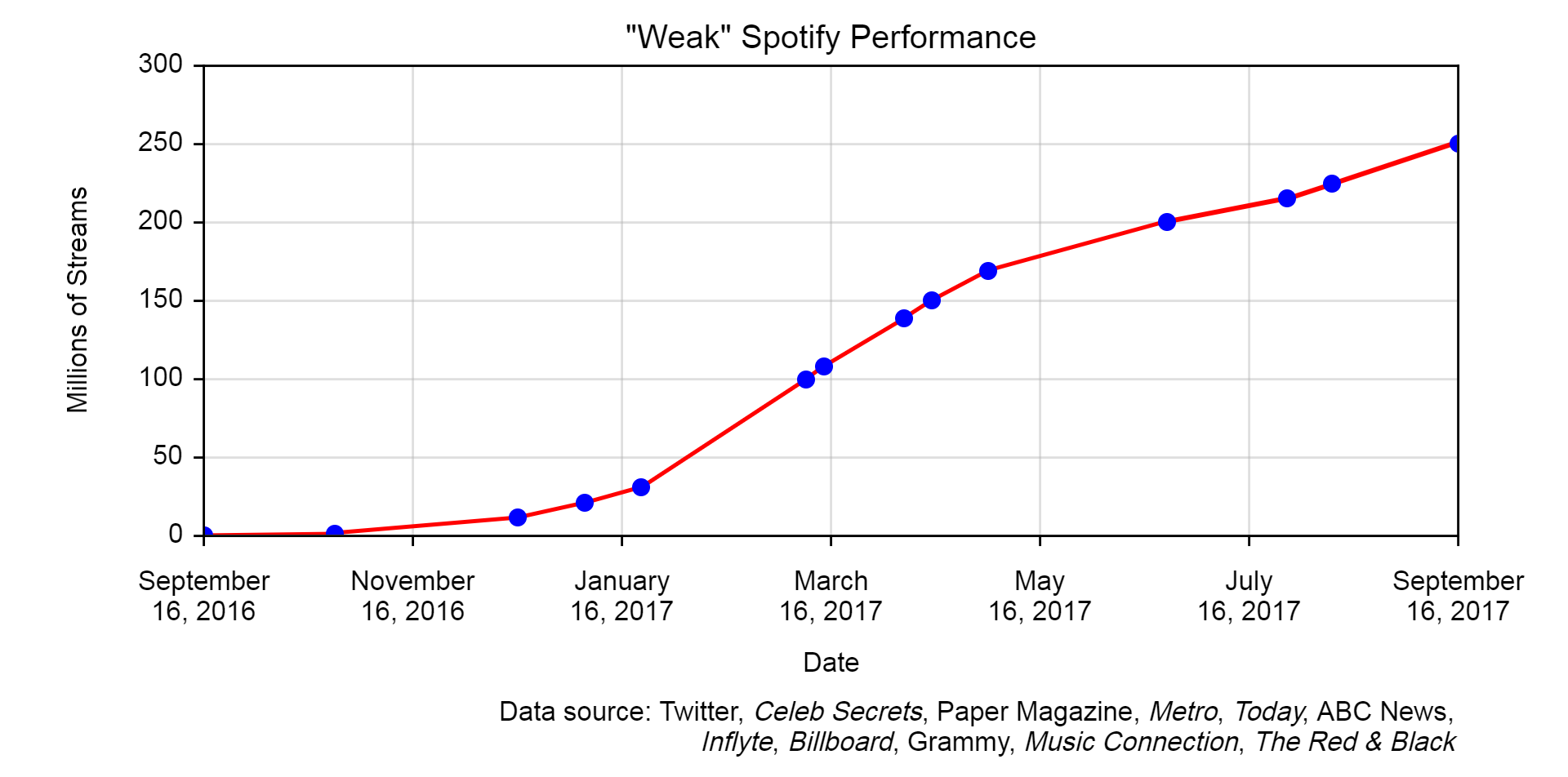
Spotify streaming performance of "Weak" within its first year of release.

"Weak" was AJR's second song to reach the Billboard Hot 100, preceded by "I'm Ready". Charting in 17 countries, the band has attributed the song's global success to Spotify's algorithms. The song's growth was a "very, very slow process", with the band recalling its streaming count updating by thousands per day initially.

Between September 2016 and January 2017, "Weak" amassed 30 million streams, amassing 70 million more streams in the next two months. While climbing Billboard charts, the band released the music video for "Weak" in March, further pushing the song onto the Hot 100. Metro named AJR their artist of the day on March 13, 2017. After performing the song on Today in April, the song was released to the radio for airplay and charted further. "Weak" accumulated more than 250 million streams after a year of its release, with Apple Music including "Weak" on its "Best Alt Songs of the 2010s" playlist.

While "Weak" was charting, Barack Obama listened to the song via Spotify, which prompted his administration to ask AJR to write a song for the It's On Us campaign. AJR then wrote a song of the same name, which released as the band's next single after "Weak" on March 31, 2017. Rivers Cuomo, frontman of rock band Weezer, additionally reached out to AJR via Twitter, which resulted in a collaboration between the two to produce the song "Sober Up". The song "Pretender" later released in 2018 as a collaboration between Steve Aoki, Lil Yachty, and AJR, which the latter cites as another result of the success of "Weak".

== Remixes ==
After the high commercial performance of "Weak", English singer-songwriter Louisa Johnson contacted the band, asking to make a version with her vocals replacing Avoricani's. The band accepted due to their familiarity with her work with Clean Bandit and released "Weak (Stay Strong Mix)" through Black Butter Records on April 28, 2017. The mix features engineering from Kevin Tuffy, Joe Kearns, and Jay Reynolds. It additionally charted on Tophit's Russia Airplay chart, peaking at number 6. In advance of The Click (2017), AJR released Weak Remixes EP on May 5, 2017, an EP consisting of five remixes and an acoustic version of "Weak". In late 2022, Nicolas Julian posted a techno remix of "Weak" on TikTok, receiving thousands of re-uses in the platform before an official release through AJR as "Weak (Nicolas Julian Remix)" in 2023.

== Live performances ==
"Weak" has appeared on many of AJR's setlists, first appearing during the band's 2016 What Everyone's Thinking tour and again in the 2017 and 2018 legs of their The Click tour. Additional performances in 2018 included iHeartRadio's ALTerEgo, WRFF's Xfinity Live, WQFM's Snow Show, Sun Broadcast Group's Upfront Event, and WINS-FM's Not So Silent Night. The song was further performed in 2019, including on Jimmy Kimmel Live!, BottleRock Napa Valley, KXTE's Our Big Concert, Bonnaroo Music Festival, WKQX's Piqniq, the San Diego County Fair, Firefly Music Festival, LoveLoud Fest, L.L.Bean's Summer Concert Series, Lollapalooza, the Great American Ball Park, the Eastern States Exposition, and iHeartRadio's Jingle Ball, while also appearing in Neotheater World Tour shows.

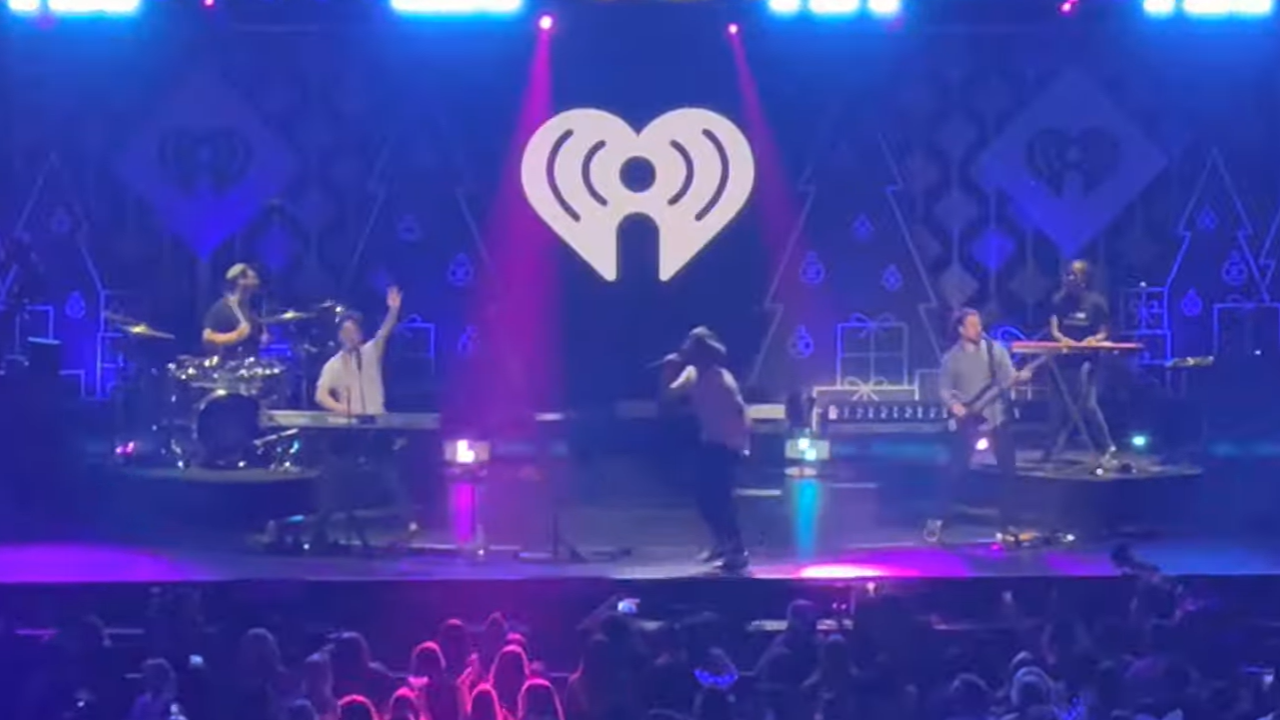
AJR performing at iHeartRadio's Jingle Ball in 2021.

Concerts in 2020 were limited due to COVID-19, with the band performing at SeaWorld's Seven Seas Food Festival and some shows from the Neotheater World Tour before the pandemic. Four concerts were performed later in the year: two at Live Nation's drive-in concert series, one during UScellular's acoustic livestream, and as part of the band's One Spectacular Night. Performances in 2021 included SUNYFest, Saturday in the Park, WonderStruck festival, Wonderbus Music & Arts Festival, the New York State Fair, the Great Allentown Fair, Music Midtown, WSUN's Next Big Thing, Audacy Beach Festival, and six times for iHeartRadio's Jingle Ball. Performances in 2022 included the Monument Circle, SunFest, Festival d'été de Québec, the Union Peak Festival, four times for iHeartRadio's Jingle Ball, and shows across AJR's OK Orchestra tour.

The band continued performing with "Weak" in setlists throughout 2023, such as the Beale Street Music Festival, a Tampa Bay Rays game, the Hangout Music Festival, the Greenroom Festival, the Seoul Jazz Festival, the Orange County Fair, Musikfest, the Sziget Festival, the FM4 Frequency Festival, Lollapalooza Germany, SEMA Fest, and twice for iHeartRadio's Jingle Ball.

== Track listings ==
Digital download

1. "Weak" – 3:21

US vinyl single

1. "I'm Not Famous" – 3:41
2. "Weak" – 3:21

Weak Remixes EP

1. "Weak" (Mike D Remix) – 3:20
2. "Weak" (Mike Rizzo Remix) – 3:25
3. "Weak" (Cheat Codes Remix) – 2:57
4. "Weak" (Party Pupils Remix) – 3:34
5. "Weak" (Gazzo Remix) – 3:36
6. "Weak" (Acoustic) – 3:14

== Personnel ==
Credits adapted from the album's liner notes.

AJR

- Adam Met – bass guitar, backing vocals
- Jack Met – lead vocals, instruments
- Ryan Met – instruments, composer, production, programming

Technical

- Chris Gehringer – mastering engineer
- Joe Zook – mixing engineer
- John Sinclair – mixing engineer (Note: Vinyl single only)
- Kevin Tuffy – mastering engineer (Note: "Weak (Stay Strong Mix)" only)
- Joe Kearns – recording engineer
- Jay Reynolds – mixing engineer, production

Additional musicians

- Alba Avoricani – guest vocals
- Louisa Johnson – guest vocals
- Mike D – remixer (Note: Weak Remixes EP only)
- Mike Rizzo – remixer
- Cheat Codes – remixer
- Party Pupils – remixer
- Gazzo – remixer
- Nicolas Julian – remixer (Note: "Weak (Nicolas Julian Remix)" only)

== Charts ==
=== Weekly charts ===
Weekly chart performance for "Weak"
Chart (2016–17)	Peak position
Austria (Ö3 Austria Top 40)	37
Belarus Airplay (Eurofest)	4
Belgium (Ultratop 50 Flanders)	7
Belgium (Ultratop 50 Wallonia)	33
Canada Hot 100 (Billboard)	78
Czech Republic Airplay (ČNS IFPI)	11
Czech Republic Singles Digital (ČNS IFPI)	36
Denmark (Tracklisten)	37
Finland Airplay (Radiosoittolista)	39
Finnish Streaming (Musiikkituottajat)	40
Germany (GfK)	39
Ireland (IRMA)	29
Italy (FIMI)	62
Netherlands (Dutch Top 40)	5
Netherlands (Single Top 100)	8
Norway (VG-lista)	8
Portugal (AFP)	38
Scottish Singles Sales (Official Charts)	86
Slovakia Airplay (ČNS IFPI)	52
Slovakia Singles Digital (ČNS IFPI)	26
Sweden (Sverigetopplistan)	23
Switzerland (Schweizer Hitparade)	62
UK Singles (Official Charts)	58
US Billboard Hot 100	73
US Dance Club Songs (Billboard)	8
US Pop Airplay (Billboard)	27

=== Year-end charts ===
Year-end chart performance for "Weak"
Chart (2017)	Position
Belgium (Ultratop Flanders)	11
Belgium (Ultratop Wallonia)	93
Netherlands (Dutch Top 40)	20
Netherlands (Single Top 100)	25

== Certifications ==
Certifications for "Weak"
Region	Certification	Certified units/sales
Australia (ARIA)	Platinum	70,000^{‡}
Austria (IFPI Austria)	Gold	15,000^{‡}
Belgium (BRMA)	Platinum	20,000^{‡}
Canada (Music Canada)	2× Platinum	160,000^{‡}
Denmark (IFPI Danmark)	Gold	45,000^{‡}
France (SNEP)	Gold	100,000^{‡}
Germany (BVMI)	Platinum	400,000^{‡}
Italy (FIMI)	Gold	25,000^{‡}
Netherlands (NVPI)	Platinum	40,000^{‡}
New Zealand (RMNZ)	Platinum	30,000^{‡}
Poland (ZPAV)	Gold	25,000^{‡}
Switzerland (IFPI Switzerland)	Gold	15,000^{‡}
United Kingdom (BPI)	Gold	400,000^{‡}
United States (RIAA)	4× Platinum	4,000,000^{‡}
^{‡} Sales+streaming figures based on certification alone.

== Release history ==
Release dates and formats for "Weak"
Region	Date	Format(s)	Label	Ref.
Various	September 16, 2016	Digital download; streaming	AJR	
United States	October 7, 2016	7-inch	BMG	
United States	April 4, 2017	Radio airplay	BMG	

== See also ==
- List of UK Independent Singles Breakers Chart number ones of the 2010s
