= Adam Met =

American musician, activist, author and academic

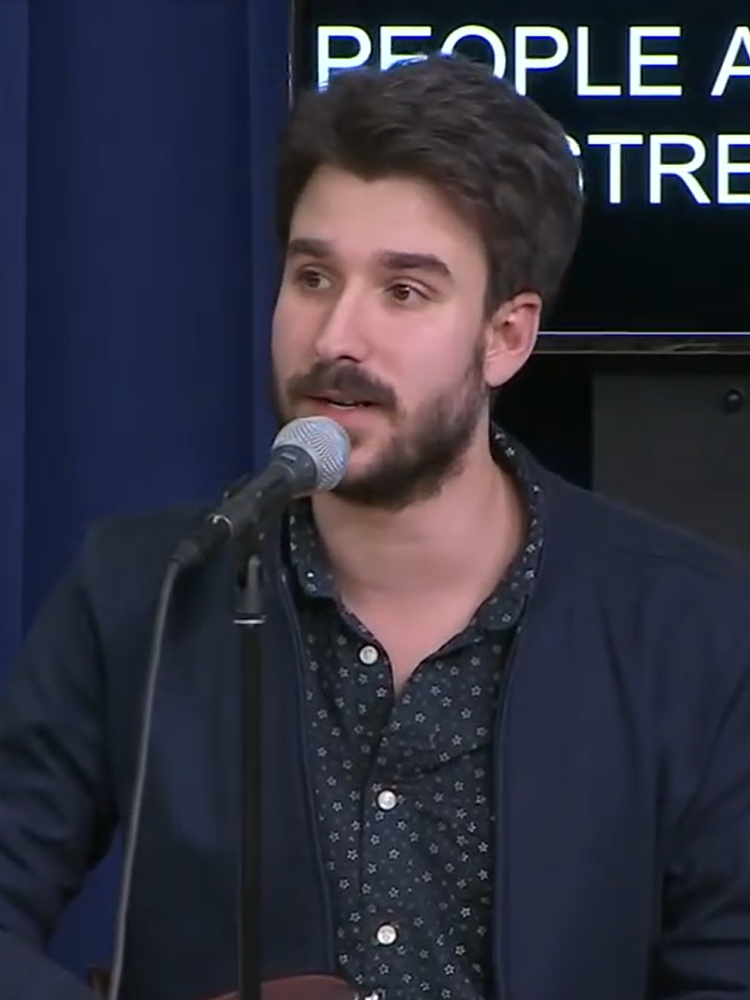
- Met in 2017
- Born: Adam Brett Metzger; August 27, 1990 (age 36); Bayside, Queens, New York, United States
- Education: Columbia University; New York University; University of Birmingham
- Years active: 2005–present
- Musical career
- Genre: Pop
- Instruments: Bass guitar; vocals; percussion
- Labels: AJR Productions; Mercury; Republic; Black Butter; Sony; Warner; S-Curve; BMG
- Member of: AJR
- Website: www.adammet.net

Adam Brett Met (né Metzger, born August 27, 1990) is an American musician, academic, and climate activist. He is known as the bassist and a background vocalist of the indie-pop band AJR. Met is an adjunct professor at Columbia University.

== Early life and education ==
Met was born on August 27, 1990, in New York City. He attended Columbia University, where he earned a Bachelor of Arts in Business and Philosophy in 2012. He later obtained a Master's degree from New York University. In 2021, he completed his Ph.D. in International Human Rights Law from the University of Birmingham.

== Music career ==
In 2005, Met co-founded the indie pop band AJR with his brothers Jack and Ryan while living in Chelsea, Manhattan. The trio began performing live in 2006 by busking in Central Park and Washington Square Park in New York City. The group released songs such as "I'm Ready", "Weak", and "Bang!". AJR has released albums such as The Click (2017) and OK Orchestra (2021). Their 2018 song "Burn the House Down" became associated with the March for Our Lives movement.

In 2017, Met and his brothers released the charity single "It's On Us", supporting the "It's On Us" campaign created by Barack Obama and the White House Council on Women and Girls to raise awareness about sexual assault on college campuses. On January 17, 2021, AJR performed at the Biden-Harris pre-inauguration We the People virtual concert alongside other artists.

== Climate activism and policy ==
In 2018, Met founded Planet Reimagined, a non-profit focused on renewable energy policies, sustainable music touring, and youth climate advocacy. During the development of the Inflation Reduction Act, Met worked with policymakers on reaching bipartisan clean energy policies.

Met participated in the Social Good Summit in 2019, where he spoke about sustainability in the entertainment industry. He also collaborated with the United Nations Development Programme (UNDP) on sustainability projects.

In 2023, Met became an adjunct professor at Columbia University, where he teaches courses on sustainability and climate policy. He has written articles on climate campaigning and human rights for outlets such as TIME and Rolling Stone.

Met was included in the Time 100 "Climate list" and received the "Earth Award" at the TIME100 Next Gala for his environmental work in 2024. He was also recognized as a Changemaker by The New York Times in 2024 for his work in climate advocacy.

== Author career ==
=== Amplify ===
Amplify is a 2025 nonfiction book by Met, co-written with award-winning journalist Heather Landy. Published on June 3, 2025, the book draws on Met's firsthand experience growing AJR's audience from playing in living rooms to selling out arenas, adapting those fan-building strategies to the realm of social movements.

=== Amplify Book Tour ===
Following the book's release in early June, Met embarked on an eight‑city "Amplify Book Tour", comprising intimate events that blend literary discussion, musical performance, and practical activist strategy. Tour stops included:

- New York City: June 2, 2025
- Washington, D.C.: June 4, 2025
- Salt Lake City: June 5, 2025
- Boulder: June 6, 2025
- Seattle: June 8, 2025
- San Francisco: June 9, 2025
- Boston: June 13, 2025
- Chicago: June 18, 2025

== Personal life ==
Met, as well as his two brothers, is Jewish, describing himself as "culturally Jewish but not observant". His parents divorced while he was a child. His father was Gary Metzger, an architect who died in July 2023.

Met and his brothers grew up in Bayside, Queens, until moving to Chelsea, Manhattan, in 2001.
