= I'm Not Famous =

2016 single by AJR

Single by AJR

from the EP What Everyone's Thinking and the album The Click
- B-side: "Weak"
- Released: March 25, 2016
- Genre: Indie pop
- Length: 3:40
- Label: AJR Productions; BMG (US); Black Butter (Sony Music, worldwide)
- Songwriters: Adam Met; Jack Met; Ryan Met
- Producer: Ryan Met

AJR singles chronology
"Call My Dad" (2015)	"I'm Not Famous" (2016)	"Weak" (2016)

Music video
- "I'm Not Famous" on YouTube

Trick Shot music video
- "I'm Not Famous" on YouTube

"I'm Not Famous" is a song by American indie pop band AJR. It was released as the lead single of their fourth EP What Everyone's Thinking via the band's label AJR Productions on March 25, 2016. It would later appear as the tenth track on their second studio album The Click (2017). The song lyrically takes pride in not being famous, listing positives while using upbeat pop instruments. Two music videos were released for the song.

== Background and composition ==
After the success of their single "I'm Ready" and their debut studio album Living Room (2015), AJR received various fan questions about being famous. The band would reply with "we're not famous", which inspired them to develop the song concept of "I'm Not Famous". The song aims to weaken society's obsession with fame, commentating on it to have listeners think less positively of it.

"I'm Not Famous" was released on March 25, 2016, as the lead single of What Everyone's Thinking. The song utilizes elements of jazz while maintaining the band's standard indie pop sound. It additionally uses a V–vi–IV–I chord progression in the key of F major.

== Music videos ==
A video for "I'm Not Famous" was directed and edited by AJR, and released on April 25, 2016. The video primarily takes place in the streets of New York City, with lead singer Jack Met publicly traversing the city in a onesie to prove that he's not famous. The video was filmed with a budget of $100, using a local YouTube Space to film some scenes. Another video for "I'm Not Famous" featuring Legendary Shots was released on September 6, 2016, with the band performing in front of various stunts.

== Commercial performance ==
"I'm Not Famous" placed at number 25 on SiriusXM's Weekend Countdown for the week of August 27, 2016. The song had little streaming success upon release, amassing 1.6 million plays on Spotify within its first six months of release. It received higher commercial performance after the band released "Weak", with the success of the single echoing onto "I'm Not Famous".

== Track listings ==
Digital download

1. "I'm Not Famous" – 3:40

US vinyl single

1. "I'm Not Famous" – 3:40
2. "Weak" – 3:21

== Personnel ==
Credits adapted from the album's liner notes.

- Adam Met – bass guitar, backing vocals, composer
- Jack Met – lead vocals, guitar, melodica, percussion, ukulele, composer
- Ryan Met – backing vocals, keyboards, trumpet, ukulele, composer, producer
- Chris Gehringer – mastering engineer
- Delbert Bowers – audio mixing

== Release history ==
Release dates and formats for "I'm Not Famous"
Region	Date	Format(s)	Label	Ref.
Various	March 25, 2016	Digital download; streaming	AJR	
United States	June 2016	Radio airplay	BMG	
United States	October 7, 2016	7-inch	BMG	
