= Grizfolk =

Swedish-American alternative rock band

- Origin: Los Angeles, California
- Genres: Alternative rock, indie pop
- Years active: 2012–present
- Labels: Virgin, Nettwerk
- Members: Adam Roth; Bill Delia; Ryan Williams
- Past members: Brendan Willing James; Sebastian Fritze; Fredrik Eriksson

Grizfolk is an American alternative rock band consisting of Adam Roth (lead vocals, guitar), Bill Delia (drums), and Ryan Williams (bass). Based in Nashville, Grizfolk released their debut EP, From the Spark, in February 2014. Their debut full-length studio album, Waking Up the Giants, was released January 8, 2016.

== History ==
=== Formation ===
Grizfolk formed in Los Angeles when Swedish producers Fredrik Eriksson and Sebastian Fritze met singer-songwriter Adam Roth in 2012, who were joined by Brendan Willing James and Bill Delia later that year. Initially, the group was called Griz Adams, but they quickly changed their name to Grizfolk after their demo for the song "The Struggle" went viral on the Internet, "something that better reflected what's supported us", Fritze explained.

=== Early career ===
In October 2013, Grizfolk performed an in-studio performance for KCRW's Morning Becomes Eclectic. The Santa Monica-based station also championed Grizfolk as an "Artist You Should Know". The next day, they performed at KCRW's annual Masquerade Ball alongside Glasser, Dale Earnhardt Jr. Jr., Dave Sitek and more. In early 2014, their song "Way Back When" was featured on the soundtrack of the comic science fiction movie Mr. Peabody & Sherman.

=== From the Spark EP ===
Signed to Virgin Records in the fall of 2013, Grizfolk released their debut EP, From the Spark, in February 2014, including their single "The Struggle". It was followed by the band's first modern rock single, "Hymnals". Remix veteran RAC also released his version of "Hymnals", which rose to No. 1 on The Hype Machine. Other From the Spark remixes were released by Saint Pepsi, Tyde and Dawn Golden.

Media appearances

The group has done live performances on Late Show with David Letterman, Conan O'Brien, newspapers and a number of radio shows.

New releases

"In My Arms", June 2017 (Spotify, iTunes)

"Mercy", April 2019

== Discography ==
=== Studio albums ===
==== Waking Up the Giants (January 2016) ====
CD, LP, digital download, streaming
No.	Title	Length
1.	"Into the Barrens"	3:16
2.	"Troublemaker"	3:29
3.	"Hymnals"	3:14
4.	"The Struggle"	3:33
5.	"Bob Marley"	3:36
6.	"Waking Up the Giants"	3:54
7.	"Waiting for You"	3:57
8.	"Vagabonds"	3:19
9.	"Bounty on My Head"	3:36
10.	"Cosmic Angel"	3:22
11.	"Bohemian Bird"	3:42
12.	"Wide Awake"	3:14

==== Rarest of Birds (July 2019) ====
CD, LP, digital download, streaming
No.	Title	Length
1.	"Heavy Crown"	3:34
2.	"Spoonful"	3:09
3.	"Black Magic"	2:47
4.	"Mercy"	3:23
5.	"Believing"	3:18
6.	"Carmen Sandiego"	3:37
7.	"Shaky in the Knees"	3:29
8.	"Daylight"	3:05
9.	"Pretty Penny"	3:34
10.	"Interlude"	0:24
11.	"Hurricane"	2:54
12.	"Rarest of Birds"	3:44

Grizfolk (July 2021)

CD, LP, digital download, streaming
No.	Title	Length
1.	"Fumes"	4:02
2.	"Be My Yoko"	3:10
3.	"California High"	3:12
4.	"Now That I Know"	2:43
5.	"Gone"	3:02
6.	"The Ripple"	3:24
7.	"Money"	2:50
8.	"Queen of the Desert"	2:35
9.	"Howlin"	4:02
10.	"Stargazer"	2:31

=== EPs ===
==== Indian Summer sampler (July 2013) ====
Digital only
No.	Title	Length
1.	"The Struggle"	3:35
2.	"Vagabonds" (ft. Nikola Bedingfield)	3:19
3.	"Hymnals"	3:05

==== From the Spark (2014) ====
First press (February 2014)
No.	Title	Length
1.	"Hymnals"	3:15
2.	"The Struggle"	3:33
3.	"Vagabonds"	3:18
4.	"Waiting for You"	3:58

Re-issue (August 2014)
No.	Title	Length
1.	"Hymnals" (Reworked version)	3:15
2.	"The Struggle"	3:33
3.	"Vagabonds"	3:18
4.	"Waiting for You"	3:58
5.	"Cosmic Angel" (Live from Capitol Studios)	4:16

==== From the Road (December 2014) ====
Digital only, Live
No.	Title	Length
1.	"Waiting for You"	4:05
2.	"Cosmic Angel"	3:19
3.	"Bounty on My Head"	3:47
4.	"Hymnals"	4:05

Sign of the Times (March 2024)

Digital download, streaming
No.	Title	Length
1.	"Sign of the Times"	3:15
2.	"Paper Cranes"	3:28
3.	"Decoy"	3:18
4.	"Medicine Man"	2:15
5.	"Gold"	2:52

Way On Out (October 2024)

Digital download, streaming
No.	Title	Length
1.	"Further"	2:54
2.	"Calm Surrender"	3:38
3.	"Meteorite"	3:42
4.	"Way On Out"	2:20
5.	"Fade On You"	4:08

=== Singles ===
- "The Struggle" (October 2012)
- "The Struggle" (December 2013)
- "Hymnals" (2014)
- "Way Back When" (2:47) (from Mr. Peabody & Sherman) (2014)
- "Troublemaker" (3:29) / "Wide Awake" (from Waking Up The Giants) (2015) [#33 Alternative Songs]
- "Endless Summer" (2018)
- "Shaky in the Knees" (2018)
- "Spoonful" (2019)
- "Heavy Crown" (2019)
- "Mercy" (2019)
- "Money" (2020)
- "Queen of the Desert" (2020)
- "All I Want for Christmas is a Rock Show (feat. Kyle Gass)" (2020)
- "California High" (2021)
- "The Ripple" (2021)
- "Fumes" (2021)

=== Remixes ===
- "Hymnals" (RAC Mix)
- "Hymnals" (Saint Pepsi Remix)
- "The Struggle" (RAC Mix)
- "The Struggle" (Dawn Golden Remix)
- "Vagabonds" (Tyde Remix)

== Touring ==
Grizfolk supported label mates Bastille on their European and U.S. tours in spring and fall of 2014 respectively, including two sold-out shows at Radio City Music Hall in New York City. Grizfolk has also toured with several other artists on the alternative circuit, including Haim and Wild Cub.

In early 2015, it was announced that the band would perform at the Boston Calling Music Festival in May 2015; a few weeks following the initial announcement the act withdrew from the festival.

=== The Black Bear Tour (August 2013) ===
The Black Bear Tour (August 2013)
Date	City	Country	Venue	Support
August 21, 2013	San Diego	United States	The Casbah	Supporting Andrew Belle
August 22, 2013	Los Angeles	United States	Bootleg Theater	Supporting Andrew Belle
August 24, 2013	San Francisco	United States	Brick & Mortar Music Hall	Supporting Andrew Belle
August 25, 2013	Sacramento	United States	Harlow's	Supporting Andrew Belle
August 27, 2013	Portland	United States	Mississippi Studios	Supporting Andrew Belle
August 28, 2013	Seattle	United States	The Tractor Tavern	Supporting Andrew Belle

=== Smoke and Mirrors Tour (November 2013) ===
Smoke and Mirrors Tour (November 2013)
Date	City	Country	Venue	Support
November 15, 2013	Solana Beach	United States	The Belly Up Tavern	Supporting Brett Dennen
November 16, 2013	Los Angeles	United States	Troubadour	Supporting Brett Dennen
November 17, 2013	Santa Cruz	United States	Rio Theater	Supporting Brett Dennen
November 18, 2013	San Francisco	United States	The Independent	Supporting Brett Dennen
November 20, 2013	Boise	United States	Egyptian Theater	Supporting Brett Dennen
November 21, 2013	Bend	United States	Domino Room	Supporting Brett Dennen
November 22, 2013	Portland	United States	Aladdin Theater	Supporting Brett Dennen
November 23, 2013	Seattle	United States	The Triple Door	Supporting Brett Dennen

=== The Good, the Bad Blood and the Ugly Tour (December 2013 – January 2014) ===
The Good, the Bad Blood and the Ugly Tour (December 2013 – January 2014)
Date	City	Country	Venue	Support
December 1, 2013	Broomfield	United States	1st Bank Center	Supporting Bastille
December 2, 2013	Salt Lake City	United States	The Complex	Supporting Bastille
December 7, 2013	Oakland	United States	Oracle Arena	Supporting Bastille
December 8, 2013	Los Angeles	United States	Shrine Auditorium	Supporting Bastille
December 9, 2013	Portland	United States	Crystal Ballroom	Supporting Bastille
December 11, 2013	Omaha	United States	Sokol Auditorium	Supporting Bastille
December 12, 2013	Milwaukee	United States	Eagles Ballroom	Supporting Bastille
December 13, 2013	St. Louis	United States	The Pageant	Supporting Bastille
December 14, 2013	Kansas City	United States	Arvest Bank Theatre	Supporting Bastille
December 16, 2013	Lansing	United States	The Loft	Supporting Bastille
January 19, 2014	Royal Oak	United States	Royal Oak Music Theatre	Supporting Bastille
January 20, 2014	Boston	United States	The Royale	Supporting Bastille
January 22, 2014	New York City	United States	Webster Hall	Supporting Bastille

=== Last Love Tour (February – March 2014) ===
Last Love Tour (February – March 2014)
Date	City	Country	Venue	Support
February 28, 2014	Philadelphia	United States	Theatre of Living Arts	Supporting ZZ Ward
March 1, 2014	Baltimore	United States	Rams Head Live!	Supporting ZZ Ward
March 2, 2014	Boston	United States	Paradise Rock Club	Supporting ZZ Ward
March 4, 2014	Norfolk	United States	NorVa	Supporting ZZ Ward
March 5, 2014	Charlotte	United States	Visulite	Supporting ZZ Ward
March 6, 2014	Charleston	United States	Music Farm	Supporting ZZ Ward
March 7, 2014	Orlando	United States	The Social	Supporting ZZ Ward

=== Bad Blood Part III Tour (March 2014) ===
Bad Blood Part III Tour (March 2014)
Date	City	Country	Venue	Support
March 10, 2014	Paris	France	Casino de Paris	Supporting Bastille
March 11, 2014	Antwerp	Belgium	Lotto Arena	Supporting Bastille
March 12, 2014	Amsterdam	Netherlands	Heineken Music Hall	Supporting Bastille
March 14, 2014	Cologne	Germany	Palladium	Supporting Bastille
March 15, 2014	Oberhausen	Germany	Turbinenhalle	Supporting Bastille
March 16, 2014	Bremen	Germany	Pier2	Supporting Bastille
March 18, 2014	Prague	Czech Republic	SaSaZu	Supporting Bastille
March 19, 2014	Leipzig	Germany	Haus Auensee	Supporting Bastille
March 20, 2014	Berlin	Germany	Columbiahalle	Supporting Bastille
March 22, 2014	Milan	Italy	Mediolanum Forum	Supporting Bastille
March 23, 2014	Lausanne	Switzerland	Odyssée	Supporting Bastille

=== Wild Cub Fall Tour (July – August 2014) ===
Wild Cub Fall Tour (July – August 2014)
Date	City	Country	Venue	Support
July 14, 2014	Kansas City	United States	Czar Bar	Supporting Wild Cub
July 16, 2014	St. Louis	United States	Duck Room @ Blueberry Hill	Supporting Wild Cub
July 25, 2014	Austin	United States	The Parish	Supporting Wild Cub
July 26, 2014	Houston	United States	Fitzgerald's (Downstairs)	Supporting Wild Cub
July 28, 2014	Colorado Springs	United States	The Black Sheep	Supporting Wild Cub
July 29, 2014	Denver	United States	Larimer Lounge	Supporting Wild Cub
August 6, 2014	Los Angeles	United States	El Rey	Supporting Wild Cub
August 7, 2014	San Francisco	United States	Great American Music Hall	Supporting Wild Cub

=== Bad Blood: The Last Stand Tour (October 2014) ===
Bad Blood: The Last Stand Tour (October 2014)
Date	City	Country	Venue	Support
October 9, 2014	New York City	United States	Radio City Music Hall	Supporting Bastille
October 10, 2014	New York City	United States	Radio City Music Hall	Supporting Bastille
October 11, 2014	Fairfax	United States	Patriot Center	Supporting Bastille
October 13, 2014	Boston	United States	Agganis Arena	Supporting Bastille
October 14, 2014	Montreal	Canada	Bell Centre	Supporting Bastille
October 15, 2014	Toronto	Canada	Air Canada Centre	Supporting Bastille
October 17, 2014	Cincinnati	United States	U.S. Bank Arena	Supporting Bastille
October 18, 2014	Milwaukee	United States	Milwaukee Theatre	Supporting Bastille
October 19, 2014	Saint Paul	United States	Roy Wilkins Auditorium	Supporting Bastille
October 21, 2014	Chicago	United States	Aragon Ballroom	Supporting Bastille
October 23, 2014	Detroit	United States	Masonic Temple Theatre	Supporting Bastille
October 24, 2014	Rochester	United States	Main Street Armory	Supporting Bastille

=== The Vagabonds Tour (January – February 2015) ===
The Vagabonds Tour (January – February 2015)
Date	City	Country	Venue	Support
January 29, 2015	Chicago	United States	Schubas	COIN
February 2, 2015	Ann Arbor	United States	Blind Pig	COIN
February 4, 2015	Washington, D.C.	United States	Black Cat (Backstage)	COIN
February 5, 2015	Philadelphia	United States	World Cafe Live	COIN
February 8, 2015	Cambridge	United States	Middle East (Upstairs)	COIN
February 9, 2015	Brooklyn	United States	Knitting Factory	COIN

=== Lovetap! Tour (April – May 2015) ===
Lovetap! Tour (April – May 2015)
Date	City	Country	Venue	Support
April 14, 2015	Houston	United States	Fitzgerald's	Vinyl Theatre, Supporting Smallpools
April 15, 2015	Dallas	United States	House of Blues	Vinyl Theatre, Supporting Smallpools
April 17, 2015	Tulsa	United States	The Vanguard	Vinyl Theatre, Supporting Smallpools
April 19, 2015	St. Louis	United States	Firebird	Vinyl Theatre, Supporting Smallpools
April 21, 2015	Nashville	United States	Exit / In	Vinyl Theatre, Supporting Smallpools
April 23, 2015	Atlanta	United States	Terminal West	Vinyl Theatre, Supporting Smallpools
April 24, 2015	Saxapahaw	United States	Haw River Ballroom	Vinyl Theatre, Supporting Smallpools
April 25, 2015	Washington, D.C.	United States	U Street Music Hall	Vinyl Theatre, Supporting Smallpools
April 27, 2015	Pittsburgh	United States	Altar Bar	Vinyl Theatre, Supporting Smallpools
April 28, 2015	Philadelphia	United States	Union Transfer	Vinyl Theatre, Supporting Smallpools
April 30, 2015	Columbus	United States	Newport Music Hall	Vinyl Theatre, Supporting Smallpools
May 5, 2015	Cleveland	United States	Beachland Ballroom	Vinyl Theatre, Supporting Smallpools
May 6, 2015	Detroit	United States	St. Andrew's Hall	Vinyl Theatre, Supporting Smallpools
May 7, 2015	Toronto	Canada	Adelaide Hall	Vinyl Theatre, Supporting Smallpools
May 9, 2015	Cambridge, MA	United States	Middle East (Downstairs)	Vinyl Theatre, Supporting Smallpools
May 11, 2015	New York City	United States	Bowery Ballroom	Vinyl Theatre, Supporting Smallpools
May 13, 2015	Indianapolis	United States	Deluxe at Old National	Hunter Hunted, Supporting Smallpools
May 14, 2015	Minneapolis	United States	Triple Rock	Hunter Hunted, Supporting Smallpools
May 15, 2015	Kansas City	United States	Record Bar	Slow Down, Hunter Hunted, Supporting Smallpools
May 16, 2015	Denver	United States	Summit Music Hall	Hunter Hunted, Supporting Smallpools
May 18, 2015	Salt Lake City	United States	Club Sound	Hunter Hunted, Supporting Smallpools
May 20, 2015	Portland	United States	Wonder Ballroom	Hunter Hunted, Supporting Smallpools
May 23, 2015	Seattle	United States	The Crocodile	Hunter Hunted, Supporting Smallpools
May 25, 2015	San Francisco	United States	The Independent	Hunter Hunted, Supporting Smallpools
May 28, 2015	Santa Ana	United States	The Observatory Oc	Hunter Hunted, Supporting Smallpools
May 29, 2015	Los Angeles	United States	El Rey	Hunter Hunted, Supporting Smallpools

=== Summer Tour (June 2015) ===
Summer Tour (June 2015)
Date	City	Country	Venue	Support
June 5, 2015	Phoenix	United States	Crescent Ballroom	Luna Aura, Bogan Via
June 7, 2015^{[A]}	Houston	United States	NRG Park – Yellow Lot	–
June 8, 2015	Austin	United States	The Parish	Handsome Ghost
June 10, 2015	Little Rock	United States	Stickyz	Handsome Ghost
June 11, 2015	Memphis	United States	Lafayette's Music Room	Handsome Ghost
June 12, 2015	Pensacola	United States	Vinyl Music Hall	Handsome Ghost
June 14, 2015	Orlando	United States	Orlando City Soccer Club	Handsome Ghost
June 15, 2015	Atlanta	United States	Vinyl	Handsome Ghost
June 16, 2015	Charleston	United States	The Royal American	Handsome Ghost
June 18, 2015^{[B]}	Dover	United States	The Woodlands	–
June 19, 2015	Richmond	United States	The National	Andrew McMahon in the Wilderness

^{A} Free Press Summer Fest
^{B} Firefly Music Festival

=== Autumn Tour (September – November 2015) ===
Autumn Tour (September – November 2015)
Date	City	Country	Venue	Support
September 16, 2015	Toronto	Canada	Danforth Music Hall	Supporting The Fratellis
September 18, 2015	New York City	United States	Webster Hall	Supporting The Fratellis
September 21, 2015	Washington, D.C.	United States	9:30 Club	Supporting The Fratellis
September 22, 2015	Philadelphia	United States	Theatre of Living Arts	Supporting The Fratellis
September 24, 2015	Chicago	United States	The Vic Theatre	Supporting The Fratellis
September 25, 2015	Minneapolis	United States	Varsity Theater	Supporting The Fratellis
September 27, 2015	Denver	United States	Bluebird Theater	Supporting The Fratellis
September 28, 2015	Salt Lake City	United States	Urban Lounge	Supporting The Fratellis
September 30, 2015	Vancouver	Canada	Commodore Ballroom	Supporting The Fratellis
October 1, 2015	Seattle	United States	Neptune Theatre	Supporting The Fratellis
October 3, 2015	Portland	United States	Wonder Ballroom	Supporting The Fratellis
October 4, 2015	San Francisco	United States	Regency Ballroom	Supporting The Fratellis
October 6, 2015	San Diego	United States	House of Blues	Supporting The Fratellis
October 8, 2015	Los Angeles	United States	The Wiltern	Supporting The Fratellis
October 30, 2015^{[A]}	New Orleans	United States	City Park	–
November 18, 2015	Vancouver	Canada	Vogue Theatre	X Ambassadors
November 20, 2015	Edmonton	Canada	The Starlite Room	X Ambassadors
November 21, 2015	Calgary	Canada	The Gateway	X Ambassadors
November 22, 2015	Saskatoon	Canada	Louis'	X Ambassadors
November 24, 2015	Winnipeg	Canada	The Park Theatre	X Ambassadors
November 27, 2015	London	Canada	London Music Hall	X Ambassadors
November 28, 2015	Toronto	Canada	Opera House	X Ambassadors
November 29, 2015	Montreal	Canada	Olympia	X Ambassadors

:^{A} Voodoo Music + Arts Experience

=== Troublemaker Tour (January – February 2016) ===
On November 8, 2015, the band announced through the new mailing of their newsletter "Roadworthy" that they had finished work on their first full-length album Waking Up the Giants, that album pre-orders could be made from November 10, 2015, onwards and an accompanying headliner tour of which the pre-sale would also start on November 10, 2015. The band named this the Troublemaker Tour, after the lead single from Waking Up the Giants. Grizfolk played 26 shows in 21 different states, two different countries during a time span of 36 days.

Troublemaker Tour (January – February 2016)
Date	City	Country	Venue	Support
January 21, 2016	San Diego	United States	House of Blues (Voodoo Room)	
January 22, 2016	Santa Ana	United States	Constellation Room	
January 23, 2016	San Francisco	United States	Bottom of the Hill	
January 25, 2016	Portland	United States	Doug Fir Lounge	
January 26, 2016	Seattle	United States	The Crocodile	
January 28, 2016	Salt Lake City	United States	Kilby Court	
January 30, 2016	Denver	United States	Lost Lake Lounge	
February 1, 2016	Minneapolis	United States	7th St. Entry	
February 2, 2016	Milwaukee	United States	Shank Hall	
February 3, 2016	Chicago	United States	Lincoln Hall	
February 5, 2016	Detroit	United States	The Shelter	
February 6, 2016	Cleveland	United States	Grog Shop	
February 7, 2016	Toronto	Canada	The Garrison	
February 9, 2016	Allston	United States	Great Scott	
February 11, 2016	New York City	United States	Gramercy Theatre	
February 12, 2016	Philadelphia	United States	Johnny Brenda's	
February 13, 2016	Washington, D.C.	United States	Rock & Roll Hotel	
February 14, 2016	Richmond	United States	The Broadberry	
February 16, 2016	Nashville	United States	The High Watt	
February 17, 2016	Atlanta	United States	Vinyl	
February 18, 2016	Pensacola	United States	Vinyl Music Hall	
February 20, 2016	Houston	United States	Rudyards	
February 21, 2016	Austin	United States	Stubbs Jr.	
February 22, 2016	Dallas	United States	The Prophet Bar	
February 25, 2016	Phoenix	United States	Valley Bar	
February 26, 2016	Los Angeles	United States	Troubadour	
