= Sober Up =

Single by AJR from 2018

Single by AJR featuring Rivers Cuomo

from the album The Click
- Released: June 9, 2017
- Length: 3:38
- Label: AJR Productions; Black Butter
- Songwriters: Adam Met; Jack Met; Ryan Met; Rivers Cuomo
- Producer: AJR

AJR singles chronology
"Drama" (2017)	"Sober Up" (2017)	"Burn the House Down" (2018)

Rivers Cuomo singles chronology
"I Still Wanna Know" (2017)	"Sober Up" (2017)	"Medicine for Melancholy" (2018)

"Sober Up" is a song by American indie pop band AJR, from their second studio album, The Click. Released as the album's fifth single, it features Rivers Cuomo, lead singer and frontman of American rock band Weezer, although certain radio stations instead play a version with band member Ryan singing Cuomo's verse. "Sober Up" became the first number-one song for AJR on the Billboard Alternative Songs, when it peaked at number one on the chart in March 2018. Similarly, it also makes Cuomo his first number-one song as a solo artist outside of Weezer.

== Background ==
The inspiration for "Sober Up" came to Jack and Ryan Met during their time at Columbia University, the brothers missing their childhood. Taking inspiration from their feelings of loneliness, they wrote about Jack calling his second grade crush from elementary school. iHeartRadio describes "Sober Up" as a positive song despite its difficult lyrics.

Near the end of writing, Rivers Cuomo of Weezer followed AJR on Twitter. The two bands expressed admiration for each other's work, with AJR asking if Cuomo wanted to collaborate with them. Cuomo was sent an unfinished version of the song, to which he wrote and sang the bridge. Cuomo recorded several versions, including one in Spanish, one that was nonsensical, and the one that was eventually accepted into the final track.

== Music video ==
On January 31, 2018, a music video for "Sober Up" was released. In the music video, the band is walking through New York City while singer Jack Met meets a younger version of himself that is only visible in reflections.

== Critical reception ==
"Sober Up" received generally positive reviews from critics, particularly for its catchy melody and unique sound.

== Chart performance ==
In March 2018, "Sober Up" peaked at number one on the Billboard Alternative Songs chart and was the first number one song for AJR. For Rivers Cuomo, "Sober Up" was his first song to reach number one on Billboard's Alternative chart as a solo artist outside of Weezer. The song was additionally picked as iHeartRadio's digital song for October.

== Live performances ==
In January 2018, AJR performed "Sober Up" on Jimmy Kimmel Live! alongside their previous hit "Weak". Cuomo has performed the song with AJR for select shows, additionally covering it for some solo shows.

In March 2018, Cuomo played an acoustic cover of "Sober Up" during An Evening with Rivers Cuomo at The Hi Hat in Los Angeles.

== Charts ==
=== Weekly charts ===
Weekly chart performance for "Sober Up"
Chart (2018)	Peak position
Canada Hot AC (Billboard)	35
Canada Rock (Billboard)	11
US Adult Alternative Airplay (Billboard)	27
US Adult Pop Airplay (Billboard)	15
US Alternative Airplay (Billboard)	1
US Alternative Digital Song Sales (Billboard)	7
US Bubbling Under Hot 100 (Billboard)	7
US Pop Airplay (Billboard)	29
US Rock & Alternative Airplay (Billboard)	3

=== Year-end charts ===
Year-end chart performance for "Sober Up"
Chart (2018)	Peak position
Iceland (Plötutíóindi)	75
US Adult Top 40 (Billboard)	49
US Rock Airplay (Billboard)	15

== Certifications ==
Region	Certification	Certified units/sales
Australia (ARIA)	Gold	35,000^{‡}
Canada (Music Canada)	Platinum	80,000^{‡}
United States (RIAA)	2× Platinum	2,000,000^{‡}
^{‡} Sales+streaming figures based on certification alone.

== See also ==
- List of Billboard number-one alternative singles of the 2010s
