= Hailey Knox =

- Born: September 22, 1998 (age 27); Carmel, New York
- Genres: Indie pop, R&B, pop
- Occupations: Singer, songwriter, producer
- Instruments: Vocals, guitar
- Years active: 2015–present
- Labels: S-Curve Records, 10K Projects

Hailey Knox (born September 22, 1998) is an American singer-songwriter and producer. She rose to prominence through her viral singing videos on YouTube and YouNow. In 2016, she opened for Charlie Puth's We Don't Talk Anymore Tour, which earned her a spot on People magazine's Ones To Watch list.

== Life and career ==
=== Early life and career beginnings ===
Knox was born and raised in Carmel, New York. She learned guitar from her dad, a police officer, at age seven. The first song she learned was "Blackbird" by The Beatles. In third and fourth grade, she performed in talent shows. When she was 12 years old, renowned producers Mike Mangini and Peter Zizzo noticed her on YouTube, later working with her on original music. In 2012, under the management of her mother, Knox performed in clubs and coffee shops around New York with her sister Samantha as part of the duo The Knox Sisters.

Knox began posting acoustic covers on Facebook in 2014, then transitioned to YouTube due to a large volume of song requests. The first time Knox can recount going viral was when she and her friend Juno covered “It’s Strange” by Louis the Child featuring K. Flay. Her viral success attracted the attention of producers and American singer-songwriter Meghan Trainor, who retweeted Knox's cover of "Ain’t No Sunshine" by Bill Withers.

=== 2015–2017: A Little Awkward ===
Knox continued to expand her fanbase through the livestreaming service YouNow, where she performed covers and originals, leading to a record deal with S-Curve Records in 2015. After getting signed, Knox released "Geeks" in May 2015, which received another Tweet from Trainor. The following year she released her first EP, A Little Awkward, and promoted it as an opener for Charlie Puth's We Don't Talk Anymore Tour. This resulted in Knox being featured in People magazine's 2016 Ones To Watch list. To focus on her music career, Knox dropped out of public school and finished her final year of high school online. At the 2017 iHeartRadio Music Awards, she was nominated for a social star award because of her YouNow channel.

=== 2018–2020: Hardwired Mixtape ===
In January 2018, Knox released "Don't Got One", which is about the lack of real connection in the age of social media. She promoted the song and her previous releases as an opener for Ruth B's 2018 tour. Her first full-length album, Hardwired Mixtape, came out on November 16, 2018, through S-Curve Records. The album's name reflects how "it's slightly all over the place", featuring a conglomeration of highly produced pop tracks, raw acoustic tracks, and unfinished snippets. In 2019, the title track, "Hardwired", was featured in an episode of Grey's Anatomy.

=== 2021–present: Independent music and For the Best ===
In 2021, Knox went independent and started posting on TikTok, where she went viral. In January 2022, she was added to American rapper Russ's song "Remember" after completing an open verse challenge on TikTok. She uploaded a loop and guitar riff to TikTok on January 11, 2023, which she released as "Available For Me" a week later due to its viral success.

In July 2024, Knox released her album For the Best through 10K Projects. The album was written with her boyfriend of seven years and explored the ups and downs of their relationship.

== Artistry ==
=== Musical influences ===
Growing up, Knox listened to Stevie Wonder, Dave Matthews Band, Miley Cyrus, Aly and AJ, and Hilary Duff. She credits Allen Stone, Justin Bieber, Jon Bellion, Yebba, Lennon Stella, Teyana Taylor, and Brockhampton as musical influences. She was also inspired by Ed Sheeran's percussive guitar and loops to learn loop pedaling at age 16 or 17.

=== Musical styles ===
In her early career days, Knox focused on acoustic and indie pop, creating covers and originals with just her guitar and a loop pedal. In a review of Hardwired Mixtape, Atwood Magazine referred to Knox as "a pop, rock, and acoustic singer/songwriter all in one". Her 2021 songs “Butterfly Doors” and “Gucci Prada Balenciaga” dabbled in rap, and her 2024 album For the Best dove into R&B-leaning production.

=== Songwriting and production ===
Knox's songwriting process usually begins with a melody or chord progression, which she expands on using her loop pedal. She is heavily involved in the production process and began producing her own music during the 2020 COVID-19 pandemic.
