= Drama (AJR song) =

2017 single by AJR

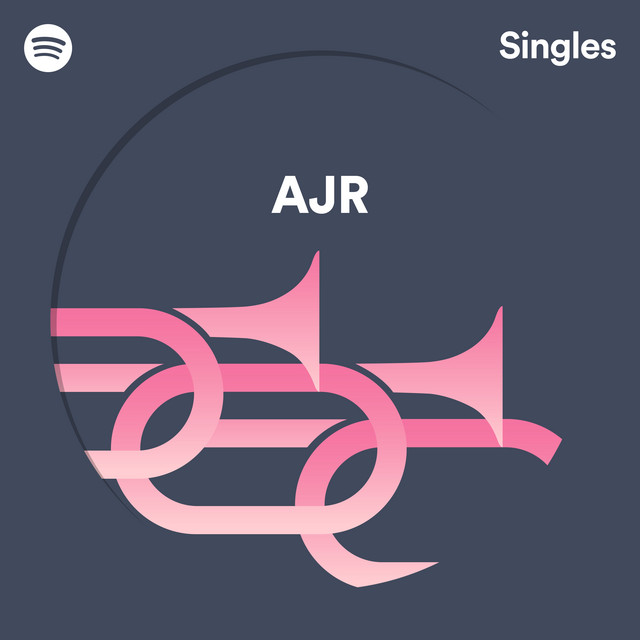
- Artwork used for the song's Spotify single.

Single by AJR

from the album The Click
- Released: May 12, 2017
- Studio: Sterling Sound (New York City)
- Length: 3:24
- Label: AJR Productions; Black Butter
- Songwriters: Jack Met; Adam Met; Ryan Met
- Producer: Ryan Met

AJR singles chronology
"Celebrate" (2017)	"Drama" (2017)	"Sober Up" (2017)

Lyric video
- "Drama" on YouTube

"Drama" is a song by American indie pop band AJR. It was released on May 12, 2017, via their own label AJR Productions as the fourth single from the band's second studio album, The Click (2017).

== Background ==
"Drama" is described by the band as exactly what was happening at the time, pointing out the "most unimportant problems in life that everyone is obsessed with" such as interest in Katy Perry and Taylor Swift rather than major political issues. The band later played the song live at Spotify's New York City studio, Sterling Sound, and released the recording alongside a cover of Khalid's song "Location" on August 11, 2017.

== Composition ==
"Drama" is composed in 4/4 time signature in the key of D major and follows a tempo of 156 beats per minute (bpm). The band took a hip-hop approach to the song, taking inspiration from Kendrick Lamar while incorporating their own sound. During AJR's The Click Tour in 2018, they revealed the step-by-step production of the song, showcasing the use of distorted drums and snares, hi-hats, a "kinda dark and moody but also a little bit partyish" bassline, piano, violin, spoons, and a pitched-up vocal sample of Jack Met.

== Commercial performance ==
"Drama" was picked for iHeartRadio's song of the day on July 26, 2017. Alongside a lyric video for the song, the song was released to Billboard's Top 40 on August 8, becoming the #3 most added song within the week through 25 stations. Time additionally complimented "Drama", describing it as "calling attention to some of the more challenging elements of contemporary social life while maintaining unstoppable melodic momentum".

== Personnel ==
Credits adapted from the album's liner notes.

- Adam Met – vocals, instruments, composer
- Jack Met – main vocals, instruments, composer
- Ryan Met – vocals, instruments, composer, producer
- Chris Gehringer – mastering engineer
- Tony Maserati – mixing engineer

== Charts ==
Weekly chart performance for "Drama"
Chart (2017)	Peak position
Belgium (Ultratip Bubbling Under Flanders)	–
