= Come Hang Out =

2016 song by AJR

- Promotional image for the song's music video

Song by AJR

from the EP What Everyone's Thinking and the album The Click
- Released: September 16, 2016
- Recorded: 2016
- Genre: Indie pop
- Length: 4:26
- Label: AJR Productions; S-Curve; Ultra; Black Butter
- Songwriters: Jack Met; Ryan Met
- Producer: Ryan Met

Music video
- "Come Hang Out" on YouTube

"Come Hang Out" is a song by American pop band AJR, appearing as the opening track of their fourth EP What Everyone's Thinking on September 16, 2016. It was later included as the closer of their second studio album The Click (2017), receiving a music video the next year in partnership with Original Penguin. The song discusses the balance of personal development with social status.

== Background ==
In 2016, lead singer Jack Met noticed he had often received texts from friends to "come hang out" and he denied each request. This led the band to write about the social sacrifice made to develop their music and the emotional split from balancing a social life with a career and personal interests. "Come Hang Out" was included on What Everyone's Thinking, releasing on September 16, 2016. It was later released as the final song on The Click (2017), inspiring the album's theme and title through the metronome-accompanied lyric "Should I go for more clicks this year? / Or should I follow the click in my ear?". AJR has stated that their song "Christmas in June" from OK Orchestra (2021) is a continuation of "Come Hang Out".

== Music video ==
A music video for "Come Hang Out" was filmed in Los Angeles in October 2017. This was done in partnership with Original Penguin, with the band and partygoers wearing new clothing from the fashion brand. The video was directed by Ron Peters and released on February 7, 2018, alongside the release of Original Penguin's 2018 spring collection "Mixtape". Within the video, AJR attends a house party with numerous people, including models Malik Lambert and Micky Ayoub. They sing the song's backing vocals while performing various activities inside the house and at a pool. The band takes no part in this, symbolizing the brothers' preference to focus on their careers.

== Personnel ==
Credits adapted from the album's liner notes.

- Adam Met – bass, backing vocals
- Jack Met – lead vocals, guitar, percussion, ukulele
- Ryan Met – keyboards, ukulele, backing vocals, production, programming, mixing
- Chris Gehringer – mastering engineer
- Samia Finnerty – guest vocals
- Jake Kenowitz – trumpet
- Alicia Svigals – violin
