= OK Orchestra Tour =

2021–2022 concert tour by AJR

- Tour by AJR
- Promotional poster for the tour
- Location: Australia; Europe; North America; Oceania
- Associated album: OK Orchestra
- Start date: September 7, 2021
- End date: October 20, 2022
- No. of shows: 71
- Supporting acts: Daisy the Great; Sasha Alex Sloan; Gayle; BoyWithUke; Alexander 23; Ryan Mack
- Attendance: 233,849 (Note: Attendance over the reported 35 dates); 350,000+
- Box office: $9,820,167 (Note: Amount grossed over the reported 35 dates)

AJR concert chronology
- Neotheater World Tour (2019–2020); OK Orchestra Tour (2021–2022); The Maybe Man Tour (2024)

The OK Orchestra Tour was the fifth concert tour by the American pop band AJR, supporting their fourth studio album, OK Orchestra (2021). It ran from September 7, 2021, to October 20, 2022, and covered 71 shows across four continents. The set list consisted primarily of songs from OK Orchestra, with a few numbers from the band's previous albums The Click (2017) and Neotheater (2019).

== Background and development ==
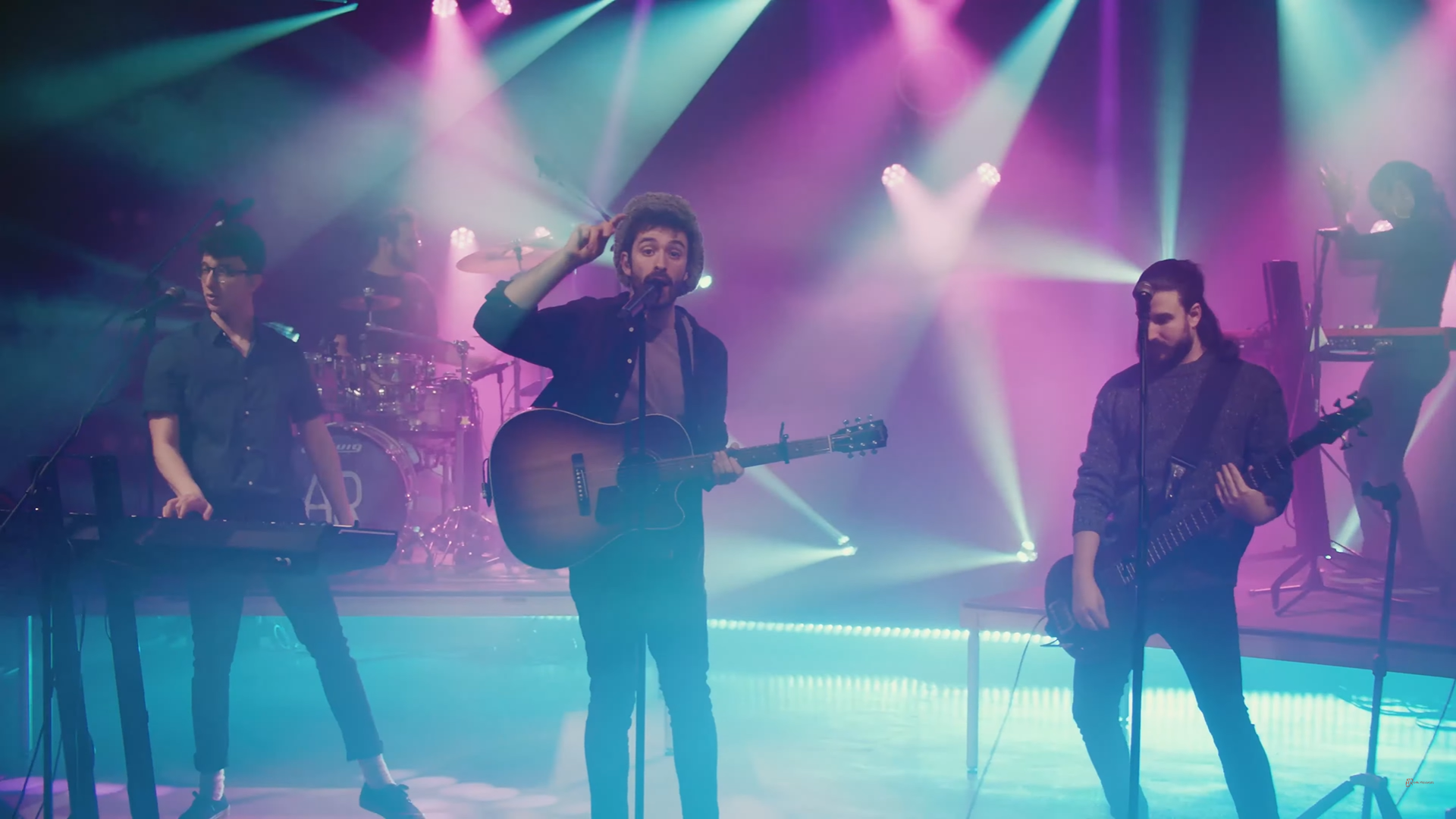
AJR performing "Bummerland" for the "We The People" virtual concert

Following news of the COVID-19 pandemic, AJR canceled the second leg of the Neotheater World Tour and the Everything Everywhere Tour in May 2020. The band performed drive-in concerts and virtual shows as safe alternatives to the tours through to 2021. AJR wrote their fourth album during this time, which released as OK Orchestra on March 26, 2021. On March 31, the band stated plans to tour in 2022, which was formally announced on April 11 as the OK Orchestra Tour. Presale tickets were sold through Live Nation Entertainment beginning on April 13 via a text-provided access code, while general tickets became available on April 16. With 32 shows across the United States, AJR additionally teased international dates in the same announcement.

On July 11, the band announced a 2021 leg of the OK Orchestra Tour with 12 new dates and VIP packages for the entire tour, which from lowest to highest tier included exclusive merchandise, early entry, a group photo, a live master class and Q&A with Ryan Met, and a dodgeball or Pictionary game with the band. These tickets and packages became available on July 16. The OK Orchestra Tour started on September 7 at The Sylvee in Madison, Wisconsin, with the first leg ending in October. On September 13, AJR postponed the September 16 show at the Zoo Amphitheatre in Oklahoma City to June 7, 2022, due to an inability to enforce COVID-19 safety regulations. The night before the band's September 23 concert at Palace Theatre in Albany, the show's changed its venue, instead taking place at Times Union Center. Shows during the 2021 leg were opened by Daisy the Great and Sasha Alex Sloan.

On September 18, 2021, AJR announced eight more dates in the United States for 2022, additionally announcing 18 dates in Europe. Tickets for these shows became available on September 24. On November 21, the band stated they would release new music before the 2022 leg. On February 9, 2022, AJR released a music video for "Ordinaryish People" featuring Blue Man Group, who announced on the same day that they would join the OK Orchestra Tour for five dates. The band later canceled their October 22 concert at the 1930 Moscow Concert hall in Moscow on February 25 due to the Russian invasion of Ukraine. On March 31, tickets for five dates in Australia and New Zealand became available, followed the next day by an additional date in Dublin. On May 9, the tour's May 10 show at Riverbend Music Center in Cincinnati was rescheduled to May 17 due to heavy rainfall in the Ohio River bordering the flood stage. Gayle was the tour's opening act from the start of the 2022 leg up to May 21, while BoyWithUke opened shows from May 27 to June 24. Dates in Australia and New Zealand were opened by Alexander 23, and Ryan Mack supported the tour's European leg.

== Reception ==
The tour received positive reviews from critics. Brittaney Penney of The Honey Pop praised the show's stage design with a walking treadmill and an interactive LED screen. Dan Garcia hailed the performance of "Bang!" alongside a fireworks show and a story told by the band involving Elton John accidentally complimenting them. Piet Levy of Milwaukee Journal Sentinel complimented Mitchell Schellenger's creative direction for the tour, highlighting the treadmill usage in "3 O'Clock Things" and a Blue Man Group-inspired segment for "Ordinaryish People" which involved the band drumming with digital paint effects behind them. Levy further lauded Ryan Met's solo performance of "Joe" with beatboxing provided by Kenny Urban, the breakdown of the production involved in "Weak", and "Burn the House Down" for its illusory effects where Jack throws various objects and himself through one screen and emerges from another.

Raina Kutliroff of The Daily Illini admired touring trumpeter Arnetta Johnson for her energetic performance and dancing, particularly noting the trumpet interlude in which she played various songs not in the setlist. Kutliroff additionally commended the concert's narrative, surrounding a "Do Not Push" button that lead singer Jack Met later disclosed represented his struggles with obsessive–compulsive disorder before "an explosion of a grand finale" by pushing it. Alex McEwen of Culturess noted that the tour's rescheduled show on June 7 in Oklahoma City differed greatly from other shows, with an absence of the "Do Not Push" button and an encore with "100 Bad Days" re-used from AJR's One Spectacular Night, altering the setlist. This encore was additionally used in New Zealand, with Courtney Tabener of Ambient Light enjoying the show's lighting design and Jack's high-energy performance.

== The OK Orchestra Tour Doc ==
Alongside the development of the tour, AJR released The OK Orchestra Tour Doc, a six-episode documentary series that was directed by Austin Roa and published to YouTube between October 24, 2021, and November 6, 2022. Episodes ranged 7–17 minutes in length and showcased rehearsals, fan interactions, concert highlights, backstage footage, and hardships with the tour.

Episode	Directed by	Original release date	Length (minutes)
1	Austin Roa	October 24, 2021	17:46
Between August 20 and August 28, 2021, AJR meets with their touring team to plan and rehearse stage acts, including for "Ordinaryish People" and "3 O'Clock Things". Once the tour begins, various fan interactions, performance snippets, and master class sessions from the 2021 leg are shown intermittently. The band celebrates the birthdays of touring drummer Chris Berry and concertgoers, later playing various ball games with their crew. On two dates, some personnel test positive for COVID-19, leading to everyone else being tested to ensure the show can still proceed.
2	Austin Roa	May 14, 2022	10:11
AJR holds a rehearsal week for the tour's 2022 leg, discussing the visualizer for "I Won't", designing instruments, and practicing "Joe" with Kenny Urban. The band then interacts with fans as more performance snippets are shown. Shortly before the scheduled start time of the 2022 leg's first show, Adam and Ryan go on a scooter ride with Steve Greenberg and get lost with dead batteries, and are lectured by Jack and other personnel upon returning.
3	Austin Roa	May 29, 2022	7:17
A thunderstorm before the tour's concert at Cynthia Woods Mitchell Pavilion concerns AJR's ability to catch a plane to their next show, leading the team to discuss potentially cutting songs before receiving clearance to perform the full show. Further performance clips and fan interactions are shown, including a celebration of Keith's birthday and a dedication of "The Good Part" to a fan.
4	Austin Roa	June 27, 2022	12:21
The band celebrates David's birthday. During a concert at Value City Arena, AJR performs "Bang!" without visuals due to a technical failure. Fan interactions and concert snippets are shown, including performances from Blue Man Group. Their dad attends the OK Orchestra Tour for the first time, and he commends their success. After various games, a flash flood warning goes into effect before the show at Red Hat Amphitheater, forcing a majority of visual effects to be removed to prevent equipment damage. AJR holds a ceremony celebrating Adam's graduation from University of Birmingham, and throws the ceremonial first pitch of a baseball game at Petco Park.
5	Austin Roa	September 10, 2022	12:51
AJR ends the United States portion of their tour by fully shaving a crew member. In Australia, the band interacts with fans and performs a shoey, with additional concert highlights being played. They give a radio interview with KIIS 106.5 discussing "I'm Ready" alongside other singles, and later prank drummer Chris and tour personnel Rob and Ezra with fake shaves. AJR gives additional interviews with Sunrise, Nova FM, and ZM Radio before traveling to New Zealand, where the band jokes backstage and plays two more shows.
6	Austin Roa	November 6, 2022	8:45
The band performs the tour's European shows and interacts with fans. Adam begins taking naproxen after throwing his back out, as his consistent usage of advil rendered the medicine ineffective. The band rehearses a new routine for "Ordinaryish People" and works on new songs in their tour bus. Technical difficulties during the middle of a show briefly delay "Joe", and Ryan later breaks his glasses before the encore. Tour personnel record claps and stomps for a song and then play toy bowling. The series ends with the band driving in the rain.

== Set list ==
The following set lists are adapted from the show in Norfolk on September 19, 2021, and the show in Austin on April 29, 2022. It is not intended to represent all shows throughout the tour.

=== 2021 leg ===
1. "Bummerland"
2. "3 O'Clock Things"
3. "Adventure Is Out There"
4. "Weak"
5. "Dear Winter" / "The Trick"
6. "Christmas in June"
7. "Ordinaryish People"
8. "Karma"
9. Interlude ("Come Hang Out" / "Netflix Trip" / "Birthday Party" / "All My Favorite Songs" / "The Green and the Town" / "Don't Throw Out My Legos" / "Break My Face" / "I'm Ready" / "Humpty Dumpty")
10. "Joe"
11. "Record Player"
12. "World's Smallest Violin"
13. "100 Bad Days"
14. How We Made / "Bang!"
15. "My Play"
16. "Burn the House Down"

Encore

17. "Sober Up"
18. "Way Less Sad"
19. "OK Overture"

=== 2022 leg ===
1. "Bummerland"
2. "Karma"
3. "3 O'Clock Things"
4. "Bang!"
5. "Dear Winter" / "The Trick
6. "Don't Throw Out My Legos"
7. "Ordinaryish People"
8. "100 Bad Days"
9. Interlude ("Next Up Forever" / "Netflix Trip" / "Birthday Party" / "Record Player" / "The Green and the Town" / "I'm Ready" / "Break My Face" / "Christmas in June" / "Turning Out")
10. "Joe"
11. "I Won't"
12. "World's Smallest Violin"
13. "Humpty Dumpty"
14. How We Made / "Weak"
15. "The Good Part"
16. "Burn the House Down"

Encore

17. "Sober Up"
18. "Way Less Sad"
19. "OK Overture"

== Tour dates ==
List of 2021 concerts
Date (2021)	City	Country	Venue	Opening act	Attendance	Revenue
September 7	Madison	United States	The Sylvee	Daisy the Great; Sasha Alex Sloan	2,352 / 2,413	$140,938
September 8	Grand Rapids	United States	DeltaPlex Arena & Conference Center	Daisy the Great; Sasha Alex Sloan	—N/a	—N/a
September 12	Peoria	United States	Peoria Civic Center	Daisy the Great; Sasha Alex Sloan	2,986 / 6,059	$155,895
September 14	Des Moines	United States	Wells Fargo Arena	Daisy the Great; Sasha Alex Sloan	—N/a	—N/a
September 15	Wichita	United States	Hartman Arena	Daisy the Great; Sasha Alex Sloan	—N/a	—N/a
September 19	Norfolk	United States	Atlantic Union Bank Pavilion	Daisy the Great; Sasha Alex Sloan	—N/a	—N/a
September 23	Albany	United States	Palace Theatre	Daisy the Great; Sasha Alex Sloan	—N/a	—N/a
September 24	Portland	United States	Cross Insurance Arena	Daisy the Great; Sasha Alex Sloan	—N/a	—N/a
September 25	Wallingford	United States	Toyota Oakdale Theatre	Daisy the Great; Sasha Alex Sloan	—N/a	—N/a
September 28	Louisville	United States	Palace Theatre	Daisy the Great; Sasha Alex Sloan	—N/a	—N/a
October 1	Jacksonville	United States	Daily's Place	Daisy the Great; Sasha Alex Sloan	3,817 / 5,237	$168,183

List of 2022 concerts
Date (2022)	City	Country	Venue	Opening act	Attendance	Revenue
April 28	Dallas	United States	Toyota Music Factory	Gayle	8,036 / 8,228	$356,222
April 29	Austin	United States	Circuit of the Americas	Gayle	—N/a	—N/a
April 30	Houston	United States	Cynthia Woods Mitchell Pavilion	Gayle	7,560 / 16,087	$359,274
May 3	Orlando	United States	Addition Financial Arena	Gayle	6,251 / 6,251	$363,689
May 4	Tampa	United States	MidFlorida Credit Union Amphitheatre	Gayle	—N/a	—N/a
May 6	Atlanta	United States	Ameris Bank Amphitheatre	Gayle	—N/a	—N/a
May 7	Raleigh	United States	Red Hat Amphitheater	Gayle	5,609 / 5,800	$267,625
May 8	Charlotte	United States	PNC Music Pavilion	Gayle	—N/a	—N/a
May 11	Cleveland	United States	Wolstein Center	Gayle	—N/a	—N/a
May 13	Columbus	United States	Value City Arena	Gayle	7,182 / 7,436	$405,855
May 14	Washington, D.C.	United States	Merriweather Post Pavilion	Gayle	14,857 / 15,000	$491,065
May 15	Philadelphia	United States	TD Pavilion at the Mann	Gayle	11,723 / 12,035	$490,245
May 17	Cincinnati	United States	Riverbend Music Center	Gayle	—N/a	—N/a
May 18	Pittsburgh	United States	Petersen Events Center	Gayle	6,286 / 8,025	$354,821
May 20	Mansfield	United States	Xfinity Center	Gayle; Blue Man Group	—N/a	—N/a
May 21	New York City	United States	Forest Hills Stadium	Gayle; Blue Man Group	11,328 / 12,650	$660,336
May 27	Detroit	United States	Pine Knob Music Theatre	BoyWithUke	13,920 / 14,929	$451,889
May 28	Indianapolis	United States	Ruoff Music Center	BoyWithUke	—N/a	—N/a
May 29	Nashville	United States	Ascend Amphitheater	BoyWithUke	6,830 / 6,830	$253,611
May 31	St. Louis	United States	Hollywood Casino Amphitheatre	BoyWithUke	—N/a	—N/a
June 1	Kansas City	United States	Starlight Theatre	BoyWithUke	7,178 / 7,262	$334,486
June 3	Chicago	United States	Hollywood Casino Amphitheatre	BoyWithUke; Blue Man Group	—N/a	—N/a
June 4	Milwaukee	United States	American Family Insurance Amphitheater	BoyWithUke	10,802 / 23,410	$563,656
June 5	Minneapolis	United States	Minneapolis Armory	BoyWithUke	6,543 / 6,877	$315,649
June 7	Oklahoma City	United States	Oklahoma City Zoo and Botanical Garden	BoyWithUke	6,000 / 6,000	$264,707
June 8	Omaha	United States	Baxter Arena	BoyWithUke	—N/a	—N/a
June 10	Denver	United States	Fiddler's Green Amphitheatre	BoyWithUke	16,661 / 16,661	$624,947
June 11	Salt Lake City	United States	USANA Amphitheatre	BoyWithUke	19,416 / 20,097	$569,668
June 12	Boise	United States	Ford Idaho Center	BoyWithUke	—N/a	—N/a
June 14	Seattle	United States	White River Amphitheatre	BoyWithUke	8,850 / 9,326	$366,943
June 15	Portland	United States	RV Inn Style Resorts Amphitheater	BoyWithUke	6,852 / 7,413	$405,586
June 17	San Francisco	United States	Concord Pavilion	BoyWithUke	10,605 / 12,097	$354,713
June 19	Irvine	United States	FivePoint Amphitheatre	BoyWithUke; Blue Man Group	10,863 / 11,695	$345,912
June 21	Phoenix	United States	Ak-Chin Pavilion	BoyWithUke	—N/a	—N/a
June 22	San Diego	United States	Petco Park	BoyWithUke	—N/a	—N/a
June 24	Las Vegas	United States	Cosmopolitan of Las Vegas	BoyWithUke; Blue Man Group	3,267 / 3,267	$165,284
June 26	Honolulu	United States	Neal S. Blaisdell Center	—N/a	—N/a	—N/a
August 19	Melbourne	Australia	Palais Theatre	Alexander 23	—N/a	—N/a
August 21	Brisbane	Australia	Fortitude Music Hall	Alexander 23	—N/a	—N/a
August 23	Sydney	Australia	Hordern Pavilion	Alexander 23	3,257 / 5,550	$132,734
August 27	Auckland	New Zealand	Spark Arena	Alexander 23	2,002 / 3,477	$81,071
August 28	Wellington	New Zealand	Michael Fowler Centre	Alexander 23	—N/a	—N/a
September 25	Dublin	Ireland	Olympia Theatre	Ryan Mack	1,602 / 1,615	$43,950
September 26	Dublin	Ireland	Olympia Theatre	Ryan Mack	1,613 / 1,613	$44,258
September 28	Glasgow	Scotland	O2 Academy Glasgow	Ryan Mack	2,243 / 2,550	$55,157
September 29	Manchester	England	O2 Apollo Manchester	Ryan Mack	—N/a	—N/a
October 1	London	England	Brixton Academy	Ryan Mack	—N/a	—N/a
October 2	Birmingham	England	O2 Academy Birmingham	Ryan Mack	—N/a	—N/a
October 4	Leeds	England	O2 Academy Leeds	Ryan Mack	—N/a	—N/a
October 5	Nottingham	England	Rock City	Ryan Mack	—N/a	—N/a
October 7	Southampton	England	Southampton Guildhall	Ryan Mack	—N/a	—N/a
October 9	Paris	France	Le Trianon	Ryan Mack	—N/a	—N/a
October 11	Brussels	Belgium	Ancienne Belgique	Ryan Mack	1,506 / 1,935	$38,309
October 12	Cologne	Germany	E-Werk	Ryan Mack	1,891 / 2,000	$55,581
October 13	Tilburg	Netherlands	Poppodium 013	Ryan Mack	—N/a	—N/a
October 14	Munich	Germany	Neue Theaterfabrik	Ryan Mack	1,400 / 1,400	$41,149
October 16	Zurich	Switzerland	X-Tra	Ryan Mack	995 / 1,840	$50,731
October 17	Milan	Italy	Alcatraz	Ryan Mack	—N/a	—N/a
October 19	Berlin	Germany	Huxley's Neue Welt	Ryan Mack	1,566 / 1,600	$46,028
October 20	Warsaw	Poland	Progresja	Ryan Mack	—N/a	—N/a

== Cancelled dates ==
List of cancelled concerts, showing date, city, country, venue and reason for cancellation
Date	City	Country	Venue	Reason
September 13, 2021	Oklahoma City	United States	Zoo Amphitheatre	COVID-19 safety restrictions, rescheduled to June 2022
May 10, 2022	Cincinnati	United States	Riverbend Music Center	Danger of flooding, rescheduled to one week later
October 22, 2022	Moscow	Russia	1930 Moscow Concert Hall	Russian invasion of Ukraine
