= Somewhere in the Sky Tour =

2025 concert tour by AJR

- Tour by AJR
- Promotional poster for the tour
- Location: North America
- Associated album: What No One's Thinking; AJR: Live From The Hollywood Bowl
- Start date: July 18, 2025
- End date: October 4, 2025
- No. of shows: 16
- Supporting acts: Cavetown; Goth Babe; Quinn XCII; Chelsea Cutler; Valley; Elio Mei; Lawerence; Ryley Tate Wilson; Ben Steer; Beach Weather; Alexander Stewart

AJR concert chronology
- The Maybe Man Tour (2024); Somewhere in the Sky Tour (2025)

Somewhere in the Sky Tour was the seventh concert tour by American pop band AJR. The tour began on July 18, 2025, in Sparks, Nevada, and ended on October 4, 2025, in Los Angeles, California. The tour features 16 shows across the United States and Canada.

== Background ==
The tour was announced in March 2025 via AJR's social media platforms and their official website. According to the band, the tour will showcase a blend of theatrical storytelling, interactive lighting effects, and new arrangements of their chart-topping songs.

AJR revealed a rotating lineup of opening acts throughout the tour, with several artists joining on select dates. The support acts include indie-pop performers Cavetown, Valley, and Elio Mei, with additional openers include Quinn XCII, Lawrence, Beach Weather, Goth Babe, Chelsea Cutler, Ben Steer, and Ryley Tate Wilson.

AJR also added two additional shows to the tour schedule: July 18, 2025, in Sparks, Nevada, and August 12, 2025, in Toronto, Ontario, both of which expanded the North American leg.

On June 3, 2025, AJR announced that they would be heading to China for the first time to perform at the MTA Festival in Hebei, marking their debut show in the country.

During their set at the MTA Festival in Hebei on June 29, AJR performed the unreleased song "Betty" live for the first time.

== Set list ==
This set list is representative of the July 18, 2025 show in Sparks, Nevada. It does not represent all concerts for the tour.

1. "Way Less Sad" / Intro
2. "Karma"
3. Crowd Interaction (Pt. 1)
4. "Yes I'm a Mess"
5. "The Good Part"
6. "Betty"
7. "100 Bad Days" (Making Of)
8. "Burn The House Down"
9. Crowd Interaction (Pt. 2)
10. "Bang!"
11. "Inertia"
12. "World's Smallest Violin"
13. "Wow, I'm Not Crazy"
14. Mashup (includes: "Come Hang Out", "I'm Not Famous", "I'm Ready", "Break My Face", "Finale (Can't Wait to See What You Do Next)")
15. "Steve's Going To London"
16. "Sober Up"
17. "Weak" / Marching Band Outro ("Bang!" & "100 Bad Days" reprise)

== Tour dates ==
Somewhere in the Sky Tour dates
Date (2025)	City	Country	Venue	Attendance	Revenue	Opening act(s)
North America
July 18	Sparks	United States	Nugget Event Center	~5,000	TBA	Beach Weather
July 20	Mountain View	United States	Shoreline Amphitheatre	TBA		Quinn XCII, Cavetown, Valley, Elio Mei
July 22	West Valley City	United States	Utah First Credit Union Amphitheatre	TBA		Cavetown, Valley, Elio Mei
July 24	Englewood	United States	Fiddler's Green Amphitheatre	~17,000	TBA	Cavetown, Valley, Elio Mei
July 26	Maryland Heights	United States	Hollywood Casino Amphitheatre	TBA		Quinn XCII, Lawrence, Valley, Elio Mei
July 27	Tinley Park	United States	Credit Union 1 Amphitheatre	~14,000	TBA	Lawrence, Cavetown, Valley, Elio Mei
July 29	Clarkston	United States	Pine Knob Music Theatre	~15,000	TBA	Goth Babe, Cavetown, Valley, Elio Mei
July 31	Noblesville	United States	Ruoff Music Center	TBA		Goth Babe, Cavetown, Valley, Elio Mei
August 2	Charlotte	United States	PNC Music Pavilion	TBA		Goth Babe, Cavetown, Valley, Ryley Tate Wilson
August 4	Alpharetta	United States	Ameris Bank Amphitheatre	TBA		Goth Babe, Cavetown, Valley, Ryley Tate Wilson
August 6	Camden	United States	Freedom Mortgage Pavilion	TBA		Goth Babe, Cavetown, Valley, Elio Mei
August 8	Wantagh	United States	Northwell Health at Jones Beach Theater	TBA		Chelsea Cutler, Goth Babe, Valley, Elio Mei
August 9	Mansfield	United States	Xfinity Center	TBA		Cavetown, Valley, Elio Mei
August 10	Columbia	United States	Merriweather Post Pavilion	~15,000	TBA	Chelsea Cutler, Cavetown, Valley, Ben Steer
August 12	Toronto	Canada	Budweiser Stage	~9,000	TBA	Alexander Stewart, Cavetown
October 4	Los Angeles	United States	Hollywood Bowl	~17,000	TBA	Goth Babe, Valley, Elio Mei

=== Festivals and other shows ===
Festival & Other Shows (2025)
Date (2025)	City	Country	Venue	Attendance	Revenue	Opening act(s)
North America
March 6 (Note: Part of Houston Livestock Show and Rodeo)	Houston	United States	NRG Stadium	54,901/72,220	TBA	N/A
March 8 (Note: Part of Sips and Sounds Festival)	Austin	United States	Auditorium Shores	TBA		Festival lineup
Asia
June 29 (Note: Part of MTA Desert Music Festival. AJR performed "Betty" live for the first time.)	Hebei	China	Mustafar Stage	TBA		N/A
North America
August 1 (Note: Part of Ohio State Fair)	Columbus	United States	Ohio Expo Center	~10,000/10,000	TBA	Valley
August 3 (Note: Part of 107.5 The River's *River on the Rooftop* series, hosted at Virgin Hotels Nashville’s *Pool Club*.)	Nashville	United States	The Pool Club (Virgin Hotels)	TBA		Knox, Jonah Marais, Harper Grace
August 21 (Note: Part of Great New York State Fair)	Syracuse	United States	Suburban Park, Great New York State Fair	~24,000	TBA	Festival appearance
September 18 (Note: Part of Washington State Fair)	Puyallup	United States	Washington State Fair	~8,000/10,386	TBA	Em Beihold, Avery Cochrane
October 3 (Note: Part of Arizona State Fair)	Phoenix	United States	Arizona State Fairgrounds	TBA		TBA
December 8 (Note: Part of WNCI 97.9 Acoustic Chrismukkah)	Columbus	United States	Newport Music Hall	1,700/1,700	TBA	The Orphan The Poet & Ray Jones
December 9 (Note: Part of *Twisted with AJR & Wet Leg* tour)	Chicago	United States	Byline Bank Aragon Ballroom	TBA		Wet Leg, Out in Front
December 11 (Note: Part of ALT 94.7 Electric Christmas)	Lincoln	United States	Thunder Valley Casino Resort	TBA		Almost Monday, Out in Front
December 13 (Note: Part of *Mix 104.1 Deck the Hall Ball*)	Boston	United States	Agganis Arena	TBA		Festival appearance
December 15 (Note: Part of Q102 Jingle Ball)	Philadelphia	United States	Wells Fargo Center	TBA		Festival-style lineup including Laufey, Monsta X, Zara Larsson, BigXthaPlug, Ravyn Lenae, Alex Warren, Myles Smith
December 16 (Note: Part of HOT 99.5 Jingle Ball)	Washington, D.C.	United States	Capital One Arena	TBA		Festival-style lineup including Nelly, Jelly Roll, Conan Gray, Shinedown, Olivia Dean, Zara Larsson, Myles Smith, Laufey, Monsta X, Alex Warren
December 17 (Note: Part of the GEICO Feel Good Fest, presented by iHeartRadio)	Tampa	United States	Thunder Alley	Free show		Festival appearance
December 31 (Note: Part of Dick Clark's New Year's Rockin' Eve 2026)	New York City	United States	Times Square	TBA		Televised performance

Festival & Other Shows (2026)
Date (2026)	City	Country	Venue	Attendance	Revenue	Opening act(s)
North America
May 23 (Note: Part of BottleRock Napa Valley 2026)	Napa	United States	Napa Valley Expo	TBA		Festival appearance — part of multi-day BottleRock Napa Valley festival
June 6 (Note: Part of Let’s Go Fest 2026)	Crownsville	United States	Anne Arundel County Fairgrounds	TBA		Festival lineup
June 26	Idaho Falls	United States	Mountain America Center	TBA		Hobo Johnson
June 27	Colorado Springs	United States	Ford Amphitheater	TBA		Hobo Johnson and Sophie Grey
June 29 (Note: First night of a two-night run at Red Rocks Amphitheatre.)	Morrison	United States	Red Rocks Amphitheatre	9,525/9,525	TBA	Arden Jones and Avery Cochran
June 30 (Note: Second night of a two-night run at Red Rocks Amphitheatre.)	Morrison	United States	Red Rocks Amphitheatre	9,525/9,525	TBA	The Happy Fits and Avery Cochrane
July 1 (Note: Part of the San Diego County Fair (Toyota Summer Concert Series))	Del Mar	United States	Del Mar Fairgrounds – Corona Grandstand Stage	TBA		Fair concert series
July 8	Bend	United States	Hayden Homes Amphitheater	TBA		Izzy Escobar and Sophie Grey
July 10	Nampa	United States	Ford Idaho Center Arena	TBA		Izzy Escobar
July 11 (Note: Part of Blessing in Disguise 2026)	Spokane	United States	One Spokane Stadium	TBA		Festival lineup
August 9 (Note: Part of Musikfest 2026)	Bethlehem	United States	Wind Creek Steel Stage	~6,300/6,400	TBA	Ryley Tate and David Wimbish & The Collection
August 12 (Note: Part of Orange County Fair)	Costa Mesa	United States	Pacific Amphitheatre	~6,000/8,000	TBA	The Happy Fits and Avery Cochrane
August 15 (Note: Part of Wisconsin State Fair)	West Allis	United States	Uline Warehouse Stage, Wisconsin State Fair	~10,000/12,000	TBA	Em Beihold
August 19 (Note: Part of the Iowa State Fair 2026)	Des Moines	United States	Iowa State Fair Grandstand	7,554/17,000	TBA	Em Beihold
August 21 (Note: Part of Alaska State Fair 2026)	Palmer	United States	borealis theater	~5,100/5,200	TBA	Festival appearance
September 1	Council Bluffs	United States	Harrah's Stir Cove	3,764/4,000	TBA	Arden Jones
September 2 (Note: Part of the Minnesota State Fair Grandstand Concert Series)	Falcon Heights	United States	Minnesota State Fair Grandstand	7,533/17,000	TBA	Quinn XCII and Avery Cochran
