= Neotheater World Tour =

2019–2020 concert tour by AJR

- Tour by AJR
- Promotional poster for the tour
- Location: Europe; North America
- Associated album: Neotheater
- Start date: September 20, 2019
- End date: January 21, 2020
- No. of shows: 42
- Supporting acts: Tessa Violet; Michael Blume; Flora Cash; Flawes; Almost Monday
- Attendance: 105,357 (Note: Attendance over the reported 26 dates); 130,000+
- Box office: $4,264,056 (Note: Amount grossed over the reported 26 dates)

AJR concert chronology
- The Click Tour (2018); Neotheater World Tour (2019–2020); OK Orchestra Tour (2021–2022)

The Neotheater World Tour was the fourth concert tour by the American pop band AJR, supporting their third studio album, Neotheater (2019). It ran from September 20, 2019, to January 21, 2020, and covered 42 shows across Europe and North America. The set list consisted primarily of songs from Neotheater, with a few numbers from the band's second album The Click (2017). A second leg of the Neotheater World Tour with 21 more shows was canceled due to the COVID-19 pandemic.

== Background and development ==
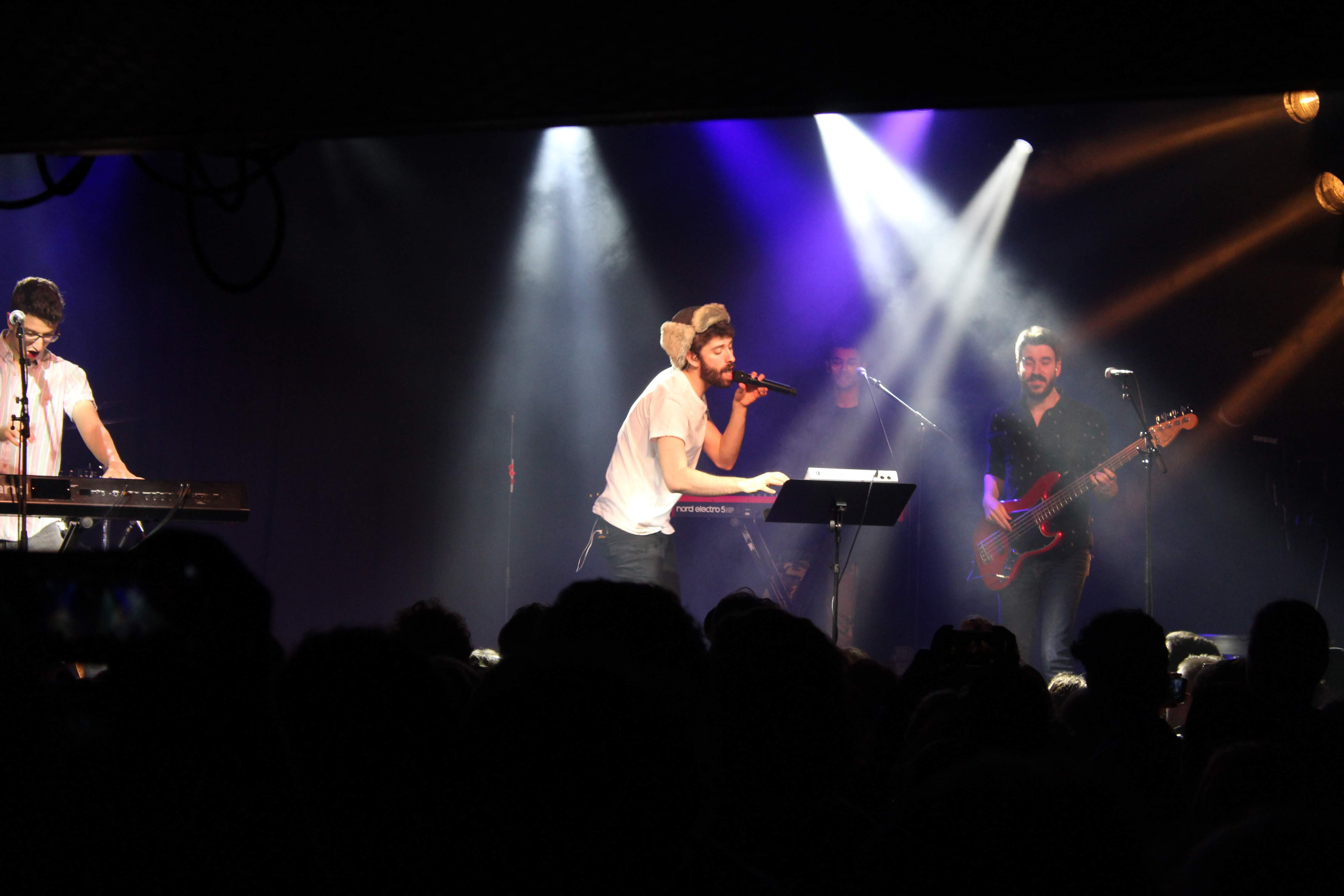
AJR performing in Amsterdam to promote Neotheater.

On March 10, 2019, AJR released a trailer for their third studio album, Neotheater, which would release on April 26. Shortly after this, the band announced the Neotheater World Tour on March 15, with tickets becoming available for sale on March 22. Band member Ryan Met stated in an interview with Atwood Magazine that the tour was conceptualized at the same time as the album, stating "we wanted it to be one whole cohesive piece of art". Two release shows prefaced the tour, with AJR performing at Bowery Ballroom in New York City on April 29 and Hoxton Hall in London on May 14.

The Neotheater World Tour started on September 13 at the Eastern States Exposition in West Springfield, Massachusetts, remaining in the United States through November. In December, AJR traveled to Europe to perform in Russia, Poland, Germany, Belgium, France, the Netherlands, the United Kingdom, and Ireland. Some shows on the tour were opened by Tessa Violet. On November 13, 2019, AJR announced a 2020 leg of the Neotheater World Tour, consisting of 21 dates in the United States and 4 dates in Canada throughout May and June. The leg was scheduled to feature Almost Monday as a supporting act.

On November 19, AJR postponed the final four November shows due to lead singer Jack Met having symptoms of strep throat. These shows were rescheduled to dates in mid-January 2020 as part of the second leg, with tickets going on sale on November 22. Following the outbreak of COVID-19, all the shows in May and June 2020 were canceled alongside the band's Everything Everywhere Tour, which would've taken place in July and August 2020 with Quinn XCII, Hobo Johnson & the LoveMakers, and Ashe as supporting acts.

=== Neotheater World Tour Doc ===
Alongside the development of the tour, AJR released Neotheater World Tour Doc, a five-episode documentary series that was directed by Austin Roa and published to YouTube between October 2, 2019, and January 6, 2020. Episodes ranged 7–14 minutes in length and showcased rehearsals, fan interactions, concert highlights, backstage footage, and hardships with the tour.

Episode	Directed by	Original release date	Length (minutes)
1	Austin Roa	October 2, 2019	9:19
AJR finalizes the tour's six-month development period through September 2019 with rehearsals, guiding a production team on visual effects for various sections of the show including "Bud Like You". Session and touring musician JJ Kirkpatrick gives a backstory on his career, and band member Adam Met campaigns at a climate strike in Omaha, Nebraska.
2	Austin Roa	October 17, 2019	14:27
The band experiences technical difficulties with the video wall at Shrine Expo Hall, delaying the tour's third concert by over 23 minutes. They perform more shows from late September through early October, showcasing fan interactions and testimonials. Earlier rehearsals are shown for "Sober Up". AJR spends a day off kart racing and holds a ping-pong tournament with the backstage crew. During the tour's concert at the Great Saltair on October 3, a female fan faints, and the show is stopped for the duration of medical treatment.
3	Austin Roa	October 30, 2019	13:20
Clips of AJR's performances at Red Rocks Amphitheatre and Radio City Music Hall are highlighted, with the latter overviewing the concert's preparation. More fan interactions are shown, and the band holds a dodgeball tournament with the backstage crew. Jack sprains his ankle on-stage in Grand Rapids, Michigan, though the show is still performed as scheduled.
4	Austin Roa	December 4, 2019	11:47
The episode begins with footage of AJR recording a new song, featuring whistles, claps, trumpet, and bass. This would later be released as "Bummerland" on August 31, 2020. At the Criterion in Oklahoma City, a technical failure delays the concert briefly. After more fan interactions and tour highlights are shown, the band goes to Walt Disney World. On November 19, Jack showed symptoms of strep throat, leading to the cancellation of the night's show at Shea's Performing Arts Center to prevent the singer from getting vocal cord nodules. After a hospital visit, Jack tests negative for strep and receives a recommendation to get imaging at a specialized facility.
5	Austin Roa	January 6, 2020	7:45
In Europe, the band performs the tour's December shows and interacts with fans, later recording a video for a climate change campaign. A montage of Europe concert highlights is shown before a text monologue ending the series.

== Set list ==
1. "Next Up Forever"
2. "Birthday Party"
3. "Sober Up"
4. "The Entertainment's Here"
5. "Netflix Trip"
6. "Break My Face"
7. "Come Hang Out"
8. "Weak"
9. "Karma"
10. Interlude ("Three-Thirty" / "I'm Not Famous" / "No Grass Today" / "Pretender" / "Call My Dad" / "Growing Old on Bleecker Street" / "I'm Ready" / "Bud Like You" / "Let the Games Begin" / "Beats")
11. "Turning Out Pt. ii" / "Turning Out"
12. "Wow, I'm Not Crazy"
13. How We Made / "Don't Throw Out My Legos"
14. "Dear Winter"
15. "Burn the House Down"

Encore

16. "Finale (Can't Wait To See What You Do Next)"
17. "100 Bad Days"

== Tour dates ==
List of 2019 concerts
Date (2019)	City	Country	Venue	Opening act	Attendance	Revenue
September 13	West Springfield	United States	The Eastern States Exposition	—N/a (Note: Headlining festival performance; other acts included Brynn Cartelli and Mariachi Mexico Antiguo.)	—N/a	—N/a
September 20	Council Bluffs	United States	Harrah's Stir Cove	Tessa Violet	3,500 / 3,500	$124,375
September 26	Los Angeles	United States	Shrine Expo Hall	Tessa Violet	4,104 / 4,820	$153,662
September 28	San Francisco	United States	Bill Graham Civic Auditorium	Tessa Violet	6,005 / 6,500	$237,352
September 30	Seattle	United States	The Paramount Theatre	Tessa Violet	2,763 / 2,779	$104,011
October 1	Portland	United States	Theater of the Clouds	Tessa Violet	3,823 / 3,946	$120,773
October 3	Salt Lake City	United States	The Great Saltair	Tessa Violet	5,389 / 6,550	$169,612
October 5	Morrison	United States	Red Rocks Amphitheatre	Tessa Violet	7,731 / 7,731	$403,763
October 10	New York City	United States	Radio City Music Hall	Michael Blume	5,637 / 5,637	$290,011
October 16	Detroit	United States	The Fillmore	Michael Blume	2,746 / 2,749	$106,579
October 18	Columbus	United States	Express Live! Amphitheatre	Michael Blume	5,200 / 5,200	$183,600
October 19	Indianapolis	United States	Indiana Farmers Coliseum	Michael Blume	5,831 / 5,831	$178,298
October 20	Grand Rapids	United States	20 Monroe Live	Michael Blume	—N/a	—N/a
October 22	Minneapolis	United States	Armory	Michael Blume	5,139 / 5,139	$179,309
October 23	Madison	United States	The Sylvee	Michael Blume	2,414 / 2,454	$94,923
October 25	Kansas City	United States	Uptown Theater	Michael Blume	2,847 / 2,847	$92,453
October 26	St. Louis	United States	The Pageant	Michael Blume	2,000 / 2,000	$74,543
October 27	Oklahoma City	United States	The Criterion	Michael Blume	2,825 / 3,170	$94,220
October 29	Dallas	United States	Toyota Music Factory	Michael Blume	3,682 / 4,258	$129,454
October 30	Austin	United States	ACL Live	Michael Blume	2,500 / 2,536	$97,800
October 31	Houston	United States	Revention Music Center	Michael Blume	—N/a	—N/a
November 6	New Orleans	United States	The Fillmore	Flora Cash	1,899 / 2,087	$65,950
November 8	Orlando	United States	Hard Rock Cafe	Flora Cash	2,946 / 2,946	$104,320
November 9	Tampa	United States	Yuengling Center	Flora Cash	5,512 / 5,907	$176,156
November 12	Atlanta	United States	Infinite Energy Center	Flora Cash	—N/a	—N/a
November 14	Philadelphia	United States	Metropolitan Opera House	Flora Cash	7,346 / 7,768	$592,949
November 15	Philadelphia	United States	Metropolitan Opera House	Flora Cash	—N/a	—N/a
November 16	Boston	United States	Agganis Arena	Flora Cash	5,669 / 5,729	$237,850
December 1	Moscow	Russia	1930 Moscow	Flawes	—N/a	—N/a
December 3	Warsaw	Poland	Niebo	Flawes	—N/a	—N/a
December 4	Berlin	Germany	Kesselhaus in der Kulturbrauerei	Flawes	—N/a	—N/a
December 6	Antwerp	Belgium	Zappa	Flawes	—N/a	—N/a
December 7	Paris	France	La Maroquinerie	Flawes	—N/a	—N/a
December 8	Amsterdam	Netherlands	Melkweg	Flawes	—N/a	—N/a
December 10	London	United Kingdom	O2 Forum Kentish Town	Flawes	—N/a	—N/a
December 12	Glasgow	United Kingdom	SWG3	Flawes	1,000 / 1,000	$22,627
December 13	Dublin	Ireland	The Academy	Flawes	849 / 849	$16,367
December 14	Manchester	United Kingdom	Manchester Academy	Flawes	—N/a	—N/a

List of 2020 concerts
Date (2020)	City	Country	Venue	Opening act	Attendance	Revenue
January 17	Chicago	United States	Aragon Ballroom	Almost Monday	—N/a	—N/a
January 18	Buffalo	United States	Shea's Performing Arts Center	Almost Monday	—N/a	—N/a
January 20	Washington, D.C.	United States	The Anthem	Almost Monday	6,000 / 6,000	$213,099
January 21	Pittsburgh	United States	UPMC Events Center	Almost Monday	—N/a	—N/a

== Cancelled dates ==
List of cancelled concerts, showing date, city, country, venue and reason for cancellation
Date	City	Country	Venue	Reason
November 19, 2019	Buffalo	United States	Shea's Performing Arts Center	Medical issues, re-scheduled to January 2020.
November 21, 2019	Washington, D.C.	United States	The Anthem	Medical issues, re-scheduled to January 2020.
November 22, 2019	Pittsburgh	United States	UPMC Events Center	Medical issues, re-scheduled to January 2020.
November 23, 2019	Chicago	United States	Aragon Ballroom	Medical issues, re-scheduled to January 2020.
May 6, 2020	Jacksonville	United States	Daily's Place	COVID-19 pandemic
May 8, 2020	Charlotte	United States	Metro Credit Union Amphitheatre	COVID-19 pandemic
May 9, 2020	Raleigh	United States	Red Hat Amphitheater	COVID-19 pandemic
May 10, 2020	Charlottesville	United States	Sprint Pavilion	COVID-19 pandemic
May 12, 2020	Syracuse	United States	Landmark Theater	COVID-19 pandemic
May 13, 2020	Portland	United States	Cross Insurance Arena	COVID-19 pandemic
May 15, 2020	Wallingford	United States	Toyota Oakdale Theatre	COVID-19 pandemic
May 16, 2020	Providence	United States	Bold Point Pavilion	COVID-19 pandemic
May 19, 2020	Louisville	United States	Iroquois Amphitheater	COVID-19 pandemic
May 20, 2020	Cincinnati	United States	PNC Pavilion	COVID-19 pandemic
May 22, 2020	Cleveland	United States	Jacob's Pavilion	COVID-19 pandemic
May 23, 2020	Nashville	United States	Ascend Amphitheater	COVID-19 pandemic
May 24, 2020	Birmingham	United States	Birmingham–Jefferson Convention Complex	COVID-19 pandemic
May 27, 2020	Wichita	United States	Hartman Arena	COVID-19 pandemic
May 29, 2020	Des Moines	United States	Water Works Park	COVID-19 pandemic
May 30, 2020	Milwaukee	United States	BMO Harris Pavilion	COVID-19 pandemic
May 31, 2020	Green Bay	United States	Resch Center	COVID-19 pandemic
June 2, 2020	Winnipeg	Canada	Burton Cummings Theatre	COVID-19 pandemic
June 4, 2020	Calgary	Canada	MacEwan Hall	COVID-19 pandemic
June 5, 2020	Edmonton	Canada	Northern Alberta Jubilee Auditorium	COVID-19 pandemic
June 7, 2020	Vancouver	Canada	Queen Elizabeth Theatre	COVID-19 pandemic
June 9, 2020	Boise	United States	CenturyLink Arena	COVID-19 pandemic
June 11, 2020	San Diego	United States	California Coast Credit Union	COVID-19 pandemic
June 12, 2020	Las Vegas	United States	The Cosmopolitan	COVID-19 pandemic
June 13, 2020	Phoenix	United States	Comerica Theater	COVID-19 pandemic
