= 3 O'Clock Things =

2021 song by AJR

Song by AJR

from the album OK Orchestra
- Released: March 26, 2021
- Genre: Pop; electropop; jazz
- Length: 3:48
- Label: AJR; BMG
- Songwriters: Jack Met; Adam Met; Ryan Met
- Producer: Ryan Met

Music video
- "3 O'Clock Things" on YouTube

"3 O'Clock Things" is a song by American pop band AJR from their fourth studio album OK Orchestra, appearing as the third track. It is the most popular non-single from the album, amassing over 60 million streams as of March 2026.

== Background and composition ==
AJR began writing the song with the intent of creating a "stream of consciousness" song, grabbing thoughts that would be had at 3 AM and weighing if others would have an instant feeling from it. Each line is taken from different one-sided perspectives, with the song's final line "if you're fuckin' racist, then don't come to my show" tying in as one thought given as a fact rather than an uncertainty. During live performances, the line is often shouted by the audience.

"3 O'Clock Things" is composed in 4/4 time signature in the key of B major and follows a tempo of 94 beats per minute (bpm). The song's intro and bridge vocal melodies were inspired by close-harmony choirs featured in the 1940s jump blues song "Boogie Woogie Bugle Boy", similarly to the band's previous album, Neotheater, which took inspiration from 1930s barbershop quartets. The Beu Sisters perform these vocal sections in "3 O'Clock Things".

== Music video ==
On June 23, 2021, a video directed by Jack Met and Edoardo Ranaboldo was released. The music video features AJR absent of Jack, with the band's lighting designer Ezra Donellan taking his place. Donellan recreates scenes from previous AJR music videos with the other members, including "I'm Not Famous", "Dear Winter", "Sober Up", "Bang!", "My Play", "Bummerland", "Way Less Sad", "OK Overture", "Come Hang Out", and "Weak", while additionally recreating a Jimmy Kimmel Live! performance of "Way Less Sad" and an interview with Zach Sang. The music video's audio was mixed with 360 Reality Audio, which was released onto streaming services the next day.

== Personnel ==
Credits adapted from Tidal.

- Adam Met – vocals, instruments, composer
- Jack Met – lead vocals, instruments, composer
- Ryan Met – vocals, instruments, composer, producer
- The Beu Sisters – vocals
- Chris Gehringer – mastering engineer
- Joe Zook – mixing engineer
- Chris Berry - drums
- Arnetta Johnson - trumpet
- Josh Plotner - flute
- Danny Ferenbach - violin
- Emelia Suljic - violin
- Ruth Kornblatt-Stier - cello
- Alba Avoricani - backing vocals

== Charts ==
Weekly chart performance for "3 O'Clock Things"
Chart (2021)	Peak position
New Zealand Hot Singles (RMNZ)	39
US Hot Rock & Alternative Songs (Billboard)	28
