= List of 2023 AJR festival shows =

AJR live performances in 2023
- AJR performing in Powidz, Poland in 2023
- Music festivals: 13
- Mercury World Tour openings: 9
- Headline shows: 7
- Broadcast appearances: 6
- Other performances: 3

In 2023, American pop band AJR performed various shows without an ongoing concert tour, taking place between the OK Orchestra Tour (2021–2022) and the Maybe Man Tour (2024). They primarily played various festivals and appeared as an opening act for the final leg of Imagine Dragons' Mercury World Tour. The year saw their first shows in Asia, including a broadcast performance with Seo Eun-kwang. In addition, they headlined a series of special performances in the United States with support from Chelsea Cutler, Lawrence, Livingston, Jeremy Zucker, Em Beihold, and Almost Monday.

In early July, the band's father died. AJR publicly announced the death and took time away from touring to grieve and support family, leading to the cancellation of several scheduled appearances, including their headlining performance at Summerfest, NBA Con in Las Vegas, and Roc the Lake Music Festival. AJR wrapped up the year with performances for KIIS-FM's Jingle Ball in Los Angeles, and Y100's Jingle Ball in Florida.

== History ==
AJR's first concert of 2023 came as part of headlining the Beale Street Music Festival, playing one of its main stages on May 7. They continued with a baseball post-game concert on May 19 for the Tampa Bay Rays home game against the Milwaukee Brewers, and an appearance on May 20 at Hangout Music Festival. AJR then traveled to Asia to perform at Greenroom Festival in Japan on May 27 and the Seoul Jazz Festival in South Korea on May 28. Band member Jack Met and touring member Arnetta Johnson performed acoustic renditions of "The Dumb Song" and "World's Smallest Violin" for the radio show Bae Cheol-soo's Music Camp on May 29, preceding a full band performance later the same day of "The Dumb Song" with Seo Eun-kwang for the television channel JTBC. AJR returned to the United States for a headlining show on June 9 at Westville Music Bowl, featuring Chelsea Cutler as an opening act, followed by another baseball post-game concert on June 10 for the Philadelphia Phillies home game against the Los Angeles Dodgers.

The band performed a headlining show opened by Lawrence and Livingston on June 23 at MegaCorp Pavilion, then played a concert at Weidner Field on June 24 with support from Jeremy Zucker, Em Beihold, and Almost Monday. Through July, AJR was scheduled to perform at Summerfest on July 6, Roc the Lake Music Festival on July 7, and open for Imagine Dragons on July 8. They were initially an opener for Imagine Dragons at Summerfest before later being designated a headliner to replace Jimmy Buffett. On July 1, the band disclosed via social media that their father's health was worsening, simultaneously announcing the cancellation of all shows in July to spend time with him. The same day as his death on July 3, they surprise released the single "God Is Really Real".

Em Beihold returned to support AJR for their performance at the Orange County Fair on August 2, followed by the band headlining the preview night of Musikfest on August 3. Starting on August 5, AJR began performing as a supporting act of Imagine Dragons' Mercury World Tour, appearing on 9 dates in Europe through August and September. In-between these shows, the band additionally played at Sziget Festival on August 13, FM4 Frequency Festival on August 19, and Zürich Openair on August 23. They finished their set of shows in Europe with Lollapalooza Berlin on September 10, headlining Abercrombie & Fitch's Challenge fundraiser in the United States on September 22. They performed two release shows for The Maybe Man (2023) on November 12.

== Show dates ==
List of 2023 concerts
Date (2023)	City	Country	Venue	Attendance	Revenue	Type
United States
May 7	Memphis	United States	Beale Street Music Festival	—N/a		Festival
May 19	St. Petersburg	United States	Tropicana Field	—N/a		Baseball post-game concert
May 20	Gulf Shores	United States	Hangout Music Festival	—N/a		Festival
Asia
May 27	Yokohama	Japan	Greenroom Festival	—N/a		Festival
May 28	Seoul	South Korea	Seoul Jazz Festival	—N/a		Festival
May 29	Seoul	South Korea	Bae Cheol-soo's Music Camp	—N/a		Broadcast performance
May 29	Seoul	South Korea	JTBC Studios	—N/a		Broadcast performance
United States
June 9	New Haven	United States	Westville Music Bowl	—N/a		Headline show
June 10	Philadelphia	United States	Citizens Bank Park	—N/a		Baseball post-game concert
June 23	Newport	United States	MegaCorp Pavilion	4,321 / 6,500	$231,763	Headline show
June 24	Colorado Springs	United States	Weidner Field	—N/a		Headline show
August 2	Costa Mesa	United States	Orange County Fair	8,088 / 8,088	$570,836	Headline show
August 3	Bethlehem	United States	Musikfest	6,400 / 6,400	—N/a	Festival
Europe & Middle East
August 5	Rome	Italy	Circus Maximus	68,494 / 68,570	$5,034,088	Opened for Imagine Dragons
August 8	Pula	Croatia	Pula Arena	8,156 / 8,167	$739,097	Opened for Imagine Dragons
August 9	Pula	Croatia	Pula Arena	8,168 / 8,189	$740,133	Opened for Imagine Dragons
August 13	Budapest	Hungary	Sziget Festival	—N/a		Festival
August 14	Warsaw	Poland	Stadion Narodowy	54,403 / 54,543	$4,597,699	Opened for Imagine Dragons
August 16	Vilnius	Lithuania	Vingis Park	42,013 / 42,185	$3,613,291	Opened for Imagine Dragons
August 19	Sankt Pölten	Austria	Green Park	50,000 / 50,000	$3,555,000	Festival
August 22	Paris	France	Paris La Défense Arena	40,290 / 40,340	$3,816,850	Opened for Imagine Dragons
August 23	Zurich	Switzerland	Zürich Openair	—N/a		Festival
August 29	Tel Aviv	Israel	Yarkon Park	59,051 / 59,148	$6,598,855	Opened for Imagine Dragons
September 6	Athens	Greece	Athens Olympic Sports Complex	—N/a		Opened for Imagine Dragons
September 8	Chambord	France	Château de Chambord	—N/a		Opened for Imagine Dragons
September 10	Berlin	Germany	Lollapalooza Berlin	—N/a		Festival
United States
September 22	New Albany	United States	Abercrombie & Fitch Home Office	—N/a		Festival
November 2	New York City	United States	SiriusXM Studios	—N/a		Broadcast performance
November 4	Las Vegas	United States	SEMA Fest	—N/a		Festival
November 9	New York City	United States	The Tonight Show Starring Jimmy Fallon	—N/a		Broadcast performance
November 9	Brooklyn	United States	Amazon Music Studios	—N/a		Recording of AJR: City Sessions (2024)
November 10	New York City	United States	Live with Kelly and Mark	—N/a		Broadcast performance
November 12	New York City	United States	Madison Square Park	—N/a		Headline show
November 12	New York City	United States	Irving Plaza (Note: Special The Maybe Man album release show.)	1,200 / 1,200	TBA	Headline show
November 16	New York City	United States	Rough Trade Records	—N/a		Headline show
December 1	Inglewood	United States	Kia Forum (Note: Part of the KIIS FM Jingle Ball)	16,654 / 16,654	$2,206,928	Festival
December 16	Sunrise	United States	Amerant Bank Arena (Note: Part of the Y100 Jingle Ball)	—N/a		Festival
December 17	Universal City	United States	The Voice	—N/a		Broadcast performance

== Cancelled dates ==
Cancelled shows
Date	City	Country	Venue	Reason
July 6	Milwaukee	United States	Summerfest (American Family Insurance Amphitheater)	Illness and death of AJR's father
July 7	Canandaigua	United States	Roc the Lake Music Festival (Constellation Brands – Marvin Sands Performing Arts Center)	Illness and death of AJR's father
July 8	Milwaukee	United States	Summerfest (American Family Insurance Amphitheater)	Illness and death of AJR's father
July 9	Las Vegas	United States	NBA Con (Las Vegas Convention Center)	Illness and death of AJR's father
July 12	Ottawa	Canada	RBC Ottawa Bluesfest (LeBreton Flats)	Illness and death of AJR's father
July 13	Calgary	Canada	Calgary Stampede (Coca‑Cola Stage / Big Four Roadhouse)	Illness and death of AJR's father
July 15	Minneapolis	United States	Target Field	Illness and death of AJR's father
