= Don't Throw Out My Legos =

2019 song by AJR

Song by AJR

from the album Neotheater
- Released: April 26, 2019
- Recorded: 2018
- Genre: Electropop
- Length: 4:10
- Label: AJR Productions; S-Curve
- Songwriter(s): Jack Met; Ryan Met
- Producer(s): Ryan Met

Audio
- "Don't Throw Out My Legos" on YouTube

Music video
- "Don't Throw Out My Legos" on Vimeo

"Don't Throw Out My Legos" is a song by American pop band AJR, appearing as the fourth track on their third studio album Neotheater. It uses an upbeat keyboard-based instrumental while discussing the difficulty of growing up.

== Background ==
"Don't Throw Out My Legos" was the second song written for Neotheater, preceded by "Karma" and followed by "Next Up Forever". The song describes the emotional hardships of moving away from one's parents, with the band struggling to conform to the social construct of adulthood. Rolling Stone praised the track's personality as "a saccharine but strangely affecting ode to lost innocence". "Don't Throw Out My Legos" was the first song showcased of Neotheater, receiving live performances during the AJR's The Click tour in 2018. The lyric "People want shirts with the band name on it" would later inspire a shirt design with plain white color and "The Band Name" as lettering.

== Composition and production ==
During the Neotheater World Tour, AJR visualized the layers of the chorus for "Don't Throw Out My Legos". The song's production began from sampling the sound of car keys being dropped, being pitched up an octave and combined with a drum beat in 3/4 time signature and at a tempo of 147 beats per minute. The song's snare drum takes inspiration from the snare of the Beatles' "Penny Lane". This composition was then shifted into 4/4 time signature and included piano in the key of D major. Following the addition of bass and hi-hats, the band incorporated the Neotheater's theme of orchestral sampling by creating a melody out of viola and close harmony choirs to complete the chorus. The pre-chorus and bridge of "Don't Throw Out My Legos" are piano-based with an ascending beat that leads into the chorus. Riff Magazine compared these chord progressions to music from Mister Rogers' Neighborhood.

== Music video ==
A music video for "Don't Throw Out My Legos" was released on Vimeo and Spotify, with the former being a widescreen video and the latter being a vertical canvas of the same footage. It features the band and other studio personnel creating and performing the song, interspersed with clips of the band relaxing in-studio with their Bouvier dog Shay.

== Personnel ==
Credits adapted from Tidal.

- Adam Met – bass, backing vocals
- Jack Met – lead vocals, instruments
- Ryan Met – instruments, backing vocals, production, programming
- Chris Gehringer – mastering engineer
- Joe Zook – mixing engineer
- Drew Allsbrook – mixing engineer
- JJ Kirkpatrick – trumpet
- Chris Berry – drums

== Charts ==
Weekly chart performance for "Don't Throw Out My Legos"
Chart (2019)	Peak position
US Hot Rock & Alternative Songs (Billboard)	26
