= Elio Mei =

American singer-songwriter (born 2002)

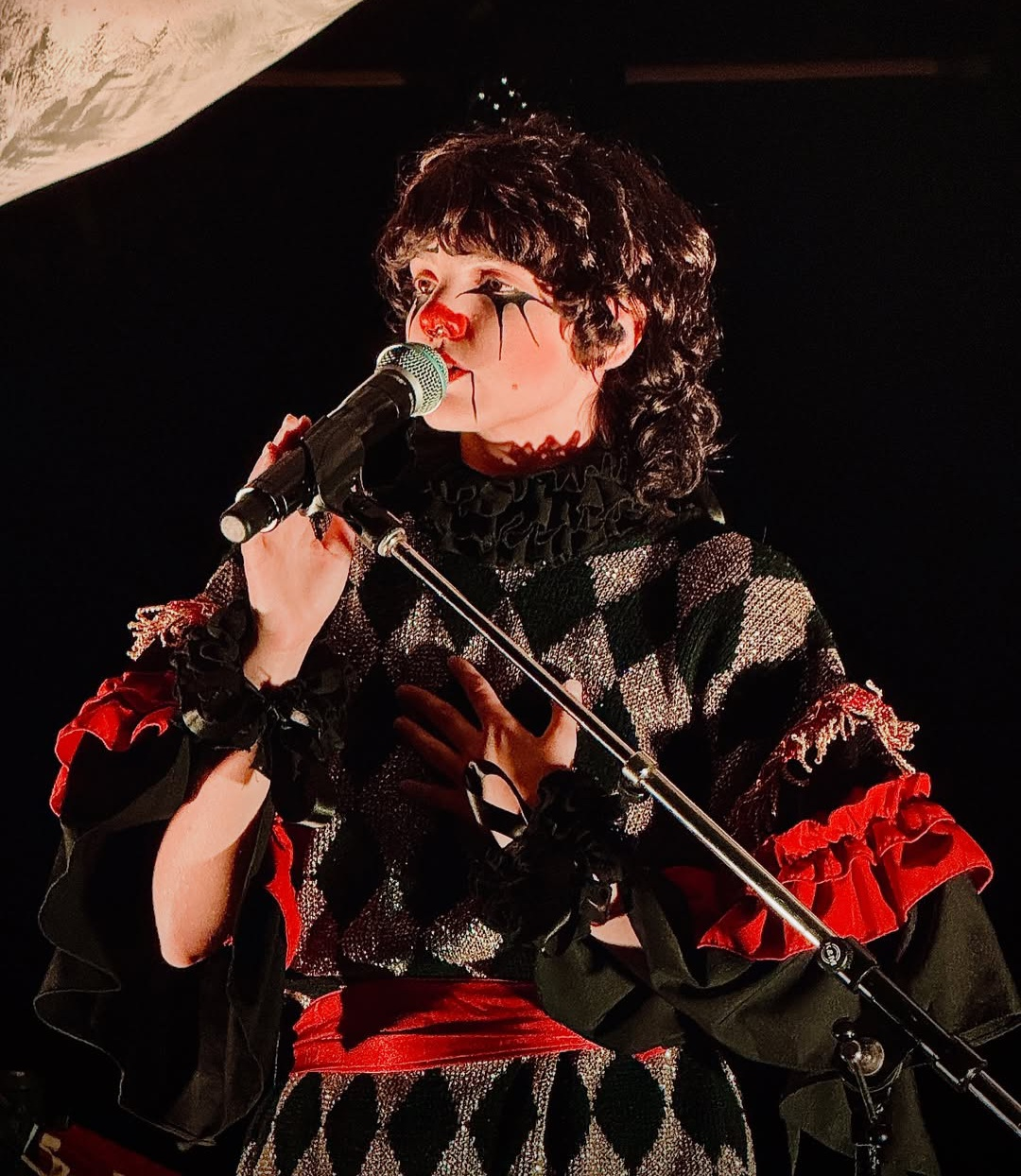
- Mei in 2025

Background information
- Born: November 23, 2002 (age 23); Queen Creek, Arizona, U.S.
- Origin: San Tan Valley, Arizona
- Genres: Indie folk; indie pop
- Occupations: Singer-songwriter; musician
- Instruments: Vocals; ukulele
- Years active: 2020–present
- Labels: Mercury; Republic
- Website: www.eliomei.com

Elio Mei (formerly Madilyn Mei, born November 23, 2002) is an American indie-folk and indie-pop singer-songwriter from San Tan Valley, Arizona, whose whimsical, fantasy-themed music first gained traction on TikTok and YouTube in the early 2020s.

== Early life and education ==
Born and raised in Queen Creek, Arizona, just outside Phoenix, Mei went to high school at Heritage Academy Gateway. Mei began writing songs in fifth grade and played coffee-shop gigs by seventh grade while growing up in the Phoenix area. Before pursuing music full-time, he (Note: Mei uses he/they pronouns. This article uses he/him for consistency.) worked retail and built an online audience of more than 160k followers across platforms.

== Career ==
=== 2020–2022: Online breakout ===
Mei released early demo projects and the EP Where No One Knows My Name (2022) while appearing on the lineup of ZONA Music Festival 2022 in Phoenix.

=== 2023: To Exist With You ===
He self-released his debut LP on 23 June 2023 featuring the Addison Grace duet "Sleeping in the Kitchen" and launched his first headlining club dates.

=== Late 2023: Promise You Won't Scream EP ===
A six-track Halloween-season EP was issued on 27 October 2023.

=== 2024: The Bard era and Side Quest Tour ===
Concept EP The Bard (6 September 2024) drew praise for its fantasy storytelling ("Call Me The Bard", "Never the Muse", "Side Quest Song"). The 23-date Side Quest Tour featured immersive cosplay and theatrical staging, documented in a Santa Ana concert review. A Music Connection live review lauded his "gorgeous vocals" and "emotionally intelligent" material.

=== 2025–present: A Thousand Songs About It All: Act 1 ===
He issued the stand-alone singles "Poppin Skittles" and "What's Going On?!" in January and May 2025 respectively, ahead of work on a second LP. On September 8, 2025, Mei performed "What's Going On?!" on Late Show Me Music, a segment of The Late Show With Stephen Colbert, created to shine a light on rising music acts. Mei was one of the openings acts for a few select dates on AJR's Somewhere in the Sky U.S. tour (July–October 2025). His album A Thousand Songs About It All: Act 1 was released on September 12, 2025 which includes a version of "What's Going On?!".

== Personal life ==
Mei uses he/they pronouns. On his gender identity, Mei stated that he is "not sure if I identify more with being gender queer or trans masc, but I’m somewhere in that realm".

== Musical style and influences ==
Critics describe Mei's music as "delicately crafted indie-pop" that blends acoustic instrumentation with bedroom-pop production. His lyrics draw on classic fantasy tropes while maintaining introspective themes of yearning and self-discovery. Live reviews compare his clear soprano to a young Linda Ronstadt and praise his minimalist duo stage setup.

== Collaborations ==
- Addison Grace – duet "Sleeping in the Kitchen" (2023) and shared U.S. tour dates.
- Scrawny (Jesse Dill) – co-writer/producer and co-headliner on the whimsical single "Six Legs (Tippy Tappy Toes)" spotlighted by B-Sides & Badlands.
- cloudkissed – duet “At The Cemetery” from the album “Promise You Won’t Scream”

== Discography ==
=== Studio albums ===
| Title | Release year |
|---|---|
| To Exist With You | 2023 |
| A Thousand Songs About It All: Act 1 | 2025 |

=== Extended-plays ===
| Title | Release year |
|---|---|
| Not An Album | 2020 |
| Where No One Knows My Name | 2022 |
| Promise You Won't Scream | 2023 |
| The Bard | 2024 |

=== Singles ===
==== Primary artist ====
| Title | Release year | Album/EP |
|---|---|---|
| "Stolen Smiles" | 2019 | Not An Album |
| "Knotted Constellations" | 2019 | Not An Album |
| "One Last Hurrah" | 2020 | Non-album singles |
| "Lub Dub" | 2020 | Non-album singles |
| "The Queen" | 2020 | Non-album singles |
| "Let's Be Friends" | 2021 | Non-album singles |
| "APPLE JUICE" | 2022 | Non-album singles |
| "Blue Haired Boy" | 2022 | Where No One Knows My Name |
| "Nepotism" | 2022 | Where No One Knows My Name |
| "Dress Like A Pirate" | 2022 | Where No One Knows My Name |
| "The Chapel" | 2022 | Non-album singles |
| "The Milk Carton" | 2023 | Non-album singles |
| "Sleeping in the Kitchen" (featuring Addison Grace) | 2023 | To Exist With You |
| "Florida" | 2023 | To Exist With You |
| "call me when you land" | 2023 | Non-album single |
| "Kleptomaniacrow" | 2023 | Promise You Won't Scream |
| "Cryptid" | 2023 | Promise You Won't Scream |
| "Sheep in Wolf's Clothing" | 2023 | Promise You Won't Scream |
| "Garden Jargon" | 2024 | Non-album single |
| "Side Quest Song" | 2024 | The Bard |
| "Tho I'm A Tortoise" | 2024 | The Bard |
| "Never The Muse" | 2024 | The Bard |
| "Poppin Skittles" | 2025 | Non-album single |
| "What's Going On?!" | 2025 | A Thousand Songs About It All: Act 1 |
| "At Least I'd Be A Cowboy!" | 2025 | A Thousand Songs About It All: Act 1 |
| "A Can Of Worms" | 2025 | A Thousand Songs About It All: Act 1 |
| "One Man Circus" | 2025 | A Thousand Songs About It All: Act 1 |
| "Elio" | 2026 | Non-album singles |
| “The Maze, The Town, and Me” | 2026 | Non-album singles |
| "Halloween Valentine" | 2026 | Non-album singles |

==== As featured artist ====
| Title | Release year | Album/EP |
|---|---|---|
| "Six Legs (tippy tappy toes)" (Scrawny featuring Elio Mei) | 2023 | Non-album single |
