= Adventure Is Out There =

2021 song by AJR

Song by AJR

from the album OK Orchestra
- Released: March 26, 2021
- Recorded: 2018, 2021
- Genre: Folk-pop
- Length: 3:31
- Label: AJR Productions; S-Curve
- Songwriters: Jack Met; Ryan Met
- Producer: Ryan Met

Audio
- "Adventure Is Out There" on YouTube

"Adventure Is Out There" is a song by American pop band AJR. It appears as the sixth track on the trio's fourth studio album, OK Orchestra. Originally being written for Neotheater, it was officially released on March 26, 2021. It uses an uptempo folk-pop instrumental while describing jealousy of an object's metaphorical freedom.

== Background ==
While AJR wrote their third studio album, the band created "Socks", finishing the song on July 24, 2018. It was intended to be included on Neotheater, but was scrapped from the album. During the late development of OK Orchestra, the band wanted to add a "free-flowing" track to the then-12-song tracklist. AJR decided to finish "Socks", re-writing the track's chorus with the new title "Adventure Is Out There" and making band member Ryan Met the song's lead vocalist.

== Composition and lyrics ==
"Adventure Is Out There" is an upbeat folk-pop song, primarily featuring a Southern-style guitar over the band's signature pop sound. The Globe described this composition as being driven by a "shuffling drum beat", while Iowa State Daily compared it to the band's debut studio album, Living Room (2015). The track lyrically uses losing socks behind as a metaphor for freedom, seeking an optimistic break in routine with inspiration from the album's central theme of holding onto childhood. "Adventure Is Out There" had various inspirations, with the chorus instrumentation taking from First Aid Kit, the verses interpolating a melody pattern from Perry Como's "Seattle", and the song's slide guitar taking from Patches' "Mary Todd".

== Personnel ==
Credits adapted from Tidal.

- Adam Met – bass guitar, instruments, vocals
- Jack Met – instruments, vocals
- Ryan Met – lead vocals, instruments, production, programming
- Chris Gehringer – mastering
- Joe Zook – mixing
- Andrew Sobelsohn – slide guitar
- Alba Avoricani – additional vocals
- Ruth Kornblatt-Stier – cello
- Danny Ferenbach – violin
- Emelia Suljic – violin
- Chris Berry – drums

== Charts ==
Weekly chart performance for "Adventure Is Out There"
Chart (2021)	Peak position
Spain Top 100 Songs	76
