= Goth Babe =

Solo musical project of Griff Washburn

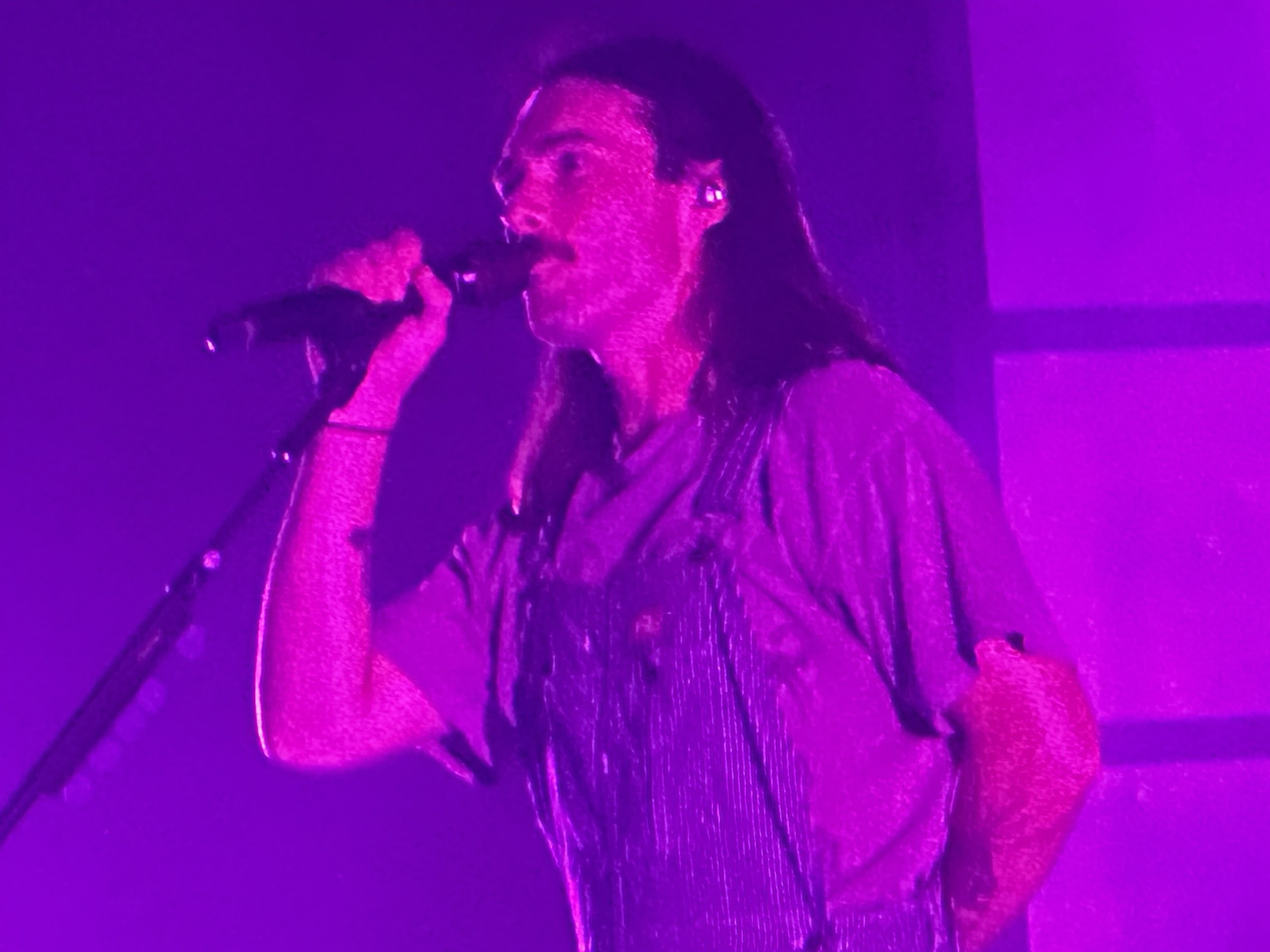
- Washburn in 2024

Background information
- Born: Griffen Washburn
- Origin: Chattanooga, Tennessee
- Genres: Indie rock; chillwave; indie pop; folktronica
- Years active: 2015–present
- Label: Mom + Pop Music
- Website: www.gothbabemusic.com

Goth Babe is the American indie rock solo project of singer-songwriter Griff Washburn.

After releasing a series of singles and EPs, the first Goth Babe album title Lola was released in 2024.

== Early life ==
Washburn was born in Chattanooga, Tennessee, and moved to Nashville to pursue his music career before moving to New York and ultimately to the West Coast.

== Career ==
Washburn released his debut album Lola in 2024. Additionally, Washburn played at Hinterland Music Festival on August 5, 2022. In 2020, he contributed to the benefit compilation The Song is Coming From Inside the House, organized by Strange Ranger to raise funds for Groundswell's Rapid Response Fund in the wake of the COVID-19 pandemic.

== Personal life ==
Washburn has stated he has PTSD after being held up by gunpoint. In 2022, Washburn's home burned down and he lost his iMac with years worth of unreleased music.

Goth Babe discography
- Studio albums: 1
- EPs: 10
- Singles: 19
- Music videos: 7
