= Sophie Grey =

American pianist and producer

Sophie Grey is an American singer, classically trained pianist and record producer, who has released an extended play (EP) entitled "Just Another Sonic Monday™". That EP includes the singles "On Hold" and "Maybe, Baby".

Grey was raised in California and Kansas City.

In 2025 she performed the song "Video Killed the Radio Star" at The Forum, Kentish Town, London with its original singer Trevor Horn.

Artists who Grey has supported include Alison Moyet, Shaggy, and Sting.
