= Break My Face =

2019 song by AJR

- Cover artwork for the apptronic version of "Break My Face"

Single by AJR

from the album Neotheater
- Released: April 26, 2019
- Recorded: 2019
- Genre: Pop; hip hop; EDM
- Length: 3:46, 2:33 (apptronic)
- Label: AJR Productions; S-Curve
- Songwriters: Adam Met; Jack Met; Ryan Met
- Producer: Ryan Met

AJR singles chronology
"Dear Winter" (2019)	"Break My Face" (2019)	"Dear Winter 2.0" (2019)

Audio
- "Break My Face" on YouTube

Music video
- "Break My Face" (Apptronic Version) on YouTube

"Break My Face" is a song by American pop band AJR. Released on April 26, 2019, the track appears fifth on their third studio album, Neotheater (2019). It was distributed via the band's label AJR Productions and S-Curve, additionally receiving an Amazon Music exclusive version as a promotional single and music video on August 15. The song utilizes a stuttered pop melody with piano and trumpet while lyrically presenting confidence in personality over physical appearance, embracing imperfections connected to the latter.

== Background ==
"Break My Face" was one of the final songs written for Neotheater, for which AJR wanted to create a track with a meaning less complex than others on the album, taking inspiration from the Red Hot Chili Peppers. The song's first draft took the title literally, discussing plastic surgery and the Kardashians. This was scrapped, and the band instead chose to parallel "100 Bad Days" from the same album, using a Friedrich Nietzsche aphorism for the message: It is off-quoted as "what doesn’t kill you makes you ugly". This was done to put the phrase through a more realistic and relatable lens, contrasting the mainstream usage of the original version. Neotheater was released on April 26, 2019, featuring "Break My Face" as the fifth track.

== Composition ==
"Break My Face" is a high-energy song, with Skyler Simpson of The Knight Crier describing its composure as a "catchy, feel-good vibe". The track primarily includes digital instrumentation in a hip hop style, using piano chords placed in stuttering intervals, programmed drums, and trumpets. The latter has artificial harmonies applied to it, created by an Auto-Tune effect inspired by Daft Punk's "Get Lucky". Throughout Neotheater, various elements and lyrics are reprised between other songs, acting as easter eggs to create an experience comparable to Broadway. In "Break My Face", a melodic sample of "Birthday Party" is included.

== Apptronic version ==
An alternate recording of "Break My Face" was released as a promotional single on August 15, 2019, exclusively streamable through Amazon Music. On the service, it is subtitled "(Amazon Original)", while its music video on YouTube is subtitled "(Apptronic Version)". The video, additionally released on August 15, shows AJR performing the song only using digital instruments from Amazon tablets.

== Personnel ==
Credits adapted from Tidal.

- Adam Met – instruments, composer
- Jack Met – lead vocals, instruments, composer
- Ryan Met – vocals, instruments, composer, producer, programming
- Chris Gehringer – mastering
- Joe Zook – mixing
- Drew Allsbrook – live engineering, bass
- JJ Kirkpatrick – trumpet
- Samia Finnerty – additional vocals
