= Bang! (AJR song) =

2020 single by AJR

Single by AJR

from the album OK Orchestra
- Released: February 12, 2020
- Recorded: 2019
- Genre: Indie pop; alternative dance; alternative pop
- Length: 2:51
- Label: AJR
- Songwriters: Jack Met; Adam Met; Ryan Met
- Producers: Ryan Met, Jack Met

AJR singles chronology
"Dear Winter 2.0" (2019)	"Bang!" (2020)	"Bummerland" (2020)

Audio sample
- file; help

Music video
- "BANG!" on YouTube

"Bang!" is a song by American pop band AJR. It was released on February 12, 2020, through their own label, AJR Productions. The song is the lead single from the band's fourth album, OK Orchestra. On August 8, 2020, a remix version was released featuring Hayley Kiyoko and AhhHaa.

The song received mixed reviews from critics. Some found the song underwhelming, lacking originality and with a repetitive beat, while others appreciated the catchy chorus and singalong quality, especially for fans of the band's existing style. Some critics noted the song's theme of struggling with adulthood, but felt it wasn't effectively conveyed through the lyrics and music video.

Despite this, "Bang!" was a commercial success, amassing over half a billion streams on Spotify and reaching the top 10 of the US Billboard Hot 100.

== Background ==
AJR released their third studio album Neotheater on April 26, 2019. That autumn, they embarked on an extensive North American tour in support of the album. Neotheater debuted to critical and commercial success, with album sales buoyed by the hit single "100 Bad Days". As a result, AJR announced the "Neotheater World Tour Part II" on November 15, 2019, with tour stops in North America, Europe, and South America, including festival appearances at Lollapalooza Argentina, Chile, and Brazil. The 2020 leg of the tour was postponed indefinitely due to the COVID-19 pandemic. AJR began working on "Bang!" in the process of writing Neotheater, and continued to work on the song throughout the subsequent tour. After struggling with how to make "Bang!" "sound current", the band sidelined the song to finish Neotheater, only returning to it after they finished touring.

AJR explained their motivation for writing the song: "We wrote 'BANG!' about the weird middle-ground between being a kid and becoming an adult; a time when we're doing all the things adults are supposed to do, but we don't yet feel grown up. The fact is, adulthood is bound to hit us at some point, so the plan we made in the song is to 'go out with a bang'. Sonically, with every new song we make, we try to stretch out of our AJR comfort zone. With 'BANG!,' it felt exciting to step into this darker, horn-heavy vibe, where the verses are small and mysterious, and the chorus explodes into this theatrical trap chorus".

The voice of the song that announces "Here we go!" and "Metronome!" is Charlie Pellett, best known for voicing the New York City Subway. When the song was first recorded, Ryan Met initially did the voice, but the group opted to get someone else to do. Their first choice was their father, Gary, and then a neighbor friend of his. AJR had used Pellett's voice for a live show years ago and he had emailed them; thanking them for the tribute. Realizing that they now had his email in their inbox, they asked him to help with the song and he happily obliged.

== Composition ==
"Bang!" is composed in 2/2 cut time and in the key of C-sharp minor, with a tempo of 70 beats per minute (bpm). Accents on the weaker beats of each measure give the song a bit of swagger, and make it reminiscent of a common reggae style. AJR's vocals on the song range from B_{2} at the low end to C♯_{5} at the high end.

== Music video ==
A music video for "Bang!" was uploaded on February 12, 2020, directed by Se Oh. The video features AJR hosting a dice game in a chandelier-lit parlor with the camera facing in one direction, only zooming in and out. The participants playing are seen going through various costume changes with every pan out, ranging from sailors to tuxedos to being nude.

== Chart performance ==
The song entered the US Billboard Hot 100 chart at number 99 and peaked at number 8 on the chart, becoming both the band's first top 40 entry and first top 10 entry, and their highest-charting single overall.

== Use in media ==
In November 2020, AJR performed the song at the Macy's Thanksgiving Day Parade on a Kalahari Resorts float. In the same month, Apple used an instrumental version of the chorus in "Bang!" in their holiday commercial. The performance and use in advertisement, coupled with a $0.69 cost on iTunes, pushed "Bang!" to number one on the US iTunes Sales Chart on December 26, dethroning Mariah Carey's "All I Want for Christmas Is You". "Bang!" was also used as the soundtrack of the opening montage at the 27th Screen Actors Guild Awards in 2021. In 2021, Will Smith performed a remix of "Bang!" with added vocals.

== Personnel ==
Credits adapted from Tidal.

- Adam Met – vocals, instruments, composer
- Jack Met – main vocals, instruments, composer
- Ryan Met – vocals, instruments, composer, producer
- Charlie Pellett – additional vocals
- JJ Kirkpatrick – trumpet
- Chris Gehringer – mastering engineer
- Joe Zook – mixing engineer

== Other versions ==
Title	Release date
Bang! – YouNotUs Remix	May 15, 2020
Bang! (featuring Hayley Kiyoko) – AhhHaa Remix	August 17, 2020
Bang! – Nathan Dawe Remix	October 9, 2020
Bang! – Acoustic	October 9, 2020

== Awards ==
At the 2021 Billboard Music Awards, "Bang!" took home the award for Top Rock Song, beating out "Monsters" by All Time Low, "Heat Waves" by Glass Animals, "My Ex's Best Friend" by Machine Gun Kelly, and "Level of Concern" by Twenty One Pilots. AJR also received nominations in the Top Duo/Group and Top Rock Artist categories, ultimately losing to BTS and Machine Gun Kelly, respectively.

Awards and nominations for "Bang!"
Year	Organization	Award	Result	Ref.
2021	Billboard Music Awards	Top Rock Song	Won	
2021	iHeartRadio Music Awards	Alternative Rock Song of the Year	Nominated	

== Charts ==
=== Weekly charts ===
Weekly chart performance for "Bang!"
Chart (2020–2021)	Peak position
Australia (ARIA)	37
Canada Hot 100 (Billboard)	20
Canada AC (Billboard)	31
Canada CHR/Top 40 (Billboard)	11
Canada Hot AC (Billboard)	9
Canada Rock (Billboard)	37
Global 200 (Billboard)	84
Israel (Media Forest)	7
New Zealand (Recorded Music NZ)	14
South Korea (Gaon)	106
US Billboard Hot 100	8
US Adult Contemporary (Billboard)	17
US Adult Pop Airplay (Billboard)	1
US Dance Airplay (Billboard)	22
US Pop Airplay (Billboard)	6
US Rock & Alternative Airplay (Billboard)	5
US Hot Rock & Alternative Songs (Billboard)	2
US Rolling Stone Top 100	15

=== Year-end charts ===
2020 year-end chart performance for "Bang!"
Chart (2020)	Position
US Adult Top 40 (Billboard)	21
US Mainstream Top 40 (Billboard)	50
US Rock Airplay (Billboard)	14
US Hot Rock & Alternative Songs (Billboard)	4

2021 year-end chart performance for "Bang!"
Chart (2021)	Position
Canada (Canadian Hot 100)	66
New Zealand (Recorded Music NZ)	38
US Billboard Hot 100	56
US Adult Contemporary (Billboard)	41
US Adult Top 40 (Billboard)	12
US Hot Rock & Alternative Songs (Billboard)	7
US Mainstream Top 40 (Billboard)	30

== Certifications ==
Certifications for "Bang!"
Region	Certification	Certified units/sales
Australia (ARIA)	2× Platinum	140,000^{‡}
Canada (Music Canada)	2× Platinum	160,000^{‡}
New Zealand (RMNZ)	3× Platinum	90,000^{‡}
United Kingdom (BPI)	Silver	200,000^{‡}
United States (RIAA)	4× Platinum	4,000,000^{‡}
^{‡} Sales+streaming figures based on certification alone.

== See also ==
- Billboard Year-End Hot 100 singles of 2021
- List of Billboard Adult Top 40 number-one songs of the 2020s
- List of Billboard Hot 100 top-ten singles in 2021
- Pop Airplay
