= OK Orchestra =

Studio album by AJR
- Released: March 26, 2021
- Recorded: 2019–2021
- Length: 45:48
- Labels: AJR; BMG
- Producer: Ryan Met

AJR chronology
| Neotheater (2019) | OK Orchestra (2021) | The Maybe Man (2023) |

Singles from OK Orchestra
- 1. "Bang!" Released: February 12, 2020; 2. "Bummerland" Released: August 31, 2020; 3. "My Play" Released: December 22, 2020; 4. "Way Less Sad" Released: February 17, 2021; 5. "World's Smallest Violin" Released: March 26, 2021

OK Orchestra (stylized in all uppercase), often abbreviated as OKO, is the fourth studio album by American pop band AJR. It was released on March 26, 2021, under BMG and the band's own label AJR Productions. The album was supported by five singles, "Bang!", "Bummerland", "My Play", "Way Less Sad", and "World's Smallest Violin". The album was produced by group member Ryan Met.

== Background ==
During a majority of the production of OK Orchestra, the album was titled Mad Orchestra, with AJR intending to make a "Bang!"-esque "dark and evil sounding" album. The band later decided on a more "melancholy, longing, and hopeful" sound, thinking of the negative mental repercussions that would come with writing a dark album. They replaced the album's "Mad" prefix with "OK" to represent the album's theme of "being worried about becoming irrelevant and obsolete" in the future but feeling OK in the current moment. In an interview alongside Rivers Cuomo, AJR confirmed that the title of OK Orchestra was not based on either Radiohead's OK Computer or Weezer's OK Human, the latter of which features the band on a remix of the track "All My Favorite Songs".

== Promotion and release ==
In February 2020, AJR released the album's first single, "Bang!", which became one of the trio's biggest hits ever in 2021 and in their entire time playing music. The single was originally intended as a track for a deluxe version of Neotheater, however this never came to fruition and the song eventually became the lead single for the forthcoming album.

On August 31, 2020, they released the album's second single, "Bummerland", a song about the band sarcastically expressing their feelings on the COVID-19 pandemic. On December 20, 2020, they announced that OK Orchestra would be the name of their upcoming album, while also releasing the third single from the album, "My Play". It was put up for pre-order on iTunes/Apple Music and showed that the album contained 13 tracks. AJR released the album's fourth single "Way Less Sad" and its music video on February 17, 2021, On March 21, 2021, AJR launched OKO World, an interactive experience playable on their official website.

AJR released a music video for "OK Overture" and "World's Smallest Violin" the same day the album was released. On June 23, almost three months later, they released a music video for "3 O'Clock Things". Two months afterwards on August 12, a music video for "Christmas in June" was released which featured footage filmed at the Wonderstruck Festival in Cleveland. On February 9, 2022, AJR released a music video for "Ordinaryish People".

== OK Orchestra Tour ==
On March 31, 2021, a tour for OK Orchestra was announced by AJR. A majority of 2022 tour dates in the US went public on April 11 and September 23, with an additional 12 dates in 2021 being published on July 27, 2021. The tour sold over 350 thousand tickets across 50 shows in the US.

A concert from the European Leg of the tour was supposed to happen on October 22, 2022, at the 1930 Moscow Concert Hall in Moscow, Russia. It was supposed to be the final concert of the tour. This concert was then cancelled due to the Russian invasion of Ukraine on February 25, 2022.

== Reception ==
OK Orchestra ratings
Review scores
| Source | Rating |
|---|---|
| AllMusic | 4/5 stars |
| Spectrum Culture | 1/5 stars |

A.D. Amorosi of Variety described the album as "harmonically vocalized, hyper-memoir-centricied, atmospheric mélange of pop, hip-hop, and doo-wop with quirky rhythms and a salting of smart-assed They Might Be Giants for tart taste". In a review for AllMusic, Matt Collar wrote that "OK Orchestra isn't just full of hit-worthy pop hooks, it's stage-worthy, ambitious, and full of insights driven by AJR's personal experience", rating the album 4/5. Thomas Stremfel of Spectrum Culture received the album less positively, rating the album a 25/100 and stating that "hearing the terrible production and cringe-inducing songwriting of OK Orchestra without warning makes for an undeniably engaging listen... Year-end album lists should be filing restraining orders against this album, but that doesn't mean you can't listen to it for a cheap laugh."

=== Accolades ===
The album was nominated for Top Rock Album at the 2022 Billboard Music Awards alongside other bands Twenty One Pilots, Coldplay, and Imagine Dragons.

== Commercial performance ==
OK Orchestra debuted at number 10 on the US Billboard 200 dated April 10, 2021, becoming AJR's second top-10 album. It earned 32,000 album-equivalent units, including 13,000 pure album sales. Although OK Orchestra placed at number 55 on the midweek UK Albums Chart dated March 29, 2021, it did not place in the final listing on April 2. Much of the album's popularity has been attributed to the singles "Bang!", "Way Less Sad", and "World's Smallest Violin".

== Track listing ==
All tracks are written by Adam Met, Jack Met, and Ryan Met, except where noted.

OK Orchestra track listing
| No. | Title | Writer(s) | Length |
|---|---|---|---|
| 1. | "OK Overture" | | 4:31 |
| 2. | "Bummerland" | | 3:09 |
| 3. | "3 O'Clock Things" | | 3:47 |
| 4. | "My Play" | | 3:10 |
| 5. | "Joe" | | 3:33 |
| 6. | "Adventure Is Out There" | | 3:32 |
| 7. | "Bang!" | | 2:51 |
| 8. | "The Trick" | | 2:51 |
| 9. | "Ordinaryish People" (featuring Blue Man Group) | A. Met; J. Met; R. Met; Jeff Quay | 3:40 |
| 10. | "Humpty Dumpty" | | 3:38 |
| 11. | "World's Smallest Violin" | | 3:01 |
| 12. | "Way Less Sad" | A. Met; J. Met; R. Met; Paul Simon | 3:28 |
| 13. | "Christmas in June" | | 4:40 |
| Total length: | | | 45:49 |

== Personnel ==
Credits adapted from Tidal.

AJR

- Adam Met – bass guitar, instruments, vocals
- Jack Met – lead vocals, instruments
- Ryan Met – lead vocals, vocals, production (all tracks), instruments (2, 7), programming (2, 4, 12)

Additional personnel

- Chris Gehringer – mastering
- Joe Zook – mixing
- Alba Avoricani – additional vocals (1, 3–6, 8–13)
- Ruth Kornblatt-Stier – cello (1, 3, 5, 6, 8, 10)
- Danny Ferenbach – violin (1, 3–6, 8–13), trumpet (12)
- Emelia Suljic – violin (1, 3, 5, 6, 8, 10)
- Andrew Sobelsohn – slide guitar (1, 6)
- Barbara D Dirickson – narrator (1)
- Chris Berry – drums (3, 6, 13)
- Josh Plotner – flute (3), clarinet (13)
- Arnetta Johnson – trumpet (3, 9, 13)
- The Beu Sisters – vocals (3)
- Bas Janssen – trumpet engineer (3)
- Kenny Urban – beatbox (5)
- Charlie Pellett – additional vocals (7)
- JJ Kirkpatrick – trumpet (7)
- Blue Man Group – ensemble (9)
- Jeff Quay – percussion (9)
- Mike Jones – sousaphone (9)
- Kamila Stankiewicz – artwork
- Chris Cerrato – design
- Jader Souza – design

== Charts ==
=== Weekly charts ===
Weekly chart performance for OK Orchestra
| Chart (2021) | Peak position |
|---|---|
| Canadian Albums (Billboard) | 27 |
| US Billboard 200 | 10 |
| US Independent Albums (Billboard) | 3 |
| US Top Album Sales (Billboard) | 4 |
| US Top Alternative Albums (Billboard) | 1 |
| US Top Rock Albums (Billboard) | 1 |
| US Vinyl Albums (Billboard) | 16 |

=== Year-end charts ===
Year-end chart performance for OK Orchestra
| Chart (2021) | Position |
|---|---|
| US Billboard 200 | 199 |
| US Independent Albums (Billboard) | 34 |
| US Top Alternative Albums (Billboard) | 19 |
| US Top Rock Albums (Billboard) | 37 |

== Certifications ==
Certifications for OK Orchestra
| Region | Certification | Certified units/sales |
|---|---|---|
| New Zealand (RMNZ) | Gold | 7,500^{‡} |
| United States (RIAA) | Gold | 500,000^{‡} |
^{‡} Sales+streaming figures based on certification alone.

== See also ==
- List of 2021 albums (January–June)
