= Bummerland =

2020 single by AJR

Single by AJR

from the album OK Orchestra
- Released: August 31, 2020
- Recorded: 2019–2020
- Genre: Pop, electropop
- Length: 3:09
- Label: S-Curve
- Songwriters: Jack Met; Adam Met; Ryan Met
- Producer: Ryan Met

AJR singles chronology
"Bang!" (2020)	"Bummerland" (2020)	"My Play" (2020)

Music video
- "Bummerland" on YouTube

"Bummerland" is a song by American pop band AJR. It was released on August 31, 2020 via S-Curve Records as the second single from the band's fourth studio album OK Orchestra.

== Background ==
During the Neotheater World Tour, the band began writing the song's instrumental, teasing it as a "confidential new AJR song" in episode 4 of their autobiographical documentary series Neotheater World Tour Doc. In an interview on Zach Sang Show, Jack Met mentions that the song had six different choruses written for it over the instrumental's lifetime, but were unable to find one that fit. The last chorus revision, written during the COVID-19 pandemic, was titled "Outside". AJR member Adam Met states that it was the only song on OK Orchestra that he did not like, with the meaning of the lyrics being mistakenly confused for socialized medicine.

AJR planned on releasing "World's Smallest Violin" as a single in June 2020, but opted not to out of respect to the Black Lives Matter movement. During this month, the lyrics of "Bummerland" instantaneously came to Jack while the band was at Long Island, saying in an interview "once we actually started writing 'Bummerland' we were done in probably 20 minutes". Shortly after writing was finished the band immediately began recording the music video, with Ryan Met stating "as we were writing this one, we had this big feeling that it needed to come out right now" on his Instagram. The song was teased on social media on August 23 and officially released on August 31, 2020.

== Composition and lyrics ==
The lyrics to "Bummerland" describe hitting rock bottom with the optimistic mindset of "the only way to go is up", while also including quarantine anecdotes. The bridge of the song features "instrumoprhing", a transition from one instrument into another produced in a way to make it morph rather than cut, with "Bummerland" using a voice, trumpet, guitar, and violin. This is also used in the song "World's Smallest Violin" from the same album.

== Music video ==
The official video directed by Edoardo Ranaboldo was released on August 31, 2020. The video begins with lead singer Jack Met sitting atop the Shorecrest Bed and Breakfast and later cuts to various shots of AJR performing the song in matching costumes. 1/7 of the video features the song's drum performance, playing a taiko at Browder's Birds and a floor tom in the ocean. The band additionally performs in a pink flamingo floaty on top of a car (later adapted into the single's cover artwork), a rusty truck, the ocean, a boat, and bikes at several locations in Suffolk County, New York, primarily Browder's Birds livestock farm and Lavender By the Bay lavender farm. The video has grossed over 16 million views as of September 2023.

== Live performances ==
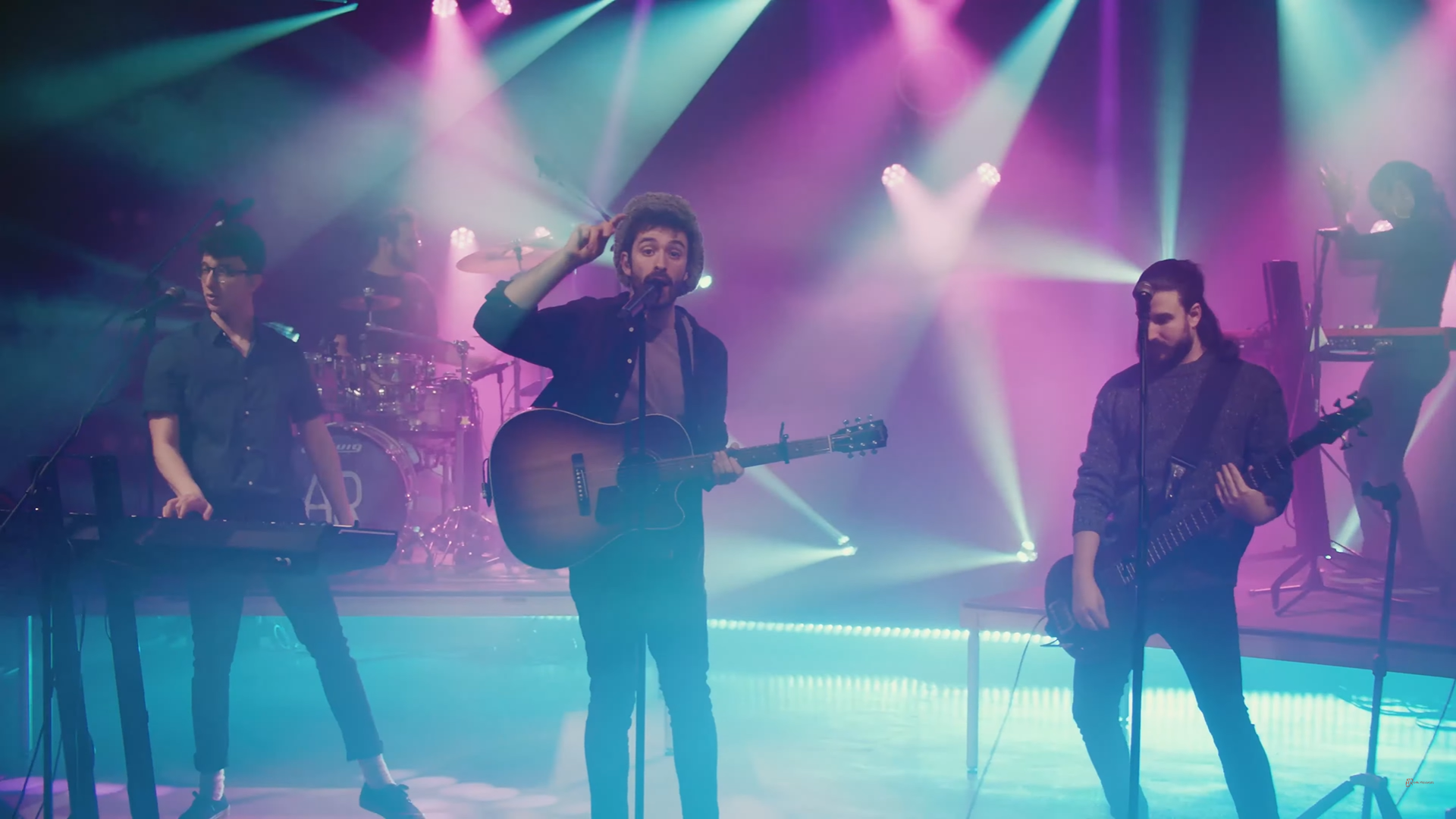
AJR performing "Bummerland" for the "We The People" virtual concert

Due to the COVID-19 pandemic, "Bummerland" was unable to be performed live traditionally within its release year, but the band experimented with other methods. The song made its live debut at Live Nation's drive-in concert series, being performed on August 19 and August 20, 2020, two weeks before the single's release. Later in the year, AJR partnered with UScellular to livestream an acoustic concert on December 18, 2020, featuring the first acoustic performance of "Bummerland". On December 26, 2020, AJR hosted virtual concert AJR's One Spectacular Night, which saw the fourth and final 2020 performance of the song.

In 2021, AJR performed "Bummerland" during the "We The People" virtual concert for president Joe Biden's inauguration. Upon OK Orchestra's release date on March 26, 2021, the band livestreamed an acoustic concert featuring "Bummerland" and five other songs from the album. AJR performed at virtual concert festival SUNYFest as an opening act for Kesha on April 24, 2021, including the song in their setlist. On May 25, 2021, they performed a private concert at DTS Sound Space, marking the eighth and final performance of "Bummerland" before a return to the band performing standard concerts on July 2, 2021.

== Other uses ==
The song, along with "Way Less Sad", was used in American baseball promotions for ESPN as their official anthem for the 2021 Major League Baseball season.

== Personnel ==
Credits adapted from the album's liner notes.

- Adam Met – vocals, instruments, composer
- Jack Met – main vocals, instruments, composer
- Ryan Met – vocals, instruments, composer, producer
- Chris Gehringer – mastering engineer
- Joe Zook – mixing engineer

== Charts ==
Weekly chart performance for "Bummerland"
Chart (2020–2021)	Peak position
US Hot Rock & Alternative Songs (Billboard)	32
US Rock & Alternative Airplay (Billboard)	42
