= Way Less Sad =

2021 single by AJR

- Cover artwork for the Cash Cash remix of "Way Less Sad"

Single by AJR

from the album OK Orchestra
- Released: February 17, 2021
- Recorded: 2012, 2019–2020
- Genre: Pop; hip hop
- Length: 3:26
- Label: AJR Productions; BMG; S-Curve; Black Butter
- Songwriters: Adam Met; Jack Met; Ryan Met; Paul Simon
- Producer: Ryan Met

AJR singles chronology
"My Play" (2020)	"Way Less Sad" (2021)	"World's Smallest Violin" (2021)

Music video
- "Way Less Sad" on YouTube

"Way Less Sad" is a song by American pop band AJR. It was released on February 17, 2021, via the band's label AJR Productions and BMG. It was additionally released through S-Curve Records for radio airplay and through Black Butter Records for international releases. The song was the fourth single for the band's fourth studio album OK Orchestra, appearing as the twelfth track. It samples the song "My Little Town" by American folk rock duo Simon & Garfunkel and builds off unused demos intended for Norwegian DJ Kygo and American rapper Cardi B.

The song's lyrics discuss having optimism amidst a poor state of mental health, instrumentally backed by upbeat pop music with hip hop influence. A music video for "Way Less Sad" was released alongside the song, featuring the band performing in various New York City locations. The single was a commercial success, with numerous radio adds helping it chart in three countries and amass hundreds of millions of streams on Spotify. It was used by ESPN as an anthem for the 2021 MLB season and would later be remixed by Cash Cash.

== Promotion ==
AJR released "Bang!", "Bummerland", and "My Play" as singles throughout 2020, opening pre-orders for their fourth studio album, OK Orchestra, alongside the latter on December 22, 2020. A fourth single was later teased on Twitter, previewing the song's pre-chorus and music video on January 28 and February 7 before the release of "Way Less Sad" on February 17, 2021. After the release of the song, AJR gave a press release with ABC News Radio, stating that "so much of last year felt apocalyptic and this year we can finally see the light at the end of the tunnel. Things aren't back to normal yet, but we should be celebrating the small wins, even if they seem trivial".

== Background and composition ==
In 2012, AJR created an upbeat disco song, sampling the final trumpet riff of Simon & Garfunkel's "My Little Town" as its primary hook. In 2019, Kygo reached out to the band with a finished instrumental and asked for lyrical writing. They created the chorus of "don't you love it? No, I ain't happy yet, but I'm way less sad", but this was rejected. In 2020, Atlantic Records asked AJR if they could produce material for Cardi B. The band reworked their previous disco song into a hip-hop song titled "Winning", but this demo was denied by Cardi B in favor of "WAP". Atlantic offered the song to another rapper, but AJR withdrew the song for themselves. The band began writing a song around the previously written chorus for Kygo, combining it with "Winning" as the song's instrumental to create "Way Less Sad".

"Way Less Sad"
A 28-second sample of "Way Less Sad" by AJR, where the first chorus is heard.

"Way Less Sad" begins with a rhythmic left-hand piano riff that appears in the majority of the song. The chorus enters with a brass sample of "My Little Town", 808 bass, drums, and vocalization from lead singer Jack Met. The instrumentation tones down at the beginning of each verse, lyrically describing failed attempts at happiness and the lowering of standards to accept this. The song's first chorus begins with only xylophone and vocals before transitioning back into the song's opening chorus, with later choruses directly beginning with the sample rather than xylophone. The lyrics during this portion notice improvement in mental health and find new happiness through previously unappreciated aspects of life. The band described the song's general tone as an "ironic party song" while making the song's lyrics time-specific, directly mentioning Twitter to reference the political situation of the United States during the COVID-19 pandemic.

=== Production ===
AJR produced the song in the living room of their apartment in New York. During shows performed for The Maybe Man Tour in 2024, band member Ryan Met showcased the song's layers in a How We Made segment. The band used a slowed-down kick, sped-up hi-hat, and flammed plate clattering as a clap to create a half-time trap beat. Piano and violin were added to the song to create emotion, with extra hi-hats and bass appearing as well. The band adapted the trumpet melody for the song's verses from Ryan telling Jack "would you put your phone down" in response to watching old home movies. These movies would later be used to create the chorus lyrics that are used in the band's demo for Kygo, which were repurposed for "Way Less Sad" due to the band failing to create a vocal melody for it.

== Music video ==
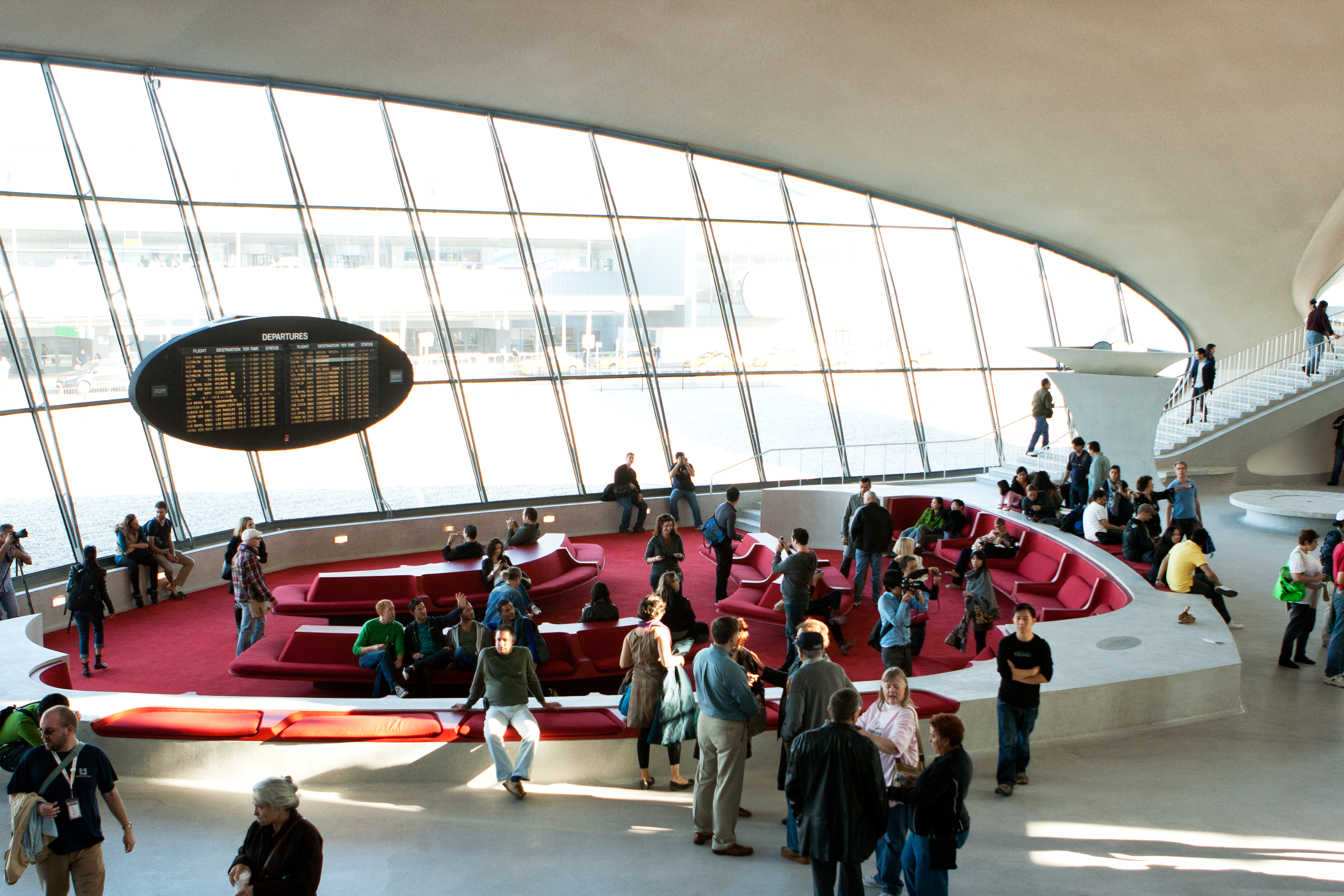
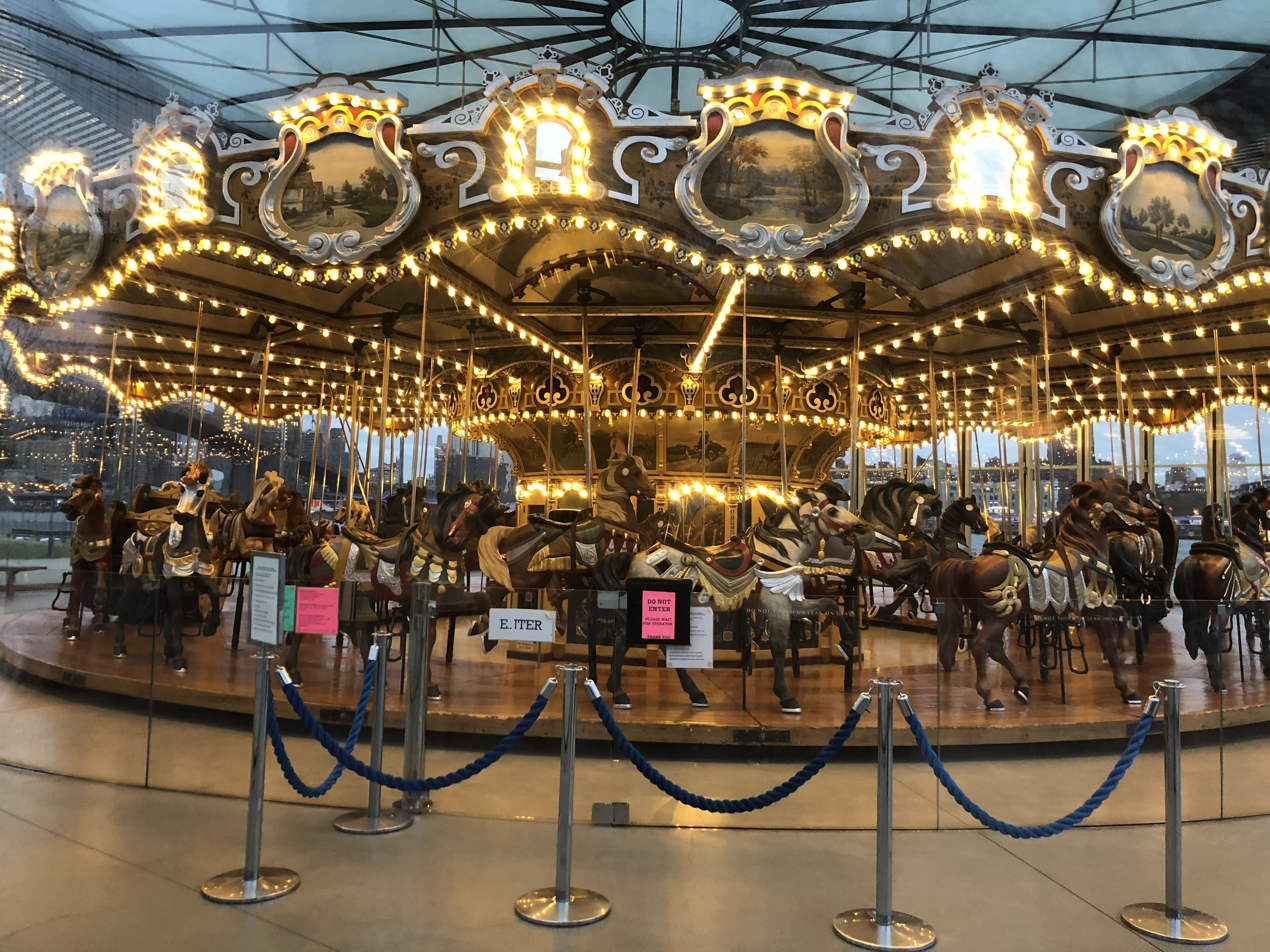
Filming locations for "Way Less Sad", including TWA Flight Center and Jane's Carousel

A music video for "Way Less Sad" was directed by Edoardo Ranaboldo and released on February 17, 2021, premiering on YouTube at 10 am EST. The video cuts between several locations in New York City, with the band pushing Jack on a luggage cart at the TWA terminal at the John F. Kennedy International Airport, performing the song in front of and on Jane's Carousel in Brooklyn, standing on a beach at Coney Island, hanging Jack upside down at a table, and performing in a bedroom.

On YouTube, "Way Less Sad" grossed 606,748 views on its opening day. The video was filmed during a week in January 2021. Visual effects were applied to various parts of the video, simulating the band singing underwater and editing multiple versions of Jack on an escalator into the same shot. Computer-generated imagery was additionally used by Caleb Natale to create a ground shot of Ryan walking on the carousel.

== Commercial performance ==
For the week of February 23, 2021, "Way Less Sad" became the most added song on alternative radio in the United States, receiving over 50 adds. In March, along with "Bummerland", the song was used in American baseball promotions for ESPN as their official anthem for the 2021 Major League Baseball season. On April 1, 2021, "Way Less Sad" was featured on Jimmy Kimmel Live!, with the band performing in the woods rather than the studio's stage. Later in the month, the song reached 25 million streams on Spotify after being added to over 200 radio stations.

"Way Less Sad" charted in Canada, New Zealand, and the US, spending 15 weeks on the Billboard Hot 100 after debuting on the chart on May 8, 2021. It would peak on July 17 at number 54, alongside reaching 85 million Spotify streams. It was additionally performed alongside "Bang!" at the 2021 Billboard Music Awards on May 23, where the latter won the award for Top Rock Song. "Way Less Sad" had amassed over 100 million streams in total by June 2022, earning a Platinum certification in the US on December 9.

== Cash Cash remix ==
A remix of "Way Less Sad" by American electronic music group Cash Cash was released on June 29, 2021. The remix adds dance components to the song.

== Track listings ==
Digital download / streaming single

1. "Way Less Sad" – 3:26

Digital download / streaming single

1. "Way Less Sad (Cash Cash Remix)" – 2:44
2. "Way Less Sad" – 3:26

== Personnel ==
Credits adapted from Tidal.

- Adam Met – instruments, composer
- Jack Met – lead vocals, instruments, composer
- Ryan Met – vocals, instruments, composer, producer, programming
- Paul Simon – composer
- Chris Gehringer – mastering (Note: "Way Less Sad" only)
- Joe Zook – mixing
- Alba Avoricani – additional vocals
- Danny Ferenbach – violin, trumpet
- Cash Cash – remixer (Note: "Way Less Sad (Cash Cash Remix)" only)

== Charts ==
=== Weekly charts ===
Weekly chart performance for "Way Less Sad"
Chart (2021–2022)	Peak position
Canada CHR/Top 40 (Billboard)	45
Canada Hot AC (Billboard)	32
Canada Rock (Billboard)	41
New Zealand Hot Singles (RMNZ)	33
US Adult Contemporary (Billboard)	23
US Adult Pop Airplay (Billboard)	10
US Alternative Airplay (Billboard)	2
US Billboard Hot 100	54
US Hot Rock & Alternative Songs (Billboard)	5
US Pop Airplay (Billboard)	21
US Rock & Alternative Airplay (Billboard)	4

=== Year-end charts ===
Year-end chart performance for "Way Less Sad"
Chart (2021)	Position
US Adult Top 40 (Billboard)	29
US Hot Rock & Alternative Songs (Billboard)	14
US Rock Airplay (Billboard)	12

== Certifications ==
Certifications for "Way Less Sad"
Region	Certification	Certified units/sales
United States (RIAA)	Platinum	1,000,000^{‡}
^{‡} Sales+streaming figures based on certification alone.

== Release history ==
Release dates and formats for "Way Less Sad"
Region	Date	Format(s)	Label	Ref.
United States	February 17, 2021	Digital download; streaming	BMG	
Various	February 17, 2021	Digital download; streaming	Black Butter	
United States	March 9, 2021	Contemporary hit radio	S-Curve	
