= My Play =

2020 single by AJR

Single by AJR

from the album OK Orchestra
- Released: December 22, 2020
- Recorded: 2020
- Genre: Pop, electropop
- Length: 3:10
- Label: S-Curve
- Songwriters: Jack Met; Adam Met; Ryan Met
- Producer: Ryan Met

AJR singles chronology
"Bummerland" (2020)	"My Play" (2020)	"Way Less Sad" (2021)

Music video
- "My Play" on YouTube

"My Play" is a song by American pop band AJR. It was released on December 22, 2020 via S-Curve Records as the third single from the band's fourth studio album OK Orchestra.

== Background ==
Adam, Jack, and Ryan Metzger share parents who divorced during their childhood. Jack told ABC Audio that "many other artists have written about divorces, people can be desensitized about the topic". After coming up with the idea of a child performing a play twice to divorced parents, they felt they had a "fresh angle". In an interview on Zach Sang Show, Jack explains this as "putting on a play for your parents which is the most exciting thing in the world when you're five years old... and the feeling of showing both of your parents is the best thing in the world, and now that is gone, it's taken away from you, and that is such a devastating thing".

"My Play" was initially planned to have an electric guitar for the main melody, but while writing the song Ryan used a MIDI "wonky clean guitar" that was later favored for its connection to the song. The song was teased on social media on December 14 and officially released on December 22, 2020.

== Composition ==
"My Play" is composed in 4/4 time signature in the key of F major and follows a tempo of 79 beats per minute (bpm).

The instrumental composition heavily layers detuned sped-up female vocals, an 808 MPC/drum kit hybrid, several guitars, and violins to create a "big, cluttered, panicky headache".

== Music video ==
The official video, released on December 27, 2020, was directed by Jason Merrin, animated by Venturia Animation Studios, and produced by Rachel Liu. The video "acts out imaginative scenes of childhood, featuring adventures on dinosaurs, in outer space, under the sea and more before a moving box-filled depiction of divorce triggers confusion and anger". The video has amassed over 4 million views as of September 2023.

== Live performances ==
"My Play" made its live debut during virtual concert AJR's One Spectacular Night on December 26, 2020. During the band's OK Orchestra Tour, the song had a limited appearance in only the 12 shows during the 2021 leg, and has not been played since.

== Personnel ==
Credits adapted from the album's liner notes.

- Adam Met – vocals, instruments, composer
- Jack Met – main vocals, instruments, composer
- Ryan Met – vocals, instruments, composer, producer
- Danny Ferenbach – violin
- Chris Gehringer – mastering engineer
- Joe Zook – mixing engineer

== Charts ==
Weekly chart performance for "My Play"
Chart (2021)	Peak position
New Zealand Hot Singles (RMNZ)	40
