= Next Up Forever =

2019 song by AJR

Song by AJR

from the album Neotheater
- Released: April 26, 2019
- Recorded: 2018–2019
- Genre: Electropop
- Length: 4:16
- Label: AJR Productions; BMG
- Songwriter(s): Jack Met; Ryan Met
- Producer(s): Ryan Met

Audio
- "Next Up Forever" on YouTube

"Next Up Forever" is a song by American pop band AJR, appearing as the opening track on their third studio album Neotheater.

== Background ==
After the success of the band's second studio album, The Click (2017), AJR began stressing if their career had peaked. The band took inspiration from this fear and put into their writing, preferring the feeling of anticipating something rather than having it. AJR included "Next Up Forever" as the opening track of Neotheater, contrasting from their albums Living Room, The Click, and OK Orchestra with each containing an overture as the album's first song.

== Composition and production ==
A screenshot from a recording session led by Bruce Healey.

The song is composed in 4/4 time signature in the key of B-flat major and follows a tempo of 90 beats per minute (bpm). After the success The Click, AJR had a higher budget than their first two studio albums, so the band decided to spend more on their production. A live orchestra was in the studio, re-performing a synthesizer demo into saxophone, flute, and string instruments. AJR additionally hired Bruce Healey, a previous arranger for the Mellomen's music, to arrange the choir on "Next Up Forever". Healey used recording equipment such as a Pacific Bell telephone from the 1940s to create an authentic close harmony choir sound rather than using plug-ins to emulate the sound. The song's drums take inspiration from "Pretty Girl Rock" by Keri Hilson.

== Personnel ==
Credits adapted from Tidal.

- Adam Met – bass, backing vocals, composer
- Jack Met – lead vocals, instruments, composer
- Ryan Met – instruments, backing vocals, composer, producer, programming
- Chris Gehringer – mastering engineer
- Drew Allsbrook – audio mixing
- Joe Zook – mixing engineer
- Ruth Kornblatt-Stier – cello
- Emelia Suljic – violin
- Bruce Healey – choir arranger

== Charts ==
Weekly chart performance for "Next Up Forever"
Chart (2019)	Peak position
US Hot Rock & Alternative Songs (Billboard)	38
