= Dear Winter =

2019 single by AJR

Single by AJR

from the album Neotheater
- Released: April 5, 2019
- Recorded: 2018
- Genre: Pop
- Length: 2:48
- Label: S-Curve
- Songwriter: Ryan Met
- Producer: Ryan Met

AJR singles chronology
"Birthday Party" (2019)	"Dear Winter" (2019)	"Break My Face" (2019)

Music video
- "Dear Winter" on YouTube

"Dear Winter" is a song by American pop band AJR. It was released on April 5, 2019 via S-Curve Records as the third single from the band's third studio album Neotheater.

== Background ==
Jack and Ryan Met attended Columbia University while writing and producing Neotheater. After the release of "Dear Winter", AJR put out a statement that "the song was a letter to [Ryan's] future child about the awkwardness of dating". Ryan Met explains in an interview with iHeartRadio he wrote "Dear Winter" "after I asked a girl to hang out and she said no. And it wasn't quite a song about her, it was more of a song to my future kid about how strange and difficult it was to find their mom, and how weird it is to date in 2019".

Ryan Met wrote the song in the living room of his and Jack's apartment in New York. When interviewed by Zach Sang on Zach Sang Show on the topic of him writing "Turning Out Pt. II" and "Dear Winter", Ryan says "I think my emotion, if it's used for something, to help someone else, or just to be out there, is a lot more valid than if it just disappears forever". Ryan also states that the song is his favorite on the album from a songwriting standpoint, while Jack states it's his favorite song Ryan wrote.

== Composition ==
"Dear Winter" is composed in 4/4 common time and in the key of F major, with a tempo of 94 beats per minute (bpm).

== Music video ==
The official music video was released on April 5, 2019. Jack Met appears alone on a boat in a lake and performs the song on acoustic guitar. As of August 2023, the music video on YouTube has received over 13 million views.

== Personnel ==
Credits adapted from Tidal.

- Adam Met – backing vocals, composer
- Jack Met – main vocals, composer
- Ryan Met – backing vocals, instruments, composer, producer
- Chris Gehringer – mastering engineer
- Joe Zook – audio mixing

== Charts ==
Weekly chart performance for "Dear Winter"
Chart (2019)	Peak position
US Adult Pop Airplay (Billboard)	30
US Hot Rock & Alternative Songs (Billboard)	21
US Rock & Alternative Airplay (Billboard)	39

== 2.0 version ==
"Dear Winter 2.0"

Single by AJR

from the album Neotheater
- Released: October 25, 2019
- Recorded: 2019
- Genre: Pop
- Length: 2:50
- Label: S-Curve
- Songwriter: Ryan Met
- Producers: Ryan Met; Michael Mangini

AJR singles chronology
"Break My Face" (2019)	"Dear Winter 2.0" (2019)	"Bang!" (2020)

On October 24, 2019, AJR announced on Twitter that a version of "Dear Winter" with different production would be released the next day. The version received additional production from Michael Mangini with vocal effects and added instruments such as drums, strings, and synths. The single released October 25, 2019. "Dear Winter 2.0" along with "Bang!" were intended for a deluxe edition of Neotheater, but was ultimately canceled due to the COVID-19 pandemic.

=== Composition ===
"Dear Winter 2.0" is composed in 4/4 common time and in the key of F major, with a tempo of 94 beats per minute (bpm).

=== Personnel ===
Credits adapted from Tidal.

- Adam Met – backing vocals, instruments, composer
- Jack Met – main vocals, instruments, composer
- Ryan Met – backing vocals, instruments, composer, producer
- Michael Mangini – drums, producer, mastering engineer, programming
- Chris Gehringer – mastering engineer
- Joe Zook – audio mixing
- Dillon Kondor – electric guitar
- Emily Brausa – strings
- Yasmin De Soiza – strings
