= World's Smallest Violin =

Single by AJR

from the album OK Orchestra
- Released: March 26, 2021
- Recorded: 2020
- Length: 3:01
- Label: AJR; BMG
- Songwriters: Adam Met; Jack Met; Ryan Met
- Producers: Ryan Met, Jack Met

AJR singles chronology
"Way Less Sad" (2021)	"World's Smallest Violin" (2021)	"All My Favorite Songs" (2021)

Audio
- "World's Smallest Violin" on YouTube

Music video
- "World's Smallest Violin" on YouTube

"World's Smallest Violin" is a song recorded by the American pop band AJR. It was released on March 26, 2021, as the 11th track from the band's fourth studio album OK Orchestra and as a music video. In the first half of 2022, the song became a viral song on the social media platform TikTok, with many using the ending verse and the line "I'll blow up into smithereens" as a soundbite on the site as backing audio for fan edits or to look back on past successes.

== Background and composition ==
"World's Smallest Violin" was initially planned as the album's second single with a release date in June 2020, but was later switched with "Bummerland" as the band felt the latter worked better as "the anthem of [the] summer". The song speaks about trying to minimize one's pain and comparing one's pain to another's, for example, seeing a therapist and having a grandfather that fought in World War II and a great-grandfather who was a fireman. The music features transitions between a violin, a trumpet, and a piano. The song is described as, according to The Daily Californian:

[a strong example] of the three brothers' fearless leap into a multitude of musical genres, daring to explore folk, jazz and musical theatre all within a single track. This ambitious bridging of styles could lead to disaster, but the brothers of AJR have mastered the skill, mirroring not only the sound, but also the lyrical content of each genre: In "World's Smallest Violin", for example, they imitate country classics by telling a generational story. In terms of Broadway influences, many tracks are narrative-driven, and listeners have long noticed melodic similarities to that of theatrical soundtracks. In conjunction with songs that often speak to very foundational human emotions and fragilities, this may be what is most compelling about AJR's music, and what allows the band's songs to resonate with audiences both young and old.

In a TikTok made by the band themselves, production for the song included creating a beat with clapping and stomping their feet. To make background vocals, a vocoder was used. The band also wanted to try to flawlessly seam a transition from a violin to vocals to a guitar, with a theatrical ending to the song where "everything comes at once", with a continuously speeding up verse.

== Critical reception ==
Initial reception for "World's Smallest Violin" was favorable to mixed. Music critic for Variety, A. D. Amorosi wrote that the song did not fit in well with the album's message of an emotionally deep and thought-provoking; however, Amorosi wrote that the song, removed from the album, would work well. Zachary Wittman, writer for The Globe, wrote a negative review on the OK Orchestra album itself; however, he found "World's Smallest Violin" to be "passable", saying "[it] is the second passable song on here with a nice melody and a really fun lyrical concept. Again though, they ruin it with some horrid turns of phrases. I understand the metaphor of the world's smallest violin needing to be played is the equivalent of needing to vent to someone about your mental health, but they did not need to say 'spew my tiny symphony.'" The rapidly-escalating climax quickly became popular material for content creators online, with one particularly common method of utilizing it involving splicing together clips of their past work to the song's beat in a montage format as a way of showcasing their creative evolution.

== Music video ==
On the same day as its release, a music video directed by Edoardo Ranaboldo was released for "World's Smallest Violin". In the video, AJR performs the song in an apartment while strange things happen around them, such as things breaking, instruments floating, and a tornado blowing papers around the room. The video ends with the room and members Adam and Ryan suddenly freezing, as member Jack looks around in confusion.

The music video had a spike in views after the song went viral; it is currently the most viewed video on AJR's YouTube channel, with 278 million views as of June 2026.

== Personnel ==
Credits adapted from Tidal.

- Adam Met – backing vocals, instruments, composer
- Jack Met – lead vocals, instruments, composer
- Ryan Met – backing vocals, instruments, composer, producer
- Chris Gehringer – mastering engineer
- Joe Zook – audio mixing
- Alba Avoricani – additional vocals
- Danny Ferenbach – violin

== Charts ==
=== Weekly charts ===
Weekly chart performance for "World's Smallest Violin"
Chart (2021–2023)	Peak position
Global 200 (Billboard)	189
Ireland (IRMA)	79
Japan Hot Overseas (Billboard Japan)	4
South Korea (Circle)	171
UK Singles (Official Charts)	75
US Billboard Hot 100	91
US Adult Pop Airplay (Billboard)	34
US Hot Rock & Alternative Songs (Billboard)	10
US Pop Airplay (Billboard)	19

=== Year-end charts ===
Year-end chart performance for "World's Smallest Violin"
Chart (2022)	Position
US Hot Rock & Alternative Songs (Billboard)	20

Chart (2023)	Position
US Hot Rock & Alternative Songs (Billboard)	66

== Certifications ==
Certifications for "World's Smallest Violin"
Region	Certification	Certified units/sales
Australia (ARIA)	Platinum	70,000^{‡}
New Zealand (RMNZ)	Gold	15,000^{‡}
Poland (ZPAV)	Platinum	50,000^{‡}
United Kingdom (BPI)	Silver	200,000^{‡}
United States (RIAA)	Platinum	1,000,000^{‡}
^{‡} Sales+streaming figures based on certification alone.
