= Karma (AJR song) =

2019 song by AJR

Song by AJR

from the album Neotheater
- Released: April 26, 2019
- Recorded: 2018
- Genre: Electropop
- Length: 4:05
- Label: AJR Productions; BMG
- Songwriter(s): Jack Met; Ryan Met
- Producer(s): Ryan Met

Audio
- "Karma" on YouTube

"Karma" is a song by American pop band AJR, appearing as the eighth track on their third studio album Neotheater. It is the second-most popular song from the album, amassing over 106 million streams as of September 2025.

== Background ==
"Karma" was the first song made for Neotheater, with Jack Met leading the song's writing. Following The Click (2017), Jack was frustrated that he didn't feel happiness after the band's newfound success, writing the song's chorus in early 2018. "Karma" was written from the perspective of a patient in a therapist's office, expressing an "unearned lack of good fortune" The song's outro is lyrically filled with Jack going back and forth on his own thoughts and seeking affirmation from the therapist. The song reached 10 million views on YouTube in July 2022.

== Composition and production ==
The song is composed in 4/4 time signature in the key of F-sharp major and follows a tempo of 156 beats per minute (bpm). "Karma" instrumentally escalates as it progresses, building each verse with orchestral backings, choirs, and cowbell. The final section drops out most instrumentation in favor of Jack's crescendoing voice. This section uses several vocal takes recorded in Portland (Note: The band has not specified which Portland recording took place in.) to artificially remove breathing noises, mimicking an emotional outburst. "Karma" additionally shares vocal and instrumental melodies with songs from the same album; "100 Bad Days" and "Turning Out Pt. II", respectively.

== Personnel ==
Credits adapted from Tidal.

- Adam Met – bass, backing vocals, composer
- Jack Met – lead vocals, instruments, composer
- Ryan Met – instruments, backing vocals, composer, producer, programming
- Chris Gehringer – mastering engineer
- Joe Zook – mixing engineer
- Ruth Kornblatt-Stier – cello
- Alba Avoricani – backing vocals

== Charts ==
Weekly chart performance for "Karma"
Chart (2019)	Peak position
US Hot Rock & Alternative Songs (Billboard)	36

== Certifications ==
Certifications for "Karma"
Region	Certification	Certified units/sales
United States (RIAA)	Gold	500,000^{‡}
^{‡} Sales+streaming figures based on certification alone.
