= Birthday Party (song) =

2019 single by AJR

Single by AJR

from the album Neotheater
- Released: March 12, 2019
- Recorded: 2018
- Genre: Pop
- Length: 3:43
- Label: S-Curve
- Songwriters: Jack Met; Adam Met; Ryan Met; Peter Ivers; David Lynch
- Producer: Ryan Met

AJR singles chronology
"100 Bad Days" (2019)	"Birthday Party" (2019)	"Dear Winter" (2019)

Audio
- "Birthday Party" on YouTube

"Birthday Party" is a song by American pop band AJR. It was released as the albums second single via S-Curve Records on March 12, 2019, for the band's third studio album Neotheater.

== Background ==
Following the release of lead single "100 Bad Days", AJR announced the album's name and cover art on March 10, 2019. The album's tracklist was revealed in conjunction with the single release of "Birthday Party" on March 12, 2019.

A sample of the song "In Heaven", written by Peter Ivers and David Lynch and performed by Laurel Near in the 1977 film Eraserhead, is featured in the bridge of the song. On the show BUILD Series, Jack Met tells that "Ryan and I are at Columbia and we're studying film, and in one of our classes we saw this movie called Eraserhead [...] and then we saw this one part where this guy goes in a radiator, and then this woman starts singing to him, and as soon as she starts singing this song we looked at each other, we stopped laughing, and we were like 'Oh my god, we have to use this on the album'".

In an interview on Zach Sang Show, Ryan Met explains the idea for "Birthday Party" came from "a neighbor who just had a baby, we were giving the baby bath, we were talking, and it was at the time the Brett Kavanaugh stuff was happening. The baby's mom, Sarah, was like 'Oh you don't know about any of this, the world is great to you'".

== Composition ==
"Birthday Party" is composed in 4/4 common time and in the key of C-sharp major, with a tempo of 84 beats per minute (bpm).

== Personnel ==
Credits adapted from Tidal.

- Adam Met – backing vocals, instruments, composer
- Jack Met – main vocals, instruments, composer
- Ryan Met – backing vocals, instruments, composer, producer
- Chris Gehringer – mastering engineer
- Joe Zook – audio mixing
- Drew Allsbrook – audio mixing
- David Lynch – composer
- Peter Ivers – composer
- Ezra Donellan – vocals
- Ruth Kornblatt-Stier – cello
- Chris Berry – drums
- Emelia Suljic – violin

== Charts ==
Weekly chart performance for "Birthday Party"
Chart (2019)	Peak position
US Hot Rock & Alternative Songs (Billboard)	29
Czech Republic (Rádio – Top 100)	17
