= Neotheater =

Studio album by AJR
- Released: April 26, 2019
- Length: 44:28
- Labels: AJR; S-Curve
- Producer: Ryan Met

AJR chronology
The Click (2017)	Neotheater (2019)	OK Orchestra (2021)

Singles from Neotheater
- 1. "100 Bad Days" Released: January 29, 2019; 2. "Birthday Party" Released: March 12, 2019; 3. "Dear Winter" Released: April 5, 2019

Neotheater is the third studio album by American pop band AJR. It was released on April 26, 2019 by the band's label AJR Productions. The album was self-produced by the trio. It is a follow-up to the trio's 2017 album The Click (2017).

== Background and release ==
The 12 tracks were collectively described as "a coming of age tale that hears the band coming to terms with the sacrifices that come with growing older now that they are in their 20s". A description of the album also stated: "The buoyant and uplifting music is juxtaposed with darker lyrical narratives that touch on anxiety, naivete and searching for integrity."

This album contained three official singles. AJR released the lead single "100 Bad Days" on January 29, 2019. They followed up with the second single, "Birthday Party", on March 12, 2019. "Dear Winter" was later released as the third official single on April 5, 2019. On October 25, 2019, they released "Dear Winter 2.0," an alternate version of the original song with added instruments.

== Commercial performance ==
Neotheater debuted at number eight on the US Billboard 200 with 52,000 album-equivalent units (of which 32,000 were pure album sales). It is AJR's highest-peaking and first US top 10 album.

== Critical reception ==
Neotheater ratings
Review scores
Source	Rating
AllMusic	4/5 stars
Rolling Stone	3/5 stars

The album received generally positive reviews. Rolling Stone wrote in par, citing the bubbly tracks stepped in light orchestration, crisp hooks, and the social commentary, while AllMusic says that the album is "never less than refreshing".

== Track listing ==
All tracks are written by Jack and Ryan Met, except where noted.

Neotheater track listing
No.	Title	Writer(s)	Length
1.	"Next Up Forever"		4:17
2.	"Birthday Party"	J. Met; R. Met; David Lynch; Peter Ivers	3:44
3.	"100 Bad Days"		3:33
4.	"Don't Throw Out My Legos"		4:11
5.	"Break My Face"		3:46
6.	"Turning Out Pt. II"		3:43
7.	"The Entertainment's Here"		3:07
8.	"Karma"		4:05
9.	"Beats"		3:19
10.	"Wow, I'm Not Crazy"		3:17
11.	"Dear Winter"		2:48
12.	"Finale (Can't Wait to See What You Do Next)"		4:38
Total length:			44:28

Notes

- "Birthday Party" features a sample of the song "In Heaven", written by Peter Ivers and David Lynch and performed by Laurel Near in the 1977 film Eraserhead.
- Ryan Met is credited with writing two of the songs on this album by himself. One of those songs is "Dear Winter". Jack Met further discusses the origins of this song at 18:30 - 22:37 of source 7.

== Personnel ==
Credits adapted from the album's liner notes.

AJR

- Jack Met – lead vocals, guitar, melodica, ukulele, drums, percussion, keyboards, synthesizers, samples, programming, trumpet, composition
- Ryan Met – lead vocals, vocals, programming, keyboards, ukulele, trumpet, production, composition
- Adam Met – bass guitar, programming, samples, percussion, vocals

Additional personnel

- Daniel Rosenfeld – audio editing, composing
- Maikel Valdama – audio editing, mixing
- Drew Allsbrook – bass guitar (5, 10)
- Chris Berry – drums (2–4)
- Chris Cerrato – design
- Ezra Donellan – vocals (2)
- Samia Finnerty – vocals (5, 9, 12)
- Chris Gehringer – mastering
- Bruce Healey – choir arranger (1)
- JJ Kirkpatrick – trumpet (3–5, 7)
- Ruth Kornblatt-Stier – cello (1, 2, 6, 8, 9, 12)
- Emelia Suljic – violin (3–5, 7)
- Joe Zook – mixing

== Charts ==
=== Weekly charts ===
Chart (2019)	Peak position
Australian Digital Albums (ARIA)	49
Canadian Albums (Billboard)	95
US Billboard 200	8
US Independent Albums (Billboard)	1
US Top Album Sales (Billboard)	4
US Top Alternative Albums (Billboard)	2
US Top Rock Albums (Billboard)	1
US Indie Store Album Sales (Billboard)	9

=== Year-end charts ===
Chart (2019)	Position
US Top Rock Albums (Billboard)	79

== Certifications ==
Certifications for Neotheater
Region	Certification	Certified units/sales
United States (RIAA)	Gold	500,000^{‡}
^{‡} Sales+streaming figures based on certification alone.

== See also ==
- Neotheater World Tour
- List of 2019 albums
