= 100 Bad Days =

2019 single by AJR

Single by AJR

from the album Neotheater
- Released: January 29, 2019
- Recorded: 2018
- Genre: Pop
- Length: 3:32
- Label: S-Curve
- Songwriter(s): Jack Met; Adam Met; Ryan Met
- Producer(s): Ryan Met

AJR singles chronology
"Pretender" (2018)	"100 Bad Days" (2019)	"Birthday Party" (2019)

Music video
- "100 Bad Days" on YouTube

"100 Bad Days" is a song by American pop band AJR. It was released on January 29, 2019 via S-Curve Records as the lead single from the band's third studio album Neotheater.

== Background ==
After AJR released their second studio album, The Click (2017), they faced severe writer's block. In an interview, Ryan Met tells Billboard "We were at Columbia University [and] we were having a tough time because we had terrible writer's block, and "100 Bad Days" was actually the song that solved that writer's block". The song's writing began with a note on Jack's phone: "A million bad days make a million good stories". The band then tweaked it into a more unique idea, turning the line into the song's hook.

Jack Met explained the inspiration for the type of song to Billboard, which they summarized "They had written both pre-game songs and mid-party songs for when everyone is comfortable and having a great time, but they had never written a song for the party comedown". AJR created the song in the living room of their apartment in New York.

== Composition ==
"100 Bad Days" is composed in 4/4 common time in the key of B-flat major, with a tempo of 144 beats per minute (bpm).

== Music video ==
On March 7, 2019, an official music video directed by Tim Nackashi was released, featuring the band performing the song on drums in an empty room. The video heavily uses visual effects produced by London Alley, using chroma key to create surreal futuristic imagery and dismember the band as floating heads with disappearing and reappearing hands. During production, AJR favored creating a "visually compelling" and eerie music video in contrast to their previous story-driven videos. Nackashi abstractly conveys the song's meaning through this, stating that it's "a visual metaphor for [the band] being formed out of these rough experiences and memories they have, building the character of who they are". As of January 2024, the music video on YouTube has received over 29 million views.

== Critical reception ==
The song has received positive reception with Rolling Stone describing "100 Bad Days" as "a catchy song, blending motivational pop vibes, light orchestral flourishes and more into a smooth whirl". Billboard comments that "the brother[s] sing about drunken foolishness, heartbreak and empty audiences at their gigs, all of which are sure to cause some sadness but are masked by a catchy pop melody and soaring instrumentation". The band performed the song on Jimmy Kimmel Live! on March 12, 2019, re-creating some of the visual effects used in the song's music video.

== Personnel ==
Credits adapted from Tidal.

- Adam Met – vocals, instruments, composer
- Jack Met – main vocals, instruments, composer
- Ryan Met – vocals, instruments, composer, producer
- Chris Gehringer – mastering engineer
- Drew Allsbrook – audio mixing
- Joe Zook – mixing engineer
- Bruce Healey – arranger
- Chris Berry – drums
- JJ Kirkpatrick – trumpet
- Emelia Suljic – violin

== Nominations ==
At the 2019 Teen Choice Awards, AJR received a nomination in the Choice Rock Song category for "100 Bad Days", ultimately losing to Panic! at the Disco's "Hey Look Ma, I Made It".

Nominations for "100 Bad Days"
Year	Organization	Award	Result
2019	Teen Choice Awards	Choice Rock Song	Nominated

== Charts ==
=== Weekly charts ===
Weekly chart performance for "100 Bad Days"
Chart (2019)	Peak position
Canada Rock (Billboard)	43
New Zealand Hot Singles (RMNZ)	40
US Alternative Airplay (Billboard)	3
US Alternative Digital Song Sales (Billboard)	9
US Hot Rock & Alternative Songs (Billboard)	7
US Rock Airplay (Billboard)	10
US Rock Digital Song Sales (Billboard)	13

=== Year-end charts ===
Year-end chart performance for "100 Bad Days"
Chart (2019)	Position
US Hot Rock & Alternative Songs (Billboard)	9
US Rock Airplay (Billboard)	29

== Certifications ==
Certifications for "100 Bad Days"
Region	Certification	Certified units/sales
Australia (ARIA)	Gold	35,000^{‡}
Canada (Music Canada)	Platinum	80,000^{‡}
New Zealand (RMNZ)	Gold	15,000^{‡}
United States (RIAA)	2× Platinum	2,000,000^{‡}
^{‡} Sales+streaming figures based on certification alone.
