= David Guetta discography =

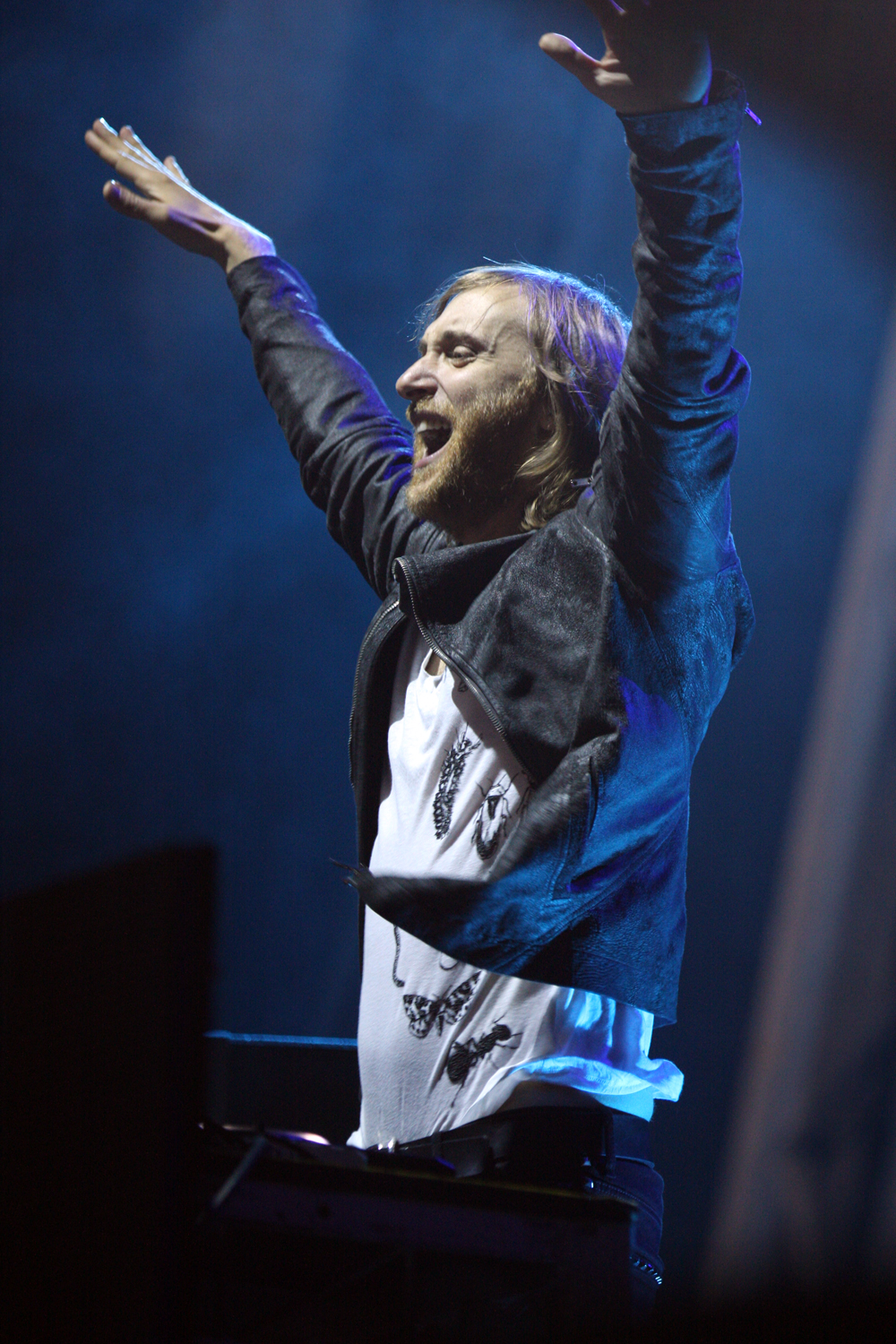
- David Guetta performing in Sydney in 2012
- Studio albums: 7
- Extended plays: 3
- Compilation albums: 11
- Singles: 181
- Music videos: 42
- Promotional singles: 11

French DJ and record producer David Guetta has released seven studio albums, eleven compilation albums, three extended plays, 180 singles (including seven as a featured artist), eleven promotional singles, and forty-two music videos.

Guetta released his debut single "Nation Rap", a collaboration with French rapper Sidney, in 1990. His debut studio album, Just a Little More Love, was released in June 2002. It peaked at number six in France and was certified two times Gold by the Syndicat National de l'Édition Phonographique (SNEP). Three of the album's singles attained commercial success in several European territories, including France and Belgium: "Just a Little More Love", "Love Don't Let Me Go" and "People Come People Go". Guetta Blaster, his second studio album, peaked at number 11 in France and produced four singles: "Money", "Stay", "The World Is Mine" and "In Love with Myself".

In 2006, a mash-up of "Love Don't Let Me Go" and "Walking Away" by British electronic music band The Egg was released, entitled "Love Don't Let Me Go (Walking Away)". It performed well in Europe, peaking at number three in the United Kingdom and becoming a top-forty hit in several other European countries. June 2007 saw the release of Guetta's third studio album, Pop Life, which peaked at number two in France and was certified Platinum by the SNEP. The album's lead single, "Love Is Gone", became a top-ten hit in countries such as France, Sweden and the United Kingdom. It also gave Guetta his first chart entry on the United States Billboard Hot 100, where it peaked at number 98. Pop Life produced an additional four singles: "Baby When the Light", "Delirious" featuring UK singer/songwriter Tara McDonald, "Tomorrow Can Wait" and "Everytime We Touch".

Guetta attained international success with his 2009 hit single "When Love Takes Over", which topped the charts in countries such as Belgium, Switzerland and the United Kingdom. It was followed by the single "Sexy Bitch", which topped the charts in eight different countries and gave Guetta his first top five hit on the Billboard Hot 100. Both singles were included on Guetta's fourth studio album, One Love, released in August 2009. Fueled by the success of the singles, One Love peaked at number one in France and reached the top ten in several other countries, including Australia and the United Kingdom.

Five more singles were released from the album, including the hit singles "One Love", "Memories", "Gettin' Over You" and "Who's That Chick?". In 2011, Guetta collaborated with American rapper Snoop Dogg for a remix of the latter's single "Wet", newly titled "Sweat". It topped the charts in countries such as France, Australia and Austria. Guetta released his fifth studio album, Nothing but the Beat, in August 2011. The album was a commercial success, topping the charts in France and numerous other countries. The album's first five singles—"Where Them Girls At", "Little Bad Girl", "Without You", "Titanium" and "Turn Me On"—all became top ten hits worldwide. The latter three singles also became top ten hits on the Billboard Hot 100. The follow-up singles "I Can Only Imagine", "She Wolf (Falling to Pieces)" and "Just One Last Time" also experienced commercial success.

== Albums ==
=== Studio albums ===
List of studio albums, with selected chart positions, sales figures and certifications
Title	Details	Peak chart positions										Sales figures	Certifications
Title	Details	FRA	AUS	AUT	BEL (WA)	GER	NLD	SWE	SWI	UK	US	Sales figures	Certifications
Just a Little More Love	Released: 10 June 2002; Label: Virgin; Formats: CD, LP, digital download	6	—	—	43	—	—	—	17	—	—	US: 4,500	SNEP: 2× Gold
Guetta Blaster	Released: 7 June 2004; Label: Virgin; Formats: CD, LP, digital download	11	—	—	29	—	—	—	45	—	—		SNEP: Platinum
Pop Life	Released: 18 June 2007; Label: Virgin; Formats: CD, LP, digital download	2	—	31	4	—	—	—	8	44	—	US: 18,000	SNEP: Platinum; IFPI SWI: Platinum
One Love	Released: 21 August 2009; Label: Virgin; Formats: CD, LP, digital download	1	4	3	1	2	4	33	2	2	70	US: 90,000	SNEP: Diamond; ARIA: 2× Platinum; BEA: 2× Platinum; BPI: 3× Platinum; BVMI: 5× Gold; IFPI AUT: 2× Platinum; IFPI SWI: 2× Platinum; NVPI: Platinum; MC: 2× Platinum
Nothing but the Beat	Released: 26 August 2011; Label: Virgin; Formats: CD, LP, digital download	1	3	1	1	1	3	19	1	2	5	FRA: 400,000; UK: 866,337; US: 490,000	SNEP: Diamond; ARIA: 2× Platinum; BEA: Platinum; BPI: 4× Platinum; BVMI: 3× Platinum; IFPI AUT: 2× Platinum; IFPI SWI: Platinum; MC: 2× Platinum; NVPI: Platinum; RIAA: Gold
Listen	Released: 21 November 2014; Label: What a Music, Parlophone, Atlantic; Formats: CD, LP, digital download	3	11	3	6	3	11	6	2	8	4	CAN: 6,500	SNEP: 2× Platinum; ARIA: Gold; BPI: Platinum; BVMI: Platinum; IFPI AUT: Gold; IFPI SWE: 2× Platinum; NVPI: Gold; RIAA: Gold
7	Released: 14 September 2018; Label: What a Music, Parlophone, Big Beat, Atlantic; Formats: CD, LP, digital download	4	9	7	5	7	9	13	2	9	37		SNEP: Platinum; BPI: Gold; FIMI: Gold; MC: Gold; RIAA: Gold
"—" denotes a record that did not chart or was not released in that territory.

=== Studio album reissues ===
List of studio album reissues
Title	Details
One More Love	Released: 26 November 2010; Label: Virgin; Formats: CD, digital download
Nothing but the Beat 2.0	Released: 21 August 2012; Label: Virgin; Formats: CD, digital download
Nothing but the Beat: Ultimate	Released: 26 August 2012; Label: Virgin; Formats: CD, digital download
Listen Again	Released: 27 November 2015; Label: Parlophone, What a Music; Formats: CD, digital download

=== Compilation albums ===
List of compilation albums, with selected chart positions
Title	Details	Peak chart positions							
Title	Details	FRA	AUT	BEL (WA)	ITA	SPA	SWI	UK Comp.	US Dance
Fuck Me I'm Famous (with Cathy Guetta)	Released: 1 July 2003 (FRA); Label: Virgin; Formats: CD, digital download	—	—	39	—	—	82	—	—
Fuck Me I'm Famous Vol. 2 (with Cathy Guetta)	Released: 18 July 2005 (FRA); Label: Virgin; Formats: CD, digital download	—	—	—	—	—	6	—	—
Fuck Me I'm Famous – Ibiza Mix 06 (with Cathy Guetta)	Released: 26 June 2006 (FRA); Label: Virgin; Formats: CD, digital download	—	—	62	—	—	—	—	—
Fuck Me I'm Famous – Ibiza Mix 08 (with Cathy Guetta)	Released: 9 June 2008 (FRA); Label: Virgin; Formats: CD, digital download	8	—	—	—	—	—	—	—
Fuck Me I'm Famous – Ibiza Mix 2009 (with Cathy Guetta)	Released: 12 June 2009 (FRA); Label: Virgin; Formats: CD, digital download	—	—	—	—	—	9	—	—
Fuck Me I'm Famous – Ibiza Mix 2010 (with Cathy Guetta)	Released: 26 July 2010 (FRA); Label: Virgin; Formats: CD, digital download	—	19	—	—	45	6	—	—
Fuck Me I'm Famous – Ibiza Mix 2011 (with Cathy Guetta)	Released: 10 June 2011 (FRA); Label: Virgin; Formats: CD, digital download	3	17	—	—	39	2	—	—
Fuck Me I'm Famous – Ibiza Mix 2012 (with Cathy Guetta)	Released: 29 June 2012 (DEN); Label: Virgin; Formats: CD, digital download	5	13	—	—	30	—	20	24
Fuck Me I'm Famous – Ibiza Mix 2013 (with Cathy Guetta)	Released: 24 June 2013 (DEN); Label: Virgin; Formats: CD, digital download	11	—	—	—	38	—	—	—
New Year's Eve Party	Released: 15 December 2023; Label: Warner; Formats: Digital download	—	—	—	37	—	—	—	—
"—" denotes a recording that did not chart or was not released in that territory.

=== Box sets ===
List of box sets, with selected chart positions
Title	Details	Peak chart positions
Title	Details	FRA
Pop Life / Guetta Blaster	Released: 14 September 2009 (FRA); Label: Virgin; Format: CD box set	135
Just a Little More Love / Pop Life	Released: 28 March 2011 (FRA); Label: Virgin; Format: CD box set	114
Original Album Series	Featuring the albums: Just a Little More Love; Guetta Blaster; Pop Life; One Love (Mix); One More Love; Released: 20 October 2014; Label: What a Music; Parlophone; Warner Music; Format: CD box set	—

== Extended plays ==
List of extended plays
Title	Details
iTunes Festival: London 2009	Released: 20 July 2009 (FRA); Label: EMI; Formats: Digital download
iTunes Festival: London 2012	Released: 5 October 2012 (FRA); Label: EMI; Formats: Digital download
Lovers on the Sun	Released: 30 June 2014 (FRA); Label: EMI; Formats: CD, digital download
New Rave (with Morten)	Released: 17 July 2020; Label: Parlophone; Formats: Digital download
Episode 2 (with Morten)	Released: 4 November 2022; Label: Spinnin' Records; Formats: Digital download
Men Machine (with Marten Hørger as Men Machine)	Released: 15 May 2026; Label: Spinnin' Records; Formats: Digital download

== Singles ==
=== As lead artist ===
==== 1990s ====
List of 1990s singles as lead artist, showing year released and album name
Title	Year	Album
"Nation Rap" (with Sidney)	1990	Non-album singles
"Up & Away" (with Robert Owens)	1994	Non-album singles

==== 2000s ====
List of 2000s singles as lead artist, with selected chart positions and certifications, showing year released and album name
Title	Year	Peak chart positions										Certifications	Album
Title	Year	FRA	AUS	AUT	BEL (WA)	GER	NLD	SWE	SWI	UK	US	Certifications	Album
"Just a Little More Love" (featuring Chris Willis)	2001	29	—	—	—	—	38	—	59	19	—		Just a Little More Love
"Love Don't Let Me Go" (featuring Chris Willis)	2002	4	—	—	7	—	19	—	13	46	—	SNEP: Gold; BEA: Gold	Just a Little More Love
"People Come People Go" (featuring Chris Willis)	2002	42	—	—	—	—	—	—	54	—	—		Just a Little More Love
"Give Me Something" (featuring Barbara Tucker)	2002	—	—	—	—	—	—	—	—	—	—		Just a Little More Love
"Just for One Day (Heroes)" (vs. David Bowie)	2003	54	—	—	—	—	—	—	—	73	—		Fuck Me I'm Famous
"Money" (featuring Chris Willis and Moné)	2004	63	—	—	—	—	—	—	52	—	—		Guetta Blaster
"Stay" (featuring Chris Willis)	2004	18	—	—	19	—	—	—	82	78	—		Guetta Blaster
"The World Is Mine" (featuring JD Davis)	2004	16	—	—	15	—	27	—	40	49	—		Guetta Blaster
"In Love with Myself" (featuring JD Davis)	2005	—	—	—	—	—	—	—	46	—	—		Guetta Blaster
"Love Don't Let Me Go (Walking Away)" (vs. The Egg)	2006	11	32	74	13	50	— (Note: "Love Don't Let Me Go (Walking Away)" did not enter the Dutch Top 40, but peaked at number three on the Dutch Tipparade chart, which acts as a 30-song extension to the Dutch Top 40.)	25	19	3	—	BPI: Silver	Fuck Me I'm Famous – Ibiza Mix 06
"Love Is Gone" (featuring Chris Willis)	2007	3	—	15	9	36	14	9	11	9	98	SNEP: Silver; IFPI SWI: Gold; BPI: Silver	Pop Life
"Baby When the Light" (with Steve Angello featuring Cozi)	2007	6	—	62	5	59	15	35	25	50	—	SNEP: Gold	Pop Life
"Delirious" (featuring Tara McDonald)	2008	16	—	27	2	59	12	51	16	—	—		Pop Life
"Tomorrow Can Wait" (with Chris Willis vs. Tocadisco)	2008	7	—	47	19	56	21	—	43	84	—		Pop Life
"Everytime We Touch" (with Chris Willis, Steve Angello and Sebastian Ingrosso)	2009	—	—	—	—	—	19	—	97	68	—		Pop Life
"When Love Takes Over" (featuring Kelly Rowland)	2009	2	6	3	1	2	2	2	1	1	76	SNEP: Gold; ARIA: 2× Platinum; IFPI AUT: 2× Platinum; BEA: Gold; BPI: 2× Platinum; BVMI: Platinum; GLF: Gold; IFPI SWI: Platinum; MC: Gold	One Love
"Sexy Bitch" (featuring Akon)	2009	1	1	1	1	1	3	2	2	1	5	SNEP: Diamond; ARIA: 5× Platinum; IFPI AUT: Platinum; BEA: Platinum; BPI: 3× Platinum; BVMI: Platinum; GLF: Platinum; IFPI SWI: 4× Platinum; MC: Gold; RIAA: 3× Platinum	One Love
"Grrrr"	2009	—	—	—	4	—	—	—	—	88	—		Fuck Me I'm Famous – Ibiza Mix 2009 and One More Love
"One Love" (featuring Estelle)	2009	—	36	20	—	18	19	—	48	46	—		One Love
"—" denotes a recording that did not chart or was not released in that territory.

==== 2010s ====
List of 2010s singles as lead artist, with selected chart positions and certifications, showing year released and album name
Title	Year	Peak chart positions										Certifications	Album
Title	Year	FRA	AUS	AUT	BEL (WA)	GER	NLD	SWE	SWI	UK	US	Certifications	Album
"Memories" (featuring Kid Cudi)	2010	5	3	2	1	6	4	14	7	15	46	SNEP: Gold; ARIA: 2× Platinum; IFPI AUT: 2× Platinum; BEA: Platinum; BVMI: 3× Platinum; GLF: 2× Platinum; BPI: 2× Platinum; RIAA: Platinum	One Love
"Gettin' Over You" (with Chris Willis featuring Fergie and LMFAO)	2010	1	5	4	12	15	21	28	11	1	31	ARIA: 2× Platinum; IFPI AUT: Gold; BVMI: Gold; GLF: Platinum; BPI: Platinum (Note: It is not entirely clear from the source what song was certified. The certification is for "Gettin' Over You", lists only Guetta and Willis and lists 2 October 2009 as the release date.)	One More Love
"Who's That Chick?" (featuring Rihanna)	2010	5	7	4	1	6	6	14	8	6	51	ARIA: 2× Platinum; IFPI AUT: Gold; BEA: Gold; BVMI: Gold; GLF: Platinum; BPI: 2× Platinum	One More Love
"Sweat" (vs. Snoop Dogg)	2011	1	1	1	1	2	5	9	2	4	— (Note: "Sweat" did not enter the Billboard Hot 100, but peaked at number 13 on the Bubbling Under Hot 100 Singles chart, which acts as a 25-song extension to the Hot 100.)	ARIA: 4× Platinum; IFPI AUT: Platinum; BEA: Gold; BVMI: 3× Gold; GLF: Platinum; IFPI SWI: Platinum; BPI: Gold	Nothing but the Beat
"Where Them Girls At" (featuring Flo Rida and Nicki Minaj)	2011	4	6	3	2	5	28	7	3	3	14	ARIA: 2× Platinum; IFPI AUT: Gold; BEA: Gold; BVMI: 3× Gold; GLF: Gold; IFPI SWI: Platinum; BPI: 2× Platinum; RIAA: Platinum	Nothing but the Beat
"Little Bad Girl" (featuring Taio Cruz and Ludacris)	2011	3	15	5	5	5	29	7	7	4	70	ARIA: Platinum; IFPI AUT: Gold; BEA: Gold; BVMI: Gold; IFPI SWI: Gold; BPI: Gold	Nothing but the Beat
"Without You" (featuring Usher)	2011	6	6	5	5	7	6	5	3	6	4	ARIA: 4× Platinum; IFPI AUT: Gold; BEA: Gold; BVMI: Gold; IFPI SWI: Platinum; BPI: 2× Platinum; RIAA: 2× Platinum	Nothing but the Beat
"Titanium" (featuring Sia)	2011	3	5	3	4	5	2	3	9	1	7	SNEP: Gold; ARIA: 5× Platinum; IFPI AUT: Platinum; BEA: Platinum; BVMI: 2× Platinum; IFPI SWI: 2× Platinum; BPI: 6× Platinum; RIAA: 2× Platinum	Nothing but the Beat
"Turn Me On" (featuring Nicki Minaj)	2011	10	3	5	10	6	26	29	6	8	4	ARIA: 3× Platinum; IFPI AUT: Gold; BPI: Platinum; BVMI: Gold; IFPI SWI: 2× Platinum; MC: 3× Platinum; RIAA: 2× Platinum	Nothing but the Beat
"The Alphabeat"	2012	44	—	—	—	85	—	—	—	—	—		Nothing but the Beat
"I Can Only Imagine" (featuring Chris Brown and Lil Wayne)	2012	40	47	17	—	32	— (Note: "I Can Only Imagine" did not enter the Dutch Top 40, but peaked at number four on the Dutch Tipparade chart, which acts as a 30-song extension to the Dutch Top 40.)	—	15	18	44	ARIA: Gold	Nothing but the Beat
"She Wolf (Falling to Pieces)" (featuring Sia)	2012	4	11	3	5	3	11	6	4	8	—	SNEP: Gold; ARIA: 2× Platinum; IFPI AUT: Gold; BEA: Gold; BVMI: Gold; IFPI SWI: Platinum; BPI: Platinum	Nothing but the Beat 2.0
"Just One Last Time" (featuring Taped Rai)	2012	14	—	31	18	45	35	—	44	20	—		Nothing but the Beat 2.0
"Play Hard" (featuring Ne-Yo and Akon)	2013	7	16	10	5	8	—	8	3	6	64	SNEP: Gold; ARIA: Platinum; BEA: Gold; BPI: 2× Platinum; BVMI: Platinum; IFPI AUT: Gold	Nothing but the Beat 2.0
"Ain't a Party" (with Glowinthedark featuring Harrison)	2013	45	76	30	—	46	—	—	57	—	—		Fuck Me I'm Famous – Ibiza Mix 2013
"Shot Me Down" (featuring Skylar Grey)	2014	6	3	9	3	13	17	16	6	4	—	ARIA: 2× Platinum; BPI: Gold; BVMI: Gold; GLF: 2× Platinum; MC: Gold	Listen
"Bad" (with Showtek featuring Vassy)	2014	6	5	15	6	19	13	2	28	22	— (Note: "Bad" did not enter the Billboard Hot 100, but peaked at number 13 on the Bubbling Under Hot 100 Singles chart.)	ARIA: 2× Platinum; BPI: Platinum; GLF: 5× Platinum; MC: Gold; RIAA: Gold	Listen
"Blast Off" (with Kaz James)	2014	33	—	—	—	—	—	—	—	—	—		Listen
"Lovers on the Sun" (featuring Sam Martin)	2014	5	2	1	4	1	11	4	2	1	— (Note: "Lovers on the Sun" did not enter the Billboard Hot 100, but peaked at number 21 on the Bubbling Under Hot 100 Singles chart.)	ARIA: Platinum; BVMI: Platinum; GLF: 3× Platinum; IFPI SWI: Platinum; BPI: Platinum	Listen
"Dangerous" (featuring Sam Martin)	2014	1	7	1	1	1	2	7	1	5	56	ARIA: Platinum; IFPI AUT: Gold; MC: Platinum; BVMI: 3× Gold; GLF: 3× Platinum; IFPI SWI: Platinum; BPI: Platinum; RIAA: Gold	Listen
"What I Did for Love" (featuring Emeli Sandé)	2015	30	20	10	35	16	34	58	37	6	—	ARIA: Gold; BPI: Platinum; BVMI: Gold; GLF: Gold	Listen
"Hey Mama" (featuring Nicki Minaj, Bebe Rexha and Afrojack)	2015	6	5	5	9	9	12	6	10	9	8	ARIA: 2× Platinum; BPI: Platinum; GLF: 2× Platinum; IFPI SWI: Platinum; MC: 3× Platinum; NVPI: Platinum; BVMI: Platinum; RIAA: 3× Platinum	Listen
"Sun Goes Down" (with Showtek featuring Magic! and Sonny Wilson)	2015	37	—	—	—	67	—	—	—	—	—		Listen
"Clap Your Hands" (with Glowinthedark)	2015	166	—	—	—	—	—	—	—	—	—		Listen Again
"Bang My Head" (featuring Sia and Fetty Wap)	2015	3	21	16	2	24	26	19	26	18	76	SNEP: Diamond; BPI: Platinum; BVMI: Gold; GLF: Platinum; IFPI SWI: Gold; RIAA: Gold	Listen Again
"Listen" (featuring John Legend)	2016	82	—	—	—	85	—	—	—	—	—		Listen
"No Worries" (with Disciples)	2016	—	90	—	—	—	—	—	—	—	—		Non-album singles
"This One's for You" (featuring Zara Larsson)	2016	1	67	2	2	1	5	3	1	16	—	SNEP: Diamond; BEA: Platinum; BPI: Gold; BVMI: Gold; IFPI AUT: Gold; IFPI SWI: Gold	Non-album singles
"Would I Lie to You" (with Cedric Gervais and Chris Willis)	2016	20	—	2	30	2	—	80	24	—	—	SNEP: Gold; BVMI: Platinum; IFPI AUT: Gold	Non-album singles
"Shed a Light" (with Robin Schulz featuring Cheat Codes)	2016	44	23	7	—	6	21	36	19	24	—	SNEP: Gold; BPI: Gold; BVMI: Platinum; IFPI AUT: Gold	Uncovered
"Light My Body Up" (featuring Nicki Minaj and Lil Wayne)	2017	16	29	47	—	33	—	55	39	64	— (Note: "Light My Body Up" did not enter the Billboard Hot 100, but peaked at number six on the Bubbling Under Hot 100 Singles chart.)		Non-album singles
"Another Life" (with Afrojack featuring Ester Dean)	2017	115	—	73	—	—	28	—	65	—	—		Non-album singles
"2U" (featuring Justin Bieber)	2017	3	2	2	13	3	5	2	2	5	16	SNEP: Platinum; ARIA: 3× Platinum; BEA: Platinum; BPI: Platinum; BVMI: Platinum; IFPI AUT: Gold; IFPI SWI: Platinum; MC: 2× Platinum; RIAA: Platinum	7
"Versace on the Floor" (vs. Bruno Mars)	2017	—	57	—	17	—	—	—	—	80	56		Non-album singles
"Complicated" (with Dimitri Vegas & Like Mike featuring Kiiara)	2017	—	—	51	6	77	22	44	37	—	—	BEA: Gold; BVMI: Gold; GLF: Gold	Non-album singles
"Dirty Sexy Money" (with Afrojack featuring Charli XCX and French Montana) (Note: "Dirty Sexy Money" appears on some exclusive limited editions of 7 as a bonus track, but is not on any standard edition of the album.)	2017	57	18	46	41	46	18	82	52	35	—	SNEP: Gold; ARIA: Platinum; BPI: Silver	Non-album singles
"So Far Away" (with Martin Garrix featuring Jamie Scott and Romy Dya) (Note: "So Far Away" appears on some exclusive limited editions of 7 as a bonus track, but is not on any standard edition of the album.)	2017	109	58	12	28	8	7	30	14	81	—	SNEP: Gold; ARIA: Gold; BEA: Gold; BPI: Silver; BVMI: Platinum; IFPI AUT: Gold; MC: Gold	Non-album singles
"Helium" (with Afrojack vs Sia)	2018	—	88	64	—	—	—	61	43	—	—		Non-album singles
"Mad Love" (with Sean Paul featuring Becky G) (Note: "Mad Love" also appears on some exclusive limited editions of 7 as a bonus track, but is not on any standard edition of the album.)	2018	39	—	33	30	10	10	— (Note: "Mad Love" did not enter the Swedish Singellista Chart, but peaked at number four on the Swedish Heatseeker Chart.)	36	22	—	SNEP: Platinum; BPI: Gold; BVMI: Gold; MC: Platinum	Mad Love the Prequel
"Like I Do" (with Martin Garrix and Brooks)	2018	20	73	20	—	23	13	15	22	29	—	SNEP: Gold; BPI: Gold; BVMI: Gold; IFPI AUT: Gold; MC: Platinum; RIAA: Gold	7
"Flames" (with Sia)	2018	2	19	7	3	7	2	9	2	7	—	SNEP: Diamond; ARIA: 2× Platinum; BEA: Gold; BPI: 2× Platinum; BVMI: Platinum; IFPI AUT: Platinum; IFPI SWI: Gold; MC: Platinum	7
"Your Love" (with Showtek) (Note: "Your Love" appears on some exclusive limited editions of 7 as a bonus track, but is not on any standard edition of the album.)	2018	83	—	—	—	70	—	32	53	—	—		Non-album single
"Don't Leave Me Alone" (featuring Anne-Marie)	2018	50	43	26	12	32	22	25	43	18	— (Note: "Don't Leave Me Alone" did not enter the Billboard Hot 100, but peaked at number 21 on the Bubbling Under Hot 100 Singles chart, which acts as a 25-song extension to the Hot 100.)	SNEP: Gold; ARIA: Platinum; BEA: Gold; BPI: Gold; MC: Gold	7
"Goodbye" (with Jason Derulo featuring Nicki Minaj and Willy William)	2018	30	33	57	15	47	10	16	50	26	— (Note: "Goodbye" did not enter the Billboard Hot 100, but peaked at number 8 on the Bubbling Under Hot 100 Singles chart, which acts as a 25-song extension to the Hot 100.)	SNEP: Gold; ARIA: Platinum; BPI: Gold	7
"Drive" (with Black Coffee featuring Delilah Montagu)	2018	—	—	—	—	—	—	—	—	—	—		7
"Ice Cold" (with Netsky)	2018	—	—	—	—	—	—	—	—	—	—		Non-album single
"Say My Name" (with Bebe Rexha and J Balvin)	2018	8	70	25	10	30	7	30	14	91	— (Note: "Say My Name" did not enter the Billboard Hot 100, but peaked at number 3 on the Bubbling Under Hot 100 Singles chart, which acts as a 25-song extension to the Hot 100.)	SNEP: Diamond; BEA: Gold; BPI: Gold; BVMI: Gold; IFPI AUT: Gold; MC: Platinum	7
"Better When You're Gone" (with Brooks and Loote)	2019	150	—	70	83	59	—	49	51	—	—		Non-album singles
"Ring the Alarm" (with Nicky Romero)	2019	—	—	—	—	—	—	—	—	—	—		Non-album singles
"This Ain't Techno" (with Tom Staar)	2019	—	—	—	—	—	—	—	—	—	—		Non-album singles
"Stay (Don't Go Away)" (featuring Raye)	2019	155	88	—	15	—	29	72	—	41	—	BPI: Silver	Non-album singles
"Instagram" (with Dimitri Vegas & Like Mike and Daddy Yankee featuring Afro Bros and Natti Natasha)	2019	104	—	45	36	29	5	99	53	—	—	BEA: 2× Platinum; BVMI: Gold	Non-album singles
"Thing for You" (with Martin Solveig)	2019	—	—	—	—	—	—	—	—	89	—		Non-album singles
"Never Be Alone" (with Morten featuring Aloe Blacc)	2019	—	— (Note: "Never Be Alone" did not enter the ARIA Singles Chart, but peaked at number 39 on the ARIA Digital Track Chart.)	—	—	—	—	—	69	—	—		Non-album singles
"Jump" (with Glowinthedark)	2019	—	—	—	—	—	—	—	—	—	—		Non-album singles
"Make It to Heaven" (with Morten and Raye)	2019	—	—	—	75	—	—	—	—	—	—		Non-album singles
"—" denotes a recording that did not chart or was not released in that territory.

==== 2020s ====
List of 2020s singles as lead artist, with selected chart positions and certifications, showing year released and album name
Title	Year	Peak chart positions										Certifications	Album
Title	Year	FRA	AUS	AUT	BEL (WA)	GER	NLD	SWE	SWI	UK	US	Certifications	Album
"Conversations in the Dark" (vs. John Legend)	2020	—	—	—	—	—	—	—	—	—	—		Non-album singles
"Detroit 3 AM" (with Morten)	2020	—	—	—	—	—	—	—	—	—	—		Non-album singles
"Kill Me Slow" (with Morten)	2020	—	—	—	—	—	—	—	—	—	—		New Rave
"Pa' La Cultura" (with Human(X) featuring Sofía Reyes, Abraham Mateo, De La Ghetto, Zion & Lennox, Manuel Turizo, Lalo Ebratt, Thalía and Maejor)	2020	—	—	—	—	—	—	—	—	—	—		Non-album singles
"Let's Love" (with Sia)	2020	47	94	56	2	30	7	—	47	53	—	SNEP: Platinum; BEA: Gold	Non-album singles
"Save My Life" (with Morten featuring Lovespeake)	2020	—	—	—	—	—	—	— (Note: "Save My Life" did not enter the Swedish Singles Chart, but peaked at number 12 on the Swedish Heatseeker chart.)	—	—	—		Non-album singles
"Dreams" (with Morten featuring Lanie Gardner)	2020	—	—	—	—	—	—	—	—	—	—		Non-album singles
"Big" (with Rita Ora and Imanbek featuring Gunna)	2021	—	—	—	—	95	—	—	68	53	—		Bang
"Floating Through Space" (with Sia)	2021	50	—	53	21	56	8	55	32	—	—	SNEP: Platinum; IFPI AUT: Gold	Music – Songs from and Inspired by the Motion Picture
"Bed" (with Joel Corry and Raye)	2021	139	20	53	35	34	4	76	43	3	—	SNEP: Gold; ARIA: 2× Platinum; BPI: 2× Platinum; BVMI: Gold; IFPI AUT: Gold	Another Friday Night
"Hero" (with Afrojack)	2021	192	—	—	—	—	3	— (Note: "Hero" did not enter the Swedish Singellista Chart, but peaked at number six on the Swedish Heatseeker Chart.)	—	—	—		Non-album singles
"Get Together"	2021	—	—	—	—	—	—	— (Note: "Get Together" did not enter the Swedish Singles Chart, but peaked at number six on the Swedish Heatseeker chart.)	—	—	—		Non-album singles
"Heartbreak Anthem" (with Galantis and Little Mix)	2021	—	46	53	—	57	13	36	51	3	—	BPI: 2× Platinum; IFPI AUT: Gold; RIAA: Gold	Rx
"Shine Your Light" (with Master KG featuring Akon)	2021	—	—	—	35	—	—	96	—	—	—		Non-album singles
"Impossible" (with Morten featuring John Martin)	2021	—	—	—	—	—	—	— (Note: "Impossible" did not enter the Swedish Singellista Chart, but peaked at number seven on the Swedish Heatseeker Chart.)	—	—	—		Non-album singles
"Remember" (with Becky Hill)	2021	—	34	—	—	—	3	51	96	3	—	SNEP: Gold; ARIA: 3× Platinum; BPI: 3× Platinum	Only Honest on the Weekend
"If You Really Love Me (How Will I Know)" (with MistaJam and John Newman)	2021	—	—	39	—	40	—	— (Note: "If You Really Love Me (How Will I Know)" did not enter the Swedish Singellista Chart, but peaked at number one on the Swedish Heatseeker Chart.)	66	27	—	BPI: Gold; IFPI AUT: Gold	Non-album singles
"Family" (featuring Bebe Rexha/Annalisa/Lune, Ty Dolla Sign and A Boogie wit da Hoodie)	2021	—	—	―	—	―	—	— (Note: "Family" did not enter the Swedish Singellista Chart, but peaked at number seven on the Swedish Heatseeker Chart.)	78	―	—		Non-album singles
"Alive Again" (with Morten and Roland Clark)	2021	—	—	―	—	―	—	—	―	―	—		Non-album singles
"Permanence" (with Morten)	2022	—	—	―	—	―	—	—	―	―	—		Non-album singles
"Redrum" (with Sorana)	2022	—	—	―	—	―	18	—	―	―	—		Non-album singles
"Silver Screen (Shower Screen)" (with Felix da Housecat and Miss Kittin)	2022	—	—	―	—	―	—	—	―	―	—		Non-album singles
"Trampoline" (with Afrojack featuring Missy Elliott, Bia and Doechii)	2022	—	—	―	—	―	—	—	―	―	—		Non-album singles
"What Would You Do?" (with Joel Corry and Bryson Tiller)	2022	—	—	―	—	―	13	— (Note: "What Would You Do?" did not enter the Swedish Singellista Chart, but peaked at number 11 on the Swedish Heatseeker Chart.)	―	21	—	BPI: Gold	Another Friday Night
"Crazy What Love Can Do" (with Becky Hill and Ella Henderson)	2022	47	100	66	13	26	6	57	29	5	—	SNEP: Platinum; ARIA: Platinum; BPI: 2× Platinum; BVMI: Gold; IFPI AUT: Platinum; MC: Gold	Only Honest on the Weekend and Everything I Didn't Say
"On Repeat" (with Robin Schulz)	2022	—	—	―	—	―	—	—	―	―	—		Pink
"Don't You Worry" (with Black Eyed Peas and Shakira)	2022	14	—	12	24	43	23	—	51	―	—	SNEP: Diamond; IFPI AUT: Gold; IFPI SWI: Gold	Elevation
"The Drop" (with Dimitri Vegas and Nicole Scherzinger featuring Azteck)	2022	—	—	―	—	―	33	—	―	―	—		Non-album singles
"Family Affair (Dance for Me)"	2022	197	—	―	—	―	—	—	―	―	—		Non-album singles
"Take Me Back" (with Lewis Thompson)	2022	—	—	―	—	―	—	—	―	―	—		Non-album singles
"I'm Good (Blue)" (with Bebe Rexha)	2022	4	1	1	1	1	1	1	2	1	4	SNEP: Diamond; ARIA: 4× Platinum; BPI: 3× Platinum; BVMI: 2× Platinum; IFPI AUT: 3× Platinum; RIAA: Platinum	Bebe
"Living Without You" (with Sigala and Sam Ryder)	2022	—	—	―	—	―	—	— (Note: "Living Without You" did not enter the Swedish Singellista Chart, but peaked at number 13 on the Swedish Heatseeker Chart.)	―	48	—	BPI: Silver	There's Nothing but Space, Man! and Every Cloud – Silver Linings
"It's Ours" (with Artbat and Idris Elba)	2022	—	—	―	—	―	—	—	―	―	—		Non-album single
"You Can't Change Me" (with Morten featuring Raye)	2022	—	—	―	—	―	—	—	―	―	—		Episode 2
"Damn (You've Got Me Saying)" (with Galantis and MNEK)	2022	—	—	―	—	―	—	— (Note: "Damn (You've Got Me Saying)" did not enter the Swedish Singellista Chart, but peaked at number two on the Swedish Heatseeker Chart.)	―	―	—		Rx
"Vibra" (with Anuel AA)	2022	—	―	—	―	—	—	―	―	—	―		LLNM2
"Saturday/Sunday" (with Jason Derulo)	2023	—	―	—	―	—	—	―	―	—	―		Non-album singles
"The Freaks" (with Marten Hørger)	2023	—	―	—	―	—	—	―	―	—	―		Non-album singles
"Here We Go Again" (with Oliver Tree)	2023	—	―	—	―	—	—	― (Note: "Here We Go Again" did not enter the Swedish Singellista Chart, but peaked at number 14 on the Swedish Heatseeker Chart.)	99	—	―		Non-album singles
"Baby Don't Hurt Me" (with Anne-Marie and Coi Leray)	2023	20	67	13	4	9	5	39	6	13	48	SNEP: Diamond; ARIA: Platinum; BPI: Platinum; BVMI: Platinum; IFPI AUT: Platinum	Super Unhealthy
"Live Without Love" (with Shouse)	2023	—	―	—	―	—	—	― (Note: "Live Without Love" did not enter the Swedish Singellista Chart, but peaked at number 18 on the Swedish Heatseeker Chart.)	―	—	―		Non-album singles
"Lost in the Rhythm" (with Morten)	2023	—	―	—	―	—	—	―	―	—	―		Non-album singles
"Where You Want" (with Riton and Jozzy)	2023	—	―	—	―	—	—	―	―	—	―		Non-album singles
"She Knows" (with Dimitri Vegas & Like Mike, Afro Bros and Akon)	2023	—	―	—	―	—	29	―	―	—	―		Non-album singles
"Something to Hold On To" (with Morten and Clementine Douglas)	2023	—	―	—	―	—	—	―	―	—	―		Non-album singles
"One in a Million" (with Bebe Rexha)	2023	—	98	—	27	—	13	― (Note: "One in a Million" did not enter the Swedish Singellista Chart, but peaked at number seven on the Swedish Heatseeker Chart.)	―	79	―		Non-album singles
"On My Love" (with Zara Larsson)	2023	44	―	—	―	80	—	3	56	15	―	SNEP: Platinum; BPI: Platinum; GLF: Gold	Venus
"Big FU" (featuring Ayra Starr and Lil Durk)	2023	—	―	—	―	—	—	―	―	—	―		Non-album singles
"When We Were Young (The Logical Song)" (with Kim Petras)	2023	45	―	62	8	29	5	87	32	51	―	SNEP: Platinum; BPI: Silver; BVMI: Gold	Non-album singles
"Vocation" (with Ozuna)	2023	—	—	—	—	—	—	—	—	—	―		Non-album singles
"All Night Long" (with Kungs and Izzy Bizu)	2024	118	—	―	—	―	—	— (Note: "All Night Long" did not enter the Swedish Singellista Chart, but peaked at number 15 on the Swedish Heatseeker Chart.)	―	―	—	SNEP: Gold	Non-album singles
"Down" (with Jason Derulo)	2024	—	—	—	—	—	—	— (Note: "Down" did not enter the Swedish Singellista Chart, but peaked at number 14 on the Swedish Heatseeker Chart.)	—	—	—		Nu King
"Lighter" (with Galantis and 5 Seconds of Summer)	2024	—	99	—	—	—	31	— (Note: "Lighter" did not enter the Swedish Singellista Chart, but peaked at number one on the Swedish Heatseeker Chart.)	—	78	―		Rx
"The Future Is Now" (with Morten)	2024	—	—	—	—	—	―	—	—	―	―		Non-album single
"The Truth" (with Morten)	2024	—	—	—	—	—	―	—	—	―	―		Non-album single
"I Don't Wanna Wait" (with OneRepublic)	2024	13	57	15	4	10	6	12	7	19	96	SNEP: Diamond; ARIA: Platinum; BVMI: Gold; BPI: Platinum	Artificial Paradise (deluxe)
"Feeling Good" (with Hypaton)	2024	—	—	—	—	—	―	— (Note: "Feeling Good" did not enter the Swedish Singellista Chart, but peaked at number seven on the Swedish Heatseeker Chart.)	—	―	―		Non-album singles
"Kill the Vibe" (with Morten and Prophecy)	2024	—	—	—	—	—	―	—	—	―	―		Non-album singles
"In the Dark" (with Armin van Buuren featuring Aldae)	2024	—	—	—	—	—	―	—	—	—	―		Non-album singles
"Switch" (with Cedric Gervais)	2024	—	—	—	—	—	―	—	—	—	―		Non-album singles
"Chills (Feel My Love)" (with Oliver Heldens and Fast Boy)	2024	—	—	—	—	—	―	—	—	—	―		Non-album singles
"Raving" (with Afrojack)	2024	—	—	—	—	—	―	—	—	—	―		Non-album singles
"Cry Baby" (with Clean Bandit and Anne-Marie)	2024	—	—	—	—	—	10	95	—	49	―	BPI: Silver	Non-album singles
"Never Going Home Tonight" (with Alesso and Madison Love)	2024	125	—	—	23	—	12	— (Note: "Never Going Home Tonight" did not enter the Swedish Singellista Chart, but peaked at number seven on the Swedish Heatseeker Chart.)	77	—	―	SNEP: Gold	Non-album singles
"Forever Young" (with Alphaville and Ava Max)	2024	38	81	36	12	10	7	— (Note: "Forever Young" did not enter the Swedish Singellista Chart, but peaked at number five on the Swedish Heatseeker Chart.)	34	—	90	SNEP: Platinum	Non-album singles
"Supernova Love" (with Ive)	2024	—	—	—	—	—	—	—	—	—	―		Non-album singles
"Home" (with Kiko and Olivier Giacomotto)	2024	—	—	—	—	—	—	—	—	—	―		Non-album singles
"Night in Detroit" (with Morten and Fedde Le Grand)	2025	—	—	—	—	—	—	—	—	—	―		Non-album singles
"My Life" (with Steve Aoki, Swae Lee and PnB Rock)	2025	—	—	—	—	—	—	—	—	—	—		Non-album singles
"Shout" (with Nicky Romero)	2025	—	—	—	—	—	—	—	—	—	—		Non-album singles
"Beautiful People" (with Sia)	2025	44	—	73	4	34	4	— (Note: "Beautiful People" did not enter the Swedish Singles Chart, but peaked at number six on the Swedish Heatseeker chart.)	19	55	—	SNEP: Platinum; BPI: Silver	Non-album singles
"Cuentale" (with Willy William and Nicky Jam)	2025	—	—	—	—	—	—	—	—	—	—		Non-album singles
"Think of Me" (with Hugel, Kehlani and Daecolm)	2025	—	—	—	—	79	21	— (Note: "Think of Me" did not enter the Swedish Singles Chart, but peaked at number 14 on the Swedish Heatseeker chart.)	—	—	—		Non-album singles
"A Better World" (with Cedric Gervais)	2025	—	—	—	—	—	—	—	—	—	—		Non-album singles
"Lighter" (with A7S and Wizkid)	2025	—	—	—	—	—	—	—	—	—	—		Non-album singles
"Together" (with Hypaton and Bonnie Tyler)	2025	60	—	—	25	—	—	—	—	—	—	SNEP: Platinum	Non-album singles
"Our Time" (with Afrojack, Martin Garrix and Amél)	2025	—	—	—	—	—	39	—	—	—	—		Non-album singles
"Pum Pum" (with Dimitri Vegas and Loreen)	2025	—	—	—	—	—	—	— (Note: "Pum Pum" did not enter the Swedish Singles Chart, but peaked at number 15 on the Swedish Heatseeker chart.)	—	—	—		Non-album singles
"Things I Haven't Told You" (with Audio Bullys and DJs from Mars)	2025	—	—	—	—	—	—	—	—	—	—		Non-album singles
"Lucky" (with Morten)	2025	—	—	—	—	—	—	—	—	—	—		Non-album singles
"After You" (with Kiko, Olivier Giacomotto and Faangs)	2025	—	—	—	—	—	—	—	—	—	—		Non-album singles
"Gone Gone Gone" (with Teddy Swims and Tones and I)	2025	77	85	—	4	21	4	85	48	47	51	SNEP: Platinum; BPI: Silver	Non-album singles
"Locked In" (with Morten and Trippie Redd)	2026	—	—	—	—	—	—	—	—	—	—		Non-album singles
"Upside Down" (with Jaden Bojsen)	2026	—	—	—	—	—	—	—	—	—	—		Non-album singles
"Prayer" (with Kiko and Olivier Giacomotto)	2026	—	—	—	—	—	—	—	—	—	—		Non-album singles
"Walked Away" (with Hypaton)	2026	—	—	—	—	—	—	—	—	—	—		Non-album singles
"Save Me Tonight" (with Jennifer Lopez)	2026	61	—	—	31	—	—	—	—	— (Note: "Save Me Tonight" did not enter the UK Singles Top 100, but debuted at number 18 on the UK Singles Downloads Chart.)	—	SNEP: Gold	TBA
"Ranjha" (with Diljit Dosanjh and Sia)	2026	—	—	—	—	—	—	—	—	—	—		Non-album singles
"Die Living" (with Illenium and Dustin Lynch)	2026	—	—	—	—	—	—	—	—	—	—		Non-album singles
"Awake Tonight" (with Afrojack and Sia)	2026	—	—	—	—	—	37	—	—	—	—		Non-album singles
"Sad Girls" (with Bebe Rexha)	2026	—	—	—	45	—	—	—	—	—	—		Dirty Blonde
"Run Run River (Angels Above Me)" (with Alok and Stick Figure)	2026	—	—	57	—	—	—	— (Note: "Run Run River (Angels Above Me)" did not enter the Swedish Singles Chart, but peaked at number 1 on the Swedish Heatseeker chart.)	—	—	—		Non-album single
"DNA (More Than a Game)" (with Andrea Bocelli, Ejae and Megan Thee Stallion)	2026	—	—	64	35	71	—	68	53	—	— (Note: "DNA (More Than a Game)" did not enter the Billboard Hot 100, but peaked at number 17 on the Digital Song Sales chart.)		Official FIFA World Cup 2026 Album (Opening Ceremony Edition)
"Shine" (with Hugel, French Montana and Aidan Martin)	2026	—	—	—	—	—	—	—	—	—	—		Non-album single
"Human" (with Third Party and John Martin)	2026	—	—	—	—	—	—	—	—	—	—		Non-album single
"La Révolution" (with Morten)	2026	—	—	—	—	—	—	—	—	—	—		Non-album single
"You and I, Me and You" (with Hypaton)	2026	—	—	—	—	—	—	—	—	—	—		Non-album single
"Mariô" (with Jast)	2026	—	—	—	—	—	—	—	—	—	—		Non-album single
"Caught Up (with Marlon Hoffstadt)	2026	—	—	—	—	—	—	—	—	—	—		Non-album single
"—" denotes a recording that did not chart or was not released in that territory.

=== As Jack Back ===
List of singles as Jack Back, with selected chart positions, showing year released and album name
Title	Year	Peak chart positions			Album
Title	Year	AUS	AUT	GER	Album
"Wild One Two" (featuring David Guetta, Nicky Romero and Sia)	2012	5	43	65	Nothing but the Beat 2.0
"Reach for Me"	2018	—	—	—	7
"(It Happens) Sometimes"	2018	—	—	—	Non-album single
"Grenade"	2018	—	—	—	7
"2000 Freaks Come Out" (vs. Cevin Fisher)	2019	—	—	—	Non-album single
"Survivor"	2019	—	—	—	Survivor / Put Your Phone Down (Low)
"Put Your Phone Down (Low)"	2019	—	—	—	Survivor / Put Your Phone Down (Low)
"Body Beat" (with Tom Staar)	2020	—	—	—	Non-album singles
"Superstar DJ"	2020	—	—	—	Non-album singles
"I've Been Missing You" (with Guz and Ferreck Dawn)	2021	—	—	—	Non-album singles
"Supercycle" (with Citizen Kain and Kiko)	2021	—	—	—	Non-album singles
"Give Me Something to Hold" (with Themba)	2024	—	—	—	Non-album singles
"Freedom 2024" (with CeCe Rogers)	2024	—	—	—	Non-album singles
"—" denotes a recording that did not chart or was not released in that territory.

=== As featured artist ===
List of singles as featured artist, with selected chart positions and certifications, showing year released and album name
Title	Year	Peak chart positions										Certifications	Album
Title	Year	FRA	AUS	AUT	BEL (WA)	GER	NLD	SWE	SWI	UK	US	Certifications	Album
"Wavin' Flag" (Celebration Mix) (K'naan featuring will.i.am and David Guetta)	2010	—	—	—	—	—	—	—	—	—	—		Troubadour: Champion Edition
"Commander" (Kelly Rowland featuring David Guetta)	2010	—	—	23	—	16	33	26	46	9	—	BPI: Platinum	Here I Am
"Club Can't Handle Me" (Flo Rida featuring David Guetta)	2010	72	3	3	4	4	2	11	3	1	9	RIAA: 3× Platinum; ARIA: 3× Platinum; BPI: 2× Platinum; BVMI: 3× Gold; IFPI SWI: Platinum; MC: 3× Platinum	Only One Flo (Part 1)
"LaserLight" (Jessie J featuring David Guetta)	2012	—	48	—	—	—	— (Note: "LaserLight" did not enter the Dutch Top 40, but peaked at number five on the Dutch Tipparade chart, which acts as a 30-song extension to the Dutch Top 40.)	—	—	5	—	ARIA: Gold; BPI: Gold	Who You Are
"Rest of My Life" (Ludacris featuring Usher and David Guetta)	2012	152	16	25	—	32	—	—	42	41	72	ARIA: Platinum	Fast & Furious 6
"Right Now" (Rihanna featuring David Guetta)	2013	31	39	25	37	43	28	25	32	36	50	ARIA: Gold; BPI: Silver; IFPI SWE: Platinum; RIAA: Gold	Unapologetic
"—" denotes a recording that did not chart or was not released in that territory.

== Promotional singles ==
List of promotional singles, with selected chart positions, showing year released and album name
Title	Year	Peak chart positions									Certifications	Album
Title	Year	FRA	AUS	AUT	CAN	GER	SWE	SWI	UK	US	Certifications	Album
"Time" (featuring Chris Willis)	2004	—	—	—	—	—	—	—	—	—		Guetta Blaster
"Get Up" (featuring Chris Willis)	2004	—	—	—	—	—	—	—	—	—		Guetta Blaster
"Gettin' Over" (featuring Chris Willis)	2009	—	—	—	—	—	—	—	86	—	BPI: Platinum	One Love
"I Wanna Go Crazy" (featuring will.i.am)	2009	—	—	—	83	—	—	—	92	—		One Love
"Louder than Words" (with Afrojack featuring Niles Mason)	2010	—	—	35	—	39	—	—	—	—		Fuck Me I'm Famous – Ibiza Mix 2010
"Lunar" (with Afrojack)	2011	50	—	58	—	84	—	—	90	—		Nothing but the Beat
"Night of Your Life" (featuring Jennifer Hudson)	2011	27	37	7	30	12	31	24	35	81		Nothing but the Beat
"Metropolis" (with Nicky Romero)	2012	41	—	—	—	—	—	—	—	—		Nothing but the Beat 2.0
"Freedom" (with CeCe Rogers)	2018	—	—	—	—	—	—	—	—	—		7
"—" denotes a recording that did not chart or was not released in that territory.

== Other charted songs ==
List of songs, with selected chart positions, showing year released and album name
Title	Year	Peak chart positions								Album
Title	Year	FRA	AUS	BEL (WA)	GER	SWE	SWI	UK	US Dance	Album
"How Soon Is Now" (with Sebastian Ingrosso and Dirty South featuring Julie McKnight)	2009	—	—	—	—	52	—	—	—	One Love
"On the Dancefloor" (featuring will.i.am and apl.de.ap)	2009	—	—	24	—	—	—	—	—	One Love
"Missing You" (featuring Novel)	2009	85	—	—	—	—	—	—	—	One Love
"Crank It Up" (featuring Akon)	2011	64	49	—	43	—	—	96	—	Nothing but the Beat
"Sunshine" (with Avicii)	2011	—	—	—	—	59	—	—	—	Nothing but the Beat
"The Whisperer" (featuring Sia)	2014	96	—	—	—	—	—	—	—	Listen
"Goodbye Friend" (featuring The Script)	2014	142	—	—	93	—	—	—	45	Listen
"I'll Keep Loving You" (featuring Jaymes Young and Birdy)	2014	144	—	—	96	—	—	—	39	Listen
"Lift Me Up" (featuring Nico & Vinz and Ladysmith Black Mambazo)	2014	157	—	—	—	—	—	—	41	Listen
"No Money No Love" (with Showtek featuring Elliphant and Ms. Dynamite)	2014	159	—	—	94	—	—	—	—	Listen
"Battle" (featuring Faouzia)	2018	—	—	—	—	—	80	—	26	7
"—" denotes a recording that did not chart or was not released in that territory.

== Guest appearances ==
List of non-single guest appearances, with other performing artists, showing year released and album name
Title	Year	Other artist(s)	Album
"Everything Wonderful"	2010	The Black Eyed Peas featuring David Guetta	The Beginning
"Something for the DJs"	2011	Pitbull featuring Afrojack and David Guetta	Planet Pit
"Voodoo"	2018	Stargate and Los Unidades featuring Tiwa Savage, Wizkid, Danny Ocean and David Guetta	Global Citizen EP
"Make My Day"	2023	Coi Leray and David Guetta	Coi
"If It's Okay"	2024	Nicki Minaj, Davido and David Guetta	The Pinkprint Tenth Anniversary Edition

== Music videos ==
=== As lead artist ===
List of music videos as lead artist, showing year released and directors
Title	Year	Director(s)
"Nation Rap" (with Sidney)	1991	None
"Just a Little More Love" (featuring Chris Willis)	2001	Fabien Dufils
"Just a Little More Love" (UK version) (featuring Chris Willis)	2001	Ben Hume-Paton
"Just a Little More Love" (Wally Lopez Remix) (featuring Chris Willis)	2002	Jean-Charles Carré
"Love Don't Let Me Go" (featuring Chris Willis)	2002	Olivier Boscovitch, Vincent Renaud
"People Come People Go" (featuring Chris Willis)	2002	Don Cameron
"Just for One Day (Heroes)" (vs. David Bowie)	2003	Richard Fenwick
"Money" (featuring Chris Willis and Moné)	2004	Nathalie Canguilhem
"Stay" (featuring Chris Willis)	2004	Frédéric Grivois
"The World Is Mine" (featuring JD Davis)	2004	Stuart Gosling
"Love Don't Let Me Go (Walking Away)" (vs. The Egg)	2006	Marcus Adams
"Love Is Gone" (featuring Chris Willis)	2007	Denis Thybaud
"Baby When the Light" (featuring Cozi)	2007	Denis Thybaud
"Delirious" (featuring Tara McDonald)	2008	Denis Thybaud
"Tomorrow Can Wait" (with Chris Willis vs. Tocadisco)	2008	Denis Thybaud
"Everytime We Touch" (with Chris Willis, Steve Angello and Sebastian Ingrosso)	2009	Denis Thybaud
"When Love Takes Over" (featuring Kelly Rowland)	2009	Jonas Åkerlund
"Sexy Bitch" (featuring Akon)	2009	Stephen Schuster
"One Love" (featuring Estelle)	2009	Little X
"Memories" (featuring Kid Cudi)	2010	Keith Schofield
"Gettin' Over You" (with Chris Willis featuring Fergie and LMFAO)	2010	Rich Lee
"Who's That Chick?" (featuring Rihanna)	2010	Jonas Åkerlund
"Sweat" (vs. Snoop Dogg)	2011	Dylan Brown
"Where Them Girls At" (featuring Flo Rida and Nicki Minaj)	2011	Dave Meyers
"Little Bad Girl" (featuring Taio Cruz and Ludacris)	2011	Dave Meyers
"Without You" (featuring Usher)	2011	Christopher Hewitt
"Titanium" (featuring Sia)	2011	David Wilson
"Turn Me On" (featuring Nicki Minaj)	2012	Sanji
"The Alphabeat"	2012	So Me
"I Can Only Imagine" (featuring Chris Brown and Lil Wayne)	2012	Colin Tilley
"She Wolf (Falling to Pieces)" (featuring Sia)	2012	Hiro Murai
"Metropolis" (with Nicky Romero)	2012	Mr. Brainwash
"Just One Last Time" (featuring Taped Rai)	2012	Colin Tilley
"Play Hard" (featuring Ne-Yo and Akon)	2013	Andreas Nilsson
"One Voice" (featuring Mikky Ekko)	2013	Michael Jurkovac
"Lovers on the Sun" (featuring Sam Martin)	2014	Marc Klasfeld
"Dangerous" (featuring Sam Martin)	2014	Jonas Åkerlund
"Hey Mama" (featuring Nicki Minaj, Bebe Rexha and Afrojack)	2015	None
"Flames" (with Sia)	2018	Lior Molcho
"Don't Leave Me Alone" (featuring Anne-Marie)	2018	Hannah Lux-Davies
"Say My Name"(with Bebe Rexha and J Balvin)	2018	Hannah Lux-Davies
"Stay (Don't Go Away)" (featuring Raye)	2019	Ethan Lader
"Instagram" (with Dimitri Vegas & Like Mike, Daddy Yankee, Afro Bros & Natti Natasha)	2019	Unknown
"Let's Love" (with Sia)	2020	Ethan Lader
"Dreams" (with Morten, featuring Lanie Gardner)	2020	Courtney Phillips
"Big" (with Rita Ora and Imanbek, featuring Gunna)	2021	Unknown
"Floating Through Space" (with Sia)	2021	Lior Molcho
"Bed" (with Joel Corry and Raye)	2021	Elliott Simpson
"Hero" (with Afrojack)	2021	Unknown
"Heartbreak Anthem" (with Galantis and Little Mix)	2021	Samuel Douek
"If You Really Love Me (How Will I Know)" (with John Newman and MistaJam)	2021	Samuel Douek
"Remember" (with Becky Hill)	2021	Carly Cussan
"Crazy What Love Can Do" (with Becky Hill and Ella Henderson)	2022	Michael Holyk

=== As featured artist ===
List of music videos as featured artist, showing year released and directors
Title	Year	Director(s)
"Wavin' Flag" (Celebration Mix) (K'naan featuring will.i.am and David Guetta)	2010	Nabil
"Commander" (Kelly Rowland featuring David Guetta)	2010	Masashi Muto
"Club Can't Handle Me" (Flo Rida featuring David Guetta)	2010	Marc Klasfeld
"LaserLight" (Jessie J featuring David Guetta)	2012	Emil Nava
"Rest of My Life" (Ludacris featuring Usher and David Guetta)	2012	Christopher Sims

=== Guest appearances ===
Title	Year	Artist	Director(s)	Ref.
"Imagine" (UNICEF: World version)	2014	Various	Michael Jurkovac	
