= List of awards and nominations received by David Guetta =

David Guetta awards and nominations
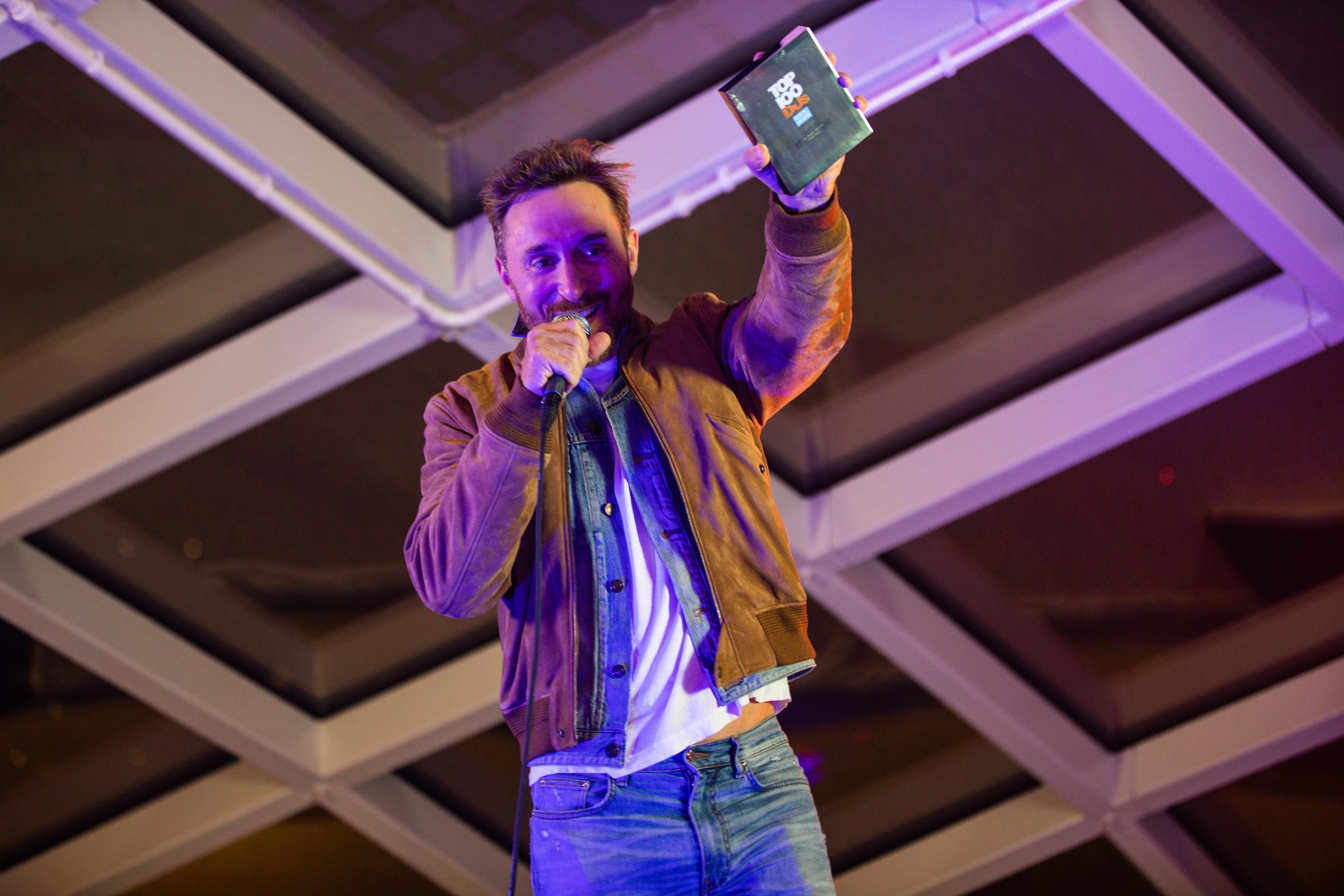
- Guetta being crowned number 1 DJ by DJ Mag in 2020
Awards and nominations
Award	Wins	Nominations
American Music Awards	2	5
Billboard Music Awards	3	21
Brit Awards	1	7
EDM Awards	6	35
Grammy Awards	2	15
iHeartRadio Music Awards	3	12
MTV EMAs	6	20
MTV VMAs	0	7

Totals (Note: Certain award groups do not simply award one winner. They acknowledge several different recipients, have runners-up, and have third place. Since this is a specific recognition and is different from losing an award, runner-up mentions are considered wins in this award tally. For simplification and to avoid errors, each award in this list has been presumed to have had a prior nomination.)
- Wins: 59
- Nominations: 301

This is a list of awards and nominations received by French disc jockey and record producer David Guetta.

== Awards and nominations ==
Award	Year	Work	Category	Result	Ref.
American Music Awards	2012	Himself	Favorite Electronic Dance Music Artist	Won	
American Music Awards	2015	Himself	Favorite Electronic Dance Music Artist	Nominated	
American Music Awards	2021	Himself	Favorite Electronic Dance Music Artist	Nominated	
American Music Awards	2026	"Gone Gone Gone" (with Teddy Swims and Tones and I)	Collaboration of the Year	Nominated	
American Music Awards	2026	David Guetta	Best Dance/Electronic Artist	Won	
APRA Music Awards	2012	"Titanium" (with Sia)	Dance Work of the Year	Nominated	
APRA Music Awards	2019	"Flames" (with Sia)	Dance Work of the Year	Nominated	
APRA Music Awards	2022	"Let’s Love" (with Sia)	Most Performed Dance/Electronic Work	Nominated	
APRA Music Awards	2026	"Beautiful People" (with Sia)	Most Performed Dance/Electronic Work	Nominated	
APRA Music Awards	2026	"Beautiful People" (with Sia)	Song of the Year	Shortlisted	
ARIA Music Awards	2012	Himself	Best International Artist	Nominated	
Billboard Music Awards	2011	David Guetta	Top Dance Artist	Nominated	
Billboard Music Awards	2012	David Guetta	Top Dance Artist	Nominated	
Billboard Music Awards	2012	Nothing but the Beat	Top Dance Album	Nominated	
Billboard Music Awards	2012	"Without You" (featuring Usher)	Top Dance Song	Nominated	
Billboard Music Awards	2012	"Without You" (featuring Usher)	Top Streaming Song (Audio)	Nominated	
Billboard Music Awards	2013	David Guetta	Top Dance Artist	Nominated	
Billboard Music Awards	2013	David Guetta	Top EDM Artist	Won	
Billboard Music Awards	2013	Nothing but the Beat	Top Dance Album	Nominated	
Billboard Music Awards	2013	Nothing but the Beat	Top EDM Album	Nominated	
Billboard Music Awards	2013	"Titanium" (featuring Sia)	Top Dance Song	Nominated	
Billboard Music Awards	2013	"Titanium" (featuring Sia)	Top EDM Song	Nominated	
Billboard Music Awards	2016	David Guetta	Top Dance/Electronic Artist	Won	
Billboard Music Awards	2016	Listen	Top Dance/Electronic Album	Nominated	
Billboard Music Awards	2016	"Hey Mama" (featuring Nicki Minaj, Bebe Rexha and Afrojack)	Top Dance/Electronic Song	Nominated	
Billboard Music Awards	2019	7	Top Dance/Electronic Album	Nominated	
Billboard Music Awards	2022	David Guetta	Top Dance Artist	Nominated	
Billboard Music Awards	2023	David Guetta	Top Dance Artist	Nominated	
Billboard Music Awards	2023	"I'm Good (Blue)" (with Bebe Rexha)	Top Collaboration	Nominated	
Billboard Music Awards	2023	"I'm Good (Blue)" (with Bebe Rexha)	Top Billboard Global (Excl. U.S.) Song	Nominated	
Billboard Music Awards	2023	"I'm Good (Blue)" (with Bebe Rexha)	Top Dance/Electronic Song	Won	
Billboard Music Awards	2023	"Baby Don't Hurt Me" (with Anne-Marie and Coi Leray)	Top Dance/Electronic Song	Nominated	
Brit Awards	2011	David Guetta	International Male Solo Artist	Nominated	
Brit Awards	2012	David Guetta	International Male Solo Artist	Nominated	
Brit Awards	2022	"Remember" (with Becky Hill)	Song of the Year	Nominated	
Brit Awards	2022	"Bed" (with Joel Corry & Raye)	Song of the Year	Nominated	
Brit Awards	2022	"Heartbreak Anthem" (with Galantis & Little Mix)	International Song of the Year	Nominated	
Brit Awards	2023	Himself	Producer of the Year	Won	
Brit Awards	2023	"I'm Good (Blue)" (with Bebe Rexha)	International Song of the Year	Nominated	
Electronic Dance Music Awards	2018	"Versace on the Floor (remix)" (with Bruno Mars)	Remix of the Year – Radio Airplay	Won	
Electronic Dance Music Awards	2018	"2U" (with Justin Bieber & Afrojack)	Best Rise/Drop	Nominated	
Electronic Dance Music Awards	2019	"Like I Do" (with Martin Garrix & Brooks)	Dance Song of the Year (Non Remix)	Nominated	
Electronic Dance Music Awards	2022	Himself	Artist of The Year	Nominated	
Electronic Dance Music Awards	2022	Himself	Producer of The Year	Nominated	
Electronic Dance Music Awards	2022	"BED" (with Joel Corry, RAYE)	Best Collaboration	Nominated	
Electronic Dance Music Awards	2022	"Heartbreak Anthem" (with Galantis & Little Mix)	Dance/Electropop Song of The Year	Nominated	
Electronic Dance Music Awards	2022	"Love Tonight" (with Shouse)	Remix of The Year	Nominated	
Electronic Dance Music Awards	2022	"Dakiti" (with Bad Bunny & Jhay Cortez)	Best Down Tempo Turned Up	Nominated	
Electronic Dance Music Awards	2022	"Alive Again" (with MORTEN & Roland Clark)	Main Stage Song of The Year	Nominated	
Electronic Dance Music Awards	2022	David Guetta United at Home, Dubai Edition	Best Livestream	Nominated	
Electronic Dance Music Awards	2022	David Guetta – Playlist	Best Radio Show	Nominated	
Electronic Dance Music Awards	2023	Himself	Male Artist of The Year	Nominated	
Electronic Dance Music Awards	2023	Himself	Producer of The Year	Nominated	
Electronic Dance Music Awards	2023	Himself	Dance Radio Artist of The Year	Nominated	
Electronic Dance Music Awards	2023	"I'm Good (Blue)" (with Bebe Rexha)	Dance Song of The Year (Radio)	Won	
Electronic Dance Music Awards	2023	"I'm Good (Blue)" (with Bebe Rexha)	Best Use of Sample	Won	
Electronic Dance Music Awards	2023	"I'm Good (Blue)" (with Bebe Rexha)	Music Video of The Year	Nominated	
Electronic Dance Music Awards	2023	"Crazy What Love Can Do" (with Becky Hill & Ella Henderson)	Music Video of The Year	Nominated	
Electronic Dance Music Awards	2023	"Satisfaction"(with Benny Benassi)	Best Remake Rewind	Nominated	
Electronic Dance Music Awards	2024	Himself	Male Artist of The Year	Nominated	
Electronic Dance Music Awards	2024	Himself	Producer of The Year	Nominated	
Electronic Dance Music Awards	2024	Himself	Remixer of The Year	Nominated	
Electronic Dance Music Awards	2024	Himself	Dance Radio Artist of The Year	Won	
Electronic Dance Music Awards	2024	"Baby Don't Hurt Me" (with Anne-Marie & Coi Leray)	Dance Radio Song Of The Year	Won	
Electronic Dance Music Awards	2024	"Baby Don't Hurt Me" (with Anne-Marie & Coi Leray)	Best Use of Sample	Won	
Electronic Dance Music Awards	2024	"On My Love" (with Zara Larsson)	Music Video Of The Year	Nominated	
Electronic Dance Music Awards	2024	"Players" (with Coi Leray)	Remix Of The Year	Nominated	
Electronic Dance Music Awards	2024	"Players" (with Coi Leray)	Best Down Tempo Turned Up	Nominated	
Electronic Dance Music Awards	2024	"Be My Love" (with La Bouche & Hypathon)	Remake of the Year	Nominated	
Electronic Dance Music Awards	2025	"Never Going Home Tonight" (with Alesso and Madison Love)	Dance Song Of The Year	Nominated	
Electronic Dance Music Awards	2025	"Lighter" (with Galantis and 5 Seconds of Summer)	Dance / Electro Pop Song of the Year	Nominated	
Electronic Dance Music Awards	2025	"Switch" (with Cedric Gervais)	Favorite Club Track	Nominated	
Electronic Dance Music Awards	2025	"Switch" (with Cedric Gervais)	Main Stage/Festival Song of the Year	Nominated	
Electronic Dance Music Awards	2025	"Forever Young" (with Alphaville and Ava Max)	Best Use of Sample	Nominated	
Eurodanceweb Awards	2002	"Love Don't Let Me Go"	Song of the Year	5th Place	
Global Awards	2018	Himself	Best Pop Dance	Nominated	
Global Awards	2023	Himself	Best Dance	Nominated	
Global Awards	2023	"I'm Good (Blue)" (with Bebe Rexha)	Best Social Trended Song	Nominated	
Global Awards	2024	Himself	Best Male	Nominated	
Global Awards	2024	Himself	Best Dance	Nominated	
Grammy Awards	2006	"Flashdance" (Guetta & Garraud F*** Me I'm Famous Remix)	Best Remixed Recording, Non-Classical	Nominated	
Grammy Awards	2010	The E.N.D.	Album of the Year (as Producer)	Nominated	
Grammy Awards	2010	"I Gotta Feeling"	Record of the Year (as Producer)	Nominated	
Grammy Awards	2010	"When Love Takes Over" (featuring Kelly Rowland)	Best Dance Recording	Nominated	
Grammy Awards	2010	One Love	Best Dance/Electronic Album	Nominated	
Grammy Awards	2010	"When Love Takes Over" (Electro Extended Remix)	Best Remixed Recording, Non-Classical	Won	
Grammy Awards	2011	"Revolver" (David Guetta's One Love Club Remix) (featuring Afrojack)	Best Remixed Recording, Non-Classical	Won	
Grammy Awards	2012	"Sunshine" (featuring Avicii)	Best Dance Recording	Nominated	
Grammy Awards	2012	Nothing but the Beat	Best Dance/Electronic Album	Nominated	
Grammy Awards	2022	"Hero" (with Afrojack)	Best Dance/Electronic Recording	Nominated	
Grammy Awards	2023	"I'm Good (Blue)" (with Bebe Rexha)	Best Dance/Electronic Recording	Nominated	
Grammy Awards	2024	"Baby Don't Hurt Me" (with Anne-Marie and Coi Leray)	Best Pop Dance Recording	Nominated	
Grammy Awards	2024	"One in a Million" (with Bebe Rexha)	Best Pop Dance Recording	Nominated	
Grammy Awards	2025	"A Bar Song (Tipsy)" (Remix)	Best Remixed Recording, Non-Classical	Nominated	
Grammy Awards	2026	"Golden" (David Guetta REM/X)	Best Remixed Recording, Non-Classical	Nominated	
Hungarian Music Awards	2008	Pop Life	International Electronic Music Album of the Year	Won	
Hungarian Music Awards	2010	One Love	International Electronic Music Album of the Year	Won	
Hungarian Music Awards	2012	Nothing but the Beat	International Electronic Music Album of the Year	Nominated	
Hungarian Music Awards	2016	Listen	International Electronic Music Album of the Year	Nominated	
Hungarian Music Awards	2017	Himself (as songs producer)	Best Electronic Music Album or Audio Recordings	Nominated	
Hungarian Music Awards	2018	Himself (as songs producer)	Best Electronic Music Album or Audio Recordings	Nominated	
Hungarian Music Awards	2020	Himself (as songs producer)	Best Electronic Music Album or Audio Recordings	Nominated	
Hungarian Music Awards	2021	Himself (as songs producer)	Best Electronic Music Album or Audio Recordings	Nominated	
Hungarian Music Awards	2023	Himself (as songs producer)	Best Electronic Music Album or Audio Recordings	Won	
iHeartRadio Music Awards	2016	Himself	Dance Artist of the Year	Nominated	
iHeartRadio Music Awards	2016	"Hey Mama" (with Nicki Minaj, Bebe Rexha and Afrojack)	Dance Song of the Year	Nominated	
iHeartRadio Music Awards	2022	Himself	Dance Artist of the Year	Won	
iHeartRadio Music Awards	2022	"Bed" (with Joel Corry and Raye)	Dance Song of the Year	Nominated	
iHeartRadio Music Awards	2022	"Heartbreak Anthem" (with Little Mix and Galantis)	Dance Song of the Year	Nominated	
iHeartRadio Music Awards	2023	"Don't You Worry" (with Black Eyed Peas and Shakira)	Best Music Video	Nominated	
iHeartRadio Music Awards	2023	"I'm Good (Blue)" (with Bebe Rexha)	Dance Song of the Year	Won	
iHeartRadio Music Awards	2023	"I'm Good (Blue)" (with Bebe Rexha)	Favorite Use of a Sample	Nominated	
iHeartRadio Music Awards	2024	"I'm Good (Blue)" (with Bebe Rexha)	Best Music Video	Nominated	
iHeartRadio Music Awards	2024	"Baby Don't Hurt Me" (with Anne-Marie & Coi Leray)	Dance Song of the Year	Nominated	
iHeartRadio Music Awards	2024	Himself	Dance Artist of the Year	Nominated	
iHeartRadio Music Awards	2026	Himself	Dance Artist of the Year	Won	
International Dance Music Awards	2007	"Love Don't Let Me Go"	Best Dance Music Video	Nominated	
International Dance Music Awards	2008	Himself	Best European DJ	Nominated	
International Dance Music Awards	2008	"Love Is Gone"	Best Breaks/Electro Dance Track	Won	
International Dance Music Awards	2008	"Love Is Gone"	Best House/Garage Dance Track	Won	
International Dance Music Awards	2009	"Delirious"	Best House/Garage Dance Track	Nominated	
International Dance Music Awards	2009	"Delirious"	Best Music Video	Nominated	
International Dance Music Awards	2009	Himself	Best Dance Solo Artist	Nominated	
International Dance Music Awards	2009	Himself	Best European DJ	Nominated	
International Dance Music Awards	2010	Himself	Best European DJ	Won	
International Dance Music Awards	2010	Himself	Best Producer	Won	
International Dance Music Awards	2010	Himself	Best Global DJ	Nominated	
International Dance Music Awards	2010	One Love	Best Artist Album	Won	
International Dance Music Awards	2010	"Sexy Bitch"	Best Pop Dance Track	Nominated	
International Dance Music Awards	2010	"Sexy Bitch"	Best Progressive/Tech House Dance Track	Nominated	
International Dance Music Awards	2010	"When Love Takes Over"	Best House/Garage Dance Track	Nominated	
International Dance Music Awards	2010	"When Love Takes Over"	Best Music Video	Nominated	
International Dance Music Awards	2010	"When Love Takes Over"	Best Pop Dance Track	Won	
International Dance Music Awards	2011	"Gettin' Over You"	Best Pop Dance Track	Won	
International Dance Music Awards	2011	"Gettin' Over You"	Best Music Video	Won	
International Dance Music Awards	2011	"Who's That Chick?"	Best R&B/Urban Dance Track	Nominated	
International Dance Music Awards	2011	"Commander"	Best R&B/Urban Dance Track	Nominated	
International Dance Music Awards	2011	"Club Can't Handle Me"	Best R&B/Urban Dance Track	Nominated	
International Dance Music Awards	2011	"Club Can't Handle Me"	Best Rap/Hip-Hop Dance Track	Nominated	
International Dance Music Awards	2011	"Memories"	Best Rap/Hip-Hop Dance Track	Nominated	
International Dance Music Awards	2011	Himself	Best European DJ	Nominated	
International Dance Music Awards	2011	Himself	Best Global DJ	Nominated	
International Dance Music Awards	2011	Himself	Best Dance Solo Artist	Nominated	
International Dance Music Awards	2011	Himself	Best Producer	Won	
International Dance Music Awards	2012	Himself	Best Producer	Won	
International Dance Music Awards	2012	Himself	Best Dance Solo Artist	Nominated	
International Dance Music Awards	2012	Himself	Best Global DJ	Nominated	
International Dance Music Awards	2012	Himself	Best European DJ	Nominated	
International Dance Music Awards	2012	"Where Them Girls At"	Best Rap/Hip-Hop Dance Track	Nominated	
International Dance Music Awards	2012	"Without You"	Best R&B/Urban Dance Track	Nominated	
International Dance Music Awards	2012	"Without You"	Best Commercial/Pop Dance Track	Nominated	
International Dance Music Awards	2013	Himself	Best European DJ	Nominated	
International Dance Music Awards	2013	Himself	Best Producer	Nominated	
International Dance Music Awards	2013	Himself	Best Global DJ	Nominated	
International Dance Music Awards	2014	Himself	Best Global DJ	Nominated	
International Dance Music Awards	2014	Himself	Best EDM/Pop DJ	Nominated	
International Dance Music Awards	2015	Himself	Best EDM/Pop DJ	Nominated	
International Dance Music Awards	2015	Himself	Best Artist (Solo)	Nominated	
International Dance Music Awards	2015	Himself	Best Global DJ	Nominated	
International Dance Music Awards	2015	Himself	Best Producer	Nominated	
International Dance Music Awards	2015	"Bad"	Best Electro/Progressive House Track	Nominated	
International Dance Music Awards	2016	"Hey Mama"	Best R&B/Urban Track	Nominated	
International Dance Music Awards	2016	"Hey Mama"	Best Rap/Hip Hop/Trap Dance Track	Won	
International Dance Music Awards	2016	Himself	Best European DJ	Nominated	
International Dance Music Awards	2016	Himself	Best EDM/Pop DJ	Nominated	
International Dance Music Awards	2016	Himself	Best Progressive House/Electro DJ	Nominated	
International Dance Music Awards	2016	Himself	Best Solo Artist	Nominated	
International Dance Music Awards	2016	Himself	Best Producer	Nominated	
International Dance Music Awards	2019	7	Best Pop/Electronic Album	Nominated	
Latin American Music Awards	2024	Himself	Best Crossover Artist	Nominated	
Latin American Music Awards	2024	"Vocation" (with Ozuna)	Collaboration Crossover of the Year	Nominated	
Los40 Music Awards	2010	David Guetta	Best International Act	Nominated	
Los40 Music Awards	2010	"Sexy Bitch" (featuring Akon)	Best International Song	Nominated	
Los40 Music Awards	2012	David Guetta	Best International Act	Nominated	
Los40 Music Awards	2012	Nothing But the Beat 2.0	Best International Album	Won	
Los40 Music Awards	2015	Listen	Best International Album	Nominated	
Los40 Music Awards	2018	"Flames" (with Sia)	Best International Video	Won	
Los40 Music Awards	2021	David Guetta	Best International Dance Act	Nominated	
Los40 Music Awards	2022	David Guetta	Best International Act	Nominated	
Los40 Music Awards	2022	David Guetta	Best International Dance Act	Won	
Los40 Music Awards	2022	"Don't You Worry" (featuring Black Eyed Peas and Shakira)	Best International Song	Nominated	
Los40 Music Awards	2022	"Don't You Worry" (featuring Black Eyed Peas and Shakira)	Best International Collaboration	Nominated	
Los40 Music Awards	2022	"Crazy What Love Can Do" (featuring Becky Hill and Ella Henderson)	Best International Collaboration	Won	
Los40 Music Awards	2022	"Crazy What Love Can Do" (featuring Becky Hill and Ella Henderson)	Best International Video	Nominated	
MTV Europe Music Awards	2002	David Guetta	Best French Act	Nominated	
MTV Europe Music Awards	2008	David Guetta	Best French Act	Nominated	
MTV Europe Music Awards	2009	David Guetta	Best French Act	Nominated	
MTV Europe Music Awards	2009	"When Love Takes Over" (featuring Kelly Rowland)	Best Song	Nominated	
MTV Europe Music Awards	2010	David Guetta	Best French Act	Nominated	
MTV Europe Music Awards	2011	David Guetta	Best French Act	Nominated	
MTV Europe Music Awards	2011	David Guetta	Best Male	Nominated	
MTV Europe Music Awards	2012	David Guetta	Best Electronic	Won	
MTV Europe Music Awards	2014	David Guetta	Best Electronic	Nominated	
MTV Europe Music Awards	2015	David Guetta	Best Electronic	Nominated	
MTV Europe Music Awards	2015	"Hey Mama" (featuring Nicki Minaj, Bebe Rexha and Afrojack)	Best Collaboration	Nominated	
MTV Europe Music Awards	2016	Himself	Best Electronic	Nominated	
MTV Europe Music Awards	2017	Himself	Best Electronic	Won	
MTV Europe Music Awards	2018	Himself	Best Electronic	Nominated	
MTV Europe Music Awards	2018	Himself	Best World Stage Performance	Nominated	
MTV Europe Music Awards	2021	Himself	Best Electronic	Won	
MTV Europe Music Awards	2022	Himself	Best Electronic	Won	
MTV Europe Music Awards	2022	"I'm Good (Blue)"	Best Collaboration	Won	
MTV Europe Music Awards	2023	Himself	Best Electronic	Won	
MTV Europe Music Awards	2023	"Baby Don't Hurt Me"	Best Collaboration	Nominated	
MTV Video Music Awards	2010	"Sexy Chick"	Best Dance Music Video	Nominated	
MTV Video Music Awards	2012	"Turn Me On"	Best Visual Effects	Nominated	
MTV Video Music Awards	2014	"One Voice"	Best Video with a Social Message	Nominated	
MTV Video Music Awards	2015	"Hey Mama"	Song of Summer	Nominated	
MTV Video Music Awards	2018	"Flames"	Best Dance	Nominated	
MTV Video Music Awards	2019	"Say My Name"	Best Dance	Nominated	
MTV Video Music Awards	2023	"I'm Good (Blue)"	Best Collaboration	Nominated	
MTV Video Music Awards Japan	2010	"When Love Takes Over"	Best Dance Video	Nominated	
MTV Video Music Awards Japan	2012	"Where Them Girls At"	Best Dance Video	Nominated	
MTV Video Music Awards Japan	2012	"Where Them Girls At"	Best Male Video	Nominated	
MVPA Awards	2013	"She Wolf (Falling to Pieces)" (with Sia)	Best Electronic Video	Won	
MVPA Awards	2013	"She Wolf (Falling to Pieces)" (with Sia)	Best Computer Effects	Nominated	
MVPA Awards	2013	"Just One Last Time" (with Taped Rai)	Best Cinematography	Nominated	
MuchMusic Video Awards	2011	"Who's That Chick?" (with Rihanna)	International Video of the Year	Nominated	
MuchMusic Video Awards	2012	"Turn Me On" (with Nicki Minaj)	International Video of the Year	Nominated	
Nickelodeon Kids' Choice Awards	2019	Himself	Favorite Global Music Star	Nominated	
Nickelodeon Kids' Choice Awards	2021	Himself	Favorite Global Music Star	Nominated	
Nickelodeon Kids' Choice Awards	2023	"Don't You Worry" (with Black Eyed Peas & Shakira)	Favorite Music Collaboration	Nominated	
NRJ Music Awards	2007	Himself	DJ of the Year	Nominated	
NRJ Music Awards	2008	Himself	Franch Male Artist of the Year	Nominated	
NRJ Music Awards	2008	Pop Life	Franch Album of the Year	Nominated	
NRJ Music Awards	2009	Himself	Franch Male Artist of the Year	Nominated	
NRJ Music Awards	2010	Himself	Franch Male Artist of the Year	Nominated	
NRJ Music Awards	2010	"When Love Takes Over" (with Kelly Rowland)	International Song of the Year	Nominated	
NRJ Music Awards	2010	One Love	International Album of the Year	Won	
NRJ Music Awards	2011	Himself	Franch Male Artist of the Year	Nominated	
NRJ Music Awards	2011	Himself	NRJ Award of Honor	Won	
NRJ Music Awards	2011	"Club Can't Handle Me" (with Flo Rida)	Song of the Year	Won	
NRJ Music Awards	2012	Himself	Franch Male Artist of the Year	Nominated	
NRJ Music Awards	2012	David Guetta & Usher	International Duo or Group of the Year	Nominated	
NRJ Music Awards	2013	Himself	Franch Male Artist of the Year	Nominated	
NRJ Music Awards	2014	Himself	Franch Male Artist of the Year	Nominated	
NRJ Music Awards	2014	"Lovers on the Sun"	International Duo or Group of the Year	Nominated	
NRJ Music Awards	2015	Himself	Best French DJ	Won	
NRJ Music Awards	2016	Himself	Best French DJ	Won	
NRJ Music Awards	2016	Himself	Best Live Performance	Nominated	
NRJ Music Awards	2016	"This One's for You" (with Zara Larsson)	Best Single Dance/Electro	Nominated	
NRJ Music Awards	2017	Himself	DJ of the Year	Nominated	
NRJ Music Awards	2018	Himself & Sia	International Duo or Group of the Year	Nominated	
NRJ Music Awards	2018	Himself	DJ of the Year	Nominated	
NRJ Music Awards	2019	Himself	DJ of the Year	Nominated	
NRJ Music Awards	2020	Himself	DJ of the Year	Nominated	
NRJ Music Awards	2020	"Let’s Love" (with Sia)	International Collaboration of the Year	Nominated	
NRJ Music Awards	2021	Himself	DJ of the Year	Nominated	
NRJ Music Awards	2022	Himself	French Male Artist of the Year	Nominated	
NRJ Music Awards	2022	Himself	DJ of the Year	Won	
NRJ Music Awards	2022	"Don't You Worry" (with Black Eyed Peas and Shakira)	International Collaboration of the Year	Nominated	
NRJ Music Awards	2022	"Don't You Worry" (with Black Eyed Peas and Shakira)	International Video of the Year	Nominated	
NRJ Music Awards	2022	"Don't You Worry" (with Black Eyed Peas and Shakira)	International Song of the Year	Nominated	
NRJ Music Awards	2022	"I'm Good (Blue)" (with Bebe Rexha)	International Song of the Year	Nominated	
NRJ Music Awards	2022	"I'm Good (Blue)" (with Bebe Rexha)	Reprise or Adaptation Song of the Year	Nominated	
NRJ Music Awards	2023	Himself	French Male Artist of the Year	Nominated	
NRJ Music Awards	2023	Himself	DJ of the Year	Won	
NRJ Music Awards	2023	"Baby Don't Hurt Me"	Reprise or Adaptation Song of the Year	Nominated	
NRJ Music Awards	2025	"Golden" (David Guetta REM/X)	Social Hit	Won	
NRJ Music Awards	2025	Himself	DJ of the Year	Won	
NRJ Music Awards	2026	"Save Me Tonight" (with J.LO)	International Collaboration of the Year	Pending	
NRJ Music Awards	2026	Himself	DJ of the Year	Pending	
NRJ Music Awards	2026	Himself	Francophone Concert of the Year	Pending	
RTHK International Pop Poll Awards	2025	"Golden" (David Guetta REM/X)	Top Ten International Gold Songs	Won	
Teen Choice Awards	2013	Himself	Choice Music: EDM Artist	Won	
Teen Choice Awards	2015	"Hey Mama" (with Nicki Minaj Bebe Rexha & Afrojack)	Choice Music: Collaboration	Nominated	
Teen Choice Awards	2017	Himself	Choice Music: Electronic/Dance Artist	Nominated	
Teen Choice Awards	2017	"2U" (with Justin Bieber)	Choice Music: Electronic/Dance Song	Nominated	
UK Music Video Awards	2012	"Titanium"	Best Dance Video	Nominated	
WDM Radio Awards	2017	"This One's for You" (with Zara Larsson)	Best Global Track	Nominated	
WDM Radio Awards	2017	David Guetta	Best DJ	Nominated	
WDM Radio Awards	2017	David Guetta	Best Electro House DJ	Won	
WDM Radio Awards	2018	David Guetta	King of Social Media	Nominated	
WDM Radio Awards	2018	"2U" (with Justin Bieber)	Best Bass Track	Nominated	
WDM Radio Awards	2018	"Dirty Sexy Money" (with Afrojack, Charli XCX and French Montana)	Best Trending Track	Nominated	
World Music Awards	2010	Himself	Best Producer	Won	
World Music Awards	2010	Himself	Best DJ	Nominated	
World Music Awards	2010	Himself	Best French Artist	Won	
World Music Awards	2010	"When Love Takes Over" (with Kelly Rowland)	Best Single	Nominated	
World Music Awards	2010	"Sexy Chick" (with Akon)	Best Single	Nominated	

== Miscellaneous ==
=== DJ Magazine top 100 DJs ===
Year	Position	Notes	Ref.
2005	39	New Entry	
2006	31	Up 8	
2007	10	Up 21	
2008	5	Up 5	
2009	3	Up 2	
2010	2	Up 1	
2011	1	Up 1	
2012	4	Down 3	
2013	5	Down 1	
2014	7	Down 2	
2015	6	Up 1	
2016	6	No Change	
2017	7	Down 1	
2018	5	Up 2	
2019	3	Up 2	
2020	1	Up 2	
2021	1	No Change	
2022	2	Down 1	
2023	1	Up 1	
2024	2	Down 1	
2025	1	Up 1	

=== DJ Awards ===
Year	Nominee / work	Award	Result	Ref.
2006	David Guetta	Best House DJ	Nominated	
2007	David Guetta	Best International DJ	Won	
2008	David Guetta	Best International DJ	Nominated	
2008	David Guetta	Best House DJ	Won	
2009	David Guetta	Best International DJ	Nominated	
2009	David Guetta	Best House DJ	Won	
2010	David Guetta	Best International DJ	Nominated	
2010	David Guetta	Best House DJ	Nominated	
2011	David Guetta	Best International DJ	Nominated	
2011	David Guetta	Best House DJ	Nominated	
2012	David Guetta	Best International DJ	Nominated	
2012	David Guetta	Best Electro House	Nominated	
2013	David Guetta	Best International DJ	Nominated	
2013	David Guetta	Best Electro House	Nominated	
2014	David Guetta	Best International DJ	Nominated	
2014	David Guetta	Best Electro House	Nominated	
2015	David Guetta	Best International DJ	Nominated	
2016	David Guetta	Best International DJ	Nominated	
2016	David Guetta	Best Big Room House DJ	Nominated	
2017	David Guetta	Best International DJ	Nominated	
2017	David Guetta	Best Big Room House DJ	Nominated	
2018	David Guetta	Best International DJ	Nominated	

=== YouTube Creator Awards ===
- David Guetta
  (24 million subscribers - March 2022)
