= Cozi (given name) =

Cozi is a feminine given name. Notable people with the name include:

- Cozi Zuehlsdorff (born 1998), American actress
- Cozi Costi, British singer
