= Cossie =

Cossie or Cossies may refer to:

- Cossie, term for swimsuit
- Cossie, a member of TSD (band)
- Cossies, an alternative name for Liverpool pop band 28 Costumes
- Cosworth
