= Tomorrow Can Wait =

Single by David Guetta and Chris Willis vs. Tocadisco

from the album Pop Life
- Released: 7 July 2008
- Recorded: 2007
- Genre: Electro house
- Length: 3:10 (Radio Edit)
- Label: Ultra Records
- Songwriters: David Guetta, Joachim Garraud, Karen Poole, Tocadisco
- Producers: David Guetta, Joachim Garraud, Tocadisco

David Guetta singles chronology
"Delirious" (2008)	"Tomorrow Can Wait" (2008)	"Everytime We Touch" (2009)

Chris Willis singles chronology
"Give It All You Got" (2007)	"Tomorrow Can Wait" (2008)	"Everytime We Touch" (2009)

Music video
- "Tomorrow Can Wait" on YouTube

"Tomorrow Can Wait" is an electro house song performed by French DJ David Guetta, American singer Chris Willis and German DJ Tocadisco from Guetta's third studio album, Pop Life. The song was released as the album's fifth single on 7 July 2008. A music video was first released onto YouTube on 15 August 2008 at a total length of three minutes and forty-seven seconds.

== Track listing ==
From Discogs.

- French CD single
1. "Tomorrow Can Wait" (radio edit) – 3:10
2. "Tomorrow Can Wait" (club mix) – 6:44
- European CD single
1. "Tomorrow Can Wait" (radio edit) – 3:10
2. "Tomorrow Can Wait" (Tocadisco Evil Mix) – 6:07
3. "Tomorrow Can Wait" (Arias Seat Ibiza Remix) – 7:21
4. "Tomorrow Can Wait" (Sharam Remix DG Edit) – 6:21
5. "Tomorrow Can Wait" (club mix) – 6:44

== Charts ==
=== Weekly charts ===
Weekly chart performance for "Tomorrow Can Wait"
Chart (2008–2014)	Peak Position
Austria (Ö3 Austria Top 40)	47
Belgium (Ultratop 50 Flanders)	44
Belgium (Ultratop 50 Wallonia)	19
CIS Airplay (TopHit)	19
France (SNEP)	7
Germany (GfK)	56
Hungary (Dance Top 40)	6
Hungary (Editors' Choice Top 40)	29
Italy (Musica e Dischi)	31
Netherlands (Single Top 100)	35
Russia Airplay (TopHit)	21
Slovenia (SloTop50)	18
Switzerland (Schweizer Hitparade)	43

=== Year-end charts ===
Year-end chart performance for "Tomorrow Can Wait"
Chart (2008)	Position
CIS (TopHit)	79
France (SNEP)	58
Hungary (Dance Top 40)	23
Russia Airplay (TopHit)	85

== Release history ==
Region	Date	Format	Label
France	7 July 2008	Digital download, CD single	Ultra Records
United States	9 September 2008	Digital download	Ultra Records
