= Shakey Grounds =

- Directed by: Michael Garcia
- Written by: Trace Slobotkin
- Produced by: Jonny Danks
- Starring: Eric Nelsen; Eric Roberts; Mackenzie Ziegler; Ella Cannon; Jonny Danks; Moses Jones; Kelly Thiebaud
- Cinematography: Matthew Boyd
- Music by: Bernie Garcia
- Production companies: Gravitas Ventures; Dank Productions
- Release date: May 23, 2025
- Running time: 82 minutes
- Country: United States
- Language: English

Shakey Grounds is a 2025 drama film directed by Michael Garcia and written by Trace Slobotkin. It stars Eric Nelsen as a gifted yet troubled musician who grapples with his past and fractured relationships. Jonny Danks Eric Roberts, Mackenzie Ziegler, Moses Jones, and Kelly Thiebaud also star. It was released on May 23, 2025.

== Premise ==
Aspiring musician Travis (Nelsen) copes with the death of his best friend and finds purpose when a disgraced record label executive Nick (Danks) unexpectedly visits his hometown.

== Cast ==
- Eric Nelsen as Travis Dent
- Eric Roberts as Lou Bernstein
- Mackenzie Ziegler as Lisa
- Ella Cannon as Mel Butler
- Jonny Danks as Nick
- Moses Jones as Jimmy
- Kelly Thiebaud as Carrie
- Matthew Gumley as Darby
- David Lautman as Brad

== Production ==
Shakey Grounds was filmed in Rogers, Bentonville, Fayetteville, and Prairie Grove Arkansas in 2023.

== See also ==
- List of films about bands
