= Separatist (band) =

- Origin: Hobart Tasmania, Australia
- Genres: Christian metal, death metal, deathcore, technical death metal, extreme metal
- Years active: 2003-2011, 2014-present
- Labels: Independent, Reverb Productions, Subliminal Groove Records
- Members: Sam "Disho" Dishington
- Past members: Luke Ranson; Matt Carter; James Brady; Dave Gilbert; Mitch Golding
- Website: Separatist on Facebook

Separatist was a technical death metal band that formed in 2003 in Australia and is now a one-man project.

== History ==
Separatist began in 2003 in Hobart, Tasmania, Australia as a full band consisting of Sam "Disho" Dishington on vocals, James Brady and Dave Gilbert on guitars, Luke Ranson on bass and Matt Carter on drums. The band released a full-length album in 2008, titled The Motionless Apocalypse. In April 2011, the band split up. Dave Gilbert left the band, and James Brady was later removed, following personal disagreements with Disho. The band subsequently lost what would have been their second album to a computer malfunction and disbanded. Disho left the band and the band broke up shortly afterwards.

In 2014, Disho took up the mantle of Separatist but as a solo project, with him recording all vocals, bass, and guitar and programming all the drums. After Disho took control of the project, he released a double album, under the titles Closure and Motionless. The albums' profits were donated to the A21 Campaign, a campaign to support the war against human trafficking. The songs were all original compositions from their original second album. Disho is currently working on a band called Departe, with a former member of the band, which is now signed to Season of Mist.

== Members ==
Current

- Sam "Disho" Dishington - Vocals (2003-2011, 2014-present), guitar, bass, programming (2014-present)

Former

- James Brady - Guitars (2003-2011)
- Dave Gilbert - Guitars (2003-2011)
- Mitch Golding - Guitars (2007-2011)
- Luke Ranson - Bass (2003-2011)
- Matt Carter - Drums (2003-2011)

== Discography ==
Studio albums

- The Motionless Apocalypse (2008; Reverb Productions)
- Closure (2014; Independent)
- Motionless (2014; Independent)

Compilation appearances

- Christian Deathcore Volume 3 (2014; Christian Deathcore)
- Mother of Deathcore Vol. 3 (2014; Mother of Deathcore)
- Christian Deathcore Volume 4 (2015; Christian Deathcore)
