= Kelly Thiebaud =

American actress (born 1982)

- Born: Kelly Hager Thiebaud; August 28, 1982 (age 43); El Campo, Texas, U.S.
- Occupation: Actress
- Years active: 2002–present
- Height: 5 ft 9 in (1.75 m)

Kelly Hager Thiebaud (born on August 28, 1982) is an American actress and model best known for her portrayal of Dr. Britt Westbourne on ABC daytime soap opera, General Hospital, for which she won the Daytime Emmy Award for Outstanding Supporting Actress in a Drama Series in 2022.

== Early life and career ==
Thiebaud was born in El Campo, Texas and made her screen debut in 2002, in the independent film Journey of Redemption. Apart from her acting work, she also modeled and appeared in four music videos for French disc jockey David Guetta between 2007 and 2008 (Love is Gone, Baby When The Light, Delirious). On television, she guest-starred in Chuck, Castle, Criminal Minds, and had the recurring role on the ABC Family series The Secret Life of the American Teenager from 2010 to 2011 and NBC soap opera Days of Our Lives in 2011. In 2011, Thiebaud appeared in the horror film Hostel: Part III. In 2013, She appeared in the Christian drama film Grace Unplugged, playing according to Variety a "superstar pop tart" who uses her body as her path to success.

In 2012, Thiebaud was cast as Dr. Britt Westbourne in the ABC daytime soap opera, General Hospital. In February 2013, Soap Opera Digest confirmed that the actress had been upgraded to a contract status. On November 10, 2014, it was announced that Thiebaud had been placed on recurring status following the conclusion of her two-year contract, in order to pursue other acting opportunities. She reprised the role on several occasions, between 2015 and 2018, for limited-run guest appearances. In March 2020, Thiebaud returned for another guest stint; by September of the same year, she returned to the role once more. In August 2022, it was announced that she will leave the role again. Thiebaud's performance has been met with critical acclaim, winning the Daytime Emmy Award for Outstanding Supporting Actress in a Drama Series in 2022. The following year, Thiebaud received her second Daytime Emmy Award nomination.

Thiebaud played the leading roles in the Lifetime television films The Surrogate (2018) and A Mother on the Edge (2019). In 2020, Thiebaud was cast in the ABC drama series Station 19 playing the recurring role as Eva Vasquez. She returned to series in 2022. In 2025, she appeared as Layla Carreri in the audio drama Montecito, beginning April 22. That same year, it was announced Thiebaud would return to General Hospital, beginning in July.

== Personal life ==
Thiebaud became engaged to her former General Hospital co-star Bryan Craig in June 2015. They had been together since 2013. As of 2016, they have broken up.

== Filmography ==
=== Film ===
Year	Title	Role	Notes
2002	Journey of Redemption	Lindsey	
2011	Hostel: Part III	Amy	
2013	Grace Unplugged	Renae Taylor	
2013	Healing the Stupid	Carla	
2013	Raze	Vanessa	
2017	Abduction of Angie	Miranda	
2018	Every 21 Seconds	Mary Beth Sweeney	
2018	The Surrogate	Danielle	
2022	Creator	Laura	Short film
2024	Shakey Grounds	Carrie	

=== Television ===
Year	Title	Role	Notes
2010	Chuck	Lady Agent	Episode: "Chuck Versus the Final Exam"
2010	Chuck	Evelyn Shaw	Episode: "Chuck Versus the American Hero"
2011	Castle	Chloe Graves/Greta Morgan	Episode: "Nikki Heat"
2011	The Secret Life of the American Teenager	Karlee Carmichael	4 episodes
2011	Days of Our Lives	Alicia	2 episodes
2012	Criminal Minds	Rebecca	Episode: "A Family Affair"
2012–2025	General Hospital	Dr. Britt Westbourne	2012–14; 2021–23 2025– (Contract role); 2015; 2017–18; 2020–21 (guest star)
2017	Love at First Glance	Carey	Television film
2019	A Mother on the Edge	Blair Ayken	Television film
2020	Days of Our Lives	Zoey Burge #1	Recurring role
2020—2022	Station 19	Eva Vasquez	Recurring role, 10 episodes
2023	Magnum P.I.	Sara Macy	Episode: "The Passenger"

== Awards and nominations ==
Year	Award	Category	Work	Result	Ref
2018	Cinema World Fest Awards	Best Acting	Every 21 Seconds	Won	
2018	Festigious International Film Festival	Best Ensemble Cast	Every 21 Seconds	Won	
2018	Festigious International Film Festival	Best Actress	Every 21 Seconds	Nominated	
2022	Daytime Emmy Award	Outstanding Supporting Actress in a Drama Series	General Hospital	Won	
2023	Daytime Emmy Award	Outstanding Supporting Actress in a Drama Series	General Hospital	Nominated	
