= TSD (group) =

English pop music group

- Origin: England
- Genres: Pop, Eurodance
- Years active: 1995–1996
- Label: Avex Group
- Past members: Claire Richards; Cozi Costi; Bonnie Rachanski

TSD were an English pop group who had a UK No. 69 hit with "Heart and Soul", which also peaked at No. 258 in Australia, and a UK No. 64 hit with "Baby I Love You", a cover of the Ronettes song. One of its members, Claire Richards, became a member of Steps.

The name "TSD" means very little; it was formed by taking three random letters out of a Scrabble bag. However, Newsround presenter Chris Rogers suggested it should stand for "Three Sexy Dames".
