= Baby When the Light =

2007 single by David Guetta

"Baby When The Light"

Single by David Guetta and Steve Angello featuring Cozi

from the album Pop Life
- Released: 10 November 2007
- Recorded: 2007
- Genre: Electroclash; pop rock; French house
- Length: 3:27 (album version); 3:10 (radio mix)
- Label: EMI France
- Songwriters: David Guetta; Joachim Garraud; Steve Angello; Cathy Dennis
- Producers: David Guetta; Joachim Garraud; Steve Angello

David Guetta singles chronology
"Love Is Gone" (2007)	"Baby When The Light" (2007)	"Delirious" (2008)

"Baby When the Light" is a song by French DJ David Guetta. It was released on 10 November 2007 as the third single from his third studio album, Pop Life. The song features vocals by English singer Cozi Costi. It was written by Guetta, Joachim Garruad, Steve Angello, and Cathy Dennis, and produced by the former three.

== Music video ==
The "Baby When the Light" music video is about a young girl, played by model Kelly Thiebaud, who goes to the beach and dreams about befriending a handsome surfer. While walking her dog, she decides to rest on the beach where she starts dreaming. As the video proceeds, strange things start to happen, girls in bikinis start dancing, an old woman starts rubbing herself with lotion as she watches the young surfer via binoculars. Close to the end of the video, the woman is finally approached by the surfer after exchanging smiles throughout the video. He then invites her to surf with him. The video ends as the girl wakes up from her dream, and finds no one around her but her dog. The video was filmed on a beach near Los Angeles, California.

== Track listings ==
- UK CD single
1. "Baby When the Light" (David Guetta & Fred Rister radio edit) – 3:15
2. "Baby When the Light" (Laidback Luke remix) – 7:09
3. "Baby When the Light" (Dirty South remix) – 6:34
4. "Baby When the Light" (Joe T. Vanelli remix) – 6:45
- French CD single
1. "Baby When the Light" (album version) – 3:27
2. "Baby When the Light" (David Guetta & Fred Rister radio edit) – 3:24
3. "Baby When the Light" (original extended mix) – 5:58
4. "Baby When the Light" (video) – 3:27
5. "Baby When the Light" (making of the video) – 3:11
- German CD single
1. "Baby When the Light" (David Guetta & Fred Rister remix) – 8:17
2. "Baby When the Light" (Laidback Luke remix) – 7:09
3. "Baby When the Light" (Dirty South remix) – 6:34
4. "Baby When the Light" (Joe T. Vanelli remix) – 6:45
5. "Baby When the Light" (original extended mix) – 5:58
6. "Baby When the Light" (David Guetta & Fred Rister radio edit) – 3:15
7. "Baby When the Light" (album version) – 3:27

== Charts and certifications ==
=== Weekly charts ===
Chart (2007–2008)	Peak position
Austria (Ö3 Austria Top 40)	62
Belgium (Ultratop 50 Flanders)	15
Belgium (Ultratop 50 Wallonia)	5
CIS Airplay (TopHit)	2
Czech Republic Airplay (ČNS IFPI)	23
Europe (Eurochart Hot 100)	19
Euro Digital Tracks (Billboard)	11
France (SNEP)	6
Germany (GfK)	59
Hungary (Dance Top 40)	3
Hungary (Rádiós Top 40)	40
Hungary (Single Top 40)	6
Italy (FIMI)	22
Netherlands (Dutch Top 40)	15
Netherlands (Single Top 100)	30
Russia Airplay (TopHit)	2
Sweden (Sverigetopplistan)	35
Switzerland (Schweizer Hitparade)	25
UK Singles (Official Charts)	50
US Dance Airplay (Billboard)	4

=== Year-end charts ===
Chart (2007)	Position
Belgium (Ultratop 50 Wallonia)	53
CIS (TopHit)	90
France (SNEP)	53
Hungary (Dance Top 40)	56
Russia Airplay (TopHit)	90
Switzerland (Schweizer Hitparade)	100

Chart (2008)	Position
Belgium (Ultratop 50 Wallonia)	28
CIS (TopHit)	40
Europe (Eurochart Hot 100)	92
Hungary (Dance Top 40)	28
Russia Airplay (TopHit)	25
Switzerland (Schweizer Hitparade)	95

=== Decade-end charts ===
Decade-end chart performance for "Baby When the Light"
Chart (2000–2009)	Position
CIS Airplay (TopHit)	32
Russia Airplay (TopHit)	29

=== Certifications ===
Region	Certification	Certified units/sales
France (SNEP)	Gold	200,000^{*}
^{*} Sales figures based on certification alone.
