= Pop Life (David Guetta album) =

Studio album by David Guetta
- Released: 18 June 2007
- Recorded: 2006–2007
- Genre: Eurodance
- Length: 48:40 (regular edition); 59:37 (limited edition)
- Labels: Virgin; Perfecto; Ultra
- Producers: David Guetta; Joachim Garraud; Steve Angello; Frédéric Riesterer; Sebastian Ingrosso; Sven Kirschner; Tocadisco

David Guetta chronology
Guetta Blaster (2004)	Pop Life (2007)	One Love (2009)

Singles from Pop Life
- 1. "Love Don't Let Me Go (Walking Away)" Released: 14 August 2006; 2. "Love Is Gone" Released: 3 August 2007; 3. "Baby When the Light" Released: 10 November 2007; 4. "Delirious" Released: 31 January 2008; 5. "Tomorrow Can Wait" Released: 7 July 2008; 6. "Everytime We Touch" Released: 16 January 2009

Professional ratings
Review scores
Source	Rating
About.com	5/5 stars
AllMusic	3.5/5 stars
The Guardian	2/5 stars

Pop Life is the third studio album released by French DJ and record producer David Guetta. It was released in 2007 and produced with Joachim Garraud. Longtime collaborator Chris Willis is the main vocalist; guest vocals are provided by JD Davis, Tara McDonald, Cozi Costi, Juliet Richardson and Thailand. The album has sold 530,000 copies worldwide and 18,000 copies in the United States.

The first single to be released from Pop Life was "Love Is Gone", which became a top 10 hit on the UK Singles Chart, peaking at number 9. The remix by Fred Rister (Frédéric Riesterer) and Joachim Garraud received plays in dance clubs across the world. The second single was "Baby When the Light", which featured vocals by Cozi and addition production by Steve Angello. Subsequent singles include "Delirious", featuring Tara McDonald on vocals, "Tomorrow Can Wait" and "Everytime We Touch".

== Track listing ==
No.	Title	Writer(s)	Producer(s)	Length
1.	"Baby When the Light" (featuring Cozi Costi)	Joachim Garraud; David Guetta; Steve Angello; Cathy Dennis	Guetta; Garraud; Angello	3:27
2.	"Love Is Gone" (featuring Chris Willis)	Garraud; Guetta; Frédéric Riesterer; Chris Willis	Guetta; Garraud; Riesterer	3:08
3.	"Everytime We Touch" (featuring Chris Willis, Steve Angello and Sebastian Ingrosso)	Garraud; Guetta; Angello; Sebastian Ingrosso; Willis	Guetta; Garraud; Angello; Ingrosso	3:40
4.	"Delirious" (featuring Tara McDonald)	Garraud; Guetta; Tara McDonald; Carl Ryden	Guetta; Garraud; Sven Kirschner (co.)	4:31
5.	"Tomorrow Can Wait" (featuring Chris Willis vs. Tocadisco)	Garraud; Guetta; Karen Poole; Tocadisco	Guetta; Garraud; Tocadisco	3:33
6.	"Winner of the Game" (featuring JD Davis)	Garraud; Guetta; Xavier Clayton; David Henrard	Guetta; Garraud; Hal Ritson (vocal)	3:02
7.	"Do Something Love" (featuring Juliet)	Garraud; Guetta; Ben Chapman; Jim Irvin; Juliet Richardson	Guetta; Garraud	4:10
8.	"You're Not Alone" (featuring Tara McDonald)	Garraud; Guetta; McDonald; Ryden	Guetta; Garraud	3:54
9.	"Never Take Away My Freedom" (featuring Chris Willis)	Garraud; Guetta; Willis	Guetta; Garraud	4:09
10.	"This Is Not a Love Song" (featuring JD Davis)	Garraud; Guetta; Martin Atkins; Keith Levene; John Lydon	Guetta; Garraud	3:46
11.	"Always" (featuring JD Davis)	Garraud; Guetta; Clayton; Henrard	Guetta; Garraud; Ritson (vocal)	4:00
12.	"Joan of Arc" (featuring Thailand)	Garraud; Guetta; Marc Linquist; Alexander Perls	Guetta; Garraud	4:01
13.	"Love Is Gone" (Fred Rister & Joachim Garraud Radio Edit; with Chris Willis)	Garraud; Guetta; Riesterer; Willis	Guetta; Rister (and remix; Garraud (and remix)	3:22
14.	"Baby When the Light" (David Guetta & Fred Rister Radio Edit Remix; featuring Cozi)	Garraud; Guetta; Angello; Dennis	Guetta (and remix); Garraud; Angello; Reisterer(remix)	3:24
Total length:				52:04

British and American bonus track
No.	Title	Writer(s)	Producer(s)	Length
15.	"Love Don't Let Me Go (Walking Away)" (David Guetta with The Egg featuring Chris Willis)	Guetta; Garraud; Willis; Idris Rahman; Jean-Charles Carre; Jeremy Bewley; Maff Scott; Ned Scott; Sophie Barker	Graham Barton; Matthew White	3:15
Total length:				59:37

French limited edition bonus tracks
No.	Title	Writer(s)	Producer(s)	Length
15.	"Don't Be Afraid" (featuring Chris Willis)	Guetta; Garraud; Willis	Guetta; Garraud	3:16
16.	"Take Me Away" (featuring Chris Willis)	Guetta; Garraud; Willis	Guetta; Garraud; Riston (vocal)	4:25
17.	"Love Don't Let Me Go (Walking Away)" (David Guetta with The Egg featuring Chris Willis)	Guetta; Garraud; Willis; Idris Rahman; Jean-Charles Carre; Jeremy Bewley; Maff Scott; Ned Scott; Sophie Barker	Graham Barton; Matthew White	3:15
Total length:				59:37

Digital edition bonus tracks
No.	Title	Writer(s)	Producer(s)	Length
14.	"Obsession" (featuring JD Davis and Miss B)	Guetta; Garraud	Guetta; Garraud	3:06
15.	"Don't Be Afraid" (featuring Chris Willis)	Guetta; Garraud; Willis	Guetta; Garraud	3:16
Total length:				59:37

French limited edition bonus DVD
No.	Title	Length
1.	"The Making of Poplife"	18:30
Total length:		18:30

European limited edition Opendisc content
No.	Title	Writer(s)	Producer(s)	Length
1.	"Rock the Disco"	Garraud; Guetta	Guetta; Garraud; Ritson	3:58
2.	"Love Is Gone" (Fuzzy Hair Dub)	Garraud; Guetta; Riesterer	Guetta; Garraud; Riesterer	5:47
3.	"Baby When the Light" (Joe T Vanelli Dub)	Garraud; Guetta; Angello; Dennis	Guetta; Garraud; Angello	9:30
4.	"Poplife Medley"	Garraud; Guetta	Guetta; Garraud	2:50
5.	"David Guetta Interview"			5:10
6.	"Pop Life Album Mix"			60:54
7.	"Love Is Gone" (U-Myx Version)			3:08

Pop Life – Ultimate edition: Disc 2
No.	Title	Length
1.	"Love Is Gone" (Amo & Navas Remix)
2.	"Love Is Gone" (Eddie Thoneick's Liberte Edit Mix)
3.	"Love Is Gone" (Fred Rister & Joachim Garraud Remix)
4.	"Love Is Gone" (Fuzzy Hair Remix)
5.	"Baby When the Light" (Dirty South Remix)
6.	"Baby When the Light" (Fred Rister & David Guetta Remix)
7.	"Baby When the Light" (Joe T. Vannelli Remix)
8.	"Baby When the Light" (Laidback Luke Remix)
9.	"Joan of Arc" (Crookers Pimp My Ark Mix)

Pop Life – Ultimate edition: Disc 3
No.	Title	Length
1.	"Delirious" (Laidback Luke Remix)
2.	"Delirious" (Arno Cost & Norman Doray Remix)
3.	"Delirious" (Fred Rister Remix)
4.	"Delirious" (Morefield & Bates Remix)
5.	"Tomorrow Can Wait" (Sharam's Celtics Vox Remix)
6.	"Tomorrow Can Wait" (Arias Remix)
7.	"Tomorrow Can Wait" (Tocadisco Evil Mix)
8.	"Everytime We Touch" (Inpetto Remix)
9.	"Everytime We Touch" (David Tort Remix)
10.	"Everytime We Touch" (Robbie Rivera Remix)

Pop Life – Ultimate edition: bonus 12" vinyl
No.	Title	Length
1.	"Everytime We Touch" (Inpetto Remix)
2.	"Everytime We Touch" (David Tort Remix)
3.	"Everytime We Touch" (Robbie Rivera Remix)
4.	"Everytime We Touch" (Extended Remix)

Pop Life – Ultimate edition: bonus DVD
No.	Title	Length
1.	"Love Is Gone" (video)
2.	"Baby When the Light" (video)
3.	"Delirious" (video)
4.	"Tomorrow Can Wait" (video)

== Chart performance ==
=== Weekly charts ===
Chart (2007)	Peak position
Austrian Albums (Ö3 Austria)	31
Belgian Albums (Ultratop Flanders)	83
Belgian Albums (Ultratop Wallonia)	4
French Albums (SNEP)	2
Swiss Albums (Schweizer Hitparade)	8
UK Albums (Official Charts)	44

=== Year-end charts ===
Chart (2007)	Position
Belgian Albums (Ultratop Wallonia)	23
Swiss Albums (Schweizer Hitparade)	37

== Certifications and sales ==
Region	Certification	Certified units/sales
Belgium (BRMA)	Gold	15,000^{*}
France (SNEP)	Platinum	200,000^{*}
Russia (NFPF)	Platinum	20,000^{*}
Switzerland (IFPI Switzerland)	Platinum	30,000^{^}
United States	—	16,000
Summaries
Worldwide	—	530,000
^{*} Sales figures based on certification alone.^{^} Shipments figures based on certification alone.
