= Everytime We Touch (David Guetta song) =

Single by David Guetta and Chris Willis with Steve Angello and Sebastian Ingrosso

from the album Pop Life
- Released: 16 January 2009
- Recorded: 2007
- Genre: Electro house
- Length: 3:40
- Label: Virgin
- Songwriters: David Guetta; Chris Willis; Steve Angello; Sebastian Ingrosso
- Producers: David Guetta; Steve Angello; Sebastian Ingrosso

David Guetta singles chronology
"Tomorrow Can Wait" (2008)	"Everytime We Touch" (2009)	"When Love Takes Over" (2009)

Chris Willis singles chronology
"Tomorrow Can Wait" (2008)	"Everytime We Touch" (2009)	"Gettin' Over You" (2010)

Music video
- "Everytime We Touch" on YouTube

"Everytime We Touch" is a song performed by French DJ David Guetta, American singer Chris Willis and Swedish House Mafia members and DJs Steve Angello and Sebastian Ingrosso from Guetta's third studio album, Pop Life (2007). The song was released as the album's sixth and final single on 16 January 2009.

Guetta's proclaimed favourite song from the album was written with long-term collaborator Willis, and co-produced with Swedish House Mafia members Angello and Ingrosso. The track was serviced to Australian radio on 23 February 2009.

== Track listing ==
- German CD single
1. "Everytime We Touch" (David Tort Remix) – 8:34
2. "Everytime We Touch" (Inpetto Remix) – 7:51
3. "Everytime We Touch" (Robbie Rivera Remix) – 9:04
4. "Everytime We Touch" (extended mix) – 7:58
5. "Everytime We Touch" (radio edit) – 3:15

== Charts ==
Chart performance for "Everytime We Touch"
Chart (2009)	Peak position
Austria (Ö3 Austria Top 40)	47
Belgium (Ultratip Bubbling Under Flanders)	12
Belgium (Ultratip Bubbling Under Wallonia)	3
France (SNEP)	46
Hungary (Dance Top 40)	35
Russia Airplay (TopHit)	91
Scottish Singles Sales (Official Charts)	88
UK Singles (Official Charts)	68
UK Dance (Official Charts)	2
