= Subliminal Groove Records =

Canadian record label

- Founded: 2012
- Founder: Justin Lee
- Genre: Varieties of metal
- Country of origin: Canada
- Location: Ontario, Canada
- Official website: www.subliminalgrooverecords.com

Subliminal Groove Records is an independent record label focused on niche extreme metal bands. The label was founded in Montreal, Quebec, Canada in 2012 by Justin Lee and has developed a reputation for signing progressive and underground artists. It is most active in online distribution and social media, while expansions of physical presence are planned.

== History ==
Subliminal Groove Records was founded by Justin Lee in 2012 shortly after his graduation from McGill University and while on tour with Stormwalker, Ascariasis, and The Afterimage. Lee formed the label with the goal of bringing together unsigned underground metal artists and promoting them to a wider audience and has noted that this, and not profit, is his primary goal in running the label. Consequently he works a full-time job unrelated to Subliminal Groove Records and manages the label after his work hours. The label's name was inspired by the sounds Lee hoped to promote, which he has summarized as progressive metal with some djent tones.

SGR transferred ownership to Nico Mirolla of Kardashev in 2017. In 2018, SGR dismissed all contracts entered an indefinite hiatus.

== Music ==
From its formation, Subliminal Groove Records searched for distinctive underground metal bands to support. The first artists the label signed were The Room Colored Charlatan, Stormwalker, and Ascariasis, followed by Foreboding Ether, The Engineered, and Ovid's Withering. The label continued to sign numerous other artists including Kardashev, Nexilva, and Separatist. The genres represented on Subliminal Groove Records' roster can be described as combinations of progressive metal, black metal, technical metal, deathcore, and death metal, with melodic and orchestral elements.

== Roster ==
=== Current artists ===
None

=== Former artists ===
- Ascariasis
- Delusions of Grandeur
- Kardashev
- littledidweknow
- Lorelei
- Ovid's Withering
- Xehanort
- Foreboding Ether
- As Oceans
- Change of Loyalty
- The Engineered
- The Healing
- Nemertines
- Nexilva
- The Parallel
- The Room Colored Charlatan
- Separatist
- Vitalism
- Stormwalker
