= Delirious (David Guetta song) =

Single by David Guetta featuring Tara McDonald

from the album Pop Life
- Released: 31 January 2008
- Recorded: 2007
- Genre: House, electro house
- Length: 4:31 (album version); 3:03 (radio edit)
- Label: Virgin, EMI
- Songwriters: David Guetta, Joachim Garraud, Carl Ryden, Tara McDonald
- Producers: David Guetta, Joachim Garraud, Sven Kirschner

David Guetta singles chronology
| "Baby When the Light" (2007) | "Delirious" (2008) | "Tomorrow Can Wait" (2008) |

Tara McDonald single singles chronology
| "My My My" (2006) | "Delirious" (2008) | "Tomorrow (Give in to the Night)" (2010) |

Music video
- "David Guetta - Delirious (Official Video)" on YouTube

"Delirious" is a house song performed by French DJ David Guetta and English singer-songwriter Tara McDonald (McDonald also co wrote the song) for Guetta's third studio album, Pop Life. The song was released as the album's fourth single on January 31, 2008. Several remixes of the song, including mixes by Fred Rister, Marc Mysterio, Laidback Luke, and Arno Cost and Norman Doray were released.

== Music video ==
A video clip for the song was filmed by Denys Thibaut in Montreal, featuring David Guetta and Tara McDonald, picturing an executive assistant (Kelly Thiebaud) throwing paint all over her boss's office. This is the first time that a "featuring" singer has appeared in a David Guetta music video.

== Track listing ==
- French CD single
1. "Delirious" (radio edit) – 3:01
2. "Delirious" (Laidback Luke Remix) – 8:09
3. "Delirious" (Original Extended Mix) – 7:54
- European CD single
1. "Delirious" (original extended mix) – 7:54
2. "Delirious" (Laidback Luke Remix) – 8:09
3. "Delirious" (Arno Cost & Norman Doray Remix) – 8:09
4. "Delirious" (Fred Rister Remix) – 7:35
5. "Delirious" (Radio Edit) – 3:01

== Charts ==
=== Weekly charts ===
Weekly chart performance for "Delirious"
| Chart (2008) | Peak Position |
|---|---|
| Austria (Ö3 Austria Top 40) | 27 |
| Belgium (Ultratop 50 Flanders) | 17 |
| Belgium (Ultratop 50 Wallonia) | 2 |
| CIS Airplay (TopHit) | 18 |
| France (SNEP) | 16 |
| Germany (GfK) | 59 |
| Hungary (Dance Top 40) | 7 |
| Hungary (Rádiós Top 40) | 36 |
| Italy (Musica e Dischi) | 22 |
| Netherlands (Dutch Top 40) | 12 |
| Netherlands (Single Top 100) | 12 |
| Romanian Singles Chart | 29 |
| Russia Airplay (TopHit) | 19 |
| Sweden (Sverigetopplistan) | 51 |
| Switzerland (Schweizer Hitparade) | 16 |

=== Year-end charts ===
Year-end chart performance for "Delirious"
| Chart (2008) | Position |
|---|---|
| Belgium (Ultratop Flanders) | 90 |
| Belgium (Ultratop Wallonia) | 36 |
| CIS (TopHit) | 166 |
| France (SNEP) | 69 |
| Hungary (Dance Top 40) | 42 |
| Netherlands (Dutch Top 40) | 84 |
| Russia Airplay (TopHit) | 144 |
| Switzerland (Schweizer Hitparade) | 82 |
