= DJ Tocadisco =

German DJ and producer (born 1974)

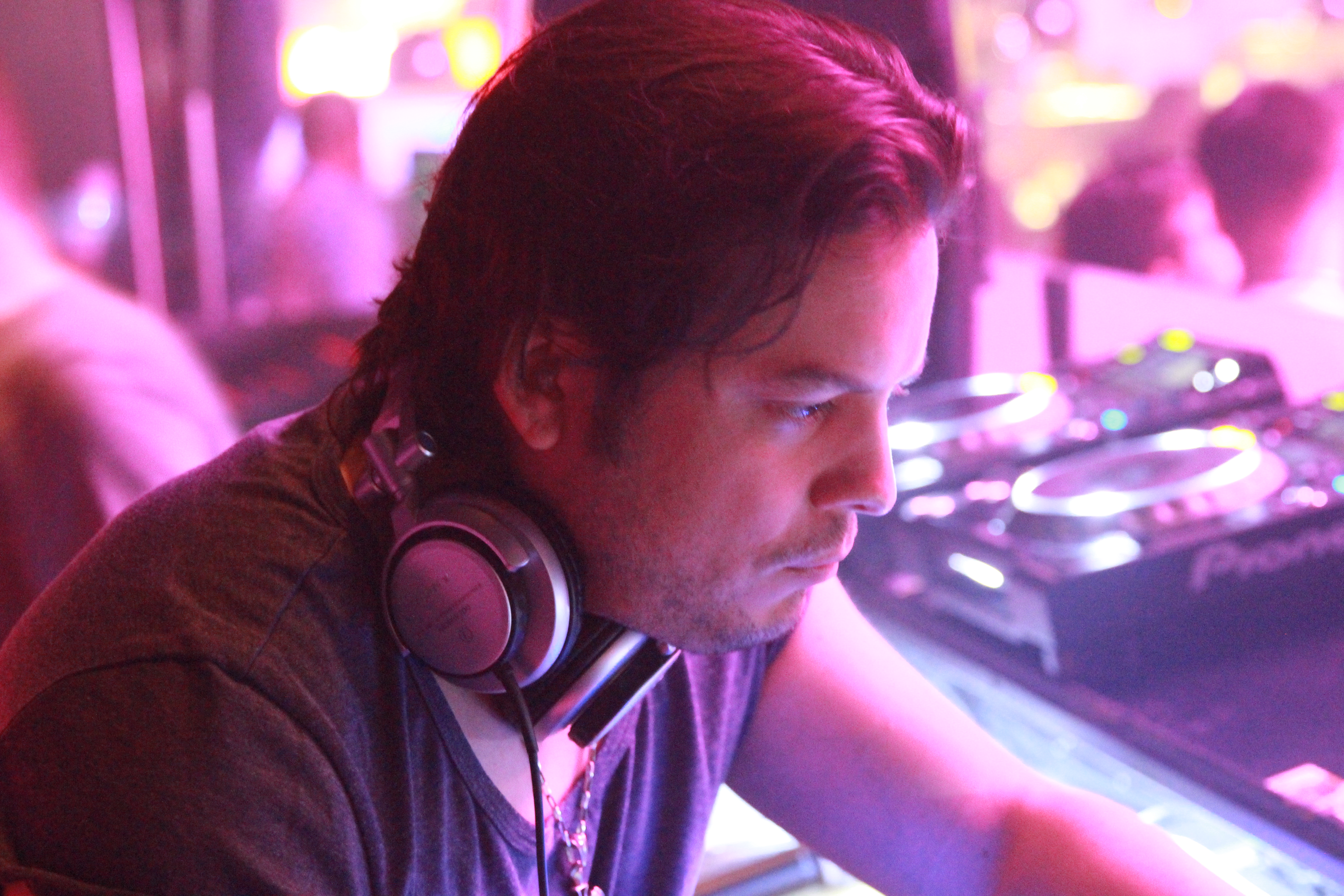
- Todadisco in November 2013

Background information
- Born: Roman Böer; 9 June 1974 (age 51); Berlin, Germany
- Website: www.tocadisco.com

Roman Böer (German pronunciation: [ʁoˈmaːn ˈbøːɐ]; born 9 June 1974), better known as DJ Tocadisco, formerly Tocadisco (pronounced [tokaˈðisko], Spanish for "turntable"), is a German DJ and record producer.

== Biography ==
Born in Berlin, the son of the photographer and media designer Gerry Böer. He grew up in Mönchengladbach, where he also regularly hangs at the club "Die Nacht" ("the night").

In 1996, Tocadisco began his professional career as a DJ at Club Unique in Düsseldorf. The club was elected as the "best club in town" during his stint by the magazine Prinz. In 2000 Tocadisco moved to Cologne and taught there at a studio.

He produced several remixes for different record companies. The best-known case was "Lifetimes" by Slam. His mix was chosen as one of the 12 best remixes of 2001 by the readers of the magazine Groove. In October 2003, he signed a contract with the German record company Superstar Recordings. His first single under this label was "Nobody (Likes the Records That I Play)". It reached number 39 in the German charts. In 2005, Tocadisco was chosen by the magazine Raveline as one of the best newcomers of 2004. Tocadisco's remix of Mylo's In My Arms became one of the most played dance tracks of the year. This was followed by his second single "You're No Good for Me" 'and then the double single Music Loud / Crazy Cursor.

Tocadisco published a series of club EP's under the pseudonym: "AC / OT" courtesy of Superstar Recordings, In 2006, Tocadisco remixed a track by Michael Cretu's project "Enigma - Eppur si muove" of Enigma's latest album A Posteriori.

His remix for The Egg's "Walking Away" was chosen by Citroën for the advertising campaign for the C4 hatchback. Furthermore, David Guetta took the instrumental and mixed it with one of his songs, "Love Don't Let Me Go". This bootleg version became "David Guetta vs. The Egg" - "Love Don't Let Me Go (Walking Away)", reaching No. 3 on the UK Singles Chart.

On 25 January 2008, his first album Solo was released. In August of the same year, the song "Tomorrow Can Wait" featuring David Guetta and Chris Willis was released to some success.

He has produced with New Order, Tiga, David Guetta, Kelis, Fatboy Slim, Robin Schulz, Steve Angello, Axwell, Armin van Buuren and many more music producers and writers.

On September 18, 2009, his second album, TOCA 128.0 FM, appeared on the German dance label, Superstar Recordings.

In 2009 he got married with the Brazilian model Natasha Garcez, together they created a well known party named "Tocacabana" where have guests like Avicci, David Guetta and AfroJack.

2011 saw the single "Tequila Sunrise", which was published in cooperation with the Dutch producer Afrojack.

== Discography ==
=== Albums ===
- Solo (2008)
- IV (2016)
- Chuchotage (2021)
- FR3E

=== Singles ===
Year	Title	Artist(s)	Length
2008	"Tomorrow Can Wait" (radio edit)	David Guetta, Chris Willis, Tocadisco	3:10
2009	"Way of Love" (Tocadisco's album club version)	Tocadisco, Vangosh	5:44
2011	"Tequila Sunrise"	Afrojack, Tocadisco	8:00
2011	"Malditos Meteoritos"	Tocadisco, Wally Lopez	6:10
2012	"BAT3RIA"	Tocadisco	4:28
2012	"Don't Go"	Tocadisco, Ron Carroll	6:57
2012	"That Miami Track" (feat. Julian Smith)	Tocadisco, Julian Smith	3:38
2012	"Wild Thing"	Tocadisco	5:30
2012	"Saturn"	Tocadisco	5:23
2012	"Cataratas"	Tocadisco	7:00
2012	"Oldschool"	Tocadisco	5:15
2012	"King of Miami"	Tocadisco	5:58
2013	"Alter Schwede!"	Tocadisco	5:31
2013	"Get Away" (feat. Lennart A. Salomon)	Tocadisco	6:20
2013	"F*ck That" (feat. Julian Smith)	Tocadisco	5:00
2013	"Strobe Lights and Sh*t"	Tocadisco	5:30
2013	"No Blues"	Tocadisco	6:36
2013	"Sunset Blues"	Tocadisco	6:27
2013	"Africa"	Tocadisco	6:49
2013	"Garage 674"	Tocadisco	6:02
2013	"Phoenix" (original club mix)	Tocadisco, Roland Clark	5:37
2014	"Broken Rolex"	Tocadisco	5:55
2014	"Cinderella"	Tocadisco	5:41
2014	"Acid" (feat. Nathizinha)	Tocadisco, Nathizinha	6:14
2014	"Hämatom"	Tocadisco	6:51
2015	"Granulat"	Tocadisco	6:11
2019	"Another Dimension"	Tocadisco	7:52
2019	"Slave to the Rhythm"	Tocadisco	7:52
2019	"Can't Sleep"	Tocadisco	6:37
2020	"In Love with an Alien"	Tocadisco	3:47
2020	"Herz explodiert"	Tocadisco	4:20
2021	"Tanz mit mir" (single version)	Tocadisco	3:55
2021	"Are You Ok" (single version)	Tocadisco	3:17
2022	"Der Drop" (Scheiss drauf)	Tocadisco, Jean Pearl	4:39
2023	"Universal Love"	Tocadisco, Muli Art, Shelly Malia	4:03
2023	"Dein Saft"	Tocadisco	5:24
2023	"Foehnix"	Tocadisco	2:25
2023	"La Revolution"	Tocadisco	5:44

=== Remixes ===
Year	Title	Original	Original artist(s)	Versions	Label	notes
1999	Look Of Today (Tocadisco Remix)	Look Of Today	Enigma	single	EMI	(CDr, Single, Unofficial)
2000	Fantasy (El Tocadisco's Virgin Mary Mix)	Fantasy	Studio 69 feat. Karl Frierson	2		Air (as El Tocadisco)
2001	Do You Want Me? (El Tocadiso's Las Palmas Mix)	Do You Want Me?	Studio 69 feat. Karl Frierson	2		Air, Air(as El Tocadisco)
2001	Lifetimes (Konigswasser Mix By El Tocadisco)	Lifetimes	Slam		Zomba Records	
2001	Gotta Get Thru This (El Tocadisco's and 3 more...	Gotta Get Thru This	Daniel Bedingfield	2	Jive Records	
2001	El Arbi (Tocadisco's Mix)	El Arbi	Libre	2		Air, Air
2001	Lifetimes (Königswasser Mix By El Tocadisco) Tyrone 'Visionary' Palmer	Lifetimes	Slam		Kontor Records, Universal Music Group, Polystar	(as El Tocadisco) appears on Various - Kontor - Top Of The Clubs Volume 13
2001	Soca Dance (El Tocadisco's Rework)	Soca Dance	Bruce Wayne			Tasted
2002	Promised Land (Toca Disco Remix)		Studio 69 Feat. Karl Frierson	2		(as Toca Disco)Air
2002	L.o.v.e. (El Tocadisco Beat On The Funk Mix)	L.O.V.E. (Makin' Love In My Car)	Honey Bunch		BMG	(as El Tocadisco)
2002	OOO La La La (Tocadisco Remix)	OOO La La La	Justine Earp		House Master Records	
2002	Promised Land (Toca Disco Remix)		DJ Antoine		Muve Recordings	(as El Tocadisco)Mainstation 2002 - Housesession (CD, Comp, Mixed)
2002	Soca Dance (Tocadisco Rework)	Soca Dance			Urban Essentials	(as El Tocadisco) Various - Brazilian Basics 4 (CD, Comp, Mixed)
2003	Freaks (DJ Tocadisco Mix)	Freaks			Polystar	Various - The Annual 2004 - German Edition (2xCD, Comp, Mixed) Polystar
2004	Nobody (Likes The Records That I Play) (TD's On The Tube Version) (as TD)	Nobody (Likes The Records That I Play)	DJ Tocadisco		'Spinnin' Records	(as TD)
2004	(I Just Want To Be A) Drummer (DJ Tocadisco Remix)	(I Just Want To Be A) Drummer	Heavy Rock		Superstar Recordings	(as El Tocadisco)
2004	Freaks (DJ Tocadisco Mix)	Freaks	Moguai	4	Superstar Recordings	(as DJ Tocadisco) Moguai - Freaks
2004	Bang Bang (DJ Tocadisco's and 3 more.	Bang Bang	Toktok Und Nena	4	Superstar Recordings	
2004	Bang Bang (DJ Tocadisco's 'Don't Fake The Break' Mix)	Bang Bang	Toktok Und Nena		Polystar	Various - Kontor - Top Of The Clubs Volume 23 (2xCD, Comp, Mixed)
2004	(I Just Want To Be) A Drummer (DJ Tocadisco Remix)		John Course & Mark Dynamix		Ministry of Sound	(as DJ Tocadisco) Sessions One (2xCD, Mixed, Comp)
2004	Freaks (DJ Tocadisco Mix)	Freaks	Disco Boys		Kontor Records	The - The Disco Boys - Volume 4 (2xCD
2005	Walking Away (Tocadisco's Acid Walk Mix)	Walking Away	The Egg	13	Great Stuff Recordings	(as El Tocadisco)
2005	In My Arms (Tocadisco's Zwishen Den Stühlen Mix)	In My Arms	Erick Morillo		Subliminal Groove Records	Subliminal Sessions Nine (3xCD, Comp, Mixed)
2006	S.O.S. (Tocadisco's Tu No Me Conoces Mix)	S.O.S.	A Studio Feat. Polina	7	Absolution	
	Turbulence (Tocadisco Remix)		Laidback Luke, Steve Aoki & Lil Jon			
	Youtopia (Tocadisco Remix)	Youtopia	Armin Van Buuren featuring Adam Young			
	Pong (Tocadisco Remix)		Wippenberg			
	Together (Tocadisco Remix)		Axwell & Sebastian Ingrosso			
	Body Language (Tocadisco Remix)		M.A.N.D.Y			
	Bones Theme (Tocadisco Remix)		The Crystal Method			
