= Love Is Gone =

2007 single by David Guetta and Chris Willis

Single by David Guetta and Chris Willis

from the album Pop Life
- Released: 23 April 2007
- Genre: Electro house
- Length: 3:08 (original mix); 8:21 (Fred Rister & Joachim Garraud Remix); 3:22 (Fred Rister & Joachim Garraud radio edit)
- Label: Virgin
- Composers: David Guetta; Frédéric Riesterer; Joachim Garraud
- Lyricist: Chris Willis
- Producers: David Guetta; Frédéric Riesterer; Joachim Garraud

David Guetta singles chronology
"Love Don't Let Me Go (Walking Away)" (2006)	"Love Is Gone" (2007)	"Baby When the Light" (2007)

Chris Willis singles chronology
"Love Don't Let Me Go (Walking Away)" (2006)	"Love Is Gone" (2007)	"Give It All You Got" (2007)

Music video
- "Love Is Gone" on YouTube

"Love Is Gone" is a song by French house DJ David Guetta and American singer Chris Willis. It is the second single from Guetta's third studio album, Pop Life. The single was released in France in June 2007 and in the UK in August 2007. The song reached No. 9 on the UK Singles Chart, becoming his second Top 10 hit. The song also received crossover airplay on top 40 radio stations in the United States, leading it to reach No. 98 on the Billboard Hot 100 singles chart. The song has been remixed by its co-producers Frédéric Riesterer (as Fred Rister) & Joachim Garraud, Eddie Thoneick, Fuzzy Hair and Amo & Navas. The Fred Rister & Joachim Garraud remix was the first David Guetta production to use a guitar sample which was later used in the songs "I Gotta Feeling" by the Black Eyed Peas and "Gettin' Over". The music video of the song features American actress Kelly Thiebaud.

== Track listings ==
- UK CD1
1. "Love Is Gone" (Fred Rister & Joachim Garraud Radio Edit) – 3:22
2. "Love Don't Let Me Go" (Original Edit) – 3:39
- UK CD2
1. "Love Is Gone" (Fred Rister & Joachim Garraud Radio Edit) – 3:22
2. "Love Is Gone" (Original Extended Mix) – 6:43
3. "Love Is Gone" (Fred Rister & Joachim Garraud Remix) – 8:21
4. "Love Is Gone" (Fuzzy Hair Remix) – 6:25
5. "Love Is Gone" (Eddie Thoneick's Liberte Mix) – 7:12
6. "Love Is Gone" (Amo & Navas Rmx) – 6:46
- French CD Single
1. "Love Is Gone" (Fred Rister & Joachim Garraud Radio Edit) – 3:22
2. "Love Is Gone" (Original Mix) – 3:08
3. "Love Is Gone" (Eddie Thoneick's Liberte Mix) – 7:12
4. "Medley Album Pop Life" – 2:50
- European CD Single
1. "Love Is Gone" (Original Extended Mix) – 6:43
2. "Love Is Gone" (Fred Rister & Joachim Garraud Remix) – 8:21
3. "Love Is Gone" (Fuzzy Hair Remix) – 6:25
4. "Love Is Gone" (Eddie Thoneick's Liberte Mix) – 7:12
5. "Love Is Gone" (Eddie Thoneick's Ruff Mix) – 7:10
6. "Love Is Gone" (Amo & Navas Rmx) – 6:46
7. "Love Is Gone" (Original Mix) – 3:08
8. "Love Is Gone" (Fred Rister & Joachim Garraud Radio Edit) – 3:22

== Charts ==
=== Weekly charts ===
Chart (2007–2008)	Peak position
Austria (Ö3 Austria Top 40)	15
Belgium (Ultratop 50 Flanders)	21
Belgium (Ultratop 50 Wallonia)	9
Canada Hot 100 (Billboard)	66
Europe (Eurochart Hot 100)	6
Finland (Suomen virallinen lista)	6
France (SNEP)	3
Germany (GfK)	36
Greece (IFPI)	38
Hungary (Dance Top 40)	1
Hungary (Rádiós Top 40)	1
Hungary (Single Top 40)	2
Ireland (IRMA)	21
Italy (FIMI)	28
Netherlands (Dutch Top 40)	14
Netherlands (Single Top 100)	10
Romania (Airplay 100)	5
Russia Airplay (TopHit)	9
Scottish Singles Sales (Official Charts)	13
Spain (Promusicae)	8
Sweden (Sverigetopplistan)	9
Switzerland (Schweizer Hitparade)	11
UK Singles (Official Charts)	9
UK Dance (Official Charts)	1
US Billboard Hot 100	98
US Dance Airplay (Billboard)	1
US Pop Airplay (Billboard)	39

=== Year-end charts ===
Chart (2007)	Position
Belgium (Ultratop 50 Flanders)	95
Belgium (Ultratop 50 Wallonia)	34
CIS (TopHit)	4
Europe (Eurochart Hot 100)	36
France (SNEP)	14
Hungary (Dance Top 40)	3
Hungary (Rádiós Top 40)	9
France (SNEP)	14
Netherlands (Dutch Top 40)	85
Netherlands (Single Top 100)	75
Romania (Romanian Top 100)	18
Russia Airplay (TopHit)	25
Sweden (Sverigetopplistan)	97
Switzerland (Schweizer Hitparade)	35
UK Singles (OCC)	109

Chart (2008)	Position
Brazil (Crowley)	75
Hungary (Dance Top 40)	43
Hungary (Rádiós Top 40)	29
Switzerland (Schweizer Hitparade)	73

=== Decade-end charts ===
Decade-end chart performance for "Love Is Gone"
Chart (2000–2009)	Position
Russia Airplay (TopHit)	128

== Certifications ==
Region	Certification	Certified units/sales
France (SNEP)	Gold	200,000^{*}
United Kingdom (BPI)	Silver	200,000^{‡}
^{*} Sales figures based on certification alone.^{‡} Sales+streaming figures based on certification alone.
