= Cozi Costi =

- Also known as: Cozi Costi
- Origin: London, England
- Genres: Electronic, house
- Occupations: Singer, songwriter
- Years active: 1995–present
- Formerly of: TSD

Cozi Costi is an English electronic music session vocalist.

She was a member of the short-lived girl group TSD in the mid-1990s, together with Claire Richards who went on to become a member of Steps.

Cozi Costi co-wrote and sang backing vocals on the song "Naughty Girl" by Australian singer Holly Valance in 2002. Among her vocal collaborations is the song "Baby When the Light" by French DJ David Guetta. Credited to 'David Guetta featuring Cozi', "Baby When the Light", from Guetta's 2007 platinum-selling album Pop Life, reached No. 6 on the French singles chart and No. 50 on the UK Singles Chart.

Other vocal contributions include the songs "The Storm" by Jerry Ropero and "Sensual" by PhonJaxx.

Songwriting credits include Morcheeba's "Sweet LA", Alexandra Burke's "Beating Still", Nabiha's "The Enemy", "You", "Sound of My Gun" and "Ask Yourself", Bo Bruce's "Golden", Petula Clarke's "Everyword You Say", Junior Caldera's "Bang Bang" and "Just a Little Bit", Sucker DJs' "Fireworks", Alex Gaudino's "This Time" and Booty Luv's "Dance Dance".
