= Hero (Afrojack and David Guetta song) =

2021 single by Afrojack and David Guetta

Single by Afrojack and David Guetta
- Released: 30 April 2021
- Genre: Progressive house
- Length: 2:51
- Label: Wall
- Songwriters: Nick van de Wall; David Guetta; Mikkel S. Eriksen; Tor Erik Hermansen; Ellie Goulding; Jamie Scott; Ryan Tedder
- Producers: Afrojack; David Guetta; Stargate; DubVision

Afrojack singles chronology
"Stay Mine" (2021)	"Hero" (2021)	"All Night Long" (2021)

David Guetta singles chronology
"Bed" (2021)	"Hero" (2021)	"Get Together" (2021)

Music video
- "Hero" on YouTube

"Hero" is a song by Dutch DJ Afrojack and French DJ David Guetta. The song was released on 30 April 2021 under Afrojack's own label Wall Recordings, and was notably performed at the Eurovision Song Contest 2021 grand final on 22 May 2021.

The song was written by Afrojack, Guetta, Mikkel S. Eriksen and Tor Erik Hermansen of production duo Stargate, English singer-songwriter Ellie Goulding, English singer Jamie Scott, and American musician Ryan Tedder of the band OneRepublic. The song was produced by Afrojack, Guetta, Stargate and Dutch production duo DubVision. Although Goulding was the vocalist on the demo version of the song, the vocals on the final version were performed by American singer Luxtides (a.k.a. Danni Bouchard). However, she is not billed as a credited singer.

== Critical reception ==
"Hero" was described as an "inspiring summer song" and "a crossover between pop and EDM". American web site EDM.com said that the song clearly refers back to the sound of the early 2010s which since then had eroded a bit, but that "(...)after a brutal year devoid of live music thanks to the fury of COVID-19, many ravers have found themselves nostalgic, desperately clinging to memories of simpler times in the throes of solitude. Afrojack hopes "Hero" can serve as a time machine."

== Track listing ==
Digital download
No.	Title	Length
1.	"Hero"	2:51

== Charts ==
=== Weekly charts ===
Weekly chart performance
Chart (2021)	Peak position
Belgium (Ultratip Bubbling Under Flanders)	15
France (SNEP)	192
Netherlands (Dutch Top 40)	3
Netherlands (Single Top 100)	14
Sweden Heatseeker (Sverigetopplistan)	6
US Hot Dance/Electronic Songs (Billboard)	22
Venezuela (Record Report)	40

=== Year-end charts ===
Year-end chart performance
Chart (2021)	Position
Netherlands (Dutch Top 40)	8
Netherlands (Single Top 100)	59
