= One Love (David Guetta song) =

Single by David Guetta featuring Estelle

from the album One Love
- Released: 23 November 2009
- Length: 4:00 (album version); 3:14 (radio edit)
- Label: Virgin; EMI Music France
- Songwriters: David Guetta; Jean-Claude Sindres; Sandy Wilhelm; Estelle Swaray (lyricist)
- Producers: David Guetta; Jean-Claude Sindres; Sandy Vee

David Guetta singles chronology
"Grrrr" (2009)	"One Love" (2009)	"Memories" (2010)

Estelle singles chronology
"World Go Round" (2009)	"One Love" (2009)	"Freak" (2010)

Music video
- "David Guetta feat. Estelle - One Love (Official Video)" on YouTube

"One Love" is the third single released by French DJ and record producer David Guetta from his fourth studio album of the same name. The single was released in the United Kingdom on 23 November 2009. It features guest vocals by Grammy Award-winning British singer Estelle. It was added to the BBC Radio 1 playlist the week of 28 October 2009.

== Critical reception ==
David Balls of Digital Spy gave the song a positive review stating:

David Guetta must feel like le chat who got la crème. During 2009, the French knob-twiddler has notched up a pair of No. 1s ('When Love Takes Over', 'Sexy Bitch'), produced The Black Eyed Peas' record-breaking smash 'I Gotta Feeling', and teamed up with a glittering array of A-list stars for his One Love album. What's more, he hasn't run of out puff just yet. This time around, he's recruited our very own Estelle to help him pack out the dancefloor. His production's as clubby and anthemic as ever, but it's La Swaray who brings that extra bit of magic to 'One Love'. As with her 2005 Faithless collaboration 'Why Go?', her vocals ooze a melancholy optimism that dovetails perfectly with the heady beats. The result not only extends Guetta's winning streak, but also whets the appetite for Estelle LP#3 – in prog now.

== Music video ==
The official video for the song was directed by X. It was filmed on 17 October 2009 in Los Angeles and released on 12 November 2009 on David Guetta's official YouTube channel. The video features Guetta and Estelle getting into a black 1967 Camaro with Guetta playing the upcoming song on his Nokia phone and features them driving though the city. As they go they find depressed people and make them happy, causing them to dance as they send their love through the shape of a heart created by their hands.

== Track listing ==
UK CD single

1. "One Love" (radio edit) (featuring Estelle) – 4:00
2. "One Love" (extended mix) (featuring Estelle) – 6:46

European CD single

1. "One Love" (extended mix) (featuring Estelle) – 6:46
2. "One Love" (Chuckie & Fatman Scoop Remix) (featuring Estelle) – 8:00
3. "One Love" (Avicii Remix) (featuring Estelle) – 7:45
4. "One Love" (Calvin Harris Remix) (featuring Estelle) – 6:00
5. "One Love" (Arias Remix) (featuring Estelle) – 7:08
6. "One Love" (Chocolate Puma Remix) (featuring Estelle) – 4:48
7. "One Love" (radio edit) (featuring Estelle) – 4:00

== Charts ==
=== Weekly charts ===
Chart (2009–10)	Peak position
Australia (ARIA)	36
Austria (Ö3 Austria Top 40)	20
Belgium (Ultratip Bubbling Under Flanders)	4
Belgium (Ultratip Bubbling Under Wallonia)	1
CIS Airplay (TopHit)	4
Czech Republic Airplay (ČNS IFPI)	23
French Download (SNEP)	46
Germany (GfK)	18
Hungary (Dance Top 40)	1
Hungary (Rádiós Top 40)	19
Hungary (Single Top 40)	10
Israeli Airplay Chart	2
Netherlands (Dutch Top 40)	19
Netherlands (Single Top 100)	53
Polish Dance Chart	7
Romania Airplay (Media Forest)	4
Russia Airplay (TopHit)	6
Scotland Singles (OCC)	48
Slovak Airplay Chart	2
Switzerland (Schweizer Hitparade)	48
UK Singles (OCC)	46
UK Dance (OCC)	4
US Dance Club Songs (Billboard)	1

=== Year-end charts ===
Chart (2009)	Position
CIS (Tophit)	199
Hungary (Dance Top 40)	94
Chart (2010)	Position
CIS (Tophit)	34
Hungary (Dance Top 40)	11
Russia Airplay (TopHit)	54
US Dance Club Songs (Billboard)	44

== See also ==
- List of number-one dance singles of 2010 (U.S.)
