= List of European number-one hits of 2009 =

This is a list of the European Hot 100 Singles and European Top 100 Albums number ones of 2009, as published by Billboard magazine.

== Chart history ==
Key
†	Indicates best-performing single and album of 2009

Issue date	Song	Artist	Album	Artist	Ref.
7 January	"Hot n Cold"	Katy Perry	Black Ice	AC/DC	
14 January	"Hot n Cold"	Katy Perry	Rockferry	Duffy	
21 January	"Hot n Cold"	Katy Perry	Funhouse	Pink	
28 January	"Hot n Cold"	Katy Perry	The Crying Light	Antony and the Johnsons	
4 February	"Hot n Cold"	Katy Perry	Working on a Dream	Bruce Springsteen	
11 February	"Broken Strings"	James Morrison featuring Nelly Furtado	Working on a Dream	Bruce Springsteen	
18 February	"Broken Strings"	James Morrison featuring Nelly Furtado	Working on a Dream	Bruce Springsteen	
25 February	"Poker Face" †	Lady Gaga	Working on a Dream	Bruce Springsteen	
4 March	"Poker Face" †	Lady Gaga	Invaders Must Die	The Prodigy	
11 March	"Poker Face" †	Lady Gaga	No Line on the Horizon	U2	
18 March	"Poker Face" †	Lady Gaga	No Line on the Horizon	U2	
25 March	"Poker Face" †	Lady Gaga	No Line on the Horizon	U2	
1 April	"Poker Face" †	Lady Gaga	No Line on the Horizon	U2	
8 April	"Poker Face" †	Lady Gaga	No Line on the Horizon	U2	
15 April	"Poker Face" †	Lady Gaga	No Line on the Horizon	U2	
22 April	"Poker Face" †	Lady Gaga	The Fame †	Lady Gaga	
29 April	"Poker Face" †	Lady Gaga	Sounds of the Universe	Depeche Mode	
6 May	"Poker Face" †	Lady Gaga	Sounds of the Universe	Depeche Mode	
13 May	"Poker Face" †	Lady Gaga	Sounds of the Universe	Depeche Mode	
20 May	"Poker Face" †	Lady Gaga	Sounds of the Universe	Depeche Mode	
27 May	"Poker Face" †	Lady Gaga	21st Century Breakdown	Green Day	
3 June	"Poker Face" †	Lady Gaga	21st Century Breakdown	Green Day	
10 June	"Boom Boom Pow"	The Black Eyed Peas	21st Century Breakdown	Green Day	
17 June	"Poker Face" †	Lady Gaga	Battle for the Sun	Placebo	
24 June	"Boom Boom Pow"	The Black Eyed Peas	Battle for the Sun	Placebo	
1 July	"Boom Boom Pow"	The Black Eyed Peas	Black Clouds & Silver Linings	Dream Theater	
8 July	"When Love Takes Over"	David Guetta featuring Kelly Rowland	King of Pop	Michael Jackson	
15 July	"When Love Takes Over"	David Guetta featuring Kelly Rowland	King of Pop	Michael Jackson	
22 July	"I Know You Want Me (Calle Ocho)"	Pitbull	King of Pop	Michael Jackson	
29 July	"I Know You Want Me (Calle Ocho)"	Pitbull	King of Pop	Michael Jackson	
5 August	"I Know You Want Me (Calle Ocho)"	Pitbull	The Collection	Michael Jackson	
12 August	"I Know You Want Me (Calle Ocho)"	Pitbull	The Collection	Michael Jackson	
19 August	"I Know You Want Me (Calle Ocho)"	Pitbull	King of Pop	Michael Jackson	
26 August	"I Know You Want Me (Calle Ocho)"	Pitbull	The E.N.D.	The Black Eyed Peas	
2 September	"I Gotta Feeling"	The Black Eyed Peas	Humbug	Arctic Monkeys	
9 September	"Sexy Chick"	David Guetta featuring Akon	I Look to You	Whitney Houston	
16 September	"Sexy Chick"	David Guetta featuring Akon	One Love	David Guetta	
23 September	"Sexy Chick"	David Guetta featuring Akon	The Resistance	Muse	
30 September	"Sexy Chick"	David Guetta featuring Akon	Celebration	Madonna	
7 October	"Sexy Chick"	David Guetta featuring Akon	Celebration	Madonna	
14 October	"Sexy Chick"	David Guetta featuring Akon	Celebration	Madonna	
21 October	"Bodies"	Robbie Williams	Celebration	Madonna	
28 October	"Bodies"	Robbie Williams	Liebe ist für alle da	Rammstein	
4 November	"Sexy Chick"	David Guetta featuring Akon	Michael Jackson's This Is It	Michael Jackson	
11 November	"Sexy Chick"	David Guetta featuring Akon	Michael Jackson's This Is It	Michael Jackson	
18 November	"I Gotta Feeling"	The Black Eyed Peas	Reality Killed the Video Star	Robbie Williams	
25 November	"I Gotta Feeling"	The Black Eyed Peas	Reality Killed the Video Star	Robbie Williams	
2 December	"Meet Me Halfway"	The Black Eyed Peas	Reality Killed the Video Star	Robbie Williams	
9 December	"Meet Me Halfway"	The Black Eyed Peas	I Dreamed a Dream	Susan Boyle	
16 December	"Meet Me Halfway"	The Black Eyed Peas	I Dreamed a Dream	Susan Boyle	
23 December	"Meet Me Halfway"	The Black Eyed Peas	I Dreamed a Dream	Susan Boyle	
30 December	"Meet Me Halfway"	The Black Eyed Peas	Reality Killed the Video Star	Robbie Williams	
