= Memories (David Guetta song) =

2010 single by David Guetta

Single by David Guetta featuring Kid Cudi

from the album One Love
- Released: 6 February 2010
- Recorded: April 2009
- Genre: Hip house
- Length: 3:28 (album version); 2:38 (radio edit)
- Label: EMI; Virgin
- Songwriters: David Guetta; Scott Mescudi; Frédéric Riesterer
- Producers: David Guetta; Frédéric Riesterer

David Guetta singles chronology
"One Love" (2009)	"Memories" (2010)	"Gettin' Over You" (2010)

Kid Cudi singles chronology
"Pursuit of Happiness" (2009)	"Memories" (2010)	"That Tree" (2010)

Music video
- "Memories" on YouTube

"Memories" is a song by French DJ and record producer David Guetta featuring American rapper Kid Cudi. Written alongside Frédéric Riesterer, who produced it with Guetta, it was released in February 2010 as the fourth single from his fourth studio album, One Love. The song became a top five hit in Guetta's native country of France as well as Austria, Belgium, Czech Republic, Australia, the Netherlands, Finland, Poland, New Zealand, and Ireland; it charted within the top ten in Germany, Hungary, Switzerland, and Denmark, with the song reaching a peak of 46 in Cudi's native of the US, where it also achieved platinum certification by the RIAA. The music video was filmed in Miami and directed by Keith Schofield.

== Critical reception ==
Robert Copsey of Digital Spy gave the song a positive review stating: "Here he drafts in Kid 'Day N' Nite' Cudi to lay down the vocals over his trademark piano-backed beats. All the makings of a Guetta classic are present and correct, and Cudi's nonchalant, mellow vocals are pleasant enough, but it all feels that bit too familiar. It's hard to avoid the conclusion that 'Memories' adds nothing new to a sound that seemingly took over the world in '09 – not that anyone's going to grumble when it comes on at Oceana this Friday night, of course".

== Music video ==
The music video was filmed in Miami on 4 January 2010. It was directed by Keith Schofield. It shows Kid Cudi, wearing a Guns N' Roses T-shirt and a Cleveland Indians baseball hat, and David Guetta walking along Biscayne Boulevard, while the club scenes were filmed in Nocturnal. Fans were invited to be in the club scene. There is also a scene that takes place in a Franck Provost hair dressing salon, where a hairdresser is using a hair dryer on a hairless man, and another applies shaving foam in a circle on another client's head. It shows the camera crew to be nude models, who are seen reflecting in windows, metal objects and mirrors throughout the video with certain areas censored out. A super clean version of the video was released for use in public settings. Guetta wears a pair of Reebok Pumps in the video.

== 2021 remix ==
In 2021, Guetta released a new remix of the track. The remix was premiered during his New Year's live set from the French Louvre museum. It was also released as a reaction to the TikTok hype around the original track, which became popular during the lockdown due to COVID-19.

== Track listing ==
- UK CD single
1. "Memories" – 3:28
2. "Memories" (Fuck Me I'm Famous Remix) – 6:06
- French CD single
1. "Memories" – 3:28
2. "Memories" (Extended) – 5:20
3. "Memories" (Fuck Me I'm Famous Remix) – 6:06

== Charts ==
=== Weekly charts ===
Weekly chart performance for "Memories"
Chart (2010–21)	Peak position
Australia (ARIA)	3
Austria (Ö3 Austria Top 40)	2
Belgium (Ultratop 50 Flanders)	2
Belgian Airplay (Ultratop Flanders)	1
Belgium (Ultratop 50 Wallonia)	1
Belgian Airplay (Ultratop Wallonia)	1
Canada Hot 100 (Billboard)	18
Czech Republic Airplay (ČNS IFPI)	2
Czech Republic Singles Digital (ČNS IFPI)	70
Denmark (Tracklisten)	8
Europe (European Hot 100 Singles)	3
Finland (Suomen virallinen lista)	4
France (SNEP)	5
Germany (GfK)	6
Global 200 (Billboard)	150
Hungary (Rádiós Top 40)	16
Hungary (Dance Top 40)	1
Hungary (Single Top 40)	7
Ireland (IRMA)	5
Israel International Airplay (Media Forest)	8
Italy (FIMI)	13
Luxembourg Digital Songs (Billboard)	2
Netherlands (Dutch Top 40)	4
Netherlands (Single Top 100)	3
New Zealand (Recorded Music NZ)	4
Norway (VG-lista)	11
Poland (Polish Airplay TV)	2
Poland Dance (ZPAV)	1
Romania Airplay (Media Forest)	4
Russia Airplay (TopHit)	16
Spain (Promusicae)	17
Spain (Spanish Airplay Chart)	11
Sweden (Sverigetopplistan)	14
Switzerland (Schweizer Hitparade)	7
UK Dance (Official Charts)	2
UK Singles (Official Charts)	15
US Billboard Hot 100	46
US Dance Club Songs (Billboard)	7
US Pop Airplay (Billboard)	22
US Rhythmic Airplay (Billboard)	17

=== 2021 remix ===
Chart (2021)	Peak position
Hungary (Dance Top 40)	5
Slovakia (Singles Digitál Top 100)	83
US Hot Dance/Electronic Songs (Billboard)	31

=== Year-end charts ===
Chart (2010)	Position
Australia (ARIA)	29
Austria (Ö3 Austria Top 40)	21
Belgium (Ultratop Flanders)	7
Belgium (Ultratop Wallonia)	4
Canada (Canadian Hot 100)	68
European Hot 100 Singles	17
France (SNEP)	28
Germany (Official German Charts)	29
Hungary (Dance Top 40)	2
Hungary (Rádiós Top 40)	78
Italy (FIMI)	43
Netherlands (Dutch Top 40)	4
Netherlands (Single Top 100)	10
New Zealand (RMNZ)	27
Romanian Top 100	23
Russia Airplay (TopHit)	118
Spain (PROMUSICAE)	38
Sweden (Sverigetopplistan)	41
Switzerland (Schweizer Hitparade)	29
UK Singles (Official Charts Company)	99

Chart (2011)	Position
Hungary (Rádiós Top 40)	79

Chart (2021)	Position
France (SNEP)	58
Switzerland (Schweizer Hitparade)	72

=== 2021 remix ===
Chart (2021)	Position
Hungary (Dance Top 40)	13
US Hot Dance/Electronic Songs (Billboard)	81

Chart (2022)	Position
Hungary (Dance Top 40)	22

== Certifications ==
Region	Certification	Certified units/sales
Australia (ARIA)	2× Platinum	140,000^{^}
Austria (IFPI Austria)	2× Platinum	60,000^{*}
Belgium (BRMA)	Platinum	30,000^{*}
Denmark (IFPI Danmark)	2× Platinum	180,000^{‡}
France (SNEP)	Gold	150,000^{*}
Germany (BVMI)	3× Platinum	900,000^{‡}
Italy (FIMI)	2× Platinum	200,000^{‡}
New Zealand (RMNZ)	5× Platinum	150,000^{‡}
Portugal (AFP)	Gold	10,000^{‡}
Spain (Promusicae)	Platinum	60,000^{‡}
Sweden (GLF)	2× Platinum	80,000^{‡}
United Kingdom (BPI)	2× Platinum	1,200,000^{‡}
United States (RIAA)	Platinum	1,000,000^{‡}
^{*} Sales figures based on certification alone.^{^} Shipments figures based on certification alone.^{‡} Sales+streaming figures based on certification alone.

== Radio and release history ==
=== Release history ===
Country	Date	Format	Catalogue
France	6 February 2010	CD single	#6280552
Australia	17 February 2010	Digital Download	#6281212
Belgium	17 February 2010	Digital Download	#6281212
Denmark	17 February 2010	Digital Download	#6281212
Finland	17 February 2010	Digital Download	#6281212
France	17 February 2010	Digital Download	#6281212
Ireland	17 February 2010	Digital Download	#6281212
Netherlands	17 February 2010	Digital Download	#6281212
Norway	17 February 2010	Digital Download	#6281212
Spain	17 February 2010	Digital Download	#6281212
Sweden	17 February 2010	Digital Download	#6281212
Switzerland	17 February 2010	Digital Download	#6281212
Australia	29 March 2010	CD Single	#6335431
Belgium	29 March 2010	CD Single	#6335431
Denmark	29 March 2010	CD Single	#6335431
Ireland	29 March 2010	CD Single	#6335431
Netherlands	29 March 2010	CD Single	#6335431
Norway	29 March 2010	CD Single	#6335431
Spain	29 March 2010	CD Single	#6335431
Sweden	29 March 2010	CD Single	#6335431
Switzerland	29 March 2010	CD Single	#6335431
United States	29 March 2010	CD Single	#6335431
France	30 March 2010	CD Single	#6335431
United Kingdom	4 April 2010	CD Single	#6335431
Various	8 January 2021	Digital download (2021 remix)	—N/a

=== Radio history ===
Country	Date
United States	19 October 2010

== See also ==
- List of Polish Dance Chart number-one singles of 2010
