= I Wanna Go Crazy =

Promotional single by David Guetta featuring will.i.am

from the album One Love
- Released: 24 August 2009
- Genre: Electro house
- Length: 3:30
- Label: Virgin; EMI
- Songwriter(s): David Guetta; Jean-Claude Sindres; Sandy Vee; William Adams
- Producer(s): David Guetta; Jean-Claude Sindres; Sandy Vee

"I Wanna Go Crazy" is a song recorded by French disc jockey, David Guetta. It features guest vocals by American rapper, will.i.am from The Black Eyed Peas and was released digitally on 24 August 2009 worldwide. It also appeared on Guetta's fourth studio album, One Love.

== Track listing ==
Digital download
No.	Title	Length
1.	"I Wanna Go Crazy" (featuring will.i.am)	3:24

== Chart performance ==
Chart (2009)	Peak position
Canadian Hot 100	83
UK Singles Chart	92

== Release history ==
Country	Release date	Format	Label
France	7 August 2010	Digital download	Virgin, EMI
