= Who's That Chick? =

2010 single by David Guetta

Single by David Guetta featuring Rihanna

from the album One More Love
- Released: 22 November 2010
- Recorded: 2010
- Genre: Dance-pop
- Length: 2:47 (single version); 3:20 (album version)
- Label: Virgin
- Songwriters: David Guetta; Kinda "Kee" Hamid; Patrick Leonard; Madonna; Frédéric Riesterer; Giorgio Tuinfort
- Producers: David Guetta; Giorgio Tuinfort; Frédéric Riesterer

David Guetta singles chronology
"Club Can't Handle Me" (2010)	"Who's That Chick?" (2010)	"Sweat" (2011)

Rihanna singles chronology
"What's My Name?" (2010)	"Who's That Chick?" (2010)	"Raining Men" (2010)

Music videos
- "Who's That Chick?" (Day version) on YouTube; "Who's That Chick?" (Night version) on YouTube

"Who's That Chick?" is a song by French DJ and record producer David Guetta featuring vocals from Barbadian singer Rihanna. It was released from the reissue of Guetta's fourth studio album One Love (2009), entitled One More Love (2010). The song was written by Guetta, Kinda "Kee" Hamid, Frédéric Riesterer, and Giorgio Tuinfort. Since the song contains an interpolation of "Who's That Girl", Madonna and Patrick Leonard are credited as co-writers as well. It was released internationally as the second single on 22 November 2010 as a digital single, and was also released as a CD single and an Extended play (EP), the latter of which was released in the United States and contained remixes of the song.

Guetta was asked to produce songs for Rihanna's fifth studio album, Loud (2010). After he brainstormed ideas, Guetta conceptualised "Who's That Chick?" and played the demo recording to Rihanna backstage at one of her Last Girl on Earth concerts. In an interview with MTV News, Guetta revealed that he thought Rihanna did not like the song on first impressions, but was honoured when she agreed to record it. It was confirmed at a later date by Rihanna that the song would not appear on Loud's final track list, and that it would instead be included on the re-release of Guetta's One Love, in which Rihanna appeared as a featured artist. "Who's That Chick?" is a dance-pop song and instrumentation consists of synthesizers.

"Who's That Chick?" received positive reviews from music critics, the majority of whom praised the collaboration between Guetta and Rihanna as well as its composition. It was described as one of the more interesting songs to be released in 2010, due to how the song was connected to multiple projects, including a promotional campaign with Doritos and both artist's albums. The song achieved moderate chart success; it peaked at number one on the Wallonia singles chart in Belgium, Slovakia, the UK Dance Chart and the US Dance Club Songs chart. It attained top five positions on the singles charts in Austria, Finland, France, Ireland, Norway, Spain and Switzerland. It was less successful on the US Billboard Hot 100 chart, where it peaked at number 51. Two accompanying music videos were directed by Jonas Åkerlund. A bright and colourful daytime version was shot and used to promote the Doritos campaign, whilst a more dark and sinister nighttime version was shot as the song's official music video.

== Background ==
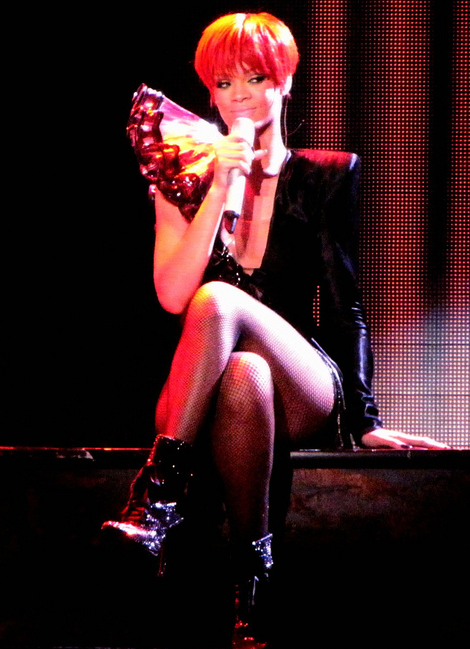
Rihanna appears as a featured artist on David Guetta's "Who's That Chick?".

"Who's That Chick?" was written by David Guetta, Kinda "Kee" Hamid, Patrick Leonard, Madonna, Frédéric Riesterer and Giorgio Tuinfort. The song interpolates Madonna's 1987 single "Who's That Girl", written by Madonna and Patrick Leonard, hence being credited as co-writers. Production of the song was helmed by Guetta, Riesterer and Tuinfort. In an interview with Akshay Bhansali for MTV News, Guetta explained that the song was originally intended for inclusion on Rihanna's fifth studio album, Loud (2010), but that he decided to include it on the re-release of his own album, One Love (2009), when it did not make Loud's final cut. Guetta revealed that he was asked to produce tracks for Loud, but did not have anything which he felt would compliment Rihanna. He stated that although two artists want to collaborate and are fans of each other, it does not always come to fruition. However, after brainstorming ideas for what he could produce for the singer, Guetta came up with an idea for a song called "Who's That Chick?", and decided that it was "perfect" for Rihanna.

After he completed the demo, he pre-viewed the song's instrumental on a French radio station, but did not confirm which artist would contribute vocals. Guetta played the song to Rihanna whilst backstage at one of her Last Girl on Earth (2010–2011) concerts, to which Rihanna said "Yeah, I like it." Guetta confessed that he felt as though the singer did not like it on first impressions and doubted it, but stated that after the concert, the singer told Guetta that she could not stop thinking about the song's beat whilst she performed, and asked to record it. The final cut of the song was included on One More Love (2010) and Rihanna appeared as a featured artist. Guetta concluded the interview by saying that he felt "honored" to have worked with Rihanna. Prior to the release of Loud, Rihanna clarified via Twitter that "Who's That Chick?" was not linked to Loud and that it would not appear on the album.

== Composition ==
"Who's That Chick?"
The audio sample of "Who's That Chick?" presents the use of Auto-Tune effect on Rihanna's vocals.

"Who's That Chick?" is a dance-pop song, which lasts for 2:47 (2 minutes, 47 seconds) on the radio edit. Instrumentation consists of pounding synthesizers. Rihanna's vocals on the song are technologically processed using the Auto-Tune effect. For the first verse, she "hollers" the lyrics "Feel the adrenaline/ Moving under my skin/ It's an addiction" over the heavy synth beat. During the chorus, Rihanna sings "She's been a crazy dita/ Disco diva, and you wonder/ Who's that chick? Who's that chick?/ Too cold for you to keep her/ Too hot for you to leave her/ Who's that chick? Who's that chick?", which incorporates heavy usage of Auto-Tune. Robert Copsey for Digital Spy described Rihanna's vocal performance as "nonchalant vocals feeling colder than an ice pop on a snowy day".

== Release ==
"Who's That Chick?" was made available to download digitally in Australia, certain territories in Europe and the United States on 22 November 2010. In Germany, it was also released as a CD single on 26 November 2010; it included the original version of "Who's That Chick?" as well as an FMIF! remix of the song. In the United Kingdom, the song was released as a CD single on 28 November 2010. In the US, an extended play (EP) was released on 7 January 2011; it included a radio edit of the song, a remix by Adam F., as well as extended and instrumental versions.

In February 2011, Virgin/EMI label executives asked European radio stations to remove "Who's That Chick?" from their playlists because Rihanna had multiple songs on the chart. Due to how Rihanna's Loud was released at the same time as Guetta's album, label executives asked radio stations to favor her work instead. In an interview for the Daily Star, Guetta addressed the song being removed from European radio stations playlists, saying "My record label sent letters to all the radio stations asking them to stop playing Who's That Chick as Rihanna's album was out at the same time. It was strange because normally record labels ask radio stations to play your music."

== Critical reception ==
Robert Copsey of Digital Spy described the collaboration as one of the more confusing releases of 2010, due to how the song was connected to three different projects, including the Doritos campaign and both Guetta's and Rihanna's albums. Copsey praised Guetta's ability to provide a "proper dance-pop stonker" and was complimentary of its composition. He concluded his reviewing with "It's a good job, then, that bopping along to this – and warming yourself up in the process – is pretty much impossible to resist." A reviewer for Popjustice was divided on the song's lyrics; though he found the line "beating like a disco drum" fantastic, he remained unconvinced by the line, "who's that chick", which he labelled as being stupid. Becky Bain for Idolator criticized the song for sounding "generic" and compared it to Katy Perry's releases "California Gurls" and "Teenage Dream" (2010). Tom Byron for The Vine compared the song to Australian singer Guy Sebastian's "Who's That Girl" (2010) and Madonna's "Who's That Girl" (1987).

== Chart performance ==
"Who's That Chick?" achieved moderate chart success around the world. In Australia, it debuted at number 36 on 5 December 2010, and peaked at number seven in its eighth week on the singles chart. It was certified double platinum by the Australian Recording Industry Association (ARIA), denoting shipments of 140,000 units. In New Zealand, the song debuted at 28 on 28 November 2010, and peaked at number eight for two consecutive weeks 10 January 2011. The song was certified platinum by the Recording Industry Association of New Zealand (RIANZ), denoting sales of 15,000 copies.

In Europe, "Who's That Chick?" debuted at number nine on the singles chart in the Wallonia region of Belgium on 12 December 2010 and peaked at number on the singles chart in its seventh week on 15 January 2011. It was certified gold by the Belgian Entertainment Association (BEA), denoting sales of 10,000 copies. The song peaked at number four in Austria on 12 December 2010. It debuted at number 11 in Finland on 29 November 2010, and peaked at number five two weeks later. In France, "Who's That Chick?" debuted at number six on January 29, 2011, where it remained in its second week. The song peaked at number five in its third week, where it remained for a further two weeks. The song debuted and peaked at number five in Norway on 29 November 2010, and remained in the top ten for three more weeks. In Spain, the song debuted at number 11 on 28 November 2010, and peaked at number five in its tenth week after fluctuating within the top twenty. The song was certified by the Productores de Música de España (PROMUSICAE), denoting sales of 20,000 copies. The track was certified gold by the Bundesverband Musikindustrie (BVMI), denoting shipments of 150,000 copies. The song was less successful in Sweden and The Netherlands, where it peaked at numbers 14 and 16, respectively.

In the United Kingdom, "Who's That Chick?" debuted at number nine on the UK Singles Chart on 11 December 2010. In the same chart issue, two other songs by Rihanna were also in the top ten, "Only Girl (In the World)" and "What's My Name", which charted at numbers seven and eight, respectively. With this feat, Rihanna became the fourth act in UK chart history to have at least three songs in the top ten of the UK Singles Chart. "Who's That Chick?" peaked at number six on 22 January 2011. It reached number one on the UK Dance Chart in January 2011. The song was certified double platinum by the British Phonographic Industry (BPI) denoting shipments of 1,200,000 units. "Who's That Chick?" peaked at number 51 on the US Billboard Hot 100 chart on 29 January 2011, and remained on the chart for seven weeks. It peaked at number one on the Dance Club Songs chart and number 33 on the Mainstream Top 40 chart. "Who's That Chick?" ranked at number four on the top 50 best-selling Dance/Clubs Songs of 2011.

== Music videos ==
=== Background ===
The screenshot shows Guetta in his spaceship scenes and Rihanna in the daytime video.

Although "Who's That Chick?" was originally intended for inclusion on Rihanna's fifth studio album Loud, the song's accompanying daytime video was used as part of Doritos Late Night Campaign. Jonas Åkerlund directed both daytime and nighttime versions for the song, which featured different colors and styles. The daytime video leaked onto the Internet on 17 September 2010, before it was given an official release. In a press statement given by Rihanna, the singer revealed how she was excited to work with Doritos on the project, saying: "I'm really excited about 'Who's That Chick?' and wanted to find a fresh and unique way to share it with my fans ... When I saw how cool the augmented reality performance Doritos created was, I knew this was it. This was the way I wanted to make 'Who's That Chick?' available to the world, and I can't wait to see how my fans get engaged in this innovative experience."

In an interview for Just Jared, Rihanna explained how the bright and colorful was more representational of her persona, saying "I've started to incorporate a lot of different colors into my wardrobe now. I'm loving that direction. Right now, it feels good and right. It was a cool concept too because it was kind of one side of me and now, it's evolving into the new colorful stuff that we've been doing." In an interview for MTV News, Guetta explained his role in the music video, saying "I'm DJing from a spaceship. It's actually really funny, because we shot that in Los Angeles in a place where they used to shoot Star Trek, but like the old ones. And so it's kind of retro futuristic, you know? It's like how people were seeing the future back in the 80s. It has a sense of humor in the video." The nighttime version was released as the song's official music video to download digitally on 1 February 2011.

=== Synopsis and reception ===
Both the daytime and nighttime videos for "Who's That Chick?" are the same, however, the former features Rihanna in a "bright and bubbly" setting while the latter depicts a darker scenario. In the daytime video, Rihanna puts a vinyl record of the song onto a record player, while in the nighttime video, she puts a CD into a CD player. At this moment, the song's audio begins to play. Various video stills of Rihanna sitting down on a chair and surrounded by extras are intermittently shown one after the other. The majority of the video revolves around Rihanna and the extras dancing in a room, while various special effects are incorporated; in the daytime video, Rihanna wears a colorful outfit, and she wears a black outfit in the nighttime video.

In January 2011, both the daytime and nighttime videos were altered to include new footage featuring Guetta. Before the song's audio begins to play, the video begins with a view of outer space before it cuts to what appears to be the interior of a spaceship. Guetta is then shown to step out of an airlock where smoke surrounds him. Different shots of television screens and other spaceship hardware are shown as Guetta begins to observe the singer's actions from a control room.

Rap-Up commented that by having the two different videos, it shows that "every good girl has a bad side." Becky Bain for Idolator described the daytime video as "the super-colorful cheery vid" and the nighttime video as a "macabre Halloween makeover." In another review of the video, Bain wrote that the daytime version presented Rihanna as "having the most fun she's had in ages." Bain continued to praise the creative direction for the video, writing "It's so refreshing to see RiRi smiling and ready to party after her gun-weilding [sic], lake-drowning, loving-the-way-you-lie humorless somber phase." Amy Lee for Metro compared the daytime video's colorful stylization to Katy Perry's video for "California Gurls". Nicole James for MTV Buzzworthy compared the nighttime video's dark persona to that of Rihanna's own for "Disturbia". Chris Ryan for the same publication noted that the daytime video was reminiscent of Rihanna's video for "SOS". Ryan also noted that the video bore similarities to Perry's videos.

== Track listing ==
- Digital download
1. "Who's That Chick?" (single version; featuring Rihanna) – 2:47
- German CD
1. "Who's That Chick?" (album version; featuring Rihanna) – 3:19
2. "Who's That Chick?" (FMIF! remix; featuring Rihanna) – 5:20
- US digital download (EP)
1. "Who's That Chick?" (Adam F remix; featuring Rihanna) – 5:00
2. "Who's That Chick?" (extended version; featuring Rihanna) – 4:35
3. "Who's That Chick?" (instrumental version) – 3:18

== Credits and personnel ==
Adapted from the liner notes.

- Songwriting – Kinda "Kee" Hamid, David Guetta, Giorgio Tuinfort, Frédéric Riesterer, Madonna, Patrick Leonard.
- Production – David Guetta, Giorgio Tuinfort, Frédéric Riesterer
- Mixing – Véronica Ferraro
- Mastering – Bruno Gruel

== Charts ==
=== Weekly charts ===
Weekly chart performance
Chart (2010–11)	Peak position
Australia (ARIA)	7
Austria (Ö3 Austria Top 40)	4
Belgium (Ultratop 50 Flanders)	6
Belgium (Ultratop 50 Wallonia)	1
Brazil (Billboard Brasil Hot 100)	7
Brazil Hot Pop Songs	3
Canada Hot 100 (Billboard)	26
CIS Airplay (TopHit)	33
Croatia International Airplay (HRT)	1
Czech Republic Airplay (ČNS IFPI)	11
Denmark (Tracklisten)	25
Euro Digital Song Sales (Billboard)	3
Finland (Suomen virallinen lista)	5
France (SNEP)	5
Germany (GfK)	6
Hungary (Dance Top 40)	21
Hungary (Rádiós Top 40)	17
Hungary (Single Top 40)	6
Ireland (IRMA)	4
Israel International Airplay (Media Forest)	2
Italy (FIMI)	11
Italy Airplay (EarOne)	57
Netherlands (Dutch Top 40)	6
Netherlands (Single Top 100)	16
New Zealand (Recorded Music NZ)	8
Norway (VG-lista)	5
Russia Airplay (TopHit)	29
Slovakia Airplay (ČNS IFPI)	1
Spain (Promusicae)	5
Sweden (Sverigetopplistan)	14
Switzerland (Schweizer Hitparade)	8
UK Singles (Official Charts)	6
UK Dance (Official Charts)	1
US Billboard Hot 100	51
US Dance Airplay (Billboard)	6
US Dance Club Songs (Billboard)	1
US Pop Airplay (Billboard)	33
US Rhythmic Airplay (Billboard)	33

=== Year-end charts ===
Annual chart rankings
Chart (2010)	Position
Australia (ARIA)	91
Germany (Official German Charts)	90
Sweden (Sverigetopplistan)	100
UK Singles (OCC)	137

Chart (2011)	Position
Australia (ARIA)	58
Austria (Ö3 Austria Top 40)	35
Belgium (Ultratop 50 Flanders)	51
Belgium (Ultratop 50 Wallonia)	19
Canada (Canadian Hot 100)	71
Croatia International Airplay (HRT)	22
France (SNEP)	16
Germany (Official German Charts)	45
Hungary (Rádiós Top 40)	53
Netherlands (Dutch Top 40)	18
Netherlands (Single Top 100)	81
New Zealand (Recorded Music NZ)	44
Russia Airplay (Tophit)	89
Spain (PROMUSICAE)	26
Sweden (Sverigetopplistan)	46
Switzerland (Schweizer Hitparade)	31
UK Singles (OCC)	40
US Dance Club Songs (Billboard)	4

== Certifications and sales ==
Certifications for "Who's That Chick?"
Region	Certification	Certified units/sales
Australia (ARIA)	2× Platinum	140,000^{^}
Austria (IFPI Austria)	Gold	15,000^{*}
Belgium (BRMA)	Gold	15,000^{*}
Denmark (IFPI Danmark)	Gold	45,000^{‡}
Finland (Musiikkituottajat)	Gold	3,083
France	—	155,000
Germany (BVMI)	Gold	150,000^{^}
Italy (FIMI)	Gold	15,000^{*}
New Zealand (RMNZ)	2× Platinum	60,000^{‡}
Spain (Promusicae)	Gold	20,000^{*}
Sweden (GLF)	Platinum	40,000^{‡}
United Kingdom (BPI)	2× Platinum	1,200,000^{‡}
^{*} Sales figures based on certification alone.^{^} Shipments figures based on certification alone.^{‡} Sales+streaming figures based on certification alone.

== Release history ==
Release dates for "Who's That Chick?"
Region	Date	Format(s)	Version(s)	Labels	Ref.
Australia	22 November 2010	Digital download	Single	Virgin; EMI	
Belgium	22 November 2010	Digital download	Single	Virgin; EMI	
Denmark	22 November 2010	Digital download	Single	Virgin; EMI	
Finland	22 November 2010	Digital download	Single	Virgin; EMI	
France	22 November 2010	Digital download	Single	Virgin; EMI	
Germany	22 November 2010	Digital download	Single	Virgin; EMI	
Italy	22 November 2010	Radio airplay	Album/Single	EMI	
Netherlands	22 November 2010	Digital download	Single	Virgin; EMI	
Spain	22 November 2010	Digital download	Single	Virgin; EMI	
Sweden	22 November 2010	Digital download	Single	Virgin; EMI	
United States	22 November 2010	Digital download	Single	Virgin; EMI	
Germany	26 November 2010	CD	Album; FMIF! remix	Virgin; EMI	
United Kingdom	28 November 2010	CD	Album; FMIF! remix	Virgin; EMI	
United States	7 December 2010	Contemporary hit radio; rhythmic contemporary radio	Album/Single	Astralwerks; Capitol	
United States	7 January 2011	Digital download	Adam F remix; extended; instrumental	Virgin; EMI	

== See also ==
- List of UK Dance Singles Chart number ones of 2011
- List of Billboard Dance Club Songs number ones of 2011
