= List of Ultratop 50 number-one singles of 2009 =

These hits topped the Ultratop 50 in 2009.

Date	Title	Artist
3 January	"Home"	Tom Helsen & Geike Arnaert
10 January	"Home"	Tom Helsen & Geike Arnaert
17 January	"Home"	Tom Helsen & Geike Arnaert
24 January	"Home"	Tom Helsen & Geike Arnaert
31 January	"Use Somebody"	Kings of Leon
7 February	"Use Somebody"	Kings of Leon
14 February	"Mijn leven"	Andy Sierens A.K.A. Vijvenveertig featuring Hooverphonic
21 February	"Poker Face"	Lady Gaga
28 February	"Mijn leven"	Andy Sierens A.K.A. Vijvenveertig featuring Hooverphonic
7 March	"Poker Face"	Lady Gaga
14 March	"Poker Face"	Lady Gaga
21 March	"Poker Face"	Lady Gaga
28 March	"Poker Face"	Lady Gaga
4 April	"Poker Face"	Lady Gaga
11 April	"Poker Face"	Lady Gaga
18 April	"Poker Face"	Lady Gaga
25 April	"Poker Face"	Lady Gaga
2 May	"Düm Tek Tek"	Hadise
9 May	"Düm Tek Tek"	Hadise
16 May	"Jungle Drum"	Emiliana Torrini
23 May	"Düm Tek Tek"	Hadise
30 May	"Fairytale"	Alexander Rybak
6 June	"Fuck You"	Lily Allen
13 June	"Fuck You"	Lily Allen
20 June	"Fuck You"	Lily Allen
27 June	"Boom Boom Pow"	The Black Eyed Peas
4 July	"I Know You Want Me (Calle Ocho)"	Pitbull
11 July	"I Know You Want Me (Calle Ocho)"	Pitbull
18 July	"Blackout"	Milk Inc.
25 July	"Blackout"	Milk Inc.
1 August	"I Know You Want Me (Calle Ocho)"	Pitbull
8 August	"I Gotta Feeling"	Black Eyed Peas
15 August	"I Gotta Feeling"	Black Eyed Peas
22 August	"I Gotta Feeling"	Black Eyed Peas
29 August	"I Gotta Feeling"	Black Eyed Peas
5 September	"I Gotta Feeling"	Black Eyed Peas
12 September	"I Gotta Feeling"	Black Eyed Peas
19 September	"I Gotta Feeling"	Black Eyed Peas
26 September	"I Gotta Feeling"	Black Eyed Peas
3 October	"Sexy Bitch"	David Guetta featuring Akon
10 October	"Papillon"	Editors
17 October	"MaMaSé!"	K3
24 October	"MaMaSé!"	K3
31 October	"MaMaSé!"	K3
7 November	"MaMaSé!"	K3
14 November	"MaMaSé!"	K3
21 November	"MaMaSé!"	K3
28 November	"MaMaSé!"	K3
5 December	"Meet Me Halfway"	Black Eyed Peas
12 December	"Meet Me Halfway"	Black Eyed Peas
19 December	"Meet Me Halfway"	Black Eyed Peas
26 December	"Meet Me Halfway"	Black Eyed Peas

== See also ==
- List of Ultratop 40 number-one hits of 2009

== Notes ==
1. Turkish entry to the 2009 Eurovision Song Contest
2. Winner of 2009 Eurovision Song Contest
