= Airi L =

British singer

Airi L is a female vocalist who had a hit in the UK with a pre-release cover version of "When Love Takes Over" by David Guetta featuring Kelly Rowland. Airi L's version got to 22 in the UK Singles Chart.

The release of this track prompted the rush release of the original version of the track. EMI Music called Airi L's version "inferior" and decided to combat her cover by releasing Guetta's version on 11 June 2009, earlier than originally planned. The cover debuted and peaked at number twenty-two, selling 12,000 copies whilst Guetta and Rowland's version debuted at number seven with 25,000 copies. According to Yahoo! Music's James Masterton, Rowland's version would have debuted at a higher place had it not been for the "bootleg cover". He said the single had to be rush released "when not one but two spoiler (and indeed near-identical) cover versions started to race up the iTunes rankings and threatened to have a negatively impact on the 'official' version." The following week Guetta's version peaked at number one, whereas the Airi L cover fell to 177.

The Airi L cover of "When Love Takes Over" was one of many cover versions released as downloads under the "Power Music Workout" umbrella. Airi L has recorded cover versions of various other tracks including "All Dressed in Love", "Boyfriend", "Confessions of a Broken Heart (Daughter to Father)", "I Will Survive", "No Air", "No More Tears (Enough Is Enough)", "On The Radio", "Rhythm Is A Dancer", "Single Ladies (Put A Ring on It)" and "Spotlight".
