= Grrrr (song) =

2009 single by David Guetta

Single by David Guetta

from the album Fuck Me I'm Famous - Ibiza Mix 2009
- Released: September 9, 2009
- Length: 7:26
- Label: Toolroom Records
- Songwriters: David Guetta, Frédéric Riesterer

David Guetta singles chronology
"Sexy Bitch" (2009)	"Grrrr" (2009)	"One Love" (2009)

"Grrrr" (stylised as "GRRRR") is an instrumental house song performed by French DJ David Guetta. It was released as the lead single from Guetta's compilation album, Fuck Me I'm Famous - Ibiza Mix 2009 and also appears on the deluxe edition of One Love, entitled One More Love.

== Charts ==
Chart (2009)	Peak position
Belgium (Ultratop 50 Flanders)	8
Belgium (Ultratop 50 Wallonia)	4
UK Singles (OCC)	88
