= List of Ultratop 40 number-one singles of 2009 =

This is a list of songs that topped the Belgian Walloon (francophone) Ultratop 40 in 2009.

Issue date	Song title	Artist
January 3	"Toi + Moi"	Grégoire
January 10	"Toi + Moi"	Grégoire
January 17	"Toi + Moi"	Grégoire
January 24	"Toi + Moi"	Grégoire
January 31	"Hot n Cold"	Katy Perry
February 7	"Hot n Cold"	Katy Perry
February 14	"Poker Face"	Lady Gaga
February 21	"Poker Face"	Lady Gaga
February 28	"Poker Face"	Lady Gaga
March 7	"Poker Face"	Lady Gaga
March 14	"Poker Face"	Lady Gaga
March 21	"Poker Face"	Lady Gaga
March 28	"Ici les Enfoirés"	Les Enfoirés
April 4	"Poker Face"	Lady Gaga
April 11	"Poker Face"	Lady Gaga
April 18	"Poker Face"	Lady Gaga
April 25	"Right Round"	Flo Rida featuring Ke$ha
May 2	"Broken Strings"	James Morrison featuring Nelly Furtado
May 9	"C'est dit"	Calogero
May 16	"C'est dit"	Calogero
May 23	"C'est dit"	Calogero
May 30	"Boom Boom Pow"	The Black Eyed Peas
June 6	"Boom Boom Pow"	The Black Eyed Peas
June 13	"Boom Boom Pow"	The Black Eyed Peas
June 20	"Boom Boom Pow"	The Black Eyed Peas
June 27	"Boom Boom Pow"	The Black Eyed Peas
July 4	"When Love Takes Over"	David Guetta featuring Kelly Rowland
July 11	"When Love Takes Over"	David Guetta featuring Kelly Rowland
July 18	"When Love Takes Over"	David Guetta featuring Kelly Rowland
July 25	"When Love Takes Over"	David Guetta featuring Kelly Rowland
August 1	"I Gotta Feeling"	The Black Eyed Peas
August 8	"I Gotta Feeling"	The Black Eyed Peas
August 15	"I Gotta Feeling"	The Black Eyed Peas
August 22	"I Gotta Feeling"	The Black Eyed Peas
August 29	"I Gotta Feeling"	The Black Eyed Peas
September 5	"Sexy Bitch"	David Guetta featuring Akon
September 12	"I Gotta Feeling"	Black Eyed Peas
September 19	"Sexy Bitch"	David Guetta featuring Akon
September 26	"I Gotta Feeling"	Black Eyed Peas
October 3	"Alors on danse"	Stromae
October 10	"Alors on danse"	Stromae
October 17	"Alors on danse"	Stromae
October 24	"Alors on danse"	Stromae
October 31	"Alors on danse"	Stromae
November 7	"I Gotta Feeling"	Black Eyed Peas
November 14	"Sexy Bitch"	David Guetta featuring Akon
November 21	"Meet Me Halfway"	The Black Eyed Peas
November 28	"Meet Me Halfway"	The Black Eyed Peas
December 5	"We Are The Best"	The Champions
December 12	"We Are The Best"	The Champions
December 19	"We Are The Best"	The Champions
December 26	"Meet Me Halfway"	The Black Eyed Peas

== See also ==
- List of Ultratop 50 number-one hits of 2009
