= Meet Me Halfway =

2009 single by the Black Eyed Peas

Single by Black Eyed Peas

from the album The E.N.D.
- Released: September 22, 2009
- Genre: Dance-pop; synth-pop
- Length: 4:44 (album); 3:45 (radio edit)
- Label: Interscope
- Songwriters: William Adams; Jean Baptiste; Stacy Ferguson; Jaime Gomez; Sylvia Gordon; Keith Harris; Allan Lindo
- Producers: will.i.am; Keith Harris

Black Eyed Peas singles chronology
"I Gotta Feeling" (2009)	"Meet Me Halfway" (2009)	"Imma Be" (2010)

Audio sample
- file; help

Music video
- "Meet Me Halfway" on YouTube

"Meet Me Halfway" is the third single from the Black Eyed Peas' fifth studio album, The E.N.D. (2009). Released in September 2009, the song peaked at number seven on the US Billboard Hot 100 and topped the charts of Australia, Germany, Romania, Mexico, and the United Kingdom where "Meet Me Halfway" became the 10th-biggest-selling single of 2009.

== Background ==
"Meet Me Halfway" samples a drum beat and guitar riff from Yeah Yeah Yeahs's 2003 single, "Maps". The song was released as a promotional single, as part of the "Countdown to The E.N.D." where 3 album tracks were released once each week until the release of the album. This song was the final promotional single in the series, the first two, in order of release, were "Imma Be" and "Alive". The song got early airplay on Today Networks' Hot30 Countdown in Australia, and on radio stations across Canada.

== Promotion ==
"Meet Me Halfway" was performed live on the week 5 results show of the British TV singing competition The X Factor on November 8, 2009. The single was released the previous week in the UK. They performed the song on the American Music Awards of 2009, along with "Boom Boom Pow". The Black Eyed Peas performed the mix of the song at the 2009 Victoria's Secret Fashion Show.

== Critical reception ==
The song received generally positive reviews from music critics. Prefix magazine stated, "Meet Me Halfway is notable mostly for being better than a 'new-wavey' ballad by The Black Eyed Peas has any right to be." Billboard wrote "Fergie elongates each note for a sensual vocal and offers a nice complement to co-producer Will.i.am, who handles the majority of the rhymes over funk guitar, hand claps and distorted pulses. With this track already climbing the Hot 100, the Peas are proving that their hit parade is far from over."

Bill Lamb of About.com stated that: "Fergie has the clear lead vocal here. She will never blow someone away with a bombastic voice or an otherworldly vocal range. However, she has an almost tearful edge to her voice that makes nearly any of her performances sound soaked with emotion. "Meet Me Halfway" is no exception. With the focus clearly on Fergie, this could in some ways be seen as a solo effort. However, the style of the song fits better in the context of The Black Eyed Peas album The E.N.D. instead of Fergie's The Dutchess." Entertainment Weekly also gave a positive review: "When the group's glitchy future-funk beats sync up with Fergie's unabashedly feminine melodies, as on the sweetly insidious Meet Me Halfway, they find pure Top 40 nirvana."

== Chart performance ==
The song debuted on the Billboard Hot 100 chart at number 75 for the week ending October 3, 2009, and peaked at number seven during its sixth week (November 7), becoming the third consecutive top ten hit from the album. It makes The E.N.D. the band's first album to contain three Hot 100 top ten hits. The three songs successively overlapped in the Top 10, giving the group 30 consecutive weeks with a Top 10 hit. It topped the ARIA charts, becoming their third consecutive number 1 single from The E.N.D.

In the United Kingdom, "Meet Me Halfway" entered the UK Singles Chart on October 11, 2009, at number 67. In its fifth week on the chart (November 8, 2009) it climbed to number three, being the highest non-X Factor related song on the chart, and one of only two songs in the top five non-related to The X Factor, along with Jay Sean's "Down", although The Black Eyed Peas performed "Meet Me Halfway" on the X Factor results show on the same night, leading to significant exposure. On November 13, it was announced that "Meet Me Halfway" was outselling its nearest competition, "Happy" by Leona Lewis, and was on course to reach number one. It became The E.N.D.'s third consecutive number one single in Britain, and the band's fourth overall, on November 15, 2009, achieving the same success as in Australia. As of Sunday December 27, "Meet Me Halfway" has sold 517,178 copies in Britain, making it the 13th best selling single of 2009. On December 20, "Meet Me Halfway" fell to number 10 after eight consecutive weeks but rose to number six the following week. As on January 3, 2010, it rose again to number three.

On the New Zealand Top 40, the song peaked at number three, making it their third consecutive top three hit from the album. It was certified Gold after 10 weeks on the chart, selling over 7,500 copies. The song entered the Irish Singles Chart on October 15, 2009, at number 27, it has so far peaked at number 2 for five consecutive weeks, fended off by Cheryl Cole's "Fight For This Love", the X Factor finalists' cover of "You Are Not Alone" and finally Lady Gaga's "Bad Romance". The song also reached number one on the German Single Charts, making it their third chart topper since almost 5 years (last two were "Where Is the Love?" and "Shut Up" – both in 2003).

== Music video ==
Fergie is shown in a luxuriant forest

The music video was confirmed by will.i.am to be directed by Ben Mor (director of "I Gotta Feeling"). "This is a very different type of video ... 'Boom Boom Pow' was very futuristic and 'I Gotta Feeling' had a party vibe, but this is more artistic video. It's very arty". The video premiered on October 12, 2009. It was released onto the iTunes Music store on October 13, 2009.

The video features the members in different parts of the Solar System. The video opens on a road in the middle of a desert panning up to the cosmic sky which shifts to scenes of each of the members singing in different locations of space: Fergie (in an Alberta Ferretti dress from fall 2004) lies in the middle of a lush, green jungle, apl.de.ap levitates on a desert planet in nomadic clothing, will.i.am rides an elephant on a moon of Jupiter and Taboo glides around the Sun in a spacesuit. Apl takes out a map and will.i.am uses a compass to search for a path to the other members. After a while, will.i.am finds a dial that reveals gateways for each of the members to go through. All the members use a stargate and turn into shooting stars, and land on the planet (presumably Earth because it is a mix of all the different places were the singers are and is a halfway of all the locations in the video), with the road in the middle of the desert. This is the first video of the album that does not end with the phrase "The E.N.D."

== Covers ==
In May 2010, two members of the British hip-hop trio, N-Dubz performed an acoustic mash-up of the song with "Down" by Jay Sean at Live Lounge with singer Ny, as the third member Tulisa was ill, the full trio later performed the acoustic mash-up at Isle of Wight Festival and later on their Love.Live.Life Tour. In June 2010, metalcore band Haste the Day released a cover of the song on the special edition of their final studio album, Attack of the Wolf King. In 2012, a cover of "Meet Me Halfway" featured on The Futureheads a capella album Rant.

== Track listing ==
UK CD Single (2721563)

No.	Title	Length
1.	"Meet Me Halfway" (Radio Edit)	3:44
2.	"I Gotta Feeling" (David Guetta's FMIF Remix)	6:13
Total length:		7:50

Digital Download E.P.

No.	Title	Length
1.	"Meet Me Halfway" (DJ Ammo & A Poet Named Life Remix)	5:25
2.	"Meet Me Halfway" (will.i.am Meet Me At The Remix)	5:49
3.	"Meet Me Halfway" (will.i.am In 3D Remix)	5:40
4.	"Meet Me Halfway" (Printz Board Remix for Beets & Produce, Inc.)	5:21
5.	"Meet Me Halfway" (Richard Vission Solmatic Remix)	5:30
Total length:		27:45

== Credits and personnel ==
Source adapted from Discogs.

- Bass [Synth Bass] – Printz Board
- Guitar [Guitars By] – George Pajon, Tim "Izo" Orindgreff
- Keyboards [Keys], Synthesizer [Synths], Bass Guitar, Drum Programming – Keith Harris
- Written-By – William Adams, Allan Pineda, Jaime Gomez, Stacy Ferguson, Jean Baptiste, Keith Harris, Sylvia Gordon
- Vocals – will.i.am, Fergie, Taboo, apl.de.ap
- Recorded at: Metropolis Studios in London, UK
- Management: David Sonenberg and William Derella for DAS Communications, Ltd. and Polo Molina for Grass Roots Productions, Inc

== Charts ==
=== Weekly charts ===
Weekly chart performance for "Meet Me Halfway"
Chart (2009–2010)	Peak position
Australia (ARIA)	1
Austria (Ö3 Austria Top 40)	4
Belgium (Ultratop 50 Flanders)	1
Belgium (Ultratop 50 Wallonia)	1
Belgian Airplay (Ultratop Wallonia)	1
Canada Hot 100 (Billboard)	5
CIS (TopHit)	10
Czech Republic Airplay (ČNS IFPI)	2
Denmark (Tracklisten)	9
European Hot 100 Singles (Billboard)	1
Finland (Suomen virallinen lista)	16
France (SNEP)	3
Germany (GfK)	1
Greece (IFPI)	1
Hungary (Dance Top 40)	16
Hungary (Rádiós Top 40)	4
Ireland (IRMA)	2
Israel International Airplay (Media Forest)	1
Italy (FIMI)	2
Italy Airplay (EarOne)	1
Luxembourg Digital Songs (Billboard)	1
Mexico Anglo (Monitor Latino)	3
Netherlands (Dutch Top 40)	3
Netherlands (Single Top 100)	5
New Zealand (Recorded Music NZ)	3
Norway (VG-lista)	1
Poland (Polish Airplay Chart)	2
Poland Dance (ZPAV)	6
Portugal Digital Song Sales (Billboard)	2
Romania (Romanian Top 100)	1
Russia Airplay (TopHit)	7
Scottish Singles Sales (Official Charts)	1
Slovakia Airplay (ČNS IFPI)	5
Spain (Promusicae)	5
Spain Airplay (PROMUSICAE)	2
Sweden (Sverigetopplistan)	5
Switzerland (Schweizer Hitparade)	3
UK Singles (Official Charts)	1
UK Hip Hop/R&B (Official Charts)	1
US Billboard Hot 100	7
US Dance Club Songs (Billboard)	17
US Pop Airplay (Billboard)	10
US Rhythmic Airplay (Billboard)	9

=== Year-end charts ===
Chart (2009)	Position
Australia (ARIA)	8
Belgium (Ultratop 50 Flanders)	55
Belgium (Ultratop 50 Wallonia)	37
Brazil (Crowley)	66
Canada (Canadian Hot 100)	75
Germany (Media Control GfK)	69
Hungary (Rádiós Top 40)	148
Netherlands (Dutch Top 40)	63
Netherlands (Single Top 100)	82
New Zealand (Recorded Music NZ)	28
Switzerland (Schweizer Hitparade)	95
UK Singles (Official Charts)	10

Chart (2010)	Position
Australia (ARIA)	98
Austria (Ö3 Austria Top 40)	22
Belgium (Ultratop 50 Flanders)	19
Belgium (Ultratop 50 Wallonia)	11
Brazil (Crowley)	49
Canada (Canadian Hot 100)	39
CIS (TopHit)	60
European Hot 100 Singles (Billboard)	3
France (SNEP)	29
Germany (Media Control GfK)	30
Hungary (Dance Top 40)	53
Hungary (Rádiós Top 40)	11
Italy (FIMI)	16
Italy Airplay (EarOne)	43
Netherlands (Dutch Top 40)	79
Romania (Romanian Top 100)	34
Russia Airplay (TopHit)	49
Spain (PROMUSICAE)	18
Spain Airplay (PROMUSICAE)	4
Sweden (Sverigetopplistan)	60
Switzerland (Schweizer Hitparade)	32
UK Singles (Official Charts)	103
US Billboard Hot 100	58

=== Decade-end charts ===
Chart (2000–2009)	Position
Australia (ARIA)	40

== Certifications ==
Certifications and sales
Region	Certification	Certified units/sales
Australia (ARIA)	3× Platinum	210,000^{^}
Belgium (BRMA)	2× Platinum	60,000^{*}
Brazil (Pro-Música Brasil)	2× Platinum	120,000^{‡}
Canada (Music Canada)	2× Platinum	160,000^{*}
Denmark (IFPI Danmark)	Platinum	90,000^{‡}
France (SNEP)	Diamond	333,333^{‡}
Germany (BVMI)	Platinum	300,000^{‡}
Italy (FIMI)	Platinum	30,000^{*}
New Zealand (RMNZ)	4× Platinum	120,000^{‡}
Spain (Promusicae)	Platinum	40,000^{*}
Switzerland (IFPI Switzerland)	Gold	15,000^{^}
United Kingdom (BPI)	3× Platinum	1,800,000^{‡}
United States (RIAA)	5× Platinum	5,000,000^{‡}
^{*} Sales figures based on certification alone.^{^} Shipments figures based on certification alone.^{‡} Sales+streaming figures based on certification alone.

== Release history ==
Release dates and formats
Region	Date	Format	Label	Ref.
United States	September 22, 2009	Contemporary hit radio	Interscope	
Australia	October 2, 2009	CD	Universal	
United Kingdom	November 2, 2009	CD	Polydor	
Italy	November 13, 2009	Radio airplay	Universal	
United States	November 17, 2009	Digital download (EP)	Interscope	
Germany	November 20, 2009	CD	Universal	
France	November 23, 2009	CD	Polydor	

== See also ==
- List of number-one singles in Australia in 2009
- List of number-one singles from the 2000s (UK)
- List of number-one R&B hits of 2009 (UK)
- List of European number-one hits of 2009
- List of number-one hits of 2009 (Germany)
- List of Romanian Top 100 number ones of the 2000s
- List of Ultratop 40 number-one hits of 2009
- List of Ultratop 50 number-one hits of 2009
