= When Love Takes Over =

2009 single by David Guetta featuring Kelly Rowland

Single by David Guetta featuring Kelly Rowland

from the album One Love
- Released: 21 April 2009
- Recorded: 2008–09
- Studio: Gum Prod (Paris, France)
- Genre: Synth-pop; dance-pop
- Length: 3:10 (album/video version); 3:24 (UK radio edit)
- Label: Virgin; EMI
- Songwriters: David Guetta; Miriam Nervo; Olivia Nervo; Kelly Rowland; Frédéric Riesterer
- Producers: David Guetta; Frédéric Riesterer

David Guetta singles chronology
| "Everytime We Touch" (2009) | "When Love Takes Over" (2009) | "Sexy Bitch" (2009) |

Kelly Rowland singles chronology
| "Breathe Gentle" (2009) | "When Love Takes Over" (2009) | "Commander" (2010) |

Music video
- "When Love Takes Over" on YouTube

"When Love Takes Over" is a song by French DJ and record producer David Guetta featuring vocals by American singer Kelly Rowland, from Guetta's fourth studio album, One Love (2009). It was released as the lead single from the album on 21 April 2009 by Virgin Records (EMI France). The song was conceived when Rowland watched Guetta playing the instrumental version during one of his DJ sets in summer 2008; she fell in love with the track and convinced Guetta to allow her to take it so that she could write and record vocals for it. It was also co-written by Nervo.

According to Rowland, the song inspired her to pursue a more dance-oriented sound for her album Here I Am (2011), while Guetta credited "When Love Takes Over" for providing the framework for his future musical explorations and inspiring him to experiment with more urban sounds. Guetta and Frédéric Riesterer produced the song with piano riffs and a melodic backing track. Veronica Ferraro mixed the song, focusing primarily on giving Rowland's vocals a magical and inspiring tone. Critics would later state that Rowland's vocals on "When Love Takes Over" helped to further establish the singer as a soloist. The song's lyrics carry a message of the euphoria one feels when in love with a significant other, while the production bears some similarities to Coldplay's 2002 hit single "Clocks".

"When Love Takes Over" received critical acclaim. Most noted the addition of Rowland's powerful and emotionally charged vocals which made the single the most memorable song from One Love. The song was praised for its lush production and euphoric sentiments. It achieved worldwide success by topping the charts in ten countries, including in the United Kingdom, Republic of Ireland, Italy and Switzerland. At the time of release, it became Guetta's highest-charting single on the U.S. Billboard Hot 100 and Rowland's second number one single in the United Kingdom. "When Love Takes Over" ranked at number one on Billboard's Best of 2009 Dance Club Songs chart. In 2013, Billboard named "When Love Takes Over" its number one dance-pop collaboration of all time, in addition to noting the lasting cultural impact that the collaboration would have on dance music and its indication of the emerging electronic dance music trend in America at its time of release.

In the song's accompanying music video, Rowland and Guetta reminisce about how the song came together. It follows the duo as they prepare for a party before coming together for the final result. "When Love Takes Over" was promoted mainly at award shows, including the MTV Latin Music Video Awards, NRJ Music Awards and the World Music Awards. Guetta and Rowland reunited in late 2009 to perform "When Love Takes Over" for the annual Miss Universe competition. The single earned several Platinum and Gold certifications, selling over 5.5 million copies worldwide. Additionally, it earned Guetta two Grammy Award nominations for "Best Dance Recording" and "Best Non-Classical, Remixed Recording", the latter of which Guetta won for his "Electro Extended Mix" of "When Love Takes Over".

== Background ==
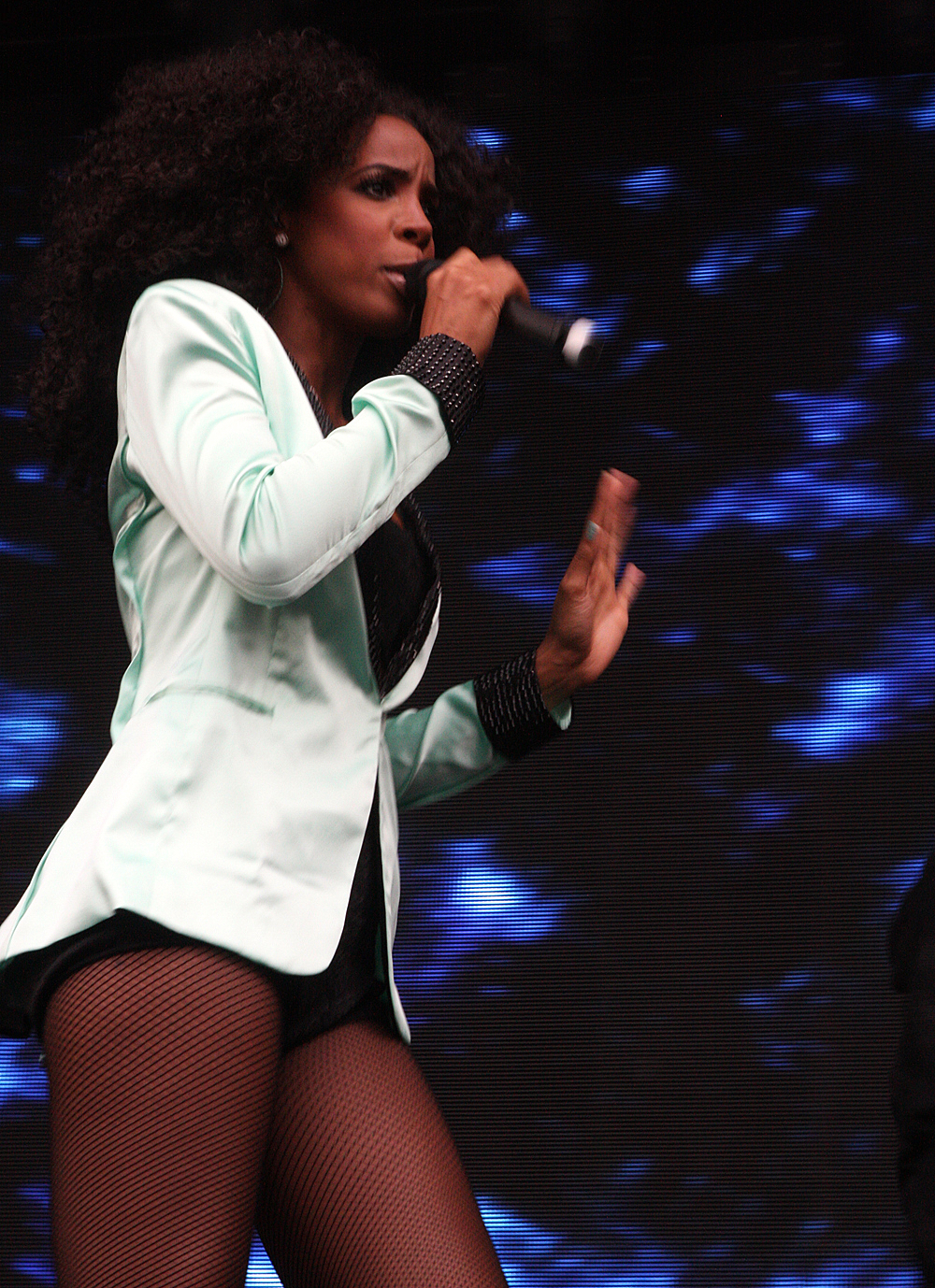
Kelly Rowland performing in Sydney, Australia in 2012.

Rowland has acknowledged on several occasions that although she loved dance music, it was not really the type of music she would record, mainly preferring an R&B sound. While in Europe, in 2008, she met Guetta at one of his DJ sets in Southern France and commented that "Listening to him was just crazy." Guetta was playing the instrumental version of "When Love Takes Over". Recalling that it brought tears to her eyes, Rowland remarked, "I felt so much emotion from the track; something happened the first time I heard it, and it was just beautiful. And I remember thinking 'Why is this touching me like this?' You know, it was like there was a kinda soul-tie to it!" Upon meeting Guetta, she asked him for the song so she could write its lyrics. "So I met David and asked him for the track... He gave it to me, and I brought it back here to London, UK and wrote the actual song". At a later writing session, in a London hotel room, Rowland and songwriting duo Nervo wrote the lyrics and melody over Guetta's backing track. Rowland later rejoined Guetta, with Julie Terry Lefèvre-Han, in the recording studio to finish the song.

Subsequently, in a 2010 interview, Nervo revealed that Rowland's record label, Columbia Records, was not keen on the song, despite their and Rowland's enthusiasm. For this reason, "When Love Takes Over" was shelved until Guetta rediscovered the song while compiling material for his fourth studio album, One Love. The finished song with Rowland's vocals and Guetta's production was premiered in March 2009 at the Ultra Music Festival in Miami. A month later, on 21 April 2009, the single was released in Europe and the United States.

== Recording and production ==
The recording and mixing of "When Love Takes Over" took place in summer and autumn of 2008. After Rowland heard the instrumental of "When Love Takes Over"—a piano loop-based melody with throbbing percussion—she asked Guetta if she could take the demo and several other tracks to work on. She wrote the lyrics and recorded the vocals in London within a day. She was aided by Australian songwriters and producers Miriam and Olivia Nervo (Nervo). However, the song was not a top choice by Rowland's team, and remained unfinished until Guetta rediscovered it while compiling his One Love album. After being selected for the album, "When Love Takes Over" was given to Frédéric Riesterer who, aside from producing the song with Guetta, was tasked with the final audio mixing of the song. However, Riesterer decided to give the track to French mixing engineer Veronica Ferraro, who would later go on to say that "Reisterer was supposed to mix it, but he wanted me to do it and see how it turned out. The first time I heard the track I immediately knew it would be a huge hit." The track was mixed in September 2008 at Ferraro's Super Sonic Scale studio, near Paris, the day after her birthday.

Before working on the song's individual elements, Ferraro decided that she would focus primarily on Rowland's vocals.

"Frédéric had the right sounds on the drums and the keyboards, so I did not change very much. I just did some standard things, with EQ and compression and things like that. After that my obsession was to get the vocals to sound as good as possible. When I'm mixing a track, I want something to happen, something that takes the listener somewhere. You want the right things in the right place, but it's not a technical issue. It's actually an artistic issue to have everything in the right place – the mixing has to be magic. It was not difficult in this case, because I knew the song would be a hit, but I did my best to make the vocal sound magical, like an angel singing, so that the hit quality of the song was immediately obvious. I wanted to make sure that the voice takes you from the beginning to the end and doesn't lose you."

Ferraro told Sound on Sound that she added a bass drum sample, as she felt that the kick was missing something; "Rather than equalise it, I added a little bit of my sample to make the BD track sound bigger". She altered the two piano elements of the song, using the Flex Studio Tool to widen the sound of the piano element without the delay. Additionally, Ferraro used a number of French plug-in software to amplify many of the track's instruments, including the violin, strings and guitar samples. She then moved on to Rowland's vocals, which "were extensively processed", including equalization and de-essing. Then upon completion of her work on the song, Ferraro sent "When Love Takes Over" to her husband, Bruno Gruel, and his Elektra Mastering Suite. He realigned all of the elements of the song, particularly the bass drums and low synths.

== Composition ==
David Guetta feat. Kelly Rowland – "When Love Takes Over" (2009)
A 19-second sample of "When Love Takes Over", where the "lush piano loop" and "throbbing percussion" lead into Rowland's "powerhouse diva vocals"

"When Love Takes Over" is a synth-pop and "uplifting floor-filler" produced by Guetta and his associate Frédéric Riesterer. Jason Lipshutz from Billboard magazine described it as a "pop number built around a lush piano loop and throbbing percussion" with trance elements. The song was written in the key of F♯ mixolydian with a time signature of common time and a tempo of 130 beats per minute. The final recording and mixing took place at Gum Prod Studios in Paris. Some elements of the song were compared to the riff and piano opener in the song "Clocks" by Coldplay.

After gaining Guetta's approval to write vocals for the song, Rowland took the instrumental version to London, where she wrote the bulk of the lyrics with Nervo (twins Miriam and Olivia Nervo) before sending the song back to Guetta, who added his own contributions with Frédéric Riesterer. Rowland uses a vocal range of F♯_{3} to D♯_{5}. Guetta said that "Kelly['s vocals] had this Whitney Houston vibe and nailed it." Critics agreed, noting that often her vocals were "powerful" and "grand". Others called them "a diva masterclass" and "emotionally charged". Fraser McAlpine from BBC Online compared Rowland's vocals to those by Madonna in "Ray of Light", for their "hands-in-the-air pop song" qualities.

== Critical reception ==
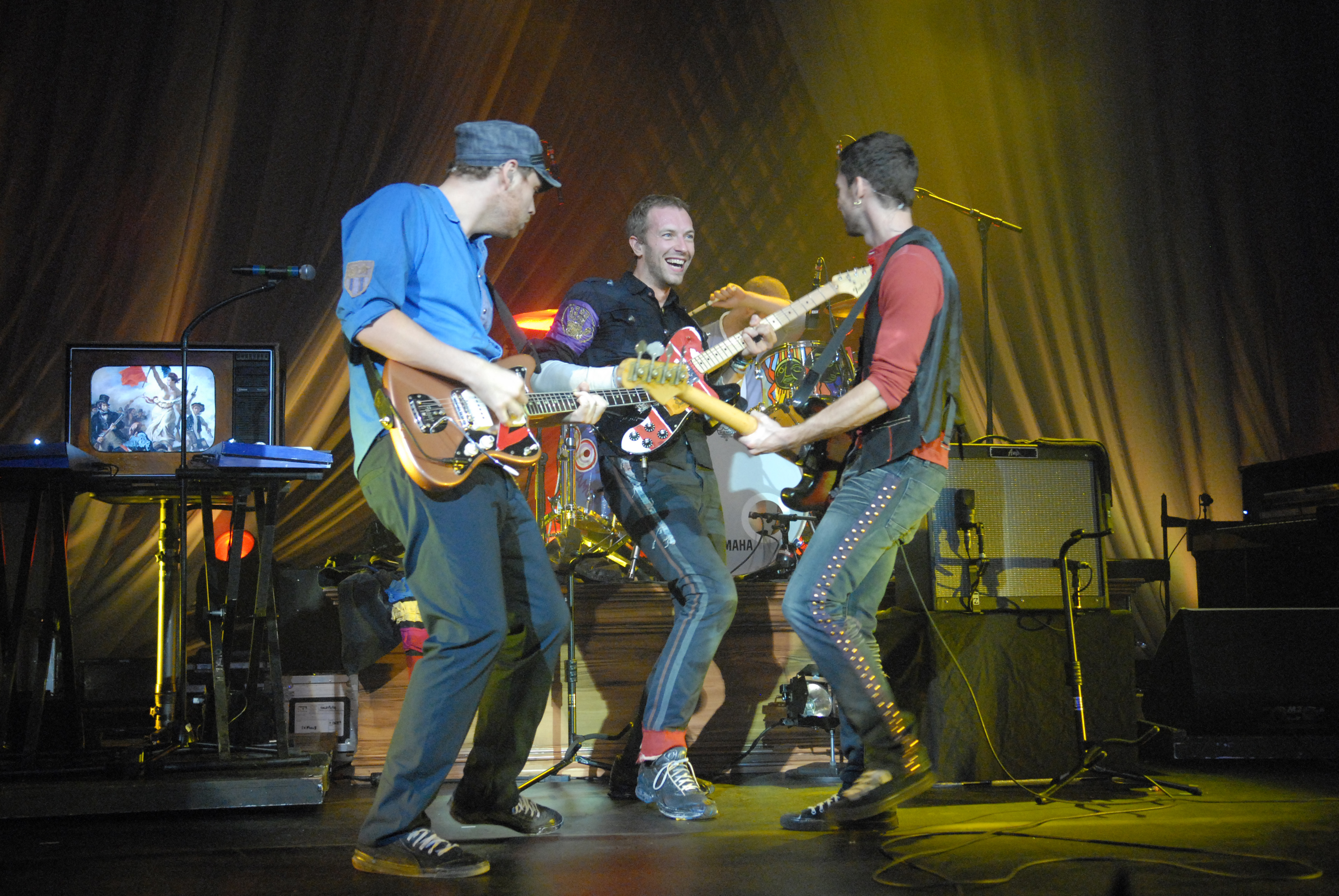
Critics found the song similar to "Clocks" by Coldplay.

The song received widespread acclaim from music critics for both Guetta's catchy production and Rowland's strong vocals. It was called the strongest and most commercial single choice from Guetta's album, One Love. Critics noted that the song's opening piano riff was similar to that from Coldplay's hit single "Clocks" (2002). David Jefferes of Allmusic gave the song a thumbs up saying, calling "When Love Takes Over" one of the strongest songs from One Love and praising the "[addition of] the powerful voice of Kelly Rowland for one grand, uplifting floor-filler." Simon Vozick-Levinson of Entertainment Weekly agreed calling the song the "most memorable from the album" and recalling "Clocks" by Coldplay to make "a showstopper starring Kelly Rowland." Michael Hibbard of MusicOMH was impressed with both the production and vocal work on "When Love Takes Over". He pointed out the rarity in the amount of promotion given to the song, referring to "When Love Takes Over" being given "its own poster on the Tube." He also described the song as a "euphoric masterpiece" backed by "at least eight remixes " and the accompany vocals from "Destiny's Child songbird Kelly Rowland on hand for a diva masterclass." Also agreeing with these comments was Fraser McAlpine from BBC Online who awarded the song four out of five stars. "The genius ingredients include a thinly reworked go at the piano riff to 'Clocks' by Coldplay and handclaps ... And the fairy dust is...well...it's your standard dance-pop production, actually." However he noted that the production was "tastefully done to make sure that the good bits are not spoilt". Other elements of the song such as the "bed of synthistrings, a skippy beat, a breakdown, some riffing glassy electronics and a dramatic, cinematic bottom end drone" were praised. McAlpine also praised Rowland's appearance on the track, commenting who she sounded "entirely unlike herself, so that even SHE is all buffed up and shiny." He described the marriage of Rowland's vocals and Guetta's production by stating that "[Rowland's] got a spiralling, sky-scraping melody to sing too."

Erin Martin of PopMatters said that "When Love Takes Over" had euphoric properties. Martin said the song was "a classic, triumphant dance number, and Rowland's powerhouse vocals ensure that this song has anthemic potential for years to come. This song just feels good to listen to". She also noted that the song was central to the concept and "love-spreading message [that] Guetta delivers on the album as a whole." David Balls of Digital Spy agreed with the song's anthem credentials. "[It] is further evidence that Rowland may no longer be resigned to living in Beyoncé [Knowles'] shadow. Fusing classic dance beats with a heady, emotionally charged vocal, it's a world away from the mid-tempo R&B numbers with which she started her solo career. In fact, this packs a punch from the very first listen, meaning it could well become one of the summer anthems of 2009." However, Mikael Wood of the Los Angeles Times was less impressed than the other critics, simply noting the song as "a cheesy synthpop makeover of Coldplay's 'Clocks'." Wood did however state that it was among Guetta's best work and was an example of when the DJ is "most commercial".

The song was nominated for the Best Dance Recording award at the 52nd Grammy Awards ceremony. It lost out to "Poker Face" by Lady Gaga. The song's Electro Extended Remix was successful at the ceremony, winning Guetta his first Grammy Award for the Best Remixed Recording, Non-Classical. In 2013, Billboard named "When Love Takes Over" their number one dance-pop collaboration of all time.

== Chart performance ==
In Guetta's native France, "When Love Takes Over" debuted on the French Digital Chart at number 14 on 25 April 2009 before subsequently peaking at number three on 18 July 2009. On the French Singles Chart, it debuted and peaked at number two. In August 2009, Guetta had two simultaneous top 10 singles on the chart, the other being "Sexy Bitch" featuring Akon. Following is strong run on the charts, the Syndicat National de l'Édition Phonographique (SNEP) awarded the single a Gold certification for selling 150,000+ copies. In Rowland's native country of the United States the single was successful, topping both the Hot Dance Airplay and Hot Dance Club Songs charts, as well as reaching number 76 on the Billboard Hot 100. This became Guetta's highest Hot 100 chart position at the time. It was Rowland's highest Hot 100 Chart entry since her feature of Trina's 2005 single, "Here We Go". "When Love Takes Over" ranked at number one on the Best of 2009 Dance Club Songs chart and number thirty-three on the End of Decade (2000–2009) Dance Club Songs Chart. "When Loves Takes Over" is one of the most successful songs on the top of the Türkiye Top 20 chart where it received airplay for 10 consecutive weeks.

"When Love Takes Over" also achieved success in Europe, topping charts in Belgium (Wallonia), Czech Republic, Hungary, Ireland, Italy, Slovakia, Switzerland and the United Kingdom. It also reached the top 10 in most other regions apart from Brazil, Canada and the United States. By the end of 2009 it reached the top 30 on most year-end charts, most notably reaching number two in Switzerland, number five in Belgium (Wallonia), and six on the European Hot 100. It was certified Platinum in nine countries.

In the United Kingdom, Guetta and Rowland's original version debuted at number seven on the UK Singles Chart, having sold 25,000 copies. The following week Guetta's version peaked at number one, beating his previous best chart peak of number three with 2007's "Love Don't Let Me Go (Walking Away)". It gave Rowland her second number one single in Britain, the first being "Dilemma" alongside Nelly in October 2002. "When Love Takes Over" was awarded a double Platinum certification by the British Phonographic Industry in September 2022 for sales and stream of over 1,200,000 units. On The Official Charts Company's official countdown of the Top 100 British Downloads of all time, "When Love Takes Over" ranks at number 58, marking Rowland's only entry on the chart. However it is Guetta's second entry on the chart, behind "Sexy Bitch" (with Akon) which charted at number 27. In total, the single has sold over 5.5 million copies worldwide.

== Music video ==
=== Background and concept ===
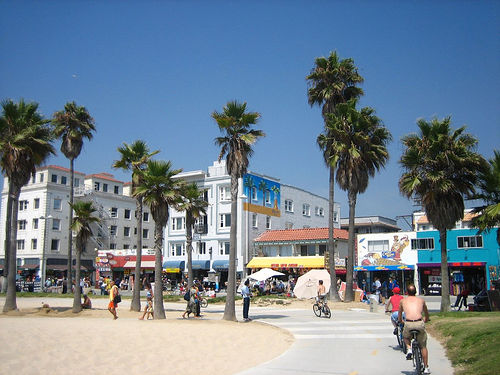
Venice Beach and the Boardwalk, as seen in the music video for "When Love Takes Over"

The music video was filmed on 19 May 2009 at Venice Beach, Los Angeles, directed by Jonas Åkerlund. Guetta revealed that the video's story and concept were designed to mimic the story behind the song's creation. He said, "you see Kelly doing her thing and then me on the other side doing mine. Eventually we come together just like how we recorded the song. It's all about sharing the love from this record and making a big party". These reflections and more behind the scenes footage were revealed in the video clip "Making of When Love Takes Over" which was uploaded to Guetta's official YouTube channel on 1 June 2009. The music video itself premiered on 8 June 2009 on Guetta's YouTube channel. The video premiered after the European and United States digital release but just before the single's UK digital release on 10 June 2009.

=== Synopsis and reception ===
The video focuses on Rowland walking through the streets of Venice Beach while Guetta gathers his DJ equipment and pushes it towards the beach. Through the video a number of street performers join the gathering crowd, including a motocross bicycler, a skateboarder, and a b-boy Cloud. The last scene, sees Rowland and Guetta unite on the beach for a late night party which sees the duo performing together. Capital FM described the video as "lots of shots of people having fun in the sun". Melinda Newman from Hitfix praised Rowland's role in the clip saying that

"[Rowland] is fierce throughout and it clearly experiencing a bit of a career resurgence after a dip. [She] gives her best Beyoncé-type stares straight into the camera (but we're sure that's just a coincidence)... Guetta, who is relegated to a supporting role in his own video, shows up pushing his gear on a cart, looking basically like any other homeless guy hanging out in Venice."

Some criticism did follow the video. Capital FM radio station felt that Guetta's appearance in the clip was slightly disappointing. "Guetta looks a bit like a binman pushing his gear round the streets in some of the earlier shots in the video". Newman said that the video's director, Jonas Åkerlund, had removed something from the song. "The video could have built on the great beat that builds within the song and the feeling of abandon that falling in love can bring you, but, instead, we get a telegenic couple making out who seem to drop in from nowhere."

== Performances and promotion ==
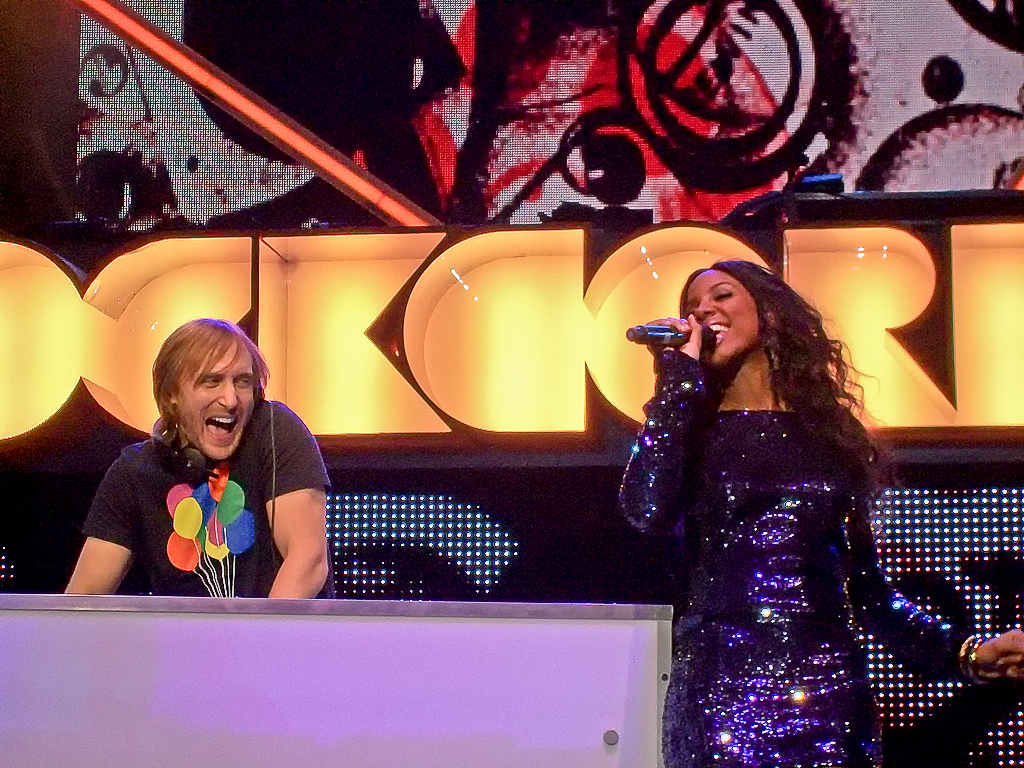
David Guetta and Kelly Rowland performing at Orange Rockcorps, London

Guetta premiered the completed version of "When Love Takes Over" on 23 March 2009 at the Ultra Music Festival. Promotion of the single began in the UK with an acoustic performance of the single at the BBC Radio 1 Live Lounge on 10 May 2009 and then again on UK daytime show, This Morning, on 18 June 2009. They also appeared at the Miss Universe 2009 contest in The Bahamas, where the duo performed the song live for the "Evening Gown" competition. Another major part of the promotion included appearances at the Loop Live 2009 music festival in Sofia, Bulgaria and Rowland's appeared at the TAO Night Club in Las Vegas, where she hosted celebrations for "When Love Takes Over" reaching number one around the world. The duo returned to the UK to perform at Orange Rockcorps at London's Royal Albert Hall in September 2009, before performing at the 2009 MTV Latin America Music Video Awards on 15 October 2010. It was used by US TV channel, Bravo, during an internal advertising campaign.

== Cover versions ==
=== Airi L version ===
British dance music artist Airi L released a bootleg version of the song 9 May 2009, several days before the Guetta and Rowland version was due to be released. EMI Music called Airi L's version "inferior" and decided to combat her cover by releasing Guetta's version on 11 June 2009 in the UK, earlier than originally planned. The cover debuted and peaked at number 22, selling 12,000 copies whilst Guetta and Rowland's version debuted at number seven with 25,000 copies. According to Yahoo! Music's James Masterton, Rowland's version would have debuted at a higher place had it not been for the "bootleg cover". He said the single had to be rush released "when not one but two spoiler (and indeed near-identical) cover versions started to race up the iTunes rankings and threatened to have a negatively impact on the 'official' version." The following week Guetta and Rowland's version would debut at number one.

=== Matt Cardle version ===
In the second week of October 2010, the song was covered twice by contestants on The X Factor. Matt Cardle performed his version on the opening show of the seventh series of the UK version. Following Cardle's performance, "When Love Takes Over" jumped twelve places on UK Dance Chart, to number seventeen.

== Legacy ==
Rowland told MTV that "working with David is amazing. We have a great relationship, it's so effortless. He's such a talented individual. But most importantly he's such a down to earth, nice guy and I really enjoy working with him. We have good musical chemistry together." Guetta told Billboard that "the track with Kelly has made him experiment with a more American urban influence. Musically, it's pure pop with a lot of detail." Additionally British singer Cheryl Cole (of Girls Aloud) credited "When Love Takes Over" for inspiring her taste and preference in dance music, which in turn influenced her second solo single "3 Words" (featuring will.i.am).

The track was also featured on the fictional radio station Vladivostok FM and fictional nightclub Bahama Mamas on the soundtrack of the video game Grand Theft Auto: The Ballad of Gay Tony. However, it was removed in April 2018 due to expiring music licenses coinciding with the 10th anniversary of Grand Theft Auto IV.

Later in 2010 when recording her third album, Here I Am (2011), Rowland credited both Guetta and the song for inspiring her to pursue a new sound. Rowland relates: "I spent about a year of my life in Europe really listening to a whole bunch of Europeans DJs and hearing dance music a lot on the radio and really loving it. 'When Love Takes Over' it was my first introduction to dance music [and] it was a whole other monster. It's really a culture and I love it." In 2010, following the success of "When Love Takes Over" and the duo's musical chemistry, Guetta was asked to work on Rowland's third studio album. He co-produced a couple of the songs including the album's first single, "Commander".

Later in 2013, Kerri Mason and Zel McCarthy compiled a list of the top-ten dance-pop collaborations of all time for Billboard magazine. In their article, the critics named "When Love Takes Over" at the top of the list, saying that the song "repositioned Kelly Rowland as a solo vocalist with chops on her own." The duo also commented that subsequent collaborations between Guetta and Rowland were not as good as "When Love Takes Over", also adding that Rowland's vocal was firmly part of "dance music history" and were an indication of the growing electronic dance music (EDM) trend emerging in America at the time.

In a 2020 feature titled "Should Have Been Bigger" on the website Idolator, Mike Wass was reflecting on the underperformance of Rowland's follow up dance song "Commander" and noted that "When Love Take Over" firmly established Rowland as the "newly crowned Queen of Clubs in 2010".

In 2023, Season 15 of RuPaul's Drag Race used "When Love Takes Over" as the lip-sync song in episode 14 between contestants Anetra and Mistress Isabelle Brooks.

== Track listing ==
- Digital download
1. "When Love Takes Over" (feat. Kelly Rowland) – 3:08
- UK digital EP
1. "When Love Takes Over" (Original Extended Edit) – 6:46
2. "When Love Takes Over" (Electro Extended Edit) – 6:56
3. "When Love Takes Over" (Norman Doray & Arno Cost Remix) – 6:50
4. "When Love Takes Over" (Laidback Luke Remix) – 5:35
5. "When Love Takes Over" (Blame Remix) – 5:13
6. "When Love Takes Over" (Albin Myers Remix) – 6:57
- Digital download – Abel Ramos Remix
1. "When Love Takes Over" (Abel Ramos Paris With Love Mix) – 8:14
- Digital download – Donaeo Remix
1. "When Love Takes Over" (Donaeo Remix) – 4:57
- CD single (2-track)
1. "When Love Takes Over" – 3:09
2. "When Love Takes Over" (Electro Radio Edit) – 3:02
- CD single (3-track)
1. "When Love Takes Over" – 3:10
2. "When Love Takes Over" (Electro Radio Edit) – 3:02
3. "When Love Takes Over" (Laidback Luke Remix) – 6:09
- US digital EP
1. "When Love Takes Over" (Electro Radio Edit) – 3:02
2. "When Love Takes Over" (Electro Extended Mix) – 8:19
3. "When Love Takes Over" (Abel Ramos Paris With Love Mix) – 8:14
  - UK radio edit
  - (exclusive to Now That's What I Call Music! 73 CD)
1. "When Love Takes Over" (UK Radio edit) – 3:24
- UK 12" Maxi single (1)
1. "When Love Takes Over" (Electro Extended Edit) – 6:56
2. "When Love Takes Over" (Norman Doray & Arno Cost Remix) – 6:50
3. "When Love Takes Over" (Laidback Luke Remix) – 5:35
- UK 12" Maxi single (2)
1. "When Love Takes Over" (Original Extended Mix) – 7:46
2. "When Love Takes Over" (Blame Remix) – 5:19
- France 12" Maxi single (1)
1. "When Love Takes Over" (Electro Extended) – 8:20
2. "When Love Takes Over" (Norman Doray & Arno Cost Remix) – 7:10
- France 12" Maxi single (2)
1. "When Love Takes Over" (Laidback Luke Remix) – 6:05
2. "When Love Takes Over" (Albin Myers Remix) – 8:27
3. "When Love Takes Over" (Abel Ramos Paris With Love Mix) – 8:12
- Maxi single (CD/Download)
1. "When Love Takes Over" – 3:09
2. "When Love Takes Over" (Electro Radio Edit) – 3:02
3. "When Love Takes Over" (Laidback Luke Remix) – 6:08
4. "When Love Takes Over" (Norman Doray & Arno Cost Remix) – 7:13
5. "When Love Takes Over" (Albin Myers Remix) – 8:29
6. "When Love Takes Over" (Abel Ramos Paris With Love Mix) – 8:14
7. "When Love Takes Over" (Electro Extended Mix) – 8:20
- US remixes EP
1. "When Love Takes Over" (Albin Myers Remix) – 8:29
2. "When Love Takes Over" (Laidback Luke Remix) – 6:08
3. "When Love Takes Over" (Norman Doray & Arno Cost Remix) – 7:12

== Credits ==
Recording

- The instrumental for "When Love Takes Over" was recorded in 2008 at Gum Prod Studios, Paris.
- The vocals were added in 2009 in London and the final version was mixed at Super Sonic Scale Studios.

Personnel

- David Guetta – songwriting, producer
- Kelly Rowland – songwriter, vocals
- Miriam Nervo – songwriter
- Olivia Nervo – songwriter
- Tom Fuller – Vocal Engineer
- Frédéric Riesterer – songwriter, producer
- Véronica Ferraro – audio mixing
- Bruno Gruel – mastering

== Charts ==
=== Weekly charts ===
| Chart (2009–2010) | Peak position |
|---|---|
| Australia (ARIA) | 6 |
| Australia Dance (ARIA) | 2 |
| Austria (Ö3 Austria Top 40) | 3 |
| Belgium (Ultratop 50 Flanders) | 2 |
| Belgium (Ultratop 50 Wallonia) | 1 |
| Brasil Hot 100 Airplay (Billboard) | 9 |
| Canada Hot 100 (Billboard) | 22 |
| Canada AC (Billboard) | 26 |
| Canada CHR/Top 40 (Billboard) | 19 |
| Canada Hot AC (Billboard) | 20 |
| CIS Airplay (TopHit) | 2 |
| Croatia International Airplay (HRT) | 1 |
| Czech Republic Airplay (ČNS IFPI) | 1 |
| Denmark (Tracklisten) | 2 |
| Europe (European Hot 100 Singles) | 1 |
| Euro Digital Song Sales (Billboard) | 1 |
| Finland (Suomen virallinen lista) | 7 |
| France (SNEP) | 2 |
| Germany (GfK) | 2 |
| Global Dance Songs (Billboard) | 1 |
| Hungary (Dance Top 40) | 8 |
| Hungary (Rádiós Top 40) | 1 |
| Hungary (Single Top 40) | 3 |
| Ireland (IRMA) | 1 |
| Israel International Airplay (Media Forest) | 1 |
| Italy (FIMI) | 1 |
| Luxembourg Digital Songs (Billboard) | 1 |
| Netherlands (Dutch Top 40) | 2 |
| Netherlands (Single Top 100) | 5 |
| Mexico Ingles Airplay (Billboard) | 6 |
| New Zealand (Recorded Music NZ) | 7 |
| Norway (VG-lista) | 3 |
| Romania (Romanian Top 100) | 1 |
| Romania Airplay (Media Forest) | 1 |
| Russia Airplay (TopHit) | 6 |
| Scottish Singles Sales (Official Charts) | 2 |
| Slovakia Airplay (ČNS IFPI) | 1 |
| Spain (Promusicae) | 4 |
| Sweden (Sverigetopplistan) | 2 |
| Switzerland (Schweizer Hitparade) | 1 |
| UK Singles (Official Charts) | 1 |
| UK Dance (Official Charts) | 1 |
| US Billboard Hot 100 | 76 |
| US Dance Club Songs (Billboard) | 1 |
| US Dance Airplay (Billboard) | 1 |
| US Pop Airplay (Billboard) | 29 |

| Chart (2026) | Peak position |
|---|---|
| UK Singles Downloads (Official Charts) | 70 |

=== Year-end charts ===
| Chart (2009) | Position |
|---|---|
| Australia (ARIA) | 28 |
| Australia Dance (ARIA) | 8 |
| Austria (Ö3 Austria Top 40) | 11 |
| Belgium (Ultratop 50 Flanders) | 12 |
| Belgium (Ultratop 50 Wallonia) | 5 |
| Canada (Canadian Hot 100) | 92 |
| CIS (TopHit) | 22 |
| Denmark (IFPI) | 8 |
| Europe (European Hot 100 Single) | 6 |
| France (SNEP) | 20 |
| Germany (Media Control GfK) | 10 |
| Hungary (Dance Top 40) | 40 |
| Hungary (Rádiós Top 40) | 15 |
| Ireland (IRMA) | 16 |
| Italy (FIMI) | 16 |
| Japan Adult Contemporary (Billboard) | 93 |
| Netherlands (Dutch Top 40) | 3 |
| Netherlands (Single Top 100) | 19 |
| New Zealand (RIANZ) | 36 |
| Russia Airplay (TopHit) | 44 |
| Spain (PROMUSICAE) | 20 |
| Sweden (Sverigetopplistan) | 8 |
| Switzerland (Schweizer Hitparade) | 2 |
| UK Singles (OCC) | 20 |
| US Dance Club Songs (Billboard) | 1 |

| Chart (2010) | Position |
|---|---|
| Hungary (Rádiós Top 40) | 9 |
| US Dance/Electronic Digital Songs (Billboard) | 36 |

=== Decade-end charts ===
| Chart (2000–09) | Position |
|---|---|
| Germany (Official German Charts) | 59 |
| US Dance Club Songs (Billboard) | 33 |

== Certifications ==
Certifications for When Love Takes Over
| Region | Certification | Certified units/sales |
|---|---|---|
| Australia (ARIA) | 2× Platinum | 140,000^{^} |
| Austria (IFPI Austria) | 2× Platinum | 60,000^{*} |
| Belgium (BRMA) | Gold | |
| Canada (Music Canada) | Gold | 20,000^{*} |
| Denmark (IFPI Danmark) | Platinum | 30,000^{^} |
| France (SNEP) | Gold | 150,000^{*} |
| Germany (BVMI) | Platinum | 300,000^{^} |
| Italy (FIMI) | Platinum | 20,000^{*} |
| New Zealand (RMNZ) | 2× Platinum | 60,000^{‡} |
| Spain (Promusicae) | Platinum | 40,000^{*} |
| Sweden (GLF) | Gold | 10,000^{‡} |
| Switzerland (IFPI Switzerland) | Platinum | 30,000^{^} |
| United Kingdom (BPI) | 2× Platinum | 1,200,000^{‡} |
^{*} Sales figures based on certification alone.^{^} Shipments figures based on certification alone.^{‡} Sales+streaming figures based on certification alone.

== Release history ==
| Format | Date | Label |
|---|---|---|
| CD single (2-track) | 11 May 2009 | Virgin France; EMI Music |
| Digital download | 10 June 2009 | Virgin France; EMI Music |
| CD single (3-track) | 12 June 2009 | Virgin France; EMI Music |
| Maxi single | 12 June 2009 | Virgin France; EMI Music |
| France 12" maxi single (1) | 15 June 2009 | Virgin France; EMI Music |
| UK 12" maxi single (1) | 22 June 2009 | Virgin France; EMI Music |
| UK 12" maxi single (2) | 26 June 2009 | Virgin France; EMI Music |
| France 12" maxi single (2) | 31 July 2009 | Virgin France; EMI Music |
| UK CD maxi single | 31 August 2009 | Virgin France; EMI Music |

== See also ==
- List of best-selling singles
- List of European number-one hits of 2009
- List of number-one dance singles of 2009 (U.S.)
- List of number-one hits of 2009 (Switzerland)
- List of number-one singles from the 2000s (UK)
- Number-one dance airplay hits of 2009 (U.S.)
- Number-one singles of 2009 (Ireland)
- List of Romanian Top 100 number ones of the 2000s
- Ultratop 40 number-one hits of 2009
