= One Love (David Guetta album) =

2009 studio album by David Guetta

Studio album by David Guetta
- Released: 24 August 2009
- Recorded: 2008–2009
- Genres: Electro-house, Dance
- Length: 55:18
- Labels: Virgin; EMI; Astralwerks
- Producers: David Guetta; Frédéric Riesterer; Jean-Claude Sindres; Sandy Vee

David Guetta chronology
Pop Life (2007)	One Love (2009)	Nothing but the Beat (2011)

Alternative cover
- One More Love cover

Singles from One Love
- 1. "When Love Takes Over" Released: 21 April 2009; 2. "Sexy Bitch" Released: 24 July 2009; 3. "One Love" Released: 23 November 2009; 4. "Memories" Released: 8 February 2010

Singles from One More Love
- 1. "Gettin' Over You" Released: 12 April 2010; 2. "Who's That Chick?" Released: 22 November 2010

One Love is the fourth studio album by French DJ and record producer David Guetta, first released in the United Kingdom on 24 August 2009 through Virgin Records. Guetta's first major international release, the album received generally favourable reviews from music critics, and was a commercial success, selling over 3 million copies globally. It spawned a total of six worldwide hit singles throughout 2009 and 2010, most notably "When Love Takes Over", featuring American singer Kelly Rowland, "Sexy Bitch", featuring Senegalese-American R&B singer Akon, "Who's That Chick?", featuring Barbadian singer Rihanna, and "One Love", featuring British singer Estelle. One Love is also Guetta's last studio album to feature his long-time collaborator, Chris Willis, on vocals. Since the album's initial release, it has since been reissued several times to include previously unreleased tracks and other bonus material.

The album received a nomination for Best Electronic/Dance Album at the 52nd Grammy Awards. The album's lead single, "When Love Takes Over" was nominated in the categories of Best Dance Recording and Best Remixed Recording, Non-Classical, and won the latter.

== Critical reception ==
Professional ratings
Aggregate scores
Source	Rating
Metacritic	66/100
Review scores
Source	Rating
AllMusic	3.5/5 stars
Digital Spy	4/5 stars
Entertainment Weekly	B
The Guardian	3/5 stars
Los Angeles Times	3/4 stars
musicOMH	3/5 stars
Now	3/5 stars
PopMatters	6/10
Q	3/5 stars
The Times	3/5 stars

One Love received generally favourable reviews from most music critics. According to Metacritic, which assigns a normalized rating out of 100 to reviews from mainstream critics, the album received an average score of 66, based on ten reviews, which indicates "generally favorable reviews". Entertainment website Digital Spy gave the album a very positive review and awarded it four out of five stars. The Los Angeles Times gave the album 3/4, saying "Guetta is at his best (and his most commercial) when he's equipped with a melody as chewy as his beats." Ginger Clemens of Billboard called it an effortless integration of catchy dance beats with expressive vocals, turning out Top 40-friendly songs while remaining true to dance club culture. David Jeffries of AllMusic wrote that "even if everything seems built for the 12" format and then landed on an album anyway, Guetta's fans get all the well-done house music they desire, and then some." Michael Hubbard of musicOMH felt that Guetta "can doubtless get a party started every bit as effectively as either of those two [Paul van Dyk and Diplo] but, on this record at least, in dance terms he finds himself rather falling between two stools as he enlarges the walls of his big tent." Caroline Sullivan of The Guardian gave One Love 3 out of 5 stars, calling many of the songs enjoyable while favouring "Estelle's tender performance of the title track" and mentioning that "It feels like a series of tracks rather than a fully realised long-player." Now called One Love "surprisingly deep". Observer Music Monthly called it "the sound of the summer! If summer for you means a fake tan and drinking WKD for a week in the Med with the likes of Kelly Rowland and Will.i.am popping up as guests with your fave."

== Singles ==
"When Love Takes Over" was released as the first single and featured Kelly Rowland. The song was a worldwide hit and peaked at number one in the UK and won the Best Remixed Recording, Non-Classical Grammy Award, selling over 5.5 million copies worldwide. "Sexy Bitch" was the second single from the album and featured Akon. The song has become a worldwide hit, reaching the top spot on thirteen different charts. It peaked at number one in the UK as well as many other countries. "I Wanna Go Crazy" was the album's only promotional single, released on 24 August 2009. "One Love" was released as the third worldwide single from the album and featured Estelle. It topped the US Billboard Hot Dance Club Songs chart. "Memories" was released as the fourth single on 15 March 2010 and features Kid Cudi. The song peaked at number one in Belgium, Czech Republic and Netherlands.

The extended version of the song "How Soon Is Now" (with Sebastian Ingrosso and Dirty South, featuring Julie McKnight) was a single released exclusively on Beatport on 12 August 2009 through Guetta's own label, F*** Me I'm Famous Records (a subdivision of Gum Productions). The song has reached number 52 on the Swedish charts.

"Gettin' Over You", is the lead single from One More Love with vocals of Chris Willis, Fergie and LMFAO. It topped the charts in the United Kingdom and France.

"Who's That Chick?" is the second single from One More Love. It features Rihanna. The song's music video was used as part of a promotional ad campaign for Doritos. Two music videos were created, a day and a night one. They were released on 22 November 2010.

== Track listing ==
- All songs written and produced by David Guetta. Additional producers and lyricists listed.

=== One Love ===
No.	Title	Lyrics	Producer(s)	Length
1.	"When Love Takes Over" (featuring Kelly Rowland)	Miriam Nervo; Olivia Nervo; Kelly Rowland	Frédéric Riesterer	3:11
2.	"Gettin' Over" (featuring Chris Willis)	Sandy Vee; Jean-Claude Sindres; Chris Willis; Frédéric Riesterer	Vee; Sindres; Riesterer	3:01
3.	"Sexy Bitch" (featuring Akon)	Giorgio Tuinfort; Aliaune Thiam; Vee; Sindres	Vee; Sindres	3:16
4.	"Memories" (featuring Kid Cudi)	Scott Ramon Seguro Mescudi; Riesterer	Riesterer	3:30
5.	"On the Dancefloor" (featuring will.i.am & apl.de.ap)	William Adams; Allan Pineda; Sindres; Vee	Vee; Sindres	3:45
6.	"It's the Way You Love Me" (featuring Kelly Rowland)	Miriam Nervo; Olivia Nervo; Riesterer; Rowland	Riesterer	4:13
7.	"Missing You" (featuring Novel)	Alonzo Stephenson; Sindres; Vee	Vee; Sindres	3:05
8.	"Choose" (featuring Ne-Yo & Kelly Rowland)	Riesterer; Shaffer Smith	Riesterer	3:57
9.	"How Soon Is Now" (with Sebastian Ingrosso & Dirty South featuring Julie McKnight)	Jason Sealee; Riesterer; Ingrosso; Dragan Roganovic	Dirty South; Ingrosso; Riesterer	4:10
10.	"I Gotta Feeling" (FMIF Remix Edit) (by The Black Eyed Peas)	William Adams, Jr; apl.de.ap; Jaime Gomez; Stacy Ferguson; Riesterer	Riesterer	3:52
11.	"One Love" (featuring Estelle)	Estelle Swaray; Sindres; Vee	Vee; Sindres	4:01
12.	"I Wanna Go Crazy" (featuring will.i.am)	Adams	Sindres; Vee	3:24
13.	"Sound of Letting Go" (with Tocadisco featuring Chris Willis)	Miriam Nervo; Olivia Nervo	Tocadisco	3:45
14.	"Toyfriend" (with Afrojack featuring Wynter Gordon)	Diana Wynter Gordon; Steven Battey; Carlos Battey	Afrojack; The Jackie Boyz	3:17
15.	"If We Ever" (featuring Makeba)	Makeba Riddick; Riesterer; Vee; Sindres	Vee; Sindres; Riesterer	4:40

UK bonus track
No.	Title	Lyrics	Music	Producer(s)	Length
16.	"Sexy Chick" (featuring Akon)	Giorgio Tuinfort; Aliaune Thiam; Sandy Vee; Jean-Claude Sindres	Vee; Sindres	Vee; Sindres	3:15

New version bonus track
No.	Title	Lyrics	Music	Producer(s)	Length
16.	"Gettin' Over You" (with Chris Willis featuring Fergie and LMFAO)	Sandy Vee; Jean-Claude Sindres; Chris Willis; Frédéric Riesterer	Vee; Sindres; Riesterer	Vee; Sindres; Riesterer	3:08

European iTunes bonus tracks
No.	Title	Lyrics	Music	Producer(s)	Length
16.	"I Need You Now" (with Laidback Luke featuring Samantha Jade)	Samantha Jade	Laidback Luke	Laidback Luke	3:36
17.	"It's Your Life" (featuring Chris Willis)	Miriam; Olivia Nervo	Jean-Claude Sindres; Sandy Vee	Jean-Claude Sindres; Sandy Vee	3:44

American iTunes bonus tracks
No.	Title	Music	Producer(s)	Length
16.	"Montenegro"	Jean-Claude Sindres; Sandy Vee	Sindres; Vee	5:58
17.	"Grrrr"	Jean-Claude Sindres; Sandy Vee	Sindres; Vee	7:29

Japan bonus tracks
No.	Title	Length
16.	"When Love Takes Over" (Laidback Luke Remix)	6:06
17.	"Sexy Bitch" (Chuckie & Lil Jon Remix)	5:58

Deluxe Edition bonus disc: One Love mix
No.	Title	Length
1.	"When Love Takes Over" (Electro Extended Version) (featuring Kelly Rowland)	4:24
2.	"Sexy Bitch" (Club Version) (featuring Akon)	3:43
3.	"Memories" (One Love Mix) (featuring Kid Cudi)	4:42
4.	"I Wanna Go Crazy" (Extended Version) (featuring will.i.am)	4:55
5.	"I Gotta Feeling" (One Love Mix) (by The Black Eyed Peas)	4:19
6.	"Choose" (One Love Mix) (featuring Ne-Yo & Kelly Rowland)	3:17
7.	"On the Dancefloor" (Extended Version) (featuring will.i.am & apl.de.ap)	4:16
8.	"Missing You" (Club Version) (featuring Novel)	4:59
9.	"Gettin' Over" (Club Version) (featuring Chris Willis)	3:31
10.	"It's the Way You Love Me" (Final Mix) (featuring Kelly Rowland)	4:12
11.	"One Love" (Extended Version) (featuring Estelle)	4:42
12.	"It's Your Life" (One Love Mix) (featuring Chris Willis)	3:53
13.	"Sound of Letting Go" (One Love Mix) (with Tocadisco featuring Chris Willis)	3:13
14.	"I Need You Now" (One Love Mix) (with Laidback Luke featuring Samantha Jade)	3:14
15.	"How Soon Is Now" (One Love Mix) (with Sebastian Ingrosso & Dirty South featuring Julie McKnight)	5:59
16.	"Toyfriend" (One Love Mix) (with Afrojack featuring Wynter Gordon)	2:52

XXL Edition disc two: Extended / Australian Tour Edition bonus disc
No.	Title	Lyrics	Music	Producer(s)	Length
1.	"When Love Takes Over" (Extended Version) (featuring Kelly Rowland)	Kelly Rowland; Miriam; Olivia Nervo	David Guetta; Frédéric Riesterer	David Guetta; Frédéric Riesterer	7:48
2.	"Gettin' Over" (Extended Version) (featuring Chris Willis)	Chris Willis	David Guetta; Jean-Claude Sindres; Frédéric Riesterer; Sandy Vee	David Guetta; Jean-Claude Sindres; Frédéric Riesterer; Sandy Vee	5:56
3.	"Sexy Bitch" (Extended Version) (featuring Akon)	Giorgio Tuinfort; Aliaune Thiam	David Guetta; Jean-Claude Sindres; Sandy Vee	David Guetta; Jean-Claude Sindres; Sandy Vee	5:13
4.	"Memories" (Extended Version) (featuring Kid Cudi)	Scott Ramon Seguro Mescudi	David Guetta; Frédéric Riesterer	David Guetta; Frédéric Riesterer	5:20
5.	"On the Dancefloor" (Extended Version) (featuring will.i.am and apl.de.ap)	William Adams; Allan Pineda	David Guetta; Jean-Claude Sindres; Sandy Vee	David Guetta; Jean-Claude Sindres; Sandy Vee	5:12
6.	"It's the Way You Love Me" (Extended Version) (featuring Kelly Rowland)	Miriam Nervo; Olivia Nervo	David Guetta; Frédéric Riesterer	David Guetta; Frédéric Riesterer	6:55
7.	"Missing You" (Extended Version) (featuring Novel)	Alonzo Novel Stephenson	David Guetta; Jean-Claude Sindres; Sandy Vee	David Guetta; Jean-Claude Sindres; Sandy Vee	6:18
8.	"How Soon Is Now" (Extended Version) (with Sebastian Ingrosso and Dirty South featuring Julie McKnight)	Jayson Séalee	David Guetta; Frédéric Riesterer; Sebastian Ingrosso; Dragan Roganovic	David Guetta; Dirty South; Sebastian Ingrosso; Frédéric Riesterer	7:05
9.	"One Love" (Extended Version) (featuring Estelle)	Estelle Swaray	David Guetta; Jean-Claude Sindres; Sandy Vee	David Guetta; Jean-Claude Sindres; Sandy Vee	6:48
10.	"I Wanna Go Crazy" (Extended Version) (featuring will.i.am)	William Adams	David Guetta; Jean-Claude Sindres; Sandy Vee	David Guetta; Jean-Claude Sindres; Sandy Vee	6:40
11.	"Sound of Letting Go" (Extended Version) (with Tocadisco featuring Chris Willis)	Miriam Nervo; Olivia Nervo	David Guetta; Tocadisco	David Guetta; Tocadisco	5:24
12.	"Toyfriend" (Instrumental) (with Afrojack featuring Wynter Gordon)	Diana Wynter Gordon; Steven Battey; Carlos Battey	David Guetta; Afrojack; The Jackie Boyz	David Guetta; Afrojack; The Jackie Boyz	3:17
13.	"I Need You Now" (Extended Version) (with Laidback Luke featuring Samantha Jade)	Samantha Jade	David Guetta; Laidback Luke	David Guetta; Laidback Luke	6:26

XXL Edition disc three: B-sides and remixes
No.	Title	Lyrics	Music	Producer(s)	Length
1.	"Montenegro"		David Guetta; Jean-Claude Sindres; Sandy Vee	David Guetta; Jean-Claude Sindres; Sandy Vee	5:58
2.	"Grrrr"		David Guetta; Jean-Claude Sindres; Sandy Vee	David Guetta; Jean-Claude Sindres; Sandy Vee	7:29
3.	"It's Your Life" (featuring Chris Willis)	Miriam Nervo; Olivia Nervo	David Guetta; Jean-Claude Sindres; Sandy Vee	David Guetta; Jean-Claude Sindres; Sandy Vee	3:44
4.	"When Love Takes Over" (Laidback Luke Remix)				6:06
5.	"When Love Takes Over" (Norman Doray & Arno Cost Remix) (Edit)				7:12
6.	"When Love Takes Over" (Albin Myers Remix)				8:27
7.	"When Love Takes Over" (Abel Ramos Paris With Love Mix)				8:12
8.	"Sexy Bitch" (Chuckie & Lil Jon Remix)				5:58
9.	"Sexy Bitch" (Abel Ramos Atlanta With Love Mix)				7:15
10.	"Sexy Bitch" (Koen Groeneveld Remix)				7:16
11.	"Sexy Bitch" (DJ Footloose Remix)				5:44
12.	"Sexy Bitch" (Afrojack Remix)				4:34

XXL Edition disc four: bonus DVD
No.	Title	Length
1.	"One Love: The Documentary"	14:09
2.	"When Love Takes Over" (Video)	3:12
3.	"When Love Takes Over" (Behind The Scenes)	6:24
4.	"Sexy Chick" (Video)	3:18
5.	"Sexy Chick" (Alternate Clip 1)	3:18
6.	"Sexy Chick" (Alternate Clip 2)	3:18
7.	"Sexy Chick" (Alternate Clip 3)	3:18
8.	"Sexy Chick" (Alternate Clip 4)	3:18
9.	"Sexy Chick" (Alternate Clip 5)	3:18
10.	"Sexy Chick" (Behind The Scenes)	7:12

2010 version
No.	Title	Lyrics	Music	Producer(s)	Length
1.	"Sexy Bitch" (featuring Akon)	Giorgio Tuinfort; Aliaune Thiam; Sandy Vee; Jean-Claude Sindres		Vee; Sindres	3:15
2.	"Gettin' Over You" (with Chris Willis featuring Fergie and LMFAO)	Vee; Sindres; Chris Willis; Frédéric Riesterer		Vee; Sindres; Riesterer	3:08
3.	"Memories" (featuring Kid Cudi)	Scott Ramon Seguro Mescudi; Riesterer		Riesterer	3:30
4.	"On the Dancefloor" (featuring will.i.am & apl.de.ap)	William Adams; Allan Pineda; Sindres; Vee		Vee; Sindres	3:45
5.	"When Love Takes Over" (featuring Kelly Rowland)	Miriam Nervo; Olivia Nervo; Kelly Rowland		Frédéric Riesterer	3:12
6.	"Choose" (featuring Ne-Yo & Kelly Rowland)	Riesterer; Shaffer Smith		Riesterer	3:57
7.	"Revolver" (One Love Remix) (vs. Madonna featuring Lil Wayne)	Madonna; Lil Wayne		Riesterer	4:24
8.	"Missing You" (featuring Novel)	Alonzo Stephenson; Sindres; Vee		Vee; Sindres	3:07
9.	"One Love" (featuring Estelle)	Estelle Swaray; Sindres; Vee		Vee; Sindres	4:01
10.	"It's the Way You Love Me" (featuring Kelly Rowland)	Miriam Nervo; Olivia Nervo; Riesterer		Riesterer	4:10
11.	"Love Is Gone" (Fred Riesterer & Joachim Garraud Remix Radio Edit)	Chris Willis		Riesterer; Garraud	4:09
12.	"Acapella" (by Kelis)	Kelis; Riesterer		Riesterer	5:11
13.	"I Gotta Feeling" (FMIF Remix Edit) (by The Black Eyed Peas)	Adams; Pineda; Jaime Gomez; Stacy Ferguson; Riesterer		Riesterer	3:54
14.	"Sound of Letting Go" (with Tocadisco featuring Chris Willis)	Miriam Nervo; Olivia Nervo		Tocadisco	3:46
15.	"I Wanna Go Crazy" (featuring will.i.am)	Adams	Sindres; Vee	Sindres; Vee	3:24

=== One More Love ===
Deluxe edition: disc one
No.	Title	Lyrics	Music	Producer(s)	Length
1.	"When Love Takes Over" (featuring Kelly Rowland)	Kelly Rowland; Miriam Nervo; Olivia Nervo	David Guetta; Frédéric Riesterer	David Guetta; Frédéric Riesterer	3:11
2.	"Gettin' Over" (featuring Chris Willis)	Chris Willis	David Guetta; Jean-Claude Sindres; Frédéric Riesterer; Sandy Vee	David Guetta; Jean-Claude Sindres; Frédéric Riesterer; Sandy Vee	3:02
3.	"Sexy Bitch" (featuring Akon)	Giorgio Tuinfort; Aliaune Thiam	David Guetta; Jean-Claude Sindres; Sandy Vee	David Guetta; Jean-Claude Sindres; Sandy Vee	3:16
4.	"Memories" (featuring Kid Cudi)	Scott Ramon Seguro Mescudi	David Guetta; Frédéric Riesterer	David Guetta; Frédéric Riesterer	3:30
5.	"On the Dancefloor" (featuring will.i.am & apl.de.ap)	William Adams; Allan Pineda	David Guetta; Jean-Claude Sindres; Sandy Vee	David Guetta; Jean-Claude Sindres; Sandy Vee	3:46
6.	"It's the Way You Love Me" (featuring Kelly Rowland)	Miriam Nervo; Olivia Nervo	David Guetta; Frédéric Riesterer	David Guetta; Frédéric Riesterer	4:13
7.	"Missing You" (featuring Novel)	Alonzo Novel Stephenson	David Guetta; Jean-Claude Sindres; Sandy Vee	David Guetta; Jean-Claude Sindres; Sandy Vee	3:08
8.	"Choose" (featuring Ne-Yo & Kelly Rowland)	Shaffer Smith	David Guetta; Frédéric Riesterer	David Guetta; Frédéric Riesterer	3:58
9.	"How Soon Is Now" (with Sebastian Ingrosso & Dirty South featuring Julie McKnight)	Jayson Séalee	David Guetta; Frédéric Riesterer; Sebastian Ingrosso; Dragan Roganovic	David Guetta; Dirty South; Sebastian Ingrosso; Frédéric Riesterer	4:10
10.	"I Gotta Feeling" (FMIF Remix Edit) (by The Black Eyed Peas)	William Adams; Allan Pineda; Jaime Gomez; Stacy Ferguson; David Guetta; Frédéric Riesterer	David Guetta; Frédéric Riesterer	David Guetta; Frédéric Riesterer	3:53
11.	"One Love" (featuring Estelle)	Estelle Swaray	David Guetta; Jean-Claude Sindres; Sandy Vee	David Guetta; Jean-Claude Sindres; Sandy Vee	4:00
12.	"I Wanna Go Crazy" (featuring will.i.am)	William Adams	David Guetta; Jean-Claude Sindres; Sandy Vee	David Guetta; Jean-Claude Sindres; Sandy Vee	3:24
13.	"Sound of Letting Go" (with Tocadisco featuring Chris Willis)	Miriam Nervo; Olivia Nervo	David Guetta; Tocadisco	David Guetta; Tocadisco	3:46
14.	"Toyfriend" (with Afrojack featuring Wynter Gordon)	Diana Wynter Gordon; Steven Battey; Carlos Battey	David Guetta; Afrojack; The Jackie Boyz	David Guetta; Afrojack; The Jackie Boyz	3:17
15.	"If We Ever" (featuring Makeba)	Makeba Riddick	David Guetta; Frédéric Riesterer; Jean-Claude Sindres; Sandy Vee	David Guetta; Frédéric Riesterer; Jean-Claude Sindres; Sandy Vee	4:43

Deluxe edition: disc two
No.	Title	Length
16.	"Who's That Chick?" (featuring Rihanna)	3:19
17.	"Gettin' Over You" (with Chris Willis featuring Fergie & LMFAO)	3:08
18.	"Revolver" (One Love Remix) (vs. Madonna featuring Lil Wayne)	3:19
19.	"Commander" (Kelly Rowland featuring David Guetta)	3:41
20.	"Acapella" (by Kelis)	5:11
21.	"Missing You" (New Version) (featuring Novel)	3:05
22.	"Louder than Words" (with Afrojack featuring Niles Mason)	3:06
23.	"Freak" (by Estelle featuring Kardinal Offishall)	3:45
24.	"Sexy Bitch" (featuring Akon) (Chuckie & Lil Jon Remix)	3:32
25.	"Grrrr"	7:30
26.	"Love Don't Let Me Go (Walking Away)" (UK Radio Edit) (vs. The Egg)	3:11
27.	"The World Is Mine" (featuring JD Davis)	3:40
28.	"Love Is Gone" (Original Mix) (with Chris Willis)	3:06

== Charts ==
=== Weekly charts ===
Chart (2009–2011)	Peak position
Argentinian Albums (CAPIF)	11
Australian Albums (ARIA)	4
Austrian Albums (Ö3 Austria)	3
Belgian Albums (Ultratop Flanders)	2
Belgian Albums (Ultratop Wallonia)	1
Canadian Albums (Billboard)	2
Croatian International Albums (HDU)	1
Danish Albums (Hitlisten)	22
Dutch Albums (Album Top 100)	5
European Albums (Billboard)	1
Finnish Albums (Suomen virallinen lista)	49
French Albums (SNEP)	1
German Albums (Offizielle Top 100)	2
Greek Albums (IFPI)	19
Hungarian Albums (MAHASZ)	1
Irish Albums (IRMA)	3
Italian Albums (FIMI)	5
Mexican Albums (Top 100 Mexico)	12
New Zealand Albums (RMNZ)	2
Norwegian Albums (VG-lista)	16
Polish Albums (ZPAV)	26
Portuguese Albums (AFP)	5
Scottish Albums (Official Charts)	3
South African Albums (RISA)	1
Spanish Albums (Promusicae)	1
Swedish Albums (Sverigetopplistan)	33
Swiss Albums (Schweizer Hitparade)	2
UK Albums (Official Charts)	2
UK Dance Albums (Official Charts)	1
US Billboard 200	70
US Top Dance Albums (Billboard)	3

=== Year-end charts ===
Chart (2009)	Position
Australian Albums (ARIA)	44
Austrian Albums (Ö3 Austria)	22
Belgian Albums (Ultratop Flanders)	52
Belgian Albums (Ultratop Wallonia)	12
Canadian Albums (Billboard)	37
French Albums (SNEP)	10
German Albums (Offizielle Top 100)	50
Swiss Albums (Schweizer Hitparade)	13
UK Albums (OCC)	85
US Top Dance/Electronic Albums (Billboard)	19

Chart (2010)	Position
Australian Albums (ARIA)	39
Austrian Albums (Ö3 Austria)	2
Belgian Albums (Ultratop Flanders)	15
Belgian Albums (Ultratop Wallonia)	4
Canadian Albums (Billboard)	37
Dutch Albums (Album Top 100)	23
European Top 100 Albums	5
French Albums (SNEP)	14
German Albums (Offizielle Top 100)	14
Mexican Albums (AMPROFON)	13
Spanish Albums (PROMUSICAE)	12
Swiss Albums (Schweizer Hitparade)	8
UK Albums (OCC)	68
US Top Dance/Electronic Albums (Billboard)	6

Chart (2011)	Position
Austrian Albums (Ö3 Austria)	38
German Albums (Offizielle Top 100)	84
Spanish Albums (Promusicae)	40
Swiss Albums (Schweizer Hitparade)	34
UK Albums (OCC)	88

Chart (2012)	Position
UK Albums (OCC)	193

Chart (2022)	Position
Belgian Albums (Ultratop Flanders)	179
US Top Dance/Electronic Albums (Billboard)	24

Chart (2024)	Position
Belgian Albums (Ultratop Flanders)	145
Belgian Albums (Ultratop Wallonia)	199
Hungarian Albums (MAHASZ)	89

Chart (2025)	Position
Belgian Albums (Ultratop Flanders)	150
Hungarian Albums (MAHASZ)	78

== Certifications and sales ==
Certifications and sales for One Love
Region	Certification	Certified units/sales
Australia (ARIA)	2× Platinum	140,000^{^}
Austria (IFPI Austria)	2× Platinum	40,000^{*}
Belgium (BRMA)	2× Platinum	60,000^{*}
Canada (Music Canada)	2× Platinum	160,000^{^}
Denmark (IFPI Danmark) reissue - One More Love	Platinum	20,000^{‡}
France (SNEP)	Diamond	500,000^{*}
GCC (IFPI Middle East)	Platinum	6,000^{*}
Germany (BVMI)	5× Gold	500,000^{^}
Hungary (MAHASZ)	Platinum	6,000^{^}
Ireland (IRMA)	Gold	7,500^{^}
Italy (FIMI)	Platinum	70,000^{*}
Mexico (AMPROFON)	Platinum	60,000^{^}
Netherlands (NVPI)	Platinum	50,000^{^}
New Zealand (RMNZ)	Gold	7,500^{^}
New Zealand (RMNZ) One More Love	5× Platinum	75,000^{‡}
Portugal (AFP)	Platinum	7,000^{‡}
Spain (Promusicae)	Platinum	80,000^{^}
Switzerland (IFPI Switzerland)	2× Platinum	60,000^{^}
United Kingdom (BPI)	3× Platinum	900,000^{‡}
Summaries
Europe (IFPI)	Platinum	1,000,000^{*}
^{*} Sales figures based on certification alone.^{^} Shipments figures based on certification alone.^{‡} Sales+streaming figures based on certification alone.

== Release history ==
Standard edition

Release history and formats for One Love
Region	Date	Label	Format
United Kingdom	24 August 2009	Positiva	CD; digital download
Japan	24 August 2009	EMI/SoundTown	CD; digital download
United States	25 August 2009	Astralwerks	CD; digital download
Various	5 April 2019	Parlophone	LP

One More Love

Release history and formats for One More Love
Region	Date	Label	Format
Germany	26 November 2010	EMI	CD; digital download
United Kingdom	29 November 2010	Positiva	CD; digital download
United States	25 January 2011	Astralwerks	CD; digital download
Japan	26 January 2011	EMI/SoundTown	CD; digital download
