= Sexy Bitch =

2009 single by David Guetta

Single by David Guetta featuring Akon

from the album One Love
- Released: 24 July 2009
- Recorded: May 2009
- Genre: Electro hop
- Length: 3:14
- Label: Virgin; EMI
- Songwriters: David Guetta; Aliaune Thiam; Jean-Claude Sindres; Sandy Wilhelm; Giorgio Tuinfort
- Producer: David Guetta

David Guetta singles chronology
"When Love Takes Over" (2009)	"Sexy Bitch" (2009)	"GRRRR" (2009)

Akon singles chronology
"We Don't Care" (2009)	"Sexy Bitch" (2009)	"Let's Get Crazy" (2009)

Music video
- "Sexy Chick" on YouTube

"Sexy Bitch" (also known as "Sexy Chick" in clean versions) is a song by French DJ David Guetta from his fourth studio album One Love (2009). The song features vocals from Senegalese-American singer Akon. It was released as the second single from One Love internationally. The song was serviced to mainstream and rhythmic crossover radios on 1 September 2009, in the United States, through Astralwerks, together with Capitol Records.

It was written by Giorgio Tuinfort, Akon, David Guetta, Jean-Claude Sindres and Sandy Vee; the latter three also produced the song. The song was made in one night after the two main artists met at a concert. The lyrics of "Sexy Bitch" deal with the protagonist's infatuation with a woman. "Sexy Bitch" garnered generally mixed to positive reviews from music critics, who commended the song's production.

The song achieved commercial success worldwide, peaking inside the top five in several countries, including topping the charts in Australia, Austria, Canada, Germany, New Zealand, and the United Kingdom. "Sexy Bitch" peaked at number five on the Billboard Hot 100 and became Guetta's first top five hit in the United States. This is Akon's last top five hit single on Billboard Hot 100 to date.

The song also became his best selling song in the United States, earning a triple platinum certification by the Recording Industry Association of America (RIAA), with sales of 3,507,000 copies as of March 2014. The music video for "Sexy Bitch" features Guetta and Akon at a house party and performing in a concert.

== Background ==
"Sexy Bitch" was written by Giorgio Tuinfort, Akon, David Guetta, Jean-Claude Sindres and Sandy Vee. The production was helmed by Guetta, Sindres and Vee. Guetta, in an interview for MTV News, said the collaboration with Akon came after they met during a performance of "When Love Takes Over" with Kelly Rowland. Akon approached him, asking if they could work together, and Guetta suggested that they should start immediately, so they rented a studio in London and made the song in one night. "Sexy Bitch" was released as the second single from One Love (2009), after the international success of "When Love Takes Over". It was released worldwide as a digital promotional single, which preceded the release One Love, on 24 July 2009.

Astralwerks, together with Capitol Records, solicited the song to mainstream and rhythmic radios on 1 September 2009 in the United States under the name "Sexy Chick". On 7 September 2009, an extended play was serviced to digital retailers, containing an extended version of the song and two remixes by Chuckie, Lil Jon and Koen Groeneveld. That same day, a remixes extended play was released featuring remixes by disc jockeys Afrojack, Abel Ramos, and Groeneveld. On 13 September 2009, an extended play of "Sexy Bitch" was released in the United Kingdom featuring the clean edit and remixes by DJ Footloose, Chuckie, Lil Jon, Abel Ramos, and Groeneveld.

== Composition ==
"Sexy Bitch" runs for 3 minutes and 14 seconds. It features a driving, 8-bit style beat. According to the digital music sheet published at Musicnotes.com by Faber Music, the song is written in a key of B minor. It is set in common time with a fast tempo of 130 beats per minute. Akon's vocals range from a low note of B_{3} to a high note of G_{5}. The song has a basic accompaniment pattern consisting of open fifths instead of chords, in a pattern of B_{5}-D_{5}-G_{5}-D_{5}-E_{5.} The lyrics deal with the protagonist's infatuation with a female, demonstrated in lines like "I'm trying to find the words to describe this girl without being disrespectful," and "nothing you can compare to your neighbourhood whore". Eric Lyndal Martin of PopMatters commented that the song's lines would serve best in "Take Back the Night" ballads than on electronica songs.

== Critical reception ==
Michael Menachem of Billboard praised the song, writing "Don't be surprised if this track takes over dancefloors as the summer ends." Nick Levine of Digital Spy gave "Sexy Bitch" a three star rating, expressing some discontent towards the lyrical content but cited the hook and beats as factors that make the song "bearable". In the review of One Love for the same publication, David Balls offered a less optimistic view of the song, calling it "a throwaway affair with a sell-by-date to rival a pint of milk." David Jeffries of AllMusic noted it as one of the album's highlights, writing that "Akon and guilty pleasure lyrics ... make for a perfect match." Eric Lyndal Martin of PopMatters commented, "the final product makes you wonder just how sexy this bitch actually is," and commended the track for its driving beats, writing that they "make this song a lot of fun."

== Chart performance ==
"Sexy Bitch" was released as the follow-up single to "When Love Takes Over", which was experiencing international success during the time of the single's release. It proved to surpass "When Love Takes Over" in the United States when it debuted on the Billboard Hot 100 at number 56 on the week ending 15 August 2009, becoming Guetta's highest-peaking single on the chart at the time. The song reappeared on the Hot 100 following the single's release to mainstream and rhythmic crossover radio. Within months, the song entered the top 10 tier, where it ascended and descended until 13 February 2010, when it peaked at number five. "Sexy Bitch" exited the Billboard Hot 100 after 40 weeks, and earned a double-platinum certification by the Recording Industry Association of America (RIAA) on 11 February 2010 and a triple-platinum certification on 9 July 2012. It has amassed sales of 3,507,000 digital downloads in the United States by March 2014.

In Canada, the song debuted on the Canadian Hot 100 at number nine, becoming the week's "highest debut". It fell down the chart up until its fourth week, when it hit number 35. The song got its "second wind" in its fifth week, rising to number 21, and eventually reached the summit of the chart, where it stalled for two weeks.

"Sexy Bitch" replicated the chart success of the previous single in international territories. In the Australasian countries, it reached the summit of the singles charts in Australia and New Zealand. However, the song was more successful in Australia, where it logged the top position for seven weeks and lasted on the chart for 38 weeks. The song earned a quintuple-platinum certification by the Australian Recording Industry Association (ARIA), denoting shipments of 350,000 copies. In New Zealand, "Sexy Bitch" lasted three weeks at number one and 23 weeks on the chart. The song shipped 30,000 copies to the country, earning a double platinum certification by the Recording Industry Association of New Zealand (RIANZ).

"Sexy Bitch" showed similar standings in the European countries, continuing Guetta's mainstream success around the world. The song topped the charts in four countries and reached the top five in nine. In the United Kingdom, it entered the singles chart at number 21 on 21 August 2009. The song rose to number one in the following week becoming Guetta's second and Akon's third UK number one, it lasted 40 weeks on the chart, amassing sales of 740,000 copies in the United Kingdom. "Sexy Bitch" showed the most longevity in Switzerland, where it logged 77 weeks on the singles chart. The song reached a peak of number two, where it stalled for three consecutive weeks in October 2009. It eventually earned a quadruple-platinum certification by International Federation of the Phonographic Industry Switzerland (IFPI Switzerland), denoting shipments of 80,000 copies. "Sexy Bitch" experienced a successful chart run in Sweden, entering the singles chart at number eight and after more than two months, reached a peak at number two. The song lasted 55 weeks on the chart, 25 of which were spent inside the top 10. In Austria, the song reached the summit of the singles chart, where it stayed for three consecutive weeks.

== Music video ==
Akon wakes up to find a message made of lipstick that says "find me at the pool party" and a photo.

The video was directed by Stephen Schuster. The video starts with a plane coming and girls in bikinis are seen tanning and swimming. The camera switches to Akon who wakes up and finds pictures of his date from David Guetta's pool party. He then finds lipstick note on his mirror that reads "find me at pool party" with yet another photo. As the party starts, people enter; a group of teenage boys are denied entry but they employ various methods to get in. The camera switches to Akon again, who is shown singing underwater. The camera flicks to Guetta arriving meeting up with Akon, who then grabs Guetta and they throw each other in the pool. The party continues as Akon pushes more people in, girls dance and Akon with Guetta are shown to be having a water fight. The scene then skips to the Pacha Night Club in Ibiza Town, to David Guetta’s "Fuck Me, I'm Famous" night where David Guetta is performing with Tocadisco, and Akon is walking in from the back, where he meets some girls. Akon then arrives and performs "Sexy Bitch" A light up man in blue and green appears. Girls are shown dancing and Akon does a crowd surf before the video ends. At the end, Akon is seen sleeping in the bed waking up finding pictures but goes back to sleep.

The video was filmed in Pacha Ibiza, Barcelona, Spain, St. Julian's, Malta and Swindon, England around 27 July 2009.

An alternate version for a censored version of the song ("Sexy Chick") depicts two girls in Akon's bedroom; one is taking Polaroid photos of the other. They even take photos of themselves in Akon's bed while he sleeps. Akon's bed is covered in photos, and as the girls leave, the one most heavily photographed writes in lipstick on the bathroom mirror, "find me at pool party". She attaches another photo and leaves a lipstick impression of her lips on the mirror before she goes to the pool party. Akon then wakes up. The rest of the video is much like the other version, with a few scenes cut or added at the pool party and the club. For example, the underwater singing scene is omitted.

=== Controversy ===
On 24 March 2010, Buddhist groups in Sri Lanka have stated the music video was considered offensive, due to the fact that the Buddha statue is found in several shots in the background throughout. With protests held along with demanding a concert cancellation, the Sri Lankan Government prohibited Akon from entering Sri Lanka with a visa. In response, Akon said "I was not aware that the statue was even on the set of the video until now. I would never set out to offend or desecrate anyone’s religion or religious beliefs... I myself am a spiritual man, so I can understand why they are offended, but violence is never the answer and I am disheartened."

== Credits and personnel ==
- Songwriting — Giorgio Tuinfort, Aliaune Thiam, David Guetta, Jean-Claude Sindres, Sandy Vee
- Production — David Guetta, Jean-Claude Sindres, Sandy Vee

Credits adapted from the liner notes of One Love, Virgin Records, EMI France.

== Track listing ==
- UK CD single
1. "Sexy Bitch" – 3:14
2. "Sexy Bitch" (extended version) – 5:12
- French CD single
1. "Sexy Bitch" – 3:14
2. "Sexy Bitch" (Chuckie & Lil Jon Remix) – 5:58
3. "Sexy Chick" (US version) – 3:13
4. "Sexy Bitch" (video)
- European CD single
1. "Sexy Bitch" (Chuckie & Lil Jon Remix) – 5:58
2. "Sexy Bitch" (Koen Groeneveld Remix) – 7:15
3. "Sexy Bitch" (Koen Groeneveld Remix) (David Guetta Vocal Re-Edit) – 7:30
4. "Sexy Bitch" (Abel Ramos Atlanta With Love Remix) – 7:13
5. "Sexy Bitch" (Afrojack Remix) – 4:45
6. "Sexy Bitch" (extended version) – 5:12
7. "Sexy Bitch" – 3:14
- US CD single
1. "Sexy Bitch" (Chuckie & Lil Jon Remix) – 5:58
2. "Sexy Bitch" (Koen Groeneveld Remix) – 7:15
3. "Sexy Bitch" (Koen Groeneveld Remix) (David Guetta Vocal Re-Edit) – 7:30
4. "Sexy Bitch" (Abel Ramos Atlanta With Love Remix) – 7:13
5. "Sexy Bitch" (Afrojack Remix) – 4:45
6. "Sexy Bitch" (Footloose Remix) – 5:12
7. "Sexy Bitch" (album version) – 3:14
8. "Sexy Bitch" (extended version) – 5:12
9. "Sexy Bitch" (extended instrumental) – 5:12
10. "Sexy Chick" (clean album version) – 3:14
11. "Sexy Chick" (clean album version extended) – 5:12

== Charts ==
=== Weekly charts ===
Weekly chart performance for "Sexy Bitch"
Chart (2009–11)	Peak position
Australia (ARIA)	1
Austria (Ö3 Austria Top 40)	1
Belgium (Ultratop 50 Flanders)	1
Belgium (Ultratop 50 Wallonia)	1
Canada Hot 100 (Billboard)	1
Canada CHR/Top 40 (Billboard)	1
Canada Hot AC (Billboard)	3
CIS Airplay (TopHit)	2
Czech Republic Airplay (ČNS IFPI)	1
Denmark (Tracklisten)	2
Finland (Suomen virallinen lista)	2
France (SNEP)	2
France Download (SNEP)	1
Germany (GfK)	1
Hungary (Dance Top 40)	1
Hungary (Rádiós Top 40)	6
Hungary (Single Top 40)	4
Ireland (IRMA)	2
Israel International Airplay (Media Forest)	1
Italy (FIMI)	8
Luxembourg Digital Songs (Billboard)	1
Mexico Anglo (Monitor Latino)	7
Netherlands (Dutch Top 40)	3
Netherlands (Single Top 100)	4
New Zealand (Recorded Music NZ)	1
Poland Dance (ZPAV)	1
Romania Airplay (Media Forest)	2
Russia Airplay (TopHit)	2
Spain (Promusicae)	5
Sweden (Sverigetopplistan)	2
Switzerland (Schweizer Hitparade)	2
UK Singles (Official Charts)	1
US Billboard Hot 100	5
US Adult Pop Airplay (Billboard)	30
US Dance Club Songs (Billboard)	1
US Hot Latin Songs (Billboard)	22
US Pop Airplay (Billboard)	3
US Rhythmic Airplay (Billboard)	3

=== Year-end charts ===
Chart (2009)	Position
Australia (ARIA)	2
Belgium (Ultratop 50 Flanders)	14
Belgium (Ultratop 50 Wallonia)	9
Brazil (Crowley)	95
Canada (Canadian Hot 100)	16
CIS (TopHit)	24
France (SNEP)	16
Germany (Media Control GfK)	14
Hungary (Dance Top 40)	19
Hungary (Rádiós Top 40)	72
Italy (FIMI)	33
Netherlands (Dutch Top 40)	10
Netherlands (Single Top 100)	23
New Zealand (RIANZ)	3
Russia Airplay (TopHit)	34
Sweden (Sverigetopplistan)	13
Switzerland (Schweizer Hitparade)	15
UK Singles (OCC)	12
US Hot Dance Club Songs (Billboard)	6

Chart (2010)	Position
Australia (ARIA)	84
Austria (Ö3 Austria Top 40)	58
Belgium (Ultratop 50 Flanders)	43
Belgium (Ultratop 50 Wallonia)	28
Brazil (Crowley)	40
Canada (Canadian Hot 100)	28
Germany (Media Control GfK)	79
Hungary (Dance Top 40)	15
Hungary (Rádiós Top 40)	46
Italy (FIMI)	64
Romania (Romanian Top 100)	67
Russia Airplay (TopHit)	102
Spain (PROMUSICAE)	12
Sweden (Sverigetopplistan)	42
Switzerland (Schweizer Hitparade)	26
UK Singles (OCC)	174
US Billboard Hot 100	26
US Hot Latin Songs (Billboard)	70
US Mainstream Top 40 (Billboard)	16
US Rhythmic (Billboard)	16

Chart (2013)	Position
South Korea (Gaon International Chart)	192

=== Decade-end charts ===
Chart (2000–09)	Position
Australia (ARIA)	8
Germany (Media Control GfK)	73
UK Singles (OCC)	88

== Certifications ==
Region	Certification	Certified units/sales
Australia (ARIA)	5× Platinum	350,000^{^}
Austria (IFPI Austria)	Platinum	30,000^{*}
Belgium (BRMA)	Platinum	30,000^{*}
Canada (Music Canada)	Gold	40,000^{*}
Denmark (IFPI Danmark)	2× Platinum	180,000^{‡}
Finland (Musiikkituottajat)	Gold	6,735
France (SNEP)	Diamond	400,000^{*}
Germany (BVMI)	Platinum	300,000^{^}
Italy (FIMI)	Platinum	20,000^{*}
New Zealand (RMNZ)	4× Platinum	120,000^{‡}
Spain (Promusicae)	Platinum	40,000^{*}
Sweden (GLF)	Platinum	20,000^{‡}
Switzerland (IFPI Switzerland)	4× Platinum	120,000^{^}
United Kingdom (BPI)	3× Platinum	1,800,000^{‡}
United States (RIAA)	3× Platinum	3,507,000
Streaming
Denmark (IFPI Danmark)	Gold	900,000^{†}
^{*} Sales figures based on certification alone.^{^} Shipments figures based on certification alone.^{‡} Sales+streaming figures based on certification alone.^{†} Streaming-only figures based on certification alone.

== Release history ==
Region	Date	Format
Worldwide	24 July 2009	Digital download
United States	28 July 2009	Digital download
United States	1 September 2009	Airplay

== See also ==
- List of number-one hits of 2009 (Austria)
- List of number-one singles of 2009 (Australia)
- List of Hot 100 number-one singles of 2009 (Canada)
- List of European number-one hits of 2009
- List of number-one hits of 2009 (France)
- List of number-one hits of 2009 (Germany)
- List of 2000s number-one singles (New Zealand)
- List of UK Singles Chart number ones of the 2000s
- List of number-one dance singles of 2009 (U.S.)
- List of number-one dance airplay hits of 2009 (U.S.)
- List of Ultratop 40 number-one singles of 2009
- List of Ultratop 50 number-one singles of 2009
- List of number-one dance singles of 2010 (Poland)
