= Fuck Me I'm Famous =

Electronic dance music compilation album

Fuck Me I'm Famous is a series of electronic dance music compilation albums by the French DJ David Guetta. His wife at the time, Cathy Guetta, collaborated in the production. The first album in the series was released in 2003. The albums have traditionally been released during the summer months of their respective years.

== Fuck Me I'm Famous (2003) ==
Fuck Me I'm Famous

Compilation album by David Guetta
- Released: July 1, 2003
- Recorded: 2001–2003
- Genre: House
- Length: 72:08
- Labels: Virgin Music; Universal Music Group; Ministry of Sound (Aus.)
- Producers: Cathy & David Guetta

David Guetta chronology
Fuck Me I'm Famous (2003)	Fuck Me I'm Famous, Vol. 2 (2005)

Singles from Fuck Me I'm Famous 2003
- 1. "Just for One Day (Heroes)" Released: June 16, 2003

The very first volume in the series was issued on July 1, 2003, via Virgin Music. A two-disc edition, including a compilation DVD, was later issued by Ultra Records. "Just For One Day (Heroes)" was released as a single from the album on June 16, 2003.

1. "Just for One Day (Heroes)" – David Guetta vs. Bowie
2. "Shout" – E-Funk featuring Donica Thornton
3. "Shake It" – Lee Cabrera
4. "Fuckin' Track" – Da Fresh
5. "Satisfaction" – Benny Benassi
6. "Distortion" – David Guetta featuring Chris Willis
7. "Dancing in the Dark" – 4 Tune 500
8. "Heart Beat" – Africanism by Martin Solveig
9. "Sunshine" – Tomaz vs. Filterheadz
10. "Sometimes – Deux
11. "If You Give Me The Love I Want" – Crydajam
12. "Ghetto Blaster" – Twin Pitch
13. "Stock Exchange" – Miss Kittin & The Hacker
14. "Who Needs Sleep Tonight" – Bob Sinclar
15. "Bye Bye Superman" – Geyster
16. "Bucci Bag" – Andrea Doria

Deluxe edition bonus DVD

1. "F.M.I.F Compilation 2003" (Compilation Video)

== Fuck Me I'm Famous Vol. 2 (2005) ==
Fuck Me I'm Famous, Vol. 2

Compilation album by David Guetta
- Released: July 18, 2005; August 29, 2005 (International Version)
- Recorded: 2003–2005
- Genre: House
- Length: 65:08
- Label: Virgin Records
- Producers: David & Cathy Guetta

David Guetta chronology
Fuck Me I'm Famous (2003)	Fuck Me I'm Famous, Vol. 2 (2005)	Fuck Me I'm Famous – Ibiza Mix 06 (2006)

The second volume in the series was first issued on July 18, 2005, before an expanded version was issued on August 29, 2005, containing two discs, and altering the track listing.

1. "Zookey – Lift Your Leg Up" – Yves Larock Feat. Roland Richards
2. "Freek U" – Bon Garçon
3. "Most Precious Love" – Blaze featuring Barbara Tucker
4. "Everybody" – Martin Solveig
5. "Pump Up the Jam" – D.O.N.S. featuring Technotronic
6. "Geht's Noch" – Roman Flugel
7. "Not So Dirty" – Who's Who
8. "The World Is Mine" – David Guetta featuring JD Davis
9. "Shot Me Down" – Audio Bullys featuring Nancy Sinatra
10. "I Like the Way (You Move)" – BodyRockers
11. "Say Hello" – Deep Dish
12. "In Love With Myself" – David Guetta featuring JD Davis
13. "Miss Me Blind" – Culture Club
14. "Rock the Choice" – Joachim Garraud
15. "Manga" – H Man
16. "Louder Than A Bomb" – Tiga
17. "The Drill" – The Drill
18. "Infatuation" – Jan Francisco and Joseph Armani

International version

- Disc One
1. "Most Precious Love" – Blaze & UDA, Barbara Tucker
2. "Gabryelle" – DJ Spen & DJ Technic
3. "Yeah" – Steve Angello & Sebastian Ingrosso
4. "Pump Up The Jam" – DONS & Technotronic
5. "Geht's Noch" – Roman Flugel
6. "Not So Dirty" – Who's Who
7. "The World Is Mine" – David Guetta & JD Davis (FMIF Remix)
8. "Miss Me Blind" – Culture Club (David Guetta & Joachim Garraud FMIF Mix)
9. "Rock The Choice" – Joachim Garraud (Sebastian Ingrosso Remix)
10. "Manga" – H-Man
11. "Avalon" – Juliet (FMIF Remix)
12. "Drill" – Drill
13. "In Love With Myself" – David Guetta (Robbie Rivera Remix)
14. "Waiting In The Darkness" – Erick Morillo & Leslie Carter (Harry Romero Remix)
- Disc Two
1. "Louder Than A Bomb" – Tiga
2. "We Interrupt This Program" – Coburn
3. "First Day" – Timo Maas (Buick Project Dub)
4. "Wait And See" – Tiefschwarz & Chikinki
5. "Sword Fight" – Lower East Side
6. "It's Magic" – Fat Phaze (Lottie & Serge Santiago's Mix)
7. "Bright Lights Fading" – Slam & Billie Ray Martin
8. "Sweat On The Walls" – John Tejada
9. "Safari" – Andre Kraml & Schad Privat
10. "Du What U Du" – Yoshimoto (Trente Moller Remix)
11. "You Made A Promise" – Shiny Grey (FMIF Mix)
12. "Believe" – Chemical Brothers
13. "Infatuation" – Jan Francisco & Joseph Armani
14. "Fast Track" – De Crecy, Etienne & Super Discount 2
15. "Closer To Me" – Chab & JD Davis

== Fuck Me I'm Famous – Ibiza Mix 2006 (2006) ==
Fuck Me I'm Famous – Ibiza Mix 06

Compilation album by David Guetta
- Released: June 26, 2006; July 10, 2006 (International version)
- Recorded: 2004–2006
- Genre: House
- Length: 73:07
- Label: Virgin Music
- Producers: Cathy & David Guetta

David Guetta chronology
Fuck Me I'm Famous, Vol. 2 (2005)	Fuck Me I'm Famous – Ibiza Mix 06 (2006)	Fuck Me I'm Famous – International, Vol. 2: Ibiza Mix 08 (2008)

Singles from Fuck Me I'm Famous – Ibiza Mix 06
- 1. "Love Don't Let Me Go (Walking Away)" Released: August 14, 2006

The third volume in the series was issued on June 26, 2006 via Virgin Records. An international version, containing an extended version of the album, was made available on July 10, 2006, via Ministry of Sound. A DVD accompaniment was released beside the album, however, some editions carry the DVD as a bonus disc. "Love Don't Let Me Go (Walking Away)" was released as a single from the album on August 14, 2006 after its appearance on the Citroën adverts in the United Kingdom.

1. "Walking Away" (Tocadisco Radio Edit) – The Egg
2. "Love Don't Let Me Go" – David Guetta
3. "No More Conversation" – Freeform Five
4. "Same Man" (Extended Vocal Mix) – Till West and DJ Delicious
5. "Something Better" – Martin Solveig
6. "Love Sensation" – Eddie Thoenick and Kurd Maverick
7. "World, Hold On – Children of the Sky" – Bob Sinclar
8. "In My Arms" (Tocadisco Remix) – Mylo
9. "Get It On (Summer Love)" – Joe Vannelli featuring Rochelle Flemming
10. "5 in the Morning" – Richard F.
11. "The Rub (Never Rock)" – Kurd Maverick
12. "Dance I Said" – Erick Morillo and Diddy
13. "Toop Toop" – Cassius
14. "Fuck Swedish" – Logic
15. "Teasing Mr. Charlie" – Steve Angello
16. "Time" – David Guetta

International version

- Disc One
1. "Love Don't Let Me Go (Walking Away)" – David Guetta
2. "Same Man" – Till West and DJ Delicious
3. "Ascension" – Denis Naidanow
4. "Tell Me Why" – Supermode
5. "It's Too Late" – Evermore vs Dirty South
6. "World, Hold On – Children of the Sky" – Bob Sinclar
7. "You're No Good for Me" – Tocadisco
8. "Love Sensation '06" (HI_TACK Burnin' Up Club Mix) – Loleatta Holloway
9. "Banquet" (Phones Disco Edit) – Bloc Party
10. "5 in the Morning" – Richard F.
11. "Otherwize Then" – Steve Angello & Laidback Luke
12. "Teasing Mr. Charlie" – Steve Angello
13. "World Cup" – Kiko
- Disc Two
1. "Get It On (Summer Love)" – Joe Vannelli featuring Rochelle Flemming
2. "Save My Soul" – Logic
3. "He Is" – Copyright featuring Song Williamson
4. "Always and Forever" – Chocolate Puma
5. "Luna" – Andy Cato
6. "Transatlantic Flight" (Axwell Remix) – Lorraine
7. "Last Dub on Earth" (Arnaud Rebotini Remix) – Black Strobe
8. "Dance I Said" – Erick Morillo and Diddy
9. "Click" – Steve Angello & Sebastian Ingrosso
10. "Da Hool" – Da Hool
11. "Bleeep!" – Martijn Ten Velden & Lucien Foort
12. "Fucking Swedish" – Logic

Deluxe edition bonus DVD

1. "Fuck Me I'm Famous" (Documentary)
2. "Just A Little More Love" (Music Video)
3. "Love Don't Let Me Go" (Music Video)
4. "Just For One Day (Heroes)" (Music Video)
5. "Money" (Music Video)
6. "The World Is Mine" (Music Video)
7. "Time" (Music Video)

== Fuck Me I'm Famous – Ibiza Mix 2008 (2008) ==
Fuck Me I'm Famous – International, Vol. 2: Ibiza Mix 08

Compilation album by David Guetta
- Released: June 16, 2008; July 28, 2008 (International Version)
- Recorded: 2006–2008
- Genre: House
- Length: 74:09
- Label: Virgin Records
- Producers: David & Cathy Guetta

David Guetta chronology
Fuck Me I'm Famous – Ibiza Mix 06 (2006)	Fuck Me I'm Famous – International, Vol. 2: Ibiza Mix 08 (2008)	Fuck Me I'm Famous – Ibiza Mix 2009 (2009)

The fourth volume in the series was first released on June 16, 2008 on Virgin Records, before an international expanded version was released on July 28, 2008, by Ministry of Sound.

1. "Keep On Rising" – Ian Carey featuring Michelle Shellers
2. "No Stress" – Laurent Wolf featuring Eric Carter
3. "Tomorrow Can Wait" – David Guetta & Chris Willis vs. El Tocadisco
4. "Sucker" (Fred Pellichero Remix) – Dim Chris
5. "Toys Are Nuts" – Gregor Salto and Chuckie
6. "Move Move" – Robbie Rivera
7. "Outro Lugar" (Tocadisco's Nunca Chove Floripa Mix) – Prok and Fitch present Salomé de Bahia
8. "Delirious" (Laidback Luke Remix) – David Guetta featuring Tara McDonald
9. "Apocalypse" – Arno Cost and Norman Doray
10. "Toca's Miracle" (Inpetto 2008 Mix) – Fragma
11. "So Strong" (Inpetto Remix) – Meck featuring Dino
12. "Pjanoo" – Eric Prydz
13. "Runaway" (Albin Myers Remix) – Tom Novy featuring Abigail Bailey
14. "Man with the Red Face" – Mark Knight and Funkagenda
15. "Pears" (Vocal) – Federico Franchi
16. "The Rock" – Joachim Garraud
17. "Jack Is Back" – David Guetta

International version

- Disc One
1. "Tomorrow Can Wait" – David Guetta & Chris Willis vs. El Tocadisco
2. "Sucker" (Fred Pellichero Remix) – Dim Chris
3. "Toys Are Nuts" – Gregor Salto and Chuckie
4. "Move Move" – Robbie Rivera
5. "Outro Lugar" (Tocadisco's Nunca Chove Floripa Mix) – Prok and Fitch present Salomé de Bahia
6. "Delirious" (Laidback Luke Remix) – David Guetta featuring Tara McDonald
7. "The One" (Joachim Garraud & David Guetta Remix) – Sharam featuring Daniel Bedingfield
8. "3 Minutes To Explain" – Fedde le Grand & Funkerman feat. Dorothy & Andy Sherman
9. "Klack" – Who's Who
10. "What The F***" – Funkagenda
11. "Bleep" – Sandy Vee
12. "Radio" (Shinichi Osawa Remix) – Felix da Housecat
13. "Jack Is Back" – David Guetta
14. "Pears" (Vocal) – Federico Franchi
15. "The Rock" – Joachim Garraud
16. "Rock 'N' Rave" – Benny Benassi
- Disc Two
1. "Pjanoo" – Eric Prydz
2. "Runaway" (Albin Myers Remix) – Tom Novy featuring Abigail Bailey
3. "Toca's Miracle" (Inpetto 2008 Mix) – Fragma
4. "Miracle" (Mischa Daniels Remix) – The Frenchmakers featuring Andrea Britton
5. "Golden Walls" – Dahlbäck and Cost
6. "TQ" – Arias
7. "So Strong" (Inpetto Remix) – Meck featuring Dino
8. "Caribe" – Tristan Garner presents Caribe
9. "You" – Steve Mac and Paul Harris (FPS Remix)
10. "Humanoidz" (Arno Cost & Norman Doray Remix) – Tom De Neef and Laidback Luke
11. "Ring Road" (Laidback Luke Remix) – Underworld
12. "Beautiful Lie" (Joachim Garraud Remix) – Keemo and Tim Royko featuring Cosmo Klein
13. "Man with the Red Face" – Mark Knight and Funkagenda

== Fuck Me I'm Famous – Ibiza Mix 2009 (2009) ==
Fuck Me I'm Famous – Ibiza Mix 2009

Compilation album by David Guetta
- Released: August 21, 2009
- Recorded: 2007–2009
- Genre: House
- Length: 76:03
- Label: Positiva Records
- Producers: David & Cathy Guetta

David Guetta chronology
Fuck Me I'm Famous – International, Vol. 2: Ibiza Mix 08 (2008)	Fuck Me I'm Famous – Ibiza Mix 2009 (2009)	Fuck Me I'm Famous – Ibiza Mix 2010 (2010)

Singles from Fuck Me I'm Famous – Ibiza Mix 2009
- 1. "GRRRR" Released: October 19, 2009

The Ibiza Mix 2009 was released on August 21, 2009, via Positiva Records. "GRRRR" was released as a single from the album on October 19, 2009. In France, the album was released on June 12, 2009, containing one bonus track and a compilation DVD mix.

1. "When Love Takes Over" (Electro Extended Mix) – David Guetta featuring Kelly Rowland
2. "Believe" (2009 Remix) – Ministers de la Funk vs. Antoine Clamaran & Sandy Vee feat. Jocelyn Brown
3. "Boom Boom Pow" (Electro-Hop Remix) – The Black Eyed Peas
4. "Leave The World Behind" – Axwell, Sebastian Ingrosso, Steve Angello, Laidback Luke feat. Deborah Cox
5. "Riverside" – Sidney Samson
6. "Day 'n' Nite" (Bingo Players Remix) – Kid Cudi vs. Crookers
7. "Thief" – Afrojack
8. "Let The Bass Kick" – Chuckie
9. "My God" – Laidback Luke
10. "Rockerfeller Skank" – Fatboy Slim vs. Koen Groeneveld
11. "Amplifier" (Club Mix) – F.L.G
12. "Where Is Love" – David Guetta ft Max C
13. "GRRRR" – David Guetta
14. "Cyan" – Arno Cost
15. "The Answer" (Dabruck & Klein Extended Remix) – Joachim Garraud
16. "Times Like These" (Club Mix) – Albin Myers

Deluxe Edition Bonus DVD

1. "F.M.I.F Summer of Love" (Compilation Video)

== Fuck Me I'm Famous – Ibiza Mix 2010 (2010) ==
Fuck Me I'm Famous – Ibiza Mix 2010

Compilation album by David Guetta
- Released: July 26, 2010
- Recorded: 2007–2009
- Genre: House
- Length: 68:09
- Label: Positiva Records
- Producers: Cathy & David Guetta

David Guetta chronology
Fuck Me I'm Famous – Ibiza Mix 2009 (2009)	Fuck Me I'm Famous – Ibiza Mix 2010 (2010)	Fuck Me I'm Famous – Ibiza Mix 2011 (2011)

The Ibiza Mix 2010 was released on July 26, 2010, via Positiva Records.

1. "Gettin' Over You" (Extended) – David Guetta & Chris Willis featuring Fergie & LMFAO
2. "On The Dancefloor" (Extended) – David Guetta featuring will.i.am & apl.de.ap
3. "Rock That Body" – Black Eyed Peas
4. "Flashback" (David Guetta Remix) – Calvin Harris
5. "Louder than Words" – David Guetta & Afrojack featuring Niles Mason
6. "I'm In The House" (Sharam Lovefest Remix) – Steve Aoki featuring Zuper Blahq
7. "Rave'n'Roll" – Steve Angello
8. "I'll Be There" – Afrojack & Gregor Salto
9. "Walk With Me" (Axwell & Daddy's Groove Remix) – Prok & Fitch
10. "50 Degrees" – David Guetta
11. "The World Is Yours" – Sidney Samson
12. "Who's In The House" (Chuckie Remix) – Chris Kaeser
13. "Put Your Hands Up" – Koen Groeneveld & Mark Knight
14. "Hey Hey" (Riva Starr Paradise Garage Remix) – Dennis Ferrer
15. "Glow" – Cirez D
16. "Strobe" – Deadmau5

== Fuck Me I'm Famous – Ibiza Mix 2011 (2011) ==
Fuck Me I'm Famous – Ibiza Mix 2011

Compilation album by David Guetta
- Released: July 18, 2011
- Recorded: 2009–2011
- Genre: House
- Length: 70:24
- Label: Positiva
- Producers: David & Cathy Guetta

David Guetta chronology
Fuck Me I'm Famous – Ibiza Mix 2010 (2010)	Fuck Me I'm Famous – Ibiza Mix 2011 (2011)	Fuck Me I'm Famous – Ibiza Mix 2012 (2012)

The Ibiza Mix 2011 was released on July 18, 2011 via Positiva Records.

1. "Where Them Girls At" (Nicky Romero Remix) – David Guetta featuring Flo Rida & Nicki Minaj
2. "Sweat" (David Guetta & Afrojack Dub Mix) – Snoop Dogg
3. "Rapture" (Avicii New Generation Extended FMIF Remix) – Nadia Ali
4. "Beautiful People" (Felix Cartal Club Mix) – Chris Brown featuring Benny Benassi
5. "Turn Up The Volume" – AutoErotique
6. "Pandemonium" – David Guetta & Afrojack featuring Tara McDonald
7. "Replica" – Afrojack
8. "Little Bad Girl" (Instrumental Club Mix) – David Guetta
9. "Detroit Bounce" – Chuckie
10. "Duel" – Third Party
11. "The Moment" (Steve Angello Edit) – Tim Mason
12. "Bassline" – David Guetta
13. "Lise" – Arno Cost
14. "Sinnerman" – Sean Miller & Daniel Dubb
15. "Doin' Ya Thang" – Oliver

== Fuck Me I'm Famous – Ibiza Mix 2012 (2012) ==
Fuck Me I'm Famous – Ibiza Mix 2012

Compilation album by David Guetta
- Released: June 29, 2012
- Recorded: 2011–2012
- Genre: House
- Length: 68:31
- Label: EMI
- Producers: David & Cathy Guetta

David Guetta chronology
Fuck Me I'm Famous – Ibiza Mix 2011 (2011)	Fuck Me I'm Famous – Ibiza Mix 2012 (2012)	Fuck Me I'm Famous – Ibiza Mix 2013 (2013)

The Ibiza Mix 2012 was released on June 29, 2012 via EMI Records.

1. "Turn Me On" (Michael Calfan Remix) – David Guetta featuring Nicki Minaj
2. "Can't Stop Me" – Afrojack & Shermanology
3. "Wild One Two" – Jack Back featuring David Guetta, Nicky Romero & Sia
4. "Million Voices" – Otto Knows
5. "Silhouettes" – Avicii
6. "The Veldt" – Deadmau5
7. "Feel So Close" – Calvin Harris
8. "Metropolis" – David Guetta & Nicky Romero
9. "Get Low" – Sidney Samson
10. "Cascade" – Tommy Trash
11. "Greyhound" – Swedish House Mafia
12. "Quasar" – Hard Rock Sofa
13. "Bong" – Deniz Koyu
14. "WTF!?" – Nicky Romero featuring ZROQ
15. "I Can Only Imagine" (David Guetta & Daddy's Groove Remix) – David Guetta featuring Chris Brown & Lil Wayne

== Fuck Me I'm Famous – Ibiza Mix 2013 (2013) ==
Fuck Me I'm Famous – Ibiza Mix 2013

Compilation album by David Guetta
- Released: June 24, 2013
- Recorded: 2012–2013
- Genre: House
- Length: 74:07
- Label: Warner Music
- Producers: David & Cathy Guetta

David Guetta chronology
Fuck Me I'm Famous – Ibiza Mix 2012 (2012)	Fuck Me I'm Famous – Ibiza Mix 2013 (2013)

Singles from Fuck Me I'm Famous – Ibiza Mix 2013
- 1. "Ain't a Party" Released: June 17, 2013

The Ibiza Mix 2013 was released on June 24, 2013 via EMI Records.

1. "Play Hard" (Albert Neve Remix) – David Guetta featuring Ne-Yo & Akon
2. "Sweet Nothing" – Calvin Harris featuring Florence Welch
3. "I Could Be the One" – Avicii vs. Nicky Romero
4. "Easy" – Mat Zo & Porter Robinson
5. "If I Lose Myself" – OneRepublic vs. Alesso
6. "Symphonica" – Nicky Romero
7. "Head Up" – Arno Cost
8. "Boom!" – Stevie Mink, Ivan Gough & Steve Bleas
9. "Cannonball" – Showtek & Justin Prime / (alternate Version: "Vertigol" – Daddy's Groove & Cryogenix)
10. "Ain't a Party" – David Guetta & Glowinthedark featuring Harrison
11. "Rasputin" – Hard Rock Sofa
12. "Wakanda" – Dimitri Vegas & Like Mike
13. "Who" – Tujamo & Plastik Funk
14. "This Is What It Feels Like" (David Guetta Remix) – Armin van Buuren featuring Trevor Guthrie
15. "Alive" (David Guetta Remix) – Empire of the Sun
16. "Dynamo" – Laidback Luke & Hardwell

=== Charts ===
Chart (2013)	Peak position
South African Albums (RISA)	14
