= Joachim Garraud =

French DJ and music producer (born 1968)

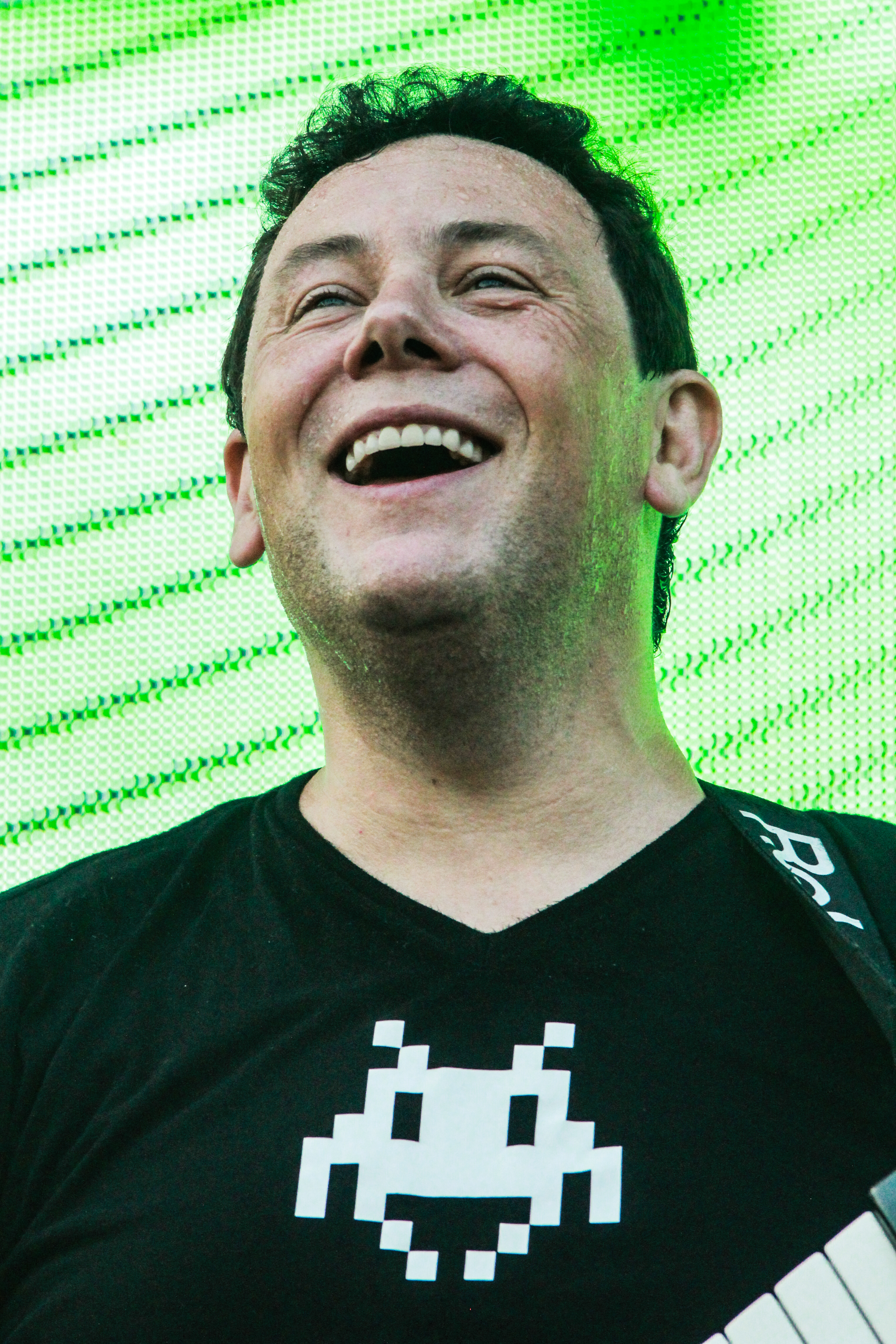
- Garraud in 2013

Background information
- Born: Joachim André Garraud; 27 September 1968 (age 57); Nantes, Pays de la Loire, France
- Genres: Electro house, new beat, acid house
- Occupations: Disc jockey, record producer, remixer
- Years active: 1989–present
- Labels: Gum, Universal, Toolroom, Ultra Records
- Website: joachimgarraud.com

Joachim André Garraud (French pronunciation: [ʒɔakim ɑ̃dʁe ɡaʁo]; born 27 September 1968) is a French DJ, music producer and remixer from Nantes. He is a producer of artists such as Paul Johnson, Deep Dish, David Bowie, Orchestral Manoeuvres in the Dark (OMD), Kylie Minogue, Mylène Farmer, Cassius, Saffron Hill and Culture Club. Known for his many collaborations with other DJs and musicians such as Jean-Michel Jarre, Bob Sinclar and David Guetta (with whom he co-founded the Gum Records label). Garraud hosted the weekly show Zemixx radio show and podcast from 2005 until 2025.

== Biography ==
After having perfected his piano and percussion for seven years at the conservatory, Garraud decided to move toward electronic music. He moved to Paris in 1989 to work as producer for Maxximum radio station. He then began to DJ at The Boy, the Parisian club that first initiated the discovery of the techno phenomenon in France.

Garraud created his own recording studio in the middle of Paris, which allowed him to remix, compose or produce artists such as David Guetta, Jean-Michel Jarre, Paul Johnson, Deep Dish, David Bowie, OMD, Kylie Minogue, Mylène Farmer, Cassius, Cerrone, Moby, Robbie Rivera. Nowadays, he uses a Space Invader mascot to identify with his fan community.

In February 2026, Garraud published an extensive 528-page autobiography titled "I Love My DJ Life". The book chronicles his career trajectory from his early beginnings at the Moulin des Rochettes in Nantes to his established residency in Ibiza and his subsequent move to Los Angeles in 2013. The publication serves as a comprehensive record of his collaborative work with artists like David Guetta and Jean-Michel Jarre, as well as his long-standing contributions to Radio FG and the Ibiza Fever compilations.

== Discography ==
=== Studio albums ===
- 2008: Invasion
- 2009: Toolroom Knights Mixed by Joachim Garraud
- 2011: Invasion 2011
- 2016: 96/24
- 2017: OVP, Oscillation, Vibration, Pulsation - vinyl with illustrations from François Schuiten
- 2021: OVP 2, OVP, Oscillation, Vibration, Pulsation

=== Singles ===
- 2004: "Geisterbahn"
- 2005: "Akia"
- 2005: "Rock the Choice"
- 2005: "Acid Beat" (with Julien Creance)
- 2005: "Space Invaders Are Back"
- 2006: "Back from Space"
- 2006: "I Was Alive" (with Wize)
- 2007: "Street's Sound"
- 2007: "Instruments" (as Lufkrawerk)
- 2007: "X"
- 2014: "One Life" (with Chris Willis)
- 2014: "Theory of Everything"
- 2014: "Everybody" (with Perry & Etty Farrell)
- 2017: "Beautiful" (with Ridwello & Chris Willis)
- 2018: "Maximus" (feat. A Girl and a Gun)
- 2019: "3Acid3 (Rezone Remix)"
- 2019: Signal (EP)
- 2023: "Runaway Heartbreak" (with Miriam Love)

=== Production credits ===
Title	Year	Artist	Album/Single	Credits
"Métamorphoses"	2000	Jean-Michel Jarre	Album	Drum programming, sound design, additional keyboards
"Just a little more love"	2001	David Guetta feat. Chris Willis	Single	Co-producer, co-writer
"Batucada"	2001	B.T.A	Single	Co-producer, co-writer
"Hysteria"	2002	Cerrone	Album	Mixed by
"Geometry of Love"	2002	Jean-Michel Jarre	Album	Mixed by
"Just a Little More Love"	2002	David Guetta	Album	Co-producer, co-writer
"Love Don't Let Me Go"	2002	David Guetta feat. Chris Willis	Single	Co-producer, co-writer
"People Come People Go"	2002	David Guetta feat. Chris Willis	Single	Co-producer, co-writer
"Bootleg Maxi : Kid Vicious 001"	2002	Kid Vicious Versus Madonna	Single	Co-producer, co-writer
"Bootleg Maxi : Kid Vicious 002"	2002	Kid Vicious Versus Bee Gees	Single	Co-producer, co-writer
"Bootleg Maxi : Kid Vicious 003"	2003	Kid Vicious Versus Depeche Mode	Single	Co-producer, co-writer
"Give Me Something"	2003	David Guetta feat Barbara Tucker	Single	Co-producer, co-writer
"It's About You"	2003	Geyster	Single	Co-producer, co-editor
"Bye bye Superman"	2003	Geyster	Single	Co-producer, co-editor, (David Guetta & Joachim Garraud Fuck Me I'm Famous Remix)
"Just For one Day"	2003	David Guetta versus David Bowie	Single	Co-producer, (David Guetta & Joachim Garraud Fuck Me I'm Famous Remix)
"High Energy"	2004	In Da Mix Feat. Chynna Blue	Single	Producer, mixed by, keyboard, drums
"Guetta Blaster"	2004	David Guetta	Album	Co-producer, co-writer
"Stay"	2004	David Guetta feat. Chris Willis	Single	Co-producer, co-writer
"Money"	2004	David Guetta feat. Chris Willis	Single	Co-producer, co-writer
"The World Is Mine"	2004	David Guetta feat. JD Davis	Single	Co-producer, co-writer
"In Love with Myself"	2004	David Guetta feat. JD Davis	Single	Co-producer, co-writer
"AERO"	2004	Jean-Michel Jarre	Album	Sound design, mixed by (5.1 surround mix)
"I love 1984"	2004	Geyster	Album	Co-production, co-editor
"John Clay"	2004	Geyster	Single	Co-production, editor
"Feel it"	2004	Antoine Clamaran featuring Lulu Huges	Single	Vocal arrangement, remix
"Compilation: ClubFG / Zemixx"	2005	Joachim Garraud	Album	Production
"WhiteFloor / Backdraft Co"	2005	Ralph 'n' Jo	Single	Co-producer, co-writer, mixed by, mastered by
"Summer Moon"	2005	Tim Deluxe, Bob Sinclar, David Guetta, Joachim Garraud, Ben Onono	Single	Co-producer, co-writer
"Heatwave"	2005	Julien Creance	Single	Co-producer, remix
"Infactuation"	2005	Jan Franscisco & Joseph Armani	Single	Co-producer, remix
"Danger"	2005	Mone	Single	Co-producer, remix
"Time"	2006	David Guetta feat. Chris Willis	Single	Co-producer, co-writer
"Save My Soul"	2006	Logic (J. Garraud & D. Guetta)	Single	Co-producer, co-writer
"Fucking Swedish"	2006	Logic (J. Garraud & D. Guetta)	Single	Co-producer, co-writer
"World, Hold On"	2006	Bob Sinclar	Single	Vocal arrangement, remix
"Love Is Gone"	2007	David Guetta feat. Chris Willis	Single	Co-producer, co-composer (Fred Rister & Joachim Garraud Remix)
"MODULAR CALIFORNIA VIBES"	2023	MCV feat. Hugo Paris, Joachim Garraud, Trovarsi & Franck Martin	Album	Co-producer, co-composer

=== Remixes ===
- 1991: Serge Gainsbourg - "Requiem Pour un Con" (Remix 91)"
- 2001: Pet Shop Boys — "Break 4 Luv"
- 2002: Kylie Minogue — "Love at first sight"
- 2002: Imagination - "Flashback 2003 Remix"
- 2002: Cassius - "The Sound of Violence David Guetta & Joachim Garraud Fuck Me I'm Famous Remix)"
- 2002: Antoine Clamaran - "Release Yourself (Joachim Garraud Remix)"
- 2003: Kylie Minogue — "Come into My World (Joachim Garraud Mix radio edit)"
- 2003: Paul Johnson Feat Chyna Blue - "Doo Wap (Joachim Garraud Remix)"
- 2003: Ricky Martin - "Jaleo (Joachim Garraud Remix)"
- 2003: Darren Hayes - "Crush (Joachim Garraud Remix)"
- 2003: Saffron Hill / Tim Deluxe - "Love is Always There(Joachim Garraud Remix)"
- 2003: Orchestral Manoeuvres in the Dark - "Enola Gay 2003 (David Guetta & Joachim Garraud Fuck Me I'm Famous Remix)"
- 2004: Muttonheads - "Smashing Music (Joachim Garraud Remix)"
- 2004: Deep Dish - "Flashdance (David Guetta & Joachim Garraud Fuck Me I'm Famous Remix)" - nominated Grammy Awards Best Remixed Recording, Non Classical
- 2004: Bob Sinclar - "You Could be my Lover (Joachim Garraud Remix)"
- 2005: Mylène Farmer - "Fuck Them All (Mother f... dub mix)"
- 2005: Eurythmics — "I've Got A Life (David Guetta Club)"
- 2005: Eurythmics — "I've Got A Life (David Guetta Dub)"
- 2005: Moby — "Beautiful (David Guetta & Joachim Garraud Fuck Me I'm Famous Remix)"
- 2005: Culture Club — "Miss Me Blind Remix"
- 2005: Skin - "Alone in my room (Joachim Garraud Remix)"
- 2005: Benny Benassi - "Who's your Daddy? (David Guetta & Joachim Garraud Fuck Me I'm Famous Remix)"
- 2005: Da Hool - "Meet Her at Love Parade 2005 (Joachim Garraud Remix)"
- 2005: Cerrone - "Supernature (Joachim Garraud Remix)"
- 2005: Robbie Rivera - "Some kinds of Heaven (Joachim Garraud Remix)"
- 2005: Shiny Grey - "U made a promise (Joachim Garraud Remix)"
- 2005: Anaklein - "Lena (Joachim Garraud Remix)"
- 2005: Juliet - "Avalon (David Guetta & Joachim Garraud Fuck Me I'm Famous Remix)"
- 2006: Philippe Katerine vs. Joachim Garraud — “Louxor, J'adore (Space Invaders Remix)”
- 2006: Nick In Time — "Emergency (Joachim Garraud Remix)"
- 2006: David Guetta vs. The Egg — "Love Don't Let Me Go (Walking Away) (David Guetta & Joachim Garraud Fuck Me I'm Famous Mix)"
- 2007: Depeche Mode - "Joachim Garraud vs. Depeche Mode — Enjoy the Silence"
- 2007: Téo Moss - "U Start (Joachim Garraud Remix)"
- 2008: Kylie Minogue — "Wow (David Guetta & Joachim Garraud Fuck Me I'm Famous Remix)"
- 2008: Sharam – "The One (David Guetta & Joachim Garraud Space Invaders Remix)"

== Filmography ==
- 27 October 2022 - Modular California Vibes - director, composer with Hugo Paris, Trovarsi and Franck Martin - 4 producers go on an adventure in the California desert to create 4 tracks in 4 different locations in 4 days aboard a solar powered mobile studio.
