= Guetta Blaster =

Studio album by David Guetta
- Released: 7 June 2004
- Recorded: 2003–04
- Genres: House; electro house; tech house
- Labels: Virgin; Gum Prod
- Producers: Joachim Garraud; David Guetta

David Guetta chronology
Just a Little More Love (2002)	Guetta Blaster (2004)	Pop Life (2007)

Singles from Guetta Blaster
- 1. "Money" Released: 9 April 2004; 2. "Stay" Released: 13 September 2004; 3. "The World Is Mine" Released: 22 November 2004; 4. "In Love With Myself" Released: 18 March 2005

Professional ratings
Review scores
Source	Rating
Allmusic	3.5/5 stars

Guetta Blaster is the second studio album by French DJ and record producer David Guetta. It was released on 7 June 2004 by Virgin Records and Gum Prod.

== Track listing ==
No.	Title	Length
1.	"Money" (featuring Chris Willis & Moné)	3:06
2.	"Stay" (featuring Chris Willis)	3:30
3.	"The World Is Mine" (featuring JD Davis)	3:38
4.	"Used to Be the One" (featuring Chris Willis)	4:06
5.	"Time" (featuring Chris Willis)	4:07
6.	"Open Your Eyes" (featuring Stereo MCs)	4:15
7.	"ACDC"	4:01
8.	"In Love with Myself" (featuring JD Davis)	4:26
9.	"Higher" (featuring Chris Willis)	3:43
10.	"Movement Girl" (featuring James Perry)	4:01
11.	"Get Up" (featuring Chris Willis)	3:03
12.	"Last Train" (featuring Ms. Thing)	3:07

French special edition bonus tracks
No.	Title	Length
13.	"Old School Acid" (featuring James Perry)	3:18
14.	"Stay" (Remix Edit) (featuring Chris Willis)	3:27

French deluxe edition bonus tracks
No.	Title	Length
13.	"Stay" (Fuzzy Hair Remix Edit) (featuring Chris Willis)	4:45
14.	"The World Is Mine" (Deep Dish Remix Edit) (featuring JD Davis)	4:07
15.	"Old School Acid" (featuring James Perry)	3:18

European edition
No.	Title	Length
1.	"Higher" (featuring Chris Willis)	3:43
2.	"Just a Little More Love" (Wally Lopez Remix Edit) (featuring Chris Willis)	3:45
3.	"The World Is Mine" (featuring JD Davis)	3:38
4.	"Used To Be The One" (featuring Chris Willis)	4:06
5.	"Stay" (featuring Chris Willis)	3:30
6.	"Time" (featuring Chris Willis)	4:07
7.	"Money" (featuring Chris Willis & Moné)	3:06
8.	"Open Your Eyes" (featuring Stereo MCs)	4:15
9.	"ACDC"	4:01
10.	"Last Train" (featuring Ms. Thing)	3:07
11.	"Movement Girl" (featuring James Perry)	4:01
12.	"In Love with Myself" (featuring JD Davis)	4:26
13.	"Get Up" (featuring Chris Willis)	3:03

American edition
No.	Title	Length
1.	"Love Don't Let Me Go (Walking Away)" (featuring Chris Willis vs. The Egg)	3:12
2.	"Just a Little More Love" (Wally Lopez Remix Edit) (featuring Chris Willis)	3:45
3.	"The World Is Mine" (F*** Me I'm Famous Radio Edit) (featuring JD Davis)	3:13
4.	"Stay" (featuring Chris Willis)	3:30
5.	"Used To Be The One" (featuring Chris Willis)	4:06
6.	"Higher" (featuring Chris Willis)	3:43
7.	"Time" (featuring Chris Willis)	4:07
8.	"Money" (featuring Chris Willis & Moné)	3:06
9.	"Open Your Eyes" (featuring Stereo MCs)	4:15
10.	"Last Train" (featuring Miss Thing)	3:07
11.	"In Love with Myself" (featuring JD Davis)	4:26
12.	"Get Up" (featuring Chris Willis)	3:03
13.	"The World Is Mine" (Paul Oakenfold Downtempo Mix) (featuring JD Davis)	3:46

French deluxe edition bonus DVD
No.	Title	Length
1.	"DJ Mix" (audio)
2.	"David Guetta Interview"
3.	"video mix"
4.	"Stay" (music video)
5.	"Money" (music video)

== Charts ==
=== Weekly charts ===
Chart (2004)	Peak position
Belgian Albums (Ultratop Wallonia)	29
French Albums (SNEP)	11
Swiss Albums (Schweizer Hitparade)	45

=== Year-end charts ===
Chart (2004)	Position
French Albums (SNEP)	103
Chart (2005)	Position
French Albums (SNEP)	123

== Certifications ==
Region	Certification	Certified units/sales
France (SNEP)	Platinum	200,000^{*}
^{*} Sales figures based on certification alone.
