= Cathy and David Guetta =

Cathy and David Guetta is a husband and wife duo sometimes releasing music jointly. Refer to:

- Cathy Guetta
- David Guetta
