= The World Is Mine (David Guetta song) =

2004 single by David Guetta

Single by David Guetta featuring JD Davis

from the album Guetta Blaster
- Released: 22 November 2004
- Recorded: 2004
- Genre: House, tech house
- Length: 3:40
- Label: Perfecto, Gum
- Songwriters: David Guetta, David Henrard, Jean-Charles Carré, Joachim Garraud, Xavier Clayton
- Producers: David Guetta, Joachim Garraud

David Guetta singles chronology
"Stay" (2004)	"The World Is Mine" (2004)	"In Love with Myself" (2005)

Music video
- "The World Is Mine" on YouTube

"The World Is Mine" is a song by French DJ David Guetta, featuring vocals from Belgian singer JD Davis. The track was released as the third single from Guetta's second studio album, Guetta Blaster on 22 November 2004. Three years later, in 2007, the track was released as a single in the United States as the follow-up to "Love Don't Let Me Go (Walking Away)", along with the Guetta Blaster album. The background samples "Someone Somewhere in Summertime" by Simple Minds in 1982. Thanks in part to support from Dance radio outlets like BPM, "The World is Mine" would end up giving Guetta his first number-one single on the Billboard Hot Dance Airplay chart in June 2007. The track was also the first single and only single from Guetta Blaster to be released in the United Kingdom.

== Music video ==
The video features a man with a woman as a stripper in three different scenes; a hospital with him as a panda and her as a nurse, a high school with him as a student and her as a teacher, and in an office with him as a businessman and her as a businesswoman. The woman does a strip performance for each, after which he is seen at a strip club dancing with several women, including the three main ones, who seductively dance around him.

This music video uses a portion of the track's Fuck Me I'm Famous remix version.

== Track listing ==
- Spanish CD single
  1. "The World Is Mine" (F*** Me I'm Famous Radio Edit) – 3:12
  2. "The World Is Mine" (Deep Dish Remix) – 9:17
  3. "The World Is Mine" (F*** Me I'm Famous Remix) – 8:14
  4. "The World Is Mine" (Blackstrobe Remix) – 8:11
- French CD single
  1. "The World Is Mine" (F*** Me I'm Famous Remix) – 8:14
  2. "The World Is Mine" (Deep Dish Remix) – 9:17
  3. "The World Is Mine" (Blackstrobe Remix) – 8:11
  4. "The World Is Mine" (Clamaran Dub) – 8:39
  5. "The World Is Mine" (album version) – 3:38
- French CD single – Limited Enhanced Edition
  1. "The World Is Mine" (F*** Me I'm Famous Radio Edit) – 3:12
  2. "The World Is Mine" (Original Mix) – 3:40
  3. "The World Is Mine" (Deep Dish Remix Edit) – 4:07
  4. "The World Is Mine" (music video)
- UK CD single
  1. "The World Is Mine" (F*** Me I'm Famous Remix) – 8:14
  2. "The World Is Mine" (Deep Dish Remix) – 9:17
  3. "The World Is Mine" (Blackstrobe Remix) – 8:11
  4. "The World Is Mine" (Clamaran Dub) – 8:39
  5. "The World Is Mine" (album version) – 3:38
  6. "The World Is Mine" (music video)
- American CD single
  1. "The World Is Mine" (Radio Edit) – 3:13
  2. "The World Is Mine" (F*** Me I'm Famous Remix) – 8:14
  3. "The World Is Mine" (Paul Oakenfold's Downtempo Mix) – 3:45
  4. "The World Is Mine" (Paul Oakenfold's Downtempo Mix With Sweetie Rap) – 2:54
  5. "The World Is Mine" (Cedric Gervais Remix) – 9:30
  6. "The World Is Mine" (Deep Dish Remix) – 9:17
  7. "The World Is Mine" (Kenneth Thomas Remix) – 9:12
  8. "The World Is Mine" (Liam Shachar Mix) – 6:53
  9. "The World Is Mine" (Nat Monday Remix) – 6:20
- L'Oreal promotional CD single
  1. "The World Is Mine" (album version) – 3:38
  2. "Love Don't Let me Go" (edit) – 3:39
  3. "Just A Little More Love" (Wally Lopez Remix Edit) – 3:45

== Charts ==
=== Weekly charts ===
Chart (2004–2007)	Peak position
Belgium (Ultratop 50 Flanders)	13
Belgium (Ultratop 50 Wallonia)	15
CIS Airplay (TopHit)	4
Europe (European Hot 100)	62
France (SNEP)	16
Greece (IFPI)	26
Hungary (Dance Top 40)	3
Hungary (Single Top 40)	9
Ireland (IRMA)	39
Netherlands (Dutch Top 40)	27
Romania (Romanian Top 100)	42
Russia Airplay (TopHit)	3
Scottish Singles Sales (Official Charts)	43
Spain (Promusicae)	10
Switzerland (Schweizer Hitparade)	40
UK Singles (Official Charts)	49
UK Dance (Official Charts)	2
US Dance Airplay (Billboard)	1

=== Year-end charts ===
Chart (2004)	Position
CIS (TopHit)	9
Russia Airplay (TopHit)	5

=== Decade-end charts ===
Decade-end chart performance for "The World Is Mine"
Chart (2000–2009)	Position
CIS Airplay (TopHit)	107
Russia Airplay (TopHit)	85
