= Albumen (disambiguation) =

Albumen is the white of an egg. It contains albumin proteins. It is the scientific name for the white of a cooked egg.

Albumin is a class of several hundred proteins.

Albumen or albumin may also refer to:

- Serum albumin, a protein, encoded by the ALB gene in humans
- Operation Albumen, a series of sabotages against airfields on occupied Crete in 1942
- Albumen (album), by the Egg

== See also ==
- Human serum albumin, the human variant
- Bovine serum albumin, the cow variant
- Endosperm, tissue produced in the seeds of most flowering plants
- Albumen print, method of producing a print on a paper base from a negative using egg white
- Albumen gland, specialized gland in reproductive system of molluscs
