= What's Eating You =

- Genre: Reality television
- Country of origin: United States
- Original language: English
- No. of seasons: 1
- No. of episodes: 6

Production
- Executive producers: JD Roth; Todd A. Nelson; Adam Greener
- Camera setup: Multiple
- Running time: 42 minutes
- Production company: 3 Ball Productions

Original release
- Network: E!
- Release: October 13 – November 17, 2010

What's Eating You is an American reality documentary series about people with eating disorders. The series premiered on October 13, 2010, on the E! cable network.

== Production ==
The reality documentary series was announced in April 2010. The six-part television series features people who have compulsive eating disorders; each episode introduces two people whose lives are threatened by harmful eating habits and features doctors trying to help them to overcome the disorders.

JD Roth, one of the producers of the series, said, "One might assume that a show about severe eating disorders would focus solely on participants' bizarre behavior around food; but this show really is about the incredible fortitude and strength of people with intense obstacles to overcome [...]. We're very proud to be working with E! [...] in offering hope and a path to recovery."

== Episodes ==
No.	Title	Original release date
1	"Adrienne & Danni"	October 13, 2010
A woman attempts to get free of bulimia while a dancer fights anorexia.
2	"Marc & Kristy"	October 20, 2010
A man suffers from bulimia induced by his childhood memories. A former model regularly engages in binge eating and purging behaviors.
3	"Gaby & Jennifer"	October 27, 2010
A woman suffers from long-term binge-purge disorder caused by her family. A female comedian's binging disorder is getting out of control.
4	"Mona & Andrew"	November 3, 2010
A singer fights the overeating disorder. A young man battles bulimia and has troubles getting support.
5	"Amanda & Nickey"	November 10, 2010
A former model is fearful of seeing her new body and is afraid of coming back to her old habits. A young mom struggles with her multiple disorders and believes it may affect her family.
6	"Melissa & Claudine"	November 17, 2010
A woman is about to overcome anorexia, although still struggles. Other case includes another woman who is addicted to eating chalk.
