= Just for One Day (Heroes) =

Single by David Guetta vs. Bowie

from the album Fuck Me I'm Famous 2003
- Released: 16 June 2003
- Recorded: 2003
- Genre: House; pop rock
- Length: 3:00
- Label: Virgin
- Songwriter: David Bowie
- Producers: David Guetta; Joachim Garraud

David Guetta singles chronology
"Give Me Something" (2002)	"Just for One Day (Heroes)" (2003)	"Money" (2004)

"Just for One Day (Heroes)" is a house song performed by French DJ David Guetta, featuring vocals from English singer David Bowie. The song was released as the lead single from Guetta's compilation album Fuck Me I'm Famous in June 2003, and it was also credited as the fifth single from his debut studio album, Just a Little More Love. The song contains a sample from Bowie's 1970s track "Heroes". The track was officially credited to 'David Guetta vs. Bowie'. It peaked at No. 73 on the UK Singles Chart in July 2003. The music video for "Just for One Day (Heroes)" can be found on YouTube. It features a group of people partying at a rave, with Guetta performing the track in the background.

It was initially made as an unauthorized remix, and it is seen as one of the tracks that helped to launch Guetta into the mainstream.

== Track listing ==
- German CD single
1. "Just For One Day (Heroes)" (radio edit) – 3:00
2. "Just For One Day (Heroes)" (extended version) – 6:39
3. "Distortion" (Maxi Vocal Remix) – 7:02
- French CD single
1. "Just For One Day (Heroes)" (radio edit) – 3:00
2. "Just A Little More Love" (Wally Lopez Remix Edit) – 3:45
3. "Distortion" (Maxi Vocal Remix) – 7:02
4. "Just For One Day (Heroes)" (music video) – 3:00

== Charts ==
Chart (2004)	Peak position
France (SNEP)	54
Italy (FIMI)	40
UK Dance (Official Charts)	2
UK Singles (OCC)	73
