= Money (David Guetta song) =

Single by David Guetta featuring Chris Willis and Moné

from the album Guetta Blaster
- Released: 9 April 2004
- Recorded: 2004
- Genre: House, dance-rock
- Length: 3:05 (radio edit)
- Label: Perfecto; Gum
- Songwriters: David Guetta; Joachim Garraud; Toufik Traikia; Richard Deschamps; Mohamed Claude Njoya Mefira
- Producers: David Guetta; Joachim Garraud

David Guetta singles chronology
"Just for One Day (Heroes)" (2003)	"Money" (2004)	"Stay" (2004)

"Money" is a house song performed by French DJ David Guetta, featuring vocals from American singer Chris Willis and American rapper Moné. The track was released as the lead single from Guetta's second studio album, Guetta Blaster on 9 April 2004. The single was not released in the United Kingdom. A music video for the track exists, but it does not feature Guetta, Willis or Mone. It features a tutorial on printing fake money. The single achieved its best success on the Belgian Singles Chart, peaking at number 12 there.

== Track listing ==
- French CD single
1. "Money" (extended version) – 4:45
2. "Money" (Wally Lopez Remix) – 3:33
3. "Money" (Dancefloor Killa Remix) – 3:47
4. "Money" (radio edit) – 3:05

== Charts ==
Chart (2004)	Peak position
Belgium (Ultratip Bubbling Under Wallonia)	12
France (SNEP)	63
Switzerland (Schweizer Hitparade)	52
