= Albumen (album) =

1996 studio album by UK band The Egg

Studio album by The Egg
- Released: 1996
- Genre: House, nu-funk, big beat, alternative dance

Professional ratings
Review scores
Source	Rating
Muzik	3/5 stars

Albumen is the debut studio album by British band the Egg, released in 1996.

== Track listing ==
All songs written by Ned Scott, Maff Scott, Mark Revell and David Gaydon except Roche which is also by Dave Motion.

1. "The Fat Boy Goes to the Cinema"
2. "Time to Enjoy"
3. "Get Some Money to Get Her"
4. "Bend"
5. "Jam Tomorrow"
6. "Big Duck"
7. "Sunglasses"
8. "Roche (Don't You Ever Stop)"
9. "Shopping"
10. "Shoplifting"
11. "284 Windows and a Door"

Notes:

- At the end of the last track "284 Windows and a Door", there are a few seconds of silence before a very short untitled track plays.
