= Stay (David Guetta song) =

Single by David Guetta featuring Chris Willis

from the album Guetta Blaster
- Released: September 13, 2004
- Recorded: 2004
- Genre: House
- Length: 3:11 (radio edit)
- Label: Perfecto; Gum
- Songwriters: David Guetta; Chris Willis; Jean-Charles Carré; Joachim Garraud
- Producers: David Guetta; Joachim Garraud

David Guetta singles chronology
"Money" (2004)	"Stay" (2004)	"The World Is Mine" (2004)

Music video
- "David Guetta - Stay (Official Video)" on YouTube

"Stay" is a house song performed by French DJ David Guetta, featuring vocals from American singer Chris Willis. The track was released as the second single from Guetta's second studio album, Guetta Blaster on September 13, 2004. The single was not released in the United Kingdom. In certain territories, the single was released as a double A-side with the French only single "Money". A music video for the track exists, but it does not feature either Guetta or Willis. The single found the most success on the Belgian Singles Chart, peaking at #10.

== Music video ==
The music video has been viewed over a million times on YouTube. The clip was filmed in June 2004. in Spain, throughout the clip, we follow the story of a young couple.

== Track listing ==
- Spanish CD single
1. "Stay" (album version) – 3:28
2. "Stay" (Fuzzy Hair Remix) – 4:57
3. "Stay" (Kiko, Guetta & Garraud Remix) – 8:04
4. "Stay" (Kiko Dub Remix) – 6:18
- French CD single
1. "Stay" (radio edit) – 3:11
2. "Money" (radio edit) – 3:05
3. "Stay" (remix edit) – 3:28
4. "Money" (Dancefloor Killa Remix) – 7:07
5. "Money" (video) – 3:19
- 12" single
1. "Stay" (Fuzzy Hair Remix) - 7:15
2. "Stay" (Le Knight Club Remix) - 6:20

== Charts ==
Chart (2004)	Peak position
Belgium (Ultratip Bubbling Under Flanders)	10
Belgium (Ultratop 50 Wallonia)	19
CIS Airplay (TopHit)	38
France (SNEP)	18
Hungary (Dance Top 40)	29
Spain (Promusicae)	10
Switzerland (Schweizer Hitparade)	82

2019 chart performance for "Stay"
Chart (2019)	Peak position
Russia Airplay (TopHit)	60
