= Love Don't Let Me Go (Walking Away) =

Single by David Guetta vs. The Egg

from the album Fuck Me I'm Famous - Ibiza Mix 06
- Released: 14 August 2006
- Recorded: 2005
- Genre: Electro house
- Length: 3:16
- Label: Virgin/Gusto
- Songwriters: David Guetta; Ned Scott; Benji Vaughan; Chris Willis; Jean-Charles Carré; Joachim Garraud; Maff Scott, Matt White

David Guetta singles chronology
"In Love with Myself" (2005)	"Love Don't Let Me Go (Walking Away)" (2006)	"Love Is Gone" (2007)

The Egg singles chronology
"Walking Away" (2006)	"Love Don't Let Me Go (Walking Away)" (2006)	"Nothing" (2006)

Music video
- "Love Don't Let Me Go (Walking Away)" on YouTube

"Love Don't Let Me Go (Walking Away)" was released as a mash-up of DJ Tocadisco's remix of The Egg's single "Walking Away" with the vocals of Chris Willis from David Guetta's 2002 single "Love Don't Let Me Go". The mash-up was first performed live by French DJ and Guetta's production partner Joachim Garraud, though several people claimed to have done it before. It was featured in an advert for the Citroën C4, and peaked at number three on the UK Singles Chart, Guetta's first top ten hit in that country. It was released as the single of Guetta's 2006 compilation album Fuck Me I'm Famous - Ibiza Mix 06 and also features on the 2007 Reissue Edition of Guetta Blaster and as the bonus track of Guetta's third studio album Pop Life.

== Music video ==
The music video, shot at Heygate Estate in South London, is choreographed around breakdancing and parkour with a comedic aspect. The clip starts with two boys playing basketball while two girls walk past. One of each of the two notice each other and are obviously infatuated. They walk up to the cage between them and when their hands touch they begin to dance intensely. They continue to dance energetically and spontaneously until they touched someone else, at which time the "energy" would transfer to them and that person would start to dance while the person who touched them stopped. The boy and the girl kiss at the end of the video.

== Track listing ==
CD single

1. "Love Don't Let Me Go (Walking Away)" (UK radio edit) – 3:13
2. "Love Don't Let Me Go (Walking Away)" (Famous radio edit) – 3:08
3. "Love Don't Let Me Go (Walking Away)" (Joachim Garraud & David Guetta's F*** Me I'm Famous Mix) – 6:23
4. "Walking Away" (Tocadisco Remix) – 6:53

12" single

1. "Love Don't Let Me Go (Walking Away)" (Joachim Garraud & David Guetta's F*** Me I'm Famous Mix) – 6:23
2. "Love Don't Let Me Go" (Joe T. Vannelli Remix) - 8:04
3. "Walking Away" (Tocadisco Remix) – 6:53

== Charts ==
Chart (2006)	Peak position
Australia (ARIA)	32
Austria (Ö3 Austria Top 40)	74
Belgium (Ultratop 50 Flanders)	42
Belgium (Ultratop 50 Wallonia)	13
Finland (Suomen virallinen lista)	13
France (SNEP)	11
Germany (GfK)	50
Greece (IFPI)	4
Hungary (Rádiós Top 40)	2
Ireland (IRMA)	12
Italy (FIMI)	9
Netherlands (Single Top 100)	60
Spain (PROMUSICAE)	6
Sweden (Sverigetopplistan)	25
Switzerland (Schweizer Hitparade)	19
UK Singles (OCC)	3
UK Dance (OCC)	1
UK Indie (OCC)	1
US Dance/Mix Show Airplay (Billboard)	4

=== Year-end charts ===
Chart (2006)	Position
UK Singles (OCC)	46

== Certifications ==
Region	Certification	Certified units/sales
United Kingdom (BPI)	Silver	200,000^{‡}
^{‡} Sales+streaming figures based on certification alone.
