= Euro hop =

×Blame it on the French if you must, but 2010 may well go down as the year mainstream America went not just Europop, but "Euro-hop."

Four out of Billboard's Top 20 singles this week bear the hallmarks of an unmistakable new Eurodance-meets-urban sound that is all but taking over Top 40 and urban radio.

It's a club-influenced soundtrack for teens and 20-somethings filled with sparkling synth hooks and throbbing beats more Berlin than Baltimore, yet Middle America can't get enough.

"It's absolutely unbelievable," said Paris-based DJ and producer David Guetta via phone late last month. "When I started this, I could never imagine that one day this sound would become a new format in America."

Guetta, whose collaboration with Flo Rida ("Club Can't Handle Me ") is currently No. 12 on Billboard's Hot 100 chart, is arguably the leader of a new Euro-hop sound that pairs American rappers with European-style house music.

"My goal was to create a bridge between European DJ culture and American urban culture," he said. "When we did 'I Got a Feeling' [his chart-topping mega-hit with the Black Eyed Peas] and it became bigger than we ever thought, I thought it's really crazy and I never could have imagined that it was gonna be that way in America."
