= In Love with Myself =

Single by David Guetta featuring JD Davis

from the album Guetta Blaster
- Released: 18 March 2005
- Recorded: 2004
- Genre: Electro-house
- Length: 4:26
- Label: Perfecto, Gum
- Songwriters: David Guetta, David Henrard, Jean Charles Carre, Joachim Garraud, Xavier Clayton
- Producers: David Guetta, Joachim Garraud

David Guetta singles chronology
"The World Is Mine" (2004)	"In Love with Myself" (2005)	"Love Don't Let Me Go (Walking Away)" (2006)

Audio video
- "In Love With Myself" on YouTube

"In Love with Myself" is a house song performed by French DJ David Guetta, featuring vocals from Belgian singer JD Davis, released as the fourth and final single from Guetta's second studio album, Guetta Blaster on 18 March 2005. The single was only released in France, however, charted elsewhere due to strong downloads. No music video exists for the track.

== Track listing ==
- French CD single
1. "In Love with Myself" (Benny Benassi Remix) – 6:34
2. "In Love with Myself" (Fuzzy Hair Remix) – 8:02
3. "In Love with Myself" (Robbie Rivera Remix) – 8:36
4. "In Love with Myself" (David Guetta & Joachim Garraud Remix) – 7:47
5. "In Love with Myself" (JD Davis Remix) – 5:37

== Charts ==
=== Weekly charts ===
Weekly chart performance for "In Love with Myself"
Chart (2004–2006)	Peak position
Belgium (Ultratip Bubbling Under Flanders)	6
Belgium (Ultratip Bubbling Under Wallonia)	3
CIS Airplay (TopHit)	7
Greece (IFPI Greece)	32
Hungary (Dance Top 40)	25
Netherlands (Single Top 100)	83
Romania (Romanian Top 100)	34
Russia Airplay (TopHit)	7
Switzerland (Schweizer Hitparade)	46

=== Year-end charts ===
Year-end chart performance for "In Love with Myself"
Chart (2006)	Position
CIS (TopHit)	38
Russia Airplay (TopHit)	56
