= Cathy Guetta =

French nightclub manager and socialite

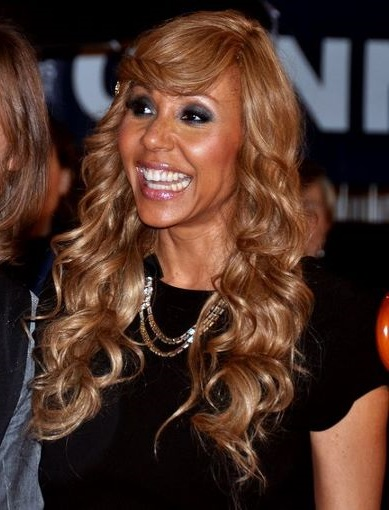
- Cathy at the NRJ Music Awards, 2012
- Born: Catherine Lobé; 27 March 1963 (age 63); Dakar, Senegal
- Occupations: Nightclub manager; events organizer; socialite; actress
- Years active: 2003–present
- Spouse: David Guetta (m. 1992; div. 2014)
- Children: 2

Catherine Lobé (French: [katʁin lɔbe]; previously Guetta; born 27 March 1963) is a French former nightclub manager, events organizer and socialite. She is the ex-wife of DJ and music producer David Guetta.

== Early life and career ==
Cathy Lobé was born in Dakar, Senegal, on 27 March 1963. Her father was in the army and originally from Cameroon, and her mother was French. She spent her childhood in Toulon, as well as in Senegal. Shortly after moving from Senegal to France, she became the manager of a nightclub and organized Parisian parties.

In 1992, she met and married David Guetta. They have two children: son Tim Elvis Eric (born 9 February 2004) and daughter Angie Guetta (born 23 September 2007). After twenty-two years of marriage, the Guettas were granted a divorce by a Paris court in March 2014.

In 2003, she and her then-husband opened a night venue called Le Sweet Bar. She also ran a Moroccan restaurant in Paris, Le Tanjia, and was artistic director for the disco, Les Bains Douches. She is also a business partner of Muratt Atik at Pink Paradise, a strip nightclub, and the restaurant, La Poope. She also organizes events in many locations, notably in Cannes and Marrakesh. Since 1996, she has been organizing special nights with David Guetta in Ibiza, the Spanish island renowned for its nightlife. The results of her collaboration are joint albums called the "Fuck Me I'm Famous" series, released as Cathy and David Guetta. She also organizes annual events called Unighted by Cathy Guetta, inviting well-known international DJs. She hosted and conducted the event at the national stadium in Saint-Denis near Paris, the Stade de France in 2008 and 2009, then moved the event to Nice in 2010 at the Stade Charles-Ehrmann.

She has also taken on acting roles. In 1999 she debuted in Quasimodo d'El Paris, a film directed by Patrick Timsit. She also appeared alongside Romain Duris and Jean-Paul Belmondo in Peut-être and in 2002, as Fred in 3 zéros, a film by Fabien Onteniente. She has appeared in a number of music videos, notably in "Sexy Chick" by David Guetta and Akon in 2009 and in "The Alphabeat" with David Guetta in 2012.

In 2008 Cathy Guetta published her autobiography, Bains de Nuit.

== Discography ==
=== Albums ===
Fuck Me I'm Famous series

List of compilation albums, with selected chart positions
| Title | Album details | Peak chart positions | | | | | | |
| Title | Album details | FRA | AUT | BEL (Wa) | SPN | SWI | UK Comp. | US Dance |
|---|---|---|---|---|---|---|---|---|
| Fuck Me I'm Famous (Cathy & David Guetta) | Released: 1 July 2003 (FRA); Label: Virgin; Formats: CD, digital download | — | — | 39 | — | 82 | — | — |
| Fuck Me I'm Famous Vol. 2 (Cathy & David Guetta) | Released: 18 July 2005 (FRA); Label: Virgin; Formats: CD, digital download | — | — | — | — | 6 | — | — |
| Fuck Me I'm Famous – Ibiza Mix 06 (Cathy & David Guetta) | Released: 26 June 2006 (FRA); Label: Virgin; Formats: CD, digital download | — | — | 62 | — | — | — | — |
| Fuck Me I'm Famous – Ibiza Mix 08 (Cathy & David Guetta) | Released: 9 June 2008 (FRA); Label: Virgin; Formats: CD, digital download | 8 | — | — | — | — | — | — |
| Fuck Me I'm Famous – Ibiza Mix 2009 (Cathy & David Guetta) | Released: 12 June 2009 (FRA); Label: Virgin; Formats: CD, digital download | — | — | — | — | 9 | — | — |
| Fuck Me I'm Famous – Ibiza Mix 2010 (Cathy & David Guetta) | Released: 26 July 2010 (FRA); Label: Virgin; Formats: CD, digital download | — | 19 | — | 45 | 6 | — | — |
| Fuck Me I'm Famous – Ibiza Mix 2011 (Cathy & David Guetta) | Released: 10 June 2011 (FRA); Label: Virgin; Formats: CD, digital download | 3 | 17 | — | 39 | 2 | — | — |
| Fuck Me I'm Famous – Ibiza Mix 2012 (Cathy & David Guetta) | Released: 29 June 2012 (DEN); Label: Virgin; Formats: CD, digital download | 5 | 13 | — | 30 | 2 | 20 | 24 |
| Fuck Me I'm Famous – Ibiza Mix 2013 (Cathy & David Guetta) | Released: 24 June 2013 (DEN); Label: Virgin; Formats: CD, digital download | 11 | — | — | — | — | — | — |
"—" denotes a recording that did not chart or was not released in that territory.

Unighted by Cathy Guetta series

List of compilation albums, with selected chart positions
| Title | Album details | Peak chart positions | |
| Title | Album details | FRA | BEL (Wa) |
|---|---|---|---|
| Unighted | Released: 2008; Label: Formats: CD, digital download | — | 40 |
| Cathy Guetta Presents Unighted 2009 | Released: 2009; Label: Formats: CD, digital download | — | — |
| Unighted 3 | Released: 2010; Label: Formats: CD, digital download | — | — |

== Filmography ==
- 1999: Quasimodo d'El Paris as a prostitute
- 1999: Peut-être as a DJ
- 2000: Jet Set as Mercedes
- 2001: Would I Lie to You 2 (original French title La vérité si je mens! 2) as Isabelle
- 2001: Sa mère, la pute as Ebène (TV series)
- 2002: Shooting Stars as Fred
- 2012: Nothing But The Beat as herself
- 2019: Ibiza as Cathy

== Bibliography ==
- 2008: Bains de nuit by Cathy Guetta, Clara Dupont-Monod, publisher: Fayard (in French), ISBN 9782213631172
