= The Egg (band) =

British EDM band

- Origin: Oxford, England
- Genres: Electronic, trip hop, neo-psychedelia
- Years active: 1994–present
- Members: Ned Scott; Matt White; Paul Marshall; Maff Scott

The Egg are a British electronic dance music band, consisting of Ned Scott (keyboards), Maff Scott (drums), Paul Marshall (bass) and Matt White (lead guitar).

== History ==
Founded in the early 1990s in Oxford, England, the Egg released its first EP Shopping (1995) on the independent record label, Cup of Tea Records. Having been signed by China Records, in 1996 the band released the album Albumen in the United States on Discovery Records in 1997. In 1998, the follow-up album, Travelator, was released, produced by Tim Holmes of Death in Vegas. In 2000, the group recorded the theme tune to the ITV series, At Home with the Braithwaites.

Following Travelator, the Egg began exploring the new directions. Following their Mellowmania EP in 2002, they were signed by Bar de Lune Records, a subsidiary of Beechwood Music. Beechwood folded the following year just before a return with their new album, Forwards, (produced by Benji Vaughan) and subsequently released on Squarepeg Records in 2004.

The single "Walking Away" (featuring Sophie Barker of Zero 7 fame) was released in 2005, and further remixes commissioned by licensees. This became a crossover hit, and spawned the bootleg by David Guetta, "Love Don't Let Me Go (Walking Away)", to reach No. 3 in the UK Singles Chart in August 2006.

In 2006, the Egg played at The Big Chill, Bestival, Glastonbury, and other venues across Europe. The following year saw more UK music festivals appearances.

In 2007 the band toured Australia and Brazil for the first time playing most major cities in each.

In 2008 the Egg contributed the song "Trails and Tribulations" to the Songs for Survival Survival International charity album, and later in the year they played at Camp Bisco 7 in Mariaville, NY. They also toured the U.S. extensively in 2008, 2009, and 2010.

Continued live performances have seen the Egg play at venues and festivals across the UK and the globe and as Glastonbury stalwarts, 2023 saw the Egg headline the Glade stage on the Saturday night of the festival.

== Members ==
=== Current members ===
- Ned Scott (keyboards, vocals)
- Maff Scott (drums)
- Paul Marshall (bass)
- Matt White (guitars)

=== Former members ===
- Dave Gaydon (bass)
- Graham Barton (bass)
- Mark Revell (guitar)

=== Touring members ===
- Todd Graft / Max Hattler (visuals)
- Shaun Hunter (sound engineer) (Programmer/co-writer)

=== Former touring members ===
- Drew Thane (2009, US tour only)
- Chris Mitchell (guitar 2017 - 2025)

== Discography ==
=== Studio albums ===
- 1996 Albumen
- 1998 Travelator – UK No. 126
- 1999 Get Some Mixes Together
- 2004 Forwards
- 2006 Forwards Special Edition
- 2012 Something to Do
- 2018 Galactic Love Machine

=== Live albums ===
- 2008 Live at Cargo
- 2009 Live at Camp Bisco
- 2009 Live in Saint Louis (video)

=== EPs ===
- 1995 Get Some Money Together featuring remix by Fila Brazillia, Heights of Abraham, Statik Sound System
- 1995 Shopping EP
- 2003 Mellowmania

=== Singles ===
- 1997 "Bend" – Fila Brazillia mixes etc.
- 1997 "Get Some Money to Get Her" (Discovery USA)
- 1999 "Getting Away with It" – mixes by Rollo Armstrong, streetlife originals – No. 58 UK
- 1999 "Hey Charlie" – mixes by Next men
- 2006 "Walking Away" – mixes by Grand National, Dusty Kid Pop and Tocadisco – UK No. 56
- 2006 "Love Don't Let Me Go (Walking Away)" vs. David Guetta – No. 3 UK
- 2007 "Nothing" – mixes by Cicada, Dusty Kid Pop and Plimsol
- 2012 "Catch" – mixes by Psychemagik, The C90s, Hurukan and Tom Laroye
