= David Guetta =

French DJ (born 1967)

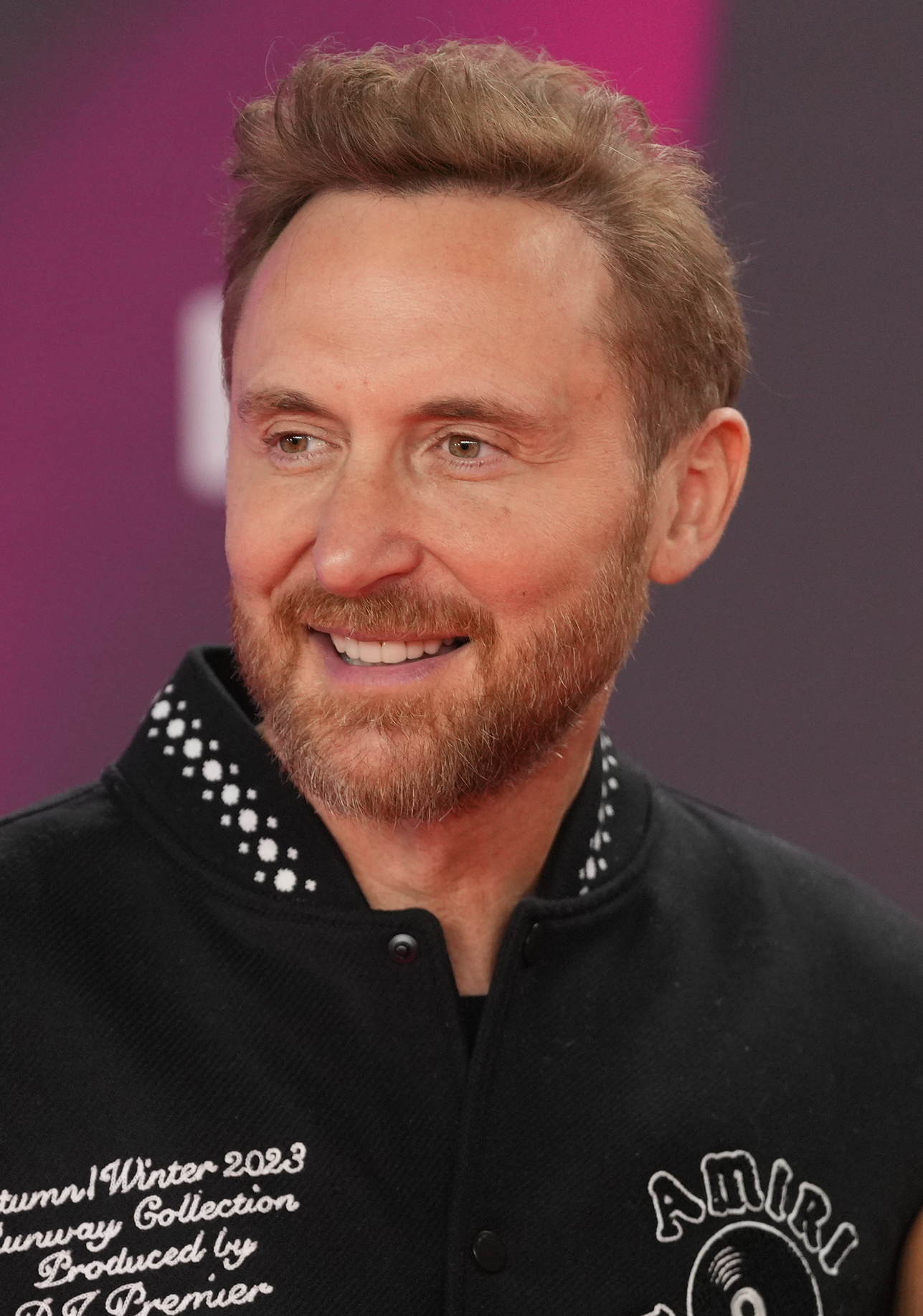
- Guetta at the 24th Annual Latin Grammy Awards in 2023
- Born: Pierre David Guetta; 7 November 1967 (age 59); Paris, France
- Other names: Jack Back; Jack Hisbach
- Occupations: Disc jockey; record producer; songwriter; music programmer
- Years active: 1984–present
- Works: Discography; production
- Spouse: Cathy Lobé (m. 1992; div. 2014)
- Partner: Jessica Ledon
- Children: 4
- Relatives: Bernard Guetta (half-brother); Nathalie Guetta (half-sister)
- Musical career
- Genres: EDM; house; progressive house; dance-pop; future rave; euro hop
- Instruments: Piano; digital audio workstation
- Labels: What A Music; Big Beat; Atlantic; Parlophone; Virgin; EMI; Capitol; Astralwerks; Ultra; Gum; Fuck Me I'm Famous; Jack Back; GUT; What A DJ; Elektra
- Website: davidguetta.com

Logo
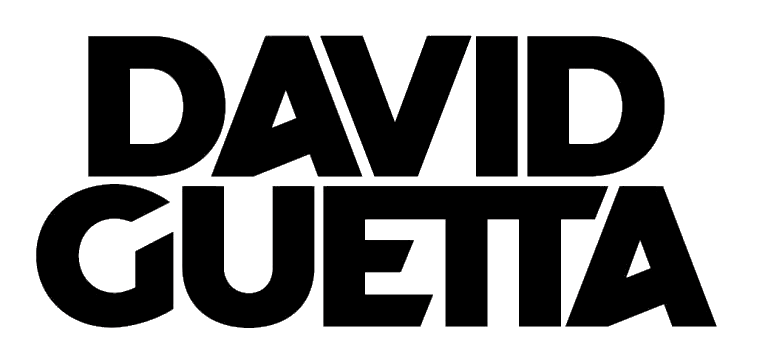

Pierre David Guetta (French: [pjɛʁ david ɡeta]; born 7 November 1967) is a French DJ and record producer. He has sold over 10 million albums and 65 million singles globally, with more than 40 billion streams on Spotify. Guetta was voted the number one DJ in the DJ Mag Top 100 DJs polls in 2011, 2020, 2021, 2023, 2025, and 2026. In 2013, Billboard ranked his song "When Love Takes Over" (featuring Kelly Rowland) as the number one dance-pop collaboration of all time.

He released his debut album, Just a Little More Love, in 2002. Later, he released Guetta Blaster (2004) and Pop Life (2007). Guetta achieved mainstream success with his fourth album One Love (2009), which included his breakthrough singles "When Love Takes Over" (featuring Kelly Rowland), "Gettin' Over You" (with Chris Willis featuring Fergie and LMFAO), "Sexy Bitch" (featuring Akon) and "Memories" (featuring Kid Cudi); the former three reached number one in the United Kingdom. His fifth album, Nothing but the Beat (2011), was met with continued success, containing the hit singles "Where Them Girls At" (featuring Flo Rida and Nicki Minaj), "Little Bad Girl" (featuring Taio Cruz and Ludacris), "Without You" (featuring Usher), "Titanium" (featuring Sia) and "Turn Me On" (featuring Nicki Minaj). In 2018, he released his seventh album 7, which included twelve tracks under his alias Jack Back. In 2019, he announced his creation of the EDM subgenre "future rave" along with fellow producer Morten Breum; they released a collaborative extended play, New Rave in July 2020. In 2022, he released the single "I'm Good (Blue)" (with Bebe Rexha), which remains the third longest-running chart-topping song on the US Dance/Electronic chart.

Guetta's accolades include two Grammy Awards, an American Music Award, six Electronic Dance Music Awards and a Billboard Music Award. In June 2021, he sold his recorded music catalogue for US$100 to US$150 million.

== Early life ==
Guetta was born and was raised in Paris. His father, Pierre, was a sociologist who was born in a Moroccan Jewish family from Tétouan. His mother, Monique, was of Belgian descent. Through his father, Guetta is the younger half-brother of the prominent French politician and journalist Bernard Guetta and French-Italian actress Nathalie Guetta. He also has a half-brother, Dominique Vidal and a half-sister, Joëlle Vidal from his mother's first marriage to French cybernetician Jacques Vidal. David Guetta began his music career as a disc jockey in Parisian nightclubs. At the same time, he read economics and social policy at the Paris Nanterre University.

== Career ==
=== 1984–2000: Early work ===
Guetta began to DJ at the Broad Club in Paris. He first played popular songs, and he discovered house music when he heard a Farley "Jackmaster" Funk track on French radio in 1987. The next year, he began hosting his own club nights. In 1990, he released "Nation Rap", a hip-hop collaboration with the French rapper Sidney Duteil.

In the mid-1990s, Guetta played in clubs including Le Centrale, the Rex, Le Boy, and Folies Pigalle. Released in 1994 Guetta's second single, a collaboration with American house vocalist Robert Owens titled "Up & Away", was a minor club hit. In 1994, Guetta became the manager of Le Palace nightclub and he continued to organise parties there and in other clubs, such as the "Scream" parties in Les Bains-Douches.

=== 2001–2003: Just a Little More Love ===
In 2001, Guetta and Joachim Garraud founded Gum Productions, and in the same year Guetta's first hit single, "Just a Little More Love", featuring American singer Chris Willis was released. Willis was vacationing in France when he met Guetta. Guetta's debut album Just a Little More Love was released in 2002 on Virgin Records and sold over 300,000 copies. The follow-up singles, ("Love Don't Let Me Go", "People Come People Go" and "Give Me Something"), were released in 2002. Guetta released a compilation, F*ck Me I'm Famous, in 2003, named after his party in Ibiza. It included "Just for One Day (Heroes)", a remix of David Bowie's song "Heroes". Later in his career, Guetta continued recording compilations under that title. Along with Garraud, Guetta remixed Orchestral Manoeuvres in the Dark's 1980 hit "Enola Gay" for The OMD Singles (2003).

=== 2004–2006: Guetta Blaster ===
Guetta's second album, Guetta Blaster, was released in 2004. It was supported with the release of four singles: "Money" and "Stay" featuring Chris Willis and "The World Is Mine" and "In Love With Myself" featuring JD Davis. In 2006 the Just a Little More Love single "Love Don't Let Me Go" was re-released as a mash-up with the Tocadisco remix of "Walking Away" by The Egg. The mash-up single entitled "Love Don't Let Me Go (Walking Away)" was charted higher than the original release of the song.

=== 2007–2009: Pop Life ===
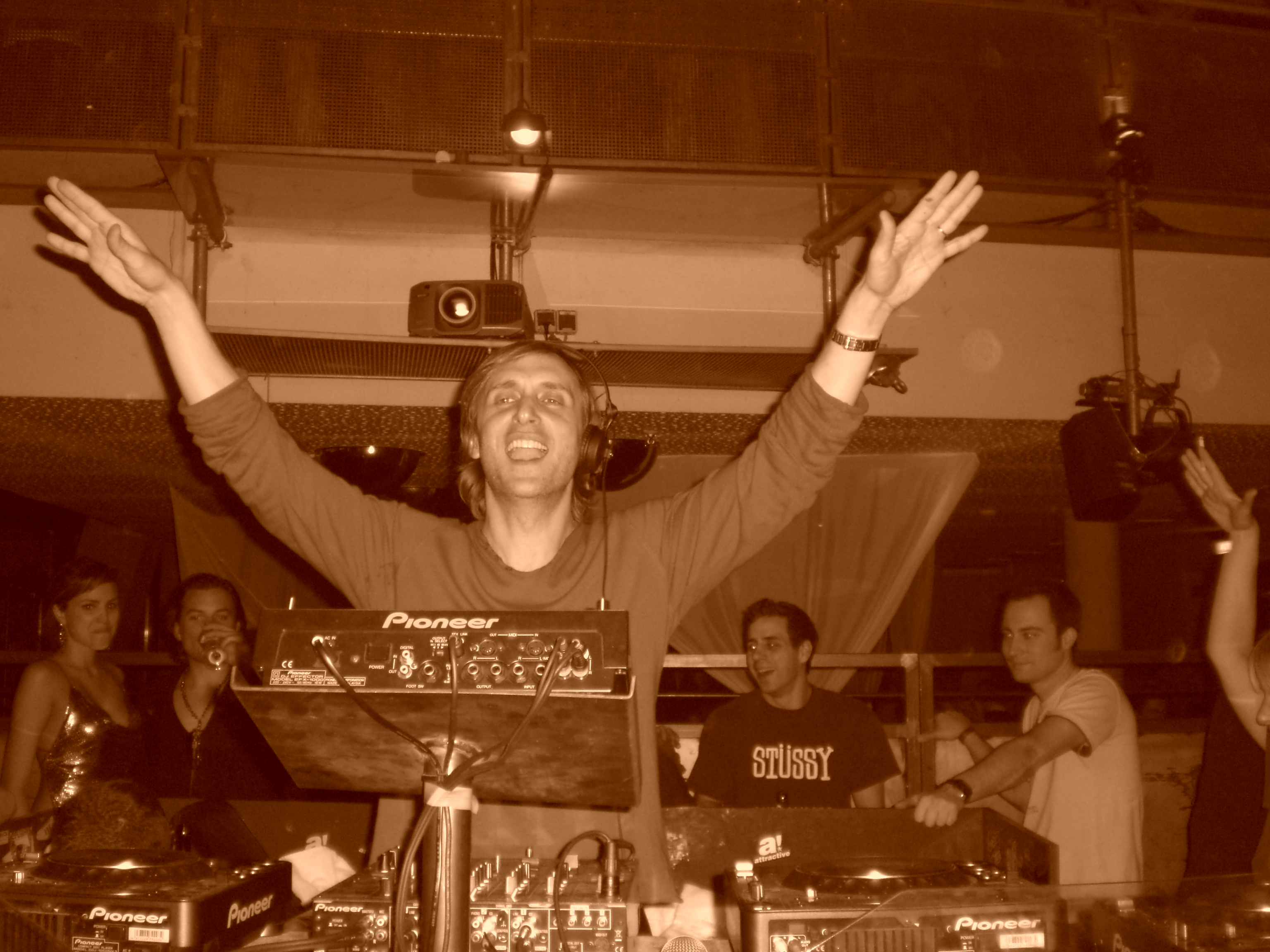
Guetta performing in 2007

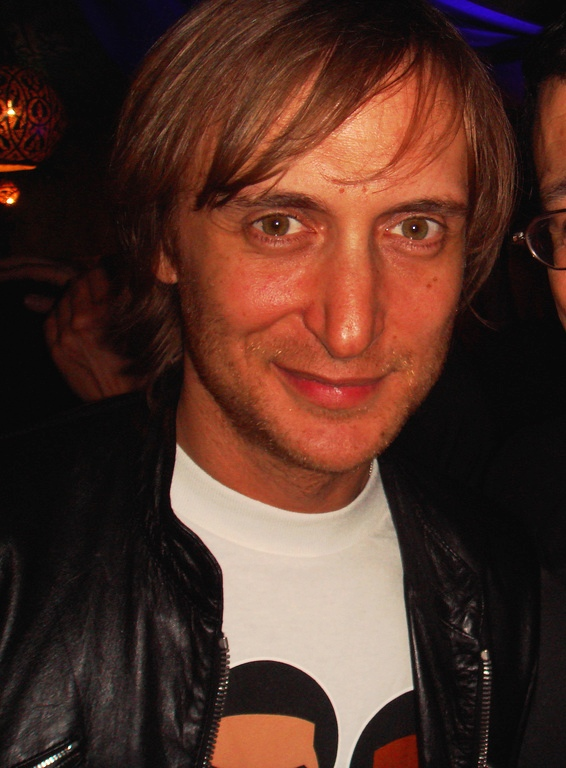
Guetta in 2008

In 2007, Guetta's third album Pop Life was released. The album was successful in the UK and Ireland as well as in mainland Europe. According to EMI in 2010, the album has sold a total of 530,000 copies worldwide. The lead single "Love Is Gone" reached Number 1 on the American Dance Chart and charted on the Billboard Hot 100.

"Delirious" featured the vocals of Tara McDonald who also co wrote the record. The song was released as the album's fourth single on 31 January 2008. The song charted No. 27 Austrian singles chart, No. 17 Belgian (Flanders) chart, No. 2 Belgian (Wallonia) singles chart. No. 12 Dutch singles chart, No. 16 French singles chart, No. 16 Swiss singles chart, No. 36 Hungary singles chart, No. 29 Romanian singles chart, No. 51 Swedish singles chart. The remixes of the song, including mixes by Fred Rister, Marc Mysterio, Laidback Luke, and Arno Cost and Norman Doray were released. A video clip for the song was filmed by Denys Thibaut in Montreal, featuring Guetta and Tara McDonald, picturing an executive assistant throwing paint all over her boss's office. McDonald also sang and co wrote "You're Not Alone" from this album.

He has played in many countries around the world to promote the album. He played in Mauritius in January 2008, accompanied by French rapper JoeyStarr. In the same year, he and his wife Cathy also planned a new event which took place in the Stade de France on 5 July 2008. The event was called "UNIGHTED", he performed with Tiësto, Carl Cox, Joachim Garraud and Martin Solveig in front of a crowd of 40,000.

In 2009, he was placed third in the "Top 100 DJs" poll by DJ Magazine, and was elected "Best House DJ" by DJ Awards in 2008. Since April 2009, Guetta had his own radio show on the internet radio station RauteMusik on Saturday evening. The show was afterwards moved into Radio 538, being aired every Friday evening after Tiësto's Club Life.

=== 2009–2010: One Love and international breakthrough ===
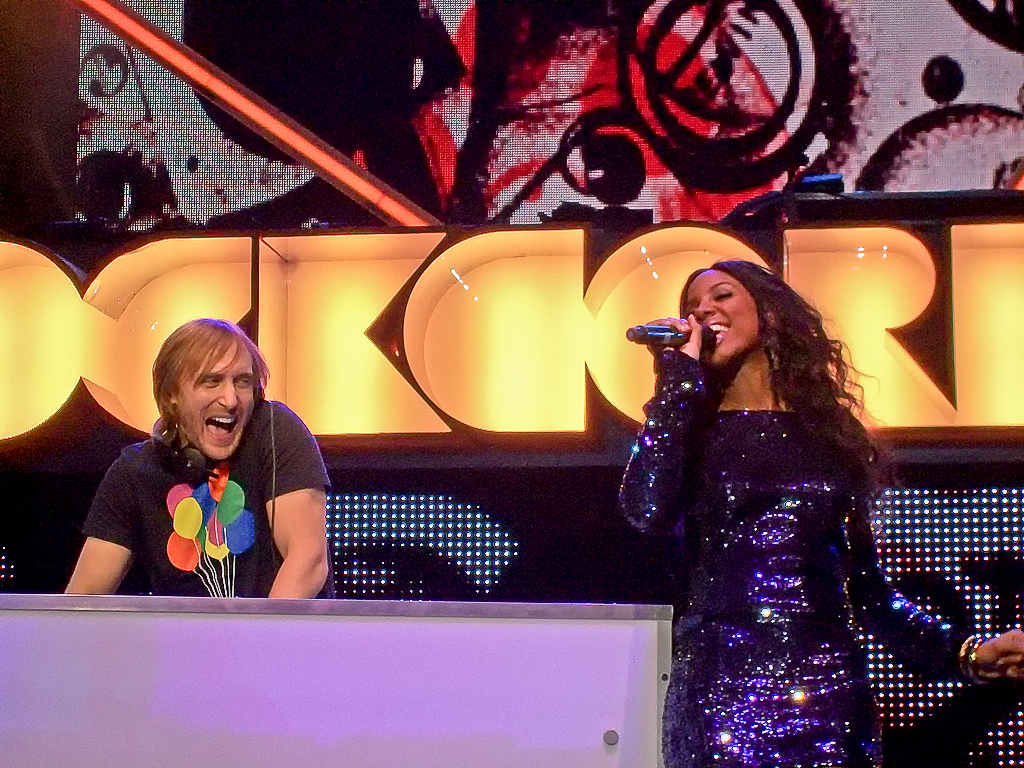
Guetta and Kelly Rowland in concert at the Orange Rockcorps festival in London, 2009

Guetta's fourth studio album, One Love, was released in August 2009. Its first single "When Love Takes Over", which featured Kelly Rowland, peaked at No. 1 on the UK Singles Chart and topped many other countries worldwide, selling over 5,5 million copies worldwide. His second single from the album, "Sexy Bitch" featuring Akon, became his second No. 1 in the UK. "One Love" featuring Estelle, "Memories" featuring Kid Cudi and "Gettin' Over You" featuring Chris Willis, Fergie and LMFAO followed. As of May 2011 the album had sold three million copies worldwide. Guetta's fourth studio album One Love was nominated as "Best Electronic/Dance Album" at the 52nd Annual Grammy Awards. His song "When Love Takes Over" featuring American R&B singer Kelly Rowland received two nominations; Best Dance Recording and Best Remixed Recording, Non-Classical, and won the latter. After conflicts over whether or not an album re-issue should go ahead, One More Love was released on 29 November 2010. The first single, titled "Who's That Chick?" featuring Rihanna was released a few weeks prior.

On 16 June 2009, The Black Eyed Peas released the Guetta-produced "I Gotta Feeling" as their second single from their fifth studio album, The E.N.D.. It became a worldwide hit topping the charts in seventeen countries. It became the most downloaded song of all-time in the United States with almost 7.5 million downloads and in the United Kingdom selling more than 1 million copies. He was nominated twice for his work with The Black Eyed Peas at the 52nd Grammy Awards; in the category Record of the Year for "I Gotta Feeling" and Album of the Year for their album The E.N.D.. In 2010, Guetta co-wrote and produced Kelly Rowland's "Commander" from her third album Here I Am. It peaked at number one on Billboard's Hot Dance Club Songs chart in the United States, and reached top ten positions in Belgium and the United Kingdom. Guetta has also co-produced "Forever and a Day", which was Kelly's next UK single from that album. Guetta also produced the singles "Acapella" and "Scream" for American singer-songwriter Kelis's fifth studio album, Flesh Tone, released on 14 May 2010. "Acapella" was released as the lead single on 23 February 2010 and topped the dance charts in the United Kingdom and United States. On 28 June 2010 American rapper Flo Rida released the single "Club Can't Handle Me" featuring Guetta. The song is included on the soundtrack album to the American 3D dance film Step Up 3D and Flo Rida's third studio album, Only One Flo (Part 1).

=== 2011–2012: Nothing but the Beat and Jack Back Records ===
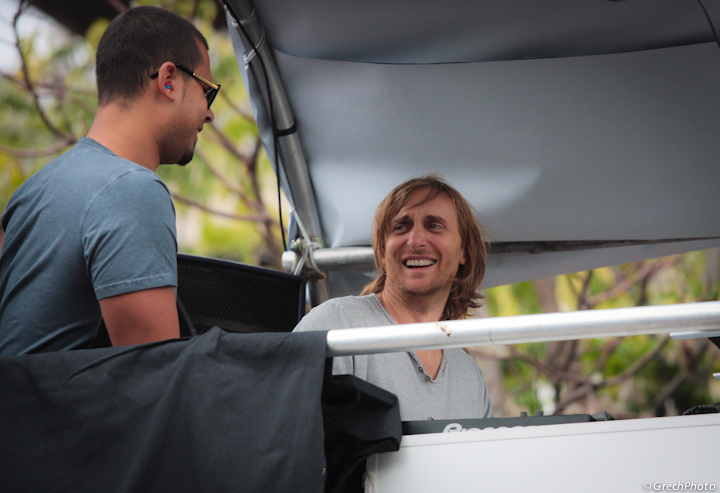
Guetta on stage with Afrojack, 2011

Guetta's fifth studio album, Nothing but the Beat was released on 26 August 2011. It was released as a double-disc album; one disc being vocal and the other being electronic. Guetta was inspired by rock bands such as Kings of Leon and Coldplay to add rock influences to his dance productions. "Where Them Girls At" featuring Flo Rida and Nicki Minaj, the first single off the album, was released worldwide on 2 May 2011. "Little Bad Girl", with Taio Cruz and Ludacris, was released as the second single on 28 June 2011. The third single, "Without You" with Usher, was released on 27 September 2011. Guetta has also released four promotional singles for Nothing But the Beat which were "Titanium" with Sia, "Lunar" with Afrojack, "Night of Your Life" with Jennifer Hudson, and "The Alphabeat". The album also features the hit singles "Sweat" with Snoop Dogg and "Turn Me On" with Nicki Minaj.

Guetta teamed up with Afrojack and Tara McDonald again to release "Pandemonium" on his FMIF Ibiza Mix 2011 compilation through EMI records. Guetta also performed alongside Nicky Romero and Nervo at London's Alexandra Palace on 1 June 2012.

A re-release of Nothing but the Beat, titled Nothing but the Beat 2.0, was released on 7 September 2012. The first single from the album, "She Wolf (Falling to Pieces)", which saw Guetta collaborate with Sia yet again, was released in support of the album. The next single off Nothing But The Beat 2.0 was confirmed by Guetta as "Just One Last Time" which features vocals from Swedish duo Taped Rai. In 2012, Guetta also made an album named Nothing But The Beat: Ultimate, which combined the two albums Nothing But The Beat and Nothing But The Beat 2.0 together. Summer 2012 Guetta played in Finland in Weekend Festival and he was the festival's headliner also for year 2013. 15 March saw the third single release from Nothing but the Beat 2.0 entitled "Play Hard". The song features vocals from American singers Ne-Yo and Akon.

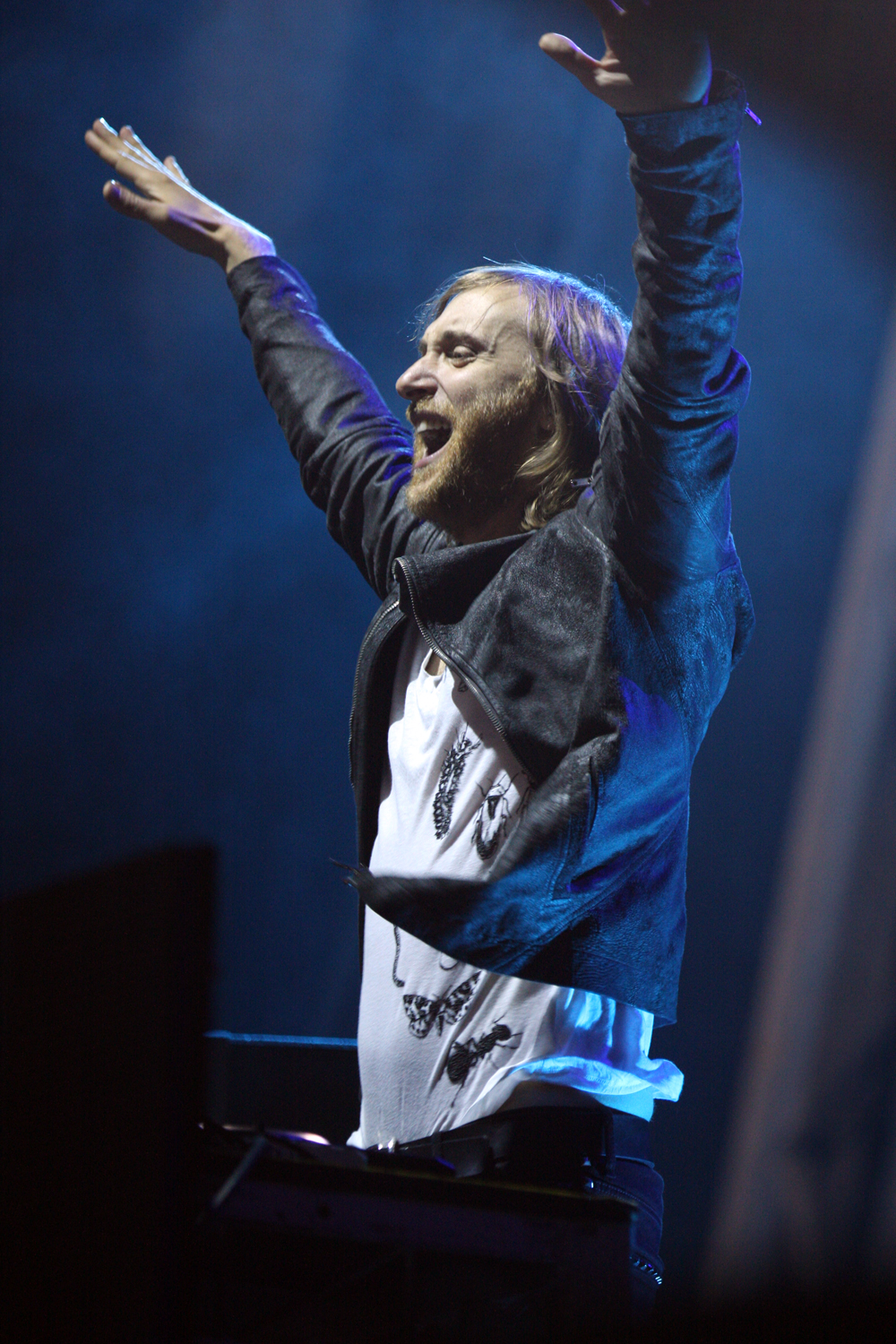
Guetta performing at Creamfields Australia, 2012

Nothing But the Beat is a feature-length biographical documentary about Guetta's rise to fame, featuring many of his collaborators, including Kelly Rowland, will.i.am and Snoop Dogg. It was financed by the energy drink, burn, with whom Guetta became a brand ambassador from 2011. Together with burn, Guetta also provided support and mentoring for the burn-sponsored "burn studios residency" program for up-and-coming DJs.

Guetta also wrote, produced, and featured on Rihanna's seventh studio album, Unapologetic, and acts as the support act for the European leg of her Diamonds World Tour.

In 2012, Guetta created a new record label known as Jack Back Records, where he intends to focus only on electronic music releases (compared to the dance pop productions he's most known for). The label is named after a project Guetta started alongside Nicky Romero when they remixed the song "Wild Ones". The premiere release of the new label was "Metropolis", another one of his collaboration with Romero, which also became a track from Nothing but the Beat 2.0. The label also included releases from the likes of Daddy's Groove and other collaborators, as well as a two-track EP from production duo Spencer & Hill. All of the label's releases can be found on Beatport.

=== 2013: Lovers on the Sun EP ===
While on tour with Rihanna, he debuted his new track at Twickenham Stadium on 15 June 2013. Guetta stated "Twickenham, I hope you like this new track, it's brand new and you're the first people in the world to hear it." The single, called "Ain't a Party", was released on 8 July 2013. It is a collaboration between GLOWINTHEDARK and Harrison. Guetta released the artwork for his new single on his Instagram profile on 19 June 2013.

In September, Guetta unveiled the music video for new track "One Voice" featuring indie singer Mikky Ekko. It was released on 4 November as part of the UN's humanitarian campaign called The World Needs More.

Guetta co-wrote and produced the song "Fashion!" on Lady Gaga's third studio album Artpop. He also had songwriting and production contributions to Britney Spears' eighth studio album Britney Jean, on multiple tracks and instrumentation imitations.

On 20 January 2014, Guetta released "Shot Me Down" featuring American singer Skylar Grey. It is an adaption of the Cher song "Bang Bang (My Baby Shot Me Down)". The song was co-produced by Giorgio Tuinfort.

In February, Guetta released a remix of Avicii's track "Addicted to You" on Beatport. Later that month, record label Cherrytree hinted through a message on Twitter that English singer-songwriter Natalia Kills was in a studio in Stockholm, Sweden, along with Guetta and Giorgio Tuinfort to record a new song. The trio was later joined by DJ Afrojack, and Avicii. On 17 March 2014, he released "Bad", a collaboration with Showtek and Vassy on Jack Back Records, and released his remix of Afrojack's single "Ten Feet Tall" on 15 April.

Guetta released "Blast Off", with Kaz James on 14 June. It appeared on the four-track EP titled Lovers on the Sun he released later that month. The EP contains "Blast Off", "Shot Me Down", "Bad", and "Lovers on the Sun" featuring vocals from American singer Sam Martin.

=== 2014–2016: Listen and UEFA Euro 2016 ===
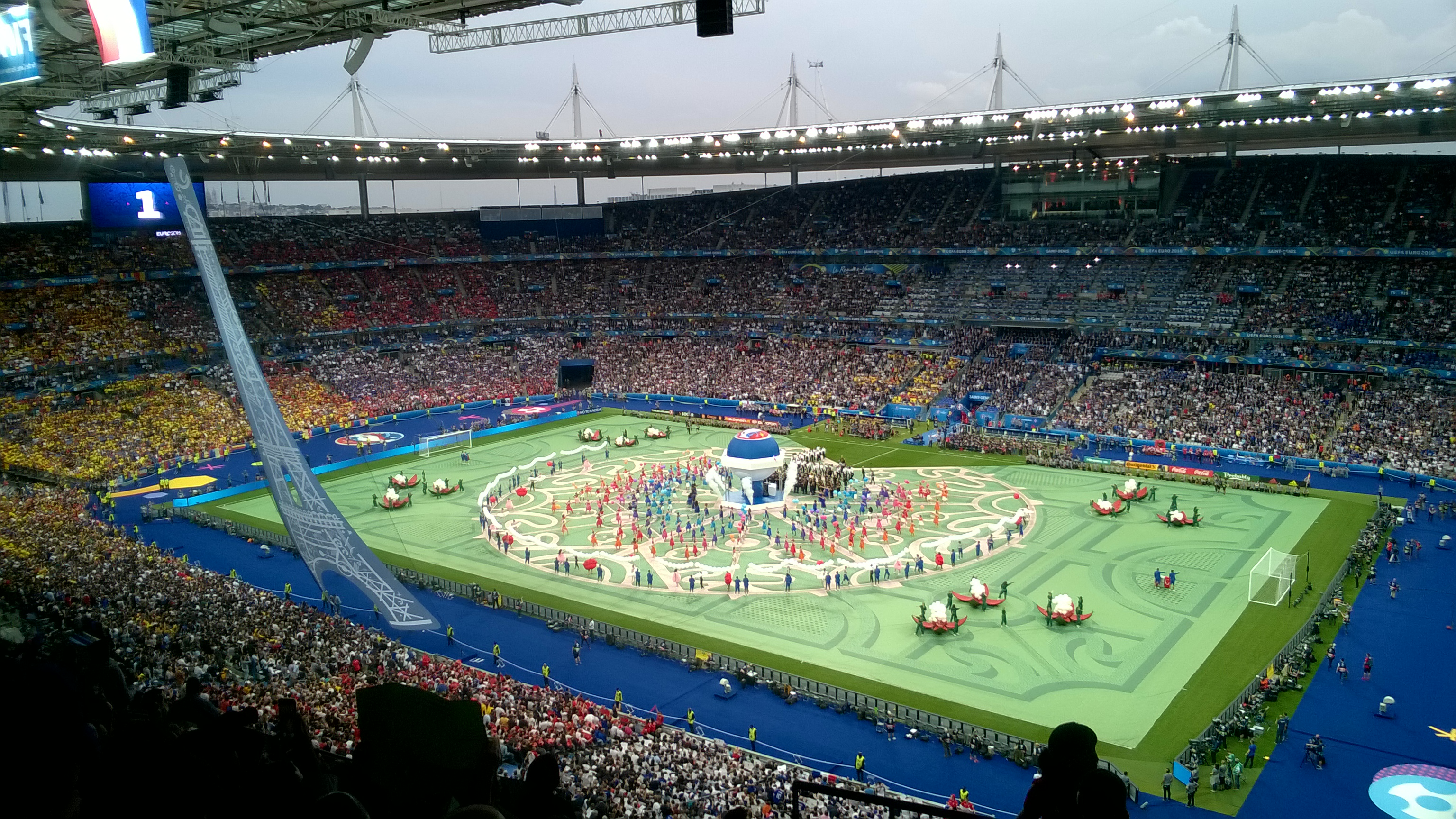
The UEFA Euro 2016 opening ceremony before Guetta's set

On 30 June 2014, "Lovers on the Sun" saw official single release as the first single from Guetta's sixth studio album, Listen. The second single from the album, "Dangerous", (also featuring Sam Martin), was released as the second single from the album on 5 October 2014. The album itself was released worldwide on 21 November 2014 through Big Beat Records and Atlantic Records with collaborations from prior favourites such as Sia, Afrojack, and Nicki Minaj as well as new collaborators like Ryan Tedder, Bebe Rexha, and The Script. The title track "Listen" (featuring John Legend) was co-written by Guetta and Austin Bis.

On 20 February 2015, the third single from the album "What I Did for Love" featuring Emeli Sandé was issued. On 30 April 2015, the song was released as a special version featuring vocals from Japanese singer Namie Amuro for her studio album Genic. In March 2015, Guetta released the fourth single from Listen, entitled "Hey Mama". It features the vocals of Nicki Minaj and Bebe Rexha, and also features Afrojack. The single proved successful, reaching the top ten in the UK and in the US. On 22 June 2015, Guetta became the third artist to reach 2 billion streams on Spotify and released a remix of "Hey Mama" by Boaz van de Beatz to celebrate the occasion.

On 27 November 2015, Guetta re-released Listen as Listen Again to promote the songs and then-recent singles "Sun Goes Down", "Pelican", "The Death of EDM", "Clap Your Hands" and a new version of "Bang My Head" featuring Fetty Wap alongside Sia.

In December 2015, UEFA announced that Guetta would be the music ambassador for UEFA Euro 2016, with the official song for the tournament being "This One's for You" featuring vocals from Swedish singer Zara Larsson. UEFA also announced that the song would be integrated throughout the tournament, including during the opening and closing sequences for every television match broadcast, and will also be performed by Guetta at the Opening ceremony and Closing ceremony, as well as during a free concert at the Champ de Mars under the Eiffel Tower on 9 June. "This One's for You" was released on 13 May 2016, followed by a remix pack on 8 July.

On 15 April 2016, Guetta released a single with Disciples, titled "No Worries". Later, on 16 May 2016, saw Guetta released an extended mix of his song "Pelican" on his label Jack Back Records.

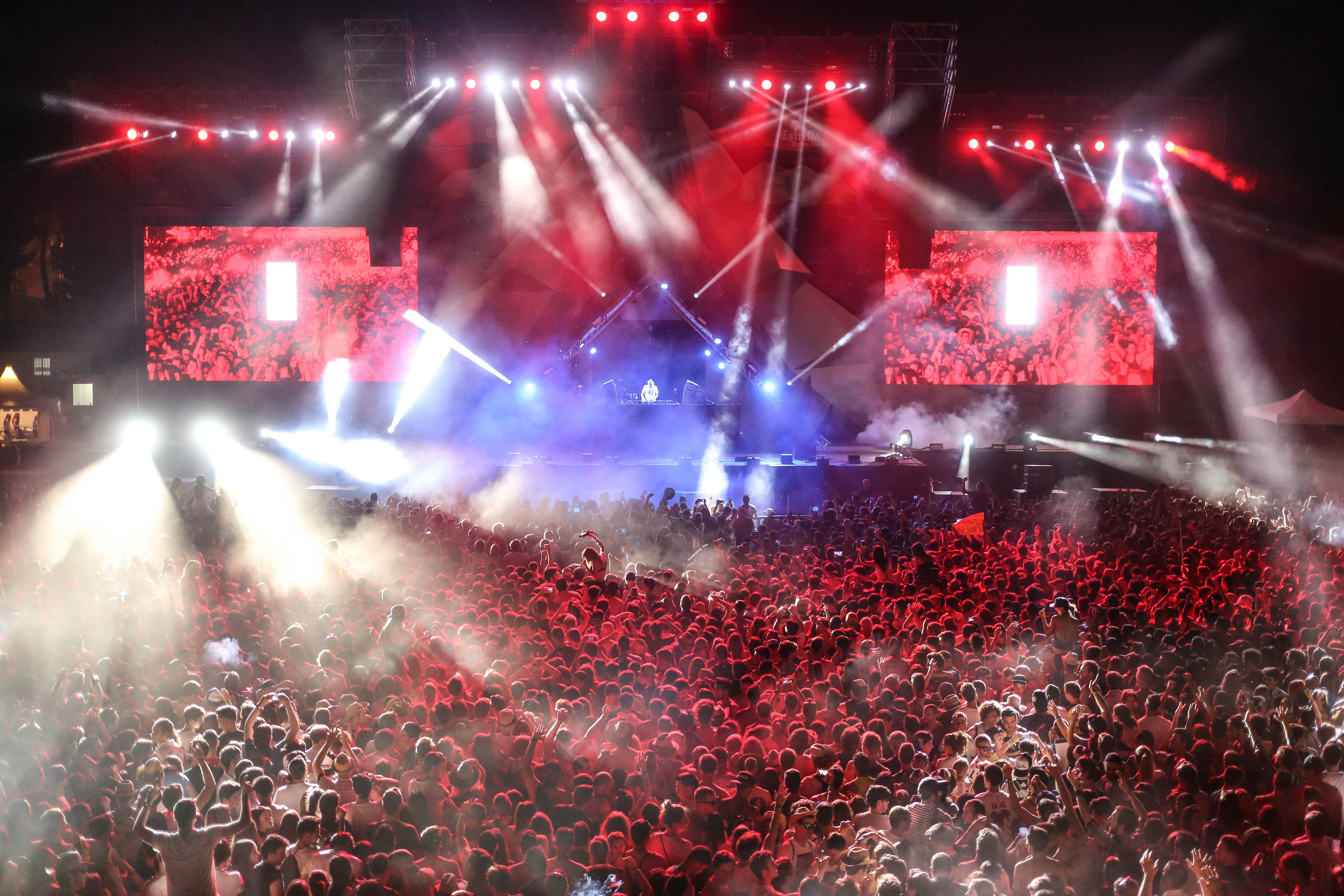
Guetta performing at the 2016 Utopía Festival in Madrid

On 30 September 2016, Guetta released a new single with Cedric Gervais and Chris Willis named "Would I Lie to You" on his label Jack Back Records. The song interpolates the vocals/lyrics of the 1992 Charles & Eddie hit "Would I Lie to You?". 2016 also saw Guetta collaborate with German DJ Robin Schulz on the third single from Schulz's third album, Uncovered, entitled "Shed a Light" which also featured American DJs Cheat Codes. The song was released on 25 November and certified Gold and Platinum in various European countries.

=== 2017–2019: 7 ===
On 24 March 2017, Guetta released "Light My Body Up". The single was his fourth collaboration with rapper Nicki Minaj and also featured Lil Wayne. The following month, on 28 April, Guetta released his collaboration with DJ Afrojack entitled "Another Life". The song featured singer Ester Dean. On 9 June 2017, Guetta's single "2U" featuring Justin Bieber was released, this song was featured on Worldhit and marked the Top 200 in over 40 countries as well as certifying Gold to Multi Platinum in many European and Oceanian countries. The end on the month saw Guetta release a remix version of "Versace on the Floor" by Bruno Mars and served as the third single from Mars's highly successful album 24K Magic.

During the summer, Guetta headlined Tomorrowland, providing a main stage performance for Night 3 on both weekends. In addition, he was a guest during Martin Garrix's closing set, during which they debuted their yet to be released single "So Far Away" which featured vocals from Jamie Scott and Ellie Goulding. Guetta also had Dimitri Vegas & Like Mike join him on stage to premier their new song "Complicated" which was released on the Friday of the festival's second weekend. During this time Guetta, Vegas, and Mike also performed the latter two's long-awaited single with W&W: "Crowd Control".

On 3 November 2017, Guetta and Afrojack released their single "Dirty Sexy Money" featuring Charli XCX and French Montana. This song is David Guetta's 3rd single from his upcoming 7th studio album, which was released in 2018. He performed a live-version of his new single at the NRJ Music Awards and the MTV Europe Music Awards.

On 1 December 2017, Guetta released the single "So Far Away" on Garrix's label Stmpd Rcrds. The single version contained vocals from Jamie Scott and Romy Dya. Ellie Goulding's vocals were cut from the song as her label was pushing back the release. That is the reason why the two DJs decided to replace her and use the vocals of Romy Dya. On 25 January 2018 Guetta released a remix version of Sia's Helium along with Dutch DJ Afrojack. This marks Guetta's and Sia's sixth collaboration.

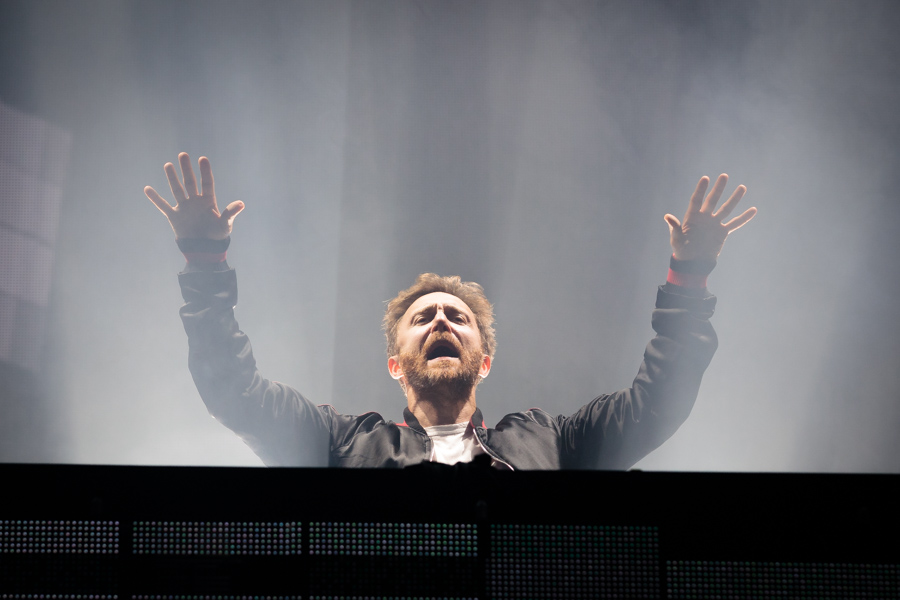
Guetta at Stavernfestivalen 2018

On 16 February 2018, David Guetta released his new song "Mad Love", together with Sean Paul and Becky G. A few months before the release Sean Paul reported that Shakira would be the singer of the song, but she has been replaced by Becky G. A week later, Guetta released his second collaboration with Martin Garrix and Dutch DJ Brooks entitled "Like I Do". Guetta's seventh collaboration with Sia, "Flames", was released on 22 March 2018.

On 29 June 2018, Guetta announced in an interview with Billboard China that he was almost finished working on his seventh studio album and that it would be released after the summer of 2018. During that summer when he played Tomorrowland, a video emerged of Guetta apparently playing a remixed version of the Spanish Falangist anthem Cara al Sol used during Francisco Franco's dictatorship. However, the video was confirmed to have been faked. On 23 August, Guetta confirmed the album's title as 7 and revealed its track list, including the singles "2U", "Like I Do", "Flames" and "Don't Leave Me Alone". The album also included the Bebe Rexha and J Balvin featured single, "Say My Name". In December 2019, Guetta led a DJ set at an Avicii tribute concert where he previewed a previously unheard collaboration with Avicii, Giorgio Tuinfort and Afrojack. In Guetta's own words, he played "Before I Say Goodbye" for the first and probably only time during the concert. It features British singer-songwriter Amanda Wilson.

=== 2020–present: New Rave EP, United at Home and Future Rave ===
On 11 September 2020, David Guetta and Sia reunited for new single "Let's Love". The single was produced and recorded during isolation.

On 17 July 2020, Guetta and Morten released their New Rave EP. Guetta and Morten started the new future rave sound movement in late 2019. Less than a year later, the duo amassed more than 110 million combined streams. It consists of four new tracks "Kill Me Slow", "Nothing", "Bombardment", and "Odyssey". Their record collection includes "Never Be Alone" feat Aloe Blacc, "Make It To Heaven" with Raye, the tribute remix of Avicii's "Heaven" and "Detroit 3 AM".

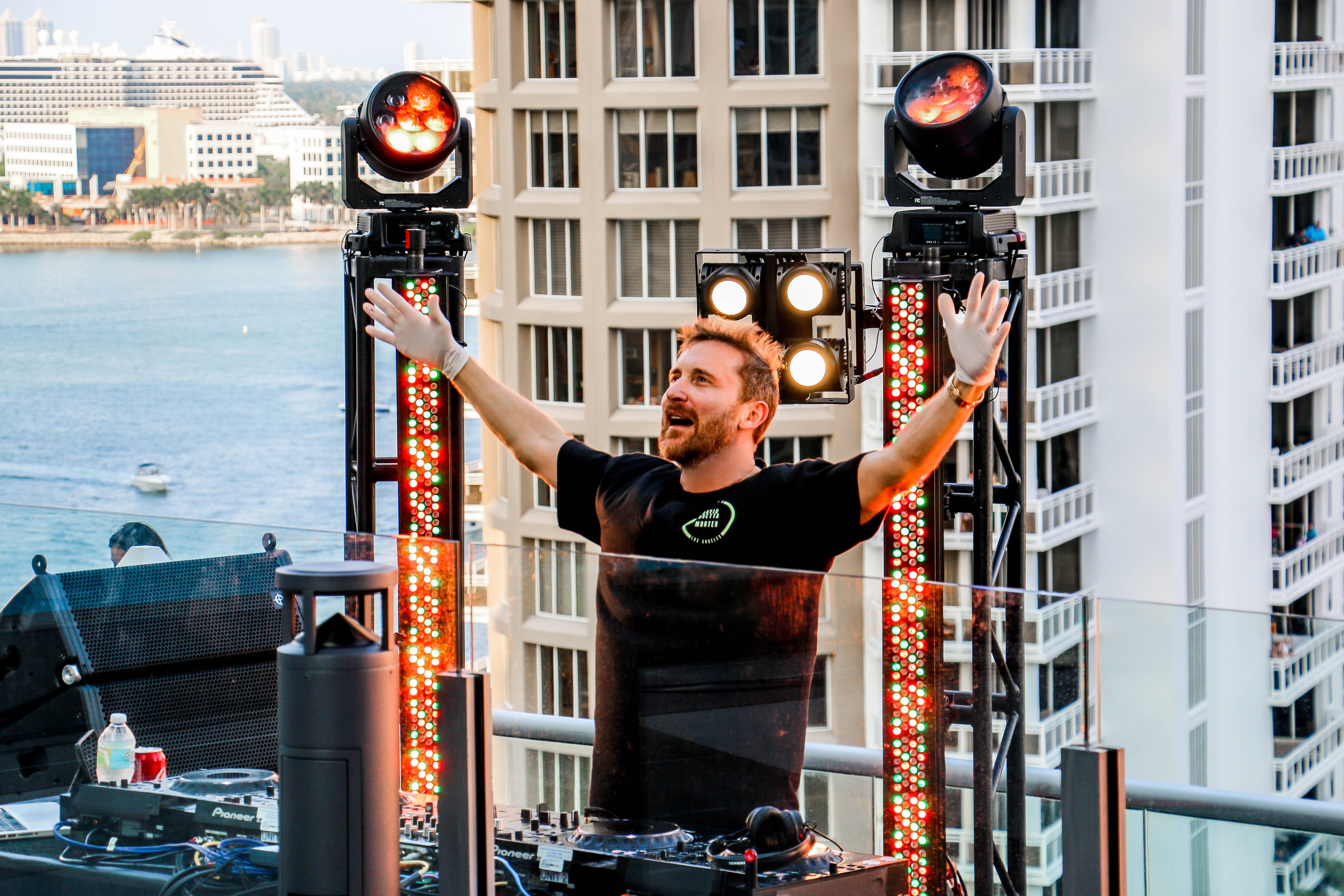
David Guetta at Icon Brickell 2018

On 18 April 2020, Guetta performed poolside, overlooking the Downtown Miami skyline and the waters of the Biscayne Bay from his location at the Icon Brickell. Funds were raised for the World Health Organisation, Feeding South Florida, Feeding America, and the Fondation Hôpitaux de Paris - Hôpitaux de France.

On 30 May 2020, Guetta performed at New York City's Top of the Rock Observation Deck at Rockefeller Center for the second edition of United At Home to a virtual crowd of over 24 million to benefit COVID-19 relief efforts. The event, titled "Major League Soccer and Heineken presents United at Home", raised half a million dollars for Mayor's Fund to Advance New York City, Feeding America, World Health Organization and Fondation Hôpitaux de Paris - Hôpitaux de France. The performance was the second edition of "United At Home," following Guetta's first fundraiser in Miami which raised more than US$750,000 for global charities and drew more than 25 million online views. Funds raised went directly to The Mayor's Fund to Advance New York City, chaired by First Lady Chirlane McCray, which is New York City's official fundraising arm for COVID-19 relief. However, Guetta was criticised for this performance, which included a shout-out to the family of George Floyd, followed by a fast-paced electronic dance tune which sampled a recording of Martin Luther King Jr.'s "I Have a Dream" speech. Critics found this decision to be "tone-deaf."

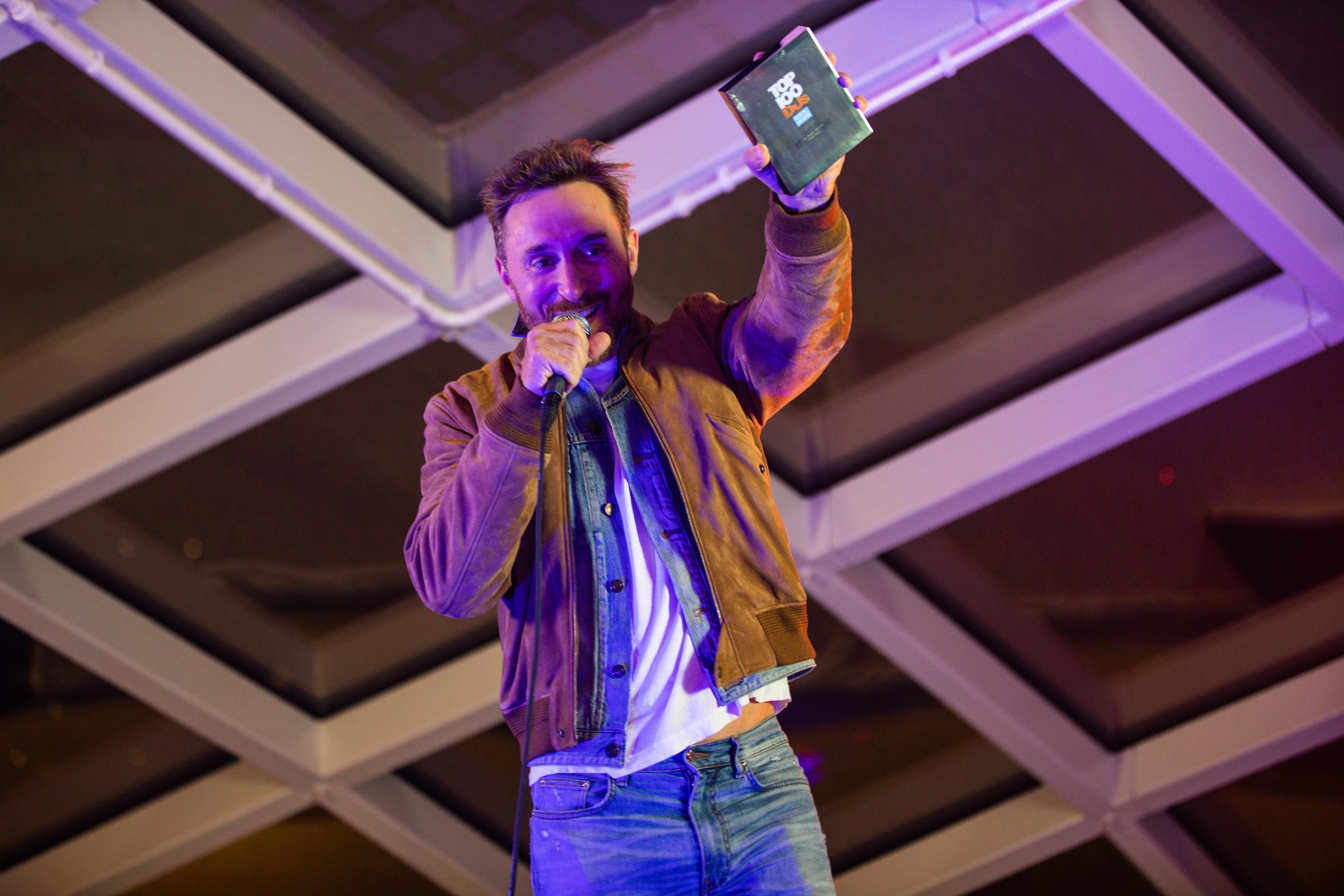
David Guetta receiving DJ Mag's World's No.1 DJ award

On 7 November 2020, Guetta won DJ Mag's annual Top 100 DJs poll for the second time, almost a decade after he first took the No.1 spot in 2011. Guetta was presented his award during AMF Presents Top 100 DJs, a virtual awards show in Amsterdam that was broadcast to the world. On 31 December 2020, Guetta presented a New Year's Eve virtual concert from Musée du Louvre, United at Home – Paris Edition, as a fundraiser for UNICEF and Restos du Cœur. On 20 May 2021, Guetta released his new single "Heartbreak Anthem" in collaboration with Little Mix and Galantis.

On 17 June 2021, Warner Music acquired rights to Guetta's recorded music catalogue from the last two decades.

In March 2022, Guetta and Morten announced a joint US tour, which concluded at EDC Las Vegas on 21 May 2022. They also announced a residency at Hï Ibiza to take place every Friday from 3 June to 30 September 2022.

On 8 April 2022, Guetta released the song "Crazy What Love Can Do" with British singer-songwriters Becky Hill and Ella Henderson. On 2 September 2022, Guetta teamed up with British DJ and producer Sigala alongside British singer-songwriter Sam Ryder on the song "Living Without You". On 27 October 2023, Guetta released a house-influenced afrobeat single "Big FU" featuring Nigerian singer Ayra Starr and American rapper Lil Durk.

On 7 November 2024, Guetta released the song "Supernova Love" with the South Korean girl group Ive.

On 6 March 2026, Guetta released the single "Save Me Tonight", in collaboration with American singer Jennifer Lopez.

On 11 June 2026, the song "DNA (More Than a Game)", the official anthem of the 2026 FIFA World Cup, was released, which included Andrea Bocelli, Megan Thee Stallion and Guetta alongside Ejae. Andea Bocelli and Ejae performed the song at the opening ceremony, with Guetta at the flag parade.

On 23 July 2026, it was announced that he would be one of the celebrities to receive a star on the Hollywood Walk of Fame in 2027.

== Discography ==
- Just a Little More Love (2002)
- Guetta Blaster (2004)
- Pop Life (2007)
- One Love (2009)
- Nothing but the Beat (2011)
- Listen (2014)
- 7 (2018)

== Tours ==
- Listen Tour (2014–15)

== Personal life ==
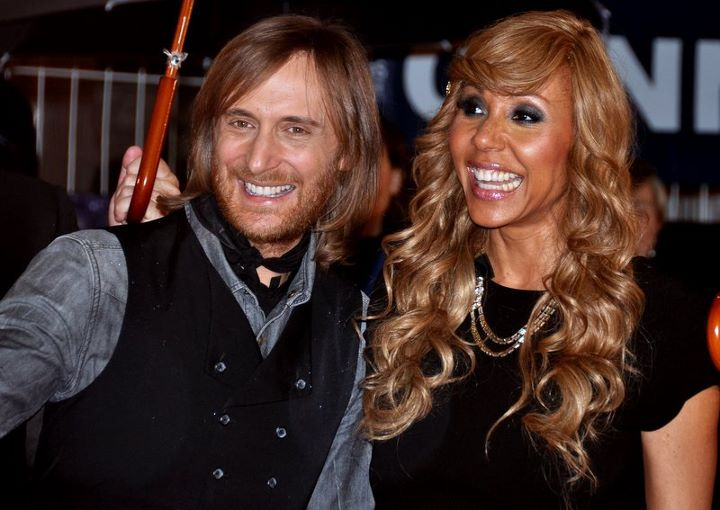
Guetta and his then-wife Cathy in January 2012 at the NRJ Music Awards

Guetta married French nightclub manager Cathy Lobé in 1992. They had two children: a son born in February 2004 and a daughter born in September 2007. After 22 years of marriage, the couple divorced in a Paris court in March 2014. Neither party was present at the hearing and the reason for their divorce is unknown.

In 2015, Forbes estimated that Guetta's annual income was $37 million. The same year, one of his companies was subject to a tax reassessment by the French Treasury.

On 17 March 2024, he announced the birth of their son, which Guetta previously announced at the Latin Grammys 2023 with his long-term partner Jessica Ledon. On 27 February 2026, he announced the birth of his fourth child.
