= Moné =

American singer

Ramona DeSouza, more popularly known as Moné, was an American music recording artist and songwriter. She scored three hits on the US Billboard Hot Dance Music/Club Play chart: "We Can Make It" (No. 1, 1995), "Movin'" (No. 2, 1996) and "Partay Feeling" (As B-Crew featuring Barbara Tucker, Dajae, Ultra Nate and Moné) (No. 22, 1997). In the UK Singles Chart, "We Can Make It" (No. 64, 1995) and "Movin'" (No. 48, 1996) each spent one week in that listing.

In 2010, she participated in an E!'s documentary series about eating disorders titled What's Eating You, in which Moné received therapy for her bulimia nervosa, which developed from adjustable gastric band surgery. During the course of the documentary, she recorded "A Brighter Day" on Techntoniks Recordings.

== See also ==
- List of number-one dance hits (United States)
- List of artists who reached number one on the U.S. dance chart
