= JD Davis =

Belgian musician (born 1973)

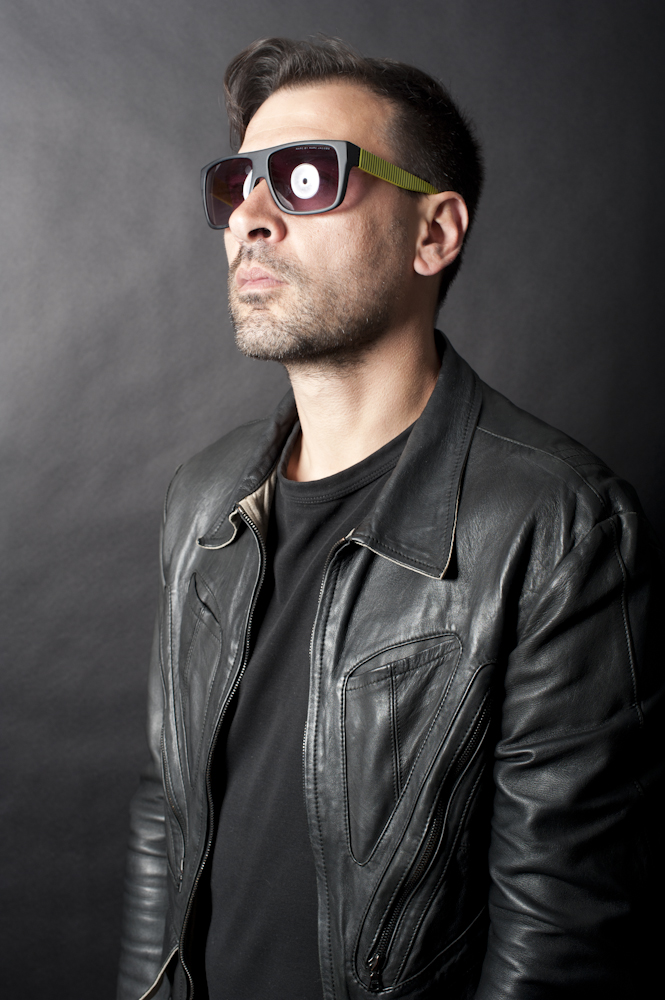

Background information
- Born: David Henrard; 13 April 1973 (age 53); Spa, Belgium
- Genres: House, EDM, Hard trance
- Occupations: Singer, songwriter, record producer, vocal producer, disc jockey
- Instrument: Vocals
- Years active: 1995–present

David Henrard (born 13 April 1973), also known by his stage name JD Davis and Dave Davis, is a Belgian musician. He started his career in music at the age of 17 when he moved to Antwerp to work at Bonzai Records. His early releases, starting with "Transfiguration" around 1995 were under the name Dave Davis while signed to Bonzai Records. Other early aliases include Les Sabotages, Phrenetic System and Davis & Santini. He has since performed at clubs and festivals worldwide such as Mayday, Love Parade, Street Parade & Energy (Zurich), Gay Pride (Paris), Francofolies De Spa (Belgium) including a residency at Cherry Moon (Belgium).

Around 2004 saw the release of David Guetta's album titled Guetta Blaster in which JD Davis co-wrote, co-composed and sang on the singles "The World Is Mine" and "In Love with Myself". In 2004, his collaboration with Chab titled "Closer to Me" was released. In 2006, his second album collaboration with Guetta, titled Pop Life was released in which he co-wrote and sang on 3 tracks – "Winner of the Game", "Always" and "This Is Not a Love Song". The same year, Davis received the International Artist of the Year award at the Dance Music Awards in Kyiv (Ukraine) for his collaboration with Guetta, "The World is Mine" which featured his vocals. Other collaborating artists have included Antoine Clamaran, Joachim Garraud, Kiko, Sinema, Playgroup (Trevor Jackson) Tocadisco and Junior Jack.

From 2011, Davis had been working in the studio with Joachim Garraud.

In 2013, Davis released singles on UK label Skint Records as a DJ/producer with the tracks "New Skin" and "Changed" featuring Skye of Morcheeba on vocals, while contributing a remix of Skye's own single "Nowhere" for PIAS Records UK.

== Discography ==
- 1995 Dave Davis – Transfiguration (Bonzai Records)
- 2000 Dave Davis – Mutation (Bonzai Records)
- 2001 Dave Davis – Resource (Bonzai Records)
- 2001 Booba – Trkl (Tallac Records)
- 2002 Sinema – In My Eyes (Sound Of Barclay)
- 2003 Sinema – Confusion / The Riddle rmx (Universal)
- 2004 Chab & JD Davis – Closer To Me (Saw Records)
- 2005 David Guetta & JD Davis – The World Is Mine (Virgin / EMI)
- 2005 David Guetta & JD Davis – In Love With Myself
- 2006 JD Davis – Bocca (GT2)
- 2007 Chab & JD Davis – Girlz (Mconvene)
- 2007 JD Davis & Yves Larock – Losing Track Of Time (Mconvene)
- 2007 JD Davis – Good Thing (Mconvene)
- 2008 Chab & JD Davis – Get High (Clarisse Records)
- 2008 Chab & JD Davis – Lonely (Clarisse Records)
- 2008 JD Davis – Thrill Factor (Mconvene)
- 2008 JD Davis – Life in the Extreme (Mconvene)
- 2010 JD Davis & Telex – Moscow Discow (Pschent)
- 2010 DJ Ralph & JD Davis – Good Thing (Juicy Music)
- 2010 JD Davis – Promised Land (Selecta Beats)
- 2012 Skye – Nowhere – Dave Davis remix [PIAS]
- 2013 Dave Davis feat Skye – Changed (Skint Records)
- 2013 Dave Davis – New Skin (Skint Records)
- 2014 Dave Davis – UP (Skint Records)
- 2014 Kolombo & Dave Davis Looking for Something (Suara)
- 2014 Kolombo & Dave Davis Looking for Dub (Suara)
- 2014 Kolombo & Dave Davis Go for It (Suara)
- 2014 Dave Davis & Kolombo – Girlz in Wonderland (Skint Records)
- 2022 DJ From Mars feat JD Davis Sunglasses at Night (Sony France)
- 2023 Oliver Heldens, DJ From Mars & Jd Davis Blue Monday (Heldeep Records)

== Collaboration albums ==
- 2002 Sinema – Love Emulator (Sound Of Barclay)
- 2004 David Guetta – Guetta Blaster (Gum Records / Virgin EMI)
- 2005 Chab – Dubs, Edits Whisky-Coke (Saw Records)
- 2005 David Guetta – Pop Life (Gum Records / Virgin EMI)
- 2005 Tocadisco – Toca 128.0 FM (Superstar Records)
- 2007 Chab – AEIOU (Imago Gramophone Records)
