= Give Me More =

Single by Tara McDonald
- Released: 2012
- Studio: Mercury Records
- Length: 3:31
- Label: Mercury Records
- Songwriters: Tara McDonald * Maegan Cottone * Luciana Caporaso * Nick Clow * Jerome Riouffreyt * Andras Vleminck
- Producers: Jerome Riouffreyt and Andras Vleminck

Tara McDonald singles chronology
"Shooting Star" (2013)	"Give Me More" (2012)	"I Need a Miracle" (2016)

"Give Me More" is a song by British singer Tara McDonald. It was serviced to radio independently by Tara McDonald and her management team without a record label. The song was immediately playlisted by NRJ radio in France and Belgium leading to many record labels offering McDonald contracts. McDonald signed to Mercury Records and the song was officially released in 2012. Lyrically, the song discusses a sexual theme with much innuendo. The music video for "Give Me More" was released on through McDonald's YouTube channel. It was directed by Alex Ubeda and Tao Zemzemi.

== Recording and release ==
McDonald co-wrote "Give Me More" with Maegan Cottone, Luciana Caporaso and Nick Clow and the song's producers Jerome Riouffreyt and Andras Vleminck. The song was recorded in Riouffreyt's home studio in Berlin and mixed by Grammy award-winning mix engineer Wes Clarke in London.

== Music video ==
The music video was officially released on McDonald's YouTube channel on 1 May 2012, directed by Alexandre Ubeda and TAO ZEMZEMI with editing & visual effects by DiX-STREECT. McDonald asked Alexandre Ubeda to direct the video after working together with Playboy France and also when he directed her in the "Dymanite" video, her collaboration with Sydney Samson. The video was shot at a private house in Paris owned by Paolo Calia (who was also the set designer for Italian director Fellini). McDonald was the first artist allowed to film in Paolo's house; he also appears in the music video around the table.

=== Synopsis ===
The video centralises around three themes: "give me more money", "give me more food" and "give me more sex". The look is inspired by Tim Burton's Alice in Wonderland (2010 film) as McDonald is a massive fan of the director and McDonald wanted a theatrical video which is bright, humorous but also with a bizarre dark edge. The opening shot of the clip begins at a large table shot in black and white. McDonald falls asleep and wakes in an almost technicolored world full of interesting characters.

== Live performances ==
Tara McDonald at Salon du Chocolat 2012

McDonald performed the song live on the NRJ music tour in Paris alongside Justin Bieber, and the French popstar Jenifer (singer) in Bordeaux, Lille, and Brussels. At the Salon du Chocolat 2012, McDonald was wearing a chocolate dress and entered the stage in a flying chocolate space ship, which was featured on the news in many countries worldwide. McDonald also performed the song at FG radio's 20th anniversary party in Paris at the Grand Palais and at the festival Festival Voix Du Gaou supporting LMFAO. McDonald also performed "Give Me More" when she headlined Marseille Pridein France 2012; the Haarlem Jazz Festival with orchestra in the Netherlands and at the Warriors For Love (Strijders Voor De Liefde) televised concert in Amsterdam for RTL 4 during Pride 2013 with live orchestra.
