= Britta Persson =

Swedish singer-songwriter (born 1981)

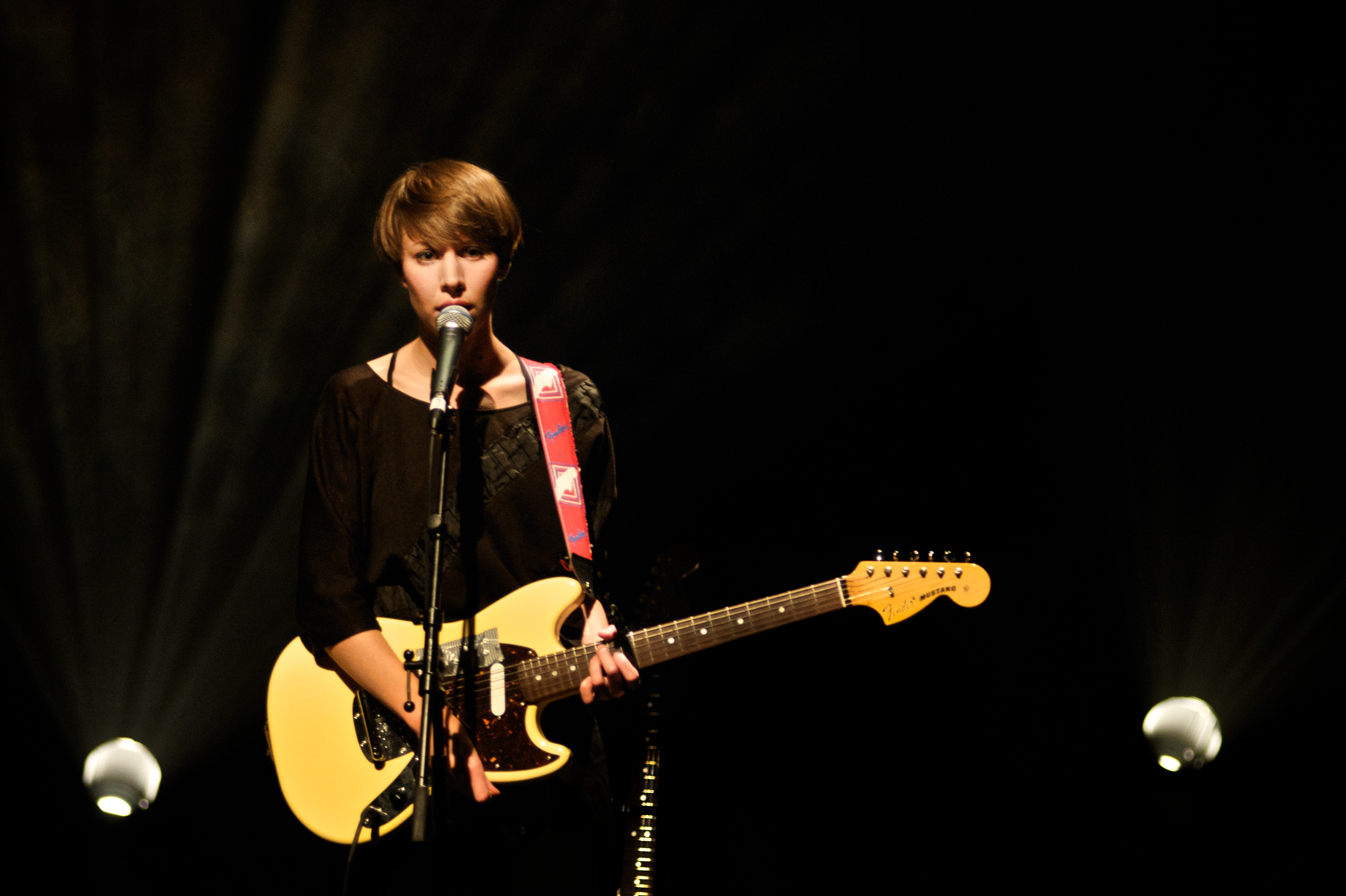
- Persson in 2009

Background information
- Born: 1981 (age 43–44); Vattholma, Sweden
- Genres: Indie pop
- Years active: 2004–present
- Labels: Selective Notes / Razzia
- Website: brittapersson.com

Britta Persson (born 1981) is a Swedish indie pop singer-songwriter.

== Biography ==
Persson was born 1981 in Vattholma, Uppsala Municipality. She went to school at Uppsala musikklasser in Uppsala, having Veronica Maggio in her parallel class and played grunge in the late 1990s.

Her musical career began when she sent a demo to Kristofer Åström, and he invited her on his 2005 tour for the album Loupita. She was then able to sell 2,000 home-burned demo CDs online.

She had her breakthrough in 2006 with the album Top Quality Bones and a Little Terrorist. Additionally, Persson was the composer in the TV series Dejta. The single "Winter Tour" got high rotation on radio in Scandinavia and a couple of years later also received recognition in Europe due to a TV advertising campaign.

In 2008 the follow-up album Kill Hollywood Me was released. Persson has worked with Camera Obscura.

In 2012, Persson helped co-write the song "So Young So High" by Swedish duo Dada Life. The year after, she released her fourth album, If I Was a Band My Name Would Be Forevers.

In 2015, she was featured on "You Hunch" by Patrik Arve, who was then performing as Swedish Tiger Sound.

In August 2019, Persson released Folk – dikter och toner om personer. It was a collaboration with sisters Emma and Lisen Adbåge, who were also releasing a children's book with the same title. In 2023, Persson released an album and poetry collection, both named Alla är barn, with illustrations by Emma and Lisen Adbåge.

== Discography ==
=== Studio albums ===
Year	Album	Peak positions
Year	Album	SWE
2006	Top Quality Bones and a Little Terrorist	53
2008	Kill Hollywood Me	27
2010	Current Affair Medium Rare	31
2013	If I Was a Band My Name Would Be Forevers	22
2019	Folk – dikt och toner om personer	–
2023	Alla är barn	–

=== EPs ===
- 2004: Demo 1
- 2004: Demo 2
- 2005: Found at Home
