= Vay-K =

Single by Tara McDonald featuring Snoop Dogg
- Released: 13 October 2014
- Recorded: 2013
- Genre: Pop; hip hop
- Length: 3:19
- Label: Universal Music Group; Mercury
- Songwriters: Tara McDonald; Calvin Broadus, Jr.; Nathan Duvall; Kiris Houston
- Producers: Nathan Duvall; Tara McDonald

Tara McDonald singles chronology
"Shooting Star (Tara McDonald song)" (2013)	"Vay-K" (2014)	"I Need a Miracle" (2016)

Snoop Dogg singles chronology
"You and Your Friends" (2014)	"Vay-K" (2014)	"Stuck on a Feeling" (2014)

"Vay-K" is a song British singer-songwriter Tara McDonald, released as the third single from her debut studio album in Europe. The song features American rapper Snoop Dogg.

== Background and composition ==
"Vay-K" was written by Tara McDonald, Nathan Duvall (who also produced the track and among other credits produced and co-wrote "Move" for Little Mix selling Gold in the UK and Australia), Kiris Houston (Best Writer - Latin Grammy Awards) and Snoop Dogg AKA Calvin Broadus. Production for the song was handled by Nathan Duvall. The song was mixed by Mr. Jones (Double Platinum Awarded for mix work on Tinie Tempah's "Pass Out" and "Frisky" produced by Labyrinth) and mastered by the man with over 45 no. 1's in England Dick Beethman.

Tara McDonald chose to collaborate with Snoop Dogg.

("Bitch I'm On) "Vay-K" is an "upbeat club-ready pop record infused with hip hop. The lyrical theme of record is about being in the moment, making one's own rules and living in the moment and giving yourself a break—a "Vay-K" (American slang for holiday).

This is not the first time Duvall and McDonald have made a record together, as they also co-wrote and produced "Shooting Star", featuring the platinum-selling artist Zaho (the song also appeared on Zaho's Congeous re-edition album) and it was the second single of Tara's debut album to be released later this year.

== Live performances ==
Tara McDonald performed "Vay-K" live on Fun Radio's LIVE concert in Albi, France on 21 February 2015 alongside French artists Soprano, Muttonheads, Lee Mashup and Tenny and at Contact FM Grand Live concert on 24 February 2015 at Pasino de Saint Amand Les Eaux alongside French artists M Pokora, Black M, Soprano, Louane, Chawki and Tenny. McDonald used giant pink inflatable flamingos on stage for the song.

== Charts ==
Chart (2014)	Peak position
Belgium (Ultratip Bubbling Under Wallonia)	17
Belgium Dance (Ultratop Wallonia)	26
