= Nuits Blanches =

Studio album by Clara Morgane
- Released: 2010
- Recorded: Paris
- Genre: R&B, hip hop, funk, electronica
- Label: Strategic Marketing

Clara Morgane chronology
DéCLARAtions (2007)	Nuits Blanches (2010)

Nuits Blanches is the second studio album by Clara Morgane, released on 29 November 2010. Its best ranking regarding sales in France has been 108th so far.

== Track listing ==
#	Title	Length
1.	"Vous"	2:56
2.	"Le Diable Au Corps"	3:21
3.	"Même Si Je Sais"	3:49
4.	"Celle Que Je Suis"	3:42
5.	"Mademoiselle X"	3:14
6.	"Il"	3:34
7.	"Good Time"	3:48
8.	"French Kiss"	3:28
9.	"Nuit Blanche "	3:41
10.	"Un Peu Beaucoup"	3:33
11.	"Hype"	3:44
12.	"Le Diable Au Corps" (Radio Edit)	3:45

== Credits ==
Words: Clara Morgane

== Singles ==
- Le Diable au Corps (2010)
  - Le Diable au Corps - 3'45
- Il (2011)
  - Il - 3"34
  - Il (Didarclub Remix By Jey Didarko) - 3"38
  - Il (Remix Hakimhakli)- 3"40
- Good Time (2011)
