= Our Nation =

Our Nation may refer to:

- Our Nation (1983), political party founded by Martin Webster, former member of the National Front in the UK
- Our Nation (2018), political party founded by Henry Bolton, former leader of the UK Independence Party
- Our Nation (album), by Dada Life, 2018

== See also ==
- One Nation (disambiguation)
