= DéCLARAtions =

Studio album by Clara Morgane
- Released: 2007
- Recorded: Paris
- Genres: R&B, hip hop, electronic
- Length: 40:23
- Label: Columbia

Clara Morgane chronology
DéCLARAtions (2007)	Nuits Blanches (2010)

DéCLARAtions is the first studio album by Clara Morgane, released on June 18, 2007. Its best ranking regarding sales in France has been 46th (in June 2007).

The single "Sexy Girl" has been ranked 4th.

== Track listing ==
#	Title	Length
1.	"Sexy Girl"	3:09
2.	"J'aime" (feat. Lord Kossity)	3:18
3.	"Je Garde De Toi"	3:20
4.	"Nous Deux"	3:35
5.	"Altitude"	2:52
6.	"HéRoïNe"	3:39
7.	"Strip-Tease" (feat. Six Coups Mc)	3:25
8.	"Fais-Moi Voyager" (feat. Darren)	3:28
9.	"La SoiréE" (feat. Napoleon Da Legend)	3:21
10.	"Maternelle"	3:36
11.	"Sans CléMence"	3:06
12.	"Andy"	3:34

== Credits ==
Words: Clara Morgane

== Singles ==
- "J'aime" (2007)
  - "J'aime" (feat. Lord Kossity) - 5:00
- "Sexy Girl" (2007)
  - "Sexy Girl" - 3:10
  - "J'aime" - 3:24
  - "Andy" - 4:08
- "Nous Deux" - remix by Tom Snare (2008)
  - "Nous Deux" - 3:32
