= Olle Cornéer =

- Born: Olof Cornéer
- Origin: Stockholm, Sweden
- Genres: Electro house, progressive house
- Years active: 2002–present
- Labels: Dim Mak Records, Breastfed, Ministry of Sound Australia, Pickadoll, Southern Fried, Prestel, Musical Freedom, So Much Dada, Gigolo Records, Deeplay Soultec, PIAS, Ninja Tune Compost
- Website: olofcorneer.com

Olle Cornéer also known as Olof Cornéer is a Swedish disc jockey and producer from Stockholm, known best as being one half of the DJ duo Dada Life

== Career ==
=== Dada Life ===
Dada Life is a DJ duo consisting of Olle Cornéer and Stefan Engblom. The group's major hits include "Rolling Stones T-shirt", "Happy Violence", "Kick Out The Epic Motherf*cker", "Unleash the F*cking Dada", "White Noise / Red Meat", "Feed The Dada" and their remixes of "Dynasty" and "Llove" by Kaskade (feat. Haley), "Big Bad Wolf" by Duck Sauce, "Who Is Ready To Jump" by Chuckie, and "Prutataaa" by Afrojack and R3hab.

Dada Life additionally hold two Guinness World Records, for the world's largest pillow fight and the largest gathering of people dressed as fruit

=== Name ===
Dada Life is named after the Dada art movement in 20th century Europe. Dada was a form of artistic anarchy fighting against the cultural, political, and social values of the time. In the same way, Dada Life and rave culture as a whole is a protest to return to the experience of the body and away from the capitalistic and rationalist dogma of today's society.

=== Night Gestalt ===
Night Gestalt (named for the German psychological therapy practice) was launched in 2015 after Olle was diagnosed with cancer. Night Gestalt is described as "everything Dada Life isn't" and has so far released an eight-track debut album entitled One.

=== Dibaba ===
Dibaba is a solo-project from Olle focusing on house/techno music. Dibaba has released more than ten EPs, one album, and numerous remixes, on labels such as Gigolo Records, Deeplay Soultec, PIAS, Ninja Tune and Compost.

=== Art Projects ===
Bacterial Orchestra was released in 2006 as a "self-organizing evolutionary musical organism". The installation consists of several audio cells, with every cell listening to its surroundings and picking up sounds, trying to play together in a musical way. The musical material comes from the background noise, people talking or sounds played by other cells. One installation (Public Epidemic No 1) received an honorary mention at File Prix Lux 2010 (Interactive Art)

Released in 2008, Chambertronica is the meeting of three chamber musicians and three electronica-artists, initiated by Håkan Lidbo, George Kentros, Olle Cornéer, Anna Petrini, Mika Takehara, and Lisa Nordström.

In 2011 Olle released "New Flesh Network" a musical performance for traditional choir, controlled via a network by the artists in real-time. Every person in the choir wears a pair of ear muffs canceling out all sounds, making them hear only the instructions that they individually receive in their in-ear headphones.

== Discography ==
=== Albums ===
- 2009: Just Do the Dada (Dada Life)
- 2010: Just Do the Dada (Extended And Remixes) (Dada Life)
- 2012: The Rules of Dada (Dada Life)
- 2013: The Rules of Dada (Fan Remixes) (Dada Life)
- 2014: Born To Rage (Remixes) (Dada Life)
- 2015: "Welcome To Dada Land" (Dada Life)
- 2015: "One" (Night Gestalt)

=== Singles ===
- "You Know I Love You" (2001)
- "Flow My Tears the DJ Said" (2002)
- "Hold You" (2003)
- "Facing You Slowly" (2004)
- "A Gift To the Night" (2004)
- "Kill Rock’n’Roll (Let it Bleed)" (2005)
- "Songs For Good Lives" (2005)
- "Love Train" (2005)
- "Big Time" (Dada Life) (2006)
- "Skiftet" (2006)
- "Saved in Dada Land" (Dada Life) (2006)
- "The Truth Blending Consortium" (2006)
- "All We Need (Emergency)" (2006)
- "Have Triangle Every Day" (Dada Life) (2006)
- "The Great Smorgasbord" (Dada Life) (2006)
- "The Great Fashionista Swindle" (Dada Life) (2007)
- "This Machine Kills Breakfasts" (Dada Life) (2007)
- "We Meow, You Roar" (Dada Life) (2007)
- "Sweeter Than Fever" (Dada Life) (2008)
- "Your Favourite Flu" (Dada Life) (2008)
- "The Great Smorgasbord" (Dada Life) (2008)
- "Cash In Drop Out" (Dada Life) (2008)
- "Sweet Little Bleepteen" (Dada Life) (2009)
- "Smile You're On Dada" (Dada Life) (2009)
- "Love Vibrations" (Dada Life) (2009)
- "Hot Chocolate + Polar Bear Rug" (2009)
- "Just Bleep Me (Satisfaction)" (Dada Life) (2010)
- "Cookies With a Smile" (Dada Life) (2010)
- "White Noise/Red Meat" (Dada Life) (2011)
- "Fight Club Is Closed (It's Time For Rock'n'Roll)" (Dada Life) (2011)
- "Happy Violence" (Dada Life) (2011)
- "Rolling Stones T-Shirt" (Dada Life) (2012)
- "This Machine Kills Ravers" (Dada Life) (2013)
- "One Smile" (Dada Life) (2014)
- "Freaks Have More Fun" (Dada Life) (2014)
- "Tonight We're Kids Again" (Dada Life) (2015)
- "DJ Sona’s Ultimate Skin Music - Kinetic (The Crystal Method x Dada Life)" (Dada Life) (2015)

== Events ==
- Dockville Festival in Hamburg, Germany (2010)
- Volt Festival in Uppsala, Sweden (2009)
- Emoção Art.ficial 4.0 in São Paulo, Brazil (2008)
- Changing Matters - the Resilience Art Exhibition in Stockholm, Sweden (2008)
- Piksel Festival in Bergen, Norway (2007)
- Gallery Takt in Berlin, Germany (2007)
- Norberg Festival in Norberg, Sweden (2007)
- New Media Meeting in Norrköping, Sweden (2006)
