= Tom Snare =

French DJ and record producer

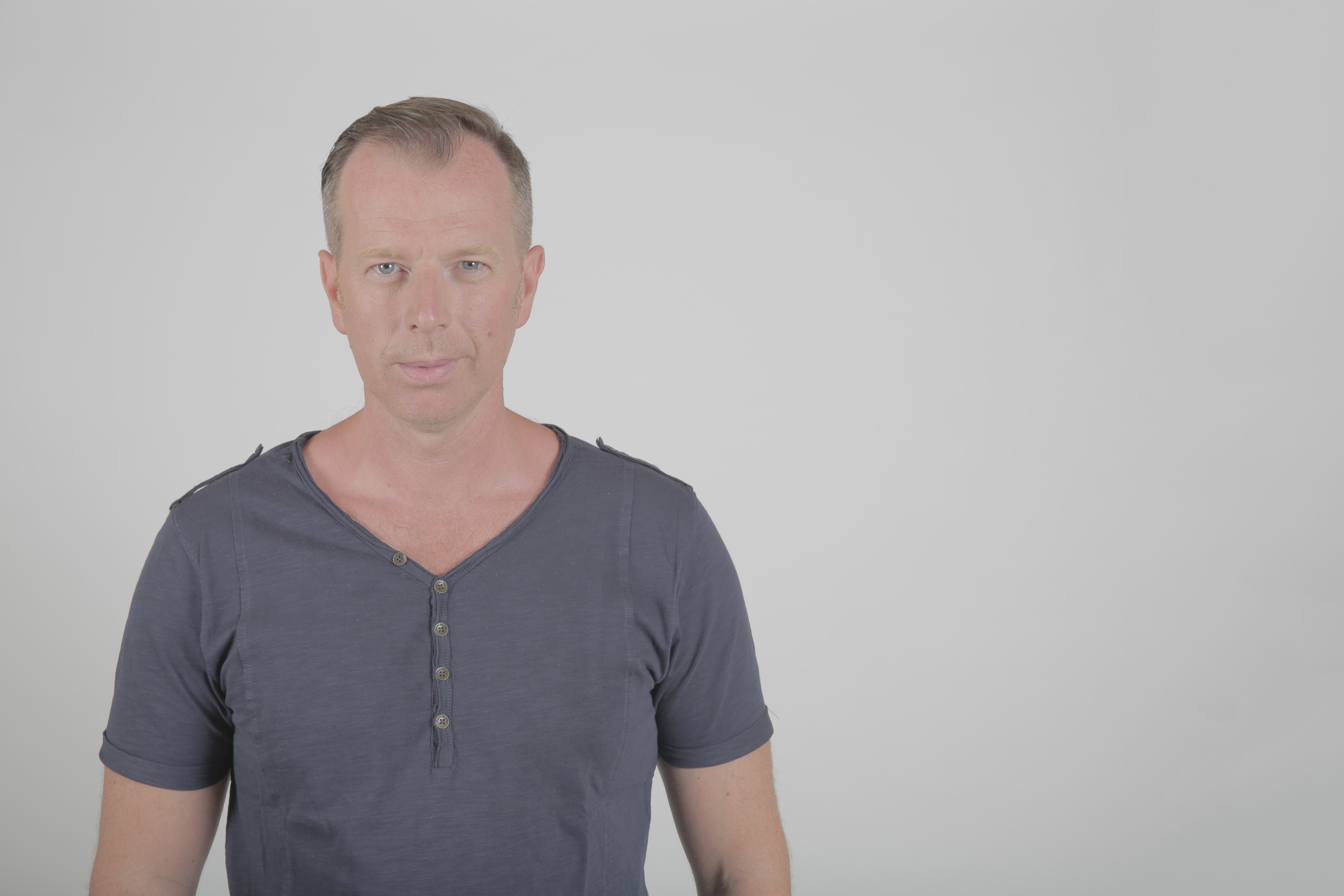

Background information
- Also known as: Blue Star, Master of Sciences, Pure Star, Undertalk
- Born: 1985 (age 39–40); France
- Genres: Electronic, house, dance, trance, French house, Eurodance
- Years active: 2003–present
- Labels: Audiopolis, Unik Sound Records, No Comment Music, Excess Music, GT², Universal Licensing Music
- Members: Xavier Decanter

Xavier Decanter (French pronunciation: [ɡzavje dəkɑ̃tɛʁ]), better known as his stage name Tom Snare, is a French DJ and record producer from Dunkirk.

== Career ==
Tom Snare rose to fame with a hit single, "Philosophy", with reached #2 in France in early 2006 and is now on the playlist of world famous DJs and bands such as Robbie Rivera, Global Deejays and Hi_Tack. Tom Snare have also released singles under other aliases, such as Blue Star, Pure Star, Master Of Sciences and Undertalk. Tom Snare's first album, Tom Snare's World, was released in October 2006.

== Discography ==
=== Albums ===
- Tom Snare's World (2006) FR#108
- Other City (2009)
- TSM (2013)

=== Singles ===
- "Waterfalls" (2003)
- "Lick It" (2005)
- "Electro Choc" (2006)
- "Love Sensation" (2006)
- "Running" (2006)
- "Rock on You" (2006)
- "Fashion Avenue" (2006)
- "More Than a Surprise" (2006)
- "Philosophy" (2006) FR#28
- "My Mother Says" (2006)
- "My Homeworld" (2007) FR#20
- "Manureva 2007" (2007) (a.k.a. Art Meson)
- "Apology" (2007)
- "Don't Talk" (2007) (a.k.a. Art Meson)
- "Find The Rhythm" (2007) (alias Tom T or Tom Tonik)
- "Waterfalls 2008" (2008)
- "Breack In" (2008) (a.k.a. Art Meson)
- "Straight Dancing" (2008) (feat. Nicco)
- "Other City" (2009) (feat. Nieggman)
- "I'm Supergirl" (2009) (feat. Nieggman) (alias Art Meson)
- "The Way To Love" (2010)
- "Shout" (2010) (feat. Nieggman)
- "Happy M.I.L.F." (2011)
- " Let You Go " (2015) (Tom Snare & Mico C)

=== Remixes ===
- "Hey Girl" - Tribal King
- "Ou Tu Veux" - Arielle Dombasle
- "Nous Deux" - Clara Morgane ft. Shake
