= Radio FG =

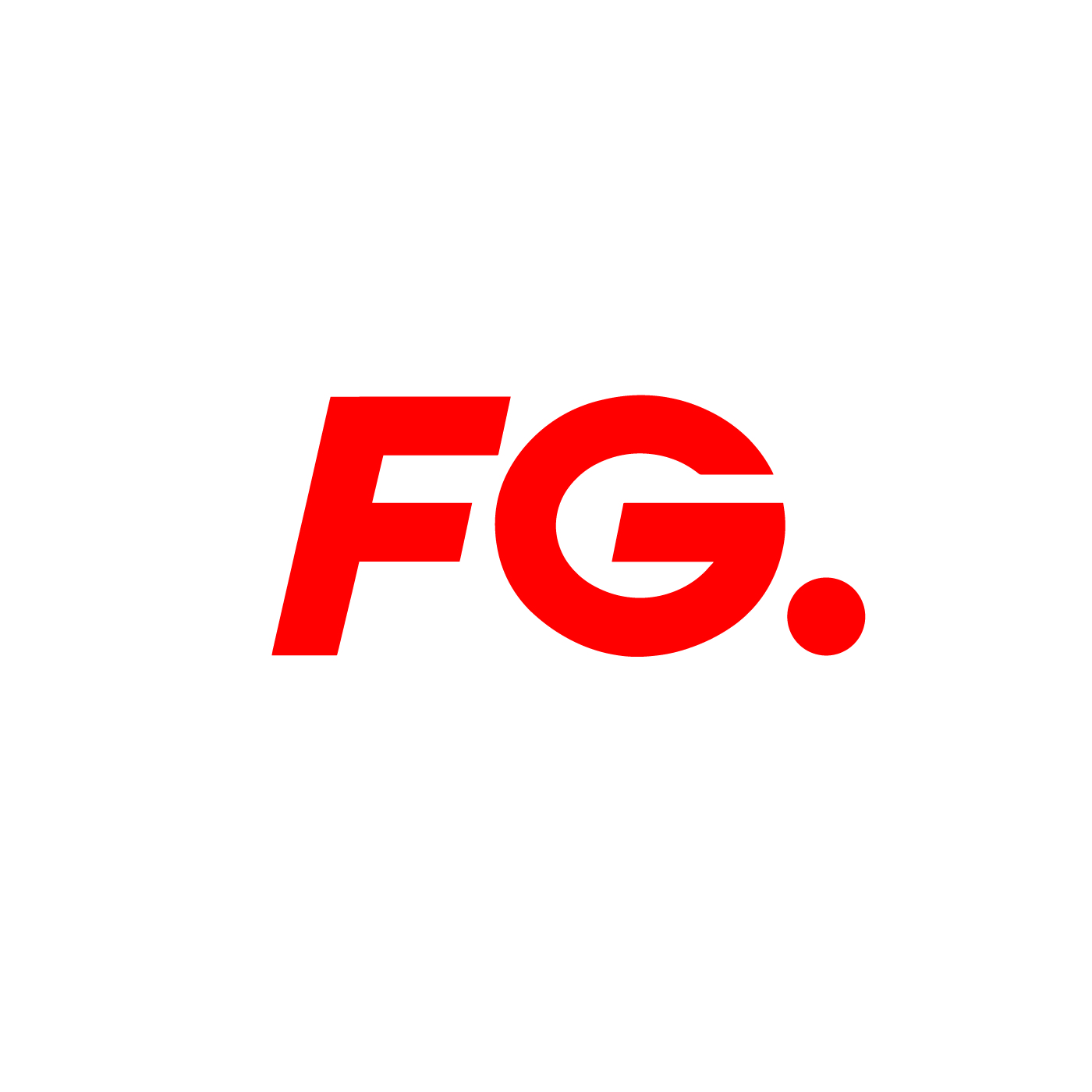
- France
- Frequencies: FM: 98.2 MHz (Paris); 100.5 MHz (Marseille)

Programming
- Format: Dance, House, Electro

History
- First air date: 1981
- Former names: FG DJ Radio

Links
- Website: www.radiofg.com

Radio FG (French: [ʁadjo ɛf ʒe]; since February 2013, also known as FG DJ Radio, acronym for Feel Good) is a French-language radio station that began broadcasting from Paris on 98.2 MHz in the FM band in 1981. It is France's first radio station that broadcasts deep house and electro house music (originally electronic and underground music). The station's current playlist is house, dance, R&B and electronica alongside several American hip-hop songs broadcast from time to time.

== History ==
Radio FG was founded in 1981 as a community radio rooted in the Parisian gay scene and in support of the gay community. The 'FG' initials were said to vary in meaning from "Fréquence Gaie" (Cheerful Frequency) to "Futur Génération" (Future Generation) to "Filles et Garçons" (Girls and Boys).

During its initial four years of broadcasting, the station faced financial struggles as well as internal conflicts, but managed to survive. As time went by, the station, facing an identity crisis, distanced itself from its social activism and re-defined itself as a dedicated electronic music station.

In 2001 Radio FG abandoned its community radio status to become a private radio station. In September 2003 Radio FG became known as FG DJ Radio and broadened its spectrum of music to include R'n'B and Raï music. Mixshows (known as Club FG for most of the time) originally accounted for 30-50 percent of the entire broadcast week. It now only accounts for 10 percent.

Today, the station broadcasts throughout the Parisian suburbs and in other major cities around France. In September 2004 the radio started a free webradio service called Underground FG. The station devotes 24 hours a day a mix of house, techno and dance music (similar to the original Radio FG), alongside older mixes that already aired on Radio FG.

The website now offers 7 different live streams: FG DeepDance, FG Undrgrnd, Club FG, FG Remix, FG House Chic, and FG Dance by Hakimakli; along with a 6-hour-delayed stream of its main station called FG +6H targeted to its North American audience. There's also a version of the regular FG DJ Radio for Belgium now: Radio FG Belgique. Formerly streams are Vintage FG (which was playing classics) and Energy Burnmix FG.

In about February 2017, Radio FG decided to replace non-stop overnight music (Monday – Thursday mornings 2 am – 5 am) by non-stop rebroadcasts of interviews airing on the drivetime show "Happy Hour FG" with Antoine Baduel. The reason for this change is still unknown, but it could be necessary to save money, especially because Mediametrie doesn't look a lot after the midnight-5 am slot. This raises concerns for the station's listeners, especially Radio FG is an electronic music station. However, Radio FG is not the first music station have to do so. NRJ (France's main top 40 station) also (until today) carries a mostly-speech output from 8 pm to 6 am (Guillaume Radio 2.0, MiKL, Le PreMorning), and Fun Radio, another electronic station, plays far less music from 8 pm to midnight every weeknight (Lovin'Fun and Le Night Show).

In September 2018, FG expanded its DAB+ network beyond Marseille, Nice, and Lille, to include its radio stations in Béthune, Lens, Arras, and Douai.

== History of logos ==
Old Radio FG logo from at least 1990 till 1999.

Old Radio FG logo from 1999 till 2000.

Old Radio FG logo from 2000 till 2006.

Old Radio FG logo used from 2006 till 2013.

Current Radio FG logo since February 2013.

== Notable DJs and presenters ==
- Bob Sinclar
- Hakimakli
- Tara McDonald for I Like This Beat
- DJ Paulette
- Martin Solveig
- Daft Punk
- Joachim Garraud
- David Vendetta
- DJ Abdel
- Benny Benassi

== Radio services and frequencies ==
=== Radio FG ===
==== France ====
- Aix en Provence : 93.4 / 100.5 / DAB+
- Amiens : 96.3
- Bastia : 94.9
- Besançon : 92.0
- Caen : 98.7
- Clermont-Ferrand: 88.8
- Compiègne : 98.2
- Corte : 88.4
- Épernay / Champagne : 90.3
- Lyon : DAB+
- Marseille : 100.5 / DAB+
- Melun / Paris Sud : 94.9
- Nice / Cannes : 96.1 / DAB+
- Orléans : 103.4
- Paris / Île-de-France : 98.2 / DAB+
- Perpignan : 100.8
- Poitiers : 103
- Reims : 94.6
- Rennes : 91.2
- Strasbourg : 98.1
- Others

==== Monaco ====
- Monaco : 96.1

==== Europe ====
- Astra 1N

=== FG Chic ===
- Paris: 6A DAB+

Lounge music and hedonism since 2013.

=== FG Chic Germany ===
- Hamburg: 7C DAB+
- Berlin: 7B DAB+

=== FG Home Party ===
Bringing the club to your crib.

=== FG Nomade ===
Mediterranean house and lounge music.

=== Starter FG by Hakimakli ===
The reference for new electro and house.

=== FG Undrgrnd ===
The sound of the underground.

=== FG -Extra ===
Not your ordinary radio.

=== Radio FG Antwerpen ===
For Flanders. It was broadcast in Antwerp on 100.2 MHz between 2009 and 2017, and also on DAB there between 2015 and 2017. Is currently online only. Top 40/house fusion "F**kin Good Music".

Previously known as "Radio FG Vlaanderen".

== Previous radio services ==
=== Club FG ===
Club music.

=== FG Berlin ===
For Berlin: 7B DAB+ Operating as FG Radio over the airwaves from 2012 until 2016. It was sometimes known as "FG Europe". Later known from 2016 until 2018 as "FG Chic" and since 2024 as "FG Chic Germany".

=== Radio FG Réunion ===
For La Réunion. From 2017 to 2019 it operated over five frequencies. Became RDJ.

=== Radio FG Mayotte ===
For Mayotte from 2012 to 2019. Became RDJ.

=== Vintage FG ===
Classic dance music.

== Compilations by Radio FG ==
- FG DJ Radio 100% TUBES (2011)
- DANCEFLOOR FG SUMMER 2009
- Dancefloor FG Summer 2008
- CLUB FG 2009
- Dancefloor FG Winter 2008
- DANCEFLOOR FG WINTER 2009
- Dancefloor Summer 2007
- Dancefloor FG Winter 2007
- FG CLUB DANCE 3
- FG CLASSICS
- FG CLUB DANCE VOL 2
- Vintage
- Underground FG vol.2
- Underground FG vol.1
- RnB Chic
- FG Club Dance
- Dancefloor FG Summer 2006
- Dancefloor FG Winter 2006
- Dancefloor FG Summer 2005
- Dancefloor FG Winter 2005
- Dancefloor FG Summer 2004
- Dancefloor FG Winter 2004
- Dancefloor FG Summer 2003
- Dancefloor FG Winter 2003
- Dancefloor FG Summer 2002
- Dancefloor FG Winter 2002
- Dancefloor FG Summer 2001
- Club FG-Zemixx-vol.2
- Club FG-Zemixx-vol.1
- After FG vol.2
- After FG vol.1

Others

- Rave Action
- Collector FG
- Club House Radio FG 98.2
- FG for ever
- After FG
- Club FG
- Dancefloor FG
- Underground FG
- Vintage FG
- FG Club Dance
- FG Classics
- R'n'B Chic
- French Touch FG
