= Tomorrow (Give in to the Night) =

Single by Dimitri Vegas & Like Mike, Dada Life and Tara McDonald
- Released: 14 July 2010
- Recorded: 2010
- Genre: EDM
- Length: 5:06
- Label: Smash The House, Spinnin Records
- Songwriter(s): Dimitri Thivaios, Michael Thivaios, Olle Corneér, Stefan Engblom, Tara McDonald
- Producer(s): Dimitri Thivaios, Michael Thivaios, Olle Corneér, Stefan Engblom, Tara McDonald

Dimitri Vegas & Like Mike singles chronology
"Under the Water" (2009)	"Tomorrow (Give in to the Night)" (2010)	"The Way We See The World" (2011)

Tara McDonald singles chronology
"Delirious" (2008)	"Tomorrow (Give in to the Night)" (2010)	"Give Me More" (2012)

"Tomorrow (Give in to the Night)" is a song by Belgian electronic DJ duo Dimitri Vegas & Like Mike, Swedish DJ duo Dada Life and English/Irish singer-songwriter Tara McDonald. The song reached number 5 in the Belgian dance charts and 16 in the commercial charts making it the biggest selling anthem for Tomorrowland to date.

== Background and composition ==
"Tomorrow" the instrumental was written by Dimitri Vegas & Like Mike and Dada Life. Dimitri Vegas & Like Mike approached Tara McDonald to write and record the song and to feature as the vocalist on the record. McDonald wrote the song and recorded her vocals at her "Love Star" studios. The song was written as the official anthem for the award-winning dance festival Tomorrowland for 2010.

== Live performances ==
In 2010 Tomorrowland sold out days before the event, with a record attendance of 120,000 visitors over two days. Dimitri Vegas & Like Mike, Dada Life and Tara McDonald performed the official anthem "Tomorrow (Give in to the Night)" song twice on the main stage at the festival after Swedish House Mafia.

== Music video ==
The official music video premiered on YouTube on 8 September 2010. The video was shot during the live performance at the Tomorrowland. Showing Dimitri Vegas & Like Mike and Dada Life at the dj console and Tara McDonald during a live PA on the MainStage during the day and night.

== Track listing ==
Digital download
No.	Title	Length
1.	"Tomorrow (Give in to the Night)" (Radio Mix)	3:22
2.	"Tomorrow (Give in to the Night)"	5:06
3.	"Tomorrow (Give in to the Night)" (Pedro Henrique & Digital Labs Remix)	7:33

The Remixes EP (Note: The Remixes EP adapted from iTunes.)
No.	Title	Length
1.	"Tomorrow (The Remixes)" (PedroHenriques & DigitalLAB Remix)	7:33
2.	"Tomorrow (The Remixes)" (Taped Remix)	6:05
3.	"Tomorrow (The Remixes)" (Wolfstep Remix)	4:54

== Charts ==
Chart (2010)	Peak position
Belgium (Ultratop 50 Flanders)	16
Portugal (Acharts)	50
