= The Rules of Dada =

Studio album by Dada Life
- Released: October 16, 2012
- Genre: Electro house
- Label: So Much Dada, Universal
- Producer: Olle Corneér, Stefan Engblom

Dada Life chronology
Just Do the Dada (2009)	The Rules of Dada (2012)	Our Nation (2018)

Singles from The Rules of Dada
- 1. "Kick Out the Epic Motherfucker" Released: March 12, 2012; 2. "Feed the Dada" Released: August 27, 2012; 3. "So Young, So High" Released: March 8, 2013; 4. "Boing Clash Boom" Released: June 1, 2013

The Rules of Dada is the second studio album by the Swedish electronic music duo Dada Life (Olle Corneér and Stefan Engblom). It was released on October 16, 2012 by Dada Life's independent record label So Much Dada and Universal. The album features a very heavily club-influenced electro house sound, and lyrically it discusses general carelessness with a lighthearted, almost humorous tone. Three of the album's eleven tracks are entirely instrumental, the remaining eight tracks feature vocals from various artists such as Britta Persson, Vincent Pontare, Michaela Shiloh, as well as Anthony Mills.

The album peaked at number 116 on the Billboard 200 during the week of November 3.

== Background and recording ==
Dada Life stated in an interview it took over a year and a half to produce "Rolling Stones T-Shirt", stating "We tried rock drums, electric guitars and even a strings section. But then we went back and just eliminated all of that. We went back to the original arrangement and added a little electronic bleep." They also noted sampling the sound of a fork being hit against a table on the album as well the sound of someone being punching in the stomach, an attempt to replicate "that ommph sound you get with a good hit."

== Release and promotion ==
"Kick Out the Epic Motherfucker" and "Feed the Dada" were released as singles, both of which charted on the Swedish song charts, peaking at number 18 and number 32 respectively. Remix albums of "Kick Out the Epic Motherfucker" and "Feed the Dada" were released on July 2, 2012 and September 10, 2012 respectively, the former featuring remixes by Datsik and Otto Knows.

== Critical reception ==
Professional ratings
Review scores
Source	Rating
Allmusic	3.5/5 stars

Speaking of Dada Life on The Rules of Dada, David Jeffries of Allmusic wrote "these merry pranksters are as 'Life' as they are 'Dada', meaning the EDM here is Deadmau5-big, Tiësto-clean, and crowd-pleasing, big-room stuff built for prime-time", noting "Kick Out the Epic Motherfucker" builds from "literate motivational seminar to lunkheaded rave riot" and cited "Rolling Stones T-Shirt" as the "singalong highlight", stating it "could have fallen off a David Guetta album."

== Track listing ==
No.	Title	Writer(s)	Length
1.	"Kick Out the Epic Motherfucker"	Adam Baptiste, Olle Corneér, Stefan Engblom, Vincent Pontare	3:23
2.	"Feed the Dada"	Corneér, Engblom, Anton Hård, Niclas Lundin	3:04
3.	"Arrive Beautiful Leave Ugly"	Corneér, Engblom	3:50
4.	"So Young So High"	Corneér, Engblom, Anthony Mills, Britta Persson	3:42
5.	"You Will Do What We Will Do"	Corneér, Engblom, Mills	4:00
6.	"Happy Violence"	Corneér, Engblom	3:49
7.	"Rolling Stones T-Shirt"	Corneér, Engblom, Mills	3:23
8.	"Bass Don't Cry"	Corneér, Engblom	3:21
9.	"Everything Is Free"	Corneér, Engblom, Mills	4:17
10.	"Boing Clash Boom"	Jon Asher, Corneér, Engblom, Hård	3:53
11.	"Don't Stop"	Corneér, Engblom	5:21

== Charts ==
Chart (2012)	Peak position
Belgian Album Charts (Flanders)	191
UK Dance Albums Chart	26
US Billboard 200	116
US Dance/Electronic Albums	4
US Heatseekers Albums	2
US Independent Albums	26

== Certifications ==
Region	Certification	Certified units/sales
Sweden (GLF)	Gold	20,000^{‡}
^{‡} Sales+streaming figures based on certification alone.

== Credits and personnel ==
- Jon Asher – songwriting
- Adam Baptiste – songwriting
- Johanna Berglund – vocals
- Olle Corneér – songwriting, production
- Stefan Engblom – songwriting, production
- Daniel Gidlund – vocals
- Anton Hård – songwriting, vocals
- Niclas Lundin – songwriting
- Anthony Mills – songwriting, vocals
- Britta Persson – songwriting, vocals
- Vincent Pontare – songwriting, vocals
- Michaela Shiloh – vocals

Credits adapted from The Rules of Dada liner notes.
