= Tara McDonald =

British singer-songwriter and vocalist (born 1976)

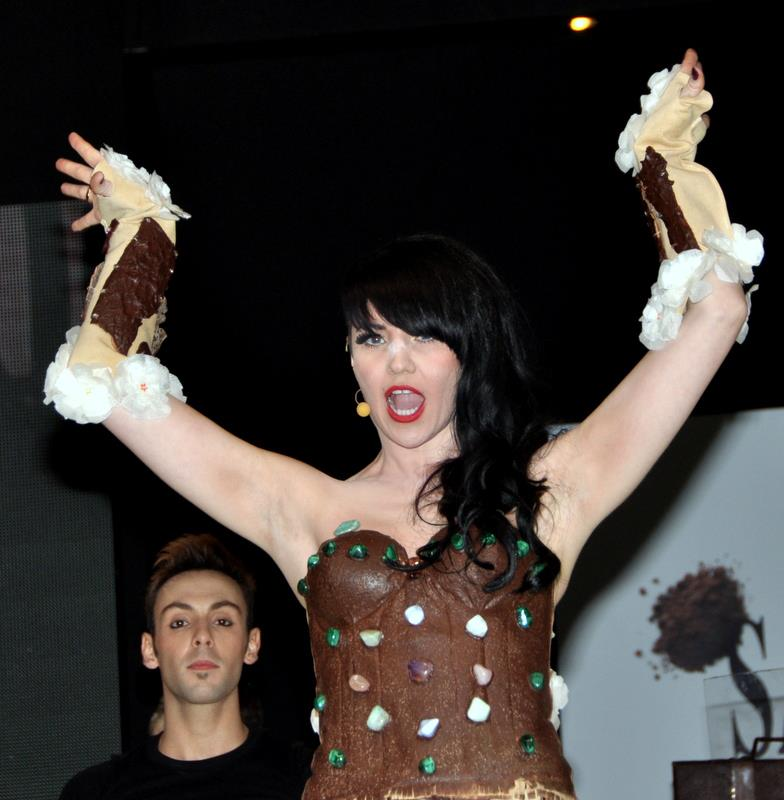
- Tara McDonald at the Salon du Chocolat (2012)

Background information
- Born: 9 September 1976 (age 50); Dartford, England
- Genres: Pop; R&B; house; dance
- Occupations: Singer-songwriter; vocalist
- Years active: 1985–present
- Labels: Mercury; Play Two; Warner Music; Universal Music Europe
- Website: taramcdonald.tv

Tara Jane McDonald (born 9 September 1976) is an English singer-songwriter and vocalist. She is signed to Play Two/Warner Music.

McDonald achieved success working and co-writing with Armand van Helden and Axwell on the chart hits "My My My" and "Feel the Vibe". Both these projects debuted at number 1 in the club charts before peaking in the UK sales charts at No. 12 and No. 16, respectively. She has also collaborated with Todd Terry, co-writing the song "Get Down", and with David Guetta, co-writing "Delirious" and "You Are Not Alone" on his platinum selling album Pop Life.

McDonald hosted her own one-hour dance music radio show called I Like This Beat (formerly called Shut Up & Dance). The program was syndicated on over 50 stations in 40 countries and released as a free podcast through iTunes.

At the start of 2012, McDonald worked as an assistant vocal coach on the first series of the TV show The Voice in Belgium alongside the French pop star Quentin Mosimann. The winner of this series, and member of Mosimann's team, Roberto Bellarosa, went on to sign a recording contract with Sony Music.

McDonald signed a three-album deal with Mercury/Universal in 2012. In 2014, she released a single featuring Snoop Dogg called "Vay-K".

Her "I Need a Miracle" single was chosen as the Europride anthem for 2016. The single charted in a number of European countries. She has been chosen to sing the world pride anthem in Amsterdam for 2026.

== Biography ==
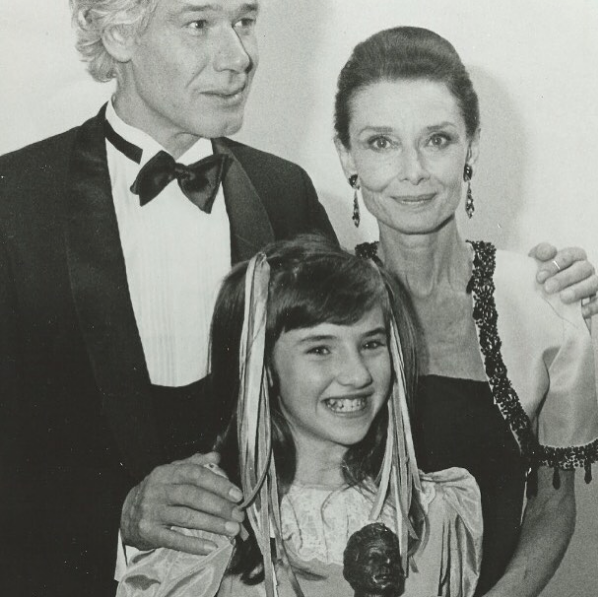
Tara McDonald, Audrey Hepburn and Paul Van Vliet at the 1st Danny Kaye Award, after winning the competition for England. (Maastricht, Holland)

=== Early life and career beginnings ===
McDonald was born in Dartford, to parents of Irish descent. At nine years old, she won her first prosessinal role playing young Eponine in Les Misérables at The Palace Theatre London, after attending an "open audition" which was advertised on the television.

At 11, she made her first television debut on BBC1's Saturday night talent show Opportunity Knocks, performing as a solo singer; she won her week and performed in the final.

At 12, she won the Danny Kaye Award for the song "Make Your Own Rainbow". Hosted by Audrey Hepburn and attended by the Queen of Holland, the show was a children's European song contest and Tara represented England. As part of the prize, McDonald became a child ambassador for UNICEF for a year when she was 12, promoting and campaigning for the "rights of the child" throughout Europe and Africa. She also performed in the National Youth Music Theatre (NYMT) production of Joseph and the Amazing Technicolor Dreamcoat with Jude Law for the Edinburgh festival, and later won the juvenile lead part in a musical called St. Bernadette at the Dominion Theatre in London. McDonald was schooled at the Italia Conti stage school then later moved to the BRIT School.

McDonald worked as a backing dancer for Karen Ramirez for promotion of her single "Looking for Love" in Europe and appeared as a backing dancer for the Jungle Brothers single, "I'll House You" including a performance on BBC1 Top Of The Pops. She also worked for the charity Combined Services Entertainment as a "forces sweetheart", providing entertainment for the UK armed forces around the world.

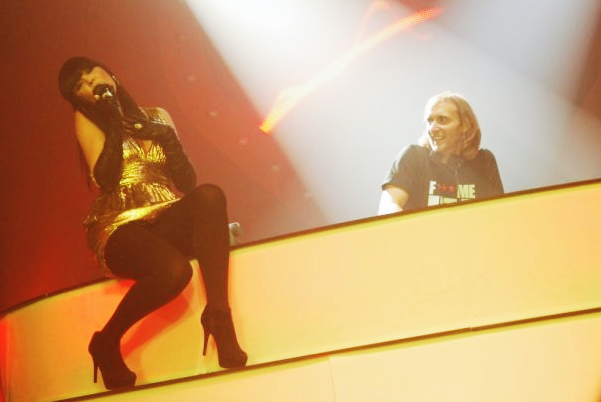
David Guetta and Tara McDonald performing "Delirious" live at Tour and Taxi in 2008 (Brussels, Belgium) Photo: Ludovic Thysebaert, 2008

She continued to write songs for other artists and work as a session singer for a range of different artists, including Spike Edney SAS band, Thunder (band), Björn Again for various gigs, tours and TV shows. She co-wrote D-Side's debut UK Top-5 single "Stronger Together" with Cliff Randall and Simon Britton. In 2003 McDonald performed on the Jagz Kooner remix of "Butterfly Caught" for Massive Attack.

=== Axwell, Armand van Helden, David Guetta & Strictly Come Dancing (2005–2012) ===
From 2004 to 2007, McDonald sang lead and backing vocals on BBC1's programme Strictly Come Dancing.

In May 2005, Desmond Lynam presented the BBC1 programme We'll Meet Again, marking the 60th anniversary of VE Day. During the show McDonald performed the song "We'll Meet Again" live.

In 2005, when McDonald was 24, she co-wrote and sang "Feel the Vibe ('Til the Morning Comes)" with Axwell, which became one of the biggest dance tracks of the year. It peaked at No. 1 on the UK Dance Singles Chart and No. 16 on the UK Singles Chart, and also charted in Finland, the Netherlands and France. McDonald's next release was "My My My" with Armand Van Helden in 2006, My My My" which reached number 4 on the world internet charts, number 5 in the Belgian and Dutch charts, number 6 in Australia, number 12 in the UK, and top 30 in the world dance charts and entered the UK commercial charts at No. 11. Both tracks became dance anthems and McDonald performed them on Pete Tong BBC1 dance show in Ibiza. In 2007 McDonald co-wrote two tracks on David Guetta's third studio album, Pop Life, the hit single "Delirious" Peaked at #24 on Billboard's Dance/mix show airplay chart for 20 weeks in 2008. and an album track entitled "You're Not Alone". Guetta later described her as a "tigress on stage" and "the chic sexbomb of electro music."

McDonald also co wrote two singles with Todd Terry on his All Stars project "Play On" and "Get Down". "Get Down" Peaked at #11 on 12 January 2007 spending 20 weeks on Billboard Dance/mix show airplay.

McDonald worked with Bryan Ferry on his Dylanesque album as a backing singer, arranging some of the vocal harmonies, and toured with him for a year. In 2009 McDonald featured on and co-wrote the song "Revolution" by Vibers, (written as the anthem for the electronic music festival Liberty Parade) which won best electronic track of the year in Romania. In 2010 McDonald collaborated on songs with several artists including: "I'm Your Goddess" with David Vendetta; "Elevated" with the Australian dance duo TV Rock; "Everything", "Funkerman", and "Beats for You" with Mischa Daniels; and "Set Me on Fire" with Sidney Samson.

McDonald performed with the "Leo Green experience" as a guest vocalist at jazz venues in the UK like Ronnie Scott's. She performed at a 2008 show for the charity Childline Rocks at O2 Indigo, London. In 2011 McDonald performed at the festival 24hrs of Burning House at Smederevo Fortress, Serbia.

McDonald won "Best Female Voice of 2010" in electronic music from OnlyForDj's magazine in a worldwide competition voted on by the public. In 2012, McDonald presented three awards at the NRJ DJ awards in Monaco.

In 2011, McDonald released "Dynamite" with Sidney Samson on Spinnin Records and the remix by Nicky Romero became one of the most-successful club tracks of that year with over 2 million views on YouTube. With David Guetta and Afrojack, McDonald released "Pandemonium" from the 2011 FMIF Ibiza mix album which reached No. 2 Switzerland, No. 3 France, and charted in Austria and Spain. She also co-wrote, sang and produced the vocals for "Tomorrow (Give in to the Night)", the anthem to Tomorrowland 2010 with Dimitri Vegas, Like Mike and Dada Life, which was an international club hit and broke the Top 20 in Belgium. She released the record Generation 24/7 though Hed Kandi Records on 12 December 2011.

=== Radio show and The Voice (2012–2013) ===
In 2012 McDonald started a weekly late-night radio show called Shut Up & Dance. She was the only non-GJ to have a show on FG Radio (France and Belgium). In 2013 the show was renamed to I Like This Beat and was syndicated in 45 countries, Emirates, and as a free podcast on iTunes.

In 2012, McDonald was the assistant vocal coach on The Voice in Belgium, working alongside the Swiss pop star Quentin Mosimann. In 2012, McDonald signed a two-album deal with Mercury/Universal, soon after releasing the single "Give Me More".

McDonald performed "Give Me More" alongside Justin Bieber, Jennifer, 1789 and Merwan Wim at the NRJ Music Tour de Paris. She performed a show at the Grand Palais in celebration of 20 years of FG radio in Paris. McDonald performed "Give Me More" live at the 18th Salon du Chocolat at the Parc des Expositions Porte de Versailles on 30 October 2012, wearing a dress made entirely of chocolate and arrived on stage in a chocolate space ship.

=== "Shooting Star", Zaho and Paris Olympia (2013) ===
McDonald released her second solo single, the duet "Shooting Star" featuring Zaho. It also appears on the 2013 re-release of Zaho's album Contagieuse selling gold. She performed the song with Zaho and a full live band at an electronic party called So Happy in Paris held at the Paris Olympia.

McDonald was the only non-Dutch artist to be asked to perform at Strijders Voor De Liefde Warriors For Love, a special televised concert to raise awareness for equal rights for LGBT citizens.

=== Ambassador of Paris Pride and "Vay-K" (2014) ===
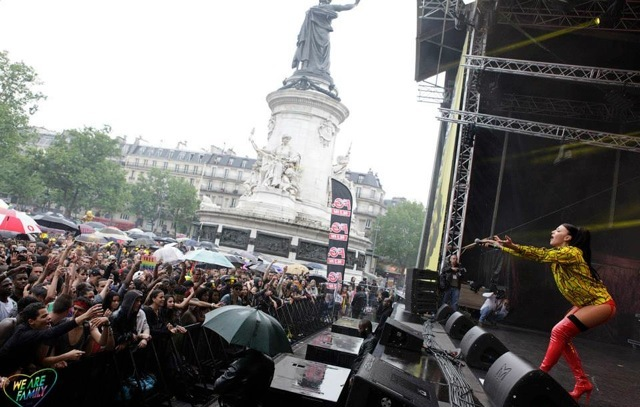
Tara McDonald headlining Paris Pride 2014, Place de la Republique

McDonald was chosen to be the ambassador, a.k.a. La Marraine (the sponsor), of LGBT Paris Pride. Her duties included a presentation for a press conference, delivering a speech to open the march in front of 500,000 people, performing on the main stage and delivering a speech to close the year's event. She performed an electric set at Ultra Music Festival in South Korea alongside M.I.A. and Far East Movement. McDonald's performance at the Exit Festival sister festival Sea Dance received positive reviews, performing on the main stage.

Her third single "Vay-K" was released in October 2014, and featured Snoop Dogg.

=== "A Place to Go" with Investo (2014) ===
"A Place to Go", the dance track of the DJ / producer, Investo, with vocalist McDonald, played on Greece's radio stations and climbed to the Top 50 of the Official Greek Airplay Chart. The track released by the dance company, Down2Earth Records, was on the Greek iTunes Chart and the Shazam Chart.

=== "Happy Hour" (2015) ===
McDonald released "Happy Hour" on the compilation album TPMZ together with hit French TV show TPMP. The song was co-written by McDonald, producer Tefa, Trackstorm and Ben Adams from UK boy-band A1. The track was picked to be the album's lead single and released ahead of McDonald's solo single "Girls Just Wanna Funk".

=== "I Need a Miracle", Europride anthem / Europride ambassador and "Love Me" (2016) ===
On 15 January 2016, McDonald released the single "I Need a Miracle" (a cover of the 1996 Coco Star song) through Mercury Universal Records in France and Bip Records in Belgium. "I Need a Miracle" charted #18 Portugal, #47 France and #15 iTunes Global charts France, #5 iTunes Pop charts France,#6 Spotify Viral charts France,#1 iTunes Global charts Belgium, #1 iTunes Dance charts Belgium, #3 iTunes Global charts Portugal, #1 iTunes Dance charts Portugal & #20 iTunes Dance charts Italy. This track is better known worldwide from the mashup "Toca's Miracle" by Fragma, which was a No. 1 hit in 14 countries in 2000. McDonald believed the lyrics were significant at a time of war and religious friction and could help bring people together. It was used as the official anthem of EuroPride 2016. McDonald opened Europride at Dam Square in Amsterdam and performed the song at the Human Rights concert with a full orchestra.

"I Need a Miracle" was also featured in the British film White Island starring Billy Zane and UK singer/rapper Example.

McDonald collaborated with Spanish singer-songwriter Juan Magan on the single "Love Me", which she co-wrote with Mexican boy-band Urband 5.

=== "Taxxxi" and new recording contract ===
In 2017, McDonald signed a new recording contract with Play Two/Warner Music France for an album deal. She released the first solo single, "Taxxxi" on 10 November 2017. McDonald first performed Taxxxi live headlining Winter pride in Gran Canaria 2017 Taxxxi charted in the UK & French club charts #7 UK upfront club charts #8 commercial pop charts #18 Cool cut charts UK and #5 buzz chart #13 club charts in France.

=== "Money Maker" featuring Zion & Lennox ===
On 3 May 2019, McDonald released "Money Maker", featuring Latin Grammy winners Zion & Lennox through Play Two/Warner Music France, the song was licensed through Ditto Music for Latin America, 9122 Records for India, Magic Records in Poland and surrounding territories, Roton for Romania, Universal Music Mena for Middle East & North Africa The official music video was released on 2 May 2019 directed by Felicity Ben through Hi Five Production. McDonald 1st performed the single on TV on TucasaTv MVS in Mexico, and at Amsterdam Pride 2019.

=== Rawdolff feat Tara McDonald ===
In 2021, McDonald featured on Rawdolff's single, "Outta My Head", reaching top 3 in the UK Pop Chart In 2022, McDonald co-wrote and featured on Rawdolff's "Downtown" reaching the Top 4 Upfront Club Chart and Top 5 in the Commercial Pop Chart in the UK, followed by single "Lose You", which contained a sample of Robert Miles "Children", remixed by Anton Powers

== Philanthropy ==
On 11 June 2005 and 20 May 2006, McDonald joined the Band Du Lac (an all-star supergroup brought together to play occasional charity concerts in aid of HASTE (Heart And Stroke Trust Endeavour). With Gary Brooker of Procol Harum directing from the piano, a backing band that included Andy Fairweather Low and Mike Rutherford on guitars, Paul Carrack on keyboards and Henry Spinetti on drums, gave support to a host of musicians including Eric Clapton, Katie Melua, McDonald, Roger Taylor (Queen drummer), Ringo Starr and The Drifters.

On 13 March 2008, McDonald was asked to perform at The Childline Rocks charity show held at Indigo2 in London, raising money for the UK children's charity Childline. Hosted by Bob Harris, the bill included Roger Daltrey, Lulu (singer), Ian Paice, Glenn Hughes, Thunder (band), The Zombies, FISH, Marillion, Russ Ballard, and Brian Bennett.

On 9 June 2011, McDonald performed as the only international artist at 'Girls First' concert with the New Amsterdam Orchestra, in The Netherlands, an event organised by children's charity Plan to promote the rights of girls which was broadcast by Avro TV Nationwide. Other artists waylon, Glennis Grace, Anita Meyer, Xander de Buisonjé, Ben Saunders, Alain Clark, Birgit Schuurman, Clarence Bekker, Dazzled Kid, Giovanca, Jacqueline Govaert, Jelka van Houten, Lois Lane, Martin Buitenhuis, Miss Nina, Paul de Munnik, Postman, Racoon, McDonald, New Gospel Sensation, Daphne Bunskoek, and Gerard Ekdom

On 6 October 2012, McDonald performed at the Night For Life at PrideMetz arena concert in France to raise money for Cancer Night For Life - a televised charity event supporting children with terminal diseases. She performed alongside Tal, Big Ali, Jean Roch, Cascada, and Craig David.

McDonald was invited to perform at Teleton por La Vida on 5 December 2015 in Guayaquil, Ecuador. She performed her single "I Need A Miracle' and a melody of greatest hits to raise money for the Teleton foundation which made $1.5 Million for the children in Guayaquil.

In 2016, McDonald gave her single "I Need A Miracle" to be included in the #WEHELPU music compilation, where all proceeds are given to help raise money for those affected in the earthquake in Italy which was released on 16 September 2016.

Also in 2016, Europride chose McDonald to be one of the official ambassadors and her single "I Need A Miracle" to be the official anthem with a special remix by Dutch DJ/producer Gregor Salto which was used to promote equality and LGBTQIA+ rights.

In 2020, McDonald released a new version of "I Need A Miracle" for UNICEF to raise money for children around the world affected by COVID-19.

== Discography ==
=== Singles ===
- "Outta My Head" - Rawdolff and Sidney Samson featuring Tara McDonald - Seventeen Production - 2021
- "One Track Mind" – Tara McDonald featuring Jey Blessing and Mad Fuentes – Play Two – 2021 (co-written by Tara McDonald)
- "I Need a Miracle (Stay Home)" – Tara McDonald – Play Two – 2020
- "Skeletons" – Tara McDonald – Play Two – 2019 (co-written by Tara McDonald)
- "Money Maker" – Tara McDonald featuring Zion & Lennox – Play Two – 2019 (co-written by Tara McDonald)
- "Taxxxi" – Tara McDonald – Play Two – 2017 (co-written by Tara McDonald)
- "Love Me" – Juan Magan featuring Urband5 and Tara McDonald – Universal Music Mexico – 2016 (co-written by Tara McDonald)
- "I Need a Miracle" – Tara McDonald – Universal Music France – 2016
- "Happy Hour" – Tara McDonald featuring Tefa and Trackstorm – Universal Music France – 2015 (co-written by Tara McDonald)
- "Till The End" - Matt Nash featuring Tara McDonald Code Red Records - 2015 (co-written by Tara McDonald)
- "A Place To Go" - DJ Investo featuring Tara McDonald - Down2Earth Music Group - 2014 (co-written by Tara McDonald)
- "Vay-K" – Tara McDonald featuring Snoop Dogg – Universal Music France – 2014 (co-written by Tara McDonald)
- "Shooting Star" – Tara McDonald featuring Zaho – Universal Music France – 2013 (co-written by Tara McDonald)
- "Fix of You" – Tara McDonald – Universal Music France – 2013 (co-written by Tara McDonald)
- "Give Me More" – Tara McDonald – Universal Music France – 2012 (co-written by Tara McDonald)
- "Pandemonium" – David Guetta and Afrojack featuring Tara McDonald – EMI Records – 2011
- "Generation 24/7" – Tara McDonald – Hed Kandi – 2011 (co-written by Tara McDonald)
- "All Alone" – Quentin Mosimann and Tara McDonald – Universal Records – 2011
- "Dynamite" – Sidney Samson vs Tara McDonald – Spinnin Records – 2011 (co-written by Tara McDonald)
- "Set Me on Fire" – Sidney Samson vs Tara McDonald – Spinnin Records – 2011 (co-written by Tara McDonald)
- "Tomorrow (Give into The Night)" – Dimitri Vegas & Like Mike, Dada Life and Tara McDonald – Smash The House – 2010 (co-written by Tara McDonald)
- "Can't Stop Singing" – Mowgli and Tara McDonald – Data Records – 2010 (co-written by Tara McDonald)
- "Beats For You" – Mischa Daniels and Tara McDonald – Armada Music – 2010 (co-written by Tara McDonald)
- "Everything" – Funkerman and Tara McDonald – Flamingo Records – 2010 (co-written by Tara McDonald)
- "I'm Your Goddess" – David Vendetta vs Tara McDonald featuring Alim Gasimov – DJ Centre – 2010 (co-written by Tara McDonald)
- "Elevated" – TV Rock and Tara McDonald – Neon Records – 2010 (co-written by Tara McDonald)
- "La La Land" – Joey Negro and Tara McDonald – Blanco Negro Records – 2010 (co-written by Tara McDonald)
- "Shake It" – Lee Cabrera vs Thomas Gold and Tara McDonald – CR2 Records – 2009
- "Revolution" – The Vibers and Tara McDonald – Roton – 2009 (co-written by Tara McDonald)
- "Love Crazy" – Warren Clarke and Tara McDonald – Hed Kandi – 2008 (co-written by Tara McDonald)
- "Delirious" (from the album Pop Life) – David Guetta featuring Tara McDonald – EMI – 2008 (co-written by Tara McDonald)
- "You're Not Alone" (from the album Pop Life) – David Guetta featuring Tara McDonald – EMI – 2008 (co-written by Tara McDonald)
- "Play On" – Todd Terry Allstars featuring Tara McDonald – Strictly Rhythm Records – 2007 (co-written by Tara McDonald)
- "Get Down" – Todd Terry Allstars featuring Tara McDonald – Strictly Rhythm Records – 2007 (co-written by Tara McDonald)
- "Take Me I'm Yours & Let Me In" (from the album Music Takes Me) – Stonebridge – Stoneboy Records – 2007 (co-written by Tara McDonald)
- "My My My (Funktuary)" – Armand Van Helden featuring Tara McDonald – Southern Fried Records – 2006
- "Feel The Vibe (Till The Morning Comes)" – Axwell featuring Tara McDonald – Data Records/Ministry of Sound – 2005 (co-written by Tara McDonald)

== Singles ==
=== As lead artist ===
Title	Year		Peak chart positions															Album
Title	Year	AUS	AUT	BEL (Flanders)	BEL (Wallonia)	BUL	HUN	ITA	DK	FRA	GER	NLD	POR	ROM	SWE	SWI	UK	Album
"Give Me More"	2012	—	—	72	—	—	—	—	—	107	—	—	—	—	—	—	—	Non-album singles
"Shooting Star" (Tara McDonald featuring Zaho)	2013	—	—	16	—	—	—	—	—	28	—	—	—	—	—	—	—	Non-album singles
"Vay-K" (Tara McDonald featuring Snoop Dogg)	2014	—	—	—	17	—	—	—	—	—	—	—	—	—	—	—	—	Non-album singles
"I Need a Miracle"	2016	—	—	17	—	—	—	—	98	47	—	—	4	—	—	—	—	Non-album singles
"Taxxxi"	2017	—	—	85	—	—	—	—	—	—	—	—	—	—	—	—	—	Non-album singles
"MoneyMaker featuring Zion & Lennox"	2019	—	—	85	—	—	—	—	—	—	—	—	—	—	—	—	—	
"—" denotes a recording that did not chart or was not released in that territory.

=== As a featured artist ===
Title	Year		Peak chart positions																		Album
Title	Year	AUS	AUT	BEL (Flanders)	BEL (Wallonia)	BUL	HUN	IRE	ITA	DK	FRA	GER	MEX	NLD	POR	ROM	ESP	SWE	SWI	UK	Album
"Feel the Vibe" (Axwell featuring Tara McDonald)	2005	—	—	53	—	—	—	38	—	—	4	—	—	62	—	—	—	—	—	16	Non-album singles
"My My My" (Armand Van Helden featuring Tara McDonald)	2006	—	—	12	—	—	—	25	—	—	—	—	—	—	14	—	—	—	—	12	Non-album singles
"Delirious" (David Guetta featuring Tara McDonald)	2008	36	27	17	2	7	36	—	22	—	16	59	—	12	45	29	—	51	16	—	Pop Life
"I'm Your Goddess" (David Vendetta vs. Tara McDonald featuring Alim)	2010	—	—	12	—	—	—	—	—	—	—	—	—	—	—	—	—	—	—	—	Non-album singles
"Tomorrow (Give in to the Night)" (Dimitri Vegas & Like Mike, Dada Life and Tara McDonald)	2010	—	—	31	16	—	—	—	—	—	—	—	—	—	48	—	—	—	—	—	Non-album singles
"Beats for You" (Mischa Daniels and Tara McDonald)	2010	—	—	35	—	—	—	—	—	—	—	—	—	—	—	—	—	—	—	—	Non-album singles
"Finally" (Jay Style featuring Cozi and Tara McDonald)	2016	—	—	122	—	—	—	—	—	—	107	—	—	—	40	—	—	—	—	—	Non-album singles
"Elevated" (TV Rock featuring Tara McDonald)	2010	—	—	—	—	—	—	—	37	—	68	—	—	—	18	—	—	—	—	—	Non-album singles
"Love Me" (Juan Magan featuring Urband5, Tara McDonald)	2016	—	—	—	—	—	—	—	—	—	—	—	20	—	—	—	55	—	—	—	Non-album singles
"Pandemonium" (David Guetta, Afrojack featuring Tara McDonald)	2011	—	17	—	—	—	—	—	—	—	3	—	—	—	—	—	39	—	2	—	Non-album singles

== Activism ==
McDonald is an active supporter of LGBTQIA+ rights. She was an ambassador for Europride 2016 and her single "I Need a Miracle" was chosen as the official anthem. McDonald said "Equal rights for me is such an important issue, I believe anything less than equality is an insult! It's unjust to give a selected few preferential treatment, we are all human after all! Everybody deserves to be treated fairly, equally. This is an issue I will spend my life campaigning for, until the laws are changed to protect and implement this and for all the countries around the world to unite and have the same global vision for equality." In an interview with Maxazine magazine for the Netherlands, McDonald said "Forget about the label, it's about the person". McDonald, godmother of Paris Pride 2014 said in an interview for the weekly news magazine Le Point (France) she was "shocked by the people anti-gay marriages in France". This shows that there is still work to be done (...) We need to change attitudes and educate people." "I will always fight for equality!"

McDonald identifies as vegan and is passionate about animal rights. Tara became vegan in 2017 after meeting a Buddhist monk in Sri Lanka who was vegan. Tara calls plant based food a "good karma diet". She is an ambassador for the worldwide vegan/vegetarian restaurant guide website HappyCow. In an interview with London Vegans, McDonald said: "I thought being vegetarian was good enough. But when you know better, you do better. There's no way I would ever go back to eating animal products". "The vegan lifestyle has made me feel so good that it's only natural that I want to share it with people."

Tara McDonald identifies as a feminist.
