= DJ Paulette =

British DJ (born 1966)

- Born: Paulette Constable; 22 December 1966 (age 59); Manchester, England
- Genres: House, electro house, fidget house, progressive house
- Occupation: DJ
- Years active: 1991 – present
- Members: DJ Paulette
- Website: djpaulette.co.uk/

DJ Paulette (born Paulette Constable, 22 December 1966 in Manchester, England) is an English house music DJ. She is currently a resident for two radio programs on FG DJ Radio: Underground FG and Radio FG Paris France and hosts Space Bass on Dash Radio. In addition to her Radio broadcasts, she also has a two-hour monthly show on Pacha FM. She was Voted 'Best DJette' (French and International Scene) in the Burn FG MTV Dance Awards (2007 and 2010)

== Musical career ==
Paulette played her first dj set at the No1 Club Manchester. Her first residency was at Flesh Nites promoted by Paul Con's held at The Haçienda in the period 1991–1995. Afterwards, she then moved to London to play at the Garage club nights at Heaven, followed by residencies at The Zap Club (Brighton) and the Ministry of Sound. In 1998 Paulette has also joined a long list of DJs and Producers in having her own Essential Mix, which aired on BBC Radio 1 on 3 January 1998. She moved to Paris in December 2004 and secured a weekly residency with Radio FG in April 2005 and the Mix Club for four years. She also featured at the Redlight Club and Fashion TV (releasing two Fashion TV compilations). In October 2005 she mixed the Inaugural Mix Club Compilation which was released in February 2006. In 2013, Paulette moved to Ibiza to take up a residency at ITACA in San Antonio and also hosted Vista Club at The Privilege while in 2014 she was summer resident at the Ibiza Rocks Hotel.

== Residencies ==
Clubs

- Resident DJ-Ibiza Rocks-San Antonio-Ibiza-Spain Summer (2014)
- Resident DJ-Itaca-San Antonio-Ibiza-Spain Summer (2013)
- Resident DJ-Queens Club-Paris-France (2009–2013)
- Resident DJ-The Mix Club-Paris-France (2005–2009)
- Resident DJ – Ministry of Sound, International Tours (2000–2008)
- Resident DJ – Ministry of Sound-London-England (1996–2000)
- Resident DJ-Garage at Heaven-London-England (1996–2000)
- Resident DJ-The Zap Club-Brighton-England (1994–1996)
- Resident DJ-Flesh at The Haçienda-Manchester- England (1992–1995)
- Resident DJ-South, the No1 Club, The Boardwalk, Oscars, – Manchester (1992)

Radio

- Resident DJ-Virgin Radio-France (2014)
- Resident DJ-Radio Hit-Cairo-Egypt (2014)
- Resident DJ-Radio FG-Paris-France (2005–present)

== Awards and nominations ==
=== NRJ DJ Awards ===
Selected awards
| Year | Award | Nominated work | Category | Result |
|---|---|---|---|---|
| 2014 | NRJ Awards | DJ Paulette | Best Female DJ | Nominated |
| 2013 | NRJ Awards | DJ Paulette | Best Female DJ | Nominated |

=== Burn FG MTV Dance Awards ===
Selected awards
| Year | Award | Nominated work | Category | Result |
|---|---|---|---|---|
| 2010 | Burn FG MTV Dance Awards | DJ Paulette | 'Best DJette' (French & International Scene), | Won |
| 2007 | Burn FG MTV Dance Awards | DJ Paulette | 'Best DJette' (French & International Scene), | Won |

== Discography ==
- Clublife -(Polygram) mixed – (1996)
- Must Be The Music (Nervous) mixed – released November (2001)
- Azuli Presents Miami 2001 – (Azuli) a&r'ed (2001)
- Azuli Presents Miami – (Azuli) a&r'ed (2002)
- Contributor – 'How To Be A DJ' book (Penguin) – (2002).
- 'Laugh' single signed to Automatic Records due for release.
- Azuli Presents Miami 04 – sleeve notes and A & R'd (2004)
- Azuli Presents Miami 05 – sleevenotes (2005)
- Azuli Present Space Ibiza 05 – a&r consultant & sleeve notes
- FASHION TV compilation – (June 2005).
- FASHION TV compilation – Winter Session (December 2005).
- MIX CLUB PARIS compilation – (February 2006).
- FG IBIZA Fever – Tool Room CD (2010).
- Privilege Ibiza – Deep House Vista Club CD – (2013).
