= Tom Snare's World =

Studio album by Tom Snare
- Released: 30 October 2006
- Genre: Electronic, house, dance, trance, French house, Eurodance
- Length: 74:28
- Label: Universal Licensing Music

Singles from Tom Snare's World
- 1. "Philosophy" Released: 2005; 2. "My Homeworld" Released: 2007

Tom Snare's World is the first album by Tom Snare.

== Track listing ==
1. "Waterfalls (Radio Edit)"
2. "Philosophy (Radio Edit)"
3. "My Mother Says"
4. "My Homeworld"
5. "Electro Choc"
6. "Love Sensation"
7. "Lick It"
8. "Running (I Can't Stop Loving You)"
9. "Rock On You"
10. "Fashion Avenue"
11. "More Than A Surprise"
12. "No Dreams"
13. "Philosophy (Remix)"
14. "My Mother Says (Extended Mix)"
15. "Waterfalls (Electro Extended Mix)"
16. "My Mother Says (My Piano Mix)"

== Credits ==
- Xavier Decanter wrote, composed, produced and mixed the album.

== Charts ==
Chart (2006)	Peak position
French Albums (SNEP)	108
