= One Nation (disambiguation) =

One Nation is a political party in Australia.

One Nation may also refer to:

== Politics ==
=== Australia ===
- One Nation NSW, a defunct splinter group political party that operated exclusively in New South Wales
- Pauline Hanson's One Nation – New South Wales, the currently affiliated political party operating in New South Wales
- Pauline Hanson's One Nation – Queensland, a branch of the party currently operating in Queensland
- One Nation (infrastructure), an Australian program of infrastructure works in the 1990s

=== United Kingdom ===
- One-nation conservatism, a form of British political conservatism
- One Nation Labour, the theme used by the British Labour Party in 2012
- OneNation, a political party in the United Kingdom

=== Others ===
- One Nation (Fiji), a Fijian political party founded in 2026
- One Nation (Israel), a defunct party in Israel
- One Nation (United States), a conservative political non-profit organization in the United States
- PNG One Nation Party, a political party in Papua New Guinea
- World government, the concept of a single common political authority for all of humanity

== Music ==
- One Nation (album), by Hype Willams, 2011
- Onenation, a Japanese record label
- One Nation (band), an English band founded by Robbie France
- One Nation, an album by Dance Nation released in 2007
- "One Nation", a song by Sacred Reich released on Surf Nicaragua, covered by Soulfly
- One Nation, an album by Outlawz

== See also ==
- One New Zealand Party (1999–2006), a defunct political party in New Zealand based on the Australian party
- Our Nation (disambiguation)
