= Lisen Adbåge =

Swedish illustrator, comics artist and author

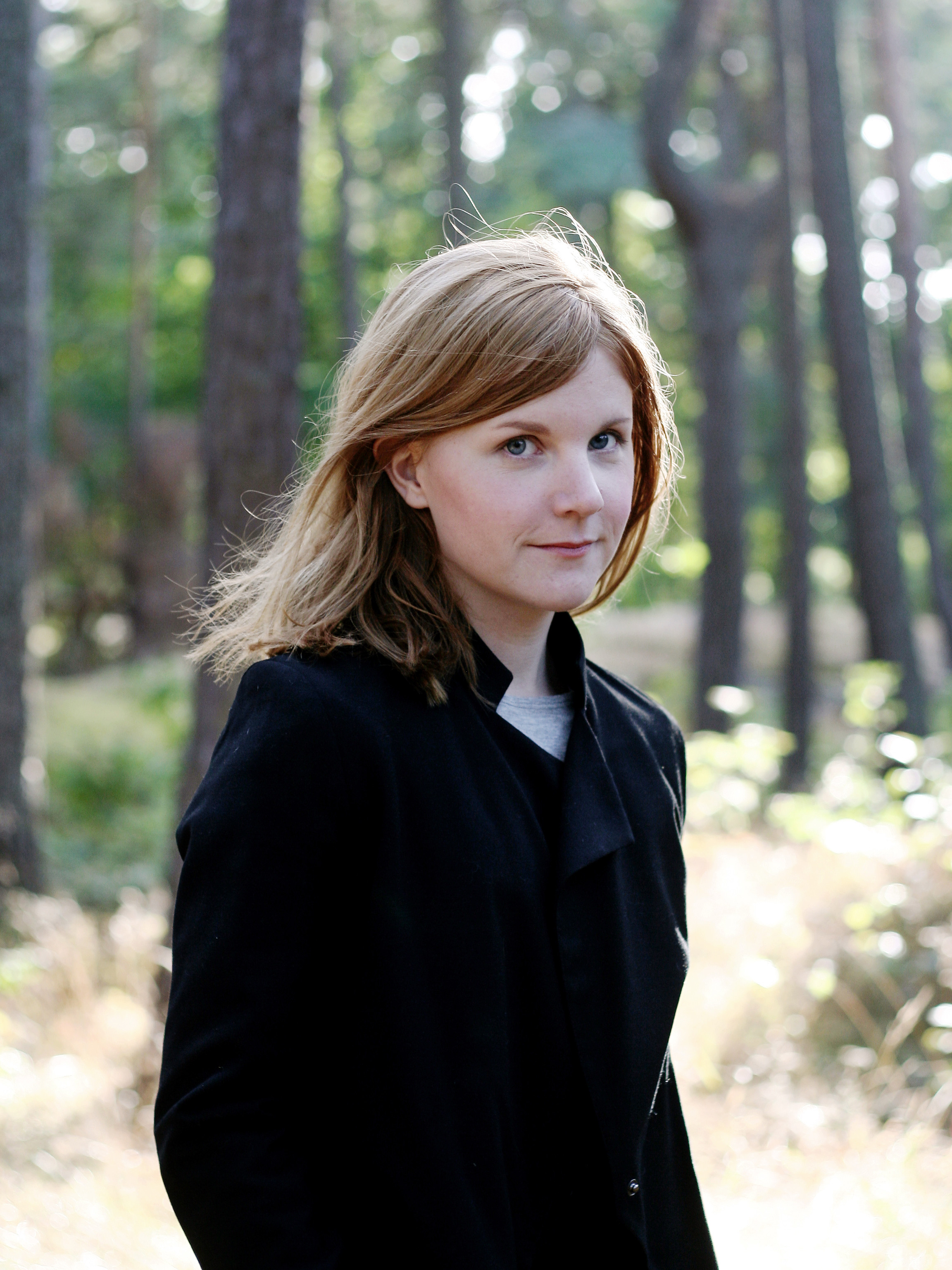
- Lisen Adbåge in 2021
- Born: December 7, 1982 (age 43); Sweden
- Occupations: Illustrator, comic book writer, children's writer
- Notable work: Kurt och Kio, Stor-Emma, Koko och Bosse
- Relatives: Emma Adbåge (twin sister)
- Awards: Elsa Beskow Plaque (2018), Expressens Heffaklump (2021)

Lisen Adbåge (born 7 December 1982) is a Swedish illustrator, comic book writer and children's writer. She is the twin sister of Emma Adbåge, with whom she has often collaborated.

== Biography ==
Lisen Adbåge was born in 1982 and grew up in Sya in Östergötland. After high school, she attended a two-year art school in Hofors. Her work includes comics for adults and children and picture books for younger children. She has said her role models are Barbro Lindgren, Kitty Crowther, Gunna Grähs and Eva Lindström.

Among her best-known children's books are Kurt och Kio, Furan and Koko och Bosse.

She has been awarded the Elsa Beskow Plaque (2018) and Expressens Heffaklump (2021), with her sister Emma.

She has been described as a modernist in children's literature, following in the tradition of Astrid Lindgren in stressing the independence of young girls, protection of nature, how to resist group pressure and other similar themes. On her 2025 book Vild, Dagens Nyheter reviewer Sandra Sundqvist wrote: "It is a colourful book on the importance of courage and rebellion.

== Works ==
- Ellen och Bebis, Eriksson & Lindgren, 2001
- Myrra 7 och en kvart (with Susanne MacFie), Eriksson & Lindgren, 2003
- Myrra 8 och ett halvt (with Susanne MacFie), Eriksson & Lindgren, 2004
- När Johan vaknar en morgon är han stark! (with Petter Lidbeck), 2004
- Monster överallt! 2007 (with Mattias Danielsson)
- Kan Man..?” (with Petter Lidbeck), Bonnier-Carlsen, 2004
- En dag i prinsessan Victorias liv (with Petter Lidbeck), Bonnier-Carlsen, 2004
- Bozze - den snälla polisen (with Petter Lidbeck), Bonnier-Carlsen, 2006
- Salmiak och Spocke (with Moni Nilsson), Raben & Sjögren, 2004
- Salmiak och Hedda (with Moni Nilsson), Raben & Sjögren, 2006
- SOMMARLOV! handbok för bästa sommarlovet, Daniel Ericsson & Adam Dahlin, Raben & Sjögren, 2007
- Rosas bondgård (with Åsa Böhme), UR-förlaget, 2007
- Händiga Hanna (with Titti Knutsson), Alfabeta, 2004-2007
- Matte & Myran (with Bengt Ingelstam), Bonnier-Carlsen/Ord&Visor, 2001-2007
- ”Häftigt!”, ”Läskigt!”, ”Konstigt!” (with Mattias Danielsson), Bonnier Utbildning, 2006-2008
- "Klantigt!" (with Mattias Danielsson), Bonnier Utbildning, 2009
- "Hemligt" (with Mattias Danielsson), Bonnier Utbildning, 2010
- "Känsligt!" (with Mattias Danielsson), Bonnier Utbildning, 2011
- Erena - rebellen från silltunnan (with Bengt Ingelstam), Ord & Visor, 2007
- Konsten att vara kompis, BonnierCarlsen/KP, 2008
- Kurt & Kio vill ha koja, BonnierCarlsen, 2009
- Flickan & Presidenten (with Petter Lidbeck), Natur & Kultur, 2009
- Malte och Moa spelar golf (with Juha Saarinen), Eriksson&Lindgren, 2006
- Åke & hans ö, 2010 (with Petter Lidbeck) Natur & Kultur
- Kurt & Kio vill ha djur, Bonnier Carlsen, 2010
- Lea, 2011, Helena karlsson, Hegas förlag
- Lea och kärleken, 2011, Helena Karlsson, Hegas förlag.
- Stor-Emma, 2011 Natur & Kultur
- Koko & Bosse, 2011, Natur & Kultur
- Tio vilda hästar, 2011, Rabén & Sjögren (with Grethe Rottböll)
- Stora bebisbytet, 2012, (with Petter Lidbeck)
- HÄSTFESTEN - tio vilda hästar hittar hem, 2013 (with Grethe Rottböll)
- Koko & Bosse - törs inte! Natur & Kultur, 2013
- Stinas skatter (PIXI-bok) 2014
- PAPPA & JAG, 2014 Bonnier Carlsen (with Ulf Nilsson)
- Koko & Bosse - hinner inte!, Natur & Kultur 2015
- Stinas ljud (PIXI-bok) 2015
- TIO VILDA HÄSTAR TILL TOPPEN, Raben & Sjögren 2015 (with Grethe Rottböll)
- "Stinas trix", Bonnier Carlsen 2016
- "Läskigt!", Sanoma 2016 (c Mattias Danielsson)
- "Tre", Alfabeta 2017 (with Per Nilsson)
- "Samtidigt som" 2017
- "Tio små förskolebarn" (PIXI-bok) 2017 (förf Ulf Nilsson)
- "Tio vilda hästar firar jul, Rabén & Sjögren 2017 (with Grethe Rottböll)
- "Halsen rapar, hjärtat slår - rim för 0-100 år!" Natur & Kultur 2017 (with Emma Adbåge)
- "Frallan är bäst", Lilla Piratförlaget 2018 (with Sara Ohlsson)
- "Frallan räddar världen", Lilla Piratförlaget, 2018 (with Sara Ohlsson)
- "Frallan och kärleken", Lilla Piratförlaget, 2019 (with Sara Ohlsson)
- "Frallan har en hemlighet", Lilla Piratförlaget, 2019 (with Sara Ohlsson)
- "Dom som bestämmer", Bonnier Carlsen 2018
- Folk: Främlingar och vänner - nån du kanske känner (2019)
- "Furan", Rabén & Sjögren 2021
- "Vild", Rabén och Sjögren 2025

== Awards ==
- Rolf Wirténs kulturpris, 2017, with Emma Adbåge.
