= David Vendetta =

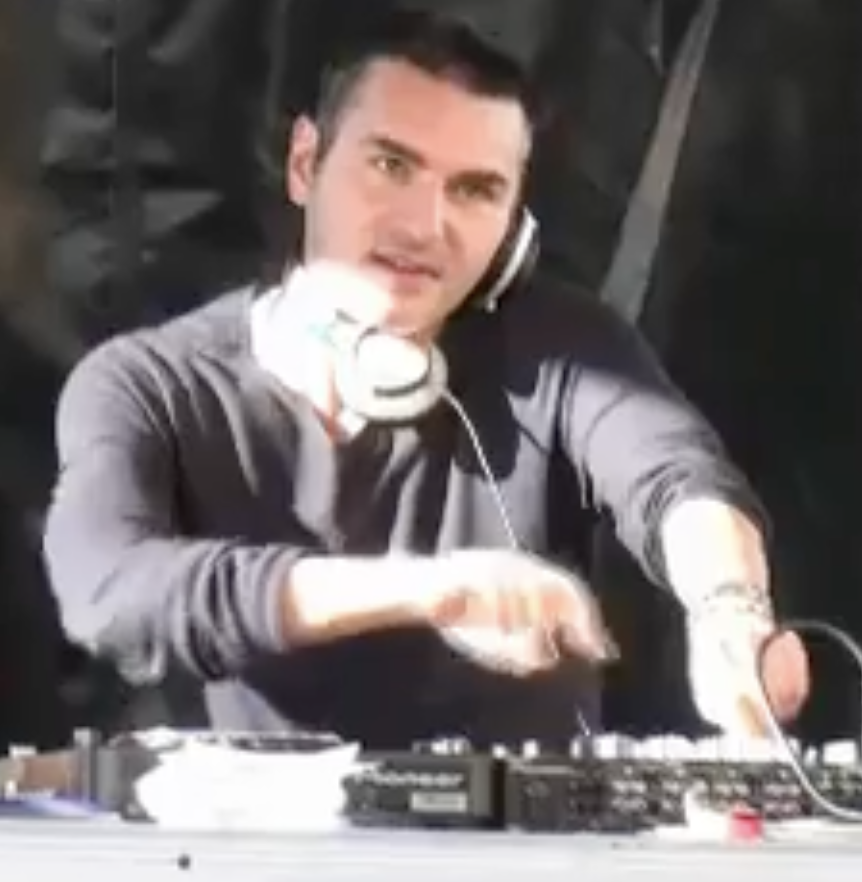
- David Vendetta performing in 2010

Background information
- Born: 25 August 1968 (age 57); Longwy, Lorraine, France
- Genres: house, electro house
- Occupations: Record producer, DJ
- Label: DJ Center Records
- Website: davidvendetta.com

David Paparusso (Italian pronunciation: [papaˈrusso]), better known by his stage name David Vendetta (born 25 August 1968 in Longwy), is a French dance producer and DJ.

== Biography ==
David Paparusso's career as a professional DJ only starts in 2002. At that time, he meets Antoine Clamaran, another popular French DJ, who produces Vendetta's first three maxi singles "Fiction – No Sex", "She Loves Me – Party People" and "Alicante – Cleopatra". He also starts working as a producer when American DJ Roger Sanchez asks him to remix some of his songs.

In 2006, Paparusso releases the song "Love to Love You Baby", which samples Donna Summer, and manages to peak at No. 20 at the French Singles Chart. The follow-up single "Unidos para la música" even reaches the Top 5 in France and the Top 30 in Belgium-Wallonia.

In addition to his work as a producer, Vendetta also animates a weekly radio show on FG DJ Radio and organizes parties in Ibiza, New York City, Moscow, Marrakesh and many other cities.

In April 2010, he returned with his second album Vendetta. It includes collaborations with artists such as Haifa Wehbe, Tara McDonald and Alim Qasimov.

In the beginning of 2010, David Paparusso filed a lawsuit against French internet phenomenon Mickaël Vendetta for unfair business practices, saying: "This guy is an impostor, a troublemaker. He only used my name to become popular". He asked for 100.000 euros in damages; however, he lost and was condemned to pay Mickaël Vendetta's 3,000 euro lawyer fees.

By 2026, Vendetta has maintained a career spanning over 28 years. He is recognized in the French Lorraine region as a pioneer of the house genre who transitioned from a fan of early 90s dance music to an international headliner. Despite the rise of new sub-genres, he continues to perform globally, maintaining the "no-compromise" house style that established his reputation in the mid-2000s.

== Discography ==
=== Studio albums ===
Year	Album details	Peak chart positions		
Year	Album details	FRA	BEL (Wal)	SWI
2007	Rendez-vous: Released: 4 June 2007; Label: DJ Center Records; Formats: CD, digital download	16	15	—
2010	Vendetta: Released: 7 April 2010; Label: DJ Center Records; Formats: CD, digital download	—	—	—

=== Singles ===
- 2003: Party People
- 2003: She Loves Me
- 2004: No Sex
- 2004: Fiction
- 2004: Alicante
- 2004: Cleopatra
- 2006: Love To Love You Baby (FR: No. 20 / Be-Wa: No. 30 / NL: #65)
- 2007: Unidos Para La Musica (FR: No. 5 / Be-Wa: #30)
- 2007: Break 4 Love (FR: No. 17 / Be-Wa: No. 17 / Fi: #14)
- 2007: Bleeding Heart
- 2008: Hold That Sucker Down (FR: No. 17 / Be-Wa: #12)
- 2008: Freaky Girl
- 2009: Anticipation (with Barbara Tucker)
- 2009: I Hope She Turns Around to see me (feat. Brian Lucas)
- 2010: I Am Your Goddess (feat. Tara McDonald & Alim) (Produced by Boris Abdul of www.mamedia.eu.com)
- 2010: Can You Feel It (feat. Brian Lucas)
- 2010: Make Boys Cry (feat. Luciana)
- 2010: She Turns Around To See Me
- 2010: Yama Layali (Many Nights) (feat. Haifa Wahbi)
