= Clara Morgane =

French singer and former pornographic film actress

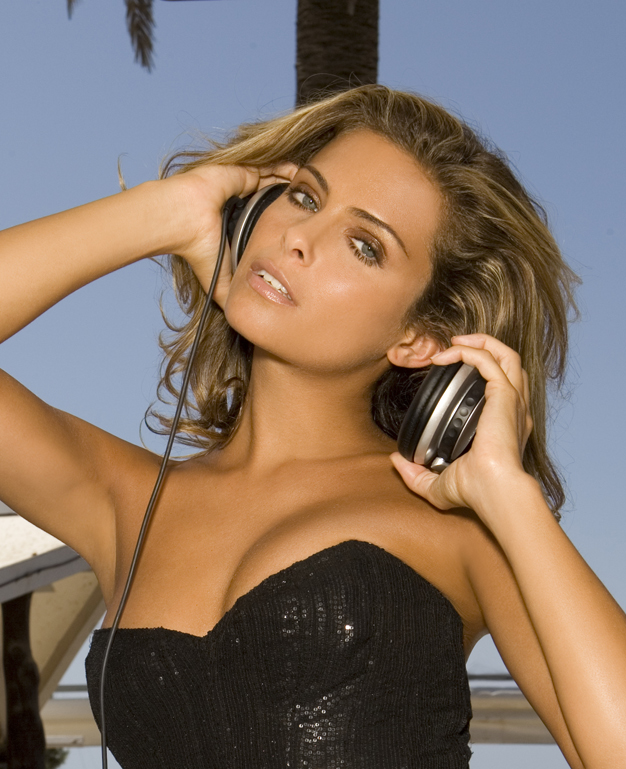
- Morgane c. 2006
- Born: Marseille, France
- Website: claramorgane.com

Clara Morgane (French pronunciation: [klaʁa mɔʁɡan]) is a French singer and former pornographic film actress.

== Biography ==
Clara Morgane first became notable as a porn star : she started making movies with her boyfriend Greg Centauro and Pierre Piot in 2000 and, after a few amateur shoots, became a professional actress. She stopped her porn career after two years and seven movies, eventually ending her relationship with Centauro who did not wish to leave the porn industry. In 2001, she started hosting on Canal+ Le Journal du hard, a magazine dedicated to the industry. She hosted it for seven years.

In 2003, she published her first autobiography, Sex Star.

In 2007, she started a singing career. Rudy Lansard and Abdel Maalikoom produced her first song J'Aime. Her debut album, DéCLARAtions was released 18 June 2007, with a mixture of funk, hip-hop and R'n'B. Clara Morgane wrote the lyrics for all the songs. The first single, J'Aime featuring rapper Lord Kossity, and Sexy Girl have been available online since 26 March 2007. In 2019, she participated in the tenth season of Danse avec les stars – the French version of Dancing with the Stars. She was partnered with professional dancer Maxime Dereymez. On 26 October 2019 they were eliminated finishing 6th out of 10 contestants.

== Titles and awards ==
She received a Hot d'Or Award for "Best French Starlet" in 2001.

She was elected the top French and eighth sexiest woman in the world by the French edition of the magazine FHM.

== Discography ==
=== Albums ===
- 2007: DéCLARAtions (released 18 June)
- 2010: Nuits Blanches (released 29 November)
- 2014: So Excited (released 10 October)

=== Singles ===
- J'Aime (duo with Lord Kossity) (2007)
- Sexy Girl (2007)
- Nous Deux (2008)
- Le Diable au Corps (2010)
- IL (2011)
- Good Time (2011)
- Je t'Adore (2012)
- Comme Un Boomerang (2012)
- I’m so Excited (2014)
- Eve (2015)
- Mon Étage (2015)
- Ouvre (2016)

=== Music videos ===
- J'Aime
- Sexy Girl
- Nous Deux
- Nous Deux (remix) (by Hakimakli)
- Le Diable au Corps
- Beautiful Things (Tiesto) (2005)
- IL (2011)
- Good Time (2011)
- Good Time (acoustique) (2011)
- Vous/Mademoiselle X (2011)
- Je t'Adore (2012)
- Comme Un Boomerang (2012)
- Ce qu’il me faut (2013)
- I’m so Excited (2014)
- Eve (2015)
- Mon Étage (2015)
- Ouvre (2016)
- Rouge (2017)
- Travesti (2021)

== Publications ==
- (in French) Sex Star, Adcan Edition, 2003, ISBN 2-84814-009-7
- (in French) Kâma Sûtra, Adcan Edition, 2004, illustrated ISBN 2-9516572-1-8

== Companies ==
- Sarl Péché Capital Media (PCM) – created 2003-12-06
- Sarl M Holding – created 2007-04-12
