= Our Nation (album) =

Studio album by Dada Life
- Released: 4 May 2018
- Genre: Dance
- Label: Spinnin' Records

Dada Life chronology
The Rules of Dada (2012)	Our Nation (2018)

Singles from Our Nation
- 1. "We Want Your Soul" Released: 1 December 2017; 2. "Higher Than The Sun" Released: 9 March 2018; 3. "Do It Till Your Face Hurts" Released: 30 March 2018; 4. "One Nation Under Lasers" Released: 9 April 2018; 5. "Sunday F**k You Too" Released: 20 April 2018

Our Nation is the third full-length studio album by Dada Life. It was released 4 May 2018. The album was removed from all digital stores sometime in 2025, with the exception of the songs that were also released as singles.

== Background and recording ==
Prior to releasing the first single from Our Nation, "We Want Your Soul", Dada Life released several non-album singles from 2013-2017 - "Born to Rage" (which was re-released with vocals from Sebastian Bach of Skid Row), "This Machine Kills Ravers", "One Smile", "Freaks Have More Fun", "Tonight We're Kids Again", "One Last Night On Earth", "Tic Tic Tic" featuring Lzzy Hale of Halestorm, "Red Is The Color Of Rage", and "Yellow Is The Color Of Happiness". Engblom also released his debut single as a solo artist, "Pure Adrenaline", on Spinnin' Records.

In September 2017, Olle Cornéer announced his intent to take a break from touring with Stefan Engblom as Dada Life due to health issues, but stressed that he would continue to produce in studio.

Cornéer and Engblom released the first single from their then-untitled album, "We Want Your Soul", in December 2017. They followed in March 2018 with the second single, "Higher Than The Sun", alongside the announcement of the album title, release date, and tracklist.

== Track listing ==
No.	Title	Length
1.	"Our Nation (intro)"	0:45
2.	"Our Nation"	3:43
3.	"Sunday F**k You Too (feat. Anthony Mills)"	3:37
4.	"Higher Than The Sun"	3:32
5.	"Do It Till Your Face Hurts"	2:57
6.	"One Nation Under Lasers"	3:40
7.	"Happiness"	3:20
8.	"B Side Boogie"	4:00
9.	"The World Can Burn"	3:49
10.	"We Want Your Soul"	3:13
11.	"Headless Hobby Horse"	3:41
12.	"Falling Backwards In Time"	4:46
