= Emma Adbåge =

Swedish illustrator and children's writer

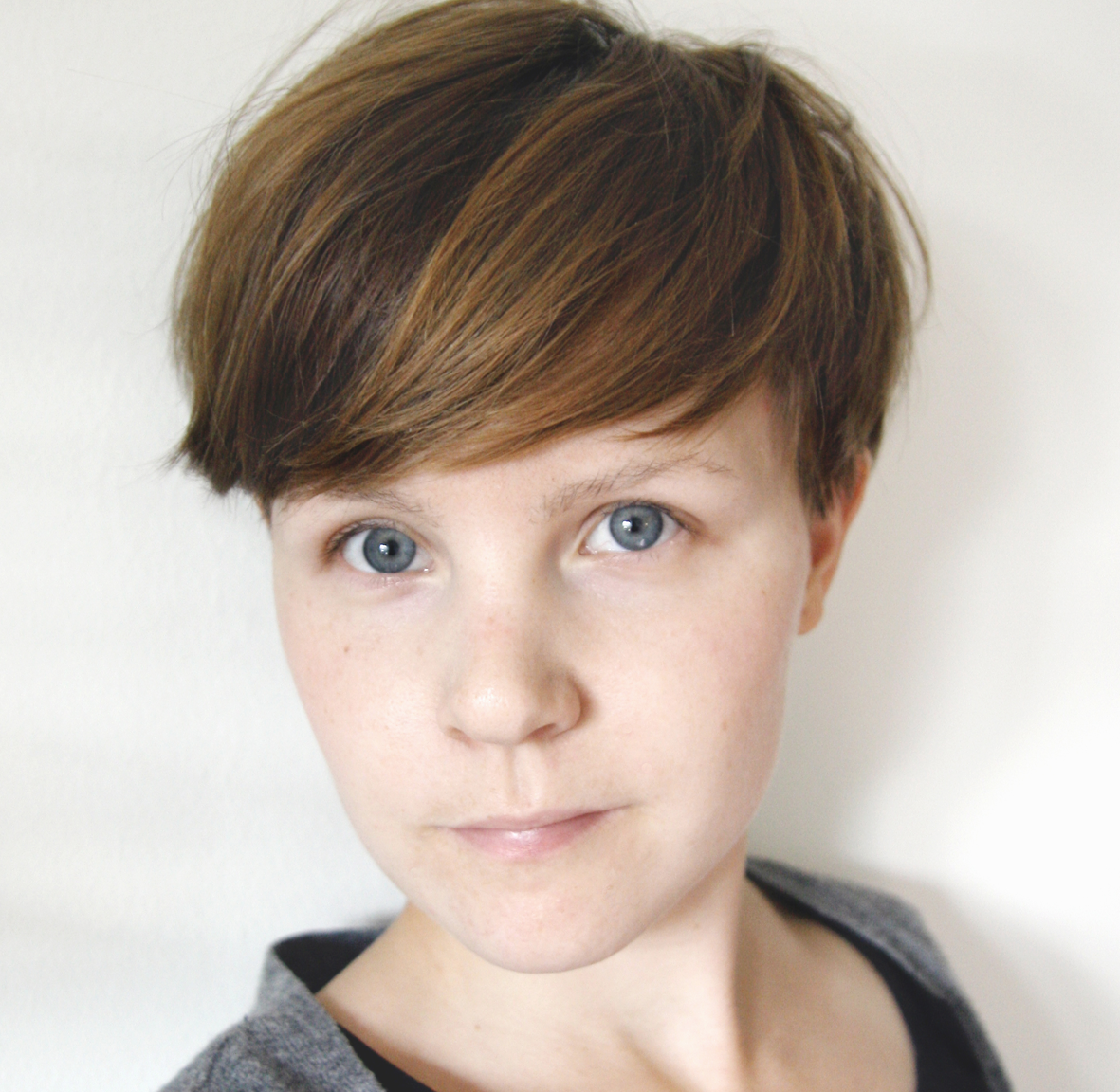
- Emma Adbåge in 2018
- Born: 1982 (age 43–44); Linköping, Sweden
- Occupations: Illustrator, children's writer
- Notable work: Leni är ett sockerhjärta, Outdoor Math, Gropen
- Relatives: Lisen Adbåge (twin sister)
- Awards: Elsa Beskow Plaque (2013); August Prize (2018); Expressens Heffaklump (2021)

Emma Adbåge (born 1982) is a Swedish illustrator and children's writer. In addition to illustrating her own books, she contributes to works by other authors while also taking on commissions from educational publishers. In 2013, she was awarded the Elsa Beskow Plaque for her illustrated Lenis Olle and other works for children.

== Biography ==
Born in 1982 in Linköping, Adbåge is the twin sister of Lisen Adbåge, who is also an illustrator, cartoonist and writer. After completing high school in Mjölby, they both studied illustration at the Cartoonist School in Hofors. By the time they were 21, they had each illustrated several books by various authors. She illustrated the debut book of Mårten Melin, Mera glass i däcken.

In 2011, for her book Leni är ett sockerhjärta (Leni is a Honeybun), Adbåge won the Silver Award for Illustration in the "Kolla!" competition arranged by the Association of Swedish Illustrators and Graphic Designers. It is the story of a little girl who initially thinks it would be interesting to act like an adult, but when she discovers all the work grown-ups have to do, she decides instead to become a baby.

Her Outdoor math: fun activities for every season (2016) has been published in English. It encourages five to eight-year-olds to learn maths by playing with objects they can find outside, such as measuring the length of a worm or building a snowman.

Adbåge's 2018 book Gropen received the August Prize in the children and young adult category. In 2021 she received Expressens Heffaklump, with Lisen Adbåge.
