= Shooting Star (Tara McDonald song) =

Single by Tara McDonald featuring Zaho
- Released: 23 August 2013
- Recorded: 2013
- Length: 3:33
- Label: Universal Music Group; Mercury Records
- Songwriter(s): Tara McDonald; Nathan Duvall; Maegan Cottone; Zaho
- Producer(s): Nathan Duvall; Tara McDonald

Tara McDonald singles chronology
"Give Me More" (2012)	"Shooting Star" (2013)

Zaho singles chronology
"Tourner la page" (2013)	"Shooting Star" (2013)

"Shooting Star" is a song by British singer-songwriter Tara McDonald, released as the second single from her debut studio album in Europe. The song features platinum selling Francophone artist Zaho.

== Background and composition ==
"Shooting Star" was written by Tara McDonald, Zaho, Maegan Cottone & Nathan Duvall (one third of the UK dance band Disciples (production team) who also produced the track and among other credits recently produced & co wrote 'Move' for Little Mix selling Gold in the Uk and Australia), and Zaho. Production for the song was handled by Nathan Duvall & McDonald. The song was mixed & mastered by Colorsound in France. (previous work includes Arnaud Rebotini, Black Strobe, David Guetta, Avicii and Yasmine Hamdan. Tara McDonald & Zaho were introduced through their management companies, when they first met they felt they had so much in common that they wanted to make a record together. In "Shooting Star" both artists wrote their lyrical parts of the song from the heart, telling their real-life stories. Tara said, "Shooting Star is a real emotional song for me as I'm laying myself bare, its my truth, a snapshot of my life captured in the music". "Shooting Star" is an "upbeat club-ready pop record. The lyical theme explores Tara's fear, but there's a strong theme of hope, overcoming obstacles and becoming stronger. This is a very positive record.

Shooting Star" dominated French radios in the summer of 2013, featuring the platinum selling artist Zaho (the song also appeared on Zaho's Congeous re-edition album) and it was the second single of Tara's debut album to be released later this year.

== Music video ==
The official music video premiered on Vevo on 10 October 2013. The video was shot in Tara's real life neighbourhood in East London. Tara is shown as a 90's chauffeur driving various people through Brick Lane and Shoreditch to their happy destination, a roof top. The video has various themes, the background artists are of different nationalities and there is also a pro LGBT message in the film. Tara's real life dog Annie a miniature schnauzer is also driven in the car. Zaho appears as the taxi boss and appears throughout the clip on a screen in the cab and then joining Tara and the other background extras on the roof of a building for the climax of the clip.

== Track list ==
Digital download

1. "Shooting Star (ft. Zaho)" – 3:33

Remixes EP

1. "Shooting Star" featuring Zaho (Jp Candela & Alexander Som remix) – 6:00
2. "Shooting Star" featuring Zaho (Jidax remix) – 6:30
3. "Shooting Star" featuring Zaho (Adam Trigger remix)) – 4:08

== Live performances ==
McDonald's first live performance of "Shooting Star" was premiered at the Olympia Hall in Paris, France where she was invited to perform at an exclusive dance music event by "So Happy In Paris". McDonald joined Zaho on stage at her concert at the Olympia concert hall, Paris to perform "Shooting Star" with full live band She also joined Zaho on her tour in France in other regional cities promoting the song together. McDonald showcased the single at Vogue Night, Paris for the make up brand "MakeUpForever" and at her performance at Paris Gay Pride 2014 when she was voted as the face "mother" of the event for that year.

== Charts ==
Chart (2013)	Peak position
Belgium (Ultratop Wallonia)	16
France (SNEP)	28
