= Grethe Rottböll =

Swedish opera singer

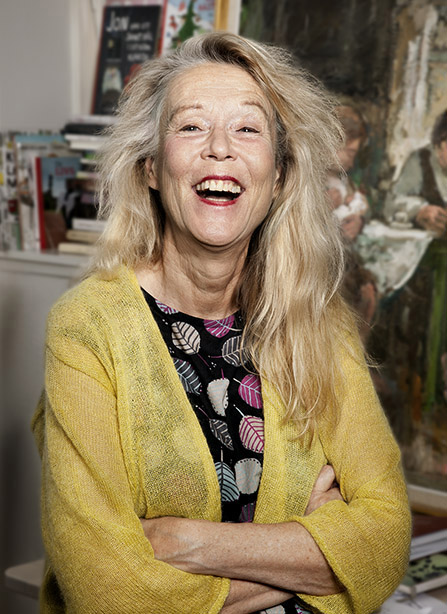
- Grethe Rottböll (2018)
- Born: Grethe Inga Poulsen; 1 February 1956 (age 70); Gothenburg, Sweden

Grethe Inga Rottböll Sund (born Poulsen, 11 February 1956) is a Swedish singer and author. She lives and works in Sweden and writes books for adults and children. During the 1990s, she worked as a singer (mezzo-soprano) in operas and operettas. Since May 2018 she is the chairman of the Swedish Writers’ Union.

== Biography ==
Grethe Rottböll grew up in a family who were all singers. She lost both her parents at a young age and decided to take her father's family name Rottböll as her last name. In 1979 she moved to Stockholm, and in 1981 published her first book called Att vara Emilia. In 1988, Rottböll published the book Rosenodlaren.

During many years in the 1990s, Rottböl' worked as a mezzosoprano singer. She sang a.o. "Cherubino" in The Marriage of Figaro, Prince Orlovsky in Die Fledermaus, and Orpheus in Orpheus and Eurydice.

Rottböll along with her husband Håkan Sund started the Bergslagenoperan in Bergslagen.

In the early 2000s, she started publishing children's books. She has also written factual books about animals and nature. Rottböll has published two books about the boy character Ole, with illustrations by Anna-Karin Garhamn. She has also published factual books on subjects like singing, rhetoric, theatre, traffic, circus and dragons. With illustration work by Lisen Ådbåge, Rottböll has published the much liked books about Tio vilda hästar (Ten wild horses). In 2013, she published the book Jon har ett svart hål i sitt röda hjärta (Jon has a black hole in his red heart); the book tells about death in a way which is understandable for children.

== Bibliography ==
Writings:

=== Novels ===
- Att vara Emilia, 1981, Norstedts]
- Rosenodlaren, 1988, Norstedts

=== Books ===
- Sant och sagolikt om sång, children's book, 1999, Alfabeta
- Hallå! tala berätta rappa, children's book, 1999, Rabén & Sjögren
- Scenrävar och teaterapor, 2002, Rabén & Sjögren
- Hitteboken, 2005, Rabén & Sjögren
- Henrys cirkus, 2005, Rabén & Sjögren
- Pang! sa det, 2007, Rabén & Sjögren
- Barnvagnsgaloppen, 2008, Rabén & Sjögren
- Ole
  - Ole hos doktor Semla och Syster Bella, 2008, Rabén & Sjögren
  - Ole får en hamster, 2009, Rabén & Sjögren
  - Ole är hungrig på godis, 2010, Egmont Kärnan
- Vad händer med jorden, 2008, Rabén & Sjögren
- Häng med i trafiken, 2009, Rabén & Sjögren
- Häng med på cykel, 2010, Rabén & Sjögren
- Alla vill ha mat!, 2011, Bonnier Carlsen
- Tio vilda hästar, 2011, Rabén & Sjögren
- Alla vill ha ett bo, 2012, Bonnier Carlsen
- Kryp som är små Var då?, 2013, Bonnier Carlsen
- Hästfesten, 2013, Rabén & Sjögren
- Jon har ett svart hål i sitt röda hjärta, 2013, Bonnier Carlsen
- Allt det här kan jag, 2014, Lilla Piratförlaget
- Tio vilda hästar till toppen, 2015, Rabén & Sjögren
- Vulkanen och kalven som Po räddade, 2016, Vombat
- Vinge äger hela havet, 2017, Rabén & Sjögren
- Första Naturhjälpen räddar djuren, 2017, Bonnier Carlsen
- Tio vilda hästar firar jul, 2017, Rabén & Sjögren ISBN 9789129691535

=== Anthology ===
- Bom bom, 2005, Rabén & Sjögren
- Smarta små upptäcker naturen, 2011, Rabén & Sjögren
- Smarta små upptäcker skolan, 2012, Rabén & Sjögren
- ABC 123, 2012, Bonnier Carlsen
- Min lilla skattkammare, 2012, Natur & Kultur
