= Hakimakli =

- Born: Cédric Aiello
- Genres: House, EDM, R&B
- Years active: 1992-present
- Website: http://www.hakimakli.com/

Cédric Aiello, better known by his stage name Hakimakli, is a French DJ, record remixer and producer, and radio broadcaster of Italian and Algerian origins. He is prominently featured on Radio FG and is talent director and director of programming at the station.

== Career ==
Cedric Aiello was raised in Lyon, France, before moving to Paris at the age of 14. In 1992, at 18, he joined Radio FG as artistic director for young talents at the station, and later on also the musical director of programming. Taking the name Hakimakli, he launched a number of successful shows most notably RnB Chic on the station and his own webradio FG Dance, became a highly popular daily channel of the FG DJ Radio list of live feeds (presently six, including FG DJ Radio, Underground FG, Vintage FG, FG Chic, Energy Burnmix FG, as well as Hakimakli's FG Dance). He also has his daily Starter FG prime time show (Monday to Wednesday from 20h to 00h and Thursday to Saturday from 20h to 23h) on the main station's programming grid.

Hakimakli is also artistic director at ClubRevolution Record Label.

He is regularly featured in electro house events, public shows and festivals like Fête de la Musique and Blueu sur le Vieux Port (Marseille) amongst others and at the radio station's very popular Podium FG at "Marche des fiertés" the Paris Gay Pride event at Place de la Bastille. In 2010, he appeared as an exclusive invitee of "Ma playlist by", DJ program on M6Music Club show on the French M6 music television channel.

He has his own eclectic metisse electro urban style. Hakimakli's first single was the hugely successful Dollaly that was used as a theme music for Astérix aux Jeux Olympiques (in English Asterix at the Olympic Games). He followed it with Dilly Dally a song featuring Jamie Shepherd who has been his biggest collaboration and is included in his new single One Love. His work has appeared in more than 10 compilations.

=== Programs on Radio FG ===
- RnB Chic
- FG Dance
- Starter FG

== Discography ==
=== Albums ===
- Electro urbain (2009)

=== Singles ===
- "Dollaly" (2008)
- "Dilly Dally" featuring Jamie Shepherd (2009) (Peak SNEP FRANCE: #10)
- "Ding Dong" (2009)
- "Faded to Black" (2009)
- "One Love" featuring Jamie Shepherd (2009)
- "Imagine" (2012)
- "St. Tropez" with Romy featuring Destiny Grace (2013)

=== Remixes ===
- "Nous deux" of Clara Morgane (also he appears in its music video)
- "Equivoque" by Tunisiano

=== Appearances in compilations ===
- Dance Floor FG
- Unighted (Cathy Guetta)

== Filmography ==
- "Dollaly", theme music for Astérix aux Jeux Olympiques.
