= Dada Life =

Swedish DJ duo

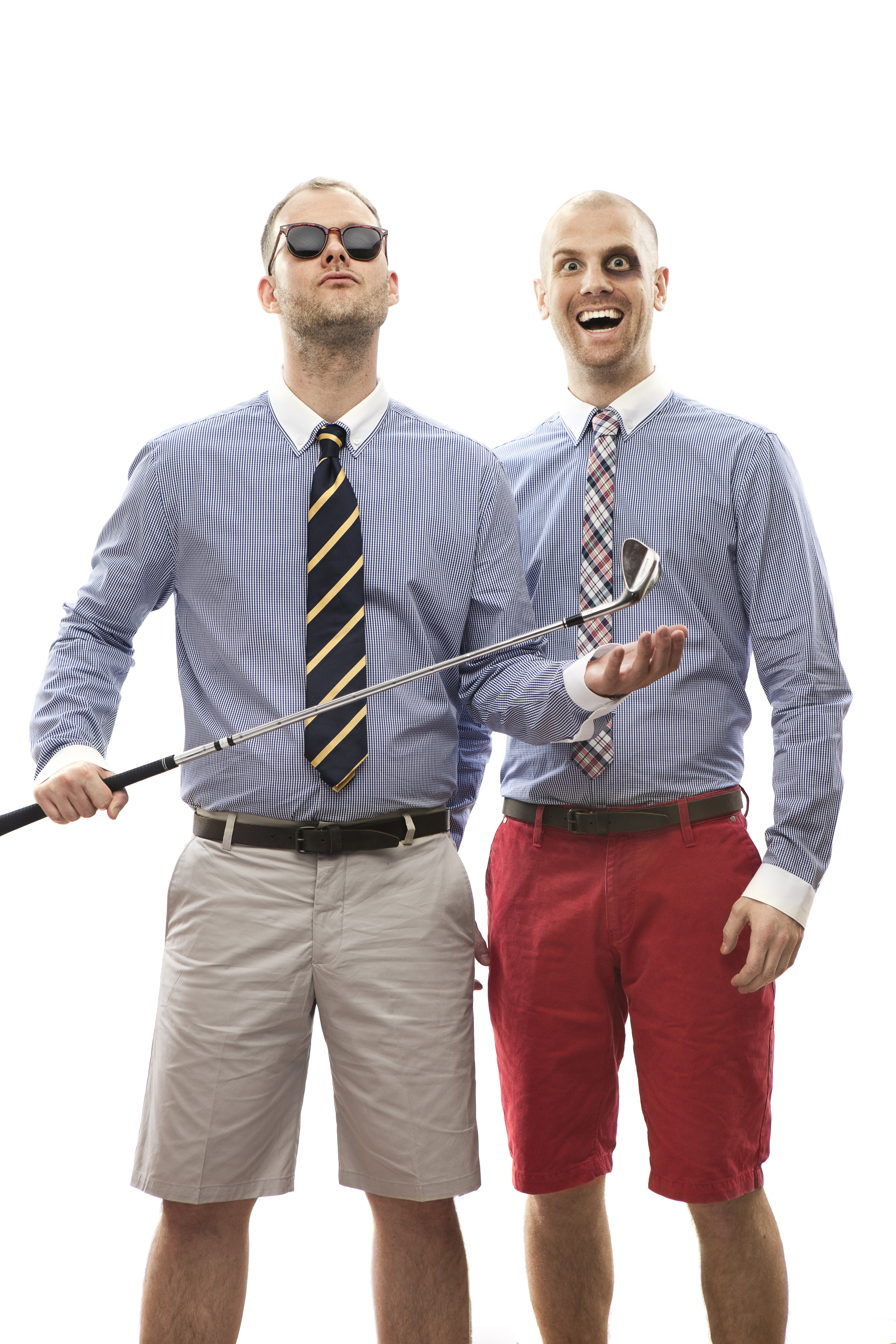

Background information
- Origin: Stockholm, Sweden
- Genres: Electro house, progressive house, big room house, future rave
- Years active: 2006–present
- Labels: Dim Mak Records, Breastfed, Ministry of Sound Australia, Pickadoll, Southern Fried, Prestel, Musical Freedom, So Much Dada, Revealed Recordings, Spinnin' Records, Monstercat
- Members: Olle Cornéer; Stefan Engblom (active on stage)
- Website: dadalife.com

Dada Life are a Swedish DJ duo formed in 2006, which consists of Olle Cornéer and Stefan Engblom. They have released three albums, a number of singles and remixes and one compilation. The duo had early chart success in Belgium and the Netherlands, while their second album The Rules of Dada reached the Billboard 200. They are known for their humour during their live performances, while their name is a homage to the absurdist movement of the early twentieth century. They have released multiple audio plugins programmed by Tailored Noise: Endless Smile, Space In-Your-Face, Wide Awake, Eternal Return and most notably Sausage Fattener, a saturator.

== Career ==
=== Early career (2006–2008) ===
Cornéer and Engblom had separate careers before they formed a duo and have released music individually since. Engblom used the moniker Phasio and released one album, Just One More Day in 2001. Cornéer used the name Dibaba and released Songs For Good Lives in 2005. Dada Life came into being in 2006 when the duo began releasing a number of 12" singles. They included "Big Time" in May of that year through Breastfed Recordings., "The Great Smorgasbord" in December on Southern Fried Records, coinciding with "The Great Fashionista Swindle" through Pickadoll Records. The duo began performing live notably in Germany and the UK.

In May 2007, the duo released the 12" "Vote Yes", followed in October by "Fun, Fun, Fun", both through Prestel Records. The latter reached the Dutch and Belgian dance charts. In June "This Machine Kills Breakfasts" appeared through Alphabet City, while in December, they released "Sweeter Than Fever" through Pickadoll.

In May 2008, they released the 12" "Your Favourite Flu" through U-Boot, followed by "Cash In Drop Out" on Big & Dirty In June. In December 2008 the 12" "Rubber Band Boogie" again on Pickadoll.

=== Just Do The Dada (2009–2011) ===
In anticipation of their debut album, the duo released the single "Happy Hands & Happy Feet" through Big & Dirty in March 2009. It featured vocals by Anthony Mills and reached the Belgian charts. The duo released their first album Just Do The Dada in September 2009 through The:Hours. It featured vocal contributions by Anthony Mills, Bita Mazhoni and Anna Mourou. A second single from the album, "Let's Get Bleeped Tonight" was released in November and featured Bita Mazhoni. It also reached the Belgian charts. The third single from the album, " Love Vibrations" appeared in February 2010 and failed to chart. In May 2010 the 12" "Cookies With A Smile" appeared, featuring Anthony Mills on vocals.

Dada Life frequently headlines at North America's two largest electronic dance festivals, the Electric Daisy Carnival and Ultra Music Festival. At Electric Daisy Carnival 2011, Dada Life brought out a full marching band to perform their song "White Noise / Red Meat."

=== The Rules of Dada (2012–2016) ===
In October 2012, Dada Life released their second full-length album, The Rules of Dada, which reached the lower echelons of the Billboard 200 and the top 20 of the UK Dance album chart. It included the singles "Feed The Dada" and "Kick Out the Epic Motherfucker", which both charted in Sweden.

In fall 2012, Dada Life embarked on a tour of the same name, visiting over 40 cities in the US and Canada. In November 2013, the duo release "Born to Rage" that reached the chart in Belgium and Sweden.

In March 2014 Engblom was forced to abandon performing due to a medical emergency. In September 2014, Cornéer was diagnosed with cancer and took a temporary absence from performing. In 2015 he released the album One under the name Night Gestalt. He has since been declared cancer-free.

In December 2014, the duo engaged in a publicity stunt that allegedly concerned a lost MacBook Pro and a pair of headphones. Through social media accounts bearing the name Dada Death, a campaign for the single "Tonight We're Kids Again" was launched. In March 2015 they released the compilation mix Welcome To Dada Land.

The duo collaborated with vocalist Lzzy Hale of Halestorm in February 2016 for their single "Tic Tic Tic". In July 2016 they released "Red Is The Color Of Rage" that was described as "haunting and almost subdued", following it up with "Yellow Is The Color Of Happiness" soon after.

They cite John Cage, Little Richard, Acid House and Trance as inspiration.

=== Our Nation (2017–present) ===
In September 2017, Cornéer announced his intent to stop touring as part of Dada Life due to health concerns, but made it clear that his concerns had nothing to do with his 2014 cancer diagnosis. He continues to produce in-studio with Engblom.

In November 2017, Dada Life released "We Want Your Soul", the first single from their then-untitled third studio album. In March 2018, the second single, "Higher Than The Sun", was released, along with the title of the album - Our Nation - and the announcement of a tour to support it. The album was released on May 4, 2018. Another single, "Do It Till Your Face Hurts", was released in March as well.

== Collaborations ==
In 2007 they released the song "We Meow, You Roar" on a split 12" with Rob Mooney through Substance. They have remixed "Dynasty" and "Llove" by Kaskade (feat. Haley), "Big Bad Wolf" by Duck Sauce, "Who Is Ready To Jump" by Chuckie, and "Prutataaa" by Afrojack and R3hab.

== Name ==
Dada Life is named after the Dada art movement in 20th century Europe. The avant-garde art movement formed from an artistic anarchy, fighting against the cultural, political, and social values of the time. In the same way, Dada Life and rave culture as a whole is a protest to return to the experience of the body and away from the capitalistic and rationalist dogma of today's society.

== Notable acts ==
On October 26, 2013, Dada Life broke the Guinness World Record for the world's largest pillow fight at a Dada Land Compound event at the Aragon Ballroom in Chicago and had 3,813 participants.

On July 19, 2014, Dada Life debuted Dada Land: The Voyage, a mini-festival in San Bernardino, CA attended by over 10,000 fans where the duo arrived via hot air balloon.

On July 19, 2015, Dada Life broke the Guinness World Record for the world's largest gathering of people dressed as fruit at Dada Land: The Voyage. The event was at San Manuel Amphitheater in Southern California and had 629 participants.

== Discography ==
=== Albums ===
- 2009: Just Do the Dada
- 2012: The Rules of Dada
- 2018: Our Nation
- 2022: Blood, Sweat & Smiles

=== Compilation albums ===
- 2015: Welcome to Dada Land

=== 12" releases ===
- "Big Time" (May 2006, Breastfed Recordings)
- "The Great Smorgasbord" (December 2006, Southern Fried Records)
- "The Great Fashionista Swindle" (December 2006, Pickadoll Records)
- "Vote Yes" (May 2007, Prestel Records)
- "This Machine Kills Breakfasts" (June 2007, Alphabet City)
- "Sweeter Than Fever" (December 2007, Pickadoll)
- "Cookies with a Smile" (May 2010, Big & Dirty)

=== Singles ===
Year	Single	Label	Peak position				Certification	Album
Year	Single	Label	SWE	IRE	BEL (Vl)	POR	Certification	Album
2006	"Big Time"	Breastfed Recordings	—	—	—	—		Non-album singles
2006	"The Great Smorgasbord" / "We Do Have a Plan"	Southern Fried Records	—	—	—	—		Non-album singles
2006	"The Great Fashionista Swindle"	Pickadoll	—	—	—	—		Non-album singles
2007	"Vote Yes"	Prestel	—	—	—	—		Non-album singles
2007	"This Machine Kills Breakfasts" / "Do the Dada"	Alphabet City	—	—	—	—		Non-album singles
2007	"Fun Fun Fun"	Prestel	—	—	12	—		Non-album singles
2007	"Sweeter Than Fever"	Pickadoll	—	—	—	—		Non-album singles
2008	"Your Favourite Flu"	U-Boot	—	—	—	—		Non-album singles
2008	"Cash in Drop Out"	Big & Dirty	—	—	—	—		Non-album singles
2008	"Rubber Band Boogie"	Pickadoll	—	—	—	—		Non-album singles
2009	"Happy Hands & Happy Feet"	Big & Dirty	—	—	49	—		Just Do the Dada
2009	"Smile You're on Dada"	So Much Dada	—	—	—	—		Non-album single
2009	"Let's Get Bleeped Tonight"	Big & Dirty	—	—	69	—		Just Do the Dada
2010	"Love Vibrations"	Big & Dirty	—	—	—	—		Just Do the Dada
2010	"Cookies with a Smile"	Big & Dirty	—	—	—	—		Non-album singles
2010	"Just Bleep Me (Satisfaction)"	Bazooka Studio	—	—	—	—		Non-album singles
2010	"Tomorrow (Give in to the Night)" (with Dimitri Vegas & Like Mike and Tara McDonald)	Smash the House	—	—	16	48		Non-album singles
2010	"Unleash the F**king Dada"	Musical Freedom	—	—	64	—		Non-album singles
2011	"White Noise / Red Meat"	Dim Mak Records	—	—	—	—		Non-album singles
2011	"Fight Club Is Closed (It's Time for Rock'n'Roll)"	Spinnin' Records	—	—	—	—		Non-album singles
2011	"Happy Violence"	So Much Dada	—	—	—	—		The Rules of Dada
2011	"Kick Out the Epic Motherfucker"	So Much Dada	18	42	95	—	GLF: Platinum	The Rules of Dada
2012	"Rolling Stones T-Shirt"	So Much Dada	—	—	—	—		The Rules of Dada
2012	"Feed the Dada"	So Much Dada	32	—	103	—		The Rules of Dada
2013	"So Young So High"	So Much Dada	—	—	—	—		The Rules of Dada
2013	"Boing Clash Boom"	So Much Dada	—	—	—	—		The Rules of Dada
2013	"Born to Rage"	So Much Dada	—	—	—	—		Non-album singles
2013	"This Machine Kills Ravers"	So Much Dada	—	—	—	—		Non-album singles
2014	"Born to Rage" (featuring Sebastian Bach)	So Much Dada	53	—	94	—	GLF: Platinum	Non-album singles
2014	"One Smile"	So Much Dada	—	—	—	—		Non-album singles
2014	"Freaks Have More Fun"	So Much Dada	—	—	—	—		Non-album singles
2015	"Tonight We're Kids Again"	So Much Dada	—	—	—	—		Non-album singles
2015	"One Last Night on Earth"	So Much Dada	—	—	—	—	GLF: Gold	Non-album singles
2016	"Tic Tic Tic" (featuring Lzzy Hale)	So Much Dada	—	—	—	—		Non-album singles
2016	"Yellow Is the Color of Happiness" / "Red Is the Color of Rage"	So Much Dada	—	—	—	—		Non-album singles
2017	"We Want Your Soul"	So Much Dada	—	—	—	—		Our Nation
2018	"Love Vibrations" (with HI-LO)	Heldeep Records	—	—	—	—		Non-album singles
2018	"Higher Than the Sun"	—	—	—	—	—		Our Nation
2018	"Do It Till Your Face Hurts"	Revealed Recordings	—	—	—	—		Our Nation
2018	"One Nation Under Lasers"	Spinnin' Records	—	—	—	—		Our Nation
2018	"Sunday F**k You Too" (featuring Anthony Mills)	So Bleeped	—	—	—	—		Our Nation
2019	"No More 54"	Spinnin' Records	—	—	—	—		Non-album singles
2019	"Table Flipping Machine"	Revealed Recordings	—	—	—	—		Non-album singles
2020	"This Time (Never Be Alone Again)"	Revealed Recordings	—	—	—	—		Non-album singles
2021	"Love Is Coming Down"	Crash & Smile	—	—	—	—		Non-album singles
2021	"Noise Heaven"	Crash & Smile	—	—	—	—		Non-album singles
2021	"Electronic Circus Weapon"	Crash & Smile	—	—	—	—		Non-album singles
2022	"So Good"	Crash & Smile	—	—	—	—		Non-album singles
2022	"Happy Revolution"	Crash & Smile	—	—	—	—		Non-album singles
2022	"Readymade Sweat"	Crash & Smile	—	—	—	—		Non-album singles
2023	"Take Me Into Space" (with Dexter King)	Monstercat	—	—	—	—		Non-album singles
"—" denotes a recording that did not chart or was not released.
