= Salon du Chocolat =

Chocolate Industry Trade Fair

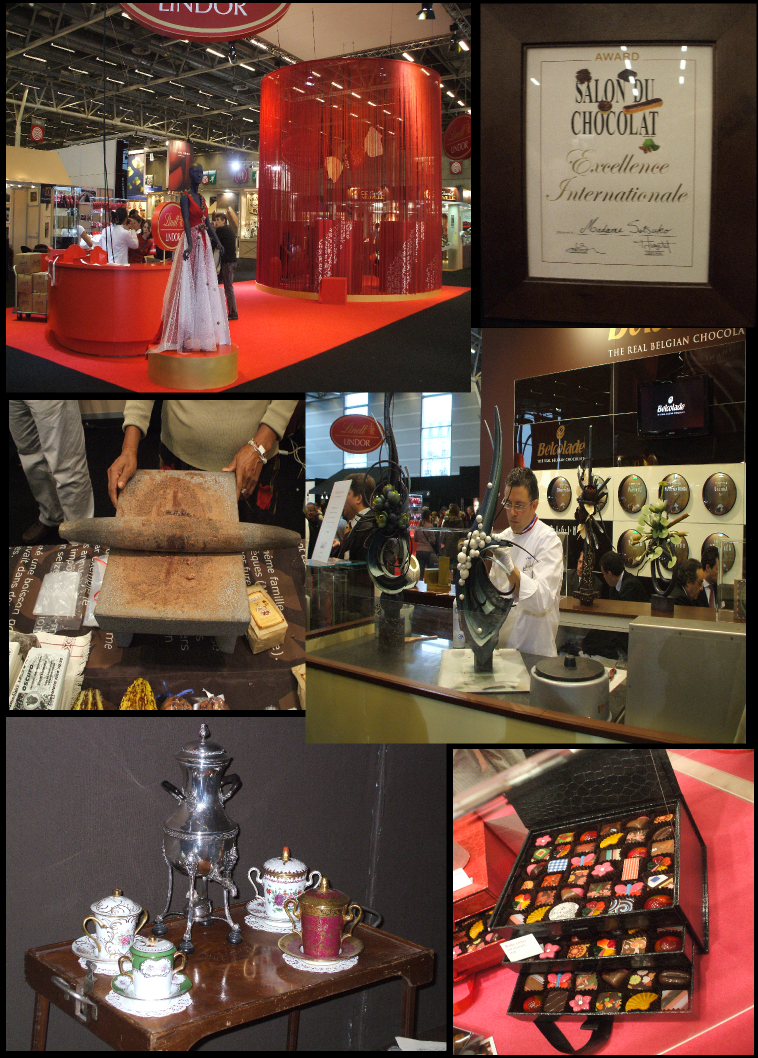
Salon du Chocolat 2008

The Salon du Chocolat (French pronunciation: [salɔ̃ dy ʃɔkɔla], lit. 'Salon of Chocolate', but more loosely translated Paris Chocolate Show) is a yearly trade fair for the international chocolate industry.

== History ==
Begun in 1994, the event is supported by the French Ministry of Foreign Affairs. It has previously been held in Paris, New York, Tokyo, and Moscow. It was held in Beijing in 2009 and Shanghai in 2010, reflecting the industry's interest in promoting China as a new consumer of chocolate.

The 2026 Paris edition, held at Paris Expo Porte de Versailles from 28 October to 1 November, hosted the second Ecuadorian Cacao Innovation Award, organized by Ecuador's export promotion office Pro Ecuador in partnership with the cacao supplier CocoaSupply.
