= 7 (David Guetta album) =

- Standard cover

Studio album by David Guetta
- Released: 14 September 2018
- Studio: Various (see recording locations)
- Genres: Dance; house; pop
- Length: 89:02
- Labels: What a Music; Parlophone; Warner France
- Producers: David Guetta; Giorgio Tuinfort; Stargate; Cirkut; Carl Falk; Lotus IV; J.R. Rotem; Phil Greiss; Timofey Reznikov; Martin Garrix; Brooks; Fred Rister; Red Triangle; Marcus van Wattum; Ralph Wegner

David Guetta chronology
Listen (2014)	7 (2018)

Alternative cover
- Cover for side two of the album which was independently released as the Jack Back Mixtape

Singles from 7
- 1. "2U" Released: 9 June 2017; 2. "Dirty Sexy Money" Released: 3 November 2017; 3. "Like I Do" Released: 22 February 2018; 4. "Flames" Released: 22 March 2018; 5. "Your Love" Released: 14 June 2018; 6. "Don't Leave Me Alone" Released: 27 July 2018; 7. "Goodbye" Released: 24 August 2018; 8. "Drive" Released: 24 August 2018; 9. "Say My Name" Released: 26 October 2018; 10. "Grenade" Released: 28 November 2018

7 is the seventh studio album by French DJ and record producer David Guetta, released on 14 September 2018 by What a Music, Parlophone and Big Beat Records. Released as a double album, the collection features commercial pop collaborations on the first disc, whilst disc two features underground house music akin to Guetta's roots as a DJ. The latter is credited to Jack Back, which Guetta revealed to be his alias and as a means to release more dance music alongside his pop collaborations. This side of the album is known as the Jack Back Project and was also released independently as a mixtape titled the Jack Back Mixtape, preceded by the release of the song "Overtone". 7 is David Guetta's first album since 2014's album Listen.

On 7, Guetta is reunited with frequent collaborators Sia, Bebe Rexha, Nicki Minaj and Martin Garrix, as well being joined by new collaborators Anne-Marie, Faouzia, Madison Beer, Charli XCX, French Montana, J Balvin, Jason Derulo, Willy William, Saweetie, Justin Bieber, Jess Glynne, Lil Uzi Vert, G-Eazy, Mally Mall, Delilah Montagu, Ava Max, CeCe Rogers and Stefflon Don who all contribute vocals to the album. Guetta worked with a range of different record producers and DJs on the album, notably including Brooks, Ralph Wegner, Albert Harvey (half of dance duo Glowinthedark), Giorgio Tuinfort and Norwegian production duo Stargate, amongst others. The album was preceded by the release of nine singles over 2017–2018, including "2U", "Dirty Sexy Money", "Like I Do", "Flames", "Your Love", "Don't Leave Me Alone", "Goodbye" and "Drive".

Upon release, the album garnered mixed reviews from critics who were torn between the predictability of Guetta's collaborations, with some praising the second side of the album as a return to his roots as an underground DJ. 7 was released on 28 September 2018 as a CD and vinyl. The album made several top-ten debuts including in Australia, Belgium, France, Italy and the UK and Ireland. In the US, the album opened at number 37 on the Billboard 200 albums chart although it did become Guetta's third Dance/Electronic Albums chart topper.

== Background and release ==
7 is a two-disc collection, with the first disc including Guetta's commercial pop collaborations. The second disc features a mixtape of underground house and dance music credited to Jack Back which was revealed to be an alias of Guetta's. The album's name has a special meaning to Guetta; elaborating on the theme and name of the album he said "it is my seventh album, but the number seven also represents the end of a cycle; a week is seven days, the creation of the world in the Bible is seven days and my birthday is on (Nov. 7). That number is kind of magic to me." In an interview with DJ Pete Tong, Guetta said the album represented a full cycle and return to his house roots. "I originally started in underground house music, playing all the raves and underground clubs in Paris. I wanted to make music just for fun, with absolutely no commercial approach to it. I want to make every type of music that I like, I'm doing it for the love of music."

"It represents a different side of me. Basically, I come from house music, and I wanted to go to my roots and just do something for fun. It's a double album, so the idea is not to compromise. The first album is completely pop, and the second album is completely underground. Instead of trying to do a little bit of everything on the same record I'm like, OK, let’s go hard! All the way pop and all the way electronic." — Guetta on his "double album" and alias 'Jack Back'.

Alongside the release of the album's official singles, a number of other songs were released throughout the recording of the album. On 27 March 2017, Guetta released "Light My Body Up" featuring frequent collaborator Nicki Minaj and Lil Wayne which reached the top twenty in Finland and France but only reaching number 64 in the UK. This was then followed on 28 April by the release of "Another Life", a collaborative release with Dutch DJ Afrojack and featuring vocals from singer songwriter Ester Dean. Then "Complicated" with Dimitri Vegas & Like Mike featuring Kiiara was released on 28 July.

On 3 November Guetta and Afrojack released "Dirty Sexy Money" featuring Charli XCX and French Montana. The following month, Guetta and Dutch DJ Martin Garrix released their collaboration "So Far Away" featuring Jamie Scott and Romy Dya. Guetta and Dutch EDM duo Showtek sampled the classic 90s dance song "Show Me Love" for their collaboration "Your Love", released in June 2018. These songs along with "Mad Love" with Sean Paul featuring Becky G are included on some of the international releases of the album.

== Promotion ==
Guetta performed at Meyer Werft (Papenburg, Germany) for the official naming of AIDA Cruises' newest cruiser line, the AIDAnova. on 31 August 2018. On 1 September 2018, Guetta headlined the first day of the 2018 Fusion Festival, which took place at Otterspool Promenade in Liverpool, UK.

On 9 September, Guetta released a mixtape of the second side of the album as a DJ Mix. The Jack Back Mixtape contains the 12 songs released under his alias 'Jack Back'. Additionally in the run up to 14 September, Guetta released a series of teaser videos via his official instagram, each video features music from the album and together, the screencaps of the videos make up the album cover.

== Singles ==
"2U" featuring Justin Bieber was released as the album's first single on 7 June 2017. The song charted highly worldwide. This was followed up by "Dirty Sexy Money", with Afrojack and featuring vocals from Charli XCX and French Montana. Guetta described the collaboration as the type of song "he'd always wanted to make".

"Like I Do" was jointly released with Martin Garrix and Brooks on 22 February 2018. This is followed by the singles "Flames", with Sia, on 22 March, and "Don't Leave Me Alone", featuring Anne-Marie, on 27 July. The EDM track "Overtone" was released as a single from the Jack Back Mixtape via Beatport on 20 August 2018.

On 24 August 2018, Guetta simultaneously released two further singles from the album, "Goodbye" with Jason Derulo (featuring Nicki Minaj and Willy William) and "Drive", a collaboration with South African DJ Black Coffee and featuring vocals from Delilah Montagu. Both songs debuted on the US Billboard Dance/Electronic Songs at numbers 12 and 31 respectively, making Guetta the artist with the most entries on the chart since its creation, bringing his total to 34.

"Say My Name" with Bebe Rexha and J Balvin was released as the album's eighth single on 26 October 2018. The song reached top ten in several countries and reached the top twenty in France, at number 12.

== Critical reception ==
Professional ratings
Review scores
Source	Rating
AllMusic	4/5 stars
The Financial Times	3/5 stars
Rolling Stone	2/5 stars
The Times	3/5 stars

7 received mixed reviews from music critics. When describing the music releases of the week, MTV described the album as "huge" and "filled with features and bops that will keep you dancing 'till 2019." In writing for Rolling Stone, Elias Leight said that the first half of the album was familiar territory for Guetta, "stuffed to bursting with the type of cross-genre collaborations that made Guetta a global star". He also remarked that Guetta's album was in keeping with current trends by including Afro-house (his Black Coffee collaboration) and reggaeton with two songs featuring J Balvin. He rounded off his review by saying that Guetta missed the trick by revealing he was being the alias 'Jack Back', "it would have been bolder, of course, if Guetta had dropped an album under a fake name and kept his identity secret. But there's no point in being bold when there’s money to be made by hedging bets". The Times' Will Hodgkinson described the album as "Guetta having his cake and eating it,". According to Hodgkinson, "disc one features cheesy pop; disc two showcases his credible roots as a house and techno DJ." He also criticised the commercial collaborations as "formulaic hit fodder" for "drowning in a sea of Auto-tune".

In a more positive review AllMusic's Neil Z. Yeung gave the album 4 out of 5 starts saying that Guetta "entered a free-spirited, late-era comfort zone, making music for the fun of it instead of chasing another radio smash," and comparing disc one to a "festival headlining set, building nicely before an unrelenting middle stretch that winds down the euphoria at the close." Yeung also described the album as "celebratory", and finished his review by saying "Not since One Love (2009) has Guetta sounded as uplifted or invested. 7 is a pure joy to experience and a reminder that Guetta is still a master of the genre."

== Commercial performance ==
7 debuted at number 37 on the US Billboard 200 with 15,000 album-equivalent units, which included 3,000 pure album sales. It serves as David Guetta's third number-one on the US Dance/Electronic Albums.

== Track listing ==
Guetta is credited for writing and producing all of the songs on the standard and limited editions of the album. Additional credits are provided below.

7 – disc one
No.	Title	Writer(s)	Producer(s)	Length
1.	"Don't Leave Me Alone" (featuring Anne-Marie)	David Guetta; Noonie Bao; Linus Wiklund; Sarah Aarons	Lotus IV; Albert Harvey^{[a]}; Timofey Reznikov^{[a]}	3:04
2.	"Battle" (featuring Faouzia)	Faouzia; Danny Shah; George Tizzard; Rick Parkhouse; Boris "Netsky" Daenen; Tor Erik Hermansen; Mikkel Eriksen; Carl Falk	Red Triangle; Stargate; Netsky; Peter Carlsson^{[b]}; Falk^{[b]}; Chris "TEK" O'Ryan^{[b]}; Aton Ben-Horin^{[b]}	2:44
3.	"Flames" (with Sia)	Sia Furler; Chris Braide; Giorgio Tuinfort; Marcus van Wattum	Tuinfort; Wattum^{[a]}; Braide^{[b]}	3:15
4.	"Blame It On Love" (featuring Madison Beer)	Allison Kaplan; James Alan Ghaleb; Marc Sibley; Nathan Cunningham; Hermansen; Eriksen; Harvey	Stargate; Albert Harvey; Falk; Brooks^{[a]}; Tuinfort^{[a]}; Gian Stone^{[d]}	3:27
5.	"Say My Name" (with Bebe Rexha and J Balvin)	Tuinfort; Boaz van de Beatz; José Balvin; Alejandro Ramirez; Thomas Troelsen; Emily Warren; Britt Burton; Philip Leigh; Matt Holmes	Tuinfort; van de Beatz; Mitch Allan^{[a]}	3:19
6.	"Goodbye" (with Jason Derulo featuring Nicki Minaj and Willy William)	Philippe Greiss; Willy William; David Saint Fleur; Art Beatz; Curtis Gray; Jean-Michel Sissoko; DJ Paulito; Jazelle Rodriguez; Christopher Tempest; Kinda Ingrosso; Nicki Minaj; Jason Derulo; Francesco Sartori; Lucio Quarantotto; Franck Peterson	Greiss; Fleur; Vodka	3:15
7.	"I'm That Bitch" (featuring Saweetie)	Diamonté Harper; Hermansen; Eriksen; Harvey	Stargate; Harvey; van de Beatz^{[a]}	3:15
8.	"Like I Do" (with Martin Garrix and Brooks)	Sean Douglas; Martijn Garritsen; Tuinfort; Thijs "Brooks" Westbroek; Talay Riley; Nick Seeley; Robert Bergin	Martin Garrix; Tuinfort; Brooks	3:22
9.	"2U" (featuring Justin Bieber)	Tuinfort; Jason "Poo Bear" Boyd; Daniel "Cesqeaux" Tuparia; Bieber	Tuinfort; Cesqeaux^{[a]}; Poo Bear^{[b]}	3:15
10.	"She Knows How to Love Me" (featuring Jess Glynne and Stefflon Don)	Tuinfort; Rakim Allen; Stefflon Don; J.R. Rotem; Ralph Wegner; Teal Douville; Richard Penniman; Dorothy La Bostrie; Joe Lubin	Tuinfort; Rotem; Wegner; Douville^{[c]}	3:02
11.	"Motto" (with Steve Aoki featuring Lil Uzi Vert, G-Eazy and Mally Mall)	Steve Aoki; Hermansen; Eriksen; Harvey; Mally Mall; Gerald Gillum; Symere Woods	Aoki; Mally Mall; Stargate; Harvey	2:30
12.	"Drive" (with Black Coffee featuring Delilah Montagu)	Wegner; Ilsey Juber; Hermansen; Eriksen; Phillip "TxTHEWAY" Fender; Black Coffee	Black Coffee; Wegner; Stargate	3:06
13.	"Para Que Te Quedes" (featuring J Balvin)	Tuinfort; Falk; Harvey; Tuparia; van de Beatz; Balvin	Tuinfort; Falk; Harvey; Cesqeaux^{[a]}	2:58
14.	"Let It Be Me" (featuring Ava Max)	Joren van der Voort; Michael Aljadeff; Henry "Cirkut" Walter; Amanda Koçi; Suzanne Vega	Cirkut	2:53
15.	"Light Headed" (with Sia)	Furler; Braide; Hermansen; Eriksen; Daenen	Netsky; Stargate; Braide^{[a]}	2:59
Total length:				46:24

7 – limited edition bonus tracks
No.	Title	Writer(s)	Producer(s)	Length
16.	"Mad Love" (with Sean Paul featuring Becky G)	Sean Paul Henriques; Tuinfort; Schwartz; Shakira Ripoll; Jack Patterson; Rosina Russell; Ina Wroldsen; Raoul Chen	Tuinfort; Patterson; Jason Henriques; Banx & Ranx; 1st Klase	3:19
17.	"Dirty Sexy Money" (with Afrojack featuring Charli XCX and French Montana)	van de Wall; Charlotte Aitchison; Alexander Guy Cook; Parmenius; Karim Kharbouch	Afrojack; Skrillex^{[a]}	2:52
18.	"So Far Away" (with Martin Garrix featuring Jamie Scott and Romy Dya)	Martijn Garritsen; Tuinfort; Jamie Scott; Jason Boyd	Garrix; Tuinfort	3:03
19.	"Your Love" (with Showtek)	Wouter Janssen; Sjoerd Janssen; Jaap Reesema; van der Voort; Allen George; Fred McFarlane	Showtek; Wegner	3:05
Total length:				12:19

Disc two – David Guetta presents Jack Back Project (also released independently as Jack Back Mixtape)
No.	Title	Writer(s)	Producer(s)	Length
1.	"Reach for Me"	Jack Hisbach; Reznikov; Oscar Gaeton; Ralph Falcon	Guetta; Reznikov	3:47
2.	"Freedom" (by David Guetta & CeCe Rogers)	Hisbach; Reznikov; Kenneth J Rogers III (CeCe Rogers)	Guetta; Reznikov	3:55
3.	"Grenade"	Hisbach; Wegner; Adam Freeland; Damien Taylor	Guetta; Wegner	3:32
4.	"Inferno"	Hisbach; Wegner	Guetta; Wegner	3:09
5.	"Overtone"	Hisbach; Reznikov; Andrei Mangush	Guetta; Reznikov	3:36
6.	"Back and Forth"	Hisbach; Wegner; Reznikov; Harvey	Guetta; Reznikov; Glowinthedark	3:25
7.	"Pelican"	Hisbach; Tuinfort; Frederic "Fred Rister" Riesterer; Wegner	Guetta; Fred Rister; Wegner	3:26
8.	"Afterglow"	Hisbach; Wegner	Guetta; Wegner	3:26
9.	"Think Think Think"	Hisbach; Wegner; Riesterer	Guetta; Fred Rister; Wegner	3:41
10.	"Orion"	Hisbach; Wegner	Guetta; Wegner	3:52
11.	"What 2 Say"	Hisbach; Harvey	Guetta; Glowinthedark	3:36
12.	"Just a Little More Love" (Jack Back 2018 Remix; by David Guetta featuring Chris Willis)	Guetta; Joachim Garraud; Chris Willis; Jean Charles Carré	Guetta (and remixer); Garraud	3:24
Total length:				42:49

Notes

- ^{^[a]} signifies an additional producer
- ^{^[b]} signifies a vocal producer
- ^{^[c]} signifies a co-producer
- ^{^[d]} signifies an additional vocal producer

Sample credits

- "Goodbye" contains elements from "Time to Say Goodbye" as written by Francesco Sartori, Lucio Quarantotto and Franck Peterson
- "She Knows How to Love Me" contains elements from "Tutti Frutti" as written by Richard Penniman, Dorothy La Bostrie and Joe Lubin
- "Let It Be Me" contains elements of "Tom's Diner" as written by Suzanne Vega.
- "Reach for Me" contains elements from "Reach For Me" as written by Oscar Gaetan and Ralph Falcon
- "Freedom" contains elements from "All Join Hands" as written by CeCe Rogers
- "Grenade" contains elements from "We Want Your Soul" as written by Adam Freeland and Damian Taylor
- "Overtone" contains elements of "Altai Sayan Tandy-Uula" as written by Andrei Mangush

== Credits and personnel ==
Credits adapted from Guetta's website and album booklet.

=== Recording locations ===
- Poundcake Studios (Rotterdam, Netherlands)
- Future History Studios (Los Angeles, California)
- Glenwood Place Studios (Burbank, California)
- Studio Urbain (Paris, France)
- Piano Music Studio (Amsterdam, Netherlands)
- Can Rocas Studio (Ibiza, Balearic Islands)
- Conway Recording Studios (Hollywood, California)
- Jay Sound Studio (Hilversum, Netherlands)
- Tribe Studios (Naples, Italy); mastering only
- DMI Studios (Las Vegas, Nevada); mastering only
- Sine Music Studios (Villingen-Schwenningen, Germany)
- De Muziekfabriek (Kruisland, Netherlands; mastering only

=== Featured artists and vocalists ===
- Allison Kaplan – background vocals
- Anne-Marie – featured artist, vocals
- Ava Max – featured artist, vocals
- Bebe Rexha – featured artist, vocals
- Chris Willis – featured artist, vocals
- CeCe Rogers – co-lead artist
- David Guetta (also credited as Jack Back) – lead artist, instrumentation, producer, programming
- Delilah Montagu – featured artist, vocals
- Faouzia – featured artist, vocals
- Francesca Richard – background vocals
- G-Eazy – featured artist, vocals
- J Balvin – featured artist, vocals
- Jason DeRulo – co-lead artist, vocals
- Jess Glynne – featured artist, vocals
- Justin Bieber – featured artist, vocals
- Lil Uzi Vert – featured artist, vocals
- Madison Beer – featured artist, vocals
- Mally Mall – featured artist, vocals, producer
- Nicki Minaj – featured artist, vocals
- Noonie Bao – background vocals
- Sarah Aarons – background vocals
- Saweetie – featured artist, vocals
- Sia – featured artist, vocals
- Stefflon Don – featured artist, vocals
- Talay Riley – background vocals
- Willy William – featured artist, vocals

=== Musicians and technicians ===
- Albert Harvey (Glowinthedark) – additional production, instrumentation, producer, programming
- Black Coffee – producer
- Boaz Van De Beatz – additional production, producer
- Brooks – instrumentation, mastering, mixing, producer, programming
- Carl Falk – producer, vocal producer
- Chris "Tek" O'Ryan – vocal engineer, vocoder
- Chris Braide – producer, vocal producer
- Cirkut – producer
- Daddy's Groove – mastering, mixing
- Daniel "Cesqeaux" Tuparia – additional production, programming
- David Saint Fleur – producer
- Fred Rister – instrumentation, producer, programming
- Giorgio Tuinfort – instrumentation, piano, producer, programming
- Jack Hisbach – instrumentation, producer, programming
- Jason Boyd – vocal producer
- John Hanes – engineer
- Jonathan Rotem – producer
- Josh Gudwin – vocal engineer
- Lotus IV – instrumentation, producer, programming
- Louis Henry Sarmiento II – engineer
- Marcus Van Wattum – additional production, composer
- Martin Garrix – instrumentation, producer, programming
- Mitch Allan – vocal producer
- Monsieur Georges – talk box
- Netsky – producer
- Nick Seeley – keyboards
- Phil Greiss – producer
- Pianoman – talk box
- Pierre-Luc Rioux – guitar
- Priscilla Renea – vocal producer
- Ralph Wegner – additional production, instrumentation, producer, programming
- Red Triangle – producer
- Serban Ghenea – mixing
- Stargate – producer
- Steve Aoki – producer
- Teal Douville – producer
- Timofey Reznikov – additional production, instrumentation, mixing, producer, programming
- Vodka – producer

=== Artwork ===
- Ellen von Unwerth – photography
- Youbold – graphic design

== Charts ==
=== Weekly charts ===
Weekly chart performance for 7
Chart (2018)	Peak position
Australian Albums (ARIA)	9
Austrian Albums (Ö3 Austria)	7
Belgian Albums (Ultratop Flanders)	9
Belgian Albums (Ultratop Wallonia)	5
Canadian Albums (Billboard)	12
Czech Albums (ČNS IFPI)	4
Danish Albums (Hitlisten)	13
Dutch Albums (Album Top 100)	9
Finnish Albums (Suomen virallinen lista)	8
French Albums (SNEP)	4
German Albums (Offizielle Top 100)	7
Hungarian Albums (MAHASZ)	14
Irish Albums (Official Charts)	9
Italian Albums (FIMI)	8
Japan Hot Albums (Billboard Japan)	23
Japanese Albums (Oricon)	56
Norwegian Albums (VG-lista)	10
Portuguese Albums (AFP)	24
Scottish Albums (Official Charts)	17
Slovak Albums (ČNS IFPI)	3
Spanish Albums (Promusicae)	3
Swedish Albums (Sverigetopplistan)	13
Swiss Albums (Schweizer Hitparade)	2
UK Albums (Official Charts)	9
UK Dance Albums (Official Charts)	2
US Billboard 200	37
US Top Dance Albums (Billboard)	1

=== Year-end charts ===
Annual chart performance for 7
Chart (2018)	Position
Belgian Albums (Ultratop Flanders)	191
Belgian Albums (Ultratop Wallonia)	92
French Albums (SNEP)	85
US Top Dance/Electronic Albums (Billboard)	23
Chart (2019)	Position
Belgian Albums (Ultratop Flanders)	175
French Albums (SNEP)	100

== Certifications ==
Certifications for 7
Region	Certification	Certified units/sales
Canada (Music Canada)	Gold	40,000^{‡}
Denmark (IFPI Danmark)	Gold	10,000^{‡}
France (SNEP)	Platinum	100,000^{‡}
Italy (FIMI)	Gold	25,000^{‡}
Norway (IFPI Norway)	2× Platinum	40,000^{‡}
Poland (ZPAV)	Gold	10,000^{‡}
Singapore (RIAS)	Gold	5,000^{*}
United Kingdom (BPI)	Gold	100,000^{‡}
United States (RIAA)	Gold	500,000^{‡}
^{*} Sales figures based on certification alone.^{‡} Sales+streaming figures based on certification alone.

== Release history ==
Release history of 7
Region	Date	Format(s)	Label
United States	9 September 2018	Jack Back Mixtape – streaming	What a Music; Parlophone; Warner Music
Various	14 September 2018	Streaming; digital download; CD; vinyl	What a Music; Parlophone; Warner Music
United States	28 September 2018	CD; vinyl	What a Music; Parlophone; Warner Music
Japan	10 October 2018	CD	Warner Music Japan
