= Better When You're Gone =

Single by David Guetta, Brooks & Loote
- Released: 8 February 2019
- Recorded: 2018
- Genre: Future bounce
- Length: 3:12
- Label: What a Music
- Songwriters: David Guetta; Ido Zmishlany; Thijs Westbroek; Jackson Foote; Emma Lov Block; Jeremy Dussolliet
- Producers: David Guetta; Brooks

David Guetta singles chronology
"Say My Name" (2018)	"Better When You're Gone" (2019)	"Ring the Alarm" (2019)

Brooks singles chronology
"Limbo" (2018)	"Better When You're Gone" (2019)	"Waiting for Love" (2019)

Loote singles chronology
"Back Together" (2018)	"Better When You're Gone" (2019)	"85%" (2019)

"Better When You're Gone" is a song by French DJ David Guetta, Dutch DJ Brooks, and American pop duo Loote. It was released as a single on 8 February 2019 by What a Music. The song was written by the artists alongside Ido Zmishlany and Jeremy Dussoliet.

== Background ==
On 31 January 2019, Guetta posted a teaser for the song on his Twitter account. The song is the second collaboration between Guetta and Brooks, after the song "Like I Do" in 2018. Brooks also released a remix of Guetta's track "Sun Goes Down" in 2015.

== Track listing ==
Digital download
No.	Title	Length
1.	"Better When You're Gone"	3:12

== Charts ==
=== Weekly charts ===
Chart (2019)	Peak position
Austria (Ö3 Austria Top 40)	70
Belgium (Ultratip Bubbling Under Flanders)	24
Belgium (Ultratip Bubbling Under Wallonia)	8
France (SNEP)	150
Germany (GfK)	59
Hungary (Dance Top 40)	27
Norway (VG-lista)	18
Sweden (Sverigetopplistan)	49
Switzerland (Schweizer Hitparade)	51
US Hot Dance/Electronic Songs (Billboard)	25

=== Year-end charts ===
Chart (2019)	Position
Hungary (Dance Top 40)	100
US Hot Dance/Electronic Songs (Billboard)	82
