= Mike Williams (DJ) =

Dutch DJ and record producer

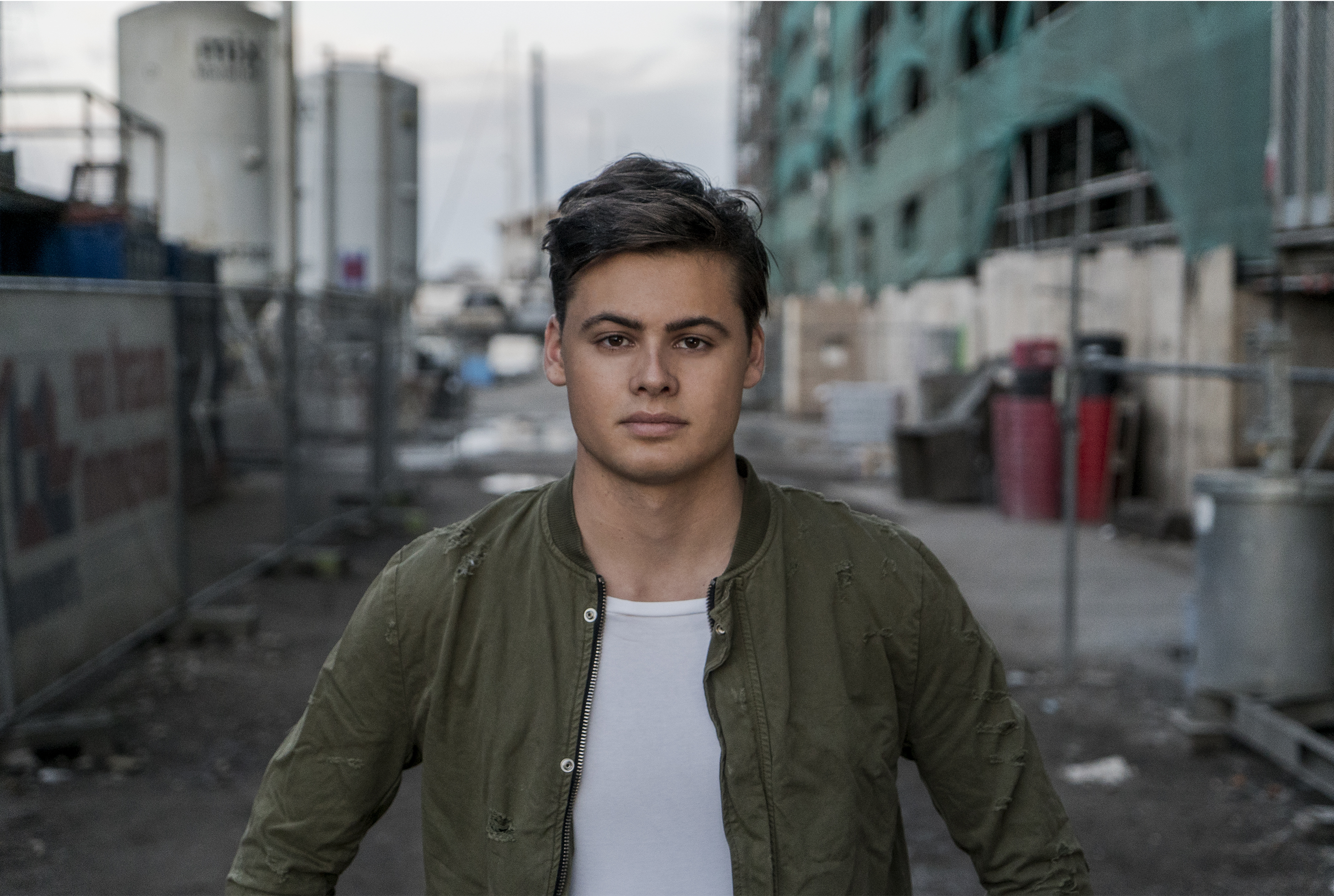
- Williams in 2016

Background information
- Also known as: WLLMS
- Born: Mike Willemsen; November 27, 1996 (age 29); Hilversum, North Holland, Netherlands
- Origin: Kortenhoef, North Holland, Netherlands
- Genres: Electro house; future bass; future house; future bounce
- Occupations: Musician; DJ; record producer; remixer; chef
- Instruments: Logic Pro; piano; keyboards
- Years active: 2008–present
- Labels: Spinnin' Records; Musical Freedom; Revealed Recordings; Dharma Worldwide; Protocol Recordings; LYD; Future House Music; Universal Music Group
- Website: mikewilliams.nl
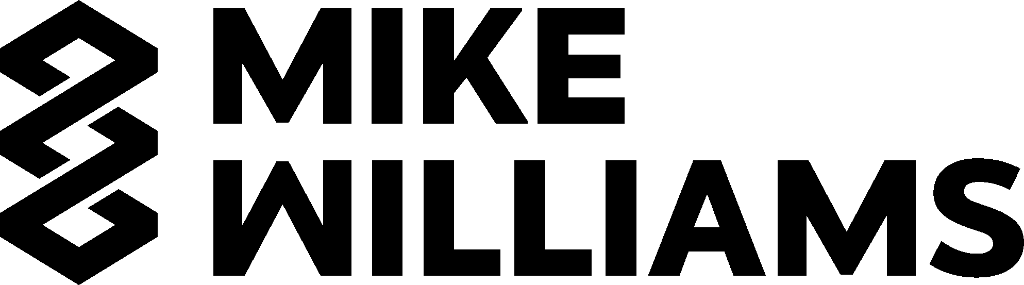

Mike Willemsen (Dutch pronunciation: [ˈmɑik ˈʋɪləmsə(n)]; born November 27, 1996), better known by his stage name Mike Williams, is a Dutch DJ, record producer, musician, remixer and chef. He is best known for working with Tiësto and as an artist of Spinnin' Records, who recognized him as an "artist of the future". He is regarded as one of the pioneers of the future bounce genre, an emerging subgenre of future house, alongside fellow Dutch DJs Brooks, Mesto, among others.

== Biography ==
=== Early life ===
Mike Willemsen was born in Hilversum, North Holland, on November 27, 1996. He has an older sister, Michelle, a reporter for De Telegraaf. He started playing the piano as a child at the age of 6. When he grew a little older, he learned sight-reading during his piano lessons but would rather devise, make and play his own songs. Afterwards, he quit his lessons and started working on a laptop with an amplifier and his father's speakers. At the age of 12, he learned to DJ and produced his first dance track. At 14, he performed as a DJ in a club for 500 people, and after that was regularly booked for gigs.

=== Music career ===
At the beginning of his career, Williams released numerous remixes and bootlegs of songs such as "Blame" by Calvin Harris and "I Really Like You" by Carly Rae Jepsen, which received over 3 million plays on SoundCloud. The remix of "Blame" was well received and was regularly played by other DJs such as Oliver Heldens at their sets. Later on, he started releasing his own songs, as well as collaborations with other artists and his first single was "Konnichiwa", which was released on January 31, 2015. On June 6, 2015, he released "Candy", a collaboration with Dastic (Damian Bast). Williams' single "Battlefield" under the alias WLLMS with Robby East was released on June 26, 2015. Since then, he was approached by labels and managements before signing with Spinnin' Records. He was signed by Tiësto, who later on also released a single with him, and was managed by MusicAllStars.

==== 2016: Sweet & Sour ====
On February 29, 2016, he released "Sweet & Sour", his first single through Tiësto's label Musical Freedom. The single peaked at number 6 on the Beatport Top 100 chart. An official music video for the song was released. On March 8, 2016, he was a guest and performed at Bij Igmar on SLAM!. During the Ultra Music Festival in 2016, Tiësto introduced Williams to the crowd and invited him to perform on his set. On May 16, 2016, Williams released "Groovy George", a collaboration with Justin Mylo through Musical Freedom. An official music video for the song was released. That same month, the two were guests and had performed at Bij Igmar on SLAM!. On August 5, 2016, together with Tiësto, he released "I Want You" through Musical Freedom as a free download. The single received over 16 million plays as of March 2017. That same month, he performed at the 2016 Mysteryland festival. In September, Williams remixed "Feel the Love", a single by Janieck, officially released on September 26. On October 17, 2016, he released "Take Me Down", his first single through Spinnin' Records. That same month, he performed at the Amsterdam Dance Event for the first time. His remix of "Money Maker" by Throttle featuring LunchMoney Lewis and Aston Merrygold came out on November 7, 2016.

==== 2017: Mike Williams on Track ====
On January 5, 2017, he started his own radio show titled "Mike Williams on Track", which is a part of the weekend schedule of Dutch radio station SLAM!. Four days later, he returned to Musical Freedom and released "Bambini", his first single of the year. On March 3, 2017, he released the single "Another Night" featuring Matluck on Spinnin' Records. An official music video for the song was also released. An acoustic version was released four weeks and five days later. On March 13, 2017, Williams announced on social media that his laptop had been stolen on a Sunday night. While he was sleeping, a thief broke into his home in Amsterdam. He then woke up, but it was too late and he saw the thief running away with his laptop. The laptop had valuable data for him as a producer, prompting Williams to offer a $2000 reward to whoever helps him to get it back. He then performed at the Spinnin' Hotel in Miami. On April 27, 2017, he performed at AFAS Stadion in Alkmaar during SLAM! Koningsdag 2017. On May 8, 2017, he released the single "Don't Hurt" on Spinnin' Records, which featured Brēzy. An official music video for the song was also released. That same month, he was a guest again and performed at Bij Igmar on SLAM!. Shortly afterwards, Williams released an official remix for "Hunter", a single by Galantis. Together with Curbi, Mesto and Sophie Francis, he also organized benefit concerts for a school in Limburg. In July, Williams and Curbi collaborated with Lucas & Steve for the single "Let's Go". The four had then hosted an episode on the Spinnin' Records radio show Spinnin' Sessions. On August 4, 2017, he and Felix Jaehn released the collaborative single "Feel Good", which reached the top 50 on the Apple Music dance charts and spent a couple of weeks on the A-list dance playlist on Apple Music. A week later, he released "Step Up", a collaboration with Tom & Jame on the sub-label Spinnin' Copyright Free Music as a free download. On September 4, 2017, he released a single with Brooks, titled "Jetlag". A month later, he returned to Music Freedom and released the single "Melody (Tip of My Tongue)". He also attended the Amsterdam Dance Event for the second time in Amsterdam. In the 2017 DJ Mag Top 100, Williams was voted in at number 60.

==== 2018: Lullaby ====
Williams' collaborative track with R3hab, "Lullaby", has 200 million streams on Spotify as of December 16, 2022, and has achieved eight gold and four platinum certifications worldwide. It also reached the top 10 in Norway and charted in Sweden, as well as appeared on the US Billboard Hot Dance/Electronic Songs chart. He released the single "Give It Up" in May. An official music video for "Give It Up" was also released. In July, he performed at the 2018 edition of the Tomorrowland festival in Belgium. That same month, he released a single titled "The Beat". In October, he attended the Amsterdam Dance Event in Amsterdam. In the 2018 DJ Mag Top 100, he was voted in at number 66. His final single of 2018, "Wait Another Day", was a collaboration with Mesto and released in December through Spinnin' Records. The single gained significant radio play on Radio 538 in the Netherlands, among other stations.

==== 2022: Storylines ====
After his hiatus in 2021, Williams returned with his new album Storylines. He started 2022 with his new songs, "Pretty Little Words" with Zack Hall, "Here for You" with Magnificence, "Ambush" with Robbie Mendez, "Supernova" with Retrovision, "Best Part Missing", and "When the Sun Is Gone" with RYVM.

==== 2025: Mike Williams on Track ====
Starting at episode 415, the first episode of 2025, the radio show "Mike Williams on Track" was changed to a monthly basis.

== Discography ==
=== Charting singles ===
Year	Title	Peak chart positions								Album
Year	Title	NLD	AUT	BEL (Fl)	BEL (Wa)	GER	NOR	SWE	US Dance	Album
2017	"Bambini"	—	—	—	—^{[A]}	—	—	—	—	Non-album singles
2017	"Let's Go" (with Lucas & Steve and Curbi)	—	—	—^{[B]}	—	—	—	—	—	Non-album singles
2017	"Feel Good" (with Felix Jaehn)	—	66	—^{[C]}	—	72	—	—	—	Non-album singles
2018	"Lullaby" (with R3hab)	—^{[D]}	—	—	—	—	7	66	—	Non-album singles
2018	"Give It Up"	—	—	—^{[E]}	—	—	—	—	—	Non-album singles
2018	"Wait Another Day" (with Mesto)	—^{[F]}	—	—^{[G]}	—^{[H]}	—	—	—	—	Non-album singles
2019	"Wait for You" (featuring Maia Wright)	—	—	—^{[I]}	—	—	—	—	—	Non-album singles
2019	"Day or Night"	—	—	—	—^{[J]}	—	—	—	—	Non-album singles
2020	"Make You Mine" (featuring Moa Lisa)	—	—	—^{[K]}	—^{[L]}	—	—	—	—	Non-album singles
"—" denotes a recording that did not chart or was not released in that territory.

=== Albums ===
List of studio albums
Title	Details
Storylines	Released: October 21, 2022; Label: Spinnin' Records; Formats: Digital download

=== EPs ===
Title	Details
Storylines - EP	Released: December 23, 2022; Label: Spinnin' Records; Formats: Digital download

=== Singles ===
Year	Title	Alias	Collaboration with	Record label
2015	Konnichiwa	Mike Williams	—	Mike Williams Media
2015	Konnichiwa	Mike Williams	—	Future House Music (FHM)
2015	Candy	Mike Williams	Dastic	Musical Sweets
2015	Battlefield	WLLMS	Robby East	LYD (Future House Music)
2016	Sweet & Sour	Mike Williams	—	Musical Freedom (Spinnin' Records)
2016	Groovy George	Mike Williams	Justin Mylo	Musical Freedom (Spinnin' Records)
2016	I Want You	Mike Williams	Tiësto	Musical Freedom (Spinnin' Records)
2016	Take Me Down	Mike Williams	—	Spinnin' Records
2017	Bambini	Mike Williams	—	Musical Freedom (Spinnin' Records)
2017	Another Night	Mike Williams	Matluck	Spinnin' Records
2017	Don't Hurt	Mike Williams	Brēzy	Spinnin' Records
2017	Let's Go	Mike Williams	Lucas & Steve	Spinnin' Records
2017	Let's Go	Mike Williams	Curbi	Spinnin' Records
2017	Feel Good	Mike Williams	Felix Jaehn	Spinnin' Records
2017	Step Up	Mike Williams	Tom & Jame	Spinnin' Copyright Free Music (Spinnin' Records)
2017	Jetlag	Mike Williams	Brooks	Spinnin' Records
2017	Melody (Tip of My Tongue)	Mike Williams	—	Musical Freedom (Spinnin' Records)
2017	You & I	Mike Williams	Dastic	Spinnin' Records
2018	Lullaby	Mike Williams	R3hab	CYB3RPVNK
2018	Feels Like Yesterday	Mike Williams	Robin Valo	Spinnin' Records
2018	Give It Up	Mike Williams	—	Spinnin' Records
2018	The Beat	Mike Williams	—	Spinnin' Records
2018	Rocket	Mike Williams	—	Dharma Worldwide (Spinnin' Records)
2018	Wait Another Day	Mike Williams	Mesto	Spinnin' Records
2019	I Got You	Mike Williams	—	Spinnin' Records
2019	I'm Not Sorry	Mike Williams	Hardwell	Revealed Recordings
2019	Wait for You	Mike Williams	Maia Wright	Spinnin' Records
2019	Kylie	Mike Williams	Dastic	Spinnin' Records
2019	Day or Night	Mike Williams	—	Musical Freedom (Spinnin' Records)
2019	Dynamite	Mike Williams	Nicky Romero	Protocol Recordings
2019	Dynamite	Mike Williams	Amba Shepherd	Protocol Recordings
2020	Make You Mine	Mike Williams	Moa Lisa	Spinnin' Records
2020	Take Me There	Mike Williams	Curbi	Spinnin' Records
2020	Fallin' In	Mike Williams	—	Universal Music Group
2020	You're the Future	Mike Williams	SWACQ	Spinnin' Records
2020	Face Up to the Sun	Mike Williams	Justin Mylo	Universal Music
2020	Face Up to the Sun	Mike Williams	Sara Sangfelt	Universal Music
2021	I Hope You Know	Mike Williams	Jonas Aden	Universal Music
2021	Get Dirty	Mike Williams	—	Musical Freedom (Spinnin' Records)
2021	Without You	Mike Williams	Felix Jaehn	Universal Music
2021	Without You	Mike Williams	Jordan Shaw	Universal Music
2021	Air	Mike Williams	—	Spinnin' Records
2021	Harmony	Mike Williams	Xillions	Spinnin' Records
2022	Pretty Little Words	Mike Williams	Zack Hall	Spinnin' Records
2022	Here For You	Mike Williams	Magnificence	Musical Freedom (Spinnin' Records)
2022	I Said Too Much	Mike Williams	—	Smash the House
2022	Closing Time	Mike Williams	Matluck	Spinnin' Records
2022	Best Part Missing	Mike Williams	—	Spinnin' Records
2022	Supernova	Mike Williams	RetroVision	Spinnin' Records
2022	Ambush	Mike Williams	Robbie Mendez	Spinnin' Records
2022	When the Sun Is Gone	Mike Williams	RYVM	Spinnin' Records
2022	Sing Your Lullaby	Mike Williams	R3hab	CYB3RPVNK
2023	Dreams Come True	Mike Williams	Tungevaag	Spinnin' Records
"-" presents songs that Mike Williams works himself.

=== Remixes ===
Year	Title	Original artist(s)	Record label
2014	Shower (Mike Williams Future Remix)	Becky G	—
2014	Blame (Mike Williams Future Remix)	Calvin Harris	—
2014	Blame (Mike Williams Future Remix)	John Newman	—
2015	Outside (Mike Williams Remix)	Calvin Harris	—
2015	Outside (Mike Williams Remix)	Ellie Goulding	—
2016	The Right Song (Mike Williams Remix)	Tiësto	Universal Music Group
2016	The Right Song (Mike Williams Remix)	Oliver Heldens	Universal Music Group
2016	The Right Song (Mike Williams Remix)	Natalie La Rose	Universal Music Group
2016	Feel The Love (Mike Williams Remix)	Janieck	Spinnin' Remixes (Spinnin' Records)
2016	Money Maker (Mike Williams Remix)	Throttle	Spinnin' Remixes (Spinnin' Records)
2016	Money Maker (Mike Williams Remix)	LunchMoney Lewis	Spinnin' Remixes (Spinnin' Records)
2016	Money Maker (Mike Williams Remix)	Aston Merrygold	Spinnin' Remixes (Spinnin' Records)
2017	Hunter (Mike Williams Remix)	Galantis	Big Beat Records
2017	Trouble (Mike Williams Remix)	R3hab	CYB3RPVNK
2017	Trouble (Mike Williams Remix)	Vérité	CYB3RPVNK
2018	We Want Your Soul (Mike Williams Remix)	Dada Life	Future House Music
2019	How You Love Me (Mike Williams Remix)	Hardwell	Spinnin' Records
2019	How You Love Me (Mike Williams Remix)	Conor Maynard	Spinnin' Records
2019	How You Love Me (Mike Williams Remix)	Snoop Dogg	Spinnin' Records
2019	Wait for You (VIP Mix)	Mike Williams	Spinnin' Records
2019	Wait for You (VIP Mix)	Maia Wright	Spinnin' Records
2019	Who's Got Your Love (Mike Williams Remix)	Cheat Codes	Spinnin' Records
2019	Who's Got Your Love (Mike Williams Remix)	Daniel Blume	Spinnin' Records
2020	Blue (Mike Williams Remix)	Tiësto	Future House Music
2020	Blue (Mike Williams Remix)	Stevie Appleton	Future House Music
2020	Breaking Me (Mike Williams Remix)	Topic	Future House Music
2020	Breaking Me (Mike Williams Remix)	A7S	Future House Music
2021	Where the Lights Are Low (Mike Williams Remix)	Toby Romeo	Future House Music
2021	Where the Lights Are Low (Mike Williams Remix)	Felix Jaehn	Future House Music
2021	Where the Lights Are Low (Mike Williams Remix)	Faulhaber	Future House Music
2021	Going Dumb (Mike Williams Remix)	Alesso	Liquid State
2021	Going Dumb (Mike Williams Remix)	Stray Kids	Liquid State
2021	Going Dumb (Mike Williams Remix)	Corsak	Liquid State

== Notes ==
- A "Bambini" did not enter the Ultratop 50, but peaked at number 9 on the Walloon Dance Bubbling Under chart.
- B "Let's Go" did not enter the Ultratop 50, but peaked on the Flemish Ultratip chart.
- C "Feel Good" did not enter the Ultratop 50, but peaked on the Flemish Ultratip chart.
- D "Lullaby" did not enter the Singles Top 100, but peaked at number 28 on the Dance chart.
- E "Give It Up" did not enter the Ultratop 50, but peaked on the Flemish Ultratip chart.
- F "Wait Another Day" did not enter the Singles Top 100, but peaked at number 21 on the Single Tip chart.
- G "Wait Another Day" did not enter the Ultratop 50, but peaked on the Flemish Ultratip chart.
- H "Wait Another Day" did not enter the Ultratop 50, but peaked on the Walloon Ultratip chart.
- I "Wait for You" did not enter the Ultratop 50, but peaked on the Flemish Ultratip chart.
- J "Day or Night" did not enter the Ultratop 50, but peaked on the Walloon Ultratip chart.
- K "Make You Mine" did not enter the Ultratop 50, but peaked on the Flemish Ultratip chart.
- L "Make You Mine" did not enter the Ultratop 50, but peaked on the Walloon Ultratip chart.
