= Brooks (DJ) =

Dutch DJ

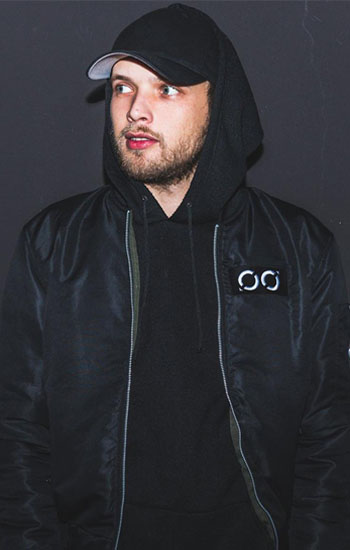

Background information
- Born: Thijs Westbroek; 14 April 1995 (age 31); Eindhoven, North Brabant, Netherlands
- Genres: Future house; future bounce; electro house; progressive house; future bass; big room house
- Occupations: Disc jockey; producer; musician
- Instruments: FL Studio
- Years active: 2013–present
- Labels: Future House Music; NoCopyrightSounds; Spinnin'; Skink; Armada; Stmpd Rcrds; 2-Dutch; Hexagon
- Website: musicbybrooks.com

Thijs Westbroek (Dutch pronunciation: [tɛis ˈʋɛstbruk]; born 14 April 1995), better known by his stage name Brooks, is a Dutch disc jockey, record producer and electronic musician. He is best known for his collaborations with Martin Garrix ("Byte", "Like I Do") and David Guetta ("Better When You're Gone", "Like I Do"), as well as for his numerous high-profile remixes.

== Career ==
Brooks' career as a disc jockey began when he sent his song to twenty random email addresses that could be related to Martin Garrix. To his delight, the song he sent was played by Garrix at a show. Not long after, Garrix contacted and told Brooks of his enthusiasm for his music. Garrix later invited him to his house to work on the "Byte" song. Brooks described the event as a "crazy story" and said he felt lucky.

== Discography ==
=== Singles ===
==== As lead artist ====
Title	Year	Peak chart positions											Certifications	Album
Title	Year	NL	AUT	BEL Dance	FRA	GER	ITA	NOR	SWE	SWI	UK	US Dance	Certifications	Album
"Get Down" (with Multiplayers)	2015	—	—	—	—	—	—	—	—	—	—	—		Non-album singles
"Alamo" (with Bassjackers)	2015	—	—	—	—	—	—	—	—	—	—	—		Non-album singles
"Pinball"	2015	—	—	—	—	—	—	—	—	—	—	—		Non-album singles
"If Only I Could"	2016	—	—	—	—	—	—	—	—	—	—	—		Non-album singles
"Make Your Move"	2016	—	—	—	—	—	—	—	—	—	—	—		Non-album singles
"Hold It Down" (featuring Micah Martin)	2016	—	—	—	—	—	—	—	—	—	—	—		Non-album singles
"Take Me Away" (with Jonas Aden)	2016	—	—	—	—	—	—	—	—	—	—	—		Generation HEX ADE Sampler
"Joyride" (with Bassjackers)	2017	—	—	—	—	—	—	—	—	—	—	—		Non-album singles
"On Our Own" (with Showtek featuring Natalie Major)	2017	—	—	—	—	—	—	—	—	—	—	—		Non-album singles
"Byte" (with Martin Garrix)	2017	2	—	23	104	—	—	—	—	—	—	49		Non-album singles
"Jetlag" (with Mike Williams)	2017	—	—	—	—	—	—	—	—	—	—	—		Non-album singles
"Boomerang" (with GRX)	2017	—	—	—	—	—	—	—	—	—	—	—		Non-album singles
"Like I Do" (with David Guetta and Martin Garrix)	2018	21	20	—	20	23	75	9	15	22	29	8	BPI: Silver; SNEP: Gold; RIAA: Gold	7
"Lynx"	2018	—	—	—	—	—	—	—	—	—	—	—		Non-album singles
"Limbo" (featuring Zoë Moss)	2018	—	—	—	—	—	—	—	—	—	—	—		Non-album singles
"Better When You're Gone" (with David Guetta featuring Loote)	2019	—	70	—	—	59	—	—	—	51	—	—		Non-album singles
"Waiting for Love" (featuring Alida)	2019	—	—	—	—	—	—	—	—	—	—	—		Non-album singles
"Riot" (with Jonas Aden)	2019	—	—	—	—	—	—	—	—	—	—	—		Non-album singles
"Say a Little Prayer" (featuring Gia Koka)	2020	—	—	—	—	—	—	—	—	—	—	—		Non-album singles
"Without You" (with Julian Jordan)	2020	—	—	—	—	—	—	—	—	—	—	—		Non-album singles
"Voices" (with Kshmr)	2020	—	—	—	—	—	—	—	—	—	—	—		Dharma: Sounds of Summer, Vol. II
"Long Time" (with Mesto)	2020	—	—	—	—	—	—	—	—	—	—	—		Non-album single
"Quantum" (with Martin Garrix)	2022	—	—	—	—	—	—	—	—	—	—	—		Sentio
"Take My Breath Away" (with Mo Falk)	2022	—	—	—	—	—	—	—	—	—	—	—		Non-album singles
"Someday" (with Isabel Usher)	2022	—	—	—	—	—	—	—	—	—	—	—		Non-album singles
"Sober" (with Vluarr featuring Jay Mason)	2022	—	—	—	—	—	—	—	—	—	—	—		Non-album singles
"One Night (Loneliness)" (featuring Moore)	2022	—	—	—	—	—	—	—	—	—	—			Non-album singles
"Call My Bluff" (with Vikkstar and Jex)	2026	_	_	_	_	_	_	_	_	_	_	_		
"—" denotes a recording that did not chart or was not released.

==== Writing / production credits ====
Title	Year	Artist(s)	Album
"Rewind"	2016	Markus Schulz	Watch the World
"Don't Shoot"	2017	Showtek & GC	Amen
"Blame It on Love" (featuring Madison Beer)	2018	David Guetta	7
"Tell Me a Lie"	2019	Jonas Aden	Non-album single

=== Remixes ===
Title	Year	Original artist(s)	Album
"50.000 Watts"	2013	Azzido Da Bass	50.000 Watts (Mixes)
"Crazy World"	2013	DJ Antoine and Mad Mark	Crazy World (Remixes)
"Booyah"	2013	Showtek, We Are Loud, Sonny Wilson	Booyah (Remixes)
"Cannonball (Earthquake)"	2014	Showtek, Justin Prime, Matthew Koma	Cannonball (Earthquake) (Remixes)
"Let's Do It Right"	2014	The Young Professionals featuring Eva Simons	Let's Do It Right (The Remixes Part 2)
"Stand by You"	2015	Gigo'n'Migo	Stand by You (Official Open Beatz Anthem 2015) Remixes
"Safe Till Tomorrow"	2016	Morgan Page featuring Angelika Vee	Safe Till Tomorrow (Remixes)
"Work from Home"	2016	Fifth Harmony featuring Ty Dolla $ign	Non-album remix
"Close"	2016	IZECOLD featuring Molly Ann	NCS: The Best of 2016
"Scared to Be Lonely"	2017	Martin Garrix and Dua Lipa	Scared to Be Lonely (Remixes Vol. 1)
"Feel Good"	2017	Gryffin and Illenium featuring Daya	Feel Good (The Remixes)
"Dusk Till Dawn"	2017	Zayn featuring Sia	Dusk Till Dawn (The Remixes)
"Dreamer"	2018	Martin Garrix featuring Mike Yung	Dreamer (Remixes Vol. 2)
"American Boy"	2019	Estelle featuring Kanye West	Non-album remixes
"Paper Thin"	2020	Illenium, Tom DeLonge and Angels & Airwaves	Non-album remixes
"Don't Leave Me Now"	2021	Lost Frequencies and Mathieu Koss	Don't Leave Me Now (Remix Pack)
"Sweet Dreams"	2021	Alan Walker and Imanbek	Sweet Dreams (Remixes)
"Worst Thing"	2022	NOTD and kenzie	Non-album remix
