= Loote =

American pop duo

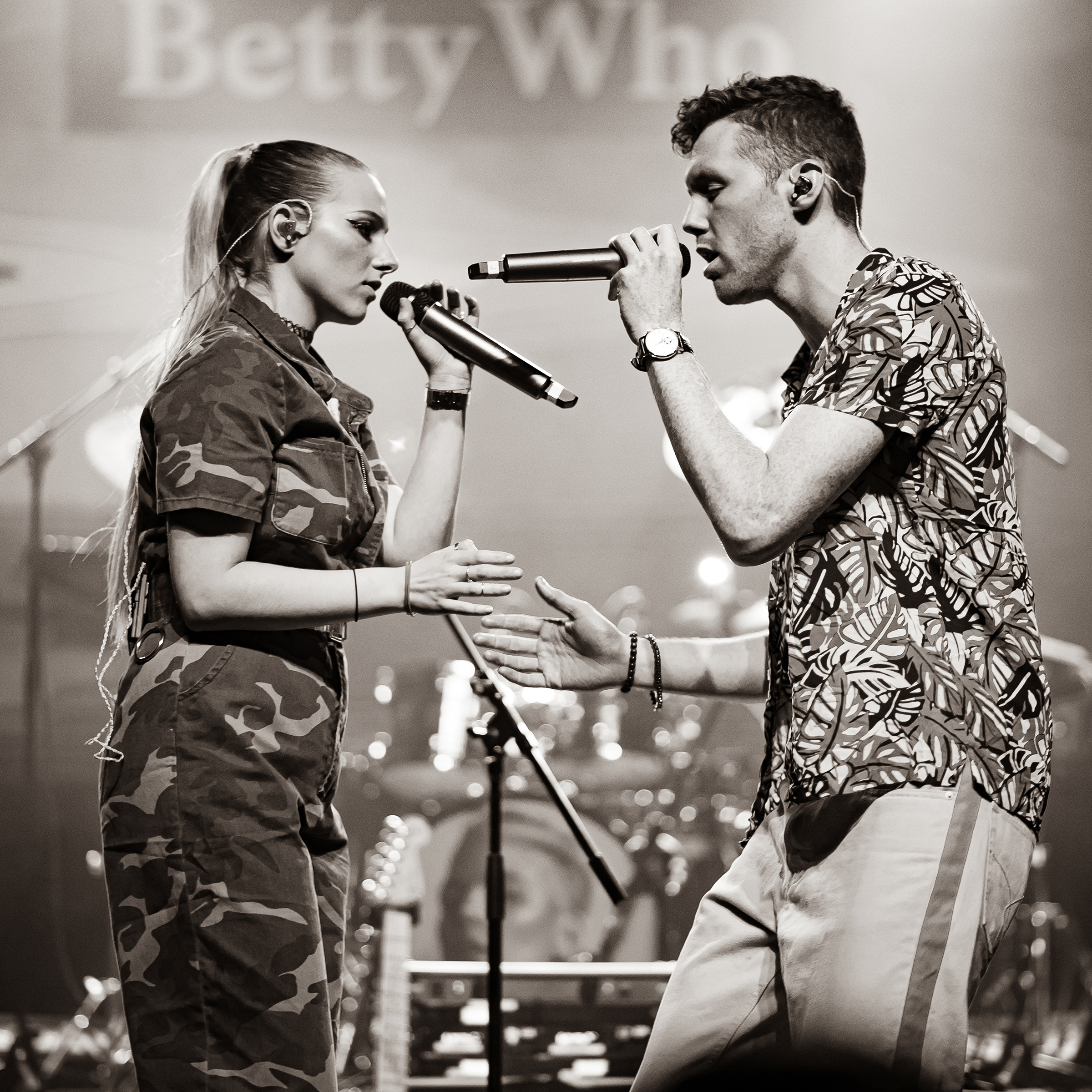
- Loote performing in June 2019

Background information
- Genres: Pop
- Years active: 2015–present
- Labels: 4th & B'way Records Island Records EMPIRE
- Members: Jackson Foote; Emma Lov Block
- Website: lootemusic.com

Loote is an American pop duo based in New York City consisting of Jackson Foote and Emma Lov Block. They released their debut single, "High Without Your Love", in May 2017 through Island Records.

== Background ==
Block's career began by writing jingles for commercials and children's television networks. By age 13, she was performing her songs at the Bitter End, on Bleecker Street, the oldest rock and roll club in New York City. In college, she met Foote in a writing class, and the two began writing songs together. In 2015, they signed to Universal Music Publishing Group through a joint venture with SRP as Loote. Their remix of Shawn Mendes' song "Mercy" was released on November 4, 2016. They co-wrote and produced "No Promises" by Cheat Codes and Demi Lovato, released in March 2017.

The duo released their debut single "High Without Your Love" in May 2017 through Island Records. The song peaked at No. 23 on Billboard's Spotify Velocity chart. Loote released an acoustic version of the song on May 26, 2017. The music video for "High Without Your Love" was released on July 31, 2017 to Loote's YouTube channel. The duo was featured in Martin Jensen's single "Wait", released August 18, 2017.

Loote's second single "Out of My Head" was released on September 8, 2017. Their third single, "Your Side of the Bed", was released on March 9, 2018. "Your Side of the Bed" was used as a backing track to BTS' "G.C.F in Osaka", published on April 30, 2018. On May 25, 2018, they released their fourth single, "Longer Than I Thought", featuring Joe Jonas. They released their debut EP Single (stylized as single.) on June 15, 2018. Their non-album single "Runaway" featuring Korean singer Eric Nam released on May 18, 2019. They released the single "tomorrow tonight" on May 16, 2019. On January 31, 2020, they released "Wasted Summer" with teamwork. and John K. On April 24, they released the Heart Eyes EP.

== Discography ==
=== EPs ===
List of EPs, with selected details
Title	Details
single.	Released: June 15, 2018; Label: Island; Format: Digital download
lost	Released: June 14, 2019; Label: Island; Format: Digital download
Heart Eyes	Released: April 24, 2020; Label: Empire; Format: Digital download

=== Singles ===
==== As lead artists ====
Title	Year	Peak chart position	Album
Title	Year	Billboard Spotify Velocity	Album
"High Without Your Love"	2017	23	single.
"Out of My Head"	2017	—	single.
"Your Side of the Bed"	2018	—	single.
"Longer Than I Thought" (featuring Joe Jonas)	2018	—	single.
"Good to Me"	2018	—	single.
"Back Together"	2018	—	Non-album singles
"Better When You're Gone" (with David Guetta & Brooks)	2019	—	Non-album singles
"85%" (featuring gnash)	2019	—	lost
"Tomorrow Tonight"	2019	—	lost
"All the Fucking Time"	2019	—	Heart Eyes
"Wasted Summer" (with teamwork. & John K)	2020	—	Non-album single
"This Is How U Feel"	2020	—	Heart Eyes
"Somebody Else"	2020	—	Heart Eyes
"Pushing Daisies"	2020	—	TBA
"Who You Are"	2020	—	TBA
"Exes"	2020	—	TBA

==== As featured artists ====
Title	Year	Peak chart position	Album
Title	Year	Billboard Spotify Velocity	Album
"Wait" (Martin Jensen featuring Loote)	2017	44	Non-album singles
"Hands On Me" (White Panda featuring Loote)	2018	—	Non-album singles
"Changed My Mind" (Samuraii featuring Loote)	2018	—	Non-album singles
"Don't Call Me" (Nevada featuring Loote)	2018	—	Non-album singles

=== Remixes ===
Title	Year	Album
"Wish I Never Met You" (Feather Remix)	2018	Wish I Never Met You (Feather Remix)

=== Writing and production credits ===
Title	Year	Artist	Album	Role
"One in the Same"	2016	Ayokay featuring Quinn XCII	4ft to Infinity (EP)	writer
"Silence" (Sluggo x Loote Remix)	2016	Mike Posner featuring Labrinth	At Night, Alone.	producer
"Mercy" (Loote Remix)	2016	Shawn Mendes	non-album single	producer
"No Promises"	2017	Cheat Codes featuring Demi Lovato	non-album single	producer, writer
"Raincoat" (Loote Remix)	2017	Timeflies & Loote featuring Shy Martin	non-album single	producer
"Wicked" (Loote Remix)	2017	Mansionz	non-album single	producer
"Whenever"	2018	Kris Kross Amsterdam and The Boy Next Door featuring Conor Maynard	non-album single	producer
"Don't Need the Real Thing" (Loote Remix)	2018	Kandace Springs	non-album single	producer
"Fake It"	2018	Wingtip	non-album single	writer
"Ruin My Life"	2018	Zara Larsson	Poster Girl	producer, writer
"Desperate"	2018	Jonas Blue featuring Nina Nesbitt	Blue	producer, writer
"Runaway"	2019	Eric Nam	non-album single	producer

Notes
- "Ruin My Life" and "Desperate" were co-written by Jackson Foote only.
