= Goodbye (Jason Derulo and David Guetta song) =

Single by Jason Derulo and David Guetta featuring Nicki Minaj and Willy William

from the album 7
- Released: August 24, 2018
- Studio: Larrabee Sound (North Hollywood, California); Future History (Los Angeles, California); Glenwood Place (Burbank, California); Studio Urbain (Paris, France)
- Genre: EDM; R&B
- Length: 3:15
- Label: Beluga Heights; Warner Bros.
- Songwriters: David Guetta; Phil Greiss; Willy William; David Saint Fleur; Art Beatz; Curtis Gray; Jean-Michel Sissoko; DJ Paulito; Jazelle Rodriguez; Christopher Tempest; Kinnda; Minaj; Derulo; Francesco Sartori; Lucio Quarantotto; Frank Peterson
- Producers: David Guetta; Phil Greiss; David Saint Fleur; Vodka; Art Beatz (addi.); Curtis Gray (addi.)

Jason Derulo singles chronology
"Colors" (2018)	"Goodbye" (2018)	"Make Up" (2018)

David Guetta singles chronology
"Don't Leave Me Alone" (2018)	"Goodbye" (2018)	"Drive" (2018)

Nicki Minaj singles chronology
"Barbie Dreams" (2018)	"Goodbye" (2018)	"Idol" (2018)

Willy William singles chronology
"La La La" (2018)	"Goodbye" (2018)	"Highway" (2019)

Music video
- "Goodbye" on YouTube

"Goodbye" is a song by the American singer Jason Derulo and the French music producer David Guetta, featuring the American rapper Nicki Minaj and the French musician Willy William. It was adapted and written by the artists alongside Jmi Sissoko, DJ Paulito, Kinnda, JVZEL, VodKa, Phil Greiss, David Saint Fleur, Art Beatz, and Curtis Gray, the latter five receiving production credits along with Guetta; Francesco Sartori, Lucio Quarantotto, and Frank Peterson are credited due to the inclusion of elements of their composition "Time to Say Goodbye", as performed by Sarah Brightman and Andrea Bocelli. "Goodbye" is included on Guetta's seventh studio album, 7 (2018).

The song debuted on August 23, 2018, and was released a day later by both Guetta and Derulo's record labels – What a Music, Parlophone, Beluga Heights and Warner Bros. Records respectively. It is the sixth single from Guetta's 7 album and was unveiled alongside another single from Guetta called "Drive" with Black Coffee and featuring Delilah Montagu.

== Background ==
On August 24, 2018, Guetta unveiled the sixth and seventh singles from his seventh album 7 (2018), "Goodbye" and then also "Drive" (with Black Coffee featuring Delilah Montagu). "Goodbye" is a collaboration with US R&B singer Jason Derulo and features American rapper Nicki Minaj, as well as French musician and DJ Willy William. Guetta and Minaj have previously collaborated four times, beginning in 2011 with "Where Them Girls At" (also featuring Flo Rida) and "Turn Me On", both taken from Guetta's fifth album Nothing but the Beat. In 2015 they collaborated on "Hey Mama" (also featuring Bebe Rexha and Afrojack) for his sixth album Listen (2014). In 2017, they released the collaboration "Light My Body Up" (also featuring Lil Wayne). Meanwhile, Minaj and Derulo first collaborated in 2010 when she featured on the remix to his single "In My Head", taken from Derulo's debut self-titled studio album. They reunited in 2017 for the collaboration "Swalla" (also featuring Ty Dolla $ign).

The song's lyric video was released alongside the song's announcement. It features on Guetta's album 7 as track number six. "Goodbye" samples "Time to Say Goodbye" by Italian opera singer Andrea Bocelli. The official music video was released on October 21, 2018.

== Live performances ==
Guetta, Derulo and Minaj performed the song at the 2018 MTV Europe Music Awards.

== Personnel ==
Credits adapted from album booklet.

- Phil Greiss – producer, engineer, keyboards, mastering, mixer, recording
- David Saint Fleur – producer
- David Guetta – producer, DJ
- Vodka – producer
- Kat Dahlia – background vocals
- Jazelle "JVZEL" Rodriguez – background vocals
- Ludovic Mullor – engineer
- Ben Hogarth – engineer
- Aubry "Big Juice" Delaine – engineer
- Luca Pretolesi – mastering, mixing
- Jason Derulo – vocals
- Nicki Minaj – vocals
- Willy William – vocals

== Charts ==
=== Weekly charts ===
Weekly chart performance for "Goodbye"
Chart (2018)	Peak position
Australia (ARIA)	33
Austria (Ö3 Austria Top 40)	57
Belgium (Ultratop 50 Flanders)	20
Belgium (Ultratop 50 Wallonia)	15
Canada Hot 100 (Billboard)	68
Canada CHR/Top 40 (Billboard)	41
Croatia (HRT)	65
Czech Republic Singles Digital (ČNS IFPI)	29
Estonia (Eesti Tipp-40)	25
France (SNEP)	93
Germany (GfK)	47
Greece (IFPI)	79
Hungary (Single Top 40)	13
Hungary (Stream Top 40)	19
Ireland (IRMA)	27
Italy (FIMI)	92
Lebanon (Lebanese Top 20)	7
Lithuania (AGATA)	22
Netherlands (Dutch Top 40)	10
Netherlands (Single Top 100)	16
New Zealand Hot Singles (RMNZ)	7
Norway (VG-lista)	25
Poland Airplay (ZPAV)	25
Portugal (AFP)	47
Puerto Rico (Monitor Latino)	13
Romania (Airplay 100)	77
Scottish Singles Sales (Official Charts)	15
Slovakia Airplay (ČNS IFPI)	9
Slovakia Singles Digital (ČNS IFPI)	14
Spain (PROMUSICAE)	66
Sweden (Sverigetopplistan)	16
Switzerland (Schweizer Hitparade)	50
UK Singles (Official Charts)	26
US Bubbling Under Hot 100 (Billboard)	7
US Hot Dance/Electronic Songs (Billboard)	9
US Pop Airplay (Billboard)	26
US Rhythmic Airplay (Billboard)	24
Venezuela (National-Report)	5

=== Year-end charts ===
Year-end chart performance for "Goodbye"
Chart (2018)	Position
Netherlands (Dutch Top 40)	80
US Hot Dance/Electronic Songs (Billboard)	30
Chart (2019)	Position
US Hot Dance/Electronic Songs (Billboard)	79

== Certifications ==
Certifications for "Goodbye"
Region	Certification	Certified units/sales
Australia (ARIA)	Platinum	70,000^{‡}
Austria (IFPI Austria)	Gold	15,000^{‡}
Canada (Music Canada)	Platinum	80,000^{‡}
France (SNEP)	Gold	100,000^{‡}
Italy (FIMI)	Gold	25,000^{‡}
New Zealand (RMNZ)	Gold	15,000^{‡}
Poland (ZPAV)	Gold	10,000^{‡}
Spain (Promusicae)	Gold	30,000^{‡}
United Kingdom (BPI)	Gold	400,000^{‡}
United States (RIAA)	Gold	500,000^{‡}
^{‡} Sales+streaming figures based on certification alone.

== Release history ==
Release history and formats for "Goodbye"
Region	Date	Format	Version	Label	Ref.
Various	August 24, 2018	Digital download	Original	What a Music; Parlophone; Beluga Heights; Warner Bros.	
United States	September 4, 2018	Contemporary hit radio	Original	Warner Bros.	
Various	November 23, 2018	Digital download	R3HAB Remix	What a Music; Parlophone; Beluga Heights; Warner Bros.	
