= Your Love (David Guetta and Showtek song) =

Single by David Guetta and Showtek

from the album 7
- Released: 14 June 2018
- Genre: Future house
- Length: 3:05
- Label: What a Music; Parlophone
- Songwriters: David Guetta; Jaap Reesema; Wouter Janssen; Sjoerd Janssen; Joren van der Voort; Allen George; Fred Craig McFarlane
- Producers: David Guetta; Showtek; Ralph Wegner

David Guetta singles chronology
| "Flames" (2018) | "Your Love" (2018) | "Don't Leave Me Alone" (2018) |

Showtek singles chronology
| "Believer" (2016) | "Your Love" (2018) | "Down Easy" (2018) |

"Your Love" is a song by French music producer David Guetta and Dutch electronic dance music duo Showtek. It was written by Fred McFarlane, Joren van der Voort, Jaap Reesema, Allen George, Guetta, Showtek and Ralph Wegner, with production handled by the latter three. The song was released commercially for digital download and streaming on 14 June 2018 by Guetta's record label What a Music. The song serves as a bonus single from Guetta’s album 7. It contains an interpolation of "Show Me Love" by American singer Robin S.

== Personnel ==
Credits adapted from Tidal.

- David Guetta – production, programming
- Showtek – production, mixing, programming
- Ralph Wegner – production, programming
- Wired Mastering – master engineering
- Jaap Reesema – vocals

== Charts ==
Weekly chart performance for "Your Love"
| Chart (2018) | Peak position |
|---|---|
| Belgium (Ultratip Bubbling Under Wallonia) | 14 |
| Germany (GfK) | 70 |
| France (SNEP) | 83 |
| Italy (Musica e dischi) | 35 |
| Poland (Polish Airplay Top 100) | 27 |
| Poland (Dance Top 50) | 12 |
| Sweden (Sverigetopplistan) | 32 |
| Switzerland (Schweizer Hitparade) | 53 |

== Certifications ==
Certifications for "Your Love"
| Region | Certification | Certified units/sales |
|---|---|---|
| Poland (ZPAV) | Gold | 25,000^{‡} |
^{‡} Sales+streaming figures based on certification alone.
