= Byte (song) =

Single by Martin Garrix and Brooks
- Released: 7 April 2017
- Recorded: 2017
- Genre: Future bounce; future house
- Length: 4:45
- Label: Stmpd; Epic Amsterdam; Sony Netherlands
- Songwriters: Martijn Garritsen; Thijs Westbroek
- Producers: Martin Garrix; Brooks

Martin Garrix singles chronology
"Scared to Be Lonely" (2017)	"Byte" (2017)	"There for You" (2017)

Brooks singles chronology
"On Our Own" (2017)	"Byte" (2017)	"Jetlag" (2017)

"Byte" is a song by Dutch DJs Martin Garrix and Brooks. It was released on 7 April 2017, via Garrix's record label Stmpd Rcrds and Sony.

== Background ==
Garrix debuted the song at the 2017 Ultra Music Festival in Miami. He revealed a snippet of the song on Snapchat one day prior to the festival, and on Instagram several months ago. In a tweet by Garrix, he stated he was releasing two "things" on Friday, 7 April 2017 — the song "Byte" and the acoustic version of his previous single "Scared to Be Lonely" with British singer Dua Lipa. "Byte" is described as a 'return to EDM' for Garrix as his previous singles "In the Name of Love" and "Scared to Be Lonely" were seen as pop music. Before its release, the song was compared to Garrix's 2014 collaboration "Tremor" with Dimitri Vegas & Like Mike.

== Track listing ==
No.	Title	Length
1.	"Byte" (with Brooks)	4:45

== Charts ==
Chart (2017)	Peak position
Belgium Dance (Ultratop Flanders)	23
Belgium Dance (Ultratop Wallonia)	40
Netherlands (Tipparade)	2
US Dance/Electronic Songs (Billboard)	49

== In popular culture ==
The song was used of the American animated television series The Simpsons of the thirty-first season in the episode "The Miseducation of Lisa Simpson", where Bart played this song as a "DJ gig" to the other students.
