= Helium (Sia song) =

2018 single by Sia

Song by Sia

from the album Fifty Shades Darker: Original Motion Picture Soundtrack
- Released: 10 February 2017
- Studio: Magical Thinking Studios (London); Hill House Studios; Village Studios
- Length: 4:12
- Label: Republic; Monkey Puzzle
- Songwriter(s): Sia Furler; Chris Braide
- Producer(s): Chris Braide; Oliver Kraus

"Helium"

Single by Sia vs. David Guetta and Afrojack
- Released: 25 January 2018
- Length: 3:57
- Label: Atlantic; Monkey Puzzle
- Songwriter(s): Sia Furler; Chris Braide
- Producer(s): David Guetta; Afrojack

Sia singles chronology
"Snowman" (2017)	"Helium" (2018)	"Flames" (2018)

David Guetta singles chronology
"So Far Away" (2017)	"Helium" (2018)	"Mad Love" (2018)

Afrojack singles chronology
"New Memories" (2017)	"Helium" (2018)	"Bed of Cards" (2018)

"Helium" is a song recorded by Australian singer-songwriter Sia for the Fifty Shades Darker soundtrack. The soundtrack was released in support of the 2017 film Fifty Shades Darker, an adaptation of the novel of the same name from the Fifty Shades trilogy. Sia wrote the song with frequent collaborator Chris Braide; Braide produced the song with Oliver Kraus. A remix of the song with David Guetta and Afrojack was released as a standalone single on 25 January 2018.

== Track listing ==
Digital download – album track

1. "Helium" – 4:12

Digital download – remix

1. "Helium" (Sia vs. David Guetta and Afrojack) – 3:57

== Personnel ==
Adapted from Tidal.

- Chris Braide – composer, producer
- Brad Haehnel – mixer
- Oliver Kraus – producer
- Sia – composer

== Charts ==
Album version
Chart (2017)	Peak position
Austria (Ö3 Austria Top 40)	21
Belgium (Ultratop 50 Flanders)	29
Belgium (Ultratip Bubbling Under Wallonia)	16
France (SNEP)	10
Germany (GfK)	30
Norway (VG-lista)	15
Spain (PROMUSICAE)	22
Switzerland (Schweizer Hitparade)	19
US Billboard Hot 100	71

Remix version
Chart (2018)	Peak position
Australia (ARIA)	88
Austria (Ö3 Austria Top 40)	64
New Zealand Heatseekers (RMNZ)	6
Sweden (Sverigetopplistan)	61
Switzerland (Schweizer Hitparade)	43

== Certifications ==
Certifications for "Helium"
Region	Certification	Certified units/sales
Denmark (IFPI Danmark)	Gold	45,000^{‡}
Italy (FIMI)	Gold	25,000^{‡}
New Zealand (RMNZ)	Gold	15,000^{‡}
Poland (ZPAV)	Gold	25,000^{‡}
Portugal (AFP)	Gold	5,000^{‡}
Spain (PROMUSICAE)	Gold	30,000^{‡}
United Kingdom (BPI)	Gold	400,000^{‡}
^{‡} Sales+streaming figures based on certification alone.
