= Dirty Sexy Money (song) =

Single by David Guetta and Afrojack featuring Charli XCX and French Montana

from the album 7
- Released: 3 November 2017
- Studio: Tribe Studios Naples, Italy
- Genre: EDM; pop-rap; hip house; dance pop; electronic
- Length: 2:47
- Label: What a Music
- Songwriters: Karim Kharbouch; Nick Van De Wall; Jonnali Parmenius; Alexander Guy Cook; David Guetta; Charlotte Aitchison
- Producers: David Guetta; Afrojack; Skrillex (co.)

David Guetta singles chronology
"Complicated" (2017)	"Dirty Sexy Money" (2017)	"So Far Away" (2017)

Afrojack singles chronology
"No Tomorrow" (2017)	"Dirty Sexy Money" (2017)	"New Memories" (2017)

Charli XCX singles chronology
"Boys" (2017)	"Dirty Sexy Money" (2017)	"Out of My Head" (2017)

French Montana singles chronology
"Boom Boom" (2017)	"Dirty Sexy Money" (2017)	"Tip Toe" (2017)

Music video
- "Dirty Sexy Money" on YouTube

"Dirty Sexy Money" is a song by French DJ and record producer David Guetta and Dutch DJ and music producer Afrojack featuring British singer Charli XCX and Moroccan-American rapper French Montana. It was released on 3 November 2017 as a bonus track from Guetta's seventh studio album, 7 (2018). Noonie Bao and A. G. Cook assisted the artists in writing the song with Skrillex being listed as a co-producer.

== Background ==
The song premiered during Guetta's final performance at the Amsterdam Dance Event, when Afrojack joined him on stage. It premiered on Zane Lowe's Beats 1 radio show. Lowe held a FaceTime call with Guetta and Charli XCX, in which Guetta regarded the song as "the record I've been trying to make all my life". Charli XCX said of the recording process: "I was in L.A. working in the studio on, like, a load of David tracks actually. We had kinda done like a couple of things that day and then I heard this track and I just, like, immediately connected with it. I was writing with Noonie Bao and A. G. Cook and the track just like immediately spoke to me. David came down to the studio and we kinda, like, connected on this song so hard. It just made me wanna party straight away."

Dutch neo-pop artist Selwyn Senatori, who created the song's artwork, talked about how he encountered Guetta: "David and I met through producer Giorgio Tuinfort. During ADE, I invited him to my studio, and the idea of cooperation arose because he was very impressed with what he saw there. I applied my contemporary art to Dirty Sexy Money and for this I consciously chose strong, clear shapes and a raw character. The result is a mix of pop, modern, retro and my own characteristic influences which goes perfectly with the mix of styles from David, Afrojack, Charli XCX and French Montana on the track."

== Critical reception ==
Kat Bein of Billboard described the song as "naughty pop music with a punch and a side of '90s nostalgia". He called the song a "freaky bedroom anthem", and felt it "makes being bad sounds really cute". Chantilly Post of HotNewHipHop wrote that the drop contains "the usual David Guetta/Afrojack sound" and that there are "a lot of repeating of words" throughout the song, which makes it "sounds like a usual pop radio track". Erik of EDM Sauce wrote a negative review of the song, calling the combination of the artists' styles "a bit of an identity crisis rather than a successful integration of defined sounds". Jason Heffler of Earmilk also gave the song a negative review, calling it "a regurgitated made-for-radio snoozer with a moth-eaten arrangement that panders with no regard for originality".

== Music video ==
The heist-themed music video was released on 14 December 2017, and was directed by Charli XCX and Sarah McColgan. In the visual, Guetta stars as the getaway driver, Charli XCX as the boss, Afrojack as the muscle and French Montana as the explosives expert. Masked characters, led by Charli XCX, can be seen chasing a man for his money and robbing an underground bank. Charli XCX's friend and long time collaborator, Brooke Candy, as well as Dorian Electra, Alma and Lizzo also appear in the video alongside French Montana.

== Live performances ==
On 12 November 2017, Guetta performed the song with Charli XCX and Montana at the 2017 MTV Europe Music Awards.

== Track listing ==
Digital download
No.	Title	Length
1.	"Dirty Sexy Money" (featuring Charli XCX and French Montana)	2:52

Digital download – remixes
No.	Title	Length
1.	"Dirty Sexy Money" (featuring Charli XCX and French Montana) (Cesqeaux remix)	3:00
2.	"Dirty Sexy Money" (featuring Charli XCX and French Montana) (Mesto remix)	3:40
3.	"Dirty Sexy Money" (featuring Charli XCX and French Montana) (Joe Stone remix)	4:57
4.	"Dirty Sexy Money" (featuring Charli XCX and French Montana) (Kiida remix)	3:11
5.	"Dirty Sexy Money" (featuring Charli XCX and French Montana) (Banx & Ranx remix)	3:06
6.	"Dirty Sexy Money" (featuring Charli XCX and French Montana) (Tom Martin remix)	3:52

== Credits and personnel ==
Credits adapted from Tidal.

- David Guetta – songwriting, production
- Afrojack – songwriting, production
- Charli XCX – songwriting
- French Montana – songwriting
- Noonie Bao – songwriting
- A. G. Cook – songwriting
- Daddy's Groove – master engineering, mixing
- Skrillex – co-production

== Charts ==
=== Weekly charts ===
Chart (2017–2018)	Peak position
Australia (ARIA)	18
Australia Dance (ARIA)	2
Austria (Ö3 Austria Top 40)	46
Belgium (Ultratip Bubbling Under Flanders)	4
Belgium Dance (Ultratop Flanders)	5
Belgium (Ultratop 50 Wallonia)	41
Belgium Dance (Ultratop Wallonia)	3
Canada Hot 100 (Billboard)	90
CIS Airplay (TopHit)	16
Czech Republic Airplay (ČNS IFPI)	39
Czech Republic Singles Digital (ČNS IFPI)	93
France (SNEP)	57
Germany (GfK)	46
Hungary (Dance Top 40)	29
Ireland (IRMA)	41
Israel International TV Airplay (Media Forest)	2
Latvia (DigiTop100)	64
Netherlands (Dutch Top 40)	18
Netherlands (Mega Top 50)	29
Netherlands (Single Top 100)	60
New Zealand (Recorded Music NZ)	26
Portugal (AFP)	88
Russia Airplay (TopHit)	10
Slovakia Singles Digital (ČNS IFPI)	71
Spain (Promusicae)	47
Sweden (Sverigetopplistan)	82
Switzerland (Schweizer Hitparade)	52
UK Singles (Official Charts)	35
UK Dance (Official Charts)	6
US Hot Dance/Electronic Songs (Billboard)	13

=== Year-end charts ===
Chart (2018)	Position
Hungary (Dance Top 40)	72
US Hot Dance/Electronic Songs (Billboard)	60

== Certifications ==
Region	Certification	Certified units/sales
Australia (ARIA)	Platinum	70,000^{‡}
France (SNEP)	Gold	66,666^{‡}
New Zealand (RMNZ)	Platinum	30,000^{‡}
United Kingdom (BPI)	Silver	200,000^{‡}
^{‡} Sales+streaming figures based on certification alone.
