= So Far Away (Martin Garrix and David Guetta song) =

Single by Martin Garrix and David Guetta featuring Jamie Scott and Romy Dya
- Released: 1 December 2017
- Genre: Futurepop
- Length: 3:03
- Label: Stmpd
- Songwriters: Martijn Garritsen; Jamie Scott; David Guetta; Giorgio Tuinfort; Jason Boyd
- Producers: Giorgio Tuinfort; Martin Garrix; David Guetta

Martin Garrix singles chronology
"Forever" (2017)	"So Far Away" (2017)	"Like I Do" (2018)

David Guetta singles chronology
"Dirty Sexy Money" (2017)	"So Far Away" (2017)	"Helium" (2018)

Jamie Scott singles chronology
"Searching" (2005)	"So Far Away" (2017)

Music video
- "So Far Away" on YouTube

"So Far Away" is a song by Dutch DJ and record producer Martin Garrix and French DJ and record producer David Guetta, featuring guest vocals from British singer Jamie Scott and Dutch singer Romy Dya. Released on 1 December 2017 via Stmpd Rcrds, it was written by Scott, Poo Bear, Garrix, Guetta and Giorgio Tuinfort, with production handled by the latter three.

The song serves as a bonus track from Guetta's seventh studio album 7. The song was premiered during Garrix's performance at Tomorrowland 2017.

== Background ==
On 30 July 2017, Garrix invited Guetta on stage to perform the song for the first time, during his mainstage appearance at Tomorrowland 2017. This original version featured female vocals provided by English singer Ellie Goulding.

On 21 August, Garrix brought Guetta on stage to play the song once again, during a performance in Ibiza. A short footage captured by someone in the booth surfaced on Instagram.

Prior to the performance, Garrix told Capital about the song, calling it a "radio-friendly song" that will be released soon. Garrix posted short studio teasers of the song via Instagram Stories on 19 November, suggesting that it would be released soon.

On 22 November, Garrix revealed that Goulding was no longer featured on the song, when replying to an Ellie Goulding fan account on Twitter, who commented on Garrix's teasers. Goulding admitted in a series of tweets that her management and label were displeased because Garrix played the song at Tomorrowland before she had even heard the final product, leading to her vocals being cut from the track, but she emphasized that she was not behind the decision. She wrote that Garrix's statement "she didn't want to release it" is "completely untrue and unfair".

Garrix confirmed on 26 November that "So Far Away" and the Area21 track "Glad You Came" would be released on the same day, when replying to a fan who tweeted him asking which one comes out first. On 29 November, Garrix released an official teaser on social media, revealing the song's release date and featured artists, Jamie Scott and Romy Dya, the latter of which sang on the demo version of the track.

== Critical reception ==
Kat Bein of Billboard called the song "a beautiful, future-pop ballad". He praised Dya for providing a "vulnerable and powerful" performance. Matthew Meadow of Your EDM also wrote that Dya did a "phenomenal job" with Scott, giving listeners goosebumps. He criticized the drop for its lack of originality, calling it "Scared to Be Lonely v2". Erik of EDM Sauce gave a similar review, writing: "The song will most likely not see the same level of success without Ellie Goulding as it is nothing absolutely outstandingly original." He also wrote that the song "has heaps of mainstream appeal" and "is exactly what the radio audiences in America currently look for in a release".

== Music video ==
The accompanying music video was directed and produced by Damian Karsznia. The storyline features a young couple who were once in love and are currently struggling with the end of their relationship.

As of May 2021, the video has received over 233 million views.

== Track listing ==
Digital download
No.	Title	Length
1.	"So Far Away" (featuring Jamie Scott and Romy Dya)	3:03

Digital download – remixes vol. 1
No.	Title	Length
1.	"So Far Away" (featuring Jamie Scott and Romy Dya; Blinders remix)	3:16
2.	"So Far Away" (featuring Jamie Scott and Romy Dya; Nicky Romero remix)	5:42
3.	"So Far Away" (featuring Jamie Scott and Romy Dya; BLR remix)	3:03
4.	"So Far Away" (featuring Jamie Scott and Romy Dya; TV Noise remix)	3:00
5.	"So Far Away" (featuring Jamie Scott and Romy Dya; CLiQ remix)	3:33
6.	"So Far Away" (featuring Jamie Scott and Romy Dya; CLiQ dub mix)	5:44

Digital download – remixes vol. 2
No.	Title	Length
1.	"So Far Away" (featuring Jamie Scott and Romy Dya; CMC$ remix)	2:46
2.	"So Far Away" (featuring Jamie Scott and Romy Dya; Codes remix)	4:01
3.	"So Far Away" (featuring Jamie Scott and Romy Dya; Curbi remix)	3:29
4.	"So Far Away" (featuring Jamie Scott and Romy Dya; Bad Decisions remix)	4:06
5.	"So Far Away" (featuring Jamie Scott and Romy Dya; Osrin remix)	3:20

== Credits and personnel ==
Credits adapted from Tidal.

- Martin Garrix – songwriting, production, mixing engineering
- David Guetta – songwriting, production
- Jamie Scott – songwriting, vocal production
- Giorgio Tuinfort – songwriting, production, engineering
- Poo Bear – songwriting
- Martin Hannah – engineering
- Rutger Kroese – engineering
- Jonny Coffer – vocal production

== Charts ==
=== Weekly charts ===
Chart (2017–2018)	Peak position
Australia (ARIA)	58
Austria (Ö3 Austria Top 40)	12
Belgium (Ultratop 50 Flanders)	39
Belgium Dance (Ultratop Flanders)	5
Belgium (Ultratop 50 Wallonia)	28
Belgium Dance (Ultratop Wallonia)	6
Canada Hot 100 (Billboard)	69
Czech Republic Airplay (ČNS IFPI)	35
Finland (Suomen virallinen lista)	10
France (SNEP)	83
Germany (GfK)	8
Hungary (Rádiós Top 40)	25
Hungary (Single Top 40)	8
Hungary (Stream Top 40)	11
Ireland (IRMA)	98
Latvia (DigiTop100)	23
Malaysia (RIM)	12
Netherlands (Dutch Top 40)	7
Netherlands (Single Top 100)	14
New Zealand Heatseekers (RMNZ)	3
Norway (VG-lista)	14
Portugal (AFP)	58
Romania (Airplay 100)	6
Slovakia Airplay (ČNS IFPI)	14
Slovenia (SloTop50)	22
Spain (Promusicae)	85
Sweden (Sverigetopplistan)	30
Switzerland (Schweizer Hitparade)	14
UK Singles (Official Charts)	81
US Dance Club Songs (Billboard)	6
US Hot Dance/Electronic Songs (Billboard)	11

=== Year-end charts ===
Chart (2018)	Position
Estonia (Eesti Tipp-40)	55
Germany (Official German Charts)	33
Netherlands (Dutch Top 40)	64
Netherlands (Single Top 100)	96
Romania (Airplay 100)	31
Slovenia (SloTop50)	39
Switzerland (Schweizer Hitparade)	61
US Hot Dance/Electronic Songs (Billboard)	36

== Certifications ==
Region	Certification	Certified units/sales
Australia (ARIA)	Gold	35,000^{‡}
Austria (IFPI Austria)	Gold	15,000^{‡}
Belgium (BRMA)	Gold	10,000^{‡}
Brazil (Pro-Música Brasil)	Platinum	40,000^{‡}
Canada (Music Canada)	Gold	40,000^{‡}
France (SNEP)	Gold	100,000^{‡}
Germany (BVMI)	Platinum	400,000^{‡}
Italy (FIMI)	Gold	25,000^{‡}
Mexico (AMPROFON)	Platinum+Gold	90,000^{‡}
New Zealand (RMNZ)	Gold	15,000^{‡}
Poland (ZPAV)	Gold	25,000^{‡}
Spain (Promusicae)	Gold	30,000^{‡}
United Kingdom (BPI)	Silver	200,000^{‡}
United States (RIAA)	Gold	500,000^{‡}
^{‡} Sales+streaming figures based on certification alone.
