= Future House Music =

- Founded: July 2014
- Founder: Aart van den Dool; Gino van Eijk
- Genre: Future house; Tech house; Deep house; Bass house; Electro house; Brazilian bass
- Location: Rotterdam, Netherlands
- Official website: futurehousemusic.net

Future House Music (FHM) is a Dutch record label and music network that specializes in the future house genre. Their channel has over 1 million subscribers on YouTube.

== History ==
Future House Music was started in 2014 by Aart van den Dool and Gino van Eijk. Originally starting out with genres such as electro house, progressive house, deep house and tech house, the label eventually focused on future house as, asserted by Van Eijk, it was "placed on the map" by the genre's pioneers Oliver Heldens and Tchami. Their YouTube channel was started after Van Eijk and Van Den Dool became inspired by Tchami's term-coining of future house.

They eventually decided to use the channel as a platform to "bundle" music of the genre. They said "We had the first mover advantage. Nobody had claimed the name 'Future House Music' yet. We did not know, of course, that it would be that big. But of course we also worked really hard for that." Since the formation of their YouTube channel, the identity of "Future House Music" included an addition of a record label (formed in 2016), merchandises and international events.

== Artists ==
- Andy Bianchini
- Asketa
- AWR
- BCMP
- Bobby Rock
- Bougenvilla
- Brooks
- Dastic
- DLMT
- D-Wayne
- Ellis
- FaderX
- Higher Self
- Holl & Rush
- Jelle Slump
- Jonas Aden
- Junior J
- Lenx & Denx
- Maiki Vanics
- Matt Nash
- Merk & Kremont
- Mike Williams
- Movenchy
- Mr. Belt & Wezol
- musicbyLUKAS
- Natan Chaim
- Pep & Rash
- Pnut & Jelly
- RAWD
- Redondo
- RetroVision
- Robby East
- Steff Da Campo
- Takura
- Tom Budin
