= Fifty Shades Darker: Original Motion Picture Soundtrack =

Fifty Shades Darker (Original Motion Picture Soundtrack)

Soundtrack album by various artists
- Released: February 10, 2017
- Recorded: 2016
- Genres: Electro-R&B; alternative R&B; pop; electropop
- Length: 67:46
- Label: Republic
- Producers: Joseph Angel; Jack Antonoff; The Avener; Chris Braide; SJ Brown; Teemu Brunila; Anderson East; Danny Elfman; Jason Evigan; Steve Fitzmaurice; Frances; Toby Gad; Jason Gill; Grades; Breyan Isaac; C. Knight; Oliver Kraus; Kygo; The Messengers; Jimmy Messer; H. Mills; Jason Quenneville; Corinne Bailey Rae; Aaron Raitere; Mike Riley; The-Dream; Toulouse; Don Was

Singles from Fifty Shades Darker
- 1. "I Don't Wanna Live Forever (Fifty Shades Darker)" Released: December 9, 2016; 2. "Not Afraid Anymore" Released: January 13, 2017; 3. "Helium" Released: January 26, 2018

Fifty Shades Darker (Original Motion Picture Soundtrack) is the soundtrack album to the 2017 film Fifty Shades Darker, an adaptation of E. L. James's novel of the same name. The soundtrack album was released through Republic Records on February 10, 2017. The lead single, "I Don't Wanna Live Forever", was performed by Taylor Swift and Zayn Malik and was released on December 9, 2016. The single was commercially successful, reaching number five on United Kingdom and number two on the Billboard Hot 100. The film's soundtrack was released in two separate versions; one for the 19 popular artists songs used in the film, and another separate release for the original score composed for the film by Danny Elfman. Two of Elfman's themes were also included on the popular artists version of the soundtrack release.

== Singles ==
The lead single "I Don't Wanna Live Forever", a duet between musicians Taylor Swift and Zayn Malik, was released on December 9, 2016. The song peaked at number 2 on the Billboard Hot 100. A music video was released on January 27, 2017. The second official single, "Not Afraid Anymore" by Halsey, was released on January 13, 2017, and reached number 77 on the Hot 100. The album tracks "Bom Bidi Bom" by Nick Jonas and Nicki Minaj and "Helium" by Sia debuted on the Hot 100 at number 54 and 71, respectively. Although not officially singles, the songs have received airplay.

== Track listing ==
Fifty Shades Darker – standard edition
No.	Title	Writer(s)	Producer(s)	Length
1.	"I Don't Wanna Live Forever (Fifty Shades Darker)" (performed by Zayn and Taylor Swift)	Swift; Sam Dew; Jack Antonoff	Antonoff	4:05
2.	"Not Afraid Anymore" (performed by Halsey)	Ashley Frangipane; DaHeala; The Messengers	The Messengers; DaHeala	3:46
3.	"Pray" (performed by JRY featuring Rooty)	H. Mills; Julian Bunetta; C. Knight; John Ryan; Teddy Geiger; Ruth-Anne Cunningham	Odesza	3:20
4.	"Lies in the Dark" (performed by Tove Lo)	Lo; Mike Riley; Grades	Jason Gill; Riley; Grades	3:41
5.	"No Running from Me" (performed by Toulouse)	Toluwanimi Adeyemo	Toulouse	3:11
6.	"One Woman Man" (performed by John Legend)	Toby Gad; John Stephens	Gad	4:04
7.	"Code Blue" (performed by The-Dream)	Tricky Stewart; The-Dream	Stewart; The-Dream	4:45
8.	"Bom Bidi Bom" (performed by Nick Jonas and Nicki Minaj)	Jason Evigan; Breyan Isaac; Marcel Botezan; Sebastian Barac; Onika Miraj	Evigan; Isaac	3:34
9.	"Helium" (performed by Sia)	Sia Furler; Chris Braide	Braide; Oliver Kraus	4:12
10.	"Cruise" (performed by Kygo featuring Andrew Jackson)	Kygo; Andrew Jackson	Kygo	3:44
11.	"The Scientist" (performed by Corinne Bailey Rae)	Coldplay	Corinne Bailey Rae; SJ Brown	3:16
12.	"They Can't Take That Away from Me" (performed by José James)	George Gershwin; Ira Gershwin	Don Was	2:04
13.	"Birthday" (performed by JP Cooper)	Cooper; Teemu Brunila	Brunila	3:23
14.	"I Need a Good One" (performed by The Avener featuring Mark Asari)	The Avener; Mark Asari; Greatness Jones	The Avener	3:48
15.	"Empty Pack of Cigarettes" (performed by Joseph Angel)	Jimmy Messer; Joseph Angel	Messer; Angel	3:51
16.	"What Would It Take" (performed by Anderson East)	Michael Anderson; Aaron Raitere	Anderson East; Raitere	3:59
17.	"What Is Love?" (performed by Frances)	Frances	Steve Fitzmaurice; Frances	4:07
18.	"On His Knees" (performed by Danny Elfman)	Danny Elfman	Elfman	2:50
19.	"Making It Real" (performed by Danny Elfman)	Elfman	Elfman	2:08
Total length:				67:46

Fifty Shades Darker – Target deluxe edition
No.	Title	Writer(s)	Producer(s)	Length
15.	"What Would It Take" (performed by Anderson East)	Anderson; Aaron Raitere	Anderson East; Raitere	3:59
16.	"What Is Love?" (performed by Frances)	Frances	Steve Fitzmaurice; Frances	4:07
17.	"On His Knees" (performed by Danny Elfman)	Danny Elfman	Elfman	2:50
18.	"Making It Real" (performed by Danny Elfman)	Elfman	Elfman	2:08
19.	"Kiss Me" (performed by Rita Ora)	Alan Samspson; Anthony Hannides; Herbie Crichlow; Khaled Rohaim; Michael Hannides	MYKL; Twiceasnice	3:52
20.	"I've Got You Under My Skin" (performed by José James)	Cole Porter	Don Was	3:42
21.	"Living Hand to Mouth" (performed by Little Charlie & the Nightcats)	Rick Estrin		3:20

== Charts ==
The album debuted at No. 1 on the Billboard 200 chart, earning 123,000 equivalent album units in the week ending February 16. Of that sum, 72,000 were in traditional album sales.

=== Weekly charts ===
Chart (2017)	Peak position
Australian Albums (ARIA)	1
Austrian Albums (Ö3 Austria)	1
Belgian Albums (Ultratop Flanders)	4
Belgian Albums (Ultratop Wallonia)	5
Canadian Albums (Billboard)	1
Danish Albums (Hitlisten)	2
Dutch Albums (Album Top 100)	12
Finnish Albums (Suomen virallinen lista)	1
German Albums (Offizielle Top 100)	3
Greek Albums (IFPI)	46
Hungarian Albums (MAHASZ)	11
Italian Compilation Albums (FIMI)	4
Mexican Albums (AMPROFON)	13
New Zealand Albums (RMNZ)	4
Norwegian Albums (VG-lista)	1
Polish Albums (ZPAV)	2
Spanish Albums (PROMUSICAE)	10
Swiss Albums (Schweizer Hitparade)	3
US Billboard 200	1
US Soundtrack Albums (Billboard)	1

=== Year-end charts ===
Chart (2017)	Position
Australian Albums (ARIA)	51
Austrian Albums (Ö3 Austria)	39
Belgian Albums (Ultratop Flanders)	93
Belgian Albums (Ultratop Wallonia)	120
Danish Albums (Hitlisten)	55
German Albums (Offizielle Top 100)	66
Swiss Albums (Schweizer Hitparade)	86
US Billboard 200	69
US Soundtrack Albums (Billboard)	6

Chart (2018)	Position
US Soundtrack Albums (Billboard)	17

== Certifications ==
Region	Certification	Certified units/sales
Australia (ARIA)	Platinum	70,000^{‡}
Brazil (Pro-Música Brasil)	Gold	20,000^{‡}
Denmark (IFPI Danmark)	Platinum	20,000^{‡}
France (SNEP)	Platinum	100,000^{‡}
Germany (BVMI)	Gold	100,000^{‡}
Poland (ZPAV)	Gold	10,000^{‡}
Singapore (RIAS)	Gold	5,000^{*}
United States (RIAA)	Gold	500,000^{‡}
^{*} Sales figures based on certification alone.^{‡} Sales+streaming figures based on certification alone.

== See also ==
- Danny Elfman discography
- List of best-selling albums in China
