= Flames (David Guetta and Sia song) =

Single by David Guetta and Sia

from the album 7
- Released: 22 March 2018
- Recorded: 2017
- Genre: Synth-pop; electropop; house
- Length: 3:15
- Label: What a Music
- Songwriters: Sia Furler; David Guetta; Christopher Braide; Giorgio Tuinfort; Marcus van Wattum
- Producers: David Guetta; Giorgio Tuinfort; Marcus van Wattum

David Guetta singles chronology
"Like I Do" (2018)	"Flames" (2018)	"Your Love" (2018)

Sia singles chronology
"Helium" (2018)	"Flames" (2018)	"Here I Am" (2018)

Music video
- "Flames" on YouTube

"Flames" is a song by French DJ and record producer David Guetta and Australian singer-songwriter Sia. The song was released on 22 March 2018 by What a Music, as the third single from Guetta's seventh studio album, 7 (2018). The duo's seventh collaboration, it was written by Sia, Guetta, Christopher Braide, Giorgio Tuinfort and Marcus van Wattum, with production handled by the latter three.

The single was a commercial success, reaching the top 5 on official charts across Europe, including Scotland, Switzerland and the Netherlands. It also reached the top 10 in the United Kingdom, France and Germany among others, was the most-played song on European radio in 2018, and earned Sia a nomination for Best Female Artist at the ARIA Music Awards of 2018.

== Background ==
"Flames" became the seventh collaboration between Guetta and Sia, after "Titanium", "She Wolf (Falling to Pieces)", "Wild One Two", "Bang My Head", "The Whisperer" and "Helium". In a press release, Guetta opened up about the pair's history and his excitement at the prospect of getting back in the studio with her:

"Titanium" is still one of the tracks I am proudest of and Sia is one of my favorite artists to work with. She's a great songwriter and has an amazing voice. I'm just super excited that we get to release another track together.

== Composition ==
"Flames" is an electropop and house song with elements of dance music. A track with vague '80s influences, it is performed in the key of F minor with a tempo of 94 beats per minute in common time. The chorus of the song follows a progression of Cm–E♭–Fm–D♭, and Sia's vocals span from B♭_{3} to C_{5}.

== Music video ==
A lyric video for "Flames" was released on 22 March 2018. It was directed by Joe Rubinstein.

The official music video for "Flames" was released on 5 April 2018 on Guetta's YouTube channel. This work was directed by Lior Molcho. It emulates 1970s wuxia films and features three women (Lauren Mary Kim, Courtney Chen and Erin Wu) training with their martial arts master (Danny Trejo). The training includes chopping a block of wood, balancing wooden buckets, and catching a fly with chopsticks, but suddenly they are ambushed by a group of ninjas, and the master is killed after he surrendered upon request by a checkmate disciple. The three are then captured and taken to the palace, where they encounter the ruler (Guetta). Then the three break free and fight all the ninjas, but the ruler defeats them by throwing fireballs. The master then reappears in ghostly form, and encourages them to fight back. Eventually, the three defeat the ruler by forcing his fire-casting hands down to his crotch hence burning him to the ground in a rather fatal way, ending with the master watching his disciples' resurgence almost happily.

== Reception ==
The song was well received by music critics. Roisin O'Connor of The Independent said: "The track is classic Sia, starring her incredible voice and a big, emotive chorus; it's an uplifting, low-key banger that shows off the maturity Sia has brought to previous Guetta tracks, along with his talent for an infectious beat." Dean Chalkley of edm.com said: "Once again, Guetta showcases his skills in providing a massive pop-house hybrid ready to take over the radio stations all over the world, offering a perfect foundation to Sia's distinctly powerful and unique voice. With a bit slower tempo, a new pop ballad is just what one could expect from the duo." Mike Nied from Idolator called it "an inspiring anthem complete with a rousing production and another of the 'Chandelier' siren's jaw-dropping vocal lines." Brittany Spanos of Rolling Stone described the song as "uplifting": "On the song, Guetta goes for a less clubby sound than usual. The song is more earnest as Sia offers words of encouragement to a loved one weathering a tough time."

At the ARIA Music Awards of 2018, "Flames" earned Sia a nomination for Best Female Artist.

== Track listing ==
- Digital download
1. "Flames" – 3:15
- Digital download – Acoustic
1. "Flames" (Acoustic) – 3:52
- Digital download – Remixes
1. "Flames" (Robin Schulz Remix) – 3:28
2. "Flames" (Leandro Da Silva Remix) – 5:45
- Digital download – Remixes EP
1. "Flames" (David Guetta Remix) – 6:08
2. "Flames" (Tepr Remix) – 3:52
3. "Flames" (Pink Panda Remix) – 3:48
4. "Flames" (Sylvain Armand Remix) – 4:32
5. "Flames" (Vladimir Cauchemar Remix) – 3:24
6. "Flames" (Extended) – 4:51
- Digital download – Remixes 2 EP
1. "Flames" (Aazar Remix) – 2:52
2. "Flames" (Two Can Remix) – 2:28
3. "Flames" (Tom Martin Remix) – 3:27
4. "Flames" (Igor Blaska Remix) – 4:58
- Digital download – Remixes
1. "Flames" (Extended) – 4:51
2. "Flames" (David Guetta Remix) – 6:08
3. "Flames" (Leandro Da Silva Remix) – 5:45
4. "Flames" (Pink Panda Remix) – 3:48
5. "Flames" (Tepr Remix) – 3:52
6. "Flames" (Robin Schulz Remix) – 3:28
7. "Flames" (Two Can Remix) – 2:28
8. "Flames" (Aazar Remix) – 2:52
9. "Flames" (Sylvain Armand Remix) – 4:32
10. "Flames" (Igor Blaska Remix) – 4:58
11. "Flames" (Vladimir Cauchemar Remix) – 3:24
12. "Flames" (Tom Martin Remix) – 3:27
13. "Flames" (Instrumental) – 3:15

== Charts ==
=== Weekly charts ===
Chart (2018)	Peak position
Argentina (Argentina Hot 100)	79
Australia (ARIA)	19
Austria (Ö3 Austria Top 40)	7
Belarus Airplay (Eurofest)	1
Belgium (Ultratop 50 Flanders)	7
Belgium (Ultratop 50 Wallonia)	3
Brazil (Crowley Charts)	80
Canada Hot 100 (Billboard)	66
Canada AC (Billboard)	21
Colombia (National-Report)	75
Croatia (HRT)	6
Czech Republic Airplay (ČNS IFPI)	1
Czech Republic Singles Digital (ČNS IFPI)	6
Denmark (Tracklisten)	40
Ecuador (National-Report)	18
Finland (Suomen virallinen lista)	6
France (SNEP)	10
Germany (GfK)	7
Germany Dance (Official German Charts)	1
Hungary (Dance Top 40)	6
Hungary (Rádiós Top 40)	1
Hungary (Single Top 40)	1
Hungary (Stream Top 40)	3
Ireland (IRMA)	15
Israel (Media Forest)	9
Italy (FIMI)	11
Lebanon (Lebanese Top 20)	5
Luxembourg Digital Songs (Billboard)	1
Mexico (Billboard Mexican Airplay)	4
Netherlands (Dutch Top 40)	2
Netherlands (Single Top 100)	4
New Zealand Heatseekers (RMNZ)	3
Norway (VG-lista)	1
Poland Airplay (ZPAV)	1
Poland Dance (ZPAV)	8
Portugal (AFP)	16
Romania (Airplay 100)	6
Russia Airplay (Tophit)	1
Scottish Singles Sales (Official Charts)	2
Singapore (RIAS)	23
Slovakia Airplay (ČNS IFPI)	1
Slovakia Singles Digital (ČNS IFPI)	9
Slovenia (SloTop50)	1
Spain (Promusicae)	38
Sweden (Sverigetopplistan)	9
Switzerland (Schweizer Hitparade)	2
Switzerland (Media Control Romandy)	1
UK Singles (Official Charts)	7
Ukraine Airplay (Tophit)	4
US Dance Club Songs (Billboard)	4
US Hot Dance/Electronic Songs (Billboard)	9
Venezuela Anglo (Record Report)	4

=== Year-end charts ===
Chart (2018)	Position
Argentina (Monitor Latino)	57
Austria (Ö3 Austria Top 40)	31
Belgium (Ultratop Flanders)	30
Belgium (Ultratop Wallonia)	15
CIS (Tophit)	4
France (SNEP)	30
Germany (Official German Charts)	22
Hungary (Dance Top 40)	31
Hungary (Rádiós Top 40)	11
Hungary (Single Top 40)	9
Hungary (Stream Top 40)	21
Iceland (Plötutíóindi)	13
Italy (FIMI)	33
Netherlands (Dutch Top 40)	2
Netherlands (Single Top 100)	28
Poland (ZPAV)	19
Portugal (AFP)	60
Romania (Airplay 100)	43
Russia Airplay (Tophit)	6
Slovenia (SloTop50)	11
Spain (PROMUSICAE)	86
Sweden (Sverigetopplistan)	25
Switzerland (Schweizer Hitparade)	12
Ukraine Airplay (Tophit)	19
UK Singles (Official Charts Company)	50
US Hot Dance/Electronic Songs (Billboard)	28
Chart (2019)	Position
Hungary (Rádiós Top 40)	40

== Certifications ==
Region	Certification	Certified units/sales
Australia (ARIA)	2× Platinum	140,000^{‡}
Austria (IFPI Austria)	Platinum	30,000^{‡}
Belgium (BRMA)	Gold	10,000^{‡}
Canada (Music Canada)	Platinum	80,000^{‡}
Denmark (IFPI Danmark)	Platinum	90,000^{‡}
France (SNEP)	Diamond	333,333^{‡}
Germany (BVMI)	Platinum	400,000^{‡}
Italy (FIMI)	2× Platinum	100,000^{‡}
New Zealand (RMNZ)	Platinum	30,000^{‡}
Norway (IFPI Norway)	2× Platinum	120,000^{‡}
Poland (ZPAV)	4× Platinum	200,000^{‡}
Portugal (AFP)	Platinum	10,000^{‡}
Spain (Promusicae)	2× Platinum	120,000^{‡}
Switzerland (IFPI Switzerland)	Gold	10,000^{‡}
United Kingdom (BPI)	2× Platinum	1,200,000^{‡}
^{‡} Sales+streaming figures based on certification alone.

== Release history ==
Region	Date	Format	Version	Label	Ref.
Various	22 March 2018	Digital download	Original	What a Music	
Australia	23 March 2018	Contemporary hit radio	Original	Warner Music Australia	
Italy	23 March 2018	Contemporary hit radio	Original	Warner	
Various	20 April 2018	Digital download	Remixes (Part 1)	What a Music	
Various	20 April 2018	Digital download	Remixes EP	What a Music	
Various	11 May 2018	Digital download	Remixes (Part 2)	What a Music	
Various	25 May 2018	Digital download	Remixes 2 EP	What a Music	
United States	11 June 2018	Hot adult contemporary radio	Original	Big Beat; Atlantic	
United States	12 June 2018	Contemporary hit radio	Original	Big Beat; Atlantic	
Various	23 June 2018	Digital download	Acoustic	What a Music	
