= Lullaby (R3hab song) =

2018 song by R3hab feat. Mike Williams

Single by R3hab and Mike Williams

from the album The Wave
- Released: January 26, 2018
- Genre: Future bounce, electro house, EDM
- Length: 2:40
- Label: R3hab Music; Cyb3rpvnk
- Songwriters: Mike Williams; R3hab; Victor Thell; Maria Jane Smith; Smith & Thell; Seann Bowe; Ferruccio Tebaldi; Aleksandr Dukhov
- Producers: R3hab; Mike Williams

R3hab singles chronology
"Ain't That Why" (2017)	"Lullaby" (2018)	"The Wave" (2018)

"Lullaby" is a song by Dutch-Moroccan DJ and record producer R3hab and Dutch DJ and record producer Mike Williams, released by R3hab Music and Cyb3rpvnk on 26 January 2018. The song has 200 million streams on Spotify as of December 16, 2022, and has achieved eight gold and four platinum certifications worldwide. It also reached the top 10 in Norway and charted in Sweden, as well as appearing on the US Billboard Hot Dance/Electronic Songs chart.

== Background ==
Speaking about the song, R3hab said:

"Mike is a talented guy and it's great to see his career taking off. We had the same vision for this record from the beginning, which made the production process exciting and smooth. The record has a smooth, dreamy sound and pulsating beat that has become a staple in my sets recently. I hope this record takes you on a journey as it has for us."

Mike Williams added:

"I'm really excited to release this edit of one of my masterpieces. Working with R3HAB is always a lot of fun! I'm blown away by people singing along to this track during my live shows. I hope everyone loves this version."

== Charts ==
Weekly chart performance for "Lullaby"
Chart (2018)	Peak position
Norway (VG-lista)	7
Sweden (Sverigetopplistan)	66
US Hot Dance/Electronic Songs (Billboard)	27

== Certifications ==
Region	Certification	Certified units/sales
Denmark (IFPI Danmark)	Gold	45,000^{‡}
Norway (IFPI Norway)	Gold	30,000^{‡}
Streaming
Sweden (GLF)	Gold	4,000,000^{†}
^{‡} Sales+streaming figures based on certification alone.^{†} Streaming-only figures based on certification alone.
