= Feather (American musician) =

American electronic dance music producer

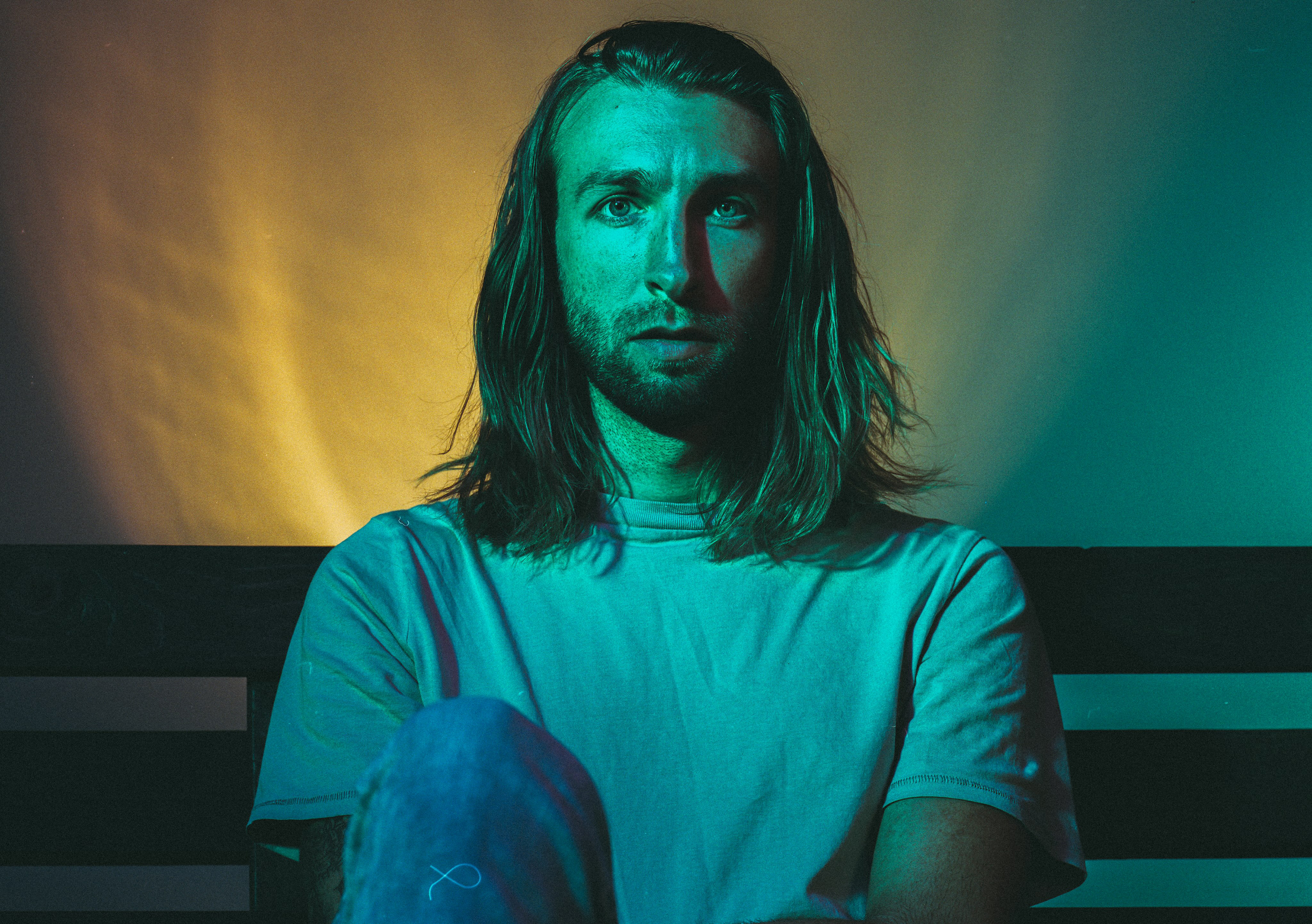

Background information
- Birth name: Kyle Featherstone
- Born: June 27, 1991 (age 33)
- Origin: Minneapolis, Minnesota, U.S.
- Genres: Future bass; electropop; EDM
- Occupations: Musician; record producer; singer
- Instruments: Digital audio workstation; guitar; piano; drums; vocals
- Years active: 2018–present
- Website: featherofficial.com

Kyle Featherstone (born June 27, 1991), known professionally as Feather, is an American electronic dance music producer.

== Early life ==
Kyle Featherstone was born in Minneapolis, Minnesota and grew up in Hudson, Wisconsin. Growing up he always loved music and when he was in 3rd grade he started playing the piano. He began singing in his high school choir after auditioning for the musical at his school. After graduating from Hudson High School, he moved to Madison, Wisconsin where he went to the University of Wisconsin Madison. Featherstone began playing in bands inspired by Coldplay, Jack's Mannequin, and Augustana when he was a sophomore in college. In 2016 left his touring band & moved back to Minneapolis, where he started working on producing electronic music.

== Career ==
Featherstone started releasing remixes while working on his own original music. In June 2018, he released his first remix for Lauv's song "I Like Me Better" through the YouTube channel Proximity. Ben Allen of ElectroJams reviewed the track saying "In a style reminiscent of an Odesza/Autograf lovechild, Feather infuses the year-old Lauv track with a wash of synths, accented by beefed-up percussion, culminating in cinematic builds and drops".

He released a remix for Timeflies song "Little Bit" on August 10, 2018. One week later, a remix of Loote's song "Wish I Never Met You" was released through Island Records. In 2019, Featherstone remixed Trove's "GTFO", which was released through disco:wax records.

Featherstone released the debut single of his original music, "Safe House", on October 28, 2020. He released his follow up single "Smoke" on December 9, 2020, which was a collaboration with artist Lostboycrow.

He released his debut EP "Becoming" on January 13, 2020. Dancing Astronaut reviewed the EP saying "Becoming is a well-rounded body of work that wholly substantiates Feather’s production dexterity".

On March 5, 2020, Don Diablo, John K, and JLV released the song "Problems", which was written by Featherstone.

He uses Bitwig Studio, Logic Pro, and Ableton to produce his music.

== Discography ==
=== Releases ===
Year	Title	Artist	Album	Label
2020	"Safe House"	Feather	Becoming	Feather
2020	"Smoke (with Lostboycrow)"	Feather	Becoming	Feather
2021	"Where Are You"	Feather	Becoming	Feather
2021	"Rise (feat. Kait Weston)"	Feather	Becoming	Feather
2021	"Keys (feat. Steven K)"	Feather	Becoming	Feather
2021	"Keys - Feather VIP Remix"	Feather	Becoming (Remixes)	Feather
2021	"Keys - Badnights Remix"	Feather, Badnights	Becoming (Remixes)	Feather
2021	"Smoke (with Lostboycrow) - Lumasi Remix"	Feather, Lumasi	Becoming (Remixes)	Feather
2021	"Smoke (with Lostboycrow) - Joel Freck Remix"	Feather, Joel Freck	Becoming (Remixes)	Feather
2021	"Where Are You - Juuku Remix"	Feather, Juuku	Becoming (Remixes)	Feather
2021	"Where Are You - Svble Remix"	Feather, Svble	Becoming (Remixes)	Feather
2021	"Rise - Artm Remix"	Feather, Artm	Becoming (Remixes)	Feather
2021	"Safe House - SWAAMP Remix"	Feather, SWAAMP	Becoming (Remixes)	Feather
2021	"Wasted Time"	Feather, Badnights	Wasted Time	Feather

=== Remixes ===
Year	Title	Artist	Label
2018	"I Like Me Better"	Lauv	–
2018	"Little Bit"	Timeflies	AWAL
2018	"Wish I Never Met You"	Loote	Island Records
2019	"GTFO"	Trove	disco:wax
2021	"Murder"	Mako	Ultra Music
2021	"Breathless"	Slow Magic & RUNN	Moving Castle
2021	"Beneath Us"	Juuku	Moving Castle
2021	"Memory"	Kane Brown & Blackbear	RCA Records
