= Mad Love (Sean Paul and David Guetta song) =

2018 single by Sean Paul and David Guetta featuring Becky G

Single by Sean Paul and David Guetta featuring Becky G

from the EP Mad Love the Prequel
- Released: February 16, 2018
- Recorded: 2017
- Genre: Dance-pop; EDM; dancehall
- Length: 3:19
- Label: Island
- Songwriters: Sean Paul Henriques; Majasty Jones; Pierre David Guetta; Emily Warren; Shakira Ripoll; Jack Patterson; Rosina Russell; Giorgio Tuinfort; Ina Wroldsen; Raoul Lionel Chen
- Producers: David Guetta; Jack Patterson; Jason Jigzagula Henriques; Giorgio Tuinfort; Banx & Ranx; 1st Klase

Sean Paul singles chronology
"She Call Me" (2017)	"Mad Love" (2018)	"Tip Pon It" (2018)

David Guetta singles chronology
"Helium" (2018)	"Mad Love" (2018)	"Like I Do" (2018)

Becky G singles chronology
"Mi Mala (Remix)" (2018)	"Mad Love" (2018)	"Ya Es Hora" (2018)

Music video
- "Mad Love" on YouTube

"Mad Love" is a song recorded by Jamaican rapper Sean Paul and French music producer David Guetta, featuring guest vocals from American singer Becky G. It was written by Shakira, Paul, Guetta, Majasty Jones, Emily Warren, Rosina Russell, Ina Wroldsen, Raoul Lionel Chen, Jack Patterson and Giorgio Tuinfort, with production handled by Guetta, Patterson, Tuinfort, Jason Jigzagula Henriques, Banx & Ranx and 1st Klase. The song was released via Island Records on February 16, 2018, as the fourth single from Paul's EP Mad Love the Prequel.

== Background ==
The song was first revealed in June 2017 by Islands label singer-songwriter Majasty Jones. It initially featured Colombian singer Shakira instead of Becky G. Speaking about the song, Sean Paul explained: "I got something kind of more poppy coming in a little while, with Shakira. The song's called 'Mad Love', it's about being mad and having love, it's more sexy. It's not about love, it's the sexiness." Paul later revealed in an interview with Billboard in August 2017 that the song was intended to be titled "Temple".

Paul said of the song in a press release: "I've been working on this record for a long time. It was a pleasure to work with David Guetta and his team as we got the production to the perfect sound. It was also great to work with Becky G and her team. Nuff love to all of them! The song is full of energy and I can't wait for people to hear it!" Guetta added that they spent two years working on the song, and he is grateful that it was finally getting released. He is proud of the track, praising Paul for his "unique style" and Gomez for her vocals, which "just make everything come together". Gomez declared that she appreciates the opportunity to work with "an icon like Sean". She regarded "Mad Love" as a song that "brings people together" and "give[s] you the energy you need to get up and get on the dance floor".

== Critical reception ==
Xavier Hamilton of Vibe wrote that the song manages to "embody every aspect of a modern pop record" and "add to all of the artists' cross-cultural popularity". Rap-Up called it an "island-flavored collaboration" and a "dance floor-ready track". Chantilly Post of HotNewHipHop deemed it "a pop, radio-friendly track", writing "David provides a bouncy EDM beat that hears Becky and Sean sing about vibing and hitting it off to the 'tempo' of a song."

== Credits and personnel ==
Credits adapted from Tidal.

- Sean Paul – composition, vocals
- David Guetta – composition, production
- Shakira – composition, production
- Becky G – vocals
- Emily Warren – composition
- Jack Patterson – composition, production
- Rosina Russell – composition
- Giorgio Tuinfort – composition, production
- Ina Wroldsen – composition
- Raoul Lionel Chen – composition
- Jason Jigzagula Henriques – production
- Banx & Ranx – production
- 1st Klase – production
- Chris Athens – master engineering
- Zacharie Raymond – bass guitar, background vocals, drums, programming, synthesizer
- Yannick Rastogi – bass guitar, background vocals, drums, programming, synthesizer
- Serban Ghenea – mixing

== Charts ==
=== Weekly charts ===
Chart (2018)	Peak position
Austria (Ö3 Austria Top 40)	33
Belgium (Ultratip Bubbling Under Flanders)	27
Belgium (Ultratop 50 Wallonia)	30
Bolivia (Monitor Latino)	11
Canada Hot 100 (Billboard)	71
Colombia (National-Report)	79
Croatia (HRT)	48
Czech Republic Airplay (ČNS IFPI)	56
Czech Republic Singles Digital (ČNS IFPI)	30
Ecuador (National-Report)	55
Finland (Suomen virallinen lista)	9
France (SNEP)	33
Germany (GfK)	10
Greece (IFPI)	64
Guatemala (Monitor Latino)	18
Hungary (Dance Top 40)	21
Hungary (Rádiós Top 40)	2
Hungary (Single Top 40)	12
Hungary (Stream Top 40)	10
Ireland (IRMA)	35
Italy (FIMI)	63
Mexico Airplay (Billboard)	40
Mexico Ingles Airplay (Billboard)	41
Netherlands (Dutch Top 40)	10
Netherlands (Single Top 100)	23
Norway (VG-lista)	20
Poland Airplay (ZPAV)	10
Poland Dance (ZPAV)	5
Portugal (AFP)	57
Romania (Airplay 100)	10
Scottish Singles Sales (Official Charts)	21
Slovakia Singles Digital (ČNS IFPI)	11
Spain (Promusicae)	43
Sweden Heatseeker (Sverigetopplistan)	4
Switzerland (Schweizer Hitparade)	36
UK Singles (Official Charts)	22
US Hot Dance/Electronic Songs (Billboard)	7
Venezuela (National-Report)	48

=== Year-end charts ===
Chart (2018)	Position
France (SNEP)	117
Germany (Official German Charts)	62
Hungary (Dance Top 40)	55
Hungary (Rádiós Top 40)	31
Iceland (Plötutíóindi)	90
Netherlands (Dutch Top 40)	45
Netherlands (Single Top 100)	85
Poland (ZPAV)	45
Portugal Full Track Download (AFP)	155
Romania (Airplay 100)	36
Spain (PROMUSICAE)	94
US Hot Dance/Electronic Songs (Billboard)	31
Chart (2019)	Position
Hungary (Rádiós Top 40)	33

== Certifications ==
Region	Certification	Certified units/sales
Brazil (Pro-Música Brasil)	2× Platinum	80,000^{‡}
Canada (Music Canada)	Platinum	80,000^{‡}
Denmark (IFPI Danmark)	Gold	45,000^{‡}
France (SNEP)	Platinum	200,000^{‡}
Germany (BVMI)	Gold	200,000^{‡}
Italy (FIMI)	Platinum	50,000^{‡}
Poland (ZPAV)	2× Platinum	40,000^{‡}
Spain (Promusicae)	Platinum	40,000^{‡}
United Kingdom (BPI)	Gold	400,000^{‡}
^{‡} Sales+streaming figures based on certification alone.

== Release history ==
Region	Date	Format	Label	Ref.
Various	16 February 2018	Digital download; streaming	Island	
United States	20 February 2018	Rhythmic contemporary radio	Island; Republic	
Italy	16 March 2018	Contemporary hit radio	Universal	
