= Phil Greiss =

Canadian record producer and songwriter

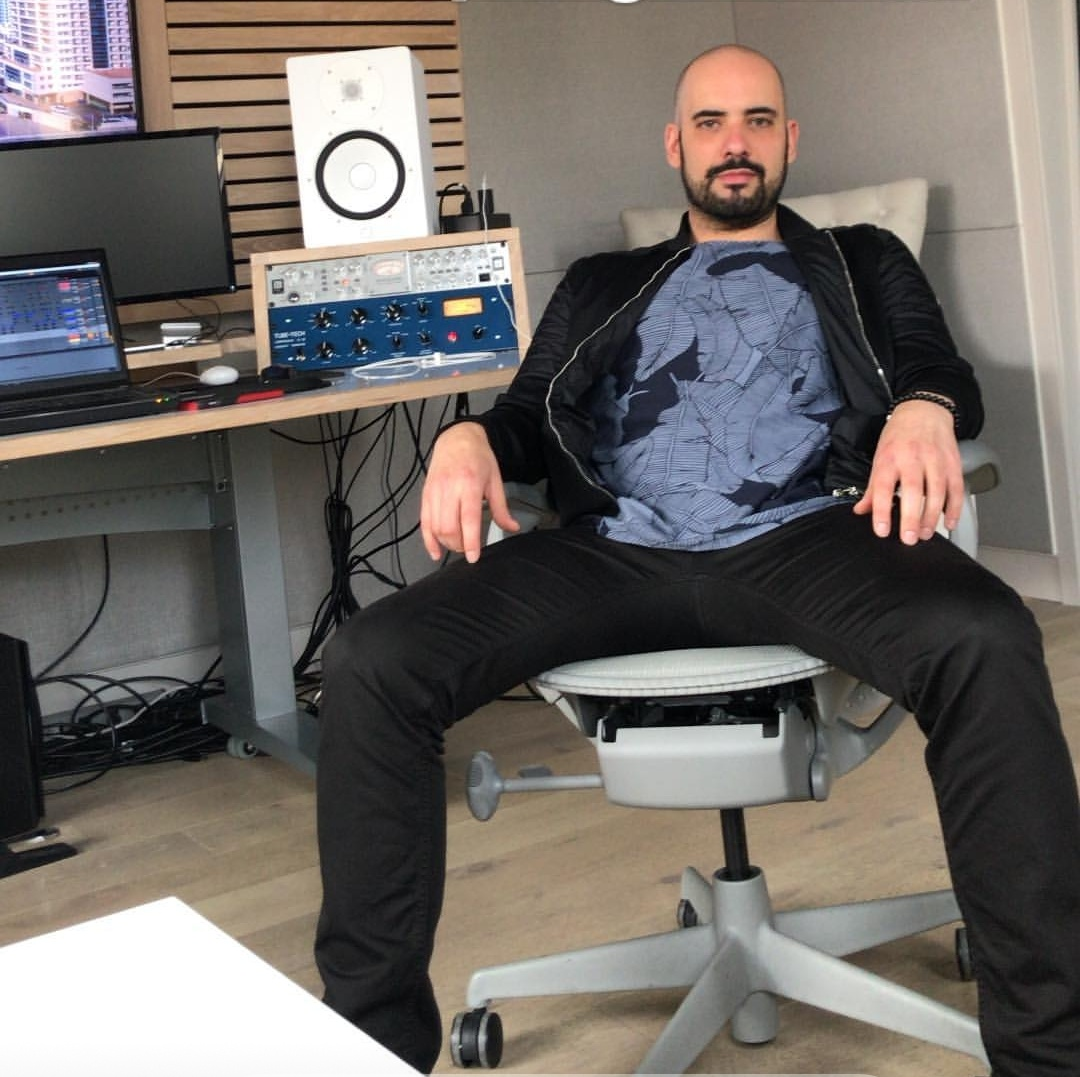
- Greiss in his studio, April 2019

Background information
- Also known as: Phil Greiss
- Born: Philippe Greiss; Meaux, France
- Genres: Pop; R&B; hip hop soul; Latin
- Occupations: Record producer; songwriter; vocal producer; mixer
- Years active: 1996–present

Philippe Greiss (known professionally as Phil Greiss) is a French & Canadian record producer, songwriter, vocal producer, multi-instrumentalist & mix engineer. Greiss's recent work includes production for artists Jason Derulo, J Balvin, Nicki Minaj, Alok, David Guetta, BTS, Will I Am, Beyoncé, Willy William, and Farina

Greiss is a 2021 ASCAP Pop Award winner for his work on Jason Derulo's “Savage Love” (2 times RIAA Platinum, #1 Billboard Hot 100, #1 Billboard Global 200, #1 Global Spotify, #1 iTunes Worldwide). He was nominated for "Record Of The Year" and "Album Of The Year" during the 2018 Latin Grammy Awards for his work on the song Mi Gente (68× RIAA Platinum) featured on J Balvin's album Vibras (Latin Grammy Award for Best Urban Music Album and 8× RIAA Platinum). Greiss also received a BRITT Gold Certification for his work on David Guetta's "Goodbye" (feat. Nicki Minaj & Jason Derulo) as well as an RIAA Gold certification for his work on David Guetta's album "7"

== Career ==
Greiss crafted chart topping albums and songs in France in the 2000s and 2010s such as Corneille's “Parce qu'on vient de loin" and DIMA by Zaho. In 2017, Greiss co-produced & mixed Willy William's “Voodoo Song” which subsequently became the international hit “Mi Gente” with J Balvin. This success led to Greiss producing David Guetta & Jason Derulo's 2018 single "Goodbye"(feat Nicky Minaj). In 2019, he produced "Perras Como Tú (Ft. Tokischa)" for Latin rising star Farina, which was featured in Paramount Picture's "Miss Bala". The last few years brought more opportunities for Greiss, who co-wrote and co-produced Jason Derulo's “Savage Love”. He recently produced Alok's “TU” and collaborated on "Metele Al Perreo" by Daddy Yankee.

== Production Discography (U.S & International) ==
| Year | Artist | Album | Song | Songwriter | Producer | Mixer | Peak position | Awards & Nominations |
|---|---|---|---|---|---|---|---|---|
| 2017 | J Balvin & Willy William | Vibras | Mi Gente | | check | check | #1 Global Spotify #2 US Hot Latin Songs (Billboard) #3 US Billboard Hot 100 #5 UK Singles (OCC) #9 US Latin Airplay (Billboard) | US RIAA 68xPlatinum (Single) Latin Grammy - Best Urban Music Album 2019 (award) Latin Grammy - Song Of The Year 2019 (nomination) Latin Grammy - Album Of The Year 2019 (nomination) US RIAA 8× platinum (Album) FR SNEP Diamond UK BPI 2× Platinum |
| 2018 | Kylie Minogue | Golden | Dancing | | | check | #37 US Hot Dance Club Songs (Billboard) | |
| 2018 | Jason Derulo & David Guetta ft. Nicky Minaj & Willy William | 7 | Goodbye | check | check | check | #7 US Bubbling Under Hot 100 Singles (Billboard) #9 US Hot Dance/Electronic Songs (Billboard) #24 US Rhythmic (Billboard) #26 US Mainstream Top 40 (Billboard) #26 UK Singles (OCC) | US - RIAA Gold (Album) UK - BPI Gold FR - SNEP Gold |
| 2019 | Fariana & Tokischa | | Perras Como Tú | check | check | check | | |
| 2020 | Jason Derulo & Jawsh685 | | Savage Love | check | check | | #1 US Billboard Hot 100 #1 US Billboard Hot 200 #1 UK Singles (OCC) #1 Global Spotify #6 FR (SNEP) | ASCAP Pop Music Award 2021 US - RIAA 3× Platinum FR - SNEP Platinum UK - BPI 2× Platinum |
| 2021 | Alok | | Tú | check | check | check | #7 iTunes Brasil #11 Apple Music Brasil | |
| 2021 | Daddy Yankee | | Métele Al Perreo | | | check | #1 MEX #43 US Latin | US - RIAA: Gold (Latin) |
| 2022 | Will.I.Am, Lali & Willy William | | Solo | | check | check | | |
| 2022 | Poolfire | | Radio Man,Ugly Friends, Serotonin Pockets | | check | check | | |
| 2024 | Moby | Always Centered At Night | We're Going Wrong Medusa | | | check | | |
| 2024 | Ofenbach | | Over You | check | | | | |
| 2025 | David Guetta, Nicky Jam, Willy William | | Cuenta Le | check | check | check | | |
| 2026 | Jason Derulo | The Last Dance | Sexy For Me DELETE | check | check | check | | |

== Production Discography (France & Europe) ==
Selected Discography

| Year | Artist | Album | Title | Songwriter | Producer | Mixer |
|---|---|---|---|---|---|---|
| 1997 | Jodie Resther et LMDS | | La belle histoire | | check | |
| 1997 | LMDS | LMDS | (Album) | check | check | |
| 1999 | LMDS | Il faudrait leur dire | (Album) | check | check | check |
| 1999 | LMDS | | Le bien de demain | check | check | |
| 2000 | Artistes Variés | L'hip-hopée | Quand les hommes vivront d'amour | | check | |
| 2000 | Mario Pelchat | VII | Les cèdres du Liban, Un enfant, Je n't'aime plus, Je dois vivre, Te parler de ma vie, Je m'ennuie de toi, | check | check | |
| 2001 | Dubmatique | Influences | Ragga Dub, Comptes sur moi, Selon sa volonté | | check | check |
| 2002 | Corneille | Parce-qu'on vient de loin | (Album) | | check | check |
| 2003 | Andrée Watters | A.W | Si exceptionnelle, Dépendre de toi | | | check |
| 2004 | Mario Pelchat | Christmas with Jireh gospel choir | (Album) | | check | |
| 2004 | Corneille | | Chanter qu'on les aime | | | check |
| 2005 | La Fouine | Bourré au son | Basta | check | check | |
| 2005 | Zaho | | Hey Papi | check | check | check |
| 2005 | Gage | Soul rebel | Trop fresh, Pense à moi, Je t'aime quand même, Demain, L'homme d'une femme, Viens me voir, Dis moi | | check | check |
| 2006 | Shy'm | | Femme de couleur | | | check |
| 2006 | Cheb Mami | Layali | Halili | | check | |
| 2006 | Humphrey | Humphrey | (Album) | | check | check |
| 2007 | Neiman | Destiny | (Album) | | | check |
| 2007 | Don Choa | Jungle de béton | Lune de miel | check | check | |
| 2007 | Idir | La France des couleurs | La France des couleurs, Tout ce temps | check | check | check |
| 2008 | Tunisiano | Le regard des gens | Citoyen du monde | | check | |
| 2008 | Sans Pression | La tendance se maintient | (Album) | | | check |
| 2008 | Lynsha | | Désolée | check | check | |
| 2008 | Zaho | Dima | C'est chelou | check | check | check |
| 2008 | Zaho | Dima | (Album) | check | check | check |
| 2008 | Zaho | Dima | La roue tourne | check | check | check |
| 2008 | Zaho | Dima | Kif'n'dir | check | check | check |
| 2009 | Zaho | Dima | Je te promets | check | check | check |
| 2009 | Alonzo | Banlieu 13 | Déterminé | | | check |
| 2010 | Rohff | La cuenta | Fais doucement | | check | check |
| 2010 | Justin Nozuka | | Heartless (feat. Zaho) | | check | check |
| 2010 | Sean Paul | | Hold my hand (feat. Zaho) | | check | check |
| 2011 | Christophe Willem | Prismophonic | Indélébile | check | check | check |
| 2012 | Zaho | Contagieuse | (Album) | check | check | check |
| 2013 | Karim Ouellet | Fox | L'amour, Marie Jo | | | check |
| 2013 | La Fouine | Drôle De Parcours | Ma meilleure feat. Zaho | | check | |
| 2014 | Nancy Logan | | Femme du monde, C'est quoi ton problème, C'est trop, Pas l'temps | | check | check |
| 2015 | Sarah Riani | Dark-en-ciel | (EP) | | check | check |
| 2015 | David Carreira | 3 | (Album) | | | check |
| 2015 | Sultan | | Piqué | | | check |
| 2015 | GIMS | Mon cœur avait raison | Sapés comme jamais, Loin, Le Barillet, Mayweather, Sans rétro, Mélynda Gates, MCAR, Uzi | | | check |
| 2016 | Mickael Carreira | | Sinto Muito, Deixa que eu vois | | | check |
| 2016 | La Fouine | Nouveau monde | | | | check |
| 2016 | The Shin Sekaï | | Aimes-moi demain | | | check |
| 2016 | Kendji Girac | Ensemble | Ou va le monde | | | check |
| 2016 | Lefa | Monsieur Fall | (Album) | | | check |
| 2017 | Outasight | Richie | Still Young | check | check | check |
| 2017 | Y'akoto | Mermaid Blues | Reception | check | check | check |
| 2018 | David Carreira | 7 | (Album) | | | check |
| 2018 | Vianney | | Fils à papa (remix) | | | check |
| 2018 | GIMS - Vianney | | La même | | | check |
| 2021 | Oryane feat. Jillionaire | | Andale | | check | check |
| 2021 | Les Twins | | Stranger | | check | check |
| 2021 | Willy William | | Good Vibes | | | check |

== Awards & Nominations (France & Europe) ==
| Année | Artist | Album | Title | Awards & Nominations |
|---|---|---|---|---|
| 1997 | Jodie Resther et LMDS | | La belle histoire | #1 B.D.S Radio Airplay |
| 1997 | LMDS | LMDS | (Album) | ADISQ Hip Hop album of the year nomination |
| 2000 | LMDS | Il faudrait leur dire | (Album) | ADISQ Hip Hop album of the year 2000 nomination |
| 2000 | LMDS | | Le bien de demain | SOCAN Hip Hop song of the year award |
| 2000 | Mario Pelchat | VII | Les cèdres du Liban, Un enfant, Je n't'aime plus, Je dois vivre, Te parler de ma vie, Je m'ennuie de toi | CRIA Gold ADISQ Pop song of the year 2000 ADISQ Pop album of the year (nomination) |
| 2002 | Corneille | Parce-qu'on vient de loin | (Album) | #3 ultratop #4 SNEP SNEP diamond CRIA Platinum |
| 2003 | Andrée Waters | A.W | Si exceptionnelle, Dépendre de toi | CRIA Gold ADISQ Rock album 2004 |
| 2004 | Mario Pelchat | Christmas with Jireh gospel choir | (Album) | CRIA Platinum ADISQ Pop album 2005 (nomination) |
| 2005 | Gage | Soul rebel | Trop fresh, Pense à moi, Je t'aime quand même, Demain, L'homme d'une femme, Viens me voir, Dis moi | SNEP Gold ADISQ mix of the year 2006 (nomination) |
| 2008 | Tunisiano | Le regard des gens | Citoyen du monde | SNEP Gold |
| 2008 | Zaho | Dima | C'est chelou | #1 radio airplay january 2008 #2 SNEP Victoire de la musique 2009: video of the year (nomination) SNEP Gold NRJ Music Awards 2009: Video of the year (nomination) |
| 2008 | Zaho | Dima | (Album) | SNEP Platinum MTV Europe music awards 2008: French artist of the year NRJ Music Awards:Breakthrough Artist 2009 NRJ Music Awards: Female Artist 2010 (nomination) |
| 2008 | Zaho | Dima | La roue tourne | #1 radio airplay july 2008 #15 SNEP NRJ Music Awards - Video Of The Year (Nomination) |
| 2008 | Zaho | Dima | Kif'n'dir | #33 SNEP #1 video airplay (tv) #5 SNEP downloads |
| 2010 | Justin Nozuka | | Heartless (feat. Zaho) | NRJ Music Awards: Duet 2009 |
| 2010 | Sean Paul | | Hold my hand (feat. Zaho) | Prix de la création 2011 International Song of The Year |
| 2011 | Christophe Willem | Prismophonic | Indélébile | SNEP Platinum |
| 2012 | Zaho | Contagieuse | (Album) | SNEP Gold NRJ Music Award - French Artist Of The Year (Nomination) Trace Urban Award : Artist Of The Year 2013 CSDEM Song of the year 2014(Tourner la page) |
| 2013 | La Fouine | Drôle De Parcours | Ma meilleure feat. Zaho | Trace Urban Awards: Best collaboration/duet 2013 |
| 2015 | GIMS | Mon cœur avait raison | Sapés comme jamais, Loin, Le Barillet, Mayweather, Sans rétro, Mélynda Gates, MCAR, Uzi | SNEP – Diamond #1 SNEP streaming #3 SNEP radio SNEP Diamond Victoire de la musique - Song of the year 2016 SNEP Platinum Loin - #1 radio airplay - (belgium) GOLD - (germany) |
| 2016 | Kendji Girak | Ensemble | Ou va le monde | SNEP 2× Diamond Platinum (belgium) |
| 2016 | Lefa | Monsieur Fall | (Album) | SNEP Gold |
| 2018 | GIMS - Vianney | | La même | SNEP Diamond |
