= Like I Do (David Guetta, Martin Garrix and Brooks song) =

Single by David Guetta, Martin Garrix and Brooks

from the album 7
- Released: 22 February 2018
- Genre: EDM; big room house
- Length: 3:22
- Label: What a Music
- Songwriters: David Guetta; Martijn Garritsen; Thijs Westbroek; Talay Riley; Giorgio Tuinfort; Sean Douglas; Nick Seeley; Robert Bergin
- Producers: David Guetta; Martin Garrix; Brooks; Giorgio Tuinfort

David Guetta singles chronology
"Mad Love" (2018)	"Like I Do" (2018)	"Flames" (2018)

Martin Garrix singles chronology
"So Far Away" (2017)	"Like I Do" (2018)	"Game Over" (2018)

Brooks singles chronology
"Boomerang" (2017)	"Like I Do" (2018)	"Lynx" (2018)

"Like I Do" is a song by French DJ and record producer David Guetta and Dutch DJs and record producers Martin Garrix and Brooks. Written by Talay Riley, Sean Douglas, Nick Seeley, Robert Bergin and its producers Guetta, Garrix, Brooks and Giorgio Tuinfort, it was released on 22 February 2018 by What a Music, as the second single from Guetta's seventh studio album, 7 (2018).

== Background ==
Guetta said of the song: "When we hit the studio we were already working on several tracks. After we saw the great response on 'So Far Away' we thought f*** it, we will release another track together straight away." Garrix added: "David is a legend. I have a lot of respect for him as an artist and I'm very happy we were able to release another track together with the amazing Brooks who I have worked with on other records before. I think he's one of the most talented producers out there."

== Release and promotion ==
Garrix originally premiered the song during his TimeOut72 Festival set in Goa, India. On 14 February 2018, Guetta and Brooks released a teaser of the song on social media, revealing its release date. A remix contest for the song was held in association with the app Soonvibes, winners were selected as part of the official remixes.

== Composition ==
"Like I Do" is a big room house and EDM track, with vocals provided by Talay Riley. It blends elements from future bounce and pop with "heavy bass and a dancefloor-ready beat". On the opening lines, the voice rises "over shimmering synths and a fizzing production", before building up into "an earworm-worthy chorus". According to Billboard's Kat Bein, the song is "a stomping mix of horns and bass that's funky".

== Critical reception ==
In a positive review, a Your EDM contributor regarded the song as "a wonderfully melodic new release that's a surefire radio hit with an EDM-friendly drop that Garrix and Brooks fans will both appreciate". Mike Nied of Idolator called the collaboration "refreshing", deeming the song "a blending of all their respective sounds".

== Track listing ==
- Digital download
1. "Like I Do" – 3:22
- Digital download – remixes
1. "Like I Do" (Dasko & Agrero remix) – 2:58
2. "Like I Do" (Upsilone remix) – 2:50
3. "Like I Do" (Jumpexx remix) – 4:07
4. "Like I Do" (Foxa and Conor Ross remix) – 3:43
5. "Like I Do" (Edson Faiolli remix) – 5:10

== Credits and personnel ==
Credits adapted from Tidal.

- David Guetta – composition, production, programming
- Martin Garrix – composition, production, programming
- Brooks – composition, production, master engineering, mixing, programming
- Talay Riley – composition, background vocals
- Giorgio Tuinfort – composition, production, programming
- Sean Douglas – composition
- Nick Seeley – composition, keyboard
- Robert Bergin – composition
- The Pianoman – talk box

== Charts ==
=== Weekly charts ===
Chart (2018)	Peak position
Australia (ARIA)	73
Austria (Ö3 Austria Top 40)	20
Belgium (Ultratop 50 Flanders)	42
Belgium (Ultratip Bubbling Under Wallonia)	2
Czech Republic Singles Digital (ČNS IFPI)	30
Canada Hot 100 (Billboard)	74
Denmark (Tracklisten)	35
Finland (Suomen virallinen lista)	18
France (SNEP)	31
Germany (GfK)	23
Hungary (Dance Top 40)	21
Hungary (Rádiós Top 40)	11
Hungary (Single Top 40)	38
Hungary (Stream Top 40)	15
Ireland (IRMA)	26
Italy (FIMI)	75
Netherlands (Dutch Top 40)	13
Netherlands (Single Top 100)	21
New Zealand Heatseekers (RMNZ)	10
Norway (VG-lista)	9
Poland Airplay (ZPAV)	24
Poland (Video Chart)	4
Portugal (AFP)	61
Scottish Singles Sales (Official Charts)	62
Slovakia Singles Digital (ČNS IFPI)	34
Sweden (Sverigetopplistan)	15
Switzerland (Schweizer Hitparade)	22
UK Dance (Official Charts)	3
UK Singles (Official Charts)	29
US Dance Club Songs (Billboard)	34
US Hot Dance/Electronic Songs (Billboard)	8

=== Year-end charts ===
Chart (2018)	Position
Denmark (Tracklisten)	94
France (SNEP)	134
Hungary (Dance Top 40)	61
Netherlands (Dutch Top 40)	83
Netherlands (Single Top 100)	79
Sweden (Sverigetopplistan)	55
US Hot Dance/Electronic Songs (Billboard)	33

== Certifications ==
Region	Certification	Certified units/sales
Austria (IFPI Austria)	Gold	15,000^{‡}
Canada (Music Canada)	Platinum	80,000^{‡}
Denmark (IFPI Danmark)	Platinum	90,000^{‡}
France (SNEP)	Platinum	200,000^{‡}
Germany (BVMI)	Gold	200,000^{‡}
Italy (FIMI)	Platinum	50,000^{‡}
New Zealand (RMNZ)	Platinum	30,000^{‡}
Norway (IFPI Norway)	Platinum	60,000^{‡}
Poland (ZPAV)	Platinum	20,000^{‡}
Spain (Promusicae)	Gold	30,000^{‡}
United Kingdom (BPI)	Gold	400,000^{‡}
United States (RIAA)	Gold	500,000^{‡}
^{‡} Sales+streaming figures based on certification alone.

== Release history ==
Region	Date	Format	Version	Label	Ref.
Various	22 February 2018	Digital download	Original	What a Music	
Various	8 June 2018	Digital download	Remixes	What a Music	
