= Weekend Festival =

Annual Finnish music festival

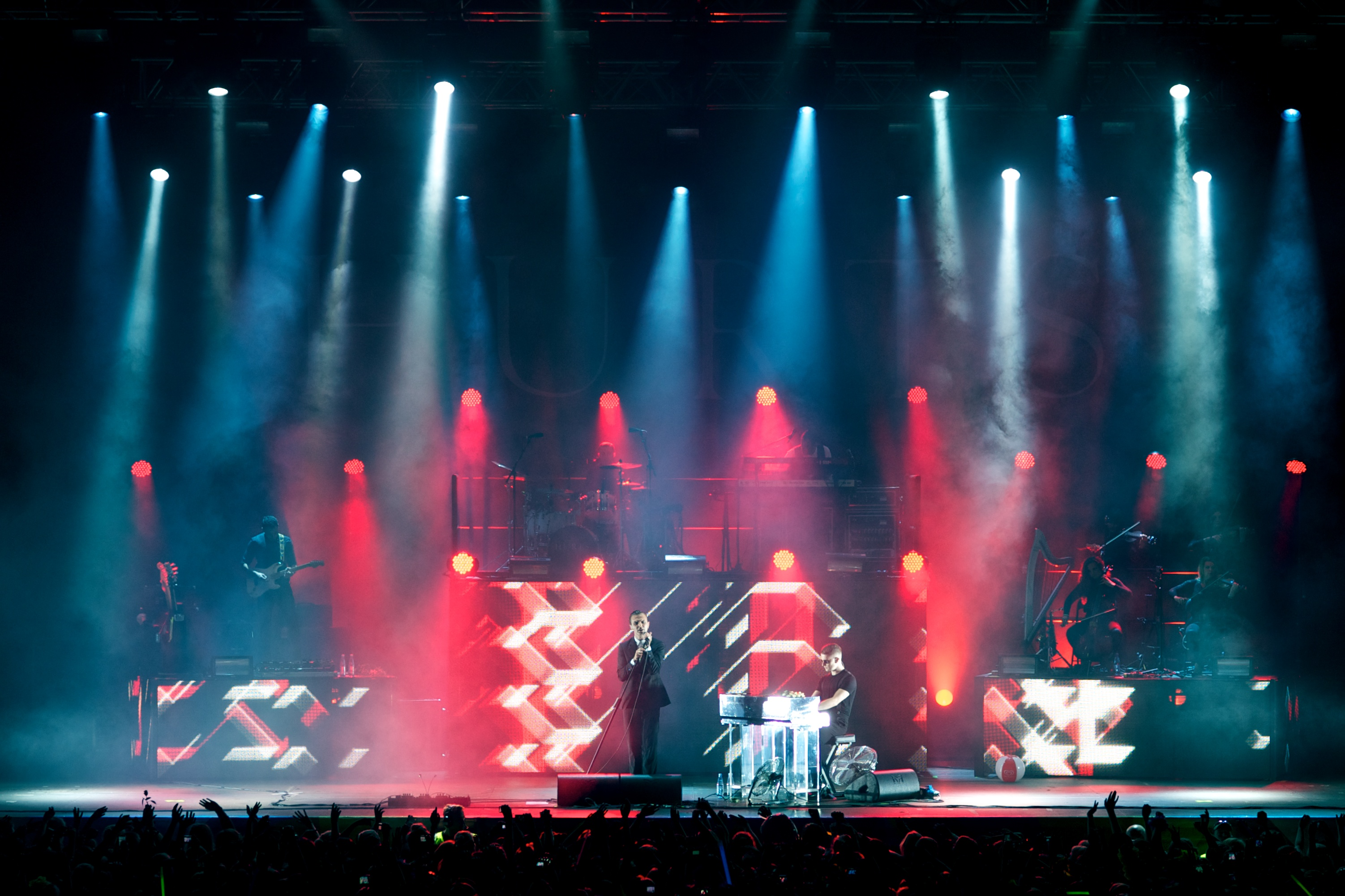
- Genre: Popular music
- Dates: Early July
- Locations: Espoo, Finland (2012); Helsinki, Finland (2013–2019); Pärnu, Estonia (2015–2018); Stockholm, Sweden (2016)
- Years active: 2012–2019, 2022–present
- Attendance: 70,000 (2016) (Finland)
- Website: Weekend Finland

Weekend Festival is a music festival taking place in Hämeenlinna, previously also in Helsinki, Stockholm and Pärnu. The festival was organised for the first time in Luukki, Espoo (about 25 km from the centre of Helsinki), Finland on the 17 and 18 of August 2012. In 2013 the festival location was changed to its old location at Kyläsaari/Kalasatama in Helsinki. In 2018 the festival moved to Hietaniemi also in Helsinki. In 2019 it moved to Suvilahti, Helsinki. Weekend Festival artist line up has mainly consisted of EDM artists but there have also been artists from other music genres present. The festival has been attended by more than 40,000 people on both years. Every year the festival has a different theme which reflects mainly in the visual side of the festival. In 2013 the festival theme was Space and Future while for 2014 the organisers decided to go with Electro Disco theme. The festival lineup has featured various internationally acclaimed artists including Skrillex, David Guetta, Calvin Harris, and Martin Garrix. and Finland's own popular artists. Weekend Festival has sold out in advance on both years. In 2013 Weekend Festival was voted as the best summer festival by the listeners of Finnish radio station YleX. In 2015, Weekend Festival expanded to Pärnu, Estonia and in 2016 to Sweden.

== Festival area ==
The first Weekend Festival took place in Luukki, Espoo in 2012. Luukki Recreational Area is located 23 km from the centre of Helsinki, Finland. The heart of Luukki, which is one of the most popular outdoor recreation areas in the Helsinki region, is an old manor. The area includes 20 hectares of forest inhabited by flying squirrels. The festival area featured three stages: NRJ Stage, Weekend Stage and Party Stage. There was also a camping area.

Following the traffic difficulties in 2012, the festival was moved from the green Luukki forests to a more urban Kyläsaari/Kalasatama Festival area in 2013. The festival area in Kyläsaari/Kalasatama is four metro stops away from the Helsinki Railway Station and also easily reachable on bus, bike or foot. Kalasatama Festival area has hosted in past various bigger concerts and festivals including Sonisphere 2011, Foo Fighters and Green Day. Weekend Festival 2013 had four stages: NRJ Stage, Weekend Stage (tent), Future Stage and Galaxy Stage. Future Stage was located at the Kyläsaari harbour. The festival area in Kyläsaari does not feature a camping ground.

In 2015, Weekend Festival Baltic also took place on Pärnu beach, Estonia, with three stages. The last festival in Estonia took place in 2018. Weekend Festival Baltic OÜ, the organizer of the Estonian festival, declared bankruptcy on 27 February 2019.

In 2018 the festival moved to Hietaniemi beach and expanded to a 3-day festival.

Due to the COVID-19 pandemic, Weekend Festival 2020, planned to take place at Käpylä Sports Park in Helsinki, was canceled.

== Weekend Festival line-ups ==
=== 2012 ===
	NRJ Stage	Weekend Stage	Party Stage
Friday, 17 August	David Guetta; Skrillex; Axl Smith; Nimetön	OFWGKTA; Cheek; Stig	Cityflash; Grind; DJ Sampl; DJ Taste; Maison & Dragen; Sergei Shkuroff; Housemotion
Saturday, 18 August	Hurts; Carpark North; Donkeyboy; Poets of the Fall; Jukka Poika	Sebastian Ingrosso; Summer Sound Special; Haloo Helsinki! Breathe Carolina; Redrama	Michael Gray; HeavyWeight DJ's; Mixxed DJ's; DJ Mio & Upi; Smith & Mellin; DJ Toinen Minä

=== 2013 (Future Space Edition) ===
	NRJ Stage	Weekend Stage	Future Stage	Galaxy Stage
Friday, 16 August	Armin van Buuren; Example; Cheek; Justimus	Calvin Harris; Sub Focus DJ set Redrama; Far East Movement	Dimitri Vegas & Like Mike; Zedd; Orkidea & friends Porter Robinson; Nause	Darude; Rony Rex; Another Me; Cityflash; Rno; Sergei Shkuroff; Optimus Krime; Dosse
Saturday, 17 August	David Guetta; Juno (rapper); Inna; Karri Koira	Sebastian Ingrosso; Heavyweight DJ's; Aste	Pendulum DJ set Feed Me; Cazzette; Gwise; K-System	Jeremy Folderol; DJ Ton-E; DJ Spinny; Mixxed DJ's; Housemotion; DJ Sampl; Rahim; Elukka

=== 2014 (Electro Disco Edition) ===
	NRJ Stage	Future Stage	WKND Stage / Orkidea & Friends Stage
Friday, 15 August	Calvin Harris; Dimitri Vegas & Like Mike; Afrojack; Martin Garrix; Showtek; Redrama	Headhunterz; R3hab; Brennan Heart; Borgore; Wolf Pack; Nöstravë	Zomboy; DJ Bl3nd; Apster; Gwise; K-System; Joonas Hahmo; The Second Level; Jeremy Folderol; Tom Dostinov; Cityflash
Saturday, 16 August	Deadmau5; Hardwell; Knife Party; Heavyweight; JVG; Nopsajalka	Borgeous; Deorro; Alex Kunnari; Dyro; Contiez; Michael Calfan	Proteus & J7; Orkidea; Super8 & Tab; Lenno; Heikki L Rico Tubbs; Orion; Rony Rex

=== 2015 (Super Digital Edition) ===
	Loop Stage	Future Stage	WKND Stage	Digital Stage
Friday, 7 August	Hardwell; David Guetta; Showtek; Chase & Status; Felix Jaehn; Robin Schulz	Rudimental; Infected Mushroom; Heavyweight; DJ Bl3nd; Milla Lehto; Ousnap; Super8 & Tab; JS16	Modestep; Sanni; Temper 2 TCT	Sasha F Ninth Floor; Wasted Penguinz; Proteus; Wildstylez; Coone; Zatox; Angerfist
Saturday, 8 August	Avicii; Armin van Buuren; Martin Garrix; W & W Tungevaag & Raaban	R3hab; Headhunterz; Brennan Heart; Atmozfears; Astrix; Darude; Orkidea; The Second Level	Example & DJ Wire; Sini Sabotage; Tippa-T; Nikke Ankara	Chris Lake; Pep & Rash; Henry Krinkle; Yas Lo; Lenno; Orion; Tom Dostinov; Laz Perkins; Alora & Senii

=== 2016 (Year of the Tiger Edition) ===
	Cell Stage	WKND Live Stage	Future Stage	Digital Stage	Rave Corner
Friday, 5 August	Axwell Λ Ingrosso; Antti Tuisku; Steve Aoki; Dimitri Vegas & Like Mike; Rebecca & Fiona; DVBBS; JVG	Infected Mushroom; Sigma; Reino Nordin; Heavyweight; Teflon Brothers	Don Diablo; ATB; TJR; Will Sparks; The Second Level; Sam Feldt; Pep & Rash; Watermät	Angerfist; Evil Activities; Radical Redemption; Frontliner; Da Tweekaz; Coone; Proteus; Djane J7	Milla Lehto; Laz Perkins & Thrill Mode; Rony Rex; Orion; Cartoon; K-System; Will Dragen; Alora & Senii; Spinny
Saturday, 6 August	Hardwell; Armin van Buuren; Knife Party; Tiësto; Martin Garrix; Tungevaag & Raaban; Samlight	Example; Darude; Redfoo; Alan Walker; Eevil Stöö	Ummet Ozcan; Lost Frequencies; Brennan Heart; DJ Bl3nd; Matisse & Sadko; Paul Morrell; Temper2; Sigala	Cedric Gervais; Justin Prime; Mr. Belt & Wezol; Jack Perry; Ilari; Lavn & Daddy Flix; Alex Nieminen	Super8 & Tab; Orkidea; Alex Mattson; Efo; Ninth Floor; Alex Kunnari; Dosse; Flowjacks; Salazar Pakjou; Cat

=== 2017 (Neon Dreams Edition) ===
	Loop Stage	WKND Stage	Future Stage	The Dome K18	Digital Stage
Friday, 4 August	The Chainsmokers; Marshmello; Armin van Buuren; Rae Sremmurd; Don Diablo; Alan Walker	SHRKTOPS; Inna; Teflon Brothers; View; Kauriinmetsästäjät	Dillon Francis; Brennan Heart; Tchami; Sub Focus; GTA; Alok; The Second Level; Laz Perkins; Pawl	Heavyweight; UMEK; Chocolate Puma; Thomas Jack; Orion; Alex Nieminen; Milla Lehto; Supermodels From Paris; Concha; Jekaterina; Marc	Wasted Penguinz; Code Black; Bass Modulators; J7; Fox Stevenson; Futuristik; Muffler
Saturday, 5 August	Deadmau5; Pendulum; Clean Bandit; Tungevaag & Raaban; Reino Nordin	Icona Pop; Mikael Gabriel; Cheat Codes; Sonny; Pike; Kingfish; Diison	Jauz; Valentino Khan; Kungs; Mike Perry; Pegboard Nerds; Yellow Claw; Alex Mattson; Milwin	DJ Thastor; Felix Da Housecat; Tensnake; Zombie Nation; Kiasmos DJ; Orkidea; Rony Rex; Bombossa Brothers; Efo; Temper2; Oded Peled	AniMe; Sound Rush; Proteus; Sasha F Infekto; Physics

=== 2018 ===
Friday, 17 August	$uicideboy$ Axwell Λ Ingrosso; The Prodigy; A Boogie with Da Hoodie; Desiigner; Oliver Heldens; Showtek	Zhu; Breathe Carolina; Moksi; Gettomasa	The Second Level; Evil Sköö & Koksu Koo; Mikael Gabriel; Nelli Matula; Asa x DJ Polarsoul; Brennan Heart; Marcel Woods; Psyko Punkz; Rony Rex	Swanky Tunes; Tippa&Bizi
Saturday, 18 August	Post Malone; David Guetta; Macklemore; Hardwell; Big Shaq; JVG	Slushii; Galantis; R3HAB; Vesta; Alex Mattso	Bess; Brooks; Onni Boi; Versace Hendrix X Musta Hanhi X NCOVersace; Elastinen; Heavyweight; Kevin Tandu; Lemaitre	Lumïsade; Malaa; Martin Jensen; OG Ulla-Maija; Otto Know; Salvatore Ganacci; Temper2; Bombossa Brothers
Sunday, 19 August	Martin Garrix; Stefflon Don; Cledos; Headhunterz; TUJAMO	Tungevaag & Raaban; AC Slater; Martin Solveig; Netsky; Don Diablo	Gasellit; YBN Nahmir; Lil Yachty; Pastori Pike & Aito G's; KSHMR; Lil Xan; Evarist X MK8; IBE	JS 16; Orkidea; Ruudolf & Karri Koira; Vicetone; View

== Weekend Festival Baltic line-ups ==
=== 2015 (Super Digital Edition) ===
	Weekend Stage	Future Stage	WKND Stage
Thursday, 6 August	Tiësto; MOTi; Super8 & Tab; Chris Lake	Brennan Heart; Headhunterz; Pep & Rash; Henry Krinkle; Astrix	-
Friday, 7 August	Armin van Buuren; Example & DJ Wire; Tungevaag & Raaban; NERO; Hardwell; Darude	Sub Focus; Robin Schulz; AronChupa; Atmozfears; Rudimental; Cartoon	Orkidea; The Second Level; Anton & Heikki L [Ex] da Bass; Centron; Bombossa Brothers; Diana D DJ Gustavito; Josh Jay & Ivar Mind
Saturday, 8 August	Martin Garrix; David Guetta; Felix Jaehn; Showtek; Chase & Status; Grind Live	Syn Cole; Netsky; Wildstylez; Noisecontrollers; DJ Bl3nd	Beat Service; Bad J Kristjan Hirmo; Kert Klaus; Proteus; Planeet; Kolzar; Sven Arusoo; Tarmo Tammel

=== 2016 (Year of the Tiger Edition) ===
	Weekend Stage	WKND Live Stage	Future Stage	Digital Stage
Thursday, August 4	Avicii; Steve Aoki; DVBBS; Knife Party; Lost Frequencies; Darude	Example; Infected Mushroom; Redfoo; Angerfist; Sigma	Ummet Ozcan; TJR; DJ Bl3nd; Will Sparks; Sam Feldt; Matisse & Sadko; Watermät; Mr. Belt & Wezol; Jack Perry	Kristjan Hirmo; Kert Klaus; Heavyweight; Bad J Paul Oja; Clubmusic Takeover; Latvian DJ competition winner
Friday, August 5	Tiësto; Martin Garrix; Robin Schulz; Showtek; Otto Knows; Axwell Λ Ingrosso; Syn Cole; Temper2	Brainstorm; Alan Walker; PeR; I Wear* Experiment; Elina Born	Headhunterz; Michael Calfan; Brennan Heart; Alex Mattson; AronChupa; Chicane; Tigerlily; Justin Prime	Orkidea [Ex] da Bass; Dr. Philgood; Bombossa Brothers; Planeet; Sven Arusoo; Kermo Hert; Andres Puusepp; Erkki Sarapuu
Saturday, August 6	Dimitri Vegas & Like Mike; Afrojack; Rudimental; Tungevaag & Raaban; ATB; Netsky	Cartoon; Isac Elliot; NOËP; Würffel; Epordwerk	Don Diablo; Sigala; Bassjackers; Da Tweekaz; Coone; Wildstylez; Pep & Rash; Radistai	The Second Level; Proteus; MHKL; Alex Wave; Niskerone; Coverk x Byte; Futuristik; Lia Lisse; Diana D Hot n' Handsome

=== 2017 (Neon Beach Edition) ===
	Main Stage	WKND Stage	Future Stage
Thursday, August 3	Armin van Buuren; Alesso; Don Diablo; Madison Mars; Alan Walker	Tchami; Rae Sremmurd; Alok; Flux Pavilion; Filatov & Karas	Wild Motherfuckers; Brennan Heart; Camo & Krooked; Sub Focus; Matrix & Futurebound; The Second Level; Ally & Siger; Pawl; Marc
Friday, August 4	Deadmau5; Knife Party; Tungevaag & Raaban; The Chainsmokers; NOËP	Clean Bandit; Jauz; Valentino Khan; R3hab; Kisma; Pegboard Nerds; Milwin	Angerfist; Radical Redemption; Proteus; Alex Mattson; Bombossa Brothers; Kert Klaus; Kristjan Hirmo; Andres Puusepp; Hot n' Handsome; Christian Saburo
Saturday, August 5	Martin Garrix; Chase & Status; CARTOON; Syn Cole; Kungs	Cheat Codes; SHRKTOPS; Alma; Púr Múdd; Epordwerk; Fox Stevenson	Bass Modulators; Macky Gee; GTA; MHKL; Futuristik; Sven Arusoo [Ex] da Bass; Coverk x Byte; Erkki Sarapuu; Marek Talivere

== Weekend Festival Sweden line-ups ==
=== 2016 (Year of the Tiger Edition) ===
	Mega Cell	WKND Live Stage	Future Stage
Friday, 5 August	Dimitri Vegas & Like Mike; Fatboy Slim; DVBBS; Tungevaag & Raaban; Lost Frequencies; Sigala	Redfoo; Example; NCBM (Noisecontrollers & Bass Modulators); Grabb	Ummet Ozcan; Bassjackers; Wildstylez; DJ Bl3nd; Matisse & Sadko; Darude; Mr. Belt & Wezol; Jack Perry; Pendla
Saturday, 6 August	Tiësto; Martin Garrix; Showtek; Steve Aoki; Rebecca & Fiona; Michael Calfan	Alan Walker; Sigma; Infected Mushroom; Madcon	TJR; Will Sparks; Vigiland; AronChupa; Tigerlily; Felix Andersson; Watermät; Pawl; Sam Feldt

== Awards ==
Weekend Festival was nominated for Best Festival award in Music & Media Industry Awards in 2013.

Finnish radio station YleX listeners voted Weekend Festival as the best festival of the summer in Finland in 2013. Weekend Festival gathered 25% of the total votes.

Weekend Festival was also nominated as the Best Medium-sized Festival in 2013 at European Festival Awards.

== See also ==
- List of electronic music festivals
