= Nothing Inside =

Nothing Inside may refer to:

- "Nothing Inside", song by Sander van Doorn featuring Mayaeni 2012
- "Nothing Inside", song by Singapore Sling (band) 2012
- "Nothing Inside", song by Machine Gun Kelly from Tickets to My Downfall 2020
