= Weekend Festival Baltic =

Dance music festival in Baltic states

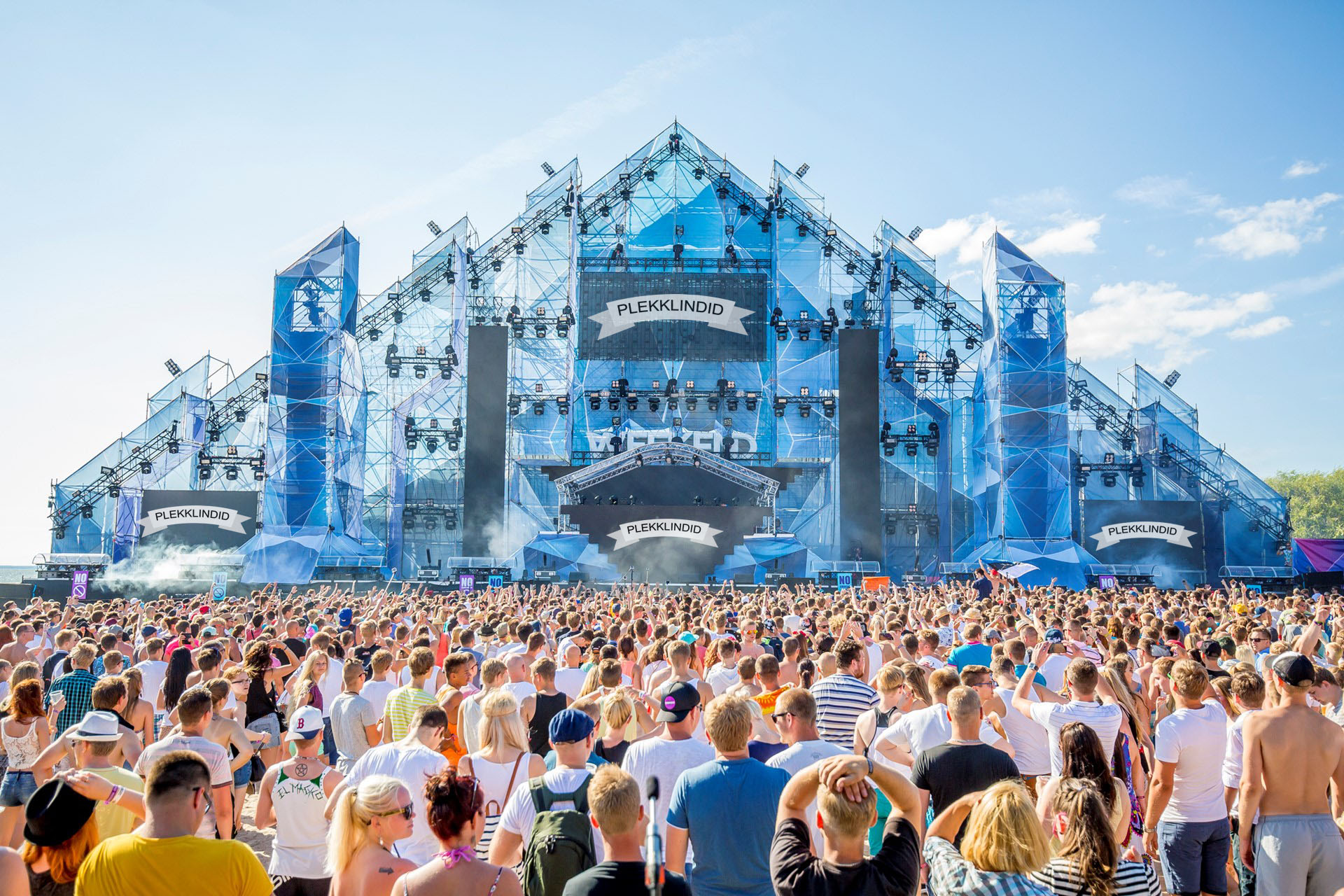
- Weekend Festival Baltic 2015
- Status: Inactive
- Genre: Electronic music festival
- Frequency: Annually
- Venue: Pärnu Beach
- Locations: Pärnu, Estonia
- Country: Estonia
- Years active: 2015-2018
- Attendance: 75,000+
- Organizer: Weekend Festival Baltic OÜ
- Website: https://weekendbaltic.com/

Weekend Festival Baltic was the Estonian edition of the Weekend Festival, the largest dance music festival in Scandinavia. Stages are headlined by DJs from across the electronic dance music (EDM) spectrum, with audiovisual support. The Estonian version of the event first took place in 2015.

== History ==
Weekend Festival started in Finland in 2012 and quickly became one of Europe's largest EDM festivals. In 2015, Weekend Festival expanded to the Baltic region, taking place at Pärnu Beach in Estonia. Weekend Festival Baltic was held annually from 2015 until 2018. The organizer, Weekend Festival Baltic OÜ, declared bankruptcy in 2019, and a planned concert in 2020 was cancelled due to the COVID-19 pandemic.

== Artist line-ups ==
=== 2015 ===
	Weekend Stage	Future Stage	WKND Stage
Thursday, August 6	Tiësto; MOTi; Super8 & Tab; Chris Lake	Brennan Heart; Headhunterz; Pep & Rash; Henry Krinkle; Astrix	-
Friday, August 7	Armin van Buuren; Example & DJ Wire; Tungevaag & Raaban; NERO; Hardwell; Darude	Sub Focus; Robin Schulz; AronChupa; Atmozfears; Rudimental; Cartoon	Orkidea; The Second Level; Anton & Heikki L [Ex] da Bass; Centron; Bombossa Brothers; Diana D DJ Gustavito; Josh Jay & Ivar Mind
Saturday, August 8	Martin Garrix; David Guetta; Felix Jaehn; Showtek; Chase & Status; Grind Live	Syn Cole; Netsky; Wildstylez; Noisecontrollers; DJ Bl3nd	Beat Service; Bad J Kristjan Hirmo; Kert Klaus; Proteus; Planeet; Kolzar; Sven Arusoo; Tarmo Tammel

=== 2016 ===
	Weekend Stage	WKND Live Stage	Future Stage	Digital Stage
Thursday, August 4	Avicii; Steve Aoki; DVBBS; Knife Party; Lost Frequencies; Darude	Example; Infected Mushroom; Redfoo; Angerfist; Sigma	Ummet Ozcan; TJR; DJ Bl3nd; Will Sparks; Sam Feldt; Matisse & Sadko; Watermät; Mr. Belt & Wezol; Jack Perry	Kristjan Hirmo; Kert Klaus; Heavyweight; Bad J Paul Oja; Clubmusic Takeover; Latvian DJ competition winner
Friday, August 5	Tiësto; Martin Garrix; Robin Schulz; Showtek; Otto Knows; Axwell Λ Ingrosso; Syn Cole; Temper 2	Brainstorm; Alan Walker; PeR; I Wear* Experiment; Elina Born	Headhunterz; Michael Calfan; Brennan Heart; Alex Mattson; AronChupa; Chicane; Tigerlily; Justin Prime	Orkidea [Ex] da Bass; Dr. Philgood; Bombossa Brothers; Planeet; Sven Arusoo; Kermo Hert; Andres Puusepp; Erkki Sarapuu
Saturday, August 6	Dimitri Vegas & Like Mike; Afrojack; Rudimental; Tungevaag & Raaban; ATB; Netsky	CARTOON; Isac Elliot; NOËP; Würffel; Epordwerk	Don Diablo; Sigala; Bassjackers; Da Tweekaz; Coone; Wildstylez; Pep & Rash; Radistai	The Second Level; Proteus; MHKL; Alex Wave; Niskerone; Coverk x Byte; Futuristik; Lia Lisse; Diana D Hot n' Handsome

=== 2017 ===
	Main Stage	WKND Stage	Future Stage
Thursday, August 3	Armin van Buuren; Alesso; Don Diablo; Madison Mars; Alan Walker	Tchami; Rae Sremmurd; Alok; Flux Pavilion; Filatov & Karas	Wild Motherfuckers; Brennan Heart; Camo & Krooked; Sub Focus; Matrix & Futurebound; The Second Level; Ally & Siger; Pawl; Marc
Friday, August 4	Deadmau5; Knife Party; Tungevaag & Raaban; The Chainsmokers; NOËP	Clean Bandit; Jauz; Valentino Khan; R3hab; Kisma; Pegboard Nerds; Milwin	Angerfist; Radical Redemption; Proteus; Alex Mattson; Bombossa Brothers; Kert Klaus; Kristjan Hirmo; Andres Puusepp; Hot n' Handsome; Christian Saburo
Saturday, August 5	Martin Garrix; Chase & Status; CARTOON; Syn Cole; Kungs	Cheat Codes; ItaloBrothers; Alma; Púr Múdd; Epordwerk; Fox Stevenson	Bass Modulators; Macky Gee; GTA; MHKL; Futuristik; Sven Arusoo [Ex] da Bass; Coverk x Byte; Erkki Sarapuu; Marek Talivere

=== 2018 ===
	Main Stage	WKND Tent	Future Stage	Katel (August 16) /Hard Nation (August 17) /Machine Nation (August 18)
Thursday, August 16	Arop Desiigner Oliver Heldens Afrojack Post Malone Axwell & Ingrosso	Lemaitre Zhu A Boogie Wit Da Hoodie Suicideboys Brennan Heart	Cityflash & Laura-Ly The Second Level Frank Walker Moksi Swanky Tunes Alan Walker Slushii	Kaarel Sein Eisi Rulers of The Deep Majamasin Bombossa Brothers
Friday, August 17	Pur Mudd Headhunterz R3hab Galantis Kygo David Guetta	Andres Puusepp B2B Andres Paljaste Rämmar DJ's 5 Miinust Relanex Big Shaq Lemon Fight Don Diablo	Sander Valge & Siim Taba Kert Klaus Brooks Syn Cole Madison Mars Martin Jensen Malaa	Reducerboy The Renegade B2B P-Project Proteus Hardstyle Toys Zero Opacity Critical Enemiez B2B Paralyze Sunny Dee B2B Cityflash Korsakoff
Saturday, August 18	Tungevaag & Raaban Sigma Martin Solveig Kshmr The Prodigy Hardwell	Getter Jaani Kermo Hert Gorgon City Inna Tujamo Netsky	Marek Talivere Erkki Sarapuu Stacey James & Kevin Kmk Coverxbyte Wateva Ac Slater Andy C	Tarmo Paluoja Kekkonen & Õis Fok Yee Merimell Bas Mooy Pfriter

== See also ==
- List of electronic music festivals
