= Mr. Belt & Wezol =

Dutch electronic music duo

- Origin: Delft, Netherlands
- Genres: Tech house; deep house; future house
- Occupation: DJs
- Years active: 2013–present
- Labels: Spinnin'; Musical Freedom; Spinnin' Deep; Potion, Heldeep Records; Future House Music; SPRS; FFRR; Ego; Ultra Music; Digital Teddy Ltd; Spinnin' Remixes; Armada Music; WEA France; Found Frequencies
- Members: Bart Riem; Sam van Wees
- Website: mrbeltandwezol.nl

Mr. Belt & Wezol are a Dutch electronic music duo consisting of DJ Bart Riem (pronounced [bɑrt ˈrim]) and DJ and music producer Sam van Wees (pronounced [ˈsɑɱ vɑɱ ˈʋeːs]). The duo's tracks "Finally" and "Somebody to Love" (2015) reached the top 10 of Beatport for several weeks. In 2016 the duo won the "Breakthrough Artist of the Year" award at the 31st Annual International Dance Music Awards.

== History ==
Since 2014, Mr. Belt & Wezol run a monthly podcast. It started under the name "Mr. Belt & Wezol Music Club" and continues as "The Cuckoo's Nest". In 2014, the duo permed in Club Unit in Herentals, Belgium.

In 2016, Mr. Belt & Wezol performed at Wish Outdoor in Beek en Donk, the Dance Nature Festival in Eindhoven, the Weekend Festival in Stockholm and at the Weekend Festival Baltic in Pärnu, Estonia. In 2017, they performed in the Indian Summer Festival of Langedijk, in Wish Outdoor, the Lakedance Festival in Best, and the Summer Festival of Antwerp. In 2018 they could be seen and heard at deep house stages in Amsterdam, Groningen, and Oldenzaal. In 2019, Mr Belt & Wezol performed at the festivals Sneeuwbal in Utrecht, Paaspop in Schijndel, We Are Electric in Eersel and again at Wish Outdoor.

== Awards ==
- 2016: 31st Annual International Dance Music Award in the category best breakthrough artist (group)

== Discography ==
=== Extended plays ===
- 2014: Slow Me Down
- 2014: Atlas / Miracle [Love Not Money Records]

=== Singles ===
- 2013: "Homeless (Original Mix)"
- 2014: "The One"
- 2014: "Lone"
- 2014: "Toys"
- 2014: "Sneak"
- 2014: "Luv Thang"
- 2014: "Cheater"
- 2014: "Small Rooms" (with De Hofnar)
- 2014: "Shiver" [Spinnin' Records]
- 2014: "Feel So Good" [Musical Freedom]
- 2014: "Pikachu" (with Oliver Heldens) [Spinnin' Records]
- 2014: "Time" [Spinnin' Deep]
- 2015: "Finally" [Spinnin' Deep]
- 2015: "Somebody to Love" (with Freejak) [Spinnin' Deep]
- 2015: "RDY2FLY" [Spinnin' Deep]
- 2016: "Faith" (with Daser) [Potion]
- 2016: "Hide & Seek" (with Shermanology) [Heldeep Records]
- 2016: "Stand Up"
- 2017: "Boogie Wonderland" [Spinnin' Records]
- 2017: "Take Me Higher" [Future House Music]
- 2017: "Good Times" [Spinnin' Deep]
- 2017: "One More Day" (with Aevion) [SPRS]
- 2018: "Let's All Chant" [Spinnin']
- 2018: "Stupid" (with LucyXX) [Spinnin']
- 2018: "Harmony" [Heldeep Records]
- 2019: "The Rhythm" [Spinnin' Records]
- 2019: "One Thing" (with Jack Wins) [Spinnin' Records]
- 2019: "Mind Control" [Armada Music]
- 2019: "Do It for Love" (featuring Sander Nijbroek) [Spinnin' Records]
- 2019: "Not Dancing" [Spinnin' Records]
- 2020: "The Jabberwock" [Heldeep Records]
- 2020: "Homeless" [Spinnin' Records]
- 2021: "Way It Is" [Spinnin' Records]
- 2022: "Genesis" [Spinnin' Records]
- 2022: "Work That" [Spinnin' Records]
- 2022: "I Feel Love" [Spinnin' Records]
- 2022: "Body Rock" [Spinnin' Records]
- 2022: "Mistakes" [Spinnin' Records]
- 2023: "Fool" [Spinnin' Records]
- 2023: "Groove Tonight" [Spinnin' Records]
- 2023: "Waiting for You" [Spinnin' Records]
- 2024: "It’s Not Right (But It’s OK)" [Sony Music Entertainment]
- 2025: “Don’t Stop Lovin’” [Sony Music Entertainment]
- 2026: "Accelrate" (with HARLEE) The Cuckoos Nest

=== Remixes ===
- 2014: "Too Much" (Drake, Sampha)
- 2014: "Renegade Master" (Wildchild)
- 2014: "New Orleans" (Naxxos) [Spinnin' Deep]
- 2014: "Guitar Track" (Sander van Doorn & Firebeatz)
- 2014: "Gecko (Overdrive)" (Oliver Heldens & Becky Hill) [FFRR]
- 2014: "Cool Enough" (Spada & Elen Levon) [Ego]
- 2015: "Sometimes" (Alle Farben & Graham Candy)
- 2015: "Till It Hurts" (Yellow Claw ft. Ayden) [Spinnin' Records]
- 2015: "Raindrops" (SNBRN ft. Kerli) [Ultra Music]
- 2015: "We Like to Party" (Showtek)
- 2015: "The Party (This Is How We Do It)" (Joe Stone ft. Montell Jordan) [Spinnin' Records]
- 2015: "New Love" (The Arches) [Potion]
- 2015: "Never Forget You" (Zara Larsson & MNEK) [Digital Teddy Ltd]
- 2016: "Hold On" (MOGUAI ft. Cheat Codes) [Spinnin' Remixes]
- 2016: "Sparks" (Gramercy ft. Sharna Bass) [Armada Music]
- 2017: "Katchi" (Ofenbach vs. Nick Waterhouse) [WEA France]
- 2017: "Back for More" (Feder ft. Daecolm)
- 2018: "Crazy" (Lost Frequencies & Zonderling) [Found Frequencies]
- 2018: "Talk to Me" (GoldFish) [Armada]
