= Pawl (disambiguation) =

A pawl is a mechanical component that restricts movement

Pawl may also refer to:

- Pawl (constructor), a former racing car constructor
- Pawl (musician), a Swedish artist, producer and DJ

== See also ==
- Paul (disambiguation)
