= Supernatural (disambiguation) =

Supernatural most commonly refers to unexplained or non-natural forces and phenomena.

Supernatural may also refer to:

== Film and television ==
=== Film ===
- Supernatural film, a film genre
- Supernatural (film), a 1933 film by Victor Halperin starring Carole Lombard
- The Supernaturals (film), a 1986 horror film

=== Television ===
- Supernatural (British TV series), a 1977 BBC anthology drama
- Supernatural (American TV series), a 2005–2020 television series
- Supernatural: The Unseen Powers of Animals, a BBC natural history documentary series

== Music ==
=== Performers ===
- Supernatural (group), a Swedish pop group consisting of winners from Popstars
- Supernatural (rapper) (born 1970), American rapper
- The Supernaturals, a pop-rock quintet from Glasgow, Scotland, United Kingdom

=== Albums ===
- Supernatural (EP), by Alien Crime Syndicate, 1999
- Supernatural (Ben E. King album), 1975
- Supernatural (DC Talk album), and its title track, 1998
- Supernatural (Des'ree album), 1998
- Supernatural (Santana album), 1999
- Supernatural (Stereo MCs album), 1990
- Supernaturalistic (album), by Sander van Doorn, 2008
- Supernatural, by Criss Angel, 2003
- Supernatural, by Robben Ford, 1999

=== Songs ===
- "Supernatural" (Kesha song), 2012
- "Supernatural" (NewJeans song), 2024
- "Supernatural" (Wild Orchid song), 1997
- "Supernatural" (Ariana Grande song), from Eternal Sunshine, 2024
- "Supernatural", by Ben Rector from The Joy of Music, 2022
- "Supernatural", by Daughtry from Leave This Town, 2009
- "Supernatural", by Flyleaf from Much Like Falling, 2007
- "Supernatural", by Itzy from Gold, 2024
- "Supernatural", by Manafest from The Chase, 2010
- "Supernatural", by Midnight Youth, 2006, re-released 2008
- "Supernatural", by New Edition, for Ghostbusters II, 1989
- "Supernatural", by Raven-Symoné from the soundtrack of That's So Raven, 2004
- "Supernatural", by Sara Evans from Real Fine Place, 2005
- "Supernatural", by Sugababes from Angels With Dirty Faces, 2002
- "Super Natural", by Turnover from Good Nature, 2017
- "The Supernatural", by John Mayall & the Bluesbreakers from A Hard Road, 1967
- "Supernaturally", by Nick Cave and the Bad Seeds from Abattoir Blues / The Lyre of Orpheus, 2004

== Other uses ==
- Supernatural fiction, a literary genre
- The Supernatural, a book by Erwin Neutzsky-Wulff on supernatural phenomena
- Supernatural: Meetings with the Ancient Teachers of Mankind, a book by Graham Hancock
- Supernaturals (toy line)
- The Sims 3: Supernatural, a 2012 expansion pack for the video game The Sims 3

== See also ==
- The Supernatural (disambiguation)
- Supernature (disambiguation)
- Supernormal, a British animated television series
