= Spinnin' Deep =

Dutch record label

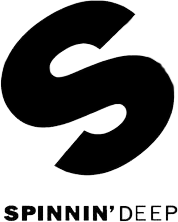
- Parent company: Spinnin' Records
- Founded: 2009
- Genre: EDM; house; deep house; downtempo; tech house; progressive house; indie dance; nu-disco; ambient; dance; future house; minimal; trap; future bass
- Country of origin: Netherlands
- Location: Amsterdam, Netherlands
- Official website: spinninrecords.nl

Spinnin' Deep is a Dutch record label founded in 2009 and specializing in house, deep house, tech house, future house and other EDM genres. It is one of the 40 sub-labels of Spinnin' Records. The label gained success rapidly in 2014, catching up with the parent label Spinnin' Records. The label includes the artists Bolier, Vector, CamelPhat, Chocolate Puma, EDX, Ferreck Dawn, Gregor Salto, Lucas & Steve, Martin Solveig, Mike Mago, Oliver Heldens, Pep & Rash, Sam Feldt, Sander Kleinenberg and Watermät. The label's first release was a compilation called Spinnin' Deep Presents: Tech-House Essentials.

The most successful international single from the label was "Intoxicated" by Martin Solveig and GTA, which reached 11th place in Germany, 81 in Australia, 26 in Ireland, 9 on the Top 40 chart in the Netherlands and 11 in the Single Top 100, and No. 5 in the United Kingdom.

== Artists ==
=== Current ===
- Audio Bullys
- Bob Sinclar
- Bolier
- CamelPhat
- Cheat Codes
- Chocolate Puma
- Danny Howard
- Dante Klein
- Deepend
- Don Diablo
- EDX
- Eelke Kleijn
- Fatboy Slim
- Ferreck Dawn
- Firebeatz
- Gregor Salto
- Kris Menace
- Lucas & Steve
- Martin Solveig
- Matisse & Sadko
- Mike Mago
- Michael Calfan
- Moguai
- Mr. Belt & Wezol
- Nora En Pure
- Oliver Heldens
- Pep & Rash
- Sam Feldt
- Sander Kleinenberg
- Sander van Doorn
- Sharam
- Shermanology
- Sleepy Tom
- Tommy Trash
- Yolanda Be Cool
- Watermät
- Zonderling

=== Past ===
- DCUP
- Dr. Kucho!
- Felix Jaehn
- GTA
- Jeremy Olander
- Jewelz
- Kayper
- Kraak & Smaak
- Lost Frequencies
- Marc Benjamin
- Mitchell Niemeyer
- NERVO
- Nicky Romero
- Parra for Cuva
- Peter Gelderblom
- Stefano Noferini
- UMEK
- Yolanda Be Cool
