= Up Till Dawn (On the Move) =

2017 song by Lucas & Steve

Single by Lucas & Steve
- Released: 28 April 2017
- Genre: Future house
- Length: 3:08
- Label: Spinnin'
- Songwriters: Bart Claessen; L. de Wert; Marcus Aleksi Tikkanen; Radboud Miedema; S. Jansen
- Producers: Lucas & Steve

Lucas & Steve singles chronology
"Enigma" (2016)	"Up Till Dawn (On the Move)" (2017)	"You Don't Have to Like It" (2018)

Music video
- "Up Till Dawn (On the Move)" music video on YouTube

"Up Till Dawn (On the Move)" is a song by Dutch DJ duo Lucas & Steve. It was released on 28 April 2017 by Spinnin' Records.

== Background ==
Lucas & Steve remixed Barthezz's dance classic ‘On The Move’ to 'Up Till Dawn (On the Move)'.

== Composition ==
We Rave You said: "the track is the perfect feel-good soundtrack, with smooth guitar licks, infectiously catchy vocals and uplifting chords."

== Charts ==
=== Weekly charts ===
Chart (2017)	Peak position
Belgium (Ultratop 50 Flanders)	32
Netherlands (Dutch Top 40)	2
Netherlands (Single Top 100)	19

=== Year-end charts ===
Chart (2017)	Position
Netherlands (Dutch Top 40)	5
Netherlands (Single Top 100)	55
