= Lucas & Steve =

Dutch DJ duo

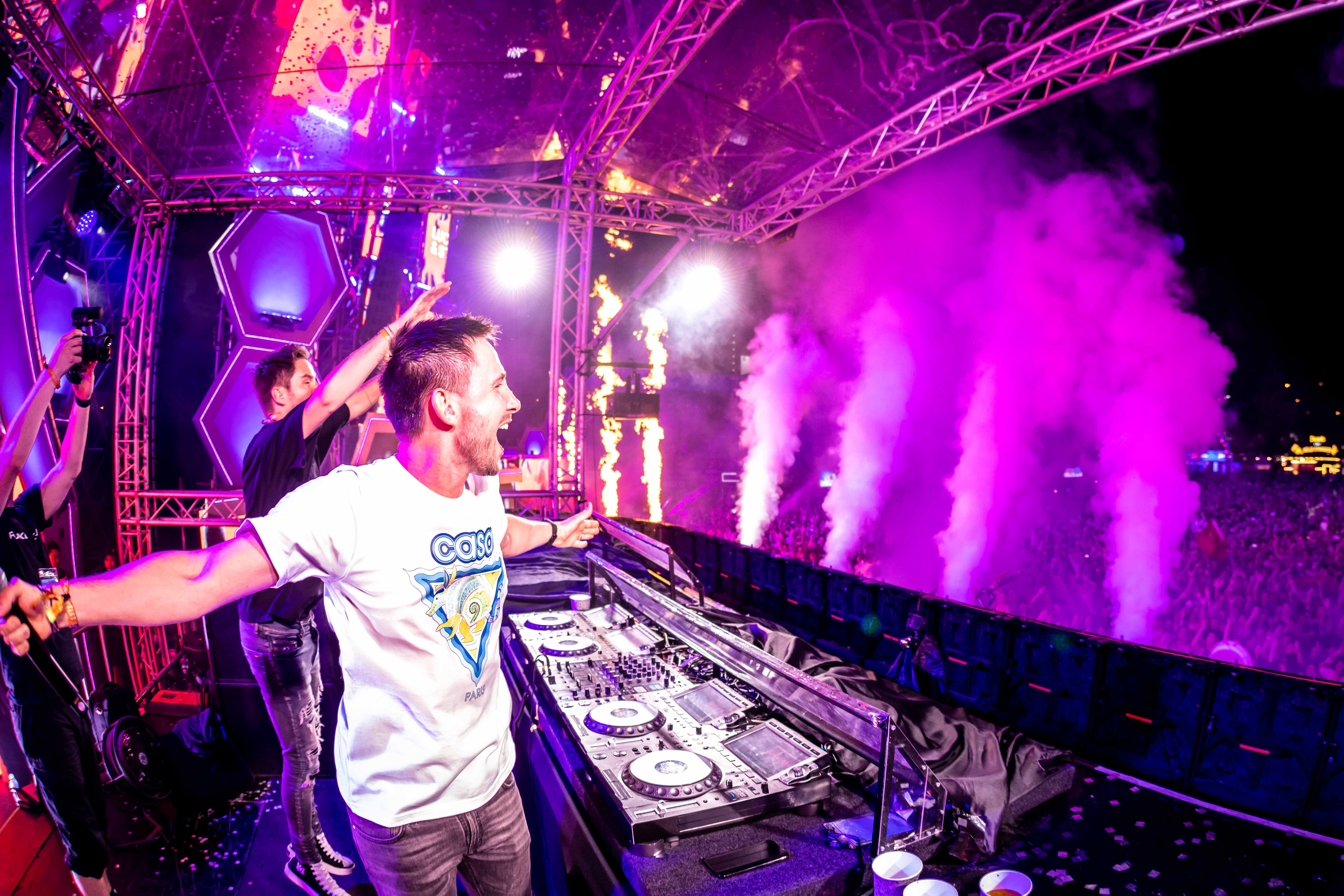
- Lucas & Steve during S2O Thailand 2023

Background information
- Origin: Maastricht, Limburg, Netherlands
- Genres: House; future house; progressive house
- Instruments: Programming, keyboards, synthesizer, piano
- Years active: 2010–present
- Labels: Spinnin' Records, Spinnin' Deep
- Members: Lucas de Wert; Steven Jansen
- Website: lucasandsteve.com/

Lucas & Steve are a Dutch house music duo formed by DJs and record producers Lucas de Wert and Steven Jansen from Maastricht.

== History ==
The duo was formed in 2010 and joined Spinnin' Records in December 2014. They released many singles on the sub-label Spinnin' Deep.

In 2014, they remixed the song "Alright" by Red Carpet.

They released "Summer on You" with Sam Feldt featuring Wulf and "Feel Alive" with Pep & Rash. Their song "Calling On You" featuring Jake Reese, debuted on a Billboard chart, at 40th on Dance/Mix Show Airplay. In 2018, they released their collaboration with Janieck called "You Don't Have to Like It".

In 2020, they released a track called "Do It for You" in collaboration with W&W. Throughout their career, they have also remixed songs by artists including Robin Schulz, Hardwell, Felix Jaehn with Lost Frequencies, Showtek and Laurent Wolf.

In October 2024, they were awarded the Future of Dance Award from Nexus Radio during their interview at the Nexus Lounge in Amsterdam.

== Discography ==
=== Albums ===
List of studio albums
Title	Details
Letters to Remember	Released: 16 October 2020; Label: Spinnin'; Formats: Digital download

=== EPs ===
Title	Details
Flyn EP	Released: 3 May 2011; Label: Housepital Records; Formats: Digital download
Mind Control EP	Released: 17 June 2011; Label: Housepital Records; Formats: Digital download
Remote EP	Released: 30 August 2011; Label: GF Recordings; Formats: Digital download
Our House EP	Released: 19 March 2012; Label: Housepital Records; Formats: Digital download
The Revolution EP	Released: 7 October 2013; Label: WTF! Music; Formats: Digital download
Rock It Now EP	Released: 25 October 2013; Label: Hotfingers; Formats: Digital download

=== Singles ===
==== Charting singles ====
Year	Title	Peak chart positions					Album
Year	Title	NLD	BEL (Fl)	BEL (Wa)	CZE Air.	SWE	Album
2015	"Calinda 2K15" (with Laurent Wolf)	—	—^{[A]}	—	—	—	Non-album singles
2016	"Make It Right"	—^{[b]}	—	—^{[C]}	—	—	Non-album singles
2016	"Summer on You" (with Sam Feldt featuring Wulf)	12	—^{[D]}	—^{[E]}	—	93	Non-album singles
2016	"Enigma" (with Pep & Rash)	—	—	—	—	—	Non-album singles
2017	"Up Till Dawn (On the Move)"	19	32	—	—	—	Non-album singles
2018	"You Don't Have to Like It" (with Janieck)	—	—^{[F]}	—	—	—	Non-album singles
2018	"Source"	—	—	—	—	—^{[G]}	Non-album singles
2018	"I Could Be Wrong" (with Brandy)	55	—	—	—	—	Non-album singles
2018	"Where Have You Gone (Anywhere)"	—	—^{[H]}	—	—	—	Letters to Remember
2019	"Perfect" (featuring Haris)	28	—^{[I]}	—^{[J]}	—	—	Letters to Remember
2020	"Letters"	51	—	—	—	—	Letters to Remember
2020	"Another Life" (featuring Alida)	70	45	—	—	—	Letters to Remember
2021	"No Diggity" (with Blackstreet)	29	—^{[K]}	—	—	—	Non-album singles
2021	"Anywhere with You" (with Afrojack and DubVision)	71	—	—	—	—	Non-album singles
2024	"Heart First" (featuring Jordan Shaw)	—	32	—	—	—	Non-album singles
2025	"Oh My Lord" (with Lawrent and Izzy Bizu)	—	—	—	5	—	Non-album singles
2025	"Love on Hold" (with Oaks and Jaimes)	—	26	—	—	—	Non-album singles
2026	"All I Know"	—	32	—	—	—	Non-album singles
"—" denotes a recording that did not chart or was not released in that territory.

==== Non-charting singles ====
Title	Year	Label	Additional information
"Above"	2011	Housepital Records	
"Mantis"	2011	WL77	
"Clueless"	2012	Dirty Soul	with Nothing But Funk
"Resistor"	2012	Spinnin Star Deep	
"The Situation"	2012	GF Recordings	
"Craving"	2014	Zulu Records	
"Without You"	2014	Hotfingers	
"Blinded"	2014	Spinnin' Deep	featuring Bethany
"Fearless"	2015	Spinnin' Deep	
"You and I Know"	2015	Spinnin' Deep	with Matt & Kendo
"Calinda 2K15"	2015	Spinnin' Deep	with Laurent Wolf
"Love Is My Game"	2015	Spinnin' Deep	with Dr. Kucho! and Gregor Salto
"Make It Right"	2016	Spinnin' Deep	
"Can't Get Enough"	2016	Spinnin' Deep	
"Enigma"	2016	Spinnin' Records	with Pep & Rash
"Summer on You"	2016	Spinnin' Deep	with Sam Feldt featuring Wulf
"Summer on You (Club Edit)"	2016	Spinnin' Records	with Sam Feldt featuring Wulf
"Love on My Mind"	2016	Spinnin' Records	
"Calling on You"	2017	Spinnin' Records	featuring Jake Reese
"Feel Alive"	2017	Spinnin' Records	with Pep & Rash
"Up Till Dawn (On the Move)"	2017	Spinnin' Records	
"These Heights"	2017	Spinnin' Records	with Bassjackers featuring Caroline Pennell
"Let's Go"	2017	Spinnin' Records	with Mike Williams and Curbi
"Show Me Your Love"	2017	Spinnin' Premium	with Firebeatz
"Stardust"	2017	Spinnin' Records	with Madison Mars
"Keep Your Head Up"	2017	Spinnin' Records	with Firebeatz featuring Little Giants
"Higher"	2017	Spinnin' Records	with Ummet Ozcan
"You Don't Have to Like It"	2018	Spinnin' Records	with Janieck
"Source"	2018	Spinnin' Records	
"I Could Be Wrong"	2018	Spinnin' Records	with Brandy
"Anywhere"	2018	Spinnin' Records	
"Home"	2018	Spinnin' Records	
"With You"	2018	Spinnin' Records	
"Do It Right"	2018	Spinnin' Records	with Breathe Carolina and Sunstars
"Where Have You Gone (Anywhere)"	2018	Spinnin' Records	
"Adagio for Strings"	2018	Spinnin' Records	
"Lunar"	2019	Spinnin' Records	with Madison Mars
"Say Something"	2019	Spinnin' Records	
"Don't Give Up on Me"	2019	Armind	with Armin van Buuren featuring Josh Cumbee
"Inception"	2019	Spinnin' Records	
"Long Way Home"	2019	Spinnin' Records	with Deepend
"Why Can't You See"	2019	Spinnin' Records	
"Perfect"	2019	Spinnin' Records	featuring Haris
"Do It for You"	2020	Rave Culture	with W&W
"The World"	2020	Spinnin' Records	with Sander van Doorn
"I Want It All"	2021	Spinnin' Records	
"Get Together"	2021	Spinnin' Records	
"Paper Planes"	2021	Spinnin' Records	with Tungevaag
"Anywhere with You"	2021	Wall Recordings	with Afrojack and DubVision
"Alien"	2021	Spinnin' Records	with Galantis and Ilira
"Set You Free"	2022	Tomorrowland Music	featuring Laura White
"Give Me Your Love"	2022	Spinnin' Records	with MARF
"Summer.mp3"	2022	Spinnin' Records	with RetroVision
"Feel My Love"	2022	Spinnin' Records	with DubVision (feat. Joe Taylor)
"Summer Love"	2022	Spinnin' Records	"Summer.mp3" vocal version. with RetroVision (feat. Erich Lennig)
"Every Day"	2022	Spinnin' Records	with CRCLE
"SICK"	2022	Tomorrowland Music	
"If It Ain't Love"	2022	Spinnin' Records	with 4 Strings (feat. Lagique)
"Rage"	2022	Spinnin' Records	
"Lions Roar"	2022	Spinnin' Records	(feat. Philip Strand)
"After Midnight"	2023	Spinnin' Records	with Yves V (feat. Xoro)
"Warp"	2023	Spinnin' Records	
"Careful What You Wish For"	2023	Spinnin' Records	(feat. Alida)
"Best of Me"	2023	Spinnin' Records	with Philip Strand
"LFG"	2023	Spinnin' Records	

=== Remixes ===
Artist	Track	Released	Record label
Sick Individuals	"The Funky House Anthem"	2011	Sneakerz Muzik
Christian Arenas	"Warm Up!"	2012	Housepital Records
Aad Mouthaan	"Love Juice"	2012	Housepital Records
Muzikjunki, Carlos Roll and Toni Maravillas	"Alive"	2012	Housepital Records
Red Carpet	"Alright 2014"	2014	Hotfingers
Ruffneck	"Everybody Be Somebody"	2014	Real Time Records
Sick Individuals	"Wasting Moonlight"	2014	Armada
Rockefeller	"Do It 2 Nite"	2015	Spinnin' Deep
Kraak & Smaak	"Mountain Top"	2015	Spinnin' Remixes
Showtek featuring MC Ambush	"90s By Nature"	2015	Skink
Felix Jaehn featuring Linying and Lost Frequencies	"Eagle Eyes"	2015	Spinnin' Deep
The Magician	"Together"	2016	Potion
Kraantje Pappie	"Opgeturnt"	2017	Spinnin' Remixes
Hardwell and Kshmr	"Power"	2017	Self-released
Robin Schulz featuring Erika Sirola	"Speechless"	2018	Warner Music Group
David Guetta featuring Bebe Rexha and J Balvin	"Say My Name"	2018	Warner Music Group
Armin van Buuren featuring Matluck	"Don't Let Me Go"	2020	Armada
Bassjackers	"All My Life"	2020	Spinnin' Records
Kiesza	"Love Me With Your Lie"	2020	Zebra Spirit Tribe
Illenium, Dabin, and Lights	"Hearts on Fire"	2021	12Tone Music

== Awards and nominations ==
=== DJ Magazine top 100 DJs ===
Year	Position	Notes	Ref.
2017	64	New Entry	
2018	92	Down 28	
2019	78	Up 14	
2022	84	Re-entry	
2023	81	Up 3	
