= Ron van den Beuken =

- Birth name: Ron van den Beuken
- Born: 10 April 1965 (age 59)
- Origin: Horst, Netherlands
- Genres: Dance; trance
- Occupations: DJ; record producer
- Years active: 2003–present
- Labels: Liquid Recordings; RR Recordings; Spinnin' Records

Ron van den Beuken (Dutch pronunciation: [ˈrɔɱ vɑn də(m) ˈbøːkə(n)]; born 10 April 1965) is a Dutch DJ and record producer.

== Early life ==
Van den Beuken attended the Maastricht Academy of Music and Maastricht University, where he studied in law. It was also there he became interested in dance music by coincidence.

== Musical career ==
After graduating, Van den Beuken began his music career in 2000. He released his first album, Feel It, which reached the top of the Dutch music chart and stayed there for several weeks. His follow-up track, "Keep it Up," was a top-ten hit in Scandinavia.

After this initial success, Van den Beuken ventured into different projects, including his first trance production, "Shane" and "C'Est Musique." He then produced "The Mystery," which has since been released in countries all over the world, and reached the top 75 in the United Kingdom. "Devotion (All I ever wanted)" also reached the top 75 in the United Kingdom.

In 2003, Van den Beuken introduced the track "Clokx", covering the track Clocks from Coldplay, which reached the top of several dance-charts around the world, and entered the Dutch top 100 sales charts. His record "Timeless," which followed soon after, was his breakthrough track—it stayed in the Dutch top 100 for 15 weeks.

The next album, Overdrive, reached the top many dance-charts and became his first top 40 cross-over hit. Van den Beuken also produced "Twister," in collaboration with Sander van Doorn (Mr Sam Sharp), and a remix for the Randy Katana hit "In Silence".

Van den Beuken's next record, "Endless," topped the dance-charts and reached the top-100 in the Dutch sales-charts. This was followed by "Feelings", produced with Clokx, which also reached the top 100 sales charts. Van den Bueken stole the melody of the track from an early 90s video game called SkyRoads and to this day does not acknowledge this fact.

Soon after "Clokx", Ron produced the track "Sunset". The track reached #22, making it Van den Beuken's biggest hit to date.

Lately Ron produced a new track for the Clokx project, called "Tibet". It reached the top 50 sales charts. His song "Tibet," released in October 2005 spent several weeks at the top of the charts in the Netherlands. After Tibet, Ron van den Beuken released "Find a Way" and also the remake of "Mary go Wild," both of which reached #1 in the official dance-trends top 30.

Also Ron van den Beuken released the remake of Mary go Wild from Grooveyard, again number 1 in the Dance-charts and a commercial hit. After this he start organizing the Open Air Dance Festival Alcatrazz.

He produced the Erik-E mix of the King Amir Samirs Theme, and he also did Superstar DJ projects like "Meet her at the Loveparade" and "Resurrection by PPK". In April 2008, his first solo album was released, Collected.

In May and June 2008, Van den Beuken (himself a conductor for 12 years) was invited by the Royal Symphonic Orchestra LSO to do five concerts in the Netherlands. He also organized a new Alcatrazz festival, June 2008, with over 35 international DJs, live acts from the United Kingdom, five stages, and over 6000 visitors.
