= Denza (musician) =

- Also known as: Denza
- Born: Dimitri van Bronswijk; March 14, 1993 (age 33)
- Origin: Nunspeet, The Netherlands
- Genres: Hardstyle, Hard Dance
- Occupations: Producer; DJ; Musician
- Years active: 2009 - present
- Labels: 2-Dutch; Be Yourself Music; Dirty Workz
- Website: http://www.djdenza.com/

Dimitri van Bronswijk (born March 14, 1993), known professionally as Denza, is a Dutch music producer. His obsession for the Harder Styles convinced him to produce music himself in 2009.

In the beginning of 2013, Marcel Woods of 2-Dutch discovered Denza's tracks and signed him at his own record label Dutch Master Works. From there, Denza started to develop his own sound - Euphoric Hardstyle - which reached the ears of Q-dance, Scantraxx, and Be Yourself Music. After that, Denza released his music on Derailed Traxx, X-Bone, and Gearbox. Denza signed with Dirty Workz at the start of 2016.

== Discography ==
=== Singles ===
Artist(s)	Song title	Label	Genre	Date
Denza	Hands Up	Dirty Workz	Hardstyle	30/03/2016
Denza	Memories	X-Bone Records	Hardstyle	04/11/2015
Denza	Moments	Be Yourself Music	Hardstyle	14/09/2015
Denza	Stellar	Dutch Master Works	Hardstyle	13/07/2015
Denza	Universe	Dutch Master Works	Hardstyle	01/12/2014
Denza	Shine	Dutch Master Works	Hardstyle	24/02/2014
Denza	Get No Party	Dutch Master Works	Hardstyle	19/04/2013

=== Remixes ===
Artist(s)	Song title	Remixer(s)
Afrojack & Wrabel	Ten Feet Tall	Denza & Humanoise
