= Trumpsta =

Single by Contiez featuring Treyy G
- Released: May 2013
- Recorded: 2013
- Genre: House, Melbourne Bounce, EDM
- Label: PhetHouse Records
- Songwriters: Treyy Garrett; James Contes

Contiez singles chronology
"/"	"Trumpsta"

Treyy G singles chronology
"/"	"Trumpsta" (2013)

"Trumpsta" is the first major hit by Australian DJ and record producer Contiez. The single features Treyy G. It was released in May 2013 on the EP I'm Mr. Trumpsta, which contained the following remixes:

1. "Trumpsta" [Djuro Remix] (4:18)
2. "Trumpsta" [Mobin Master vs Tate Strauss Remix] (4:01)
3. "Trumpsta" [Dirty Palm Remix] (6:31)
4. "Trumpsta" [Stevie Mink Remix] (5:33)
5. "Trumpsta" [NYMZ Remix] (3:36)

== Charts ==
The single reached number 3 in Sverigetopplistan, the official Swedish Singles Chart, and also charted in Norway, Denmark and Finland.

=== Weekly charts ===
Chart (2013)	Peak position
Austria (Ö3 Austria Top 40)	75
Denmark (Tracklisten)	17
Finland (Suomen virallinen lista)	14
Norway (VG-lista)	12
Sweden (Sverigetopplistan)	3

=== Year-end charts ===
Chart (2013)	Position
Sweden (Sverigetopplistan)	11
Chart (2014)	Position
Sweden (Sverigetopplistan)	69

== Certifications ==
Region	Certification	Certified units/sales
Norway (IFPI Norway)	8× Platinum	80,000^{‡}
Sweden (GLF)	3× Platinum	120,000^{‡}
Streaming
Denmark (IFPI Danmark)	2× Platinum	3,600,000^{†}
^{‡} Sales+streaming figures based on certification alone.^{†} Streaming-only figures based on certification alone.
