= TW Steel =

Dutch watchmaker

- Industry: Watch manufacturing
- Founded: 2005
- Founder: Jordy Cobelens, Ton Cobelens
- Headquarters: Amsterdam, Netherlands
- Key people: Jordy Cobelens, CEO; Ton Cobelens, Chief Design Officer
- Products: Wristwatches
- Website: twsteel.com

TW Steel is a Dutch watchmaker known for its large, oversized watches and chronographs. The company was established in 2005 by father and son team Jordy & Ton Cobelens in the Netherlands.

== History ==
The company was founded in 2005 by Jordy Cobelens along with his father Ton Cobelens, and they celebrated their 5th anniversary on the 20th of June (2010) at The Bloomingdale Club at Bloemendaal, North Holland.
The father and son team has a history with watches which began in 1980 when Ton became a Raymond Weil & Maurice Lacroix distributor for the Benelux region, this being when Ton started designing private label watches for airlines such as KLM & Martinair. Ton went on to start a promotions and advertising company which created campaigns for the Swatch group in the Benelux before selling this company to design and market a small Swiss-made watch which was popular in the Netherlands and other parts of Europe. In 2005 TW Steel was born with his son Jordy as the CEO.

== Current models ==
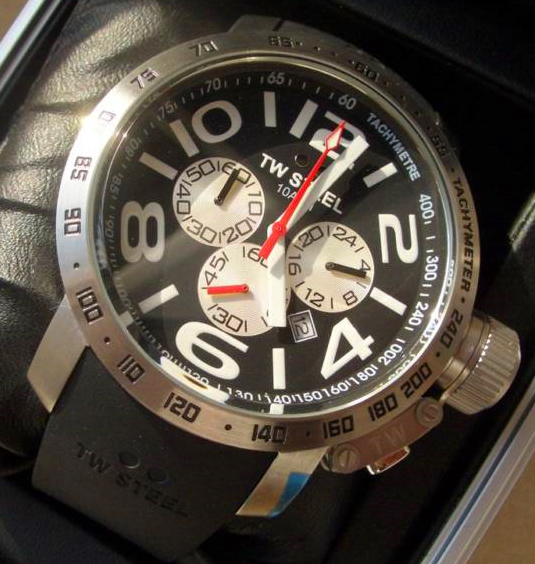
48mm Grandeur TW41.

TW Steel watches use Japanese automatic movements from Citizen Miyota and Swiss quartz movements from Ronda.

TW Steel's range of watches come largely in 45 mm and 50 mm diameter variants made from stainless steel. The "Canteen" models feature a crown cap attached by a "hook" or "hinge" to the side of the watch case. At BASELWORLD 2011, TW Steel launched its new CEO (Collection ExtraOrdinary) Goliath collection, which is a more formal, dress-look for the brand. This also makes it perfect to be worn at the office grounds. The collection also introduced Swiss Made watches to the TW Steel line, with the CE3015, a Swiss-made watch with a Swiss Ronda 585 caliber movement.

== Sponsorship ==
TW Steel has many brand ambassadors such as Kelly Rowland, David Coulthard, Mitchell Niemeyer, Mick Doohan and Dario Franchitti who are regularly seen wearing the watches on TV and taking part in various promotional activities. TW Steel also sponsors the 2010 Renault F1 team, and has created several F1 special editions with Renault F1 branding. They also sponsor the WTCC driver Tom Coronel. In 2011 and 2012 the allegiance moved on to the Lotus F1 team and its drivers can be seen sporting TW Steel watches whenever they achieve podium finishes. The TW Steel logo features on the driver's overalls and F1 car rearview mirrors. TW Steel sponsored the 2013 Sahara Force India F1 team, and its drivers can be seen sporting TW Steel watches whenever they achieve podium finishes. The TW Steel logo features on the drivers' overalls and F1 cars.

Also in 2014, TW Steel sponsored the Daytona DMAX Championship, run by the Daytona Group / Daytona Motorsport.
