= Wulf (singer) =

Dutch musician

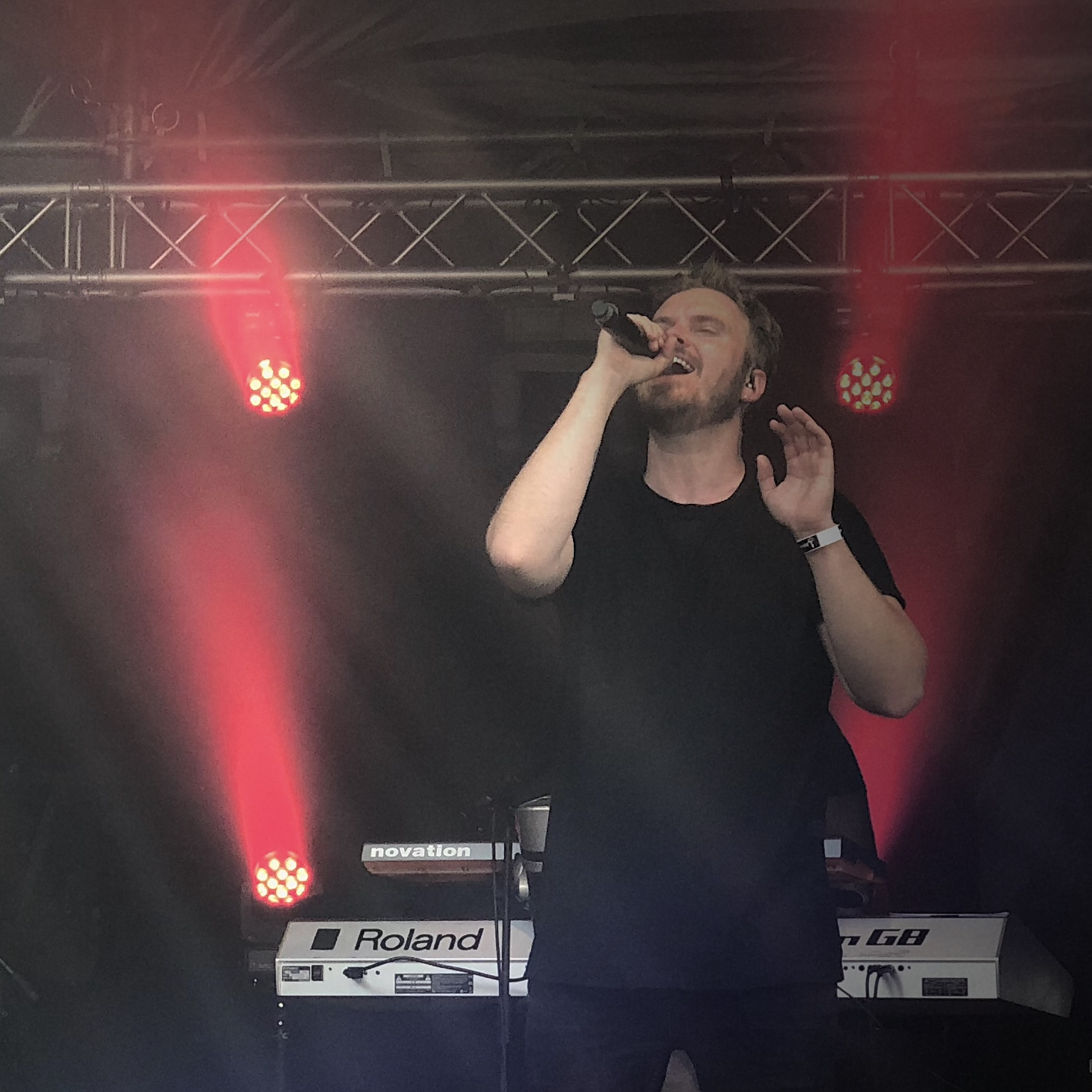
- Wulf at Parkfeest 2018

Background information
- Born: Lieuwe Albertsma; 1987 (age 38–39); Weesp, Netherlands
- Occupations: Singer, songwriter
- Years active: 2016–present
- Label: 8ball

Lieuwe Albertsma (born 1987 in Weesp, Netherlands), known by his stage name Wulf, is a Dutch musician.

== Career ==
In 2012 he participated in The Voice of Holland, failing to get past the auditions stage.

Wulf performed as an interval act at the Eurovision Song Contest 2021 final in Rotterdam alongside Afrojack and Glennis Grace with a pre-recorded version of Afrojack's "Ten Feet Tall" on the Erasmus Bridge.

== Discography ==
=== Singles ===
==== As lead artist ====
Title	Year	Peak chart positions		Certifications	Album
Title	Year	NLD	BEL (FL)	Certifications	Album
"Mind Made Up"	2017	62	28 (Tip)	NVPI: Gold	Switching Gears
"All Things Under the Sun"	2018	55	22 (Tip)	NVPI: Gold	Switching Gears

==== As featured artist ====
Title	Year	Peak chart positions		Album
Title	Year	NLD	BEL (FL)	Album
"Summer On You" (with Sam Feldt and Lucas & Steve)	2016	12	12 (Tip)	Non-album single
