= Mitchell Niemeyer =

Dutch musician

- Born: Mitchell Niemeijer; 17 February 1988 (age 37); Amsterdam, Netherlands
- Genres: House, electro house
- Occupation(s): Disc jockey, record producer, songwriter
- Years active: 2010–present
- Labels: Spinnin Records, Sony Music, Steel Music
- Website: www.mitchellniemeyer.com

Mitchell Niemeyer (born February 7, 1988, in Amsterdam, Netherlands) is a DJ/Producer. Working in house music he has played gigs in Las Vegas, Los Angeles, London, Miami, Brazil and Hong Kong.

== Biography ==
Mitchell Niemeyer was raised in Amsterdam in the neighbourhood of “Jordaan”. It was here that he was exposed to all kinds of music, and where he became a DJ/Producer. Niemeyer has played every big festival in the Netherlands and surrounding countries, these have included Tomorrowland (BE), Mysteryland, Solar Festival and he has been in every Dirty Dutch line-up world-wide.

In 2013 Niemeyer released his first big single, a collaboration with Jonathan Mendelsohn, known for his work with Laidback Luke and Dash Berlin. Besides this single, he is working on new collaborations with multiple international artists, including former Destiny Child lead singer Kelly Rowland, who has already achieved house hits with artists such as David Guetta, announcing the collaboration with Mitchell Niemeyer personally via YouTube. In addition to the Kelly Rowland collaboration Niemeyer is working with artists such as Estelle, Chris Willis and the Nervo Twins.

In 2013 it was announced that he would become an official global ambassador for the Dutch watch brand TW Steel.

In November 2013 Mitchell Niemeyer's single #Pantsdown with The Partysquad hit the overall top 10 chart at Beatport.com The single reached until the number 6 spot in this top 10.

== Discography ==
Singles

The Partysquad & Mitchell Niemeyer - #Pantsdown (2013)

Mitchell Niemeyer & Jonathan Mendelsohn - Hollywood (2013)

Gregor Salto & Mitchell Niemeyer - Just Yeah (2015)

Remixes

Madcon ft Kelly Rowland - One Life (Mitchell Niemeyer Remix) (2013)

Club tracks

- Mitchell Niemeyer - Debut (2011)
- Mitchell Niemeyer - Universal Rhythm (2011)
- Mitchell Niemeyer - Botox (2012)
- Delivio Reavon & Aaron Gill ft Mitchell Niemeyer - Rock Paper Scissors (2012)
- Mitchell Niemeyer - Starscream (2012)
- Mitchell Niemeyer - Radar (2012)
