= Guardian Angel (K-System song) =

Single by K-System

from the album Sleep Is the Enemy
- Released: 11 February 2004
- Genre: Electronic, trance
- Length: 3:08
- Label: Bonnier Amigo Music Group
- Songwriter(s): Thomas Deegrind: Kimmo Kauppinen

Music video
- "Guardian Angel" on YouTube

"Guardian Angel" is a single by Finnish DJ K-System. It was released in February 2004, from K-System's album Sleep Is the Enemy. The single has been immensely popular in Finland, having spent 18 weeks on the Finnish Dance Charts, peaking at number one. It was also very popular among DJs in Scandinavia, and a competition was put in place in 2004, in search of the best remix of the track.

== Vocals ==
- Christa Renwall – a female singer who has worked with other DJs, including Slow. Renwall is also a member of the Finnish acoustic/rock/folk band Acorn.
- Johanna Sandell – a female singer who has done vocal work in other popular Scandinavian dance hits.

== Sleep Is the Enemy track listing ==
1. L.O.V.E. (A Little Piece of Heaven)
2. Guardian Angel
3. Oldschool
4. Dream My Dream
5. Sound of Arena
6. Goanna
7. Do You Wanna Ride?
8. Speedfreaks
9. Magic Sunrise
10. Sleep Flower

Bonus tracks:

- Sound of Arena (Remix) – Liquid M
- Guardian Angel (Remix) – Cosmicman
