= Supernature =

Supernature may refer to:

- Supernature (Cerrone III), a 1977 album by Cerrone
  - "Supernature" (song), the title track, covered by Erasure
- Supernature (Inkubus Sukkubus album), 2001
- Supernature (Goldfrapp album), 2005
- Supernature, a 1973 book by Lyall Watson
- "Supernature", a song by Sharon Needles from the album Taxidermy
- Ricky Gervais: SuperNature, a 2022 Netflix stand-up comedy show

== See also ==
- Supernatural (disambiguation)
