= Dirty Workz =

Belgian record label

- [[
- Founded: 2006
- Founder: Koen Bauweraerts (DJ Coone)
- Genre: Hardstyle, Jumpstyle, Happy hard
- Country of origin: Belgium
- Official website: http://www.dirtyworkz.com/

Dirty Workz is a Belgian hardstyle, jumpstyle and happy hard record label founded in 2006 by Koen Bauweraerts, also known as DJ Coone. Dirty Workz is home to many famous hardstyle acts, including Da Tweekaz and Wasted Penguinz. Dirty Workz also releases many jumpstyle releases from artists like Fenix, Dr. Rude, and Demoniak. Dirty Workz is a sublabel of Toff Music, a larger Belgian label. Toff Music releases all the albums from the Dirty Workz artists, while Dirty Workz itself focuses on digital and 12 inch releases. Dirty Workz is the main label and contains different sublabels: ANARCHY, DWX Bounce and DWX Update. In 2016 a new sublabel was announced within Dirty Workz known as Wolf Clan. In 2018 the happy hard sublabel Electric Fox was announced.

== History ==
Dirty Workz was conceived and founded by Koen Bauweraerts in 2006. According to Bauweraerts, the goal was to create a platform that would give him complete creative freedom over his music and allow him to produce his own sounds. In 2008, he released the album My Dirty Workz on his label; the album reached number 13 on the Ultratop Belgian music charts that same year.

In 2009, the label organized the "Dirty Workz Deluxe" event, held on 28 November at the Lotto Arena in Antwerp.

In October 2012, the label announced the arrival of Deepack and his new EP entitled Anarchy. In July 2013, Coone collaborated with American Steve Aoki's Dim Mak Records label, in order to further popularize his label internationally. In June 2014, Dirty Workz announced that they had signed a new notorious band from the hardstyle scene, Wasted Penguinz. In early September, it was Dr. Rude's turn to join the label.

== Artists ==
=== Dirty Workz ===
- Amentis
- Bassbrain
- Coone
- Crystal Lake
- Cyber
- Da Tweekaz
- Deepack
- Denza
- Dillytek
- Dr Phunk
- Dr Rude
- Ecstatic
- Firelite
- Hard Driver
- Jay Reeve
- Jesse Jax
- JNXD
- Kane Scott
- Mandy
- MISH
- Pherato
- Phrantic
- Primeshock
- Psyko Punkz
- Public Enemies (Hard Driver & Digital Punk)
- Refuzion
- Sickddellz
- Solstice
- Sub Sonik
- Sub Zero Project
- Sylence
- The Elite (Alias of Coone, Hard Driver, Da Tweekaz)
- TNT (Technoboy 'N' Tuneboy)
- Wasted Penguinz
- WDM
- Xception
- Zatox

=== DWX Update ===
- Aria
- Blasco
- Forever Lost
- Heatwavez
- Horyzon
- Serzo
- Soren
- Strixter
- Synthsoldier
- Yuta Imai

=== Wolf Clan ===
- Rize
- TALON
- Teknoclash

=== Audiophetamine ===
- Audiofreq

=== Electric Fox ===
- Darren Styles
- Jakka-B
- Mike Enemy
- Mike Reverie
- Tatsunoshin
- Technikore
- Tweekacore (Alias of Da Tweekaz)
- Quickdrop
