= Contiez =

Australian DJ and music producer

- Born: James Contez
- Occupation: DJ
- Years active: 2012-present

James Contez, better known as Contiez, is a Melbourne-based Australian DJ and music producer in the House/Trap/Dance genres. He is best known for his single "Trumpsta" featuring Treyy G, which peaked at number 3 in Sweden.

== Discography ==
=== Singles ===
Year	Single	Peak positions					Certification	Album
Year	Single	AUT	DEN	FIN	NOR	SWE	Certification	Album
2013	"Trumpsta" (feat. Treyy G)	75	17	13	12	3		I'm a Trumpsta EP

Others

- 23 April 2012: Access EP [Preston Recordings]
- 15 May 2012: Rock It EP [Club Cartel Records]
- 21 May 2012: "Paradiso" [Vinyl Pusher]
- 6 August 2012: "E=3" [Vinyl Pusher]
- 20 August 2012: Freakin' (Remixes) (Safari Weapons 5) [Safari Music]
- 29 August 2012: More Than Just a Martian EP [Preston Recordings]
- 6 December 2012: I'm a Trumpsta EP [PhetHouse Records]
- 29 April 2013: Trumpsta Remixes (feat. Treyy G) [Safari Music]
- 3 June 2013: "Don't Bother" [hi-tech Records]
- 1 July 2013: "Lady Funk" (with Treyy G) [Shabang Records]
- 22 July 2013: Time Wasters EP [Hype Recordings]
