= Wasted Penguinz =

Swedish DJ and hardstyle producer

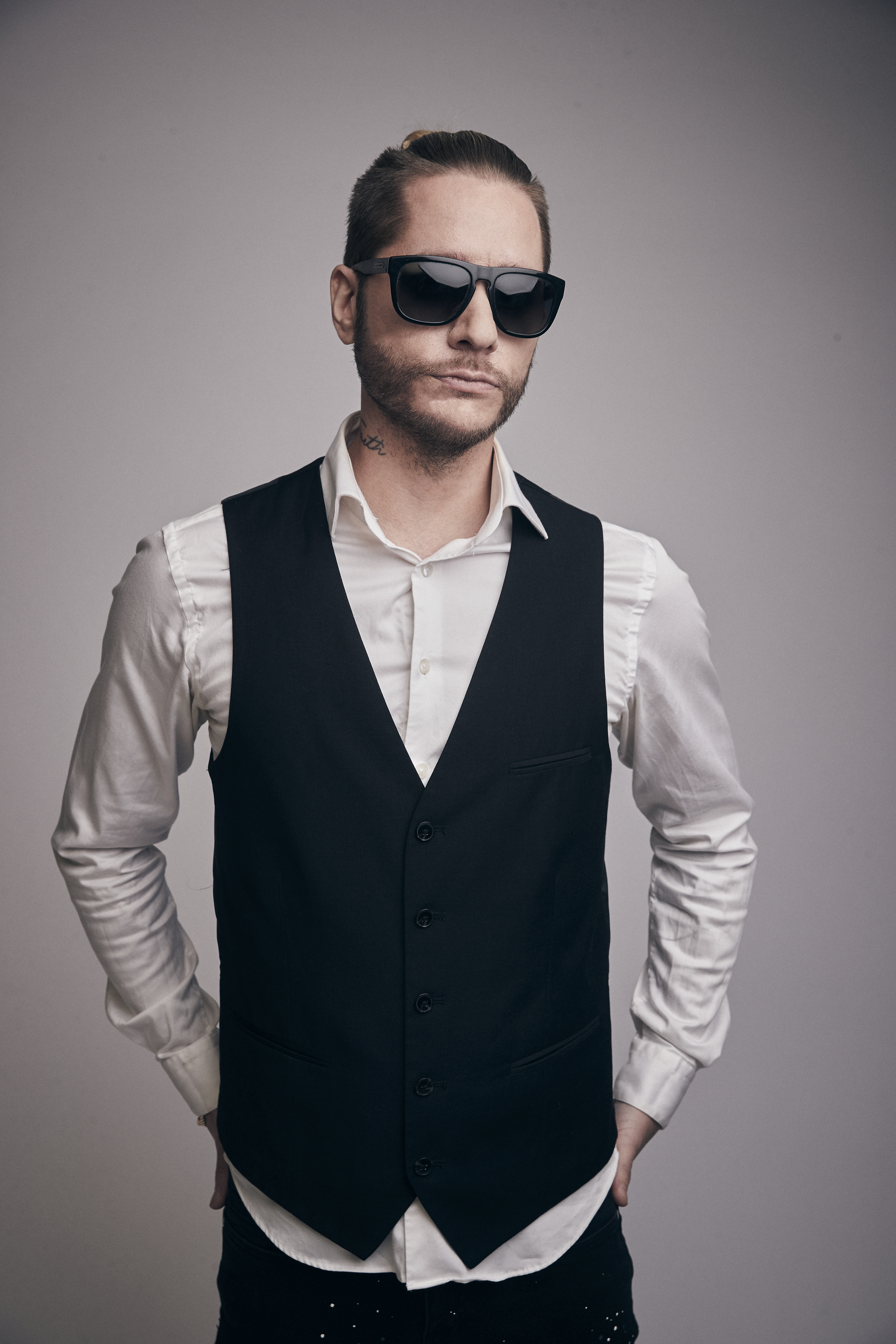
- Pontuz Bergman, Wasted Penguinz.

Background information
- Origin: Helsingborg, Sweden
- Genre: Hardstyle
- Years active: 2008–present
- Labels: Bazz Implant Records (2009); Scantraxx (2010–2012); Toff Music (2013-2014); Dirty Workz (2014–present)
- Website: www.wastedpenguinz.com

Pontuz Bergman (stage name Wasted Penguinz) is a Swedish DJ and hardstyle producer. Wasted Penguinz was originally a duo act that consisted of Bergman and Jon Brandt-Cederhäll, who left the act in 2020.

Wasted Penguinz was previously signed at Scantraxx, before moving over to Toff Music where they released their debut album, Wistfulness, in 2013. They subsequently moved to Toff Music child label Dirty Workz, where they released two further albums in the mid-late 2010s.

Their music has been labelled as "Euphoric Hardstyle", with more of a focus on emotional melodies than other artists. Themes of mental health, personal struggle, love, loss and hope are prevalent in their music, evidenced by track titles such as "Anxiety", "Melancholia", "Wait for You" and "Make It One Day".

== Career ==
=== 2008-10: Origin, Signing to Scantraxx Recordz ===
Much like many other hardstyle duos of their generation, Pontuz Bergman and Jon Brandt-Cederhäll met each other over an online forum in 2008. Prior to forming Wasted Penginz, both produced Eurodance music, but focussed their efforts into hardstyle after commencing the musical project together.

Two years after the group was founded, Wasted Penguinz were signed to a major Dutch label, Scantraxx, in the summer of 2010. Their first Scantraxx release was on June 18, 2010. This release contained two tracks, "I'm Free" and "Anxiety", and was released on Scantraxx Silver. Their second release on Scantraxx Silver was in October 2010, containing the tracks "Hate Mondayz" and "Resistance".

All the tracks on both of their first two Scantraxx releases reached the "Hardstyle Top 100 of 2010" list from Fear.fm, the then-largest radio station devoted to harder styles of dance music. "Resistance" reached position 11, "Anxiety" reached position 23, "I'm Free" at 37, and finally "Hate Mondayz" at position 49. They also won the "Best New Face" award from Fear.fm. Fear.fm interviewed Bergman & Brandt-Cederhäll, who revealed that they were in contact with Scantraxx since December 2009, and it was only made official in the summer of 2010.

=== 2011-13: Moving to Toff Music ===
Following their early years, their brand image began to centre around consuming large amounts of beer, with their motto/tagline being "Get Wasted N' Do It". On stage, they took a charismatic, laidback approach to performing, describing themselves as "two crazy guys drinking beer", as opposed to the more serious, composed performances from other popular DJs at the time. They also established a reputation for wearing costumes during some of their sets. The Wasted Penguinz' YouTube channel used to upload song previews, as well as videos of drinking contests and drinking games. The pair later admitted they had taken their love for alcohol too far during this period of their careers, and they had suffered from alcoholism as a result.

In 2011, they were booked for three major Dutch festivals in the summer: Intents Festival in Oisterwijk, Defqon.1 Festival in Biddinghuizen and Q-Base. The summer saw many new releases from the duo, all of which were released on Scantraxx. The following year, they told DJ Mag that their bookings doubled, and they had seized upon the momentum of having new tracks and collaborations to play in their sets. However, during the 2012 festival season, the duo also announced their departure from record label Scantraxx via their Facebook page.

Late in 2012, the duo was revealed to have been selected in the DJ Mag Top 100 DJs list for the first time. They polled at 75th place, and also revealed that they had begun working on their first album.

In October 2013, they signed with Toff Music and released the single "Raindropz". Later the same year, they released their debut album, Wistfulness on Toff Music, which received a warm reception from those in the scene. Critics were impressed with the album's emphasis on impactful euphoric and emotional sounds, especially relevant given the contrast to darker hardstyle aesthetics which had reigned over the genre only half a decade prior. In a later interview, they admitted Wistfulness wasn't planned properly, and resembled more of a compilation of different tracks they had produced in their time between labels in 2012 and 2013.

Wasted Penguinz unique style of music began to influence other artists, and marked the beginning of a sub-genre known as Euphoric Hardstyle. While many described Euphoric Hardstyle artists as "sell-outs", or artists who leant into a more commercialised sound, the duo acknowledged these critiques, but admitted the genre was always subject to change and that they were focussed on their own melodic style, instead of chasing harder, darker and faster trends apparent in more contemporary Rawstyle. At the end of 2013, it was revealed Wasted Penguinz had polled in the DJ Mag Top 100 DJs for a second consecutive, and final time in their career, coming in at 83rd place.

=== 2014-18: Dirty Workz, Further Albums ===
In 2014, the duo remixed JoeySuki and Kill The Buzz single "Life Is Calling". They then signed with the Belgian hardstyle label Dirty Workz later that same year, and released their first track on the label titled "All For Nothing". They followed this with releases in 2015 such as "Bitterness", "I Love You", "Paradise Is Lost", and finished the year with, "Inner Peace", an experimental hardstyle track. "Inner Peace" is notable as it is over 9 minutes long, far longer and with a much slower build up than most hardstyle tracks. On the track, the duo said they were looking to create a song without the typical boundaries and constraints of the genre, giving themselves license to reject the unwritten rules and expectations typically placed on them as hardstyle DJs and express themselves freely as producers.

In late November 2016, Wasted Penguinz released their second studio album and their first on Dirty Workz: Clarity. The name of the album was chosen to highlight the intentional, direct, and to the point theming of the music on the album, being a much more thought through release than their first album. Clarity consisted of 15 tracks, including a collaboration with Crisis Era and a remix of Darren Styles' 2007 happy hardcore classic "Save Me". The lead single for the album was "Make it One Day", a song which emphasised Wasted Penguinz' euphoric and uplifting hardstyle sound, and also stated their commitment to maintaining a positive outlook on life despite the duo's battles with mental health struggles. Opening up about their mental health struggles, Bergman told Partyscene:

"We both suffer from anxiety and panic attacks. I’ve been struggling with this since I was 14 years old, it’s a part of our lives and we can’t just take it away. By making music we set our feelings aside. We really put our emotions in our music and that’s why it mostly has a message. Some people go boxing when they struggle with stress or something else, to lose their frustrations. We make music."

Throughout 2016 and 2017, Wasted Penguinz teased a powerful melodic track, which was lated revealed to be a collaboration with Danish melodic hardstyle artist, Adrenalize. "Scandinavia" was released in late 2017, marking the trio's third collaborative track together.

In early 2018, after releasing two new singles, the duo announced they were working on a new album together. Elysian was released on Dirty Workz at the end of November of the same year, consisting of 12 tracks. Some of the tracks brought rawstyle sounding kicks (such as their edit of their 2011 hit "Melancholia"), although the musical foundation of the album remained the euphoric and melodic sounds they had become renowned for.

=== 2019-Present: Split of the duo, continued performances ===
On 10 February 2020, the duo announced that Brandt-Cederhäll made the decision to leave Wasted Penguinz, citing the need to take time for himself given ongoing mental health issues. After Brandt-Cederhäll left, Bergman continued the Wasted Penguinz as a solo act.

In 2023, Wasted Penguinz expressed some difficulty producing, since he didn't have the presence of another person to bounce ideas off. He also mentioned in the initial stages after Brandt-Cederhäll left the group, they didn't speak to one another. As of 2023 however, they are back on talking terms; not as producers, but just as friends. Wasted Penguinz also remains positive that he is doing well as a solo act.

In 2024, Brandt-Cederhäll was invited on stage alongside Wasted Penguinz at Melodic Madness, a small indoor euphoric hardstyle event. While he is still releasing new music, as of writing, he is primarily booked at classics events (such as VWAB), which celebrate hardstyle music from years gone by.

Towards the end of the festival season in 2026, Wasted Penguinz published a youtube video, announcing he was going to take a break from performing and touring, with his final show for the year being Melodic Madness. He cited ongoing issues with his mental health, a recurring theme throughout his career. While he was hesitant on labelling a specific date for his return, Wasted Penguinz made it clear that the break was only temporary, and he wished to return to touring at some point in the future.

== Releases ==
(white labels are not listed)

| Year | Title |
|---|---|
| 2009 | We Live For The Day EP: Release: January 28; Label: Bazz Implant Records; Formats: 12″ |
| 2009 | A Next Generation: Release: August 27; Label: Bazz Implant Records; Formats: 12″ |
| 2010 | I'm Free/Anxiety: Release: June 18; Label: Scantraxx Silver; Formats: Digital Download |
| 2010 | Resistance/Hate Mondayz: Release: October 8; Label: Scantraxx Silver; Formats: Digital Download |
| 2011 | Lost In Eternity EP: Release: June 20; Label: Scantraxx; Formats: Digital Download |
| 2011 | Crea Diem: Release: June 20; Label: Scantraxx; Formats: Digital Download |
| 2011 | Melancholia/Far From Reality: Release: August 15; Label: Scantraxx; Formats: Digital Download |
| 2011 | Stay Alive/Circle Of Life: Release: September 26; Label: Scantraxx; Formats: Digital Download |
| 2012 | Within/Freedom Is Me: Release: February 8; Label: Scantraxx; Formats: Digital Download |
| 2013 | Raindropz: Release: September 10; Label: Toff Music; Formats: Digital Download |
| 2013 | Wistfulness: Release: October 24; Label: Toff Music; Formats: Digital Download, CD |
| 2016 | Clarity: Label: Toff Music; Formats: Digital Download |
| 2018 | Elysian: Release: November 30; Label: Toff Music; Formats: Digital Download |
| 2020 | Perspective: Release: March 6; Label: Toff Music; Formats: Digital Download |
| 2020 | I'm Still Here: Release: July 31; Label: Dirty Workz / Toff Music; Formats: Digital Download |
| 2020 | Life Support: Release: November 13; Label: Dirty Workz / Toff Music; Formats: Digital Download |
