= Pep & Rash =

Dutch DJ and production duo

- Origin: Goes, Zeeland, Netherlands
- Genres: Progressive house; Future house; Bass house; House
- Years active: 2013–present
- Labels: Spinnin' Records, Spinnin' Deep
- Members: Jesse van de Ketterij; Rachid El Uarichi
- Website: pepandrash.com/

Pep & Rash is a Dutch DJ and production duo from Goes, a small town in Zeeland, composed of Jesse van de Ketterij and Rachid El Uarichi.

== Discography ==
=== Charting singles ===
| Year | Title | Peak chart positions | | Album |
| Year | Title | BEL | UK | Album |
|---|---|---|---|---|
| 2015 | "Rumors" | 63 | 17 | Non-album singles |
| 2016 | "Love The One You're With" | 79 | — | Non-album singles |
"—" denotes a recording that did not chart or was not released in that territory.

=== Other Singles ===
- 2013: Rocksus [NewLight Records]
- 2013: Hai Hai Hai [Bongo Tone]
- 2013: Epifania (with Funky Ro) [Bongo Tone]
- 2013: Te Te Ma [Bongo Tone]
- 2013: Unda (with Santos Suarez) [Moganga]
- 2014: Fatality (Quintino Edit) [SPRS]
- 2015: Rumors [Spinnin' Deep]
- 2015: Red Roses [Spinnin' Records]
- 2015: Red Roses (Let Her Go) (Vocal Edit) [Spinnin' Records]
- 2015: Sugar (with Shermanology) [Spinnin' Deep]
- 2015: White Rabbit (with Sander van Doorn) [Spinnin' Records]
- 2016: Love The One You're With [Spinnin' Records]
- 2016: Enigma (with Lucas & Steve) [Spinnin' Records]
- 2016: Echo (with Polina) [Spinnin' Records]
- 2017: The Stars Are Mine (with Chocolate Puma) [Spinnin' Deep]
- 2017: Feel Alive (with Lucas & Steve) [Spinnin' Records]
- 2017: Break Down (featuring D-Double) [Musical Freedom]
- 2017: Underground [Future House Music]
- 2017: Ruff Like This (with Watermät) [Spinnin' Deep]
- 2018: Bombaclat [Spinnin' Records]
- 2018: Together Forever (with Chocolate Puma) [Spinnin' Records]
- 2019: Bang Beatz [Musical Freedom]
- 2019: Guestlist (with Bram Fidder) [Spinnin' Deep]
- 2019: Gold Rush (featuring PolyAnna & Nomad) [Spinnin' Records]
- 2019: Da Fck You Lookin At!
- 2019: Waiting For A Sign [Spinnin' Records]
- 2020: Are You Down [Heldeep Records]
- 2022: Jimmy Choo [Heldeep Records]

=== Remixes ===
- 2013: Jay Ennes, Troy Denari - When You Say This (Pep & Rash UK Mix) [Madhouse Records]
- 2013: Santos Suarez - Pipa (Pep & Rash Remix) [Bongo Tone]
- 2014: R3hab, Trevor Guthrie - Soundwave [Spinnin' Remixes]
- 2015: Tchami featuring Kaleem Taylor - Promesses (Pep & Rash Remix) [Fool's Gold Records]
- 2015: Alesso - Sweet Escape (Pep & Rash Remix) [Refune Records]
- 2015: Hardwell, Headhunterz featuring Haris - Nothing Can Hold Us Down (Pep & Rash Remix) [Revealed Recordings]
- 2017: The Knocks featuring Sam Nelson Harris - HEAT (Pep & Rash Remix) [Big Beat/Neon Gold]
