= I Wear* Experiment =

Estonian musical group

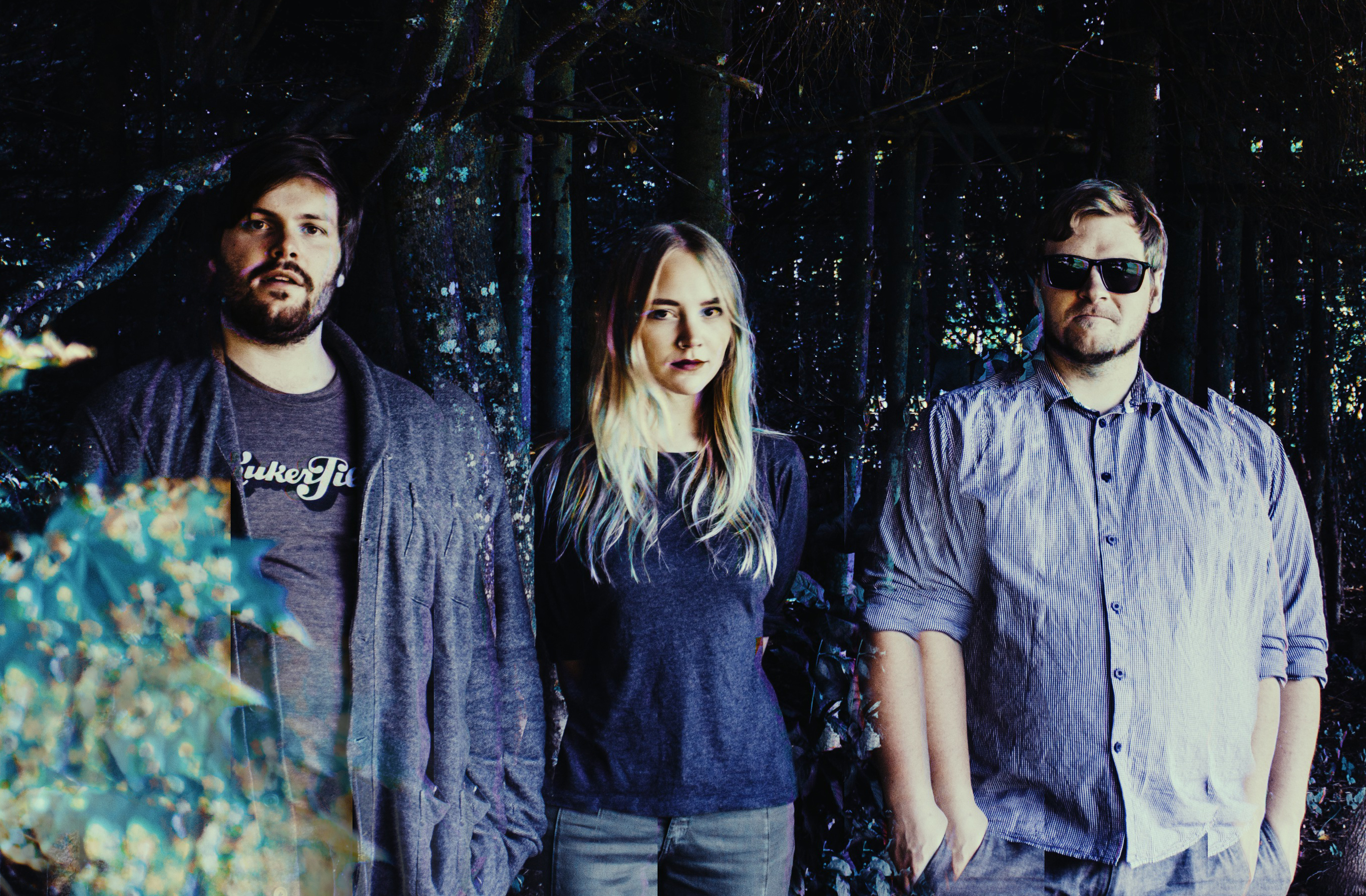
- I Wear* Experiment 2016

Background information
- Origin: Estonia, Tallinn
- Genres: Alternative rock; pop rock; indie rock; electropop
- Years active: 2012–present
- Members: Johanna Eenma; Hando Jaksi
- Website: Official website

I Wear* Experiment is an Estonian rock band formed in 2012. Their sound leans towards experimentation and cinematic soundscapes. The band members are Johanna Eenma (vocals/keyboards)and Hando Jaksi (guitars/synths/sampler). The band began their journey into electronical pop music at the beginning of 2012. I Wear* Experiment has released three 3 EPs and their latest debut album “Patience” was released in 2016. The second single of the album - "Patience" was one of the finalists of Eesti Laul competition.

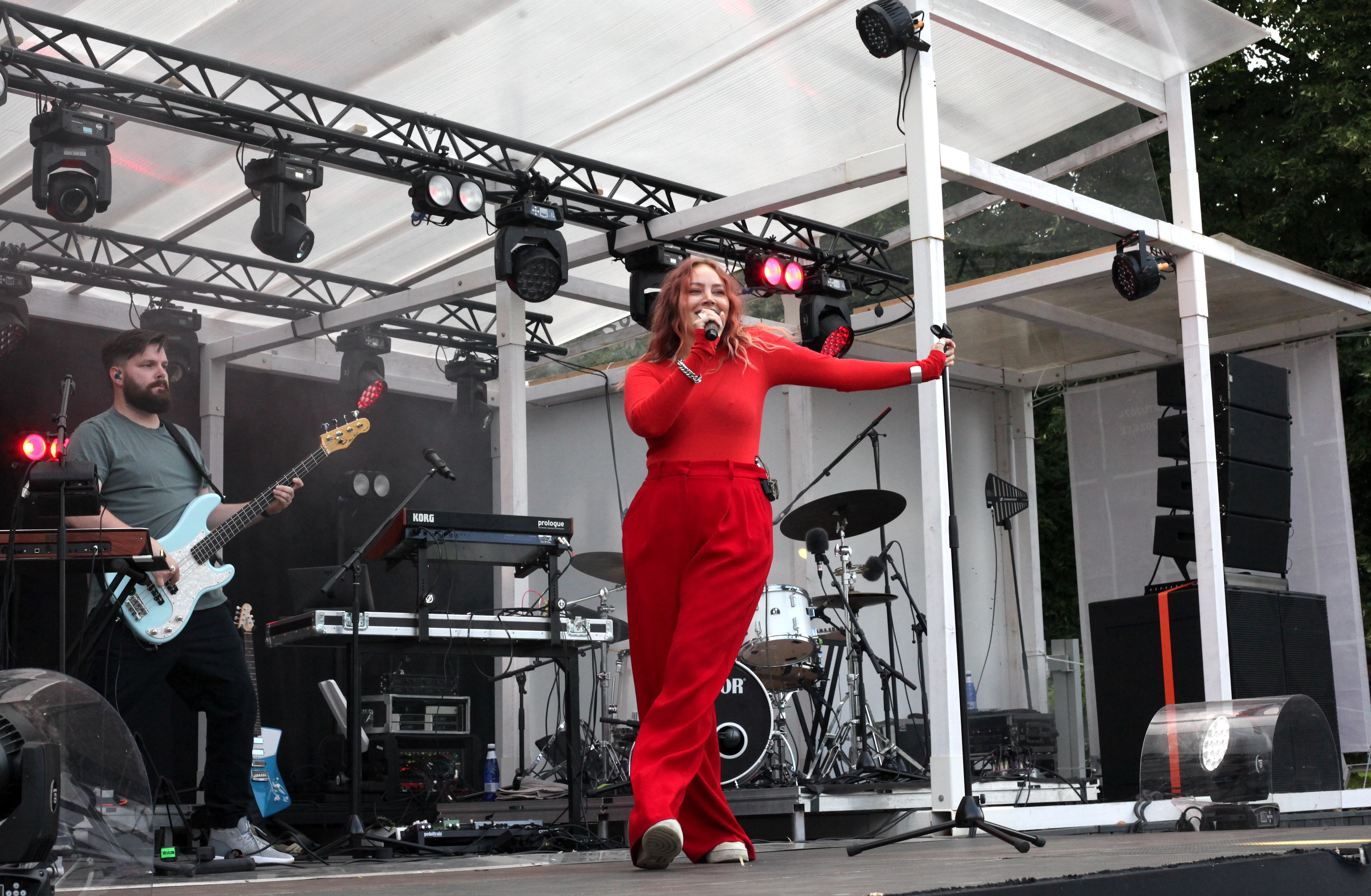
Johanna Eenma and Hando Jaksi performing in Tartu, Estonia (2024)

I Wear* Experiment has toured the Baltics and played all the major festivals in the region. In 2016, The band was chosen from 47 bands to be the support act for the Hurts in their Surrender tour. They have been featured in The Line of Best Fit, MTV Iggy and Louder Than War comparing them to the likes of Mew, Ladyhawk, M83, Cocteau Twins and Prodigy.

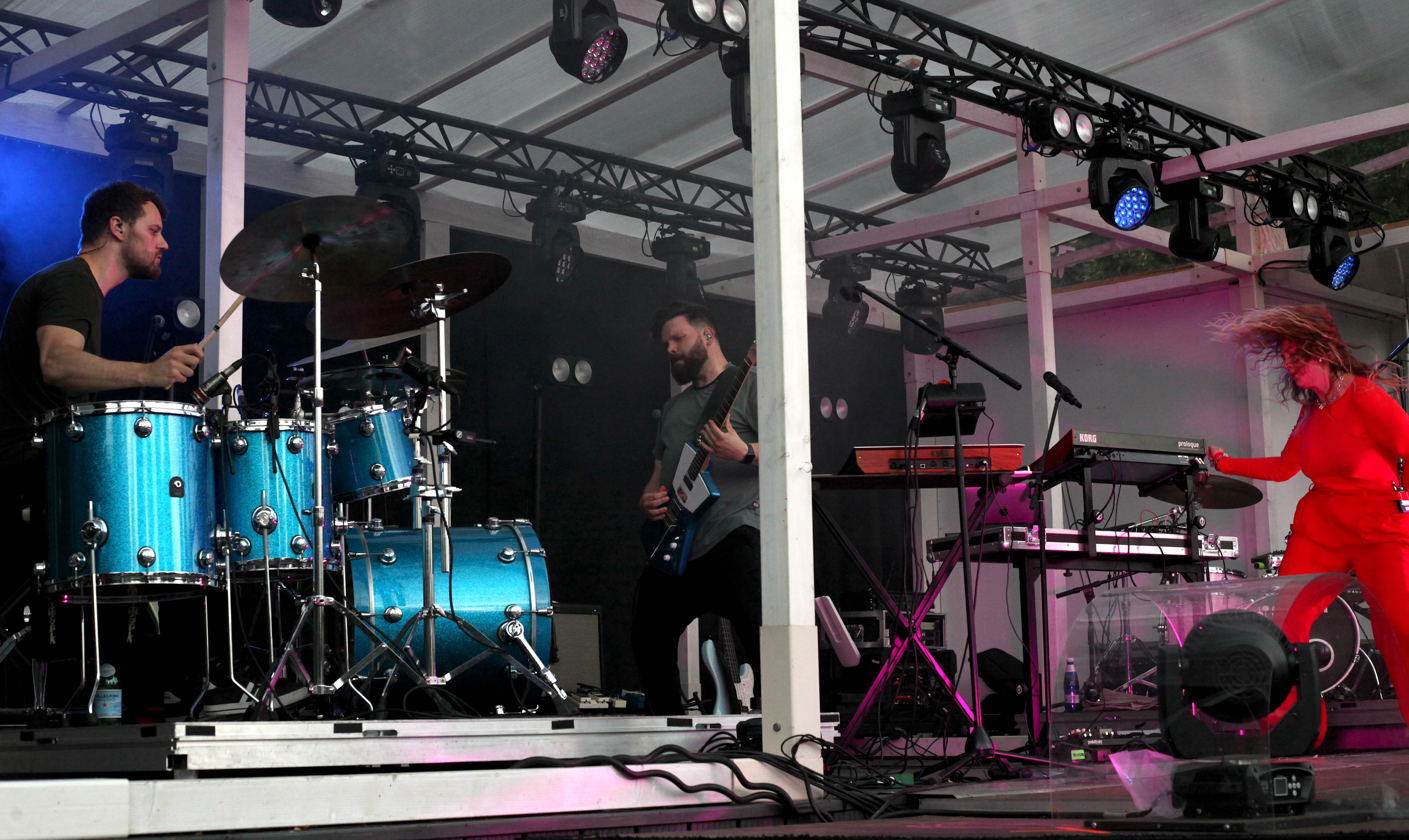
I Wear* Experiment concert Cultural Capital 2024 Tartu, Estonia. Drummer Aivar Surva, guitarist Hando Jaksi and singer Johanna Eenma

== History ==
I Wear* Experiment has performed the biggest festivals in the Baltics such as Intsikurmu Festival, Tallinn Music Week and Jazzkaar in Estonia, Positivus Festival & Summer Sound in Latvia, Karkle Live Music Beach Festival and Vilnius Music Week in Lithuania. In March 2016, the band played 3 arena shows with the British band Hurts. In August 2016, I Wear* Experiment performed at The Weekend Festival, which is the biggest electronic music festival in the Baltic countries. In October 2016, the band played in Zandari Festa, which takes place in Seoul and is the largest music showcase festival in South Korea. In September 2017, band performed in showcase festival Waves Vienna in Austria. In May 2018 the band performed at the Focus Wales Festival in the UK.

I Wear* Experiment started their first European tour in November 2016 from Stuttgart, Germany. They also had concerts in Amsterdam, Budapest, Offenbach, Prague, Berlin, Copenhagen and Warsaw. After their first European tour, I Wear* Experiment traveled to Asia early January 2017 for a mini tour. They performed 3 shows in South Korea and one show in Tokyo, Japan. In September 2017 they traveled again to Asia and gave concerts in South Korea, Japan, China and Malaysia.

The band has been a support act for several well-known bands and artists like Hurts, Kasabian, God is An Astronaut and Fish.

== Achievements ==
I Wear* Experiment has finished their debut album “Patience” which was released on April 15, 2016. On that same month Tallinn Music Week and Telliskivi Creative City awarded the band with the artist prize .

In September 2016, the album "Patience" artwork was awarded BRONZE for the Estonian Design Award.

In January 2017, "Patience" was awarded at the Estonian Music Award as “best debut album”.

== Discography ==
- "Crickets Empire I" (EP 2013)
- "Crickets Empire II" (EP 2013)
- "Crickets Empire III" (EP 2014)
- Debut album "Patience" (LP 2016)
