= Rony Rex =

Background information
- Genres: Electronic Music, House
- Occupations: DJ, Producer, Radio Host
- Years active: 2013-present
- Labels: Needwant, Youth Control, Kitsuné
- Website: https://ronyrex.com

Rony Vartio (born 20 April 1989, Helsinki) known professionally as Rony Rex is a Finnish electronic music artist, DJ, producer, event promoter and radio host based in Helsinki, Finland.

== Career ==
Vartio started his career back in 2013 and was voted as the best rising DJ in Finland in 2014. He has performed in number of Finnish music festivals such as Flow Festival, Weekend Festival, Provinssi, and Ruisrock. He previously hosted his own club concepts Floorluv (2011–2014), Lasermehu (2015–) and Talli (2017–2019).

Rony made his music debut in 2017, with the song ''Sticky Fingers''. Since then he has released music on labels such as Youth Control, Needwant, and Kitsuné. Vartio has subsequently collaborated with a number of international artists, such as Carla Monroe, girli, TT The Artist, Ravenna Golden, and Nakamura Minami. His song ''Milk It'' with Carla Monroe charted on the Billboard Dance/Mix Show Airplay Chart in 2019. In 2023, Vartio celebrated his 10-year career as Rony Rex with his debut compilation album *10*. In 2022 Vartio's label announced via social media that his song F*cked it Up (Gas Gas Remix) had been streamed over 80 million times on the Chinese music platform NetEase.

Rony hosted his own electronic music show on the Finnish Bassoradio from 2016 to 2018. In 2018, he switched over to the Finnish national radio channel YleX, where he hosts a weekly club music show.

== Discography ==
=== EPs & Albums ===
- F*cked It Up EP (2017)
- F*cked It Up (Remixes) (2017)
- Night Time CV (2021)
- Direct Me EP (2022)
- 10 (2023)
- Dopamine EP (2024)

=== Singles ===
- Voodoo (2026)
- Sticky Fingers (2017)
- Lift Yo Legs (2018)
- Lift Yo Legs (Remixed) (2018)
- Beepa (2018)
- Mona Lisa (2019)
- Milk It (2019)
- Mile High (2020)
- Cold Feet (2020)
- Snake (2020)
- The Funk (2020)
- Fabric (2021)
- Storm (2021)
- Awake Me (2021)
- Dead of Night (2021)
- Alligator (2022)
- Heat (2022)
- Direct Me (2022)
- Hyper (2022)
- Limbo (2023)
- True Religion (2023)
- Ugly (2023)
- I Could Be (2024)
- Pew / Double Up (2024)
- Too loud (2024)
- MANIMANI (2024)
- Provoke (2025)
- Cookie Junkie (2025)
- Change My Name (2025)
- Suljen Sun Suun (2025)
- Starduck (2025)
- RGB (2025)

=== Remixes ===
- Lake Jons - Colors - Rony Rex Remix (2017)
- TRU Concept - In Control - Rony Rex Remix (2019)
- Pat Lok - Know Me - Rony Rex Remix (2019)
- Keljet - Do This - Rony Rex Remix (2019)
- MKJ - Time - Rony Rex Remix (2020)
- SACRE - 09:00PM THE COCONUT BAR - Rony Rex & Kristian Lindell Remix (2020)
- warner case - in the dark - Rony Rex Remix (2020)
- Nelli Milan - Massii - Rony Rex Remix (2022)
- Aves - Gem of the ocean - Rony Rex Remix (2023)
