= K-System =

K-System is a side project by Finnish DJ and record producer, Kimmo Kauppinen. K-System was started in 1999.

== Music ==
The first single released by K-System was released in July 1999, and was called "Come to Me". The song was an immediate success, and stayed on the Finnish Dance Charts for eight weeks.

Date of Release	Title	Finnish Dance Charts	Released	Other charts
July 1999	"Come to Me"	#8	Finland	No other charts
2000	"Set U Free"	#8	Sweden, Norway, Denmark, Australia	Scandinavian, Norwegian and Swedish Dance Charts
2000	"U Gotta Love"		Finland	
2001	"Rok the Discotheque"		Finland	
2001	"SupaDupaSound"	#3	Finland, Southern Europe	Sales Chart No. 8
August – September 2003	"Sound of Arena"	#3	Scandinavia	Local Finnish Dance Charts #1; Top 30 Scandinavian Dance Charts
2003	"Dream My Dream"		Finland	Finnish Sales Charts No. 11
2004	"Guardian Angel"		Finland	Sales Charts No. 4
