= Supernaturalistic (album) =

Studio album by Sander van Doorn
- Released: 3 March 2008
- Genre: Tech trance
- Length: 57:28
- Label: Santos Records
- Producer: Sander van Doorn

Sander van Doorn chronology
Supernaturalistic (2008)	Eleve11 (2011)

Singles from Supernaturalistic
- 1. "Apple (Release Date: September 1, 2012)"; 2. "Grasshopper"; 3. "Riff"; 4. "The Bass"

Supernaturalistic is the debut album by Sander van Doorn. It was released in March 2008.

The first single from the album, "The Bass" was released on February 18 of the same year.

== Reception ==
Professional ratings
Review scores
Source	Rating
Trance.nu	3/5 stars

With the release of the album, On April 4, 2008; Tiësto presented a special program for Sander van Doorn, on show 54 Tiësto's Club Life on Radio 538. The playlist included "Look Inside Your Head", "Riff", "15", "The Bass", "Grasshopper", and "Dozer".

=== Track listing ===
ID	Name	Length
1	"Look Inside Your Head"	3:11
2	"Riff"	5:09
3	"By Any Demand"	3:24
4	"15"	5:44
5	"Pura Vida"	5:44
6	"Sushi"	5:24
7	"The Bass"	4:44
8	"Lobby"	3:14
9	"Apple"	5:38
10	"Grasshopper"	3:49
11	"Dozer"	4:46
12	"Outrospective"	6:41
