= Mayaeni =

- Birth name: Mayaeni Strauss
- Born: Detroit, Michigan
- Genres: Rock; Pop; Soul
- Occupations: Singer-songwriter; Actress; Model
- Instrument(s): Vocals, guitar
- Labels: Custard Records (2008–10); Roc Nation (2012–2018)
- Website: mayaeni.com

Mayaeni (pronounced Mah-yay-knee) is a singer-songwriter.

== Early life ==
Mayaeni was born in Detroit, to a Sierra Leonean mother and a Jewish father. Her father was a guitar player himself, who has worked with Carl Carlton and Jimmy Ruffin among others. Mayaeni has a brother, musician D. Alie of the hip-hop band United States of Mind. Through her father Mayaeni came in contact with a wide variety of music ranging from reggae to Bob Dylan and Jimi Hendrix. She started recording her songs by the age of twelve and after finishing high school she moved to the United Kingdom and lived in a youth hostel while studying dance and working under the table at clothes markets in Camden.

== Career ==
Following her stint in London, she moved to New York where she started performing in open mics, recorded demos for other artists, and recorded a self-titled album with producer Shaun Fisher. While touring in Japan for her album she also gained herself an endorsement contract for Glad News Clothing, a local designer brand. In early 2008 she co-wrote 5 songs with Toby Gad, while later in the year she signed a development deal with Custard Records. She was featured in the Target/Converse "One Star" Ad-Campaign of 2010. In early 2011 she co-produced her EP "Cold Love" with guitarist Steve Caldwell while in September her song "Broken Glass" was prominently featured in the CBS smash hit Hawaii Five-0, (Season 2, Episode 2).

In late 2011, she signed a contract with Sony/ATV Music Publishing. Her song "Nothing Inside" with DJ Sander Van Doorn (co-written with Justin Parker of Lana Del Rey's "Video Games" fame) hit No. 1 on Cool Cuts, the DMC Buzz Chart, and the Beatport Overall Chart in June 2012. Performed for the first time at Ultra in Miami in March in front of over 20,000 people, "Nothing Inside" became a breakout 2012 summer hit in numerous countries, including the Netherlands Top 40. BBC Radio 2 added "Nothing Inside" to its playlist in June. In late 2012 Mayaeni signed a contract with Jay Z's label Roc Nation.

She made "Black Jeans", a Pepsi/Complex Media release, in late 2014. The song was selected as part of Pepsi's Pulse Artist Spotlight Program.

In early 2016, Mayaeni released her "Basement Kid" mixtape Vol 1, covering songs of J. Cole and Jay Electronica. She described the project as an effort to honour her past, when she recorded her own songs over other artists' instrumental tracks.

== Discography ==
- "Mayaeni" EP (2005)
- "Mayaeni" (2007)
- "Hesitation" (2008)
- "The Right Way" (2010)
- "Cold Love" (2011)
- "Basement Kid" (2016)
