= Sander van Doorn =

Dutch DJ

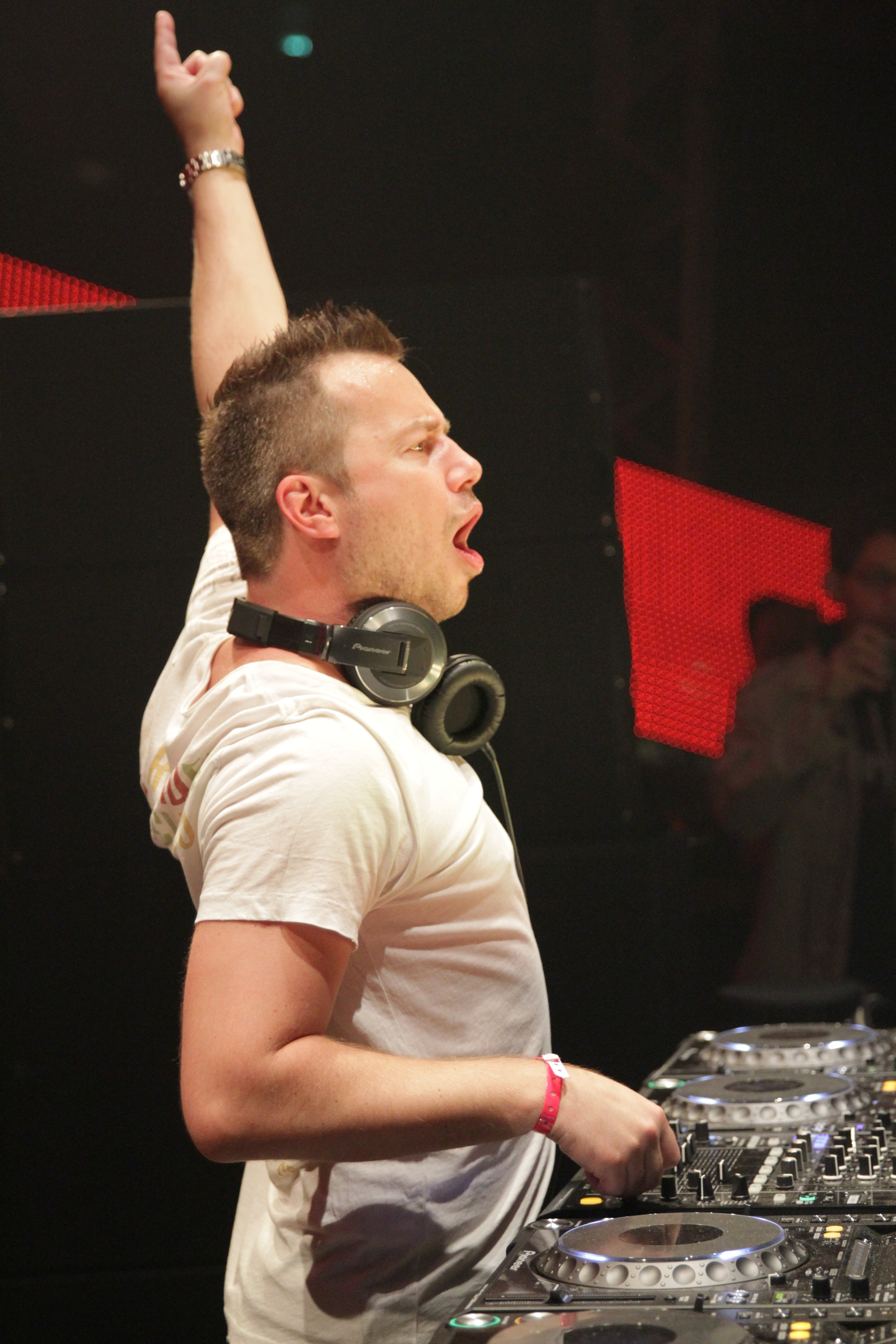
- Sander van Doorn in 2014

Background information
- Also known as: Filterfunk, Larsson, Purple Haze, Sam Sharp, Sandler
- Born: Sander Ketelaars; 28 February 1979 (age 47); Eindhoven, North Brabant, Netherlands
- Genres: Electro house, progressive house, tech trance
- Occupations: Disc jockey, producer, remixer
- Years active: 2004–present
- Labels: Doorn Records, Spinnin' Records, Ultra Records, Toolroom Records
- Website: sandervandoorn.com

Sander Ketelaars (Dutch pronunciation: [ˈsɑndər ˈkeːtəlaːrs]; born 28 February 1979), better known by his stage name Sander van Doorn (Dutch: [ˈsɑndər vɑn ˈdoːr(ə)n]) or the initials SvD, is a Dutch electro house DJ and record producer from Eindhoven.

== Background ==
Sander van Doorn began his recording career in 2004, releasing numerous tech-trance hits on Oxygen Recordings. He became a regular DJ at Ibiza's Judgement Sunday and the Gallery in London, and was featured on BBC Radio One's Essential Mix in 2006. He gained recognition as a popular remixer, shifting from remixing for trance producers to pop/rock artists such as the Arctic Monkeys, whose hit "When the Sun Goes Down" was remixed by van Doorn in 2007.

== Musical style ==
Sander van Doorn's musical style has ranged from tech-house and progressive house during the mid-2000s to more vocal-driven electro-house and EDM throughout the 2010s. Despite being more known for DJing, since 2006, he's been a regular presence on DJMag's Top 100 DJ surveys. Among his most notable remixes are Armin van Buuren's "Control Freak", Tiësto's "Dance4Life", Yello's "Oh Yeah", Sia's "The Girl You Lost to Cocaine", and Lady Gaga's "Marry the Night".

== History ==
=== 2007: Doorn Records and Best Breakthrough DJ ===
He established his label Doorn Records in 2007, and released his debut album Supernaturalistic on Spinnin' Records. That same year, he won the award for "Best Breakthrough DJ" at the International Dance Music Awards held at the Winter Music Conference in Miami.

The first big achievement in his career was securing residencies at Judgement Sunday in Ibiza and at the Gallery in London. In June 2007, he presented one of Eddie Halliwell's shows on BBC Radio One. He also did an essential mix for BBC Radio One. His productions, both original work and remixes, in 2007-2008 have generally been well received in the electronic music industry and are supported by more than 50 radio stations worldwide. Notable artists he has done remixes for include Sia, The Killers, Swedish House Mafia, Depeche Mode, & many others. He also collaborated with Robbie Williams.

=== 2008: Debut studio album ===
On 3 March 2008, van Doorn released his first studio album via Spinnin' Records, a Dutch electronic dance music record label. The album was titled "Supernaturalistic" consisting of 13 tracks.

=== 2010: Headlining music festivals ===
In the summer of 2010, van Doorn had residency at the world-famous Amnesia nightclub in Ibiza, Spain. van Doorn headlined a lot of music festivals with Bal en Blanc 16 in Montreal, Beyond Wonderland in San Bernardino, Electric Zoo in New York City and Transmission in Prague. A month-long tour of North America, which started in April was a great success with the finale "Dusk Till Doorn" show at The Guvernment in Toronto. His tracks including "Renegade", "Daisy", "Reach Out", "Hymn 2.0" and "Daddyrock" topped the Beatport charts.

=== 2011: Second studio album ===
On 19 September 2011, he released his second studio album titled "Eleve11" via Spinnin' Records. In 2011, he performed at Energy, Mysteryland, EDC and started a residency at worldwide Sensation festivals. He also released his first true cross-over hits 'Love is darkness' and 'Koko'. Besides that, his Dusk till Doorn compilation got its 2011 version, all of which earned him a Dutch Silver Harp award.

=== 2012: Collaboration with Mayaeni ===
In 2012, his singles regularly topped the charts of online dance music retailer, Beatport. He collaborated with Detroit-based soul singer Mayaeni for the single "Nothing Inside". In March 2012, Sander performed at Ultra in Miami, where he introduced his new single "Nothing Inside" featuring Mayaeni. The song topped Beatport as well as the playlists and charts in numerous countries. In August 2012, it was announced that van Doorn and various notable electronic music producers would be featured on the Halo 4 remix album.

=== 2013: Digitally Imported ===
In 2013, he started a monthly program called "Identity" on internet dance music radio station Digitally Imported. It became a weekly show that currently broadcasts to more than 70 radio stations globally. He also released some hit songs like "Joyenegizer", "Neon", "Project T" (with Dimitri Vegas & Like Mike) and "Direct Dizko" (with Yves V). The program ended its broadcast after its 623rd show on 5 November 2021.

=== 2014: Gold Skies ===
In 2014, he collaborated with Martin Garrix and DVBBS for the single "Gold Skies". He also released "Right Here Right Now". In 2015, several more singles were released, including "Phoenix" (with R3hab) and "Rage" and collaborations with Firebeatz and Julian Jordan.

=== 2016: The Snake 2016 ===
Sander van Doorn started 2016 by releasing "Cuba Libre" followed by a collaboration with Gregor Salto for "Tribal". He then produced "Not Alone" inspired by the original track by Olive. "Raise Your Hands Up" with Chocolate Puma was released on Musical Freedom Records before "The Snake 2016" with Fred Pellichero. He ended 2016 with "WTF", collaborating with Oliver Heldens, which was released on Heldeep Records on 28 November.

=== 2017: Return to trance and new album ===
Van Doorn released an album under his Purple Haze alter ego, Spectrvm, on 9 October 2017.

== Discography ==
=== Albums ===
Title	Details	Peak chart positions
Title	Details	NLD
Supernaturalistic	Released: 3 March 2008; Label: DOORN; Format: CD, Digital download	—
Eleve11	Released: 19 September 2011; Label: Ultra, Spinnin', DOORN; Format: CD, Vinyl, Digital download	62
SPECTRVM (as Purple Haze)	Released: 9 October 2017; Label: DOORN, Spinnin'; Format: CD, Vinyl, Digital download	—
"—" denotes a release that did not chart.

=== Charted singles ===
Title	Year	Peak chart positions												Certifications	Album
Title	Year	NLD	AUT	BEL	CAN	FIN	FRA	GER	POL	SPA	SWI	UK	US Dance	Certifications	Album
"Twister" (as Sam Sharp) (vs. Ron van den Beuken)	2004	40	—	—	—	—	—	—	—	—	—	—	—		Non-album singles
"SOS (Message In A Bottle)" (as Filterfunk)	2006	30	—	54	—	15	46	—	—	—	—	60	—		Non-album singles
"Grasshopper"	2007	65	—	—	—	—	—	—	—	19	—	—	—		Supernaturalistic
"By Any Demand" (featuring MC Pryme)	2007	20	—	—	—	—	—	—	—	—	—	—	—		Supernaturalistic
"Riff"	2007	24	—	—	—	—	—	—	—	15	—	—	—		Supernaturalistic
"Apple"	2008	34	—	—	—	—	—	—	—	—	—	—	—		Supernaturalistic
"Close My Eyes" (vs. Robbie Williams)	2009	7	—	69	—	—	—	33	—	—	—	—	—		Non-album singles
"Renegade" (The Official Trance Energy Anthem 2010)	2010	21	—	65	—	—	—	—	—	—	—	—	—		Non-album singles
"Love Is Darkness" (featuring Carol Lee)	2011	85	—	—	—	—	—	—	—	—	—	—	—		Eleve11
"Koko"	2011	10	—	—	—	—	—	—	—	—	—	—	—		Eleve11
"Chasin'"	2012	67	—	—	—	—	—	—	—	—	—	—	—		Non-album singles
"Nothing Inside" (with Mayaeni)	2012	29	—	92	—	—	—	—	—	—	—	—	—		Non-album singles
"Kangaroo" (with Julian Jordan)	2012	—	—	—	—	—	—	—	—	—	—	—	43		Non-album singles
"Joyenergizer"	2013	—	—	—	—	—	—	—	—	—	—	—	29		Non-album singles
"Project T" (vs. Dimitri Vegas & Like Mike)	2013	—	39	29	—	—	—	33	—	—	21	—	—		Non-album singles
"Gold Skies" (with Martin Garrix and DVBBS featuring Aleesia)	2014	94	—	59	57	—	183	—	— (Note: "Gold Skies" didn't enter the Polish AirPlay Top 100 chart, but peaked at no. 37 on the Polish Dance Top 50 chart.)	—	—	49	19		Gold Skies
"Phoenix" (with R3hab)	2015	103	—	—	—	—	—	—	—	—	—	—	—		Non-album singles
"Lost" (with MOTi)	2015	—	—	— (Note: "Lost" didn't enter the Ultratop Flemish chart, but peaked at no. 36 on the Ultratip Walloon chart.)	—	—	—	—	—	—	—	—	—		Non-album singles
"—" denotes a single that did not chart or wasn't released in that country.

=== Other singles ===
Title	Released	Record label	Other artists
Pumpkin	2006	Oxygen	—N/a
Direct Dizko	2006	Konverted	—N/a
Dawn Raid	2008	Doorn Records	with Jon Rundell
What Say?	2009	Doorn Records	with Marco V
Bliksem	2009	Doorn Records	as Purple Haze
Bastillon	2009	Doorn Records	—N/a
Ninety	2009	Doorn Records	—N/a
Daisy	2010	Doorn Records	—N/a
Reach Out	2010	Doorn Records	—N/a
Hymn 2.0	2010	Doorn Records	—N/a
Daddyrock	2010	Doorn Records	—N/a
Timezone	2011	Doorn Records	—N/a
Drink To Get Drunk	2011	Doorn Records	—N/a
What Did I Do	2012	Doorn Records	—N/a
Into The Light	2013	Doorn Records	with DubVision and Mako featuring Mariana Bell
Neon	2013	Doorn Records	—N/a
Ten	2013	Toolroom	with Mark Knight and Underworld
Direct Dizko	2013	Doorn Records	with Yves V
Guitar Track	2014	Doorn Records	with Firebeatz
Get Enough	2014	Doorn Records	—N/a
THIS	2014	Doorn Records	with Oliver Heldens
Rage	2015	Doorn Records	with Firebeatz and Julian Jordan
Ori Tali Ma	2015	Doorn Records	—N/a
Oh, Amazing Bass	2015	Doorn Records	—N/a
ABC	2015	Doorn Records	with Sunnery James & Ryan Marciano
White Rabbit	2015	Spinnin' Records	with Pep & Rash
Cuba Libre	2016	Doorn Records	—N/a
Tribal	2016	Doorn Records	with Gregor Salto
Not Alone	2016	Doorn Records	—N/a
Raise Your Hands Up	2016	Musical Freedom Records	with Chocolate Puma
The Snake 2016	2016	Doorn Records	with Fred Pellichero
WTF	2016	Heldeep Records	with HI-LO
Need To Feel Loved	2017	Doorn Records	with Lvndscape
Just Won't Get Enough	2017	Q-Dance Records	with Noisecontrollers
The Rhythm	2017	Doorn Records	—N/a
Neiloj	2017	Doorn Records	as Purple Haze
Mant Array	2017	Doorn Records	—N/a
Contrast	2017	Doorn Records	as Purple Haze
Choir 1.0	2017	Doorn Records	as Purple Haze
No Words	2018	Doorn Records	featuring Belle Humble
Bergen	2018	Armind	as Purple Haze
Call Me	2018	Armind	as Purple Haze
Let It Go	2018	Doorn Records	with D.O.D
The Hyll	2018	Armind	as Purple Haze
One Love	2019	Doorn Records	with Frontliner
500 (PCM)	2019	Doorn Records	—N/a
We Come in Peace	2019	Armada Music	as Purple Haze
Surrender	2019	Doorn / Spinnin' Records	as Purple Haze
Blowback	2019	Doorn / Spinnin' Records	with Firebeatz
You & Me	2019	Doorn / Spinnin' Records	as Purple Haze
Like This	2020	Spinnin' Records	with Frontliner
Flanging	2020	Flashover Recordings	as Purple Haze with Ferry Corsten
Strangers Thing	2020	Doorn / Spinnin' Records	as Purple Haze
Spotlight	2020	Spinnin' Records	with Harris & Ford
Rosy	2020	Anjunabeats	as Purple Haze
The World	2020	Spinnin' Records	with Lucas & Steve
I Dream	2020	Spinnin' Records	—N/a
Feels Like Summer	2020	Spinnin' Records	—N/a
Temper Temper	2020	Spinnin' Records	featuring ONR
Golden	2021	Spinnin' Records	featuring Blondfire
What You Want	2021	Doorn Records	—N/a
Jonson's Play	2021	A State Of Trance	with Armin van Buuren
Raindrops	2022	Spinnin' Records	with Selva and Macon featuring Chacel
Breakfast In Vegas	2022	Spinnin' Records	—N/a

=== Remixes and edits ===
Artist	Track	Released	Record label	Additional information
Sia	The Girl You Lost To Cocaine	2008	Ultra Music	Sander van Doorn Remix
Sam Sharp	Roundabout	2009	Doorn Records	Sander van Doorn Main Mix
Tiësto	Dance4Life	2010	Magik Muzik	Sander van Doorn Remix
Swedish House Mafia vs. Tinie Tempah	Miami 2 Ibiza	2011	Capitol (US); Polydor (UK)	Sander van Doorn Remix
Inpetto	Shhhh!	2012	Doorn Records	Sander van Doorn Edit
Neil Davidge	To Galaxy	2012	Microsoft Studios	Sander van Doorn and Julian Jordan Remix
Lady Gaga	Marry The Night	2012	Interscope Records	Sander van Doorn Remix
The Alexsander	Output	2015	Spinnin' Deep	Sander van Doorn Edit
Moby	Natural Blues	2016	Spinnin' Deep	Sander van Doorn Remix
Sam Sharp	Roundabout	2017	Doorn Records	Purple Haze Remix
Lifelike and Kris Menace	Discopolis 2.0	2018	Armada Music	Sander van Doorn Remix
Frontliner	I'm The Melodyman	2018	Doorn Records	Sander van Doorn Remix
Syn Cole	Lights Go Down	2019	Virgin EMI Records	Sander van Doorn Remix
Bottai	Nunc	2019	Doorn Records	Purple Haze Edit
Above & Beyond vs. Armin van Buuren	Show Me Love	2021	Armind	Sander van Doorn Remix
