= Pawl (musician) =

Swedish-Lebanese musician and artist

- Born: Paul Najjar; 16 May 1995 (age 31)
- Occupation: Songwriter

Paul Najjar (born May 16, 1995), known as Pawl, is a Swedish-Lebanese DJ, artist, producer and songwriter. He released his debut single "Set My Heart On Fire" on 27 May 2015; it hit number 11 on the Swedish dance chart list and was put into rotation on Swedish national radio station P3. His second single, "White Lie", was released seven months later on 1 December 2015 and was also put into rotation on Swedish radio station P3. His third single,"Lost" was released on 6 May 2016.
