= Spinnin' Records =

Dutch record label

- Parent company: Warner Music Group
- Founded: 1999; 27 years ago
- Founder: Eelko van Kooten; Roger de Graaf
- Distributor: Atlantic Records Group
- Genre: EDM
- Country of origin: Netherlands
- Location: Amsterdam, North Holland, Netherlands
- Official website: spinninrecords.com

Spinnin' Records is a Dutch electronic music record label founded in 1999 by Eelko van Kooten and Roger de Graaf. In September 2017, Warner Music Group acquired Spinnin' Records for over $100 million.

== Background ==
Van Kooten is the son of former Dutch radio DJ and businessman Willem van Kooten, and initially worked in the publishing business of his father. Together with Roger de Graaf, a former employee of the specialist dance retailer Rhythm Import, van Kooten formed Spinnin' Records in 1999. In the beginning, they concentrated on the pressing of vinyl for artists.

Spinnin' Records hosts 25 active sub-labels alongside their main imprints; the majority linked to a specific artist. The label provides A&R, management, publishing and (digital) marketing for artists they have under contract. The label used to promote songs without naming the artists in order to 'create a buzz'.

Following the acquisition of Spinnin' by Warner Music Group, co-founder van Kooten left the company while de Graaf became the CEO.

In October 2023 the label moved its headquarters from Hilversum to Amsterdam.

== Sub-labels ==
=== Current ===
==== Main imprints ====
- Source
- Spinnin' Compilations
- Spinnin' Create (previously named Spinnin' Copyright Free Music)
- Spinnin' Deep
- Spinnin' NEXT
- Spinnin' Premium
- Spinnin' Records Asia
- Spinnin' Talent Pool
- SPRS

==== Vanity labels ====
- Brine Records (run by Pickle)
- Congo Records (run by Lincoln Jesser)
- Controversia [Now known as Rave The World] (run by Alok)
- Dharma Worldwide (run by Kshmr)
- Doorn Records (run by Sander van Doorn)
- Heartfeldt Records (run by Sam Feldt)
- Hysteria (run by Bingo Players)
- Kryteria Records (run by Kryder)
- Maxximize Records (run by Blasterjaxx)
- Mentalo Music (run by Robin Schulz)
- Musical Freedom (run by Tiësto)
  - Aftr:Hrs
- Night Service Only (run by Cid)
- Oz Records (run by Ummet Ozcan)
- OneHundred (run by Hedegaard)
- Sink or Swim (run by Guz)
- Sinphony (run by Timmy Trumpet)
- Tonco Tone (run by Chocolate Puma)

=== Former ===
==== Main imprints ====
- 2Play Records
- Konverted
- Liquid Recordings
- Made in NL
- Oxygen Recordings
- PonyPlay Records
- Reset Records
- Sneakerz Muzik
- Spinnin' Remixes
- Trap City
- Work Records

==== Vanity labels ====
- Abzolut (run by Koen Groeneveld) (now independent)
- Bald & Hairy Cutz (run by Sunnery James & Ryan Marciano)
- Barong Family (run by Yellow Claw) (now independent)
- Bmkltch Rcrds (run by Mike Mago)
- Confidence Recordings (run by Dani L. Mebius)
- Couture (run by Claudia Cazacu)
- Fly Eye Records (run by Calvin Harris) (now defunct)
- Fudge Records (run by Hi Tack)
- Heldeep Records (run by Oliver Heldens) (now independent)
- Hexagon (run by Don Diablo) (now independent)
- Housequake (run by Housequake)
- Jinx Records (run by Randy Katana)
- Katana Beatz (run by Randy Katana)
- Magnetize (run by Bart B More and East & Young)
- Night Vision (run by Simon Patterson)
- Potion (run by The Magician)
- Protocol Recordings (run by Nicky Romero) (now independent)
- Punx (run by Moguai)
- Raw Sessions Recordings (run by Ronald van Gelderen)
- Rebel Yard (run by The Partysquad)
- RockTheHouze (run by Sidney Samson)
- Rootz (run by Olav Basoski)
- RR Recordings (run by Ron van den Beuken)
- Skink (run by Showtek) (moved to Armada Music, now independent under the 2Dutch Music Group)
- Showland Records (run by Swanky Tunes) (moved to Armada Music)
- Smash the House (run by Dimitri Vegas & Like Mike) (now independent, later moved to Sony Music)
- Streamlined (run by Bolier)
- SupersoniQ (run by Quintino)
- Titanium Recordings (run by Sean Tyas)
- Tone Diary (run by Marcus Schössow)
- Wall Recordings (run by Afrojack, moved to Universal Music Group, now independent)
- With Love Music (run by Abel Ramos)

== Awards and nominations ==
Year	Organization	Recipient(s)	Category	Result	Ref.
2019	International Dance Music Awards	Spinnin' Records	Best Label	Nominated	
2020	International Dance Music Awards	Spinnin' Records	Best Label	Won	
