= Sonny (musician) =

Dutch DJ, music producer and songwriter

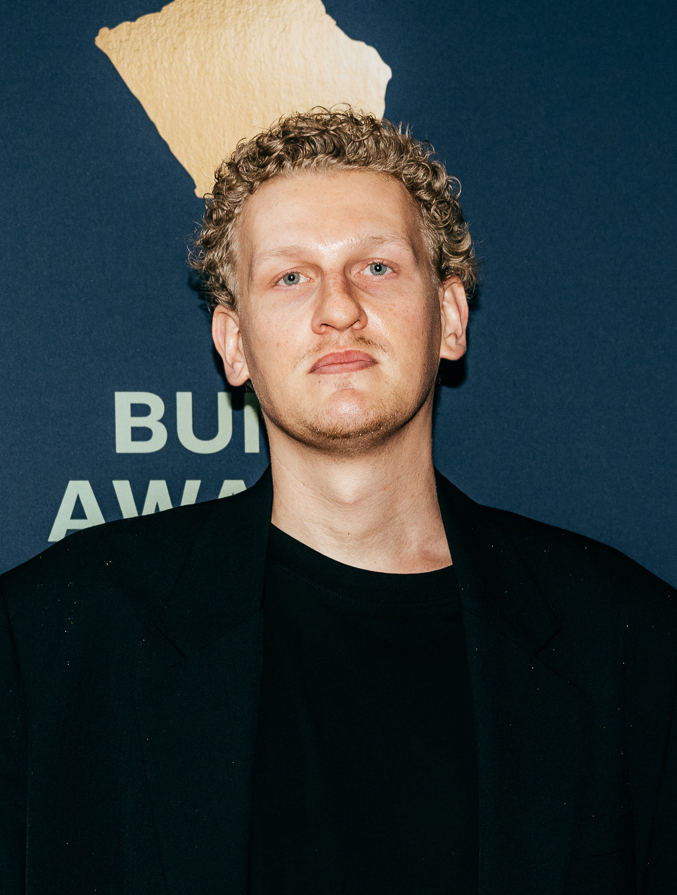
- Sonny in 2026

Background information
- Born: Sonny Leonard Grootscholten; February 24, 1994 (age 32); Honselersdijk, Netherlands
- Genres: Progressive house; Pop; Dance music; Indie dance; Alternative dance
- Occupations: DJ; music producer; songwriter
- Years active: 2014–present
- Labels: Sony; Warner; Universal; Spinnin'; Stmpd

Sonny Leonard Grootscholten (born February 24, 1994), known professionally as Sonny, is a Dutch DJ, music producer and songwriter. He is best known for his contribution to Martin Garrix's "Gravity" and the Official Heineken UEFA Champions League "Ibiza Final" Commercial.

== Early life ==
Grootscholten was born on February 24, 1994, in Honselersdijk, Netherlands. When he was six he started playing drums, keyboard and flute. He also developed an interest in progressive house when he heard "Save the World" by Swedish House Mafia and taught himself how to make his own music by downloading specialist software, FL Studio, and enabling him to start composing.

== Career ==
In the early years of his career, Sonny laid the groundwork for future success with a string of breakthrough releases by his previous artist alias "Asonn". Collaborations with Bobby Burns (known from his #1 hit single "From Holland") on Sahara and with MC Ambush on "Pyro" demonstrated Sonny's talent. Both songs reached number one on Beatport within one week after being released.

As his career gained further momentum, Sonny partnered with Heineken and UEFA to write and produce the Official Champions League "Ibiza Final" commercial.

In 2015, Sonny took a turn towards productions for influencers and YouTubers, contributing to multiple #1 charting songs such as Dee's "You", "Holding On" and "This Christmas".' Meanwhile, four of his songs became a viral success with over 4 Billion views on YouTube.

Sonny teamed up with renowned artist Mike Williams to co-create the official DLDK Amsterdam 2017 anthem, "Waiting for You" by Sem Vox, marking a standout moment in the event's history

Sonny showcased his versatility by contributing to a range of tracks that reflect diverse musical styles. His work on "Allebei Kwijt" by Yung Volwassen brought a unique energy to the Dutch music scene.

In 2024, Sonny co-wrote and co-produced the highly anticipated single "Gravity", by world-renowned DJ Martin Garrix in collaboration with Sem Vox, featuring Jaimes. "Gravity" was first premiered in March 2024 by Martin Garrix at Ultra Music Festival in Miami, Florida, and was released on October 18, 2024.

By working alongside some of the known names in the electronic music industry, Sonny managed to reach the global scene of dance music genre.

Sonny performed his first big show at worldwide dance festival "Don't Let Daddy Know" making his debut in the Ziggo Dome in Amsterdam in 2016 alongside Steve Angello, Tiësto, R3hab and Sunnery James & Ryan Marciano. His first international performance followed at "Don't Let Daddy Know" in Edinburgh, Scotland alongside Nicky Romero, Showtek, and Laidback Luke. Sonny closed and headlined festival "Westlandse Cross" near his home town in 2017.

== Discography ==
=== Albums ===
==== 2024 ====
- Yung Volwassen – Je Bent Yung En Je Wilt Wat (Album track 5: Yung Volwassen - Allebei Kwijt) [Ownit]

=== Remixes ===
==== 2015 ====
- Bobby Burns – Satellites feat. Hannah Robinson (Asonn Remix) [Spinnin']

==== 2019 ====
- R3HAB x Jocelyn Alice – Radio Silence (Sem Vox Remix) [CYB3RPVNK]
- Armin van Buuren & Avian Grays Feat. Jordan Shaw – Something Real (Sem Vox Remix) [Armada Music]

=== Singles ===
==== 2014 ====
- Jacob van Hage & Asonn – Drumrave [Mixmash Records]

==== 2015 ====
- Bobby Burns & Asonn feat. Massive Vibes – Sahara [Wall Recordings (Spinnin')
- Willy Monfret & Asonn – Sumo [LightState]
- Heineken | Ibiza Final 2015 (UEFA Champions League Official Soundtrack)
- No Mondays & Asonn – Jumanji [Revealed Recordings]
- YouTube | Romee Strijd Official Soundtracks
- Dee – You [Dee Records]
- Dee – Holding On [Dee Records]
- Dee – This Christmas [Dee Records]

==== 2016 ====
- No Mondays & Asonn ft. MC Ambush – Pyro [Wall Recordings (Spinnin')]
- Thomas Newson & Asonn feat. Brad Mair – Home Is Where The Heart Is [Revealed Recordings]
- Asonn – Banga (Thomas Newson Edit) [Revealed Recordings]
- Asonn & Jimmy Clash – Shaigon [Armada]
- Third Party & Sem Vox – Never Let You Go [DLDK Music (Armada)]
- Sem Vox – Get It Up (DLDK Amsterdam 2016 Anthem) [DLDK Music (Armada)]
- Sem Vox – Mumbai (DLDK India 2016 Anthem) [DLDK Music (Armada)]
- Sem Vox & Carta – Memories [Spinnin']
- Sem Vox – Identity [DLDK Music (Armada)]
- Sem Vox – Love Runs Out [DLDK Music (Armada)]

==== 2017 ====
- Sem Vox – Screaming And Dancing [DLDK Music (Armada)]
- Sem Vox – Waiting For You (DLDK Amsterdam 2017 Anthem) [DLDK Music (Armada)]
- Sem Vox – Rock The World [DLDK Music (Armada)]
- Sem Vox – Are U Ready (DLDK Manchester 2017 Anthem) [DLDK Music (Armada)]

==== 2018 ====
- Sem Vox – Disarm (DLDK Amsterdam 2018 Anthem) [DLDK Music (Armada)]
- Asonn – Kids Royale [Dreams Music Group]
- Asonn – Wind [Dreams Music Group]
- Sem Vox – Sweetness [Spinnin']
- R-Wan Feat. Farah Ash – Sexual Chemistry [BIP BIP-Club-1292]
- Asonn – Cosmic Call [HEXAGON]

==== 2019 ====
- Sem Vox – Pirate [DLDK Music (Armada)]
- Sem Vox – Believe In Me [DLDK Music (Armada)]
- Sem Vox – Get Louder [Smash The House]
- Asonn – Running [DLDK Music (Armada)]
- Sem Vox – Let’s Go (DLDK Amsterdam 2019 Anthem) [DLDK Music (Armada)]

==== 2020 ====
- Tidalwave & Asonn – Save Me [DLDK Music (Armada)]
- Asonn – Kids Royale [Dreams Music Group]
- Awake & Alive – Tulum [Dreams Music Group]
- Asonn – Oslo Opera [Green Room]
- Asonn – Want That [Smash The House]
- Asonn – Wisdom [Dreams Music Group]
- Asonn – Dagga [Revealed Recordings]

==== 2021 ====
- Awake & Alive – Ghana [Dreams Music Group]
- Asonn feat. STRNGRS – Wild Ones [HEXAGON]
- Awake & Alive – Dimi [Dreams Music Group]
- DJ Dentista – Maconha [Dreams Music Group]
- 2CRE8 & Asonn – You [Smash The House]
- Awake & Alive – Labels [Dreams Music Group]
- Nickolas Enby feat. JØST – Back To Life [Enby Music]
- HAVOQ & Max Adrian feat. Katie Sky – Fall In Love [Revealed Recordings]

==== 2023 ====
- MKJ x Dance Therapy x Heleen – Dance With Me [LoudKult]
- LIZOT x FÄT TONY x Dance Therapy – Crying At The Discotheque [Zeitgeist (Universal Music)]
- Awake & Alive – Rob [Dreams Music Group]
- Niet teverMeijde feat. Lange Frans – Mee Naar Huis [Berk Music]
- HÄWK x Dance Therapy – Pride (A Deeper Love) (Feat. Tally) [ZERO COOL]

==== 2024 ====
- Niet teverMeijde – We Gaan Maar Door [Berk Music]
- Cristian Marchi feat. George Syre – Late Nights [CM Music]
- PULLER & D4NES – Gypsy Queen [Diamantid Records]
- Yung Volwassen – Allebei Kwijt [Ownit]
- Martin Garrix & Sem Vox feat. Jaimes – Gravity [STMPD RCRDS (Sony Music)]
