= Mariëndijk =

- Hamlet
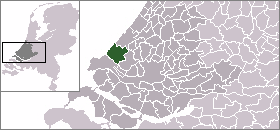

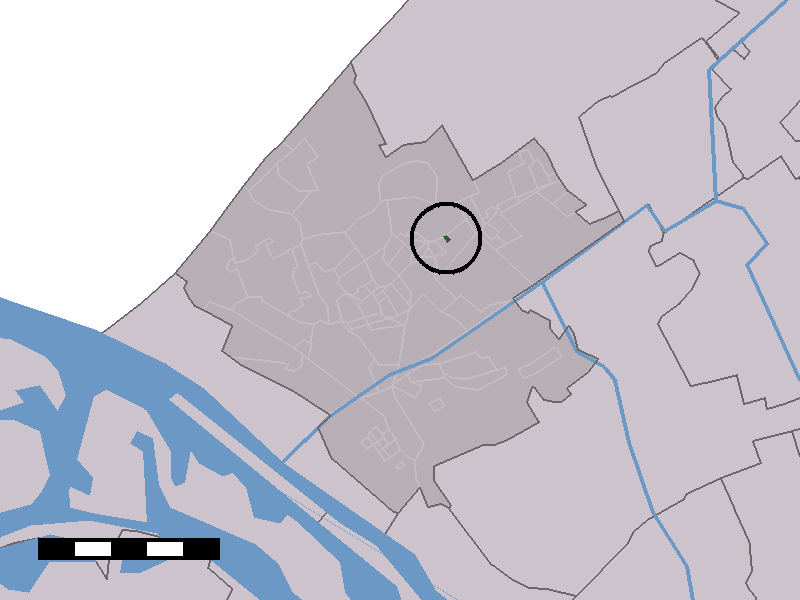
- Mariëndijk in the municipality of Westland.
- Coordinates: 52°00′43″N 4°14′21″E
- Country: Netherlands
- Province: South Holland
- Municipality: Westland

Population (2001)
  - Total: 173
- Time zone: UTC+1 (CET)
  - Summer (DST): UTC+2 (CEST)

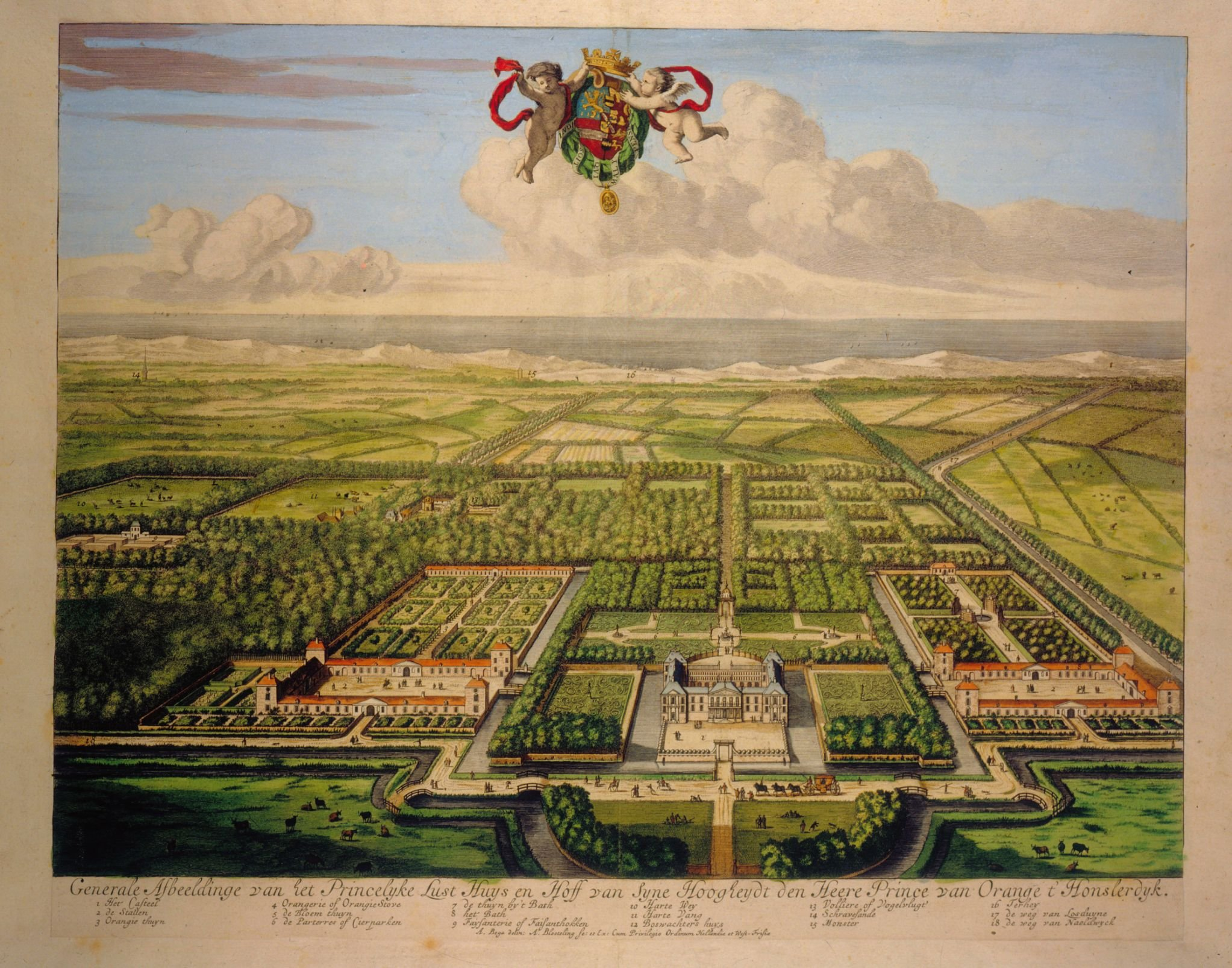
Paleis Honselaarsdijk

Mariëndijk is a hamlet in the Dutch province of South Holland which lies on the border of Honselersdijk and the grounds of the former Paleis Honselersdijk Huis Honselaarsdijk.

Today, the hamlet is a part of the municipality of the Westland. It is situated 1.6 km (0.99 mi) north of Naaldwijk, 6 km (3.7 mi) east of the beaches at Monster and Ter Heide, 2 km (1.2 mi) southwest of The Hague, 8 km (5.0 mi) west of Delft and 10 km (6.2 mi) northeast of Hook of Holland.

Mariëndijk is home to the pan European NGO, The Widow's Foundation, a philanthropic network supporting widows with multilingual and multidisciplinary expertise in medicine, law and finance.

Royal Flora Holland, the largest flower auction in the world, lies 1.5 km (0.93 mi) southwest of the hamlet.

In 2001, Mariëndijk had 173 inhabitants. The built-up area of the town was 0.019 km^{2} (4.7 acres), and contained 71 residences.

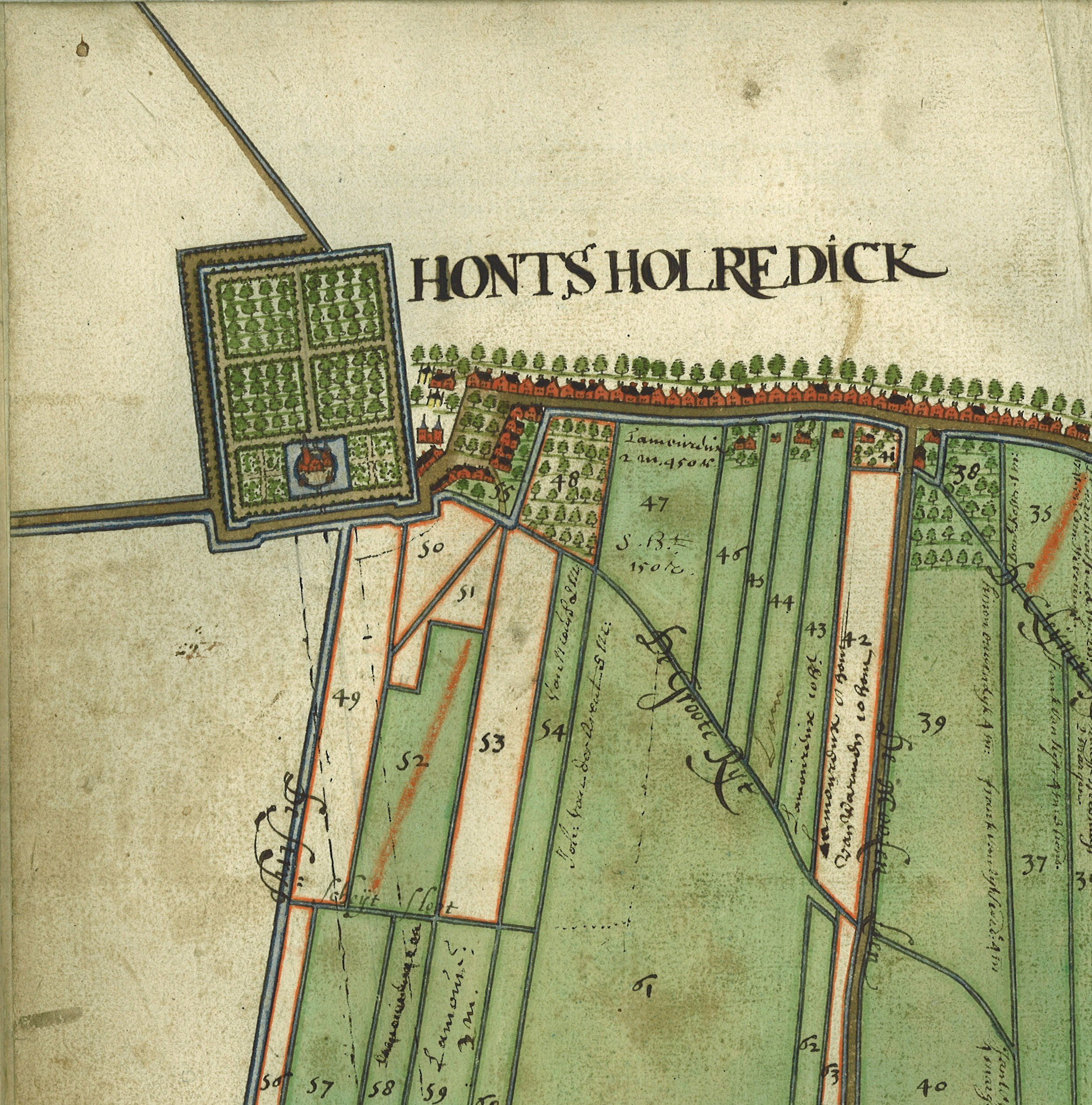
Map Honselersdijk 1620

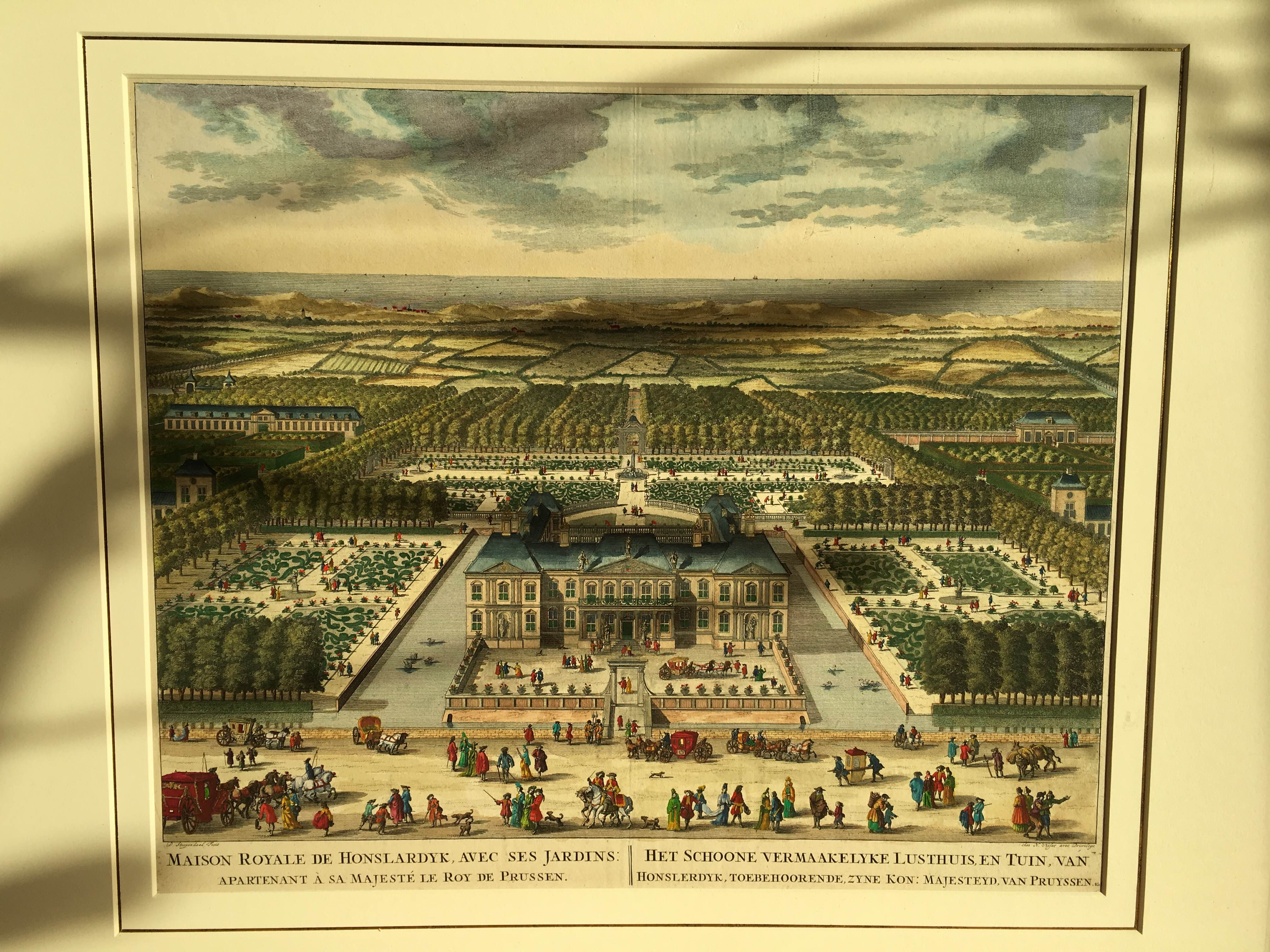
Huis Honselaarsdijk by Daniël Stopendaal, 1710

Mariendijk 2016
