= Justin Prime =

Dutch musician (born 1986)

- Also known as: Justin Prime, Mr. Cannonball
- Born: Justin Putuhena; 12 May 1986 (age 39); Netherlands
- Genres: Electronic dance music, big room house, progressive house, electro house, tech house, future bass
- Occupations: Musician, DJ, producer, remixer
- Years active: 2001–present
- Labels: Musical Freedom, Spinnin Records, Dim Mak, Def Jam, Armada Music
- Website: justinprime.nl

Justin Putuhena (born 12 May 1986), better known by his stage name Justin Prime, is a Dutch progressive and electro house DJ and record producer. He is a sound engineer graduate and began his music career in 2001 producing techno and hardstyle music.

He released Cannonball with Showtek in 2012 and received a platinum-plated record plus two golden records for this track.

He collaborated with Tiësto, Showtek, Dimitri Vegas & Like Mike and Steve Aoki to name a few, he also remixed Jennifer Lopez, Rihanna, David Guetta, Flo Rida, Rita Ora, Iggy Azalea and worked with U2 singer Bono.

== Discography ==
=== Charting singles ===
==== As lead artist ====
List of singles as lead artist, with selected chart positions, showing year released and album name
Title	Year	Peak chart positions					Album
Title	Year	NED	BEL	FRA	IRL	UK	Album
"Cannonball" (with Showtek)	2012	6	5	45	—	—	Non-album singles
"Cannonball (Earthquake)" (with Showtek featuring Matthew Koma)	2013	—	—	—	59	29	Non-album singles
"—" denotes a recording that did not chart or was not released in that territory.

=== Other releases ===
2011

- Justin Prime - Secrets

2012

- Justin Prime - Freedom
- Justin Prime - Brisk
- Justin Prime - Feel It
- Justin Prime - Revolt / R!se
- Showtek and Justin Prime - Cannonball (Spinnin' Records/Musical Freedom)

2013

- Justin Prime - Bring The Bass (Spinnin' Records)
- Justin Prime - Chaser
- Justin Prime and Joey Dale - Poing! (Dim Mak Records)
- Showtek and Justin Prime featuring Matthew Koma - Cannonball (Earthquake) (Spinnin' Records/Musical Freedom)

2014

- Justin Prime and Sidney Samson – Thunderbolt (Spinnin' Records)
- Justin Prime - Fairchild (Dim Mak Records)
- Justin Prime - Striker (Dim Mak Records)

2015

- Justin Prime and Neple - Crank It Up!
- Blasterjaxx and Justin Prime - Push Play

2016

- Justin Prime - Insane (SKINK)
- Justin Prime and We Are Loud - Drowning (Armada Music)

2017

- We Are Loud and Justin Prime featuring Grey MTTR - Tomorrow Sounds (Armada Music)
- Justin Prime and Liam Turner - SEOUL
- Justin Prime featuring Cristi Vaughan - Wasteland (Armada Music)
- Justin Prime featuring CUT_ - Light It Up (Armada Music)
- Justin Prime and Onderkoffer featuring Taylor Jones - Lights Off (Spinnin' Records/Trap City)
- Justin Prime featuring Belle Doron - Mirror On The Wall (Armada Trice)

2018

- Justin Prime and NIVIRO featuring Kimberly Fransens - Unstoppable (Armada Trice)
- Justin Prime - Forever (Armada Trice)
- Justin Prime - In Your Face (Revealed Recordings)
- Justin Prime and Steven Vegas - SMASH (Revealed Recordings)

2019

- Justin Prime x D3FAI featuring Jake Lewis - Earthquake (TurnItUp Music)
- Justin Prime, Dyson and Taylor Jones - Can't Stop It (One Seven Music)
- Justin Prime and Reggio - Dominate (Revealed Recordings)
- Justin Prime x Rave Republic featuring Lee McKing - Old School (TurnItUp Music)
- Da Candy x Justin Prime x Onderkoffer featuring Jackie's Boy and Lil Eddie - Fever (Armada Music)
- SICK INDIVIDUALS and Justin Prime featuring Bymia - Not Alone (Revealed Recordings)
- Devarsity x Onderkoffer x Justin Prime - KLAP (KLAP)
- NIVIRO and Justin Prime - Reloaded (Revealed Recordings)
- Justin Prime x Subliminals - Boom! (TurnItUp Muzik)
- Justin Prime and We Are Loud - Holding On (OneSeven)
- Justin Prime and Vito Mendez featuring Sensei Milla - Tear Dem Down (Smash The House)
- Justin Prime and Alejandro Reyes - Ladron (The Hana Road Music Group)
- SICK INDIVIDUALS and Justin Prime featuring Nevve - Guilty (Revealed Recordings)

2020

- Justin Prime and VIVID - Don't Stop (Zero Cool)
- Justin Prime and Reggio - Speaker Test (TurnItUp Muzik)
- 3 Are Legend x Justin Prime x Sandro Silva - Raver Dome (Smash The House/Ultra Records)
- Rave Republic and Justin Prime - Lionheart (TurnItUp Muzik)
- SICK INDIVIDUALS and Justin Prime featuring Lasada - Ocean (Revealed Recordings)
- Justin Prime and Subliminals - Buena Vida (TurnItUp Muzik)

2021

- Futuristic Polar Bears and Justin Prime - United We Stand (Cmmd Records)
- Justin Prime and Husman - Ninja (Rave Culture)
- Justin Prime and Vito Mendez - Rebirth of Sound (Maxximize Records)
- Justin Prime and SaberZ - Neutron (Rave Culture)
- Justin Prime and Onderkoffer - WTF? (Revealed Music)
- Justin Prime and Stvw - Knockout (Warner Music
- W&W, Sandro Silva and Justin Prime - This Is Our Legacy (Rave Culture)
- Justin Prime, Renato S and Drek's featuring Heleen - City of Starlight (NexChapter)

=== Remixes ===
- Malea - One Hot Mess (Justin Prime Remix)
- Moto featuring Jean Michel - Crying (Justin Prime Remix)
- Justin Caruso and Aude featuring Christina Novelli - Satellite (Justin Prime Remix)
- Asher Monroe - Hush Hush (Justin Prime Remix)
- Swedish House Mafia - Save The World (Justin Prime Remix)
- Iggy Azalea featuring Rita Ora - Black Widow (Justin Prime Remix)
- Rihanna and David Guetta – Right Now (Justin Prime Remix)
- Flo Rida featuring Jennifer Lopez – Sweet Spot (Justin Prime Remix)
- Rave Radio and Chris Willis – Feel The Love (Justin Prime Remix)
- Sandro Silva featuring Jack Miz – Let Go Tonight (Justin Prime Remix)

=== Co-productions ===
- Tiësto - Footprints (from the album A Town Called Paradise) (2014)
- U2 vs. Tiësto - Pride (In The Name Of Love) (from the album Dance (RED) Save Lives) (2013)
- Passion Pit - Carried Away (Tiësto Remix) (2013)
- Nelly Furtado - Parking Lot (Tiësto Remix) (2012)
- Youngblood Hawke - We Come Running (Tiësto Remix) (2012)

== Websites ==
- Official website
