= Honselersdijk =

- Town
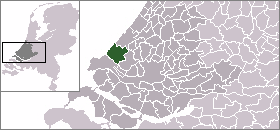

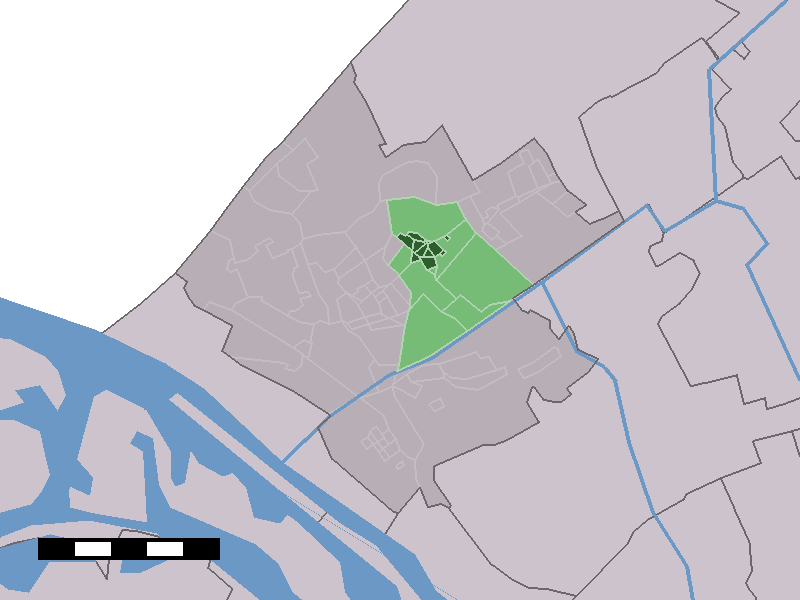
- The village (dark green) and the statistical district (light green) of Honselersdijk in the municipality of Westland.
- Coordinates: 52°0′N 4°14′E
- Country: Netherlands
- Province: South Holland
- Municipality: Westland

Population
  - Total: 7,366
- Time zone: UTC+1 (CET)
  - Summer (DST): UTC+2 (CEST)

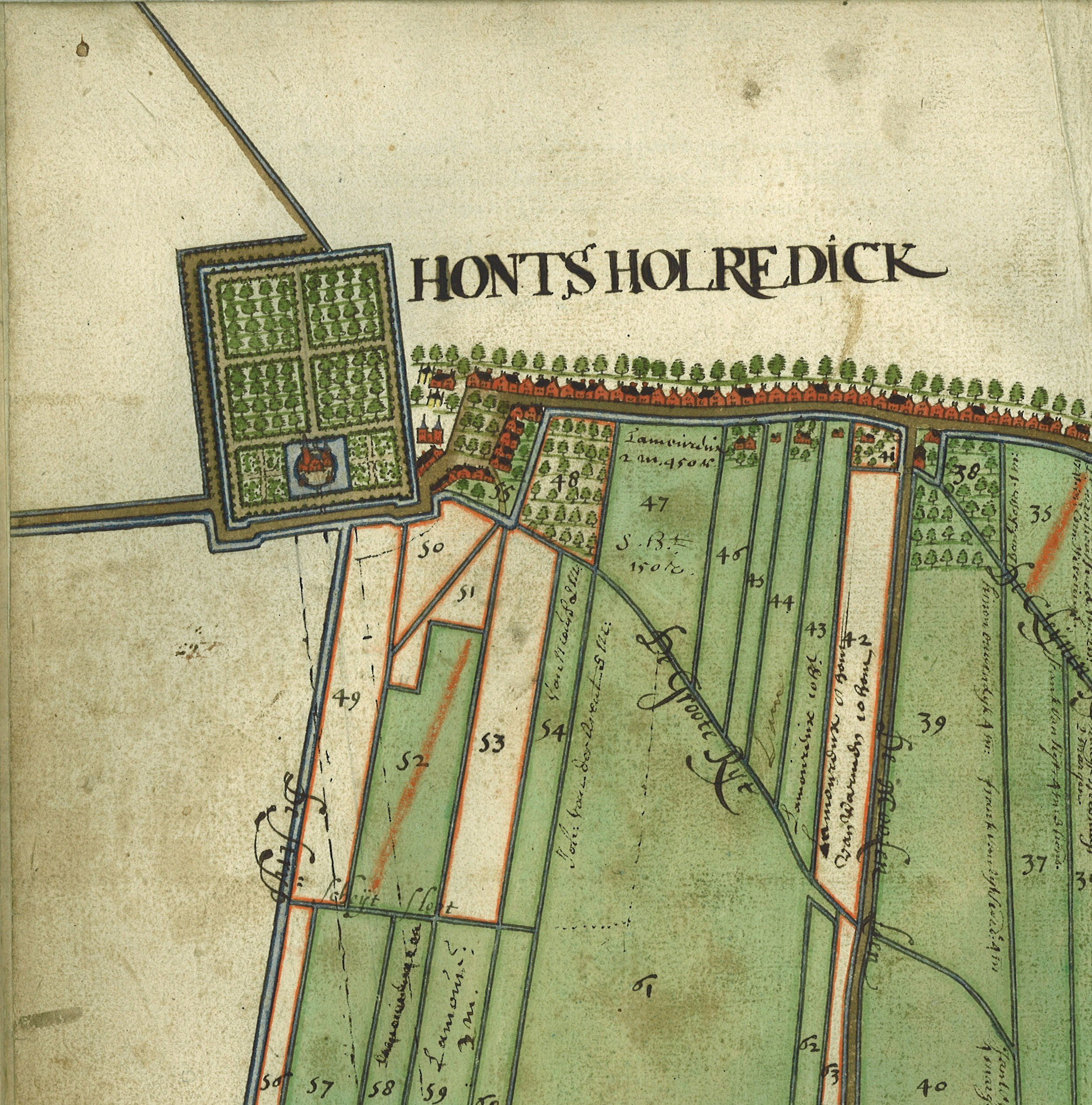
Map Honselersdijk 1620

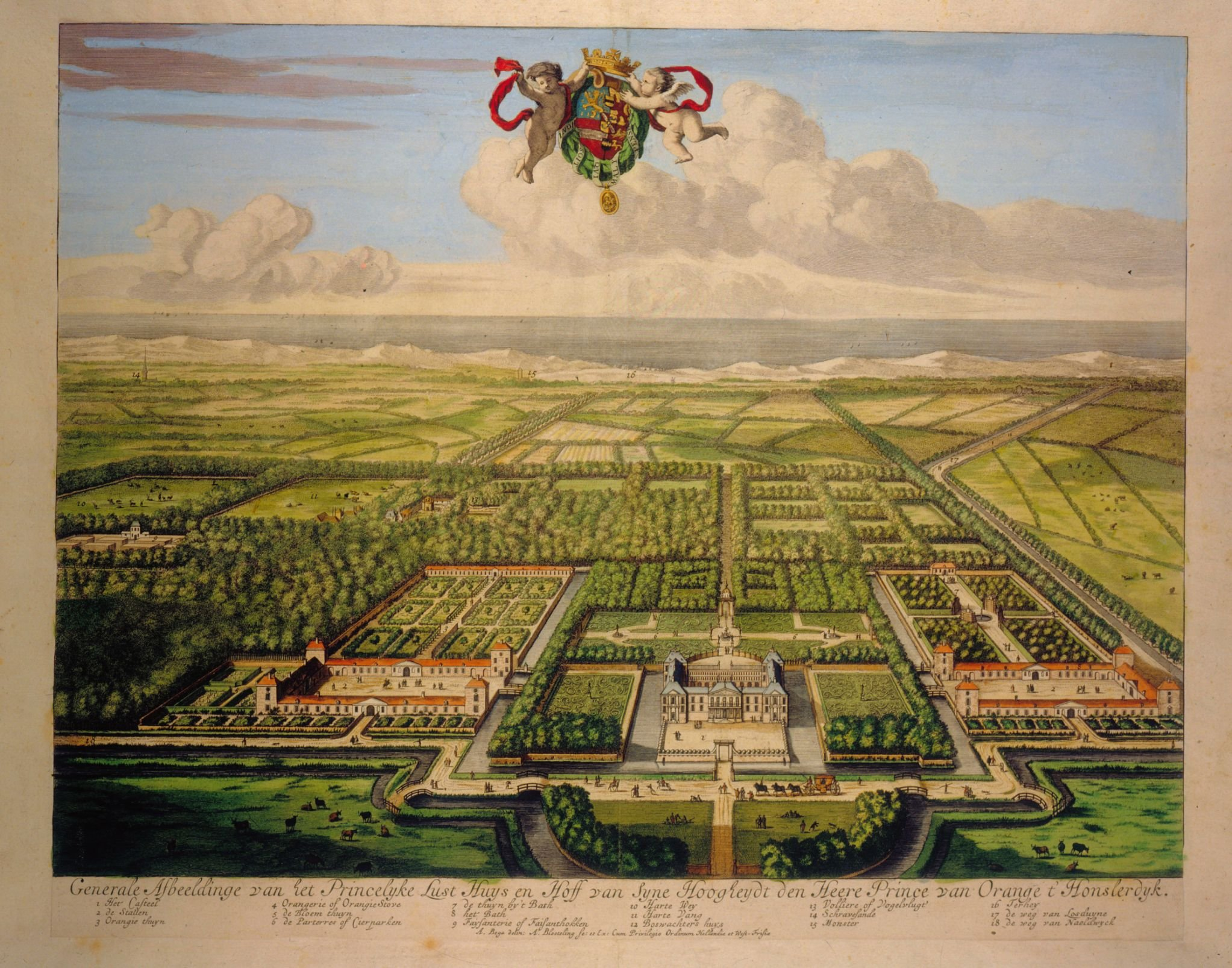
Paleis Honselaarsdijk

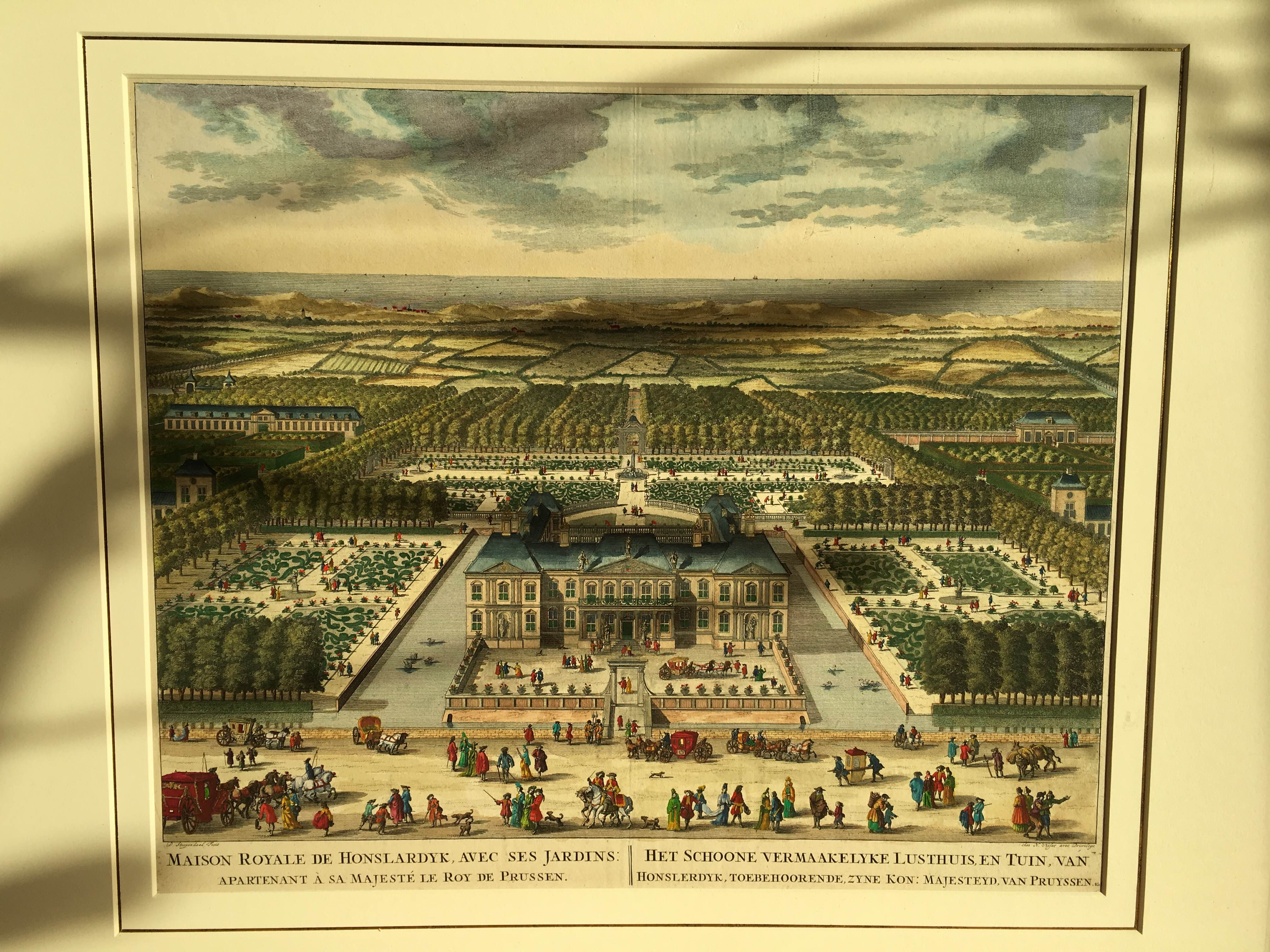
Huis Honselaarsdijk by Daniël Stopendaal, 1710

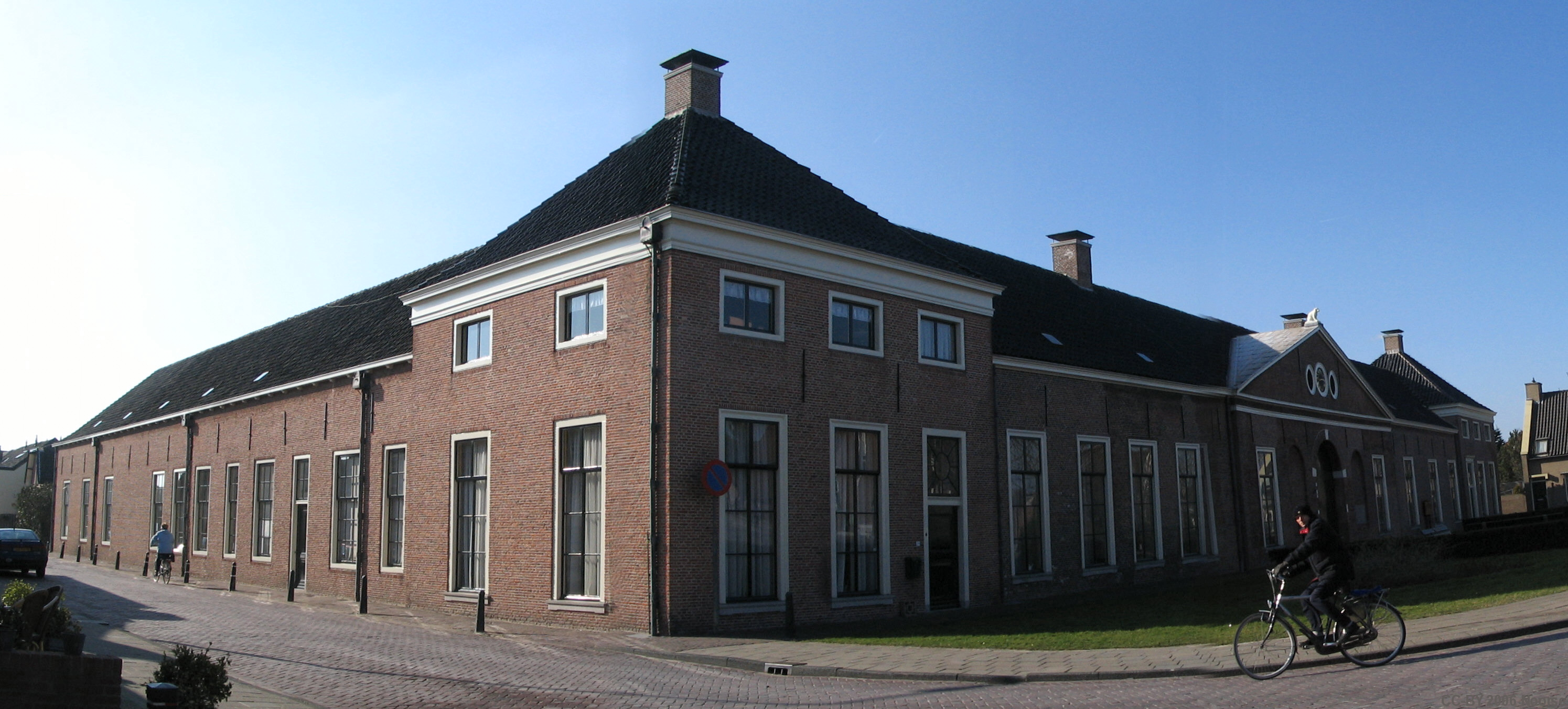
Exterior view of De Nederhof

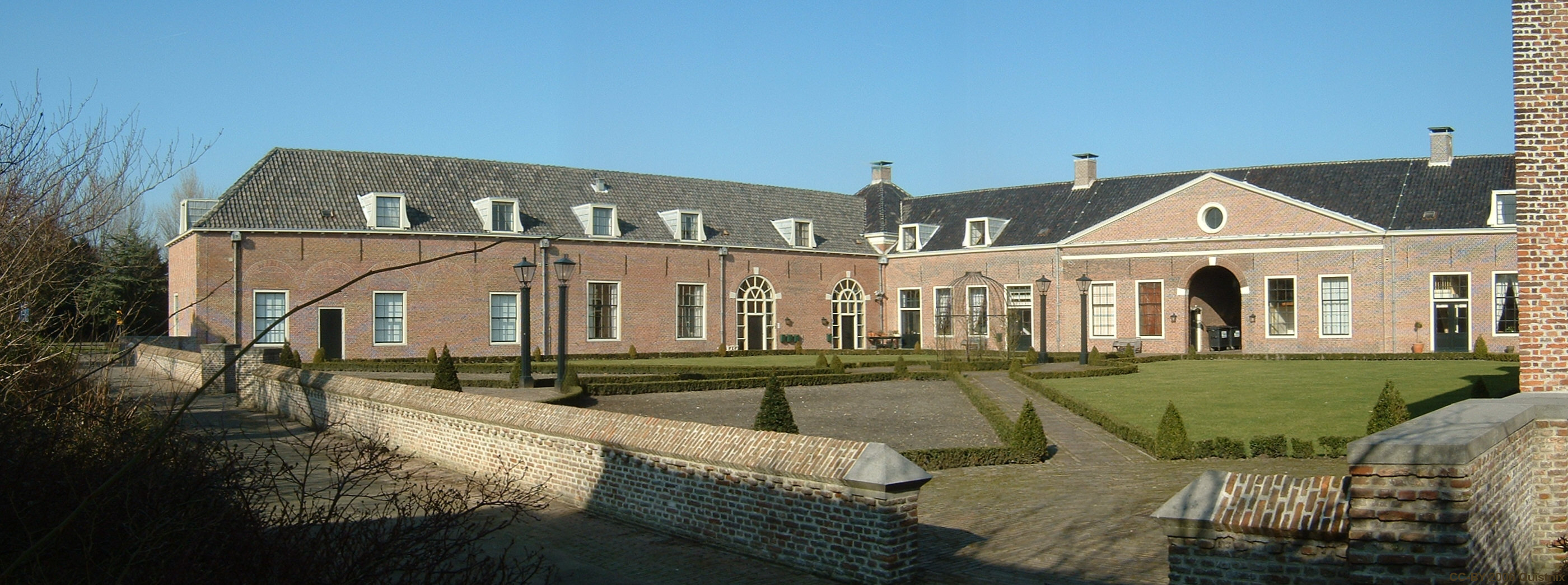
Courtyard of De Nederhof

Honselersdijk is a town in the Dutch province of South Holland. It is home to the historic Huis Honselaarsdijk, former palatial estate of the Dutch Princes of Orange. Huis Honselaarsdijk was one of the finest examples of Baroque architecture and grounds in the history of The Netherlands. Today, only part of the outbuildings remain, and these are referred to locally as "De Nederhof".

Honselersdijk is part of the municipality of Westland, and lies about 2.6 km (2 mi) southwest of the border of The Hague, with a population of approximately 5,180.

The statistical area "Honselersdijk", which also includes the surrounding countryside and part of the hamlet Mariëndijk, has a total population of approximately 7,460.

Today, Honselersdijk is home to one of the largest flower auctions in the world, Royal Flora Holland.

== History of Huis Honselaarsdijk ==
The earliest monumental property in Honselersdijk dates back to the 16th-century castle, which was constructed as a home for the Princes of Arenberg. It was subsequently acquired in 1612 by Prince Frederick Henry to be used as a hunting lodge and his primary summer residence.

The castle was demolished and replaced in the mid-17th century by a Baroque-inspired moated house and gardens. After the death of his father, Prince William II began a major reconstruction of the property, again inspired by Baroque architecture. Whilst not all of the original plans for galleries and pavilions were adhered to at that time, later William III and Mary would continue the adaptation of the property to become one of the most significant gathering points for the aristocracy en route to England or the city of The Hague.

After the death of King William III, the house was inherited by his cousin, King Frederick I. As the Prussian king and his family lived in Berlin, there was an inheritance dispute with the Frisian Nassau family. As a result, Huis Honselaarsdijk fell into disrepair. Due to negotiations between Frederick II the Great and Anne, Princess Royal and princess of Orange, the house was ultimately sold to her son prince William V in 1754.

Although there were plans for an extensive renovation, these were later considered too expensive and were abandoned. Thereafter, William V occasionally used the house for hunting purposes and the last residents were his sister princess Carolina and her husband Karl Christian, Prince of Nassau-Weilburg between 1760 and 1765.

During the French occupation the House was confiscated in 1795 and fell into further decay, when it was used as prison and hospital. After the restoration in the Netherlands in 1813, King William I was, regrettably, uninspired to save the house and it was ultimately demolished in 1815.

Currently, only part of the outbuildings remain, the Nederhof (the lower courtyard), which had been used as stables and guest quarters. Since its restoration in 1976, it is used as a foster home. The property will undergo further restoration work in 2016 to modernise the interior.

== Art and Architecture of Huis Honselaarsdijk ==
Prince Frederick Henry and his wife princess Amalia of Solms-Braunfels introduced the classical architecture in the Netherlands by building various large country houses and gardens, such as Huis Honselaarsdijk, Huis ter Nieuwburg and Huis ten Bosch. These house were inspired on French and Italian architecture, such as the Palais du Luxembourg in Paris and the Versailles palace of king Louis XIII.

With help of their secretary, Constantijn Huygens, Frederick Henry and Amalia selected architects Jacob van Campen and Pieter Post as their architects for the house. But they were also supported by several French artists such as the architect Simon de la Vallée and the gardener André Mollet. For the interior various artists were involved such as Gerard van Honthorst, Wybrand de Geest, Pieter de Grebber, Paulus Bor, Christiaen van Couwenbergh, Cornelis Vroom, Artus Quellinus the Elder.

The House served as inspiration for the City Palace of Potsdam built by the son in law of prince Frederick Henry, Frederick William, Elector of Brandenburg.
