= Sun Goes Down (David Guetta and Showtek song) =

Single by David Guetta and Showtek featuring Magic! and Sonny Wilson

from the album Listen
- Released: 31 July 2015
- Recorded: 2013–2014
- Genre: Electro house; reggae fusion; tropical house
- Length: 3:32
- Label: What a Music; Parlophone; Warner
- Songwriters: David Guetta; Giorgio Tuinfort; Wouter Janssen; Sjoerd Janssen; Nasri Atweh; Lukas Loules; Mark Pellizzer
- Producers: David Guetta; Showtek; Lukas Loules

David Guetta singles chronology
"Hey Mama" (2015)	"Sun Goes Down" (2015)	"Clap Your Hands" (2015)

Showtek singles chronology
"90's By Nature" (2014)	"Sun Goes Down" (2015)	"Believer" (2016)

Magic! singles chronology
"#SundayFunday" (2015)	"Sun Goes Down" (2015)	"Lay You Down Easy" (2016)

Sonny Wilson singles chronology
"Light It Up" (2015)	"Sun Goes Down" (2015)	"Boombox" (2015)

"Sun Goes Down" is a song by French producer David Guetta and Dutch duo Showtek, featuring vocals from Canadian reggae fusion band MAGIC! and Dutch singer Sonny Wilson. This is the second collaboration of Guetta with Showtek since "Bad" in 2014, and at the same time the second collaboration of Showtek and Sonny Wilson after "Booyah" in 2013. It was released as the fifth official single from Guetta's sixth studio album, Listen (2014).

== Track listing ==
Digital Remixes EP

1. "Sun Goes Down" (Extended) – 4:18
2. "Sun Goes Down" (Summer Remix) – 4:11
3. "Sun Goes Down" (Eva Shaw Remix) – 4:17
4. "Sun Goes Down" (Hugel Remix) – 4:33
5. "Sun Goes Down" (Tom & Jame Remix) – 5:00
6. "Sun Goes Down" (Brooks Remix) – 4:21

== Charts ==
=== Weekly charts ===
Chart (2015–16)	Peak position
Belgium (Ultratip Bubbling Under Flanders)	16
Belgium (Ultratip Bubbling Under Wallonia)	2
Czech Republic Airplay (ČNS IFPI)	79
France (SNEP)	37
Germany (GfK)	67
Hungary (Dance Top 40)	21
Hungary (Single Top 40)	16
Mexico Anglo (Monitor Latino)	20
Poland Airplay (ZPAV)	38
Poland Dance (ZPAV)	8

=== Year-end charts ===
Chart (2016)	Position
Hungary (Dance Top 40)	89

== Release history ==
Region	Date	Format	Label
Worldwide	31 July 2015	Digital download	What a Music; Parlophone
Italy	11 September 2015	Mainstream radio	Parlophone
