= Cannonball (Showtek and Justin Prime song) =

2012 song by Showtek and Justin Prime

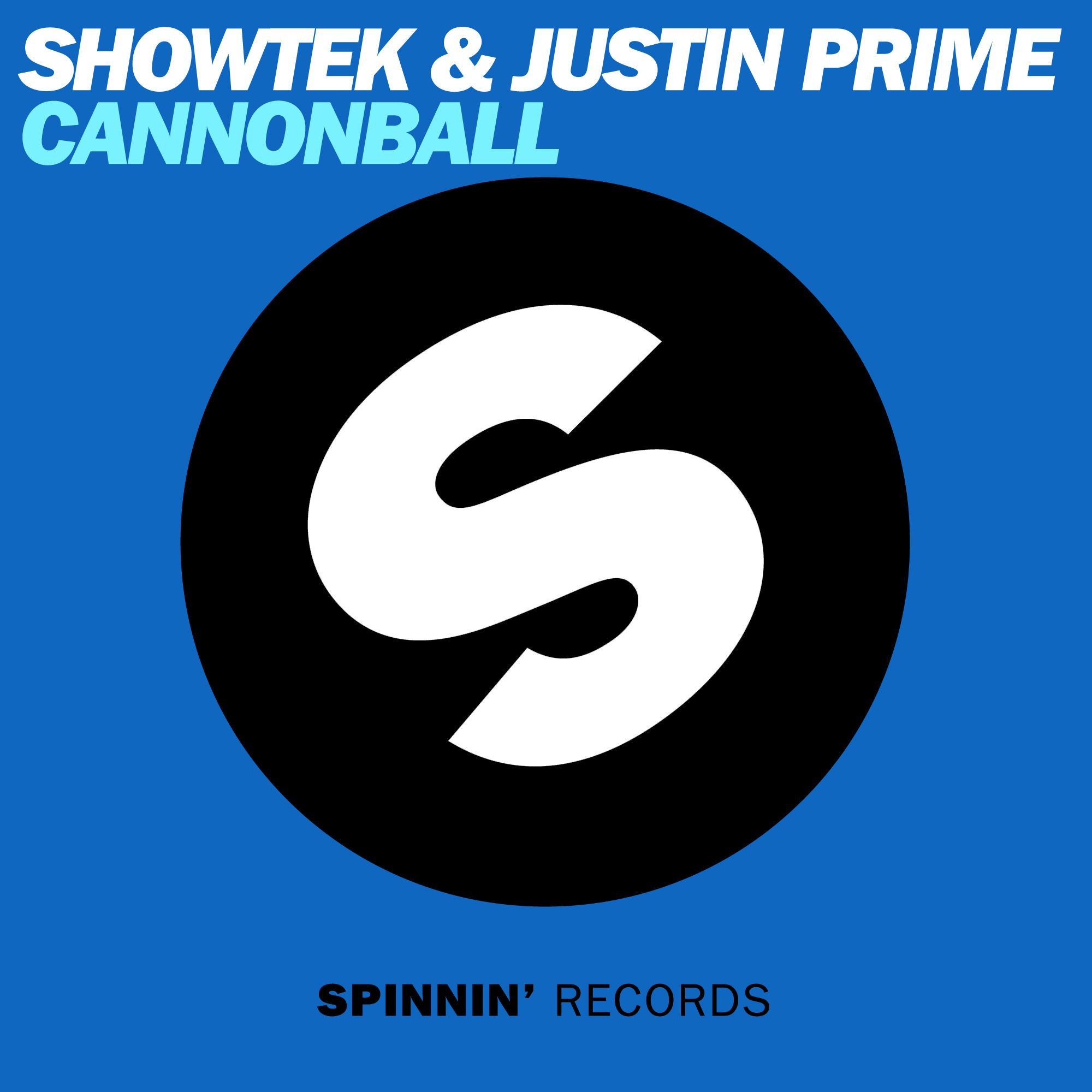

Single by Showtek and Justin Prime

from the album 360 Yellow
- Released: October 29, 2012 (Musical Freedom); January 7, 2013 (Spinnin' Records)
- Recorded: 2012
- Genre: Big room house
- Length: 3:22 (Radio Edit); 5:48 (Original Mix)
- Label: Musical Freedom; Spinnin' Records
- Songwriters: Sjoerd Janssen; Wouter Janssen; Justin Putuhena
- Producers: Showtek; Justin Prime

Showtek singles chronology
"How We Do" (2012)	"Cannonball" (2012)	"Slow Down" (2013)

Justin Prime singles chronology
"Revolt / Rise" (2012)	"Cannonball" (2012)	"Bring the Bass" (2013)

"Cannonball" is a song by Dutch electronic music duo Showtek and Dutch DJ Justin Prime. The song was released as a digital download on October 29, 2012 through Tiësto's label Musical Freedom and on January 7, 2013 through Spinnin' Records. The song was written and produced by Showtek and Justin Prime. The song has charted in Belgium, France and Netherlands, and was certified gold in the latter.

== Track listing ==
Digital download (single)
No.	Title	Length
1.	"Cannonball" (Radio Edit)	3:22
2.	"Cannonball"	5:48

Digital download (Carnage & Victor Niglio's Festival Trap Remix)
No.	Title	Length
1.	"Cannonball" (Carnage & Victor Niglio's Festival Trap Remix)	4:10

Digital download (Will Sparks Remix)
No.	Title	Length
1.	"Cannonball" (Will Sparks Remix)	4:03
2.	"Cannonball" (Will Sparks Extended)	6:01

== Charts ==
Chart (2012–13)	Peak position
Belgium (Ultratop 50 Flanders)	5
Belgium (Ultratop 50 Wallonia)	7
France (SNEP)	45
Netherlands (Dutch Top 40)	5

== Certifications ==
Region	Certification	Certified units/sales
Belgium (BRMA)	Gold	15,000^{*}
Netherlands (NVPI)	Gold	10,000^{^}
^{*} Sales figures based on certification alone.^{^} Shipments figures based on certification alone.

== Cannonball (Earthquake) ==
"Cannonball (Earthquake)"
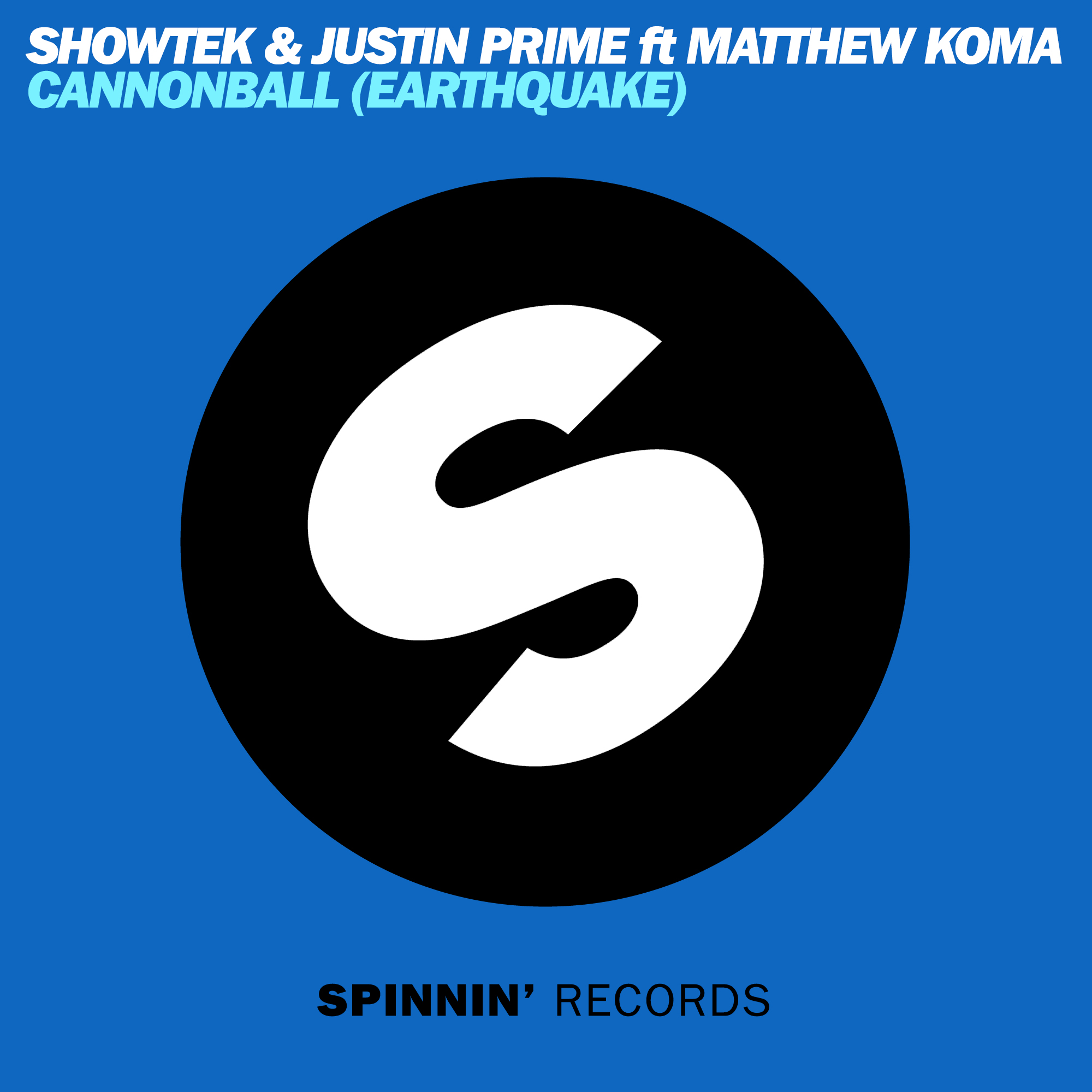

Single by Showtek and Justin Prime featuring Matthew Koma
- Released: December 16, 2013; April 11, 2014 (Remixes)
- Recorded: 2013
- Genre: Big room house
- Length: 3:06
- Label: Spinnin' Records; Polydor Records
- Songwriters: Sjoerd Janssen; Wouter Janssen; Justin Putuhena; Tim Pagnotta; Matthew Koma
- Producers: Showtek; Justin Prime

Showtek singles chronology
"Bouncer" (2014)	"Cannonball (Earthquake)" (2013)	"Wasting Our Lives (WLTP)" (2014)

Justin Prime singles chronology
"Poing!" (2013)	"Cannonball (Earthquake)" (2013)	"Thunderbolt" (2013)

Matthew Koma singles chronology
"Dare You" (2013)	"Cannonball (Earthquake)" (2013)	"Find You" (2014)

Music video
- "Cannonball (Earthquake)" on YouTube

Showtek and Justin Prime released a second version of the song titled "Cannonball (Earthquake)" featuring guest vocals from American singer Matthew Koma. It was released worldwide as a digital download on 16 December 2013. In the United Kingdom, it was released on April 11, 2014, where he managed to reach number 29 in the singles chart.

== Will Ferrell version ==
A version of the song sampling a sound bite of a scene from the 2004 comedy film Anchorman: The Legend of Ron Burgundy was played by Showtek in numerous shows titled "Cannonball (Will Ferrell Sit Down Mix)". This version of the song has never been released to the public.

=== Track listing ===
Digital download (Single)
No.	Title	Length
1.	"Cannonball (Earthquake)" (feat. Matthew Koma)	3:24

Digital download (Remixes)
No.	Title	Length
1.	"Cannonball (Earthquake)" (Radio Mix)	3:07
2.	"Cannonball (Earthquake)" (Brooks Remix)	6:05
3.	"Cannonball (Earthquake)" (M&F Remix)	4:03
4.	"Cannonball (Earthquake)" (Yellow Claw Remix)	2:58
5.	"Cannonball (Earthquake)" (Kryder Remix)	4:55
6.	"Cannonball (Earthquake)" (Extended Mix)	5:55

=== Charts ===
Chart (2014)	Peak position
Ireland (IRMA)	57
Poland Dance (ZPAV)	27
Scotland Singles (Official Charts)	19
UK Dance (Official Charts)	12
UK Singles (Official Charts)	29
US Hot Dance/Electronic Songs (Billboard)	24
