= Believer (Major Lazer and Showtek song) =

Single by Major Lazer and Showtek
- Released: September 30, 2016
- Recorded: 2015–16
- Genre: Trap; reggae fusion; hardstyle
- Length: 3:43
- Label: Mad Decent; Skink; 2-Dutch
- Songwriters: Thomas Pentz; Sjoerd Janssen; Wouter Janssen; Philip Meckseper; Muhammad Muwakil; Lou Lyons; Damian Marcano; Alexa Marcano; James Quashie
- Producers: Major Lazer; Showtek

Major Lazer singles chronology
"Cold Water" (2016)	"Believer" (2016)	"Run Up" (2017)

Showtek singles chronology
"Sun Goes Down" (2015)	"Believer" (2016)	"Your Love" (2018)

Music video
- "Believer" on YouTube

"Believer" is a song recorded by electronic music group Major Lazer, alongside Dutch production duo Showtek. It was released to digital download on September 30, 2016, through record labels Mad Decent and Skink.

== Background ==
Major Lazer and Showtek premiered the song in their set list under the name of "I'm a Believer" in April 2016. It was announced on September 26 that the song would be released as "Believer" on September 30.

== Music video ==
A video was directed by Christopher Louie, director of the EDM film XOXO and uploaded on January 3, 2017. Louie stated the video was inspired by the images of Omran Daqneesh, the Syrian boy whose home was bombed at night. "Like everyone in the world I was heartbroken by that image, but I also saw a glimmer of hope,” Louie said in a press release -- “As dark as the subject matter is, the point of our 'Believer' video was to capture the resilience of youth and the hope displayed by communities coming together to save victims from the rubble.”

== Charts ==
Chart (2016)	Peak position
Belgium (Ultratip Bubbling Under Flanders)	16
Belgium (Ultratip Bubbling Under Wallonia)	18
France (SNEP)	48
Netherlands (Dutch Top 40)	23
Netherlands (Single Top 100)	41
US Hot Dance/Electronic Songs (Billboard)	19

== Certifications ==
Region	Certification	Certified units/sales
France (SNEP)	Gold	66,666^{‡}
Netherlands (NVPI)	Platinum	40,000^{‡}
^{‡} Sales+streaming figures based on certification alone.

== Release history ==
Region	Date	Format	Label
Worldwide	September 30, 2016	Digital download	Mad Decent; Skink
