= Eva Shaw =

Canadian DJ, songwriter, record producer

- Born: Eva Shaw; Toronto, Ontario, Canada
- Genres: Electronic; hip hop; trap; pop
- Occupations: DJ; producer; songwriter; model
- Years active: 2013–present
- Labels: Fly Eye; Spinnin'; Wall Recordings; Mad Fatti
- Website: www.evashawmusic.com

Eva Shaw (born 24 February 1991), is a Canadian DJ, songwriter, record producer, and fashion model. Growing up, she was involved in acting, music and the arts. Shaw taught herself how to DJ and make beats as a hobby, ended up moving to New York City to pursue her dream of acting. Shaw's first single release "Charizma" was signed by Calvin Harris to his own label Fly Eye Records. She gained recognition from her follow up songs "Get Down" that reached No. 39 on the Billboard Hot Dance/Electronic Songs chart, "Space Jungle" which received over 40 million views, "Moxie" which was released on Afrojack's label in 2015, and "N2U" with singer Martha Wash. She had DJ residencies at Las Vegas nightclubs including Hakkasan in MGM Grand. In 2024, Shaw featured in episode four of the third season of Canadian comedy Shoresy.

== Discography ==
=== EPs ===
Title	Details
I Been Doing Great (with Nate Husser)	Released: April 10, 2020 (CA); Label: Mad Fatti; Formats: Digital download
Hype Hop 001	Released: Sept 17, 2021; Label: Mad Fatti; Formats: Digital download
Hype Hop 002	Released: Dec 31, 2021; Label: Mad Fatti; Formats: Digital Download
Solo	Released: June 17, 2022; Label: Mad Fatti; Formats: Digital Download
Hype Hop 003	Released: April 21, 2023; Label: Mad Fatti; Formats: Digital Download
On The Daw	Released: Oct 18, 2024; Label: Mad Fatti; Fomats: Digital download

=== Charting singles ===
Title	Year	Peak chart positions			Album
Title	Year	BEL (Vl)	BEL (Wa)	US (Dance/Elec)	Album
"Get Down" (with Hard Rock Sofa)	2014	–^{[A]}	–^{[A]}	39	Non-album single

=== Singles ===
- 2014 : "Charizma"
- 2014 : "Get Down" (with Hard Rock Sofa)
- 2014 : "Space Jungle" (Showtek edit)
- 2015 : "N2U" (with Showtek featuring Martha Wash)
- 2016 : "U" (featuring Sonny Wilson and Mally Mall)
- 2016 : "Rise N Shine" (featuring Poo Bear), also remixes
- 2017 : "High" (featuring Shaggy and Demarco) [Remixes]
- 2017 : "Ba Da Da Ding" (featuring Demarco and Aion Clarke)
- 2017 : "Shoulda Known Betta" (featuring Francci and City Fidelia)
- 2018 : "Voices" (featuring Najja and DiJiTAL)
- 2018 : "NT NT" (featuring Omar Kadir and City Fidelia)
- 2018 : "Lifeguard" (with Nebula and Bubi)
- 2018 : "Snakes" (with City Fidelia featuring Db Bantino)
- 2018 : "Miles Away" (with City Fidelia)
- 2018 : "What U Need" (with City Fidelia featuring Vincent Barry 2)
- 2018 : "Letter To The Side" (with City Fidelia)
- 2019 : "V in the Am" (with Booka Banks)
- 2019 : "Pop Out" (with ILLYMINIACHI)
- 2019 : "Free" (with Booka Banks)
- 2019 : "Home Invasion" (featuring Thouxanbanfauni)
- 2019 : "Do It Again" (featuring Roney and Jayy Brown)
- 2019 : "Strip" (with Thouxanbanfauni featuring Nate Husser)
- 2020 : "Foot On They Neck" (featuring Nate Husser)
- 2020 : "On Lock" (featuring Nate Husser & Just John)
- 2020 : "I Been Doing Great (You Can Stop MFing Asking)" (featuring Nate Husser)
- 2020 : "Knocked Off" (featuring Swagger Rite and Lord Afrixana)
- 2020 : "SPLASH GOD" (featuring Nate Husser)
- 2020 : "Dat Girl" (with Steve Walls featuring Red Rat)
- 2020 : "BOP" (featuring DillanPonders and Kris The $pirit)
- 2020 : "Don't Look Down" (featuring Telesca and El Chuape)
- 2020 : "Clap" (featuring Nate Husser, Nesi and Reeves Junya)
- 2020 : "The Weekend" (with Showtek and Spree Wilson)
- 2020 : "Addicted" (featuring Nate Husser, DB Bantino and ILLYMINIACHI)
- 2021 : "Static" (with Kofi and Ching)
- 2021 : "Hennessy" (with Yung Tory and BTK Villeion)
- 2021 : "Sleep Like a Baby" (with Nate Husser and Jean Deaux)
