= Huis Honselaarsdijk =

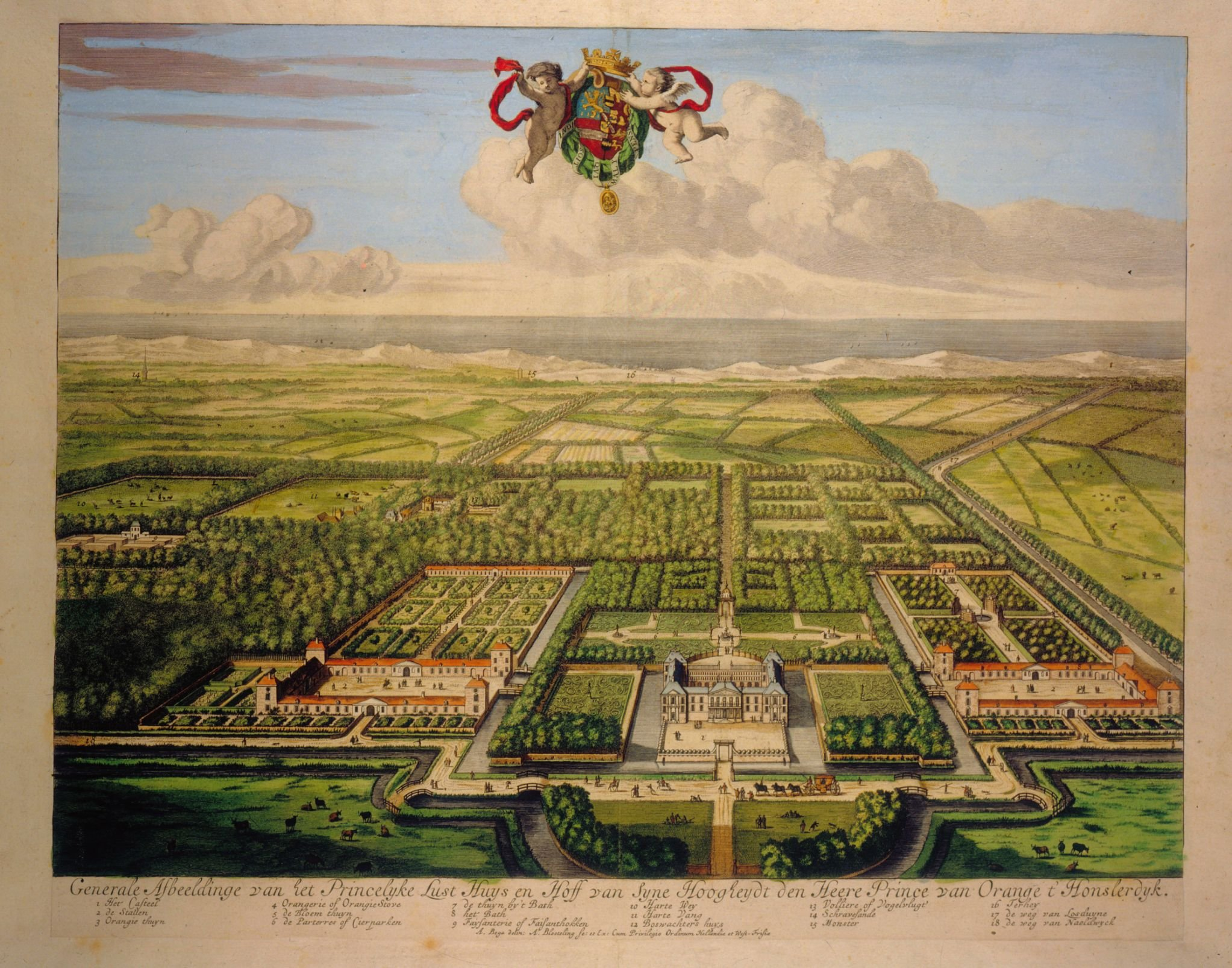
- Print ca. 1683 by Abraham Bega & Abraham Blooteling
- Interactive map of the Huis Honselaarsdijk area

General information
- Architectural style: Dutch Baroque architecture
- Location: Honselersdijk, Dutch Republic
- Coordinates: 52.006277°N 4.224544°E
- Completed: 17th century
- Demolished: 1815
- Client: Prince Frederick Henry

Design and construction
- Architects: Jacob van Campen, Pieter Post

Huis Honselaarsdijk is a former palace and country residence of the Dutch Stadtholders and princes of Orange which lies about 2.6 km (2 mi) southwest of the border of The Hague, Netherlands. It was one of the finest examples of Baroque architecture in The Netherlands. Today, only part of the outbuildings remain and are known locally as De Nederhof.

== History ==
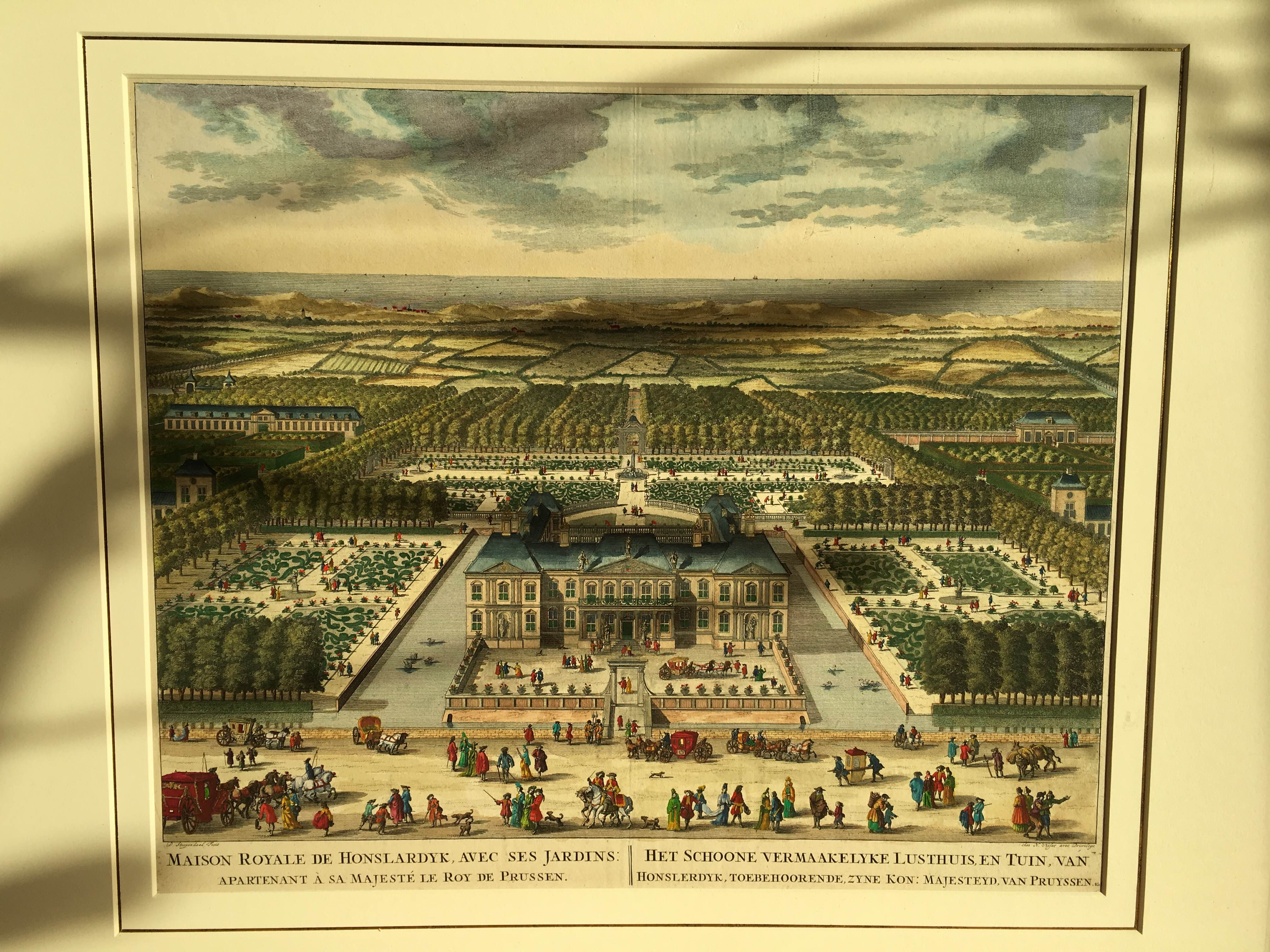
Huis Honselaarsdijk by Daniël Stoopendaal, 1710

The village of Honselersdijk already had a small castle in the Middle Ages. In the 16th century it belonged to the House of Arenberg, but they were on the Spanish side in the Eighty Years' War, and it was expropriated by the States of Holland and West Friesland and put at the disposal of Prince Maurice of Orange. His younger brother, Prince Frederick Henry bought the castle in 1612 to use it as hunting lodge and summer mansion. It became his primary country house and showplace of his power. The medieval castle was torn down and was replaced between 1621 and 1647 by a new moated house and gardens inspired by the French architecture of the Luxembourg Palace, but with distinct Dutch features.

After the death of his father, Prince William II completed the building of the house, although only a few of the planned extensions, such as galleries and pavilions, were created. Under William III and Mary the gardens were renovated and the house was adapted to the needs of its time (e.g. introduction of the sash window). The house was a rallying point for the various crossings to England or entrances to the city of The Hague.

After the death of king-stadtholder William III, the house was claimed by his cousin, King Frederick I in Prussia, just as various other country houses and palaces. The Prussian king and his family mostly lived in Berlin and because of an ongoing dispute about the inheritance with the King-Stadtholder's sole heirs in the Frisian Nassau branch, little or no maintenance was taken up and the house fell into disrepair. Due to negotiations between Frederick the Great and Anne, Princess Royal and Princess of Orange, the house was sold to her son Prince William V in 1754. There were plans for renovation, but considered too expensive. William V occasionally used the house only for hunting purposes. The last real residents were his sister Princess Carolina and her husband Karl Christian, Prince of Nassau-Weilburg between 1760 and 1765.

During the French occupation the house was confiscated in 1795 and fell into decay. It was used as prison and hospital. After the restoration in the Netherlands in 1813, King William I was not inspired to save the house and it was demolished in 1815.

Currently, only part of the outbuildings remains, the ‘Nederhof’ (the lower courtyard), which was used as stables and guest quarters. Since its restoration in 1976, it is used as a foster home.

== Art and architecture ==
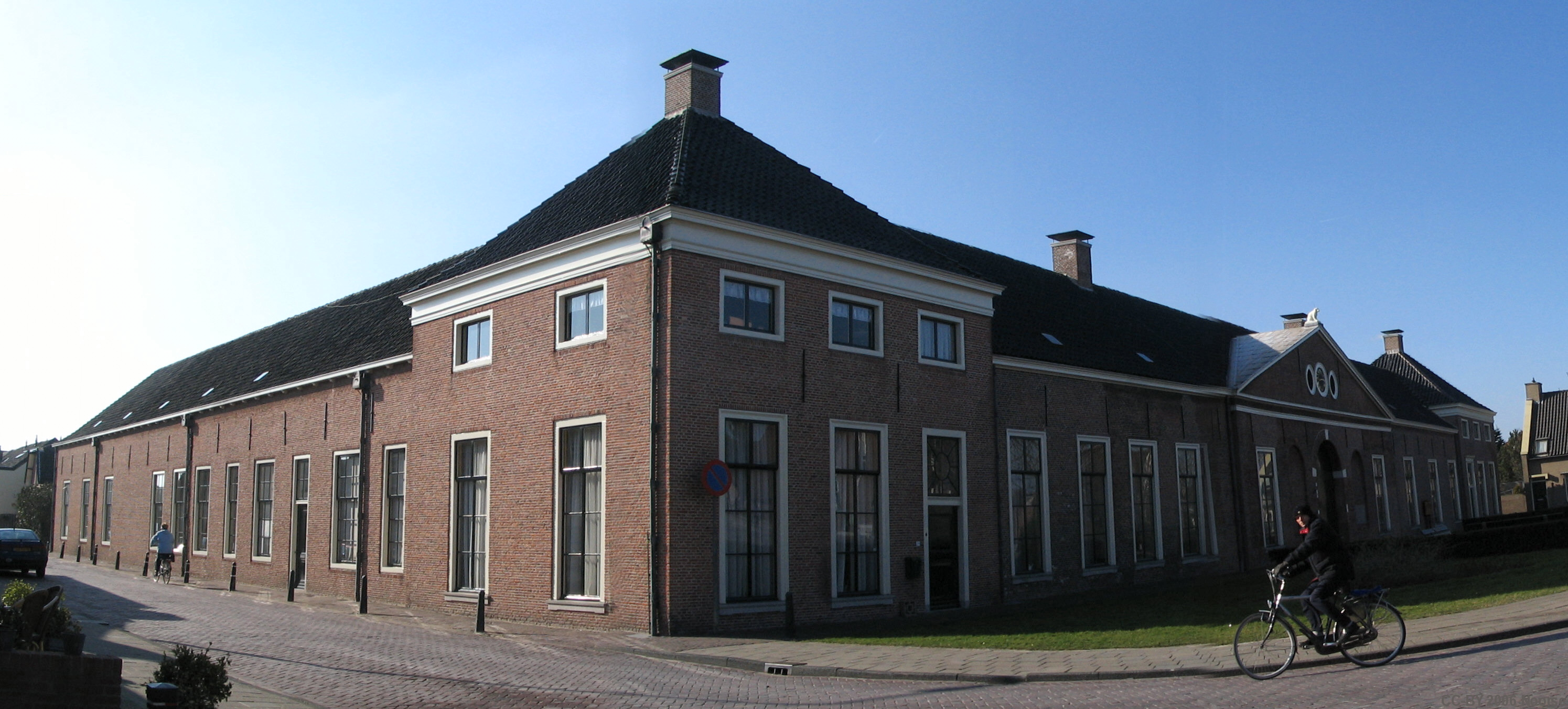
Exterior view of De Nederhof

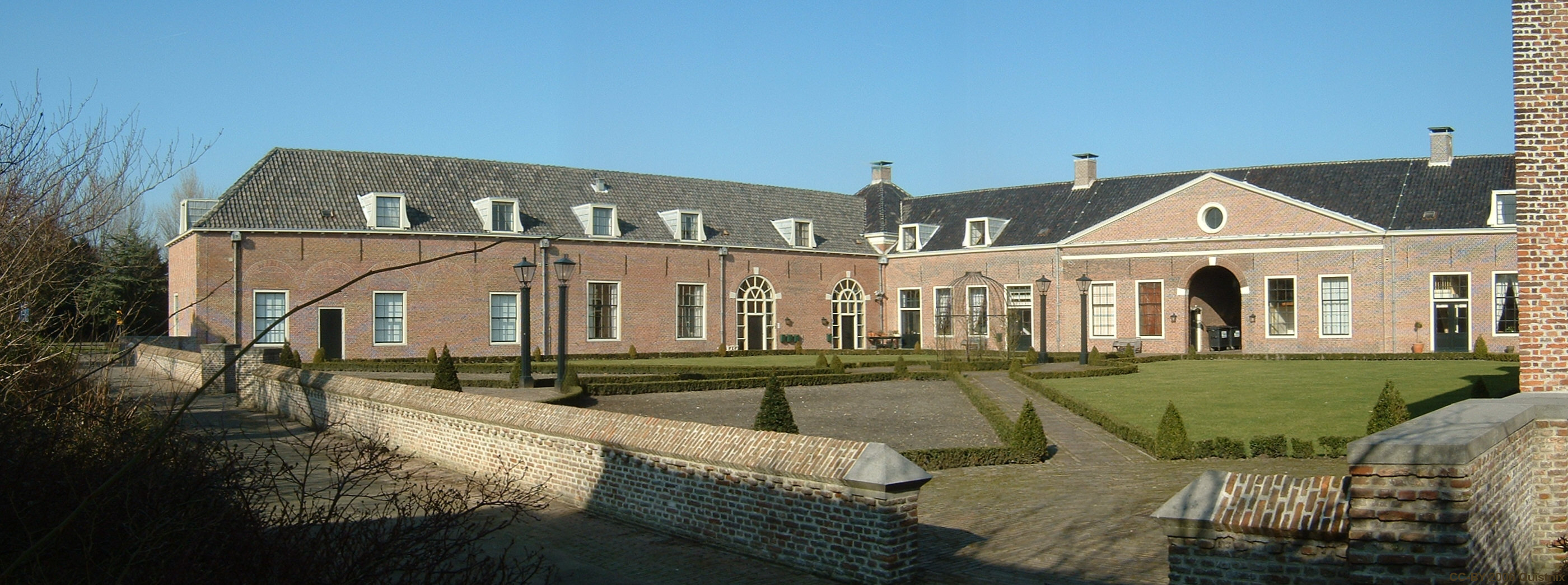
Courtyard of De Nederhof

Prince Frederick Henry and his wife princess Amalia of Solms-Braunfels introduced the classical architecture in the Netherlands by building various large country houses and gardens, such as Huis Honselaarsdijk, Huis ter Nieuwburg and Huis ten Bosch. These house were inspired on French and Italian architecture, such as the Luxembourg Palace in Paris and the Palace of Versailles of King Louis XIII.

With help of their secretary, Constantijn Huygens, Frederick Henry and Amalia selected architects Jacob van Campen and Pieter Post as their architects for the house. But they were also supported by several French artists such as the architect Simon de la Vallée and the gardener André Mollet. For the interior various artists were involved such as Gerard van Honthorst, Wybrand de Geest, Pieter de Grebber, Paulus Bor, Christiaen van Couwenbergh, Cornelis Vroom, Artus Quellinus the Elder.

The house served as inspiration for the City Palace, Potsdam, built by the son in law of Prince Frederick Henry, Frederick William, Elector of Brandenburg.
