= We Like to Party (Showtek song) =

Single by Showtek
- Released: 30 December 2013
- Recorded: 2013
- Genre: Electro house
- Length: 3:28 (radio edit); 4:41 (extended mix)
- Label: Spinnin'; Polydor; Skink
- Songwriter(s): Sjoerd Janssen; Wouter Janssen
- Producer(s): Showtek

Showtek singles chronology
"Booyah" (2013)	"We Like to Party" (2013)	"Bad" (2014)

“We Like to Party” is a song by Dutch production duo Showtek. It was released on 30 December 2013. In December 2014, Showtek released a vocal version of the song titled “Wasting Our Lives (WLTP)” featuring Tryna.

== Track listing ==
Digital download
No.	Title	Length
1.	"We Like to Party"	4:41

Digital download – radio edit
No.	Title	Length
1.	"We Like to Party" (radio edit)	3:28

Digital download
No.	Title	Length
1.	"We Like to Party" (Twoloud Remix)	4:51

== Chart performance ==
Chart (2014)	Peak position
Australia (ARIA)	88
Belgium (Ultratip Bubbling Under Flanders)	25
Belgium (Ultratip Bubbling Under Wallonia)	43
France (SNEP)	112
Netherlands (Dutch Top 40)	32
Netherlands (Single Top 100)	51

== Release history ==
Region	Date	Format	Label
Worldwide	30 December 2013	Digital download	Spinnin' Records, Polydor Records, Skink
