= Paulus Bor =

Dutch painter

- Born: 1601; Amersfoort, Dutch Republic
- Died: 10 August 1669 (aged 67–68); Amersfoort, Dutch Republic
- Other name: Orlando
- Known for: Painting
- Spouse: Aleijda van Crachtwijck (m. 1632)
- Father: Paulus Bor
- Patrons: Caravaggio, Pieter de Grebber, Salomon de Bray

Paulus Bor (Dutch: [ˈpʌulʏz ˈbɔr]; c. 1601 – 10 August 1669) was a Dutch artist, representative of the "Golden Age", member of the art society "Bentvueghels".

== Biography ==
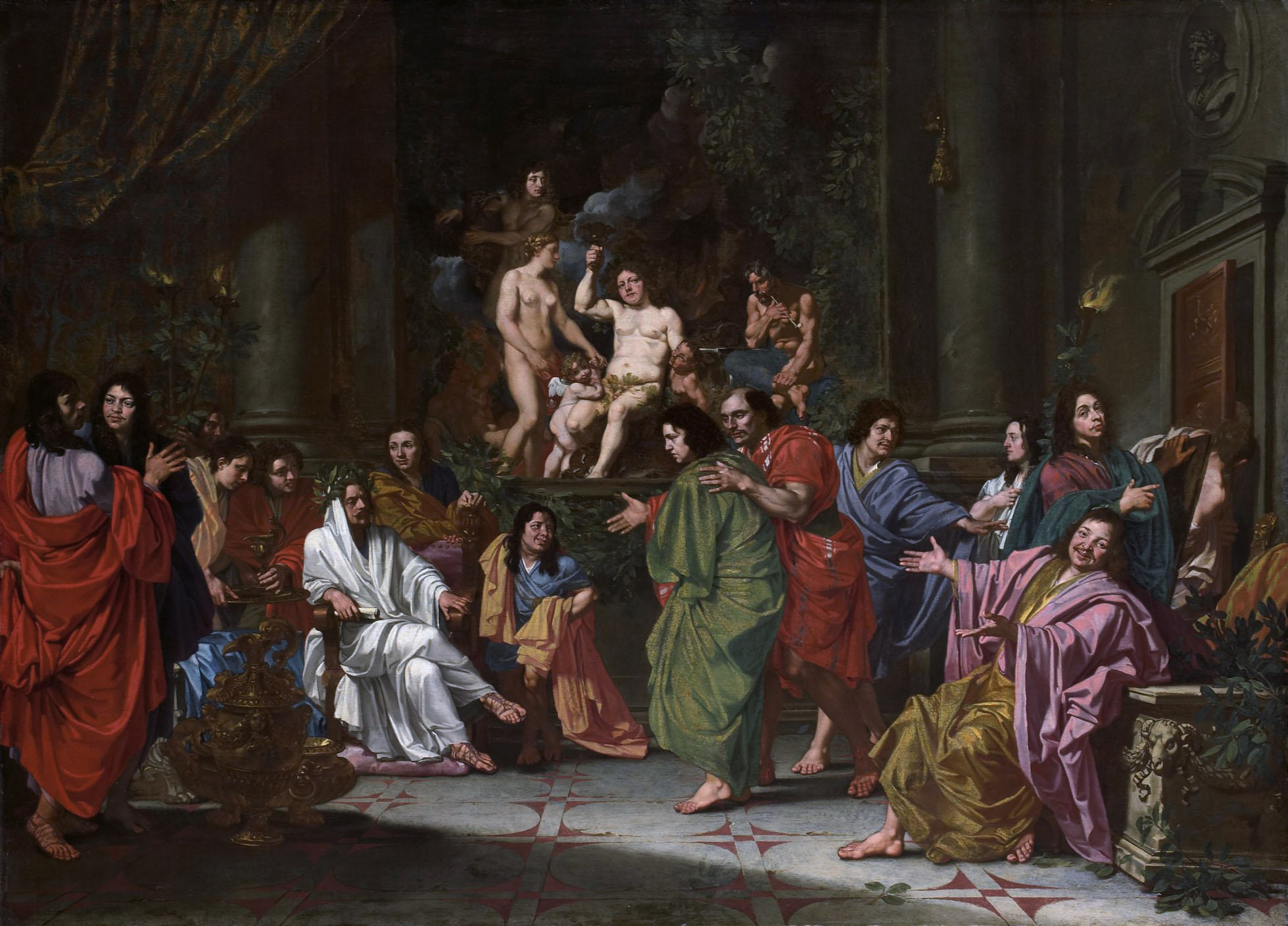
Unknown artist. The ritual of admission to membership in the society "Birds of a Feather", 1660

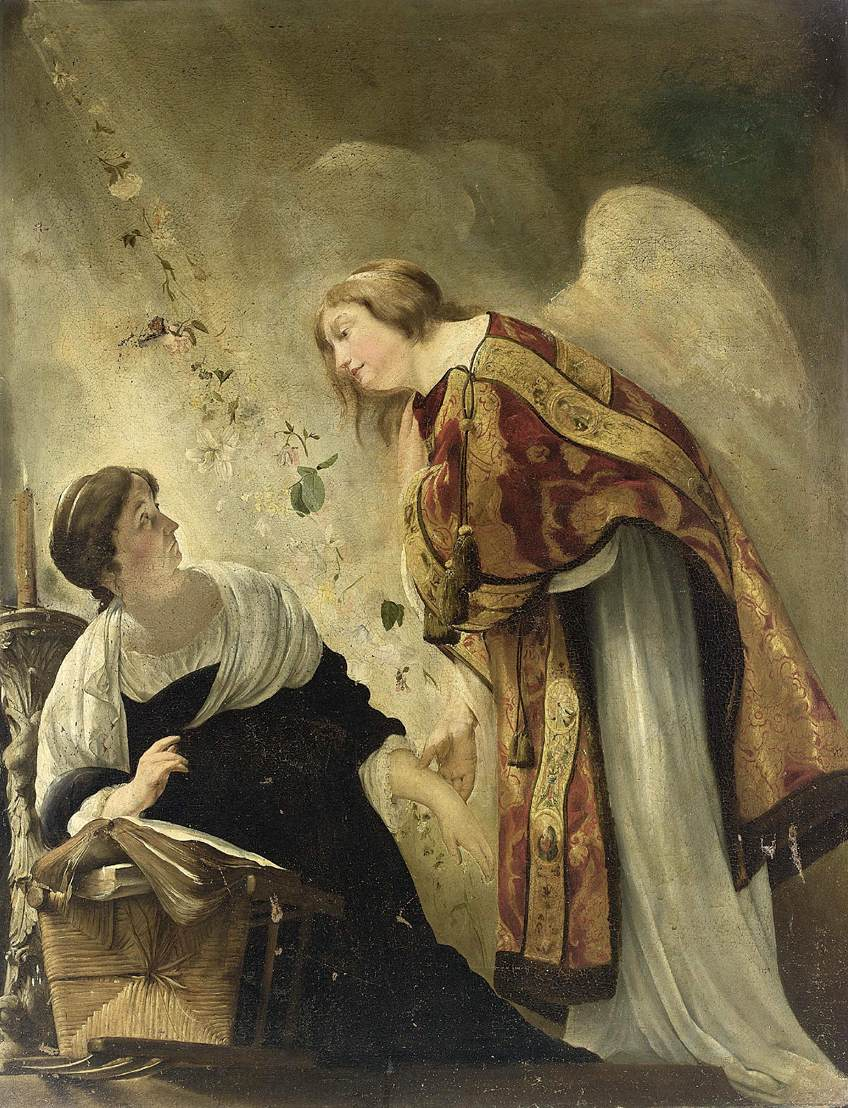
Paulus Bor, The Annunciation of the Virgin's Death, c. 1635–1640, National Gallery of Canada, Ottawa

Bor, who was born and died in Amersfoort, was descended from a notable Catholic family. He made a study trip to Rome, where he was one of the founders of the Bentvueghels, taking the nickname Orlando. He returned in 1626 to Amersfoort and joined Jacob van Campen in the decoration of the palace Honselaarsdijk belonging to Frederik Hendrik. In 1635, painted after a stay in Rome, significant is the work "La Maddalena". In 1656, he became regent of the godshuis "De Armen de Poth" in Amersfoort.

Bor's style of painting was rather at odds with that of contemporary painters from Utrecht. He initially painted rather Caravaggisti-like history paintings, but his works fast became marked by a classicism related to that of his townsman van Campen. Through unusual compositions and primitive technique, his paintings depict strange and mysterious subjects.

== Selected works ==
- The Annunciation of the Virgin's Death (Dutch: De Annunciatie door Gabriël aan de Maagd van haar ophanden zijnde dood), c. 1635–1640 (National Gallery of Canada, Ottawa)
