= Showtek =

Dutch electronic dance music duo

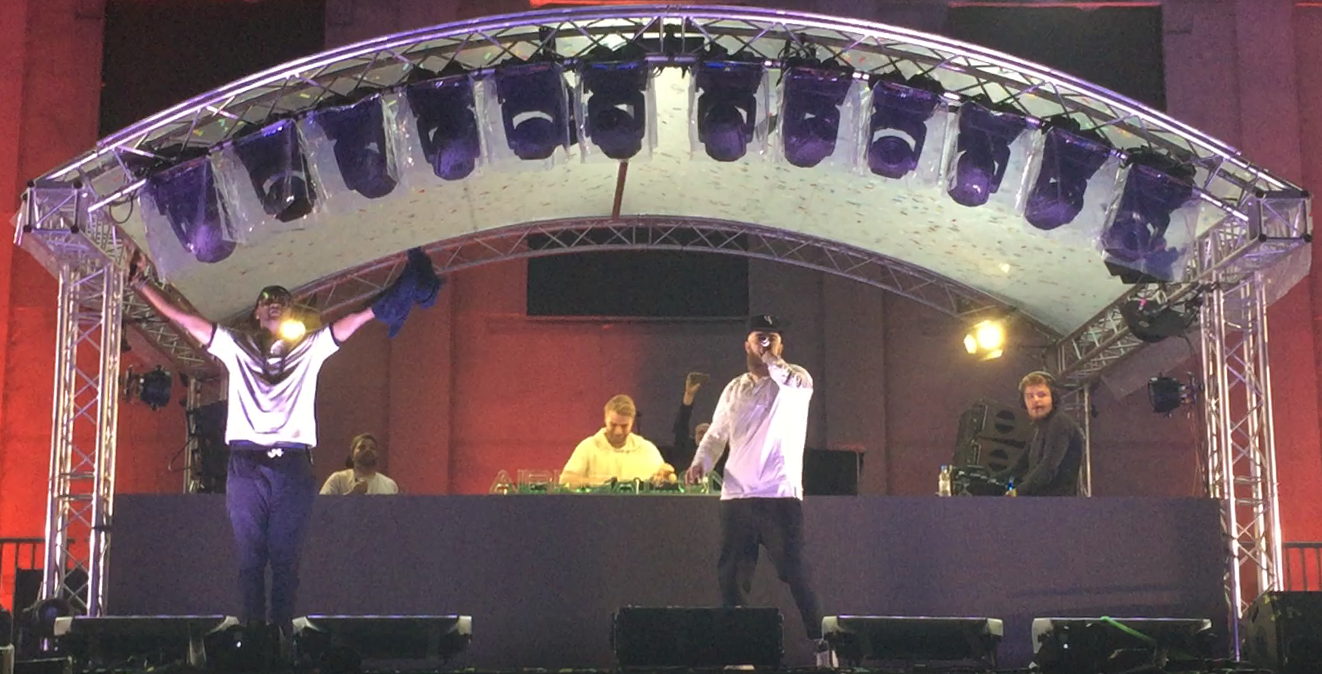
- Showtek (Wouter behind the decks; Sjoerd right sided) and singer GC playing live at Airbeat One Festival 2017.

Background information
- Origin: Eindhoven, Netherlands
- Genres: Techno; hardstyle; EDM; Dutch house; electro house; progressive house; big room house; future house; future bass
- Occupations: Record producers; musicians; songwriters
- Years active: 2001–present
- Labels: Q-dance; Skink; Musical Freedom; Revealed; Dutch Master Works; Owsla; Spinnin'; Armada Music
- Members: Wouter Janssen; Sjoerd Janssen
- Website: www.showtek.nl

Showtek is a Dutch electronic dance music duo consisting of two brothers from Eindhoven, Wouter Janssen (Dutch: [ˈʋʌutər ˈjɑnsə(n)]; born 20 August 1982). and Sjoerd Janssen (Dutch: [ɕuːr ˈtɕɑnsə(n)]; (Note: In isolation, Sjoerd and Janssen are pronounced [ɕuːrt] and [ˈjɑnsə(n)].) born 6 April 1984). The duo regularly manages to reach the top of multiple music charts and work with artists such as Tiësto, Chris Brown and David Guetta. Showtek was ranked 17th in the Top 100 DJs list of 2014 but by the magazine's 2016 list, they had dropped to 96th. The brothers, who have been musically active since 2001, also offer podcasts on their own radio show on the music streaming service iTunes.

== Biography ==
The brothers Wouter and Sjoerd Janssen began their musical career in electronic music, specifically in techno music in 2001 and subsequently moved to hardstyle in 2003. At that time, Wouter usually produced hard trance under the stage name of Walt, and Sjoerd hardstyle as Duro. They released their first album, Today Is Tomorrow in 2007 under their independent label Dutch Master Works. The album was well received in the Dutch music charts, reaching 68th place, and received a score of 95/100 on Partyflock. In 2009, their second album, Analogue Players in a Digital World, was unveiled at the Amsterdam Dance Event in the Netherlands and circulated by the Central Station Records. The album was well received by the press, which also allows them access to rewards. The duo uses multiple aliases including but not limited to; Dutch Masters, Headliner, Lowrider, Unibass, DJ Duro, Walt, Walt Janssen, Mr. Puta, Boys Will Be Boys and Alan Misael.

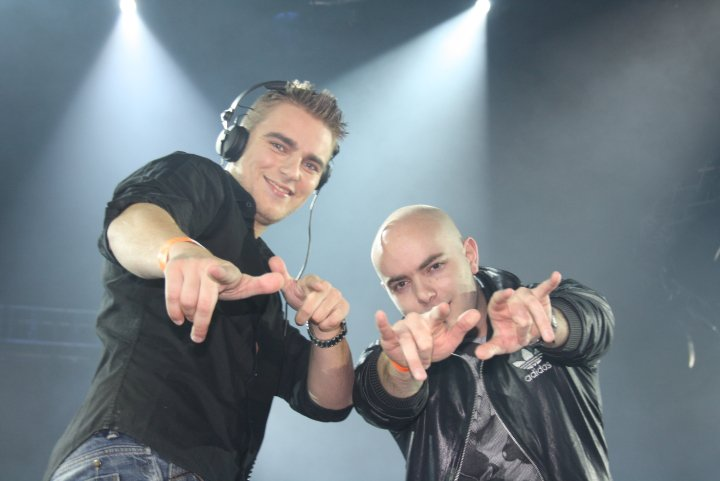
Showtek at Static X Copenhagen in 2010

In 2011, the group collaborated on the album Kiss from the Past by Allure, one of the musical projects of Dutch producer Tiësto. In 2012, they collaborated with Tiësto again on the singles "Miami / Chasing Summers" included in the album Club Life: Volume Two Miami, and on a single titled "Hell Yeah!". In 2012, the Showtek brothers began a series of collaborations, a project called Crazy Collabs, with producers from some of the other genres in dance music. Before the official announcement of their collaboration, they co-produced an EP with Tiësto and Angger Dimas entitled "We Rock" as Boys Will Be Boys. They have also worked with Tiësto, Hardwell, Justin Prime, Bassjackers, Ookay, MAKJ, and Noisecontrollers. Showtek also co-produced the upcoming single of Chris Brown entitled Nobody's Perfect with Lukas Hilbert and David Jost. Showtek has their own podcast, which is available through their website and iTunes.

In December 2013, the duo recently founded their own label "Skink", which is licensed to Spinnin Records but isn't a sub-label. The song "We Like To Party" by Showtek was the first title to be released under the new label.

In 2014, they collaborate with Vassy and David Guetta for the single "Bad", which was listed for 239 weeks on 19 different music charts.

In 2023, Showtek re-entered the hardstyle industry with their first public appearance on Qlimax: Enter The Void, 15 years after their last gig. They also confirmed their upcoming hardstyle album, set to be released in 2024 to accompany their hardstyle-only set. The album, titled "360 Blue", was released on 20 June 2024.

== Discography ==
=== Albums ===
==== Studio albums ====
List of studio albums
Title	Album details
Today Is Tomorrow	Released: 19 April 2007; Label: Dutch Master Works; Formats: CD, digital download
Analogue Players in a Digital World	Released: 23 October 2009; Label: Dutch Master Works; Formats: CD, digital download
360 Yellow	Released: 17 November 2023; Label: Skink; Formats: Digital download
360 Blue	Released: 20 June 2024; Label: Skink; Formats: Vinyl, Digital download

==== Compilation albums ====
List of compilation albums
Title	Album details
Essentials	Released: 18 September 2015; Label: Farm Records; Formats: CD, digital download
Essentials, Vol 2	Released: 7 October 2020; Label: Farm Records; Formats: CD, digital download

==== Mix albums ====
List of mix albums
Title	Album details
Skinkalation, Vol. 1	Released: 12 October 2015; Label: Skink, Spinnin' Records, 2-Dutch; Format: Digital download

=== Extended plays ===
List of extended plays
Title	Extended play details
Skinkalation, Vol. 2	Released: 30 May 2016; Label: Skink, Armada Music, 2-Dutch; Format: Digital download
Amen	Released: 26 July 2017; Label: Skink, Armada Music, 2-Dutch; Format: Digital download
EDM Sucks / Island Boy	Released: 22 November 2019; Label: Skink; Format: Digital download

=== Singles ===
List of singles as lead artist, with selected chart positions, showing year released and album name
Title	Year	Peak chart positions										Certifications	Album
Title	Year	NLD	AUS	AUT	BEL	FRA	GER	IRL	SWE	SWI	UK	Certifications	Album
"Save the Day / Bassment"	2001	—	—	—	—	—	—	—	—	—	—		Today Is Tomorrow
"Controller"	2001	—	—	—	—	—	—	—	—	—	—		Non-album single
"Seid Ihr Bereid"	2003	98	—	—	—	—	—	—	—	—	—		Today Is Tomorrow
"Save the Day Again"	2004	—	—	—	—	—	—	—	—	—	—		Non-album singles
"Choruz"	2004	—	—	—	—	—	—	—	—	—	—		Non-album singles
"Brain Crackin'"	2005	—	—	—	—	—	—	—	—	—	—		Today Is Tomorrow
"Rockin' Steady / I Like the Bass" (vs. Deepack)	2005	—	—	—	—	—	—	—	—	—	—		Non-album single
"Puta Madre"	2006	—	—	—	—	—	—	—	—	—	—		Today Is Tomorrow
"3 the Hard Way / Bangin'" (vs. Gizmo)	2006	—	—	—	—	—	—	—	—	—	—		Today Is Tomorrow
"The Colour of the Harder Styles (Defqon 1 Anthem 2006)"	2006	47	—	—	—	—	—	—	—	—	—		Today Is Tomorrow
"Shout Out" (featuring MC DV8)	2007	—	—	—	—	—	—	—	—	—	—		Today Is Tomorrow
"FTS"	2007	—	—	—	—	—	—	—	—	—	—		Today Is Tomorrow
"Born 4 Thiz / Raver" (featuring MC DV8)	2007	—	—	—	—	—	—	—	—	—	—		Today Is Tomorrow
"We Live for the Music / Scratch"	2008	—	—	—	—	—	—	—	—	—	—		Non-album singles
"Skitzo" / "Steady Rockin'"	2008	—	—	—	—	—	—	—	—	—	—		Non-album singles
"Black 2008"	2008	—	—	—	—	—	—	—	—	—	—		Non-album singles
"Hold Us Back / Back 2 Skool / Back 2 Reality" (featuring MC DV8)	2008	—	—	—	—	—	—	—	—	—	—		Non-album singles
"Apologize"	2008	—	—	—	—	—	—	—	—	—	—		Non-album singles
"Down Under (X-Qlusive Showtek Australia Anthem)"	2008	—	—	—	—	—	—	—	—	—	—		Non-album singles
"Dominate" / "Partylover"	2009	—	—	—	—	—	—	—	—	—	—		Non-album singles
"World Is Mine" / "We Speak Music"	2009	—	—	—	—	—	—	—	—	—	—		Analogue Players in a Digital World
"Freak" / "Fast Life" / "Here We Fucking Go"	2009	—	—	—	—	—	—	—	—	—	—		Analogue Players in a Digital World
"Electronic Stereo-Phonic" / "Laa-Di-Fucking-Daa" / "My 303"	2009	—	—	—	—	—	—	—	—	—	—		Analogue Players in a Digital World
"Analogue Players in a Digital World" / "Rockchild"	2010	—	—	—	—	—	—	—	—	—	—		Analogue Players in a Digital World
"Dutchie"	2010	—	—	—	—	—	—	—	—	—	—		Analogue Players in a Digital World
"Expansion"	2010	—	—	—	—	—	—	—	—	—	—		Non-album single
"Generation Kick & Bass" / "We Live for the Music" / "Loco"	2010	—	—	—	—	—	—	—	—	—	—		Analogue Players in a Digital World
"Beats of Life" (featuring MC Stretch)	2010	—	—	—	—	—	—	—	—	—	—		Fuck the System
"Breakbeat Junkie"	2010	—	—	—	—	—	—	—	—	—	—		Fuck the System
"Music on My Mind" (featuring Lexi Jean)	2011	—	—	—	—	—	—	—	—	—	—		Non-album single
"F-Track"	2011	—	—	—	—	—	—	—	—	—	—		Analogue Players in a Digital World
"Dirty Hard"	2011	—	—	—	—	—	—	—	—	—	—		Non-album singles
"Memories"	2012	—	—	—	—	—	—	—	—	—	—		Non-album singles
"Hell Yeah!" (with Tiësto)	2012	—	—	—	—	—	—	—	—	—	—		Essentials
"How We Do" (with Hardwell)	2012	91	—	—	—	—	—	—	—	—	—		Essentials
"Cannonball" (with Justin Prime)	2012	6	—	—	5	45	—	—	—	—	—	NVPI: Gold; BEA: Gold	Essentials
"Hey!" (with Bassjackers)	2012	—	—	—	—	—	—	—	—	—	—		Essentials
"Slow Down (Anthem Emporium 2013)"	2013	23	—	—	16	15	—	—	—	—	—		Essentials
"Get Loose" (with Noisecontrollers)	2013	32	—	—	129	—	—	—	—	—	—		Essentials
"Booyah" (featuring We Are Loud! and Sonny Wilson)	2013	15	87	50	23	22	56	40	56	45	5	BPI: Silver; IFPI: Gold	Essentials
"We Like to Party"	2013	51	—	—	25	112	—	—	—	—	—		Essentials
"Bad" (with David Guetta featuring Vassy)	2014	13	5	15	6	6	19	33	2	28	22	ARIA: Platinum; BPI: Platinum	Listen
"Bouncer" (with Ookay)	2014	—	—	—	98	—	—	—	—	—	—		Essentials
"Cannonball (Earthquake)" (with Justin Prime featuring Matthew Koma)	2014	—	—	—	—	—	—	59	—	—	29		Essentials
"Wasting Our Lives (WLTP)" (featuring Tryna)	2014	—	—	—	100	—	—	—	—	—	—		Essentials
"90's By Nature" (featuring MC Ambush)	2014	90	—	—	70	—	—	—	—	—	—		Skinkalation, Vol. 1
"Satisfied" (featuring Vassy)	2015	—	—	—	—	—	—	—	—	—	—		Skinkalation, Vol. 1
"Sun Goes Down" (with David Guetta featuring Magic! and Sonny Wilson)	2015	—	—	—	52	39	67	—	—	—	—		Listen
"N2U" (with Eva Shaw featuring Martha Wash)	2015	—	—	—	—	—	—	—	—	—	—		Essentials Vol. 2
"Mellow" (with Technoboy and Tuneboy)	2016	—	—	—	—	—	—	—	—	—	—		Essentials Vol. 2
"Swipe"	2016	—	—	—	—	—	—	—	—	—	—		Essentials Vol. 2
"Believer" (with Major Lazer)	2016	41	—	—	—	48	—	—	—	—	—	NVPI: Platinum	Essentials Vol. 2
"On Our Own" (with Brooks featuring Natalie Major)	2017	—	—	—	—	—	—	—	—	—	—		Essentials Vol. 2
"Natural Blues" (with Moby)	2018	—	—	—	—	—	—	—	—	—	—		Essentials Vol. 2
"Your Love" (with David Guetta)	2018	—	—	—	—	83	70	—	32	53	—		7
"Down Easy" (with MOTi featuring Starley and Wyclef Jean)	2018	—	—	—	—	—	—	—	— (Note: "Down Easy" did not enter the Swedish Singellista Chart, but peaked at number seven on the Swedish Heatseeker Chart.)	—	—		Non-album single
"Momma" (featuring Earl St. Clair)	2019	—	—	—	—	—	—	—	—	—	—		Essentials Vol. 2
"Listen to Your Momma" (featuring Leon Sherman)	2019	—	—	—	—	—	—	—	—	—	—		Essentials Vol. 2
"We Found Love" (with Sultan & Shepard)	2019	—	—	—	—	—	—	—	—	—	—		Echoes of Life: Day
"Way We Used 2" (with Sultan & Shepard)	2019	—	—	—	—	—	—	—	—	—	—		Essentials Vol. 2
"Rave" (with Steve Aoki and Makj featuring Kris Kiss)	2019	—	—	—	—	—	—	—	—	—	—		Neon Future IV
"EDM Sucks" (with Gammer)	2019	—	—	—	—	—	—	—	—	—	—		EDM Sucks / Island Boy
"Island Boy" (with Dropgun featuring Elephant Man & GC)	2019	—	—	—	—	—	—	—	—	—	—		EDM Sucks / Island Boy
"Straight Shots" (with Linka & Mondello' G featuring GC)	2019	—	—	—	—	—	—	—	—	—	—		EDM Sucks / Island Boy
"The Weekend" (with Spree Wilson featuring Eva Shaw)	2020	—	—	—	—	—	—	—	—	—	—		Essentials Vol. 2
"Show Some Love" (featuring Sonofsteve)	2020	—	—	—	—	—	—	—	—	—	—		Non-album singles
"Pum Pum" (with Sevenn)	2021	—	—	—	—	—	—	—	—	—	—		Non-album singles
"Mercy / Misbehaving"	2021	—	—	—	—	—	—	—	—	—	—		Non-album singles
"What Is Love" (featuring Theresa Rex)	2021	—	—	—	—	—	—	—	—	—	—		Non-album singles
"Wij Zijn Eindhoven"	2022	—	—	—	—	—	—	—	—	—	—		Non-album singles
"Pour It Down" (with Vérité)	2022	—	—	—	—	—	—	—	—	—	—		360 Yellow
"Live In A Bubble" (with LIIV)	2022	—	—	—	—	—	—	—	—	—	—		Non-album singles
"Welcome Back Home" (featuring MC Ambush)	2022	—	—	—	—	—	—	—	—	—	—		Non-album singles
"Burn" (with Timmy Trumpet)	2022	—	—	—	—	—	—	—	—	—	—		360 Yellow
"Free" (with Silverland)	2022	—	—	—	—	—	—	—	—	—	—		Non-album singles
"In My Soul" (with Lockdown)	2022	—	—	—	—	—	—	—	—	—	—		Non-album singles
"One Life" (with Sonofsteve)	2022	—	—	—	—	—	—	—	—	—	—		360 Yellow
"Everybody" (with Eday)	2023	—	—	—	—	—	—	—	—	—	—		360 Yellow
"BT1" (with Ookay)	2023	—	—	—	—	—	—	—	—	—	—		360 Yellow
"Happy"	2023	—	—	—	—	—	—	—	—	—	—		360 Yellow
"Dream" (with Timmy Trumpet)	2023	—	—	—	—	—	—	—	—	—	—		360 Yellow
"Feeling" (featuring Sonny Wilson)	2023	—	—	—	—	—	—	—	—	—	—		360 Yellow
"Mirror Mirror" (with Steve Aoki and Jem Cooke)	2023	—	—	—	—	—	—	—	—	—	—		360 Yellow and Hiroquest 2: Double Helix
"Holland" (with Earl St. Clair)	2023	—	—	—	—	—	—	—	—	—	—		360 Yellow
"Snow" (with DJ Tom-X)	2023	—	—	—	—	—	—	—	—	—	—		360 Yellow
"Let Me Think About It Again" (with Ida Corr)	2023	—	—	—	—	—	—	—	—	—	—		360 Yellow
"Take My Heart Away" (with SMACK and Sam Gray)	2023	—	—	—	—	—	—	—	—	—	—		360 Yellow
"Friends" (with Bassjackers)	2023	—	—	—	—	—	—	—	—	—	—		360 Yellow
"Lose Your Mind" (with ANG and .EXA)	2023	—	—	—	—	—	—	—	—	—	—		360 Yellow
"Simulation"	2023	—	—	—	—	—	—	—	—	—	—		360 Yellow
"Dear Hardstyle" (with Earl St. Clair)	2023	—	—	—	—	—	—	—	—	—	—		360 Blue
"Legends" (with Sub Zero Project and Doktor)	2023	—	—	—	—	—	—	—	—	—	—		360 Blue
"XTC" (with Wildstylez and Jodapac)	2024	—	—	—	—	—	—	—	—	—	—		360 Blue
"All We Need" (with Zany)	2024	—	—	—	—	—	—	—	—	—	—		360 Blue
"Colours"	2024	—	—	—	—	—	—	—	—	—	—		360 Blue
"Real One"	2024	—	—	—	—	—	—	—	—	—	—		360 Blue
"Grow Up" (with City Fidelia)	2024	—	—	—	—	—	—	—	—	—	—		360 Blue
"Rager" (with Radical Redemption and The 27s)	2024	—	—	—	—	—	—	—	—	—	—		360 Blue
"Spaceman (I Always Wanted You to Go)" (with DJ Isaac)	2024	—	—	—	—	—	—	—	—	—	—		360 Blue
"—" denotes a recording that did not chart or was not released in that territory.

=== Other charted songs ===
List of songs, with selected chart positions, showing year released and album name
Title	Year	Peak chart positions		Album
Title	Year	FRA	GER	Album
"No Money No Love" (with David Guetta featuring Elliphant and Ms. Dynamite)	2014	159	94	Listen

=== Remixes ===
- 2010: System F — "Out Of The Blue 2010" (Showtek Remix)
- 2013: Carly Rae Jepsen — "Tonight I'm Getting Over You" (Showtek Remix)
- 2014: Eva Shaw — "Jungle Space" (Showtek Edit)
- 2015: David Guetta featuring Sam Martin — "Lovers on the Sun" (Showtek Remix)
- 2019: Major Lazer featuring Skip Marley — "Can't Take It From Me" (Showtek Remix)
