= Booyah (song) =

2013 single by Showtek

Single by Showtek featuring We Are Loud and Sonny Wilson
- Released: 19 August 2013; 18 October 2013 (re-release)
- Length: 5:11
- Label: Spinnin'; Polydor
- Songwriters: Sjoerd Janssen; Wouter Janssen; Daniël Ortgiess; Björn van den Biggelaar
- Producers: Showtek; We Are Loud!

Showtek singles chronology
"Get Loose" (2013)	"Booyah" (2013)	"We Like to Party" (2013)

We Are Loud singles chronology
"Under My Control Now" (2012)	"Booyah" (2013)	"Light It Up" (2015)

Sonny Wilson singles chronology
"Got to Give" (2013)	"Booyah" (2013)	"Light It Up" (2015)

"Booyah" is a song by the Dutch record producer duo Showtek featuring co-production by Dutch record producers We Are Loud and vocals by Dutch singer Sonny Wilson. It was released on 19 August 2013, through Spinnin' Records, and re-released on 18 October 2013 in collaboration with Polydor Records. It entered the UK Singles Chart at number five, making it the first Showtek release to chart in the UK, on 27 October 2013. A remix EP featuring Lucky Date and Cash Cash's remixes among others was released on 8 November 2013.

== Music video ==
A music video to accompany the release of "Booyah" was first released onto YouTube on 17 September 2013 at a total length of four minutes and thirteen seconds. The video was taken in Muswell Hill, Crouch End and Finsbury Park, as well as on the London Underground and a London double-decker bus on route W7.

== Sonny Wilson ==
Sonny Wilson is a Dutch singer-songwriter who has influences of reggae and reggae fusion. As well as this song, Wilson has only had one other major collaboration, being featured on David Guetta's "Sun Goes Down". It also features Canadian reggae fusion/pop group MAGIC!, and also has co-production by Showtek, which makes it Wilson's second collaboration with them.

== Track listing ==
Digital download – single
No.	Title	Length
1.	"Booyah"	5:11

Digital download – EP
No.	Title	Length
1.	"Booyah" (Radio Edit)	3:35
2.	"Booyah" (Cash Cash Remix)	5:07
3.	"Booyah" (Brooks Remix)	6:37
4.	"Booyah" (JP Candela & Alexander Som Remix)	6:53

Digital download – remix EP
No.	Title	Length
1.	"Booyah" (Lucky Date Remix)	4:15
2.	"Booyah" (Cash Cash Remix)	5:07
3.	"Booyah" (Brooks Remix)	6:37
4.	"Booyah" (JP Candela & Alexander Som Remix)	6:53

CD single
No.	Title	Length
1.	"Booyah" (radio edit)	3:35
2.	"Booyah"	5:11

== Chart performance ==
=== Weekly charts ===
Chart (2013–2014)	Peak position
Australia (ARIA)	87
Australian Club Tracks (ARIA)	2
Austria (Ö3 Austria Top 40)	50
Belgium (Ultratop 50 Flanders)	23
Belgium (Ultratop 50 Wallonia)	25
Canada Hot 100 (Billboard)	98
Czech Republic Airplay (ČNS IFPI)	12
Denmark (Tracklisten)	32
France (SNEP)	22
Germany (GfK)	56
Hungary (Dance Top 40)	10
Ireland (IRMA)	40
Netherlands (Dutch Top 40)	14
Netherlands (Single Top 100)	15
Japan Hot 100 (Billboard)	50
Poland Dance (ZPAV)	4
Poland (Polish Airplay New)	4
Scotland Singles (Official Charts)	2
Slovakia Airplay (ČNS IFPI)	42
Sweden (Sverigetopplistan)	56
Switzerland (Schweizer Hitparade)	45
UK Singles (Official Charts)	5
UK Dance (Official Charts)	1
US Dance Club Songs (Billboard)	2
US Hot Dance/Electronic Songs (Billboard)	13

=== Year-end charts ===
Chart (2013)	Position
France (SNEP)	129
Hungary (Dance Top 40)	73
Netherlands (Dutch Top 40)	78
Netherlands (Single Top 100)	53
UK Singles (OCC)	132

Chart (2014)	Position
Hungary (Dance Top 40)	46
US Hot Dance/Electronic Songs (Billboard)	58

== Certifications ==
Region	Certification	Certified units/sales
United Kingdom (BPI)	Silver	200,000^{‡}
Streaming
Denmark (IFPI Danmark)	Gold	1,300,000^{†}
^{‡} Sales+streaming figures based on certification alone.^{†} Streaming-only figures based on certification alone.

== Release history ==
Region	Date	Format	Label
Worldwide	19 August 2013	Digital download	Spinnin' Records
Worldwide	18 October 2013	Digital download	Spinnin' Records, Polydor Records

== In popular culture ==
"Booyah" was the 2014–15 Philadelphia Flyers Goal Song. The Cleveland Browns used "Booyah" as their touchdown song for the 2016 season.

Vancouver Canucks forward Jannik Hansen used "Booyah" as his personalized goal song beginning in 2015–16.

The song had been used by the Halifax Thunderbirds during their inaugural 2019–20 NLL season.
