= Jacob van Campen =

Dutch artist and architect (1596–1657)

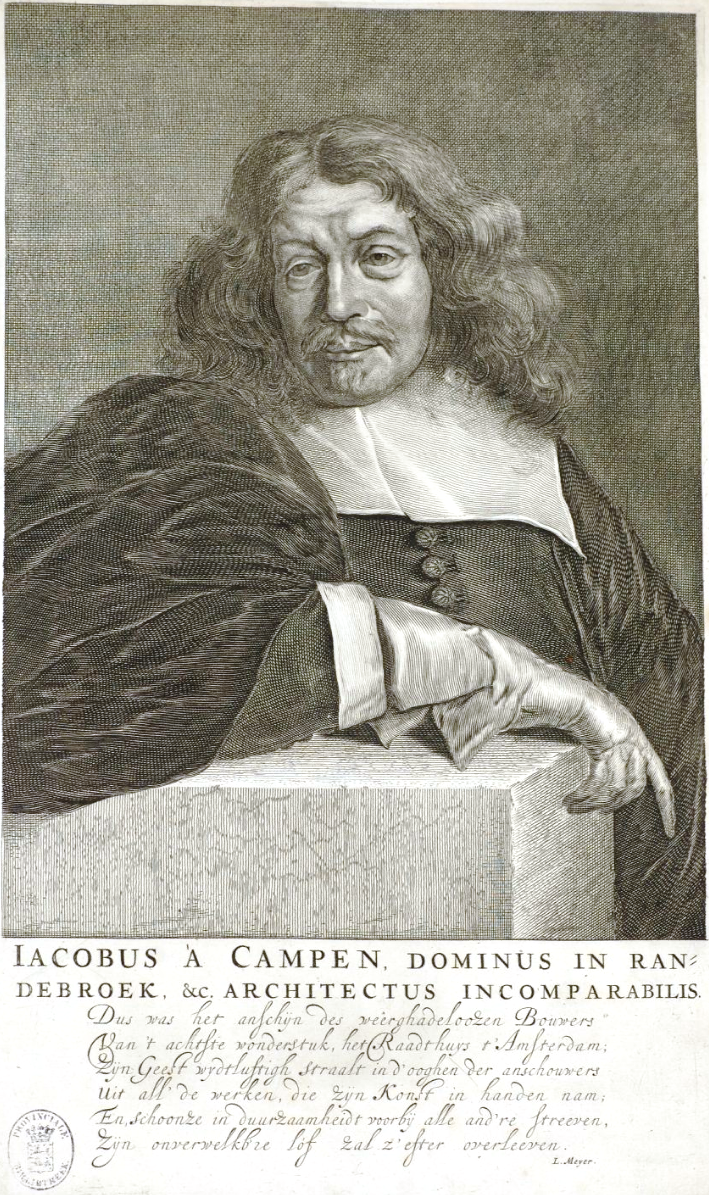
- Jacob van Campen in his book Images of the City Hall of Amsterdam in 30 engravings, 1665.
- Born: 2 February 1596; Haarlem, Holland, Dutch Republic
- Died: 13 September 1657 (aged 61); Amersfoort, Utrecht, Dutch Republic
- Occupation: Architect
- Buildings: Mauritshuis; Huis ten Bosch; Royal Palace

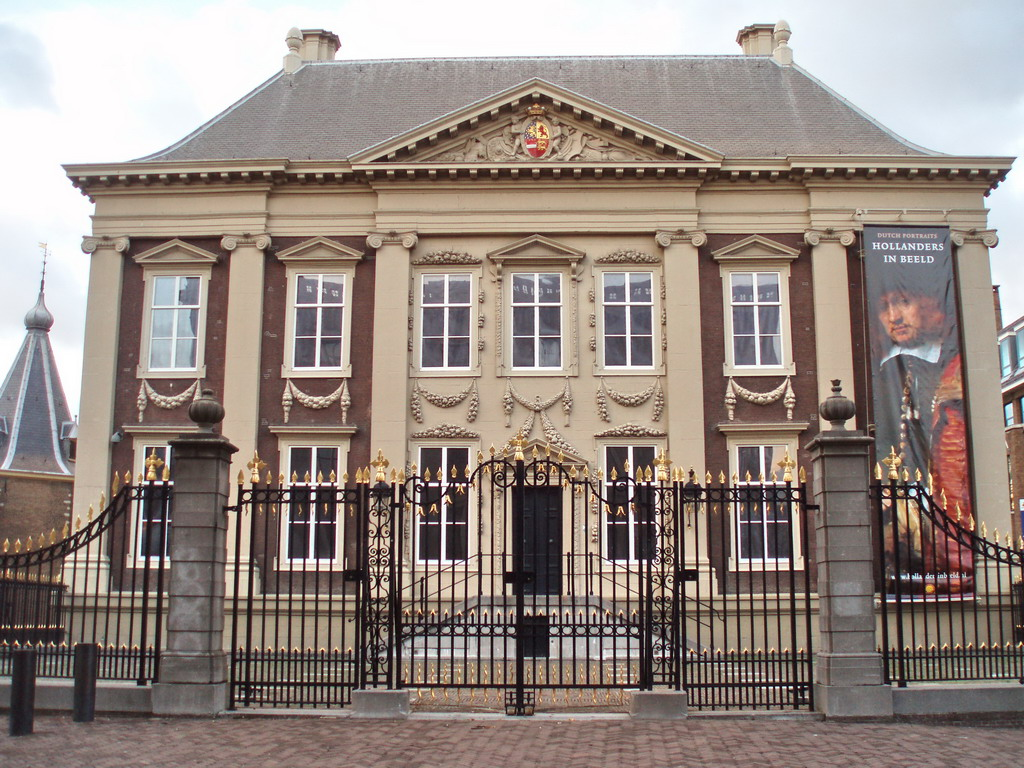
Mauritshuis, The Hague

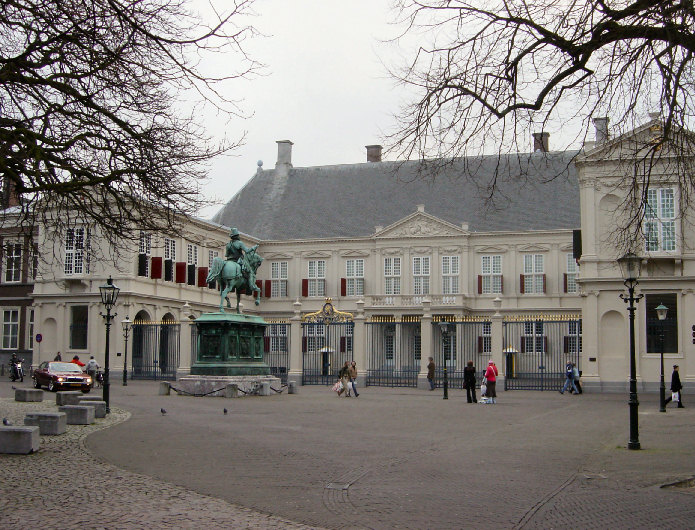
The Paleis Noordeinde, The Hague

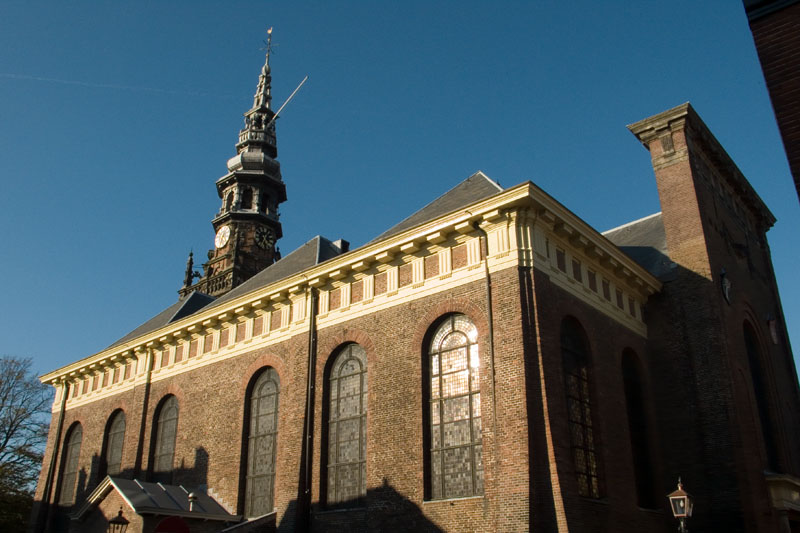
The "Nieuwe Kerk", Haarlem

Jacob van Campen (2 February 1596 — 13 September 1657) was a Dutch artist and architect of the Golden Age.

== Biography ==
He was born into a wealthy family at Haarlem and spent his youth in his hometown. Being of noble birth and with time on his hands, he took up painting mainly as a pastime. In 1614, he became a member of the Guild of Saint Luke (in Haarlem the architects and painters were both in the same guild, and many were both, such as Pieter Saenredam and Salomon de Bray), and he was in an apprenticeship under painter Frans de Grebber — a number of Van Campen's oils survive. About 1616 to 1624 he is thought to have lived in Italy. On his return to the Netherlands, Van Campen turned to architecture, applying ideas borrowed from Andrea Palladio, Vincenzo Scamozzi, and classical influences from Vitruvius. He was primarily responsible for introducing the classical revival style into Dutch Baroque architecture, combining the native, Dutch brick style with the Vitruvian principles he had learnt to produce "Dutch Classicism", an internationally influential style.

Van Campen was friendly with Constantijn Huygens, and together they designed a new house for Huygens. Even after Van Campen's death, his work greatly influenced Johan Maurits van Nassau-Siegen, the designer of the Kleefse gardens (the gardens of Cleve), and Frederick William, Elector of Brandenburg. The latter owned a book by Van Campen regardless of the expense. The city hall and city palace of Potsdam owe a debt to ideas by Van Campen.

Van Campen's first known building was the Coymans house built in 1625 in Amsterdam. In the 1630s, Van Campen and Pieter Post designed the Mauritshuis in The Hague, a palace that is now home to a Royal Picture Gallery, and Van Campen alone designed the Netherlands' first theatre, Amsterdam's Stadsschouwburg. About 1645 Van Campen designed the Nieuwe Kerk in Haarlem, a church that influenced Christopher Wren. His best-known work is probably the large Town Hall of Amsterdam (begun 1648), now the Royal Palace in Dam Square.

Van Campen worked as an architect, a painter and a designer of decorative schemes, like that for the church organ in Alkmaar. His art also influenced sculpture. He was assisted in his work by Pieter Post, Daniël Stalpaert, Matthias Withoos, Philips Vingboons, Artus Quellinus, Tielman van Gameren and Rombout Verhulst. During the building of the city hall, Van Campen lived in very expensive lodgings in the nearby Kalverstraat and he spent freely. In 1654 Van Campen (and Willem de Keyser left after an argument, probably in connection with the design of the barrel vaults. Stalpaert won, but his completion of the project was reported to be less fine than Van Campen's designs.

After a long career, Van Campen died in 1657 in his buitenplaats (residence) Randenbroek near Amersfoort, which he had inherited from his mother, and was buried there. He had expanded it himself and had it decorated by Caesar van Everdingen. Van Campen never married but had one son, Alexander Van Campen.

== Designs ==
Van Campen was selective in what projects he took on. His best known works are:

- The Royal Palace, Amsterdam, former city hall. In 1647, his name is mentioned for the first time in connection with the design of the new city hall. It was to be a perfect building, perfect in its proportions and in the message it conveyed to the spectator. Its power lies in its strict and perfect proportions and extremely moderate decoration. Critics loathed the simple entrance - without stairs - on the ground floor.
- He is suspected to have had a hand in the alteration of the Rembrandthuis at the Jodenbreestraat in Amsterdam (1627), and in the design of the castle Drakensteyn at Baarn
- The Mauritshuis in The Hague (1633).
- the Theatre of Van Campen (1638), based on the example of Teatro Olimpico in Vicenza, in Amsterdam.
- the Paleis Noordeinde, a royal palace in The Hague (1640).

As well as houses and palaces, he also designed a number of churches, such as those at Renswoude and at Hooge Zwaluwe, and the Nieuwe Kerk in Haarlem. Of that design, Pieter Saenredam made no fewer than three paintings and eight engravings. Furthermore, Van Campen designed gates and towers, e.g. for the Westerkerk and Nieuwe Kerk, both in Amsterdam. His paintings and wall decorations (such as those at Paleis Huis ten Bosch), show some similarity with the work of Paulus Bor, one of the founders of a group of painters calling themselves the Bentvueghels.
