= List of Yoo Jae-suk performances =

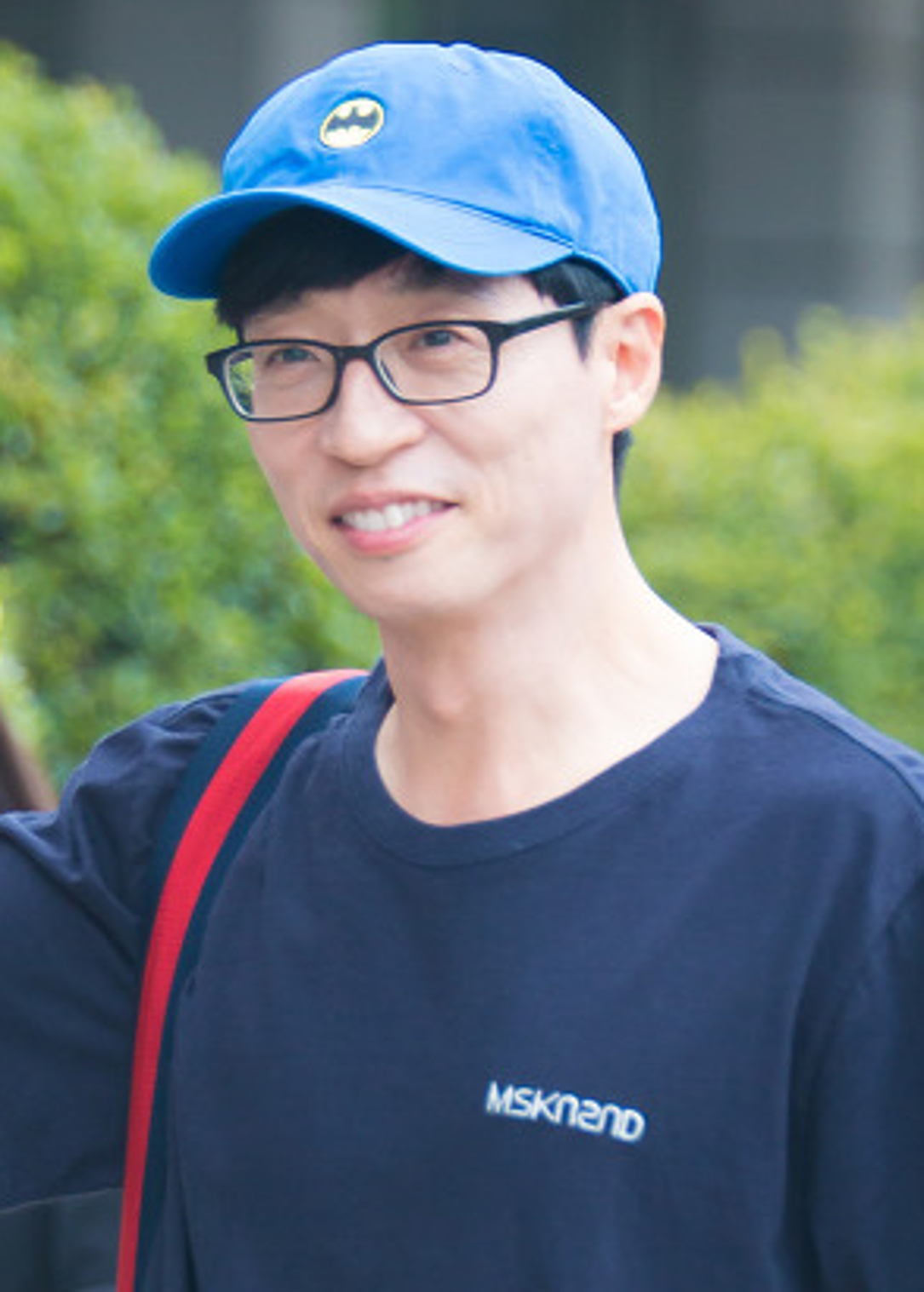
- Yoo Jae-suk in 2017
- Film: 6
- Television series: 9
- Television show: 37
- Music videos: 9

Yoo Jae-suk (Korean: 유재석; born on August 14, 1972), is a South Korean comedian, host and television personality currently signed to Antenna.

== Television host ==
Off-Air On-Air

Year	Title	Ref.
2000–2002	Achievable Saturday - Star Survival Donggeodongrak	
2002	Joyful Super Sunday TV - MC Standby Cue	
2002	Exclamation Mark	
2002–2003	Dangerous Invitation	
2003–2007	X-Man	
2004	Waving the Korean Flag	
2004	Healthy Men and Women	
2004	Yoo Jae-suk and Fullness of the Heart	
2004–2012	Yoo Jae-suk and Kim Won-hee's Come to Play	
2004–2020	Happy Together (Season 1-4)	
2005–2007	Yoo Jae-suk's Truth Game	
2005–2018	Infinite Challenge (Season 1–4)	
2007	Haja Go! (Let's Do It!)	
2007	Old TV	
2007–2008	Mission Impossible	
2008–2010	Family Outing (Season 1)	
2010–present	Running Man	
2014	I Am a Man	
2015–2016	Same Bed, Different Dreams (Season 1)	
2015–2020	Two Yoo Project Sugar Man (Season 1–3)	
2018–2019	Village Survival, the Eight (Season 1, 2)	
2018–2019	Cool Kids	
2018–2021	Busted! (Season 1–3)	
2018–present	You Quiz on the Block (Season 1–3)	
2019	Laborhood on Hire	
2019–present	Hangout with Yoo	
2020–2022	Sixth Sense (Season 1, 2, 3)	
2021	Come Back Home	
2022–2023	The Skip Dating	
2024	Apartment 404	
2024	Synchro U Pilot	
2024–Present	Whenever Possible (Season 1-3)	
2025	Sixth Sense: City Tour	

== Film ==
Year	Title	Role	Notes	Ref.
1989	Young-gu and Daengchili		Cameo	
1994	Tyranno's Toenail			
2007–2008	Kimchi Cheese Smile		Cameo	
2008	Bee Movie	Barry B. Benson (Korean version)		
2009	White Tuft, the Little Beaver	Narrator & Owl (Korean version)		
2020	P1H: The Beginning of a New World	Han	Special appearance	
2024	Pilot	Himself	Special appearance	

== Television series ==
Year	Title	Role	Notes	Ref.
2000 – 2001	Great Friends	Yoo Jae-suk		
2005	Banjun Drama			
2007	Kimchi Cheese Smile	The guests of the wedding	Cameo	
2008	Lee San, Wind of the Palace	Man joking with Mak Sun	Cameo	
2009	Queen of Housewives		Cameo	
2015	A Girl Who Sees Smells		Cameo with Running Man members	
2015	My Daughter, Geum Sa-wol	Genius Painter / Himself / Personal Assistant	Cameo (episode 24)	
2019	Beautiful Love, Wonderful Life	Happy Together MC	Cameo (with Jun Hyun-moo)	
2020	Zombie Detective	zombie movie poster actor	Cameo	
2023	Kokdu: Season of Deity	employee	Cameo (episode 3)	
2023	My Dearest	Farmer	Cameo (episode 12–13, 15)	

== Web shows ==
Year	Title	Role	Notes	Ref.
2021	Clumsy Antenna	Main Cast	with Artist from Antenna	
2022	Korea No. 1	Cast Member	with Lee Kwang-soo and Kim Yeon-koung	
2022–2023	PLAYou	Host	Season 1–2	
2022–2024	The Zone: Survival Mission	Cast Member	Season 1–3	
2022–present	Just an Excuse	Host	YouTube	
2026	Yoo Jae-suk's Camp	Host		

== Music video appearances ==
Year	Song title	Artist
2004	"Cause' You're Pretty" (이쁘니까)	Shinnago
2005	"Look Out the Window"	Kang Ho-dong
2009	"Let's Dance"	Future Liger (with Tiger JK, Tasha)
2012	"Room Nallari" (방구석 날라리)	Sagging Snail (with Lee Juck)
2012	"Gangnam Style" (강남스타일)	Psy
2013	"Gentleman"	Psy
2014	"Beep"	Park Ji-yoon
2015	"Tell Me One More Time"	Jinusean
2016	"Dancing King"	Exo
