= Meltdown (EP) =

Meltdown EP

EP by Pitbull
- Released: November 22, 2013
- Recorded: 2013
- Genre: Dance, hip hop, pop rap
- Length: 16:43
- Label: Mr. 305; Polo Grounds; RCA Records
- Producer: Benny Blanco; Burns; Cirkut; Calvin Harris; Ivar Lisinski; Dr. Luke; Olle Olmås; Nick Seeley; Sermstyle; Stargate; Tuxedo

Pitbull chronology
Unreleased (2010)	Meltdown EP (2013)	Trackhouse (Daytona 500 Edition) (2024)

Singles from Meltdown EP
- 1. "Timber" Released: October 7, 2013

Meltdown EP is an extended play (EP) by American rapper Pitbull, released on November 22, 2013 through Mr. 305, Polo Grounds, and RCA Records.

The EP can be purchased individually, or can be found attached onto the end of the Global Warming album under the 2013 reissue titled Global Warming: Meltdown.

== Singles ==
"Timber" was released as the lead single on October 7, 2013. The track features guest vocals from American singer-songwriter Kesha. The single has peaked at #1 on the US Billboard Hot 100, #1 in the UK, Canada, Austria, Germany, Sweden, Denmark and the Netherlands, #4 in Australia, #6 in Spain, #3 in New Zealand, and at #8 in France. It has further peaked in the top 5 in over 25 countries. The song became a worldwide hit. This marks Pitbull's 2nd global hit. Pitbull performed the song in the AMA's, The X Factor finale, Good Morning America and also in the Jingle Balls. Timber has peaked at number one in more than 16 countries, number 2 in 7 countries, number 3 in four countries, and reached the top 10 in 4 countries and top 20 in 3 countries making it the biggest hit of 2014.

== Commercial performance ==
The EP debuted at number 95 on the US Billboard 200 chart, with first-week sales of 10,000 copies in the United States.

== Track listing ==
Standard edition
No.	Title	Writer(s)	Producer(s)	Length
1.	"Timber" (featuring Kesha)	Armando C. Pérez; Kesha Sebert; Lukasz Gottwald; Priscilla Hamilton; Jamie Sanderson; Breyan Stanley Isaac; Henry Walter; Pebe Sebert; Lee Oskar; Keri Oskar; Greg Errico	Dr. Luke; Cirkut; Sermstyle; Nick Seeley^{[a]}	3:24
2.	"That High" (featuring Kelly Rowland)	Perez; Mikkel S. Eriksen; Tor Hermansen; Benjamin Levin; Shellback; Ester Dean	Stargate; Benny Blanco	3:14
3.	"Do It" (featuring Mayer Hawthorne)	Perez; Jacob Dutton; Andrew Cohen; Omar Tavarez; Samuel Wishkoski	Tuxedo	3:40
4.	"Sun in California" (featuring Mohombi and PLAYB4CK)	Perez; Ivar Lisinski; Mohombi Moupondo; Olle Olmås; Bruno Lopez	Lisinski; Olmås	3:00
5.	"All the Things" (featuring Inna)	Perez; Burns; Calvin Harris; Bebe Black	Burns; Calvin Harris^{[a]}; Sean Combs	3:25
Total length:				16:43

Notes

- ^{^[a]} signifies an additional producer

Sample credits

- "Timber" contains a portion of the composition "San Francisco Bay", written by Lee Oskar, Keri Oskar, and Greg Errico as well as a sample of one of Pitbull's own songs, "11:59" featuring Vein.
- "Do It" contains the original track of "Do It" by Tuxedo, but with Pitbull rapping over the extended instrumental breaks.

== Charts ==
Chart (2013)	Peak position
US Billboard 200	95

== Release history ==
Region	Date	Formats	Label(s)
United States	November 25, 2013	Digital download	Mr. 305, Polo Grounds, RCA
United States	November 25, 2013	CD	Mr. 305, Polo Grounds, RCA
