= Scared to Be Lonely =

2017 single by Martin Garrix and Dua Lipa

Single by Martin Garrix and Dua Lipa
- Written: December 2016
- Released: 27 January 2017
- Recorded: 2016
- Studio: Record Plant (Hollywood); Strings Attached (Collendoorn, the Netherlands)
- Genre: Future bass; electro dance
- Length: 3:40
- Label: Stmpd; Epic
- Songwriters: Giorgio Hesdey Tuinfort; Georgia Ku; Nathaniel Campany; Kyle Shearer; Martin Garrix
- Producers: Martin Garrix; Giorgio Tuinfort; Valley Girl; Lorna Blackwood

Martin Garrix singles chronology
"Make Up Your Mind" (2016)	"Scared to Be Lonely" (2017)	"Byte" (2017)

Dua Lipa singles chronology
"No Lie" (2016)	"Scared to Be Lonely" (2017)	"Lost in Your Light" (2017)

Music video
- "Scared to Be Lonely" on YouTube

"Scared to Be Lonely" is a song recorded by Dutch DJ and record producer Martin Garrix and English singer Dua Lipa. It was written by Dutch songwriter Giorgio Tuinfort, Nathaniel Campany, Kyle Shearer, and Georgia Ku, while the production was handled by Tuinfort, Valley Girl, and Lorna Blackwood. The song was released for digital download and streaming as a standalone single on 27 January 2017 by Stmpd Rcrds and Epic Records, after being premiered by Garrix at the 2017 AVA Festival a month earlier. It was later included on Dua Lipa: Complete Edition (2018), the super deluxe reissue of Lipa's eponymous debut studio album.

"Scared to Be Lonely" is a future bass track with electro and emo-EDM elements. Lyrically, the song sees Lipa singing about the ending of a relationship. The song was met with widespread critical acclaim from music critics, who praised Lipa's vocals and the song's emotive production, while the song also became a commercial success, reaching the top 10 of charts in 12 countries worldwide, including Garrix's native region of the Netherlands, reaching the third position. It additionally reached number 14 and 76, respectively, on the UK Singles Chart and US Billboard Hot 100. The song has since been certified platinum or higher in 15 territories, including diamond in France and Mexico, quadruple platinum awards in Norway and Sweden as well as a triple platinum award in the Netherlands.

The music video for "Scared to Be Lonely" was directed by Blake Claridge and filmed in Scotland. It features Garrix walking around a landscape, reminiscing about past relationships, while Lipa sings in a forest. The two further promoted the song in 2017 with live performances at Capital FM's the Jingle Bell Ball, the Coachella Valley Music and Arts Festival, and on The Tonight Show Starring Jimmy Fallon. Two remix EPs and an acoustic version were released. The EPs include remixes by Brooks, DubVision, and Loud Luxury.

== Background and recording ==
Following the release of a club record in his third extended play Seven (2016), Martin Garrix wanted to return to the more pop-leaning sound of his single "In the Name of Love" (2016) with Bebe Rexha. In order to create a follow-up to the song, Garrix had an A&R meeting with his record label, Stmpd Rcrds and Epic Records, that featured seven new songs with potential. "Scared to Be Lonely" was then crafted as a completely new idea. It was written by Garrix, Giorgio Tuinfort, Nathaniel Campany, Kyle Shearer, and Georgia Ku. The song's production was handled by Garrix, Valley Girl, Tuinfort, and Lorna Blackwood. Engineering was done by Garrix, JP Negrete, and Cameron Gower-Poole, while Frank van Essen contributed the arrangement, violin, and strings. The song was recorded at The Record Plant in Hollywood and Studio Strings Attached in Collendoorn, the Netherlands.

Garrix had a rough demo with a chord progression before going in search of a vocalist, with several artists recording demos before Dua Lipa. She had been on Garrix's wishlist of collaborators, with him reaching out to Lipa's management in hope she would record it. Lipa expressed her admiration of the song and recorded a demo, which she re-recorded after Garrix gave her feedback. After receiving Lipa's final version, Garrix went back into the studio and polished off the song, editing the melodies and incorporating lots of live instrumentation with real strings. Lipa and Garrix had been introduced by mutual connections, but did not meet in person during the recording of the song.

== Music and lyrics ==
"Scared to Be Lonely"
A future bass track with a beat employing trap vibes, "Scared to Be Lonely" builds up to its drop where half-time rhythms with layered synth chords overtop are used.

Musically, "Scared to Be Lonely" is a future bass and electro dance track with elements of electro and emo-EDM. It runs for 3:40, and follows a structure of verse, bridge, chorus, drop, verse, bridge, chorus, drop, middle eight, chorus, drop. The song is set in the time signature of 4/4 time and is composed in the key of C♯ minor, with a tempo of 138 beats per minute and a chord progression of A(add9)—C♯m7/E—B(add4)—G♯m(♭6). It opens with "ghostly" electronic strings and a "charming" piano melody, before synths and sparse percussion items come in. The percussion leads the song towards the simple synth hook. Finger snaps are used in the middle eight.

The song uses an upbeat, pop-ready, future bass, and dance production with an emotive tone. The production also consists of a beat that has trap vibes ever so often, emotive strings, "boisterous" bass notes, and "tantalizing" hi-hats. Each production element builds up to the drop, where the piano melody becomes electronic. Lipa uses soulful vocals that range from B_{3} to G♯_{5}, and she makes use of belting. Lyrically, the song documents the ending of a relationship, with Lipa pondering whether it is legit.

== Release and promotion ==
Garrix premiered "Scared to Be Lonely" at the 2017 AVA Festival in Myanmar on New Year's Eve. The song's artwork leaked on 19 January 2017; it features the two artists standing side by side on a hill, with Garrix looking at Lipa, similarly to the cover art for "In the Name of Love", and a countryside back drop. They formally announced the single on 25 January 2017, revealing a snippet of the song as well as one of its music video. The following day, the song leaked online. It was released for digital download and streaming on 27 January 2017, through Epic Records and Stmpd Rcrds. The song was sent for radio airplay in Italy a week later. "Scared to Be Lonely" was later included as the sixth track on the second disc of the reissue of Lipa's eponymous debut studio album Dua Lipa: Complete Edition, released on 19 October 2018 by Warner Bros Records.

On 22 March 2017, Lipa and Garrix performed "Scared to Be Lonely" on The Tonight Show Starring Jimmy Fallon. Garrix played a guitar while Lipa danced around the stage and sang to Garrix. During his 15 April 2017 set at the Coachella Valley Music and Arts Festival, Garrix brought out Lipa to perform the song. Lipa performed the song for Capital FM's the Jingle Bell Ball on 9 December 2017. The song was included on the setlist of Lipa's Self-Titled Tour (2017–18).

== Reception ==
"Scared to Be Lonely" was met with acclaim from music critics. For The 405, Sean Ward compared it to Lipa's "No Goodbyes" (2017), while labelling the song a "mega-collab," and noting its "dance ecstasy." Sebas E. Alonso of Jenesaispop thought the song is reminiscent of the Chainsmokers as well as the tropical house of Lipa's own "Hotter than Hell" (2016). He went on to put forward the song's potential to be a bonus track on Dua Lipa, as it does not succumb to dembow, dancehall, or trap styles. In a positive review from Dancing Astronaut, Haylee Graham said the song was "well worth the wait" and praised Lipa's "velvet-smooth vocals" that emphasize the "feels." She continued by complimenting the "heart-rending" lyrics and how Garrix has proven he is worthy of his dance music industry vanguard status. In a separate Dancing Astronaut review, Kassi Chrys viewed that the song shows Garrix's "true artistry."

In her review for Time, Raisa Bruner named "Scared to Be Lonely" a "thoughtful ballad" that converts into a "slow-burning banger," while also praising the space given for Lipa's vocals to "shine." Billboard's David Rishty and Kat Bein ranked it as Garrix's third best song, behind "In The Name of Love" and "Animals" (2013). The two of them saw the strength in the song's subtlety and commended Lipa's "beautiful" vocals. They also praised Garrix's production, calling the drop "warm" and the beat "steady." David Renshaw of The Fader labelled the song a "dramatic EDM banger," while Idolator's Robbie Daw described it as a "slow-paced EDM track" and commended the "pretty stellar" middle eight. "Scared to Be Lonely" was nominated for Single of the Year at the 2017 Electronic Music Awards and won Best Bass Track at the 2018 WDM Radio Awards.

== Commercial performance ==
"Scared to Be Lonely" debuted at number five on the Netherlands' Dutch Single Top 100 chart dated 4 February 2017. Two weeks later, it rose to a peak of number three, spending two weeks at the peak and 32 weeks on the chart. On the Dutch Top 40, the song spent 21 weeks on the chart, debuting at number 29 and attaining a peak position of number 2 in its sixth week. The song reached the summit of the Dutch Dance Top 30 chart, and lasted a total of 74 weeks on it. In September 2018, the song was awarded a triple platinum certification by the Nederlandse Vereniging van Producenten en Importeurs van beeld – en geluidsdragers (NVPI) for track-equivalent sales of 120,000 units in the Netherlands.

On the UK Singles Chart, "Scared to Be Lonely" debuted at number 23 on the issue dated 3 February 2017. The following week, it rose to a peak of number 14 on the chart, spending two weeks at the position. In both weeks that the song was at its peak, Lipa had three songs in the top 15 of the UK Singles Chart with "Be the One" (2015) and "No Lie" (2016) by Sean Paul featuring Lipa. "Scared to be Lonely" spent a total of 22 weeks on the chart. The song also entered the UK Dance Singles Chart, where it peaked at number two. For track-equivalent sales of 600,000 units in the United Kingdom, the song was awarded a double platinum certification by the British Phonographic Industry (BPI) in August 2021.

In the United States, "Scared to Be Lonely" debuted at number 88 on the Billboard Hot 100 chart issue dated 18 February 2017. It spent 14 non-consecutive weeks on the chart, and eventually peaked at number 76. In December 2020, the Recording Industry Association of America (RIAA) awarded the song a double platinum certification for selling 2,000,000 track-equivalent units in the US. "Scared to Be Lonely" further reached the top 10 of charts in Austria, Belgium (Flanders), the Czech Republic, Denmark, Finland, Germany, Hungary, Malaysia, New Zealand, Norway, Portugal, Scotland, Slovakia, Sweden, and Switzerland. The song has been certified diamond in France and Mexico, quadruple platinum in Norway and Sweden, respectively, triple platinum in Poland, and triple platinum in Australia, Canada, and Italy, respectively.

== Music videos ==
Garrix wanders a landscape while Lipa sings in a forest in the music video

The music video for "Scared to Be Lonely" was directed by Blake Claridge and released alongside the song. After receiving notice of the music video, the service production company LS Productions went in search of an expansive landscape with Scandinavian-looking wood and a house. The company sourced several potential locations around Scotland, eventually choosing a Category B-listed 19th-century building in Dumfries and Galloway. The music video production team enlisted the help of Flying Pictures to shoot the video with drones. Two drone teams were used, one to supply a bright light on Garrix that emphasizes his character's loneliness, and one to actually film the video with an Alexa camera.

The video was filmed over the course of two days, and includes non-actor cast members. The meaning behind it comes from the moments in which a partner contemplates staying in a relationship or leaving. The video features Garrix wandering around the landscape while reminiscing about past relationships. The past and present are distinguished between aspect ratios, with the past containing scenes of Garrix accompanied by partners in a bedroom, a steamy shower, and a car. While all this is happening, Lipa sings in a dark forest with a bright light behind her. The visual closes with Garrix looking at the floor in a house, before someone touches his shoulder and he turns around. A Jake Jelicich-directed music video for the song's acoustic version was released on 7 April 2017. It features a live performance of Garrix and Lipa in a studio with lens flares and film grain.

== Remixes ==
"Scared to Be Lonely" has been accompanied by several remixes. Two remix EPs were released, one on 17 March 2017 and the other a week later. Brooks' future house remix has simple verses that contain just a powerful atmosphere and Lipa's vocals, while the funky synths and festival melodies encapsulate the choruses that drop heavily. On their remix, DubVision created a progressive house track that has a big build and bouncy drop. The Zonderling remix adds groovy elements with heavy synths. Alpharock's remix is a drum and bass track with beats of the same genre, and an increased tempo. The tech house remix by Funkin Matt introduces "catchy" bass stabs and subtle melodies. Julien Earle's remix was described as an "emotional" house rendition.

Gigamesh's remix was noted for its solid atmospheres. Medasin chills down the song to create a future bass remix with euphoric elements. His production uses big saw chords, ambient pads, and plucks with soft attack and drum patterns, while also introducing new melodies for the drop. Loud Luxury's remix fuses deep house, tech house, and future house elements. Conro's future bass remix has a clean production with cascading synths that glide over Lipa's vocals. The LOOPERS remix makes use of funky 8-bit sounds. On his remix, Joe Mason featured drums and guitars, as well as incorporating lush synths. He additionally re-pitched Lipa's vocals and created an entirely new drop.

An acoustic version of the song was released on 6 April 2020. It features an orchestra, strings, and percussive instruments, while Garrix plays the song's melody on an electric guitar. Lipa had wanted to do an acoustic version for a while, and her vocals are the forefront. The staff of Dancing Astronaut thought that the track shows Garrix's "true versatility" and "artistic abilities," while Myles Tanzer of The Fader commended the "gorgeous" string section.

== Track listings ==
- Digital download and streaming
1. "Scared to Be Lonely" – 3:40
- Digital EP – remixes, volume 1
1. "Scared to Be Lonely" (Brooks remix) – 3:20
2. "Scared to Be Lonely" (DubVision remix) – 3:10
3. "Scared to Be Lonely" (Zonderling remix) – 3:54
4. "Scared to Be Lonely" (Alpharock remix) – 3:55
5. "Scared to Be Lonely" (Funkin Matt remix) – 3:38
6. "Scared to Be Lonely" (Julien Earle remix) – 5:20
- Digital download and streaming – Brooks extended remix
1. "Scared to Be Lonely" (Brooks extended remix) – 4:35
- Digital download and streaming – DubVision extended remix
1. "Scared to Be Lonely" (DubVision extended remix) – 4:39

- Digital download and streaming – Zonderling extended remix
1. "Scared to Be Lonely" (Zonderling extended remix) – 4:50
- Digital EP – remixes, volume 2
1. "Scared to Be Lonely" (Gigamesh remix) – 3:49
2. "Scared to Be Lonely" (Medasin remix) – 3:32
3. "Scared to Be Lonely" (Loud Luxury remix) – 3:27
4. "Scared to Be Lonely" (Conro remix) – 3:22
5. "Scared to Be Lonely" (LOOPERS remix) – 4:11
6. "Scared to Be Lonely" (Joe Mason remix) – 3:27
- Digital download and streaming – Loud Luxury extended remix
1. "Scared to Be Lonely" (Loud Luxury extended remix) – 3:57
- Digital download and streaming – acoustic version
1. "Scared to Be Lonely" (acoustic version) – 4:17

== Personnel ==
Credits were adapted from Apple Music and YouTube.

Musicians

- Martin Garrix – producer, songwriter
- Dua Lipa – vocals
- Frank van Essen – violin, arranger
- Rami Dawod – programming
- Giorgio Tuinfort – mezzo-soprano, songwriter, producer
- Kyle Shearer – songwriter
- Overton Georgia – songwriter
- Nate Company – songwriter
- Valley Girl – producer
- Lorna Blackwood – producer

Technicals

- Martin Garrix – engineer
- JP Negrete – engineer
- Cameron Poole – engineer

Music video

- Blake Claridge – director, writer
- Sergio Lopez – executive producer
- Craft London – producer
- Lois Newcombe – producer
- Phil Conway – editor
- Damian Karsznia – additional editor
- McCann London – actor
- Jaclyn Kaminski – actress

== Charts ==
=== Weekly charts ===
Weekly chart performance for "Scared to Be Lonely"
Chart (2017)	Peak position
Australia (ARIA)	14
Austria (Ö3 Austria Top 40)	10
Belgium (Ultratop 50 Flanders)	10
Belgium (Ultratop 50 Wallonia)	26
Canada Hot 100 (Billboard)	32
Czech Republic Airplay (ČNS IFPI)	16
Czech Republic Singles Digital (ČNS IFPI)	5
Denmark (Tracklisten)	8
Euro Digital Song Sales (Billboard)	14
Finland (Suomen virallinen lista)	5
France (SNEP)	32
Germany (GfK)	9
Hungary (Rádiós Top 40)	22
Hungary (Single Top 40)	8
Ireland (IRMA)	12
Italy (FIMI)	21
Lebanon (Lebanese Top 20)	11
Malaysia (RIM)	5
Mexico (Billboard Mexican Airplay)	16
Netherlands (Dutch Top 40)	2
Netherlands (Single Top 100)	3
Netherlands (Dutch Dance Top 30)	1
New Zealand (Recorded Music NZ)	8
Norway (VG-lista)	2
Paraguay (Monitor Latino)	14
Portugal (AFP)	9
Romania (Airplay 100)	16
Scottish Singles Sales (Official Charts)	10
Slovakia Airplay (ČNS IFPI)	22
Slovakia Singles Digital (ČNS IFPI)	5
Spain (Promusicae)	21
Sweden (Sverigetopplistan)	3
Switzerland (Schweizer Hitparade)	10
UK Singles (Official Charts)	14
UK Dance (Official Charts)	2
US Billboard Hot 100	76
US Hot Dance/Electronic Songs (Billboard)	9
US Pop Airplay (Billboard)	21

=== Year-end charts ===
2017 year-end chart performance for "Scared to Be Lonely"
Chart (2017)	Position
Australia (ARIA)	48
Austria (Ö3 Austria Top 40)	56
Belgium (Ultratop Flanders)	46
Belgium (Ultratop Wallonia)	89
Brazil (Pro-Música Brasil)	145
Canada (Canadian Hot 100)	92
Denmark (Tracklisten)	49
France (SNEP)	91
Germany (Official German Charts)	52
Hungary (Rádiós Top 40)	53
Hungary (Single Top 40)	70
Hungary (Stream Top 40)	22
Italy (FIMI)	75
Latvia Airplay (LaIPA)	62
Netherlands (Dutch Top 40)	13
Netherlands (Single Top 100)	10
New Zealand (Recorded Music NZ)	44
Norway (VG-lista)	9
Portugal (AFP)	24
Spain (PROMUSICAE)	68
Sweden (Sverigetopplistan)	14
Switzerland (Schweizer Hitparade)	39
UK Singles (OCC)	42
US Hot Dance/Electronic Songs (Billboard)	17

== Certifications ==
Certifications and sales for "Scared to Be Lonely"
Region	Certification	Certified units/sales
Australia (ARIA)	3× Platinum	210,000^{‡}
Belgium (BRMA)	Platinum	20,000^{‡}
Brazil (Pro-Música Brasil)	Diamond	250,000^{‡}
Canada (Music Canada)	2× Platinum	160,000^{‡}
Denmark (IFPI Danmark)	2× Platinum	180,000^{‡}
France (SNEP)	Diamond	333,333^{‡}
Germany (BVMI)	3× Gold	600,000^{‡}
Ireland	—	60,400 (Note: Ireland sales figures for "Scared to Be Lonely" as of November 2018)
Italy (FIMI)	2× Platinum	100,000^{‡}
Mexico (AMPROFON)	2× Diamond+Gold	630,000^{‡}
Netherlands (NVPI)	3× Platinum	120,000^{‡}
New Zealand (RMNZ)	4× Platinum	120,000^{‡}
Norway (IFPI Norway)	4× Platinum	240,000^{‡}
Poland (ZPAV)	3× Platinum	60,000^{‡}
Portugal (AFP)	2× Platinum	20,000^{‡}
Spain (Promusicae)	2× Platinum	120,000^{‡}
Sweden (GLF)	4× Platinum	160,000^{‡}
Switzerland (IFPI Switzerland)	Gold	10,000^{‡}
United Kingdom (BPI)	2× Platinum	1,200,000^{‡}
United States (RIAA)	2× Platinum	2,000,000^{‡}
^{‡} Sales+streaming figures based on certification alone.

== Release history ==
Release dates and formats for "Scared to Be Lonely"
Region	Date	Format(s)	Version	Label(s)	Ref.
Various	27 January 2017	Digital download; streaming	Original	Stmpd; Epic	
Italy	3 March 2017	Radio airplay	Original	Sony	
Various	17 March 2017	Digital download; streaming	Remixes, Vol. 1	Stmpd; Epic	
Various	17 March 2017	Digital download; streaming	Brooks extended remix	Stmpd; Epic	
Various	17 March 2017	Digital download; streaming	DubVision extended remix	Stmpd; Epic	
Various	17 March 2017	Digital download; streaming	Zonderling extended remix	Stmpd; Epic	
Various	24 March 2017	Digital download; streaming	Remixes, Vol. 2	Stmpd; Epic	
Various	24 March 2017	Digital download; streaming	Loud Luxury extended remix	Stmpd; Epic	
Various	6 April 2017	Digital download; streaming	Acoustic	Stmpd; Epic	

== See also ==
- List of Platinum singles in the United Kingdom awarded since 2000
- List of top 10 singles in 2017 (Germany)
- List of most-streamed songs on Spotify
