= Mad Love the Prequel =

EP by Sean Paul
- Released: 29 June 2018
- Recorded: 2016–2018
- Length: 32:59
- Label: SPJ; Dutty Rock; Island
- Producer: Uche Ben Ebele; Banx & Ranx; Obi Fred Ebele; Da Beat Freakz; Jason Jigzagula Henriques; Jack Patterson; Giorgio Tuinfort; David Guetta; 1st Klase; Julian Bunetta; Teddy Geiger; Jr Blender; Boaz van de Beatz; Diplo; Rymez; Donovan Bennett; Sermstyle; Philip Kembo

Sean Paul chronology
Full Frequency (2014)	Mad Love the Prequel (2018)	Live n Livin (2021)

Singles from Mad Love the Prequel
- 1. "No Lie" Released: 18 November 2016; 2. "Tek Weh Yuh Heart" Released: 18 November 2016; 3. "Body" Released: 28 April 2017; 4. "Mad Love" Released: 16 February 2018; 5. "Tip Pon It" Released: 20 April 2018; 6. "Naked Truth" Released: 5 October 2018

Mad Love the Prequel is the first extended play by Jamaican dancehall musician Sean Paul. It was released by SPJ Productions, Dutty Rock Productions, and Island Records on 29 June 2018. The EP spawned six singles: "No Lie" featuring Dua Lipa, "Tek Weh Yuh Heart" featuring Tory Lanez, "Body" featuring Migos, "Mad Love" with David Guetta featuring Becky G, "Tip Pon It" featuring Major Lazer, and "Naked Truth" featuring Jhené Aiko.

As of December 2023, the EP has sold 337,000 album-equivalent units in the US.

== Track listing ==
Credits adapted from Tidal.

No.	Title	Writer(s)	Producer(s)	Length
1.	"Naked Truth" (featuring Jhené Aiko)	Sean Paul Henriques; Zacharie Raymond; Uche Ben Ebele; Malcolm Olangundoye; Taylor Monet Parks; Priscilla Renea; Yannick Rastogi; Obi Fred Ebele	Uche Ben Ebele; Banx & Ranx; Obi Fred Ebele; Freakz	3:58
2.	"Bad Love" (featuring Ellie Goulding)	Henriques; Raymond; Ben Ebele; Olangundoye; Rastogi; Fred Ebele; Carla Marie Williams; Asia Whiteacre	Ben Ebele; Banx & Ranx; Fred Ebele; Freakz	3:34
3.	"Mad Love" (with David Guetta featuring Becky G)	Sean Paul Henriques; Pierre David Guetta; Emily Warren; Shakira Ripoll; Jack Patterson; Rosina Russell; Giorgio Tuinfort; Ina Wroldsen; Raoul Lionel Chen	David Guetta; Jack Patterson; Jason Jigzagula Henriques; Giorgio Tuinfort; Banx & Ranx; 1st Klase	3:19
4.	"Jump on It"	Henriques; Julian Bunetta; Teddy Geiger; Alexander Izquierdo	Banx & Ranx; Julian Bunetta; Teddy Geiger	3:26
5.	"Tip Pon It" (with Major Lazer)	Henriques; Boaz de Jong; Philip Meckseper; Ashanti Reid; Thomas Wesley Pentz	Diplo; Jr Blender; Boaz van de Beatz	3:41
6.	"Jet Plane Trip" (featuring Stefflon Don)	Henriques; Stephanie Allen; Rodney Hwingwiri	Rymez	4:09
7.	"Body" (featuring Migos)	Henriques; Jamal Rashid; Vincent Berry; Quavious Marshall; Kiari Cephus; Kirshnik Ball; Donovan Bennett; Matthew Keaveny; Joel Augustin	Donovan Bennett	3:26
8.	"Tek Weh Yuh Heart" (featuring Tory Lanez)	Henriques; Bennett; Keaveny; Daystar Peterson; Moses Anthony Davis; Gwendolyn Lorraine Bunn; Ashton Combs; Anthony St. Aubyn Kelly	Bennett	3:45
9.	"No Lie" (featuring Dua Lipa)	Henriques; Warren; Philip Kembo; Jamie Sanderson; Andrew Jackson	Sermstyle; Pip Kembo^{[a]}	3:41
Total length:				32:59

Japanese edition bonus tracks
No.	Title	Length
10.	"No Lie" (featuring Dua Lipa; Sam Feldt Remix)	2:52
11.	"No Lie" (featuring Dua Lipa; Delirious & Alex K Remix)	4:19
12.	"Mad Love" (with David Guetta featuring Becky G; Cheat Codes Remix)	3:11
13.	"Mad Love" (with David Guetta featuring Becky G; Valentino Khan Remix)	3:44
14.	"Jump on It" (Spicy Chocolate Remix)	3:17
Total length:		50:29

Notes

- ^{^[a]} signifies a co-producer

== Personnel ==
Credits adapted from Tidal.

Musicians

- Sean Paul – vocals (all tracks)
- Jhené Aiko – vocals (track 1)
- Malcolm Olangundoye – keyboard (track 1, 2)
- Uche Ben Ebele – keyboard (track 1)
- Obi Fred Ebele – keyboard (track 1), 5-string banjo (track 1)
- Yannick Rastogi – bass guitar (track 1-4), drums (track 1-4), synthesizer (track 1-4), background vocals (track 3)
- Zacharie Raymond – bass guitar (track 1-4), drums (track 1-4), synthesizer (track 1-4), background vocals (track 3)
- Ellie Goulding – vocals (track 2)
- Becky G – vocals (track 3)
- Teddy Geiger – keyboard (track 4)
- Stefflon Don – vocals (track 6)
- Migos – vocals (track 7)
- Donovan Bennett – keyboard (track 7)
- Matthew Keaveny – keyboard (track 7)
- Tory Lanez – vocals (track 8)
- Dua Lipa – vocals (track 9)

Technical

- Chris Athens – master engineering (track 1-7)
- Gary Bannister – engineering (track 1, 2)
- Zacharie Raymond – engineering (track 1, 2, 4), programming (track 1-4)
- Yannick Rastogi – engineering (track 1, 2, 4), programming (track 1-4)
- Bill Zimmerman – mixing assistance (track 1, 4, 6)
- Phil Tan – mixing (track 1, 6)
- Uche Ben Ebele – programming (track 1, 2)
- Obi Fred Ebele – programming (track 1, 2)
- John Hanes – mix engineering (track 2)
- Serban Ghenea – mixing (track 2, 3)
- Joe Kearns – vocal production
- Jeff Gunnell – engineering (track 4)
- Connor Mason – engineering (track 4)
- Julian Bunetta – engineering (track 4), programming (track 4)
- Teddy Geiger – programming (track 4)
- James F Reynolds – mixing (track 5)
- Jr Blender – programming (track 5)
- Boaz van de Beatz – programming (track 5)
- Diplo – programming (track 5)
- Rymez – programming (track 6)
- Donovan Bennett – mixing (track 7, 8), programming (track 7)
- Matthew Keaveny – programming (track 7), master engineering (track 8)
- Joel Augustin – programming (track 7)
- Barry Grint – master engineering (track 9)
- Paul Bailey – engineering (track 9)
- James Royo – mixing (track 9)

== Charts ==
Chart (2018)	Peak position
Canadian Albums (Billboard)	79
Finnish Albums (Suomen virallinen lista)	15
French Albums (SNEP)	135
Norwegian Albums (VG-lista)	32
UK R&B Albums (OCC)	31
US Reggae Albums (Billboard)	4

== Certifications ==
Region	Certification	Certified units/sales
Poland (ZPAV)	Platinum	20,000^{‡}
^{‡} Sales+streaming figures based on certification alone.

== Release history ==
Region	Date	Format	Label	Ref.
Various	29 June 2018	Digital download; streaming	SJP; Island	
Various	27 July 2018	CD	SJP; Island	
Japan	24 October 2018	CD	Universal Music Japan; Island	
