= Raffaella Modugno =

Italian model (born 1988)

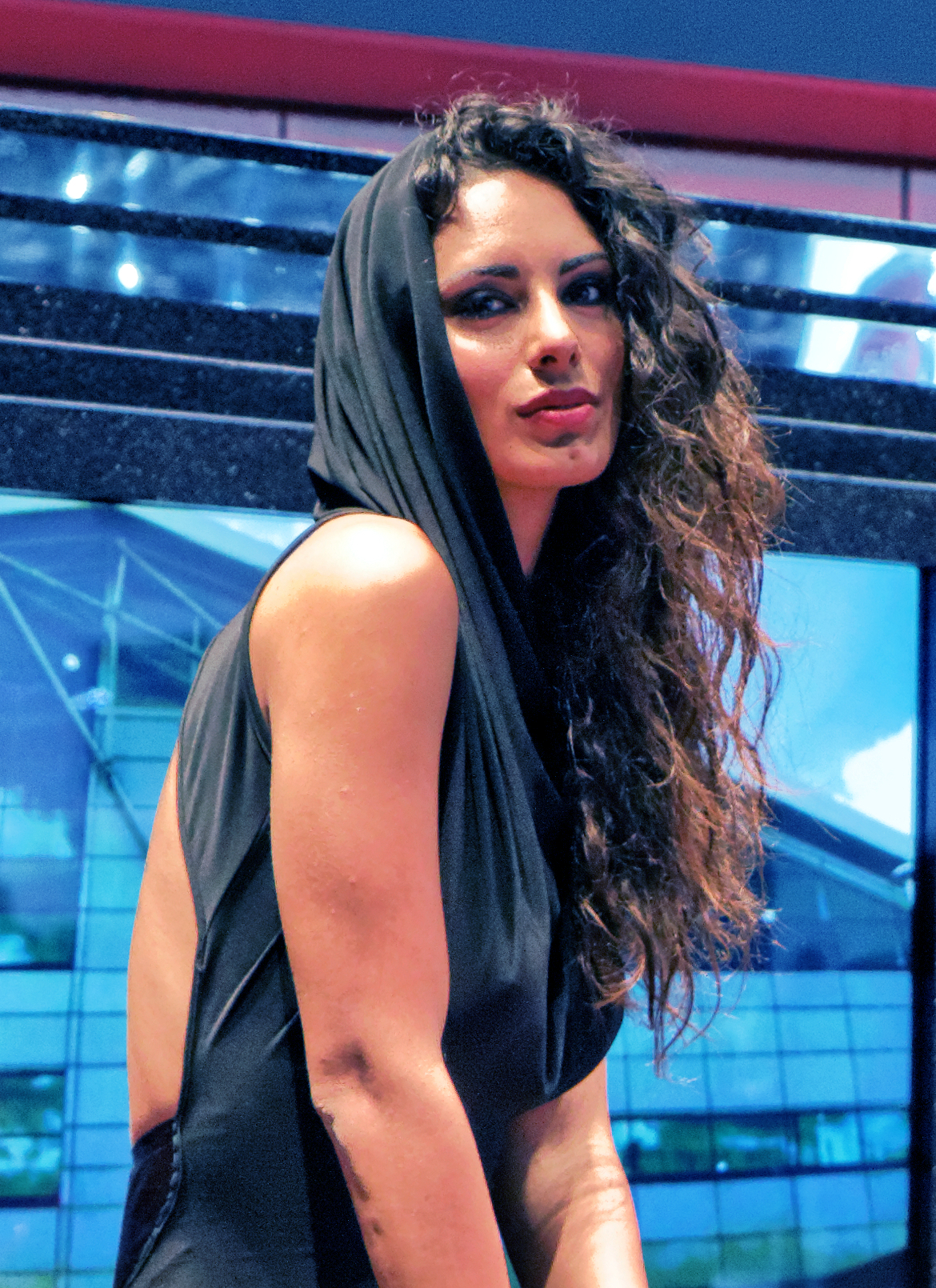
- Raffaella Modugno at 2012 Mondial de l'Automobile de Paris
- Born: Raffaella Modugno; 3 March 1988 (age 37); Ariano Irpino, Province of Avellino, Italy
- Occupation: Model
- Height: 1.81 m (5 ft 11 1/2 in)
- Beauty pageant titleholder
- Title: Miss Curvy Italia 2011 (winner)
- Hair color: Brown
- Eye color: Brown

Raffaella Modugno is an Italian model who was crowned Miss Curve d'Italia Lazio 2011 ("Miss Curvy Lazio 2011"). She was the cover model of the German Maxim (2012) and Indian GQ (2013), and modeled for brands such as Dolce & Gabbana, Roberto Coin and Prada. In the end of 2013 she played a main role in the video for the song "Timber" by Pitbull.

In 2011 and 2012, she appeared in two Italian TV series: Qualunquemente and Teresa Manganiello, respectively. In 2014 she was named among the "25 Most Beautiful Women in the world" by the Italian webmagazine "BE! Magazine".

== Early life ==
Modugno was born on 3 March 1988 in Ariano Irpino, Province of Avellino, Italy, to Joseph and Julia Modugno. She has a twin sister, Rosanna, and a brother, Vincent. As a teenager she was a basketball player, sport which she dedicated professionally 13 years of her life.

At age 12, she started watching the Miss Italia contest with major interest.

== Career ==
=== Pageantry ===
Raffaella Modugno started her career in beauty pageantry in 2007, when she competed for the first time in the Miss Italia contest. In the finals she was classified among the top 15 semifinalists. In between this and the next contest she would participate, she kept modeling for several brands.

In August 2011 she went for the Miss Curve d’Italia Elena Mirò Lazio 2011 (Miss Curvy Italy) and won it. The contest, promoted by the organization of Miss Italia, is intended for curvier candidates. Later in the same month she was again a candidate for the pageant Miss Italia 2011, but, even though she was one of the favourites to the crown, she was banned from the competition by the judicial department of the contest due to some sensual photos in lingerie she had taken while modeling. Against her, the Article 8 of the competition guidelines: «Nude poses and semi-nudity with strong emphasis on the provocative element.» Following the decision, a press release from the organization was made public and it stated:

«Raffaella Modugno, Miss Curve d’Italia Elena Mirò Lazio 2011, was excluded from the Miss Italia 2011 contest due to some photos published on the internet. The legal department of Miss Italia and its director Patrizia Mirigliani have taken this decision after having examined—following numerous indications—photo shootings on the network showing ‘poses of nudity and others of semi-nudity with strong emphasis on the provocative element’.»

Besides her, two other contestants—Alice Bellotto and Tiziana Piergianni—were also eliminated for the same reasons.

=== Modeling ===
Being banned from Miss Italia gave Modugno even more notoriety and a boost to her career. In July 2012 she appeared on the cover of German Maxim, and her Mediterranean beauty and curvy body ended putting her later in the same year to pose for a series of photo shootings for a Riello company calendar in Nosy Be island, Madagascar. Besides it, she kept modeling for many fashion brands and campaigns, such as Roberto Coin, Bruno Caruso, Dolce & Gabbana, Prada, Tom Ford and Christian Louboutin. In December 2013 she posed for GQ Magazine (India issue).

At the end of 2013, she performed the main character as a femme fatale in the music video for the song "Timber" by Pitbull, featuring Kesha. Early in the same year she had played a key role in the video Sigame, by DJ Ju-Lio (feat. Manitú).

== Personal life ==
In 2012, the international media publicised she was dating Diego Forlán, then a soccer player in Inter Milan, but in 2013 they reportedly had given an end to the short relationship.

In December 2012 when asked about her opinion on actress Mila Kunis' dismissal from Dior due to her weight gain she stated:

«I think it’s a futile reason, but evidently it’s weight enough for Dior as for many other brands, and this ends to conduct many models to anorexia. (…) This slenderness demanded for catwalk doesn’t correspond to the body of the Italian woman. We’re talking about size 36/38, which a 5’9’’ tall girl (minimum required for haute couture) hardly handles. (…) When I started modeling I didn’t have an identity, and I don’t deny having encountered obstacles for my career given my curvy body. But with time and experience I entered a market (size 44) which is more diverse to that seen in the catwalk, which shows the interest of many brands for curvy women.»

After participating in some film productions she stated she is currently investing in studying drama to impulse her career as actress.

In 2017, Modugno started dating singer Marc Anthony. Two years later—in December 2019—it was reported she was single again, whereas Anthony was dating model Jessica Lynne Harris.

== Filmography ==
Television
Year	Title	Role	Notes	Country
2012	Teresa Manganiello	Ragazza al bar	Participation	Italy
2011	Qualunquemente	Etica	Television debut	Italy
