= Timber (Pitbull song) =

2013 single by Pitbull featuring Kesha

Single by Pitbull featuring Kesha

from the EP Meltdown
- Released: October 7, 2013
- Recorded: 2013
- Studio: Tokyo, Japan; APG Studios (Hollywood, CA); Conway Recording Studios (Hollywood, CA); Luke's in the Boo (Malibu, CA); Jungle City Studios (New York City, NY); Blackbird Recording Studios (Nashville, TN)
- Genre: Dance-pop; EDM; folktronica
- Length: 3:24
- Label: Polo Grounds; RCA; Mr. 305
- Composers: Kesha Sebert; Lukasz Gottwald; Aaron Davis Arnold; Jamie Sanderson; Henry Walter; Pebe Sebert; Lee Oskar; Keri Oskar; Greg Errico; Steve Arrington; Charles Carter; Waung Hankerson; Roger Parker
- Lyricists: Priscilla Hamilton; Breyan Isaac; Armando C. Pérez
- Producers: Dr. Luke; Cirkut; Sermstyle

Pitbull singles chronology
"FCK" (2013)	"Timber" (2013)	"I'm a Freak" (2014)

Kesha singles chronology
"Crazy Kids" (2013)	"Timber" (2013)	"True Colors" (2016)

Music video
- "Timber" on YouTube

"Timber" is a song by American rapper Pitbull featuring American singer Kesha. The song was released on October 7, 2013, as the lead single from Pitbull's extended play (EP) Meltdown. The song was produced by Dr. Luke, Cirkut, and Sermstyle, with additional production by Nick Seeley. The song interpolates Lee Oskar's 1978 single "San Francisco Bay" and features harmonica player Paul Harrington, who plays through the entire song and was told to emulate Oskar.

The song was the 90th-most popular song of the decade according to Billboard. It peaked at number one on the US Billboard Hot 100 for three consecutive weeks. It also topped the charts in over fifteen additional countries. According to the IFPI, the song sold 9.6 million units worldwide in 2014, including single-track downloads and track-equivalent streams, becoming the sixth best-selling song of that year. It is currently certified fifteen-times Platinum in Norway, twelve-times Platinum in the US, diamond in Germany, seven-times Platinum in Australia and Canada, and Gold or higher in fourteen additional countries.

== Background and composition ==
Kesha had previously featured Pitbull on remixes of her songs "Tik Tok" and "Crazy Kids", and Pitbull featured Kesha on a 2009 song, "Girls". In an interview in December 2013, Pitbull said that Rihanna was originally meant to be the featured artist on "Timber", but she had already been asked to be the featured artist on Shakira's "Can't Remember to Forget You" and did not have time to record "Timber".

"Timber" is a dance-pop, EDM and folktronica song with elements of country. According to the sheet music published at Musicnotes.com by Kobalt Music Publishing, the song is set in common time with a moderately fast tempo of 130 beats per minute. The song is written in the key of G♯ minor and follows a chord sequence of G♯m–B–F♯–E. Kesha's vocals span from G♯_{3} to D♯_{5}.

Paul Harrington, who plays the harmonica throughout the track, was initially given a flat fee of $1,000 for his services. Three years later, however, after consulting an expert on music law, Harrington was paid a further $50,000.

== Commercial performance ==
"Timber" made its first chart appearance on October 10, 2013, in the Republic of Ireland, where it debuted at number 67 on the Irish Singles Chart. The following week, the song climbed to number 19. In Austria, "Timber" debuted at number 69 on the Austrian Singles Chart on October 18, 2013, and eventually crowned the chart at number one. In Germany, the song debuted at number 90 on October 18, 2013, on the German Singles Chart and later peaked at number one.

Timber debuted at number 49 on the US Billboard Hot 100 on October 26, 2013. On January 18, 2014, the single reached number one on the chart, giving Kesha her third number-one single and her tenth top ten hit, as well as earning Pitbull his second number-one single and ninth top ten hit. Before topping the Hot 100, it had been stuck at number two for four weeks, behind "The Monster" by Eminem featuring Rihanna. It also peaked at number one on the US Digital Songs chart, selling 442,000 copies in its peak week, constituting the fourth largest single week sum of 2013. It is also Pitbull's first song to do so. "Timber" also peaked at number one on the US Hot Rap Songs chart. It was the first number one single of 2014 in the US, and stayed at number one for three consecutive weeks. In May 2014, the single reached its 4 million sales mark. As of March 2016, the single has sold 4.7 million copies in the US. As of 2025, the song has since been certified 12× Platinum by the Recording Industry Association of America (RIAA) for combined sales and streaming equivalent units of 12 million in the United States.

In Canada, the song debuted at number seventeen on the Canadian Hot 100 as the week's highest debut and climbed steadily to number one, where it stood for eight consecutive weeks.

In the United Kingdom, "Timber" debuted at the top of the UK Singles Chart on January 5, 2014 ― for the week ending date January 11, 2014 ― shifting 139,000 copies in its first week. This gave both artists their third chart-topping songs in Britain. By the end of 2014, the song had sold 744,000 copies in the UK.

In South Korea, "Timber" debuted at number 16 on Gaon International Chart, but it debuted at number 13 on Gaon Download International Chart with 6,522 downloads. In its second week it reached number two on the International Chart. On the download chart, it jumped to number three, selling another 15,276 copies. "Timber" sold 68,321 copies during 2013 in South Korea. During January 2014, the single sold another 16,515 copies, and during February sold 15,482 digital units. During March 2014, another 13,975 units were sold in South Korea. According to the IFPI, the song sold 9.6 million units worldwide in 2014, including single-track downloads and track-equivalent streams, becoming the sixth best-selling song of that year.

== Music video ==
Kesha filmed her scenes on November 5, 2013, while Pitbull filmed his scenes one week later on November 12, 2013. The video also features a cameo by Italian model Raffaella Modugno and The Bloody Jug Band, an Orlando-based Americana Group, who perform on stage as the bar's house band. The beach scenes were filmed in Exuma islands, Bahamas.

The music video has over 1.5 billion views on YouTube as of September 2024, making it Pitbull's most viewed video as a lead artist.

== Controversies ==
On June 25, 2014, it was reported that songwriters Lee Oskar, Keri Oskar, and Greg Errico had filed a copyright infringement lawsuit against the makers of "Timber", which features a harmonica melody that Oskar claims is "identical" to the melody used in his 1978 song "San Francisco Bay". The songwriters were seeking $3 million USD in damages.

The lawsuit alleged that while Sony Music may have obtained permission to use the sample, which is credited in the album notes for Meltdown, from a license holder, the label failed to obtain permission from the songwriters themselves.

== Track listing ==
- Digital download
1. "Timber" (featuring Kesha) – 3:24
- CD single
1. "Timber" (featuring Kesha) – 3:24
2. "Outta Nowhere" (featuring Danny Mercer) – 3:26

== Credits and personnel ==
Recording

- Engineered in Tokyo, Japan, and at APG Studios, Hollywood, California; Conway Recording Studios, Hollywood, California; Luke's in the Boo, Malibu, California; Jungle City Studios, New York City, and Blackbird Recording Studios, Nashville, Tennessee

Personnel

- Armando C. Pérez – songwriter, vocals
- Kesha Sebert – songwriter, vocals
- Dr. Luke – songwriter, producer, instruments, programming
- Priscilla Hamilton – songwriter
- Jamie Sanderson – songwriter
- Breyan Isaac – songwriter
- Cirkut – songwriter, producer, instruments, programming
- Aaron "AD" Arnold – songwriter
- Pebe Sebert – songwriter
- Lee Oskar – songwriter
- Keri Oskar – songwriter
- Greg Errico – songwriter
- Sermstyle – producer
- Nick Seeley – additional production
- Al Burna – engineer
- Rachel Findlen – engineer
- Clint Gibbs – engineer
- Benny Steele – engineer
- Ryan Gladieux – engineer
- Juan P. Negrete – engineer
- Alan Da Fonseca – engineer
- Ernesto Olivera – engineer
- Eric Eylands – assistant engineer
- Paul Harrington – harmonica
- Serban Ghenea – mixer
- John Hanes – engineer for mix

Credits adapted from the liner notes on BMI.

== Charts ==
=== Weekly charts ===
Weekly chart performance for "Timber"
Chart (2013–2015)	Peak position
Australia (ARIA)	4
Australia (ARIA Dance)	1
Austria (Ö3 Austria Top 40)	1
Belgium (Ultratop 50 Flanders)	4
Belgium Dance (Ultratop Flanders)	3
Belgium (Ultratop 50 Wallonia)	6
Belgium Dance (Ultratop Wallonia)	2
Brazil (Billboard Brasil Hot 100)	29
Brazil Hot Pop Songs	9
Bulgaria (IFPI)	2
Canada Hot 100 (Billboard)	1
Canada AC (Billboard)	28
Canada CHR/Top 40 (Billboard)	1
Canada Hot AC (Billboard)	1
CIS Airplay (TopHit)	17
Colombia (National-Report)	1
Czech Republic Airplay (ČNS IFPI)	2
Czech Republic Singles Digital (ČNS IFPI)	7
Denmark (Tracklisten)	1
Europe (Billboard Euro Digital Songs)	2
Finland (Suomen virallinen lista)	1
France (SNEP)	8
Germany (GfK)	1
Greece Digital Song Sales (Billboard)	4
Hungary (Dance Top 40)	4
Hungary (Rádiós Top 40)	1
Hungary (Single Top 40)	2
Ireland (IRMA)	2
Israel International Airplay (Media Forest)	1
Italy Airplay (EarOne)	15
Italy (FIMI)	7
Japan Hot 100 (Billboard)	16
Japan Adult Contemporary (Billboard)	6
Latvia (European Hit Radio)	6
Lebanon (Lebanese Top 20)	6
Lithuania (European Hit Radio)	1
Luxembourg Digital Song Sales (Billboard)	3
Mexico Airplay (Billboard)	1
Mexico Anglo (Monitor Latino)	2
Mexico Ingles Airplay (Billboard)	3
Netherlands (Dutch Top 40)	1
Netherlands (Mega Top 50)	1
Netherlands (Single Top 100)	3
New Zealand (Recorded Music NZ)	3
Norway (VG-lista)	1
Poland Airplay (ZPAV)	3
Poland Dance (ZPAV)	2
Poland (Video Chart)	2
Portugal Digital Songs (Billboard)	3
Romania Airplay (Media Forest)	5
Russia Airplay (TopHit)	17
Scottish Singles Sales (Official Charts)	1
Slovakia Airplay (ČNS IFPI)	2
Slovakia Singles Digital (ČNS IFPI)	2
Slovenia (SloTop50)	1
South Africa Airplay (EMA)	1
South Korea (Gaon)	114
South Korea Foreign (Gaon)	2
Spain (Promusicae)	5
Sweden (Sverigetopplistan)	1
Switzerland (Schweizer Hitparade)	3
Turkey (Number One Top 20)	1
UK Singles (Official Charts)	1
UK Hip Hop/R&B (Official Charts)	1
Ukraine Airplay (TopHit)	24
US Billboard Hot 100	1
US Adult Pop Airplay (Billboard)	11
US Dance Club Songs (Billboard)	1
US Dance Airplay (Billboard)	5
US Hot Rap Songs (Billboard)	1
US Latin Airplay (Billboard)	23
US Pop Airplay (Billboard)	1
US Rhythmic Airplay (Billboard)	3
Venezuela Pop Rock General (Record Report)	1

Weekly chart performance
Chart (2025–2026)	Peak position
Lithuania (AGATA)	38
Poland (Polish Streaming Top 100)	72

=== Year-end charts ===
Year-end chart performance for "Timber"
Chart (2013)	Position
Australia (ARIA)	31
Australia (ARIA Dance)	6
Austria (Ö3 Austria Top 40)	47
Belgium (Ultratop Flanders)	72
Belgium Dance (Ultratop Flanders)	44
Belgium Dance (Ultratop Wallonia)	56
CIS (TopHit)	173
France (SNEP)	145
Germany (GfK)	40
Netherlands (Dutch Top 40)	61
Netherlands (Single Top 100)	43
New Zealand (Recorded Music NZ)	43
Sweden (Sverigetopplistan)	33
South Korea Foreign (Gaon)	118

Chart (2014)	Position
Australia (ARIA)	61
Australia (ARIA Dance)	12
Austria (Ö3 Austria Top 40)	22
Belgium (Ultratop Flanders)	47
Belgium (Ultratop Wallonia)	52
Belgium Dance (Ultratop Flanders)	41
Belgium Dance (Ultratop Wallonia)	36
Brazil (Crowley)	49
Canada Hot 100 (Billboard)	4
CIS Airplay (TopHit)	133
CIS (TopHit)	157
Denmark (Tracklisten)	17
France (SNEP)	53
Germany (GfK)	19
Hungary (Dance Top 100)	16
Hungary (Rádiós Top 100)	34
Hungary (Single Top 40)	11
Ireland (IRMA)	7
Israel (Media Forest)	29
Italy Airplay (EarOne)	59
Italy (FIMI)	12
Japan Adult Contemporary (Billboard)	68
Japan Hot Overseas (Billboard)	14
Japan Radio Songs (Billboard)	43
Netherlands (Dutch Top 40)	18
Netherlands (Single Top 100)	45
New Zealand (Recorded Music NZ)	25
Russia Airplay (TopHit)	154
Slovenia (SloTop50)	8
South Korea Foreign (Gaon)	57
Spain (PROMUSICAE)	19
Sweden (Sverigetopplistan)	12
Switzerland (Schweizer Hitparade)	25
Ukraine Airplay (Tophit)	86
UK Singles (Official Charts)	9
US Billboard Hot 100	11
US Adult Pop Airplay (Billboard)	36
US Dance Club Songs (Billboard)	18
US Dance/Mix Show Airplay (Billboard)	23
US Hot Rap Songs (Billboard)	2
US Pop Airplay (Billboard)	12
US Radio Songs (Billboard)	15
US Rhythmic Airplay (Billboard)	25
Venezuela Pop/Rock General (Record Report)	3
Worldwide (IFPI)	6

Chart (2015)	Position
Australia (ARIA Dance)	62
South Korea Foreign (Gaon)	79

Chart (2016)	Position
Australia (ARIA Dance)	77

Chart (2017)	Position
Australia (ARIA Dance)	93

Chart (2018)	Position
Australia (ARIA Dance)	99

Chart (2019)	Position
Australia (ARIA Dance)	88

Chart (2020)	Position
Australia (ARIA Dance)	59

Chart (2021)	Position
Australia (ARIA Dance)	42

Chart (2022)	Position
Australia (ARIA Dance)	36

Chart (2023)	Position
Australia (ARIA Dance)	43

Chart (2024)	Position
Australia (ARIA Dance)	35

Chart (2025)	Position
Australia (ARIA Dance)	26

=== Decade-end charts ===
Decade-end chart performance for "Timber"
Chart (2010–2019)	Position
Australia (ARIA)	85
UK Singles (Official Charts)	99
US Billboard Hot 100	90

== Certifications ==
Certifications for "Timber"
Region	Certification	Certified units/sales
Australia (ARIA)	7× Platinum	490,000^{‡}
Austria (IFPI Austria)	Platinum	30,000^{*}
Belgium (BRMA)	Gold	15,000^{*}
Canada (Music Canada)	7× Platinum	560,000^{*}
Denmark (IFPI Danmark)	4× Platinum	360,000^{‡}
France (SNEP)	Gold	66,666^{‡}
Germany (BVMI)	Diamond	1,000,000^{‡}
Italy (FIMI)	3× Platinum	90,000^{‡}
Japan (RIAJ)	Gold	100,000^{*}
Mexico (AMPROFON)	2× Platinum	120,000^{*}
New Zealand (RMNZ)	6× Platinum	180,000^{‡}
Norway (IFPI Norway)	15× Platinum	150,000^{‡}
Spain (Promusicae)	3× Platinum	180,000^{‡}
Sweden (GLF)	Platinum	40,000^{‡}
Switzerland (IFPI Switzerland)	Platinum	30,000^{^}
United Kingdom (BPI)	4× Platinum	2,400,000^{‡}
United States (RIAA)	12× Platinum	12,000,000^{‡}
Streaming
Denmark (IFPI Danmark)	4× Platinum	10,400,000^{†}
Japan (RIAJ)	Gold	50,000,000^{†}
Spain (Promusicae)	Platinum	8,000,000^{†}
Summaries
Worldwide (IFPI)	—	9,600,000
^{*} Sales figures based on certification alone.^{^} Shipments figures based on certification alone.^{‡} Sales+streaming figures based on certification alone.^{†} Streaming-only figures based on certification alone.

== Release history ==
Release dates and formats
Region	Date	Format	Labels	Ref.
Australia	October 7, 2013	Digital download	Polo Grounds, RCA Records, Mr. 305	
Canada	October 7, 2013	Digital download	Polo Grounds, RCA Records, Mr. 305	
France	October 7, 2013	Digital download	Polo Grounds, RCA Records, Mr. 305	
Germany	October 7, 2013	Digital download	Polo Grounds, RCA Records, Mr. 305	
Italy	October 7, 2013	Digital download	Polo Grounds, RCA Records, Mr. 305	
Spain	October 7, 2013	Digital download	Polo Grounds, RCA Records, Mr. 305	
United States	October 7, 2013	Digital download	Polo Grounds, RCA Records, Mr. 305	
Italy	October 11, 2013	Radio airplay	Polo Grounds, RCA Records, Mr. 305	
United States	October 15, 2013	Contemporary hit radio	Polo Grounds, RCA Records, Mr. 305	
Germany	November 15, 2013	CD	Polo Grounds, RCA Records, Mr. 305	
United Kingdom	December 29, 2013	Digital download	Polo Grounds, RCA Records, Mr. 305	

== See also ==
- List of Billboard Hot 100 number ones of 2014
- List of Billboard Dance Club Songs number ones of 2014
- List of number-one dance singles of 2014 (Australia)
- List of number-one singles of 2014 (South Africa)
