= Body (Sean Paul song) =

Single by Sean Paul featuring Migos

from the EP Mad Love the Prequel
- Released: 28 April 2017
- Genre: Dancehall
- Length: 3:26
- Label: Island
- Songwriters: Sean Paul Henriques; Quavious Marshall; Kiari Cephus; Kirsnick Ball; Jamal Rashid; Matthew Keaveny; Vincent Berry; Don Corleon; Joel Augustin
- Producers: Mally Mall; Don Corleon

Sean Paul singles chronology
"No Lie" / "Tek Weh Yuh Heart" (2016)	"Body" (2017)	"Ovaload" (2017)

Migos singles chronology
"Bon Appétit" (2017)	"Body" (2017)	"Slippery" (2017)

Music video
- "Body" on YouTube

"Body" is a song by Jamaican dancehall musician Sean Paul featuring American hip-hop group Migos. It is the third single from Paul's EP Mad Love the Prequel. The song was released as a digital download on 28 April 2017 by Island Records. The song debuted at number 76 on the UK Singles Chart.

== Track listing ==
Digital download
No.	Title	Length
1.	"Body" (featuring Migos)	3:26

== Charts ==
Chart (2017)	Peak position
Canada Hot 100 (Billboard)	98
Scotland Singles (OCC)	53
UK Singles (OCC)	76

== Certifications ==
Region	Certification	Certified units/sales
Canada (Music Canada)	Gold	40,000^{‡}
^{‡} Sales+streaming figures based on certification alone.

== Release history ==
Region	Date	Format	Label
United Kingdom	28 April 2017	Digital download	Island
