= SSAK3 =

South Korean pop group

- Origin: Seoul, South Korea
- Genres: K-pop; synth-pop
- Years active: 2020
- Label: MBC
- Members: Yoo Jae-suk (U-Duragon); Lee Hyori (Linda G); Rain (B. Ryong)

SSAK3 (Korean: 싹쓰리; lit. 'Clean Sweep') is a seasonal South Korean supergroup formed on the MBC variety show Hangout with Yoo. The group consists of members Yoo Jae-suk, Lee Hyori and Rain, using the stage names U-Doragon, Linda G and B.Ryong, respectively. They made their debut with the single "Beach Again" on July 25, 2020. The group members have planned for the group to potentially be a seasonal group promoting during summer and winter.

== History ==
In May 2020, comedian Yoo Jae-suk announced on his MBC variety show Hangout with Yoo that he plans to launch a co-ed singing group that summer. Later that month, singers Lee Hyo-ri and Rain joined Yoo's group, which they named SSAK3. The group debuted on July 25, performing their 90s-style single "Beach Again" on Show! Music Core. The song topped various South Korean real-time music charts, and was ranked number one on the Gaon Digital Chart for five consecutive weeks. The group also released "In The Summer", a cover of the 1994 song by Deux, and "Play That Summer", as well as three solo tracks, all of which performed well commercially.

The group's success was criticized by some netizens and those in the music industry, claiming that SSAK3 had an unfair advantage because of the publicity they received from Hangout with Yoo, their ties with MBC and the fact that all three were well-known and established industry veterans. In response, MBC noted that all proceeds from SSAK3's album sales and promotions will be donated to charities.

== Members ==
- Yoo Jae-suk (U-Doragon)
- Lee Hyori (Linda G)
- Rain (B.Ryong)

== Discography ==
=== Albums ===
Title	Album details	Peak chart positions	Sales
Title	Album details	KOR	Sales
SSAK3 Special Album (Note: Digital version of the album titled Du Ri Jyu Wa X Linda X Let's Dance and only featured solo songs of group members and acoustic version of Beach Again performed by Lee Sang Soon with instrumental versions of the songs.)	Released: August 2020; Label: MBC, Kakao M; Formats: CD, digital download, cassette	4 (Note: The special version peaked at #4, while the regular version peaked at #10)	KOR: 83,887

=== Songs ===
List of songs, with selected chart positions, showing year released and album name
Title	Year	Peak chart positions			Album
Title	Year	KOR	KOR Hot	US World	Album
"In The Summer" (여름 안에서) (Covered By SSAK3) (feat. Hwang Kwang-hee)	2020	3	4	—	Non-album singles
"Beach Again" (다시 여기 바닷가)	2020	1	1	16	Non-album singles
"Play That Summer" (그 여름을 틀어줘)	2020	2	4	—	Non-album singles
"Luv Us" (두리쥬와) (U-Doragon feat. S.B.N)	2020	18	—	—	Du Ri Jyu Wa X Linda X Let's Dance
"Linda" (Linda G feat. Yoon Mi-rae)	2020	4	—	—	Du Ri Jyu Wa X Linda X Let's Dance
"Let's dance" (신난다) (B.Ryong feat. Mamamoo)	2020	6	—	—	Du Ri Jyu Wa X Linda X Let's Dance
"Beach Again" (acoustic ver.) (다시 여기 바닷가) (Lee Sang-soon)	2020	45	—	—	Du Ri Jyu Wa X Linda X Let's Dance
"—" denotes song did not chart.

== Videography ==
=== Music videos ===
Year	Song title
2020	"In Summer"
2020	"Beach Again"
2020	"Luv Us"
2020	"Linda"
2020	"Exciting"
