= No Lie (Sean Paul song) =

2016 single by Sean Paul featuring Dua Lipa

Single by Sean Paul featuring Dua Lipa

from the EP Mad Love the Prequel
- B-side: "Tek Weh Yuh Heart"
- Released: 18 November 2016
- Genre: Reggae; tropical pop
- Length: 3:41
- Label: Island
- Songwriters: Sean Paul Henriques; Emily Warren; Jamie Sanderson; Andrew Jackson
- Producers: Sermstyle; Pip Kembo

Sean Paul singles chronology
"Rockabye" (2016)	"No Lie" / "Tek Weh Yuh Heart" (2016)	"Body" (2017)

Dua Lipa singles chronology
"Blow Your Mind (Mwah)" (2016)	"No Lie" (2016)	"Scared to Be Lonely" (2017)

Music video
- "No Lie" on YouTube

"No Lie" is a song by Jamaican dancehall musician Sean Paul featuring English singer Dua Lipa, from the former's first EP, Mad Love the Prequel (2018). The song was written by Paul, Andrew Jackson, Emily Warren, and Sermstyle. Production and co-production were handled by Sermstyle and Pip Kembo, respectively. It was released through Island Records on 18 November 2016 as the lead single from the EP. The song was later included on Dua Lipa: Complete Edition (2018), the super deluxe reissue of Lipa's eponymous debut studio album.

"No Lie" is an R&B-tinged reggae and tropical pop song, with the lyrics seeing Paul express his attraction to a girl in a club scene. Several music critics praised Lipa's vocal performance and the party-like qualities shown throughout the song. It became a successful single in Europe, entering the top 10 of the charts in 7 countries across the continent, including the UK Singles Chart, becoming Paul's 12th and Lipa's first top 10 single in the United Kingdom. The song has since been certified gold or higher in eight different territories, including Italy, where it holds a quadruple platinum certification, and the UK, having received a platinum certification in the country.

"No Lie" was accompanied by a music video, released in January 2017 that was directed by Tim Nackashi. It features Paul and Lipa dancing in several different mirrored rooms and halls. The two promoted the song with numerous live performances, including performing it at BBC Radio 1's Big Weekend, as well as Capital FM's Jingle Bell Ball and Summertime Ball. Remixes of the song by Sam Feldt and Delirious & Alex K, respectively, have been released.

== Background and composition ==
"No Lie"
A reggae and tropical pop song, "No Lie" makes use of a keyboard and beats while Paul and Lipa sing about being attracted to someone in a club scene.

"No Lie" was written by Sean Paul alongside Andrew Jackson, Emily Warren, and Sermstyle, who also produced the song alongside Pip Kembo. Paul had been doing many writing camps at the time of writing. Sermstyle originally played the rhythm for Paul, after which he expressed his admiration of it. He wrote onto the rhythm and recorded a demo for it, with Warren singing the hook vocals on the demo, which she wrote. At the time, Paul could not imagine anyone else singing the hook. However, his management thought they should search for another vocalist and someone in the management group suggested Dua Lipa, which led to her also recording a demo of the song. After hearing the demo, Paul immediately fell in love with Lipa's voice and went on to finish the song with her vocals. Engineering was handled by Paul Bailey, while James Royo was responsible for mixing, and the song was mastered by Barry Grint at Alchemy Mastering in London.

Musically, "No Lie" is an R&B-tinged, reggae and tropical pop track, that runs for 3 minutes and 41 seconds. The production makes use of a keyboard and beats, while the opening chords give off sensuality. The song starts somewhat moody, before Lipa handles the chorus. Paul uses dancehall-like rapping and singing with a vocal rhythm, while Lipa's vocals were described as "deep" and "sultry" with a reggae-tinged accent. Lyrically, the song is about having fun in a club scene. Paul comments on the physique of a woman and his attraction to her, eventually expressing to the woman what he can do for her. The title "No Lie" comes from a saying in Jamaica that is said when you want someone to believe you.

== Release and promotion ==
Paul announced the release of "No Lie" two days prior to its release, alongside sharing a 15-second preview of the song with both his and Lipa's vocals. The song was released for digital download and streaming through Island Records as a single on 18 November 2016. On 13 January 2017, the song was released on a CD single in Germany, with Paul's single "Tek Weh Yuh Heart" that features Tory Lanez as the B-side. "No Lie" was serviced to rhythmic contemporary and contemporary hit radio stations in the United States on 17 January 2017. It was sent for radio airplay in Italy three days later. Remixes by Sam Feldt and Delirious & Alex K were released on 27 January 2017. The song serves as the lead single and closing track from Paul's debut EP Mad Love the Prequel, released 29 June 2018. It was later included as the seventh track on the second disc of the reissue of Lipa's eponymous debut studio album Dua Lipa: Complete Edition, released on 19 October 2018. "No Lie" was included on the soundtrack to the film Baywatch (2017), as well as in the opening credits of Code Black Season 3, Episode 11: "One of Our Own", in 2018.

The music video for "No Lie" was directed by Tim Nackashi and released on 10 January 2017. It was filmed at West London's Sunbeam studios in the third studio, as well as the garden. The visual showcases Paul and Lipa dancing in an assortment of mirrored rooms and halls, with Paul wearing several different parkas. Critics viewed the video as stylish, hypnotic, and dizzying. In April 2022, the video surpassed one billion views on YouTube. "No Lie" was promoted with several live performances. Paul and Lipa performed the song for the first time on 3 December 2016 at the Jingle Bell Ball for Capital FM. On 27 May, the two performed it at BBC Radio 1 Big Weekend for 2017, and Lipa also performed a solo version of the song as a medley with her track "Dreams" (2017) at the same event. Paul and Lipa performed the song for the final time together at the Summertime Ball for Capital FM 2017, while the song was included on Paul's 2017 Pinkpop Festival, 2017 RNB Fridays Live, and Glastonbury Festival 2019 setlists, as well as Lipa's setlist at Capital FM's Jingle Bell Ball 2017. The song was also included on the setlists of Lipa's Self-Titled Tour (2017–18), for which she occasionally performed it as a medley with "Dreams". Both Lipa and Paul have a little reunion to performance at the 2018 UEFA Champions League final in Kyiv, Ukraine.

== Reception ==
For Billboard, Kat Bein named the song a "totally replay-able [...] party jam," as well as calling it "real sexy" and the hook "rump-shaking." In her review for V, Mariana Fernandez viewed the song as an "impressive morph of dancehall, reggae, and pop," while also praising the "infectious combination" of Paul and Lipa's vocals. Robbie Daw of Idolator thought the song is "quite a jam," and "a step in the right direction" for Paul. He went on to compliment Paul's choice of Lipa as a featured artist, and noted how she mirrors the melody of "Puttin' On the Ritz" (1929) by Irving Berlin. The staff of Much named the song "an instant addition to your weekend playlist." HotNewHipHop's Danny Schwartz thought it would be commercially successful on the radio. The Singles Jukebox staff gave the song a rating of 4.25/10, with many complimenting Lipa's performance, but many criticizing how Paul was stuck in the past. In April 2020, Christopher Rosa of Glamour ranked "No Lie" as Lipa's fourth worst song, stating it is "just off."

== Commercial performance ==
"No Lie" became a successful single in Europe. In the United Kingdom, the song debuted at number 53 on the UK Singles Chart dated 23 November 2016. The song lasted for 30 weeks on the chart, and reached a peak of number 10 in its 11th week, becoming Paul's 12th and Lipa's first UK top 10 single. In October 2025, the song was certified triple platinum by the British Phonographic Industry (BPI) for track-equivalent sales of 1,800,000 units in the UK. The song entered the top 10 of the charts in Bulgaria, CIS, Czech Republic, Germany, Hungary, India, Italy, the Netherlands, Romania and Scotland. It was certified platinum in Germany and the Netherlands by the Bundesverband Musikindustrie (BVMI) and the Nederlandse Vereniging van Producenten en Importeurs van beeld – en geluidsdragers (NVPI), respectively as well as diamond in France by the Syndicat National de l'Édition Phonographique (SNEP). In Italy, the song reached number 11 on the FIMI Singles Chart, and was certified quadruple platinum by the Federazione Industria Musicale Italiana (FIMI) for 200,000 track-equivalent sales in the country. Outside of Europe, it reached number 43 and 45 in Venezuela and Colombia, respectively, as well as charting at number 20 on the Hot Canadian Digital Songs chart, and number 27 on the Mexico Airplay chart.

== Music video ==
The music video for "No Lie" was directed by Tim Nackashi and released on 10 January 2017. It was filmed at West London's Sunbeam studios in the third studio, as well as the garden. The visual showcases Paul and Lipa dancing in an assortment of mirrored rooms and halls, with Paul wearing several different parkas. Critics viewed the video as stylish, hypnotic, and dizzying. In April 2022, the video surpassed one billion views on YouTube.

== Track listings ==
- Digital download and streaming
1. "No Lie" (featuring Dua Lipa) – 3:41
- CD single
1. "No Lie" (featuring Dua Lipa) – 3:41
2. "Tek Weh Yuh Heart" (featuring Tory Lanez) – 3:46
- Digital download and streaming – remixes
1. "No Lie" (featuring Dua Lipa) [Sam Feldt remix] – 2:52
2. "No Lie" (featuring Dua Lipa) [Delirious & Alex K remix] – 4:18

== Personnel ==
- Sean Paul – vocals
- Dua Lipa – vocals
- Sermstyle – production
- Pip Kembo/Dr Chaii – co-production
- James Royo – mixing
- Paul Bailey – engineering
- Barry Grint – mastering

== Charts ==
=== Weekly charts ===
Chart performance for "No Lie"
Chart (2016–2022)	Peak position
Austria (Ö3 Austria Top 40)	13
Belgium (Ultratop 50 Flanders)	44
Belgium (Ultratop 50 Wallonia)	18
Bulgaria Airplay (PROPHON)	3
Canada (Hot Canadian Digital Songs)	20
CIS Airplay (TopHit)	8
Colombia (National-Report)	45
Czech Republic Airplay (ČNS IFPI)	2
Czech Republic Singles Digital (ČNS IFPI)	48
France (SNEP)	27
Germany (GfK)	10
Global 200 (Billboard) (Note: The Billboard Global 200 chart was launched in September 2020. Therefore, "No Lie" did not have a full run on the chart.)	184
Hungary (Dance Top 40)	10
Hungary (Rádiós Top 40)	2
Hungary (Single Top 40)	9
India International Singles (IMI)	7
Ireland (IRMA)	31
Italy (FIMI)	11
Mexico (Billboard Mexican Airplay)	27
Netherlands (Dutch Top 40)	10
Netherlands (Single Top 100)	14
Portugal (AFP)	66
Romania (Media Forest)	8
Russia Airplay (Tophit)	7
Scotland Singles (Official Charts)	9
Slovakia Airplay (ČNS IFPI)	19
Slovakia Singles Digital (ČNS IFPI)	29
Slovenia (SloTop50)	28
Switzerland (Schweizer Hitparade)	32
UK Singles (Official Charts)	10
Venezuela (National-Report)	63

=== Year-end charts ===
2017 year-end chart performance for "No Lie"
Chart (2017)	Position
Belgium (Ultratop Wallonia)	75
France (SNEP)	87
Germany (Official German Charts)	83
Hungary (Dance Top 40)	23
Hungary (Rádiós Top 40)	40
Hungary (Single Top 40)	39
Israel (Media Forest)	21
Italy (FIMI)	16
Netherlands (Dutch Top 40)	62
Poland (Polish Airplay Top 100)	39
Switzerland (Schweizer Hitparade)	65
UK Singles (OCC)	67

2022 year-end chart performance for "No Lie"
Chart (2022)	Position
Hungary (Rádiós Top 40)	59

2024 year-end chart performance for "No Lie"
Chart (2024)	Position
Hungary (Rádiós Top 40)	83

== Certifications ==
Certifications and sales for "No Lie"
Region	Certification	Certified units/sales
Austria (IFPI Austria)	Platinum	30,000^{‡}
Brazil (Pro-Música Brasil)	Diamond	250,000^{‡}
Canada (Music Canada)	Platinum	80,000^{‡}
Denmark (IFPI Danmark)	Gold	45,000^{‡}
France (SNEP)	Diamond	333,333^{‡}
Germany (BVMI)	3× Gold	600,000^{‡}
Italy (FIMI)	4× Platinum	200,000^{‡}
Netherlands (NVPI)	Platinum	40,000^{‡}
New Zealand (RMNZ)	3× Platinum	90,000^{‡}
Poland (ZPAV)	3× Platinum	60,000^{‡}
Portugal (AFP)	Platinum	10,000^{‡}
Spain (Promusicae)	Platinum	60,000^{‡}
United Kingdom (BPI)	3× Platinum	1,800,000^{‡}
^{‡} Sales+streaming figures based on certification alone.

== Release history ==
Release dates and formats for "No Lie"
Region	Date	Format(s)	Version	Label	Ref.
Various	18 November 2016	Digital download; streaming	Original	Island	
Germany	13 January 2017	CD single	Original	Universal	
United States	17 January 2017	Rhythmic contemporary radio	Original	Republic	
United States	17 January 2017	Contemporary hit radio	Original	Republic	
Italy	20 January 2017	Radio airplay	Original	Universal	
Various	27 January 2017	Digital download; streaming	Remixes	Island	

== See also ==
- List of UK top-ten singles in 2017
- List of top 10 singles in 2017 (Germany)
- List of Platinum singles in the United Kingdom awarded since 2000
- List of most-viewed YouTube videos
- List of most-streamed songs on Spotify
