= Holly Lester =

Northern Irish disc jockey

- Origin: Hamiltonsbawn, County Armagh
- Genres: House, Techno
- Occupations: Record producer, Disc Jockey
- Labels: Terrazzo, Duality Trax
- Website: www.onehouse.com/artists/holly-lester

Holly Lester is an electronic dance music disc jockey from County Armagh, Northern Ireland. Lester is co-founder of the Free The Night advocacy organisation aimed at boosting the night-time economy in Northern Ireland.

== Career ==
Lester first started to beat-match at age 14, while growing up in County Armagh. She first came to prominence working as a disc jockey in dance venues in the north-west of England, has been a regular "homegrown" performer at the AVA Festival in Belfast, and was in the top 50 of the The Guardian's pick of the best new music for 2019. Lester has gone on to achieve wider recognition, playing sets across Europe, and in Australia and Indonesia.

In 2019 Amy Fielding of DJ Mag called Lester "one of Northern Irelands' most exciting selectors". She was also nominated for a DJ Mag award in 2021 in the Underground Hero category. Lester has been featured on BBC Radio a number of times, including performing mixes in both 2021 and 2022. Her sound has been described by The Guardian as "warm analogue jams".

Lester set up the Duality Trax record label in 2020, which has released music for artists including Abdul Raeva and Tifra. In August 2021 the label released a compilation, "Visions Vol. 1", in aid of Doctors Without Borders, which was described by DJ Mag as a "globetrotting, genre-hopping affair". In 2023 Duality released the follow-up compilation, "Visions Vol. 2", with all proceeds aiding the Palestine Children's Relief Fund.

=== Free The Night ===
Lester, along with Boyd Sleator, is the founder of Free the Night, a non-profit organisation which started in 2021 with the aim of improving the night-time economy in Northern Ireland, including making it more "safe, progressive and culturally diverse" and campaigning for improved public transport and updated licencing laws.

In early 2026 it was announced that the organisation, with Lester as the main claimant, would be taking the Department for Communities to court for a judicial review over their response to research commissioned by the department and carried out by Stirling University a year earlier.
