= List of top 10 singles in 2017 (Germany) =

This is a list of singles that have peaked in the top 10 of the German Singles Chart in 2017.

== Top 10 singles ==
Entry date	Single	Artist	Peak	Peak reached	Weeks
Singles from 2016
16 December	"Bad Ideas"	Alle Farben	7	6 January	3
16 December	"Alone"	Alan Walker	4	6 January	8
Singles from 2017
6 January	"Shed a Light"	Robin Schulz & David Guetta (featuring Cheat Codes)	6	6 January	3
13 January	"Shape of You"	Ed Sheeran	1	13 January	20*
13 January	"Castle on the Hill"	Ed Sheeran	2	13 January	11
13 January	"I Don't Wanna Live Forever"	Zayn & Taylor Swift	2	10 February	10
20 January	"Never Give Up"	Sia	8	20 January	1
20 January	"Call on Me"	Starley	7	27 January	6
27 January	"Paris"	The Chainsmokers	3	17 February	9
27 January	"Now and Later"	Sage the Gemini	6	27 January	3
27 January	"No Lie"	Sean Paul (featuring Dua Lipa)	10	27 January	2
3 February	"Way Down We Go"	Kaleo	6	10 February	4
10 February	"Steady 1234"	DJ Vice (featuring Jasmine Thompson & Skizzy Mars)	9	10 February	1
17 February	"Loin"	Maître Gims (featuring Dany Synthé)	6	24 February	4
17 February	"Scared to Be Lonely"	Martin Garrix (featuring Dua Lipa)	9	24 February	2
24 February	"It Ain't Me"	Kygo & Selena Gomez	2	3 March	12
3 March	"Something Just Like This"	The Chainsmokers & Coldplay	4	3 March	13*
3 March	"Chained to the Rhythm"	Katy Perry (featuring Skip Marley)	6	3 March	6
3 March	"Tuesday"	Burak Yeter (featuring Danelle Sandoval)	2	24 March	13*
3 March	"Skin"	Rag'n'Bone Man	10	3 March	1
10 March	"Galway Girl"	Ed Sheeran	5	17 March	12*
17 March	"You Don't Know Me"	Jax Jones (featuring Raye)	3	7 April	8
24 March	"Nummer 1"	Zuna (featuring Azet & Noizy)	7	24 March	4
31 March	"Swalla"	Jason Derulo (featuring Nicki Minaj & Ty Dolla Sign)	4	28 April	9*
31 March	"Despacito"	Luis Fonsi & Daddy Yankee	1	28 April	9*
14 April	"Unter den Wolken"	Die Toten Hosen	2	14 April	1
14 April	"Menschen Leben Tanzen Welt"	Jim Pandzko (featuring Jan Böhmermann)	10	14 April	1
21 April	"Symphony"	Clean Bandit (featuring Zara Larsson)	9	21 April	3
28 April	"No Roots"	Alice Merton	2	12 May	5*
5 May	"I'm the One"	DJ Khaled (featuring Justin Bieber, Quavo, Chance the Rapper & Lil Wayne)	4	26 May	4*
12 May	"How It Is (Wap Bap …)"	Bibi H.	9	12 May	1
19 May	"There's Nothing Holdin' Me Back"	Shawn Mendes	7	26 May	2*
26 May	"OK"	Robin Schulz (featuring James Blunt)	8	26 May	1*

* In Top 10 as of 26 May 2017

== 2016 peaks ==
- Rag'n'Bone Man - "Human" (Peak: #1, Weeks: 19)
- Bonez MC & RAF Camora (featuring Maxwell) - "Ohne mein Team" (Peak: #7, Weeks: 6)
- The Weeknd (featuring Daft Punk) - "Starboy" (Peak: #3, Weeks: 15)
- David Guetta & Cedric Gervais (featuring Chris Willis) - "Would I Lie to You?" (Peak: #2, Weeks: 11)
- James Arthur - "Say You Won't Let Go" (Peak: #6, Weeks: 10)
- Clean Bandit (featuring Sean Paul & Anne-Marie) - "Rockabye" (Peak: #1, Weeks: 15)
- Mark Forster - "Chöre" (Peak: #2, Weeks: 11)
