= Colors (Jason Derulo song) =

Single by Jason Derulo featuring Maluma
- Released: March 9, 2018
- Recorded: 2018
- Genre: Dancehall; Pop
- Length: 3:07 (solo version); 3:20 (Maluma version)
- Label: Warner Bros.
- Songwriters: Jason Desrouleaux; Edgar Barrera; Ishmael Montague; Geoffrey Early; Jamie Sanderson; Nija Charles
- Producers: Sermstyle; ISM

Jason Derulo featuring Maluma singles chronology
"1, 2, 3" (2018)	"Colors" (2018)	"Goodbye" (2018)

Maluma singles chronology
"El Clavo" (2018)	"Colors" (2018)	"Hands on Me" (2018)

Alternative cover
- Spanglish version with Maluma

Music video
- "Colors"(English Ver.) on YouTube "Colors"(Spanish Ver.) on YouTube "Colors"(Saudi Ver.) on YouTube "Colors"(Egyptian Ver.) on YouTube "Colors"(Moroccan Ver.) on YouTube

"Colors" is a song by American singer and songwriter Jason Derulo. It was the Coca-Cola promotional anthem for the 2018 FIFA World Cup. The song was released on March 9, 2018. On April 12, 2018, Derulo performed the song live during a medley with "Tip Toe" and "Swalla" at the German Echo Music Prize. A Spanglish version with Colombian singer Maluma was released on April 13, 2018.

== Background ==
Derulo collaborated with Coca-Cola to produce the song.

== Music video ==
A sneak peek video for the music video of the song was released on Coca-Cola's YouTube channel on February 15, 2018. In the video, Jason Derulo is seen holding a ball which contains the label of the Coca-Cola brand, as well as a representative for a Coca-Cola campaign. The music video for the solo version of the song was released on April 11, 2018, on Derulo's Vevo account on YouTube. Two days later, the music video for the Maluma version of the single was released.

== Track listing ==
- Digital download – single
1. "Colors" – 3:07
2. "Colors" (with Maluma) – 3:19
3. "Colors" (featuring Aseel Omran and Lil Eazy) – 3:28
4. "Colors" (featuring Tamer Hosny) – 2:53
5. "Colors" (featuring Douzi) – 3:10
6. "Colors" (featuring Ah Moon & AR-T) 3:35

== Remixes ==
Several remixes each titled "Colours" were released on April 20, 2018, featuring South African rapper Cassper Nyovest, Tanzanian singer Diamond Platnumz, Mozambican singer Lizha James, Ethiopian singer Sami Dan, Egyptian singer Tamer Hosny and Ugandan singer Ykee Benda. On June 18, 2018, a remix of the song was released featuring Pakistani singer Qurat-ul-Ain Balouch. Another remix was released with Maltese singer Ira Losco, to be performed at Isle of MTV Malta 2018.

== Charts ==
Original version
Chart (2018)	Peak position
Austria (Ö3 Austria Top 40)	57
Belgium (Ultratip Bubbling Under Flanders)	25
Belgium (Ultratop 50 Wallonia)	40
Germany (GfK)	47
Ireland (IRMA)	44
Lebanon (Lebanese Top 20)	16
Portugal (AFP)	96
Scottish Singles Sales (Official Charts)	61
Sweden Heatseeker (Sverigetopplistan)	10
Switzerland (Schweizer Hitparade)	63
UK Singles (Official Charts)	64

Maluma version
Chart (2018)	Peak position
Argentina Anglo (Monitor Latino)	11
Guatemala Anglo (Monitor Latino)	12
Venezuela (National-Report)	57

== Certifications ==
Certifications for "Colors"
Region	Certification	Certified units/sales
United Kingdom (BPI)	Silver	200,000^{‡}
^{‡} Sales+streaming figures based on certification alone.
