= Dancing King =

Single by Yoo Jae-suk and Exo

from the album SM Station Season 1
- Released: September 17, 2016
- Recorded: 2016
- Studio: SM Blue Ocean (Seoul); MonoTree (Seoul)
- Genre: K-pop; dance; tropical house; moombahton; EDM
- Label: SM; Genie
- Composers: Peter Tambakis; Sermstyle; Phil Cook; Otha "Vakseen" Davis III; MZMC
- Lyricists: JQ; Jang Yeo-jin
- Producers: Sermstyle; Phil Cook

Exo singles chronology
"Lotto" (2016)	"Dancing King" (2016)	"For Life" (2016)

Music video
- "Dancing King" on YouTube

"Dancing King" is a song by South Korean comedian Yoo Jae-suk and South Korean–Chinese boy band Exo. The song is a part of SM Station and is a collaboration single for the variety show Infinite Challenge. It was released digitally on September 17, 2016, by SM Entertainment.

== Background and release ==
On September 12, 2016, it was revealed that the next SM Station single, titled "Dancing King" would feature Yoo Jae-suk and Exo and be released on September 17. It was also revealed that all the profits of the single would be donated. The song has been described as "a dance song based on brass sound and passionate samba rhythm". It was officially released on September 17.

== Music video ==
The music video was released following which featured Exo. It features shots of the dress rehearsal and the actual performance from Exo Planet #3 – The Exo'rdium concert in Bangkok interspersed with more lighthearted clips of Yoo Jae-suk and EXO members jamming out.

== Live performance ==
The artists performed the song at the ExoPlanet 3 – The Exo'rdium concert in Bangkok on September 11, 2016, before its release. The performance was aired on episode no. 498 of Infinite Challenge which featured the artists' rehearsal for the song.

== Track listing ==
No.	Title	Lyrics	Music	Arrangement	Length
1.	"Dancing King"	JQ, Jang Yeo-jin	Peter Tambakis, Sermstyle, Phil Cook, MZMC, Otha `Vakseen` Davis III	Sermstyle, Phil Cook	04:04
2.	"Dancing King" (Instrumental)		Peter Tambakis, Sermstyle, Phil Cook, MZMC, Otha `Vakseen` Davis III	Sermstyle, Phil Cook	04:04
Total length:					08:08

== Commercial performance ==
The song debuted at No. 2 on the South Korean Gaon Digital Chart and on Billboard's US World Digital Songs chart.

== Credits and personnel ==
Credits adapted from the single's liner notes, according to Melon.

Studio

- SM Blue Ocean Studio – recording
- MonoTree Studio – recording, digital editing
- doobdoob Studio – digital editing
- SM Yellow Tail Studio – mixing
- Sterling Sound – mastering

Personnel

- SM Entertainment – executive producer
- Lee Soo-man – producer
- Exo – vocals
- Yoo Jae-suk – vocals
- JQ – lyrics
- Jang Yeo-jin – lyrics
- Sermstyle – producer, composition, arrangement
- Phil Cook – producer, composition, arrangement
- Peter Tambakis – composition
- Otha "Vakseen" Davis III – composition
- MZMC – composition
- G-High – vocal directing, recording, Pro Tools operating, digital editing
- ESBEE – background vocals
- Kye Bum-joo – background vocals
- Kim Cheol-sun – recording
- Jang Woo-young – digital editing
- Koo Jong-pil – mixing
- Tom Coyne – mastering

== Charts ==
=== Weekly charts ===
Chart (2016)	Peak position
South Korea (Gaon)	2
US World Digital Songs (Billboard)	2

=== Monthly charts ===
Chart (2016)	Peak position
South Korea (Gaon)	10

=== Year-end charts ===
Chart (2016)	Peak position
South Korea (Gaon)	90

== Sales ==
Region	Sales
South Korea (Gaon)	648,506

== Awards and nominations ==
Year	Award	Category	Result
2017	Gaon Chart K-Pop Awards	Song of the Year (September)	Nominated

== Release history ==
Region	Date	Format	Label
South Korea	September 17, 2016	Digital download; streaming	SM; Genie
Various	September 17, 2016	Digital download; streaming	SM; Genie
