= Sermstyle =

British producer and singer (born 1987)

- Sermstyle, April 2015

Background information
- Born: Jamie Michael Robert Sanderson; 24 November 1987 (age 38); South Shields, England
- Genres: Pop; electropop; dance; R&B; hip hop; dubstep
- Occupations: Singer; songwriter; record producer; remixer
- Instruments: Piano; electronic keyboard
- Years active: 2010–present
- Label: APG

Jamie Michael Robert Sanderson (born 24 November 1987 in South Shields, England), known professionally as Sermstyle, is a British singer, songwriter, record producer, and remixer who lives and works from Los Angeles.

== Recognition ==
Sermstyle was featured on BBC Radio 1 & BBC Radio 1Xtra The UK Producers documentary which first aired 26 September 2011.

In December 2011, Sermstyle featured in the BBC documentary Grime Up North, where, BBC 1xtra DJ, Charlie Sloth "went on a road-trip to find the hottest rappers up North and try to understand why rap music in the UK is dominated by the London scene." Charlie travels to Newcastle to meet Sermstyle to be introduced to some of Newcastle's rap artists.

Sermstyle signed to Mike Caren's publishing company Artist Publishing Group in January 2013.

In the Songsplits Top 100 producers in the world, Sermstyle was ranked 86th.

Sermstyle received an ASCAP Pop Music Award for "Timber" at the 32nd Annual ASCAP Pop Music Awards.

Sermstyle was nominated for a 2017 Latin Grammy award, for the song "Hey Ma", which featured on The Fate of the Furious soundtrack.

== Commercial discography ==
| Year | Artist | Song | Charting |
|---|---|---|---|
| 2012 | Wisin & Yandel | "Una Bendición" | Number one Latin album, Grammy nominated |
| 2013 | Pitbull | "Timber" featuring Kesha | Number one Billboard Hot 100, number one UK Singles Chart, number one in over 25 countries, 20× Platinum worldwide, one billion YouTube views |
| 2013 | Flo Rida | "How I Feel" | Number one UK R&B Singles Chart, Number 8 UK Singles Chart |
| 2015 | Furious 7: Original Motion Picture Soundtrack | "Ride Out" featuring Kid Ink, Tyga, Wale, YG and Rich Homie Quan | Number one Billboard 200 album, number one soundtrack, number one Top R&B/Hip-Hop Albums chart |
| 2015 | Flo Rida | "I Don't Like It, I Love It" featuring Robin Thicke and Verdine White | Number seven UK Singles Chart, US Platinum, Australia Platinum, Spain Platinum, New Zealand Platinum |
| 2015 | Kalin and Myles | "Brokenhearted" | — |
| 2015 | Kalin and Myles | "Changed My Life" | — |
| 2015 | Flo Rida | "That's What I Like" featuring Icona Pop and Fitz | Number two Billboard soundtrack |
| 2015 | Fleur East | "Baby Don't Dance" | UK Silver album |
| 2015 | Fleur East | "Tears Will Dry" | UK Silver album |
| 2016 | Capital Cities | "Vowels" | EA Sports FIFA 17 OST |
| 2016 | EXO and Yoo Jae-suk | "Dancing King" | Number two Billboard US World Digital Songs chart |
| 2016 | Sean Paul | "No Lie" featuring Dua Lipa | Number ten UK Singles Chart, Platinum UK, Gold USA, Gold Germany, Platinum Italy, Platinum France |
| 2017 | Pitbull and J Balvin | "Hey Ma" (Spanish) featuring Camila Cabello | Number one Latin Digital Songs Sales chart, number one Spain, number one Panama, Platinum Spain, Latin Grammy nominated |
| 2017 | Trey Songz | "1x1" | Number one Billboard R&B album, Number three Billboard 200 album |
| 2017 | J Balvin and Pitbull | "Hey Ma" (English) featuring Camila Cabello | — |
| 2017 | Alex Aiono | "Question" | — |
| 2017 | Demi Lovato | "Cry Baby" | Number three Billboard 200 album, US Platinum album |
| 2017 | Pitbull | "Por Favor" featuring Fifth Harmony | — |
| 2018 | Jason Derulo | "Colors" | Coca-Cola promotional anthem for the 2018 FIFA World Cup, EA Sports FIFA 17 OST |
| 2018 | Flo Rida | "Sweet Sensation" | — |
| 2018 | Jason Derulo and Maluma | "Colors" | — |
| 2018 | DJ Vice, Becky G and Mr Eazi | "Don't Go" | — |
| 2018 | Zara Larsson | "Ruin My Life" | Number nine UK Singles Chart, Gold UK, Gold USA |

== Mixtape discography ==
| Artist | Song | Mixtape | Year |
|---|---|---|---|
| Young Buck | "Steriodz" | Non-album single | 2010 |
| Wiz Khalifa | "Still Blazin" | Kush & Orange Juice | 2010 |
| Kid Ink | "Home" featuring Bei Maejor | Daydreamer | 2011 |
| Kid Ink | "Feel the Pain" featuring Kyle Christopher | Daydreamer | 2011 |
| Kendrick Lamar | "I'm Ghost" featuring Nu Jerzy Devil | Non-album single | 2012 |
