= AVA Festival =

Music Festival in Northern Ireland

AVA Festival (Audio Visual Arts)
- Genre: House, Techno, Garage, Drum & Bass, Reggaeton, Hip-Hop, Punk
- Dates: 29.5.2026 – 30.5.2026
- Frequency: Annually
- Venue: Titanic Slipways
- Locations: Belfast, Northern Ireland
- Years active: 2015 - Present
- Founder: Sarah McBriar
- Next event: https://ra.co/events/2277628
- Organiser: UP Productions Ltd
- Website: avafestival.com

AVA Festival is an annual Belfast-based event, founded in 2015. Initially a one-day event, the Audio-Visual Arts festival has grown to take place over a weekend, at the start of each summer. It has been held at various sites in Belfast, including T13, S13 (a former B&Q warehouse), Boucher Playing Fields. Since 2022, AVA has taken place on The Titanic Slipway. The festival includes international and local acts, and artists that have played at the festival include Underworld, Bicep, Central Cee, Peggy Gou, Holly Lester, Larry Heard, LSDXOXO, Orbital, and Kerri Chandler. AVA events have also been held in Holland, Great Britain, and India, with a second weekend-long event held in London.

== History ==
The festival was founded in 2015 by Sarah McBriar, sister to Matthew McBriar of Bicep, who following attending the Glastonbury Festival had wanted to bring a similar event to Belfast. The name AVA was derived as an acronym for Audio, Visual, and Arts. While the inaugural event was in Belfast in 2015, the festival has also been held in Mumbai, Amsterdam, Glasgow and London. The initial event had c. 1,500 attendees for a one-day event, which by 2022 had increased in time-span to be a weekend event with c. 16,000 attendees. In 2018 the event was held in an "old B&Q warehouse", the 2020 event was cancelled due to the COVID-19 pandemic, in 2021 the event was held at the Boucher Road Playing Fields in Belfast, and in 2022 AVA was held at the Titanic Slipway also in Belfast.

== Content ==
The event typically has performances from electronic dance music acts, which include both local "homegrown" and more internationally recognised musicians. Artists that have played at AVA include Holly Lester, Larry Heard, LSDXOXO, Orbital, and Bicep. The festival also includes talk and lectures. AVA has been described in the music press as "one of the world's most exciting electronic festivals", and has been credited as creating a "second age of rave" in Northern Ireland.

== See also ==
- List of electronic music festivals
