= Laborhood on Hire =

South Korean television show

- Promotional poster
- Hangul: 일로 만난 사이
- Lit.: Relationship Formed at Work
- RR: Illo mannan sai
- MR: Illo mannan sai
- Genre: Reality
- Country of origin: South Korea
- Original language: Korean
- No. of seasons: 1
- No. of episodes: 9

Production
- Executive producer: Go Min-gu
- Production location: South Korea
- Running time: 90 minutes

Original release
- Network: tvN
- Release: August 24 – October 26, 2019

Laborhood on Hire (Korean: 일로 만난 사이; RR: Illo mannan sai) was a South Korean reality show program on tvN. It aired on tvN starting from August 24, 2019 to October 26, 2019 on Saturdays at 20:40 (KST).

== Synopsis ==
In this show, Yoo Jae-suk and guest celebrities head to different working places where there is a lack of employees. They work for them for a day, and at the end of the day, the guest celebrities will purchase something meaningful with the hard-earned money. Yoo will save his earnings, and on episode 9 he used it to buy assorted goods from the working places that appeared on the series as gifts to all of the guest celebrities. He also bought a hwamunseok which was crafted from the sedge he harvested on episode 3.

== Episodes ==
Episode	Air Date	Guests	Occupation	Working Location	Ref.
1	August 24, 2019	Lee Hyo-ri; Lee Sang-soon	Green tea production	Moroo Farm (Pyoseon-myeon, Seogwipo, Jeju Province)	
2	August 31, 2019	Cha Seung-won	Sweet Potato Farming using seawater	Sweet Potato Farm (Muan, South Jeolla Province)	
3	September 7, 2019	You Hee-yeol; Jung Jae-hyung	Sedge Farming	Wanggol Farm (Ganghwa Island)	
4	September 21, 2019	Simon Dominic; Gray; Code Kunst	KTX train cleaner	KTX train Depot	
5	September 28, 2019	Jang Sung-kyu; Han Hye-jin	Shiitake mushroom farming	Mushroom farm (Gurye County, South Jeolla Province)	
6	October 5, 2019	Im Won-hee; Ji Chang-wook	Sea salt farming	Gomyeo Saltworks (Buan, North Jeolla Province)	
7	October 12, 2019	Hur Jae; Ji Suk-jin	Red clay brick production	Red clay brick factory (Yeoju, Gyeonggi Province)	
8	October 19, 2019	Kim Won-hee	Cotton field farming	Hahoe Folk Village (Pungcheon-myeon, Andong, North Gyeongsang Province)	
9	October 26, 2019	—N/a	Unaired Scenes and Behind The Scenes.		

== Ratings ==
- Ratings listed below are the individual corner ratings of Laborhood on Hire. (Note: Individual corner ratings do not include commercial time, which regular ratings include.)
- In the ratings below, the highest rating for the show will be in red and the lowest rating for the show will be in blue each year.

Ep.	Broadcast date	AGB Nielsen (Nationwide)
1	August 24, 2019	4.933%
2	August 31, 2019	4.460%
3	September 7, 2019	3.046%
4	September 21, 2019	2.583%
5	September 28, 2019	3.532%
6	October 5, 2019	3.192%
7	October 12, 2019	2.888%
8	October 19, 2019	3.513%
9	October 26, 2019	2.046%
