= Yoo Jae-suk =

South Korean entertainer (born 1972)

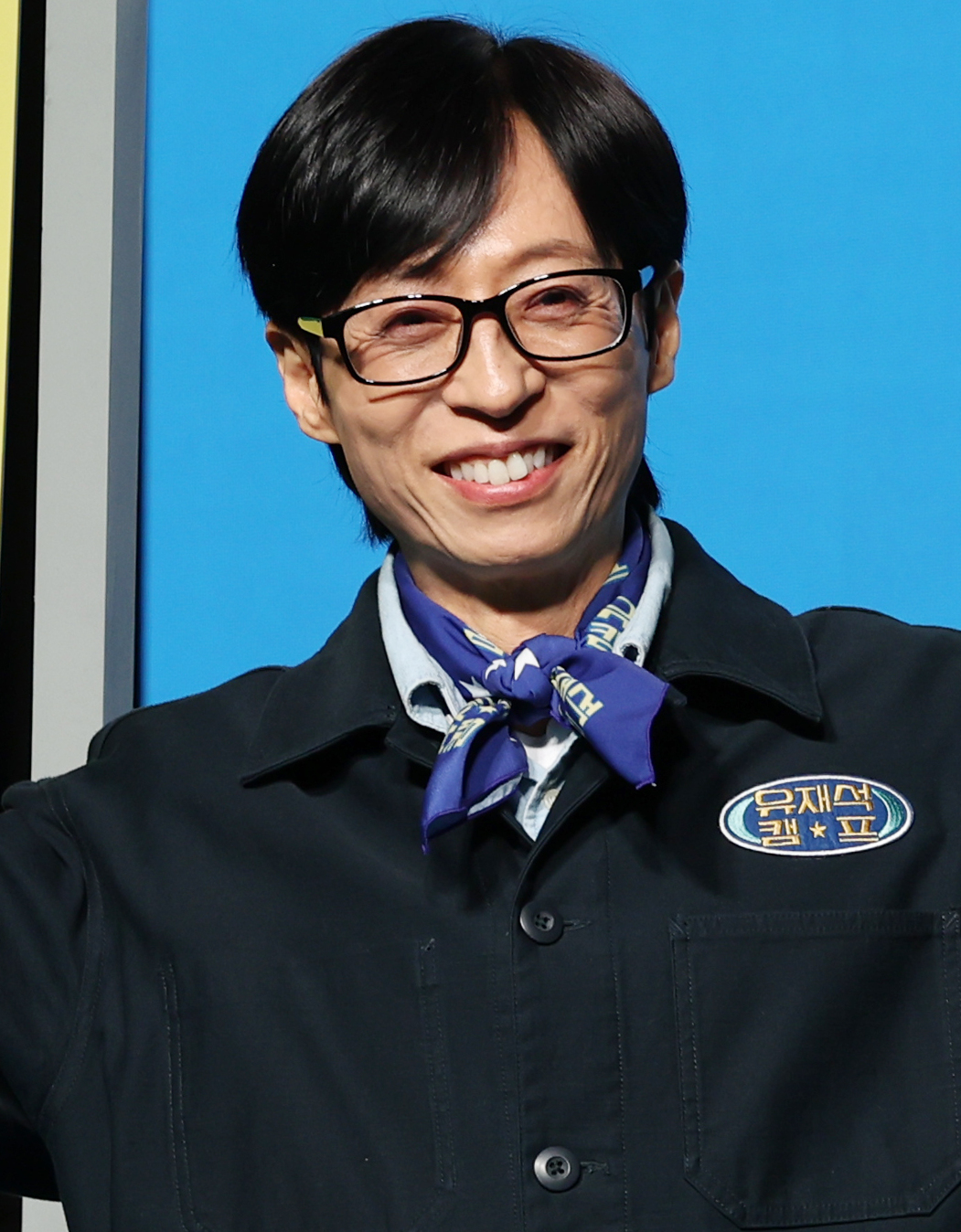
- Yoo in 2026
- Born: 14 August 1972 (age 54); Seoul, South Korea
- Education: Seoul Institute of the Arts
- Years active: 1991–present
- Agent: Antenna
- Spouse: Na Kyung-eun (m. 2008)
- Children: 2

Comedy career
- Medium: Stand-up; television
- Genres: Observational; sketch; wit; parody; slapstick
- Musical career
- Also known as: Yoo San-seul; U-Doragon; Jimmy Yoo
- Genres: Trot
- Instrument: Vocals
- Formerly of: SSAK3

Korean name
- Hangul: 유재석
- Hanja: 劉在錫
- RR: Yu Jaeseok
- MR: Yu Chaesŏk

Yoo Jae-suk (Korean: 유재석; Korean pronunciation: [jud͡ʑεsʌk̚] or [ju t͡ɕεsʌk̚]; born on 14 August 1972) is a South Korean comedian, host and television personality. He has hosted several variety television shows in South Korea, including Infinite Challenge, Running Man, Happy Together, and Hangout With Yoo. Known for his quick wit and appeal across a wide range of demographics, Yoo has established himself as one of South Korea's top comedians and TV personalities, as well as one of the most well-known and popular celebrities in South Korea.

== Early life and education ==
Born on 14 August 1972 in Suyu-dong, Gangbuk District, Seoul, South Korea, Yoo is the eldest of three siblings. In 1991, he completed his high school education and graduated from the Yongmoon High School in Seoul. In the same year, Yoo entered the acting department of Seoul Institute of the Arts.

== Career ==
=== Beginnings ===
Yoo's television debut was on the KBS Comedian Festival (for college students) in 1991, where he performed a parody of a commercial with Choi Seung-gyung. His dancing to a cover of the song "Step by Step" by New Kids on the Block was another early memorable moment. In 2002, after nine years as a relatively unknown comedian, thanks to a recommendation by Choi Jin-sil, he hosted the program Live and Enjoy Together. He then rose to prominence when he co-hosted a program called The Crash of MCs with Kang Ho-dong, Lee Hwi-jae, and Kim Han-seok.

His first Grand Prize award was for the talk show Happy Together Friends.

=== Mainstream recognition as "Nation's MC" ===
==== X-Man ====
Yoo later hosted the show X-Man, which soon grew to be one of the most popular and highest rated shows in South Korea. During that time, Yoo became increasingly popular and many programs began to nickname him "the nation's MC". He went on to host various shows, including New X-Man, Old TV, and Haja! Go! (Let's Do It) for SBS, but these were all soon canceled due to low ratings on Sunday evenings. However, X-Man has found success in international syndication, and Yoo gained popularity among Korean Wave fans.

==== Infinite Challenge ====
Yoo was a part of the cast of the top-rated comedy variety program Infinite Challenge. He had been the host-in-chief since 2005 and was one of the program's founding members.

Despite low ratings during its premiere, the show went on to become one of the most popular and influential variety programs in Korea. Dubbed the "national variety show" in Korea, Infinite Challenge became the forerunner of many programs that used a similar format. Since 2 December 2006, the program has received the highest ratings of prime-time lineups for Saturday evening.

Yoo revealed his love for the program during 1-on-1 talk with fellow co-host, Jeong Hyeong-don, on a "Pause" special (S04E300) that aired on 20 October 2012. He said, "I think my life on television and variety shows will be tied to the fate of Infinite Challenge... When will we ever get to do another program like this? No matter how hard you try, it's going to be impossible to do another show like this."

==== Talk shows ====
Yoo also co-hosts Come to Play with Kim Won-hee and Happy Together Season 3. In particular, Happy Together was one of the longest running talk shows in Korea and has consistently earned high ratings.

==== Good Sunday Variety Programs: Family Outing and Running Man ====
Yoo became the main host of Family Outing as part of SBS's Good Sunday lineup. Together with Lee Hyori, Yoon Jong-shin, Kim Soo-ro, Lee Chun-hee, Kang Dae-sung, Park Ye-jin, and Kim Jong-kook (since episode 19), they made up the "family" (cast members) of the show. Family Outing became one of the top-rated shows in Korea, consistently achieving the highest ratings for the Sunday mid-afternoon time-slot, and it gained popularity among Hallyu fans.

Since 11 July 2010, Yoo has hosted the urban action variety Running Man together with fellow Infinite Challenge member Haha, fellow Family Outing member Kim Jong-kook, other entertainers such as Ji Suk-jin, Leessang's Gary (who left since episode 324 to focus on his music career), Song Ji-hyo, Lee Kwang-soo (who left after episode 559 to continue with the rehab of an injury he sustained from the past year), Song Joong-ki (who left since episode 41 to focus on his acting career), Lizzy of After School (who left due to schedule conflicts), Jeon So-min (who left since episode 679 due to her needing some time to recharge and focus in her acting) and Yang Se-chan (both joined since episode 346) and Ji Ye-eun (joined since Episode 733). Although the program did not have a good start in ratings, it later became very popular and has held a consistent international fanbase to this day.

==== Post Infinite Challenge ====
After the end of Infinite Challenge, Yoo's biggest show, in March 2018, articles were being written about how Yoo was in a crisis and past his prime. Though with himself still topping popularity charts, new shows of his such as Laborhood on Hire and You Quiz on the Block while finding moderate success and having favourable reviews, were not able to fill the shoes of Infinite Challenge.

==== Second heyday: Hangout with Yoo ====
Hangout with Yoo was the eagerly anticipated new project with the partnership of the power duo from Infinite Challenge. The main driving forces for the success of Infinite Challenge are main program director Kim Tae-ho and Yoo, as the main host. Unfortunately, initial reactions to the show were not ideal and ratings were plummeting, leaving many Infinite Challenge fans disappointed.

After the disappointing start a few episodes in, the show began working on a new project. The project was to have Yoo learn to play a simple beat on a drum set. The recorded sample was then passed down from musician to musician in which each musician would add their own accompaniment in, and ultimately end up with a complete song. With the start of this project, ratings and reviews for the show were picking up.

With the show slowly picking up in popularity, the media labelled the show as Yoo's second heyday with his debut as a rookie trot singer, Yoo San-seul for another of the show's project. Yoo released a three-track trot album, Bbong For Yoo.

==== Other notable programs: Sugar Man and Busted! ====
From 2015 to 2016, Yoo hosted the program Two Yoo Project Sugar Man together with Yoo Hee-yeol. The program focuses on current popular artists remaking hit songs from singers who have disappeared from the public eye. The show returned again for a second season in 2018 with Yoo co-hosting alongside Yoo Hee-yeol, Joy (Red Velvet), and Park Na-rae. The show then returned again for a third season in late 2019 with Yoo co-hosting alongside You Hee-yeol, Kim Eana and Heize.

Yoo hosted both seasons of Netflix's variety show, Busted!, which aired in 2018 until 2021.

=== Guest appearances and collaborations ===
In 2012, Yoo appeared in the music video for Psy's hit single "Gangnam Style". In the video, he reprises the retro disco dancing character he created for the mock-band "Sagging Snail" in Infinite Challenge's West Coast Highway Music Festival special, in which Psy also appeared. Following his appearance, Yoo became known worldwide as the "yellow suit guy". He also appeared in Psy's follow-up single, "Gentleman".

In 2015, Yoo collaborated with JYP in Infinite Challenge.

On 15 July 2015, Yoo signed an exclusive contract with FNC Entertainment after having been without an agency for about five years.

In 2016, Yoo collaborated with Exo for the SM Station single "Dancing King", which was also a collaboration for Infinite Challenge. He performed with them at Exo's Exo Planet 3 – The Exo'rdium concert in Bangkok.

In 2020, through Hangout With Yoo, Yoo collaborated with Lee Hyo-ri and Rain to form the summer project co-ed trio SSAK3. Two original songs, "Beach Again" and "Play That Summer", and one cover song, "In Summer", were released. Soon after the end of SSAK3, Yoo collaborated with Lee Hyo-ri together with Kim Jong-min and Jung Jae-hyung on the "Refund Sisters" with Uhm Jung-hwa, Jessi & Hwasa as a promise after reaching number 1 in MBC Music Core show.

On 6 July 2021, Yoo left FNC Entertainment upon the expiration of his contract and became a free agent. On 14 July, it was announced Yoo has signed with Antenna.

On 13 December 2021, Yoo was diagnosed with COVID-19, canceled all of his schedules and took the necessary measures in accordance with quarantine agency guidelines. On 21 December 2021, it was reported that Yoo had recovered from the infection after completing home treatment for COVID-19, according to a health official's decision.

== Philanthropy ==
Since 2013, Yoo has been making steady donations to Briquette Bank to help vulnerable groups during cold winter. He had regularly made donations to House of Sharing for the women victims of the Japanese military since 2014 and in April 2018, the total of his donations was revealed to be 260 million won. In September 2018, Yoo donated 50 million won to Hope Bridge Disaster Relief Association to help the victims who are suffering from the sudden torrential rain. In April 2019, Yoo donated 50 million won to Hope Bridge Disaster Relief Association to support the victims of Gangwon forest fire. He donated 100 million won each in 2019 and 2020 to the Samsung Life Public Welfare Foundation. In August 2020, Yoo donated 100 million won to the 2020 flood damage emergency relief campaign through Hope Bridge Disaster Relief Association.

On 26 April 2021, Yoo donated 50 million won to the youth portal, as he promised to Father Lee Moon-soo during You Quiz on the Block in 21 April. In July 2021, Yoo donated 50 million to The International Development Cooperation G-Foundation and his donation was said to be used to provide sanitary products and living expenses to the underprivileged who are suffering during COVID-19 pandemic.

On 7 March 2022, Yoo donated 100 million won to the Hope Bridge Disaster Relief Association to help the victims of the massive wildfire that started in Uljin, Gyeongbuk and has spread to Samcheok, Gangwon.

In May 2022, Yoo donated 50 million won to The 11th International Development Cooperation NGO G-Foundation, which will be used for education and health support programs for women and children from low-income families.

In June 2022, Yoo donated 15 million won as medical expenses for patients in dire circumstances. On 11 August 2022, Yoo donated ₩100 million (USD 70,528.86 as of 1 November 2022) to help those affected by the 2022 South Korean floods through the Hope Bridge Korea Disaster Relief Association.

In February 2023, Yoo donated 100 million won to help in the 2023 Turkey–Syria earthquake through Hope Bridge National Disaster Relief Association. On 21 February, Yoo donated 50 million won to help provide sanitary pads for vulnerable women through the G Foundation.

In March 2025, Yoo donated 50 million won to the Hope Bridge National Disaster Relief Association for the wildfire victims in the Ulsan, Gyeongbuk, and Gyeongnam regions.

== In the media ==
Yoo has been dubbed "The Nation's MC" for his broad appeal and popularity with a wide demographic of viewers. He has consistently ranked as the top comedian in South Korea, topping the Gallup poll from 2005 to 2009, and for eleven consecutive years since 2012. He is one of the highest paid television personalities in Korea, and one of the most in-demand endorsers.

Known for his exemplary image, Yoo has consistently been picked as a role model by fellow entertainers, as well as the citizens of Korea. He makes donations regularly to several causes, and has participated in philanthropic acts.

Yoo is the first television host to have his own wax figure, currently displayed at the Grevin Seoul Museum.

== Personal life ==
On 6 July 2008, Yoo married MBC announcer, Na Kyung-eun, who worked with him on the show Infinite Challenge. Yoo and his wife had their first child, a son, Yoo Ji-ho, on 1 May 2010. Their second child, a daughter, Yoo Na-eun was born on 19 October 2018. He is a Buddhist.

== Filmography ==
=== List of current programs ===
Year	Title	Role	Ref.
2010–present	Running Man	Main cast	
2019–present	Hangout with Yoo	Main cast	
2020–present	You Quiz on the Block (Season 3)	Main cast	
2022–present	Pinggyego (DdeunDdeun)	Host	
2024–present	Synchro U	Host	
2024–present	Whenever Possible	Host	

== Discography ==
=== Singles ===
==== As lead artist ====
Title	Year	Peak chart positions	Sales (DL)	Album
Title	Year	KOR	Sales (DL)	Album
"Fascination of Samba" (삼바의 매력)	2007	—N/a	—N/a	Infinity Challenge Gangbyeon Road Concert
"Grasshopper World" (메뚜기월드)	2013	4	KOR: 507,817+	Park Myung-soo's How About This?
"Hapjeong Station Exit 5" (합정역 5번 출구) as Yoo San-seul	2019	99	—N/a*	Hangout with Yoo "Bbong For Yoo"
"Redevelopment of Love" (사랑의 재개발) as Yoo San-seul	2019	89	—N/a*	Hangout with Yoo "Bbong For Yoo"
"Redevelopment of Love 2" (사랑의 재개발 2) as Yoo San-seul	2020	—	—N/a*	Redevelopment of Love 2
"Luv Us" (두리쥬와) as U-Doragon; feat. S.B.N	2020	18	—N/a*	Luv Us X Linda X Exciting
"—" denotes releases that did not chart or were not released in that region. * Gaon stopped releasing download sales numbers in January 2018.

==== Collaborations ====
Title	Year	Peak chart positions	Sales (DL)	Album
Title	Year	KOR	Sales (DL)	Album
"All You Need Is Love" with Infinite Challenge	2006	—N/a	—N/a	Non-album single
"If I Do It or Not" (하나마나송) with Noh Hong-chul	2007	—N/a	—N/a	Non-album single
"The Family's Day" (패밀리의 하루) with Family Outing members	2009	—N/a	—N/a	Non-album single
"Let's Dance" with Tiger JK & Yoon Mi-rae	2009	—N/a	—N/a	Olympic Expressway Music Festival
"Apgujeong Nallari" (압구정 날라리) with Lee Juck	2011	2	KOR: 3,081,488+	Infinite Challenge West Coast Highway Festival
"As I Say" (말하는 대로) with Lee Juck	2011	5	KOR: 1,857,332+	Infinite Challenge West Coast Highway Festival
"Heat Stroked Seagull" (더위 먹은 갈매기) with Song Eun-yi, Kim Sook	2012	5	KOR: 901,799+	I'm A Singer In My Own Right
"Room Nallari" (방구석 날라리) with Lee Juck	2012	5	KOR: 1,041,308+	Non-album single
"Please Don't Go My Girl with You Hee-yeol, Kim Jo-han	2013	3	KOR: 616,693+	Infinite Challenge - Jayu-ro Song Festival
"Dance King" (댄스왕) with You Hee-yeol	2013	27	KOR: 87,293+	Infinite Challenge - Jayu-ro Song Festival
"Yes, We are Together" (그래, 우리 함께) with Infinite Challenge	2013	5	KOR: 616,693+	Infinite Challenge - Jayu-ro Song Festival
"I'm So Sexy" with Park Jin-young	2015	5	KOR: 851,957+	Infinite Challenge Yeongdong Highway Music Festival
"Dancing King" with Exo	2016	2	KOR: 648,506+	SM Station Season 1
"Like" (처럼) with Dok2 feat. Lee Hi	2016	7	KOR: 309,578+	Infinite Challenge Great Legacy
"Hollywood" with Haha	2019	—	—N/a*	Running Man Fan-meeting: Project Running 9
"Confession, Come Out Now" (이제 나와라 고백) with Soran and Jeon So-min	2019	—	—N/a*	Running Man Fan-meeting: Project Running 9
"I Like It" (좋아) with Running Man members	2019	—	—N/a*	Running Man Fan-meeting: Project Running 9
"Farewell Bus Stop" (이별의 버스 정류장) as Yoo San-seul; with Song Ga-in	2020	114	—N/a*	Farewell Bus Stop
"As I Say (2020 Live Ver.)" (말하는 대로 (2020 Live Ver.)) with Lee Juck	2020	—	—N/a*	Hangout with Yoo "Indoor Concert"
"In Summer (Covered By SSAK3)" (여름 안에서 (Covered By 싹쓰리)) with Lee Hyo-ri and Rain; feat. Hwang Kwang-hee	2020	3	—N/a*	Hangout with Yoo "SSAK3"
"Beach Again" (다시 여기 바닷가) with Lee Hyo-ri and Rain	2020	1	—N/a*	Hangout with Yoo "SSAK3"
"Play That Summer" (그 여름을 틀어줘) with Lee Hyo-ri and Rain	2020	2	—N/a*	Hangout with Yoo "SSAK3"
"—" denotes releases that did not chart or were not released in that region. * Gaon stopped releasing download sales numbers in January 2018.

==== As featured artist ====
Title	Year	Peak chart positions	Sales (DL)	Album
Title	Year	KOR	Sales (DL)	Album
"Again" (다시) Turbo feat. Yoo Jae-suk	2015	1	KOR: 388,142+	Again
"—" denotes releases that did not chart or were not released in that region. * Gaon stopped releasing download sales numbers in January 2018.

=== Music credits ===
Music credits adapted from the Korea Music Copyright Association. As of 23 December 2019.

Year	Artist	Song	Album	Lyrics		Music	
Year	Artist	Song	Album	Credited	With	Credited	With
2011	Yoo Jae-suk, Lee Juck (Sagging Snail)	"As I Say" (말하는 대로)	Infinite Challenge West Coast Highway Festival	Yes	Lee Juck	No	—N/a
2011	Yoo Jae-suk, Lee Juck (Sagging Snail)	"Apgujeong Nallari" (압구정 날라리)	Infinite Challenge West Coast Highway Festival	Yes	Lee Juck	No	—N/a
2012	Yoo Jae-suk, Lee Juck (Sagging Snail)	"Room Nallari" (방구석 날라리)	Non-album single	Yes	Lee Juck	No	—N/a
2013	Yoo Jae-suk, Yoo Hee-Yeol Feat. Kim Johan (How Do You Dool)	"Please Don't Go My Girl"	Infinite Challenge - Jayu-ro Song Festival	Yes	Yoo Hee-Yeol	No	—N/a
2013	Yoo Jae-suk, Yoo Hee-Yeol (How Do You Dool)	"Dance King" (댄스왕)	Infinite Challenge - Jayu-ro Song Festival	Yes	Yoo Hee-Yeol, TEXU	No	—N/a
2013	Infinite Challenge members	"Yes, We are Together" (그래, 우리 함께)	Infinite Challenge - Jayu-ro Song Festival	Yes	Yoo Hee-Yeol, Infinite Challenge members	No	—N/a
2019	Running Man members	"I Like It" (좋아)	Running Man Fan-meeting: Project Running 9	Yes	Jung Joon-il, Running Man members	No	—N/a
2019	UV, Urban Zakapa	THIS IS MUSIC	Hangout with Yoo "Yoo-plash"	No	—N/a	Yes	Yoo Jun-sung, Yoo Se-yoon, Muzie, Jo Hyun-ah, MO'I
2019	So!YoON!, Sumin	"Please Distress Me + It's Not That I Can't" (날 괴롭혀줘 + 못한 게 아니고)	Hangout with Yoo "Yoo-plash"	No	—N/a	Yes	Sunwoo Jung-a, Yoon Suk-Chul, Lee Sang-min, Han Sang-won, DOCSKIM, So!YoON!, Sumin
2019	Boi B, Gaeko, Choiza, Geegooin, Gray, Crush, Wonstein, Mommy Son, Zior Park, Sam Kim	"How Do You Play?" (놀면 뭐해?)	Hangout with Yoo "Yoo-plash"	No	—N/a	Yes	Yoo Hee-Yeol, Yoon Sang, Lee Sang-soon, Jukjae, GRAY, Crush, Sam Kim
2019	Paul Kim, Heize, Peakboy	"Tic Tac Toe" (눈치)	Hangout with Yoo "Yoo-plash"	No	—N/a	Yes	Lee Juck, Sunwoo Jung-a, Jeong Dong-hwan, Paul Kim, Heize, Peakboy, Yang Hye-seung, Hong Joon-ho, Lee Tae-yun
2019	Zion.T, Colde	"Confused" (헷갈려)	Hangout with Yoo "Yoo-plash"	No	—N/a	Yes	Yoo Hee-Yeol, Yoon Sang, Lee Sang-soon, Jukjae, Colde
2019	Yoo San-seul	"Hapjeong Station Exit 5" (합정역 5번 출구)	Hangout with Yoo "Bbong for Yoo"	Yes	Lee Geon-woo	No	—N/a
