= The Pointer Sisters discography =

- Studio albums: 15
- Soundtrack albums: 1
- Live albums: 3
- Compilation albums: 11
- Singles: 51

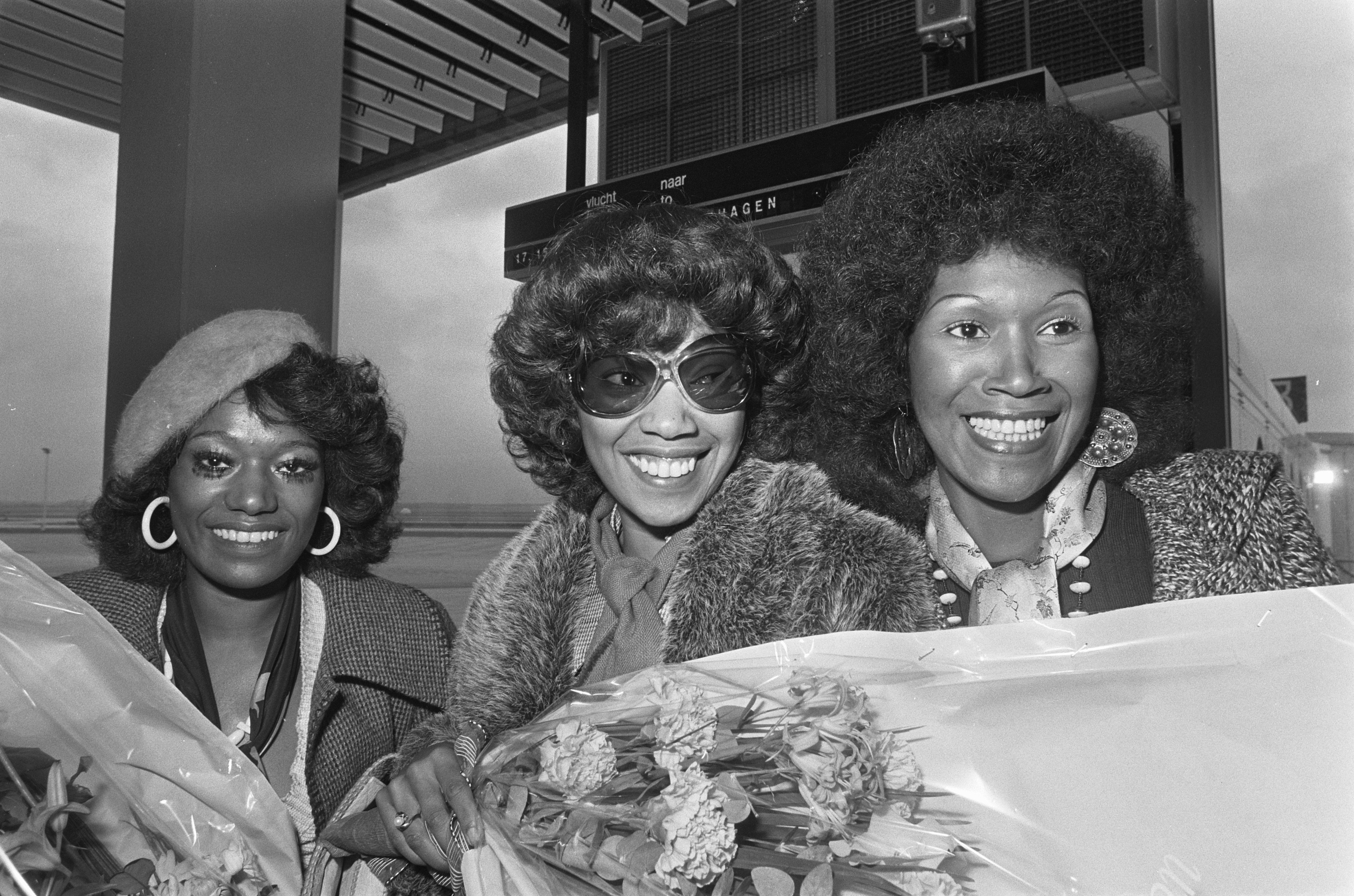
The Pointer Sisters

This is the discography of American R&B/soul/pop vocal group The Pointer Sisters. The group charted 16 songs in the top 40 of the Billboard Hot 100 and 27 on the chart overall, along with 30 on Billboard's Hot Soul/Black/R&B Singles chart. Thirteen of those singles reached the top 20 on the US Hot 100, with seven of those singles hitting the top 10.

== Albums ==
=== Studio albums ===
Year	Album	Peak chart positions							Certifications	Record label
Year	Album	US	US R&B	AUS	CAN	NL	NZ	UK	Certifications	Record label
1973	The Pointer Sisters	13	3	—	8	—	—	—	RIAA: Gold	Blue Thumb
1974	That's a Plenty	82	33	79	—	—	—	—	RIAA: Gold	Blue Thumb
1975	Steppin'	22	3	—	44	—	—	—		ABC/Blue Thumb
1977	Having a Party	176	51	—	—	—	—	—		ABC/Blue Thumb
1978	Energy	13	9	21	9	1	38	—	RIAA: Gold; MC: Platinum; NVPI: Platinum	Planet
1979	Priority	72	44	61	91	—	—	—		Planet
1980	Special Things	34	19	67	—	—	—	—		Planet
1981	Black & White	12	9	15	41	39	10	21	RIAA: Gold	Planet
1982	So Excited!	59	24	—	—	—	—	—		Planet
1983	Break Out	8	6	17	4	15	6	9	RIAA: 3× Platinum; BPI: Gold; MC: 4× Platinum; RMNZ: Gold	Planet
1985	Contact	25	11	17	14	37	36	34	RIAA: Platinum; MC: Platinum	RCA
1986	Hot Together	48	39	100	58	—	—	—		RCA
1988	Serious Slammin'	152	—	—	78	—	—	—		RCA
1990	Right Rhythm	—	—	—	—	—	—	—		Motown
1993	Only Sisters Can Do That	—	—	—	—	—	—	—		SBK
"—" denotes a recording that did not chart or was not released in that territory.

=== Live albums ===
Year	Album	Peak chart positions		Record label
Year	Album	US	US R&B	Record label
1974	Live at the Opera House	96	29	Blue Thumb
2004	The Pointer Sisters Live in Billings	—	—	Madacy
2006	Natalia Meets the Pointer Sisters	—	—	Sony BMG
"—" denotes a recording that did not chart or was not released in that territory.

=== Soundtrack albums ===
- Highlights from Ain't Misbehavin': The New Cast Recording (1996, RCA Victor)

=== Compilation albums ===
Year	Album	Peak chart positions					Certifications	Record label
Year	Album	US	US R&B	AUS	NL	UK	Certifications	Record label
1976	The Best of the Pointer Sisters	164	33	—	—	—		ABC/Blue Thumb
1981	Retrospect	—	—	—	—	—		MCA
1982	Pointer Sisters' Greatest Hits	178	—	11	—	—		Planet
1989	Greatest Hits	—	—	—	—	—		RCA
1989	Jump – The Best of the Pointer Sisters	—	—	—	50	11	BPI: Gold	RCA
1995	Greatest Hits	—	—	100	—	—		RCA
1996	Fire: The Very Best of the Pointer Sisters	—	—	—	—	—		RCA
1997	Yes We Can Can: The Best of the Blue Thumb Recordings	—	—	—	—	—		Hip-O
2000	The Best of the Pointer Sisters	—	—	—	—	—		RCA
2004	Platinum & Gold Collection	—	—	—	—	—		RCA
2004	The Millennium Collection: The Best of the Pointer Sisters	—	—	—	—	—		Hip-O
2009	Playlist: The Very Best of the Pointer Sisters	—	—	—	—	—		Legacy
2010	Goldmine: The Best of the Pointer Sisters	—	—	—	—	—		Sony Music
"—" denotes a recording that did not chart or was not released in that territory.

== Singles ==
Year	Single	Peak chart positions										Certifications	Album
Year	Single	US	US R&B	US A/C	US Dan	AUS	CAN	IRE	NL	NZ	UK	Certifications	Album
1971	"Don't Try to Take the Fifth"	—	—	—	—	—	—	—	—	—	—		—N/a
1972	"Destination No More Heartaches" / "Send Him Back"	—	—	—	—	—	—	—	—	—	—		—N/a
1973	"Yes We Can Can"	11	12	—	—	86	33	—	25	—	—		The Pointer Sisters
1973	"Wang Dang Doodle"	61	24	—	—	—	62	—	—	—	—		The Pointer Sisters
1974	"Steam Heat"	108	—	—	—	—	90	—	—	—	—		That's a Plenty
1974	"Love in Them There Hills"	—	—	—	—	—	—	—	—	—	—		That's a Plenty
1974	"Fairytale" ^{[A]}	13	—	13	—	30	42	—	—	—	—		That's a Plenty
1974	"Let It Be Me"	—	—	—	—	—	—	—	—	—	—		Live at the Opera House
1975	"Live Your Life Before You Die"	89	—	31	—	—	—	—	—	—	—		—N/a
1975	"How Long (Betcha' Got a Chick on the Side)"	20	1	—	—	—	31	—	—	—	—		Steppin'
1975	"Going Down Slowly"	61	16	—	—	—	71	—	—	—	—		Steppin'
1976	"You Gotta Believe"	103	14	—	—	—	—	—	—	—	—		Car Wash
1977	"Having a Party"	—	62	—	—	—	—	—	—	—	—		Having a Party
1977	"I Need a Man"	—	—	—	—	—	—	—	—	—	—		Having a Party
1978	"Fire"	2	14	21	—	7	3	—	1	1	34	RIAA: Gold	Energy
1979	"Everybody Is a Star"	—	—	—	—	—	—	—	—	—	61		Energy
1979	"Happiness"	30	20	—	18	—	34	—	11	33	—		Energy
1979	"Blind Faith"	107	—	—	—	—	—	—	—	—	—		Priority
1979	"Who Do You Love"	106	—	—	—	—	—	—	—	—	—		Priority
1980	"He's So Shy"	3	10	13	26	11	14	—	14	1	—	RIAA: Gold	Special Things
1980	"Could I Be Dreaming"	52	22	—	26	—	—	—	—	37	—		Special Things
1980	"We've Got the Power"	—	—	—	26	—	—	—	—	—	—		Special Things
1980	"Where Did the Time Go"	—	—	—	—	—	—	—	—	—	—		Special Things
1981	"Slow Hand"	2	7	6	—	5	10	2	33	6	10	RIAA: Gold	Black & White
1981	"What a Surprise"	—	52	—	—	—	—	—	—	—	—		Black & White
1981	"Sweet Lover Man"	—	—	—	—	—	—	—	—	—	—		Black & White
1982	"Should I Do It"	13	—	19	—	16	37	—	12	22	50		Black & White
1982	"American Music"	16	23	9	—	78	28	—	44	—	—		So Excited!
1982	"I'm So Excited"	30	46	—	28	9	—	—	—	—	—		So Excited!
1983	"If You Wanna Get Back Your Lady"	67	44	—	48	—	—	—	23	—	—		So Excited!
1983	"I Need You"	48	13	15	2	—	—	12	—	—	25		Break Out
1984	"Automatic"	5	2	36	2	15	17	1	9	8	2	BPI: Silver	Break Out
1984	"Jump (For My Love)"	3	3	11	8	8	8	2	9	3	6	BPI: Silver; MC: Gold	Break Out
1984	"I'm So Excited" (remix)	9	—	25	—	—	21	6	19	29	11	BPI: Platinum	Break Out
1984	"Neutron Dance"	6	13	23	4	4	1	14	21	17	31	MC: Gold	Break Out
1985	"Baby Come and Get It"	44	24	—	8	29	45	—	—	—	76		Break Out
1985	"Dare Me"	11	6	32	1	10	20	7	45	27	17		Contact
1985	"Freedom"	59	25	16	—	—	82	—	—	—	—		Contact
1986	"Twist My Arm"	83	61	—	15	—	—	—	—	—	—		Contact
1986	"Back in My Arms"	—	—	—	—	—	—	—	—	—	—		Contact
1986	"Goldmine" /	33	17	27	7	79	44	—	—	—	78		Hot Together
1986	"Sexual Power"	—	—	—	7	—	—	—	—	—	—		Hot Together
1987	"All I Know Is the Way I Feel"	93	69	36	—	—	—	—	—	—	—		Hot Together
1987	"Mercury Rising"	—	49	—	—	—	—	—	—	—	—		Hot Together
1987	"Be There"	42	—	—	—	—	63	—	—	—	78		Beverly Hills Cop II
1988	"He Turned Me Out"	—	39	—	37	—	—	—	—	—	—		Serious Slammin'
1988	"I'm in Love"	—	67	36	—	—	—	—	—	—	—		Serious Slammin'
1988	"Power of Persuasion"	—	—	—	—	—	—	—	—	—	—		Caddyshack II
1990	"Friends' Advice (Don't Take It)"	—	36	—	—	—	—	—	—	—	97		Right Rhythm
1990	"After You"	—	—	—	—	—	—	—	—	—	—		Right Rhythm
1990	"Insanity"	—	62	—	11	—	—	—	—	—	—		Right Rhythm
1993	"Don't Walk Away"	—	—	—	—	—	—	—	—	—	—		Only Sisters Can Do That
2005	"Sisters Are Doing It for Themselves" (with Natalia)	—	—	—	—	—	—	—	—	—	—		—N/a
2005	"Christmas in New York"	—	—	21	—	—	—	—	—	—	—		—N/a
2020	"Feels Like June"	—	—	—	—	—	—	—	—	—	—		—N/a
2022	"Automatic" (Nu Disco Mix) (Sean Finn, Lotus, and the Pointer Sisters)	—	—	—	—	—	—	—	—	—	—		—N/a
"—" denotes a recording that did not chart or was not released in that territory.

Notes

- ^{A} "Fairytale" also peaked at #37 on the Hot Country Singles chart.

=== As featured artists ===
Year	Single	Peaks
Year	Single	US
1974	"Little Red Hen" (Taj Mahal featuring The Pointer Sisters)	—
1985	"We Are the World" (as part of USA for Africa)	1
1991	"Voices That Care" (with various artists)	11

2018 "You Gotta Believe" (Audio in animated film by Nina Paley)

=== Music videos ===
Year	Video	Director
1978	"Fire"	
1979	"Everybody Is a Star"	
1980	"He's So Shy"	
1980	"Could I Be Dreaming"	
1981	"Slow Hand"	
1981	"Should I Do It"	
1982	"I'm So Excited"	
1984	"Automatic"	
1984	"Jump (For My Love)"	
1984	"Neutron Dance"	
1985	"We Are the World" (as part of USA for Africa)	
1985	"Baby Come and Get It"	
1985	"Dare Me"	
1985	"Freedom"	
1986	"Twist My Arm"	
1986	"Back in My Arms"	
1986	"Goldmine"	
1988	"He Turned Me Out"	
1990	"Friends' Advice (Don't Take It)"	
1990	"After You"	
1991	"Voices That Care" (with various artists)	David S. Jackson
1993	"Don't Walk Away"	
2005	"Sisters Are Doing It for Themselves" (with Natalia)	
2005	"Christmas in New York" (version 1)	
2005	"Christmas in New York" (version 2)	

== Other appearances ==
Year	Song	Album
1984	"Emotion"	Emotion (Barbra Streisand album)
1985	"Just a Little Closer"	We Are the World
1985	"All Systems Go"	Perfect
1987	"Respect Yourself"	The Return of Bruno (album)
1987	"Santa Claus Is Coming to Town"	A Very Special Christmas
1988	"He Turned Me Out"	Action Jackson
1989	"Summer in the City"	The Karate Kid Part III
1991	"Nine Lives"	Garfield: Am I Cool or What?
1994	"Chain of Fools" with Clint Black	Rhythm, Country and Blues
1996	"Yo-Ho (A Pirate's Life for Me)"	Disney's Music from the Park
1996	"You Got Me Hummin'"	Two If by Sea
