= Right Rhythm =

Studio album by Pointer Sisters
- Released: June 12, 1990
- Recorded: 1989–1990
- Genre: R&B
- Label: Motown
- Producer: James Anthony Carmichael, Levi Seacer Jr., Marti Sharron

Pointer Sisters chronology
Serious Slammin' (1988)	Right Rhythm (1990)	Only Sisters Can Do That (1993)

Singles from Right Rhythm
- 1. "Friends' Advice (Don't Take It)" Released: 1990; 2. "After You" Released: 1990; 3. "Insanity" Released: 1990

Professional ratings
Review scores
Source	Rating
AllMusic	2/5 stars
Chicago Tribune	3/4 stars
Entertainment Weekly	(favorable)
Orlando Sentinel	3/5 stars
Select	1/5 medals
Journal Tribune	3/5 stars

Right Rhythm is the fourteenth studio album by the Pointer Sisters, released by the Motown label on June 12, 1990.

== History ==
In 1978, the Pointer Sisters had begun an eleven-year association with Richard Perry – first through his Planet Records label and subsequently with RCA Records – with the group amassing a total of eleven Top 40 hits. The sisters' 1983 multi-platinum album release, Break Out was parent to four Top Ten hits including "I'm So Excited" – introduced on the 1982 album So Excited! but remixed and added to later pressings of Break Out. The career climax achieved there was followed by a decline in popularity and in 1988 the Pointer Sisters ended their contract with RCA, blaming their decline on that label's supposedly bad promotion.

It was reported in March 1989 that the Pointer Sisters were negotiating with Motown. The label had passed on the group when they'd sought their first record deal in 1971, though sister and original member Bonnie Pointer left the group for a solo career with Motown in 1977. The group signed with Motown in May 1989, with June Pointer then stating: "We want to help Motown get back up where it was", referencing the label's own faded fortunes.

Ultimately, the album neither revived the Pointer Sisters' faltering career nor fixed Motown's financial difficulties. The label released Right Rhythm in the summer of 1990 following the May 1990 issue of the advance single "Friends' Advice". That single was a relative failure, only reaching #36 on the Billboard R&B charts. The second single, a ballad called "After You", also failed to find a widespread audience. A third single, a remixed version of "Insanity", managed a #62 R&B peak (Note: 1. 11 on the Billboard dance charts). With Motown suffering from continued management turmoil, Right Rhythm failed to dent either the Billboard 200 or the R&B albums chart. By mutual agreement, Motown did not renew the sisters' contract.

"Billy Said Yes" featured background vocals by Issa Pointer, the daughter of Ruth Pointer: Issa would replace June in the group's membership in 2002.

== Track listing ==
No.	Title	Writer(s)	Length
1.	"Friends' Advice (Don't Take It)"	Donald Robinson, Tina Harris	4:04
2.	"Man with the Right Rhythm"	Anita Pointer, Charles Kelly	4:51
3.	"Real Life"	Kurt Farquhar, Paul Chiten	4:09
4.	"After You"	Deborah Thomas, Terry Shaddick	4:30
5.	"You Knocked the Love (Right Outta My Heart)"	Fritz Cadet, Millie Jackson, Timmy Allen	4:47
6.	"Billy Said Yes"	Brenda Blonski, John Patterson, Morris "Butch" Stewart	3:49
7.	"Insanity"	Danny Sembello, Marti Sharron	3:57
8.	"What a Woman Wants"	Henry Gaffney	4:21
9.	"Where Have You Been?"	Anita Pointer, David Harvey, June Pointer, Sami McKinney	4:55
10.	"(We Just Wanna) Thank You"		3:25

== Personnel ==
=== The Pointer Sisters ===
- Anita Pointer – vocals
- June Pointer – vocals
- Ruth Pointer – vocals

=== Musicians ===
- Levi Seacer, Jr. – all instruments (1, 2, 3, 5, 6, 10), rhythm arrangements (2)
- John Barnes – keyboards (4, 8), synthesizers (4, 8, 9)
- James Anthony Carmichael – keyboards (4, 8, 9)
- Lloyd Tolbert – keyboards (4, 8, 9)
- Khris Kellow – keyboards (7)
- Ralph Hawkins – synth solo (7)
- Steve Lindsey – keyboards (7), arrangements (7)
- Orpheus – keyboard and drum programming (7)
- Danny Sembello – keyboard programming (7), arrangements (7)
- Marti Shannon – keyboards (7), arrangements (7)
- Robbie Buchanan – additional synthesizers (8)
- Paul Jackson Jr. – guitars (4, 7, 8, 9)
- David Cochran – guitars (8), bass (8)
- Freddie Washington – bass (4, 9)
- John Robinson – drums (4, 8, 9)
- Paulinho da Costa – percussion (4, 8, 9)
- Eric Leads – horns (5)
- Sheldon Reynolds – rhythm arrangements (2)
- Niki Haris – vocal arrangements (7)
- Henry Gaffney – vocal arrangements (8)
- Issa Pointer – French rap (6)

== Production ==
- Producers – Levi Seacer, Jr. (Tracks 1, 2, 3, 5, 6 & 10); James Anthony Carmichael (Tracks 4, 8 & 9); Marti Sharron (Track 7).
- Associate Producer on Track 7 – Danny Sembello
- Executive Producers – Debbie Sandridge and The Pointer Sisters.
- Engineers – Dave Friedlander (Tracks 1, 2, 3, 5, 6 & 10); Calvin Harris (Tracks 4, 8 & 9); Bob Biles, Craig Burbidge, Fletcher Dobrocke and Val Garay (Track 7).
- Assistant Engineers – Craig Doubet and Tim Penn (Tracks 1, 2, 3, 5, 6 & 10); Mark Hagen (Tracks 4, 8 & 9); Eric Annest, Gregg Barrett, Lawrence Ethan, Steve Heinke, Mike Scotella, Gary Skardina and Jeff Welch (Track 7).
- Recorded at Paisley Park Studios (Chanhassen, MN); Scream Studios (Studio City, CA); Westlake Studios, Music Grinder, Studio 55, Ignition Studios and Steve Lindsey Studio (Los Angeles, CA); Cal Harris Studios (Woodland Hills, CA); Aire LA (Glendale, CA).
- Mixing – Goh Hotoda and Shep Pettibone (Track 1); Dave Friedlander and Levi Seacer, Jr. (Tracks 2, 3, 5, 6 & 10); Calvin Harris (Tracks 4, 8 & 9); Chris Lord-Alge (Track 7).
- Mixed at Axis Studios and Soundworks (New York, NY); Paisley Park Studios; Westlake Studios; The Grey Room (Los Angeles, CA).
- Mastered by Chris Bellman at Bernie Grundman Mastering (Hollywood, CA).
- Project Assistant – Gayle Woodard
- Art Direction – Stephen Meltzer
- Design – Julie Moss
- Photography – Paul Jasmin
- Management – Gallin Morey Associates
