= Hot Together =

Studio album by The Pointer Sisters
- Released: October 23, 1986
- Recorded: 1986
- Studios: Unique Recording Studios, New York City
- Genre: R&B
- Length: 42:26
- Label: RCA Records
- Producer: Richard Perry

The Pointer Sisters chronology
Contact (1985)	Hot Together (1986)	Serious Slammin' (1988)

Singles from Hot Together
- 1. "Hot Together" Released: 1986; 2. "All I Know Is the Way I Feel" Released: 1986; 3. "Mercury Rising" Released: 1986

Professional ratings
Review scores
Source	Rating
AllMusic	2/5 stars

Hot Together is the twelfth studio album by the Pointer Sisters released in October 1986 by RCA Records.

== History ==
The eighth of the group's nine collaborations with producer Richard Perry, Hot Together represented a downturn in the Pointer Sisters' fortunes. The lead single, "Goldmine", charted well on Billboard's R&B and dance charts but only reached #33 on the Hot 100. A second single, the ballad "All I Know Is the Way I Feel", reached #93 on the Hot 100. A third release, "Mercury Rising", only managed an appearance on Billboard's R&B chart.

The album's title track is more well-known, having been included in the soundtrack for the Mel Brooks 1987 film Spaceballs and the Richard Dreyfuss 1987 film Stakeout; it was also used in advertisements for the 1987 NBA playoffs. The song was prominently featured in the second trailer for the 2026 video game Grand Theft Auto VI, leading to a 182,000% surge in streams on Spotify.

Other songs of note include "Set Me Free" (co-written by "Neutron Dance" scribe Allee Willis and featured in the opening scene of Whoopi Goldberg's 1986 film Jumpin' Jack Flash) and "My Life" (co-written by actress/comedian Sandra Bernhard). The album was remastered and issued on CD, with bonus tracks, in 2011 by Big Break Records.

== Track listing ==
Side one
No.	Title	Writer(s)	Length
1.	"My Life"	Adele Bertei, David Paul Bryant, Sandra Bernhard	4:14
2.	"Mercury Rising"	Andy Goldmark, Bruce Roberts	4:34
3.	"Goldmine"	Goldmark, Roberts	3:51
4.	"All I Know Is the Way I Feel"	Jerry Ragovoy, Estelle Levitt	4:42
5.	"Say the Word"	Marti Sharron, Glen Ballard, Chuck Wild	3:39

Side two
No.	Title	Writer(s)	Length
6.	"Hot Together"	Sharon Robinson	4:11
7.	"Sexual Power"	Dan E. Williams, Michael D. Stewart	3:44
8.	"Set Me Free"	Allee Willis, Danny Sembello, Cynthia Weil	4:50
9.	"Taste"	David Swanson, Siedah Garrett	4:57
10.	"Eyes Don't Lie"	Ballard, Garrett	3:38

2011 remastered bonus tracks
No.	Title	Length
11.	"Goldmine" (12" Remix)	6:32
12.	"All I Know Is the Way I Feel" (Single Remix)	4:09
13.	"Mercury Rising" (Single Remix)	4:13
14.	"My Life" (Remix)	4:51
15.	"Translation"	4:29
16.	"Mercury Rising" (12" Remix)	6:28

== Personnel ==
The Pointer Sisters

- Ruth Pointer – lead vocals (1, 2, 8, 9), backing vocals
- June Pointer – lead vocals (3, 4, 6, 9), backing vocals
- Anita Pointer – lead vocals (5, 7, 9, 10), backing vocals

Musicians

- David P. Bryant – synthesizers (1), drum machine (1)
- Paul Fox – synthesizers (1, 2, 5, 9, 10), drum machine (1, 5, 9, 10), additional synthesizers (3, 4, 8), synth solo (6), horn arrangements (5), tom tom (6)
- Andy Goldmark – synthesizers (2, 3), drum machine programming (2, 3), arrangements (3)
- Bobby Khozouri – synthesizers (2), drum machine programming (2), additional synthesizers (3)
- Fred Zarr – synthesizers (2)
- Billy Cobin – additional synthesizers (2, 3), drum machine programming (2)
- Jerry Ragovoy – acoustic piano (4), synthesizers (4), drum machine (4)
- Glen Ballard – synthesizers (5, 10), drum machine (5, 10)
- Chuck Wild – synthesizers (5, 10), drum machine (5, 10), additional synthesizers (9), synth solo (9)
- Rick Chudacoff – synthesizers (6), arrangements (6)
- Bill Cuomo – synthesizers (6)
- Sharon Robinson – synthesizers (6), arrangements (6)
- Mike Lawler – synthesizers (7)
- Jeff Lorber – additional synthesizers (7), drum machine (7)
- Danny Sembello – synthesizers (8), drum machine (8)
- Danny Ironstone – additional synthesizers (8)
- Allee Willis – synthesizers (8), drum machine (8), arrangements (8)
- John Van Tongeren – additional synthesizers (10)
- Paul Jackson Jr. – guitars (1−4, 6, 9)
- Paul Pesco – guitars (2, 3)
- Howie Rice – guitars (3), additional synthesizers (7, 9)
- Dennis Herring – lead guitar (4, 9), guitars (5)
- Jimmy English – guitars (7)
- Robbie Nevil – lead guitar (7)
- Larry Treadwell – guitars (8)
- Nathan East – bass guitar (3)
- Bruce Roberts – drum machine programming (2)
- Merv De Peyer – drum machine (4)
- Peter Bunetta – drum machine (6), arrangements (6)
- Dennis Holt – drum machine (7)
- Paulinho da Costa – percussion (1, 2, 3, 5, 6)
- Jimmy Maelen – percussion (2)
- Lenny Castro – percussion (10)

=== Production ===
- Producer – Richard Perry
- Associate Producers – David P. Bryant (Track 1); Paul Fox (Tracks 1, 5, 9 & 10); Andy Goldmark (Tracks 2 & 3); Bruce Roberts (Tracks 2 & 3); Jerry Ragovoy (Track 4); Glen Ballard (Tracks 5 & 10); Chuck Wild (Tracks 5 & 10); Peter Bunetta and Rick Chudacoff (Track 6); Michael D. Stewart and Dan E. Williams (Track 7); Allee Willis (Track 8);
- A&R Coordinator – Marge Meoli
- Production Coordinator – Bradford Rosenberger
- Recording Engineer – Michael Brooks
- Basic Track Recording – Frances Buckley (Tracks 1 & 9); Hugo Dwyer (Track 4); Mick Guzauski (Track 6); Randy Holland (Track 7); Danny Sembello (Track 8).
- Second Engineer – Jay Willis
- Additional Engineering – Frances Buckley, Glen Holguin, Steve Peck and Jay Willis.
- Assistant Engineers – David Dubow, Glen Holguin, Kraig Miller, Barbara Milne, Rich Slater and Glenn Walker.
- Recorded at Studio 55, Conway Studios and Music Grinder (Los Angeles, CA); Unique Recording Studios and Counterpoint Recording Studios (New York, NY).
- Remixed by Bill Bottrell at Studio 55.
- Mastered by Stephen Marcussen at Precision Lacquer (Hollywood, CA).
- Alet Direction and Design – John Kosh and Ron Larson
- Photography – Randee St. Nicholas
- Management – Gallin Morrey Associates

== Charts ==
Chart performance for Hot Together
Chart (1986)	Peak position
Australian Albums (Kent Music Report)	100
Swedish Albums (Sverigetopplistan)	20
US Billboard 200	48
US Billboard Top Black Albums	39
