= Having a Party (Pointer Sisters album) =

Studio album by Pointer Sisters
- Released: October 24, 1977
- Studios: The Village Recorder (Los Angeles, California); Wally Heider Studios (San Francisco, California)
- Genres: R&B, soul, funk
- Length: 35:26
- Label: ABC/Blue Thumb
- Producers: David Rubinson & Friends, Inc.

Pointer Sisters chronology
| The Best of the Pointer Sisters (1976) | Having a Party (1977) | Energy (1978) |

Professional ratings
Review scores
| Source | Rating |
|---|---|
| AllMusic | 3/5 stars |
| The Virgin Encyclopedia of R&B and Soul | 2/5 stars |

Having a Party is the fourth studio album by American family vocal group the Pointer Sisters, released in 1977 on the ABC/Blue Thumb label.

== History ==
It was a series of lasts for the group in many ways. With youngest member June retiring from the group for a brief time, the remaining members of Bonnie, Anita, and Ruth recorded the album, with June only appearing on the title song with her sisters (a cover of Sam Cooke's hit). As it turned out, it would be the last album to feature David Rubinson as their producer, and the last album the group recorded for Blue Thumb Records. With June contributing no lead vocal songs to the album as she had retired from the group, and the album selling modestly, Blue Thumb dropped the group from the roster. Bonnie then left the group and began a solo career, making this the last Pointer Sisters album to feature Bonnie. Upon June's return to the group, the Pointer Sisters would be offered a new recording contract with Planet Records and would find even greater success as a trio.

Having a Party was remastered and issued on CD in 2006 by Hip-O Select.

== Track listing ==
Side one
| No. | Title | Writer(s) | Length |
|---|---|---|---|
| 1. | "Having a Party" | Sam Cooke | 4:34 |
| 2. | "Don't It Drive You Crazy" | Ted Ashford | 6:14 |
| 3. | "I Need a Man" | David Rubinson, Bruce Good, Jeffrey Cohen, Anita Pointer, Bonnie Pointer, June Pointer | 5:42 |

Side two
| No. | Title | Writer(s) | Length |
|---|---|---|---|
| 4. | "Waiting on You" | Melvin Ragin, Ruth Pointer | 3:34 |
| 5. | "I'll Get by Without You" | Ragin, B. Pointer, Don Grusin | 7:18 |
| 6. | "Bring Your Sweet Stuff Home to Me" | Stevie Wonder, A. Pointer, B. Pointer | 3:40 |
| 7. | "Lonely Gal" | A. Pointer, B. Pointer, R. Pointer | 4:24 |

== Personnel ==
The Pointer Sisters

- Anita Pointer, Ruth Pointer, Bonnie Pointer – vocals
- June Pointer – vocals on "Having a Party"

Musicians

- Reginald "Sonny" Burke, Stevie Wonder, Tom Salisbury – keyboards, synthesizers
- Wah Wah Watson, Ray Parker Jr., David T. Walker, Robert Bowles, Chris Michie – guitars
- Louis Johnson, Chuck Domanico, James Jamerson, Willie Weeks, Gene Santini – bass
- James Gadson, Ed Greene, Gaylord Birch – drums
- Kenneth Nash – percussion
- Andy Narell – steel drums
- Ernie Watts – saxophone solos
- Reginald "Sonny" Burke – string arrangements and conductor

=== Production ===
- David Rubinson & Friends, Inc. – producer
- Fred Catero, David Rubinson, Tim Kramer – engineers
- George Horn, Phil Brown – mastering engineers
- Earl Klasky – art direction
- Dave Bhang – album design
- Antonin Kratochvil – photography

== Charts ==
Chart performance for Having a Party
| Chart (1977) | Peak position |
|---|---|
| US Billboard Top LPs | 176 |
| US Billboard Top Soul LPs | 51 |
