= The Best of the Pointer Sisters =

Compilation album by The Pointer Sisters
- Released: November 1976
- Recorded: 1973–1976
- Genre: R&B; soul; funk
- Label: ABC Records; Blue Thumb Records
- Producer: David Rubinson & Friends, Inc.; Norman Whitfield

The Pointer Sisters chronology
Steppin' (1975)	The Best of the Pointer Sisters (1976)	Having a Party (1977)

The Best of the Pointer Sisters is the first compilation album released by The Pointer Sisters on the ABC/Blue Thumb record label in July 1976. It includes their biggest hits up to that point, such as "Yes We Can Can", "Fairytale", and "How Long". The album also included the new single "You Gotta Believe", which was produced by Norman Whitfield and featured in the 1976 film Car Wash and on its soundtrack.

Professional ratings
Review scores
Source	Rating
Christgau's Record Guide	B+

== Track listing ==
Side one
No.	Title	Writer(s)	Length
1.	"You Gotta Believe"	Norman Whitfield	2:44
2.	"Black Coffee"	Paul Francis Webster, Sonny Burke	6:04
3.	"Wang Dang Doodle"	Willie Dixon	2:42
4.	"Salt Peanuts"	Bruce Good, Jeffrey Cohen / Dizzy Gillespie, Kenny Clarke	5:10

Side two
No.	Title	Writer(s)	Length
5.	"Steam Heat"	Richard Adler, Jerry Ross	2:48
6.	"Cloudburst"	Leroy Kirkland, Jimmy Harris	3:10
7.	"Easy Days"	Isaac Hayes, Anita Pointer, Bonnie Pointer, June Pointer	3:33
8.	"Jada"	Pointer Sisters, Good	4:40
9.	"That's a Plenty" / "Surfeit, U.S.A." (medley)	Ray Gilbert, Lew Pollack / Good, Cohen	4:26

Side three
No.	Title	Writer(s)	Length
10.	"Little Pony"	Neal Hefti, Jon Hendricks, Dave Lambert	4:41
11.	"Sugar"	Pointer Sisters	2:19
12.	"Yes We Can Can"	Allen Toussaint	3:55
13.	"Sleeping Alone"	Stevie Wonder	4:00

Side four
No.	Title	Writer(s)	Length
14.	"Fairytale"	A. Pointer, B. Pointer	3:02
15.	"Shaky Flat Blues"	J. Pointer, A. Pointer, B. Pointer	4:41
16.	"Going Down Slowly"	Toussaint	3:11
17.	"How Long"	A. Pointer, J. Pointer, Ruth Pointer, David Rubinson	3:30

== Charts ==
Chart performance for The Best of the Pointer Sisters
Chart (1976)	Peak position
US Billboard Top LPs	164
US Billboard Top Soul LPs	33
