= Only Sisters Can Do That =

Studio album by the Pointer Sisters
- Released: November 16, 1993
- Recorded: 1993
- Genre: R&B, soul
- Length: 44:53
- Label: SBK
- Producer: Peter Wolf, Keith Forsey

The Pointer Sisters chronology
Right Rhythm (1990)	Only Sisters Can Do That (1993)	Highlights from Ain't Misbehavin': The New Cast Recording (1996)

Professional ratings
Review scores
Source	Rating
AllMusic	2/5 stars
Orlando Sentinel	2/5 stars

Only Sisters Can Do That is the fifteenth (and to date, final) studio album by the Pointer Sisters, released in 1993 on the SBK label.

== History ==
Only Sisters Can Do That is the last Pointer Sisters studio album made with founding member June Pointer. Issa Pointer, the daughter of longtime group member Ruth Pointer, performed as a background vocalist on two album tracks; she eventually replaced June Pointer in the group's lineup in 2002.

The album was helmed by producer Peter Wolf and led by the single "Don't Walk Away", which featured Michael McDonald as a guest vocalist. Originally, the track had been recorded by Ruth Pointer for a solo album that she abandoned in favor of the Only Sisters project. Other songs of note include "I Want Fireworks" and "Tell It to My Heart", which were both co-written by Anita Pointer, and the title track, penned by all three sisters.

The track "Feel for the Physical" appeared on the 1995 album Souled by Thomas Anders reworked as a duet by the Pointer Sisters and Anders. Despite critical accolades, the album proved to be a commercial disappointment as the Pointer Sisters were seen as unable to compete with younger and newer R&B acts like En Vogue. Although the group continued as a live act, they have recorded no further studio albums.

== Track listing ==
1. "It Ain't a Man's World" (Kim Eurisa, Clemard Harvey, Maya Angelou) – 4:27
2. "I Want Fireworks" (Anita Pointer, Ina Wolf, Peter Wolf) – 4:44
3. "Don't Walk Away" (Andy Hill, Peter Sinfield) – 4:49
4. "Eyes Like a Child" (Ina Wolf, Peter Wolf) – 4:45
5. "Only Sisters Can Do That" (June Pointer, Anita Pointer, Ruth Pointer, Sheldon Reynolds, Ina Wolf, Peter Wolf) – 3:54
6. "Feel for the Physical" (Peter Wolf, Peter Zizzo) – 4:02
7. "Tell It to My Heart" (Anita Pointer, Franne Golde, Allee Willis) – 5:10
8. "Vibe Time" (Peter Zizzo) – 4:03
9. "Lose Myself to Find Myself" (Keith Forsey, Steve Krikorian, Steve Schiff) – 4:45
10. "Sex, Love or Money" (S. Harry) – 4:14

== Personnel ==
The Pointer Sisters

- Anita Pointer – lead vocals (1, 2, 4, 5, 7–10), backing vocals
- June Pointer – lead vocals (4, 6, 9, 10), backing vocals
- Ruth Pointer – lead vocals (1, 3, 4, 5, 8, 9, 10), backing vocals
- All vocal arrangements by The Pointer Sisters.

Musicians

- Peter Wolf – all other instruments (1–8), backing vocals (5), additional keyboards (7), acoustic piano solo (8)
- Scott Frankfurt – pyrotechnic sounds (2), keyboards (7)
- Arthur Barrow – programming (9), bass (9)
- Steve Schiff – programming (9), guitars (9), arrangements (9)
- Sheldon Reynolds – guitars (1–5, 7, 8, 10)
- Benni Bilgeri – guitars (5)
- David Williams – guitars (6)
- Mark Schulman – drums (9)
- Rafael Padilla – percussion (1, 3, 4, 10)
- Everette Harp – alto sax solo (4, 7)
- Keith Forsey – arrangements (9)
- Issa Pointer – backing vocals (1, 6)
- Michael McDonald – lead and backing vocals (3)
- Thomas Anders – backing vocals (6)

== See also ==
- Thomas Anders – Souled (1995)
