= Priority (Pointer Sisters album) =

Studio album by Pointer Sisters
- Released: August 29, 1979
- Studio: Studio 55 (Los Angeles, California)
- Genre: R&B; rock; soul
- Label: Planet
- Producer: Richard Perry

Pointer Sisters chronology
Energy (1978)	Priority (1979)	Special Things (1980)

Singles from Priority
- 1. "Blind Faith" Released: 1979; 2. "Who Do You Love" Released: 1979

Priority is the sixth studio album by the Pointer Sisters, released in 1979 on the Planet label.

== History ==
Their second venture with producer Richard Perry, it was also their second venture into rock. The album peaked at number 72 on the Billboard 200 and reached number 44 on the R&B albums chart. Two singles were released, "Blind Faith" and "Who Do You Love". Both songs failed to reach the Billboard Hot 100. The album was remastered and issued on CD with a bonus track, "Nothin' But a Heartache", in 2009 by Wounded Bird Records.

== Critical reception ==
Professional ratings
Review scores
Source	Rating
AllMusic	3.5/5 stars
Smash Hits	mixed
The Virgin Encyclopedia of R&B and Soul	3/5 stars

The Green Bay Press-Gazette opined that "Ruth's range impresses," writing that "the instrumentation complements the Pointer Sisters' free-flying abilities."

== Track listing ==
Side one
No.	Title	Writer(s)	Length
1.	"Who Do You Love"	Ian Hunter	4:29
2.	"All Your Love"	Bob Seger	4:09
3.	"Dreaming as One"	David Palmer, William D. Smith	4:20
4.	"Turned Up Too Late"	Graham Parker	3:37
5.	"Happy"	Mick Jagger, Keith Richards	2:59

Side two
No.	Title	Writer(s)	Length
6.	"Blind Faith"	Gerry Rafferty, Joe Egan	3:51
7.	"Don't Let a Thief Steal into Your Heart"	Richard Thompson	4:17
8.	"(She Got) The Fever"	Bruce Springsteen	6:15
9.	"The Shape I'm In"	Robbie Robertson	3:22

2009 remastered bonus tracks
No.	Title	Writer(s)	Length
10.	"Nothin' But a Heartache"	Michael McDonald	3:19

== Personnel ==
The Pointer Sisters

- Anita Pointer – lead vocals (3, 7), backing vocals
- Ruth Pointer – lead vocals (2, 6, 8), backing vocals
- June Pointer – lead vocals (1, 4, 5, 9), backing vocals

Musicians

- Bill Payne – acoustic piano (1–4, 8, 9)
- Nicky Hopkins – acoustic piano (5, 6)
- William D. "Smitty" Smith – organ (1–4, 7, 8, 9), electric piano (7)
- Waddy Wachtel – lead guitar (1, 2, 4, 5, 8), guitar (1–4, 7–9), acoustic guitar (4), rhythm guitar (5, 6), slide guitar (7, 9)
- Dan Dugmore – guitar (1, 2, 7–9), pedal steel guitar (3), lead guitar (6), EBow (6)
- David Spinozza – guitar (4), slide guitar (5)
- Scott Chambers – bass (1–9)
- Rick Marotta – drums (1–9)
- Bobby Guidotti – tambourine (5), percussion (7, 9)

Production

- Richard Perry – producer
- Dennis Kirk – recording engineer
- Gabe Veltri – assistant engineer
- Bill Schnee – remix engineer
- Doug Sax and Mike Reese – mastering at The Mastering Lab (Los Angeles, CA).
- Kathleen Nelson – production coordinator
- Michael Solomon – production coordinator
- Michael Barackman – song coordinator
- Kosh – art direction and design
- Mark Hanauer – photography

== Chart positions ==
Chart performance for Priority
Chart (1979)	Peak position
Australian Albums (Kent Music Report)	61
US Billboard 200	72
US Top R&B/Hip-Hop Albums (Billboard)	44
