= Special Things =

Studio album by the Pointer Sisters
- Released: August 1, 1980
- Studio: Studio 55, Los Angeles, California
- Genre: R&B, pop, soul
- Label: Planet
- Producer: Richard Perry

The Pointer Sisters chronology
Priority (1979)	Special Things (1980)	Black & White (1981)

Singles from Special Things
- 1. "He's So Shy" Released: July 23, 1980; 2. "Could I Be Dreaming" Released: 1980; 3. "We've Got the Power" Released: 1980; 4. "Where Did the Time Go?" Released: 1980

Professional ratings
Review scores
Source	Rating
AllMusic	4/5 stars
The Rolling Stone Album Guide	3.5/5 stars

Special Things is the seventh studio album by the Pointer Sisters, released in 1980 on Planet Records.

== History ==
The album marked their third venture with producer Richard Perry and featured a more stylized R&B/pop production, launching the group into its most successful period. The album spawned their second top three gold-certified single, "He's So Shy". The album also contains minor hit "Could I Be Dreamin’" and two songs written by Burt Bacharach, "The Love Too Good to Last" and "Where Did the Time Go".

== Track listing ==
Side one
No.	Title	Writer(s)	Length
1.	"Could I Be Dreaming"	Anita Pointer, Trevor Lawrence, Marlo Henderson	3:31
2.	"He's So Shy"	Tom Snow, Cynthia Weil	3:37
3.	"The Love Too Good to Last"	Burt Bacharach, Carole Bayer Sager, Peter Allen	3:32
4.	"Evil"	Geoffrey Leib, Larry Lingle	3:19
5.	"Save This Night for Love"	Ellison Chase, Bill Haberman, Art Jacobson	3:25

Side two
No.	Title	Writer(s)	Length
6.	"We've Got the Power"	Michael Brooks, Bob Esty	4:53
7.	"Where Did the Time Go"	Bacharach, Sager	3:08
8.	"Special Things"	Anita Pointer	3:08
9.	"Here Is Where Your Love Belongs"	Bill Champlin	4:40

2010 remastered bonus track
No.	Title	Writer(s)	Length
10.	"Movin' On"	Anita Pointer, Ruth Pointer, June Pointer, Lawrence, Henderson	3:19

== Personnel ==
The Pointer Sisters

- Anita Pointer – lead vocals (1, 3, 5, 8), backing vocals
- June Pointer – lead vocals (2, 4, 6, 7), backing vocals
- Ruth Pointer – lead vocals (9), backing vocals

Musicians

- Greg Phillinganes – keyboards (1, 3−5, 7, 9), synthesizers (5), clavinet (6)
- Tom Snow – keyboards (2), synthesizers (2)
- Lance Ong – synthesizers (3, 4)
- Michael Boddicker – synthesizer programming (5), synthesizers (8)
- John Barnes – Fender Rhodes (6), keyboards (8)
- Clarence McDonald – acoustic piano (6)
- Burt Bacharach – keyboards (7)
- Paul Jackson Jr. – guitars (1, 3, 5, 9), guitar solo (4)
- Tim May – guitars (2, 6, 8)
- Ben Bridges – guitars (4)
- Marlo Henderson – guitars (4, 5, 7)
- Mark Goldenberg – guitars (6, 8)
- David Williams – guitars (7, 9)
- Nathan Watts – bass (1−5, 8, 9), percussion (5)
- John Pierce – bass (6)
- James Jamerson – bass (7)
- Ollie E. Brown – drums (1, 3, 5)
- James Gadson – drums (2, 6, 8)
- Raymond Pounds – drums (4)
- Ricky Lawson – drums (7, 9)
- Paulinho da Costa – percussion (1−4, 8)
- Jay Hutson – alto flute (1), saxophones (4)
- Don Myrick – alto flute (1), saxophones (4), alto sax solo (9)
- Bill Reichenbach Jr. – trombone (1, 4)
- Dick Hyde – trombone (4)
- Chuck Findley – trumpet (1), flugelhorn (1, 3)
- Steve Madaio – trumpet (1, 4), flugelhorn (1)
- Warren Looney – flugelhorn (3)
- Larry Gittens – trumpet (4)
- Gary Grant – trumpet (4)
- Henry Sigismonti – French horn (1)
- Sid Sharp – concertmaster (1, 3, 5−7, 9)

Music arrangements

- The Pointer Sisters – all vocal arrangements
- Trevor Lawrence – arrangements (1, 6, 9), horn arrangements (1, 4, 6, 7, 9), string arrangements (1, 5, 6, 9), conductor (1, 5, 6, 9), orchestration (3)
- Tom Snow – arrangements (2)
- Burt Bacharach – horn arrangements (3), string arrangements (3, 7)

== Production ==
- Richard Perry – producer
- Trevor Lawrence – associate producer
- Gabe Veltri – recording
- Tim Dennen – assistant engineer
- Jim Küenzi – assistant engineer
- Stephen Marcussen – assistant engineer
- Raven Royce-Jordan – assistant engineer
- James Guthrie – remixing
- Mike Reese – mastering
- Doug Sax – mastering
- The Mastering Lab (Los Angeles, CA) – mastering location
- Daniel Kushnick – production coordinator
- Michael Solomon – production coordinator
- John Kosh – art direction, design
- Aaron Rapoport – photography

== Chart positions ==
Chart performance for Special Things
Chart (1980)	Peak position
Australian Albums (Kent Music Report)	67
US Billboard 200	34
US Top R&B/Hip-Hop Albums (Billboard)	19
