= Contact (Pointer Sisters album) =

Studio album by the Pointer Sisters
- Released: July 1, 1985
- Recorded: 1984–1985
- Studios: Studio 55 (Los Angeles, California); Starke Lake Studios (Ocoee, Florida); Clinton Recording Studios (New York City, New York); RAK Studios (London, UK)
- Genre: R&B
- Length: 39:05 (Standard release); 1:17:52 (Remastered release)
- Label: RCA Records
- Producer: Richard Perry

The Pointer Sisters chronology
Break Out (1983)	Contact (1985)	Hot Together (1986)

Singles from Contact
- 1. "Dare Me" Released: June 1985; 2. "Freedom" Released: 1985; 3. "Twist My Arm" Released: 1985; 4. "Back in My Arms" Released: 1986

Contact is the eleventh studio album by the American vocal group the Pointer Sisters, released in 1985 by RCA Records. Continuing the glossy electronic pop/R&B sound established for the group by producer Richard Perry with Break Out in 1983, Contact yielded two hit singles: "Dare Me" and "Freedom". The Latin-inflected dance song "Dare Me", with its video showing the sisters as male boxing managers, rose to number 11 on the US pop chart, and hit number 17 in the UK. The atmospheric "Freedom" missed the Top 40 at number 59 but rose to number 25 on the R&B chart in January 1986.

== History ==
Upon its release, Contact quickly became the Pointer Sisters' second-most successful album to that date; it was certified Platinum, denoting U.S. sales of over one million, and it helped the trio win an American Music Award for "Favorite Video Group" in 1986. Contact yielded U.S. chart hits with the singles "Dare Me" (Hot 100 number 11, UK number 17), "Freedom" and "Twist My Arm." Another song, "Back in My Arms", was released as a single and video in the UK.

A track from the Contact sessions, titled "Just a Little Closer", was released on the We Are the World charity compilation album in 1985.

Contact was remastered and issued on CD with bonus tracks in 2011 by Big Break Records.

== Reception ==
Professional ratings
Review scores
Source	Rating
AllMusic	2.5/5 stars
Sounds	3/5 stars

Ondarock critic Damiano Pandolfini wrote that Contact "heads toward a bigger, more radio-friendly brand of electronic pop, retaining only flashes of the elegant balance achieved on the previous record [Break Out]". He noted the single "Twist My Arm" as the album's most enjoyable track, while also highlighting "Pound, Pound, Pound", a song "built on an electronic fabric of British synth-pop somewhere between OMD and Eurythmics".

== Track listing ==
No.	Title	Writer(s)	Length
1.	"Twist My Arm"	Andy Goldmark; Bruce Roberts	4:25
2.	"Hey You"	Richard Page; Steve George; John Lang	3:58
3.	"Pound, Pound, Pound"	Roberts; Goldmark	4:04
4.	"Back in My Arms"	Page; George; Lang; Pat Mastelotto	4:39
5.	"Burn Down the Night"	Page; George; Lang; Mastelotto	3:09
6.	"Bodies and Souls"	Mark Goldenberg	3:49
7.	"Contact"	Robbie Nevil; Brock Walsh	4:21
8.	"Dare Me"	Sam Lorber; David Innis	4:06
9.	"Freedom"	David McHugh	6:21

2011 remastered bonus tracks
No.	Title	Writer(s)	Length
10.	"I'll Be There"	Bob Etoll	3:34
11.	"Dare Me" (12-inch dance mix)		6:17
12.	"Twist My Arm" (12-inch dance mix)		5:53
13.	"Back in My Arms" (12-inch dance mix)		6:37
14.	"Dare Me" (single version)		3:43
15.	"Freedom" (single version)		4:21
16.	"Twist My Arm" (single version)		4:09
17.	"Dare Me" (instrumental)		4:23

== Personnel ==
The Pointer Sisters

- Anita Pointer – lead vocals (1, 5, 9), backing vocals
- June Pointer – lead vocals (3, 6, 8), backing vocals
- Ruth Pointer – lead vocals (2, 4, 7), backing vocals

Musicians

- Andy Goldmark – synthesizers (1, 3), drum machine programming (1, 3), arrangements (1, 3), acoustic piano (3)
- Bruce Roberts – synthesizers (1), drum machine programming (1, 3), arrangements (1, 3)
- Paul Fox – additional synthesizers (1, 2, 4, 9), E-mu Emulator II (5, 8)
- Howie Rice – arrangements (1), additional synthesizers (1, 2, 4, 7, 9), guitars (1, 3, 8), synthesizers (3, 6, 8), handclaps (3), drum machine programming (8, 9), Minimoog (9)
- Steve George – keyboards (2, 4, 5), synthesizers (2, 4), arrangements (2, 4, 5), synth bass (5)
- Steve Mitchell – additional synthesizers (2, 7), Hammond B3 organ (3, 5), handclaps (3), Oberheim DMX programming (6), synthesizers (8), drum machine programming (8)
- Jeff Lorber – synth bass (3), synthesizers (9), guitars (9), drum machine programming (9)
- Mark Goldenberg – acoustic piano (6), synthesizers (6), guitars (6), drum machine programming (6), arrangements (6)
- Tommy Faragher – keyboards (7), synthesizers (7)
- Steve Farris – guitars (2)
- Michael Landau – guitars (4)
- Robbie Nevil – guitars (7), drum machine programming (7), arrangements (7)
- Peter Rafelson – guitars (8)
- Nathan East – bass (1, 2)
- Neil Stubenhaus – bass (4)
- Jennifer Condos – bass (6)
- Welton Gite – bass (8)
- Pat Mastelotto – drum machine programming (2, 4, 5), drums (4, 5)
- Harry Stinson – drum machine programming (6)
- Brock Walsh – drum machine programming (7), arrangements (7)
- Paulinho da Costa – percussion (1, 4−9)
- Terral "Terry" Santiel – percussion (1, 3, 5, 6)
- Debra Dobkin – percussion (6)
- Larry Williams – saxophones (5)
- Phil Kenzie – saxophone (6)
- Bill Reichenbach Jr. – trombone (5)
- Gary Grant – trumpet (5)
- Jerry Hey – trumpet (5), horn arrangements (5)
- Paul Buckmaster – string arrangements and conductor (2, 4)
- Richard Page – arrangements (2, 4, 5)

Production

- Richard Perry – producer
- Andy Goldmark – associate producer (1, 3)
- Howie Rice – associate producer (1)
- Bruce Roberts – associate producer (1, 3)
- Steve George – associate producer (2, 4)
- Richard Page – associate producer (2, 4, 5)
- Mark Goldenberg – associate producer (6)
- Robbie Nevil – associate producer (7)
- Brock Walsh – associate producer (7)
- James C. Tract – production manager
- Bradford Rosenberg – production coordinator
- John Kosh – art direction, design
- Ron Larson – art direction, design
- Randee St. Nicholas – photography

Technical credits

- Stephen Marcussen – mastering at Precision Mastering (Hollywood, California)
- Michael Brooks – recording engineer
- Paul Rey – basic track engineer (2)
- Ian Eales – basic track engineer (4, 5)
- Ernie Sheesley – basic track engineer (7)
- Don Smith – remixing, additional engineer
- Clif Jones – additional engineer
- Glen Holguin – additional engineer, assistant engineer
- Alex Schmoll – additional engineer, assistant engineer
- Gary Skardina – additional engineer
- David Dubow – assistant engineer
- Julie Last – assistant engineer
- Ray Leonard – assistant engineer
- Bob Loftus – assistant engineer
- Kraig Miller – assistant engineer
- Delilah Seroussi – assistant engineer

== Charts ==
=== Weekly charts ===
Weekly chart performance for Contact
Chart (1985)	Peak position
Australian Albums (Kent Music Report)	17
Canada Top Albums/CDs (RPM)	14
Dutch Albums (Album Top 100)	37
European Albums (Eurotipsheet)	31
German Albums (Offizielle Top 100)	49
New Zealand Albums (RMNZ)	36
Swedish Albums (Sverigetopplistan)	6
Swiss Albums (Schweizer Hitparade)	19
UK Albums (Official Charts)	34
US Billboard 200	25
US Billboard Top Black Albums	11

=== Year-end charts ===
Year-end chart performance for Contact
Chart (1985)	Position
Canada Top Albums/CDs (RPM)	52
