= Neutron Dance =

Single by the Pointer Sisters

from the album Break Out
- B-side: "Telegraph Your Love"
- Released: November 1984
- Recorded: 1983
- Genre: Synth-pop; dance-pop
- Length: 4:12 (album version); 3:53 (7" version); 4:59 (extended version)
- Label: Planet, RCA
- Songwriters: Allee Willis, Danny Sembello
- Producer: Richard Perry

The Pointer Sisters singles chronology
"I'm So Excited" (1984)	"Neutron Dance" (1984)	"Baby Come and Get It" (1985)

Music video
- "Neutron Dance" on YouTube

"Neutron Dance" is a song written by Allee Willis and Danny Sembello which was introduced by the Pointer Sisters on their 1983 album Break Out. The song became a Top Ten hit in 1985, its success augmented by being prominently featured on the soundtrack of the motion picture Beverly Hills Cop.

== Background ==
According to Allee Willis, "Neutron Dance" was written in hopes of being placed on the soundtrack of the film Streets of Fire: "We were told that there was a scene on a bus that was leaving town after there had been this nuclear holocaust, and that a '50s doo-wop black group was going to be at the back of the bus that the lead couple was escaping on ... Danny Sembello and I just met that day ... I was very disinterested in songwriting at that point, and I'm writing with this kid who's never had a record before, and I just wanted to get him in and out".

"He was a phenomenal keyboard player, and I just said: 'Play the most common sounding old fashioned '50s black music bass line that you can think of.' And he just started doing the [rhythm for "Neutron Dance"]. And I'm someone who could write a melody to a spoon falling on the table. So I literally sang that melody down. First time down, he just kind of followed and went to the right places. And then I said, Let's just write this quick lyric ... we're taking a half an hour on the lyric, and this thing's gonna get done."

Willis adds that the lyric theme of "Neutron Dance" was due to "all this stuff going on in my life: I don't want to take it anymore, I'll just stay here locked behind the door. Just no time to stop and get away, because I work so hard to make it every day. Really a lyric about all these things falling apart in your life, and you know what, just get it together and change your life."

According to Willis while working on the lyrics with Sembello she looked through a window and saw someone attempting to break into her car: while running outside to scare off the thief Willis called out to Sembello: "Someone stole my brand new Chevrolet", and the line was included in the song.

== The Pointer Sisters version / Beverly Hills Cop ==
"Neutron Dance" featuring Ruth Pointer on lead vocal was introduced on the Pointer Sisters' October 1983 album release Break Out; Ruth Pointer would recall: "When I first heard 'Neutron Dance' I didn't want to sing it. I liked [its] rhythm and vigorous arrangement but to me the word 'neutron' had a violent connotation on account of the neutron bomb then so much in the news." Ruth Pointer recalls suggesting to Allee Willis that the song's lyric be modified: "she told me to quit overthinking it and just sing the damn song! Luckily I shut up and listened. I gave 'Neutron Dance' a gospel feel and nailed it in a few takes."

Despite four singles being released from Break Out in its initial year of release "Neutron Dance" was issued as a single in November 1984, the major factor in the track's single release being the placement of the song on the soundtrack of the upcoming film Beverly Hills Cop, which was released December 5, 1984. In Beverly Hills Cop, "Neutron Dance" was prominently featured during a key car chase sequence with whose action the song proved musically and lyrically compatible.

Allee Willis described the experience of witnessing her composition featured in the film as "mind-boggling...on that line, 'someone stole my brand new Chevrolet,' this cigarette truck that Eddie Murphy is locked up in the back of, screaming through the streets of Detroit, slams into this Chevrolet. And 'I'm just burning, doing the Neutron Dance,' which to me meant someone could push the button tomorrow and we could all go up in smoke, so make your change now. On that line, a car explodes. I mean, I couldn't have written a better song for a movie scene if my life depended on it."

According to Ruth Pointer, although "Neutron Dance" proved effective when utilized in the rough cut of the film's car chase sequence, the producers of Beverly Hills Cop were disinclined to retain the song, instead asking Richard Perry to create a new similarly styled track to score the car chase sequence in the completed film: however, Perry demurred opining that "Neutron Dance" was a "one in a million song." "Neutron Dance" was used prominently in the trailers for Beverly Hills Cop, Beverly Hills Cop II (1987), and Beverly Hills Cop: Axel F (2024).

Concurrent with the single's release, a video for "Neutron Dance" began airing on MTV. The music video stars the Pointer Sisters as discontented theatre ushers, and also features future Perfect Strangers star Bronson Pinchot as their boss and actor Gary Burghoff, best known from the M*A*S*H film and TV series, as the cinema operator; the setting was a cinema where Beverly Hills Cop was screening, allowing for the promotion of the movie via many clips from it being displayed in the video. Pinchot himself plays a minor role in the film as "Serge", a salesman in Jenny Summers' art gallery.

In March 1985 "Neutron Dance" became the fourth Top Ten single issued from the Break Out album rising as high as #6. It was the career zenith of the Pointer Sisters who prior to the success of "Jump (For My Love)" subsequent to that of "Automatic" – the second and third singles from Break Out – had never had back-to-back Top 20 singles. "Neutron Dance" proved to be the group's final Top Ten hit: after a sixth single release from Break Out: "Baby Come & Get It", fell short of the Top 40, "Dare Me", the lead single from the follow-up album to Break Out, Contact, stalled at #11 and the group's sole further Top 40 charting "Goldmine" (1986), rose no higher than #33. The Pointer Sisters just missed the Top 40 with "Be There", a track in the vein of "Neutron Dance" – co-written by Allee Willis with Franne Golde and featuring Ruth Pointer on lead – for the soundtrack of Beverly Hills Cop II, "Be There"'s peak being #42.

The Sisters performed the song live during a televised 30th Anniversary celebration of Disneyland. The Sisters dance in place in the middle of Tomorrowland, surrounded by dancers dressed in costumes from Disney's 1982 hit film TRON and light-bulb-encrusted floats from the Main Street Electrical Parade roll and spin through the 'dance floor.

This song was later used in Totally Minnie special, and was also used in the film Welcome Home Roscoe Jenkins.

== Personnel ==
- Ruth Pointer – lead vocals
- Anita Pointer – backing vocals
- June Pointer – backing vocals

Musicians

- Stephen Mitchell – synthesizer programming
- Howie Rice – acoustic piano, synthesizers, organ, guitars, drum machine programming, percussion
- Paul Fox – E-mu Emulator
- Reek Havoc – electronic drum programming
- Bob Mithoff – drum machine programming
- Paulinho da Costa – tambourine

== Track listings ==
7" single

1. "Neutron Dance" - 3:53
2. "Telegraph Your Love" - 4:02

== Chart performance ==
=== Weekly charts ===
Chart (1984–1985)	Peak position
Australia (Kent Music Report)	4
Austria (Ö3 Austria Top 40)	19
Belgium (Ultratop 50 Flanders)	26
Canada Top Singles (RPM)	1
Denmark (Hitlisten)	8
Ecuador (UPI)	3
German Singles Chart	18
Ireland (IRMA)	14
Netherlands (Single Top 100)	21
Netherlands (Dutch Top 40)	36
New Zealand (Recorded Music NZ)	17
Sweden (Sverigetopplistan)	7
Switzerland (Schweizer Hitparade)	14
UK Singles Chart	31
US Billboard Hot 100	6
US Billboard Hot Black Singles	13
US Billboard Adult Contemporary	23
US Billboard Hot Dance Club Play	4
US Cash Box Top 100	10

=== Year-end charts ===
Chart (1985)	Position
Australia (Kent Music Report)	17
Canada (RPM Magazine)	13
US Billboard Hot 100	38
US Cash Box	91
