= Aaron Pointer =

American baseball player (born 1942)

- Outfielder
- Born: April 19, 1942 (age 84); Little Rock, Arkansas, U.S.
- Batted: Right Threw: Right

MLB debut
- September 22, 1963, for the Houston Colt .45s

Last MLB appearance
- October 1, 1967, for the Houston Astros

MLB statistics
- Batting average: .208
- Home runs: 2
- Runs batted in: 15
- Stats at Baseball Reference

Teams
- Houston Colt .45s / Astros (1963–1967); Nishitetsu Lions (1970–1972)

Aaron Elton Pointer (born April 19, 1942) is an American former professional baseball player. He played in the major leagues for the Houston Colt .45s/Astros in 1963 and again in 1966–1967. After his baseball career, he was a National Football League official. He is also known for being the brother of the four sisters who form the Pointer Sisters singing group.

== Biography ==
=== Early life ===
Pointer is the eldest of six children of Rev. Elton and Sarah Elizabeth Pointer, pastors at the West Oakland Church of God. He is the older brother of Fritz Pointer, a college professor and author, and older brother of Ruth, Anita, Bonnie, and June Pointer of the Pointer Sisters.

Aaron Pointer grew up in West Oakland, California, and attended McClymonds High School, where he became student body president. At McCymonds, Pointer was active in sports. Along with two future NBA players, Paul Silas (Pointer's cousin) and Joe Ellis, he played with McClymonds High's unbeaten 1959–60 team. He went to the University of San Francisco on a full basketball scholarship. At USF, he met his wife, Leona.

=== Baseball career ===
In 1961, Pointer signed with Houston, a National League expansion team set to begin major league play the following season. In his debut 1961 campaign, Pointer became the last player to bat over .400 in a full summer season of organized professional baseball in the United States and Canada (although several players have since done so in Mexico.) Playing in 93 games for the Class D Salisbury Braves of the Western Carolinas League and four games for the Triple-A Houston Buffs of the American Association, he batted .402 with 132 total hits. He led the Western Carolinas circuit in runs and batting average, and was named Most Valuable Player and an All-Star.

Pointer made his debut in the major leagues during the last week of the 1963 season, appearing in two games for the Colt .45s, then spent the entirety of the 1964 and 1965 seasons in Houston's minor league system, as well as most of the 1966 and 1967 seasons. He did play 38 games for the renamed Astros in 1966 and 1967. Over three seasons, Pointer had a .208 batting average with two home runs and 15 runs batted in. He was traded to the Chicago Cubs during the 1968 season, but never made it back to the major leagues. He played for the Triple-A Tacoma Cubs in 1968 and 1969, and signed with the Nishitetsu Lions in Fukuoka, Japan after the 1969 season. Pointer played three seasons in Japan from 1970 to 1972. He also played in Venezuela before retiring.

=== After baseball ===
After retiring from baseball, Pointer settled in Tacoma, Washington, in 1973 and worked for Pierce County Parks and Recreation, scheduling and supervising athletic activities. He began officiating football games at the recreational level and later at the high school and college level.

From 1978 to 1987, Pointer officiated for the Pacific-10 Conference, eventually becoming a head linesman. He is also the first African American referee in the Pac-10. In 1987, Pointer joined the National Football League as a head linesman wearing uniform number 79. He retired from the NFL after the 2003 season, but he continues to serve as a game-day observer for the NFL. He once worked a game in Los Angeles where his sisters sang the national anthem before kickoff.

Pointer retired from Pierce County Parks and Recreation in 2000 after 29 years. He currently serves as president of the Metropolitan Park District of Tacoma board of commissioners, after being appointed to fill a vacancy in 2001. He also serves on the Executive Board of the Tacoma Athletic Commission.

In June 2008, Pointer was inducted into the Tacoma Hall of Fame.
