= Sadako Pointer =

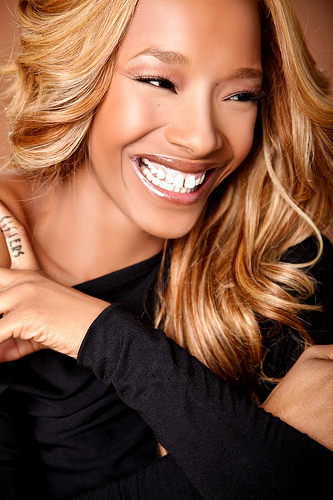
- Pointer in 2014

Background information
- Born: Sadako Ruth Pointer Johnson; March 25, 1984 (age 42); Marin County, California, U.S.
- Genres: R&B, soul, pop, dance, rock, jazz, country
- Occupation: Singer
- Years active: 2009–present
- Member of: The Pointer Sisters

Sadako Ruth Pointer Johnson (born March 24, 1984), known professionally as Sadako Pointer, is an American singer.

== Biography ==
Born in 1984, Sadako Pointer is the granddaughter of Ruth Pointer of the Pointer Sisters through Ruth's daughter Faun. She grew up in New York City and Los Angeles, California, and is of Japanese and African American descent. Sadako tours with The Pointer Sisters (Ruth and aunt Issa Pointer). She appeared in the 2014 film Proxy.
