= Love for What It Is =

Studio album by Anita Pointer
- Released: December 1, 1987
- Studio: Record Plant (Sausalito, California); Studio D Recording (Sausalito, California); Different Fur Studios (San Francisco, California)
- Genre: R&B
- Length: 42:54
- Label: RCA
- Producer: Preston Glass

Professional ratings
Review scores
Source	Rating
AllMusic	2/5 stars

Love for What It Is is the only studio album by Anita Pointer, released in 1987 on the RCA label.

== History ==
The album was released on RCA Records in 1987, by the time Pointer was still in the Pointer Sisters. The album spawned a single, "Overnight Success", which peaked at No. 41 on the Hot R&B/Hip Hop Songs chart. It peaked at No. 12 on Jet's Top 20 singles. It appeared at No. 97 on the Top Black Singles chart in 1987. Another single, "More Than a Memory", released in 1988, peaked at No. 73 on the same chart. The Chicago Tribune noted, "the album reaffirms its basic theme, whether it's the music, graceful, melodic, gospel-tinged soul without the brittle pop edge of more recent Pointer Sisters' outings".

== Track listing ==
Side one
No.	Title	Writer(s)	Length
1.	"Overnight Success"	Mike & Brenda Sutton	4:45
2.	"Love Me Like You Do"	LeMel Humes, Mary Lee Kortes	5:25
3.	"The Pledge (with Philip Bailey)"	Jennifer Kimball, Tom Snow	3:16
4.	"You Don't Scare Me"	Don Cook, Steve Diamond	3:40
5.	"More Than a Memory"	Alan Glass, Preston Glass, Ron Broomfield	4:45

Side two
No.	Title	Writer(s)	Length
6.	"Have a Little Faith in Love"	Alan Roy Scott, Michael Jay, S. Diamond	5:56
7.	"Love for What It Is"	Lorraine Bregante	5:05
8.	"Beware of What You Want"	Brenda Russell, P. Glass	5:42
9.	"Temporarily Blue"	Bob Moulds, David Wills	4:20
Total length:			42:54

== Personnel ==
Adapted from liner notes.

- Anita Pointer – vocals, backing vocals (1, 2, 4–9)
- Preston Glass – keyboards, guitars (1, 3, 4), drums (1, 3, 4, 6), drum programming (2, 5, 7, 8), acoustic guitar (9), electric guitar (9)
- Steve Diamond – guitars (2, 5)
- Ned Selfe – steel guitar (9)
- Marc Russo – saxophone solo (7)
- Linda "Peaches" Green – backing vocals (1, 2, 5, 6, 8)
- Jada Pointer – backing vocals (1, 2, 4–9)
- Philip Bailey – vocals (3)

=== Production ===
- Teri Muench – A&R direction
- Preston Glass – producer, arrangements
- Stan Sheppard – co-producer (1)
- Anita Pointer – arrangements
- Maureen Droney – recording, mixing
- Devon Galbraith – assistant engineer
- Stuart Hirotsu – assistant engineer
- Tom Sazdeck – assistant engineer
- Jim Watts Vereecke – assistant engineer
- Bernie Grundman – mastering at Bernie Grundman Mastering (Hollywood, California)
- Ria Lewerke – art direction
- Pietro Alfieri – design
- Leon Lecash – photography
- Leonardo Cromwell – hair stylist
- La'Nette LaFrance – hair stylist
- Rebekah Alvi – wardrobe
- Laurel Baker – wardrobe
- Angelika – make-up
- Gary W. Reid – management
