= He's So Shy =

Single by Pointer Sisters

from the album Special Things
- B-side: "Movin' On"
- Released: July 23, 1980
- Recorded: 1980
- Studio: Studio 55 (Los Angeles)
- Genre: R&B; pop; post-disco; synth-pop
- Length: 3:37
- Label: Planet
- Songwriters: Tom Snow; Cynthia Weil
- Producer: Richard Perry

Pointer Sisters singles chronology
"Who Do You Love" (1979)	"He's So Shy" (1980)	"Could I Be Dreaming" (1980)

Music video
- "He's So Shy" on YouTube

"He's So Shy" is a song by the American girl group Pointer Sisters from their seventh studio album, Special Things (1980). Written, originally as "She's So Shy" and intended for Leo Sayer, in December 1979 by Tom Snow and Cynthia Weil, "He's So Shy" was released as the lead single from Special Things on July 23, 1980, through the Planet label.

The song's fusion of classic girl group pop, new wave-styled dance music and R&B proved the right combination to effect a top 10 comeback for the group, reaching position number three on the US Billboard Hot 100 in October 1980 (it would hold that position during the same three weeks that Barbra Streisand's "Woman in Love" held the number-one spot). "He's So Shy" set the prototype of the trademark Pointer Sisters sound which would afford the group its career peak in 1983–1984 with their Break Out album.

Record World magazine said that "June Pointer steps out on lead while an irresistible keyboard riff and snappy percussion drive this hit."

The Pointer Sisters made their music video debut with a promotional clip for "He's So Shy", described by Ruth Pointer as "a primitive affair, just the three of us dancing and lip-synching to the song inside the Bradbury Building in Downtown Los Angeles. Lots of stairs and elevators, but we made it work."

== Background and recording ==
Tom Snow would recall of "He's So Shy": "It was the first time I'd actually written a melody that I knew in my heart was a smash," and that it had been at the BMI Awards banquet where he was honored for the success of his composition "You" that Snow had met lyricist Cynthia Weil who, with her husband Barry Mann, formed the iconic Mann/Weil songwriting team. With Weil and Mann being in attendance at the banquet: Snow – "I did something I'm not prone to doing because I'm not a real self-promoter. I 'ginned-up' the courage, went over and introduced myself." After checking out Snow's output and being favorably impressed, Weil had agreed to collaborate with him, the inaugural Snow/Weil composition "Holdin' Out for Love" being recorded by Cher for her 1979 album Prisoner (an eventual R&B hit for Angela Bofill in 1982, "Holdin' Out for Love" was also recorded by the Pointer Sisters as a non-album cut utilized as the B-side of their 1981 hit "Slow Hand").

On his website, Snow recalls that the song was written very quickly after an extended period of struggling to come up with a hit:

"This one originated with the music and a working title, 'She's So Shy'. I had been plugging away for weeks trying to find a 'hit' hook. Everything I came up with sounded like derivative, melodic babble. Reduced to desperation one night I went into my studio after dinner and a few glasses of wine, set the Roland TR-808 to 120 beats per minute and started playing G minor arpeggios on my Prophet-5 synth. At least that was some viable form of music! That did the trick. Not having the pressure anymore of trying to come up with a smash hit, the vault opened up and within 30 minutes I had the melody, chord changes and a working title 'She's So Shy'. I knew immediately that I had come up with something very, very commercial. The feeling was intense. I remember leaving the studio three hours later after playing the tune hundreds of times and feeling like I was walking two inches above the floor. Not taking any chances I called Cynthia the next day and asked her to write the lyric. We both thought the song would be a smash and our instincts were right. 'He's So Shy' sold 1.5 million copies. I will be forever indebted to those G minor arpeggios."

Producer Richard Perry on "He's So Shy"
"I thought it much more powerful sung by a girl: guys are deceptively shy, often more so than girls. I heard it as a cross between 'He's So Fine' and 'The Shoop Shoop Song'. I didn't [tactically] jump on the 'What a Fool Believes' bandwagon" – admitting stylistic similarity to the influential Doobie Brothers 1979 number-one hit – "but [that style was already] enmeshed in ['He's So Shy'.]"

Although the title recalls the girl group classic "He's So Fine" by the Chiffons, "He's So Shy" was in fact conceived by its composer as "She's So Shy" and was originally intended for Leo Sayer – Snow had co-written four songs for Sayer's 1977 album Thunder in My Heart (including the Top 40 title cut hit) and an additional four for Sayer's 1978 album Leo Sayer, both of which were produced by Richard Perry. By this time, however, Perry was no longer producing Sayer (subsequent to the Leo Sayer album) but "She's So Shy" came to his attention because Snow had signed with Perry's Braintree Music publishing firm in 1977, and Perry saw the potential of a gender-adjusted version of the song as a track for the Pointer Sisters, who'd inaugurated Perry's own Planet label with the 1978–1979 worldwide hit "Fire".

According to Ruth Pointer, Perry's assigning the lead vocal on "He's So Shy" to June Pointer was a disappointment to Anita Pointer, who Ruth says "wanted that song badly": Ruth has stated that Perry had recorded "He's So Shy" with Anita on lead but then opined: "I think I want June to record this [as lead]."

== Live performances ==
The Pointer Sisters performed "He's So Shy" on The Love Boat episode broadcast February 7, 1981. They portrayed members of the ship's housekeeping staff; when a record executive boards the ship, Isaac the bartender (Ted Lange) sees it as his chance to be discovered as a singer and recruits The Pointer Sisters to be his background singers for a performance of the song. His plan backfires when the record executive praises the background singers and signs them to a record deal.

== Personnel ==
Pointer Sisters

- June Pointer – lead and backing vocals
- Anita Pointer – backing vocals
- Ruth Pointer – backing vocals

Musicians

- Tom Snow – keyboards, synthesizers
- Tim May – guitars
- Nathan Watts – bass
- James Gadson – drums
- Paulinho da Costa – percussion

== Charts ==
=== Weekly charts ===
Chart (1980–1981)	Peak position
Australia (Kent Music Report)	11
Belgium (Flemish Region)	20
Canada Top Singles (RPM)	14
Netherlands (Dutch Top 40)	14
New Zealand (Recorded Music NZ)	1
US Billboard Hot 100	3
US Adult Contemporary (Billboard)	13
US Disco Top 100 (Billboard)	26
US Hot Soul Singles (Billboard)	10
US Cash Box Top 100	3

=== Year-end charts ===
Chart (1980)	Rank position
Australia (Kent Music Report)	58
Canada Top Singles (RPM)	98
New Zealand (Recorded Music NZ)	31
US Cash Box Top 100	36

== Certifications ==
Region	Certification	Certified units/sales
New Zealand (RMNZ)	Gold	15,000^{‡}
^{‡} Sales+streaming figures based on certification alone.
