= How Long (Betcha' Got a Chick on the Side) =

Single by the Pointer Sisters

from the album Steppin'
- B-side: "Easy Days"
- Released: 1975
- Recorded: 1975
- Genre: Funk
- Length: 3:30 (single edit); 7:21 (album version)
- Label: Blue Thumb
- Songwriters: Anita Pointer; Bonnie Pointer; David Rubinson
- Producer: David Rubinson

The Pointer Sisters singles chronology
"Live Your Life Before You Die" (1975)	"How Long (Betcha' Got a Chick on the Side)" (1975)	"Going Down Slowly" (1975)

Music video
- Official VEVO video (live) on YouTube

"How Long (Betcha' Got a Chick on the Side)" is a song by American vocal group the Pointer Sisters, released as the first single from their Steppin' album in 1975. Written by group members Anita Pointer and Bonnie Pointer with David Rubinson, the song's mixture of funky R&B and the sisters' soulful harmonies helped make it a standout in the Pointer Sisters' early catalog. The single was a significant success for the group, reaching number 20 on the US Billboard Hot 100 chart and was the group's only number-one single on the US Hot Soul Singles chart, where it spent two weeks at number one.

== Personnel ==
- Anita Pointer – lead vocals, backing vocals
- Ruth Pointer – backing vocals
- Bonnie Pointer – backing vocals
- June Pointer – backing vocals
- David Rubinson – producer

=== Other musicians ===
- Tom Salisbury – acoustic piano
- Chris Michie – guitar
- Wah Wah Watson – guitar
- Eugene Santini – bass
- Gaylord Birch – drums, percussion
