= Serious Slammin' =

Studio album by Pointer Sisters
- Released: March 1, 1988
- Recorded: 1986–1987
- Studio: Studio 55 Los Angeles, CA (primary)
- Genre: R&B
- Label: RCA Records
- Producer: Richard Perry

Pointer Sisters chronology
Hot Together (1986)	Serious Slammin' (1988)	Right Rhythm (1990)

Singles from Serious Slammin'
- 1. "He Turned Me Out" Released: 1988; 2. "I'm In Love" Released: 1988

Professional ratings
Review scores
Source	Rating
AllMusic	3/5 stars

Serious Slammin' is the thirteenth studio album by the Pointer Sisters, released in 1988 by RCA Records.

== History ==
Serious Slammin is the Pointer Sisters' 14th album in 15 years; it is the last record that the group made with longtime producer Richard Perry. Its first single, "He Turned Me Out" (also featured in the 1988 film Action Jackson), reached the R&B top 40. A second single, the ballad "I'm in Love", also reached the R&B chart. Other songs of note include "Moonlight Dancing" (written by Diane Warren and later covered by Bette Midler), fan favorite "I Will Be There" and the title track, which was later covered by George Clinton. Serious Slammin' is the Pointers' last album to chart on the Billboard Top 200 albums tally; it failed to make an entry on Billboard's R&B albums chart.

== Track listing ==
No.	Title	Writer(s)	Length
1.	"Serious Slammin'"	Gregg Crockett, Lelan Zales	4:28
2.	"Shut Up and Dance"	Glen Ballard, Siedah Garrett	4:16
3.	"Moonlight Dancing"	Diane Warren	4:52
4.	"He Turned Me Out"	LeMel Humes, Marylee Kortes	4:12
5.	"Flirtatious"	Jeff Pescetto, Tony Haynes	4:26
6.	"My Life" (Remix)"	Adele Bertei, David P. Bryant, Sandra Bernhard	4:49
7.	"I'm in Love"	Jonathan Butler, Simon May	4:16
8.	"Pride"	Jimmy Lang, Matthew Wilder	3:47
9.	"Uh-Uh"	Jeanette Hawes, Ricky Lawson, Robert Barnes, Anthony T. Coleman	4:17
10.	"I Will Be There"	Eddie Schwartz, David Tyson	4:47

== Personnel ==
The Pointer Sisters

- Anita Pointer – vocals
- June Pointer – vocals
- Ruth Pointer – vocals

Musicians

- Isaias Gamboa – acoustic piano solo (1), synthesizers (1), guitars (1), alternate bass (1), trombone (1), additional synthesizers (4)
- Gregg Crockett – additional synthesizers (1), guitars (1, 4), bass (1), drums (1), synth bass (3)
- John Bokowski – additional synthesizers (1, 2), synth horns (2), drums (2), synthesizers (3, 4), percussion (3, 4), keyboards (4), horns (4)
- Lelan Zales – additional synthesizers (1)
- Glen Ballard – clavinet (2), synthesizers (2), bass (2), synth bass (2)
- Paul Fox – additional keyboards (3), drum and percussion programming (3), synthesizers (6), drums (6)
- Guy Roche – synthesizers (3)
- Bob Mithoff – synthesizers (4), drum programming (4)
- LeMel Humes – synth bass (4)
- Pat Caddick – keyboards (5)
- Gregg Karukas – keyboards (5)
- David P. Bryant – synthesizers (6), drums (6)
- Jeff Lorber – Rhodes (7), synth bass (7), drum machine (7)
- Tony Coleman – clavinet (8), synthesizers (9), drums (9)
- Jim Lang – synthesizers (8), synth bass (8), drum machine (8)
- Matthew Wilder – organ (8), additional synthesizers (8)
- Richie Pagliari – keyboards (10)
- Ricky Timas – keyboards (10), bass (10), drums (10)
- Basil Fung – guitars (2)
- Paul Jackson Jr. – guitars (3, 6)
- Roland Bautista – guitars (9)
- Ricky Lawson – bass (9)
- Jeff Pescetto – drums (5)
- Peter Rafelson – percussion (4), guitars (7, 10), Rhodes (10), synthesizers (10), additional drums (10), effects (10)
- David Majal Li – saxophone (7)
- Sandra Bernhard – additional backing vocals (6)

=== Production ===
- Producer – Richard Perry
- Associate producers – James Reese (tracks 1–4); Norman Whitfield Jr. (tracks 1, 2); Glen Ballard (track 2); John Bokowski (track 3); Jeff Pescetto (track 5); David P. Bryant and Paul Fox (track 6); Jeff Lorber (track 7); Jim Lang and Matthew Wilder (track 8); Tony Coleman and Ricky Lawson (track 9); Ricky Timas (track 10).
- Additional production on track 6 – Michael Barbiero and Steve Thompson
- Vocals recorded by Michael Brooks
- Tracking engineers – Francis Buckley (tracks 1 & 2); Bob Mithoff (track 4).
- Recording engineers – Glen Holguin (tracks 5 & 8); Francis Buckley (track 6); Jeff Lorber (track 7); Robert Brown (track 9); Ted Blaidsell (track 10).
- Additional engineers – Michael Brooks, Robert Brown, Francis Buckley, Glen Holguin, Jeff Lorber, Ross Stein and Norman Whitfield Jr.
- Assistant engineers – Bryan Arnett, Ken Felton, Cliff Jones, Robin Laine, Kraig Miller, Richard Platt and Jay Willis.
- Recorded at Studio 55, Studio Masters and Skip Saylor Recording (Los Angeles, CA); JHL Studios (Pacific Palisades, CA); Mithoff Studio; Rafelson Recording.
- Mixing – Norman Whitfield Jr. (tracks 3 & 4); John Potoker (tracks 5, 7, 9 & 10); Mick Guzauski (track 8).
- Remixing on track 6 – Michael Barbiero and Steve Thompson
- Remixed at Studio 55, Record Plant and Conway Studios (Los Angeles, CA); Mediasound (New York, NY).
- Mastered by Brian Gardner at Bernie Grundman Mastering (Hollywood, CA).
- Production coordination – Cheryl Henning and Scott Maddox
- Production manager – James C. Tract
- A&R direction – Paul Atkinson and Erik Nuri
- Art direction and design – John Kosh
- Photography – Herb Ritts
- Management – Gallin Morrey Associates

== Charts ==
Chart performance for Serious Slammin'
Chart (1988)	Peak position
Swedish Albums (Sverigetopplistan)	30
US Billboard Top Pop Albums	152
