= I'm So Excited =

- Picture sleeve for 1982 US 12-inch 33 1/3-RPM single

Single by the Pointer Sisters

from the album So Excited! and Break Out
- B-side: "Nothin' but a Heartache" (1982); "Dance Electric" (1984); "What a Surprise" (1984)
- Released: September 1982
- Recorded: 1982
- Genre: Dance-pop
- Length: 4:54 (1984 remix); 3:50 (original album version/single edit)
- Label: Planet; RCA
- Songwriters: Anita Pointer; June Pointer; Ruth Pointer; Trevor Lawrence
- Producer: Richard Perry

The Pointer Sisters singles 1982 singles chronology
"American Music" (1982)	"I'm So Excited" (1982)	"If You Wanna Get Back Your Lady" (1983)

The Pointer Sisters singles 1984 singles chronology
"Jump (For My Love)" (1984)	"I'm So Excited" (1984)	"Neutron Dance" (1984)

Music video
- "I'm So Excited" on YouTube

"I'm So Excited" is a song by American girl group the Pointer Sisters. Jointly written and composed by the sisters in collaboration with Trevor Lawrence, it was originally released in September 1982, reaching number 30 on the US Billboard Hot 100. This was followed by a remixed re-release in July 1984, reaching number 9 on the Billboard Hot 100. Billboard named the song number 23 on their list of "100 Greatest Girl Group Songs Of All Time".

== Background ==
The song was originally recorded for and appeared on the Sisters' 1982 album, So Excited!, and was subsequently released as a single. Upon its release, the single charted at No. 28 on the Billboard Dance Music/Club Play Singles chart, No. 30 on the Billboard Hot 100 and No. 46 on the Billboard R&B Singles chart. Billboard called it "sexy and fun".

Two years later, on the group's RIAA certified multi-Platinum album Break Out, a slightly remixed and edited version of the song was included and re-released as a single. This time, it peaked at No. 9 on the Billboard Hot 100 and No. 25 on the Billboard Adult Contemporary chart.

In March 2001, the song was included in the RIAA and National Endowment for the Arts project Songs of the Century, a list intended to "promote a better understanding of America's musical and cultural heritage." The song was ranked at number 264 out of 365 songs.

== Music video ==
A music video was filmed for the release of the single, directed by choreographer Kenny Ortega. In the clip, the sisters are seen getting ready for a formal party at a high society club. Anita Pointer is shown dressing and applying make up; Ruth Pointer, wearing only a nightgown, is shown rolling around on her bed and throwing her garments around; and June Pointer is taking a bubble bath. Once the sisters arrive at the club, they are photographed, attracting the attention of the other party goers. By the video's end, they have the club on its feet jamming to the song. In the video, Dorian Harewood also appears.

== Personnel ==
- Anita Pointer – lead vocals
- Ruth Pointer – backing vocals
- June Pointer – backing vocals
- John Barnes – acoustic piano
- Michael Boddicker – synthesizer programming
- Greg Phillinganes – synthesizers
- William "Smitty" Smith – organ
- George Doering – guitar
- Lee Ritenour – guitar
- Nathan Watts – bass
- John "J.R." Robinson – drums
- Paulinho da Costa – percussion

=== Personnel (1983) ===
- Lead vocals: Anita Pointer
- Backing vocals: Ruth Pointer, June Pointer
- Drums: John "J.R." Robinson
- Percussion: Paulinho da Costa
- Keyboards, synthesizers: Michael Boddicker, Greg Phillinganes, William D. "Smitty" Smith
- Guitars: George Doering, Lee Ritenour
- Trumpet: Chuck Findley
- Trombone: Richard Hyde
- Saxophone: Jim Horn
- Programming: Michael Boddicker

== Charts ==
=== Weekly charts ===
Chart (1982–1983)	Peak position
Australia (Kent Music Report)	9
Sweden (Sverigetopplistan)	4
US Billboard Hot 100	30
US Billboard Hot Dance Club Play	28
US Billboard Hot R&B Singles	46

Chart (1984–1985)	Peak position
Belgium (Ultratop 50 Flanders)	23
Canadian RPM Top Singles	21
Irish Singles Chart	6
Netherlands (Dutch Top 40)	18
Netherlands (Single Top 100)	19
New Zealand (Recorded Music NZ)	29
UK (Official Charts Company)	11
US Billboard Hot 100	9
US Cash Box Top 100	10
US Billboard Adult Contemporary	25

Chart (2013–2025)	Peak position
Poland (Polish Airplay Top 100)	46
Slovenia Airplay (SloTop50)	20
Spain (PROMUSICAE)	23

=== Year end charts ===
Chart (1983)	Position
Australia (Kent Music Report)	89

Chart (1984)	Position
US Billboard Hot 100	76
US Cash Box	83

== Certifications ==
Region	Certification	Certified units/sales
Denmark (IFPI Danmark)	Platinum	90,000^{‡}
Germany (BVMI)	Gold	250,000^{‡}
New Zealand (RMNZ)	Platinum	30,000^{‡}
Spain (Promusicae)	Platinum	60,000^{‡}
United Kingdom (BPI)	Platinum	600,000^{‡}
^{‡} Sales+streaming figures based on certification alone.

== Cover versions ==
In 1998, Croatian singer Nina Badrić released her cover version that peaked at number one in Croatia. The Solid State dance remix version peaked at number four in Italy.

In 2001, Australian Big Brother season one contestant Sara-Marie Fedele teamed up with Australian girl group Sirens to record a cover version of "I'm So Excited", titled "I'm So Excited (The Bum Dance)". This cover was released through BMG Australia on October 15, 2001, as a CD single containing the original version, two remixes, and B-side "Feelin Free". The song reached number 12 on the Australian ARIA Singles Chart, spending four weeks in the top 50.

In 2004, Le Tigre record a cover version of this song for the album This Island.

== In popular culture ==
The song is featured in the chapter 2 of the mini series Deceptions (1985), Working Girl (1988), Hot Shots! Part Deux (1993) and The Nutty Professor (1996). The song was also featured in Saved by the Bell season 2 episode titled "Jessie's Song".

In 1991, Cadbury launched a TV ad campaign for Crunchie that made use of the song, which became one of the longest running advert campaigns in television history, continuing to be used up until 2008.

The songs appears in Drake & Josh in the season 3 episode "The Drake & Josh Inn" as sung by Helen (played by Yvette Nicole Brown).

The re-recorded version from Our Hits was used as the opening theme for the special Fight for the Fallen episode of AEW Dynamite on January 1, 2025, and was later used during the Anarchy in the Arena match at the promotion's 2025 Double or Nothing event.

The same re-recorded version is also featured on the tracklist for the 2011 video game Just Dance 3.

On 14 May 2026, it was sung and performed live, at the Eurovision Song Contest 2026 stage in Vienna, by the presenters Victoria Swarovski and Michael Ostrowski accompanied by many dancers.
