= Danny Sembello =

- Born: Daniel Bud Sembello; January 15, 1963; Philadelphia, Pennsylvania, U.S.
- Died: August 15, 2015 (aged 52) Schuylkill River, Philadelphia, U.S.
- Genres: R&B; soul; synth-pop; pop; funk
- Occupations: Songwriter; record producer; multi-instrumentalist
- Instruments: Keyboards; synthesizers; drums; percussion; guitar~bass
- Years active: 1981–2015
- Label: MCA

Daniel Bud Sembello (January 15, 1963 – August 15, 2015) was an American songwriter, record producer and multi-instrumentalist.

He produced recordings by artists including George Benson and Pebbles, and he had his compositions recorded by Chaka Khan, Jeffrey Osborne, Patti LaBelle (the hit single "Stir It Up"), Irene Cara, René & Angela, and The Pointer Sisters (the hit single "Neutron Dance"). In 1986, he won a Grammy Award for Best Score Soundtrack Album for a Motion Picture, Television or Other Visual Media, for his contributions to the Beverly Hills Cop soundtrack. He was the brother of Michael Sembello.

Danny Sembello drowned in the Schuylkill River near Philadelphia, on August 15, 2015. He was first reported missing after he went for a swim during a music festival in Manayunk.
