= Issa Pointer =

American singer (born 1978)

- Born: Issa Kuren Edwards; January 22, 1978 (age 48); California, U.S.
- Genres: R&B, soul, pop, dance, rock, jazz, country
- Occupation: Singer
- Instrument: Vocals
- Years active: 1994–present
- Labels: Motown, SBK, Universal (Japan), Sony, YMC, Madacy
- Member of: The Pointer Sisters

Issa Kuren Edwards (born January 22, 1978), known professionally as Issa Pointer, is an American singer and member of the vocal group the Pointer Sisters.

== Personal life ==
Born in 1978 Pointer is the daughter of the Pointer Sisters' member Ruth Pointer and former Temptations member Dennis Edwards, from their relationship in 1977.

She has a son.

== Career ==
Brought up under the guidance of her mother and her aunts, Pointer first ventured into music while on the road with the Pointer Sisters during the group's 1985 tour. Later on, she contributed to some songs with the group for various albums. In 2002, she started replacing group founder June Pointer, who left initially for drug problems and then was sick. Pointer permanently replaced her aunt in 2004; June died of lung cancer on April 11, 2006. Together with her mother and aunt Anita Pointer, the Pointers enjoyed a successful revival in Europe with their duet single with Natalia on a cover of Aretha Franklin and Annie Lennox's "Sisters Are Doin' It for Themselves", which reached number 2 on the charts in Belgium.
