= The Pointer Sisters =

American family R&B vocal group

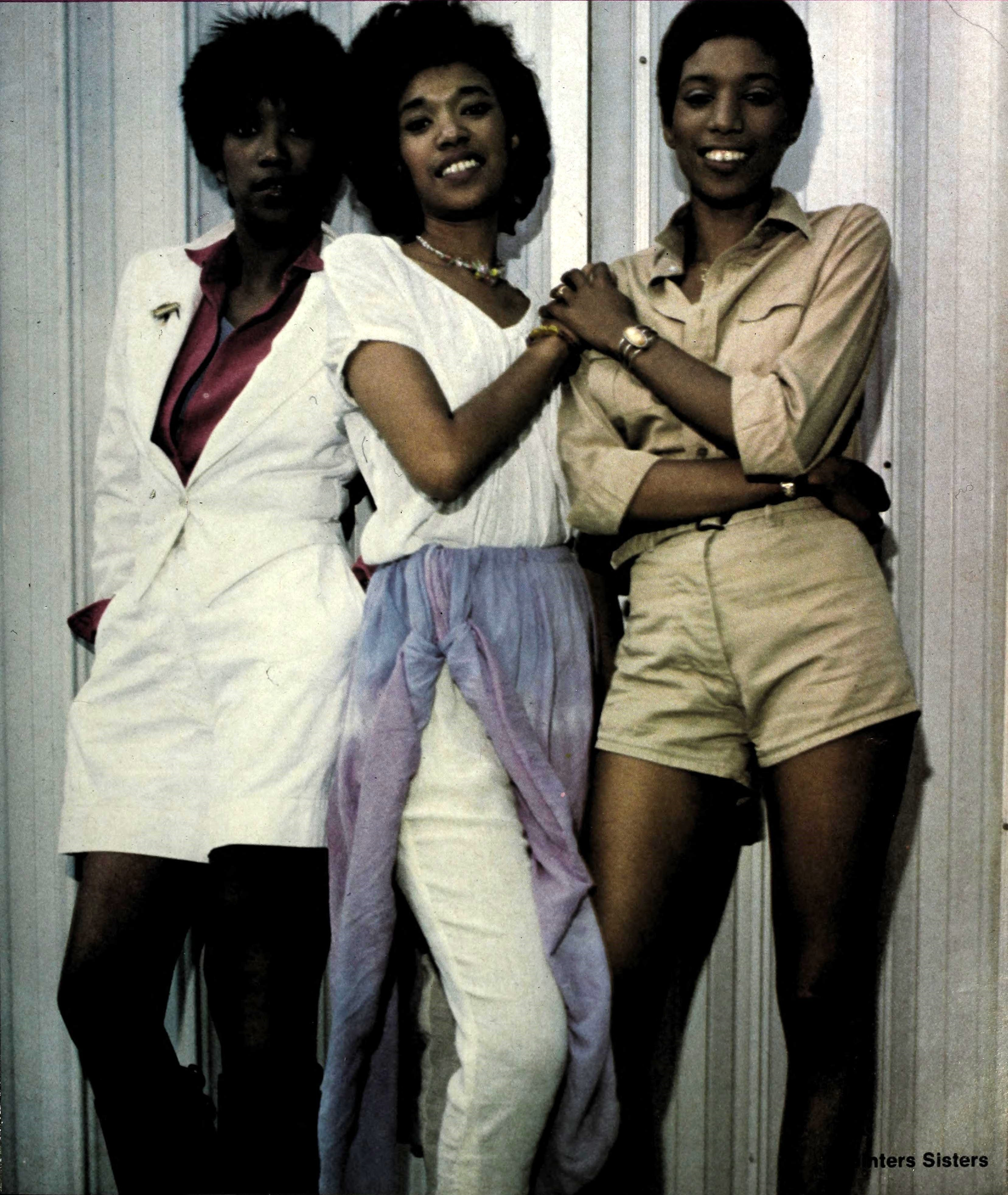
- The Pointer Sisters on the cover of Cash Box, January 27, 1979 (left to right: Ruth, Anita & June Pointer)

Background information
- Also known as: Pointers, Au Pair
- Origin: Oakland, California, U.S.
- Genres: R&B; soul; pop; dance; country
- Years active: 1969–present
- Labels: Blue Thumb; ABC; Planet; RCA; Motown; SBK; Atlantic
- Members: Ruth Pointer; Issa Pointer; Sadako Pointer
- Past members: June Pointer; Bonnie Pointer; Anita Pointer
- Website: thepointersisters.com

The Pointer Sisters are an American female vocal group from Oakland, California, who achieved mainstream success during the 1970s and 1980s, selling around 40 million records over the course of their career. Their repertoire spans many genres. The Pointer Sisters have won three Grammy Awards and received a star on the Hollywood Walk of Fame in 1994. The group had 13 US top 20 hits between 1973 and 1987.

The group had its origins when sisters June and Bonnie Pointer began performing in clubs in 1969 as "Pointers Au Pair". The line-up grew to a trio when sister Anita joined them. Their record deal with Atlantic Records produced several unsuccessful singles. The trio grew to a quartet when sister Ruth joined in December 1972. They then signed with Blue Thumb Records, recorded their debut album and, with their new label, began seeing more success, winning a Grammy Award in 1975 for Best Country Vocal Performance for "Fairytale" (1974). Bonnie left the group in 1977 to commence a solo career with modest success.

After signing with Richard Perry's independent label Planet Records, in 1978, the group achieved its greatest commercial success in the 1980s as a trio consisting of June, Ruth, and Anita. With Perry emphasizing electronic pop and dance stylings, they won two more Grammys in 1984 for the top 10 hits "Automatic" and "Jump (For My Love)". The group's other U.S. top 10 hits are "Fire" (1979), "He's So Shy" (1980), "Slow Hand" (1981), the remixed version of "I'm So Excited" (1984), and "Neutron Dance" (1985).

June, the youngest sister, suffered from drug addiction for several years, leaving the group in April 2004 prior to her death from cancer in April 2006, at the age of 52. She was replaced by Ruth's daughter Issa Pointer. This trio had a No. 2 hit in Belgium in 2005, covering "Sisters Are Doin' It for Themselves" with Belgian singer Natalia.

Between 2009 and 2015, the group consisted of Anita, Ruth, Issa, and Ruth's granddaughter Sadako Pointer. While all four women remained in the group, they most often performed as a trio rotating the lineup as needed. In 2015, Anita was forced to retire due to ill health, leaving Ruth the sole member of the original sibling lineup.

In December 2016, Billboard magazine ranked them as the 80th most successful dance artists of all time. In December 2017, Billboard ranked them as the 93rd most successful Hot 100 Artist of all time and as the 32nd most successful Hot 100 Women Artist of all time.

== History ==
=== Early days ===
As children in West Oakland, the Pointer sisters and brothers were encouraged to listen to and sing gospel music by their parents Reverend Elton and Sarah Pointer, both natives of Arkansas. However, they were told rock and roll and the blues were "the devil's music", and it was only when they were away from their watchful parents that they could sing these styles. They regularly sang at a local Church of God in Christ congregation in West Oakland, but as the sisters grew older their love of other styles of music began to grow.

The sisters were first cousins of NBA basketball player and head coach Paul Silas, and sisters of Aaron Pointer. Aaron was one of very few major league baseball players who became less famous than his own sisters; he later officiated in the National Football League for 17 seasons. The sisters graduated from Oakland Technical High School: Ruth in 1963, Anita in 1965, and Bonnie in 1968. After leaving school, oldest sister Ruth was already married with two children Faun (born 1965) and Malik (born 1966), Anita, the second-oldest sister, also was married with a child Jada. Bonnie, the third oldest sister, and June, the youngest, sought a show business career and they formed a duo, 'Pointers Au Pair'. Later, Anita quit her job to join the group. They began touring and performing and provided backing vocals for artists such as Grace Slick, Sylvester, Boz Scaggs, Taj Mahal, Elvin Bishop and Betty Davis.

It was while supporting Bishop at a nightclub appearance in 1971 that the sisters were signed to a recording contract with Atlantic Records. The resulting singles that came from their Atlantic tenure failed to become hits, but the sisters were enjoying their fledgling recording career. One recording has become a Northern Soul classic: "Send Him Back" (Atlantic 45 2893). Concentrated at Wigan Casino around 1973–1974, Northern soul was an underground music scene comprising American 45 rpm records released at the same time as Tamla Motown and imported into the United Kingdom. "Send Him Back" remains a favorite with the worldwide Northern soul audience. Ruth joined the group in December 1972. The quartet signed with Blue Thumb Records and began to record their first album.

In 1976, they were asked to record "Pinball Number Count" for Sesame Street, which was a series of educational cartoons teaching children how to count. It made its debut in 1977 and was a feature on the show for many years. They made their television debut performance at the Troubadour nightclub in Los Angeles on The Helen Reddy Show. In 1974, they joined Reddy on the track "Showbiz" which appeared on her Free and Easy album.

=== Initial success ===
The group's first album The Pointer Sisters, featuring the backing of Bay Area stalwarts the Hoodoo Rhythm Devils, was released in 1973 and received strong reviews, with the group being lauded for their versatility and originality. Its first single "Yes We Can Can" – an Allen Toussaint-penned song, which had been a minor R&B hit for Lee Dorsey in 1970 - afforded the Pointer Sisters the first chart hit reaching No. 11 on the Billboard Hot 100, while both "Yes We Can Can" and the follow-up single: the Willie Dixon cover "Wang Dang Doodle" were major R&B hits with respective R&B chart peaks of No. 12 and No. 24.

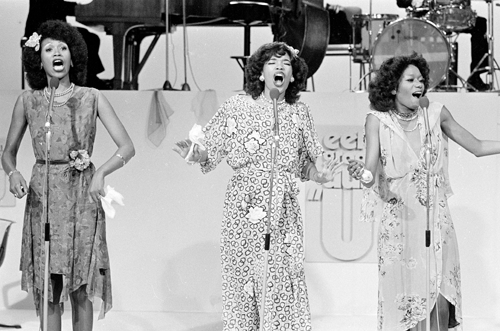
The Pointer Sisters (Ruth, Anita, and Bonnie) performing in September 1974

The Pointer Sisters' second album, the 1974 release That's a Plenty, continued in the jazz and be-bop style of its predecessor but provided one exception that caused a great deal of interest: "Fairytale", written by Anita and Bonnie, was a country song that reached No. 13 on the pop charts, and No. 37 on the country chart. Based on this success, the group was invited to Nashville, Tennessee where they achieved the distinction of becoming the first Black group to perform at the Grand Ole Opry. In 1975, the Pointer Sisters won a Grammy Award for Best Country Performance by a Duo or Group with Vocal, with Anita and Bonnie also receiving nominations for the Grammy Award for Best Country Song as songwriters of "Fairytale". The song was also recorded by Elvis Presley.

Subsequent to the live double album Live at the Opera House—a recording of April 21, 1974 Pointer Sisters concert at the War Memorial Opera House in San Francisco—the group's third studio album Steppin' was released in 1975. Steppin' produced their Grammy-nominated No. 1 R&B single, "How Long (Betcha' Got a Chick on the Side)", which was sampled by female rap icons Salt-N-Pepa a decade later and faithfully covered by Queen Latifah on her 2007 album "Travelin' Light". The Pointer Sisters also scored another R&B hit from the album with "Going Down Slowly", another Allen Toussaint cover, and in 1976 appeared in the classic film Car Wash with their song from the movie: "You Gotta Believe", making the R&B top 20 in early 1977.

The Pointer Sisters were featured on the 1977 album Saffo Music by Italian R&B singer Lara Saint Paul and produced by Leon Ware, with bass by Chuck Rainey, guitar by Ray Parker Jr. and mixed by Bill Conti. It was released in Italy under LASAPA records.

November 1977 saw the release of the jazz-funk oriented Having a Party which would be the final album release featuring the Pointer Sisters in their original four-woman format. It was only on the title cut that all four members sang; the album's other songs featured Anita, Bonnie, and Ruth, but not June, who had taken a break from the group at this time. Recorded in 1976 the album's release was so delayed as to cause an eighteen-month gap between Having a Party and the precedent Pointer Sisters' album Steppin'—the compilation album The Best of the Pointer Sisters had been issued in July 1976—and without the impetus of a major hit single the Having a Party album itself caused scant commercial interest.

=== Trio ===
By 1977, both June and Bonnie had left the group. June wanted to take a break, and Bonnie left to start a solo career. Bonnie married Motown Records producer Jeffrey Bowen in 1978. She subsequently signed a contract with Motown and this led to a brief, moderately successful, solo career. Her first self-titled album produced the disco song "Heaven Must Have Sent You". The album was produced by Berry Gordy and husband Jeffrey Bowen. The song became a top 20 pop hit in the US in September 1979.

On January 22, 1978, Ruth gave birth to her second daughter and, now a duo, Ruth and Anita cut back their schedules and concentrated on raising their families. They began talking about the future of the group and what direction it should take. They agreed to dispense with the 1940s nostalgia and go in a contemporary direction. In July of that year, June married William Oliver Whitmore II.

The three sisters then signed a deal with producer Richard Perry's Planet Records, which was distributed by Elektra Records. After contributing guest vocals on the group's cover of Sly Stone's "Everybody Is a Star", June had returned to the act, making it a trio. With Perry, the trio began working on an album of soft rock, which was released in 1978 with the title Energy. The first single, a cover version of Bruce Springsteen's "Fire", climbed to No. 2 on the US Billboard Hot 100 in early 1979, and a third Allen Toussaint cover, "Happiness", also charted.

In 1979, the trio released an album with a harder-edged rock sound, entitled Priority.

=== Height of success ===
Over the next few years, the Pointer Sisters achieved their greatest commercial success. In 1980, their single "He's So Shy", reached No. 3 on the chart, and the following year "Slow Hand" reached No. 2, as well as the UK Top Ten. The follow-up, "Should I Do It", featured a 1950s sound and became a major hit, peaking in the top 20 of the US Hot 100. Richard Perry then sold Planet to RCA Records in 1982. The group's next album after this merger would be So Excited!, which featured the singles "American Music", a patriotic-themed, modernized take on the girl-group sound, and an early version of "I'm So Excited". Both of these singles charted in the US and were also successful in Australia. The group also made an appearance on the sitcom Gimme a Break! in the episode "The Return of the Doo-Wop Girls".

In 1983, the Pointer Sisters released Break Out. With the advent of MTV, videos of the Pointer Sisters' songs began to be played in heavy rotation. In 1984, they achieved four US Billboard Hot 100 top 10 singles in a row. "Automatic" reached No. 5; "Jump (For My Love)" reached No. 3; a remix of "I'm So Excited" was added to the album almost a year into its shelf life and reached No. 9; and "Neutron Dance", also featured on the Beverly Hills Cop soundtrack, reached No. 6.

"I Need You" had been the lead single from the album, and was a significant R&B hit, peaking at No. 13 on the R&B chart and also becoming a moderate Hot 100 hit. The album's sixth and final single, "Baby Come and Get It", became a moderate Hot 100 hit and R&B hit. They received Grammy Awards for Best Pop Performance by a Duo or Group with Vocal for "Jump (For My Love)" and Best Vocal Arrangement for Two or More Voices for "Automatic". This would be the first Pointer Sisters album to feature six singles. The group later performed on the charity hit song "We Are The World" along with other major American recording acts.

In 1984, Ruth became a grandmother for the second time.

These Planet Records singles marked the end of their run of Top 10 hits in the US, although they did score a major hit with their subsequent RCA Records song "Dare Me", which reached No. 11 in 1985. That song would also be the group's last Australian top 10 hit. Another single, "Goldmine", reached No. 33 on the US Hot 100 in 1986.

The Pointer Sisters backed the actor Bruce Willis on a cover of the song "Respect Yourself" in December 1986; the single rose to number 5 on the Hot 100 under Willis's name only, with the sisters uncredited. June Pointer was featured in the song's music video. In 1987, the Pointer Sisters starred in an NBC primetime special titled "Up All Nite", which opened with footage of them performing "Jump" at one of their concerts, and which then followed the trio as they socialized and performed around the L.A. night scene. The special, which featured guest appearances by Willis, the McGuire Sisters, and Whoopi Goldberg, was also nominated for a Primetime Emmy Award. The sisters also were featured in a lavish Diet Coke commercial, which aired during the program, and which presented them singing a soulful jingle about the soda.

The sisters eventually left RCA Records to record for Motown Records and SBK Records, releasing several group albums but these albums did not achieve the level of success of their earlier releases.

=== Later years ===
Ruth became a grandmother as "Break Out" reached success; Anita became a grandmother in 1990 when her only child Jada gave birth to Roxie. On September 8, 1990, Ruth married a man named Michael Sayles (born 1957). The sisters entertained US troops in the Persian Gulf in 1991 with Bob Hope. By 1991, June had ended her thirteen-year marriage to William Oliver Whitmore II. In August 1993 at age 47 Ruth gave birth to twins Ali and Conor Sayles. 1994 saw the release of the Various Artists album Rhythm, Country and Blues which featured duets of country artists with R&B artists. This album contains a duet with the Pointer Sisters and Clint Black together on the classic song "Chain of Fools".

Also in 1994, the Pointer Sisters were honored with a star on the Hollywood Walk of Fame and began touring with a production of the Fats Waller-based musical Ain't Misbehavin'. In 1995 Pointer Sisters recorded "Feel for the Physical" as a duet with Thomas Anders (of Modern Talking fame) for his album Souled. They were also one of the featured acts at the closing ceremony of the 1996 Summer Olympics in Atlanta.

In 1995–1996, the Pointer Sisters returned to their original jazzy incarnation touring nationally in Ain't Misbehavin'. During this tour issues with June came to the fore as she missed many performances. Understudy Wendy Edmead replaced her on these occasions. In 2002, Ruth's daughter Issa Pointer began performing with the Pointer Sisters in June's stead. On June 9, 2002, June and Bonnie performed as a duo on the bill at the San Jose Gay Pride Celebration the pair having been recruited by a promoter who had failed to recruit the official Pointer Sisters trio for the event.

The June/Bonnie appearance at San Jose Pride was promoted as a "Pointer Sisters" gig, with pictures of June performing with Anita and Ruth utilized in its promotion, causing Anita and Ruth to sue the promoter and other affiliates of the San Jose Pride gig. Neither Bonnie nor June was named in the suit. Bonnie and June performed as a duo at other Gay Pride celebrations and participated in the Get Up 'n' Dance disco music tour in the summer of 2003, the duo being officially billed as "Bonnie and June Pointer, formerly of the Pointer Sisters".

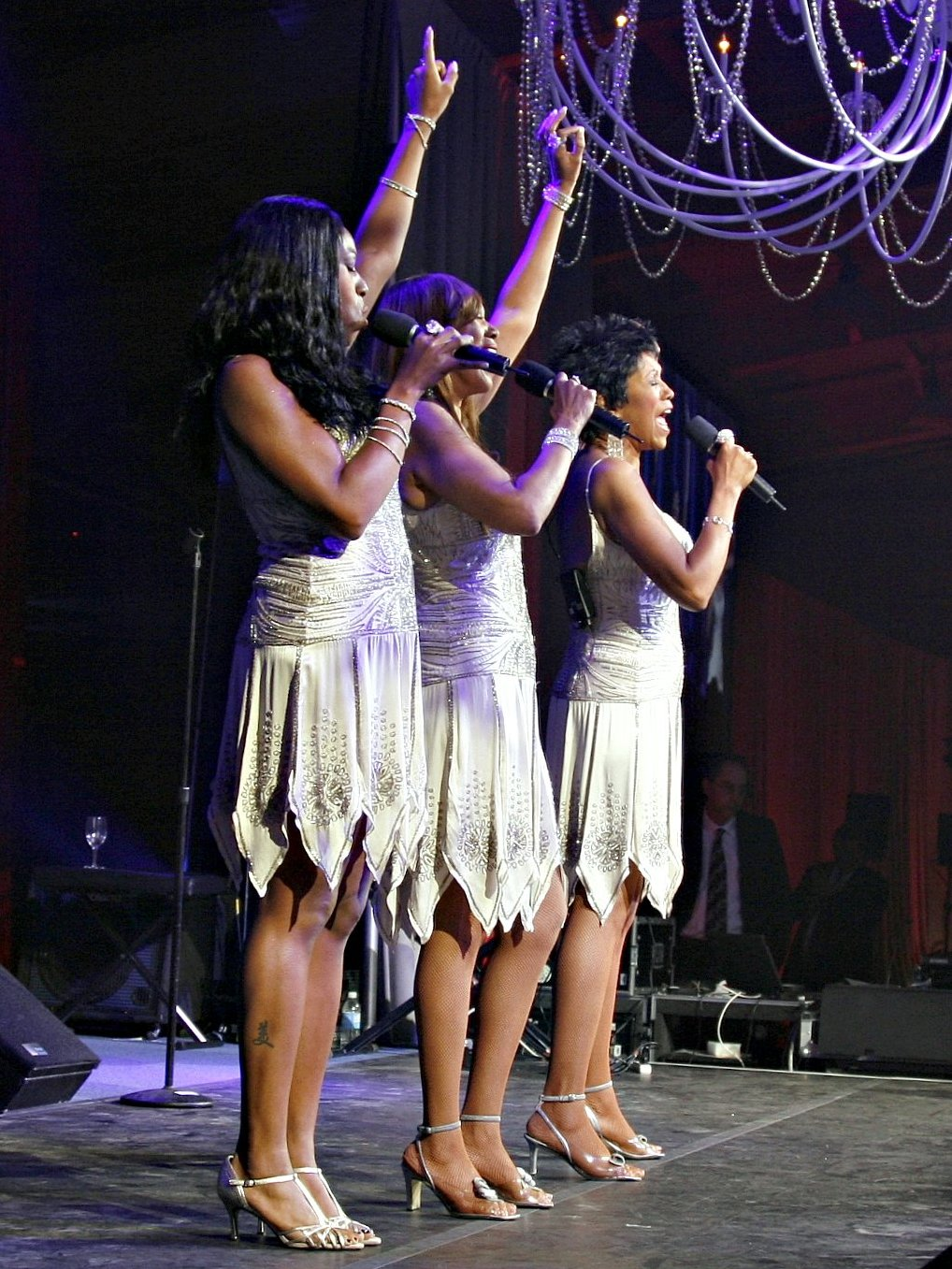
The Pointer Sisters in a performance for cancer research in November 2006

In fall 2002, the Pointer Sisters played the Night of the Proms tour in Europe marking the inauguration of Issa Pointer, the daughter of Ruth, as the replacement for June. Ruth would recall: "We sort of pulled a fast one by waiting until the last minute to inform the promoters of [the] roster change...because we didn't want to give them the chance to change their minds." She also said, "Anita and I had talked for some time about having Issa and [Anita's] daughter Jada alternate in the third spot in the lineup...Issa was chosen [to go] first because she had experience singing solo at a lot of New England-area functions." Issa's membership in the Pointer Sisters would remain constant until 2009, Jada having been diagnosed with pancreatic cancer in the autumn of 2002 and dying June 10, 2003.

The Pointer Sisters recorded their first album with Issa rather than June in April 2004 with The Pointer Sisters - Live in Billings recorded at the Alberta Bair Theatre in Billings, Montana. The first studio recording by the Pointer Sisters to feature Issa was "Christmas in New York" for YMC Records recorded in the summer of 2005 for release for the multi-artist seasonal release Smooth & Soulful Christmas Collection on YMC Records: "Christmas in New York" afforded the Pointer Sisters their last appearance on a Billboard chart to date, the track reaching No. 21 on the Billboard Adult Contemporary chart. Christmas In New York was written by Nathan East and Chris Christian and produced by them.

The group's next recording was a remake of the Eurythmics' "Sisters Are Doin' It for Themselves" recorded with Natalia: this track spent sixteen weeks in the Top 20 of Belgium's Flemish chart from October 2005 with a peak of No. 2. In 2008, Anita and Ruth recorded the last Pointer Sisters album to date The Pointer Sisters Favorites consisting of remakes of ten of the group's biggest hits: recorded in response to the group's failure to receive royalties from the inclusion of any Pointer Sisters' hits on multi-artist hits compilations, "...Favorites" was sold exclusively at the group's live gigs and at the website ThePointerSisters.com, but was added to iTunes in 2013.

In recent years, many Pointer Sisters songs have been covered by contemporary artists, such as "Jump (For My Love)" by Girls Aloud, which reached No. 2 at the UK singles chart in 2003, "Dare Me" was turned into the dance smash "Stupidisco" by Belgian DJ Junior Jack, indie band Le Tigre covered in 2004 "I'm So Excited" on their third album This Island, and French DJ Muttonheads sampled "Back in My Arms" on his 2005 club hit "I'll Be There". In 2005, "Pinball Number Count" was re-edited for Coldcut's Ninja Tune label, becoming a surprise dance hit. The same song has also been sampled by Venetian Snares of the Planet Mu record label. Most recently in 2007, Tommy Boy recording artist Ultra Naté has released a dance-pop cover of "Automatic" that reached No. 1 at the US Hot Dance Music/Club Play charts. The same year, How Long (Betcha' Got a Chick on the Side) was faithfully covered by Queen Latifah on her 2007 album "Travelin' Light".

On June 7, 2006, Anita guest-starred on Celebrity Duets singing with Olympic gymnast Carly Patterson on "I'm So Excited": on the following night's results show the duo's encore was "Jump (For My Love)".

On August 4, 2009, Ruth, Anita and Bonnie stopped by The Kibitz Room at Canter's in Los Angeles and jammed with the band and Ruth's son Malik. They sang "Fire", "Yes We Can Can", and "Going Down Slowly". On November 4, 2009, the Pointer Sisters played "I'm So Excited" and "Neutron Dance" on CBS morning show The Early Show with Ruth's granddaughter, Sadako Johnson. Issa is currently pursuing a solo career.

While promoting an October 28, 2010, Detroit gig by the Pointer Sisters –then comprising Anita and Ruth and Sadako Pointer Johnson — Ruth Pointer, asked "Do you [and Anita] plan on recording an album with Sadako?", replied: "Hmm...not really. We talk about it from time to time, but the business has changed so much. It's not like the old days when you just have a record deal and go in the studio and record with a producer and then start promoting." In the same interview Ruth commented on the Pointer Sisters' profile having dropped in recent years: "We've performed a lot in Europe and Asia and Australia, and it's just that we haven't been very visible publicly in the [US]. We still do a lot of corporate parties and private parties because I mean, let's face it, those are the people that are in our own age group and know our songs."

In November 2011, the Pointer Sisters toured Australia and played one gig in New Zealand with a lineup consisting of Ruth, Sadako Johnson and Issa; the last-named was a last-minute and presumably temporary replacement for Anita, who did not feel up to travel due to an unnamed health concern. Ruth, Sadako Johnson and Issa were the personnel for a February 11, 2012 Pointer Sisters concert in Metairie, Louisiana. At the July 6, 2012 Essence Fest show in New Orleans, Anita had rejoined the group, the lineup for that concert being Ruth, Anita and Sadako Johnson.

In an August 2012 interview Ruth stated: "Anita has had some health issues recently so we try to give her a break when she needs it. When that happens we bring my daughter [Issa] in to fill in for her." At a later Pointer Sisters concert, performing with the Columbus Symphony on June 14, 2013 (and filling in for Chaka Khan with a week's notice), the lineup was Anita, Ruth and Issa Pointer.

The Pointer Sisters were scheduled to play six Australian dates in May and June 2016 with the lineup of Ruth, Issa and Sadako Johnson. Media reports indicated that Anita's health issues necessitated her retiring from the group. In a February 25, 2016 interview with News.com.au, Ruth said of the Pointer Sisters recent live performance history: "I'm almost inclined to call [the group's live engagements] pop-up engagements, not tours. We don't do the tours like we used to do back in the day. We'll leave that to the young folks, out on the road in buses for months at a time....We still have a good time, we do a lot of corporate dates, a lot of casinos, special events, fundraisers, that's our audience. We're so glad [the Pointer Sisters's songs are] still relevant and people still want to hear them being sung and we love singing them."

The Pointer Sisters were inducted into the Vocal Group Hall of Fame in 2005.

== Personal lives ==
In November 2000, the sisters lost their mother, Sarah.

In 2003, sister Anita lost her only child Jada to cancer. Jada was the subject of the 1973 song "Jada".

On April 11, 2006, June, who suffered from drug addiction, died of cancer at the age of 52. According to a family statement, she was surrounded by Ruth and Anita as well as brothers Aaron and Fritz. On May 4, 2006, Bonnie appeared on Entertainment Tonight saying the other sisters had not fulfilled June's burial wishes, instead having her cremated because it was cheaper. Bonnie also stated the sisters had not let her ride in the family car at the funeral. Anita and Ruth responded that Bonnie had demanded to rejoin the group and was upset that she had been rejected, and that June had left no instructions for her burial. The sisters seemed estranged from Bonnie until she joined Anita on the Idol Radio Show in 2007.

Bonnie was arrested for allegedly possessing crack cocaine on November 18, 2011, in South Los Angeles, after the car she was riding in was pulled over for a mechanical malfunction. She filed for divorce from Motown Records producer, Jeffrey Bowen, on July 1, 2014. On June 8, 2020, she died at her home in Los Angeles at the age of 69.

Anita died from cancer on December 31, 2022.

== Members ==
=== Current members ===
- Ruth Pointer (1972–present)
- Issa Pointer (2002–2009, 2011–present)
- Sadako Pointer (2009–present)

=== Former members ===
- Anita Pointer (1969–2015; died 2022)
- Bonnie Pointer (1969–1977, one-off in 2009; died 2020)
- June Pointer (1969–1977, 1978–2002; died 2006)

== Discography ==
Studio albums

- The Pointer Sisters (1973)
- That's a Plenty (1974)
- Steppin' (1975)
- Having a Party (1977)
- Energy (1978)
- Priority (1979)
- Special Things (1980)
- Black & White (1981)
- So Excited! (1982)
- Break Out (1983)
- Contact (1985)
- Hot Together (1986)
- Serious Slammin' (1988)
- Right Rhythm (1990)
- Only Sisters Can Do That (1993)

== Awards ==
=== Grammy Awards ===
The Grammy Awards are awarded annually by the National Academy of Recording Arts and Sciences. The Pointer Sisters have received three awards from ten nominations.

Year	Nominated work	Award	Result
1974	"Fairytale"	Best Country Vocal Performance by a Duo or Group	Won
1976	"How Long (Betcha' Got a Chick on the Side)"	Best R&B Vocal Performance by a Duo, Group or Chorus	Nominated
1976	"Live Your Life Before You Die"	Best Country Vocal Performance by a Duo or Group	Nominated
1981	"He's So Shy"	Best Pop Performance by a Duo or Group with Vocal	Nominated
1982	"Slow Hand"	Best Pop Performance by a Duo or Group with Vocal	Nominated
1982	Black & White	Best R&B Performance by a Duo or Group with Vocal	Nominated
1985	"Jump (For My Love)"	Best Pop Performance by a Duo or Group with Vocal	Won
1985	"Automatic"	Best Vocal Arrangement for Two or More Voices	Won
1986	Contact	Best R&B Performance by a Duo or Group with Vocal	Nominated
1987	So Excited	Best Music Video, Short Form	Nominated

Notes:
- Anita Pointer and Bonnie Pointer received an additional nomination as songwriters when "Fairytale" was nominated for the Grammy Award for Best Country Song.
- Nomination for Best Music Video, Short Form shared with producer/director Richard Perry.

=== American Music Awards ===
The American Music Awards is an annual awards ceremony created by Dick Clark in 1973. The Pointer Sisters have received three awards from four nominations.

Year	Nominated work	Award	Result
1982	The Pointer Sisters	Favorite Band, Duo or Group (Pop/Rock)	Nominated
1985	The Pointer Sisters	Favorite Band, Duo or Group (Soul/R&B)	Won
1985	The Pointer Sisters	Favorite Group Video Artist (Soul/R&B)	Won
1986	The Pointer Sisters	Favorite Group Video Artist (Soul/R&B)	Won

== See also ==
- List of artists who reached number one on the Billboard R&B chart
- List of number-one dance hits (United States)
- List of artists who reached number one on the U.S. dance chart
