= June Pointer =

American singer (1953–2006)

Background information
- Born: June Antoinette Pointer; November 30, 1953; Oakland, California, U.S.
- Died: April 11, 2006 (aged 52) Santa Monica, California, U.S.
- Genres: R&B; pop; soul; dance
- Occupation: Singer
- Instrument: Vocals
- Years active: 1969–2004
- Labels: Atlantic; Blue Thumb; ABC; Planet; RCA; Columbia; Motown; SBK
- Formerly of: The Pointer Sisters
- Website: thepointersisters.com

June Antoinette Pointer (November 30, 1953 – April 11, 2006) was an American singer, best known as the youngest of the founding members of the vocal group the Pointer Sisters.

== Early life and career ==
Born the youngest of six children to minister parents Reverend Elton and Sarah Pointer, June shared a love of singing with her sisters. In 1969, she and sister Bonnie founded the duo Pointers, A Pair. June and Bonnie sang at numerous clubs, then became a trio later that year when sister Anita quit her job as a secretary, wanting to join the group. The group officially changed its name to the Pointer Sisters. The trio signed a record deal with Atlantic Records and released a few singles, none of which made a substantial impact on the music charts. In 1972, sister Ruth wanted to join the group, now making it a quartet. The four then signed with Blue Thumb Records. As a trio the group had made several previous singles, and now as a quartet they would record their first album.

== The Pointer Sisters and solo career ==
Releasing their debut album The Pointer Sisters in 1973, the group found success with hits such as "Yes We Can Can" and "Wang Dang Doodle". Subsequent albums boasted hits such as "Fairytale", "How Long (Betcha Got a Chick on the Side)" and "You Gotta Believe". June left the group in November 1975, having been advised to retire because of physical and mental exhaustion. Bonnie then left the group in 1977 to start a solo career. June had considered returning to the group but decided not to since Bonnie had departed.

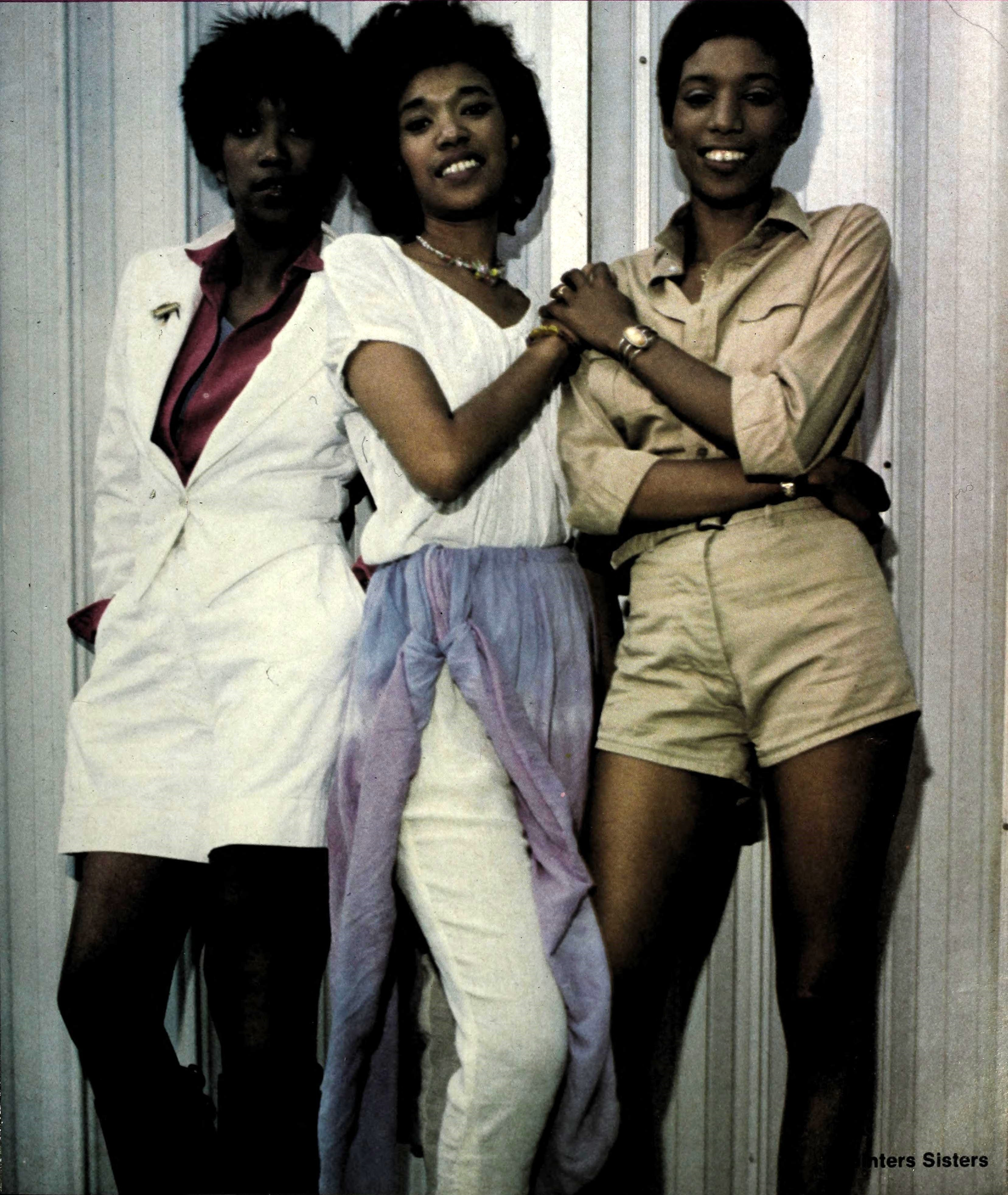
The Pointer Sisters on the cover of Cash Box, January 27, 1979. (From left: Ruth, Anita and June)

Upon June's return, the remaining sisters found huge success, reaching the Top 10 in early 1979 with a cover of Bruce Springsteen's "Fire"; this time began a string of hits that included "Happiness", "He's So Shy" (1980), "Slow Hand" (1981), "American Music", "Should I Do It" and "I'm So Excited". In 1983, the group released Break Out, their biggest album to date. It included the top 10 hits "Automatic"; "Jump (For My Love)"; a re-release of "I'm So Excited", which became a bigger hit than when originally released in 1982; and "Neutron Dance". Subsequent albums spawned hits such as "Dare Me", "Freedom" and "Goldmine". June sang lead vocals on several of the group's biggest singles, including "Happiness", "He's So Shy", "Should I Do It", "Jump (For My Love)", "Baby Come and Get It" and "Dare Me".

Eventually, June ventured into a solo career while staying with the Pointer Sisters. Her album Baby Sister was released in 1983, scoring a modest R&B hit with the song "Ready for Some Action" (US R&B #28). Her second solo album June Pointer was released in 1989, with the R&B charting single "Tight on Time (Fit U In)" (US R&B #70). She also performed the song "Little Boy Sweet" for the 1983 film National Lampoon's Vacation. In December 1986, she was featured in a music video with Bruce Willis singing a cover of the Staples Singers' song "Respect Yourself"; the song peaked at number 5 on the Hot 100 under Willis's name alone, despite the prominence of the Pointer Sisters on the track. She posed for Playboy in 1985. In September 1994, the Pointer Sisters received a star on the Hollywood Walk of Fame.

== Personal life ==
Pointer was married to William Oliver Whitmore II from 1978 until 1991. She had no children. She was addicted to cocaine for much of her career, and she was ousted from the Pointer Sisters in 2004. On April 22, 2004, she was charged with felony cocaine possession and misdemeanor possession of a smoking device. She was ordered to a rehabilitation facility.

== Death ==
On February 27, 2006, Pointer suffered a stroke. While hospitalized, she was diagnosed with end-stage gastric cancer, which had metastasized to her pancreas, bones, liver and lungs. She died at UCLA Medical Center in Santa Monica, California on April 11, 2006, at the age of 52. A family statement said Pointer died "in the arms of her sisters Ruth and Anita and her brothers Aaron and Fritz by her side". Pointer's funeral was held at the Church of the Hills in Forest Lawn Memorial Park in Los Angeles. Pointer was cremated, and her ashes were buried at Mt. Tamalpais Cemetery in San Rafael, California.

== Discography ==
=== Solo ===
- Baby Sister (1983, Planet Records)
- June Pointer (1989, Columbia Records)

Pointer recorded a duet with Dionne Warwick, "Heartbreak of Love", for Warwick's 1987 album Reservations for Two. Their duet later appeared on the B-side of Warwick's 1989 single "Take Good Care of You and Me".
