= Planet Records =

American record label

- Parent company: Sony Music Entertainment
- Founded: 1978
- Founder: Richard Perry
- Status: Defunct
- Distributors: Elektra Records/ Asylum Records (United States and Canada) (1978-1982); WEA Discos (Brazil, South America, Central America, Mexico and Caribbean) (1978-1982); RCA Victor (1982-1985)
- Genre: Various
- Country of origin: U.S.

Planet Records was an American record label founded in 1978 by record producer Richard Perry. It was distributed by Elektra/Asylum Records until 1982, when Perry sold it to RCA Records.

== Label history ==
=== Beginnings ===
The label was founded in 1978 by Perry as a side vehicle for showcasing new talent he was nurturing while he was still producing existing artists for other record labels. The first act signed to the label was the Pointer Sisters, who became the label's biggest sellers. Other acts on the label included Bill Medley, Greg Phillinganes, the Plimsouls and American Noise.

Logo designed by John Kosh

=== Acquisition by RCA Records ===
Perry sold Planet Records to RCA Records in 1982, which operated it as a subsidiary label through late 1985, when it was liquidated. After the demise of the label, records by the Pointer Sisters, Phillinganes and Medley all appeared on the RCA Victor label. The remaining artists on Planet's roster did not have their contracts renewed.

== Artists ==
- American Noise
- The Cretones
- Swing
- Marva King
- Bill Medley
- Night
- Greg Phillinganes
- The Plimsouls
- The Pointer Sisters
- June Pointer
- Sue Saad and the Next
- Mark Saffan and the Keepers

== Discography ==
- P-1 - Energy - Pointer Sisters
- P-2 - Night - Night
- P-3 - Night - Night (reissue of P-2 with added track)
- P-4 - Sue Saad and The Next - Sue Saad and The Next
- P-5 - Thin Red Line - The Cretones
- P-6 - Sharp Cuts: New Music from American Bands - Various Artists
- P-8 - American Noise - American Noise
- P-9 - Special Things - Pointer Sisters
- P-10 - Long Distance - Night
- P-12 - Mark Saffan and The Keepers - Mark Saffan and The Keepers
- P-13 - The Plimsouls - The Plimsouls
- P-15 - Snap! Snap! - The Cretones
- P-16 - Feels Right - Marva King
- P-17 - Significant Gains - Greg Phillinganes
- P-18 - Black & White - Pointer Sisters
- P-24 - Swing - Swing
- P-9001 - The Champ (soundtrack) - Various Artists
- P-9002 - Voices (soundtrack) - Various Artists
- P-9003 - Priority - Pointer Sisters
- E1-60206 - Greatest Hits - Pointer Sisters
- BXL1-4355 - So Excited! - Pointer Sisters
- BXL1-4426 - The Good Times Are Back - Full Swing
- BXL1-4434 - Right Here and Now - Bill Medley
- BXL1-4508 - Baby Sister - June Pointer
- BXL1-4698 - Pulse - Greg Phillinganes
- BXL1-4705 - Break Out - Pointer Sisters
- BXL1-4705A - Break Out - Pointer Sisters (reissue with a remix of "I'm So Excited" replacing "Nightline")

== See also ==
- List of record labels
