= Anita Pointer =

American singer and songwriter (1948–2022)

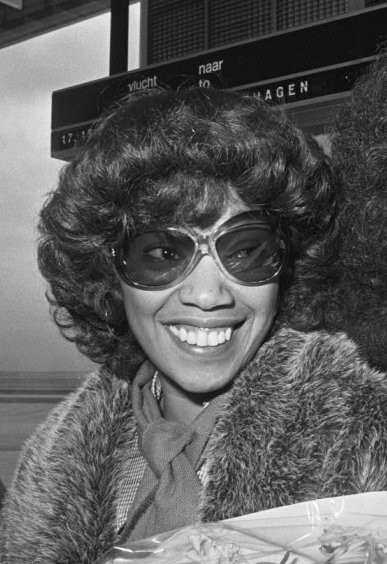
- Pointer in 1974

Background information
- Born: Anita Marie Pointer; January 23, 1948; Oakland, California, U.S.
- Died: December 31, 2022 (aged 74) Beverly Hills, California, U.S.
- Genres: R&B; soul; pop; dance
- Occupation: Singer-songwriter
- Instrument: Vocals
- Years active: 1969–2015
- Labels: Atlantic; Blue Thumb; ABC; Planet; RCA; Motown; SBK
- Formerly of: The Pointer Sisters

Anita Marie Pointer (January 23, 1948 – December 31, 2022) was an American singer and songwriter, best known as a founding member of the vocal group the Pointer Sisters. She co-wrote and was the lead singer on their hit song "Fairytale", which garnered them their first Grammy Award in 1975. She was also the lead singer on many of their other hits, including "Yes We Can Can", "Fire", "Slow Hand", and "I'm So Excited".

== Early life and family ==
Pointer was born in Oakland, California, on January 23, 1948, as the fourth of six children to Sarah Elizabeth (née Silas; 1924–2000) and Reverend Elton Pointer (1901–1979). Though she was born in California, Pointer's parents were natives of Arkansas. As a result, her family traveled by car almost yearly from California to Arkansas to visit Pointer's grandparents who lived in Prescott.

During that time, her mother allowed her to stay with her grandparents to attend fifth grade at McRae Elementary, seventh grade at McRae Jr. High, and tenth grade at McRae High School. While in Prescott, she played alto sax as a member of the McRae High School band. In 1969, Pointer quit her job as a secretary to join her younger sisters Bonnie and June to form the Pointer Sisters. Their sister Ruth joined the group in 1972.

== Career ==
Pointer and her sisters found fame in 1973, when she sang lead on "Yes We Can Can", which reached No. 11 on the Billboard Hot 100. In 1974, Pointer's writing talents helped the group make music history when "Fairytale" became a hit on the country music charts and enabled the Pointer Sisters to become the first black female group to perform at the Grand Ole Opry. "Fairytale", written by Pointer and her sister Bonnie and featuring Pointer on lead vocals, earned the group its first Grammy Award, winning Best Country Performance by a Duo or Group and receiving a Grammy nomination for the Best Country Song of the year in 1975.

In the late 1970s and early 1980s, the Pointer Sisters rose to higher levels of success. Pointer was the lead singer on many of their hits, including "Fire" (1978) and "Slow Hand" (1981), which both reached No. 2 on the Billboard pop chart, and "I'm So Excited" (1982), which spent 40 weeks on the chart. She sang backup on other hits, with June leading "Jump (For My Love)", which won the 1985 Grammy for Best Pop Performance by a Duo or Group with Vocals, and "Automatic" featuring Ruth as lead and winning the Grammy for Best Vocal Arrangement for Two or More Voices, also in 1985. Both songs were from the 1983 album Break Out, which reached triple-platinum status. Other Pointer Sisters' hits included "He's So Shy" (1980) and "Neutron Dance" (1984), which was popularized in the opening scene of the film Beverly Hills Cop. From 1973 to 1985, they had 13 top-20 pop hits in the United States.

In 1986, Pointer found chart success with country superstar Earl Thomas Conley on the song "Too Many Times", which reached No. 2 on the country chart. In 1987, she released her first solo album, Love for What It Is. Her album's first single, "Overnight Success", reached No. 41 on the Billboard R&B chart. A second single from the album, More Than a Memory, also charted, reaching No. 73 R&B in 1988.

In 1994, Pointer and her sisters received a star on the Hollywood Walk of Fame, and in 1998, Pointer was singularly inducted into the Arkansas Black Hall of Fame. In 2015, she retired from the Pointer Sisters after medical issues following chemotherapy.

In February 2020, Pointer released the book, Fairytale: The Pointer Sisters' Family Story which was co-written with her brother, Fritz Pointer. The book chronicles the Pointer family origins and history as well as finding themselves as young black women in the San Francisco Bay Area during the civil rights and Black Power movement of the late 1960s. As well, it describes the difficulties and successes they encountered throughout their career and shares their chart history, discography and other surprises along the way. Throughout the book, family members also share their memories of the Pointer family history including Bonnie, who died that same year in June. The book earned positive reviews upon release.

== Personal life ==
Pointer was married several times and had one child. In December 1965, at age 17, Pointer married David Harper. They had a daughter, Jada Rashawn Pointer, born April 9, 1966. They divorced later in 1966. Jada Pointer died of cancer in 2003, aged 37.

Pointer was briefly in a relationship with NFL football player Thomas "Hollywood" Henderson.

Her daughter inspired one of the Pointer Sisters' most popular songs, "Jada", written by the group and released on their debut album in 1973. In October 1981, Pointer married Richard Gonzalez. The two later divorced.

Pointer's older brother, Aaron Pointer, was a Major League Baseball player and later a referee in the National Football League. Her cousin Paul Silas was a National Basketball Association player and head coach.

=== Health and death ===
In October 2021, Pointer was supposed to be a contestant on season 6 of The Masked Singer, as part of a duet with her sister Ruth, when the show revealed that Pointer had not been able to perform because she was dealing with an illness.

Pointer died from cancer at her home in Beverly Hills, California, on December 31, 2022, aged 74.

== Discography ==
=== Studio albums ===
- Love for What It Is (1987)

=== Singles ===
Year	Single	US R&B	Album
1987	"Overnight Success"	41	Love for What It Is
1988	"More Than a Memory"	73	Love for What It Is

=== Guest singles ===
Year	Single	Artist	Chart Positions		Album
Year	Single	Artist	US Country	CAN Country	Album
1986	"Too Many Times"	Earl Thomas Conley	2	3	Too Many Times

Soundtracks

- 1996: The Associate
