= Ruth Pointer =

American singer (born 1946)

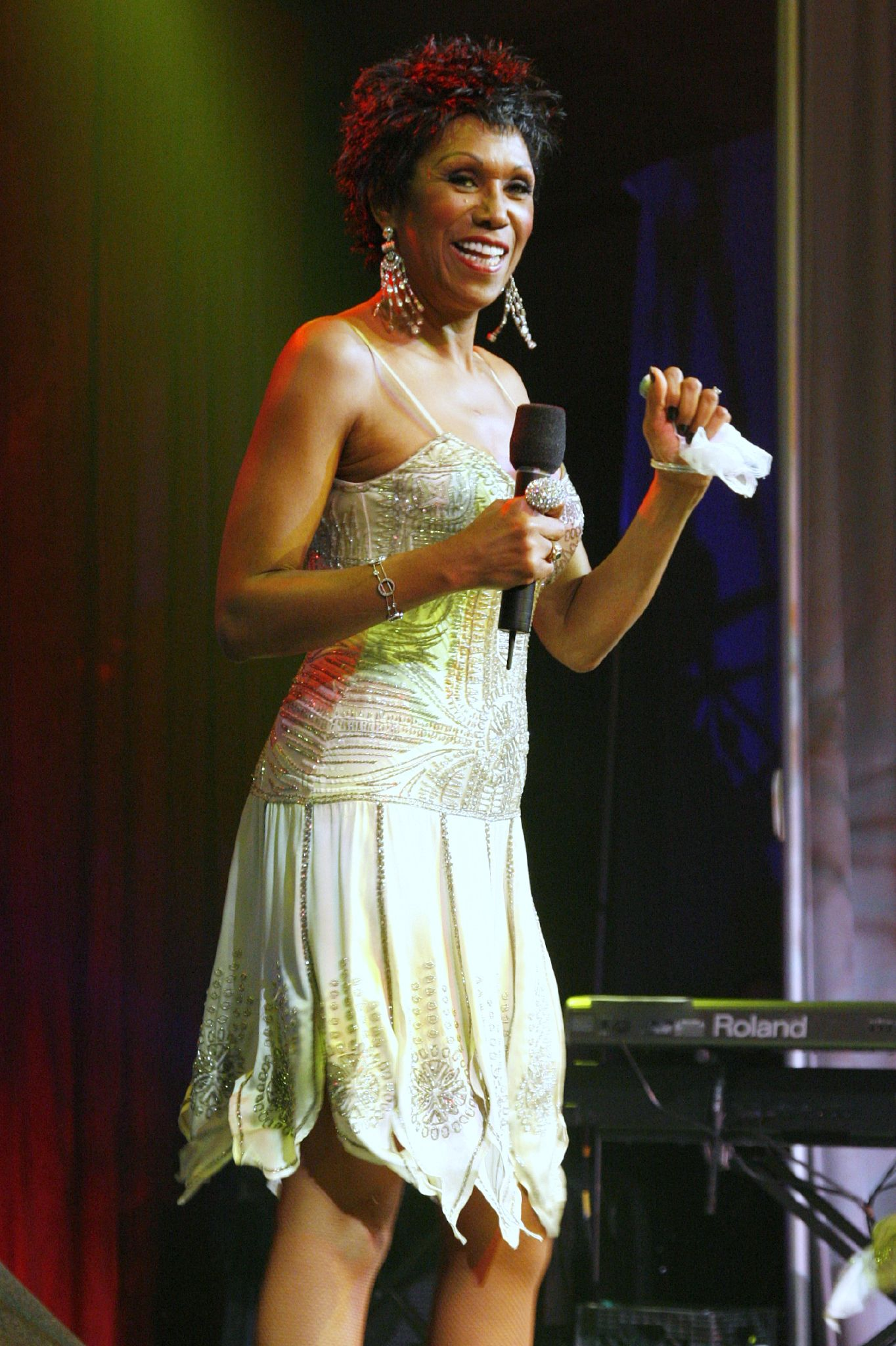
- Pointer performing with the Pointer Sisters at the Komen Center Pink Tie Ball in 2006

Background information
- Born: Ruth Esther Pointer; March 19, 1946 (age 80); Oakland, California, U.S.
- Genres: R&B; pop; funk; dance
- Occupations: Singer; songwriter
- Years active: 1966–present
- Member of: The Pointer Sisters
- Website: thepointersisters.com/ruth.html

Ruth Esther Pointer (born March 19, 1946) is an American singer best known as the eldest member of the family vocal group the Pointer Sisters. Pointer joined her sisters in 1972 to make the group a quartet.

Pointer wrote a memoir about the group, Still So Excited!: My Life as a Pointer Sister, published in 2016. She is the last living member of the original family of sisters, but she continues to perform in the Pointer Sisters vocal group with her daughter Issa and her granddaughter Sadako.

== Career ==
Joining her sisters in 1972, the Pointer Sisters released their first album in 1973. The group eventually found fame with songs like "Yes We Can Can" (1973), their country crossover hit, "Fairytale" (1974) and "How Long (Betcha Got a Chick on the Side)" before Bonnie's exit in 1977. Continuing as a trio, the group found their biggest success covering tunes of rock, pop and new wave with singles such as "Fire" (1978), "He's So Shy" (1980), and "Slow Hand" (1981).

The group found its biggest success with the release of the Break Out album in 1983 which featured hits such as "Automatic", "Jump (For My Love)", a re-released version of "I'm So Excited", "Neutron Dance", and "Baby Come And Get It". It's notable for featuring Ruth's lead vocals on "Automatic" and "Neutron Dance", which hit the top ten of the Billboard Hot 100 Chart and led to the group winning two Grammy Awards. In 1988, Pointer, along with Billy Vera provided vocals for the song "Enemies Like You and Me" from the soundtrack to Iron Eagle II. That same year, Pointer also provided the singing voice of the character Rita in the Disney film Oliver & Company, where she sang the song "Streets of Gold" as well as a reprise of the song "Why Should I Worry" with fellow cast member Billy Joel. The Pointer Sisters were joined by Ruth's daughter Issa in the 1990s. The group was given a star on the Hollywood Walk of Fame in 1994.

In October 2021, Pointer competed in season six of The Masked Singer as "Cupcake". Pointer revealed upon her unmasking that she was supposed to perform on the show as part of a duo with her sister Anita in a duplicated and recolored Cupcake costume. Anita was dealing with an illness, forcing Ruth to perform alone.

With the deaths of Bonnie and Anita Pointer in 2020 and 2022 respectively, Ruth Pointer is the last surviving founding member of The Pointer Sisters.

== Personal life ==
Pointer has been married five times and has five children. The eldest is daughter Faun (born 1965) then son Malik (born 1966). Malik is a singer. Her daughter Issa Pointer (born 1978), is from a marriage with former Temptations member Dennis Edwards. They married on December 21, 1980 in Las Vegas, and divorced in 1983. In 1984, Pointer married noted bassist Don Boyette, divorcing in 1988.

She has three grandchildren and one great-grandchild as of 2016.

Pointer married Michael Sayles in 1990 and, at the age of 47 in 1993, she gave birth to twins, a boy named Conor and a girl named Ali. Both Issa Pointer and Ruth's granddaughter Sadako Pointer (born 1984) have performed as members of the Pointer Sisters. Pointer resides in Hopedale, Massachusetts with her husband.
