= New Kind of Medicine =

1998 single by Ultra Naté

Single by Ultra Naté

from the album Situation: Critical
- Released: 1998
- Studio: D-Lab Studios; Rollover Studios
- Genre: House; dance-pop; nu-disco
- Length: 3:36
- Label: Airplane! Records; AM:PM; Feel the Rhythm; Orange Records; Strictly Rhythm; Vendetta Records
- Songwriters: Ed Baden-Powell; Kwame Kwaten; Sarah Webb; Ultra Naté
- Producer: D'Influence

Ultra Naté singles chronology
"Found a Cure" (1998)	"New Kind of Medicine" (1998)	"If You Could Read My Mind" (1998)

Music video
- "New Kind of Medicine" on YouTube

"New Kind of Medicine" is a song by American recording artist Ultra Naté, released in 1998, by various labels, as the third single from her third album, Situation: Critical (1998). The song was co-written by Naté with Ed Baden-Powell, Kwame Kwaten and Sarah Webb. The radio version was remixed by British production team D'Influence. It was a top-20 hit in Scotland and the UK, and a top-30 hit in Iceland. On the Eurochart Hot 100, it reached number 42 in August 1998.

== Critical reception ==
J.D. Considine from The Baltimore Sun described the song as "feisty" and "Chic-style". Larry Flick from Billboard magazine wrote, "This time, she's flexing her earthy alto voice on 'New Kind of Medicine', a sparkling disco bauble produced with an old-school hand by D-Influence. Talk about sticky hooks! Baby, you won't be able to shake the chorus from this winner after one spin." He concluded, "This woman has grown into a supreme singer."

== Track listing ==
- CD single, Benelux (1998)
1. "New Kind of Medicine" (Radio Edit) – 3:39
2. "New Kind of Medicine" (Extended Version) – 7:03
- CD single, UK (1998)
1. "New Kind of Medicine" (Radio Edit) – 3:40
2. "Free" (Mood II Swing Edit) – 6:54
3. "Found a Cure" – 6:09
- CD maxi, Scandinavia (1998)
1. "New Kind of Medicine" (Radio Edit) – 3:36
2. "New Kind of Medicine" (Extended) – 7:02
3. "New Kind of Medicine" (Morales Club Mix) – 9:50
4. "New Kind of Medicine" (Tenaglia's Future Garage Mix) – 6:43

== Charts ==
Chart (1998–99)	Peak position
Estonia (Eesti Top 20)	11
Europe (Eurochart Hot 100)	42
France (SNEP)	52
Iceland (Íslenski Listinn Topp 40)	24
Quebec (ADISQ)	44
Scotland (OCC)	16
UK Singles (OCC)	14
US Hot Dance Club Songs (Billboard)	28
