= Give Me Something =

Give Me Something may refer to:

- "Give Me Something" (Yoko Ono song), 1980
- "Give Me Something" (David Guetta song), 2002
- "Give Me Something" (Jarryd James song), 2015
- "Give Me Something", a song by Emeli Sandé from the 2016 album Long Live the Angels
- "Give Me Something", a promotional song by American pop rock band OneRepublic for Arknights: Endfield, 2025

== See also ==
- You Give Me Something (disambiguation)
