= Grime, Silk, & Thunder =

Grime, Silk, Thunder

Studio album by Ultra Naté
- Released: June 5, 2007
- Recorded: 2005–2007
- Genre: Electronica, New York house, tribal house, vocal house, soul, dance-pop
- Length: 72:00
- Label: Tommy Boy
- Producer: Ultra Naté, Jens Bergmark, Louie Balo, Craig C., Bill Coleman, StoneBridge, Double Deuce, East West Connection, Funky Junction & SplashFunk, GoodandEvil, Quentin Harris, Eric Kupper, Andres Levin, Low Frequency Occupation, Mood II Swing, The Muthafunkas, Morgan Page, DJ Pope, Chris Willis

Ultra Naté chronology
Stranger than Fiction (2001)	Grime, Silk, Thunder (2007)	Alchemy: G.S.T. Reloaded (2008)

Grime | Silk | Thunder is the fifth studio album by singer-songwriter, Ultra Naté. The record was released on June 5, 2007, via Tommy Boy Records.

== Overview ==
The album includes the dance hits "Love's the Only Drug", "Give It All You Got", featuring Chris Willis, and "Automatic", which was previously a hit for the Pointer Sisters in 1984.

"It's Over Now" is a reworking of the song which originally appeared on Naté's debut album Blue Notes in the Basement. "Freak On", which was previously released in 2004, is a collaboration between Naté and Swedish DJ StoneBridge. The track "Getaway" was inspired by and alludes to Teddy Pendergrass.

== Track listing ==
1. "Loosely Based On" (E. Khutorsky, Ultra Naté, V. Yegudkin) – 5:18
2. "Love's the Only Drug" (Eric Kupper, Naté, Brian Pope, Ollie Wright) – 5:53
3. "Freak On" (Gerry DeVeaux, Sten Hallström, Naté) – 4:34
4. "Give It All You Got" (Andy Evans, Glenn Evans, Naté, Chris Willis) – 3:53
5. "Scandal" (Neal Conway, Naté) – 5:34
6. "Automatic" (Mark Goldenberg, Brock Walsh) – 4:58
7. "Slow Grind" (D. Blume, C. Castagno, E. Khutorsky, Naté, V. Yegudkin) – 5:36
8. "Falling" (T. Davis, Gary Hudgins, G. Lewis, Naté, Morgan Page) – 5:11
9. "Getaway" (G. Deane, I. Maden, Naté, S. Spencer) – 4:52
10. "Feel Love" (Neil Cowley, R. Easter, S. Harper, Naté) – 5:02
11. "Lethal Shot" (John Ciafone, Naté) – 4:38
12. "Star (It's Showtime)" (Lati Kronlund, Naté, C. Padovano, F. Quagliarella) – 3:51
13. "This House" (Louie Guzman, Naté) – 5:42
14. "It's Over Now" (Thommy Davis, Teddy Douglas, Mark Harris, Naté, Jay Steinhour) – 8:27
