= Lem Springsteen =

American songwriter

Lem Springsteen is an American songwriter and dance and music producer. He is best known as part of the house production duo Mood II Swing.

In 1997, he co-wrote and co-produced Ultra Naté's hit song "Free", a dance-pop-influenced disco track released on the Strictly Rhythm label. The song peaked at number 1 on the US Hot Dance Club Songs and Hot Dance Music/Maxi-Singles Sales charts, and charted in several other countries. The song has appeared on several '90s music compilation albums and was featured on the soundtracks for Chasing Liberty and I Know What You Did Last Summer.

== Biography ==
Springsteen was signed to EMI Music Publishing in London for several years after co-writing and co-producing the hit recording "Free" by Ultra Nate in 1997. He entered the music business at 16, after then-manager Vaughan Mason, who had hit recordings, procured a single deal with the now-defunct Chrysalis Records UK, after Lem and his younger brother won a talent contest at New York City's Apollo Theatre. Vaughan taught Lem songwriting, analog synths, and analog recording, before the digital era. Lem's style incorporates the music he grew up on, from soul/R&B to pop to disco/dance. Lem even has some rock influences but does not claim to be a rock-and-roll musician or producer.

Springsteen formed the music production company Mood II Swing with John Ciafone in 1993 after the pair began to work with Little Louie Vega of Masters At Work. In addition to productions with Masters At Work and Nuyorican Soul, Mood II Swing was commissioned by major and independent labels worldwide to remix dance versions of songs from 1993 – 2003. Their notable remixes include BT's "Remember", King Britt's "The Reason", and Ultra Naté's Found A Cure, which they also wrote and produced originally.

Mood II Swing produced many remixes in the 1990s and early 2000s, remixing about 300 tracks and producing about 100 original songs. Their music was included in the Strictly Rhythm 25 Year Anniversary compilation, Strictly DJ T: 25 Years Of Strictly Rhythm, released in March 2015. Their original productions as Mood II Swing include "Closer" and "All Night Long". Their original track "Do It Your Way" and their original production "Closer" featuring Carol Sylvan were included on For The Love Of House Volume 2, released by Defected Records in 2013.

In 1993, under the name Urbanized, Lem & John entered the world of dance music, producing the song titled "Helpless" featuring vocalist Silvano, which Mercury Records picked up from the NY independent label, Maxi Records. The late manager Jazz Summers, who represented Lisa Stansfield at the time, signed it to the UK's Big Life Records and became interested in developing an Urbanized album that never materialized.

In 1995, Lem Springsteen produced The Wall of Sound, featuring Gerald Lethan's single Run to Me, and a live band album called Storybook, featuring Gerald Lethan. However, the label wasn't interested in pushing a live band neo-soul type album.

In 1995, Springsteen was listed in the production credits for a track on Janet Jackson's remix album Janet Remixed, on which he played keyboards for David Morales on his remix of "Throb". The album went platinum in the UK. He also played and sang background vocals for Satoshi Tomiie's remix of "Romantic Call" by Queen Latifah and Patra. He played experimental keys for KRS-One's production for Mad Lion, recorded at Bass Hit Recording Studios in New York City. He's done dance remixes for major and independent artists in America and Europe. Mood II Swing's most noteworthy vocal remix is "Don't Mess With My Man" by Lucy Pearl.

Mood II Swing dissolved in 2008 in order for Springsteen and Ciafone to pursue individual interests. In 2010, Springsteen set up an indie imprint called Urban Lounge Music and has released several solo tracks and remixes, including Joi Cardwell's "Feels Like Heaven", Vanessa Daou's "Trouble Comes", and Information Society's "Running 2K14".
