= Is It Love? Ultra Naté Best Remixes, Vol. 1 =

Remix album by Ultra Naté
- Released: November 17, 1998
- Genre: Electronica, garage house, tribal house, club/dance
- Label: Warner Bros., Import Records

Ultra Naté chronology
Is It Love? Ultra Naté Best Remixes, Vol. 1 (1998)	Best Remixes, Vol. 2 (1999)

Is It Love? Ultra Naté Best Remixes, Vol. 1 is a compilation consisting of remixes of the singles from Ultra Naté's first album, Blue Notes in the Basement. This compilation was released on November 17, 1998.

== Track listing ==
1. Is It Love? (Club Mix)
2. Scandal (Club Mix)
3. It's Over Now (Tony Humphries Mix)
4. Deeper Love (The Leftfield Vocal Mix)
5. Rejoicing (Deee-Liteful Stomp Mix)
6. It's Over Now (Dancin' Danny D Mix)
7. Rejoicing (Gospel Stomp Mix)
8. It's Over Now (Original Classic Mix)
