= Found a Cure (Ultra Naté song) =

1998 single by Ultra Naté

Single by Ultra Naté

from the album Situation: Critical
- Released: 6 April 1998
- Genre: House; dance-pop
- Length: 6:06 (album version); 3:32 (radio mix)
- Label: Strictly Rhythm
- Songwriters: Ultra Naté; Lem Springsteen; John Ciafone; Woody Pak
- Producers: Mood II Swing; Full Intention

Ultra Naté singles chronology
"Free" (1997)	"Found a Cure" (1998)	"New Kind of Medicine" (1998)

Music video
- "Found A Cure" on YouTube

"Found a Cure" is a song by American recording artist Ultra Naté, released in April 1998 by Strictly Rhythm as the second single from her third album, Situation: Critical (1998). The song is written by Naté and the radio mix was remixed by English house music duo Full Intention, reaching number six on the UK Singles Chart, number two on the UK Dance Singles Chart and number-one on the US Billboard Hot Dance Club Songs chart. Additionally, the song was a top-10 hit also in Finland, Hungary and Scotland. Its accompanying music video was directed by Charles Stone III.

== Background and release ==
Ultra Naté wrote the song's lyrics with Lem Springsteen, John Ciafone and Woody Pak. Music critics and editors noted that it was different from the singer's previous and very successful single, "Free". In an interview, Naté explained, "It was meant to be that way. The most important thing to do was to make sure we didn't do something that would be construed as a second attempt at "Free". "Found a Cure" has a personality of its own and one that gets more interesting the more you get to know it."

== Critical reception ==
J.D. Considine of The Baltimore Sun remarked how the guitar-hook "evokes" "Sunshine of Your Love" on "Found a Cure". Larry Flick from Billboard magazine wrote, "It's not easy to follow a single like 'Free', which is easily among the most revered dance singles of the last five years. Naté fearlessly faces the challenge with a jam that smartly doesn't aim to duplicate the tone of her now-classic hit. Instead, she and collaborators Mood II Swing and Danny Madden have cooked up a tune that has an infectious pop feel and a sturdy, club-credible house groove. The diva is in fine voice here and is matched by a muscular bassline and keyboard/guitar interplay that oozes with funk flavor. Not only an excellent way of introducing Naté's long-awaited new album, Situation Critical, 'Found a Cure' positions her for another lengthy reign atop many a DJ's playlist."

British magazine Music Week said, "It may not be as anthemic as last year's top five smash 'Free', but 'Found a Cure' is an effective slice of uplifting, pounding house with Ultra Nate's sultry vocals and its "Feels like l'm going crazy" refrain." Chris Finan from the Record Mirror Dance Update gave the song a full score of five out of five, noting "how refreshing it is to see an equally good follow up that isn't a clone of its predecessor." A reviewer from Sunday Mirror commented, "Miss Nate proves there's more than 'Free' in her locker with a pure floorfiller. A Gloria Gaynor for the Millennium."

== Music video ==
A music video was produced to promote the single, directed by American film director Charles Stone III.

== Track listing ==
1. "Found a Cure" (Full Intention Radio Mix) – 3:32
2. "Found a Cure" (Mood II Swing Radio Mix) – 4:07
3. "Found a Cure" (Full Intention Club Mix) – 7:25
4. "Found a Cure" (Mood II Swing Original Vocal Mix) – 8:27
5. "Found a Cure" (Morillo's Classic Adventure) – 6:01
6. "Found a Cure" (Morillo Swings with the Constipated Monkeys Edit) – 6:31
7. "Found a Cure" (Classic String Mix) – 3:51

== Charts ==
Chart (1998)	Peak position
Australia (ARIA)	127
Canada Dance/Urban (RPM)	15
Europe (Eurochart Hot 100)	21
Finland (Suomen virallinen lista)	7
France (SNEP)	73
Hungary (Mahasz)	9
Iceland (Íslenski Listinn Topp 40)	32
Italy (Musica e dischi)	11
Quebec (ADISQ)	37
Scotland (OCC)	7
Switzerland (Schweizer Hitparade)	35
UK Singles (OCC)	6
UK Dance (OCC)	2
US Hot Dance Club Songs (Billboard)	1

== See also ==
- List of number-one dance singles of 1998 (U.S.)
