= Free (Ultra Naté song) =

1997 single by Ultra Naté

Single by Ultra Naté

from the album Situation: Critical
- Released: March 31, 1997
- Genre: House; disco; soul
- Length: 5:52 (album version); 3:25 (Mood II Swing radio mix)
- Label: Strictly Rhythm
- Songwriters: Ultra Naté; Lem Springsteen; John Ciafone
- Producers: Lem Springsteen; John Ciafone

Ultra Naté singles chronology
"How Long" (1994)	"Free" (1997)	"Found a Cure" (1998)

Music video
- "Free" on YouTube

"Free" is a song by American recording artist Ultra Naté, released on March 31, 1997, through record label Strictly Rhythm. It was co-written by Naté, Lem Springsteen and John Ciafone, while production was held by both Springsteen and Ciafone. "Free" was served as the lead single from her third studio album, Situation: Critical (1997). Musically, the song is a house-influenced song that incorporates strong 1990s soul, dance-pop, garage and disco. The accompanying music video was directed by Fenton Bailey and Randy Barbato, depicting Naté in an abandoned hospital.

"Free" received positive reviews from contemporary music critics, who commended Naté's vocal ability and the production, and has received several accolades since its release; it has been noted as one of the best dance anthems during the 1990s decade. It became Naté's most successful single to date, charting in many countries around the world. "Free" reached number-one in Italy, and peaked inside the top ten in Canada, France, Iceland, Ireland, Switzerland and the United Kingdom. It also charted on the US Billboard Hot 100, peaking at number 75, but reached number-one on the Billboard Dance Club Play chart.

Ultra Naté performed the song in various TV-shows, like the British music chart television programme Top of the Pops, where she performed several times. "Free" won her two awards in the categories of Best House/Garage 12-inch and Best Pop 12-inch Dance Record at the 1998 International Dance Music Awards. In 2025, Billboard magazine ranked "Free" among "The 100 Best Dance Songs of All Time" and "The 50 Best House Songs of All Time".

== Background and release ==
"When Ultra and I got together to write lyrics, we had a blast. I wrote the chorus, she did the verses, and then we worked on the bridge together. The words came flowing out. We'd talked about formulas in dance music and what labels wanted. We wanted to be free from that – which is partly where the chorus came from. Plus, I remember talking to Ultra about my personal life and feeling trapped by other people's expectations. We were both in our 20s and feeling stuck in various ways."

— Lem Springsteen of Mood II Swing talking about the song.

Naté displayed her singing talent at an early age. She sang in church and studied medicine at the university in Baltimore. At weekends she went to clubs, where she met house music production team The Basement Boys. They started writing songs together, the first one was "It's Over Now", which became a top-70 hit in the UK in 1989. In 1991, Naté's debut album, Blue Notes in the Basement, was released. After she was dropped from the label, she signed Strictly Rhythm in New York. They wanted to release a new album with Naté, and she teamed up with producers and songwriters John Clafone and Lem Springsteen in Mood II Swing. Naté was inspired by "Losing My Religion" by R.E.M. and wanted a rock song that would work in clubs, adding the guitar line at the beginning of the song. The famous riff was played by Woody Pak, a friend of Springsteen.

Naté told DJ Mag in 2024, "The inspirations for approaching 'Free' were from R.E.M., 'Losing My Religion' and from a lot of Sheryl Crow, a lot of heavy guitar kind of stuff. [...] And we all went in 110% from the rock tip, like from the bottom to the top, from drums on up. It was all rock. We didn't decide until after 'Free' was done to then put the Mood II Swing signature groove in there. That's what made it work in both worlds." The title of the song came up randomly in the process of making a song that everyone could connect to. Naté co-wrote the lyrics and had written two different versions with two different verses, B-sections, etc. They then started cutting up the best bits of both versions and in the end, it all was put together as the final version of what would become known as "Free". Three gospel-singers; Audrey Wheeler, Cindy Mizelle and Khadejia Bass were hired to perform the chorus with Naté. Strictly Rhythm sent out test pressings on red vinyl, and American DJ, Little Louie Vega was the first DJ to play the promotional copy of "Free" in clubs. From there, the single went on becoming a global hit. The gay community saw it as a song about empowerment and made it a huge anthem.

== Critical reception ==
"Free" received positive reviews from most music critics. Barry Walters for The Advocate wrote, "One of house music's most independent-minded divas creates an anthem celebrating liberty in general and gay pride for those with ears to hear it." Trish Maunder from The Age named it a "joyous dance-floor anthem". AllMusic had highlighted three official versions of the song as "AllMusic Track Picks"; the Bob Sinclar Remix, Jason Nevins Mix and the original version of the song. J.D. Considine from The Baltimore Sun described it as a "guitar-driven dance tune", noting its "arpeggiated guitar and sly, melancholy melody". Larry Flick from Billboard magazine stated that it "shows [Naté] in excellent vocal form, belting with a level of authority that only comes with time and experience." He remarked that the singer "has a field day with the message of empowerment that fuels 'Free', not to mention producers Lem Springsteen and Jon Ciafone's invigorating soul-house groove."

Pamela Rivers from Columbia Daily Spectator named it the "high point" of the Situation: Critical album. Richard Wallace from the Daily Mirror praised it as a "divine" dance single. Dave Sholin from the Gavin Report commented, "Don't let this one slip by without a careful listen." Caroline Sullivan from The Guardian complimented it as a "piano-led" hit with "sunny house beat propelled by Ultra's paint-blistering voice." Derrick Mathis from LA Weekly described it as "infectious", "with Ultra ordering us — above some righteous backup vocals — to be free and "do whatcha want to do". James Hyman from Music Week's RM gave "Free" a full score of five out of five and named it House Tune of the Week, concluding, "One of this year's Miami club anthems will live up to the hype when released here through its simplicity and strong Mood II Swing production. Sweet, summery 'Woody Pak-ed' guitars wrap themselves around bouncy bass and uplifting You're free...to do what you want to do... vocals to produce clear catchyness."

A reviewer from the publication Resident Advisor awarded the song four stars out of five, saying, "This is a solid package from Curvve Recordings. 'Free' has already received widespread plays from jocks worldwide, this time around it appears that it may well do the same. An absolute crowd puller, and an essential release for any house DJ that is looking for something to fill up a dance floor in seconds." Irish Sunday Life named it an "anthemic" hit single, remarking that it "overwhelms" the other songs of the album.

== Chart performance ==
"Free" reached number one in Italy, as well as and on the US Billboard Dance Club Play chart. It peaked inside the top 10 in Canada, France, Iceland, Ireland, Switzerland, and the United Kingdom. In the UK, it reached number four during its second week on the UK Singles Chart, on June 15, 1997, and was the first dance song to top the UK Airplay Chart without first topping the sales chart. The song was a top-20 hit in Norway and Belgium, where it reached numbers 17 and 11, respectively. In addition, it peaked within the top 30 in the Netherlands, New Zealand, and Sweden, the top 40 in Australia and Austria, and the top 50 in Germany. On the Eurochart Hot 100, "Free" went to number eight in September 1997. On the Billboard Hot 100, it peaked at number 75. In West Asia, it became a top-10 hit in Israel, peaking at number ten on July 22, 1997. It spent 6 weeks inside the Israeli top 30. It was certified gold in France and double platinum in the United Kingdom, with respective sales of 250,000 and 1,200,000. In 2003, various remixes of "Free", published by Curvve Recordings and Peace Bisquit, reached number 23 on the Billboard Dance Club Play chart.

== Music video ==
A music video was produced to promote "Free", directed by American filmmakers Fenton Bailey and Randy Barbato. The video features Naté performing the song in an abandoned hospital, among hospital equipments. The idea came from Bailey and Barbato, and Naté would later call it "their madcap idea". She wears a white dress and has a feather boa in her hand. Some scenes also shows the singer wearing a strait-jacket. She explained in a 1998 interview, "That's a symbolic situation, a dream sequence, the strait-jacket represents certain limits people put on themselves. In the end, I wake up from that dream."

In 2024, Naté told DJ Mag, "It was their concept of it being more irony than your standard dance music video where everybody's in the club, hands in the air, you know, the DJ and the singer. And it was the sterile lack of freedom in the video, the song speaks to breaking free of that and fighting against that, and fighting against those norms. So all of those references are more metaphorical than anything. You know, some people loved it, some people hated it, but at least they talked about it." There are two different edits of the video, with some different scenes.

== Impact and legacy ==
"Free" was named Pete Tong's Essential New Tune and the Mixmag Update named it Single of the Week. In April 1998, it was awarded the prize for Best Dance Track at the 1998 Capital Radio Awards, as well as two awards in the categories of Best House/Garage 12-inch and Best Pop 12-inch Dance Record at the 1998 International Dance Music Awards. Same year, DJ Magazine ranked the song number five in their list of the "Top 100 Club Tunes". MTV Dance placed "Free" at number 31 in their list of "The 100 Biggest 90's Dance Anthems of All Time" in November 2011. In "The Top 10 Dance Tunes of the '90s" for Attitude in June 2016, the song was ranked at number one. It was voted the top track of 1997 by UK electronic dance music magazine Mixmag. The magazine later included the song on their list of the "30 Best Vocal House Anthems Ever" in 2018, writing, "The opening bars are delicate, but soon enough the bumping production kicks in, underpinning a vocal that burns with the potency of the sun's surface, encouraging dancers to live by Ultra Naté's words and be free."

In 2017, Billboard magazine ranked "Free" number 78 in their list of "The 100 Greatest Pop Songs of 1997", adding, "Ebullient enough of a disco jam to get 1997 confused for 1979 [...] and satisfying enough for its Mood II Swing-remixed 12" version to last for Donna Summer lengths without getting annoying." Dave Fawbert from ShortList stated that the song "remains, forever, an eternal banger" same year. In 2019, "Free" was also included in Mixmag's list of "The 20 Best Diva House Tracks". British singer-songwriter and actor Will Young chose "Free" as his all-time favorite sunshine track in 2019, saying, "MTV was so big then and this video came along and Ultra Nate had very short hair, dyed yellow and was so different-looking – she paved the way for a different kind of artist."

Tomorrowland voted the song number one in their official list of "The Ibiza 500" in 2021. The year before, it was voted number nine on the same list. In 2022, Time Out ranked it number 14 in their list of "The 50 Best Gay Songs to Celebrate Pride All Year Long", while Pitchfork featured it in their ranking of "The 30 Best House Tracks of the '90s". In March 2025, Billboard ranked "Free" number 90 in their "The 100 Best Dance Songs of All Time", writing, "Over 20 years later, when dance floors re-opened post-lockdown, 'Free' took on new meaning for a new generation of punters ready to reclaim the light. Truly timeless."

=== Accolades ===
Year	Publisher	Country	Accolade	Rank
1998	Capital Radio Awards	United Kingdom	"Best Dance Track"	1
1998	International Dance Music Awards	United States	"Best House/Garage 12-inch"	1
1998	International Dance Music Awards	United States	"Best Pop 12-inch Dance Record"	1
1998	DJ Magazine	United Kingdom	"Top 100 Club Tunes"	5
1998	Mixmag	United Kingdom	"Top Track of 1997"	1
2011	MTV Dance	United Kingdom	"The 100 Biggest 90's Dance Anthems of All Time"	31
2016	Attitude	United Kingdom	"The Top 10 Dance Tunes of the '90s"	1
2017	Billboard	United States	"The 100 Greatest Pop Songs of 1997"	78
2018	Mixmag	United Kingdom	"30 Best Vocal House Anthems Ever"	*
2019	Mixmag	United Kingdom	"The 20 Best Diva House Tracks"	*
2020	Tomorrowland	Belgium	"The Ibiza 500"	9
2021	Tomorrowland	Belgium	"The Ibiza 500"	1
2022	Time Out	United Kingdom	"The 50 Best Gay Songs to Celebrate Pride All Year Long"	14
2022	Pitchfork	United States	"The 30 Best House Tracks of the '90s"	*
2024	DJ Magazine	United Kingdom	"40 Essential Tracks from 40 Years of House Music"	*
2025	Billboard	United States	"The 100 Best Dance Songs of All Time"	90
2025	Billboard	United States	"The 50 Best House Songs of All Time"	17

(*) indicates the list is unordered.

== Track listings ==
- US maxi-CD single
1. "Free" (Mood II Swing radio mix) – 3:24
2. "Free" (Full Intention radio mix) – 3:30
3. "Free" (Mood II Swing live radio mix) – 3:28
4. "Free" (Mood II Swing extended vocal mix) – 12:00
5. "Free" (Mood II Swing live mix) – 7:30
6. "Free" (Full Intention vocal mix) – 6:46
7. "Free" (Mood II Swing house dub) – 7:30
8. "Free" (Full Intention Sugar Daddy dub) – 6:00
9. "Free" (R.I.P. Up North mix) – 7:00
- US 12-inch single

A1. "Free" (M&S Philly Klub mix) – 7:30
A2. "Free" (M&S Philly dub) – 7:30
A3. "Free" (Tiefschwarz a cappella) – 3:50
B1. "Free" (GA's mix) – 8:00
B2. "Free" (M&S Epic Reprise mix) – 7:56

- European CD single
1. "Free" (Mood II Swing radio mix) – 3:25
2. "Free" (Full Intention radio mix) – 3:15
- UK CD single
1. "Free" (radio edit)
2. "Free" (Mood II Swing extended vocal mix)
3. "Free" (Mood II Swing live vocal mix)
4. "Free" (Full Intention club mix)
5. "Free" (Mood II Swing house dub)
- UK 12-inch single

A1. "Free" (Mood II Swing extended vocal mix)
AA1. "Free" (Mood II Swing live vocal mix)
AA2. "Free" (Mood II Swing house dub)

- UK cassette single
1. "Free" (radio edit)
2. "Free" (Full Intention club mix)
- Australian CD and cassette single
1. "Free" (Mood II Swing radio mix)
2. "Free" (Mood II Swing live edit)
3. "Free" (Mood II Swing extended vocal mix)
4. "Free" (Mood II Swing live mix)
5. "Free" (Mood II Swing house dub)

== Remixes ==
- In 2004, Curvve Recordings released the official remixes of "Free", which peaked at number 23 on the US Billboard Dance Club Play chart. Remixers included Oscar G, Trendriod, Junior Sanchez, and Corbett & Troia.
- In 2016, Defected Records released a Deep House remix/mashup of "Free" made by Claptone, called "The First Time Free (Claptone Remix)". This track includes the guitar riff from "Free", overlaid with the vocals from "The First Time", by Roland Clark.
- In 2020, Dimitri Vegas & Like Mike released on Smash The House D'Angello & Francis' Future Rave Remix of Free (Live Your Life)

== Charts ==
=== Weekly charts ===
Chart (1997)	Peak position
Australia (ARIA)	31
Austria (Ö3 Austria Top 40)	33
Belgium (Ultratop 50 Flanders)	22
Belgium (Ultratop 50 Wallonia)	11
Canada (Nielsen SoundScan)	10
Canada Dance/Urban (RPM)	4
Europe (Eurochart Hot 100)	8
France (SNEP)	6
Germany (GfK)	42
Iceland (Íslenski Listinn Topp 40)	10
Ireland (IRMA)	9
Israel (Israeli Singles Chart)	10
Italy (Musica e dischi)	1
Italy Airplay (Music & Media)	8
Netherlands (Dutch Top 40)	29
Netherlands (Single Top 100)	28
New Zealand (Recorded Music NZ)	30
Norway (VG-lista)	17
Quebec (ADISQ)	13
Scottish Singles Sales (Official Charts)	5
Spain Maxi-Singles (AFYVE)	1
Sweden (Sverigetopplistan)	28
Switzerland (Schweizer Hitparade)	6
UK Singles (Official Charts)	4
UK Dance (Official Charts)	2
UK Club Chart (Music Week)	1
US Billboard Hot 100	75
US Dance Club Songs (Billboard)	1
US Dance Singles Sales (Billboard)	1

Chart (2004)	Peak position
US Dance Club Songs (Billboard) Remixes	23

=== Year-end charts ===
Chart (1997)	Position
Belgium (Ultratop 50 Wallonia)	56
Canada Dance/Urban (RPM)	44
Europe (Eurochart Hot 100)	35
France (SNEP)	36
Iceland (Íslenski Listinn Topp 40)	55
Switzerland (Schweizer Hitparade)	29
UK Singles (OCC)	20
UK Club Chart (Music Week)	6
US Dance Club Play (Billboard)	4
US Maxi-Singles Sales (Billboard)	9

== Certifications ==
Region	Certification	Certified units/sales
France (SNEP)	Gold	250,000^{*}
United Kingdom (BPI)	2× Platinum	1,200,000^{‡}
^{*} Sales figures based on certification alone.^{‡} Sales+streaming figures based on certification alone.
