= How Long: Ultra Naté Best Remixes, Vol. 2 =

1999 remix album

Remix album by Ultra Naté
- Released: March 30, 1999
- Genre: Electronica, garage house, tribal house, club/dance
- Length: mm:ss
- Label: Warner Bros., Import Records

Ultra Naté chronology
The Best Remixes, Vol. 1 (1998)	How Long: Ultra Naté Best Remixes, Vol. 2 (1999)	Alchemy - G.S.T. Reloaded (2008)

How Long: Ultra Naté Best Remixes, Vol. 2 is a compilation consisting of remixes of the singles from Ultra Naté's second album, One Woman's Insanity. This compilation was released on March 30, 1999.

== Track listings ==
- 1. "How Long" (Wingston Hip-Hop Edit)
- 2. "Show Me" (Original Extended Version)
- 3. "Joy" (What Rave? Mix)
- 4. "Incredibly You"
- 5. "Show Me" (Masters at Work 12" Dub)
- 6. "How Long" (Fire Island Remix)
- 7. "How Long" (Ultra's House Swing)
- 8. "Show Me" (Chameleon House Mix)
- 9. "Joy" (Never Ending Joy Mix)
- 10. "How Long" (118th Street Instrumental)
