= Situation: Critical =

Studio album by Ultra Naté
- Released: April 27, 1998
- Recorded: 1996–1997
- Genres: Electronica; garage house; dance-pop
- Length: 55:16
- Label: Strictly Rhythm
- Producers: Masters at Work; Mood II Swing; D-Influence

Ultra Naté chronology
One Woman's Insanity (1993)	Situation: Critical (1998)	Stranger than Fiction (2001)

Singles from Situation: Critical
- 1. "Free" Released: March 31, 1997; 2. "Found a Cure" Released: 1998; 3. "New Kind of Medicine" Released: 1998; 4. "Release the Pressure" Released: 1998

Professional ratings
Review scores
Source	Rating
AllMusic	4/5 stars
Music Week	favorable

Situation: Critical is Ultra Naté's third album, released on Strictly Rhythm in 1998. The album and especially its lead single, "Free", has become her most successful work of music in the mainstream pop world on both sides of the Atlantic so far. "Found a Cure" and "New Kind of Medicine" were also hit singles. As of July 1999, the album sold 150,000 units in the US, according to Nielsen SoundScan. She said in an interview about the album, "It has dance elements but it's much broader than just that. There are ballads, mid-tempo grooves. Overall I think it's very warm. I think it's a good listening album."

== Critical reception ==
British magazine Music Week wrote, "As well as tackling traditional disco topics such as the pain of love, self-written songs such as the title track and "Release the Pressure" focus on social comment, always from a personal, uplifting perspective. There are times when the slickness of the production stands in the way of the message, but Ultra Nate's personality always shines through."

== Track listing ==
No.	Title	Writer(s)	Length
1.	"Situation: Critical"	Ultra Naté, Al Mack	5:28
2.	"New Kind of Medicine"	Naté, Ed Baden-Powell, Kwame Kwaten, Sarah Webb, Steve Marston	5:02
3.	"Free"	Naté, Lem Springsteen, John Ciafone	5:52
4.	"Found a Cure"	Naté, Ciafone, Woody Pak, Springsteen	6:06
5.	"It's Crying Time"	Naté, Springsteen	3:51
6.	"Release the Pressure"	Naté, Mack	5:00
7.	"Any Ole Love"	Naté, Springsteen	4:01
8.	"Love You Can't Deny"	Naté, Baden-Powell, Kwaten, Webb, Marston	4:38
9.	"Every Now + Then"	Naté, Springsteen	3:57
10.	"Divine Love"	Naté, Carl K. Gonzales, Luis F. Vega	7:14
11.	"Found a Cure" (Full Intention Mix)		4:07

UK Deluxe Edition Bonus Tracks
No.	Title	Length
12.	"Free" (Full Intention Club Mix)	6:48
13.	"Free" (M&S Philly Klub Edit)	4:16

== Charts ==
Chart (1998)	Peak position
Australian Albums (ARIA)	157
UK Albums Chart	17
