= Freak On =

Single by StoneBridge vs. Ultra Naté

from the album Can't Get Enough and Grime, Silk, & Thunder
- Released: 16 May 2005
- Recorded: 2005
- Genre: Dance
- Length: 3:41
- Label: Hed Kandi Records
- Songwriters: Gerry DeVeaux, Sten Hallström, Ultra Naté

StoneBridge singles chronology
"Take Me Away" (2005)	"Freak On" (2005)	"SOS" (2007)

Ultra Naté singles chronology
"Time of Our Lives" (2004)	"Freak On" (2005)	"Love's the Only Drug" (2006)

"Freak On" is a song performed by the Swedish DJ StoneBridge (Sten Hallström) and the American recording artist Ultra Naté. Co-written by Gerry DeVeaux, Sten Hallström and Ultra Naté, the song was the fourth single released from StoneBridge's album Can't Get Enough and the first single from Ultra Naté's fifth studio album Grime, Silk, & Thunder.

== Track listing ==
- UK CD maxi-single
1. "Freak On" (album edit) – 3:41
2. "Freak On" (Ferry Corsten Vocal Mix) – 6:44
3. "Freak On" (StoneBridge Club Mix) – 8:08
4. "Freak On" (Live Element Remix) – 7:02
5. "Freak On" (JJ Stockholm Club Mix) – 8:37

== Charts ==
Chart performance for "Freak On"
Chart (2005)	Peak position
Australia (ARIA)	60
Irish Singles Chart	43
UK Singles Chart	37
