= Therese Grankvist =

Swedish singer and songwriter

- Also known as: Therese; Drömhus
- Born: 2 May 1977 (age 48)
- Origin: Nässjö, Sweden
- Genres: Electronic; house; dance-pop
- Occupations: Singer; songwriter
- Years active: 1997–present
- Labels: Dr. Records; Tretiak; Vixon Records
- Website: theresegrankvist.com

Therese Grankvist (born 2 May 1977) is a Swedish singer and songwriter. She started recording in 1997 under the Drömhus alias, and goes by Therese since the release of her single "Monkey" in 2002. She may be best known for her internationally successful collaborations with Swedish DJ and producer StoneBridge, "Put 'Em High" and "Take Me Away", released on Hed Kandi in 2004.

Therese started her own label Vixon Records in 2014.

== Early life ==
Therese Grankvist spent her childhood in Nässjö, Sweden. She later moved to Tullinge (near Stockholm) at the age of 13.

== Career ==
=== 1997–2000: Drömhus and Melodifestivalen ===
Therese's career started when she called a record company and recorded her singing on their answering machine. When she later met Dr. Alban, he convinced her to join the new eurodance project Drömhus. At first, Drömhus was meant to consist of two men and Therese, but eventually shrank to just Therese and the producers.

In 1997, Drömhus's first single "Du och jag" ("You and I") was released. The big breakthrough, however, came in 1998 with the single "Vill ha dig" ("Want You"), a cover of a hit by the band Freestyle in the 1980s.

In 1999, Drömhus competed in the Melodifestivalen, the Swedish national selection for Eurovision Song Contest, with the song "Stjärna på himmelen" ("Star in the Sky"). It finished second, thus not qualifying for the Eurovision Song Contest. In 2000, Therese announced that she would leave Drömhus to perform under the mononym Therese instead.

=== 2001–2004: Acapulco and work with StoneBridge ===
Therese's first singles, "Monkey" and "I Need Somebody", were released in 2002, in advance of her debut album Acapulco, released early 2003 on Swedish record label Tretiak. It was her first album released under the alias Therese, containing elements of electronica, house and breakbeat, and was produced by Klas B Wahl and Swedish DJ and producer StoneBridge. Late 2003, Therese released the track "Time". It was released on Robbins Entertainment in the US in 2004.

In 2004, Therese collaborated with StoneBridge on two house tracks, "Put 'Em High" and "Take Me Away", both released on record label Hed Kandi in the UK. Especially "Put 'Em High" was a remarkable success, with the track also featured on Hed Kandi's greatest hits collection Hed Kandi: Ibiza 10 Years in 2012.

=== 2005–2009: Multiple non-album releases ===
In 2005, Therese co-wrote and provided backing vocals for Dannii Minogue's "Perfection" which was produced by the Soul Seekerz.

Grankvist, together with The Attic, competed with the song "The Arrival" at Melodifestivalen 2007 on 17 February 2007 for the opportunity to represent Sweden in the Eurovision Song Contest 2007 in Helsinki, Finland. They ended 7th place in Heat 3, not qualifying for the final of Melodifestivalen.

Therese released a new single, "Feelin' Me", in the UK on Positiva Records in May 2007. The track was produced by Digital Dog and came with remixes by Thomas Gold and Armand Van Helden, amongst others. The B-side was produced by Thomas Gold, titled "How Do You Wanna?".

On 2 June 2007, Therese, featuring The Attic, performed their single "The Arrival" on Sommarkrysset, a Swedish TV show that airs in summer. She again appeared on Sommarkrysset in August 2007, together with Danny Saucedo performing the song "If Only You" from Danny's album.

Furthermore, Grankvist provided vocals for "Another Love" by The Mac Project in 2008 and "Neon Lights" by Elek-Tro Junkies in 2009. She also released the track "Shed My Skin" on Lifted House/disco:wax in Denmark in 2009.

=== 2010–present: Missing Disco and Vixon Records ===
On 28 May 2010, Therese released a new single in Sweden, titled "Drop It Like It's Hot", featuring elements of electro, tribal house and dance-pop. A B-side, "Say It (In the Morning)", and remixes by the Wideboys and Alesso were released as well, with the latter eventually featured on the second album, Missing Disco. In 2011, at the pre-listening party of Lady Gaga's Born This Way album in Stockholm, Therese performed a mashup of "Drop It Like It's Hot" and Lady Gaga's "Born This Way".

In 2011, "Remedy" was released as the second single from Missing Disco. It was re-released in the UK in 2014 with new remixes by Seamus Haji, DANK and Papercha$er, amongst others. This marked the first release on Therese's own label Vixon Records, founded in 2014.

Early 2015, the title track off the album, "Missing Disco", was released as the third single, featuring an extended version as well as remixes by Rich B & Phil Marriott, Chris Henry, Phonetix and Gordon John. The track and remixes premiered on Therese's SoundCloud page.

Originally set for a late 2011 release, Missing Disco was released on 10 May 2015.

== Charitable work ==
Therese undertakes charity work for two charities.

== Discography ==
Studio albums

- Acapulco (2003)
