= Love Don't Let Me Go =

Single by David Guetta featuring Chris Willis

from the album Just a Little More Love
- Released: 28 February 2002
- Genre: Electro house
- Length: 3:36
- Label: Virgin; Gum Prod
- Songwriters: David Guetta; Ned Scott; Benji Vaughan; Chris Willis; Jean-Charles Carré; Joachim Garraud; Maff Scott; Matt White
- Producers: David Guetta; Joachim Garraud

David Guetta singles chronology
| "Just a Little More Love" (2001) | "Love Don't Let Me Go" (2002) | "People Come People Go" (2002) |

Chris Willis singles chronology
| "Just a Little More Love" (2001) | "Love Don't Let Me Go" (2002) | "People Come People Go" (2002) |

"Love Don't Let Me Go" is a song by French DJ and producer David Guetta, featuring vocals from American singer and long-time collaborator Chris Willis. The track was released as the second single from his debut studio album, Just a Little More Love, although served as the album's lead single in the United Kingdom. The main remix of the song, "Love Don't Let Me Go (Walking Away)", was also released as single in 2006.

== Music video ==
A music video for the track was released in January 2002, at a total length of two minutes and fifty-five seconds. The video features a hologram of Guetta in space, but once again, does not feature Chris Willis.

== Track listing ==
- French CD single (2002)
1. "Love Don't Let Me Go" (main mix) – 7:25
2. "Love Don't Let Me Go" (house remix) – 5:28
3. "Love Don't Let Me Go" (1987 Rister Remix) – 6:46
4. "Love Don't Let Me Go" (Scream Mix) – 8:01
5. "Love Don't Let Me Go" (single edit) – 3:39
- UK CD single (2002)
1. "Love Don't Let Me Go" (single edit) – 3:39
2. "Love Don't Let Me Go" (house remix) – 5:28
3. "Love Don't Let Me Go" (Belamour Remix) – 5:51
4. "Love Don't Let Me Go" (music video)
- German CD single (2002)
1. "Love Don't Let Me Go" (single edit) – 3:39
2. "Love Don't Let Me Go" (house remix edit) – 3:52

== Charts and certifications ==
=== Weekly charts ===
| Chart (2002) | Peak position |
|---|---|
| Belgium (Ultratop 50 Flanders) | 10 |
| Belgium (Ultratop 50 Wallonia) | 7 |
| France (SNEP) | 4 |
| Greece (IFPI) | 4 |
| Netherlands (Dutch Top 40) | 19 |
| Netherlands (Single Top 100) | 37 |
| Hungary (Rádiós Top 40) | 2 |
| Hungary (Single Top 40) | 4 |
| Romania (Romanian Top 100) | 12 |
| Spain (Promusicae) | 10 |
| Switzerland (Schweizer Hitparade) | 13 |
| United Kingdom (The Official Charts Company) | 46 |

=== Year-end charts ===
| Chart (2002) | Position |
|---|---|
| Belgium (Ultratop Flanders) | 52 |
| Belgium (Ultratop Wallonia) | 34 |
| Europe (Eurochart Hot 100) | 59 |
| France (SNEP) | 17 |
| Switzerland (Schweizer Hitparade) | 40 |

=== Certifications ===
| Region | Certification | Certified units/sales |
|---|---|---|
| France (SNEP) | Gold | 250,000^{*} |
^{*} Sales figures based on certification alone.
