= Chris Willis =

American singer-songwriter (born 1969)

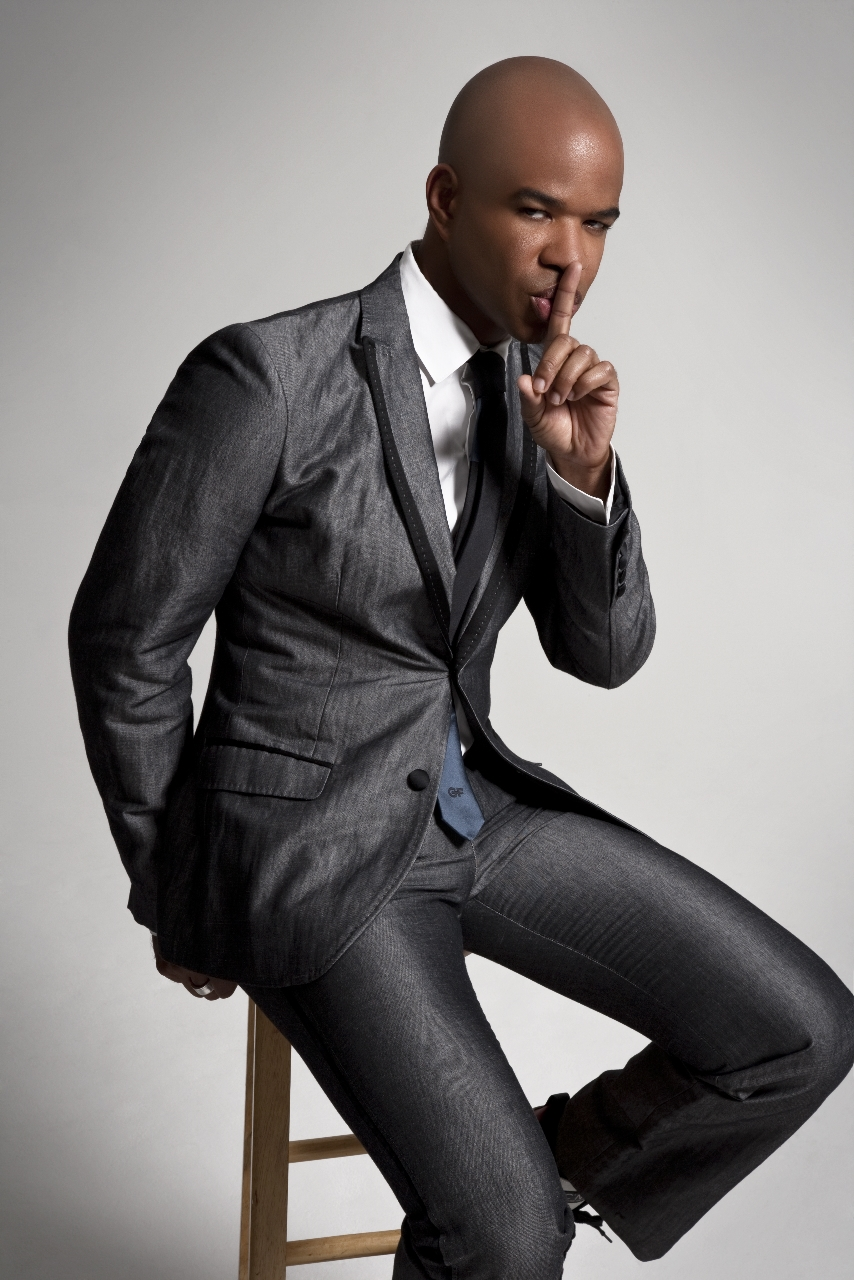
- Willis in 2008

Background information
- Born: Christopher Kevin Willis; February 26, 1969 (age 57); Dayton, Ohio, U.S.
- Genres: House; EDM; gospel; R&B; pop; Eurodance
- Occupations: Singer; songwriter; record producer
- Instruments: Vocals; piano
- Years active: 1986–present

Christopher Kevin Willis (born February 26, 1969) is an American singer, songwriter, and record producer. Although initially a gospel singer, he later received international attention for his collaborations with French house music disc jockey David Guetta. Willis guest performed on his singles "Just a Little More Love", "Love Don't Let Me Go", "Love Is Gone", "Tomorrow Can Wait", "Everytime We Touch" (with Steve Angello and Sebastian Ingrosso), "Would I Lie to You" (with Cedric Gervais) and "Gettin' Over You".

== Biography ==
Originally a gospel singer, with the Heritage Singers and others, he was featured on the pop-classical album Handel's Messiah – A Soulful Celebration in 1993, singing a contemporary version of "Every Valley Shall Be Exalted". His first job after college in Alabama was touring with a group that sang hundreds of shows in churches over a two-year period. In the mid-1990s, he toured as backup vocalist for Twila Paris. In 1996, he released his debut self-titled album, for which he wrote or co-wrote eight of the eleven songs, and earned a nomination for Best R&B Album at the 1996 Nashville Music Awards. That year, he opened on tour for Mark Lowry, and was one of several featured singers in the musical showcase Emmanuel, a national tour put together by Nashville producer Norman Miller. The tour spawned an album, which won a GMA Dove Award in 1998 for Special Event Album of the Year. He did mostly gospel until 1998 when he signed with a small music label. The label was bought out by a large corporation and Willis took that as a cue to move on. During this time he also worked to resolve the "angst" from being closeted about his sexuality, "I always felt like God really understood—but that wasn't the message I was receiving in the church. So, when I moved out on my own I really internalized that message that God makes us who we are and that it's up to us to embrace that or not. I chose to embrace all those things as freedom, and that freedom begat the freedom I experience now." He cites his internalized struggle as important to his transitioning out of gospel music. "I think there's this unspoken denial that you go through in gospel—maybe so in other musical art forms too—but I just felt for me it just wasn't easy to keep perpetuating that." On June 2, 2014, Willis married Jacqueline Leiske.

In 2000, he was working with the French boy band 2Be3 and when doing some publicity for their album in Paris one of the bandmates introduced him to house musician and producer David Guetta. Guetta invited Willis to the studio and the next day they wrote "Just a Little More Love". Willis co-wrote and provided most of the vocals on Guetta's debut album Just a Little More Love, including the hit title track.

His music genres have included gospel music, disco, pop rock, and R&B. Willis has previously used social networks including MySpace, Facebook and Twitter to share live photos, videos from his tours and answer questions from fans. Throughout 2009 he toured with David Guetta through Europe in support of One Love. He has also performed solo European dates. In November 2009 he performed at Danceclub C4 in Steyer, Austria for their 2nd Anniversary Party. A documentary about him, Inside Out, directed by Robert Jason and Eric Miclette for Complete World Domination was released in early 2010 alongside the "Gettin' Over" single.

His solo single "Louder (Put Your Hands Up)" was released on October 12, 2010. Willis co-wrote the song with Cutfather and Jonas Jeberg. The video premiered on DailyMotion October 26, 2010. Shot in Los Angeles, the video was directed by Billie Woodruff. The video has over two million views on his YouTube page. The song reached number one on Billboard's Hot Dance Club Songs chart on the issue dated January 8, 2011.

His second single "Too Much in Love" was released digitally August 16, 2011. The song features a guitar sample of Lenny Kravitz's "Are You Gonna Go My Way". A video was shot in Los Angeles and released on January 10, 2012. Many remixes were created and released on iTunes.

An eight-song EP titled Premium – Songs from the Love Ship, Vol. 1 was released on November 29, 2011 and features several of his solo singles.

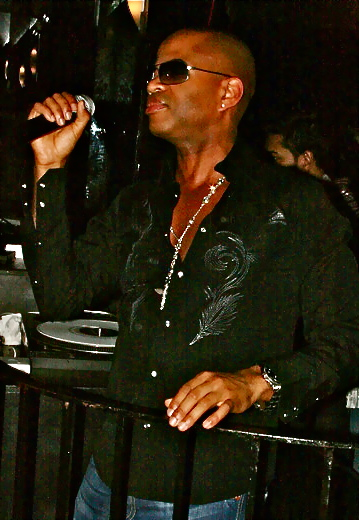
Willis performing in 2009.

== Discography ==
=== Studio albums ===
List of studio albums
Title	Album details
Chris Willis	Released: January 1, 1996; Label: Star Song; Formats: CD, digital download
Premium: Songs From The Love Ship Vol. 1	Released: November 29, 2011; Label: Veneer Records; Formats: CD, digital download

=== Singles ===
==== As lead artist ====
List of singles as lead artist, with selected chart positions and certifications, showing year released and album name
Title	Year	Peak position										Certifications	Album
Title	Year	US	US Dance	AUS	BEL	FRA	ITA	NLD	SWE	SWI	UK	Certifications	Album
"Out of My Hands"	1996	—	—	—	—	—	—	—	—	—	—		Chris Willis
"He's Mine"	2004	—	—	—	—	—	—	—	—	—	—		Non-album singles
"My Freedom"	2006	—	25	—	—	—	—	—	—	—	—		Non-album singles
"Tomorrow Can Wait" (with David Guetta vs. Tocadisco)	2008	—	—	—	19	7	—	21	—	43	84		Pop Life
"Everytime We Touch" (with David Guetta, Steve Angello and Sebastian Ingrosso)	2009	—	—	—	43	—	—	46	—	97	68		Pop Life
"Gettin' Over You" (with David Guetta featuring Fergie and LMFAO)	2010	31	1	5	12	1	3	31	28	11	1	ARIA: 2× Platinum; BPI: Platinum; BVMI: Gold; FIMI: Platinum	One More Love
"Louder (Put Your Hands Up)"	2010	—	1	—	27	—	—	—	—	—	—		Premium - Songs from the Love Ship, Vol. 1
"Too Much in Love"	2011	—	4	—	—	—	—	—	—	—	—		Premium - Songs from the Love Ship, Vol. 1
"People (Feel the Love)" (with OtherView)	2013	—	—	—	—	—	—	—	—	—	—		Non-album singles
"Survivor" (with Ben DJ)	2014	—	—	—	—	—	—	—	—	—	—		Non-album singles
"One Life"	2014	—	—	—	—	—	—	—	—	—	—		Non-album singles
"Lonely One" (with Crazibiza)	2015	—	—	—	—	—	—	—	—	—	—		Non-album singles
"No One Can Replace You" (with Purple Aura featuring Akon)	2015	—	—	—	—	—	—	—	—	—	—		Non-album singles
"Don't Cry (Remember My Name)" (with Joachim Garraud)	2015	—	—	—	—	—	—	—	—	—	—		Non-album singles
"Blood in my veins" (The Vinyljackers (MikeNova))	2016	—	—	—	—	—	—	—	—	—	—		Non-album singles
"Would I Lie to You" (with David Guetta and Cedric Gervais)	2016	—	—	—	30	20	71	—	80	35	—	BVMI: Gold	Non-album singles
"Warriors of the Night" (with Colin Crooks and Rob Styles)	2020	—	—	—	—	—	—	—	—	—	—		Non-album singles
"Warriors of the Night" (with The Vinyljackers and MikeNova)	2020	—	—	—	—	—	—	—	—	—	—		Non-album singles
"Not Afraid" (with Marc Benjamin)	2021	—	—	—	—	—	—	—	—	—	—		Non-album singles
"Work It Harder" (with Zight and Maximals)	2022	—	—	—	—	—	—	—	—	—	—		Non-album singles
"—" denotes a recording that did not chart or was not released in that territory.

==== As featured artist ====
List of singles as featured artist, with selected chart positions and certifications, showing year released and album name
Title	Year	Peak position										Certifications	Album
Title	Year	US	US Dance	AUS	BEL	FRA	ITA	NLD	SWE	SWI	UK	Certifications	Album
"Supersonic" (Billyweb featuring Chris Willis)	2001	—	—	—	—	—	—	—	—	—	—		Non-album single
"Just a Little More Love" (David Guetta featuring Chris Willis)	2001	—	—	—	29	29	—	80	—	59	19		Just a Little More Love
"Love Don't Let Me Go" (David Guetta featuring Chris Willis)	2002	—	—	—	7	4	—	37	—	13	46	SNEP: Gold; BEA: Gold	Just a Little More Love
"People Come People Go" (David Guetta featuring Chris Willis)	2002	—	—	—	47	42	—	—	—	54	—		Just a Little More Love
"Money" (David Guetta featuring Chris Willis and Moné)	2004	—	—	—	52	63	—	—	—	52	—		Guetta Blaster
"Stay" (David Guetta featuring Chris Willis)	2004	—	—	—	19	18	—	—	—	82	78		Guetta Blaster
"Love Is Gone" (David Guetta featuring Chris Willis)	2007	98	—	—	9	3	28	10	9	11	9	SNEP: Silver; IFPI SWI: Gold	Pop Life
"Give It All You Got" (Ultra Naté featuring Chris Willis)	2007	—	1	—	—	—	—	—	—	—	—		Grime, Silk, & Thunder
"My DJ Rock Superstar" (Nicola Fasano featuring Chris Willis)	2012	—	—	—	—	—	—	—	—	—	—		Non-album singles
"Party 2 Daylight" (Global Deejays featuring Chris Willis)	2013	—	—	—	—	—	—	—	—	—	—		Non-album singles
"Magnet" (Hook N Sling featuring Chris Willis)	2013	—	—	—	—	—	—	—	—	—	—		Non-album singles
"This Is Your Life" (Psyko Punkz and MC Lyte featuring Chris Willis)	2014	—	—	—	—	—	—	—	—	—	—		Non-album singles
"Colors" (Celestal featuring Chris Willis)	2017	—	—	—	—	—	—	—	—	—	—		Non-album singles
"Turn Your Love Around" (Cedric Gervais featuring Chris Willis)	2019	—	—	—	—	—	—	—	—	—	—		Non-album singles
"—" denotes a recording that did not chart or was not released in that territory.

==== Guest appearances ====
List of non-single guest appearances, with other performing artists, showing year released and album name
Title	Year	Other artist(s)	Album
"Gettin' Over"	2009	David Guetta	One Love
"Still Don't Have You"	2013	Duane Harden, Bimbo Jones	NB4U (Naked Before You)
