= Automatic (Pointer Sisters song) =

1984 song by the Pointer Sisters

Single by The Pointer Sisters

from the album Break Out
- B-side: "Nightline"
- Released: January 13, 1984
- Recorded: 1983 (Los Angeles, California)
- Genre: Funk; new wave; synth-pop; electronic rock
- Length: 4:48
- Label: Planet; RCA
- Songwriters: Brock Walsh; Mark Goldenberg
- Producer: Richard Perry

The Pointer Sisters singles chronology
"I Need You" (1983)	"Automatic" (1984)	"Jump (For My Love)" (1984)

Music video
- "Automatic" at TopPop on YouTube

"Automatic" is a song recorded by American vocal group the Pointer Sisters for their tenth studio album Break Out (1983). The song was released by the Planet label on January 13, 1984, as the second single from the album. It was written by Brock Walsh and Mark Goldenberg.

"Automatic" reached number five on the US Billboard Hot 100 and became one of their signature songs. Eventually, three other singles from Break Out reached the top-ten on the Hot 100 consecutively. Billboard named the song number 94 on their list of "100 Greatest Girl Group Songs Of All Time".

"Automatic" was the group's first Top 40 hit to feature Ruth Pointer's distinctive contralto on lead.

== Background ==
According to Ruth Pointer, "Automatic" was the final song chosen for Break Out: "We were taking a break from recording in the office of Jim Tract, who was Richard Perry's right-hand man, and Jim mentioned that he had a stash of tapes we might want to listen to [while on] a breather...We all sat up straight when we first heard ['Automatic'] and told Richard we wanted to include it on the album. 'Okay,' he said 'But who would sing the low part?' 'Are you kidding me?' I said, 'I'll do the low part!'"

Although Break Out largely comprised dance tracks, its lead single was the ballad "I Need You", chosen by producer Richard Perry in hopes of reinforcing the Pointer Sisters presence at R&B radio: the dance track "Jump (for My Love)" was intended as the second single but the heavy airplay afforded "Automatic" as an album cut by both dance clubs and radio stations caused the substitution of "Automatic" for "Jump..." as the second single release from Break Out, although "Jump..." would become the most successful US single off Break Out when it became the album's third single. The first Top 40 hit to feature Ruth Pointer's distinctive contralto on lead, "Automatic" reached #5 on the Hot 100 in Billboard in April 1984, also charting on the magazine's Hot R&B/Hip-Hop Songs and Hot Dance Club Play rankings, its #2 R&B chart peak making "Automatic" the highest charting R&B hit by the Pointer Sisters as a trio (in their original four-woman format the Pointer Sisters did score an R&B #1 hit with "How Long (Betcha' Got a Chick on the Side)"). Holding "Automatic" out of the top position of the R&B chart (for three weeks) was "Somebody's Watching Me" by Rockwell.

In the United Kingdom, "Automatic" would afford the Pointer Sisters their all-time biggest hit, spending two weeks at #2 on the UK chart in May 1984 while stuck behind The Reflex by Duran Duran when it also reached #1 in Ireland. "Automatic" also afforded the Pointer Sisters Top-Ten success in Belgium (#5 on the Flemish chart), the Netherlands (#9), and New Zealand (#8). In Australia, "Automatic" reached a chart peak of #15. The B-side of "Automatic" was "Nightline" featuring June Pointer on lead. "Nightline" was also originally featured on Break Out but was dropped from later pressings of the album to allow for the inclusion of the remix of "I'm So Excited".

== Personnel ==
The Pointer Sisters

- Ruth Pointer – lead vocals
- Anita Pointer – backing vocals
- June Pointer – backing vocals

Musicians

- Stephen Mitchell – synthesizers
- Howie Rice – synthesizers
- John Van Tongeren – synthesizers, Minimoog
- Brock Walsh – synthesizers, drum machine programming
- Paul Fox – E-mu Emulator
- Dennis Herring – guitars
- Mark Goldenberg – guitar (bridge)
- Eddie Watkins Jr. – bass

== Charts ==
=== Weekly charts ===
Chart (1984)	Peak position
Australia (Kent Music Report)	15
Belgium (Ultratop 50 Flanders)	5
Belgium (VRT Top 30 Flanders)	6
Canada Top Singles (RPM)	17
Ireland (IRMA)	1
Netherlands (Single Top 100)	9
Netherlands (Dutch Top 40)	6
New Zealand (Recorded Music NZ)	8
UK Singles (Official Charts)	2
US Billboard Hot 100	5
US Adult Contemporary (Billboard)	36
US Dance Club Songs (Billboard) as LP Cuts: I Need You/Automatic/Jump (For My Love)	2
US Hot Black Singles (Billboard)	2
US Cash Box Top 100	8

=== Year-end charts ===
Chart (1984)	Position
Australia (Kent Music Report)	72
Belgium (Ultratop 50 Flanders)	67
Netherlands (Single Top 100)	74
Netherlands (Dutch Top 40)	50
New Zealand (Recorded Music NZ)	34
UK Singles (Official Charts Company)	38
US Billboard Hot 100	48
US Dance Club Songs (Billboard) as LP Cuts: I Need You/Automatic/Jump (For My Love)	1
US Hot Black Singles (Billboard)	28
US Cash Box	50

== Ultra Naté cover ==
"Automatic"

Single by Ultra Naté

from the album Grime, Silk, & Thunder
- Released: 2007
- Length: 4:58
- Label: Tommy Boy Entertainment
- Songwriters: Brock Walsh, Mark Goldenberg

Ultra Naté singles chronology
"Love's the Only Drug" (2006)	"Automatic" (2007)	"Give It All You Got" (2007)

Music video
- "Automatic" on YouTube

Ultra Naté covered "Automatic" and released it as the third single from her album Grime, Silk, & Thunder. Her version topped the US dance chart, hitting number one in the issue dated April 28, 2007. This version appeared briefly in a nightclub scene of Looking: The Movie in 2016.

=== Music video ===
The music video for "Automatic" was directed by Karl Giant. Eric Henderson from Slant Magazine commented of the music video's beginning: "For the first two or three minutes, it's nothing if not a stalwart representation of your standard gay-bar video-jukebox fixture." Ultra Naté is later shown wearing a rhinestone-studded liquid Lycra while two men, apparently nude, watch her on their computers. Then Naté appears in a blow-up doll costume, which Henderson believed "sends the entire video into legitimately weird territory, as though David Meyers were asked to direct a video for Nine Inch Nails."

=== Track listing ===
- Belgian CD maxi-single
1. "Automatic" (Original Radio Mix) – 3:13
2. "Automatic" (Morgan Page vs. Peace Bisquit Radio Mix) – 3:03
3. "Automatic" (Original Extended) – 6:12
4. "Automatic" (Daz & Diddy Mix) – 7:17
- US CD maxi-single
1. "Automatic" (Original Extended) – 6:16
2. "Automatic" (Digital Dog Mix) – 6:31
3. "Automatic" (Paul Jackson Version Excursion Mix) – 6:19
4. "Automatic" (Spen & Thommy Sugar Vocal Mix) – 8:42
5. "Automatic" (Daz & Diddy Mix) – 7:18
6. "Automatic" (Funky Junction & NK Club Mix) – 6:29
7. "Automatic" (Funky Junction & Splashfunk Mix) – 6:53
8. "Automatic" (Monkey Brothers Ultra Bad Remix) – 8:40
9. "Automatic" (Dave Pezza Electro Dub Mix) – 9:30
10. "Automatic" (Shawn Q's Soltribe Vocal Mix) – 8:47
11. "Automatic" (Morgan Page vs. Peace Bisquit Radio Mix) – 3:04

=== Charts ===
Chart (2007–2009)	Peak Position
Belgium (Ultratip Flanders)	5
Hungary (Rádiós Top 40)	26
Netherlands (Single Top 100)	86
Spain (PROMUSICAE)	5
US Hot Dance Airplay (Billboard)	18
US Hot Dance Club Songs (Billboard)	1

== Other version ==
In 2006, Belgian singer Afi covered "Automatic". Her version became a minor hit in Belgium, where it reached top twenty on the Flanders Ultratip chart.

In 2022 the song got covered by American group Lake Street Dive.
