= Take Me Away (StoneBridge song) =

2005 single by StoneBridge

Single by StoneBridge featuring Therese

from the album Can't Get Enough
- Released: 17 January 2005
- Length: 3:06
- Label: Playground Music Scandinavia; Hed Kandi
- Songwriters: StoneBridge; Therese Grankvist
- Producer: StoneBridge

StoneBridge singles chronology
"Put 'Em High" (2004)	"Take Me Away" (2005)	"Freak On" (2005)

"Take Me Away" is a song by Swedish record producer StoneBridge featuring Swedish singer Therese, released as a single on 17 January 2005. "Take Me Away" peaked at number eight in Finland, number nine in the United Kingdom, number 21 in Ireland, and also charted in Australia, the Netherlands, and Sweden. In the United States, it peaked at number 12 on the Billboard Hot Dance Airplay chart.

== Track listings ==
Swedish CD single

1. "Take Me Away" (StoneBridge radio edit) – 3:05
2. "Take Me Away" (album version) – 5:21

Swedish maxi-CD single

1. "Take Me Away" (StoneBridge radio edit) – 3:04
2. "Take Me Away" (StoneBridge 12-inch mix) – 7:21
3. "Take Me Away" (MaUVe vocal mix) – 8:35
4. "Take Me Away" (D-Bop mix) – 7:27
5. "Take Me Away" (DJ Bomba & J Paolo Back to the 80s New Styling remix) – 7:41
6. "Take Me Away" (Rhythm Doctors vocal mix) – 8:26
7. "Take Me Away" (Stone's re-rub) – 8:19

UK and Australian CD single

1. "Take Me Away" (StoneBridge radio edit) – 3:04
2. "Take Me Away" (StoneBridge 12-inch mix) – 7:21
3. "Take Me Away" (MaUVe vocal mix) – 8:35
4. "Take Me Away" (D-Bop mix) – 7:27
5. "Take Me Away" (DJ Bomba & J Paolo Back to the 80s New Styling remix) – 7:41
6. "Take Me Away" (video) – 3:20

UK 12-inch single 1

A1. "Take Me Away" (StoneBridge 12-inch mix)
B1. "Take Me Away" (MaUVe dub)
B2. "Take Me Away" (Rhythm Doctors vocal mix)

UK 12-inch single 2

A. "Take Me Away" (MaUVe vocal mix)
B. "Take Me Away" (D-Bop remix)

== Charts ==
Chart (2005)	Peak position
Australia (ARIA)	47
Finland (Suomen virallinen lista)	8
Ireland (IRMA)	21
Ireland Dance (IRMA)	4
Netherlands (Single Top 100)	54
Scotland Singles (OCC)	13
Sweden (Sverigetopplistan)	54
UK Singles (OCC)	9
UK Dance (OCC)	6
UK Indie (OCC)	3
US Hot Dance Airplay (Billboard)	12
