= One Woman's Insanity =

Studio album by Ultra Naté
- Released: October 5, 1993
- Recorded: 1993
- Genre: House
- Length: 53:17
- Labels: Warner Bros. 45330
- Producers: Basement Boys; Nellee Hooper; Soulshock & Cutfather

Ultra Naté chronology
Blue Notes in the Basement (1991)	One Woman's Insanity (1993)	Situation: Critical (1998)

One Woman's Insanity is the second album by dance singer-songwriter Ultra Naté. The record, which incorporated R&B influences as well as Naté's signature house music, was released on October 5, 1993, by Warner Bros. Records. The lead single, "Show Me", was a dance club hit, becoming Naté's first number one on the US dance charts; it also entered the Bubbling Under Hot 100 and the UK singles chart. The follow-up singles "Joy" and "How Long" also reached the top five on the dance charts.

Upon its release, the album received a mixed critical reception. However, it has received favorable recognition in retrospect, with some critics regarding it as a highlight of her discography.

== Release ==
"Show Me" was released in advance of One Woman's Insanity as the album's lead single; it was further promoted with a music video.

== Reception ==
=== Commercial ===
Three of the tracks on One Woman's Insanity entered the Billboard Dance Club Songs chart. "How Long" and "Show Me", in particular, became dance club hits. "Show Me" topped the chart dated January 8, 1994, becoming her first number one; it spent a total of 14 weeks on the chart. "Joy" and "How Long" also entered the dance chart; each peaked at number two, in October 1993 and June 1994 respectively.

"Show Me" also entered the non-genre-specific Billboard Bubbling Under Hot 100 chart, an extension of the Hot 100, peaking at number 22 on the chart dated December 25, 1993. On the Dance Singles Sales chart, the double-A-side release of "Show Me"/"Joy" peaked at number 21 on the September 4, 1993, chart. The single also proved a minor hit in the UK, peaking at number 62 on the UK singles chart dated January 29, 1994.

=== Critical ===
Professional ratings
Review scores
Source	Rating
Allmusic	2.5/5 stars

Initial critical response to the album was mixed. AllMusic awarded the album two and a half stars out of five, commending the album's rhythms as "among the best of their time" and Naté as "more than capable", but also arguing that the album at times strayed into "formulaic territory". However, the album has received some praise in retrospect. In a review of Naté's 2001 album, Stranger than Fiction, Out reflected that One Woman's Insanity was a superior record, calling it a "masterpiece" and evidence that she has "done better" than on Fiction. In 2002, Vibe retrospectively deemed the album "slick and clever".

== Track listing ==
1. "How Long"
2. "You're Not the Only One"
3. "Show Me"
4. "I'm Not Afraid"
5. "Incredibly You"
6. "Joy"
7. "I Specialize in Loneliness"
8. "One Woman's Insanity"
9. "Feelin' Fine"
10. "Love is a Many-Splendored Thing"

== Charts ==
Single Title	Year	Peak chart positions			
Single Title	Year	US	US Dance	US Dance Sales	UK
"Show Me"	1993	122	1	—	62
"Joy"	1993	—	2	—	—
"Show Me"/"Joy" Double A-side	1993	—	—	21	—
"How Long"	1994	—	2	—	—
