= Love's the Only Drug =

Single by Ultra Naté

from the album Grime, Silk, & Thunder
- Released: August 15, 2006
- Length: 5:53
- Label: Tommy Boy Entertainment
- Songwriter(s): Eric Kupper, Ultra Naté, Biran Pope, Ollie Wright
- Producer(s): Eric Kupper, Ultra Naté

Ultra Naté singles chronology
"Freak On" (2005)	"Love's the Only Drug" (2006)	"Automatic" (2007)

Music video
- "Loves the Only Drug" on YouTube

"Love's the Only Drug" is a song performed by American recording artist Ultra Naté. Co-written by Eric Kupper, Ultra Naté, Brian Pope, and Ollie Wright, the song was released as the second single from Ultra Naté's fifth studio album Grime, Silk, & Thunder.

== Music video ==
The music video for "Love's the Only Drug" was directed by Eric Johnson, who had previously worked with Naté when he directed the music video for her song "Get It Up." Johnson's concept for the music video was inspired by the 1975 documentary Grey Gardens.

== Track listing ==
- Digital download
1. "Love's the Only Drug" (Davis & Lewis Soulful House Mix) – 7:45
2. "Love's the Only Drug" (Davis & Lewis Ultra Tribal House Dub Mix) – 6:23
3. "Love's the Only Drug" (Funky Junction, Carrano & Fanelli Mix) – 7:04
4. "Love's the Only Drug" (Christian Paduraru Mix) – 7:54
- US CD maxi-single
1. "Love's the Only Drug" (original radio edit) – 4:25
2. "Love's the Only Drug" (Funky Junction & Antony Reale Subliminal Strings Radio Edit) – 3:26
3. "Love's the Only Drug" (Morgan Page Mix) – 8:20
4. "Love's the Only Drug" (Muzzaik Mix) - 9:49
5. "Love's the Only Drug" (Original Mix) - 5:58
6. "Love's the Only Drug" (Funky Junction & Antony Reale Subliminal Strings Mix) - 7:32
7. "Love's the Only Drug" (Splashfunk & Funky Junction Gryphon Mix) - 6:50
8. "Love's the Only Drug" (Modjuno & Casey Remix) - 6:23

== Charts ==
Chart (2006/2007)	Peak position
Spain (PROMUSICAE)	14
US Hot Dance Club Songs (Billboard)	2
