= So Excited! =

Studio album by the Pointer Sisters
- Released: June 29, 1982
- Studio: Studio 55 (Los Angeles); Larrabee (North Hollywood); Pasha Music House (Los Angeles)
- Genre: R&B, pop, soul
- Length: 34:06 (Standard release); 45:05 (Remastered release)
- Label: Planet
- Producer: Richard Perry

The Pointer Sisters chronology
Black & White (1981)	So Excited! (1982)	Break Out (1983)

Singles from So Excited!
- 1. "American Music" Released: 1982; 2. "I'm So Excited" Released: September 1982; 3. "If You Wanna Get Back Your Lady" Released: 1983

Professional ratings
Review scores
Source	Rating
AllMusic	3/5 stars
Smash Hits	8/10

So Excited! is the ninth studio album by the Pointer Sisters, released in 1982 on the Planet label.

== History ==
So Excited! spawned a hit with "American Music" and included a cover of a Prince tune, "I Feel for You," which was covered by Chaka Khan two years later. The title track reached No. 30 on the pop charts but hit No. 9 when it was revived two years later after being added to the group's 1983 album, Break Out. A third single, "If You Wanna Get Back Your Lady" peaked at No. 67 on the Pop Chart. "See How the Love Goes", was shelved due to its controversial subject matter. The album was remastered and issued on CD with bonus tracks in 2010 by Big Break Records. So Excited! is the first album by the Pointer Sisters to generate three entries on the Billboard Hot 100. It is their only album where all the singles became Hot 100 hits.

== Track listing ==
Side one
No.	Title	Writer(s)	Length
1.	"I'm So Excited"	Anita Pointer, June Pointer, Ruth Pointer, Trevor Lawrence	3:51
2.	"See How the Love Goes"	Terry Britten, Sue Shifrin	4:03
3.	"All of You"	Paul Gordon, Jay Gruska	4:00
4.	"Heart Beat"	Patrick Henderson, Michael Bolotin, Laython Armour	4:22

Side two
No.	Title	Writer(s)	Length
1.	"If You Wanna Get Back Your Lady"	John Lewis Parker, Brian Potter	5:35
2.	"I Feel for You"	Prince	3:58
3.	"Heart to Heart"	Arnie Roman, Matthew Garey	3:32
4.	"American Music"	Parker McGee	3:58

2010 remastered bonus tracks
No.	Title	Length
9.	"I'm So Excited" (12" Mix)	5:41
10.	"If You Wanna Get Back Your Lady" (12" Mix)	6:09

== Personnel ==
The Pointer Sisters

- Anita Pointer – lead vocals (1, 2, 6, 8), backing vocals, vocal arrangements
- June Pointer – lead vocals (3, 5−7), backing vocals, vocal arrangements
- Ruth Pointer – lead vocals (4, 6), backing vocals, vocal arrangements

Musicians

- John Barnes – acoustic piano (1, 8), keyboards (2, 3, 7), Fender Rhodes (6)
- Michael Boddicker – synthesizer programming (1, 4−7)
- Greg Phillinganes – synthesizers (1, 4, 6), synthesizer arrangements (4), synth solo (5−7)
- William "Smitty" Smith – organ (1)
- Robbie Buchanan – vocoder (2), synthesizers (2, 6−8)
- Ed Walsh – synthesizers (2, 3, 5)
- Randy Waldman – keyboards (4)
- Johnny Parker – synthesizers (5), clavinet (5)
- George Doering – guitars (1, 8)
- Lee Ritenour – guitars (1, 2, 8)
- Paul Jackson Jr. – guitars (2−4, 6, 7), guitar solo (4)
- Waddy Wachtel – guitar solo (2)
- Tim May – guitars (3, 6, 7)
- Ira Newborn – guitars (4)
- Nathan Watts – bass (1, 6, 7)
- Nathan East – bass (2−5, 8)
- John Robinson – drums
- Paulinho da Costa – percussion (1−4, 6−8)
- Gary Herbig – saxophones (6)
- Jim Horn – saxophones (6)
- Trevor Lawrence – rhythm track arrangements, horn arrangements (3, 6), tenor sax solo (8)
- Dick "Slyde" Hyde – trombone (3, 6)
- Chuck Findley – trumpet (3, 6)
- Gary Grant – trumpet (3, 6)
- Richard Perry – rhythm track arrangements

Production

- Richard Perry – producer
- Trevor Lawrence – associate producer
- Gabe Veltri – recording, editing, remix assistant
- Bill Schnee – remixing
- Michael Brooks – assistant engineer
- Stuart Furusho – assistant engineer
- Bobby Gerber – assistant engineer
- Larry Emerine – mastering
- Stephen Marcussen – mastering
- Precision Mastering (Hollywood, California) – mastering location
- Susan Epstein – production coordinator
- Bradford Rosenberg – production coordinator
- Eddie Choran – music coordinator
- Peggy Sandvig – music preparation
- Kosh – artwork, design
- Norman Seeff – cover photography

== Charts ==
Chart performance for So Excited!
Chart (1982)	Peak position
US Billboard 200	59
US Billboard Top R&B Albums	24
