= Just a Little More Love (song) =

Single by David Guetta featuring Chris Willis

from the album Just a Little More Love
- Released: July 14, 2001 (France); December 2, 2003 (UK)
- Genre: Dance-pop; funky house
- Length: 3:20 (original edit); 3:45 (Wally López remix edit)
- Label: Virgin Records
- Songwriters: David Guetta; Chris Willis; Jean Charles Carré; Joachim Garraud
- Producers: David Guetta; Joachim Garraud

David Guetta singles chronology
| "Just a Little More Love" (2001) | "Love Don't Let Me Go" (2002) |

Chris Willis singles chronology
| "Just a Little More Love" (2001) | "Love Don't Let Me Go" (2002) |

"Just a Little More Love" is the debut single released by French DJ David Guetta, featuring vocals from American singer Chris Willis. It appears on his debut album, of the same name, and was released as the lead single from that album. The song was recorded in only thirty minutes. There are two versions of the song on the Just a Little More Love album, the original edit, subtitled the elektro edit, and the remix version, the Wally López remix, which is also featured on MoS: Clubbers Guide 2004 and the soundtrack to The Football Factory. The music video for the track was directed by Jean-Charles Carré, and features an appearance by David Guetta, although Chris Willis does not feature.

== Track listing ==
- UK CD single (2003)
1. "Just a Little More Love" (Wally López remix edit)
2. "Just a Little More Love" (elektro edit)
- French CD single (2001)
1. "Just a Little More Love" (elektro edit)
2. "Just a Little More Love" (elektro maxi)
3. "Just a Little More Love" (remix edit)
4. "Just a Little More Love" (remix maxi)
- German CD single (2002)
1. "Just a Little More Love" (elektro edit)
2. "Just a Little More Love" (vocal house edit)
- German maxi single (2002)
1. "Just a Little More Love" (Wally López remix edit)
2. "Just a Little More Love" (elektro edit)
3. "Just a Little More Love" (Problem Kid Fat Bottom funk remix)
- Spanish CD single (2003)
1. "Just a Little More Love" (Wally López remix edit)
2. "Just a Little More Love" (elektro edit)
3. "Just a Little More Love" (Wally López remix)

== Charts ==
| Chart (2001–2003) | Peak position |
|---|---|
| Belgium (Ultratop 50 Flanders) | 29 |
| Belgium (Ultratop 50 Wallonia) | 2 |
| France (SNEP) | 29 |
| Hungary (Dance Top 40) | 28 |
| Hungary (Single Top 40) | 15 |
| Netherlands (Dutch Top 40) | 38 |
| Netherlands (Single Top 100) | 80 |
| Romania (Romanian Top 100) | 33 |
| Switzerland (Schweizer Hitparade) | 59 |
| UK Singles (OCC) | 19 |
| US Dance Club Songs (Billboard) | 15 |
