= Louder (Put Your Hands Up) =

Single by Chris Willis
- Released: June 5, 2010
- Genre: House, dance
- Length: 3:29
- Label: Veneer
- Songwriter(s): Chris Willis, Jonas Jeberg, Mich Hansen
- Producer(s): Jonas Jeberg, Cutfather, Chris Willis

Chris Willis singles chronology
| "Gettin' Over You" (2009) | "Louder (Put Your Hands Up)" (2010) | "Too Much In Love" (2011) |

"Louder (Put Your Hands Up)" is the second solo single by American singer Chris Willis. It's his first single without long-time collaborator David Guetta. The single peaked at number 1 on Hot Dance Club Songs and number 27 in Netherlands. It was written by Chris Willis, Jonas Jeberg, Cutfather, and it was produced by Jeberg and Cutfather with co-production by Willis.

== Music video ==
There is a music video for "Louder (Put Your Hands Up)" on YouTube.

== Track list ==
AUS digital EP

1. "Louder (Put Your Hands Up)" [original radio edit] – 3:29
2. "Louder (Put Your Hands Up)" [original extended mix] – 7:30
3. "Louder (Put Your Hands Up)" [Laurent Wolf mix] – 6:17

USA digital EP

1. "Louder (Put Your Hands Up)" [original mix] – 3:29
2. "Louder (Put Your Hands Up)" [Mixshow mix] – 4:49
3. "Louder (Put Your Hands Up)" [extended mix] – 7:30
4. "Louder (Put Your Hands Up)" [extended instrumental mix] – 4:45

The remixes

1. "Louder (Put Your Hands Up)" [Laurent Wolf mix] – 6:17
2. "Louder (Put Your Hands Up)" [Wawa mix] – 7:03
3. "Louder (Put Your Hands Up)" [Mig and Rizzo extended mix] – 5:53
4. "Louder (Put Your Hands Up)" [S.T.F.U. remix] –7:04
5. "Louder (Put Your Hands Up)" [Simon De Jano + Steve Forest mix] 6:50
6. "Louder (Put Your Hands Up)" [Ray Roc and Gabe Ramos remix] – 7:48
7. "Louder (Put Your Hands Up)" [Eddie Amador remix] – 10:40
8. "Louder (Put Your Hands Up)" [Cato K, Eran Hersh & Darmon Mixshow mix] – 5:36

UK digital EP

1. "Louder (Put Your Hands Up)" [UK radio edit] – 2:50
2. "Louder (Put Your Hands Up)" [extended mix] – 7:30
3. "Louder (Put Your Hands Up)" [Jupiter Ace vocal remix] – 5:38
4. "Louder (Put Your Hands Up)" [Whelan & Di Scala remix] – 5:34
5. "Louder (Put Your Hands Up)" [STFU remix] – 7:04
6. "Louder (Put Your Hands Up)" [Dante Black remix] – 5:40

UK remixes

1. "Louder (Put Your Hands Up)" (Dave Silcox remix) – 4:51
2. "Louder (Put Your Hands Up)" (7th Heaven remix) – 6:19
3. "Louder (Put Your Hands Up)" (Zodiac remix) – 5:37
4. "Louder (Put Your Hands Up)" (LMC remix) – 4:53
5. "Louder (Put Your Hands Up)" (DJ Khama v DJ Montana) – 6:14
6. "Louder (Put Your Hands Up)" (Klubfiller remix) – 5:50

Other versions

- 7th Heaven radio edit – 3:37
- Craig C's Radio Blaster – 3:58
- Whelan & Di Scala edit – 3:54

== Charts ==
| Chart (2010) | Peak position |
|---|---|
| US Hot Dance Club Songs (Billboard) | 1 |
| Netherlands (Dutch Top 40) | 27 |

=== Year-end charts ===
| Chart (2011) | Position |
|---|---|
| US Hot Dance Club Songs (Billboard) | 49 |

== See also ==
- List of number-one dance singles of 2011 (U.S.)
