= Waiting on You (Ultra Naté and Michelle Williams song) =

Single by Ultra Naté and Michelle Williams

from the album Hero Worship
- Released: December 13, 2011
- Recorded: 2009
- Genre: House, dance-pop
- Length: 4:13
- Label: BluFire / Peace Bisquit
- Songwriters: Brinsley Evans, Costantino Padovano, Julien Aletti, Raphael Aletti, Femi Williams
- Producers: Brinsley Evans, The Thrillers, Costantino Padovano

Ultra Naté singles chronology
"Turn it Up" (2011)	"Waiting on You" (2011)

Michelle Williams singles chronology
"On the Run" (2011)	"Waiting on You" (2011)	"If We Had Your Eyes" (2013)

"Waiting on You" is a song by the American recording artists Ultra Naté and Michelle Williams, taken from Naté's sixth studio album, Hero Worship (2012). It was written by Brinsley Evans, Costantino Padovano, Julien Aletti, Raphael Aletti and Femi Williams.

== Background ==
In 2009, Williams told Nick Levine in an interview for Digital Spy that she had "just" recorded "a big dance song with Ultra Naté". Williams described the song as "a big track" titled "I'm Waiting On You" and said "they're doing the final revisions on it at the moment and I'm very, very excited about it". She also revealed that the song would not only be on Naté's next album but possibly on hers also.

== Music video ==
On December 1, 2011, the video director Karl Giant tweeted, "in preproduction for my next music video 'WAITING ON YOU' Starring Ultra Natè and Michelle Williams (Destiny's Child) It's will be on fire! [sic]". The following week, he revealed the music video shoot would commence on December 8, 2011. The video was first shown on YouTube on 2 May 2012.

== Track listing ==
- Digital download – Remixes EP
1. "Waiting on You" (Original Radio Edit) – 4:13
2. "Waiting on You" (Jochen Simms Radio Edit) – 2:55
3. "Waiting on You" (Original Extended) – 8:58
4. "Waiting on You" (Jochen Simms Club Mix) – 6:00
5. "Waiting on You" (Andy Caldwell & Remy Le Dub Mix) – 6:19
6. "Waiting on You" (Eddie Amador DubWork Mix) – 7:50
7. "Waiting on You" (Manny Lehman Main Mix) – 9:37
8. "Waiting on You" (Teddy Douglas Mix) – 5:30
9. "Waiting on You" (Whatever Whatever Mix) – 6:32
10. "Waiting on You" (Original Instrumental) – 4:09
11. "Waiting on You" (Jochen Simms Dub Mix) – 6:00
12. "Waiting on You" (Eddie Amador Instrumental) – 7:49
13. "Waiting on You" (Manny Lehman Dub Mix) – 9:37
- Digital download – Remixes Part Two EP
1. "Waiting on You" (JRMX Club Mix) [JRMX Club Mix] – 7:01
2. "Waiting on You" (Flip Da Scrip Extended Mix) [Flip Da Scrip Extended Mix] – 4:33
3. "Waiting on You" (Count De Money Extended Mix) [Count De Money Extended Mix] – 8:15
4. "Waiting on You" (Automatic Panic Club Mix) [Automatic Panic Club Mix] – 5:12
5. "Waiting on You" (Ian Nieman Club Mix) [Ian Nieman Club Mix] – 6:22
6. "Waiting on You" (Craig C Master Blaster Disco Mix) [Craig C Master Blaster Disco Mix] – 7:52
7. "Waiting on You" (DJ Irene Vocal Mix) [DJ Irene Vocal Mix] – 6:34
8. "Waiting on You" (Splashfunk Remix) [Splashfunk Remix] – 5:38
9. "Waiting on You" (JRMX Instrumental) [JRMX Instrumental] – 6:59
10. "Waiting on You" (Flip Da Scrip Instrumental) [Flip Da Scrip Instrumental] – 4:33
11. "Waiting on You" (Count De Money Instrumental) [Count De Money Instrumental] – 8:14
12. "Waiting on You" (Automatic Panic Dub Mix) [Automatic Panic Dub Mix] – 5:12
13. "Waiting on You" (Ian Nieman Instrumental) [Ian Nieman Instrumental] – 6:22
14. "Waiting on You" (Craig C Instrumental) [Craig C Instrumental] – 7:52

== Charts ==
Chart (2011)	Peak position
US Dance Club Songs (Billboard)	11
