= Break Out (Pointer Sisters album) =

Studio album by the Pointer Sisters
- Released: November 1, 1983
- Studios: Studio 55; Baby 'O Recorders; The Music Grinder; Brian Elliot Studios (Los Angeles, California)
- Genres: Dance-pop; new wave; synth-pop; R&B
- Length: 43:17
- Labels: Planet; RCA
- Producers: Richard Perry; Glen Ballard; Andy Goldmark; Barry Mann; Stephen Mitchell; Howie Rice; Bruce Roberts; Gary Skardina; Brock Walsh

The Pointer Sisters chronology
So Excited! (1982)	Break Out (1983)	Contact (1985)

Singles from Break Out
- 1. "I Need You" Released: October 1983; 2. "Automatic" Released: January 13, 1984; 3. "Jump (For My Love)" Released: April 11, 1984; 4. "Neutron Dance" Released: December 30, 1984; 5. "Baby Come and Get It" Released: March 31, 1985

Professional ratings
Review scores
Source	Rating
AllMusic	4.5/5 stars
Robert Christgau	B+

Break Out is the tenth album by the American female vocal group the Pointer Sisters, released on November 1, 1983, on Planet Records, distributed by RCA Records. It is the Pointer Sisters' most successful album, peaking at number 8 on the Billboard 200 and being certified triple-Platinum by the RIAA.

== Overview ==
Featuring mostly synth-based tunes, the album gave the Pointer Sisters the biggest success of their recording career, spawning four U.S. Top 10 hits—"Jump (For My Love)", "Automatic", "Neutron Dance" and a slightly remixed version of their 1982 hit "I'm So Excited". The latter was included on later editions of the album in the place of the track "Nightline". "Automatic" also became the group's biggest UK hit, peaking at No. 2 and certified Silver by the BPI. "Jump" also made the UK Top 10, peaking at No. 6.

With the remix of "I'm So Excited" added to pressings of the album in mid-1984, a total of six singles were issued from Break Out. The first release was "I Need You", featuring shared lead vocals by the three Pointer Sisters. A mid-tempo number, it was atypical of the album's overall dance sound; the choice of the song as lead single was based on producer Richard Perry's hope that the track would reinstate the Pointer Sisters' presence at R&B radio. "I Need You" did become a major hit on the Billboard R&B chart but did not reach the top 40 of the Billboard Hot 100, stalling at No. 48.

The dance track "Jump (For My Love)", with June Pointer on lead, was intended to be the second single from Break Out; however, another dance track, "Automatic", was substituted in its place, after garnering heavy airplay on radio and in dance clubs as an album track. The first major hit to feature the distinctive contralto of Ruth Pointer on lead, "Automatic" became the first Top 40 hit from Break Out, its No. 5 peak ending a three-year absence by the Pointer Sisters from the Top 10 of the Hot 100. "Automatic" also became the most successful R&B hit by the Pointer Sisters as a trio—its No. 2 R&B peak was bested by "How Long (Betcha' Got a Chick on the Side)", a 1975 No. 1 R&B hit by the group in its original four-woman format. "Jump (For My Love)" was afforded a single release as the follow-up to "Automatic" and, with a No. 3 peak, became the most successful single from Break Out. Titled "Jump" on the first version of the album, it would change to the more well-known "Jump (For My Love)" after Van Halen hit number 1 with "Jump" earlier in 1984.

The re-release of "I'm So Excited"—the one single from Break Out to feature a lead vocal by Anita Pointer, who sang lead on most Pointer Sisters hits—resulted in a third consecutive Top 10 hit for the group, peaking at No. 9. Prior to Break Out, the Pointers had accumulated three earlier Top 10 hits over a 12-year recording career. After the Break Out track "Neutron Dance", with Ruth Pointer on lead vocal, was optioned for the soundtrack of the 1984 film Beverly Hills Cop, it became the album's fifth single and fourth consecutive Top 10 hit, reaching No. 6 on the Hot 100 in February 1985. A sixth single, "Baby, Come and Get It", featuring June Pointer on lead, became a minor hit in the spring of 1985 (No. 44 Hot 100/No. 24 R&B).

Break Out sold over three million copies in the U.S. and won the group two Grammy Awards and two American Music Awards. The 1983 original release and the 1984 re-release were both remastered and issued in a deluxe expanded edition with bonus tracks on CD in 2011 by Big Break Records.

According to Ruth Pointer, she and her sisters were not happy with the title Break Out. "We kept thinking of it as a rash or jail", she said.

== Track listing ==
=== Original 1983 release ===
Side one
No.	Title	Writer(s)	Lead vocalist	Length
1.	"Jump"	Stephen Mitchell, Marti Sharron, Gary Skardina	June Pointer	4:23
2.	"Automatic"	Brock Walsh, Mark Goldenberg	Ruth Pointer	4:48
3.	"Baby Come and Get It"	Barry Mann, James Ingram, Cynthia Weil	June Pointer	4:19
4.	"I Need You"	Nan O'Byrne, Richard Feldman, John Black	Anita, June & Ruth Pointer	4:01
5.	"Dance Electric"	Glen Ballard, Brock Walsh	Ruth Pointer	4:25

Side two
No.	Title	Writer(s)	Lead vocalist	Length
6.	"Neutron Dance"	Allee Willis, Danny Sembello	Ruth Pointer	4:12
7.	"Easy Persuasion"	Bruce Roberts, Andy Goldmark	Anita Pointer	4:34
8.	"Nightline"	Ballard, Davey Faragher, Brie Howard	June Pointer	4:36
9.	"Telegraph Your Love"	Goldmark	Anita Pointer	4:01
10.	"Operator"	Howie Rice, O'Byrne	Anita Pointer	3:58

2011 deluxe expanded edition remastered bonus tracks
No.	Title	Length
11.	"Automatic" (12" Special Remix)	6:06
12.	"Jump (for My Love)" (12" Long Version)	6:24
13.	"I Need You" (UK 12" Special Remix)	5:24
14.	"I'm So Excited" (12" Mix)	5:41
15.	"Neutron Dance" (12" Mix)	5:33
16.	"Baby Come and Get It" (12" Extended Version)	7:13

=== 1984 re-release ===
Side one
No.	Title	Writer(s)	Lead vocalist	Length
1.	"Jump (For My Love)"	Stephen Mitchell, Marti Sharron, Gary Skardina	June Pointer	4:23
2.	"Automatic"	Brock Walsh, Mark Goldenberg	Ruth Pointer	4:48
3.	"I'm So Excited"	Anita Pointer, June Pointer, Ruth Pointer, Trevor Lawrence	Anita Pointer	4:54
4.	"I Need You"	Nan O'Byrne, Richard Feldman, John Black	Anita, June & Ruth Pointer	4:01
5.	"Neutron Dance"	Allee Willis, Danny Sembello	Ruth Pointer	4:12

Side two
No.	Title	Writer(s)	Lead vocalist	Length
6.	"Dance Electric"	Glen Ballard, Brock Walsh	Ruth Pointer	4:25
7.	"Easy Persuasion"	Bruce Roberts, Andy Goldmark	Anita Pointer	4:34
8.	"Baby Come and Get It"	Barry Mann, James Ingram, Cynthia Weil	June Pointer	4:19
9.	"Telegraph Your Love"	Goldmark	Anita Pointer	4:01
10.	"Operator"	Howie Rice, O'Byrne	Anita Pointer	3:58

2011 deluxe expanded edition remastered bonus tracks
No.	Title	Length
11.	"I Need You" (Single Remix)	3:43
12.	"Automatic" (Single Edit)	4:00
13.	"Jump (For My Love)" (Single Remix)	3:38
14.	"I'm So Excited" (Single Remix)	3:50
15.	"Neutron Dance" (Single Edit)	3:51
16.	"Baby Come and Get It" (Single Edit)	4:00
17.	"I Need You" (USA 12" Version)	5:51
18.	"Jump (For My Love)" (12" Instrumental Mix)	6:08

== Personnel ==
The Pointer Sisters

- Anita Pointer – lead vocals (4, 7, 9, 10), backing vocals
- June Pointer – lead vocals (1, 3, 4, 8), backing vocals
- Ruth Pointer – lead vocals (2, 4−6), backing vocals

Musicians

- Howie Rice – Minimoog (1, 5, 9, 10), additional synthesizers (1), electronic drums (1, 3, 8), synthesizers (2−6, 9, 10), guitars (4, 6−8), bass (4), drum machine programming (4, 6, 10), percussion (4, 6, 8, 10), E-mu Emulator (6), acoustic piano (6), organ (6)
- Stephen Mitchell – synthesizers (1, 2, 4), synthesizer programming (1, 5, 6, 10), drum machine programming (1)
- Paul Fox – E-mu Emulator (2, 4−6, 8−10)
- John Van Tongeren – Minimoog (2), synthesizers (2, 4)
- Brock Walsh – synthesizers (2, 5), drum machine programming (2, 5)
- James Ingram – synthesizers (3), drum machine programming (3), backing vocals (3)
- Barry Mann – synthesizers (3), drum machine programming (3)
- Vince Melamed – Fender Rhodes (4)
- Glen Ballard – synthesizers (5), drum machine programming (5, 8)
- Andy Goldmark – synthesizer programming (7), drum machine programming (7, 9)
- Bruce Roberts – synthesizer programming (7), drum machine programming (7)
- Richard Ruttenburg – additional synthesizers (7)
- Tommy Faragher – synthesizers (5, 8), bass (8), theremin (8)
- Greg Phillinganes – Minimoog (8)
- Mark Goldenberg – guitars (2), synthesizers (8)
- Dennis Herring – guitars (2), lead guitar (5)
- David Katay – guitars (3)
- Eddie Watkins Jr. – bass (2)
- Nathan Watts – bass (3)
- Reek Havok – electronic drum programming (1, 3, 4, 6, 8)
- Bob Mithoff – drum machine programming (4, 6, 10)
- Francis Buckley – drum machine programming (5)
- Paulinho da Costa – percussion (1, 4, 5), tambourine (6)

Production

- Richard Perry – producer
- Stephen Mitchell – associate producer (1)
- Gary Skardina – associate producer (1)
- Glen Ballard – associate producer (2, 5, 8)
- Brock Walsh – associate producer (2, 5, 8)
- Barry Mann – associate producer (3)
- Howie Rice – associate producer (4, 6, 10)
- Bruce Roberts – associate producer (7)
- Andy Goldmark – associate producer (7, 9)
- Kosh – art direction, design
- Ron Larson – art direction, design
- Donald Miller – photography
- Susan Epstein – fashion coordinator

Technical credits

- Stephen Marcussen – mastering at Precision Mastering (Hollywood, California)
- Bill Schnee – remixing
- Michael Brooks – recording engineer (1−4, 6, 8−10)
- Gary Skardina – basic track engineer (1)
- Frances Buckley – basic track engineer (5)
- Brian Elliot – basic track engineer (7)
- Stuart Furusho – additional engineer, assistant engineer
- Bobby Gerber – additional engineer, assistant engineer
- Hill Swimmer – additional engineer
- David Dubow – assistant engineer

== Singles ==
- "I Need You" (7" Version) / "Operator" (Alternate Version) [12" single included extended mix of "I Need You"]
- "Automatic" (7" Version) / "Nightline" (LP Version) [12" single included extended mix of "Automatic"]
- "Jump (For My Love)" (7" Remix) / "Heartbeat" [12" single included extended mix of "Jump (For My Love)"]
- "I'm So Excited" (7" Remix) / "Dance Electric" [12" single included extended mix of "I'm So Excited"]
- "Neutron Dance" (7" Version) / "Telegraph Your Love" [12" single included extended mix of "Neutron Dance"]
- "Baby Come and Get It" / "Operator" (LP Version) [12" single included extended mix of "Baby Come and Get It"]

== Charts ==
=== Weekly charts ===
Chart performance
Chart (1983–1985)	Peak position
Australian Albums (Kent Music Report)	17
Canada Top Albums/CDs (RPM)	4
Dutch Albums (Album Top 100)	15
European Albums (Eurotipsheet)	38
New Zealand Albums (RMNZ)	6
Swedish Albums (Sverigetopplistan)	27
UK Albums (Official Charts)	9
US Billboard Top Pop Albums	8
US Billboard Top R&B Albums	6

=== Year-end charts ===
Chart (1984)	Position
Canada Top Albums/CDs (RPM)	38
US Billboard 200	14
Chart (1985)	Position
Canada Top Albums/CDs (RPM)	13
US Billboard 200	16

== Certifications ==
Certifications
Region	Certification	Certified units/sales
Canada (Music Canada)	4× Platinum	400,000^{^}
New Zealand (RMNZ)	Gold	7,500^{^}
United States (RIAA)	3× Platinum	3,000,000^{^}
^{^} Shipments figures based on certification alone.
