= Give It All You Got (Ultra Naté song) =

Single by Ultra Naté featuring Chris Willis

from the album Grime, Silk, & Thunder
- Released: December 4, 2007
- Label: Tommy Boy Entertainment
- Songwriters: Andy Evans, Glenn Evans, Ultra Naté, Chris Willis

Ultra Naté singles chronology
"Automatic" (2007)	"Give It All You Got" (2007)	"Faster Faster Pussycat (Let's Go!)" (2009)

Chris Willis singles chronology
"Love Is Gone" (2007)	"Give It All You Got" (2007)	"Tomorrow Can Wait" (2008)

Music video
- "Give It All You Got" on YouTube

"Give It All You Got" is a song performed by American recording artist Ultra Naté featuring Chris Willis. Co-written by Andy Evans, Glenn Evans, Ultra Naté and Chris Willis, the song was released as the fourth and final single from Ultra Naté's fifth studio album Grime, Silk, & Thunder.

== Track listing ==
- Digital download
1. "Give It All You Got" (original extended mix) – 7:09
2. "Give It All You Got" (Bimbo Jones Extended Mix) – 8:16
3. "Give It All You Got" (Soulcast Progressive Club Mix) – 7:34
4. "Give It All You Got" (Matty's All U Got Soulpop Mix) – 8:40
5. "Give It All You Got" (Nujax Souer Tordue Dub Mix) – 6:34
6. "Give It All You Got" (Lost Daze Mix) – 6:57

== Charts ==
Chart (2008)	Peak position
US Dance Club Songs (Billboard)	1

== See also ==
- List of number-one dance singles of 2008 (U.S.)
