= Just a Little More Love =

Studio album by David Guetta
- Released: 10 June 2002
- Recorded: 2000–01
- Genre: House; electro house; French house
- Length: 49:06
- Label: Virgin; Gum Prod
- Producer: Joachim Garraud; David Guetta

David Guetta chronology
Just a Little More Love (2002)	Guetta Blaster (2004)

Singles from Just a Little More Love
- 1. "Just a Little More Love" Released: 14 July 2001; 2. "Love Don't Let Me Go" Released: 28 February 2002; 3. "People Come People Go" Released: 12 July 2002; 4. "Give Me Something" Released: 6 October 2002; 5. "Just for One Day (Heroes)" Released: 16 June 2003

Just a Little More Love is the debut studio album by David Guetta, released on 10 June 2002 by Virgin and Gum Prod. The album uses two main vocalists, Chris Willis and Barbara Tucker. The title track, "Just a Little More Love", was recorded in only thirty minutes. It was later remixed by Wally López and subsequently featured on MoS: Clubbers Guide 2004 and in the soundtrack to The Football Factory. Four singles were released from the album: "Just a Little More Love", "Love Don't Let Me Go", "People Come People Go" and "Give Me Something". "Love Don't Let Me Go" was re-released in 2006 as a remix with funk band The Egg. The title track also was the first music video for David Guetta, produced by Gum Prod. and featuring Parisian models such as Donny Lewis.

== Commercial performance ==
Just a Little More Love has sold more than 300,000 copies worldwide. It has sales of 4,500 units in the United States, according to Nielsen SoundScan. The album debuted at number 11 in France, before making its peak position of number 6 the next three weeks. The album ended at number 143 after 27 more weeks on the chart. The album made its peak position of number 17 in Switzerland, where it charted for 28 weeks. The album peaked at number 43 in Wallonia, only charting for 2 weeks.

== Critical reception ==
Professional ratings
Review scores
Source	Rating
Allmusic	3/5 stars
Newsic	7/10 stars
Stylus Magazine	B–
PopMatters	Positive

Just a Little More Love has been positively received. David Jeffries of Allmusic called it a "breezy and slick album Stardust never recorded," awarding it 3 out of 5 stars.

== Track listing ==
- All tracks produced by David Guetta and Joachim Garraud. Post-production and remix on "You" by Pierre Hinard and Maxime Desprez.

No.	Title	Writer(s)	Length
1.	"Just a Little More Love (Elektro Edit)" (featuring Chris Willis)	Chris Willis; David Guetta; Joachim Garraud; Jean-Charles Carré	3:20
2.	"Love Don't Let Me Go (Original Edit)" (featuring Chris Willis)	Willis; Guetta; Garraud; Carré	3:36
3.	"Give Me Something (Deep in My Heart) (Vocal Edit)" (featuring Barbara Tucker)	Barbara Tucker; Guetta; Garraud; Carré; Pascal Lemaire	5:44
4.	"You (Remix Edit)" (featuring Chris Willis)	Willis; Hinard; Desprez; Guetta; Garraud; Carré	3:23
5.	"Can't U Feel the Change" (featuring Chris Willis)	Willis; Guetta; Garraud; Carré	4:53
6.	"It's Alright (Preaching Paris)" (featuring Barbara Tucker)	Tucker; Guetta; Garraud; Carré	3:49
7.	"People Come, People Go" (featuring Chris Willis)	Willis; Guetta; Peter Kitsch; Garraud; Carré	3:19
8.	"Sexy 17" (featuring Juan Rozof)	Jack Uzi; Guetta; Pascal Lemaire; Garraud; Carré	3:27
9.	"Atomic Food" (featuring Chris Willis)	Willis; Guetta; Garraud; Carré	3:09
10.	"133"	Guetta; Garraud; Carré	3:41
11.	"Distortion" (featuring Chris Willis)	Willis; Guetta; Garraud; Carré	3:11
12.	"You Are the Music" (featuring Chris Willis)	Willis; Guetta; Garraud; Carré	5:58
13.	"Lately"	Guetta; Garraud; Carré; Lemaire	1:39

European limited edition (bonus tracks)
No.	Title	Writer(s)	Length
14.	"Just a Little More Love (Kid Vicious Remix)" (featuring Chris Willis)	Willis; Guetta; Garraud; Carré	4:21
15.	"Just a Little More Love (Dream Electro Mix)" (featuring Chris Willis)	Willis; Guetta; Garraud; Carré	3:47

Japanese edition (bonus tracks)
No.	Title	Length
14.	"Miscommunication"	3:27

2003 reissue
No.	Title	Length
1.	"Just a Little More Love (Wally Lopez Remix Edit)" (featuring Chris Willis)	3:45
2.	"Love Don't Let Me Go (Original Edit)" (featuring Chris Willis)	3:36
3.	"Give Me Something (Deep in My Heart) (Vocal Edit)" (featuring Barbara Tucker)	5:44
4.	"Can't U Feel the Change" (featuring Chris Willis)	4:53
5.	"It's Alright (Preaching Paris)" (featuring Barbara Tucker)	3:49
6.	"Sexy 17" (featuring Juan Rozof)	3:27
7.	"People Come People Go" (featuring Chris Willis)	3:19
8.	"Just for One Day (Heroes) (Radio Edit)"	3:10
9.	"133"	3:41
10.	"Distortion (Vocal Remix Edit)" (featuring Chris Willis)	3:11
11.	"You Are the Music" (featuring Chris Willis)	5:58
12.	"Lately"	1:39
13.	"Just a Little More Love (Elektro Edit)" (featuring Chris Willis)	3:20

== Charts ==
=== Weekly charts ===
Chart (2002)	Peak position
Belgian Albums (Ultratop Wallonia)	43
French Albums (SNEP)	6
Swiss Albums (Schweizer Hitparade)	17

=== Year-end charts ===
Chart (2002)	Position
French Albums (SNEP)	54
Swiss Albums (Schweizer Hitparade)	100

== Certifications ==
Region	Certification	Certified units/sales
France (SNEP)	2× Gold	200,000^{*}
^{*} Sales figures based on certification alone.
