= People Come People Go =

Single by David Guetta featuring Chris Willis

from the album Just a Little More Love
- Released: 12 July 2002
- Recorded: 2001
- Genre: House
- Length: 3:19
- Label: Virgin
- Songwriters: David Guetta; Chris Willis; Joachim Garraud; Jean Charles Carré; Peter Kitch
- Producers: David Guetta; Joachim Garraud

David Guetta singles chronology
"Love Don't Let Me Go" (2002)	"People Come People Go" (2002)	"Give Me Something" (2002)

Chris Willis singles chronology
"Love Don't Let Me Go" (2002)	"People Come People Go" (2002)	"Money" (2004)

"People Come People Go" is a house song performed by French DJ David Guetta, featuring vocals from American singer and long-time collaborator Chris Willis. The track was released as the third single from the album Just a Little More Love. The single was only released in Germany and France, and was not available in the United Kingdom. The music video for the track does not feature David Guetta or Chris Willis, however, features a group of people interacting amongst the scene of an underpass.

== Track listing ==
- German CD single (2002)
1. "People Come People Go" (Radio Edit)
2. "People Come People Go" (Extended Mix)
- French CD single (2002)
1. "People Come People Go" (Dancefloor Killa Mix)
2. "People Come People Go" (Mekaniko Dub)
3. "People Come People Go" (Extended Mix)
4. "People Come People Go" (Radio Edit)

== Charts ==
Chart (2002)	Peak position
France (SNEP)	42
Switzerland (Schweizer Hitparade)	54
