= Put 'Em High =

2004 single by StoneBridge

Single by StoneBridge featuring Therese

from the album Can't Get Enough
- Released: 16 August 2004
- Length: 5:26 (album version); 3:28 (JJ's radio edit)
- Label: Playground Music Scandinavia; Hed Kandi
- Songwriters: StoneBridge; Therese Grankvist; Klas B Wahl; George Nakas
- Producer: StoneBridge

StoneBridge singles chronology
"Put 'Em High" (2004)	"Take Me Away" (2005)

"Put 'Em High" is a song by Swedish producer StoneBridge from his album Can't Get Enough (2004). The song was released through Hed Kandi in the United Kingdom and features vocals from Therese. The radio edit by JJ reached number six on the UK Singles Chart, number 26 in Ireland, and number 33 in Australia.

Therese re-released the song on her label Vixon Records in 2015. In 2016, the track was re-released on StoneBridge's label Stoney Boy Music, along with new remixes. This re-release reached number one on the US Billboard Dance Club Play chart. The updated radio edit was subsequently featured on the re-release of the album Can't Get Enough.

== Track listings ==
Swedish CD single

1. "Put 'Em High" (radio edit) – 4:04
2. "Put 'Em High" (album version) – 5:25

Swedish maxi-CD single

1. "Put 'Em High" (radio edit) – 4:04
2. "Put 'Em High" (album version) – 5:25
3. "Put 'Em High" (JJ club mix) – 8:21
4. "Put 'Em High" (Stockholm Sound Machine mix) – 6:40
5. "Put 'Em High" (Seamus Haji mix) – 7:20
6. "Put 'Em High" (Axwell mix) – 6:34
7. "Put 'Em High" (Steve Angello & Sebastian Ingrosso remix) – 6:31

UK and Australian CD single

1. "Put 'Em High" (JJ's radio edit)
2. "Put 'Em High" (JJ's club mix)
3. "Put 'Em High" (Dancing Divaz remix)
4. "Put 'Em High" (The Sharp Boys Funky Fiesta mix)
5. "Put 'Em High" (Seamus Haji full vocal mix)
6. "Put 'Em High" (Lief remix)
7. "Put 'Em High" (promo video)

UK 12-inch single 1

A1. "Put 'Em High" (JJ's club mix)
B1. "Put 'Em High" (Dancing Divaz remix)
B2. "Put 'Em High" (Axwell remix)

UK 12-inch single 2

A1. "Put 'Em High" (The Sharp Boys Funky Fiesta mix)
B1. "Put 'Em High" (Seamus Haji full vocal mix)
B2. "Put 'Em High" (Lief remix)

Digital download

1. "Put 'Em High" (radio edit) – 4:00
2. "Put 'Em High" (JJ's radio edit) – 3:27
3. "Put 'Em High" (JJ's club mix) – 8:20
4. "Put 'Em High" (Dancing Divaz remix) – 6:59
5. "Put 'Em High" (The Sharp Boys Funky Fiesta mix) – 7:04
6. "Put 'Em High" (Seamus Haji full vocal mix) – 8:46
7. "Put 'Em High" (Axwell remix) – 6:35
8. "Put 'Em High" (Steve Angello & Sebastian Ingrosso remix) – 6:30
9. "Put 'Em High" (Stockholm Sound Machine mix) – 6:43
10. "Put 'Em High" (Lief remix) – 5:22

== Charts ==
=== Weekly charts ===
Chart (2004–2005)	Peak position
Australia (ARIA)	33
Australian Club Chart (ARIA)	7
Australian Dance (ARIA)	5
Belgium (Ultratip Bubbling Under Flanders)	3
Ireland (IRMA)	26
Ireland Dance (IRMA)	3
Netherlands (Single Top 100)	58
Romania (Romanian Top 100)	54
Scotland Singles (OCC)	11
UK Singles (OCC)	6
UK Dance (OCC)	1
UK Indie (OCC)	1
US Dance Club Play (Billboard)	40
US Dance Radio Airplay (Billboard)	5

Chart (2016)	Peak position
US Dance Club Songs (Billboard)	1
US Dance/Electronic Singles Sales (Billboard)	32

=== Year-end charts ===
Chart (2004)	Position
Australian Club Chart (ARIA)	24
UK Singles (OCC)	137

Chart (2005)	Position
US Hot Dance Airplay (Billboard)	12

== See also ==
- List of number-one dance singles of 2016 (U.S.)
