= Turn It Up (Ultra Naté song) =

Single by Ultra Naté

from the album Hero Worship
- Released: 2011
- Genre: Dance, Disco
- Label: Deep Sugar Music, Strictly Rhythm
- Songwriters: Brinsley Evans, Lisa Molina, Julien Aletti, Raphael Aletti, Femi Williams
- Producers: Brinsley Evans, The Thrillers

Ultra Naté singles chronology
"Destination" (2010)	"Turn It Up" (2011)	"Waiting on You" (2011)

Music video
- "Turn It Up" on YouTube

"Turn It Up" is a song performed by American recording artist Ultra Naté. Co-written by Brinsley Evans, Lisa Molina, Julien Aletti, Raphael Aletti, Femi Williams, the song was released as the lead single from Ultra Naté's upcoming album Hero Worship.

== Composition ==
In an interview with Miami New Times, Ultra Naté described the song as "more of a disco-pop record" that draws influences from Donna Summer's song "I Feel Love".

== Critical reception ==
Michaelangelo Matos from Resident Advisor described the song as "effortlessly built, but the chorus is its weakest point—the close-voiced, quick-sung up-and-down part, specifically. [...], though—the Auto-tune layers are judicious and give an already sheeny performance some extra shine."

== Track listing ==
- Digital download (Club mixes)
1. "Turn It Up" (Thrillers Original Extended Mix) – 4:53
2. "Turn It Up" (Paul Oakenfold Vocal Mix) – 7:08
3. "Turn It Up" (Wawa Club Mix) – 5:48
4. "Turn It Up" (Wawa Electro Club Mix) – 6:04
5. "Turn It Up" (Muthafunkaz Main Mix) – 7:10
6. "Turn It Up" (Ruff Loaderz vs Scott Giles Club Mix) – 6:03
- Digital download (Dub/instrumental mixes)
1. "Turn It Up" (Paul Oakenfold Dub) – 7:08
2. "Turn It Up" (Wawa Dub) – 5:49
3. "Turn It Up" (Ruff Loaderz vs Scott Giles Dub) – 6:06
4. "Turn It Up" (Muthafunkaz Catch a Beat Down Dub) – 4:53
5. "Turn It Up" (Wawa Electro Dub) – 6:02

== Charts ==
Chart (2011)	Peak position
US Dance Club Songs (Billboard)	4
