= You Give Me Something =

You Give Me Something may refer to:

- "You Give Me Something" (Jamiroquai song), 2001
- "You Give Me Something" (James Morrison song), 2006
