= Stranger than Fiction (Ultra Nate album) =

Stranger Than Fiction

Studio album by Ultra Naté
- Released: April 24, 2001 (US) 2000 (Europe and Japan)
- Recorded: 2000
- Genres: Electronica; tribal house; vocal house; jazz; rock; folk
- Label: Strictly Rhythm

Ultra Naté chronology
Situation: Critical (1998)	Stranger Than Fiction (2001)	Grime, Silk, & Thunder (2007)

Singles from Stranger Than Fiction
- 1. "Desire" Released: 2000; 2. "Get It Up (The Feeling)" Released: 2001; 3. "I Don't Understand It" Released: 2002; 4. "Twisted" Released: 2002

Professional ratings
Review scores
Source	Rating
AllMusic	2.5/5 stars
Vibe	3.5/5 stars

Stranger than Fiction is the fourth album by singer-songwriter, Ultra Naté. This album was released in the USA on April 24, 2001, on the label Strictly Rhythm after already released in 2000 in Europe and Japan.

== Overview ==
This is a concept album where each song is like the chapters of a novel. The album also expands beyond her house repertoire, exploring disco, soul, jazz, folk, and pop rock. Includes the hit singles, "Desire", "Get It Up (The Feeling)" (both No. 1 club hits), "I Don't Understand It", and "Twisted". The Japanese import version of this album includes two bonus tracks, "Runaway" and a rendition of the Bee Gees hit, "How Deep Is Your Love".

== Track listing ==
No.	Title	Writer(s)	Length
1.	"Love Is Stranger Than Fiction"	Nona Hendryx, Rex Rideout	2:33
2.	"Ain't Looking For Nothing"	Arnthor, Christian Karlsson, Patrick Tucker	5:38
3.	"Get It Up (The Feeling)"	Arnthor, Chris Jasper, Karlsson, Ernie Isley, Marvin Isley, O'Kelly Isley, Tucker, Ronald Isley, Rudolph Isley	4:29
4.	"Desire"	Craig Ross, Gerry DeVeaux	4:12
5.	"Dear John"	Ed Baden-Powell, Kwame Kwaten, Merria Ross, Lauren Rinder, Michael Lewis, Steve Marston	4:52
6.	"Eternal"	Powell, Kwaten, Lati Kronlund, Marston	5:55
7.	"Twisted"	Dennis McFarlane, Powell, Kwaten, Mark Clair, Marston	6:41
8.	"Pretender"	Charlie Mole, Gerry DeVeaux	4:45
9.	"Breakfast For Two"		4:34
10.	"I Don't Understand It"	John Ciafone, Lem Springsteen	6:55
11.	"Gone Like Yesterday"	Angus Campbell, DeVeaux, Ian Wallmart	5:07
12.	"Love Is Stranger Than Fiction" (Epilogue)		0:52
13.	"Ghost"	Chris Thomas, N'Dea Davenport	5:11

UK bonus tracks
No.	Title	Length
14.	"Free" (Mood II Swing Radio Edit)	3:40
15.	"Get It Up (The Feeling)" (Full Intention Radio Edit)	3:00
16.	"Desire" (Video)
