= StoneBridge (DJ) =

Swedish music producer (born 1961)

- Born: Sten Hallström; 2 July 1961 (age 65); Sweden
- Genre: EDM
- Occupations: DJ, record producer
- Label: Stoney Boy Music

Sten Hallström, also known by his stage name StoneBridge, is a Swedish DJ and record producer. He received international acclaim with his remix of the 1993 hit "Show Me Love" by Robin S. and his remix of "Closer" by Ne-Yo which received a 2008 Grammy nomination.

StoneBridge is also a resident on SiriusXM/Utopia with his show The StoneBridge Show every Friday 9 pm (PST) and Saturday 11 pm (PST) over North America. He also mixes his weekly StoneBridge Essential House podcast and runs record label Stoney Boy Music.

== Biography ==
StoneBridge started releasing remix records in the 1980s with the label Remixed Records; he had also been running the Swedish DJ/remix outfit SweMix, formed at the end of the 1980s.

He has released several 12" remixes, CDs, and has several singles, including "Put 'Em High", "Take Me Away" and "Freak On" from the debut album Can't Get Enough in 2005. Some of his singles featured the Swedish vocalist Therese. In 2006, he released a DJ mix album, The Flavour the Vibe, as well as started working on his follow-up studio album Music Takes Me, which was released in 2007. The follow-up The Flavour the Vibe Vol. 2 was released in 2008, as well as a Best of Stoney Boy Music mix album for iTunes. A third studio album, The Morning After was released in 2010.

In 2008, StoneBridge remixed Ne-Yo's track "Closer", and the comeback single from New Kids on the Block, featuring Ne-Yo, entitled "Single". StoneBridge garnered a Grammy Award nomination for his remix of "Closer". In 2012, StoneBridge received a BMI Songwriter of the Year award for his contribution to Jason Derulo's "Don't Wanna Go Home".

StoneBridge has released several successful singles such as "Be Kind" (with Crystal Waters, 2014), "You Can Have It All" and "Believe It" (both featuring Koko LaRoo, 2015), "Turn It Down for What" (featuring Seri, 2017), and the No. 1 Billboard Club chart singles "If You Like It" (featuring Elsa Li Jones), "Put 'Em High" (featuring Therese), and "Meet in the Middle" (featuring Haley Joelle).

In the following decades, contemporary remixes have included "No Tears Left to Cry" by Ariana Grande, "Move to Miami" by Enrique Iglesias featuring Pitbull, "Beautiful Trauma" by Pink, "Me and My Imagination" by Sophie Ellis-Bextor, "Talkin' 2 Myself" by Ayumi Hamasaki, "Gimme More" by Britney Spears and the Diana Ross classics "Upside Down"/"I'm Coming Out" and "Ain't No Mountain High Enough".

In 2023, StoneBridge released the singles "Starry Night" featuring K Syran, "Too Late" featuring Kiyoné, "You Don't Know (2022 Remixes)" and "You Can Have It All (2023 Mixes)".

== Discography ==
=== Studio albums ===
- Can't Get Enough (2004)
- Music Takes Me (2007)
- The Morning After (2010)
- Can't Get Enough (2016 Deluxe Version) (2016)

=== Mix albums ===
- StoneBridge – All Nite Long (1998)
- StoneBridge – Fast Funky & Furious (2000)
- The Flavour, the Vibe (2006)
- The Best of Stoney Boy Music (2008)
- The Flavour, the Vibe Vol. 2 (2008)
- The Flavour, the Vibe Vol. 3 (2009)

=== Compilations ===
- RMXD (2022)

=== Singles ===
List of singles, with selected chart positions
Title	Year	Chart positions	
Title	Year	AUS	UK
"Put 'Em High" (featuring Therese)	2004	33	6
"Time of Our Lives"	2004	–	–
"Take Me Away" (featuring Therese)	2005	47	9
"Freak On" (vs. Ultra Naté)	2005	60	37
"SOS"	2007	–	–
"You Don't Know"	2007	–	–
"All I Can Think of Is You"	2007	–	–
"Close to Heaven"	2008	–	–
"Let It Go"	2008	–	–
"The Morning After"	2010	–	–
"Trip'en"	2010	–	–
"Rescue Me" (with Chris Kaeser and Anita Kelsey)	2010	–	–
"Love Me" (with Chris Kaeser and Krista Richards)	2012	–	–
"Sthlm Sunrise" (with Chris Sammarco)	2013	–	–
"Music Man" (with Caroline D'Amore)	2013	–	–
"Hold On" (StoneBridge UK Mix; with Matt Aubrey & Holevar)	2014	–	–
"Global Warning" (with Caroline D'Amore)	2014	–	–
"Be Kind" (with Crystal Waters)	2014	–	–
"You Can Have It All" (with Luv Gunz and Koko LaRoo)	2014	–	–
"Losing Control" (with Amie M)	2015	–	–
"Out of Nowhere" (with Jamie Lee Wilson)	2015	–	–
"Believe It" (with Luv Gunz and Koko LaRoo)	2015	–	–
"If You Like It" (featuring Elsa Li Jones)	2016	–	–
"Put 'Em High 2016" (featuring Therese)	2016	–	–
"Turn It Down for What" (featuring Seri)	2017	–	–
"Meet in the Middle" (featuring Haley Joelle)	2017	–	–
"Right Here Right Now" (featuring Haley Joelle)	2018	–	–
"Boyface"	2018	–	–
"Be Cool Be Nice"	2018	–	–
"Not Alone" (featuring DiscoVer.)	2019	–	–
"Chilled"	2019	–	–
"Love Terminator" (featuring Crystal Waters)	2021	–	–
"And It Hurts" (with DaYeene; StoneBridge 2021 Remixes)	2021	–	–
"Somebody" (featuring Elsa Li Jones)	2021	–	–
"She Comes for Ya" (featuring Diandra Faye)	2022	–	–
"You Don't Know" (2022 Remixes)	2022	–	–
"Too Late" (featuring Kiyoné)	2023	–	–
"Starry Night" (featuring K-Syran)	2023	–	–

=== Selected remixes ===
- Alexandra Burke — "Start Without You"
- AP3 (featuring Flo Rida) — "Have It All"
- Ariana Grande — "no tears left to cry"
- Axwell — "Jazzplayer"
- Ayumi Hamasaki — "Talkin' 2 Myself"
- Britney Spears — "Gimme More"
- Cher — "You Haven't See the Last of Me"
- Dario G — "Say What's On Your Mind"
- Diana Ross — "Ain't No Mountain High Enough"
- Deborah Cox — "Let the World Be Ours Tonight"
- Deborah Harry — "Two Times Blue"
- Enrique Iglesias — "Escape"
- Eurythmics — "Here Comes the Rain Again"
- Jennifer Hudson — "If This Isn't Love"
- Justice — "New Lands"
- Jessica Jarrell — "Armageddon"
- La Bouche — "Sweet Dreams"
- Lily Allen — "The Fear"
- Locnville — "Sun In My Pockets"
- Lucie Vondrackova — "Ty jsi ten nej"
- Lulu — "Goodbye Baby and Amen"
- Melanie C — "I Turn to You"
- Metro (featuring Nelly Furtado) — "Sticks & Stones"
- Missy Elliott (featuring Ciara & Fatman Scoop) — "Lose Control"
- Natasha Bedingfield — "Pocketful of Sunshine"
- Ne-Yo — "Closer"
- *NSYNC — "Here We Go"/"Tearin' Up My Heart"
- Paradiso Girls (featuring Lil' Jon & Eve) — "Patron Tequila"
- Paul Morrell (featuring Katherine Ellis) — "Keep On Loving Me"
- Paul Smith — "Hey Pluto! (Inspire By Original Mickey Mouse Cartoons)"
- Robin S — "Show Me Love"/"Back It Up"/"Luv 4 Luv"
- Roxette — "The Centre of the Heart"
- Shaggy — "Boombastic"
- Sia — "The Girl You Lost to Cocaine"
- Sophie Ellis-Bextor — "Me and My Imagination"
- Usher (featuring Young Jeezy) — "Love in This Club"
- Dannii Minogue — "Touch Me Like That"
- The Pussycat Dolls — "Whatcha Think About That"
- Sybil — "Stronger"
- Taio Cruz — "Dynamite"
- WTS (featuring Gia) — "One Night"
- Yoko Ono — "Give Me Something"
- 2Pac (featuring The Notorious B.I.G., Dramacydal, and Stretch) - "Runnin' from tha Police"
