= Give Me Something (David Guetta song) =

Single by David Guetta featuring Barbara Tucker & The Isley Brothers

from the album Just a Little More Love
- Released: October 6, 2002
- Recorded: 2001
- Genre: French house, disco
- Length: 5:44
- Label: Virgin
- Songwriters: David Guetta; Joachim Garraud; Barbara Tucker; Jean Charles Carré; Pascal Lemaire
- Producers: David Guetta; Joachim Garraud

David Guetta singles chronology
"People Come People Go" (2002)	"Give Me Something" (2002)	"Just for One Day (Heroes)" (2003)

Barbara Tucker singles chronology
"Love's on Time" (2001)	"Give Me Something" (2002)	"Let Me Be" (2003)

"Give Me Something" is a house song performed by French DJ David Guetta, featuring vocals from American singer-songwriter Barbara Tucker. The track was released as the fourth single from his debut studio album, Just a Little More Love. The single was only released in France. No music video exists for the track.

== Track listing ==
- French CD single
1. "Give Me Something" (Fonkyfunk Mix) – 7:32
2. "Give Me Something" (Extended Original Mix) – 7:29
3. "It's Allright" (Bob Sinclar Remix) – 6:31
4. "It's Allright" (Extended Original Mix) – 5:45
5. "Give Me Something" (Radio Edit) – 3:15
