= Ultra Naté =

American singer-songwriter (born 1968)

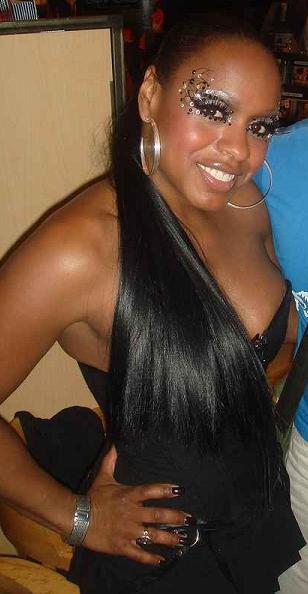
- Ultra Naté in 2007

Background information
- Born: March 20, 1968 (age 58); Havre de Grace, Maryland, U.S.
- Genres: Dance; garage house; R&B
- Occupations: Singer; songwriter; record producer; promoter; DJ
- Years active: 1989–present
- Labels: Warner Bros. Records; Strictly Rhythm Records; Silver Label/Tommy Boy Entertainment; Blufire/Peacebisquit; Grand Groove Records
- Website: www.ultranate.com www.facebook.com/ultranatemusic/

Ultra Naté (born March 20, 1968) is an American singer, songwriter, record producer, DJ, and promoter who has achieved success on the pop charts with songs such as "Free", "If You Could Read My Mind" (as part of Stars on 54), "Automatic", and "Movin' to the Sun".

Virtually all of her singles have reached the Top 10 of the US Hot Dance Club Play chart. These singles include "Show Me", "Free", "Desire", "Get It Up (the Feeling)", "Love's the Only Drug", and her number-one hits "Automatic", "Give It All You Got" featuring Chris Willis, "Waiting On You", and "Everybody Loves the Night". In December 2016, Billboard magazine ranked her as the 12th-most successful dance artist of all time so far.

== Biography ==
=== Early life ===
Born in Havre de Grace, Maryland, United States, Naté displayed her singing talent at an early age. Growing up, she enjoyed a wide variety of music and listened to artists such as Marvin Gaye and Boy George, who Naté later said helped her become more open to being experimental with her style and music production.

She is best known for her 1990s dance crossover track Free. Her 1998 cover of Gordon Lightfoot's "If You Could Read My Mind," with Amber and Jocelyn Enriquez as Stars on 54, was a minor mainstream American hit. It reached No. 52 on the Billboard Hot 100 chart and No. 3 on the Billboard Hot Dance Music/Club Play chart. She has had club success in the United States, but the majority of her singles and, especially, album sales success has been in Europe.

=== Career ===
Ultra Naté began her recording career on a major label, Warner Bros. Records, signed through its British offices. Through it, she released her first two albums. Her debut album, Blue Notes in the Basement (1991), was created along with the Basement Boys, and it featured the singles "It's Over Now", "Deeper Love (Missing You)", "Is It Love", and the gospel-tinged "Rejoicing".

In 1993, the alternative dance/house album One Woman's Insanity was released. Although it still featured the Basement Boys' production on several tracks, this time Ultra worked with Nellee Hooper and D-Influence. At a time when soulful house music performers such as Robin S and Crystal Waters were scoring crossover Top Ten pop singles, it was believed that Ultra Naté would achieve a similar level of commercial success. However, mainstream sales were not realized, even though "Show Me" received moderate mainstream pop radio airplay. Singles included "How Long", "Show Me" (her first song to reach the top position on the US Dance charts), and "Joy". However, neither release sold well, and she was dropped from the label.

In 1995, Ultra Naté contributed the song "Party Girl (Turn Me Loose)" to the soundtrack of the independent film Party Girl starring Parker Posey. The single was commercially released by the King Street Sounds label.

When Warner Bros. attempted to push her in another direction, Ultra Naté left the major label and moved to the independent dance label Strictly Rhythm. It was here that "Free", her biggest mainstream hit, was released in 1997. The song, co-written by Naté, Lem Springsteen, and John Ciafone, with production by both Springsteen and Ciafone, enjoyed heavy airplay throughout the summer, not only in clubs but also on rhythmic and mainstream radio stations in America and Europe. "Free" peaked at number 75 on the US Billboard Hot 100. It became a substantial hit in the United Kingdom, where it peaked at number four on the UK Singles Chart, helping its parent album Situation: Critical reach number seventeen on the UK Albums Chart. It was also successful in Canada, where it peaked at number ten on the Canadian Singles Chart.

It was with this album that Ultra Naté achieved her greatest commercial success, particularly in Europe, where singles such as "Found a Cure" (No. 6 in the UK) and "New Kind of Medicine" (No. 14 in the UK) also charted.

In 1998, a new single, "Pressure," was released internationally. Taken from the soundtrack to the film The 24 Hour Woman, it contained three club mixes. The original version of the track was found on Situation: Critical, but listed as "Release the Pressure."

Her follow-up album Stranger Than Fiction, released in 2001, featured the production work of artists such as Attica Blues, 4 Hero, and Mood II Swing. Four singles were released: "Desire," "Get It Up (The Feeling)," "Twisted," and "I Don't Understand It."

Naté contributed the song "Wonderful Place" to the AIDS benefit compilation Keep Hope Alive: A Lifebeat Benefit Compilation. Additionally, in 2004, she released the singles "Feel Love," "Brass in Pocket," "Time of Our Lives" (released as "Ultra Devoted featuring Ultra Naté and Gerry DeVeaux"), and a new version of "Free" that featured twelve new mixes. In 2005, she collaborated with Gaudino and released the single "Bitter Sweet Melody." Later that year, she appeared again on the charts when her featured vocals on the StoneBridge single "Freak On" became a successful dance hit. She also performed on the British show Hit Me Baby One More Time.

Having become a mother for the first time in the fall of 2005, Naté released her fifth album Grime, Silk, & Thunder on her newly created imprint Blufire in partnership with Tommy Boy Records. The first single released was "Love's the Only Drug", which became available through the US iTunes Store on August 8, 2006, and reached number two on the American Hot Dance Club Play chart, also making the Top 30 on the Hot Dance Airplay chart. The second single, "Automatic" (a cover version of the Pointer Sisters hit), reached number one on the US Hot Dance Club Play chart (the week ending April 28, 2007). It also received airplay on Rhythmic/Dance radio, where it reached the Top 30 on most playlists in this format. Following "Automatic," Ultra released "Give It All You Got," featuring Chris Willis, in December 2007. The song hit No. 1 on the Billboard Dance Music/Club Play charts the week ending February 23, 2008.

In mid-2009, it was announced that US singer Michelle Williams, previously of Destiny's Child, had collaborated on a song with Ultra called "I'm Waiting On You," for use on both of their next studio albums. In 2010, Ultra released a Bob Sinclar remix of her hit "Free" on Strictly Rhythm. She also collaborated with Quentin Harris on "Give It 2 U" for his album Sacrifice. Additionally, she released "Destination" in collaboration with Tony Moran, which peaked at No. 10 on the Billboard Dance Play chart. "Destination" was the second single off Tony's album, Mix Magic Music.

In 2010, she released an EP titled Things Happen At Night, featuring Ultra's pop and soul melodies and vocals over percussive club beats by Unruly Productions. In January 2011, Ultra's next single, "Turn It Up," was released with a music video directed by Leo Herrera. "Turn It Up" was the first single from her sixth studio album, Hero Worship.

In September 2011, she submitted the song "My Love" to represent Switzerland in the Eurovision Song Contest 2012, to be held in Baku, Azerbaijan. However, although it was close, the song failed to reach the final.

In 2013, she held a residency at Café Olé at Space, Ibiza. She has performed at the New York's massive Summer Stage in Central Park, Nile Rodgers' acclaimed FOLD Festival, where she shared the stage with CHIC, Duran Duran, Pharrell, and Beck, as well as Lincoln Center's annual Midnight Summer Swing and numerous Pride events around the world.

Ultra's 2017 album collaboration, Ultra Naté & Quentin Harris as Black Stereo Faith, reached the iTunes Top 10 upon release.

In 2022, she released her tenth studio album, "Ultra", through Blufire/Peacebisquit. In 2023, the deluxe edition of the album was released, with 4 additional songs.

== Awards and nominations ==
Award	Year	Category	Nominee(s)	Result	Ref.
Billboard Music Awards	1997	Top Hot Dance Club Play Single	"Free"	Nominated	
Billboard Music Awards	1998	Top Hot Dance Club Play Single	"Found a Cure"	Nominated	
Billboard Music Awards	1998	Top Hot Dance Club Play Artist	Herself	Nominated	
International Dance Music Awards	1998	Best Dance Solo Artist	Herself	Won	
International Dance Music Awards	1998	Best House/Garage 12"	"Free"	Won	
International Dance Music Awards	1998	Best Pop 12" Dance Record	"Free"	Won	
International Dance Music Awards	2008	Best Dance Solo Artist	Herself	Nominated	
International Dance Music Awards	2011	Best House/Garage Dance Track	"Give It 2 U"	Nominated	
Music Week Awards	2023	Music & Brand Partnership	Becky Hill x Stefflon Don x Ultra Naté x Pepsi MAX – UEFA Women’s EURO 2022 Final Show	Nominated	

== Discography ==
=== Albums ===
==== Studio albums ====
- Blue Notes in the Basement (1991)
- One Woman's Insanity (1993)
- Situation: Critical (1998)
- Stranger Than Fiction (2001)
- Grime, Silk, & Thunder (2007)
- Hero Worship (2013)
- Black Stereo Faith (2017)
- Ultra (2022)

==== Compilation albums ====
- The Best Remixes, Vol. 1 (1997)
- Best Remixes, Vol. 2 (1999)
- Alchemy - G.S.T. Reloaded (2008)

=== Extended plays ===
- Things Happen at Night (2010)

=== Singles ===
Year	Title	Peak chart positions					Certifications (sales thresholds)	Album
Year	Title	US	US Dance	AUS	CAN	UK	Certifications (sales thresholds)	Album
1989	"It's Over Now"	—	—	—	—	62		Blue Notes in the Basement
1991	"Is It Love?"	—	45	—	—	71		Blue Notes in the Basement
1992	"Rejoicing (I'll Never Forget)"	—	7	—	—	—		Blue Notes in the Basement
1993	"Joy"	—	2	—	—	77		One Woman's Insanity
1994	"Show Me"	—	1	—	—	62		One Woman's Insanity
1994	"How Long"	—	2	—	—	—		One Woman's Insanity
1997	"Free"	75	1	31	10	4	BPI: 2× Platinum	Situation: Critical
1998	"Free (Remix)"	—	—	—	—	33		Situation: Critical
1998	"Found a Cure"	—	1	127	—	6		Situation: Critical
1998	"New Kind of Medicine"	—	28	—	—	14		Situation: Critical
1998	"Release the Pressure"	—	3	—	—	—		Situation: Critical
1998	"If You Could Read My Mind" (Stars on 54: Ultra Naté, Amber, Jocelyn Enriquez)	52	3	3	7	23	ARIA: Gold	54 soundtrack
2000	"Desire"	—	1	—	—	40		Stranger Than Fiction
2001	"Get It Up (The Feeling)"	—	1	—	—	51		Stranger Than Fiction
2002	"I Don't Understand It"	—	25	—	—	—		Stranger Than Fiction
2002	"Twisted"	—	—	—	—	—		Stranger Than Fiction
2003	"Brass in Pocket"	—	8	—	—	—		Non-album single
2004	"Free" (Remixes) (Oscar G, Brick City, Corbett & Troia remix)	—	22	—	—	—		Free (Remixes)
2005	"Freak On" (Ultra Naté vs Stonebridge)	—	—	—	—	37		Grime, Silk, & Thunder
2006	"Love's the Only Drug"	—	2	—	—	—		Grime, Silk, & Thunder
2007	"Automatic"	—	1	—	—	—		Grime, Silk, & Thunder
2007	"Give It All You Got" (with Chris Willis)	—	1	—	—	—		Grime, Silk, & Thunder
2008	"Twisted (Got Me Goin' Round)"	—	3	—	—	—		GST: Grime Silk & Thunder Reloaded
2009	"Faster Faster Pussycat (Let’s Go!)"	—	—	—	—	—		Things Happen at Night
2009	"Hey DJ"	—	—	—	—	—		Things Happen at Night
2011	"Turn It Up"	—	4	—	—	—		Hero Worship
2011	"My Love"	—	—	—	—	—		Hero Worship
2011	"Waiting on You" (with Michelle Williams)	—	11	—	—	—		Hero Worship
2013	"Everybody Loves the Night"	—	29	—	—	—		Hero Worship
2014	"Unconditional"	—	2	—	—	—		Hero Worship
2014	"So Glamorous" (with Samuele Sartini)	—	—	—	—	—		Non-album singles
2015	"Take Care of My Heart" (with Eddie Amador)	—	21	—	—	—		Non-album singles
2016	"Alive"	—	—	—	—	—		Non-album singles
2017	"I'm Too Sexy (Touch This Skin)"	—	7	—	—	—		Black Stereo Faith
2017	"Fake" (S-Man & Ultra Naté)	—	—	—	—	—		Non-album single
2020	"Free (Live Your Life)"	—	—	—	—	—		Free (Live Your Life) (Remixes)
2022	"Supernatural" (with Funk Cartel)	—	—	—	—	—		Ultra & Ultra Deluxe
2022	"Miracle"	—	—	—	—	—		Ultra & Ultra Deluxe
2022	"You're Free" (with Icona Pop)	—	—	—	—	—		Ultra & Ultra Deluxe
2022	"Fun"	—	—	—	—	—		Ultra & Ultra Deluxe
2022	"Rich M*fks" (with Henrik Schwarz)	—	—	—	—	—		Ultra & Ultra Deluxe
2022	"Survivor" (with Tracy Young)	—	—	—	—	—		Ultra & Ultra Deluxe
2023	"Free (Do What U Want)" (with Pete Tong, LP Giobbi, Jules Buckley)	—	—	—	—	—		Non-album singles
2023	"Fierce" (with Angelica Ross & Mila Jam)	—	—	—	—	—		Non-album singles
2023	"Dangerous (So Dare Me)" (with Les Bisous)	—	—	—	—	—		Ultra Deluxe
2023	"Unbreakable"	—	—	—	—	—		Ultra Deluxe
2024	"Happy Feeling" (with Russell Small & DNO P)	—	—	—	—	—		Ultra Deluxe
2026	"Give Love" (with Richard Bahericz)	—	—	—	—	—		Non-album single
2026	"Push the Vibe" (with DJ Minx and Dee Diggs)	—	—	—	—	—		LP Giobbi Presents: Femme House Vol. 3
2026	"Movin' to the Sun" (with Hugel and Imael Angel)	—	—	21	42	2	BPI: Silver	Twenty One
2026	"Restless" (with Tedd Patterson)	—	—	—	—	—		Ultra
2026	"Starlight" (with the Avener)	—	—	—	—	—		Non-album single

==== As featured artist ====
Year	Single	Peak chart positions		
Year	Single	US Dance	AUS	UK
1992	"Altitude" (777 featuring Ultra Naté)	44	—	—
1995	"Party Girl (Turn Me Loose)"	6	—	—
1995	"10,000 Screaming Faggots" (The Moonwalkers feat. Ultra Naté)	—	—	—
1997	"Partay Feeling" (B-Crew featuring Barbara Tucker, Dajae, Ultra Naté and Moné)	22	—	45
2004	"Time of Our Lives" (Ultra Devoted)	—	59	—
2005	"Bittersweet Melody" (Gaudino feat. Ultra Naté)	—	—	—
2005	"Wonderful Place" (U.D.A.U.F.L.)	—	—	—
2010	"No Wasted Hearts" (Nicola Fasano feat. Ultra Naté)	—	—	—
2010	"Destination" (Tony Moran feat. Ultra Naté)	10	—	—
2018	"Feeling Mighty" (David Harness, Ultra Naté)	—	—	—
2018	"Peace" (Marcimo x Ultra Naté)	—	—	—
2024	"Every Emotion" (Bright Light Bright Light & Ultra Naté)	—	—	—
2025	"Wrecking Crew" (Lovequest & Ultra Naté)	—	—	—

== See also ==
- List of number-one dance hits (United States)
- List of artists who reached number one on the US Dance chart
