= Blue Notes in the Basement =

Studio album by Ultra Naté
- Released: 1991
- Recorded: 1989–1991
- Genre: Soul; funk; dance pop
- Length: 54:19
- Label: Warner Bros. 26565
- Producer: Basement Boys, Peter Edge, Cynthia Cherry, Bill Coleman

Ultra Naté chronology
Blue Notes in the Basement (1991)	One Woman's Insanity (1993)

Blue Notes in the Basement is the debut album by the American singer-songwriter Ultra Naté. It was released in 1991 on Warner Bros. Records. It includes the singles "It's Over Now", "Scandal," "Deeper Love (Missing You)", "Rejoicing (I'll Never Forget)", and Is It Love?"

== Critical reception ==
Professional ratings
Review scores
Source	Rating
AllMusic	3/5 stars

Simon Dudfield of NME wrote, "Miss Nate has one hell of a voice and this will surely be the deciding factor on whether her smooth jazz tinged soul/funk sticks in a saturated market. The album rolls over pleasantly with enough Soul II Soul type influence to please Kiss FM but too few hooks to captivate the pop market. The single that launched her career, 'It's Over Now' stands out as the pop crossover track and may well be in line for a re-release. A neat sax permeates the whole album, and the production will suit lovers rather than groovers."

== Track listing ==
1. "Blue Notes"
2. "Sands of Time"
3. "Is It Love?"
4. "Deeper Love (Missing You)"
5. "You and Me Together"
6. "It's Over Now"
7. "Scandal"
8. "Rejoicing (I'll Never Forget)"
9. "Rain"
10. "Love Hungover"
11. "It's My World" (feat. Lisa Rasta)
12. "Funny (How Things Change)"
