= Mood II Swing =

- Origin: New York City, United States
- Genre: House- (soulful pop music)
- Years active: 1992–2021
- Labels: Strictly Rhythm (Mercury USA, Virgin UK, Big Life UK)

Mood II Swing was an American house music and all media music production company, consisting of DJ producer John Ciafone and musician, songwriter Lem Springsteen . The production company original intention was to produce music for multi-media platforms. They survived doing remixes from 1993 - 1997 until the co-wrote and produced the global anthem "Free" by Ultra Nate in 1997. After being signed to EMI UK music publishing, without mgmt. both producers decided to disband in 2022 to pursue individual interests. They are most known for soulful house music and JC's hard house dubs. based in New York City.

== Selected discography ==
=== Singles ===
1. "Living In Ecstasy" by: Fonda Rae in 1996 (written & produced by MIIS) 2. "Learn 2 Love" by: Kym English in 1996 (written & produced by MIIS) 3. "Closer" by: Carol Slyvan in 1994 (written & produced by MIIS) 4. "All Night Long" by: MIIS in 1997 (written & Produced by MIIS) 5. "Critical" by: Gerald Lathan in 1997 (written & produced by MIIS) 6. "Helpless" by: Urbanized feat. Silvano in 1992 (first recording with MIIS) 7. "Rushing" by: Loni Clark in 1993 (written & produced by MIIS) 8. "U" by: Loni Clark in 1993 (written & produced by MIIS) 9. "Let The Sunshine" cover by: Gerideau in 1997 10. "Can Get Away" by: Mood II Swing in 2003 (written by Willy Washington & produced by John Ciafone for MIIS productions. 11. "Reach 4 U" feat. Tara J. in 2008 (written & produced by MIIS) 12. "I Got Love" MIIS feat. Lea-Lorien in 2004 (written & produced by MIIS) 13. "Free" by: Ultra Nate in 1997 (Cowritten & produced by MIIS) 14. "Found A Cure" by Ultra Nate in 2000 (Cowritten & produced by MIIS) 15. "Get UP" by: MIIS feat. Dawn Robinson in 2019 (Cowritten & produced by MIIS)- final recording

=== Mood II Swing official remixes ===
- 1996 Nuyorican Soul --------------------------"I Feel It"
- 1995 Janet Jackson ---------------------- "Come On Get Up" (Virgin UK)
- 1996 Lucy Pearl -------------------------- "Don't Mess With My Man" (Virgin UK)
- 1997 BT -------------------- "Remember"
- 1997 Crustation –----------------------------- "Flame" (Mood II Swing Vocal Mix)
- 1997 Smoke City - ------------"Mr. Gorgeous (and Miss Curvaceous)"
- 1996 Everything But The Girl-------------------"Wrong"
- 1996 Leee John --------------------------------"Mighty Power of love"
- 1998 Rachid -----------------------------------"Pride"
- 2010 King Britt presents Sylk130---------------"When The Funk Hits The fan"
- 1998 Steve Silk Hurley & The Voices of life----"The word is love"
- 1999 A:xus featuring Naomi --------------------"Callin U"
- 1999 Indigo feat. Joy Malcolm ------------------"Fly To The Moon"
- 1999 Dina Carroll ------------------------------"Without Love" (Mercury records)
- 1996 Ali ---------------------------------------"Feeling U"
