= Oleta Adams discography =

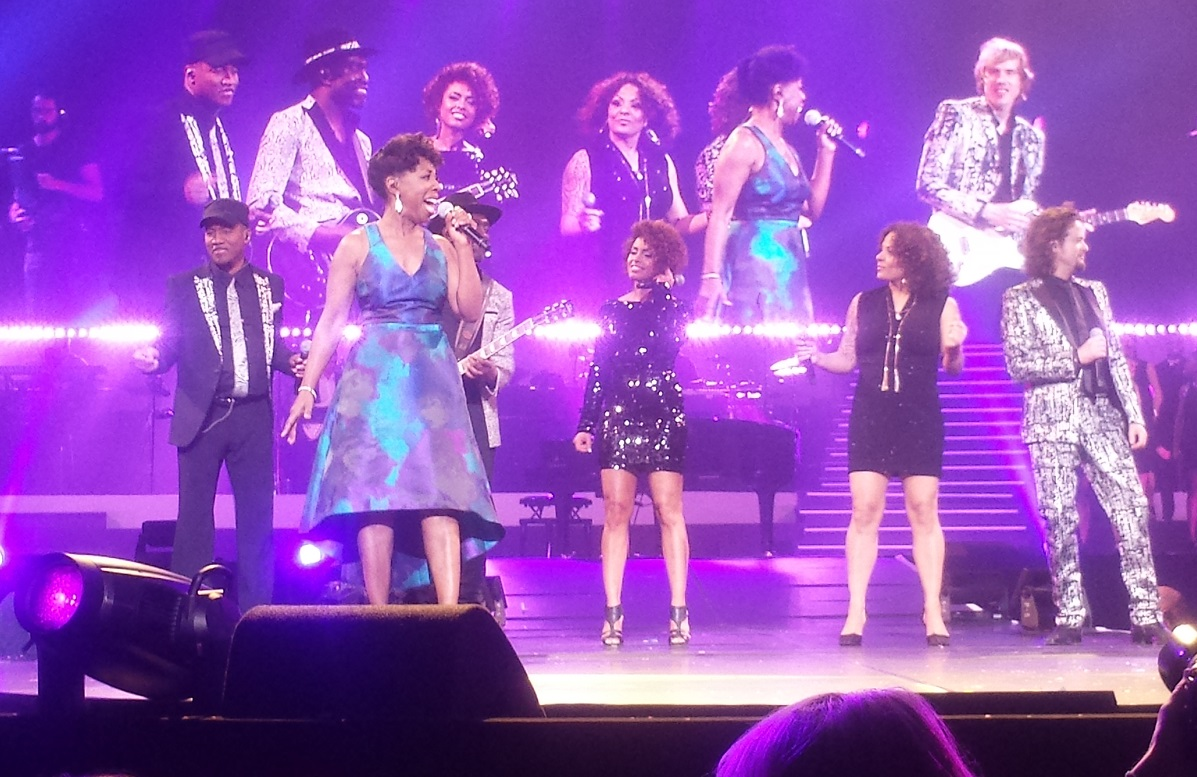
- Adams performing in 2017
- Studio albums: 9
- Compilation albums: 2
- Singles: 19
- Holiday albums: 1

The discography of Oleta Adams, an American singer, consists of seven studio albums, two compilations, a holiday album, and twenty singles.

== Albums ==
=== Studio albums ===
List of studio albums, with selected chart positions, certifications and sales figures
Title	Album details	Peak chart positions							Certifications
Title	Album details	US	US R&B	US Gospel	AUS	GER	NLD	UK	Certifications
Untitled	Released: 1982; Label: Going On SRK; Formats: LP	—	—	—	—	—	—	—	
Going on Record	Released: 1983; Label: Going On SRK; Formats: LP	—	—	—	—	—	—	—	
Circle of One	Released: May 14, 1990; Label: Fontana; Formats: CD	20	11	—	131	—	30	1	UK: Gold; US: Gold
Evolution	Released: July 26, 1993; Label: Fontana; Formats: CD	67	20	—	167	37	6	10	
Moving On	Released: November 10, 1995; Label: Fontana / Mercury; Formats: CD	194	49	—	—	—	14	59	
Come Walk with Me	Released: June 17, 1997; Label: Harmony; Formats: CD	—	—	4	—	—	78	―	
All the Love	Released: February 27, 2001; Label: Monarch / Pioneer; Formats: CD	—	—	—	—	—	22	―	
Christmas Time with Oleta	Released: October 3, 2006; Label: E1 Music; Formats: CD	—	—	—	—	—	26	―	
Let's Stay Here	Released: April 21, 2009; Label: Koch; Formats: CD	—	—	—	—	—	—	—	
Third Set	Released: February 10, 2017; Label: Independent; Formats: CD, digital download	—	—	—	—	—	—	—	
"—" denotes releases that did not chart

=== Compilation albums ===
List of compilation albums, with selected chart positions and certifications
Title	Album details	Peak chart positions
Title	Album details	NLD
The Very Best of Oleta Adams	Released: 1996; Label: Mercury	46
The Ultimate Collection	Released: 2004; Label: Universal	—
"—" denotes releases that did not chart

== Singles ==
=== As main artist ===
List of singles, with selected chart positions and certifications, showing year released and album name
Title	Year	Peak chart positions									Album
Title	Year	US	US R&B	US AC	AUS	CAN	GER	NLD	NZ	UK	Album
"Rhythm of Life"	1990	—	9	21	157	56	—	39	—	52	Circle of One
"Circle of One"	1990	—	—	17	—	—	—	68	—	95	Circle of One
"Rhythm of Life" (re-release)	1990	—	—	—	—	—	—	—	—	56	Circle of One
"Get Here"	1991	5	8	3	151	26	80	28	43	4	Circle of One
"You've Got to Give Me Room"	1991	—	—	—	—	—	—	—	—	49	Circle of One
"Circle of One" (re-release)	1991	—	27	37	—	70	—	—	—	73	Circle of One
"Don't Let the Sun Go Down on Me"	1991	—	—	—	107	—	—	32	—	33	Two Rooms: Celebrating the Songs of Elton John & Bernie Taupin
"I Just Had to Hear Your Voice"	1993	—	97	—	182	—	—	28	—	42	Evolution
"Window of Hope"	1993	—	—	—	—	—	51	13	—	76	Evolution
"Easier to Say (Goodbye)"	1994	—	—	—	—	—	—	—	—	—	Evolution
"My Heart Won't Lie"	1994	—	—	—	—	—	—	—	—	—	Evolution
"We Will Find a Way" (with Brenda Russell)	1994	—	—	—	—	—	—	—	—	—	Corrina, Corrina OST
"Never Knew Love"	1995	—	60	—	—	—	—	16	—	22	Moving On
"Rhythm of Life" (remix)	1995	—	—	—	—	—	—	—	—	38	Non-album single
"Life Keeps Moving On"	1995	—	—	—	—	—	—	—	—	—	Moving On
"We Will Meet Again"	1996	—	—	—	—	—	—	—	—	51	Moving On
"When You Walked into My Life"	2001	—	—	—	—	—	—	90	—	—	All the Love
"I Can't Live a Day Without You"	2002	—	—	—	—	—	—	—	—	—	All the Love
"Long and Lonely Hours"	2015	—	—	—	—	—	—	—	—	—	Non-album singles
"Safe and Sound"	2015	—	—	—	—	—	—	—	—	—	Non-album singles
"Place of Peace"	2020	—	—	—	—	—	—	—	—	—	Non-album singles
"—" denotes releases that did not chart

=== As featured artist ===
List of singles, with selected chart positions, showing year released
Title	Year	Peak chart positions										Album
Title	Year	US	AUS	CAN	FRA	GER	IRE	ITA	NL	NZ	UK	Album
"Woman in Chains" (Tears for Fears featuring Oleta Adams)	1989	36	39	11	20	45	21	23	16	34	26	The Seeds of Love
"Woman in Chains" (re-release) (Tears for Fears featuring Oleta Adams)	1992	—	—	—	—	—	—	—	—	—	57	Greatest Hits 82–92

== Other appearances ==
Title	Year	Album	Artist(s)	Note(s)
"Badman's Song"	1989	The Seeds of Love	Tears for Fears	In addition to "Woman in Chains", Adams performed vocals and/or piano on these album tracks.
"Standing on the Corner of the Third World"	1989	The Seeds of Love	Tears for Fears	In addition to "Woman in Chains", Adams performed vocals and/or piano on these album tracks.
"Hey Babe"	1989	Count on Me	David Basse	
"Eyes of a Desperado"	1989	Count on Me	David Basse	
"25th Story Blues"	1989	Count on Me	David Basse	
"Yellow Cab"	1989	Count on Me	David Basse	
"Song for You"	1989	Count on Me	David Basse	
"Count on Me"	1989	Count on Me	David Basse	
"I Believe"	1990	Going to California	Tears for Fears	Adams performed this song as a lead vocalist/pianist.
"Woman in Chains"	1990	Going to California	Tears for Fears	Duets with Tears for Fears
"Badman's Song"	1990	Going to California	Tears for Fears	Duets with Tears for Fears
"Famous Last Words"	1990	Going to California	Tears for Fears	Adams participated in these songs as a background vocalist and a pianist.
"Standing on the Corner of the Third World"	1990	Going to California	Tears for Fears	Adams participated in these songs as a background vocalist and a pianist.
"Sowing the Seeds of Love/All You Need Is Love"	1990	Going to California	Tears for Fears	Adams participated in these songs as a background vocalist and a pianist.
"Everybody Wants to Rule the World"	1990	Going to California	Tears for Fears	Adams participated in these songs as a background vocalist and a pianist.
"The Year of the Knife"	1990	Going to California	Tears for Fears	Adams participated in these songs as a background vocalist and a pianist.
"Shout"	1990	Going to California	Tears for Fears	Adams participated in these songs as a background vocalist and a pianist.
"Me and My Big Ideas"	1995	Raoul and the Kings of Spain	Tears for Fears	Duet with Tears for Fears
"Nobody Does It Better"	1995	Pearls	David Sanborn	
"Mama's Not Coming Home"	1996	Experience	Definition of Sound	Adams participated in these songs as a background vocalist.
"From This Moment On"	1998	Steel City Swingin’	Phil Collins Big Band	
"Interlude"	1998	Steel City Swingin’	Phil Collins Big Band	Track 21 of the album.
"Two Lovers as Friends"	1998	Steel City Swingin’	Phil Collins Big Band	
"Interlude"	1998	Steel City Swingin’	Phil Collins Big Band	Track 23 of the album.
"I Got a Right to Sing the Blues"	1998	Steel City Swingin’	Phil Collins Big Band	
"I Won't Be Happy"	1998	Steel City Swingin’	Phil Collins Big Band	
"Interlude"	1998	Steel City Swingin’	Phil Collins Big Band	Track 26 of the album.
"New York State of Mind"	1998	Steel City Swingin’	Phil Collins Big Band	
"Watch What Happens"	1998	Steel City Swingin’	Phil Collins Big Band	
"Moon River"	2001	Modern Mancini	The Crown Project	Adams participated in this song as a lead vocalist.
"Starting All Over Again"	2003	Shirley Caesar and Friends	Shirley Caesar	Adams participated in these songs as a background vocalist.
"I Believe (A Soulful Re-Recording)"	2009	Live from Santa Barbara	Tears for Fears	Re-issue of the 1990 Tears for Fears live concert Going to California
"I've Got to Sing My Song"	2009	Live from Santa Barbara	Tears for Fears	Re-issue of the 1990 Tears for Fears live concert Going to California

== Other recorded songs ==
Title	Year	Album	Note(s)
"O Come All Ye Faithful"	1994	Joyful Christmas	
"Oh Me, Oh My (I'm a Fool for You Baby)"	1994	"My Heart Won't Lie" (CD single)	
"Let Me Be the One"	1994	"My Heart Won't Lie" (CD single)	
"I Believe You"	1994	"My Heart Won't Lie" (CD single)	
"We Will Find a Way"	1994	Corrina, Corrina OST	A duet with Brenda Russell.
"Many Rivers to Cross"	1994	Jason's Lyric OST	
"The Captain of My Ship"	1995	A Tribute to Mrs. Rosa Parks	This version of the song is different from the one on Adams' album Come Walk with Me.
"The Power of Peace"	1996	The Power of Peace	This song features various artists.
"Let It Be"	1996	Heineken: Night of the Proms 1996	This song features Adams, Joe Cocker, Tony Hadley, Dani Klein, and Guo Yue.
"Waters of March"	1997	A Twist of Jobim	
"Girl from Ipanema"	1997	A Twist of Jobim	
"Big Girls Never Cry" / "Mix Max Song" / "Hand in Hand" / "Marry Him-Mix Max"	1997		Adams, Zucchero, B.B. King and James Ingram participated in as voice actors and on the English version of the European animated film Die furchtlosen Vier ("The Fearless Four") based on the fairy tale "The Musicians of Bremen".; Adams participated in these songs as a lead vocalist.
"The Christmas Song (Chestnuts Roasting on an Open Fire)"	1998	The Colors of Christmas	
"A Child Was Born into My Life"	1998	Christmas Harmony	
"Colors of the Heart"	1999	Bridges: Songs of Unity and Purpose	A duet with Jaci Velasquez.
"Let Me Be the One"	2000	Divas Simply Singing	This version of the song is different from the one on Adams' CD single "My Heart Won't Lie".
"Colors of the Heart"	2001	"When You Walked into My Life" (CD single)	This is a solo version.
"In a Sentimental Mood"	2003	Big Band Romance	
"Goodbye Yesterday"	2003	Miki Imai Songbook: Take Me to the Sunshine	David Garfield Group featuring Oleta Adams.
"The Last Lie"	2003	Over the Sky: Yuming International Cover Album	

== Videography ==
=== Video albums ===
Title	Video details
Tears for Fears – Going to California	Released: 1990; Label: Polygram; Formats: VHS, Laserdisc; Released on DVD in 2005 as part of Scenes from the Big Chair.
Oleta Adams – Live in Concert	Released: 2005

== Music videos ==
Title	Year	Director(s)
"Rhythm of Life"	1990	
"Circle of One"	1990	
"Get Here"	1991	Greg Gold
"Don't Let the Sun Go Down on Me"	1991	
"I Just Had to Hear Your Voice"	1993	Randee St. Nicholas
"Window of Hope"	1993	Leta Warner
"Never Knew"	1996	Dick Buckley
