= The Ultimate Collection (Oleta Adams album) =

Compilation album by Oleta Adams
- Released: 2004
- Genre: R&B, soul, adult contemporary, gospel
- Label: USM

Oleta Adams chronology
| All The Love (2001) | The Ultimate Collection (2004) | Christmas Time with Oleta (2006) |

The Ultimate Collection is a compilation album by the American vocalist, pianist and songwriter Oleta Adams, released in 2004.

== Track listing ==
Disc 1

1. "Rhythm Of Life" - 4:18
2. "Circle Of One" - 3:52
3. "Get Here" - 4:35
4. "I've Got To Sing My Song" - 4:02
5. "You've Got To Give Me Room" - 5:15
6. "Don't Let The Sun Go Down On Me" - 5:54
7. "I Just Had To Hear Your Voice" - 3:39
8. "Hold Me For A While" - 5:09
9. "The Day I Stop Loving You" - 5:02
10. "My Heart Won't Lie" - 4:41
11. "When Love Comes To The Rescue" - 5:14
12. "Window Of Hope" - 4:21
13. "Oh Me, Oh My (I'm A Fool For You Baby)" - 4:40
14. "I Believe You" - 4:14

Disc 2

1. "Blessed With You" - 3:25
2. "No Secrets" - 4:08
3. "You Won't Get Away" - 5:56
4. "Never Knew Love" - 3:21
5. "I Knew You When" - 4:19
6. "We Will Meet Again" - 4:46
7. "New Star" - 4:17
8. "Once In A Lifetime" - 5:21
9. "You Need To Be Loved" - 4:39
10. "Between Hello And Goodbye" - 6:11
11. "Come And Walk With Me" - 6:07
12. "I Will Love You" - 5:30
13. "When You Walked Into My Life" - 4:16
14. "Learning To Love You More" - 4:25

Disc 3

1. "Woman In Chains" (featuring Tears For Fears) - 6:30
2. "Bad Man's Song" (featuring Tears For Fears) - 8:33
3. "I've Got To Sing My Song (Live)" - 4:32
4. "Get Here (Live)" - 4:54
5. "Slow Motion (Live)" - 4:20
6. "Life Keeps Moving On (Live)" - 4:35
7. "Rhythm Of Life (Reverend Jefferson's Original Dance Hall Mix)" - 6:48
8. "Never Knew Love (Reverend Jefferson Mix)" - 7:12
