= European Soundmix Show =

- Created by: Joop van den Ende
- Presented by: Linda de Mol (1996, 1999); Linda Evans (1997); Bobbie Eakes and Jeff Trachta (1998); Matthew Kelly (2001–2002)
- Country of origin: Netherlands

Production
- Producers: Endemol Entertainment (1996–1999); ITV Productions (2001–2002)

Original release
- Release: 1996 – 2002

The European Soundmix Show was an imitation talent competition held yearly from 1996 to 1999, with two special shows in 2001 and 2002.

The show was an international version of Dutch television show Soundmixshow.

Various European countries competed with one participant each imitating a famous artist, and most often, the participant was the winner of the national competition the same or the previous year. Some participants were, however, chosen internally by the national television company, without any pre-selection.

The winner was chosen by a jury vote. Every country sent two jury members (except for 1996 when it was only one member), which together awarded their top-4 countries 5, 3, 2 and 1 point(s).

== Participation ==
Listed are all the countries that have taken part in the competition, alongside the year in which they made their debut:

Year	Debuting countries
1996	Belgium, Denmark, Germany, Italy, Netherlands; Norway, Portugal, Spain, Sweden, United Kingdom
1998	Hungary, Poland
2002	Ireland

== Winners ==
Year	Date	Winner	Performer	Imitated Artist
1996	27 April	Germany	Bianca Shomburg	Celine Dion
1997	19 April	Netherlands	Edsilia Rombley	Oleta Adams
1998	25 April	Portugal	Carlos Bruno	Michael Stipe (REM)
1999	22 May	Netherlands	Cherwin Muringen	Seal
2001	14 April	Belgium	Sonny O' Brien	Celine Dion
2002	2 November	Ireland	Rebecca O'Connor	Tina Turner

== Competitions ==
=== 1996 ===
The first European Soundmix Show was held in Amsterdam, the Netherlands on 27 April 1996. It was produced by Endemol and the host of the show was Linda de Mol.

Pos	Country	Performer	Imitated artist	Points
1	Germany	Bianca Shomburg	Celine Dion	21
2	Portugal	Rui Faria Santos	Elton John	18
2	Norway	Christina Undhjem	Whitney Houston	18
4	Netherlands	Arno Kolenbrander	Simon Bowman	13
5	Spain	Silvia, Laura & Patricia Ugarte	The Andrews Sisters	12
6	Denmark	Gry Trampedach	Sanne Salomonsen	10
7	Italy	Walter Lamberti, Tony Ingui, Tony Buongrazio, Valentino Brandi, Giuseppe Galizia	Take That	8
8	Sweden	Henrik Åberg	Elvis Presley	4
9	Belgium	Marianne van Eynde	Tina Turner	3
10	United Kingdom	Terry Nash	Meat Loaf	2

=== 1997 ===
The second European Soundmix Show was held in Amsterdam, the Netherlands on 19 April 1997. It was produced by Endemol and the host of the show was Linda Evans.

Pos	Country	Performer	Imitated artist	Points
1	Netherlands	Edsilia Rombley	Oleta Adams	22
2	Spain	Xavier Garriga	Ray Charles	17
3	Norway	Kjell Inge Torgersen	Sting	15
4	Belgium	Jaan de Köninnck	Guns N' Roses	10
5	Sweden	Robert Randquist	Julio Iglesias	9
6	Germany	Tammy Eckhart	Alanis Morissette	6
6	Portugal	Jessi Leal	Kate Bush	6
8	Denmark	Claus Nielsen	John Lennon	3

=== 1998 ===
The third European Soundmix Show was held in Amsterdam, the Netherlands on 25 April 1998. It was produced by Endemol and the hosts of the show were Bobbie Eakes and Jeff Trachta.

Pos	Country	Performer	Imitated artist	Points
1	Portugal	Carlos Bruno	Michael Stipe (REM)	22
2	Poland	Magdalena Piwowarczyk	Sinéad O'Connor	20
3	Norway	Toril Moe	Celine Dion	11
4	Netherlands	Mary Ann Morales	Lea Salonga	10
5	Sweden	Cecilia Karlsson	Dolly Parton	8
5	Germany	Kirstin Hesse	Madonna	8
7	Spain	José Luis Enguane	Louis Armstrong	7
8	Hungary	Timia Kasai	The Cranberries	2

=== 1999 ===
The fourth European Soundmix Show was held in Amsterdam, the Netherlands on 22 May 1999. It was produced by Endemol and the host of the show was Linda de Mol.

Pos	Country	Performer	Imitated artist	Points
1	Netherlands	Cherwin Muringen	Seal	?
2	Belgium	C-Stone & Roeland Vandersloten	Bono	?
?	Germany	Mia Aegerter	Natalie Imbruglia	?
?	Norway	Helene Silvia Moen	Sarah Brightman	?
3	Poland	Marcin Szaniawski	Jamiroquai	?
?	Portugal	Ricardo Sousa & Sandra Godinho	Meat Loaf	?
?	Spain	Lluis Masclans	George Michael	?

=== 2001 ===
The fifth European Soundmix Show was held in Manchester, the United Kingdom on 14 April 2001. The show was called Stars in Euro Eyes 2001, and was made mainly for the British television audience. It was produced by ITV Productions, and the presenter was Matthew Kelly.

Pos	Country	Performer	Imitated artist	Points
1	Belgium	Sonny Oroir	Celine Dion	70
2	Netherlands	Sylvana Djoemat	Patti LaBelle	56
2	United Kingdom	Gary Mullen	Freddie Mercury	56
4	Portugal	Nádia Sousa	Edith Piaf	36
5	Norway	Benedikte Narum	Joni Mitchell	32
6	Sweden	Katja Nord and Camilla Löwenberg	ABBA	18
7	Germany	Marco Neumann	Marti Pellow	16
8	Hungary	Péter Kovács	Tom Jones	6
8	Italy	Matteo Tarolla	Ricky Martin	6
10	Spain	Ivonne, Patricia and Carol Ballinas	The Supremes	4

=== 2002 ===
The sixth European Soundmix Show was held in Manchester, the United Kingdom on 26 October and 2 November 2002. The show was called Stars in Their Eyes European Championships 2002, and was made mainly for the British television audience. It was produced by ITV Productions, and the host was Matthew Kelly.

Pos	Country	Performer	Imitated artist	Points
1	Ireland	Rebecca O'Connor	Tina Turner	89
2	Italy	Walter, Davide and Pasquale Egiziano	Bee Gees	81
3	Spain	Connie Lynch	Bonnie Tyler	80
3	Belgium	Fernando Espeso Calvo	Julio Iglesias	80
5	Netherlands	Shanella James	Mary J. Blige	78
6	United Kingdom	Stewart Duff	Elvis Presley	73
7	Sweden	Mirna Tutnjevic	Britney Spears	63
8	Norway	Ronny Inderberg	Garth Brooks	61
9	Germany	Michael Bormann	Bon Jovi	58
10	Portugal	Yolanda	Shania Twain	51

== See also ==
- Stars in Their Eyes
