= European Soundmix Show 1997 =

Show broadcast in Europe

Date and venue
- Final: 19 April 1997
- Venue: Endemol Studios, Amsterdam, Netherlands

Organisation
- Host broadcaster: (Netherlands) Endemol
- Presenters: Linda Evans

Participants
- Number of entries: 8
- Debuting countries: None
- Returning countries: None
- Non-returning countries: Italy; United Kingdom

Vote
- Voting system: Each country had 2 jury members who awarded the top 4 countries 1, 2, 3 and 5 points.

The European Soundmix Show 1997 was the second European Soundmix Show.

Like the first contest, this one was held in Amsterdam, and the host country the Netherlands won the show with Edsilia Rombley imitating Oleta Adams.

== Results ==
| Draw | Country | Contestant | Imitated artist | Performing the song | Place | Points |
|---|---|---|---|---|---|---|
| 1 | Norway | Kjell Inge Torgersen | Sting | Englishman in New York | 3 | 15 |
| 2 | Spain | Xavier Garriga | Ray Charles | Georgia on My Mind | 2 | 17 |
| 3 | Germany | Tami Eckhart | Alanis Morissette | Ironic | 6 | 6 |
| 4 | Denmark | Claus Nielsen | John Lennon | Imagine | 8 | 3 |
| 5 | Belgium | Jan Dekeuninck | Guns N' Roses | November Rain | 4 | 10 |
| 6 | Netherlands | Edsilia Rombley | Oleta Adams | I Just Had to Hear Your Voice | 1 | 22 |
| 7 | Portugal | Jessi Leal | Kate Bush | Wuthering Heights | 6 | 6 |
| 8 | Sweden | Robert Randquist | Julio Iglesias | Pobre diablo | 5 | 9 |
