= The Very Best of Oleta Adams =

Album by Oleta Adams

Greatest hits album by Oleta Adams
- Released: November 25, 1996
- Genre: R&B, soul
- Label: Fontana

Oleta Adams chronology
Moving On (1995)	The Very Best of Oleta Adams (1996)	Come Walk with Me (1997)

Alternative cover
- 1998 US cover

Professional ratings
Review scores
Source	Rating
Allmusic	4/5 stars

The Very Best of Oleta Adams is a compilation album by American vocalist, pianist, and songwriter Oleta Adams and was released in 1996.

== History ==
Released at the end of 1996 in Europe, this album served to finish Adams' contract with Mercury Records. It includes singles and album highlights of her albums Circle of One, Evolution and Moving On. Also included is Adams' very first single release, the duet with Tears for Fears "Woman in Chains", as well as her 1991 cover of "Don't Let The Sun Go Down On Me" for the Two Rooms album, neither of which had been included on her albums.

== USA version ==
This first edition of the compilation was never released in the USA. Instead, Mercury Records released a compilation with the same title two years later, in 1998, with a slightly different track listing. It included two rare 1994 non-album songs: the cover of "Embraceable You" recorded for a George Gershwin tribute album, and the cover of the song "Many Rivers to Cross", recorded for the soundtrack of the film Jason's Lyric.

== Track listing ==
European 1996 CD

1. "Rhythm Of Life" - 4:22
2. "Get Here" - 4:34
3. "Window Of Hope" - 4:22
4. "I've Got To Sing My Song" - 4:04
5. "Don't Let The Sun Go Down On Me" - 5:55
6. "Never Knew Love" - 3:23
7. "We Will Meet Again" - 4:46
8. "Hold Me For A While" - 5:11
9. "Circle Of One" - 3:53
10. "When Love Comes To The Rescue" - 5:15
11. "I Knew You When" - 4:20
12. "Lover's Holiday" - 4:12
13. "I Just Had To Hear Your Voice" - 3:43
14. "My Heart Won't Lie" - 4:44
15. "Woman In Chains" (with Tears For Fears) - 6:31
16. "Life Keeps Moving On" - 5:31

USA 1998 CD

1. "Rhythm Of Life" (Nicola Holland; Roland Orzabal) - 4:19
2. "Don't Let The Sun Go Down On Me" (Elton John; Bernie Taupin) - 5:54
3. "Never Knew Love" (Oleta Adams; Vassal Benford; Kathy Wakefield) - 3:21
4. "Get Here" (Brenda Russell) - 4:35
5. "Hold Me For A While" (Oleta Adams) - 5:10
6. "Many Rivers To Cross" (Jimmy Cliff) - 4:05
7. "Circle Of One" (Oleta Adams) - 3:52
8. "My Heart Won't Lie" (Oleta Adams) - 4:42
9. "Lover's Holiday" (Oleta Adams) - 4:10
10. "Embraceable You" (George Gershwin; Ira Gershwin) - 3:52
11. "We Will Meet Again" (Brenda Russell; Allan Rich) - 4:46
12. "Love Begins At Home" (Oleta Adams; Jud Friedman; Allan Rich) - 4:51
13. "I Just Had To Hear Your Voice" (Jud Friedman; Allan Rich) - 3:38
14. "Woman In Chains" (with Tears For Fears) (Roland Orzabal) - 6:29
15. "I Knew You When" (Donny Kees; Shawna Harrington-Burkhart) - 4:20
16. "Window Of Hope" (Oleta Adams) - 4:24

== Charts ==
Chart (1996)	Position
Dutch album chart	#46
