= The Society of M.I.C.E. =

Society of MICE
- Founded: 1961
- Location: Kingston upon Hull, United Kingdom
- Region served: Kingston upon Hull, United Kingdom
- Product: Fundraising
- Method: Entertainment

The Society of M.I.C.E. is a charitable organisation based in Kingston upon Hull. It was founded in 1961, by a group of dedicated entertainers working on an idea proposed by Al Gillyon. The society is modelled on the Grand Order of Water Rats. Its membership is exclusively of men, although the members wives, partners and friends often help out in varying capacities. MICE is an acronym for "Men in Charitable Endeavour".

== The beginning ==
In 1960, Al Gillyon proposed the setting up of an organisation in Kingston upon Hull similar to the Grand Order of Water Rats. The idea was talked about in clubs, at shows, even in people's front rooms after a show. Al Gillyon approached the comic Harry Hemmingway and both approved of the idea and, in Gillyon's words, 'the Society of M.I.C.E was born'. Two meetings took place at Gillyon's home, during which nine other entertainers were brought on board - it had been agreed that each member would nominate another entertainer to join the society. After deciding that his 'cocktail cabinet had taken enough punishment', the first official meeting of twenty four members took place at the Windmill Hotel, Witham, Kingston upon Hull on 13 February 1961. Gillyon presented a constitution, officers were elected, and it was agreed that the aims of the group, Fellowship, Benevolence and Charity should be paramount.

=== The Offices of the Society ===
The Society has the usual committee structure, with a President and Vice-president elected annually, chosen singly by the outgoing President and announced at the annual dinner, which is held in mid February. There are also positions for chairman, Secretary, Treasurer and the Steward to the Elders. The only difference is the title of these positions, all of which are extremely fitting:-

- President = KING MOUSE
- Vice-President = PRINCE MOUSE
- Chairman = TRAP GUARD
- Secretary = SCRIBE MOUSE
- Treasurer = KEEPER OF THE CHEESE
- Steward to the Elders = PILOT MOUSE

There are other positions within the society, including the CONCERT MOUSE, who organises the concerts.

=== Founder Members ===
The following:

- Al Gillyon
- Harry Hemingway
- Dennis Hunter
- Terry Matsell
- Jimmy Welsh
- Jack Wilkinson
- Brian Winchester

are considered to be the founder members of the society as they were either present at the first meeting of the society, or offered their apologies for absence. From these members, the first KING MOUSE was Al Gillyon, the first PRINCE MOUSE was Jack Wilkinson, the first SCRIBE MOUSE was Terry Matsell, and the first TRAP GUARD was Jimmy Welsh, who at the time was also the Vice-Chairman of the Variety Artists Association. Al Gillyon and Clive Hunter wrote the Anthem.

== Today ==
The Society is currently made up of Singers & Entertainers, mainly from the Kingston upon Hull area, along with many other members who perform equally as important roles behind the scenes. Members of the 'Old Flames' (Retired members of Humberside Fire and Rescue Service) have also joined the society" and Stars in Their Eyes" champion Ian Moor is a member and former holder of the office of Prince Mouse.

The Society's aim is to raise funds for local good causes and charities, by means of live concert shows and other fund raising events. The society holds tombola & raffle stalls at various outdoor events throughout the summer and concerts are usually twice monthly in and around the Kingston upon Hull area. Venues vary from clubs to residential homes. It holds meetings every fortnight, to discuss future concerts and other matters regarding fund raising for the community. The meeting venue has changed several times over the years, and is referred to by members as the MOUSE HOLE.

The MICE Singers

The 2022 king is King PJ and Prince Mark Kelly (Hogben) is his assistant for the current year.

=== The MICE Singers ===
In 1996, the society added an extra act to the concerts, in the form of a choir, made up of several of the society's members. Initially called "The Bolder Boys", named after Harry Bolder, who conducted the choir in its early years and whose idea it was to form the choir, today it is known as "The MICE Singers". As well as regular appearances at the society's concerts, they perform at many other venues, and are now in great demand throughout the year, with appearances at weddings, residential homes, harvest festivals, schools, and other events.

=== Anthem ===
The Society has an anthem, with lyrics written by one of the founder members, Clive Hunter, who adapted the words to the tune of Three Blind Mice. The anthem is sung at all concerts, and at the annual dinner by all the members present.

=== The King's Special Project ===
Each year the elected King Mouse nominates a charity or organisation to be the prime beneficiary of the years fundraising efforts and specific concerts and events are chosen to raise funds solely for this purpose. A cheque for the grand total raised is then presented to a representative from the charity or organisation at the annual "Special Presentation Evening", which is held at the end of January, shortly before the annual dinner.
