= Third Set =

Third Set may refer to:

- Third Set (Cedar Walton album)
- Third Set (Oleta Adams album)
