= Never Knew Love (Oleta Adams song) =

1995 single by Oleta Adams

Single by Oleta Adams

from the album Moving On
- Released: September 25, 1995
- Genre: R&B; electro-pop (remix); house (remix)
- Length: 3:32
- Label: Fontana
- Songwriter(s): Kathy Wakefield; Oleta Adams; Vassal Benford
- Producer(s): Vassal Benford

Oleta Adams singles chronology
"We Will Find a Way" (1994)	"Never Knew Love" (1995)	"Rhythm of Life (Remix)" (1995)

Music video
- Listen to "Never Knew Love" on YouTube

"Never Knew Love" is a song by American singer-songwriter Oleta Adams, released in September 1995 by Fontana Records as the lead single from her fifth album, Moving On (1995). It was co-written by Adams' with Kathy Wakefield and producer Vassal Benford, and became Adams' fourth top-40 single in the United Kingdom, peaking at number 22. The single charted higher in the Netherlands, where it reached number 16. Multiple remixes have been released of the track.

== Critical reception ==
Larry Flick from Billboard magazine described the album version as a "funky li'l midtempo R&B jam." He added, "Underlined with plush old-school charm, this track has considerable youth appeal. Adams has rarely sounded so playful. [...] In all, a solid single designed to expand Adams' already sizable audience." Flick also noted that remixers Danny Tenaglia and Satoshi Tomiie transform the song into "a shimmering house anthem". James Masterton for Dotmusic complimented it as a "powerful track". Pan-European magazine Music & Media wrote about the remix, "Known as a rather MOR singer, Adams now confidently nods into a NY club house sound and shamelessly takes a seat between Robin S and the Nightcrawlers. Hot stuff!"

In another review, Music & Media added, "With an intro reminiscent of Crystal Waters' 'Gypsy Woman', Adams shines in a upbeat and happy electro-pop single." Alan Jones from Music Week felt the singer "bounces back with her best single in a while", with "a delightful celebration, whose infectious style is wholly appropriate to its upbeat lyrics. Dance mixes take it higher still and the whole exercise makes for happy anticipation of her forthcoming album Moving On." James Hamilton from the Record Mirror Dance Update described it as a "gorgeous catchily cooed and moaned soulful gentle sure-fire smash" in his weekly dance column.

== Track listings ==
- 12-inch, UK (1995)
1. "Never Knew Love" (DT's Mercury mix) – 8:40
2. "Never Knew Love" (You Gave Me dub) – 8:19
3. "Never Knew Love" (DT's radio edit) – 4:05
4. "Never Knew Love" (The Press remix) – 3:50
5. "Never Knew Love" (Reverend Jefferson mix) – 7:10
6. "Never Knew Love" (Nu Soul mix) – 6:57
- CD single, Europe (1995)
1. "Never Knew Love" (Reverend Jefferson edit) – 4:06
2. "Never Knew Love" – 3:22
- CD single, UK and Europe (1995)
1. "Never Knew Love" – 3:20
2. "No Secrets" – 4:08
3. "Blessed with You" – 3:24
4. "Get Here" – 4:34

== Charts ==
Chart (1995–1996)	Peak position
Netherlands (Dutch Top 40)	18
Netherlands (Single Top 100)	16
Scotland (OCC)	31
UK Singles (OCC)	22
US Hot R&B Airplay (Billboard)	60

== Release history ==
Region	Date	Format(s)	Label(s)	Ref.
United Kingdom	September 25, 1995	12-inch vinyl; CD; cassette	Fontana	
United States	1996	Radio	Fontana	
