= Stars in Their Eyes =

British television talent series

- Genre: Talent show
- Created by: Joop van den Ende
- Based on: Soundmixshow
- Presented by: Leslie Crowther (1990–1992); Russ Abbot (1993 Elvis special); Matthew Kelly (1993–2004); Davina McCall (2003 specials); Cat Deeley (2003–2006); Harry Hill (2015)
- Voices of: Andrew Brittain; Peter Dickson; Sally Lindsay
- Country of origin: United Kingdom
- Original language: English
- No. of series: 17
- No. of episodes: 209 (list of episodes)

Production
- Running time: 30 minutes (1990–1993); 45 minutes (1994–2006); 65 minutes (2015)
- Production companies: Granada in association with J. E. Entertainment and Action Time (1990–2004); Granada Productions/ITV Productions (2004–2006); Initial (2015)

Original release
- Network: ITV
- Release: 21 July 1990 – 23 December 2006
- Release: 10 January – 14 February 2015

Related
- Starstruck (2022–2023); Stars in Their Eyes: Kids

Stars in Their Eyes is a British television talent series, based on Dutch talent show Soundmixshow. It featured a singing contest in which members of the public impersonate showbiz stars.

The show premiered on 21 July 1990 and initially ran until 23 December 2006. It was produced by Granada for ITV and originally presented by Leslie Crowther. Matthew Kelly took over in May 1993, before he was replaced by Cat Deeley in April 2004. An Elvis Presley special hosted by Russ Abbot aired in January 1993, as well as 2003 specials hosted by Davina McCall. A number of celebrity specials and a children's spin-off series were also aired during the original run.

A six-part revival hosted by Harry Hill aired from 10 January 2015 to 14 February 2015, but it was later axed by ITV due to low ratings and poor reviews. In 2022, ITV aired Starstruck, a similar format which was described by some media outlets as a revived and reformatted version of Stars in Their Eyes.

== History ==
A series of non-televised pilots were filmed in 1989 hosted by Chris Tarrant. However, in February 1990, Leslie Crowther was chosen as the host of the show which began airing on 21 July 1990. Crowther hosted the first three series, and a Christmas Special in 1991. At the time of his car accident in October 1992, he was booked to record an Elvis Presley special (which was later hosted by Russ Abbot) and a fourth series (later hosted by Matthew Kelly) in 1993.

It then became clear that Crowther would not be able to return. He announced his retirement from showbusiness in November 1994 and died two years later. Therefore, Kelly hosted the show until the live grand final of the 15th series on 13 March 2004. Kelly announced a few days earlier that he would quit the show in order to pursue his acting career full-time. Kelly also hosted the 2001 pilot episode, and first series of the kids version in 2002.

In January 2003, Kelly was arrested by police over allegations of child sex abuse resulting in Davina McCall temporarily guest hosting the show for three celebrity specials that were broadcast the following month. Kelly returned after the charges were dropped.

Cat Deeley, who previously took over as host of the kids' version in 2003, was Kelly's replacement for the final adult series in 2005. Deeley also hosted several celebrity specials in 2004. In June 2006, ITV denied reports that the series was facing the axe although admitted that the future of the show was being discussed. Deeley hosted the show until its final episode in December 2006; the show was then axed by ITV.

The most impersonated stars are Dolly Parton, Elvis Presley, Cher, George Michael, Celine Dion, Kylie Minogue and Madonna.

=== 2015 revival ===
Harry Hill took over as host on 10 January 2015, with all episodes pre-recorded and the winner of each show again voted for by the studio audience.

The revival proved divisive – fans of the original format were critical of it, saying that Harry Hill had made the show about him rather than the contestants; while others acknowledged that the revival was a post-modern parody of the original, with its knowing ridicule of talent show cliches such as terrible performances being overpraised, and the actions of the presenter receiving high editorial focus to distract from the outdated performance element being thinly stretched. Each episode features Harry being pursued by Adele (really a look-alike) for being in possession of her baby and she would comically chase him until she got the baby back.

In April 2015, it was announced that due to poor viewing figures, ITV would not be renewing the show for another series, and it was axed.

== Format ==
Stars in Their Eyes is a talent show where contestants get the chance to appear and sing live as a famous singer. The show is most importantly a 'soundalike' show, but they are also dressed up to look as close as possible to the singer they are impersonating, often with wigs and heavy makeup. Each contestant would walk through 'smokey' doors before instantly reappearing dressed up as their chosen star.

=== Heats ===
The contestants appear firstly as themselves, talking briefly with the host about their lives and giving clues as to who they are going to be performing as, finishing with the catchphrase, 'Tonight [presenter name] I'm/We're going to be...' The contestants then disappear through doors and reappear as the famous singer/singers they are to impersonate immediately after.

At the end of the show, the studio audience vote for their favourite, and the winner is announced. The winners from each show in the series return for the grand final to perform once more.

=== Grand Final ===
==== 1990–1992, 2015 ====
In the original Leslie Crowther version and the 2015 revival, the grand finals were pre-recorded, and the winner of the whole series was voted for by the studio audience at the end of the show. The first series final in 1990 also had a celebrity panel, consisting of Joe Longthorne, Sally Dynevor and Pete Waterman, who gave their opinions after each performance.

==== 1993–2006 ====
When Matthew Kelly took over, the grand finals were broadcast live, and the winner of the whole series was voted for by the viewing public through the phone lines and in later years, online and text message as well. For each performance, the finalists were accompanied by a live studio orchestra. The winner was announced later that same evening in a separate broadcast.

The same process applied during Cat Deeley's tenure as host. In the kids version, from series two onwards, an additional finalist is chosen from the remaining contestants in a public vote with voting lines opening after each heat is broadcast. The contestant with the most votes is revealed during the grand final. This also applied to the 2005 adult series of the show.

== Champions ==
=== Regular series ===
- Series 1 (1990) – Maxine Barrie as Shirley Bassey
- Series 2 (1991) – Bernard Wenton as Nat "King" Cole
- Series 3 (1992) – Amanda Normansell as Patsy Cline
- Series 4 (1993) – Jacquii Cann as Alison Moyet
- Series 5 (1994) – John Finch as Marti Pellow
- Series 6 (1995) – Lee Griffiths as Bobby Darin
- Series 7 (1996) – Paul Doody as Marti Pellow
- Series 8 (1997) – Faye Dempsey as Olivia Newton-John
- Series 9 (1998) – Jason Searle as Neil Diamond
- Series 10 (1999) – Ian Moor as Chris De Burgh (also won Champion of Champions)
- Series 11 (Spring/Summer 2000) – Gary Mullen as Freddie Mercury
- Series 12 (Autumn/Winter 2000) – Nicola Kirsch as Maria Callas
- Series 13 (2001) – Emma Wilkinson as Dusty Springfield
- Series 14 (2002) – Stewart Duff as Elvis Presley
- Series 15 (2004) – Charles Ngandwe as Paul Robeson
- Series 16 (2005) – Gordon Hendricks as Elvis Presley
- Series 17 (2015) – Peter Sarsfield as Frankie Valli

=== Junior series ===
- Series 1 (2002) – Charlotte Gethin as Eva Cassidy
- Series 2 (2003) – Laura Jenkins as Connie Francis
- Series 3 (2004) – Paul Cowperthwaite as Michael Jackson
- Series 4 (2006) – Christopher Napier as George Formby

== Transmissions ==
=== Main series ===
Series	Start date	End date	Episodes	Host
1	21 July 1990	25 August 1990	6	Leslie Crowther
2	8 June 1991	13 July 1991	6	Leslie Crowther
3	22 February 1992	28 March 1992	6	Leslie Crowther
4	22 May 1993	24 July 1993	10	Matthew Kelly
5	14 May 1994	16 July 1994	10	Matthew Kelly
6	6 May 1995	8 July 1995	10	Matthew Kelly
7	2 March 1996	25 May 1996	13	Matthew Kelly
8	15 March 1997	7 June 1997	13	Matthew Kelly
9	21 March 1998	13 June 1998	13	Matthew Kelly
10	13 March 1999	5 June 1999	13	Matthew Kelly
11	11 March 2000	20 May 2000	11	Matthew Kelly
12	23 September 2000	2 December 2000	11	Matthew Kelly
13	5 May 2001	14 July 2001	11	Matthew Kelly
14	16 February 2002	27 April 2002	11	Matthew Kelly
15	3 January 2004	13 March 2004	11	Matthew Kelly
16	15 January 2005	26 March 2005	11	Cat Deeley
17	10 January 2015	14 February 2015	6	Harry Hill

=== Stars in Their Eyes: Kids ===
Series	Start date	End date	Episodes	Host
Pilot	21 July 2001		1	Matthew Kelly
1	31 August 2002	5 October 2002	6	Matthew Kelly
2	5 April 2003	31 May 2003	9	Cat Deeley
3	20 March 2004	15 May 2004	9	Cat Deeley
4	21 January 2006	18 March 2006	9	Cat Deeley

=== Specials ===
A number of different specials were aired during the course of the show's original run, the majority of which featured celebrities as the contestants.

==== Non-celebrity ====
Date	Entitle	Host
28 December 1991	Christmas Special	Leslie Crowther
15 February 1992	Highlights Special	Leslie Crowther
2 January 1993	Elvis Special	Russ Abbot
1 January 1994	Christmas Special	Matthew Kelly
7 May 1994	Favourites Special	Matthew Kelly
24 December 1994	Winners Special	Matthew Kelly
23 December 1995	Christmas Special	Matthew Kelly
30 October 1999	Champion of Champions Special	Matthew Kelly
26 December 2000	Christmas Special	Matthew Kelly
14 April 2001	Stars in Euro Eyes	Matthew Kelly
25 December 2001	Christmas Special	Matthew Kelly
26 October 2002	European Championships (Part 1)	Matthew Kelly
2 November 2002	European Championships (Part 2)	Matthew Kelly
7 January 2006	Family Special	Cat Deeley

==== Celebrity ====
Date	Entitle	Host
2 December 1998	Celebrity Special	Matthew Kelly
9 October 1999	Celebrity Special	Matthew Kelly
1 January 2000	Celebrity Special	Matthew Kelly
1 July 2000	Celebrity Special	Matthew Kelly
16 September 2000	Celebrity Special	Matthew Kelly
6 October 2001	Popstars in their Eyes Special	Matthew Kelly
24 November 2001	Coronation Street Special	Matthew Kelly
4 May 2002	Celebrity Divas Special	Matthew Kelly
11 May 2002	Coronation Street Special	Matthew Kelly
17 August 2002	Popstars Special	Matthew Kelly
12 October 2002	Celebrity Special	Matthew Kelly
28 December 2002	Celebrity Christmas Special	Matthew Kelly
1 February 2003	Legends Special	Davina McCall
8 February 2003	Coronation Street Special	Davina McCall
22 February 2003	Soapstars Special	Davina McCall
16 August 2003	I'm a Celebrity Special	Matthew Kelly
23 August 2003	Soapstars Special	Matthew Kelly
27 December 2003	Christmas Celebrity Special	Matthew Kelly
24 April 2004	Celebrity Special	Cat Deeley
1 May 2004	Soapstars Special	Cat Deeley
8 May 2004	Celebrity Special	Cat Deeley
26 June 2004	Celebrity Special	Cat Deeley
3 July 2004	Soapstars Special	Cat Deeley
17 July 2004	Celebrity Special	Cat Deeley
18 December 2004	Celebrity Special	Cat Deeley
2 April 2005	Celebrity Special	Cat Deeley
23 July 2005	Celebrity Special	Cat Deeley
30 July 2005	Soapstars Special	Cat Deeley
6 August 2005	Reality TV Stars Special	Cat Deeley
13 August 2005	Celebrity Special	Cat Deeley
24 December 2005	Celebrity Duets	Cat Deeley
25 March 2006	Celebrity Special	Cat Deeley
1 April 2006	Celebrity Special	Cat Deeley
8 April 2006	Celebrity Special	Cat Deeley
23 December 2006	Celebrity Special	Cat Deeley

== Reception ==
=== Ratings and awards ===
It is still one of Britain's most successful shows of all time, attracting around 13 million viewers for the live grand final at the end of each series. It has one of the most memorable catchphrases in British TV history: 'Tonight, Matthew, I'm going to be...’ and was named Most Popular Entertainment Programme at the National Television Awards in 1996, 1998, 1999 and 2000. The show was nominated for the same award again in 1997, 2001 and 2002 but lost out to other ITV shows (An Evening With Lily Savage in 1997, My Kind of Music in 2001 and Pop Idol in 2002).

== See also ==
- Soundmixshow
- European Soundmix Show
- Stars in Euro Eyes 2001
- Stars in Their Eyes European Championships 2002
