= Ian Moor =

English singer

Ian Moor (Naturally)
- Born: 4 January 1974 (age 52); North Ferriby, East Riding of Yorkshire
- Occupations: Singer, Science Technician
- Years active: 1999–present

Ian John Moor (born 4 January 1974, in North Ferriby, East Riding of Yorkshire) is an English singer, and the Stars in Their Eyes Champion of Champions.

== Career ==
In 1999 Moor won the ITV show Stars in Their Eyes produced by Granada Television, Manchester in 1999, with his impersonation of Irish musician and songwriter Chris De Burgh. He sang De Burgh's 1986 song "The Lady in Red".

Later the same year he won the Stars in Their Eyes Champion of Champions title, which pitted the grand finalists of the previous decade together. Moore received a total of 481,525 votes - more than double the number of votes of his nearest competitor.

The following year, in 2000 Moor returned for his final appearance on Stars in Their Eyes as a guest, returning for the eleventh series live grand final, (won by the Freddie Mercury impersonator, Gary Mullen). Moor was joined on stage during his performance by De Burgh for a duet. Following success on Stars in Their Eyes, in 2000, Moor went on to record an album with BMG. Entitled Naturally, it peaked at No. 38 on the UK Albums Chart.

=== The Society of M.I.C.E. ===
Moor is a member and supporter of the fundraising group The Society of M.I.C.E.
