= Come Walk with Me (album) =

Studio album by Oleta Adams
- Released: 1997
- Studio: Vanguard Recording Complex (Detroit, Michigan)
- Genre: Gospel; Christian
- Length: 54:21
- Label: Harmony
- Producer: Michael J. Powell; Oleta Adams

Oleta Adams chronology
The Very Best of Oleta Adams (1996)	Come Walk with Me (1997)	All the Love (2001)

Professional ratings
Review scores
Source	Rating
AllMusic	3/5 stars

Come Walk with Me is the sixth studio album by the American musician Oleta Adams, released in 1997.

== History ==
Come Walk with Me is Adams' first gospel music album. Adams, being the daughter of a minister, had been trained in singing gospel music since she was a child, and sang at her local church choir. Gospel music was always a strong influence in her previous recordings, but it was never fully explored as in this album.

It was her first album after leaving Mercury Records, which had released her previous three studio albums and a compilation. Adams signed to Christian music label Harmony Records to release the album. The record was co-produced by Adams and Michael J. Powell, who had also produced some songs on Adams' previous album Moving On.

The album was well-received critically, and charted in the top 10 of the US Billboard Gospel and Christian charts. The songs "Holy Is the Lamb" and "This Love Won't Fail" were released as radio-only singles.

Adams contributed the Christmas song "A Child Was Born Into My Life" for a compilation album titled Christmas Harmony in 1998, after which she left Harmony Records.

== Track listing ==
No.	Title	Writer(s)	Length
1.	"Holy Is the Lamb"	Fred White	4:41
2.	"I Will Love You"	Oleta Adams	5:30
3.	"What Price"	Kevin Bond	7:03
4.	"Come and Walk with Me"	Adams	6:06
5.	"If You're Willing"	Adams, Raymel Menefee	4:39
6.	"This Love Won't Fail"	Raina Bundy, Skip Scarborough	5:34
7.	"Wash, O God, Our Sons & Daughters"	Ruth Duck, Benjamin Franklin White, Ronald A. Nelson	3:29
8.	"The Captain of My Ship"	Adams, Menefee	5:38
9.	"Never Far Away"	Adams	6:28
10.	"Beams of Heaven"	Charles Albert Tindley	5:06
Total length:			54:14

== Personnel ==
- Oleta Adams – vocals, acoustic piano, additional keyboards, backing vocals (4, 5, 8), arrangements
- Michael J. Powell – keyboard programming, guitars, live percussion, arrangements
- Vernon D. Fails – electric piano (1–8, 10), synthesizers (1–8, 10)
- Van Cephus – Hammond organ (5, 9, 10)
- Curtiss Boone – Moog synthesizer solo (8)
- Al Turner – bass
- John Cushon – live drums, percussion, drum programming
- Paul Riser – live string arrangements and conductor (7)
- J. Edward Hoy – arrangements (10)
- Rodney Barber, Derrick L. Brown, Vanessa Durrah, Lajuana B. Henderson, Sandra Hudson, Iva Johnson, Donald Lawrence, Erica McCollough, Arnetta Murill-Crooms, Sharla L. Reed, Tami Y. Spann, LeJuene Thompson, Eric Young and Michael A. Young – choir (1, 6)
- Special Gift [LaTonya Holman, Donyle Jones, Kayla D. Parker and Meri Thomas] – backing vocals (2)
- Kayla D. Parker – BGV arrangements (2)
- Eric Dawkins – backing vocals (4)
- Leslie Ferguson – backing vocals (5, 8)
- Jerry Davis – backing vocals (5, 8)

Production

- Raina Bundy – executive producer
- Oleta Adams – producer, liner notes
- Michael J. Powell – producer, mixing
- Gerard Smerek – engineer, mixing
- Greg Henley – assistant engineer
- George Marino – mastering at Sterling Sound (New York City, New York)
- David Bett – art direction
- Danny Clinch – photography
- Gallin Morey Associates – management

== Charts ==
Chart (1997)	Peak position
Billboard Top Gospel Albums	4
Billboard Top Contemporary Christian	10
Dutch album chart	78
