= Evolution (Oleta Adams album) =

Studio album by Oleta Adams
- Released: July 26, 1993
- Studio: Andora Studios (North Hollywood, California)
- Genre: Jazz; soul
- Length: 57:14
- Label: Fontana (PolyGram)
- Producer: Stewart Levine

Oleta Adams chronology
Circle of One (1990)	Evolution (1993)	Moving On (1995)

Singles from Evolution
- 1. "I Just Had to Hear Your Voice" Released: June 28, 1993; 2. "Window of Hope" Released: August 23, 1993; 3. "Easier to Say Goodbye" Released: 1994 (EU); 4. "My Heart Won't Lie" Released: 1994 (EU)

Professional ratings
Review scores
Source	Rating
AllMusic	3/5 stars
NME	1/10
Rolling Stone	3/5 stars

Evolution is the fourth album (second published worldwide) by the American vocalist, pianist and songwriter Oleta Adams and was released in 1993. The album is the follow-up to Adams' worldwide hit album Circle of One and is fully produced by Stewart Levine. Like its predecessor, Evolution consists of songs with a mix of jazz, soul, pop and gospel. Evolution features three cover versions: the James Taylor song "Don't Let Me Be Lonely Tonight", Billy Joel's "New York State of Mind" and Ivan Lins' "Evolution". Adams wrote six of the twelve album tracks, and it also features a song written by songwriter Diane Warren.

== Commercial performance ==
Evolution entered the top 10 in the UK Albums Chart. However, without the aid of a big hit single, the album dropped quickly and only stayed in the charts for seven weeks. In the US, the album peaked at #67 and stayed only 13 weeks in the charts. It had more success in continental Europe, most notably in the Netherlands where it peaked at #6 and stayed in the chart for almost a year.

== Singles ==
Five singles were taken from the album. The lead single, "I Just Had to Hear Your Voice", failed to become a big hit as "Get Here" had been for her previous album. It peaked at #42 in the UK Singles Chart and did not chart in the US Billboard Hot 100. Other singles failed to chart in both countries. However, they sold better in continental Europe. These were the gospel-tinged "Window of Hope", "Easier to Say (Goodbye)" and "My Heart Won't Lie".

== Track listing ==
No.	Title	Writer(s)	Length
1.	"My Heart Won't Lie"	Oleta Adams	4:42
2.	"Hold Me for a While"	Adams	5:11
3.	"Don't Let Me Be Lonely Tonight"	James Taylor	4:45
4.	"When Love Comes to the Rescue"	Adams	5:16
5.	"I Just Had to Hear Your Voice"	Allan Rich, Jud Friedman	3:38
6.	"Come When You Call"	Aaron Zigman, Jerry Knight	4:14
7.	"Easier to Say Goodbye"	Adams	6:32
8.	"Lover's Holiday"	Adams	4:11
9.	"The Day I Stop Loving You"	Diane Warren	5:04
10.	"New York State of Mind"	Billy Joel	5:33
11.	"Evolution"	Brock Walsh, Ivan Lins	3:41
12.	"Window of Hope"	Adams	4:24
Total length:			57:12

Japanese bonus track
No.	Title	Writer(s)	Length
13.	"Oh Me, Oh My (I'm a Fool for You Baby)"	Jim Doris	4:39

== Non-album tracks ==
"Oh Me, Oh My" was one of the B-sides of the "Window of Hope" single, the others being "You Won't Get Away" and "I Believe You". "Oh Me, Oh My" was also used as a B-side for "My Heart Won't Lie", along with "Let Me Be the One" and "I Believe You". "You Won't Get Away" (a song that had already featured on Adams' self-released 1983 album Going on Record) also appeared on the "Easier to Say Goodbye" single, alongside two more non-album tracks: "Blessed with You" and "No Secrets".

"The Day I Stop Loving You" was released as a remix by David Foster, which is a minute shorter than the album version.

== Personnel ==
- Oleta Adams – lead vocals,Yamaha C7E MIDI acoustic piano (1, 2, 4, 5, 7–12), synthesizers (1, 2, 4, 5, 7, 8, 10–12), electric piano (3), backing vocals (6, 7)
- Aaron Zigman – keyboards (1, 6), synth strings (1, 5), synthesizer programming (2, 4, 7, 8, 10, 12), string programming (2, 4, 8, 10, 12), horns (7), string synthesizer programming (11)
- Neil Larsen – Hammond B3 organ (3, 5, 10)
- Michael Landau – guitars (1–6, 10, 11), guitar solo (7), acoustic guitar and solo (9)
- Ray Fuller – guitars (4, 7, 8, 12)
- Freddie Washington – bass (1, 2, 4, 5, 7, 10, 11), fretless bass (3, 9)
- Jerry Knight – bass (6), backing vocals (6)
- Larry Kimpel – bass (8, 12)
- Richie Stevens – drums (1–5, 7–12), drum programming (4, 7, 11, 12), additional drum programming (6)
- Gota Yashiki – drums (6), drum programming (6)
- Lenny Castro – percussion (2, 4, 6–9, 12)
- Tom Scott – tenor saxophone (2, 10, 11)
- David Sanborn – alto saxophone (3)
- Chuck Findley – flugelhorn (2, 6, 11), flugelhorn solo (4), muted trumpets (6), trumpet (10)
- Paulette Brown – backing vocals (7, 12)
- Bunny Hill – backing vocals (7, 12)
- Arnold McCuller – backing vocals (7, 12)
- Ricky Nelson – backing vocals (7, 12)
- Valerie Pinkston-Mayo – backing vocals (7, 12)
- Fred White – backing vocals (7, 12)
- Perri (Carolyn, Darlene, Lori and Sharon Perry) – backing vocals (12)

Production

- Stewart Levine – producer, arrangements
- Oleta Adams – arrangements
- Daren Klein – recording, mixing
- Gonzalo "Bino" Espinoza – second engineer
- Bernie Grundman – mastering at Bernie Grundman Mastering (Hollywood, California)
- Peter Barrett – design
- Andrew Biscomb – design
- Randee St. Nicholas – photography
- Gallin Morey Associates – management

== Charts ==
=== Weekly charts ===
Chart (1993)	Peak position
Australian Albums (ARIA)	167
Dutch Albums (Album Top 100)	6
German Albums (Offizielle Top 100)	37
Swiss Albums (Schweizer Hitparade)	25
UK Albums (OCC)	10
US Billboard 200	67
US Top R&B/Hip-Hop Albums (Billboard)	20

=== Year-end charts ===
Chart (1993)	Position
Dutch Albums (Album Top 100)	45
Chart (1994)	Position
Dutch Albums (Album Top 100)	84
