= European Soundmix Show 1999 =

Date and venue
- Final: 22 May 1999
- Venue: Endemol Studios, Amsterdam, Netherlands

Organisation
- Host broadcaster: (Netherlands) Endemol
- Presenters: Linda de Mol

Participants
- Number of entries: 7
- Debuting countries: None
- Returning countries: Belgium
- Non-returning countries: Hungary; Sweden

Vote
- Voting system: Each country had 2 jury members who awarded the top 4 countries 1, 2, 3 and 5 points.

The European Soundmix Show 1999 was the fourth European Soundmix Show.

Like the previous contests, this one was held in Amsterdam, and the winner was the host, the Netherlands with Cherwin Muringen imitating Seal.

== Results ==
Pos	Country	Performer	Imitated artist	Points
1	Netherlands	Cherwin Muringen	Seal	20
2	Belgium	C-Stone & Roeland Vandersloten	U2	18
3	Poland	Marcin Szaniawski	Jamiroquai	15
4	Germany	Mia Aegerter	Natalie Imbruglia	14
5	Norway	Helene Silvia Moen	Sarah Brightman	4
6	Portugal	Ricardo Sousa & Sandra Godinho	Meatloaf [sic]	4
7	Spain	Lluís Masclans	George Michael	2
