= European Soundmix Show 1996 =

Music event

Date and venue
- Final: 27 April 1996
- Venue: Endemol Studios, Amsterdam, Netherlands

Organisation
- Host broadcaster: (Netherlands) Endemol
- Presenters: Linda de Mol

Participants
- Number of entries: 10
- Debuting countries: Belgium; Denmark; Germany; Italy; Netherlands; Norway; Portugal; Spain; Sweden; United Kingdom

Vote
- Voting system: Each country had 1 jury member who awarded the top 4 countries 1, 2, 3 and 5 points.

The European Soundmix Show 1996 was the first European Soundmix Show.

It was held in Amsterdam, the Netherlands, and Germany won the show with Bianca Shomburg imitating Celine Dion.

== Results ==
Draw	Country	Contestant	Imitated artist	Performing the song	Place	Points
1	Belgium	Marianne van Eynde	Tina Turner	GoldenEye	9	3
2	Portugal	Rui Faria Santos	Elton John	Can You Feel the Love Tonight	2	18
3	Spain	Silvia, Laura & Patricia Ugarte	The Andrews Sisters	Medley	5	12
4	Sweden	Henrik Åberg	Elvis Presley	Love Me Tender	8	4
5	Italy	Walter Lamberti, Tony Ingui, Tony Buongrazio, Valentino Brandi, Giuseppe Galizia	Take That	Sure	7	8
6	Norway	Christina Undhjem	Whitney Houston	I Will Always Love You	2	18
7	United Kingdom	Terry Nash	Meat Loaf	Dead Ringer for Love	10	2
8	Netherlands	Arno Kolenbrander	Simon Bowman	Why God Why?	4	13
9	Denmark	Gry Trampedach	Sanne Salomonsen	Love Don't Bother Me	6	10
10	Germany	Bianca Shomburg	Celine Dion	Think Twice	1	21
