= European Soundmix Show 1998 =

Date and venue
- Final: 25 April 1998
- Venue: Endemol Studios, Amsterdam, Netherlands

Organisation
- Host broadcaster: (Netherlands) Endemol
- Presenters: Bobbie Eakes, Jeff Trachta

Participants
- Number of entries: 8
- Debuting countries: Hungary; Poland
- Returning countries: None
- Non-returning countries: Belgium; Denmark

Vote
- Voting system: Each country had 2 jury members who awarded the top 4 countries 1, 2, 3 and 5 points.

The European Soundmix Show 1998 was the third European Soundmix Show.

Like the previous contests, this one was held in Amsterdam, and the winner was Portugal with Carlos Bruno imitating Michael Stipe (R.E.M.).

== Results ==
Draw	Country	Contestant	Imitated artist	Performing the song	Place	Points
1	Norway	Toril Moe	Celine Dion	All by Myself	3	11
2	Sweden	Cecilia Karlsson	Dolly Parton	9 to 5	5	8
3	Portugal	Carlos Bruno	Michael Stipe (R.E.M.)	Everybody Hurts	1	22
4	Netherlands	Mary Ann Morales	Lea Salonga	The Movie in My Mind	4	10
5	Hungary	Timia Kasai	The Cranberries	Zombie	8	2
6	Spain	José Luis Ngale	Louis Armstrong	Hello, Dolly!	7	7
7	Poland	Magdalena Piwowarczyk	Sinéad O'Connor	Nothing Compares 2 U	2	20
8	Germany	Kirstin Hesse	Madonna	Don't Cry for Me Argentina	6	8

== Scoreboard ==
		Results								
		Total score	Norway	Sweden	Portugal	Netherlands	Hungary	Spain	Poland	Germany
Contestants	Norway	11		5			3			3
Contestants	Sweden	8	2			3	2		1	
Contestants	Portugal	22	5	2		1	5	3	5	1
Contestants	Netherlands	10	3	1	1				3	2
Contestants	Hungary	2						2		
Contestants	Spain	7	1		2	2			2	
Contestants	Poland	20		3	5	5	1	1		5
Contestants	Germany	8			3			5		

=== 5 points ===
Below is a summary of all 5 points in the final:

N.	Contestant	Voting nation
3	Poland	Germany, Netherlands, Portugal
3	Portugal	Hungary, Norway, Poland
1	Germany	Spain
1	Norway	Sweden
