= Let's Stay Here =

Studio album by Oleta Adams
- Released: April 21, 2009
- Studio: Groundworx Studios (Edina, Minnesota); Headman Music and Mastermix Recording Studios (New York City, New York)
- Genre: Jazz; Funk; Soul
- Length: 54:34
- Label: Koch
- Producer: Paul Peterson; Oleta Adams

Oleta Adams chronology
Christmas Time with Oleta (2006)	Let's Stay Here (2009)	Third Set (2017)

Let's Stay Here is the ninth album by American singer, pianist and songwriter Oleta Adams, released April 21, 2009 on Koch.

== Track listing ==
No.	Title	Writer(s)	Length
1.	"Feelin' Good"	Anthony Newley, Leslie Bricusse	4:53
2.	"Picture You the Way That I Do"	Oleta Adams	4:39
3.	"We Can't Stay Here"	Adams	5:36
4.	"No Way to Love Me"	Adams	5:59
5.	"Another Day Has Come and Gone"	Adams	5:05
6.	"Best That I Can Do"	Adams	4:29
7.	"Let's Stay Here"	Adams	5:41
8.	"Don't Explain"	Arthur Herzog, Jr., Billie Holiday	5:35
9.	"Yesterday"	Adams	5:08
10.	"Act of Forgiveness"	Adams	7:29
Total length:			54:34

== Personnel ==
- Oleta Adams – vocals, backing vocals, acoustic piano, keyboards, arrangements
- Paul Peterson – various instruments, programming, organ, guitars, bass, drum programming, whirly tube
- Billy Peterson – keyboards, arrangements
- Ricky Peterson – organ, percussion programming, backing vocals
- Everett Freeman – organ
- Joe DiBlasi – guitars
- Jimmy Dykes – acoustic guitar
- Billy Franze – guitars
- John Cushon – drums, percussion, drum programming, percussion programming, udu, horn arrangements
- Jason Peterson Delaire – drums, horns, backing vocals
- Ray Stewart – percussion
- Kim Park – alto saxophone
- Stan Kessler – trumpet
- Greg Clark – backing vocals
- Darius de Haas – backing vocals
- John James – backing vocals
- Bukeka Newby-Shoals – backing vocals
- Patty Peterson – backing vocals

=== Production ===
- Oleta Adams – producer, liner notes
- Paul Peterson – producer, engineer
- David Lohr – engineer
- Brian Powers – engineer
- Tom Tucker – engineer, mixing
- Steve Hodge – mixing
- Adam Krinsky – assistant engineer
- Paul Grosso – creative director, design
- Randee St. Nicholas – photography
- Chevy Nash – management
