= Stars in Their Eyes European Championships 2002 =

International talent show

Dates
- Final: 27 October & 2 November 2002

Host
- Venue: Manchester, United Kingdom
- Presenter(s): Matthew Kelly
- Host broadcaster: (United Kingdom) ITV Productions

Participants
- Number of entries: 10
- Debuting countries: Ireland
- Returning countries: None
- Non-returning countries: Hungary

Vote
- Voting system: Unknown

The Stars in Their Eyes European Championships 2002 was the second and last special European Soundmix Show.

Like the show from 2001, this one was held in Manchester. The competition was divided on two shows. It was produced by Granada Television and ITV. The show was mainly made for the British audience, and was not aired on television in all the competing countries. The debutant Ireland won the competition with Rebecca O'Connor imitating Tina Turner.

Pos	Country	Performer	Imitated artist	Points
1	Ireland	Rebecca O'Connor	Tina Turner	89
2	Italy	Walter, Davide and Pasquale Egiziano	Bee Gees	81
3	Spain	Connie Lynch	Bonnie Tyler	80
3	Belgium	Fernando Espeso Calvo	Julio Iglesias	80
5	Netherlands	Shanella James	Mary J. Blige	78
6	United Kingdom	Stewart Duff	Elvis Presley	73
7	Sweden	Mirna Tutnjevic	Britney Spears	63
8	Norway	Ronny Inderberg	Garth Brooks	61
9	Germany	Guido Westermann	Bon Jovi	58
10	Portugal	Yolanda	Shania Twain	51
