= Circle of One =

Studio album by Oleta Adams
- Released: May 14, 1990
- Recorded: 1990
- Studio: Real World Studios (Wiltshire)
- Genres: R&B; soul
- Length: 47:05
- Label: Fontana
- Producers: Roland Orzabal; David Bascombe

Oleta Adams chronology
Going on Record (1983)	Circle of One (1990)	Evolution (1993)

Singles from Circle of One
- 1. "Rhythm of Life" Released: March 1990; 2. "Circle of One" Released: July 1990; 3. "Get Here" Released: November 1990; 4. "You've Got To Give Me Room" Released: April 1991

Professional ratings
Review scores
Source	Rating
AllMusic	4.5/5 stars
Entertainment Weekly	A−
NME	9/10

Circle of One is the third studio album by American vocalist, pianist, and songwriter Oleta Adams and was released on May 14, 1990, in Europe and on June 19, 1990, in the United States. Circle of One was Adams' first album to receive wide distribution; her two earlier albums (an untitled album in 1982 and Going on Record in 1983) were self-financed and received only local distribution.

== History ==
After a successful collaboration with Tears for Fears on their 1989 album The Seeds of Love, Adams was offered a record deal of her own with Tears for Fears then-label Fontana Records. Produced by Tears for Fears' Roland Orzabal with Dave Bascombe, the album was initially unsuccessful (peaking at no.49 in the UK) as were the first two singles "Rhythm of Life" and "Circle of One". However, Adams had a hit in early 1991 with the third single from the album, her cover of Brenda Russell's "Get Here," which peaked at #4 in the UK Singles Chart and #5 on the US Billboard Hot 100. The album, which had received considerable critical acclaim, was re-released with two additional tracks and re-entered the UK Albums Chart at no.1 and made the Top 20 of the US Billboard 200. It was certified Gold in both the UK and the US. "Rhythm of Life" was actually released as a single four times in the UK (twice in 1990, and again in 1991 as a double A-side with the track "You've Got To Give Me Room"). Each time, it missed the Top 40 until a remix of the track was released in late 1995 which peaked at no.38. In 1992, "Get Here" was nominated for Best Female Pop Vocal Performance at the 34th Annual Grammy Awards.

An expanded double CD reissue was released in 2018 via Caroline International.

== Track listing ==
No.	Title	Writer(s)	Producer(s)	Length
1.	"Rhythm of Life"	Nicky Holland, Roland Orzabal	remixed by William Orbit	4:23
2.	"Get Here"	Brenda Russell		4:36
3.	"Circle of One"	Oleta Adams		3:54
4.	"You've Got to Give Me Room"	Adams		5:17
5.	"I've Got to Sing My Song"	Adams		4:01
6.	"I've Got a Right"	Adams		4:00
7.	"Will We Ever Learn"	Nicky Holland, Ellen Shipley		5:14
8.	"Everything Must Change"	Benard Ighner		6:53
9.	"Don't Look Too Closely"	Adams		4:27
10.	"Circle of One" (Remix)	Adams		4:16
Total length:				47:05

- Note: Tracks 9 and 10 were not on the original 1990 release.

2018 deluxe edition:

9. "Don't Look Too Closely" (Adams) 4:27
10. "I've Got to Sing My Song" (live at Santa Barbara)(B-Side of "Get Here") 4:31
11. "Birdland" (B-Side of "Get Here") 3:17
12. "Think Again" (B-Side of "Circle of One") (Adams)
13. "Watch What Happens" (B-Side of "Circle of One") 4:21
14. "Don't Let the Sun Go Down on Me" (Single Mix) 5:55
15. "Rhythm of Life" (Rhythm & Prophet) 4:33
16. "Don't Let the Sun Go Down on Me" (Edit) 3:40
17. "Rhythm of Life" (Gospella) 4:19

CD 2:

1. "Circle of One" (Full Cycle 12") 6:29
2. "Circle of One" (Hot Mix 12") 4:18
3. "Circle of One" (T Remix) 6:00
4. "Circle of One" (Yvonne's Circle Club Mix) 6:06

"Rhythm of Life" (1991 remixes)

5. "Rhythm of Life" (Full Mega) 8:05
6. "Rhythm of Life" (Rhythm Dub) 5:40
7. "Rhythm of Life" (Syncopated Urban Mix 7" Version) 4:07
8. "Rhythm of Life" (Syncopated Urban Mix 12" Version) 5:08

"Rhythm of Life" (1995 remixes)

9. "Rhythm of Life" (Heavenly Edit) 5:21
10. "Rhythm of Life" (Reverend Jefferson's Choo Choo Dub Mix) 6:35
11. "Rhythm of Life" (Reverend Jefferson's Deeper Rhythm Mix) 9:22
12. "Rhythm of Life" (Jules & Skin's Rhythm Mix) 7:17

== Personnel ==
- Oleta Adams – vocals, keyboards (1, 2, 4, 9), Hammond organ (1, 6, 7), acoustic piano (2, 5–8), backing vocals (9)
- David Bascombe – synthesizers (1)
- Roland Orzabal – Fairlight programming (1, 3), guitar solo (1), synthesizers (2), backing vocals (1, 5)
- Matthew Vaughan – additional programming (1)
- Simon Clark – Hammond organ (3, 5)
- Neil Taylor – guitars (7)
- Pino Palladino – bass (1, 2, 5–9)
- John Cushon – drums (1, 2, 5–9)
- Luís Jardim – percussion (1, 2, 5, 6, 8), ting (8)
- Carole Steele – percussion (7)
- Will Gregory – baritone saxophone (3)
- Guy Barker – flugelhorn (4), brass (6, 7), flugelhorn solo (8)
- Phil Todd – brass (6, 7), sax solo (6, 7)
- Chris White – brass (6, 7)
- John Barclay – brass (6, 7)
- William Orbit – rhythm arrangements (1)
- Anne Dudley – brass arrangements (6, 7), string arrangements (8)
- Andy Caine – backing vocals (1, 3)
- Carol Kenyon – backing vocals (1, 3, 5)
- Tessa Niles – backing vocals (1, 3, 5)
- Ian Wilson – backing vocals (1, 3)
- Adele Bertei – backing vocals (7)
- Biti Strauchn – backing vocals (7)

Production

- David Bascombe – producer
- Roland Orzabal – producer
- William Orbit – remixing (1)
- Bob Ludwig – mastering at Masterdisk (New York, NY)
- The Unknown Partnership – sleeve design
- David Scheinmann – photography

== Charts ==
=== Weekly charts ===
Chart (1990–1991)	Peak position
Australian Albums (ARIA)	131
Dutch Albums (Album Top 100)	28
German Albums (Offizielle Top 100)	37
UK Albums (Official Charts)	1
US Billboard 200	20
US Top R&B/Hip-Hop Albums (Billboard)	11

=== Year-end charts ===
Chart (1991)	Position
US Billboard 200	89
US Top R&B/Hip-Hop Albums (Billboard)	30
