= Bianca Shomburg =

- Born: 17 September 1974 (age 51)
- Origin: Hiddenhausen, West Germany
- Genres: Pop, Country rock
- Occupation: Singer
- Website: Bianca Shomburg

Bianca Shomburg (born 17 September 1974, Hiddenhausen, North Rhine-Westphalia) is a German singer, best known for her participation in the 1997 Eurovision Song Contest.

== Biography ==
In 1996, Shomburg took part in the international TV talent contest European Soundmix Show, which she won, as a result obtaining a recording contract with producer Harold Faltermeyer and releasing her first single, "I Believe in Love".

In 1997, she entered the German Eurovision selection with the Ralph Siegel-composed "Zeit" ("Time"), which had originally been written for Esther Ofarim. "Zeit" emerged the clear winner, and went forward to the 42nd Eurovision Song Contest, held in Dublin on 3 May. However, the song's performance in the contest was quite disappointing: it managed only an 18th-place finish of 25 entries.

Shomburg followed her Eurovision appearance with an English-language album, It's My Time, which failed to sell and remains her only album to date. Unable to make a commercial breakthrough, she subsequently largely disappeared from public view, although for a time she was a singing coach on TV reality show Deutschland sucht den Superstar. Since 2008, Shomburg has been working with country rock band Nashfield.

== Discography ==
Singles

- 1996: "I Believe in Love"
- 1997: "Zeit"
- 1997: "Only Your Love"
- 1998: "Ich lieb' dich mehr"
- 1999: "Ich glaub noch immer an Wunder"

Album

- 1997: It's My Time

Preceded by Stone and Stone with Verliebt in Dich	Germany in the Eurovision Song Contest; 1997	Succeeded by Guildo Horn with Guildo hat euch lieb!
