= Stars in Euro Eyes 2001 =

International talent show

Date and venue
- Final: 14 April 2001
- Venue: Granada Studios, Manchester, United Kingdom

Organisation
- Host broadcaster: ITV Productions
- Presenters: Matthew Kelly

Participants
- Number of entries: 10
- Debuting countries: None
- Returning countries: Hungary; Italy; Sweden; United Kingdom
- Non-returning countries: Poland

Vote
- Voting system: Positional voting system similar to that used in the Eurovision Song Contest

The Stars in Euro Eyes 2001 was the first special European Soundmix Show.

It was held in Manchester, United Kingdom and was produced by Granada Television and ITV. The show was mainly made for the British audience, and not all competing countries aired the show on television. Belgium won the competition with Sonny O' Brien imitating Celine Dion.

== Results ==
Pos	Country	Performer	Imitated artist	Points
1	Belgium	Sonny O' Brien	Celine Dion	70
2	Netherlands	Sylvana Djoemat	Patti LaBelle	56
3	United Kingdom	Gary Mullen	Freddie Mercury	56
4	Portugal	Nádia Sousa	Edith Piaf	36
5	Norway	Benedikte Narum	Joni Mitchell	32
6	Sweden	Katja and Camilla	ABBA	18
7	Germany	Marco Neumann	Marti Pellow	16
8	Hungary	Péter Kovács	Tom Jones	6
8	Italy	Matteo Tarolla	Ricky Martin	6
10	Spain	Ivonne, Patricia and Carol Ballinas	The Three Degrees	4
