= I Just Had to Hear Your Voice =

1993 single by Oleta Adams

Single by Oleta Adams

from the album Evolution
- B-side: "Get Here"; "Think Again"; "Don't Look Too Closely"
- Released: June 28, 1993
- Length: 3:38
- Label: Fontana
- Songwriter(s): Allan Rich; Jud Friedman
- Producer(s): Oleta Adams; Stewart Levine; Darren Klein

Oleta Adams singles chronology
"Woman in Chains" (1992)	"I Just Had to Hear Your Voice" (1993)	"Window of Hope" (1993)

"I Just Had to Hear Your Voice" is a song by American singer Oleta Adams. The single earned Adams a Soul Train nomination for R&B Single of the Year, Female in 1994.

== Charts ==
Chart (1993)	Peak position
Australia (ARIA)	182
Netherlands (Dutch Top 40)	20
Netherlands (Single Top 100)	28
UK Singles (OCC)	42
US Hot R&B/Hip-Hop Songs (Billboard)	97
