= Linda Evans =

American actress

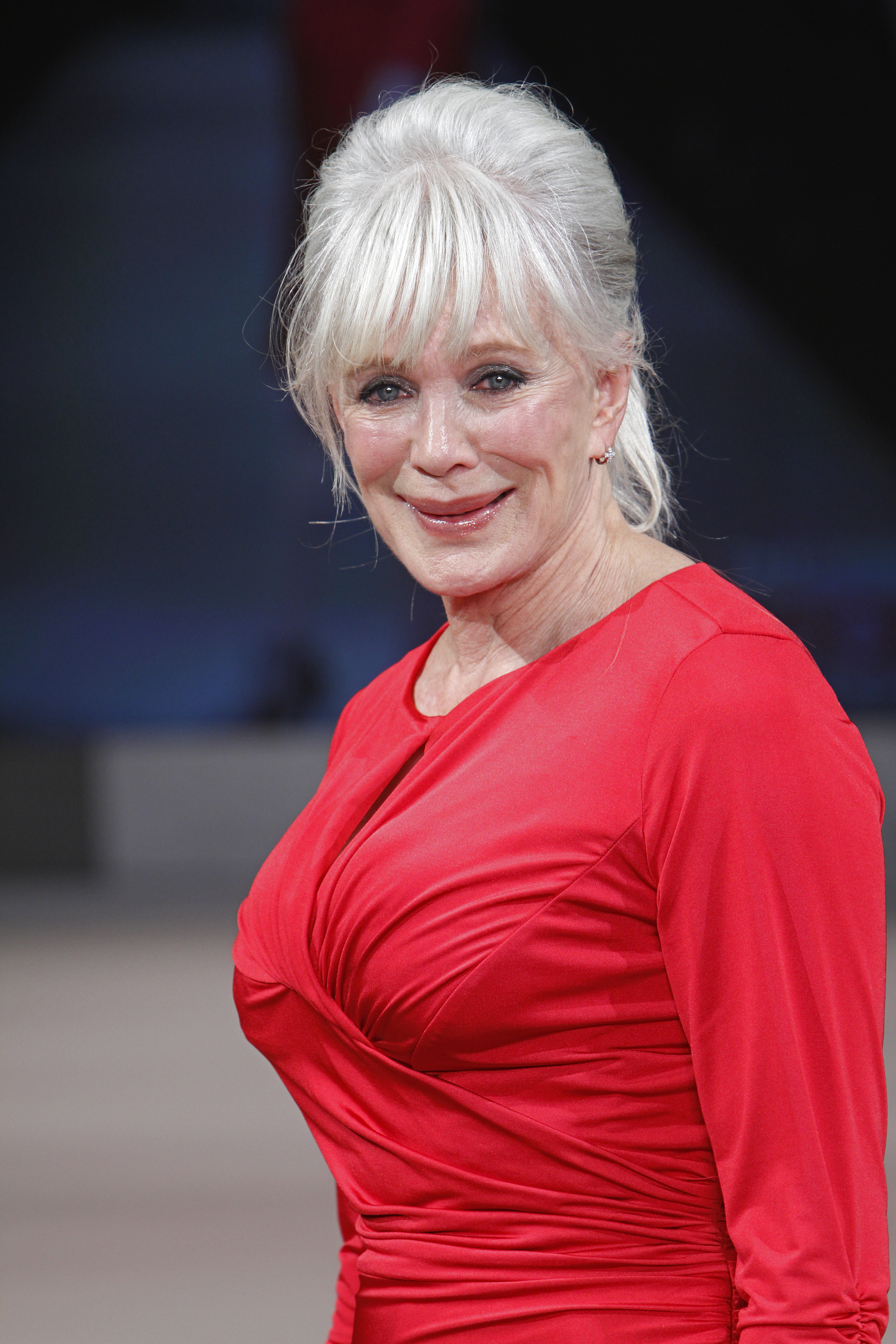
- Evans in 2012
- Born: Linda Evenstad; November 18, 1942 (age 84); Hartford, Connecticut, U.S.
- Education: Hollywood High School
- Occupation: Actress
- Years active: 1960–1997; 2020–present
- Known for: Dynasty; The Big Valley; Avalanche Express; Tom Horn
- Spouses: John Derek (m. 1968; div. 1974) Stan Herman (m. 1975; div. 1979)
- Partner(s): Patrick Curtis (1960–1962); George Santo Pietro (1980–1984); Yanni (1989–1998)

Linda Evans (born Linda Evenstad; November 18, 1942) is an American actress well known for her roles on television. In the 1960s, she played Audra Barkley, the daughter of Victoria Barkley (played by Barbara Stanwyck), in the Western television series The Big Valley (1965–1969). She is best known for portraying Krystle Carrington in the 1980s ABC soap opera Dynasty, a role she played from 1981 to 1989.

== Early life ==
Evans, the second of three daughters, was born Linda Evenstad in Hartford, Connecticut, on November 18, 1942, to Arlene (née Dart) and Alba Evenstad, both of whom were professional dancers. "Evenstad" was the name of the small farm in Nes, Hedmark, in Norway from where her paternal great-grandmother emigrated to the United States in 1884 with her young son (Evans' grandfather) and other relatives. She has two sisters. When Evans was six months old, the family moved from Hartford to North Hollywood. She attended Hollywood High School, where she was a sorority sister of future actress Carole Wells. Her introduction to drama came through classes that she took "as a form of therapy, to cure her of her shyness." When she started her professional career, she changed her last name to "Evans".

== Career ==
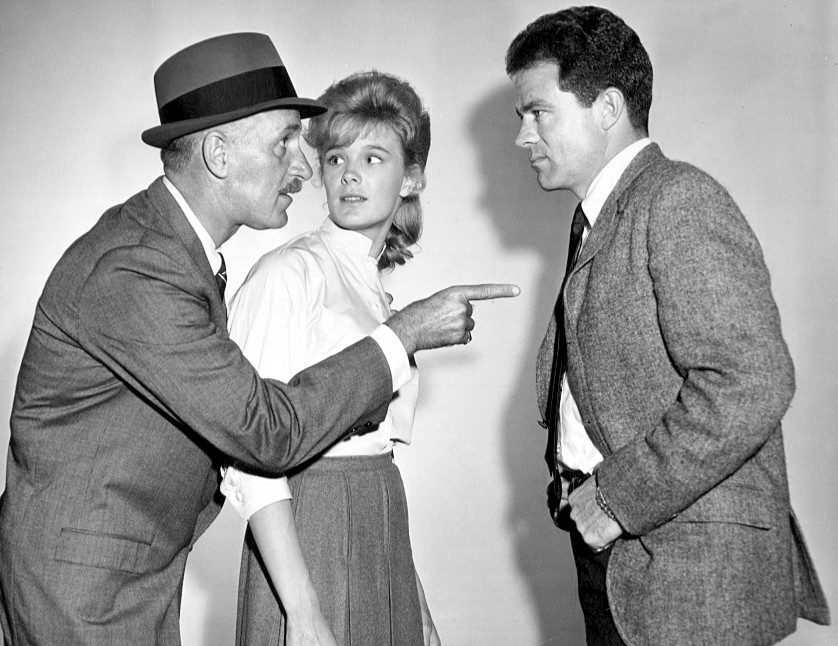
Keenan Wynn, Evans and Jack Ging in television's The Eleventh Hour (1963)

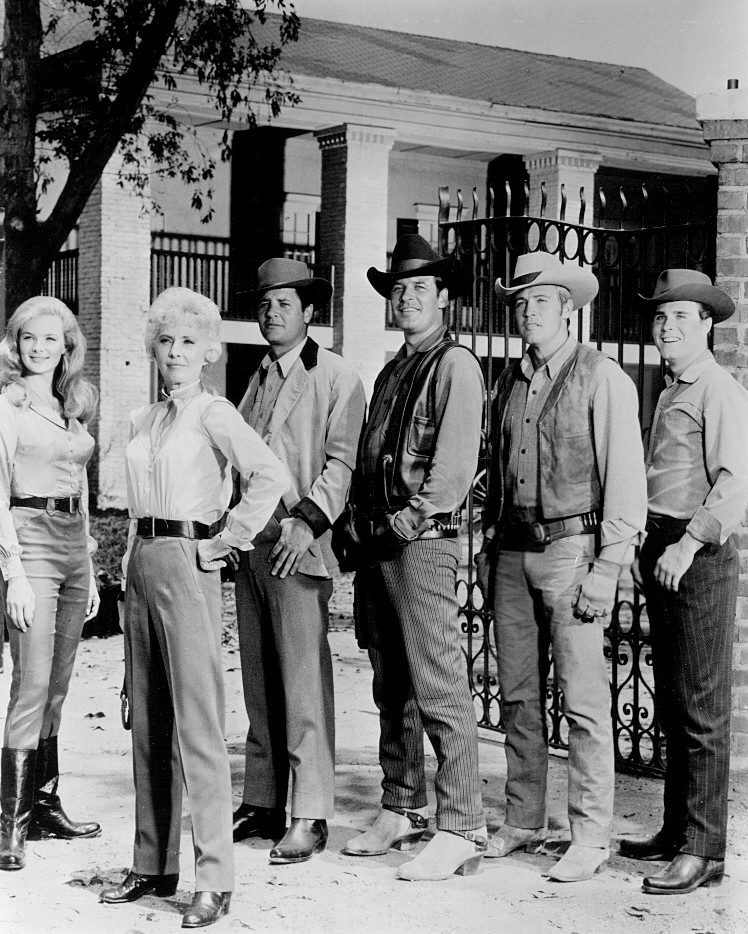
Original cast of The Big Valley (1965) with Evans (Audra), Barbara Stanwyck (Victoria) standing in front of Richard Long (Jarrod), Peter Breck (Nick), Lee Majors (Heath) and Charles Briles (Eugene)

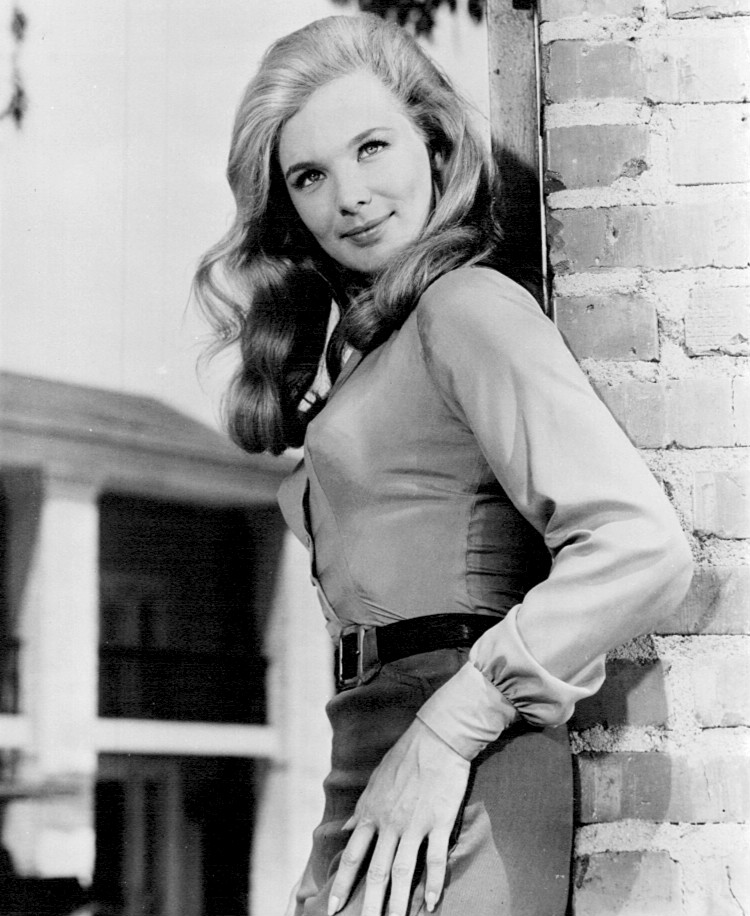
Evans in The Big Valley, 1965

Evans' first guest-starring role was on a 1960 episode of Bachelor Father. The series starred John Forsythe, with whom she would costar 20 years later on Dynasty. After several guest roles in The Adventures of Ozzie and Harriet between 1960 and 1962, and guest appearances on television series such as The Lieutenant and Wagon Train, Evans gained her first regular role in 1965 in The Big Valley. Playing Audra Barkley, daughter of Victoria Barkley (played by Barbara Stanwyck), Evans was credited in the series until it ended in 1969, though she was only a semiregular cast member during the last two seasons.

On December 31, 1967, John Derek recruited his future wife to operate one of his cameras after he had been commissioned by daredevil Evel Knievel to film his motorcycle jump of the fountains at Caesars Palace in Las Vegas. Evans and John Derek photographed Knievel's devastating crash after the jump failed.

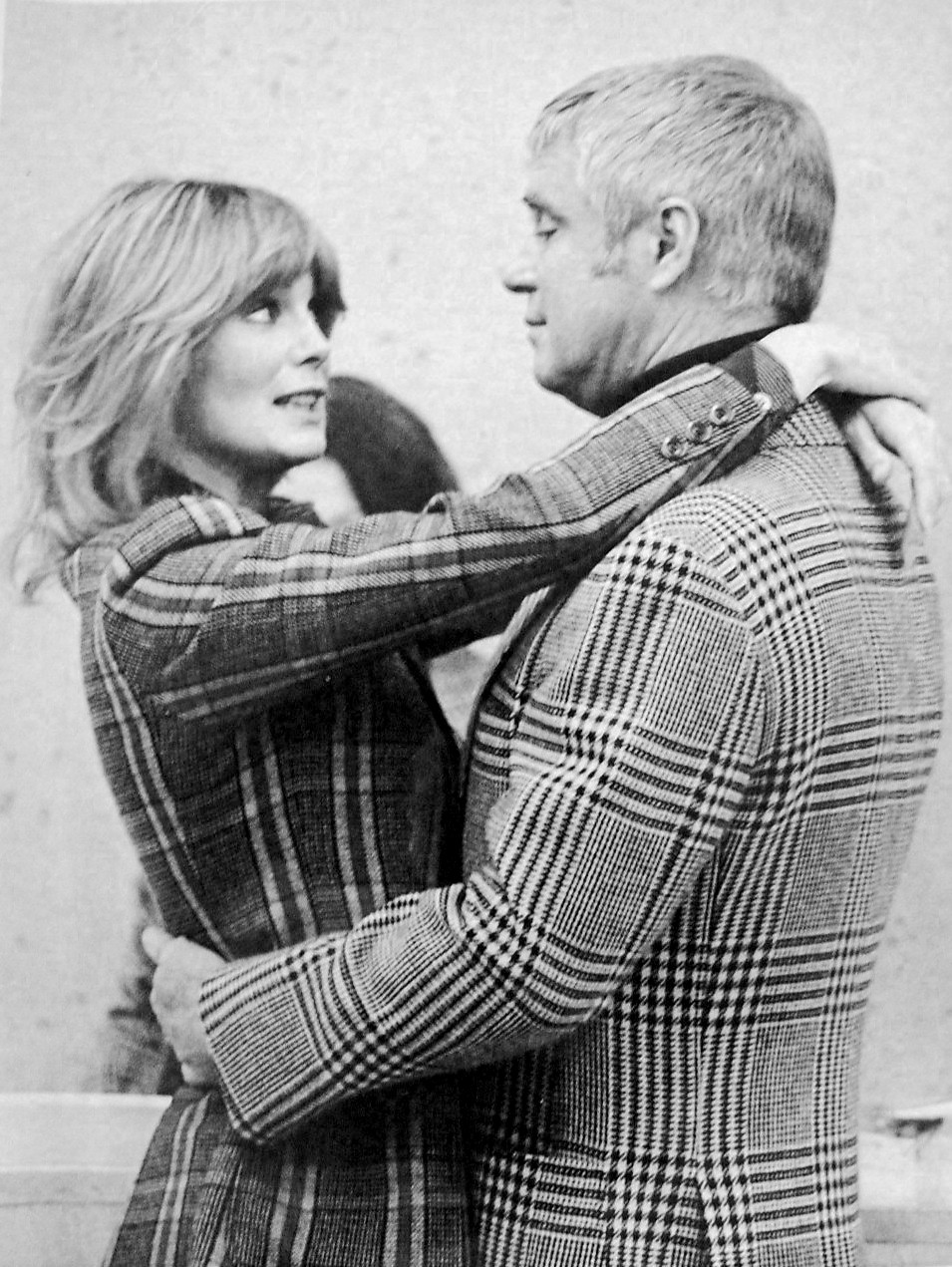
With George Peppard in Banacek, 1974

Throughout the 1970s, Evans continued to appear on television largely in guest roles. She appeared in a slew of detective shows such as The Rockford Files with James Garner, Mannix, Harry O with David Janssen, Banacek with George Peppard, McCloud with Dennis Weaver, and McMillan & Wife with Rock Hudson. In 1977, she starred with James Franciscus and Ralph Bellamy in the espionage drama series Hunter, though the show lasted for only 13 episodes.

In films, Evans co-starred with Lee Marvin and Robert Shaw in a 1979 thriller, Avalanche Express, and in 1980, she co-starred in one of Steve McQueen's final films, the Western Tom Horn.

Evans was next cast as Krystle Carrington in Aaron Spelling's opulent new primetime soap opera, Dynasty, which premiered in January 1981. Intended as ABC's answer to the hit CBS series Dallas, Dynasty featured Evans as the former secretary and new wife of millionaire oil tycoon Blake Carrington, portrayed by her former costar John Forsythe. Although initially sluggish in the ratings, audience figures improved after the show was revamped and British actress Joan Collins was brought in to play opposite Evans and Forsythe as Blake's scheming ex-wife, Alexis Carrington. By the 1984–85 season, Dynasty was the number one show on American television, outranking Dallas. Evans was later hired as a spokesperson for the beverage Crystal Light due to the similarity her character's name, Krystle.

Evans won a Golden Globe Award for Best Actress in a Television Drama Series for her Dynasty role in 1981, and was subsequently nominated every year from 1982 to 1985. She was nominated for a Primetime Emmy Award for Outstanding Lead Actress in a Drama Series in 1983. Evans won a People's Choice Award for Favorite Female Performer in a New TV Program in 1982, and for Favorite Female TV Performer in 1983, 1984, 1985, and 1986. She won a Soap Opera Digest Award for Outstanding Lead Actress in 1984 and 1985.

Evans left Dynasty in 1989, four months before the series came to an end, after only appearing in six episodes of the 22-episode ninth and final season. After leaving Dynasty, Evans semiretired from acting and made only occasional television appearances. Instead, she devoted her time to fitness issues and set up a small chain of fitness centers. In the 1990s, Evans hosted infomercials for Rejuvenique, a mask for toning facial muscles. She had previously written the Linda Evans Beauty and Exercise book in 1983. She also kept in touch with Forsythe, until he died on April 1, 2010, and she was devastated by his death. Evans first met Forsythe as an unfamiliar actress aged 18, for her first speaking part: Her agent "signed me up for Bachelor Father and John Forsythe gave me my first speaking part."

In 1991, Evans returned to the role of Krystle Carrington for the television miniseries Dynasty: The Reunion. Following this, she appeared in three made-for-TV movies in the 1990s, but then retired from screen acting altogether in 1997.

In 2005, actress Melora Hardin portrayed Evans in Dynasty: The Making of a Guilty Pleasure, a fictionalized television movie based on the creation and behind-the-scenes production of Dynasty.

In 2006, Evans reunited with her Dynasty castmates for the nonfiction reunion special Dynasty: Catfights and Caviar. She then starred in the stage play Legends opposite her former Dynasty rival Collins. In 2009, Evans appeared in and won the British TV program Hell's Kitchen, working under Michelin-starred chef Marco Pierre White.

In 2021 Evans returned to acting, taking a small role in the critically acclaimed movie Swan Song.

Evans has a star on the Hollywood Walk of Fame at 6834 Hollywood Boulevard in Hollywood, California.

== Personal life ==
In her late teens, Evans was engaged to Patrick Curtis, who later became a press agent and married Raquel Welch.

Subsequently, Evans has been married and divorced twice. Her first marriage was to actor, photographer, and film director John Derek. They started dating in 1965, married in 1968, and separated on Christmas Day 1973, when Derek disclosed his affair with 17-year old Mary Cathleen Collins (30 years his junior), who would become known as Bo Derek after they married.

Evans' second marriage was to Stan Herman, a realtor and property executive, from 1975 to 1979. She then lived with restaurant owner George Santo Pietro, from 1980 to 1984. Evans also dated The Big Valley castmate Lee Majors for a brief period following her second divorce, as well as businessmen Richard Cohen (an ex-husband of Tina Sinatra) and Dennis Stein (a former fiancé of Elizabeth Taylor) during the mid-1980s. In 1989, Evans began a relationship with new-age musician Yanni, which lasted until 1998.

Her best friend is her ex-stepdaughter, television writer Sean Catherine Derek. Her prior best friend was Bunky Young, Evans' former assistant of over 40 years, who died in 2021. She is also close with John's Europe-based second wife, actress Ursula Andress, a sometime houseguest at her home in Beverly Hills, California. She is also friendly with Bo Derek, her former romantic rival.

Evans appeared in Playboy magazine at the behest of her then-husband John Derek in 1971. As she gained fame on Dynasty, the photos were published a second time in 1982.

Idiopathic edema is an "physiopsychological syndrome of cyclic or episodic fluid retention with real or perceived swelling...occurring almost exclusively in postpubertal, premenopausal females". After being diagnosed with the condition, Evans began investigating alternative healing, delving into Eastern philosophy and naturopathy. In 1985, she became involved with controversial metaphysical teacher J. Z. Knight and her Ramtha's School of Enlightenment and eventually relocated to Rainier, Washington to be closer to Knight and her school. Evans has resided on a 70-acre (28 ha) estate that she shares with her sister, nephew and ex-stepdaughter.

Evans was arrested in May 2014 for driving under the influence of a prescription drug.

== Filmography ==
=== Film ===
Year	Title	Role	Notes
1963	Twilight of Honor	Alice Clinton	Alternative title: The Charge is Murder
1965	Those Calloways	Bridie Mellott	
1965	Beach Blanket Bingo	Sugar Kane	
1969	Childish Things	Pat Jennings	Alternative title: Confessions of Tom Harris
1974	The Klansman	Nancy Poteet	
1975	Mitchell	Greta	
1979	Avalanche Express	Elsa Lang	
1980	Tom Horn	Glendolene Kimmel	
2021	Swan Song	Rita Parker Sloan	

=== Television ===
Year	Title	Role	Notes
1960	Bachelor Father	Liz McGavin	Episode: "A Crush on Bentley"
1960–1962	The Adventures of Ozzie and Harriet	Various	5 episodes
1962	Outlaws	Daughter	Episode: "All in a Day's Work"
1962	The Untouchables	Gert Littlesmith	Episode: "The Ginnie Littlesmith Story"
1962	Buttons and Her Beaus	Buttons	Television film
1963	The Eleventh Hour	Joan Clayton	Episode: "Where Ignorant Armies Clash"
1963	The Lieutenant	Nan Hiland	Episode: "The Two Star Giant"
1964	Dr. Kildare	Student Nurse #1	Episode: "A Nickel's Worth of Prayer"
1965	Wagon Train	Martha Temple	Episode: "Herman"
1965	My Favorite Martian	Sally Farrow	Episode: "Martin's Favorite Martian"
1965–1969	The Big Valley	Audra Barkley	Series regular; 112 episodes
1973	Female Artillery	Charlotte Paxton	Television film
1973	McCloud	Geri March	Episode: "Butch Cassidy Rides Again"
1974	Banacek	Cherry Saint-Saens	Episode: "Rocket to Oblivion"
1974	Mannix	Lorna	Episode: "The Ragged Edge"
1974	Nakia	Samantha Lowell	Television film (pilot for TV series Nakia)
1974	Harry O	Marian Sawyer	Episode: "Guardian at the Gates"
1975	McMillan & Wife	Nicole Avery	Episode: "Night Train to L.A."
1975	The Rockford Files	Claire Prescott / Audrey Wyatt	Episodes: "Claire" and "The Farnsworth Stratagem"
1975	McCoy		Episode: "The Big Ripoff"
1977	Hunter	Marty Shaw	Series regular; 13 episodes
1978	Nowhere to Run	Amy Kessler	Television film
1978	Standing Tall	Jill Shasta	Television film
1981	The Fall Guy	Herself	Episode: "Colt's Angels"
1981–1984	The Love Boat	Various	7 episodes
1981–1989	Dynasty	Krystle Carrington	Series regular (seasons 1–8), recurring (season 9); 204 episodes Golden Globe Award for Best Actress – Television Series Drama (1982); People's Choice Awards for Favorite Female Performer in a New TV Program (1982); People's Choice Awards for Favorite Female TV Performer (1983–1986); Soap Opera Digest Award for Outstanding Actress in a Prime Time (1984–1985); Nominated—Golden Globe Award for Best Actress – Television Series Drama (1983–1986); Nominated—Primetime Emmy Award for Outstanding Lead Actress in a Drama Series (1983); Nominated—Soap Opera Digest Award for Favorite Super Couple: Prime Time (1986, 1989)
1982	Bare Essence	Bobbi Rowan	Television miniseries, 11 episodes
1983	Kenny Rogers as The Gambler: The Adventure Continues	Kate Muldoon	Television film
1984	Glitter	Herself	Episode: "Pilot"
1985–1986	Dynasty	Rita Lesley	Recurring role; concurrent to her contract role
1986	North and South, Book II	Rose Sinclair	Television miniseries
1986	The Last Frontier	Kate Hannon	Television miniseries Australia/US, 2 episodes
1990	She'll Take Romance	Jane McMillan	Television film
1991	Dynasty: The Reunion	Krystle Carrington	Television miniseries, 2 episodes
1991	The Gambler Returns: The Luck of the Draw	Kate Muldoon	Television film
1995	Dazzle	Sylvie Norberg Kilkullen	Television film
1997	The Stepsister	Joan Curtis Shaw Canfield	Television film
1997	European Soundmix Show	Host	
2007	Where Are They Now	Herself - Guest	TV series Australia, 1 episode
2016	The Morning Show	Herself - Guest	TV series Australia, 1 episode
2020	Das Traumschiff	Herself	Episode: "Kapstadt"
2021	Studio 10	Herself - Guest	TV series Australia, 1 episode
