= Moving On (Oleta Adams album) =

Studio album by Oleta Adams
- Released: October 23, 1995
- Studios: Palm Tree Studios (New York City, New York); United Sound Systems and Vanguard Studios (Detroit, Michigan); Cherokee Studios (Los Angeles, California); Andora Studios (Hollywood, California); Larrabee Sound Studios (North Hollywood, California); Reel Tyme Studios (Woodland Hills, California); Castle Oaks Studios (Calabasas, California)
- Genres: R&B, soul
- Length: 56:31
- Label: Fontana (Mercury)
- Producers: Michael J. Powell; Vassal Benford; Scott Mayo; Oleta Adams

Oleta Adams chronology
Evolution (1993)	Moving On (1995)	The Very Best of Oleta Adams (1996)

Singles from Moving On
- 1. "Never Knew Love" Released: September 25, 1995; 2. "Life Keeps Moving On" Released: 1995 (Netherlands); 3. "We Will Meet Again" Released: January 1996

Professional ratings
Review scores
Source	Rating
AllMusic	3/5 stars
Cash Box	(favorable)
Los Angeles Times	2/4 stars

Moving On is the fifth album by American vocalist, pianist and songwriter Oleta Adams, released in 1995. It saw Adams move towards a more straightforward R&B sound, working with established R&B producers Vassal Benford (who had produced Rebbie Jackson, Jade and Toni Braxton) and Michael J. Powell (producer of Randy Crawford, Anita Baker and Regina Belle) who helped to mix her usual soul, pop and gospel styles with R&B. Adams wrote or co-wrote six of the twelve songs on the album, and for the first time produced two of the songs.

== Singles ==
Four singles were released from the album. The lead single, "Never Knew Love", was the most R&B-sounding song on the album, and gave Adams her fourth Top 40 hit in the UK. The second single, a re-recorded and remixed song from her first album, "Rhythm of Life" (only included in some editions of the album), gave Adams her last Top 40 hit in the UK to date. The final two singles from the album, the ballads "We Will Meet Again" and "Life Keeps Moving On", performed less well.

== Commercial performance ==
The album had limited success, peaking at #59 in the UK Albums Chart and at #194 on the US Billboard 200, staying only one week on both charts. This was Adams' last charting album on both countries' main chart and the lack of commercial success led to Moving On being her last studio album released through Fontana Records.

The album was nominated for the Grammy Award for Best R&B Album at the 39th Grammy Awards.

== Track listing ==
US edition
No.	Title	Writer(s)	Producer(s)	Length
1.	"Never Knew Love"	Kathy Wakefield, Oleta Adams, Vassal Benford	Vassal Benford	3:32
2.	"Once in a Lifetime"	Wakefield, Adams, Benford	Benford	5:24
3.	"I Knew You When"	Donny Kees, Shawna Harrington-Burkhart	Michael J. Powell	4:20
4.	"You Need To Be Loved"	Adams	Oleta Adams, Scott Mayo	4:41
5.	"Slow Motion"	Ed Fox, Evan Pace	Powell	5:13
6.	"We Will Meet Again"	Allan Rich, Brenda Russell	Powell	4:47
7.	"This Is Real"	Curtiss Boone, Michael J. Powell	Powell	5:02
8.	"Life Keeps Moving On"	Adams	Benford	5:32
9.	"Long Distance Love"	Lowell George	Powell	4:15
10.	"Love Begins at Home"	Rich, Jud Friedman, Adams	Powell	4:51
11.	"If This Love Should Ever End"	Boone, Powell	Powell	4:45
12.	"New Star"	Adams	Adams, Mayo	4:17
Total length:				56:21

European edition
No.	Title	Writer(s)	Producer(s)	Length
13.	"Between Hello and Goodbye"	George Lyter, Michael O'Hara, Denise Rich	Powell	6:11
14.	"Don't Let The Sun Go Down On Me"	Elton John, Bernie Taupin	Roland Orzabal	5:53

- Note: Track 14 was originally released in 1991 on the album Two Rooms: Celebrating the Songs of Elton John & Bernie Taupin and was also released as a single, but up until the release of Moving On had never been included on an Adams album.

European reissue CD
No.	Title	Writer(s)	Length
13.	"Rhythm Of Life" (Phil Coxon Edit)	Nicky Holland, Roland Orzabal	5:17
14.	"Never Knew Love" (Phil Coxon Edit)	Wakefield, Adams, Benford	4:04

== Personnel ==
- Oleta Adams – lead vocals, backing vocals (2, 6, 8, 9), acoustic piano (3–7, 9–14), Rhodes electric piano (4, 12), keyboards (5, 6, 10, 11)
- Vassal Benford – musician (1), drum programming (1, 2), keyboards (2, 8)
- Vernon Fails – electric piano (3, 5, 6, 9–11, 13)
- Michael J. Powell – keyboards (3, 5–7, 10, 11), keyboard programming (3, 5–7, 9–11, 13), guitars (3, 5–7, 9–11, 13), percussion (3, 5–7, 9–11, 13), additional keyboards (13)
- Paul D. Allen – keyboard programming (3, 5, 6, 9–11, 13), percussion programming (3, 5, 6, 9–11, 13), drum programming (7)
- Scott Mayo – additional keyboards (4, 12), additional drum programming (4), backing vocals (4, 12), drum programming (12)
- Curtiss Boone – keyboards (7)
- Darrell Houston – organ (9)
- Simon Clark – Hammond organ (14)
- Morris O'Connor – guitars (4, 12)
- Donnie Lyle – guitars (10), acoustic guitar (13)
- Roland Orzabal – guitars (14), backing vocals (14)
- Gerald Albright – bass (2), soprano saxophone (2)
- Al Turner – bass (3, 5–7, 9–11, 13)
- Stan Sargeant – bass (4, 12), synth bass (4, 12)
- Tony Green – bass (8)
- Pino Palladino – bass (14)
- John Cushon – drum programming (1, 4), drums (2–5, 8, 9, 12, 14), cymbals (7)
- Eric White – drum programming (1, 8)
- Mario Winans – drums (6, 10, 11, 13)
- Ray Manzerolle – saxophone (5, 9)
- Paul Riser – string arrangements (3, 6, 13)
- Valerie Davis – backing vocals (1, 2, 8)
- Trina Powell – backing vocals (1, 2, 8)
- Velma "Emerald" Williams – backing vocals (1, 2, 8)
- Valerie Pinkston-Mayo – backing vocals (4, 12), BGV arrangements (4, 12)
- Mindy Stein – backing vocals (4, 12)
- Fred White – backing vocals (4, 12)
- The Ridgeway Sisters (Esther, Gloria and Gracie) – backing vocals (5, 7)
- Tamara Powell – backing vocals (8)
- Carol Kenyon – backing vocals (14)
- Tessa Niles – backing vocals (14)

Choir on "Love Begins at Home"

- Jevac Grier – chorale director
- Tanisha Butcher, Monique Butler, Pamela Clark, Antoine Davison, Jevac Grier, Renita Hamilton, Tommy Henderson, Willard Hines, Cortez Mitchell, Regina Stinson and Sharita Stovall – singers

Production

- David Bates – A&R
- Tanya Doteon – production coordinator (1)
- Stephanie McCravey – production coordinator (1)
- Mercury Art – design
- Michel Conte – photography
- Oleta Adams – liner notes
- Gallin Morey Associates – management

Technical

- Victor Flores – engineer (1, 2, 8)
- Kevin Davis – mix engineer (1, 2, 8)
- Paul D. Allen – engineer (3, 5, 6, 9–11, 13), assistant mix engineer (3, 5, 6, 10, 13), assistant engineer (7, 9, 11)
- Michael J. Powell – engineer (3, 5–7, 9–11, 13), mix engineer (3, 5–7, 9–11)
- Carl Robinson – engineer (3, 6, 11, 13)
- Gerard Smerek – engineer (3, 5–7, 9–11, 13), mix engineer (3, 5–7, 9–11, 13)
- Rick Camp – engineer (4, 12)
- Moogie Canazio – mix engineer (4, 12)
- Leonard Jones – MIDI technician (4, 12)
- Eric White – assistant engineer (1, 2, 8), second mix engineer (1, 2, 8)
- Tom Baker – second mix engineer (1, 2, 8)
- Clell Moore – second engineer (3, 5–7, 9–11, 13)
- Mike Aarvold – assistant engineer (4, 11)
- Luis Quine – assistant engineer (4, 12)

== Charts ==
Chart (1995)	Peak position
US Billboard 200	194
US Billboard Top R&B Albums	49
Dutch album chart	14
UK Albums Chart	59
