= Third Set (Oleta Adams album) =

Studio album by Oleta Adams
- Released: February 10, 2017
- Studio: Firehouse Studios (Pasadena, California); House of Blues Studio (Encino, California)
- Genre: Jazz
- Label: self-released
- Producer: Oleta Adams

Oleta Adams chronology
Let's Stay Here (2009)	Third Set (2017)

Third Set is an album by American singer, pianist, and songwriter Oleta Adams, released on February 10, 2017.

== Track listing ==
No.	Title	Writer(s)	Length
1.	"It's Alright with Me"	Cole Porter	9:02
2.	"Only The Lonely"	Sammy Cahn; Jimmy Van Heusen	7:20
3.	"Don't Interrupt the Sorrow"	Joni Mitchell	4:58
4.	"River"	Mitchell	6:36
5.	"Do I Move You"	Nina Simone	6:04
6.	"Evolution" (Acoustic)	Ivan Lins	6:00
7.	"Rhythm of Life" (Acoustic)	Roland Orzabal; Nicky Holland	3:43
8.	"Blowin' in the Wind"	Bob Dylan	6:19
9.	"Wilted Roses"	Raina Bundy	6:56
10.	"His Loving Eyes"	Oleta Angela Adams	3:47
Total length:			1:00:45

== Personnel ==
- Oleta Adams – vocals, acoustic piano, keyboards
- James Harrah – guitars
- John Peña – bass
- John Cushon – drums, cajón
- Matt O'Connor – additional percussion (3)

=== Production ===
- Oleta Adams – producer, arrangements
- Les Cooper – engineer, mixing
- Josh Lewis – second engineer
- Sadaharu Yagi – second mix engineer
- Bernie Becker – mastering at Becker Mastering
- Chevy Nash – art direction, photography, management
- Erin Edwards – graphic design assistant
- Stephen Frazier – photography
- Robert Kopchak – photography
