= All the Love (album) =

Studio album by Oleta Adams
- Released: 2002
- Studio: Wild West, Inc. (Simi Valley, California); Master Mix (Minneapolis, Minnesota); Airborne Audio Productions (Lenexa, Kansas)
- Length: 54:52
- Label: Monarch/Pioneer
- Producer: Oleta Adams; Peter Wolf; Ricky Peterson

Oleta Adams chronology
| Come Walk with Me (1997) | All the Love (2002) | Christmas Time with Oleta (2006) |

Professional ratings
Review scores
| Source | Rating |
|---|---|
| AllMusic | 4/5 stars |
| USA Today | 3/4 stars |

All the Love is an album by the American musician Oleta Adams, released in 2002. It was produced by Adams, Peter Wolf, and Ricky Peterson.

== Track listing ==
| No. | Title | Writer(s) | Producer(s) | Length |
|---|---|---|---|---|
| 1. | "Sweet Side of Life" | Peter Wolf, Michelle Wolf, Oleta Adams | Peter Wolf | 4:40 |
| 2. | "All The Love" | Adams | Ricky Peterson | 4:25 |
| 3. | "I Can't Live a Day Without You" | Connie Harrington, Ty Lacy, Joe Beck | R. Peterson | 3:49 |
| 4. | "In the Beginning" | Rob Mathes, Bob Farrell | P. Wolf | 4:53 |
| 5. | "When You Walked Into My Life" | Arnie Roman, Lacy | R. Peterson | 4:18 |
| 6. | "A Bump in the Road" | Adams | R. Peterson | 5:27 |
| 7. | "I Hope You Dance" | Mark D. Sanders, Tia Sillers | R. Peterson | 4:23 |
| 8. | "Love Was Spoken Here" | Roman, Lacy, Matkosky, Dennis Joseph | R. Peterson | 3:56 |
| 9. | "The Power of Sacrifice" | Adams | Oleta Adams, Paul Peterson | 5:19 |
| 10. | "Learning to Love You More" | Adams, Raymel Menefee | R. Peterson | 4:24 |
| 11. | "Look What Love Has Done" | Stephanie Lewis, Mathes | P. Wolf | 4:41 |
| 12. | "Just Before I Go to Sleep" | Adams, Menefee | Adams | 4:55 |
| Total length: | | | | 54:52 |

== Personnel ==
- Oleta Adams – vocals, acoustic piano (9, 12)
- Peter Wolf – keyboards (1, 11), programming (1, 4, 11)
- Ricky Peterson – keyboards (2, 3, 5–8, 10), programming (2, 3, 5–8, 10), arrangements (2, 3, 5–8, 10), backing vocals (3, 5)
- Paul Peterson – programming (3, 5–10), bass (6, 10), guitars (7)
- Paul Jackson Jr. – guitars (1, 11)
- Michael Landau – guitars (2, 3, 5, 6, 8, 10)
- Stevan Pasero – guitars (2)
- Geoff Bouchier – acoustic guitar (6)
- Larry Kimpel – bass (1, 4)
- John Cushon – drums (1, 11), percussion (1, 11)
- Gerald Albright – saxophone (1)
- Kenny Holeman – flute (6)
- Bridgette Bryant – backing vocals (1, 11)
- Sue Ann Carwell – backing vocals (1)
- Michelle Wolf – backing vocals (1, 11)
- Fred White – backing vocals (1)
- Patty Peterson – backing vocals (3, 5, 10)
- Joey Diggs – backing vocals (4)
- Jeff Pescetto – backing vocals (4)
- Debbie Duncan – backing vocals (5)

Production

- Don Boyer – executive producer
- Stevan Pasero – executive producer
- Paul Erickson – engineer (1, 4, 11)
- Don Miller – engineer
- Barry Rudolph – engineer
- Tom Tucker – engineer
- Jeff Whitworth – engineer
- Larry Gann – assistant engineer
- James Harley – assistant engineer
- Joe Lepinski – assistant engineer, digital editing
- John Paturno – assistant engineer
- Tommy Tucker Jr. – assistant engineer
- Bernie Grundman – mastering at Bernie Grundman Mastering (Hollywood, California)
- Todd Culberhouse – A&R
- Tina Carson – project coordinator
- Michael Lord – production coordinator
- Howard Arthur – music copyist
- Sue Tucker – music copyist
- Digeann Cabrell – creative director
- Ian Kawata – art direction
- Gloria Ma – graphic design
- Randee St. Nicholas – photography
- Terri Apanasewicz – hair stylist, make-up
- Kelle Kutsugeras – stylist
- Jim Morey and Chevy Nash for Morey Management Group – management
