= Christmas Time with Oleta =

Studio album by Oleta Adams
- Released: October 3, 2006
- Studio: DML Audio (Littleton, Colorado); The Booth and The Cave (Shawnee, Kansas)
- Genre: Christmas
- Length: 43:21
- Label: Koch Records
- Producer: Oleta Adams

Oleta Adams chronology
All the Love (2001)	Christmas Time with Oleta (2006)	Let's Stay Here (2009)

Professional ratings
Review scores
Source	Rating
AllMusic	4/5 stars

Christmas Time with Oleta is a holiday album by the American vocalist, pianist and songwriter Oleta Adams and was released in 2006.

== Track listing ==
No.	Title	Writer(s)	Length
1.	"Of the Father's Love Begotten/Hark the Herald"	11th-century Sanctus Trope, Felix Mendelssohn, Charles Wesley	4:02
2.	"Alleluia, Alleluia (Peace on Earth)"	Timothy Hayden, Patrice Villines	3:51
3.	"Christmas Time Is Here"	Vince Guaraldi, Lee Mendelson	4:04
4.	"I Wonder as I Wander (Appalachian Carol)"	John Jacob Niles	4:51
5.	"Breath of Heaven"	Chris Eaton, Amy Grant	5:43
6.	"Winter Wonderland"	Felix Bernard, Richard B. Smith	4:23
7.	"There's Still My Joy"	Beth Nielsen Chapman, Melissa Manchester, Matt Rollings	4:20
8.	"Let It Snow"	Sammy Cahn, Jule Styne	3:38
9.	"Have Yourself a Merry Little Christmas"	Ralph Blane, Hugh Martin	4:34
10.	"Silent Night"	Franz Xaver Gruber, Joseph Mohr	3:55
Total length:			43:21

== Personnel ==
- Oleta Adams – vocals, vocal arrangements, backing vocals (1, 2, 4), arrangements (1–5, 7–10), keyboards (1, 2, 4, 7–9), synthesizers (1, 2, 4, 8, 10), acoustic piano (3, 6), bass programming (3, 8), all instruments (5), cello arrangements (7)
- Jimmy Dykes – guitars (2, 4)
- Al Turner – bass (1, 2, 4, 9)
- John Cushon – cymbals, live drums (1–4, 6, 8, 9), percussion programming (4, 6), keyboards (6), synthesizers (6), arrangements (6)
- Ronald McFadden – alto saxophone (2, 8)
- Lonnie McFadden – trumpet (2, 8)
- Beth McCullom – cello (7)
- Greg Clark – backing vocals (1, 2, 4), vocal arrangements (2)
- Tammy Ward Clayton – backing vocals (1, 2, 4)

== Production ==
- David Wilkes – A&R direction
- Oleta Adams – producer, liner notes
- Dave Lohr – engineer, mixing
- Eric Conn – mastering at Independent Mastering (Nashville, Tennessee)
- Studio Eric Wondergem BNO (Baarn, Netherlands) – design
- Randee St. Nicholas – photography
- Chevy Nash for Engine Entertainment – management
