= Get Here =

1988 single by Brenda Russell

Single by Brenda Russell

from the album Get Here
- B-side: "Le Restaurant"
- Released: September 13, 1988
- Genre: Soul
- Length: 4:06
- Label: A&M
- Songwriter: Brenda Russell
- Producers: André Fischer; Brenda Russell; Peter O. Ekberg

Brenda Russell singles chronology
| "Gravity" (1988) | "Get Here" (1988) | "Kiss Me with the Wind" (1990) |

"Get Here" is a ballad written by American singer and songwriter Brenda Russell. The title track of her fourth studio album, Get Here (1988), it became a moderate hit on the US Billboard R&B chart after the album's successful first hit, "Piano in the Dark".

American vocalist Oleta Adams covered and released the song in 1990, reaching the top five in both the US and the UK with her version. Adams's version of "Get Here", co-produced by Roland Orzabal from the band Tears for Fears (for whom she had performed the female vocals on the hit single "Woman in Chains" a year earlier), became her signature song.

== Composition and first release ==
Brenda Russell had written the song while staying at a penthouse in Stockholm: the tune came to her as she viewed some hot air balloons floating over the city, a sight Russell recalls set her "really tripping on how many ways you can get to a person" (the eventual song's lyrics include the line: "You can make it in a big balloon but you'd better make it soon"). Although Russell did not pursue the musical ideas that came to her as her current record label saw her as a dance artist, the song was still in the singer's mind when she woke up the next day: "I don't read or write music [so] it's extraordinary if a song is still in my head that I haven't jotted down or recorded. So if it's still in my head overnight, I think that's something extra special, it's like somebody trying to tell me something." Russell recorded the song as the title cut of her 1988 album from which it was issued as a single – the album's third – reaching number 37 on the US Billboard R&B chart.

== Oleta Adams version ==
"Get Here"

Single by Oleta Adams

from the album Circle of One
- B-side: "I've Got to Sing My Song" (international); "Watch What Happens" (US)
- Released: November 1990
- Genre: Soul; gospel
- Length: 4:37
- Label: Mercury (US); Fontana (international)
- Songwriter: Brenda Russell
- Producers: Roland Orzabal; David Bascombe

Oleta Adams singles chronology
| "Circle of One" (1990) | "Get Here" (1990) | "You've Got to Give Me Room" (1991) |

Music video
- "Get Here" on YouTube

American singer-songwriter Oleta Adams released her cover of "Get Here" in November 1990 by Mercury Records, taken from her third studio album, Circle of One (1990). It was while Adams was visiting Stockholm, Sweden that she heard Russell's song playing in a record store and was sufficiently impressed with the song to record it for her album.

World events at this time gave the song a resonance as an anthem for the US troops in the Gulf War—underscored by the lyrics "You can reach me by caravan / Cross the desert like an Arab man"; Adams's single peaked at number five on the US Billboard Hot 100 in March 1991. The accompanying music video was directed by Greg Gold.

=== Critical reception ===
"Get Here" received favorable reviews from most music critics. AllMusic editor Stephen Thomas Erlewine described the song as a "gospel-tinged belter". Larry Flick from Billboard magazine remarked that "delicate instrumental arrangement contrasts with Adams' powerful reading of a lovely Brenda Russell composition." The Commercial Appeal named it a "standout" track from the album, declaring it as "magnificent". Karla Peterson from Copley News Service called it "warmhearted". A reviewer from The Daily Telegraph said it is "the Single of the week, the year, the decade..." Ellen Fagg from The Deseret News wrote that the lyrics "are creative and witty and plaintively passionate, a difficult triple combination to score. But the words are great because they're underlined by the rich power of Adams' big voice." James Bernard from Entertainment Weekly viewed it as "an unrushed call to her lover" and noted that the singer's voice "can soar with intensity, hanging onto notes for dear life, or suddenly drop into hushed intimacy."

Los Angeles Times named it "one of the year's most satisfying hit singles." David Quantick from NME wrote, "Oleta is a total groover. This is a huge soft ballad that sounds lots better than Mariah Carey and her lacewanky ilk." Stephen Holden from New York Times declared it as a "ballad of separation and longing", while Philadelphia Daily News noted it as "that come-home-safe song widely connected to our troops in the gulf war." Nick Duerden from Record Mirror wrote, "With few singers capable of matching her eloquent tones (Anita Baker excepted), 'Get Here', a wondrous three-minute love affair with the senses, is destined to scale deserving heights." Caroline Sullivan from Smash Hits labeled it as a "wistful souly ballad" from the former Tears For Fears backing singer. Tonya Pendleton from Vibe called it "anthemic".

The song was nominated for Best Female Pop Vocal Performance at the 34th Annual Grammy Awards.

=== Chart performance ===
"Get Here" reached the top five in Ireland, Luxembourg, the United Kingdom, and the United States. In the UK, the single peaked at number four on February 17, 1991, after spending seven weeks on the UK Singles Chart and topped the UK Airplay Chart. It also reached the top 30 in the Netherlands, peaking at number 27. On the Eurochart Hot 100, "Get Here" peaked at number nine in March. Outside Europe, the song became a top-10 hit in Israel and peaked at numbers 27 and five in Canada and the United States, respectively.

=== Music video ===
The music video for "Get Here" was directed by Greg Gold. It begins outside a pittoresque red wall with a blue door and window, where Adams slowly appears in front. Then she is seen sitting and playing by a piano. Other scenes shows Adams in a room with blue-green walls and a white window, or she performs while standing in a corner. As the video progresses, Adams is also seen inside the red-walled house. The video concludes with a close-up of the singer as she sings the last lines of the song, while leaning towards one of the blue-green walls. "Get Here" was later made available on Adams' official YouTube channel in 2014, having generated almost nine million views as of October 2025.

=== Track listings ===
7-inch single, Europe (1990)
| No. | Title | Length |
|---|---|---|
| 1. | "Get Here" | 4:34 |
| 2. | "I've Got to Sing My Song" (live) | 4:30 |

12-inch single, UK (1990)
| No. | Title | Length |
|---|---|---|
| 1. | "Get Here" | 4:36 |
| 2. | "I've Got to Sing My Song" (live) | 4:32 |
| 3. | "Birdland" | 3:13 |

CD single, Europe (1990)
| No. | Title | Length |
|---|---|---|
| 1. | "Get Here" | 4:36 |
| 2. | "I've Got to Sing My Song" (live) | 4:32 |
| 3. | "Birdland" | 3:13 |

=== Charts ===
==== Weekly charts ====
| Chart (1991) | Peak position |
|---|---|
| Australia (ARIA) | 151 |
| Canada Top Singles (RPM) | 27 |
| Canada Adult Contemporary (RPM) | 3 |
| Europe (Eurochart Hot 100) | 9 |
| Europe (European Hit Radio) | 12 |
| Germany (GfK) | 80 |
| Ireland (IRMA) | 4 |
| Israel (Israeli Singles Chart) | 9 |
| Italy (Musica e dischi) | 42 |
| Luxembourg (Radio Luxembourg) | 3 |
| Netherlands (Dutch Top 40) | 27 |
| Netherlands (Single Top 100) | 28 |
| New Zealand (Recorded Music NZ) | 43 |
| UK Singles (Official Charts) | 4 |
| UK Airplay (Music Week) | 1 |
| UK Dance (Music Week) | 24 |
| US Billboard Hot 100 | 5 |
| US Adult Contemporary (Billboard) | 3 |
| US Hot R&B Singles (Billboard) | 8 |
| US Cash Box Top 100 | 10 |

==== Year-end charts ====
| Chart (1991) | Position |
|---|---|
| Canada Adult Contemporary (RPM) | 46 |
| Europe (European Hit Radio) | 81 |
| UK Singles (OCC) | 48 |
| US Billboard Hot 100 | 80 |
| US Adult Contemporary (Billboard) | 16 |

=== Release history ===
| Region | Date | Format(s) | Label(s) | Ref. |
|---|---|---|---|---|
| United States | November 1990 | —N/a | Mercury | |
| Japan | January 25, 1991 | Mini-CD | Fontana | |
| Australia | February 11, 1991 | 7-inch vinyl; cassette | Fontana | |

== Other versions ==
- An uptempo cover version was released in the UK in 1993 by the dance act Q featuring Tracy Ackerman and reached number 37 in the UK.
- "Get Here" has also been recorded by many other artists including Vanessa Amorosi, Paul Anka, David Archuleta, Alexia Gardner, Salena Jones, Patti LuPone, Barbara Mandrell, Jennifer Rush, Livingston Taylor, Siti Nurhaliza, Jonalyn Viray, and Susan Wong.
- Edsilia Rombley recorded "Get Here" for her 1998 album Edsilia from which it was released as a single reaching number 88 on the Netherlands charts; previously Rombley had recorded a Dutch rendering of the song entitled "Zorg Dat Je Er Bent" which had appeared on the singer's 1997 album Thuis.
- Australian-born Irish singer Johnny Logan recorded the song as "Get Here If You Can" for his album, We All Need Love (2003).
- The Beautiful South's album Gaze included a song with the same title and, partially, similar lyrics – but reversed the theme, with Paul Heaton protesting his unwillingness to travel any distance at all for his lover.
- American singer-songwriter Bootstraps recorded a version of the song for his album Homage: Deluxe Reissue (2018).
