= Oleta Adams =

American singer and pianist (born 1953)

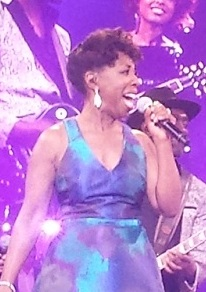
- Adams performing in 2017

Background information
- Born: Oleta Angela Adams; May 4, 1953 (age 73); Seattle, Washington, U.S.
- Genres: Gospel; soul
- Occupations: Singer; songwriter; pianist
- Instruments: Vocals; piano
- Years active: 1980–present
- Labels: Fontana; Mercury; Harmony; Monarch; Pioneer; E1
- Website: oletaadams.com

Oleta Angela Adams (born May 4, 1953) is an American singer, pianist, and songwriter. She found limited success during the early 1980s, before gaining fame via her contributions to Tears for Fears' international chart-topping album The Seeds of Love (1989). Her albums Circle of One (1991) and Evolution (1993) were top 10 hits in the UK; the former yielded a Grammy-nominated cover of Brenda Russell's "Get Here", which was a top 5 hit in both the UK and the U.S. Adams has been nominated for four Grammy Awards, as well as two Soul Train Music Awards.

== Biography ==
Oleta Angela Adams was born the daughter of a preacher and was raised listening to gospel music. In her youth, her family moved to Yakima, Washington, which is sometimes shown as her place of birth. She got her musical start in the church.

Before gaining her opportunity to perform, Adams faced a great deal of rejection. In the 1970s, she moved to Los Angeles, California, where she recorded a demo tape. However, many music executives were exclusively interested in disco music rather than Adams' preferred style.

On the advice of her singing coach, Lee Farrell, Adams moved to Kansas City, Missouri, where she did a variety of local gigs. She started her career in the early 1980s with two self-financed albums, which had limited success.

Oleta Adams sang the National Anthem prior to Game Two of the 1984 American League Championship Series.

== Collaboration with Tears for Fears ==
In June 1985, while performing at the Peppercorn Duck Club in the Hyatt Hotel in Kansas City, Adams was heard by Ian Stanley (keyboardist of the British band Tears for Fears) while they were on a two-night stopover in Kansas City midway through their "Big Chair Tour". The next night Stanley, Curt Smith and Roland Orzabal had dinner at the club where Adams was again performing, and they collectively decided that they would approach her with an offer for her to work on their next album, The Seeds of Love. Adams accepted the offer, and two years later Orzabal and Smith got in contact with her again to invite her to join the band as a singer and pianist.

In 1989, the album was released and the single "Woman in Chains", sung as a duet by Adams and Orzabal and with Manu Katche & Phil Collins on drums, became her first hit. Adams embarked on a world tour with Tears for Fears in 1990, performing by herself as the supporting artist at the start of each show, and remaining onstage throughout the Tears for Fears set where she would provide piano and vocals.

== 1990s ==
Following her work with Tears for Fears, Adams was offered a recording contract by their label, Fontana Records, and restarted her solo career in 1990. After meeting a number of producers, she worked with Roland Orzabal, who co-produced her new album, Circle of One. The album received acclaim, and eventually peaked at No. 1 in the UK Albums Chart in 1991, after she scored her biggest hit to date with a Grammy-nominated cover of Brenda Russell's "Get Here". The song reached the UK and U.S. top 5 and became popular during the 1991 Gulf War conflict, as families of deployed troops in the region embraced the tune as a theme song.

1991 also saw Adams sign to independent music publisher Fairwood Music, and contribute to the Elton John/Bernie Taupin tribute album Two Rooms, on which appeared her version of John's 1974 hit "Don't Let the Sun Go Down on Me". Adams' version became another top 40 hit in the UK.

Her next album, Evolution (1993), was also a commercial success, making the UK top 10. It also featured her self-penned adult contemporary single "Window of Hope". Her 1995 release, Moving On, saw Adams move more in the direction of R&B. She reunited with Orzabal for the duet "Me and My Big Ideas", on the Tears for Fears album, Raoul and the Kings of Spain, the same year. Two years later, she released the Christian themed album Come Walk with Me, where she received a nomination for a Grammy Award for "Holy Is the Lamb" in 1997.

In 1998, she toured as a guest vocalist on Phil Collins's Big Band Jazz Tour.

== 2000s ==
In 2001, Adams released her sixth album, All the Love, a return to an R&B/Adult contemporary sound. The album was re-released in 2004 in Germany with a different title I Can't Live a Day without You.

In 2004, Adams reunited with Tears for Fears once again as she made a surprise guest appearance onstage at their Kansas City concert, performing "Woman in Chains".

On October 3, 2006, Adams released her first Christmas album, entitled Christmas Time with Oleta.

On April 21, 2009, Adams released her eighth album entitled Let's Stay Here.

== 2010s ==
On February 10, 2017, Adams released her ninth album, her first album in eight years, entitled Third Set.

== Personal life ==
In 1994, Adams married drummer John Cushon at a United Methodist church in Kansas City, where they both taught Sunday School. They met in 1980 while working on a demo tape for Adams. Adams stated that she never had a passion to get married but on January 17, 1994 she and Cushon were involved in the Los Angeles earthquake. Adams referred to this as a sign from God that she was ready to get married.

== Discography ==
- Oleta Adams (1982)
- Going on Record (1983)
- Circle of One (1990)
- Evolution (1993)
- Moving On (1995)
- Come Walk with Me (1997)
- All the Love (2001)
- Christmas Time with Oleta (2006)
- Let's Stay Here (2009)
- Third Set (2017)

== Awards and nominations ==
Year	Result	Award	Category	Work
1991	Nominated	Soul Train Music Award	Best R&B/Urban Contemporary New Artist	—
1992	Nominated	Grammy Awards	Best Female Pop Vocal Performance	"Get Here"
1993	Nominated	Grammy Awards	Best Female R&B Vocal Performance	"Don't Let The Sun Go Down On Me"
1994	Nominated	Soul Train Music Award	Best R&B Single, Female	"I Just Had to Hear Your Voice"
1997	Nominated	Grammy Awards	Best R&B Album	Moving On
1998	Nominated	Grammy Awards	Best Contemporary Soul Gospel Album	Come Walk with Me
