= Brenda Russell discography =

This discography documents albums and singles released by American R&B/soul singer Brenda Russell.

== Studio albums ==
Year	Album	Peak chart positions			
Year	Album	US Pop	US R&B	UK	CAN
1979	Brenda Russell (A&M Records)	65	26	—	—
1981	Love Life (A&M Records)	107	42	—	—
1983	Two Eyes (Warner Bros. Records)	—	—	—	—
1988	Get Here (A&M Records)	49	20	77	65
1990	Kiss Me with the Wind (A&M Records)	—	65	—	—
1993	Soul Talkin' (EMI Records)	—	—	—	—
2000	Paris Rain (Hidden Beach Records)	—	—	—	—
2004	Between the Sun and the Moon (Dome Records/Narada Jazz)	—	96	—	—
"—" denotes releases that did not chart or were not released in that territory.

== Compilation albums ==
Year	Album
1992	Greatest Hits (A&M Records)
2001	The Ultimate Collection (Hip-O Records)
2003	So Good So Right: The Best or Brenda Russell (Dome Records)
2009	In the Thick of It: The Best of Brenda Russell (Dome Records)

== Singles ==
Year	Title	Peak chart positions						
Year	Title	US Pop	US R&B	US A/C	US A R&B	UK Pop	CAN Pop	CAN AC
1979	"So Good, So Right"	30	15	8	—	51	54	—
1979	"In the Thick of It"	—	—	—	—	51	—	—
1980	"Way Back When"	—	42	—	—	—	—	—
1981	"If You Love (The One You Lose)"	—	50	—	—	—	—	—
1983	"Two Eyes"	—	—	—	—	—	—	—
1983	"I Want Love to Find Me"	—	—	—	—	—	—	—
1988	"Piano in the Dark"	6	8	3	—	23	23	—
1988	"Gravity"	—	42	—	—	77	—	—
1988	"Get Here"	—	37	—	—	—	—	—
1989	"Le Restaurant"	—	93	—	—	—	—	—
1990	"Kiss Me with the Wind"	—	—	—	—	—	—	—
1990	"Stop Running Away"	—	34	13	—	—	65	21
1991	"Tell Me This Night Won't End" (with Gerald Alston)	—	69	—	—	—	—	—
1993	"No Time for Time"	—	—	47	—	—	—	—
2001	"Something About You"	—	—	—	40	—	—	—
2004	"I Know You by Heart"	—	—	—	36	—	—	—
"—" denotes releases that did not chart or were not released in that territory.

=== Guest singles ===
Artiste	Year	Title	US Pop	US AC	CAN Pop
Various Artists	1991	"Voices That Care"	11	6	61

=== Music videos ===
Year	Video	Director
1991	"Voices That Care" (Various Artists)	David S. Jackson
