= Baby Sister (album) =

1983 album by June Pointer

Studio album by June Pointer
- Released: June 15, 1983
- Studio: Studio 55 (Los Angeles, California); Larrabee Sound Studios (North Hollywood, California)
- Genre: R&B
- Length: 58:54
- Label: Planet
- Producer: Richard Perry

June Pointer chronology
Baby Sister (1983)	June Pointer (1989)

Professional ratings
Review scores
Source	Rating
AllMusic	2/5 stars

Baby Sister is the debut solo studio album by June Pointer, released in 1983 on the Planet label.

== History ==
The album was the debut solo album by June Pointer, as still a member of the Pointer Sisters, and the album featured contribution from her sisters Anita and Ruth. The Norman Whitfield–composed "Ready for Some Action" reached No. 28 on the R&B singles chart. It was quoted by author Steven Vass, that, "It was a middling connection of pop songs, ballads, and 1960s retro, and business was disappointingly slow".

== Track listing ==
Side one
No.	Title	Writer(s)	Length
1.	"Ready for Some Action"	Norman Whitfield	5:59
2.	"I Will Understand"	Ben Elliott, Burt Conrad, John Barnes	4:32
3.	"To You, My Love"	Tom Bahler	4:26
4.	"New Love, True Love"	Anita Pointer, June Pointer, Trevor Lawrence	4:23

Side two
No.	Title	Writer(s)	Length
5.	"I'm Ready for Love"	Holland–Dozier–Holland	3:58
6.	"You Can Do It"	Evie Sands, Richard Germinaro, Ben Weisman	4:32
7.	"Always"	David Batteau, Moon Calhoun*, Scott Shelley	3:50
8.	"My Blues Have Gone"	Kim Beacon	4:25
9.	"Don't Mess with Bill"	William "Smokey" Robinson	3:07

== Personnel ==
Adapted from liner notes.

- June Pointer – lead vocals (1–7, 9), backing vocals (2, 4, 5, 9), vocals (8)
- John Barnes – Fender Rhodes (1), synthesizers (1, 2), keyboards (2–6, 8, 9), arrangements (2), Prophet-5 (5)
- Michael Nash – synthesizers (1)
- Derek Nakamoto – synthesizers (2)
- Greg Phillinganes – synth solo (3, 4), synthesizers (7)
- Ian Underwood – synthesizers (3)
- Michael Boddicker – synthesizer programming (3, 4, 7), synthesizers (5, 6)
- Robbie Buchanan – synthesizers (4)
- Ed Walsh – synthesizers (4, 5, 8)
- Randy Waldman – keyboards (7)
- William "Smitty" Smith – organ (9)
- Howie Rice – lead guitar (1)
- George Doering – guitars (1, 2, 5)
- Tim May – guitars (1–4, 6, 8, 9)
- Paul Jackson Jr. – guitars (3, 4, 6–9)
- Lee Ritenour – guitars (5), guitar solo (8)
- Ira Newborn – guitars (7)
- Nathan East – bass
- John Robinson – drums
- Paulinho da Costa – percussion (1, 3, 4, 6–9)
- Norman Whitfield – finger snaps (1)
- Dan Marfisi – percussion (2)
- Victor Feldman – vibraphone (9)
- Gene Page – string arrangements (1, 5)
- Trevor Lawrence – horn arrangements (3, 6, 8, 9), woodwind arrangements (3), tenor sax solo (5, 6)
- Gary Herbig – reeds (6, 8, 9)
- Jim Horn – reeds (6, 8, 9)
- Dick Hyde – trombone (6, 8, 9)
- Chuck Findley – trumpet (6, 8, 9)
- Gary Grant – trumpet (6, 8, o)
- Merry Clayton – backing vocals (1)
- Clydie King – backing vocals (1)
- Julia Tillman Waters – backing vocals (1, 4, 9)
- Marva Holcolm – backing vocals (2)
- James Ingram – backing vocals (3, 7)
- Phillip Ingram – backing vocals (3, 7)
- Phil Perry – backing vocals (3, 7)
- Clydene Jackson – backing vocals (4, 9)
- Anita Pointer – backing vocals (4, 5, 9)
- Ruth Pointer – backing vocals (4, 5, 7, 9)
- Maxine Willard Waters – backing vocals (4, 9)
- Jim Gilstrap – backing vocals (5, 6)
- Lisa Roberts – backing vocals (5, 6)
- Stephanie Spruill – backing vocals (5, 6)

=== Production ===
- Richard Perry – producer
- Norman Whitfield – co-producer (1)
- Gabe Veltri – recording, remix assistant
- Humberto Gatica – remixing (1, 2, 5)
- Bill Schnee – remixing (3, 4, 6–9)
- Bobby Gerber – second engineer
- Michael Brooks – assistant engineer
- David Dubow – assistant engineer
- Stuart Furusho – assistant engineer
- Stephen Marcussen – mastering at Precision Lacquer (Hollywood, California)
- Susan Epstein – production coordinator
- Bradford Rosenberger – production coordinator
- Eddie Choran – music coordinator
- Peggy Sandvig – music preparation
- John Kosh – art direction, design
- Dick Zimmerman – photography
