= June Pointer (album) =

1989 album by June Pointer

Studio album by June Pointer
- Released: June 29, 1989
- Studios: Oakshire Recorders, Westlake Studios, Rhett Lawrence Studios and Lion Share Studios (Los Angeles, California); Zebra Studio (Studio City, California); Conway Studios, Ocean Way Recording and Elumba Studios (Hollywood, California); Ground Control Studios (Santa Monica, California); Tarpan Studios (San Rafael, California); Chartmaker Studios (Malibu, California); Marathon Studios (New York City, New York)
- Genre: R&B
- Length: 58:54
- Label: Columbia
- Producers: Rhett Lawrence; Narada Michael Walden; Burt Bacharach; Carole Bayer Sager; David Foster; Humberto Gatica; Phil Ramone; Kashif

June Pointer chronology
Baby Sister (1983)	June Pointer (1989)

June Pointer is the second and final solo studio album by June Pointer, released in 1989 on the Columbia label. The album officially marked the final solo album released by Pointer before her death in 2006.

== History ==
The album was Pointer's second studio album without the Pointer Sisters and her only album with Columbia Records, featuring contribution from producers Narada Michael Walden, David Foster, Dann Huff, Renee Geyer, Jason Scheff, and Randy Waldman. Carol Bayer Sager served as an executive producer on the album. The album yielded a hit with "Tight on Time (I'll Fit U In)", which peaked at No. 35 as a dance hit on the Dance Club Songs as a Top 40. It also peaked at No. 70 on the Hot R&B/Hip-Hop Songs chart. The album also featured "Keeper of the Flame", featuring backing vocals by Irene Cara. It also featured the Sager, Bruce Roberts and Burt Bacharach composition "Why Can't We Be Together".

== Reception ==
Professional ratings
Review scores
Source	Rating
AllMusic	2/5 stars

Justin Kantor of AllMusic gave it 2 out of 5 stars stating, "Weak material is the primary downfall of this disappointing sophomore solo effort by June Pointer.".

== Track listing ==
Side one
No.	Title	Writer(s)	Length
1.	"Tight on Time (I'll Fit U In)"	Dean Pitchford, Rhett Lawrence	4:00
2.	"Parlez Moi D'Amour (Let's Talk About Love)"	Narada Michael Walden, Preston Glass, Bobby Long	4:38
3.	"Why Can't We Be Together"	Bruce Roberts, Burt Bacharach, Carole Bayer Sager	4:34
4.	"How Long (Don't Make Me Wait)"	Carole Bayer Sager, David Foster, Tom Keane	4:21
5.	"Put Your Dreams Where Your Heart Is"	Dorothy Sea Gazeley, Gerry Stober	4:57

Side two
No.	Title	Writer(s)	Length
6.	"Keeper of the Flame"	Gordon Grody, Mary Lee Kortes	4:50
7.	"Love Calling"	Richard Feldman, Stan Lynch	3:36
8.	"Fool for Love"	Carl Sturken, Evan Rogers	4:35
9.	"Live with Me"	Dwania Kyles, Kashif, Ralph Schuckett	5:35
10.	"Love on the Line"	Carl Sturken, Evan Rogers	5:10

== Personnel ==
Adapted from liner notes.

- June Pointer – lead vocals (1, 4, 6, 8–10), backing vocals (1, 4, 8, 9), vocals (2, 3, 5, 7)
- Rhett Lawrence – keyboards (1), Fairlight CMI (1), bass (1), drums (1), synthesizer programming (4), Fairlight drums (4, 7), Fairlight programming (5)
- Walter Afanasieff – keyboards (2), synthesizers (2)
- Preston Glass – keyboards (2), bass programming (2)
- Randy Kerber – keyboards (3), Yamaha DX7 with MIDI (3)
- Larry Williams – synthesizers (3), keyboards (9)
- David Foster – keyboards (4), backing vocals (4)
- Tom Keane – keyboards (4, 5), synthesizers (5, 7), backing vocals (5), synth bass (7)
- Rick Bowen – synthesizer programming (4)
- Michael Boddicker – synthesizer programming (5)
- Randy Waldman – keyboards (6)
- Kashif – keyboards (8, 10), synthesizers (8, 10), bass (8, 10), drums (8, 10), percussion (8, 10), backing vocals (8, 10), all other instruments (9)
- Carl Sturken – additional keyboards (8, 10), guitars (10)
- Gregg Mangiafico – additional keyboards (10)
- Corrado Rustici – Jackson MIDI guitar solo (2)
- Dann Huff – guitars (3, 9)
- Michael Landau – guitars (4–7)
- Ira Siegel – guitars (8)
- Neil Stubenhaus – bass (3)
- Greg "Gigi" Gonaway – Simmons drums (2), cymbals (2)
- Narada Michael Walden – drum programming (2)
- Jeff Porcaro – drums (3, 5, 7)
- John Keane – drums (4), percussion (4), Fairlight drums (7)
- David Reitzas – cymbal overdubs (4)
- Lenny Castro – percussion (3)
- Michael Fisher – percussion (6)
- Dan Higgins – saxophones (4)
- Bill Reichenbach Jr. – trombone (4)
- Gary Grant – trumpet (4)
- Jerry Hey – trumpet (4)
- Kimberly Brewer – backing vocals (1)
- Dave Sholin – backing vocals (1), DJ (1)
- Kitty Beethoven – backing vocals (2)
- Phil Perry – vocals (3)
- Ruth Pointer – backing vocals (4, 9)
- Jason Scheff – backing vocals (5)
- Irene Cara – backing vocals (6)
- Gordon Grody – backing vocals (6)
- Mary Lee Kortes – backing vocals (6)
- David Lasley – backing vocals (6)
- Renée Geyer – backing vocals (7)
- Cindy Mizelle – backing vocals (8, 10)
- Evan Rogers – backing vocals (8, 10)
- Sandra St. Victor – backing vocals (8, 10)
- Audrey Wheeler – backing vocals (8, 10)
- The Promise – additional backing vocals (8, 10), backing vocals (9)

Music arrangements

- Rhett Lawrence – arrangements (1)
- Narada Michael Walden – arrangements (2)
- David Foster – horn arrangements (4)
- Jerry Hey – horn arrangements (4)
- Tom Keane – arrangements (5, 7)
- Randy Waldman – arrangements (6)
- Kashif – arrangements (8–10)
- Carl Sturken – arrangements (10)

== Production ==
- Carole Bayer Sager – executive producer, producer (3)
- Rhett Lawrence – producer (1)
- Narada Michael Walden – producer (2)
- Burt Bacharach – producer (3)
- David Foster – producer (4)
- Humberto Gatica – producer (5, 7)
- Phil Ramone – producer (6)
- Kashif – producer (8–10)
- Frank DeCaro – production coordinator (3)
- Chris Earthy – production coordinator (4)
- Angela Bland – production coordinator (5, 7)
- Suzanne Marie Edgren – production coordinator (6)
- Adrian Salley – production coordinator (8, 10)
- Russell Sidelsky – production coordinator (8, 10)
- David Coleman – art direction
- Nancy Donald – art direction
- Randee St. Nicholas – photography
- Jackie Arthur – wardrobe
- Marilyn Vance – wardrobe
- La'Nette LaFrance – hair
- Roberto Leon – hair
- Rudy Calvo – make-up
- Dorothy Rodriguez – manicurist
- William O. Whitmore – management
- Melissa Z. Wallace – management

Technical credits

- Bernie Grundman – mastering at Bernie Grundman Mastering (Hollywood, California)
- Jon Gass – engineer (1), mixing (1)
- Rhett Lawrence – engineer (1), additional engineer (5), assistant engineer (5)
- David Frazer – recording (2), mixing (2)
- Matt Forger – vocal engineer (2)
- Mick Guzauski – recording (3), mixing (3), final mix (6)
- Tommy Vicari – mixing (4)
- Humberto Gatica – engineer (5, 7), mixing (5, 7)
- Darren Klein – engineer (6)
- Doug Scarf – engineer (6)
- Gary Wagner – engineer (6)
- Bob Brockmann – engineer (8–10)
- Kirk Upper – engineer (8–10), mixing (8–10)
- Jeffrey "Woody" Woodruff – additional recording (3), engineer (4)
- David Reitzas – additional recording assistant (3), assistant engineer (4)
- Larry Fergusson – additional engineer (9)
- Jessie Kanner – additional engineer (9), assistant engineer (9)
- Donnell Sullivan – assistant engineer (1)
- Dana Jon Chappelle – assistant engineer (2)
- Mark Hagen – assistant engineer (2)
- Gordon Lyon – assistant engineer (2)
- Clark Germain – recording assistant (3), assistant engineer (6)
- Richard McKernan – mix assistant (3)
- Marnie Riley – mix assistant (3), assistant engineer (6)
- Karl Gruenewald – assistant engineer (5, 7)
- Mauricio Guerrero – assistant engineer (5, 7), mix assistant (5, 7)
- Laura Livingston – assistant engineer (5, 7)
- Ray Pyle – assistant engineer (5, 7, 9), mix assistant (5, 7)
- Quintin Kettere – assistant engineer (8, 10)
- Frank Nogueras – assistant engineer (8, 10)
- Ernie Perez – assistant engineer (8)
- Sylvia Massey – assistant engineer (9)
