= Pulse (Greg Phillinganes album) =

Studio album by Greg Phillinganes
- Released: February 1985
- Recorded: Studio 55, The Room, Bodifications, The Music Grinder (Los Angeles)
- Genres: Dance-pop, soul, R&B, electronic
- Length: 43:05
- Label: Planet
- Producer: Richard Perry

Greg Phillinganes chronology
Significant Gains (1981)	Pulse (1985)

Singles from Pulse
- 1. "Behind The Mask" Released: 1985

Pulse is the second solo album by American session keyboardist Greg Phillinganes, released in February 1985. The album includes Phillinganes' best-known solo song, a cover of "Behind the Mask" by Yellow Magic Orchestra arranged by Michael Jackson.

The track "Countdown to Love" was also featured in the 1984 film Streets of Fire, while both "Playin' with Fire" and "Signals" would later appear in the 1986 film Touch and Go. More recently, "Behind the Mask" was used for a montage in the sixth episode of the Max Original Series Fired on Mars (2023).

== Track listing ==
1. "Behind the Mask" (Ryuichi Sakamoto, Chris Mosdell; arr. Michael Jackson) (4:48)
2. "Won't Be Long Now" (Robbie Nevil, Mark Mueller) (5:05)
3. "Playin' With Fire" (Jackie Jackson, Pamela Phillips-Oland, Jack Wargo) (4:46)
4. "I Have Dreamed" (Richard Rodgers, Oscar Hammerstein II) (4:39)
5. "Come As You Are" (Brock Walsh, Nevil) (4:18)
6. "Lazy Nina" (Donald Fagen) (5:25)
7. "Signals" (Richard Page, John Lang, Greg Phillinganes, Nathan East) (5:00)
8. "Countdown To Love" (Kenny Vance, Marty Kupersmith) (2:56)
9. "Shake It" (Anthony Marinelli, Share Stallings, Brian Banks) (6:08)

== Personnel ==
- Greg Phillinganes – lead vocals, backing vocals, keyboards, synthesizers, claps (6), arranger

=== Additional musicians ===
- Anthony Marinelli – synthesizers, Synclavier programming (1, 2, 4, 9), producer (9), engineer (9)
- Brian Banks – synthesizers, Synclavier programming (1, 2, 4, 9), producer (9), engineer (9)
- Michael Boddicker – vocoder (1), synthesizer (3), synthesizer programming (6)
- Bo Tomlyn – synthesizer programming (3, 7)
- Howie Rice – synthesizer (8), clap effects (1), arranger (8)
- David Williams – guitars (1)
- Robbie Nevil – guitars (2, 5), arranger (2, 5)
- Carlos Rios – guitar (3)
- Dennis Herring – guitar (8)
- Nathan East – bass guitar (7)
- Carlos Vega – drums (3)
- John Robinson – drums (6), percussion (4)
- Paulinho da Costa – percussion (2, 5, 7)
- Jerry Hey – horns (3), arranger (3)
- Richard Page – backing vocals (1, 7)
- Steve George – backing vocals (7)
- The Pointer Sisters – backing vocals (2)
- James Ingram – backing vocals (3)
- Phillip Ingram – backing vocals (3)
- Howard Hewett – backing vocals (3)
- Julia Tillman – backing vocals (5)
- Maxine Willard – backing vocals (5)
- Clydene Jackson – backing vocals (5)
- Phil Perry – backing vocals (6)
- Maxi Anderson – backing vocals (6)
- Darryl Phinnessee – backing vocals (6, 9)
- Gwen Matthews – backing vocals (6)
- Cherron Taylor-Phillinganes – claps (6)
- Shyra Mason – claps (6)
- Howard Dresden – claps (6)
- Michael Jackson – arranger (1)
- Jackie Jackson – arranger (3)
- Donald Fagen – arranger (6)
- Brock Walsh – associate producer (5)

=== Technical ===
- John Arrias – engineering (1, 8)
- John Vigran – engineering (1, 3, 4, 6)
- Gary Skardina – engineering (3)
- Roger Paglia – engineering (3, 8)
- Alex Schmoll – engineering (3)
- Bert Battaglia – engineering (5)
- Jeremy Smith – engineering (6)

=== Production ===
- Produced by Richard Perry
- Engineered by Michael Brooks
- Assistant engineers – Greg Holguin, Bob Loftus, and Alex Schmoll
- Remix engineers – Bill Schnee, Michael Brooks, John Arrias, and Lew Hahn
- Mastering engineer – Stephen Marcussen
