= Love Season =

Album by Alex Bugnon

Studio album by Alex Bugnon
- Released: 1988
- Studio: Presence Studios (East Haven, Connecticut); Unique Studios (New York City, New York); 39th Street Music Studio (Midtown Manhattan, New York); Rawlston Recording Studio (Brooklyn, New York)
- Genre: Smooth jazz
- Length: 42:43
- Label: Orpheus
- Producer: Beau Huggins (exec.); Rahni Song; Poogie Bell; Victor Bailey; Alex Bugnon (co.)

Alex Bugnon chronology
Love Season (1988)	Head Over Heels (1990)

Singles from Love Season
- 1. "Piano in the Dark" Released: 1988; 2. "Going Out" Released: 1989; 3. "Yearning for Your Love" Released: 1989

Professional ratings
Review scores
Source	Rating
AllMusic	2/5 stars

Love Season is the debut studio album by jazz pianist Alex Bugnon. It was released in 1988 through Orpheus Records. Recording sessions took place at Presence Studios in East Haven, Connecticut, at Unique Studios, 39th Street Music Studio and Rawlston Recording Studio in New York City. The production was handled by Rahni Song, Poogie Bell and Victor Bailey with executive producer Beau Huggins. The album spawned three singles: "Piano in the Dark", "Going Out" and "Yearning for Your Love".

The album peaked at number 127 on the Billboard 200 and at number 34 on the Top R&B/Hip-Hop Albums chart in the United States. Its singles "Going Out" and "Yearning for Your Love" made it to No. 83 and No. 85, respectively, on the Hot R&B/Hip-Hop Songs chart. Alex Bugnon received a nomination for Soul Train Music Award for Best Jazz Album in 1990 Soul Train Music Awards, but lost to Quincy Jones' Back on the Block.

== Track listing ==
No.	Title	Writer(s)	Producer(s)	Length
1.	"Going Out"	Alex Bugnon; Charles "Poogie" Bell; Victor Bailey	Poogie Bell; Victor Bailey; Alex Bugnon (co.)	4:59
2.	"Piano in the Dark"	Brenda Russell; Jeff Hull; Scott Cutler	Rahni Song; LaVerne Blair (ass.)	5:30
3.	"Around 12:15 Am"	Alex Bugnon; Rahni P. Harris, Jr.	Rahni Song; LaVerne Blair (ass.)	4:52
4.	"Love Season"	Alex Bugnon	Rahni Song; LaVerne Blair (ass.)	6:16
5.	"Yearning for Your Love"	Oliver Scott; Ronnie Wilson	Poogie Bell; Victor Bailey; Alex Bugnon (co.)	5:57
6.	"Falling for You"	Alex Bugnon	Rahni Song; LaVerne Blair (ass.)	4:42
7.	"Time Is Running Out"	Alex Bugnon	Rahni Song; LaVerne Blair (ass.)	5:43
8.	"Magie Noire"	Alex Bugnon	Poogie Bell; Victor Bailey; Alex Bugnon (co.)	4:44
Total length:				42:43

Notes

- Track 2 is a cover of "Piano in the Dark" originally recorded by Brenda Russell
- Track 5 is a cover of "Yearning for Your Love" originally recorded by the Gap Band

== Personnel ==
- Alex Bugnon – main artist, keyboards, synthesizer, synth bass, Yamaha grand piano, Fairlight drums, arranger, co-producer
- Kysia Bostic – backing vocals
- Rahni P. Harris Jr. – backing vocals, electric bass, horns, percussion, koto, Fairlight programming, additional synthesizer, producer, engineering, arranger
- Victor Bailey – backing vocals, bass, arranger, producer
- Mark Ledford – backing vocals, trumpet, arranger
- Keith Robinson – guitar
- Michael ''Dino'' Campbell – guitar
- Charles "Poogie" Bell – drum programming, percussion, arranger, producer
- Randy Hutchinson – arranger
- LaVerne Blair – assistant producer
- Beau Huggins – executive producer
- Claude Achille – engineering
- Michael Finlayson – engineering
- Kurt Upper – mixing
- Mike Allaire – mixing
- Jack Skinner – mastering
- Henry Marquez – art direction
- Lu Ann Graffeo – design
- Robert Cohen – photography

== Charts ==
Chart (1989)	Peak position
US Billboard 200	127
US Top R&B/Hip-Hop Albums (Billboard)	34
