= Soul Talk =

Soul Talk may refer to:

- Soul Talk (Johnny "Hammond" Smith album), 1969
- Soul Talk (Leo Wright album), recorded in 1963 and released in 1970

== See also ==
- Soul Talkin', a 1993 album by Brenda Russell
