= Two eyes =

Two Eyes or two eyes may refer to:

- two eyes
- Two eyes, life and death in the game Go
- Binocular vision

== Music ==
=== Albums ===
- Two Eyes, the third studio album by the American singer/songwriter Brenda Russell
- Two Eyes EP Pomegranates (band)

=== Songs ===
- "Two Eyes" song by Brenda Russell composed by Brenda Russell from Two Eyes
- "Two Eyes", song by Tommy Steele And The Steelmen on the "Butterfingers" EP, Decca 1958
- Two Eyes (Do Naina) single with Daler Mehndi Chris Constantinou 2007
- "Dos Ojos" (Two eyes) Teen Angels

== See also ==
- Two Evil Eyes, a horror film
