= Bugnon =

Bugnon may refer to:

== Surname ==
- Alex Bugnon (1958-), jazz pianist
- André Bugnon (1947-), Swiss politician

== Places ==
- Bugnon, the site where the campus of the University Hospital of Lausanne and several buildings of the Faculty of Biology and Medicine of the University of Lausanne are located
- Gymnase cantonal du Bugnon, a high school in Lausanne
