= The Tiaras =

Canadian soul group

Background information
- Origin: Toronto, Ontario, Canada
- Genre: Soul
- Years active: 1963–1969
- Labels: Barry; Op-Art
- Past members: Brenda Russell; Jackie Richardson; Colina Phillips; Arlene Trotman

The Tiaras were a Canadian soul group from Toronto, Ontario, comprising Brenda Russell, Jackie Richardson, Colina Phillips, and Arlene Trotman. The group was formed in the mid-1960s by composer, producer, and musician Al Rain who wrote their singles. He also wrote for Grant Smith & The Power, the Allen Sisters and Pat Hervey, and composed the theme song "Travellin' Man" from "The Tommy Hunter Show". The group released two 7" singles, "Where Does All the Time Go" b/w "All I Ever Need Is You" and "Foolish Girl" b/w "Surprise". The Tiaras also provided backing vocals for acts such as Grant Smith & The Power, Pat Hervey, and The Allen Sisters. "Where Does All the Time Go" attracted the attention of Billboard, who featured the single in its March 28, 1968 issue. The following year, the group disbanded; Russell later became a Grammy Award-nominated singer-songwriter, while Richardson became a prominent singer-actress.
