= Jackie Richardson =

Canadian actor and singer

Jackie Richardson CM
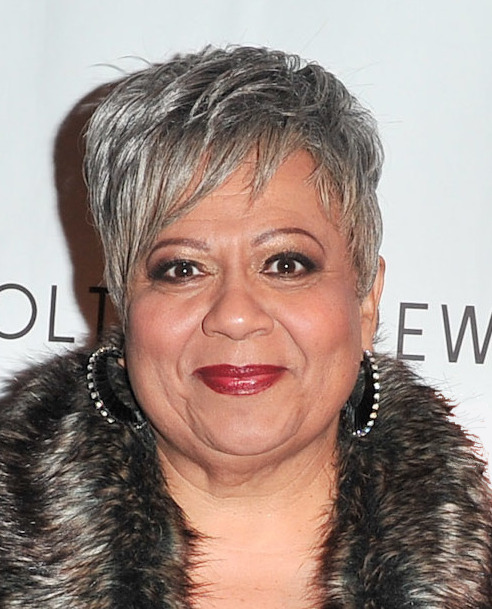
- Richardson in 2012

Background information
- Born: January 4, 1947 (age 79); Donora, Pennsylvania, U.S.
- Origin: Toronto, Ontario, Canada
- Genres: Vocal jazz
- Occupations: Singer, actress
- Years active: 1963–present

Jackie Richardson CM (born January 4, 1947) is an American and Canadian singer and actress. Richardson is known for her screen roles in Turning to Stone, The Gospel According to the Blues, The Doodlebops, and Sins of the Father. She is also known for her appearance on the YTV show Catwalk where she played the grandmother to Atlas (Christopher Lee Clements).

== Early life ==
Richardson was born in Donora, Pennsylvania in 1947, and is of African-American descent. In 1954, Richardson moved with her family to Toronto.

== Career ==
Richardson was a member of 1960s Toronto-based girl group The Tiaras along with Brenda Russell, Arlene Trotman, and Colina Phillips.

Richardson is a three-time nominee for the Academy of Canadian Cinema and Television Gemini Award, and won the Gemini Award for Best Performance by an Actress in a Leading Role in a Dramatic Program or Mini-Series for The Gospel According to the Blues. In 2003 she was nominated for the NAACP Image Award for Best Actress in a Television Movie for Sins of the Father. Richardson is also a noted stage performer, winning a Dora Award in 2004 for the musical Cookin' at the Cookery. Other high-profile projects include Milk and Honey, More Tales of the City, Further Tales of the City, Hey Lady! and 3 Men and a Baby.

The musical Big Mama! The Willie Mae Thornton Story was conceived of and written by Audrei-Kairen Kotaska for Richardson, who starred in the production first in 1999 and then again in 2012.

She also appeared as a vocalist on the 2009 music album Norm Amadio and Friends, featuring other vocalists such as Marc Jordan.

In 2017, Richardson won the Martin Luther King Jr. Achievement Award for her theater and music achievements.

== Personal life ==
Her daughter, Kim Richardson, is also a singer.

== Filmography ==
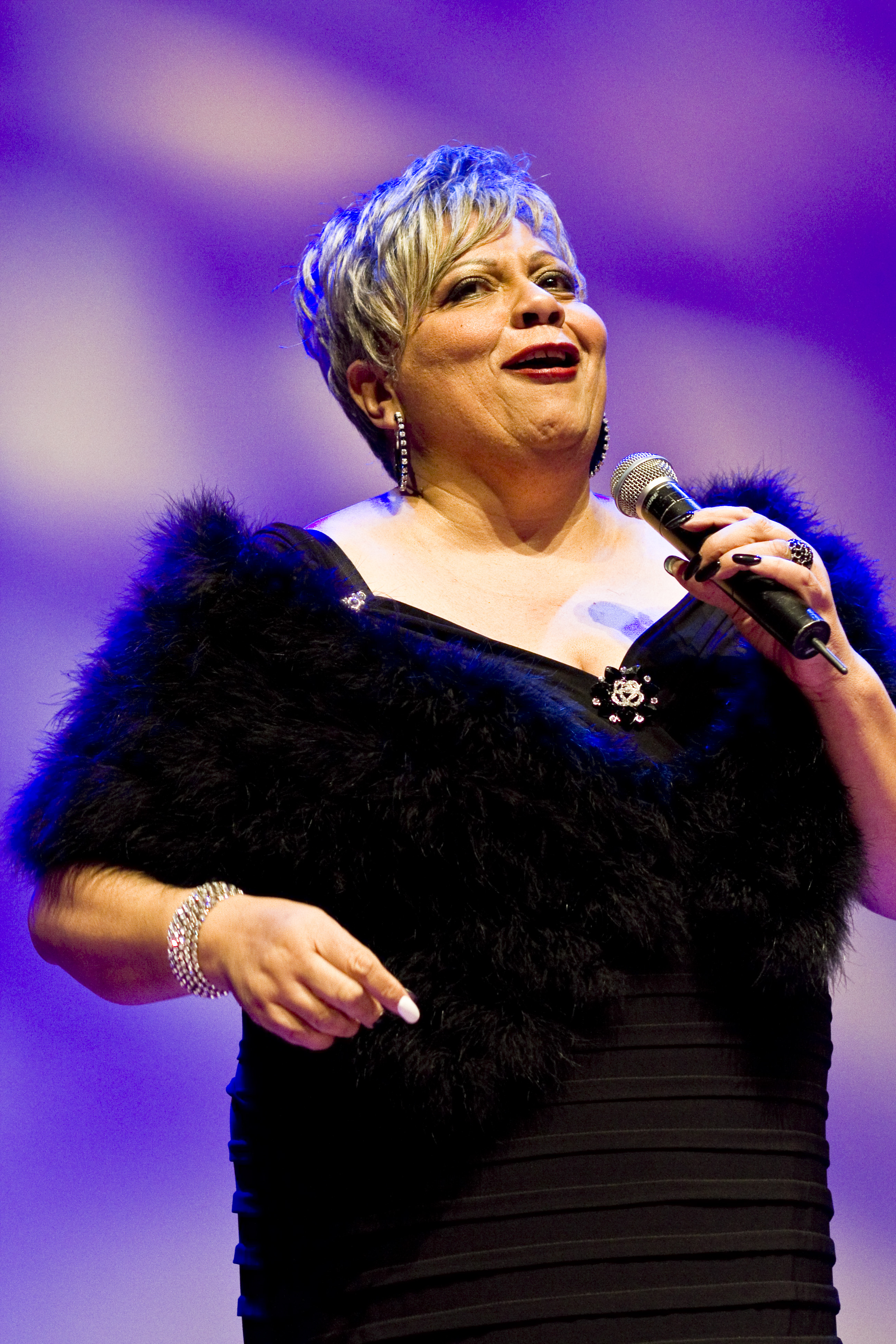
Jackie Richardson in February, 2012

=== Film ===
Year	Title	Role	Notes
1987	Three Men and a Baby	Edna	
1987	Taking Care	Carol	
1988	Switching Channels	Abigail	
1988	Dreams Beyond Memory	Nurse	
1994	Car 54, Where Are You?	Madam	
1996	Harriet the Spy	Janie's Mother	
1996	Maximum Risk	Large Woman	
1996	Extreme Measures	Triphase Nurse	
1997	Critical Care	Mrs. Steckler	
1999	Woman Wanted	Lydia	
1999	The Wishing Tree	Marianne Brooks	
2001	On Their Knees	Mother	
2004	Welcome to Mooseport	Martha	
2024	Don’t Mess with Grandma	Grandma	

=== Television ===
Year	Title	Role	Notes
1985	Turning to Stone	Dunky	Television film
1986	John Grin's Christmas	Mrs. Alcott	Television film
1987	Nightstick	Woman Singing	Television film
1987, 1992	Street Legal	Evelyn Fischer / Joanne	2 episodes
1988	War of the Worlds	Blanche	Episode: "A Multitude of Idols"
1988	T. and T.	Aunt Martha Robinson	26 episodes
1989	Glory! Glory!	Bessie	Television film
1989	Inside Stories		Episode: "Gracie"
1989	Friday the 13th: The Series	Frances	Episode: "Hate on Your Dial"
1989	Katts and Dog	Mrs. Chan	Episode: "Double Exposure"
1990	Kaleidoscope	Social Worker	Television film
1990	E.N.G.	Jenny	Episode: "Striking Out"
1991	The Hidden Room	Black Woman	Episode: "Taking Back the Night"
1991	In the Nick of Time	Nurse	Television film
1992	The Broken Cord	Black Mother	Television film
1992	Quiet Killer	Pauline Styles	Television film
1992	Forever Knight	Blood Bank Nurse	Episode: "Dark Knight"
1992–1993	Catwalk	Aunt Ellen	9 episodes
1994	RoboCop	Bea	3 episodes
1994	Getting Gotti	Juror No. 1	Television film
1994	Harlequin: Another Woman	Anna	Television film
1994	Due South	Receptionist	Episode: "A Cop, a Mountie, and a Baby"
1994, 1997	The Adventures of Dudley the Dragon	Various roles	2 episodes
1995	Degree of Guilt	Mrs. Velez	Television film
1996	Lives of Girls & Women	Baptist Singer	Television film
1996	Road to Avonlea	Megget Lydie	Episode: "Return to Me"
1996	Mr. and Mrs. Loving	Mama Jeter	Television film
1996	Her Desperate Choice	Frances	Television film
1996	Under the Piano	Mrs. Syms	Television film
1996	Traders	Principal	Episode: "High Flyer Down"
1997	Fast Track	Gospel Singer #1	Episode: "Lap of Faith"
1997	Color of Justice	Judge Winslow	Television film
1998	More Tales of the City	Emma	3 episodes
1998	Free of Eden	Ela	Television film
1998	The Famous Jett Jackson	Mrs. Darden	Episode: "Who's the Man"
1998	Mr. Music	Rhonda Grace	Television film
1999	The Love Letter	Ella	Television film
1999	Dangerous Evidence: The Lori Jackson Story	Aunt Lily	Television film
1999	Happy Face Murders	Judge Hoyle	Television film
1999	A Holiday Romance	Bea Buskins	Television film
2000	Enslavement: The True Story of Fanny Kemble	Daphne	Television film
2000	Cheaters	Mrs. Fadely	Television film
2000	The Wonderful World of Disney	Viney	Episode: "The Miracle Worker"
2001	Bojangles	Bedella	Television film
2001	Twice in a Lifetime	Mabel Jamal / Loretta	2 episodes
2001	Further Tales of the City	Emma Ravenel	3 episodes
2001	They Call Me Sirr	Grams	Television film
2001, 2002	Doc	Shawn's Grandma	2 episodes
2002	Sins of the Father	Mama Jones	Television film
2002	Street Time	Cleo	Episode: "No Excuses"
2002	Monk	Wendy Maas	Episode: "Mr. Monk and the Red-Headed Stranger"
2002–2005	Sue Thomas: F.B.Eye	Various roles	3 episodes
2003	Big Spender	Sally McNeal	Television film
2004	Soul Food	Joan	Episode: "In the Garden"
2005	This Is Wonderland	Lucia Smith	2 episodes
2006–2007	The Doodlebops	Jazzmin	39 episodes
2009–2011	Majority Rules!	Mrs. DeMarco	14 episodes
2010	The Gospel According to the Blues	Momma-Lou	Television film
2010	Living in Your Car	Althea	Episode #1.6
2013	Cracked	Woman	Episode: "Voices"
2014	Dear Viola	Rennie Jasper	Television film
2014	A Day Late and a Dollar Short	Geraldine	Television film
2014	Working the Engels	Mama	Episode: "The Crazy Family"
2020	Hey Lady!	Rosie	8 episodes
2020	Lockdown	Luke's Grandma	Miniseries
2020	Marry Me This Christmas	Hazel Treadgold	Television film
2021	Pretty Hard Cases	Maureen Gray	4 episodes
2021	In the Dark	Margie	Episode: "Arcade Fire"
2021	Riverfront Romance	Marianne Cooper	Television film
2021	Miracle in Motor City	Glenda	Television film
2022	Overlord and the Underwoods	Judge D. Redd	Episode: "Do-over and Over and Over"
2022	Take Note	Mable	Episode: "Courage"
2023	Total Drama Island	Leshawna's Grandmother	Episode: "Off the Hook!"
