= Kiss Me with the Wind =

Studio album by Brenda Russell
- Released: August 21, 1990
- Studio: Tarpan Studios (San Rafael, California); Ocean Way Recording, Conway Studios, Cherokee Studios and Studio 55 (Hollywood, California); Devonshire Sound Studios and Bill Schnee Studios (North Hollywood, California); Westlake Audio and Willyworld East/Willyworld West (Los Angeles, California); Take One Recording and The Enterprise (Burbank, California); The Zoo (Encino, California); Skyline Recording (Topanga, California)
- Genre: R&B; pop; dance
- Length: 51:36
- Label: A&M
- Producer: Brenda Russell; André Fischer; Narada Michael Walden; Larry Williams

Brenda Russell chronology
Get Here (1988)	Kiss Me with the Wind (1990)	Greatest Hits (1992)

Professional ratings
Review scores
Source	Rating
AllMusic	3/5 stars
Entertainment Weekly	B
Los Angeles Times	3.5/5 stars
People	(favourable)
Select	3/5 medals

Kiss Me with the Wind is the fifth studio album by the American singer/songwriter Brenda Russell, released in August 1990 on A&M Records.

== Album history ==
After the success of her fourth album, Get Here (1988), Russell collaborated again with a variety of different producers and songwriters. Taking more of a dance-oriented slant than her previous album, Russell worked with the famed songwriter/producer Narada Michael Walden, who co-wrote and produced two tracks for the album with her, including the title track and "Stop Running Away", both of which were released as singles.

Also included on the album is Russell's own version of "Dinner with Gershwin", a track that Russell had written years earlier and given to Donna Summer who had a hit with it in 1987 (Russell had co-produced Summer's version with Richard Perry).

== Track listing ==
1. "Kiss Me with the Wind" (Brenda Russell, Narada Michael Walden) – 4:29
2. "Stupid Love" (Brenda Russell) – 3:47
3. "All American" (Brenda Russell, Sharon Robinson) – 4:16
4. "Stop Running Away" (Brenda Russell, Narada Michael Walden) – 5:25
5. "Waiting for You" (Brenda Russell) – 5:18
6. "Justice in Truth" (Matthew Wilder, Brenda Russell) – 4:21
7. "Dinner with Gershwin" (Brenda Russell) – 4:33
8. "Good for Love" (Larry Williams, Brenda Russell) – 5:22
9. "Night Train to Leningrad" (Brenda Russell) – 5:11
10. "Drive My Car ('Til Sunset)" (Paul Chiten, Brenda Russell) – 4:50
11. "On Your Side" (Brenda Russell) – 3:54

== Personnel ==
=== Musicians ===
- Brenda Russell – lead vocals, backing vocals (1–3, 5–8, 10, 11), synthesizer programming (2, 5, 7, 9, 11), drum programming (5, 7, 9, 11), percussion (9)
- Louis Biancaniello – synthesizers (1), rhythm programming (1)
- Narada Michael Walden – synth bass (1), percussion (1), acoustic piano (4), drums (4)
- Ren Klyce – Fairlight programming (1, 4)
- Kurt Farquhar – additional synthesizer programming (2), drum programming (2)
- Winston Johnson – Synclavier programming (2, 5, 7, 9, 10), special effects (9)
- Sharon Robinson – synthesizer programming (3), drum programming (3), backing vocals (3, 5), additional backing vocals (10)
- Sam Ward – additional synthesizer sounds (3, 6, 11)
- Walter Afanasieff – acoustic piano (4), synthesizers (4), synth bass (4)
- Larry Williams – additional synthesizers (5, 9), synthesizer programming (8), synth bass (8), sax solo (8)
- Matthew Wilder – synthesizer programming (6), drum programming (6)
- Greg Phillinganes – Rhodes electric piano (6), acoustic piano (7), synth bass (7)
- William "Smitty" Smith – organ (7)
- Paul Chiten – synthesizer programming (10), drum programming (10)
- Russell Ferrante – acoustic piano (11)
- Ray Obiedo – rhythm guitar (1)
- Don Griffin – guitars (2, 3)
- Dean Parks – lead guitar (3)
- Earl Klugh – acoustic guitar (5, 10)
- Michael Thompson – guitars (8)
- Narada Michael Walden – synth bass (1), percussion (1), acoustic piano (4), drums (4)
- Don Boyett – synth bass programming (2)
- Eric Daniels – synth bass (4)
- Bill Sharpe – electric bass (8)
- Jimmy Haslip – bass (11)
- Jeff Porcaro – drums (6, 11)
- John Robinson – drums (8)
- Raul Rekow – percussion (4)
- Lenny Castro – percussion (5, 10)
- Luis Conte – percussion (8)
- Aaron Zigman – additional percussion programming (8)
- Bill Reichenbach Jr. – euphonium (9)
- Ronald B. Cooper – cello (9)
- André Fischer – rap (2)
- Philip Bailey – backing vocals (3)
- James Ingram – backing vocals (3)
- Phil Perry – backing vocals (3)
- Stephanie Spruill – backing vocals (3)
- Kitty Beethoven – backing vocals (4)
- Annie Stocking – backing vocals (4)
- Tina Thompson – backing vocals (4)
- Maxayn Lewis – backing vocals (5), additional backing vocals (10)
- Petsye Powell – backing vocals (5), additional backing vocals (10)
- The Sandra Crouch Singers – choir (11)

Arrangements

- Louis Biancaniello – rhythm arrangements (1)
- Narada Michael Walden – rhythm arrangements (1)
- Brenda Russell – arrangements (2, 5, 7–9, 11)
- André Fischer – arrangements (2)
- Sharon Robinson – arrangements (3)
- Matthew Wilder – arrangements (6)
- Larry Williams – arrangements (8)
- Paul Chiten – arrangements (10)

=== Production ===
- Eric Borenstein – executive producer, management
- Brenda Russell – executive producer, producer (2, 3, 5–11)
- Narada Michael Walden – producer (1, 4)
- André Fischer – producer (2, 3, 5–7, 9–11)
- Larry Williams – producer (8)
- Frank DeCaro – production coordinator (2, 3, 5–7, 9–11)
- Erik Hanson – production coordinator (8)
- Chuck Beeson – art direction
- Julie Osaki – design
- Vicki Pearson-Cameron – photography
- Fern Matia – hair stylist
- Carmel Passanisi – stylist
- Agostina – make-up
- Garry C. Kief – management
- Stiletto Entertainment – management
- Deanna Bowes – personal assistant

Technical credits

- Mike Reese – mastering at A&M Mastering Studios (Hollywood, California)
- David Frazer – recording (1, 4), mixing (1, 4)
- Jeffrey Woodruff – engineer (2), mixing (2), additional recording (9)
- Mick Guzauski – engineer (3, 6, 11), mixing (3, 5, 6, 10, 11)
- Brian Malouf – mixing (7)
- Tommy Vicari – mixing (8)
- Bill Schnee – mixing (9)
- Dana Jon Chappelle – assistant engineer (1, 4)
- Marc Reyburn – assistant engineer (1, 4)
- Ric Butz – assistant engineer (2, 5)
- Steve Montgomery – assistant engineer (2, 5, 7, 9, 10)
- Scott Gordon – assistant engineer (3, 6, 11)
- Mark Hagen – assistant engineer (3, 7, 9–11)
- Scott Ralston – mix assistant (7)
- Rob Harvey – mix assistant (8)
- Ken Allerdyce – mix assistant (9)
- Stacy Baird – assistant engineer (11)
- Richard McKernan – additional recording (2, 5), mix assistant (3, 5, 6, 10, 11), engineer (7–10)
- Steve Sykes – additional recording (2), engineer (5), drum recording (8)
- Doug Rider – additional recording (5)
- Tony Phillips – additional recording (8)
- Larry Williams – additional recording (8)
- Joe Wolpert – additional recording (8)

== Charts ==
Chart (1990)	Peak position
US Billboard Top R&B Albums	65

Singles

Year	Title	US AC	US R&B
1990	"Stop Running Away"	13	34
