= The Heart of the Man =

Studio album by Phil Perry
- Released: February 18, 1991
- Studios: The Sandbox Studios (Easton, Connecticut); Soundtrack Studios (New York City, New York); East Bay Studios (Tarrytown, New York); The Sound Spa and Sigma Sound Studios (Philadelphia, Pennsylvania); Skip Saylor Recording, Mad Hatter Studios, Lion Share Studios and B&J Studios (Los Angeles, California); Ocean Way Recording, Sunset Sound and Conway Studios (Hollywood, California); LeGonks West and Summa Studios (West Hollywood, California); A.E.M.P Studios (North Hollywood, California); Ground Control Studios (Santa Monica, California); Urban Beach Studios (Venice, California); Take One Studios (Burbank, California); Zebra Studio (Studio City, California); Skyline Recording (Topanga, California); Hush Hush Studios (London, UK)
- Genre: R&B
- Length: 53:58
- Label: Capitol
- Producers: Barry J. Eastmond (track 1); Robbie Nevil (track 2); Dave Shapiro (track 2); Brenda Russell (track 3); Lee Curreri (tracks 3, 6 & 11); Don Grusin (track 4); André Fischer (track 5); George Duke (track 7); David Garfield (track 8); Alan Hirshberg (track 8); Jeremy Lubbock (track 9); Donald Robinson (track 10)

Phil Perry chronology
The Heart of the Man (1991)	Pure Pleasure (1994)

Professional ratings
Review scores
Source	Rating
Pittsburgh Press	(favourable)

The Heart of the Man is the debut studio album by singer Phil Perry issued in 1991 on Capitol Records. The album peaked at No. 17 on the Billboard Top R&B Albums chart.

== Track listing ==
No.	Title	Writer(s)	Length
1.	"Amazing Love"	Barry Eastmond, Jolyon Skinner	04:28
2.	"Say Anything"	Dave Shapiro, Robbie Nevil, Sherri Foreman	05:26
3.	"Forever"	Brenda Russell	04:58
4.	"Woman"	Don Grusin, Tracy Mann	05:33
5.	"Who Do You Love"	Franne Golde, Nick Mundy, Paul Fox	04:25
6.	"More Nights"	Dennis Lambert, Franne Golde	04:53
7.	"Call Me"	Aretha Franklin	04:39
8.	"(Forever in the) Arms of Love"	David Garfield, James Felix, Lenny Castro, Michael Landau, Phil Perry	05:35
9.	"The Best of Me"	David Foster, Jeremy Lubbock, Richard Marx	04:49
10.	"God's Gift to the World" (Duet with CeCe Winans)	Mike Himelstein, Terry Sampson	05:21
11.	"Good-Bye"	David Garfield, Phil Perry	03:52

== Personnel ==
Musicians and Vocalists

- Phil Perry – lead vocals, backing vocals (1–4, 6–9, 11)
- Barry J. Eastmond – keyboards (1), drum programming (1)
- Eric Rehl – synthesizers (1), synthesizer programming (1)
- Dave Shapiro – keyboards (2), drum programming (2)
- Lee Curreri – acoustic piano (3), keyboards (3, 6, 11), synthesizer programming (3, 6, 11), drum programming (3, 6)
- Jeff Rona – synthesizer programming (3)
- John Philip Shenale – synthesizer programming (3, 6, 11)
- Brian Mead – Fairlight CMI (3)
- Larry Williams – MIDI controller (3)
- Don Grusin – acoustic piano (4), synthesizers (4)
- Paul Chiten – keyboards (5), synthesizer programming (5)
- Roman Johnson – keyboards (5), additional programming (5)
- George Duke – Yamaha TX816 Rhodes (7), Synclavier brass (7), Roland D550 bells (7), strings (7), fretless bass (7), percussion (7)
- David Garfield – keyboards (8)
- Jeremy Lubbock – synthesizers (9)
- Randy Waldman – synthesizer programming (9)
- Donald Robinson – keyboards (10)
- Carlos Rios – guitars (2)
- Donald Griffin – electric guitar (3, 6, 11), guitars (5)
- Lee Ritenour – guitars (4)
- Paul Jackson Jr. – guitars (7)
- Michael Landau – guitars (8)
- Randy Bowland – guitars (10)
- Neil Stubenhaus – bass (3, 6, 11)
- Gerald Albright – bass (4), soprano saxophone (4)
- Freddie Washington – bass (7)
- Jimmy Johnson – bass (8)
- Gerald Veasley – bass (10)
- Harvey Mason – drums (4)
- Ricky Lawson – drums (7)
- Carlos Vega – drums (8)
- Chris Alberts – drum programming (10)
- Jeff Porcaro – drums (11)
- Brian Kilgore – percussion (2)
- Angel Luis Figueroa – percussion (3)
- Lenny Castro – percussion (6, 8, 11), Akai marimba (8)
- Daryl Burgee – percussion (10)
- Brandon Fields – saxophone (2), alto saxophone (11)
- Dave Koz – saxophone (5)
- Andy Najera – alto saxophone (6, 11)
- David Woodford – baritone saxophone (6, 11)
- Everette Harp – alto saxophone (7)
- Steve Tavaglione – flute (8)
- Ernie Watts – alto saxophone (9)
- Garrett Adkins – trombone (6, 11)
- Lee Thornburg – trumpet (6, 11)
- Kathleen Thomas – strings (10)
- Yolanda Lee – backing vocals (1)
- Phillip Ingram – backing vocals (2)
- Lilian Tynes-Perry – backing vocals (2, 3, 5, 7, 8)
- Brenda Russell – backing vocals (3)
- Alfie Silas – backing vocals (5)
- Fred White – backing vocals (5)
- Kevin Dorsey – backing vocals (7)
- Roy Galloway – backing vocals (7)
- Josie James – backing vocals (7)
- Paulette Brown – backing vocals (8)
- CeCe Winans – lead vocals (10)
- Gabriel Hardeman – additional vocals (10)
- Spencer Harrison – additional vocals (10)
- Charlene Holloway – additional vocals (10)
- The Hall Family Singers – additional vocals (10)
- The Johnson Family Singers – additional vocals (10)
- The Robertson Family – additional vocals (10)
- The Sadler Family – additional vocals (10)

Music arrangements

- Barry J. Eastmond – arrangements (1)
- Lee Curreri – arrangements (3, 6, 11), horn arrangements (6, 11)
- Brenda Russell – arrangements (3)
- Don Grusin – arrangements (4)
- Paul Chiten – arrangements (5)
- André Fischer – arrangements (5)
- David Garfield – arrangements (8)
- David Foster – arrangements (9)
- Donald Robinson – arrangements (10)

== Production ==
- Bruce Lundvall – executive producer
- Tommy Steele – art direction
- Johnny Lee – design
- Jeff Katz – photography
- Dan Cleary Management Associates – management

Technical credits

- Wally Traugott – mastering at Capitol Mastering (Hollywood, California)
- Earl Cohen – recording (1), mixing (1)
- Howard Lee Wolen – recording (2)
- Brian Malouf – mixing (2)
- John Carter – recording (3, 6, 11)
- John Beverly Jones – recording (3, 6, 11)
- Tommy Vicari – mixing (3, 6, 11)
- Don Murray – recording (4), mixing (4)
- Richard McKernan – recording (5)
- Steve Sykes – recording (5), mixing (5)
- Dave Rideau – recording (7)
- Mick Guzauski – mixing (7)
- Alan Hirshberg – recording (8), mixing (8)
- John Arrias – recording (9)
- Randy Waldman – recording (9)
- Humberto Gatica – mixing (9)
- Al Alberts Jr. – recording (10)
- Michael Tarsia – mixing (10)
- Mike Harlow – assistant engineer (1)
- Chris Trevett – assistant engineer (1)
- Paula "Max" Garcia – assistant engineer (2)
- Greg Loskorn – assistant engineer (2)
- Patrick MacDougall – mix assistant (2)
- Chris Fuhrman – assistant engineer (3, 6, 11)
- Alejandro Rodriguez – assistant engineer (3, 6, 11)
- Mike Kloster – assistant engineer (4)
- Kevin Fisher – recording assistant (7)
- Craig Porteils – mix assistant (7)
- Robert Read – assistant engineer (8)
- Guy DeFazio – recording assistant (9)
- Carl Angstadt – assistant engineer (10)
- John Kraus – assistant engineer (10)
- Sal Viarellie – assistant engineer (10)

== Charts ==
=== Weekly charts ===
Chart (1991)	Peak position
US Top R&B/Hip-Hop Albums (Billboard)	17

=== Year-end charts ===
Chart (1991)	Position
US Top R&B/Hip-Hop Albums (Billboard)	54
