= Brenda Russell (album) =

- Original cover art (1979)

Studio album by Brenda Russell
- Released: 25 July 1979
- Recorded: 1979
- Studios: Kendun Recorders (Burbank, California); Conway Recording Studios and United Western Recorders (Hollywood, California)
- Genres: R&B; pop; dance
- Length: 34:00
- Label: Horizon Records
- Producer: André Fischer

Brenda Russell chronology
| Brenda Russell (1979) | Love Life (1981) |

Alternative cover
- Cover of the 2000 re-release

Professional ratings
Review scores
| Source | Rating |
|---|---|
| AllMusic | 4.5/5 stars |
| BBC | (favourable) |
| Christgau's Record Guide | B+ |
| DownBeat | 1/5 stars |

Brenda Russell is the self-titled debut studio album by American singer-songwriter Brenda Russell, released on 25 July 1979 by A&M Records on the Horizon label. The album peaked at No. 20 on the Billboard R&B albums chart.

== Overview ==
After working for several years with her then-husband Brian Russell as session musicians and by themselves as the duo Brian & Brenda in the mid-1970s, the couple divorced and Brenda Russell embarked on a solo career by signing with A&M Records.

The album was written almost entirely by Russell and produced by Andre Fischer, who was fresh off of a stint as drummer for Rufus. The single, "So Good So Right", reached Nos. 8, 15 and 30 on the Billboard Adult Contemporary, Hot Soul Songs and Hot 100 charts, respectively.

The track "Think It Over", written by Russell with her then-husband Brian, was previously recorded by Charlie's Angels star Cheryl Ladd, who would go on to marry Brian following his divorce from Brenda.

== Sampling and covers ==
Luther Vandross did a cover of "If Only for One Night" on his 1985 album The Night I Fell in Love, and then in 2006, singer Janet Jackson sampled "If Only for One Night" in her song "Do It 2 Me" off the album 20 Y.O.. In 1998, American rapper Big Pun sampled "A Little Bit of Love" on his hit single "Still Not a Player". In 2003, Mexican singer Thalía sampled the song in "I Want You", and in 2013 Ariana Grande and Mac Miller sampled the same song for their top 10 hit single, "The Way". In 2001, singer Mary J. Blige sampled "God Bless You" in her song "Flying Away". Chance the Rapper heavily sampled "So Good, So Right" for his song "Prom Night" on the 2012 mixtape 10 Day.

In 2000, the album was re-released on CD with new cover artwork and included Russell's most well-known hit "Piano in the Dark" from 1988 as a bonus track.

== Track listing ==
1. "So Good, So Right" - 3:20
2. "In the Thick of It" - 3:56
3. "If Only for One Night" - 4:13
4. "Way Back When" - 4:23
5. "A Little Bit of Love" - 4:41
6. "You're Free" – 3:30
7. "Think It Over" - 5:17
8. "God Bless You" - 4:48

All tracks composed by Brenda Russell, except:
"You're Free" (lyrics: Brenda Russell, music: Andre Fischer, Brenda Russell)
"Think It Over" (lyrics: Brenda Russell, music: Brian Russell, Brenda Russell).

== Personnel ==
Musicians

- Brenda Russell – lead vocals, backing vocals (1–7), acoustic piano (1–3, 5), Wurlitzer electric piano (4, 7), Fender Rhodes (5)
- Ron Stockert – Fender Rhodes (1–4, 6–8), acoustic piano (4, 8), clavinet (5)
- Ian Underwood – synthesizers (2, 4)
- Clare Fischer – organ (4, 7), electric guitar (7)
- George Sopuch – electric guitar (1, 2, 6), guitar solo (6)
- Fred Tackett – electric guitar (1, 6), acoustic guitar (2)
- David Wolfert – electric guitar (1, 7)
- Ed Brown – bass
- André Fischer – drums
- Victor Feldman – percussion (2, 4), vibraphone (5)
- Henry Gibson – percussion (2)
- Hector Andrade – timbales (5)
- Tom Saviano – soprano saxophone (1)
- Doug Richardson – tenor saxophone (2, 8)
- Gary Herbig – baritone saxophone (5), alto flute (5), English horn (6)
- Larry Williams – tenor saxophone (5), alto flute (5, 6), flute (5)
- Bill Reichenbach Jr. – baritone horn (5), bass trombone (5)
- Judd Miller – trumpet (1)
- Steve Madaio – trumpet (1), flugelhorn (1)
- Chuck Findley – flugelhorn (5, 6), piccolo trumpet (5)
- Jerry Hey – trumpet (5)
- David McKelvy – harmonica (7)
- Doublerock Baptist Junior Choir – backing vocals (5)
- Michele Aller – backing vocals (5, 7, 8)
- Susaye Greene – backing vocals (5, 7, 8)
- Elaine Hill – backing vocals (5, 7, 8)
- Joe Esposito – backing vocals (7)
- Eddie Hokenson – backing vocals (7)
- Arnold McCuller – backing vocals (7)
- Petsye Powell – backing vocals (7)
- Bruce Sudano – backing vocals (7)
- Kathy Collier – backing vocals (8)
- Venette Gloud – backing vocals (8)
- Carmen Twillie – backing vocals (8)

Arrangements

- Brenda Russell – rhythm arrangements, vocal arrangements, horn arrangements (5)
- André Fischer – rhythm arrangements
- David Wolfert – horn arrangements (1), string arrangements (1, 7)
- Clare Fischer – string arrangements (3, 8), concertmaster (6)
- Jerry Peters – string arrangements (4, 6), horn arrangements (6)
- Bill Reichenbach Jr. – horn arrangements (5)
- Harry Bluestone – concertmaster (1, 7)
- Gerald Vinci – concertmaster (3, 8)
- Assa Drori – concertmaster (4)

== Production ==
- Andre Fischer – producer
- Brenda Dash – associate producer
- John Rhys – recording
- Al Schmitt – mixing at Capitol Studios (Hollywood, California)
- Don Henderson – assistant engineer
- Murray McFadden – assistant engineer
- Phil Moores – assistant engineer
- Terry More – assistant engineer
- Mike Reese – mastering at The Mastering Lab (Hollywood, California)
- Roland Young – art direction
- Amy Nagasawa – design
- Claude Mougin – photography

== Charts ==
Album

| Chart (1979) | Peak position |
|---|---|
| US Billboard 200 | 65 |
| US R&B Chart | 26 |

Singles

| Year | Single | Chart | Position |
|---|---|---|---|
| 1979 | "So Good, So Right" | US Billboard Hot 100 | 30 |
| 1980 | "So Good, So Right" / "In the Thick of It" | UK Singles Chart | 51 |
