= Greg Phillinganes =

American keyboardist and session musician

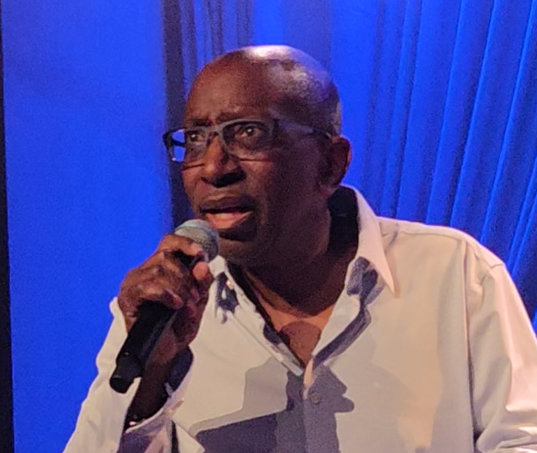
- Phillinganes at Blue Note in 2026

Background information
- Also known as: Mouse, Philly Steak
- Born: Gregory Arthur Phillinganes; May 12, 1956 (age 70); Detroit, Michigan, U.S.
- Genres: Pop rock; progressive rock; R&B
- Occupation: Musician
- Instruments: Keyboards; synthesizer; vocals
- Years active: 1976–present
- Member of: Stevie Wonder; David Gilmour; The Jacksons; Michael Jackson; Toto; Eric Clapton; Quincy Jones; Bruno Mars; The Pussycat Dolls; John Mayer

Gregory Arthur Phillinganes (born May 12, 1956) is an American keyboardist, vocalist, and arranger. A session musician, Phillinganes has contributed to numerous albums over a broad array of artists and genres. He has toured with artists including Stevie Wonder, Eric Clapton, David Gilmour, Toto and the Pussycat Dolls, was musical director for Michael Jackson, and has released two solo studio albums.

== Early life ==
Gregory Arthur Phillinganes was born in Detroit, Michigan, on May 12, 1956, to Elaine Uris Phillinganes (née Wattley), who was born in Scarborough, Tobago, and Ardick Lewis Phillinganes, a professional violinist. He began playing a neighbor's piano by ear at the age of two, beginning lessons a few years later after his mother purchased a piano for him. He took lessons from two different instructors, then from Misha Kotler, a Detroit Symphony Orchestra pianist who introduced the discipline and technique Phillinganes required. He credits Kotler with showing him proper hand posture and for influencing him to play with "a sense of dexterity and definition".

== Career ==
After drummer Ricky Lawson gave Stevie Wonder a cassette of Phillinganes's instrumental renditions of his own songs, Phillinganes auditioned for Wonder's band, Wonderlove, and played with them from 1976 to 1981. The year 1978 began a three-decade-long involvement with Michael Jackson and the Jacksons for Phillinganes. He arranged the Jacksons' 1978 album Destiny and played keyboard on their follow-up album Triumph. He accompanied the Jackson family to Walt Disney World and referred to Katherine Jackson as "Mom".

Phillinganes contributed to Michael's solo albums. He was hired as a session musician for his contributions to Off The Wall and then to Jackson's best-selling album Thriller, but did not receive royalties.
He served as the musical director for Jackson's Bad and Dangerous concert tours, and the Michael Jackson: 30th Anniversary Special. In 2022, Phillinganes was mentioned in several episodes of the podcast series Stories in the Room: Michael Jackson's Thriller Album Podcast.

In 1981, Phillinganes released his first solo album, Significant Gains. The Boston Globe reviewer Richard Cromonic noted Wonder's influence on the album and praised the creativity of the compositions. He criticized the lyrics as being less creative, and said that Significant Gains might be too close to Wonder's sound, calling it "blatant emulation". The album was not successful, but the song "Baby, I Do Love You" was a minor R&B hit. Three years later, Phillinganes released his follow-up album Pulse, with another minor hit, a cover of Yellow Magic Orchestra's song "Behind the Mask", with additional lyrics by Michael Jackson. This single was more successful on the dance music charts. When he later joined Eric Clapton's backing band, Phillinganes introduced the tune to Clapton, who covered it on his 1986 August album. Throughout the 1980s and the early 1990s he made solo recordings and toured with Clapton and worked as a session musician for several artists. He continued session work in later years.

Phillinganes has worked and toured with musicians including Stevie Wonder, George Harrison, the Bee Gees, Donna Summer, Anita Baker, George Benson, Karen Carpenter, Eric Clapton, John Mayer, Donald Fagen, Aretha Franklin, Patti LaBelle, Michael Jackson, Richard Marx, Paul McCartney, Al Jarreau, Quincy Jones, and Stevie Nicks. In 1982, he played on the Paul Simon album Hearts and Bones and in 1995, he played on the Joan Armatrading album What's Inside.

Starting in 2003, Phillinganes filled in for the semi-retired David Paich on tour with the band Toto. He became a full-time member of the band by 2005, and contributed to their album Falling in Between. He continued to tour as a member of Toto until the band became inactive in 2008, and did not rejoin when Toto re-formed in 2010. In 2022, Phillinganes filled in for Toto's Dominique Xavier Taplin during the 'Dogz of Oz' tour during the Norwegian shows. Toto announced in 2024 on Facebook that he and drummer Shannon Forrest were returning to the touring lineup.. By the end of 2025 Phillinganes announced that he would not join the band for their upcoming 2026 tour.

Phillinganes was the musical director for Cirque du Soleil's Michael Jackson: The Immortal World Tour for its run from 2011 to 2014. He was Musical Director for the 2014 Women of Soul performance at the White House with Aretha Franklin, Patti LaBelle, Ariana Grande and Jill Scott. In 2014 and 2015 he was the music director for Wonder's Songs in the Key of Life Tour. He toured with the European leg of David Gilmour's Rattle That Lock tour. He again toured with Gilmour in 2024 on his Luck and Strange tour.

In 2026 he was again the music director for Wonder's Songs in the Key of Life 50th Anniversery Tour.

Phillinganes won a 2015 Creative Arts Emmy Award for Outstanding Music Direction for his role as musical director for the television special Stevie Wonder: Songs in the Key of Life and was music director for the 2016 Grammy Awards.

== Personal life ==
Phillinganes has been married four times. He married his first wife in 1979, after leaving Stevie Wonder's band. He has one daughter, Ellian, with his third wife. He is currently married to singer Jory Steinberg with whom he has twin sons, Lennon Gray and Lorne Ellington.

== Discography ==
Solo

- Significant Gains (1981)
- Pulse (1984)

With Quincy Jones

- One Hundred Ways (1981)

With John Mayer

- Sob Rock (2021)

With Michael Jackson

- Off the Wall (1979)
- Thriller (1982)
- Bad (1987)
- Dangerous (1991)

With David Gilmour

- Live at Pompeii (2017)

With Laura Branigan

- Laura Branigan (1990)

With Donna Summer

- Donna Summer (1982)

With Sheryl Crow

- Threads (2019)

With Mick Jagger

- Primitive Cool (1987)

With Deniece Williams

- When Love Comes Calling (1978)
- Special Love (1989)

With Thelma Houston

- Ready to Roll (1978)

With Dionne Warwick

- Finder of Lost Loves (1985)
- Reservations for Two (1987)

With Richard Marx

- Rush Street (1991)
- Flesh and Bone (1997)
- Days in Avalon (2000)

With Toni Braxton

- Secrets (1996)
- The Heat (2000)
- Libra (2005)

With Stephen Bishop

- Bish (1978)

With Brenda Russell

- Kiss Me with the Wind (1990)
- Soul Talkin' (1993)
- Paris Rain (2000)

With Paul Simon

- Hearts and Bones (1983)
- The Rhythm of the Saints (1990)

With Michael Bublé

- Call Me Irresponsible (2007)

With Bill Withers

- Watching You Watching Me (1985)

With Michael McDonald

- If That's What It Takes (1982)
- Blink of an Eye (1993)

With Barbra Streisand

- Back to Broadway (1993)
- Higher Ground (1997)

With Rod Stewart

- Soulbook (2009)

With Leo Sayer

- Leo Sayer (1978)

With Elvis Costello

- Painted From Memory (1998)

With Stevie Nicks

- Rock a Little (1985)

With Willie Nelson

- The Great Divide (2002)

With Anita Baker

- Rapture (1986)
- Compositions (1990)
- Rhythm of Love (1994)

With Ronan Keating

- When Ronan Met Burt (2011)

With Faith Evans

- Keep the Faith (1998)

With Paul Young

- The Crossing (1993)

With Melissa Manchester

- Don't Cry Out Loud (1978)

With Natalie Cole

- Dangerous (1985)
- Everlasting (1987)

With Mariah Carey

- Merry Christmas (1994)

With Al Jarreau

- High Crime (1984)
- My Old Friend: Celebrating George Duke (2014)

With Leonard Cohen

- The Future (1992)

With Chaka Khan

- What Cha' Gonna Do for Me (1981)

With Patti Austin

- Patti Austin (1984)
- The Real Me (1988)
- Love Is Gonna Getcha (1990)
- Carry On (1991)
- That Secret Place (1994)
- On the Way to Love (2001)
- Sound Advice (2011)

With Bryan Ferry

- Taxi (1993)

With Ray Parker Jr.

- After Dark (1987)

With Minnie Riperton

- Love Lives Forever (1980)

With Wynonna Judd

- What the World Needs Now Is Love (2003)

With Joan Armatrading

- What's Inside (1995)

With Olivia Newton-John

- Soul Kiss (1985)

With Richie Sambora

- Undiscovered Soul (1998)

With Boz Scaggs

- Fade into Light (1996)
- Dig (2001)

With Cheryl Lynn

- In Love (1979)

With Jennifer Holliday

- Feel My Soul (1983)

With Roberta Flack

- Oasis (1988)
- Set the Night to Music (1991)

With Michael Bolton

- Timeless: The Classics (1992)
- Timeless: The Classics Vol. 2 (1999)

With Ilse DeLange

- Clean Up (2003)

With James Taylor

- October Road (2002)

With Jennifer Rush

- Heart Over Mind (1987)

With Eddie Money

- Life for the Taking (1979)

With Diane Schuur

- Friends For Schuur (2000)

With Philip Bailey

- Triumph (1986)

With Kenny Loggins

- Vox Humana (1985)
- Leap of Faith (1991)
- The Unimaginable Life (1997)

With Patti LaBelle

- Winner in You (1986)
- Burnin' (1991)
- Timeless Journey (2004)

With Terence Trent D'Arby

- Symphony or Damn (1993)

With Peabo Bryson and Roberta Flack

- Born to Love (1983)

With Neil Diamond

- Primitive (1984)
- Headed for the Future (1986)
- Melody Road (2014)

With Donald Fagen

- The Nightfly (1982)

With Bill LaBounty

- Bill LaBounty (1982)

With Earth, Wind & Fire

- I've Had Enough (1981)

With Rickie Lee Jones

- The Magazine (1984)
- Flying Cowboys (1989)
- The Evening of My Best Day (2003)

With Lionel Richie

- Lionel Richie (1982)
- Can't Slow Down (1983)
- Dancing on the Ceiling (1986)

With Joe Cocker

- Civilized Man (1984)
- Night Calls (1991)

With Stephanie Mills

- Merciless (1983)

With Peter Allen

- I Could Have Been a Sailor (1979)

With Syreeta Wright

- One to One (1977)

With The Jacksons

- Destiny (1978)
- Triumph (1980)

With George Benson

- Give Me the Night (1980)
- In Your Eyes (1983)
- While the City Sleeps... (1986)
- Songs and Stories (2009)

With Toto

- Falling in Between (2006)

With Aretha Franklin

- Love All the Hurt Away (1981)

With Donald Byrd

- Thank You...For F.U.M.L. (Funking Up My Life) (1978)

With Eric Clapton

- Behind the Sun (1985)
- August (1986)
- Journeyman (1989)
- Pilgrim (1998)

With Stevie Wonder

- Songs in the Key of Life (1976)
- Conversation Peace (1995)
- A Time to Love (2005)

With The Pointer Sisters

- Special Things (1980)
- Black & White (1981)
- So Excited! (1982)
- Break Out (1983)

With The Isley Brothers and Santana

- Power of Peace (2017)
