= Piano in the Dark =

Single by Brenda Russell

from the album Get Here
- B-side: "This Time I Need You"
- Released: February 2, 1988
- Recorded: 1987
- Genre: R&B; soul
- Length: 5:20 (album version); 4:27 (single version)
- Label: A&M
- Songwriters: Brenda Russell; Jeff Hull; Scott Cutler
- Producers: Brenda Russell; Jeff Hull

Brenda Russell singles chronology
"If You Love (The One You Lose)" (1981)	"Piano in the Dark" (1988)	"Get Here" (1988)

Music video
- "Piano in the Dark" on YouTube

"Piano in the Dark" is a song by American singer-songwriter Brenda Russell (featuring backing vocals by Joe Esposito). It was the first single to be taken from Russell's 1988 album, Get Here.

== Song information ==
Russell, believing "that in every title there's a song somewhere," made a habit of "collecting" interesting phrases she heard and placing them in a notebook for potential song titles. It was through this process that she wrote the lyrics to "Piano in the Dark" as the title seemed to fit with the music her co-writers sent her. In the early stages Russell did not understand what the title would refer to, eventually deciding it was about

...this woman. Her lover plays piano. And she wants to leave him, because she's really kind of bored. But every time she does that, he sits down and starts playing. And it sucks her right back in. She's so in love with the way he plays. And he plays in the dark, theoretically. It's not that literal, necessarily. But that's what keeps her to him, basically, is his music. And I just found that was an interesting story to write about.

Initially "Gravity" was planned to be released as the first single, however Herb Alpert pushed to have "Piano" released instead, feeling that it better represented her as an artist.

"Piano in the Dark" was released in early 1988, nine years after Russell's previous charting single on the Billboard Hot 100 (1979's "So Good, So Right"). The ballad gained heavy airplay and became Russell's biggest hit, peaking at number 6 on the Billboard Hot 100, number 8 on the R&B chart and number 3 on the Adult Contemporary chart. The song was also a moderate hit in the UK, peaking at number 23, but spending over three months on the chart due to its slow but steady climb to its peak.

The song earned Russell two Grammy Award nominations in 1989, including one for Song of the Year.

== Music video ==
There are two music videos. The first version, filmed in black-and-white, shows Brenda Russell looking depressed in her apartment as she tosses cards in a derby and thinks about her lover, a long-haired blond man playing on the piano. The second video was filmed in color and mostly shown in the US where a smiling Russell is shown performing with her band (including Joe Esposito) in a dimly lit nightclub with many people during a thunderstorm at night.

== Charts ==
Chart (1988)	Peak position
Canada RPM Top Singles	23
UK Singles Chart	23
US Billboard Hot 100	6
US Billboard Hot R&B Singles	8
US Billboard Adult Contemporary	3

=== Year-end charts ===
Chart (1988)	Position
United States (Billboard)	81

== Cover version ==
- Pianist Alex Bugnon covered the song from his 1988 debut album Love Season.

== Sampling ==
- In 1997, Hip-Hop duo Nice & Smooth sampled the opening melody on their song "Let It Go" from their album IV: Blazing Hot.
- In 2011, the Bingo Players released a dance mix "Cry (Just a Little)", which consisted entirely of a repetition of the first line from "Piano in the Dark"'s main chorus: "I know I'm caught up in the middle, I cry just a little, When I think of letting go".
- Bingo Players' version was also used in Flo Rida's 2012 hit "I Cry".
