= Love Life (Brenda Russell album) =

Studio album by Brenda Russell
- Released: October 24, 1981
- Studio: Sound Labs and Capitol Studios (Hollywood, California); Synthesizers recorded at Chateau Recorders (North Hollywood, California)
- Genre: R&B; pop; dance
- Length: 30:34
- Label: A&M
- Producer: Stewart Levine

Brenda Russell chronology
Brenda Russell (1979)	Love Life (1981)	Two Eyes (1983)

Love Life is the second studio album by American singer/songwriter Brenda Russell, released in 1981 by A&M Records.

== Critical reception ==
Professional ratings
Review scores
Source	Rating
AllMusic	3/5 stars

People described the LP as "eight of her pleasantly upbeat songs delivered with sassy-to-soothing vocals". Phyl Garland of Stereo Review called the album "fresh, accessible and delightful".

== Track listing ==
No.	Title	Writer(s)	Length
1.	"Love Life"	Brenda Russell	3:33
2.	"Rainbow"	Brenda Russell	4:28
3.	"Something I Like To Do"	Brenda Russell	4:29
4.	"Lucky"	Brenda Russell	2:50
5.	"Sensitive Man"	Brenda Russell, Neil Larsen	3:32
6.	"Deep Dark And Mysterious"	Brenda Russell	2:58
7.	"If You Love"	Brenda Russell	4:36
8.	"Thank You"	Brenda Russell, Stewart Levine	4:08

== Personnel ==
- Brenda Russell – lead vocals, backing vocals (2–8), acoustic piano (2–7), clavinet (6)
- Neil Larsen – Fender Rhodes, acoustic piano (1), organ (4, 5), Wurlitzer electric piano (6), backing vocals (8)
- Steve Porcaro – synthesizers (1–5)
- Don Grusin – synthesizers (8)
- Steve Lukather – guitar solo (1, 5), electric guitar (2, 6, 7), guitars (4, 5, 8), first guitar solo (8)
- Dean Parks – guitars (1, 3–5), electric guitar (2, 7), acoustic guitar solo (2), acoustic guitar (7)
- Buzz Feiten – guitars (8), second guitar solo (8), backing vocals (8)
- Abraham Laboriel – bass (1–4, 6–8)
- Robert Popwell – bass (5)
- Jeff Porcaro – drums
- Lenny Castro – percussion (1, 3–8), backing vocals (8)
- Bill Champlin – backing vocals (1, 8)
- Donny Gerrard – backing vocals (1, 5, 6, 8), lead vocals (7)
- Jay Gruska – backing vocals (1)
- David Lasley – backing vocals (1)
- Arnold McCuller – backing vocals (1, 6, 8)
- Cinnamon Sharpe – backing vocals (1)
- Stewart Levine – backing vocals (8)

Handclaps on "Lucky"

- Lenny Castro, Abraham Laboriel, Neil Larsen, Steve Lukather, Jeff Porcaro and Brenda Russell

== Production ==
- Brenda Russell – executive producer
- Stewart Levine – producer
- Al Schmitt – recording, mixing
- Don Henderson – assistant engineer
- Stewart Whitmore – assistant engineer
- Bernie Grundman – mastering at A&M Studios (Hollywood, California)
- Chuck Beeson – art direction
- Lynn Robb – design
- Paddy Reynolds – photography

== Charts ==
Year	Chart	Peak position
1981	US Billboard Top Soul Albums	42
