= Get Here (album) =

Studio album by Brenda Russell
- Released: 1988
- Recorded: 1985–1987
- Studio: Atlantis Studios (Stockholm, Sweden); Cherokee Studios, Ocean Way Recording and The Grey Room (Hollywood, California); Mama Jo's and Bill Schnee Studio (North Hollywood, California); Take One Studios (Burbank, California); The Village Recorder, Elumba Recording and Westlake Studios (Los Angeles, California)
- Genre: R&B; pop; dance
- Length: 35:09
- Label: A&M
- Producer: Brenda Russell; Stanley Clarke; André Fischer; Jeff Hull; Peter O. Ekberg

Brenda Russell chronology
Two Eyes (1983)	Get Here (1988)	Kiss Me with the Wind (1990)

Singles from A Love Trilogy
- 1. "Piano in the Dark" Released: February 2, 1988; 2. "Gravity" Released: 1988; 3. "Get Here" Released: September 13, 1988

Professional ratings
Review scores
Source	Rating
AllMusic	3/5 stars
New York Times	(favourable)
Washington Post	(favourable)

Get Here is the fourth studio album by the American singer/songwriter Brenda Russell. Released in 1988, it is Russell's most successful album to date and includes her hit single "Piano in the Dark" as well as the minor hit title track, "Get Here," which became an international success for Oleta Adams three years later.

== Album history ==
After the release of her third album, Two Eyes (1983), Russell moved to Stockholm, Sweden and began writing songs for her fourth album in 1984. Working with several producers and recorded at ten different studios in Stockholm and Los Angeles, the album was ultimately released in 1988 and saw Russell return to the A&M Records label that had released her first two solo albums in 1979 and 1981 (her 1983 album had been released via Warner Bros.). The album peaked at number 49 on the US Billboard 200 and number 20 on the Billboard R&B chart.

The ballad "Piano in the Dark", a duet with Joe "Bean" Esposito, was released on February 2, 1988, as the first single from the album. The single became (and remains) Russell's biggest hit, peaking at number 6 on the US Billboard 100 and was also a Top 30 hit in the UK (No. 23), as well as earning Grammy nominations for "Song of the Year" and "Best Pop Performance by a Duo or Group With Vocals" (Russell would also garner a nomination for "Best Pop Vocal Performance, Female" for Get Here). Other singles from the album include "Le Restaurant" — with an alto saxophone solo from David Sanborn — and the dance track "Gravity". The title track of the album was also released as a single on September 13, 1988, and was a minor R&B hit. It was later recorded by Oleta Adams and became a huge trans-Atlantic hit for her in 1991 (US No. 5, UK No. 4).

== Track listing ==
Credits are adapted from the album's Liner Notes

1. "Gravity"
  (Brenda Russell, Gardner Cole) - 3:28
2. "Just A Believer" (featuring Dave Koz)
  (Russell, Jeff Hull) - 3:55
3. "Piano in the Dark" (featuring Joe Esposito)
  (Russell, Hull, Scott Cutler) - 5:19
4. "This Time I Need You"
  (Russell, Joe Turano) - 4:54
5. "Make My Day"
  (Russell) - 4:24
6. "Le Restaurant" (featuring David Sanborn)
  (Russell) - 4:33
7. "Midnight Eyes"
  (Russell) - 3:40
8. "Get Here"
  (Russell) - 4:56

== Personnel ==
Credits adapted from AllMusic and the album's liner notes.

=== Musicians ===
- Brenda Russell – lead vocals, backing vocals (4–7)
- Gardner Cole – synthesizers (1), drum machine (1)
- Wayne Linsey – additional synthesizers (1)
- Jeff Hull – synthesizers (2, 3, 7), drum machine (2, 3, 7)
- Michael Ruff – additional synthesizers (3)
- Russell Ferrante – acoustic piano (3, 6), synthesizers (6, 8)
- Peter Ljung – synthesizers (4, 8), additional synthesizers (5)
- Anders Neglin – synthesizers (4)
- Larry Williams – synthesizers (4, 5), horns (5)
- Kevin Toney – additional synthesizers (5)
- Joe Sample – electric piano (8)
- Paul Jackson Jr. – guitars (1)
- James Harrah – guitars (3)
- Peter O. Ekberg – guitars (4)
- Henrik Janson – guitars (4, 5, 8), guitar solo (5)
- Don Griffin – additional guitars (5)
- Dann Huff – guitars (7)
- Janne Schaffer – guitar synthesizer (8)
- Nathan East – bass (5)
- Jimmy Haslip – bass (6)
- Ed Brown – bass (7)
- Sam Bengtsson – bass (8)
- Per Lindvall – drums (4, 5)
- Vinnie Colaiuta – drums (6)
- Åke Sundqvist – drums (8), percussion (8)
- Dave Koz – tenor saxophone solo (2)
- David Sanborn – alto saxophone solo (6)
- Jerry Hey – trumpet (6), flugelhorn (6)
- The Jam Squad (Joe Esposito, Donny Gerrard, Howard Smith and Joe Turano) – backing vocals (1)
- Joe Esposito – male vocals (3)
- The Jamettes (Charlotte Crossley, Paulette Parker and Sharon Robinson) – backing vocals (2)
- Joe Turano – additional backing vocals (4)

Note: Paulette Parker is also known as Maxayn Lewis.

=== Production ===
- Brenda Russell – executive producer, producer
- Stanley Clarke – producer (1, 2)
- Jeff Hull – producer (3)
- André Fischer – producer (3–8)
- Peter O. Ekberg – producer (4, 5, 8)
- Csaba Petocz – recording, mixing (1)
- Bill Schnee – recording, mixing (2–8)
- Steve Sykes – recording
- Jan Ugand – recording
- Gary Wagner – recording
- Jim Dineen – assistant engineer
- Reggie Dozier – assistant engineer
- Mike Edwards – assistant engineer
- Steve Ford – assistant engineer
- Toni Greene – assistant engineer
- Debbie Johnson – assistant engineer
- Michael C. Ross – assistant engineer
- Micajah Ryan – assistant engineer
- Joe Schiff – assistant engineer
- Brad Stevens – assistant engineer
- Doug Sax – mastering at The Mastering Lab (Hollywood, California)
- Marsha Burns – production assistant, album coordinator
- Chuck Beeson – art direction
- Donald Kreiger – album design, special photo treatments
- Raul Vega – photography
- Martine Leger – stylist
- Nathalie Harris – make-up
- John Walker – hair stylist
- Tiki Jones – hair stylist
- Eric Borenstein and Garry C. Kief – management for Stiletto Entertainment

== Charts ==
Album

Year	Chart	Position
1988	US Billboard 200	49
1988	US R&B Chart	20
1988	UK Albums Chart	77

Singles

Year	Single	Chart	Position
1988	"Piano In The Dark"	US Billboard Hot 100	6
1988	"Piano In The Dark"	US R&B Chart	8
1988	"Piano In The Dark"	US Adult Contemporary	3
1988	"Piano In The Dark"	UK Singles Chart	23
1988	"Gravity"	US R&B Chart	42
1988	"Gravity"	UK Singles Chart	77
1988	"Get Here"	US R&B Chart	37
1989	"Le Restaurant"	US R&B Chart	93
