= Alex Bugnon =

Swiss jazz pianist and composer

- Born: Alex Bugnon; October 10, 1958 (age 68); Montreux, Switzerland
- Genre: Smooth jazz
- Occupations: Musician, composer
- Instruments: Keyboards, piano
- Years active: 1988–present
- Labels: Orpheus; Epic; RCA; Narada; Xela Productions
- Website: alexbugnon.com

Alex Bugnon (born October 10, 1958) is a jazz pianist and composer from Montreux, Switzerland. He is a nephew of Donald Byrd.

Bugnon studied at the Paris Conservatory and the Mozart Academy in Salzburg. At age nineteen, he moved to the U.S. and attended the Berklee School of Music.

His recording career began with his 1988 debut studio album Love Season for Orpheus Records, which reached the Billboard 200 albums chart and the top 40 of the R&B/Hip-Hop Albums chart, as did his follow-up Head Over Heels.

== Discography ==
Title	Album details	Peak chart positions		
Title	Album details	US	US R&B	US Jazz
Love Season	Released: 1988; Label: Orpheus Records	127	34	—
Head Over Heels	Released: 1990; Label: Orpheus Records	131	32	—
107° In the Shade	Released: 1991; Label: Epic Records	—	74	—
This Time Around	Released: June 1, 1993; Label: Epic Records	—	39	—
Tales From the Bright Side	Released: 1995; Label: RCA	—	51	6
...As Promised	Released: February 1, 2000; Label: Narada Jazz	—	—	9
Soul Purpose	Released: November 6, 2001; Label: Narada Jazz	—	—	13
Southern Living	Released: October 7, 2003; Label: Narada Jazz	—	—	27
Free	Released: October 4, 2005; Label: Narada Jazz	—	—	28
Going Home	Released: January 8, 2010; Label: Xela Records	—	—	—
Harlem	Released: November 29, 2013; Label: Xela Records	—	—	—
"—" denotes a recording that did not chart or was not released in that territory.
