= Two Eyes =

Studio album by Brenda Russell
- Released: May 1983
- Recorded: July–December 1982
- Studio: Sound Labs and Sunset Sound (Hollywood, California); Lion Share Studios (Los Angeles, California)
- Genre: R&B; pop; dance
- Length: 34:09
- Label: Warner Bros.
- Producer: Tommy LiPuma

Brenda Russell chronology
Love Life (1981)	Two Eyes (1983)	Get Here (1988)

Professional ratings
Review scores
Source	Rating
AllMusic	3/5 stars
New York Daily News	(favourable)

Two Eyes is the third studio album by the American singer/songwriter Brenda Russell, released in 1983 on Warner Bros. Records. The album got to No. 16 on the Blues & Soul Top British Soul Albums chart.

== Overview ==
Artists such as Michael McDonald, Rita Coolidge, Stevie Wonder, Pattie Brooks, Randy Crawford, Christopher Cross, James Ingram, Patrice Rushen and Al Jarreau appeared on the album.

In 1990, singer Lalah Hathaway covered the song "It's Something" under the title "Somethin'" on her self-titled debut album. Later in 2013 Lalah Hathaway with Snarky Puppy did another rendition of the song for the album 'Family Dinner - Volume 1', which on January 26, 2014, won a Grammy Award in the "Best R&B Performance" category.

== Critical reception ==
Daryl T. Hazelwood of the New York Daily News declared, "the overall album is a winner."

== Track listing ==
No.	Title	Writer(s)	Length
1.	"I Want Love To Find Me"	Brenda Russell, Bill LaBounty	3:02
2.	"It's Something"	Brenda Russell, David Foster	3:31
3.	"Hello People"	Brenda Russell, Michael McDonald	3:24
4.	"Two Eyes"	Brenda Russell	3:16
5.	"Stay Close"	Brenda Russell, Don Grusin	4:25
6.	"Jarreau"	Brenda Russell	3:13
7.	"New York Bars"	Brenda Russell	4:04
8.	"I'll See You Again"	Brenda Russell	4:20
9.	"Look Down, Young Soldier"	Brenda Russell	4:40

== Personnel ==
Musicians

- Brenda Russell – lead vocals, backing vocals (1–4, 6–9), acoustic piano (6, 8, 9)
- Bill LaBounty – acoustic piano (1)
- Leon Pendarvis – Fender Rhodes (1, 4, 6–9)
- James Newton Howard – synthesizers (1, 3–8), LinnDrum (3)
- Robbie Buchanan – additional synthesizers (1, 6, 7)
- David Foster – acoustic piano (2), synthesizers (2)
- Michael McDonald – Fender Rhodes (3), synthesizers (3), LinnDrum (3)
- Don Grusin – Fender Rhodes (5), additional synthesizers (5)
- David Williams – electric guitar (1, 2, 4–7, 9)
- Dean Parks – electric guitar (6)
- Caleb Quaye – electric guitar (8)
- Nathan East – bass
- John Robinson – drums
- Jeff Porcaro – tambourine (3)
- Paulinho da Costa – percussion (4, 6–9)
- Kim Hutchcroft – alto saxophone (1), tenor saxophone (6, 7), flute (9), piccolo flute (9)
- Larry Williams – tenor saxophone (1, 6, 7), flute (9), piccolo flute (9)
- Bill Reichenbach Jr. – trombone (1, 6, 7), bass trombone (9), Baritone horn (9), tuba (9)
- Gary Grant – trumpet (1, 7)
- Jerry Hey – trumpet (1, 6, 7)
- Stevie Wonder – harmonica (8)

Arrangements

- Brenda Russell – vocal arrangements, rhythm arrangements (2–4, 6–9)
- Leon Pendarvis – rhythm arrangements (1, 4, 6–9)
- James Newton Howard – synthesizer arrangements (1, 4–8), rhythm arrangements (3)
- Larry Williams – horn arrangements (1, 6, 7, 9)
- David Foster – rhythm and synthesizer arrangements (2)
- Michael McDonald – rhythm arrangements (3)
- Don Grusin – rhythm arrangements (5)

Backing vocals on "Look Down, Young Soldier"

- Pattie Brooks, Rita Coolidge, Randy Crawford, Christopher Cross, Joe Esposito, Donny Gerrard, James Ingram, Al Jarreau, Bill LaBounty, David Lasley, Michael McDonald, Caleb Quaye, Patrice Rushen, Cinnamon Sharpe and Leon Ware

== Production ==
- David Nathan – executive producer
- Paul Tarnopol – executive producer
- Tommy LiPuma – producer
- Al Schmitt – recording, mixing
- Bob Bullock – assistant engineer
- Terry Christian – assistant engineer
- Don Koldon – assistant engineer
- Peggy McCreary – assistant engineer
- Steve Schmitt – assistant engineer
- Mike Reese – mastering at The Mastering Lab (Hollywood, California)
- Rich Kamerman – creative director
- Simon Levy – art direction
- Laura LiPuma – cover design
- Paddy Reynolds – photography
- Brenda Dash – management, direction

== Charts ==
Year	Chart	Peak position
1983	UK Blues & Soul Top British Soul Albums	16
