= Soul Talkin' =

Studio album by Brenda Russell
- Released: June 1, 1993
- Studios: Pacifique and Track Record (North Hollywood, California); Cherokee (Hollywood, California); Studio 56, Walt Tucker and Willyworld (Los Angeles, California); Take One (Burbank, California)
- Genres: Pop, R&B
- Length: 44:55
- Label: EMI
- Producer: Brenda Russell

Brenda Russell chronology
Greatest Hits (1992)	Soul Talkin' (1993)	Paris Rain (2000)

Soul Talkin' is an album by the American musician Brenda Russell, released in 1993. Disappointed with how the album was handled, Russell took a break from solo recording to travel and work on other projects.

The single "No Time for Time" peaked at No. 47 on Billboard's Adult Contemporary chart.

== Production ==
The album was produced by Russell, who cowrote or wrote every song but one. She spent two years working on Soul Talkin'; it was the first time Russell had produced an album entirely on her own.

== Critical reception ==
Professional ratings
Review scores
Source	Rating
AllMusic	2/5 stars
The Encyclopedia of Popular Music	3/5 stars
The Gazette	B+
Los Angeles Times	1.5/4 stars
MusicHound R&B: The Essential Album Guide	4/5 stars
USA Today	3.5/4 stars

Entertainment Weekly called the album "a crafty collection of Caribbean, Brazilian, and jazzy pop," writing that "not since her 1979 debut has Brenda Russell sounded so good, so right." The Sun Sentinel thought that "it's fine adult contemporary radio fare, but if Russell wants a serious crack at the charts, she needs to loosen up and really swing." The Washington Post determined that Russell "wraps her songs in so many synthesizers and harmony vocals that she smothers them," while noting that her true talent remains her songrwriting.

The Los Angeles Times opined that "the highlight is the appearance of Bobby Caldwell—another gutsy singer—on the gently romantic 'Who Are You?'" USA Today declared that Russell is "a gifted composer," writing that "her infectious pop melodies enrich the album." The Orange County Register deemed the album "compelling, if slick, R&B pop/balladry."

== Track listing ==
No.	Title	Writer(s)	Length
1.	"Matters of the Heart"	Brenda Russell, Larry Williams	4:15
2.	"Soul Talkin'"	Russell	4:54
3.	"In Over My Heart"	Russell, Denise Eisenberg Rich, Mary Unobsky	4:47
4.	"No Time for Time"	Russell	4:22
5.	"You'll Fall in Love Again"	Russell	4:30
6.	"10,000 Words"	Russell, Joe Turano	4:33
7.	"Life Is Waiting"	Russell	4:41
8.	"Got to Love"	Russell	4:48
9.	"The Universe Is Calling You"	Russell, Ivan Lins	5:32
10.	"Who Are You?" (featuring Bobby Caldwell)	Bill Cantos	4:43
Total length:			44:55

== Personnel ==
Musicians

- Brenda Russell – vocals, synth strings (5), guitar synthesizer (5), synthesizers (7)
- Jeff Hull – keyboard synthesizer programming (1, 4), drum programming (1, 4), keyboard programming (9), intro sound effects (9)
- Russell Ferrante – acoustic piano (2, 10), acoustic piano solo (3)
- Greg Phillinganes – keyboards (2)
- William "Smitty" Smith – Rhodes electric piano (2, 3), keyboards (6), organ (6)
- Brad Cole – synthesizers (2, 7), additional synthesizers (3), synth flute (5), synth percussion (5), keyboard programming (7), drum programming (7, 8), keyboard synthesizer programming (8)
- David Swanson – synthesizers (2, 6)
- Aaron Zigman – synthesizers (3)
- Michael Ruff – acoustic piano (5)
- Larry Williams – additional synthesizers (5), synth solo ending (5)
- Joe Turano – acoustic piano (6), additional synthesizers (6)
- Ivan Lins – synthesizers (9), percussion (9)
- James Harrah – acoustic guitar (1), guitars (3, 8)
- Ricardo Silveira – acoustic guitar (2, 4, 5), guitars (9)
- Marlo Henderson – guitars (3)
- Don Griffin – guitars (6)
- Michael Thompson – guitars (7)
- Bill Sharpe – electric bass (2), bass (3)
- Abraham Laboriel – bass (6)
- John Leftwich – acoustic bass (10)
- Alvino Bennett – drums (2, 6)
- Craig Siegel – drum programming (2), additional programming (3)
- Carlos Vega – drums (3, 10)
- Lenny Castro – percussion (2, 3)
- Luis Conte – percussion (6)
- Cassio Duarte – percussion (9)
- Mike Shapiro – percussion (10)
- Everette Harp – sax solos (2)
- Scott Mayo – saxophones (2)
- Reggie Young – trombone (2)
- Michael "Patches" Stewart – trumpet (2)
- Tollak Ollestad – harmonica (4)
- Gary Herbig – woodwinds (5)
- Dan Higgins – woodwinds (5)
- Kim Hutchcroft – woodwinds (5)
- Bob Tricarico – woodwinds (5)

Background and guest vocals

- Maxayn Lewis – backing vocals (1–3, 6, 8)
- Arnold McCuller – backing vocals (1, 8)
- Joe Turano – backing vocals (1, 6, 8)
- Mica Paris – vocal inspiration (1)
- Brenda Russell – backing vocals (2, 3, 6)
- Petsye Powell – backing vocals (2, 3, 6)
- Paulette Brown – backing vocals (3, 6)
- Amanda Hayley – backing vocals (3)
- Carol Perry – backing vocals (4, 7, 9)
- Darlene Perry – backing vocals (4, 7, 9)
- Lori Perry – backing vocals (4, 7, 9)
- Sharon Perry – backing vocals (4, 7, 9)
- Rita Coolidge – backing vocals (6)
- Louis Price – backing vocals (6)
- Bill Sharpe – backing vocals (6)
- William "Smitty" Smith – backing vocals (6)
- David Swanson – backing vocals (6)
- Mary Wilson – backing vocals (6)
- Dianne Brooks – backing vocals (8)
- Pauline Wilson – backing vocals (8)
- Ivan Lins – vocal solo (9)
- Bobby Caldwell – vocals (10)

Arrangements

- Brenda Russell – all vocal arrangements, arrangements (1–3, 5, 7–9)
- Jeff Hull – arrangements (1, 4)
- Jerry Hey – woodwind arrangements (5)
- Brad Cole – arrangements (7, 8)
- Steve Lindsey – arrangements (8)
- Ivan Lins – arrangements (9)
- Bill Cantos – arrangements (10)
- Mike Shapiro – arrangements (10)

Production

- Ron Fair – executive producer
- Brenda Russell – producer
- Tommy Vicari – recording, mixing
- Fletcher Dobrocke – recording (2, 3, 5, 6)
- David Ahlert – additional recording (1, 3, 10)
- Jeffrey "Woody" Woodruff – additional recording (2, 6), recording (7–9)
- Tony Phillips – additional recording (2, 5, 6)
- Erik Hanson – additional recording (3)
- Micajah Ryan – additional recording (3)
- Randy Long – assistant engineer (1–5, 7–10)
- Judy Kirschner – assistant engineer (2, 3)
- Scott Ralston – assistant engineer (2)
- Jeff Shannon – assistant engineer (2, 5)
- Darian Sahanaja – assistant engineer (3)
- Bernie Grundman – mastering at Bernie Grundman Mastering (Hollywood, California)
- Debbie Wolinsky – production assistant
- Henry Marquez – art direction
- Lu Ann Graffeo – design
- Daniela Federici – photography
- Tanya Gill – stylist
- Roberto Leon – hair stylist
- Rudy Calvo – make-up
