= Brenda Russell =

American-Canadian singer-songwriter (born 1949)

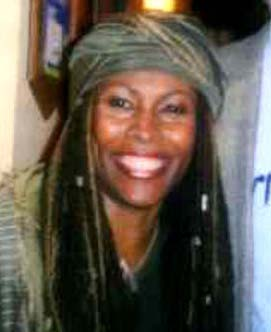
- Russell in 2007

Background information
- Born: Brenda Gordon; April 8, 1949 (age 77); New York City, New York, U.S.
- Genres: R&B; pop; soul; jazz
- Instruments: Vocals; keyboards
- Years active: 1963–present
- Labels: Horizon (1979); A&M (1979–1981, 1988–1992); Warner Bros. (1983); EMI (1993); Hidden Beach (2000); Dome/Narada Jazz (2003–2004)
- Website: www.brendarussell.com

Brenda Russell (née Gordon; born April 8, 1949) is an American-Canadian singer-songwriter, producer, and keyboardist. Russell has a diverse musical range which encompasses R&B, pop, soul, dance, and jazz. She has received five Grammy nominations, winning in 2017 for writing the music for The Color Purple.

== Life and background ==
Russell was born in Brooklyn, New York in April 1949. Both of Russell's parents were musicians. Her mother was a singer/songwriter and her father, Gus Gordon, was a one-time member of the Ink Spots.

Russell's family moved to Hamilton, Ontario, Canada when she was 12-years-old. As a teenager she began performing in local bands and was recruited to sing in a Toronto-based girl group called the Tiaras alongside Jackie Richardson, Arlene Trotman, and Colina Phillips. The group's only single, "Where Does All The Time Go", was released on Barry Records in 1968 but was unsuccessful.

== Career ==
=== 1960s to 1970s ===
When Russell was 14 years old she met the group the Soul Searchers. She would later open for them during live performances. In her late teens, she joined the Toronto production of Hair, during which time she had begun to play the piano. In the early 1970s, she married Scottish-Canadian musician Brian Russell when they were both in the band Dr. Music. The couple went on to produce Rufus's "Please Pardon Me" (on their album Rufusized) and they contributed backing vocals to Neil Sedaka's "Laughter in the Rain". The Russells performed as backing vocalists for Elton John's concert at Wembley Stadium on June 21, 1975. Credited as Brian & Brenda, they released two albums on John's Rocket label: Word Called Love in 1976 and Supersonic Lover in 1977.

The duo also performed on two tracks from Robert Palmer's breakout soul-pop album Double Fun. Their daughter, Lindsay, was born in 1977. The couple divorced, and Brenda set out on a solo career from her base in Los Angeles.

In 1979, Russell's self-titled debut album was released by A&M Records. The album rose to number 20 on the Billboard Top R&B/Hip-Hop Albums chart. A track from the LP called "So Good So Right" also hit number 8 on the Billboard Adult Contemporary Songs chart, number 15 on the Billboard Hot Soul Songs and number 30 on the Billboard Hot 100 chart.

=== 1980s to 1990s ===
Russell co-wrote two tracks for Earth, Wind & Fire's 1980 album Faces (including the hit single "You"), and also co-wrote the hit single "I've Had Enough" from their 1981 album Raise! She released her second solo album Love Life in 1981 on A&M. She also co-wrote the track "Breakout" for Patrice Rushen's 1982 album Straight From The Heart, and performed backing vocals on the song. Also in 1982, Russell was one of the "All Star Choir" on Donna Summer's hit single "State of Independence", which also included Michael Jackson, Lionel Richie, Dionne Warwick, Kenny Loggins, Michael McDonald and Stevie Wonder among others.

In 1983, she released her third album, Two Eyes, on Warner Bros. Records. Russell relocated to Sweden for a brief time and began writing songs for her next album.

Returning to A&M Records, Russell's fourth album, Get Here, was released in 1988. It became her greatest commercial success, spawning her biggest hit "Piano in the Dark", a US Top 10 and UK Top 30 hit which featured Joe Esposito. The song garnered three Grammy Award nominations. The album became Russell's first charting album in the UK where it peaked at number 77. The title track "Get Here", which was penned by Russell, was later covered by American singer Oleta Adams for her 1990 album Circle of One, and became a transatlantic hit for Adams in 1991.

Russell issued her fifth album, Kiss Me with the Wind, in 1990. The album included Russell's own version of the song "Dinner with Gershwin", which she wrote some years earlier and had been a hit for Donna Summer in 1987 (Russell also co-produced and appeared on Summer's version).

Russell wrote and produced the track "Forever" for Phil Perry's 1991 album The Heart of the Man. Russell also featured on the 1991 charity single "Voices That Care", which reached number 11 on the Billboard Hot 100 and number 6 on the Billboard Adult Contemporary Songs chart. She also appeared on Joni Mitchell's 1991 album Night Ride Home as well as on the Yellowjackets' 1992 album Live Wires.

In 1992, A&M Records released Russell's first Greatest Hits album. After this, Russell released her sixth studio album Soul Talkin' in 1993 on EMI Records. Russell co-wrote and produced the track "Let Somebody Know" for Diana Ross on the US version of her 1995 album Take Me Higher (Russell would record her own version of the song for her 2004 album Between The Sun and The Moon). She also recorded two songs for the 1999 film Liberty Heights, in which she also appeared.

=== 2000s ===
Russell returned to her solo career in 2000 with the album Paris Rain, released on Hidden Beach Records, with contributions from Carole King, Dave Koz and Sheila E. The album saw Russell move away from the pop market toward a more adult-oriented sound. In 2003, she signed to the new UK label Dome Records and released the compilation album So Good, So Right: The Best of Brenda Russell. Her eighth studio album, Between the Sun and the Moon, was released by Dome in 2004.

In 2005, a musical version of Alice Walker's The Color Purple opened on Broadway. Produced by Oprah Winfrey, the show's score was written by Russell and lyricists-composers Allee Willis and Stephen Bray. Russell and her co-writers were nominated for a Tony Award (for Best Score) and a Grammy Award (in the Best Musical Show Album category).

In 2015, Russell, after making her home in Los Angeles for 30 years, took up residence in Texas.

In 2016, Russell received a Grammy for The Color Purple in the category of Best Musical Theater Album.

== Legacy ==
The hook from Russell's song "Piano in the Dark" was heard in the dance club hit "I Cry" by Flo Rida, who actually sampled the song "Cry (Just a Little)" by the Bingo Players, which interpolates "Piano in the Dark".

Russell's song "A Little Bit of Love" has been sampled more than a dozen times. Notable uses are "Still Not a Player" by Big Pun (1998), "I Want You" by Thalía (2003), "The Way" by Ariana Grande (2013), and "What I Wanna" by MoStack (2018).

When asked in an interview which songs they wished they had written, the British band Hot Chip listed Russell's track "Way Back When" from her 1979 album debut solo album.

== Discography ==
- Brenda Russell (1979)
- Love Life (1981)
- Two Eyes (1983)
- Get Here (1988)
- Kiss Me with the Wind (1990)
- Soul Talkin' (1993)
- Paris Rain (2000)
- Between the Sun and the Moon (2004)

== Filmography ==
Russell featured as a singer in the feature films American Hot Wax, The Santa Clause, and Liberty Heights.

== Accolades ==
=== Grammy Awards ===
The Grammy Awards are awarded annually by the National Academy of Recording Arts and Sciences. Russell has received a total of five Grammy nominations altogether.

Year	Category	Nominated work	Result
1989	Song of the Year	"Piano in the Dark"	Nominated
1989	Best Pop Vocal Performance, Female	Get Here	Nominated
1989	Best Pop Performance By A Duo Or Group With Vocals	"Piano in the Dark"	Nominated
2006	Best Musical Show Album	The Color Purple	Nominated
2016	Best Musical Theatre Album	The Color Purple	Won

=== Tony Awards ===
Russell has also been nominated for a Tony Award.

Year	Category	Nominated work	Result
2006	Original Musical Score	The Color Purple	Nominated
