= Phil Perry =

American R&B musician (born 1952)

- Born: Philip Eugene Perry; January 12, 1952 (age 74); Springfield, Illinois, U.S.
- Genres: R&B, soul, jazz
- Occupations: Singer, songwriter, musician, producer, arranger
- Instrument: Vocals
- Years active: 1971–present
- Labels: Capitol, GRP, Private Music, Peak, Shanachie
- Formerly of: The Montclairs
- Website: philperrymusic.com

Philip Eugene Perry (born January 12, 1952) is an American R&B singer, songwriter, musician and a former member of the soul group, The Montclairs, from 1971 to 1975. He was also known for performing the opening song to the Disney animated series, Goof Troop.

== Biography ==
Discovered by Catholic nuns while singing high Masses in his Catholic church (St. Elizabeth's in East St. Louis, Illinois), Perry was a high-school talent show favorite. He wrote and recorded his first single "Hey You" with The Montclairs, who were also based in East St. Louis. They were signed to the Archway Records label just before Perry turned 17 in 1969. The song is considered to be the first of a classic soul collection of Perry singles popular in the 1970s.

In 1972, The Montclairs recorded songs written by Perry for Paula Records, including "Dreaming's out of Season," "Prelude to a Heartbreak," and "Begging's Hard to Do." The Montclairs left Paula Records and a second album was produced and recorded featuring Perry and his songs, but it was shelved in 1974 and rediscovered in 2001. As a result of the canceled album, the group disbanded in 1975.

Perry then moved to California with former Montclairs member Kevin Sanlin, recording as a duo, which resulted in two albums at Capitol Records in the early 1980s produced by Chuck Jackson and Dr. Cecil Hale. One song, "Just to Make You Happy," had some success in radio. In 1989, Perry was the featured vocalist on “Love Brought Us Here”, a track on Rique Pantoja’s album of the same name, released by Pony Canyon and featuring Lee Ritenour, Ernie Watts and other notable musicians.

In the 1990s, Perry scored his first number-one R&B hit, "Call Me", a remake of the 1970 Aretha Franklin hit, as well as the top-40 R&B singles "Amazing Love" and "Forever" (written by Brenda Russell), all from his first solo album The Heart of the Man (1991), released by Capitol Records. Perry is also featured on many GRP Records projects, including with such smooth-jazz guitarists Lee Ritenour and Russ Freeman, and pianist Don Grusin. Perry is also a featured vocalist on recordings by Michel Colombier, Don Grusin, Dave Grusin, Freddie Hubbard, George Duke, Najee, Bill Withers, Barbra Streisand, June Pointer, Johnny Mathis, The Benoit-Freeman Project (David Benoit & Russ Freeman), Sergio Mendes, Bobby Womack, Chaka Khan, Fourplay, George Benson and Will Downing, among others.

Perry's other solo hits also include "Love Don't Love Nobody" and "One Heart, One Love." He is also featured on the Bebe's Kids soundtrack, singing a track with Renee Diggs. Other film song credits include Roots, Pretty in Pink, Short Circuit, Mr. Wonderful, Nice Girls Don't Explode, Riding Bean, Captain Ron. He had a cameo acting appearance in the 2009 Harrison Ford film Crossing Over.

On September 11, 2001, Perry was scheduled to perform at the World Trade Center's lunch-hour jazz concert series between 11 a.m. and 1 p.m. He was ultimate spared from the devastation of the terrorist attacks on the Twin Towers. However, for the next few years, he sank into an artistic depression, and did not record again until invited by longtime friend Don Grusin, whom he joined in September 2003 for a collaborative venture titled The Hang. This CD/DVD project was nominated for a Grammy Award and included Harvey Mason, Patti Austin, Natali Renee, Abraham Laboriel, Alex Acuna, Ernie Watts, Lee Ritenour, and others.

In 2006, producer Chris "Big Dog" Davis, urged Perry to record a collection of R&B hits titled Classic Love Songs as an independent one-off project for Shanachie Records. Since that time, Perry has recorded four projects for that label with Davis, including a project with Melba Moore. In 2007 he reunited with Dave Koz and toured the country. The same year, he released the album Mighty Love, for which he was voted the 2007 Male Vocalist of the Year in the SoulTracks Readers' Choice Awards. In 2008, Perry recorded a duet album with Moore titled The Gift of Love. It was awarded the Duo Album of the Year Award in the SoulTracks Readers Choice Awards.

After returning from a South African trip, Perry became ill during a performance with Pieces of a Dream, in October 2009, at Southern Connecticut State University. Unsubstantiated rumors began to circulate that he had died. While there was no definitive medical diagnosis for the collapse, he was treated at a local New Haven hospital and released with the strong recommendation that he take some time off and rest. In 2010, "Ready for Love" was released by Shanachie. Inspired to continue writing after his health scare, this effort featured more Perry originals than in any of his earlier releases, which was said to be of great satisfaction to him.

March 2013 saw the release of Say Yes, his 10th solo album, and the fifth on Shanachie. It charted in the top ten on the Billboard and A.C. Smooth jazz charts, and received Smooth Jazz top vocal credits. Two years after its release, Say Yes continued produced one of Billboard's 2014 top smooth jazz singles, featuring Perry in a duet cover of Where Is the Love? with Chanté Moore.

The 11th solo release from Perry on the Shanachie label—A Better Man in 2015—reached #1 on the Billboard Contemporary Jazz chart in the first week of its release.

== Discography ==
- 1991 The Heart of the Man (Capitol)
- 1994 Pure Pleasure (GRP/MCA)
- 1998 One Heart One Love (Private Music)
- 2000 My Book of Love (Private Music)
- 2001 Magic (Peak)
- 2006 Classic Love Songs (Shanachie)
- 2007 A Mighty Love (Shanachie)
- 2008 Ready for Love (Shanachie)
- 2009 The Gift of Love (Shanachie)
- 2013 Say Yes (Shanachie)
- 2015 A Better Man (Shanachie)
- 2017 Breathless (Shanachie)

The Montclairs featuring Phil Perry

- 1972 Dreaming Out of Season (Paula)

With David Garfield

- Together in the Arms of Love
- Deep Within Each Man presented by Shorinji Kenpo (Japan)
- Road Buster (1989 Riding Bean anime)
- King of the Road (1989 Riding Bean anime)
- Running the Road (1989 Riding Bean anime)

With Kevin Sanlin

- 1980 For Those Who Love (Capitol)
- 1981 We're the Winners (Capitol)
